= Manrique Alonso Lallave =

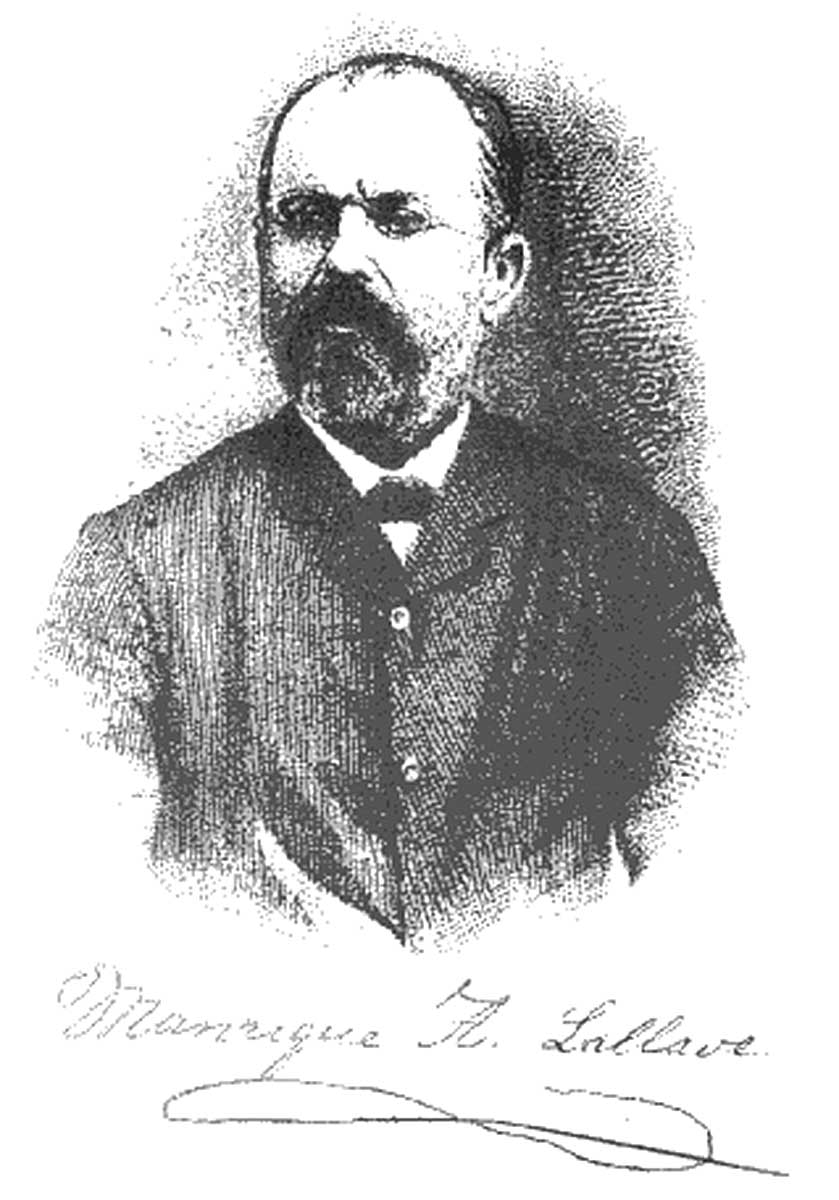
- Photo of Manrique Alonso Lallave in Madrid, 1886 for the Spanish Christian Church, now named the Spanish Anglican Church
- Born: 14 February 1839; La Fuente de San Esteban, Salamanca, Spain
- Died: 5 June 1889 (aged 50)
- Other names: Fr. Nicolás Manrique Alonso Lallave
- Citizenship: Spanish citizenship
- Known for: Translating the Gospel of Luke into the Pangasinan language
- Spouse: Carolina Ortíz Morilla (before 1889)
- Children: 7

Manrique Alonso Lallave also known as Fr. Nicolás Manrique Alonso Lallave was a Spanish Dominican priest well known for translating the Gospel of Luke into the Pangasinan language, the first ever known instance of a part of the Bible translated into a Philippine language.

== Biography ==
=== Early life ===
Not much is known about Lallave's early life. He was born on 14 February 1839 in the small village of La Fuente de San Esteban To Don Vicente Alonso, of Aldeadávila de la Ribera (Salamanca, Spain) and Doña Francisca de la Llave, of Cordoba (Spain). He was baptised on 20 February 1839 in said town by Andrés Peromato. at age 14, he entered a convent of the Dominican overseas missionaries. He finished his studies in Manila and served as a Roman Catholic pastor for 12 years in the Philippine Islands.

=== Conversion to Protestantism ===
He seems to have converted to Protestantism while in Pangasinan as the Spanish Dominican priest he received an English Bible from a British captain, and/or by Protestant treaties that someone had sent him from London, which caused a change causing his preachings to become Protestant. In 1867, someone sent him Protestant treaties from Spain, which caused him to be demoted and locked in a dungeon in a convent in Manila, He wrote about his conversion: “My somewhat extensive knowledge of religion has come to persuade me of the many and far-reaching mistakes of the Church of Rome, from which I have separated, freely and spontaneously, with no other purpose than to profess the truth, and using the anti-evangelical behavior of the Roman clergy in general and of the friars in particular” (Note: The original text from "ALONSO LALLAVE, MANRIQUE" (in Spanish). was: “Mis conocimientos algo extensos en materia de religión me han llegado a persuadir de los muchos y trascendentales errores de la Iglesia de Roma, de la que me he separado, libre y espontáneamente, sin más objeto que profesar la verdad, y sirviéndome de móvil la conducta antievangélica del clero romano en general y de los frailes en particular”) as a motive.

=== Later life ===
A cropped photo of Lallave, taken in Madrid, 1886 by his Church

Because of his Protestantism, In 1872, he was removed from his position as priest and sent back to Spain where he renounced Catholicism and joined a Protestant church called the Spanish Christian Church and began his ministry in the evangelical churches of Granada and Madrid in different periods, being a pastor established in Seville from 1874 to 1888.

in 1873, he translated the Gospel of Luke into the Pangasinan language, which was the first instance of a part of the Bible translated into a Philippine language, it was then published in 1877 by the British and Foreign Bible Society

In Seville he became a Mason, in the Numancia 16 lodge of the Gran Oriente Luso in 1886 of the Great East Luso by 1886, being Master Founder. Later he would find Numancia 67 of the Gran Logia Sevillana and will be director of El taller, a freemason newspaper

In 1877, he became a Protestant pastor. He nearly finished translating the New Testament, married Carolina Ortíz Morilla, together they had seven children.

In 1880, he released a Biblical dictionary called "Diccionario bíblico : primera parte que comprende la historia, geografía y etnografía de las Santas Escrituras, ilustrado con grabados intercalados en el texto y mapas geográficos / por el rev. don Manrique Alonso Lallave"

In 1882, he translated Samuel B. Schieffelin's "The Foundations of History: a Series of First Things" into Spanish.

=== Death ===
Just before he went to Manila, Lallave passed by Madrid to see his translation printed, on 30 March 1889. He went to Manila with F. de P. Castells, (Note: His full name is Francisco de Paula Castells or felipe de paula castells) a young Catalan Protestant pastor, planning to distribute his translated Bibles, to check if his aforementioned translation in Pangasinan had arrived, create a Protestant church in the Philippines and establish an agency of the British and Foreign Bible Society. Shortly afterwards they both got sick, Lallave died and got buried, while Castells recovered and then was released from jail through the British consul's intercession, on condition that he leave the Islands immediately, according to some sources and Castells, Lallave and Castells were poisoned, this was then backed up when Lallave's daughter then claimed that 2 months after her father's death, his family received a cable and doctor's note saying that Lallave died from a fever and that his last word's were about his family, 2 messages from Manila to the family claimed that he was poisoned.

He was buried in the now defunct British Protestant Cemetery in what is now Ayala's Makati.

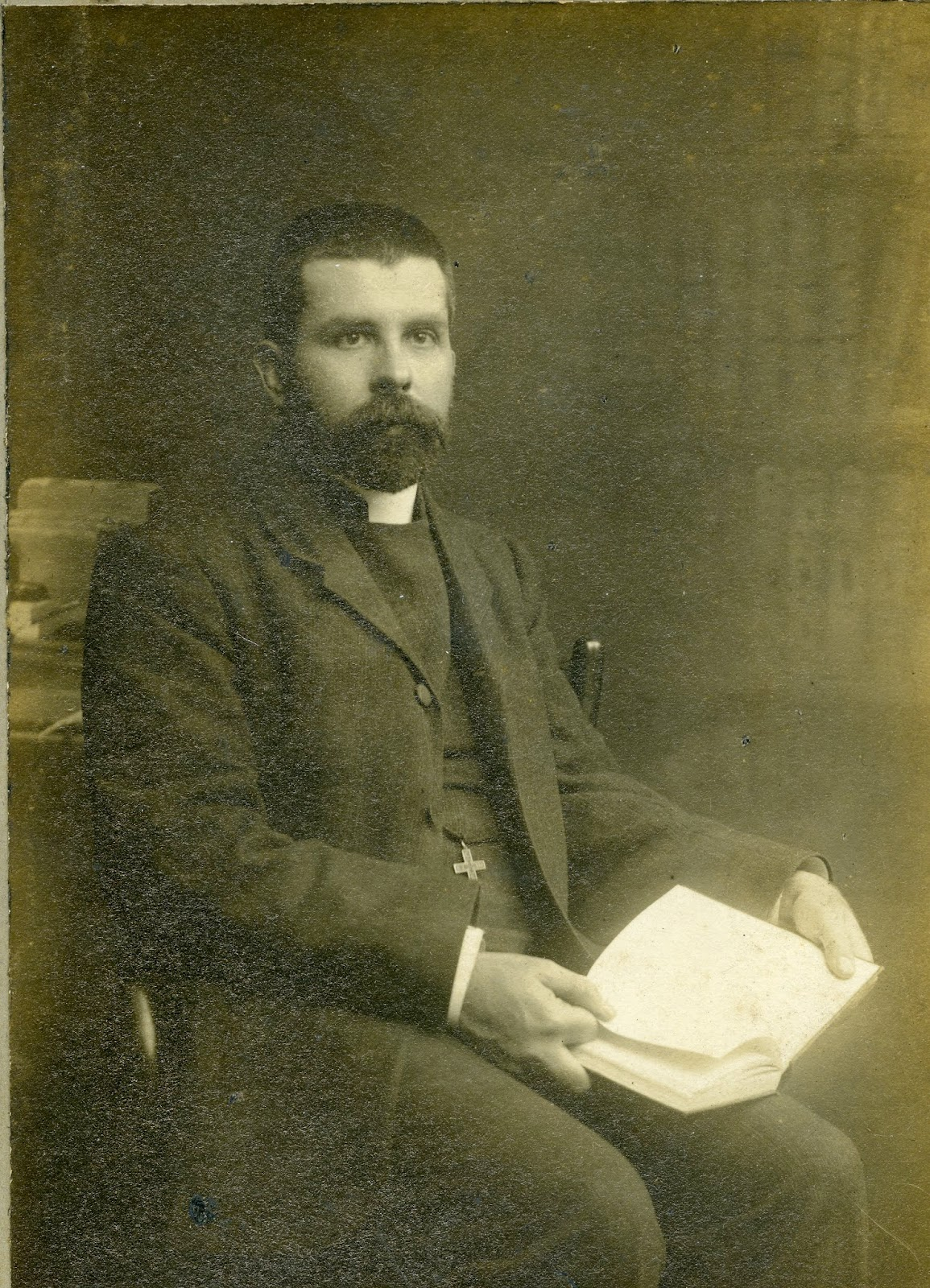
F. de P. Castells c. 1910 (Courtesy of Bexley Borough Archives)

== Personal life ==
He married Carolina Ortiz Morilla in 1887, together they had 7 children, one of which was Miss Esther Alonso.
