= Anglicanism in Spain =

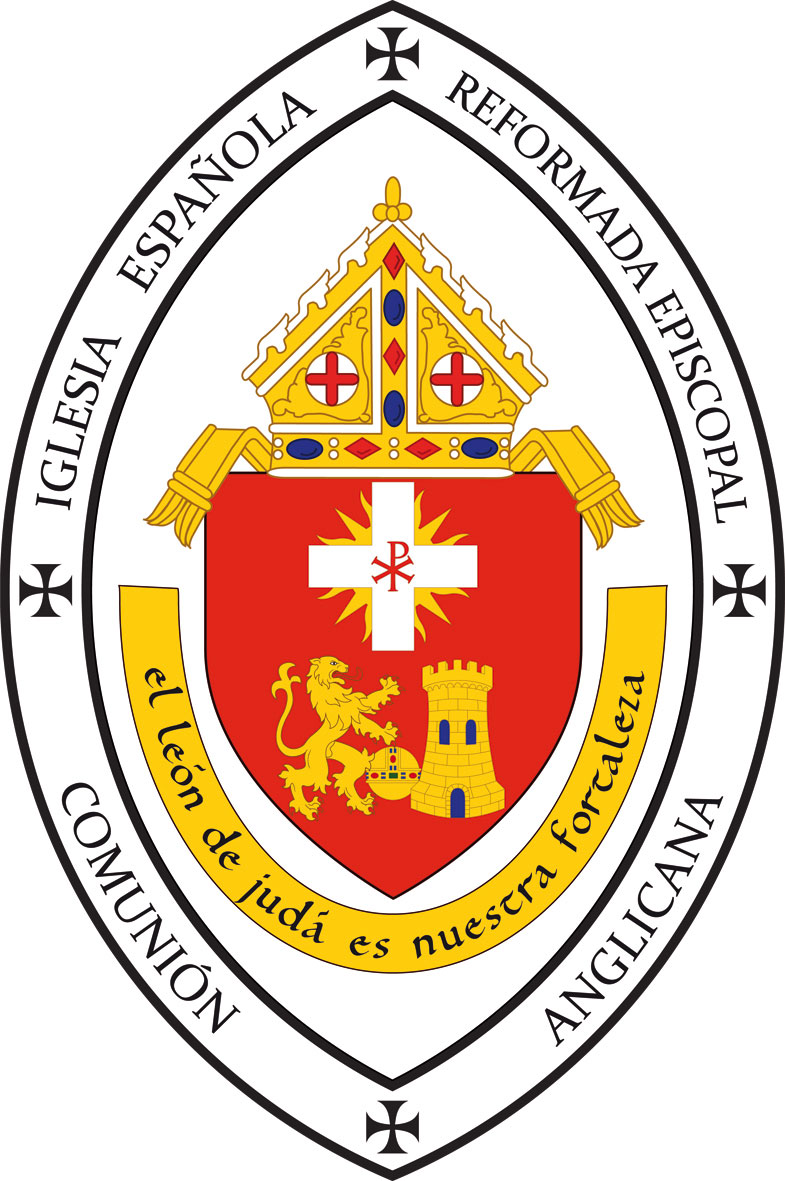
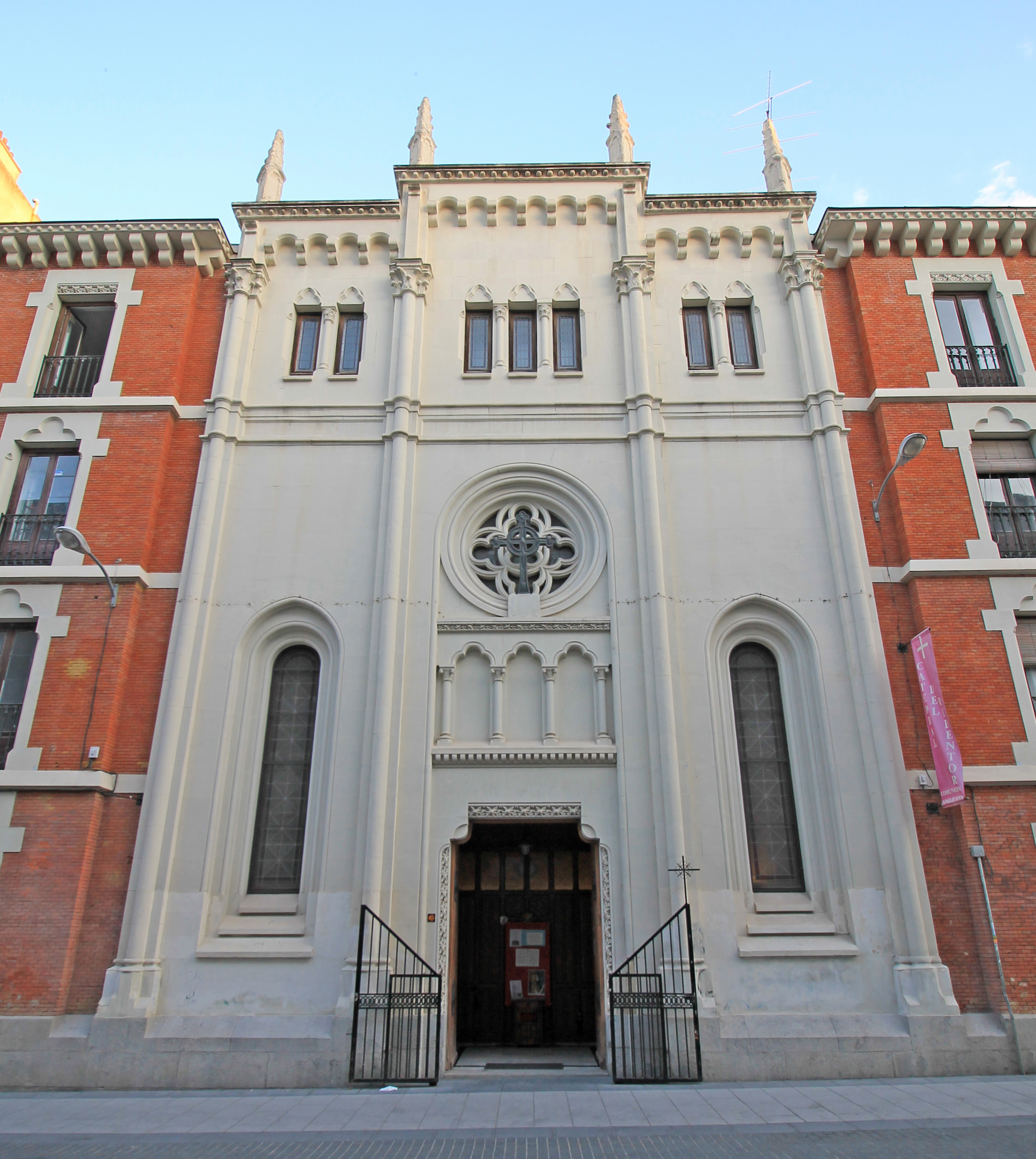
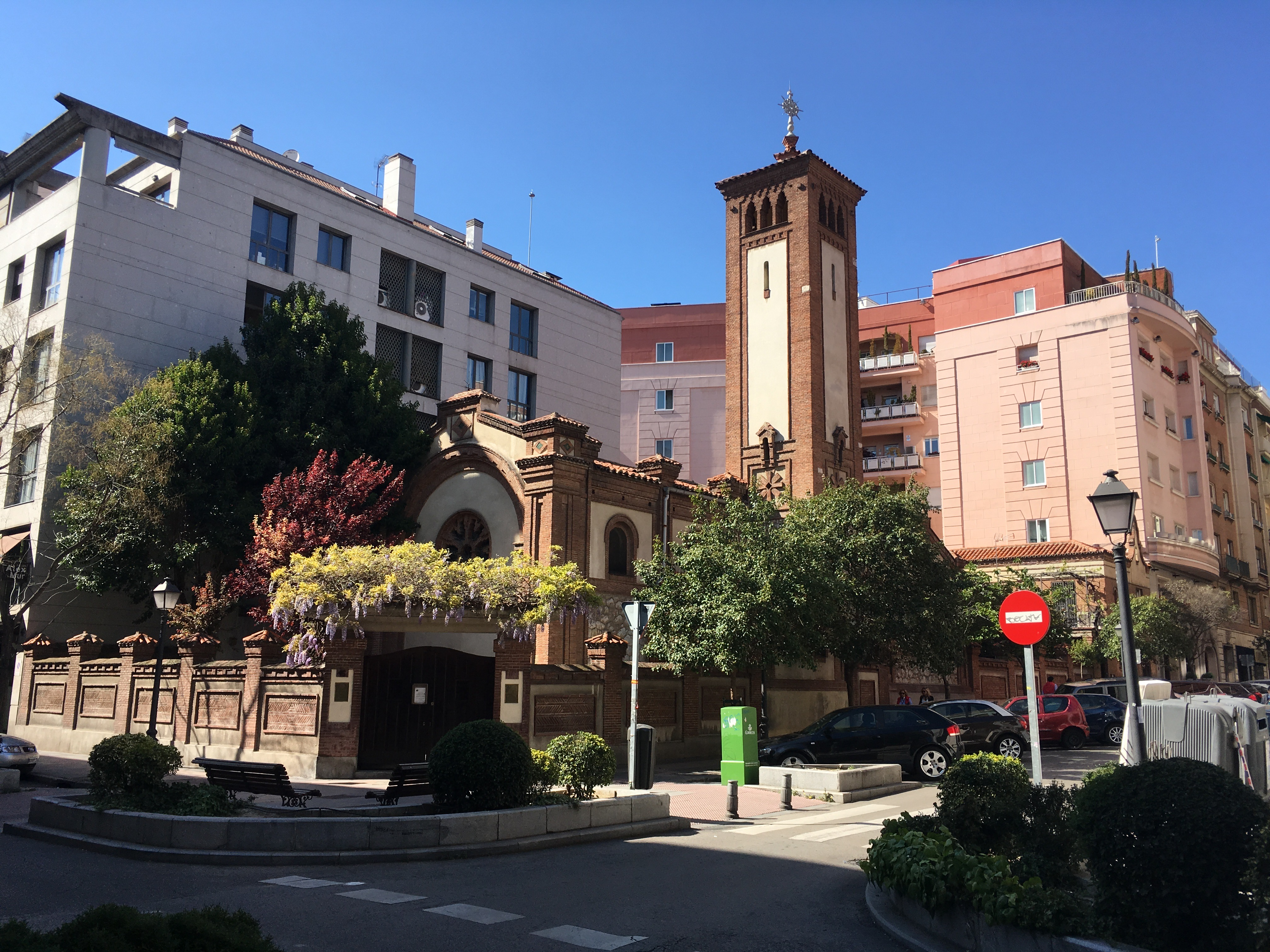
Clockwise from upper left: Seal of the Spanish Reformed Episcopal Church (SREC); Anglican Cathedral of the Redeemer at Madrid (SREC); St George's Anglican Church, Madrid (Church of England).

Anglicanism in Spain has its roots in the 16th-century Spanish Reformation. Today it is represented by two Church bodies, namely, the Spanish Reformed Episcopal Church and Church of England's Diocese in Europe.

== Background ==
The Spanish Reformation started in the 16th century, when several Spaniards fully agreed with the approaches of the Protestant Reformation initiated by Martin Luther in Germany. Outstanding groups among these adherents were those of Valladolid (related to Lutheranism) and Seville (initially favourable to Calvinism). The Sevillian group included the Hieronymite monks from the Monastery of San Isidoro del Campo.

In the beginning, Spanish Protestantism spread mainly amongst the noble and educated class, due to its close ties with Christian humanism and the reading of the Bible. As testimony to this period, there were distinguished names such as Juan de Valdés, Francisco de Enzinas, Casiodoro de Reina, Cipriano de Valera and Antonio del Corro. Casiodoro and Cipriano made the first complete modern translation of the Bible into Spanish later known as the Reina-Valera version.

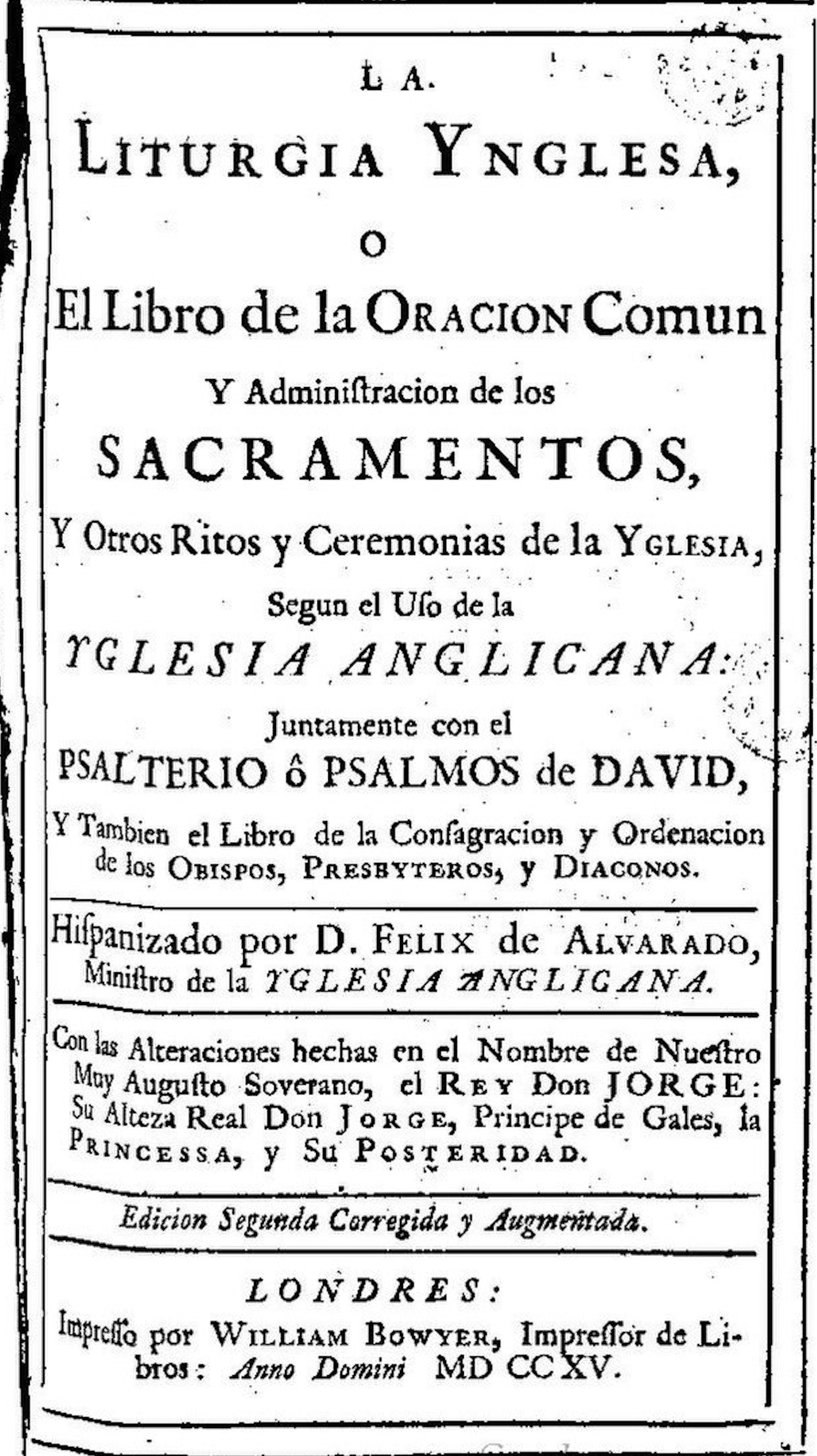
Antonio de Alvarado's translation of the Book of Common Prayer, first published in 1707, second edition in 1715.

A convert to Anglicanism during this period was Tomás Carrascón de las Cortes y Medrano, who served as canon of Hereford Cathedral. In addition to authoring a number of works in Latin and Spanish dedicated to Propaganda during the Reformation, he made a Spanish translation of the Book of Common Prayer in 1623, entitled Liturgia inglesa, o Libro del Rezado publico. In 1707, another convert to Anglicanism, Antonio de Alvarado, made a new translation of the Prayer Book printed in London, under the title of La Liturgia Ynglesa, o El Libro de la Oracion Comun. This translation was made for a congregation of Spanish merchants in London, to which Alvarado was the minister. Another translation would be made later and would be used by the Spanish congregations in Gibraltar led by Lorenzo Lucena Pedrosa during the 19th century.

Protestants were remarkably favoured during the Sexenio Democrático (1868–1874) after the Spanish Revolution of 1868. The Provisional Government granted by decree the freedom of worship in 1868. Tolerance towards foreign Protestants turned out to be decisive for the recognition for the first time in a constitutional text of religious freedom in Spain, since it was precisely by this decree that religious dissidence was allowed for the Spaniards.

== History ==
=== Seville ===
Around the time of the Spanish Revolution of 1868, there resided in Seville an English clergyman, the Rev. Lewen Street Tugwell, who may be described as the father of the Episcopal development of Reform in Spain. He watched closely the result of the revolution, and witnessed the expression of the Spaniards of their desire for more in the spiritual realm than Rome had to offer. An appeal was made to the English public, through the Church papers, and the result was that sufficient money was received to purchase the Church of San Basilio from the Spanish Government. This church originally belonged to the Friars of the Order of St. Basil; but that Order had been suppressed, the building had been offered for sale.

On 11 June 1871, 1,200 persons gathered at the newly-opened Church of San Basilio for the first public service led by the Rev. Francisco Palomares García, one of the founders of the Spanish Reformed Episcopal Church (SREC). The service was liturgical and on the lines of Church of England. The opening sentences from morning prayer, the general confession and absolution, the Venite, the Litany, the thanksgiving, and a few of the collects had been translated into Spanish. This public service was a remarkable scene in Spain's ecclesiastical history, since it was difficult before the declaration of religious liberty in 1868 for foreigners even to hold a service at any seaport for their own countrymen; and for Spaniards to assemble for any religious purpose other than Catholic was an impossibility.

Francisco Palomares was a Catholic chaplain from Requena, Valencia. As in common with most Spaniards, he was brought up to believe that Protestantism and infidelity were synonymous terms. In 1869, he travelled to England and was struck by the English Sunday Service. This led him to study the subject and eventually became acquainted with the Rev. John Astbury Aston, then labouring in Kensington. The latter encouraged Palomares to go back to Spain and "preach the faith which once he destroyed". Palomares returned to Spain and had worked at San Basilio since then.

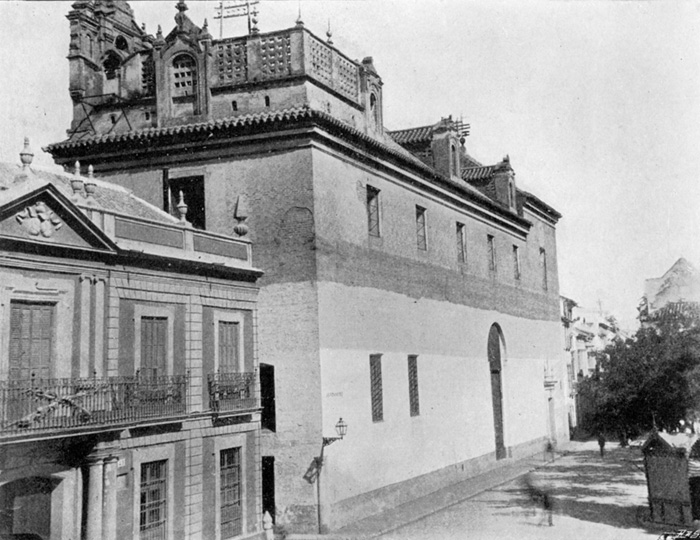
Church of the Ascension at Seville, 19th century

In 1872, the Church of the Ascension was purchased by C. H. Bousefield from the Spanish Government, for the accommodation of the small English community in Seville, and also for the services of the Spanish Reformed Church. After a series of difficulties raised by the authorities, the church was eventually opened on 5 November with a service, which included prayers read by the Rev. Palomares, and a sermon preached by Señor Aguilera. The church was filled with many students and soldiers. Besides the above-mentioned two churches, another former Catholic church known as the Sailors' Chapel was purchased in Triana, an important suburb of Seville. In the Cantonalist insurrections of 1873, the Church of San Basilio was used as a place of refuge during the bombardment of the city. In 1876 an institute for young men was founded in Seville, with a Bible class and prayer meeting. Some of these young Spaniards had been appointed from time to time to take cottage services, and to speak at meetings.

Following the restoration of the Bourbon monarchy in 1874, the Reformed Church's official magazine La Luz was suppressed. There was, however, no interference with the services, and the work continued to make progress. The reports from Seville stated that 70 individuals were presented in a communicants' class at San Basilio, and 300 children were under instruction in the schools.

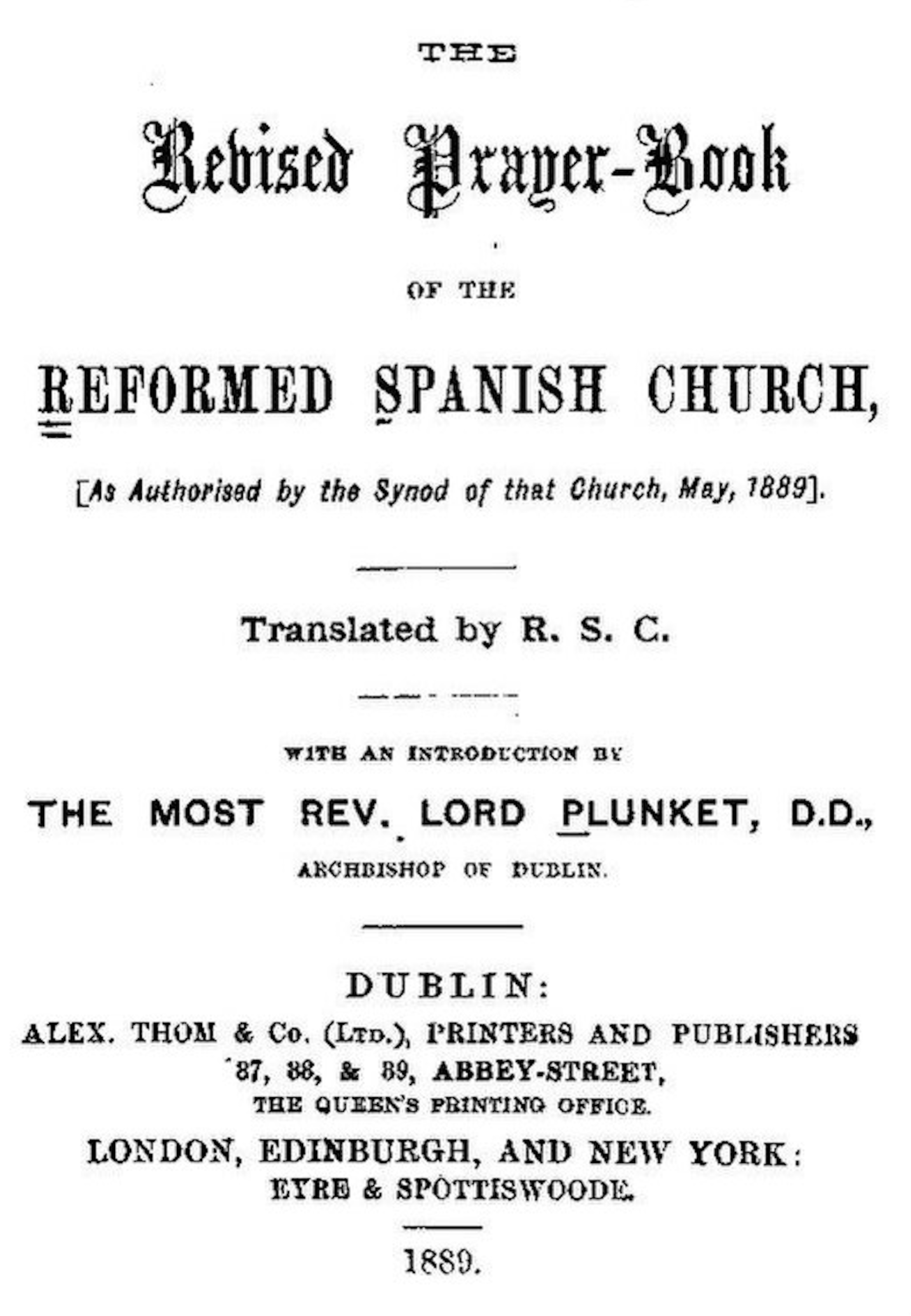
English translation of the 1889 revised Prayer Book used in the Spanish Reformed Episcopal Church, published in Dublin.

In March 1880, the first Synod of the Spanish Reformed Episcopal Church was held in Seville, and was attended by delegates from the congregations in other cities. Bishop Henry Chauncey Riley of Mexico presided on the occasion. The SREC was formally constituted, with Juan Bautista Cabrera chosen to be the first bishop. This name implies that, from the beginning, the Church had a clearly Protestant flavour, which always constituted a problem for all the Spanish Anglicans who felt drawn towards the High Church tradition. In 1881, Lord William Plunket, the future Archbishop of Dublin, paid his first visit to Seville. That same year, the second Synod of the Reformed Church was held in Seville, under the presidency of Bishop Cabrera. Four congregations from Monistrol, San Vicente, Salamanca and Villaescusa were received into the SREC. A fraternal salutation of Christian love was sent to the Lusitanian Church in Portugal. A Prayer Book was also published in 1881 for use in the SREC, under the title of Oficios Divinos y Administración de los Sacramentos y otras Ordenanzas en la Iglesia Española. It was revised in 1889. An English translation of the revised version was published in the same year in Dublin. One unique feature of this Book is the incorporation of the ancient Spanish Mozarabic Rite into the Eucharist.

In March 1882, Bishop Cabrera paid another visit to Seville. After a careful examination of the churches, he reported the progress of the work as "the Bible is becoming better known; publications of a Scriptural character are now earnestly bought; the young are being trained in the knowledge of God, and there is a real and deep desire to hear the oral preaching of the Gospel of Christ." In the early part of 1887, Rev. Palomares and his congregation welcomed Abram Newkirk Littlejohn, Bishop of Long Island, during his visit to Seville. The bishop expressed his pleasure at seeing the congregation, and pointed out the hymns used in the Seville church were the same as those used in the American Episcopal Church. The Rev. W. Preston, Vicar of Holy Trinity Church, Runcorn, also visited Seville at this time. In March 1888, The Archbishop of Dublin paid another visit to Seville. According to Palomares's report, by October 1894, the Church in Seville had 132 communicants, 150 children in schools, and 205 gratuitous medical visits.

In 1980, the SREC became an extra-provincial diocese under the metropolitan authority of the Archbishop of Canterbury. Carlos López Lozano serves as the current bishop (as of 2022).

=== Villaescusa ===
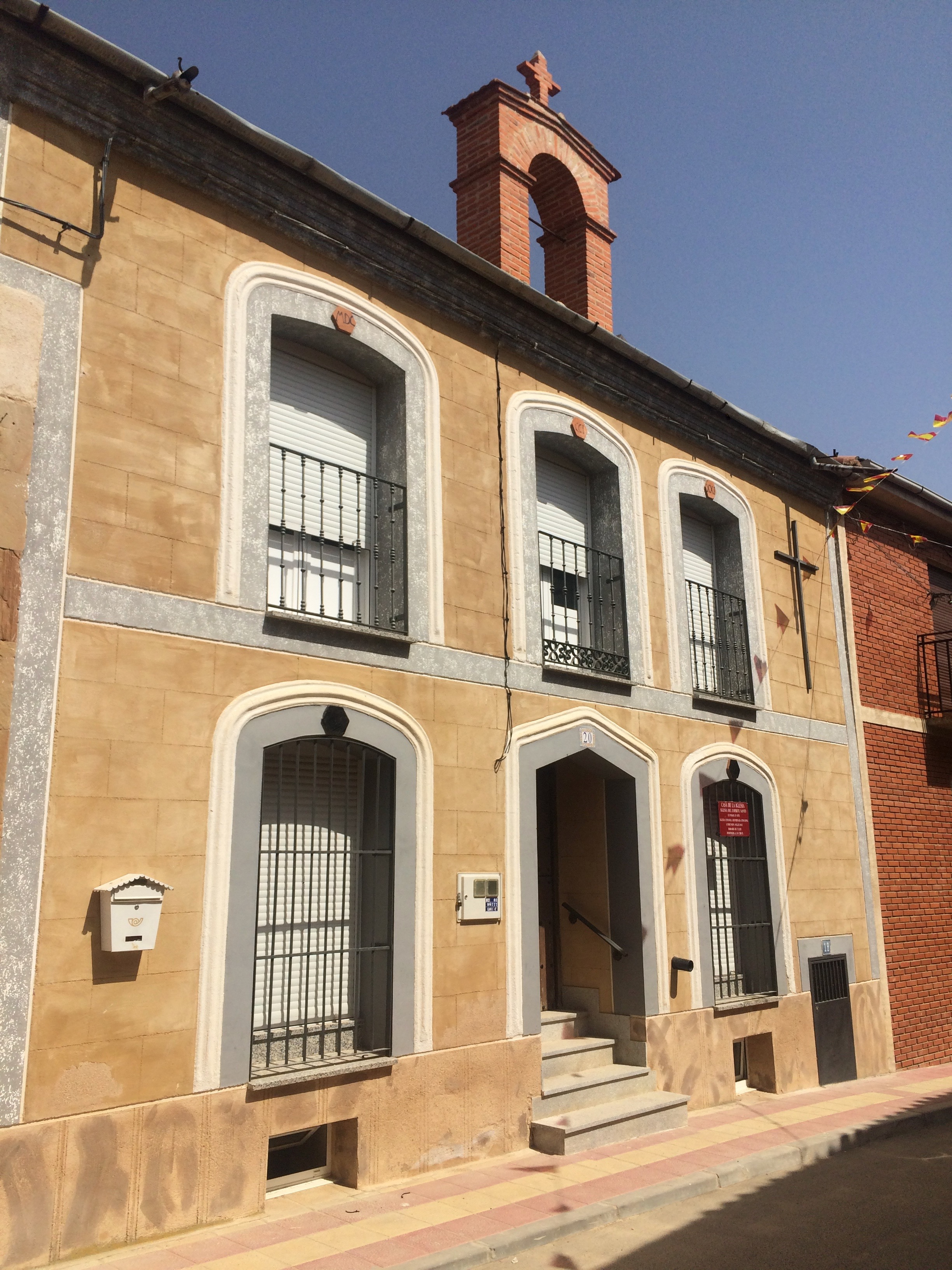
Anglican Church of the Holy Spirit at Villaescusa

In 1870, a young carpenter of Villaescusa, Zamora, named Melquíades Andrés, in one of his visits to Fuentesaúco, purchased a portion of the Bible from a colporteur of the British and Foreign Bible Society. He first showed the book to his sister, and later to their neighbours and friends. Townspeople started to visit his home for Bible readings, a small congregation was thus formed at his "Bible-house". When their secret leaked out, the Curé was greatly angered. They suffered many petty persecutions, and were threatened with excommunication.

When these "Bible-house" Christians learned that a congregation of reformers had been formed at Salamanca, they sent a commission inviting the Pastor to visit them. The Rev. Señor Rodrigo acceded to their request, and undertook the spiritual oversight of the congregation. In May 1880, a room was hired as a chapel. Rev. Rodrigo attended periodically for the administration of the Sacraments. In the absence of the Pastor, Melquíades, who in all respects was the Father of the Church, conducted the services. In 1881, the Villaescusa congregation was received into the SREC. When Rev. Rodrigo was transferred to serve the Church at Málaga, Rev. Palomares García was appointed to take charge of the congregations of Salamanca and Villaescusa.

The SREC experienced persecution in Francoist Spain. In 1936, the Franco government seized the church's building in Villaescusa and the congregation declined.

=== Madrid ===
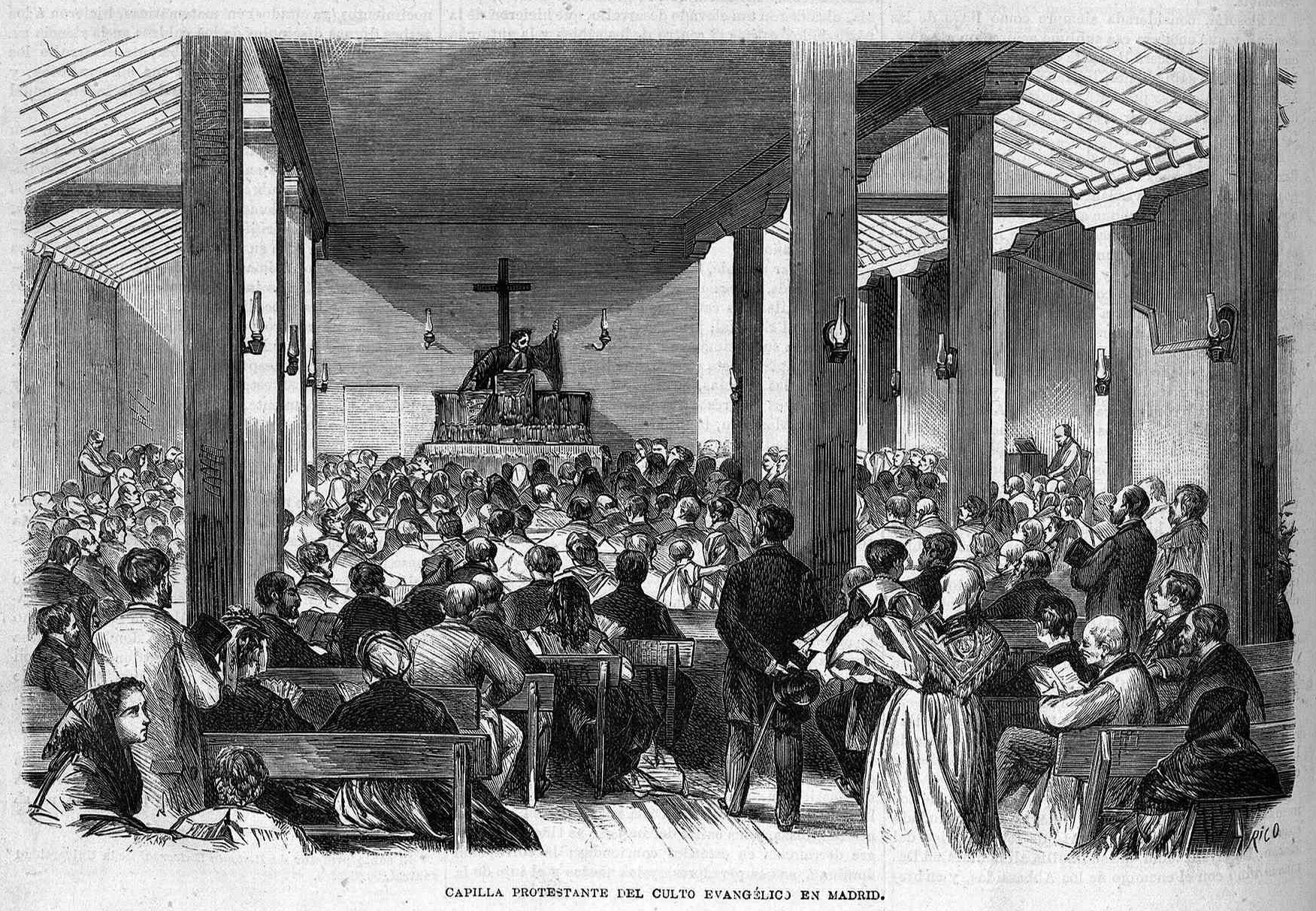
Protestant chapel at the Calle de la Madera Baja (La Ilustración de Madrid, 1870)

The congregation of the Redeemer was founded in 1869 in the capital city of Madrid. Their printer's shop-turned-chapel at the Calle de la Madera Baja was a small, old and uncomfortable building to worship. In 1881, Lord William Plunket made his first appeal for funds to purchase a site and to build a new church. The laying of the foundation stone took place on 19 March 1891 in the Calle de la Beneficencia, with a very simple ceremony and very few persons present, because of the ban on public demonstrations of the Dissenting Church. On 27 September of the same year, part of the building was ready, and it was decided to move the service from Madera Baja to the new building. The previous Sunday, 10 September, the last service was held in the old place. In November 1892, notice was given to the Society in London that the neo-Gothic church building was completed and ready for the opening, and Lord Plunket decided to visit Madrid for the consecration, but it was postponed until 1893.

=== Valencia ===
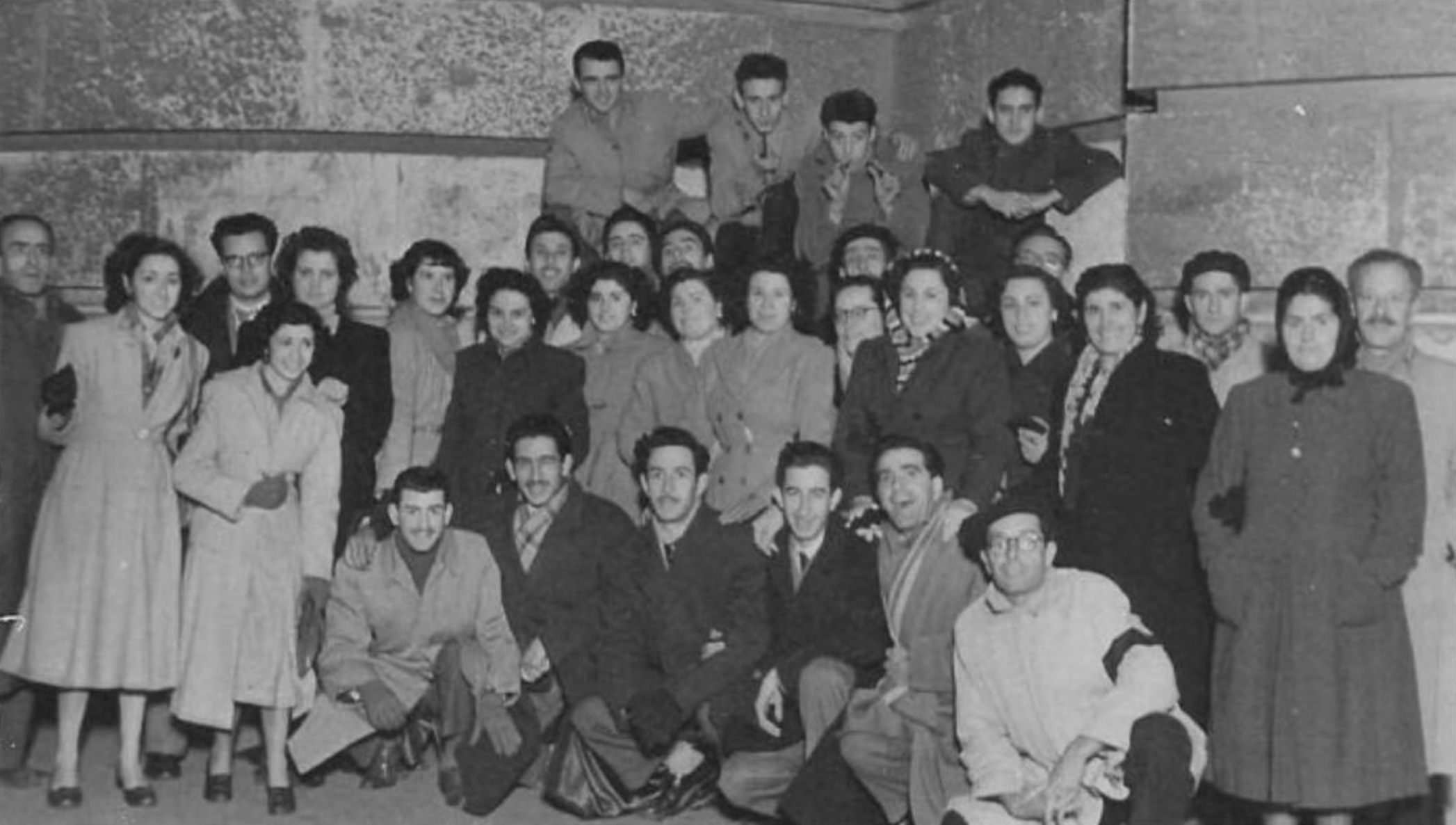
Congregation of San Jaime/Jesus Christ of Valencia, late 1930s and early 1940s.

In 1906, with the arrival of Pastor Daniel Regaliza Aguado of Villaescusa, the Spanish Reformed Episcopal Church was established in Valencia. The need to form a church in Valencia came from the desire of the Bishop Juan Bautista Cabrera, born and educated in this region, but also from the interest of a foreign family named "MacAndrew" residing in this city. Thus, the parish of San Jaime was formally constituted with 12 communicant members with their 16 children and 18 catechumens. The parish name would be changed to "Church of Jesus Christ" (Iglesia de Jesucristo) after the Spanish Civil War. At first the services were held at Regaliza's house at 25 Bonaire Street. When in 1907 they moved to 8 Corona Street, where the church was consecrated, Bishop Cabrera attended the inauguration and dedication. In 1922, they moved to 31 Baix Street in the neighbourhood of El Carme. During the Civil War (1938), a bomb destroyed the building and Regaliza was seriously injured. During recovery from the injury, he was supported by numerous residents from El Carme, who were grateful for his work and sympathy. As they were left without premises, they had to return to the previous house on Corona Street and continued to serve the congregation until 1943, one year after Regaliza's death. Today, the church is located at 38 Dos d'Abril, in the neighbourhood of Montolivet. Some prominent leaders of the Valencian Church were direct descendants of Bonifaci Ferrer, who was the brother of Saint Vincent Ferrer and made the first translation of the Bible into Valencian.

== Church of England ==
Building of the Gibraltar Cathedral began in 1825 and the church was completed in 1832. It was raised to cathedral status in 1842, with the creation of the Diocese of Gibraltar which covered a vast area stretching from Portugal to the Caspian Sea. It was renamed Diocese of Gibraltar in Europe (Diocese in Europe) in January 1981.

In 1864, a small chaplaincy was appointed to the British Embassy in Madrid, and services were held in a private house by Rev. William Campbell. A small church known as the "British Chapel" (Capilla Británica) was erected in 1923. The church has severed its exclusive ties with the British Embassy since its official opening in 1925. Today, the British Chapel, along with a number of Anglican churches scattered throughout Spain, such as All Saints' Church, Puerto de la Cruz and St George's Church, Barcelona, belong to the Diocese in Europe.

== See also ==
- The Bible in Spain
- Baptist Evangelical Union of Spain
- Evangelical Presbyterian Church in Spain
- Federation of Evangelical Religious Entities of Spain
- Reformed Churches in Spain
- Spanish Evangelical Church
- Spanish Evangelical Lutheran Church
- Religion in Spain
  - Catholic Church in Spain
  - Eastern Orthodoxy in Spain
