= Spanish Evangelical Lutheran Church =

The Spanish Evangelical Lutheran Church (Spanish: Iglesia Evangélica Luterana Española or IELE) is a Confessional Lutheran church. It is in communion with other confessional Lutheran churches in the European Lutheran Conference (ELC) and globally in the International Lutheran Council (ILC). It adheres unreservedly to the historical confessions of the Lutheran Church: the Book of Concord of 1580, which they see as agreeing with Holy Scripture.

== History of Lutheranism in Spain ==
The Lutheran Church in Spain has its origins in the time of the Protestant Reformation, but the Spanish Inquisition actively persecuted Lutherans and other Protestants because of their evangelical faith. They suffered prison, exile, and other hardships. The Inquisition drove Lutherans out of Spain.

About five centuries after its cessation, the presence of Lutheranism in Spain was restored. In 2000, the Evangelical Lutheran Church of Argentina (IELA), working with a Lutheran family in Toledo, Spain, sent a missionary to lead outreach efforts. A second missionary from the Argentine church was sent in 2002 to build upon that work, establishing a congregation and extending evangelistic work to other areas of Spain. The IELE was recognized by the Spanish government in 2004.

The IELE's first Spanish pastor was installed in October 2010. The IELE has several members enrolled in pastoral programs. The church has a congregation in Asturias in northern Spain, and mission posts in Madrid, Catalonia, and Andalucía.

== Difference from the Spanish Evangelical Church ==
The similarly-named Spanish Evangelical Church (Spanish: Iglesia Evangélica Española or IEE) is the result of the merger in 1869 of several Protestant churches—Congregationalists, Methodists, Presbyterians, and Lutherans—and is a union denomination. The IELE, in contrast, forms relationships and partnerships only with other confessional Lutheran churches.

== See also ==
- Protestantism in Spain
  - Anglicanism in Spain
  - Baptist Evangelical Union of Spain
  - Evangelical Presbyterian Church in Spain
  - Federation of Evangelical Religious Entities of Spain
  - Reformed Churches in Spain
