= Baptist Evangelical Union of Spain =

- Unión Evangélica Bautista de España
- Abbreviation: UEBE
- Classification: Evangelical Christianity
- Theology: Baptist
- Associations: Baptist World Alliance, Federation of Evangelical Religious Entities of Spain
- Headquarters: Madrid, Spain
- Origin: 1923
- Congregations: 175
- Members: 11,438
- Missionary organization: Misiones Internacionales
- Aid organization: Ministerio de Obra Social
- Seminaries: Faculty of Theology of the Evangelical Baptist Union of Spain
- Official website: uebe.org

The Baptist Evangelical Union of Spain (Spanish: Unión Evangélica Bautista de España) is a Baptist denomination. It is affiliated with the Federation of Evangelical Religious Entities of Spain and the Baptist World Alliance. The headquarters is in Madrid.

== History ==
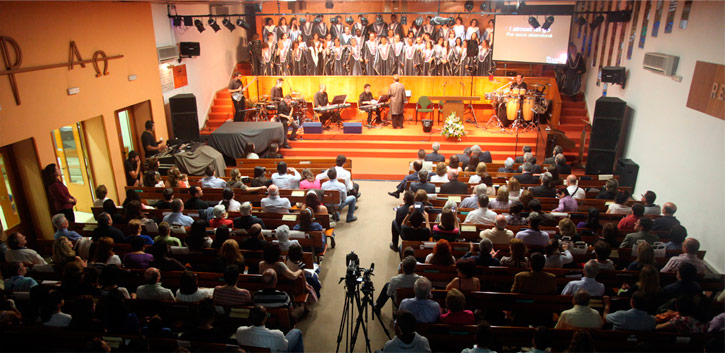
Worship service at First Evangelical Baptist Church of Madrid.

The Union has its origins in the establishment of the first church Baptist in Madrid by William J. Knapp in 1870. In the 1920s, several Baptist churches were also founded by an American mission of the International Mission Board. In 1922, the Baptist Theological Institute (now Faculty of Theology of the Evangelical Baptist Union of Spain) was inaugurated in Barcelona. In 1923, the Union is officially founded. In 1928, the first convention took place. In 2004, the Union had 91 churches. According to a census published by the association in 2023, it claimed 175 churches and 11,438 members.

== Missionary organization ==
The Convention has a missionary organization, Misiones Internacionales.

== Humanitarian organization ==
It has a humanitarian organization, Ministerio de Obra Social.

== See also ==
- Protestantism in Spain
  - Anglicanism in Spain
  - Evangelical Presbyterian Church in Spain
  - Reformed Churches in Spain
  - Spanish Evangelical Church
  - Spanish Evangelical Lutheran Church
