= Eastern Orthodoxy in Spain =

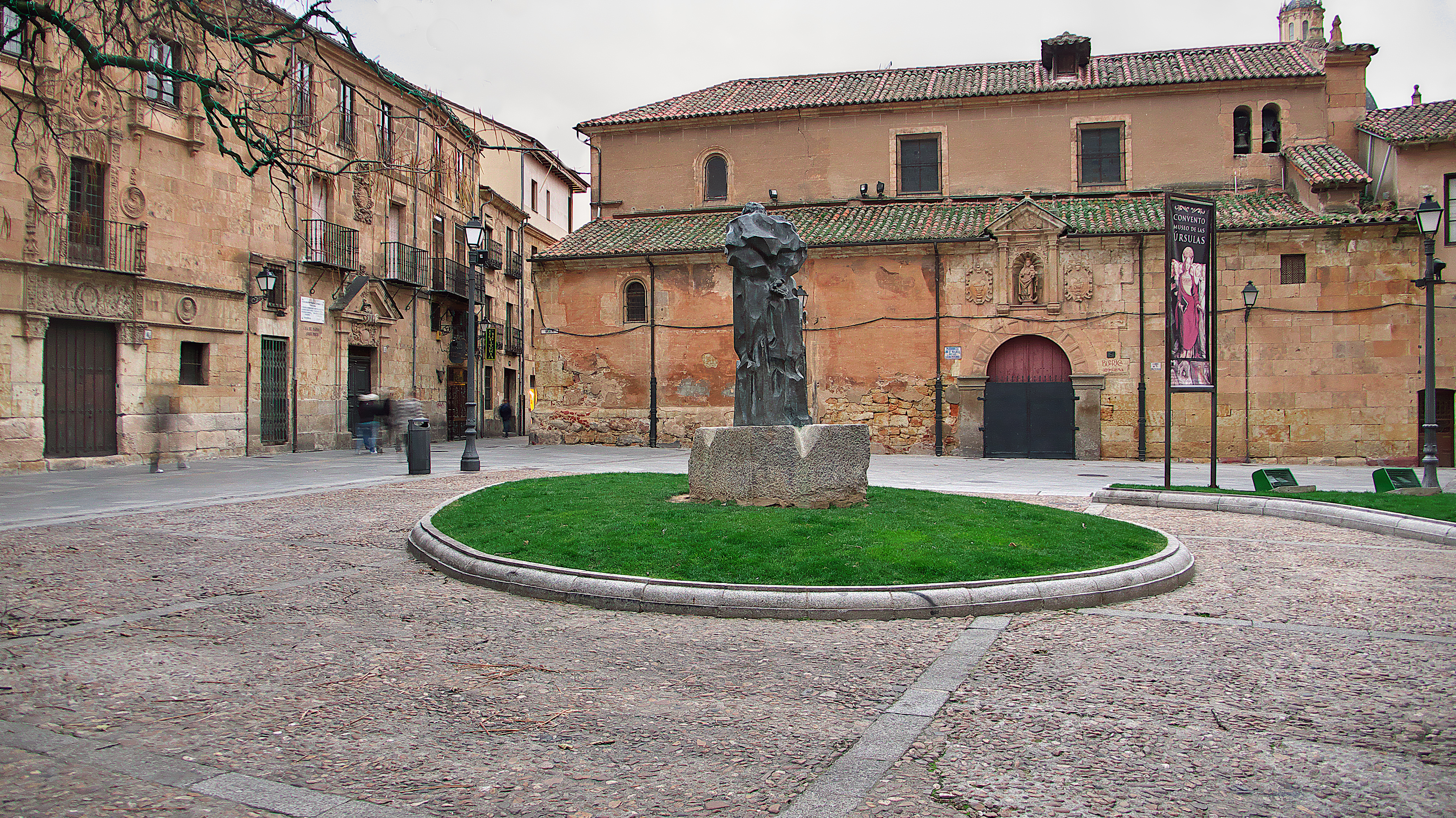
Romanian Orthodox Church, Salamanca

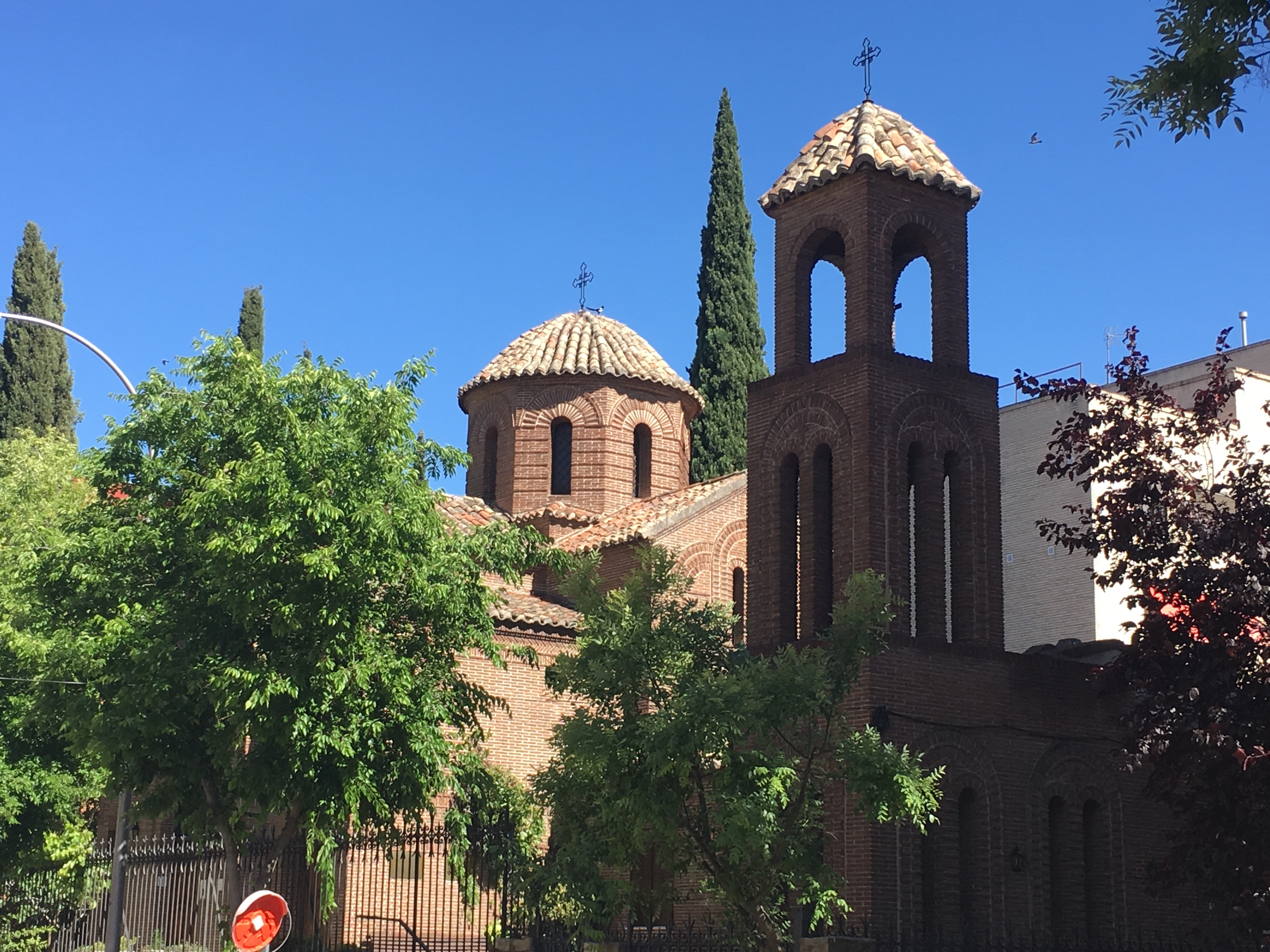
Greek Orthodox Cathedral of St Andrew and St Demetrius, Madrid

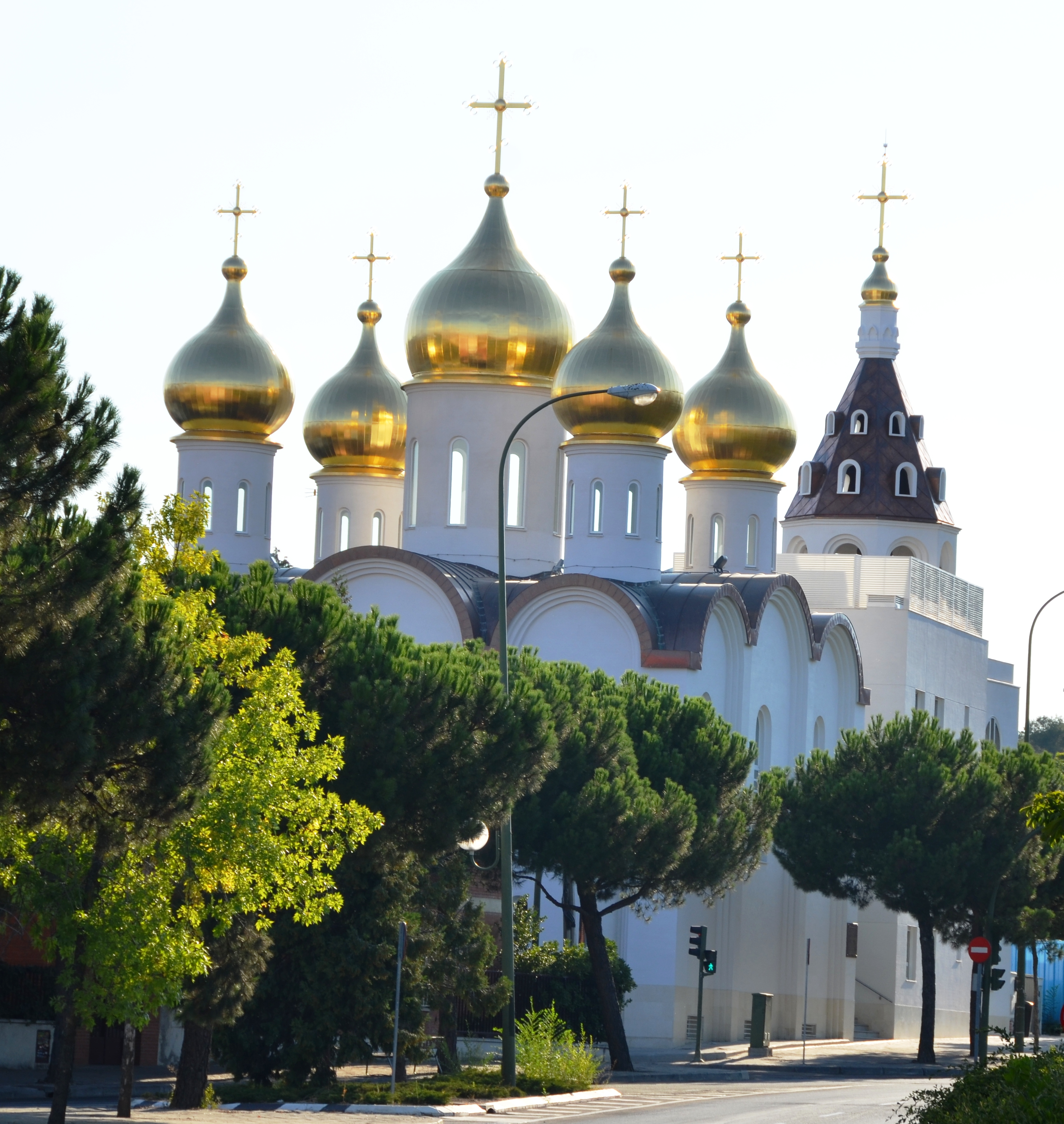
Russian Orthodox Church, Madrid

Spain is not a traditionally Orthodox country, as after the Great Schism of 1054 the Spanish Christians (at that time controlling the northern half of the Iberian Peninsula) were in the sphere of influence of the Church of Rome.

The territory is covered by the Metropolis of Spain and Portugal (Constantinople), Diocese of Madrid and Lisbon (Patriarchal Exarchate in Western Europe (Moscow Patriarchate) or PEWE), Diocese of Western Europe (Russian Orthodox Church Outside of Russia, Moscow-ROCOR), Diocese of Western and Central Europe (Bulgaria), Diocese of Western Europe (Serbia), and the Metropolitanate of Western and Southern Europe (Romania).

== See also ==
- Religion in Spain
  - Catholic Church in Spain
  - Protestantism in Spain
    - Anglicanism in Spain
- Serbian Orthodox Eparchy of Western Europe (Serbian Patriarchate)
- Diocese of the Russian Orthodox Church in Spain and Portugal (Moscow Patriarchate)

== Literature ==
- Kiminas, Demetrius (2009). The Ecumenical Patriarchate: A History of Its Metropolitanates with Annotated Hierarch Catalogs. Wildside Press LLC. ISBN 9781434458766.
