= St George's Church, Barcelona =

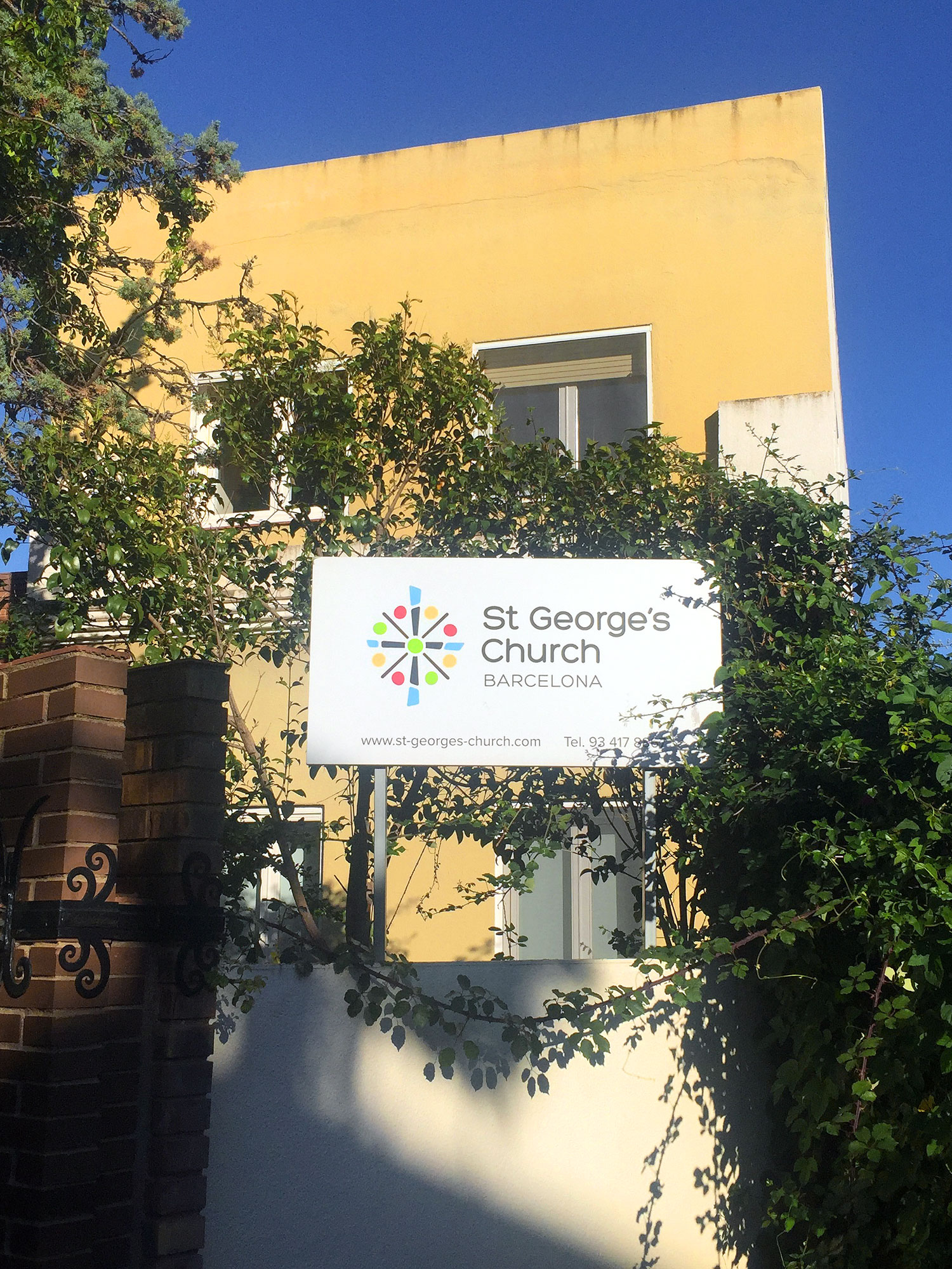

- Location of St George's in Catalonia Location of St George's in Spain
- 41°24′26.7″N 02°07′43.8″E
- Location: Carrer d’Horaci, 38, 08022 Barcelona
- Country: Spain
- Denomination: Anglican
- Website: st-georges-church.com

History
- Consecrated: 7 May 1905 (old church); 6 May 1973 (new church)

Administration
- Province: Canterbury
- Diocese: Europe
- Archdeaconry: Gibraltar

St George's Church (Catalan: Església anglicana de Sant Jordi; Spanish: Iglesia anglicana de San Jorge) is an Anglican church in Barcelona, Spain. It is part of the Diocese in Europe of the Church of England.

The church conducts English-language services of Christian worship in Barcelona. It is located in the Sant Gervasi – la Bonanova district, and the nearest Barcelona Metro station is Avinguda Tibidabo.

== History ==
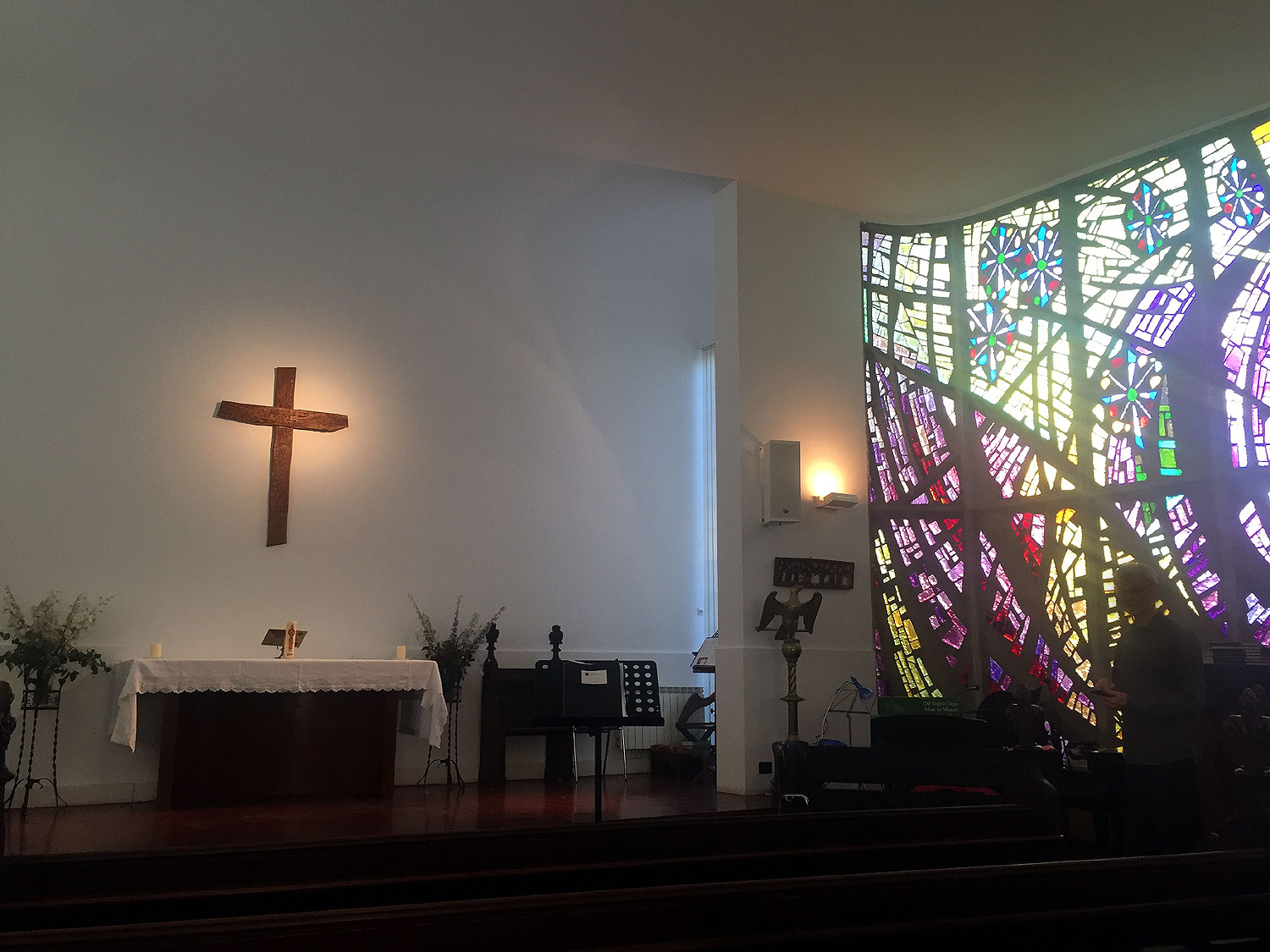
Interior of St George's Church

During the mid-19th century, Church of England worship was held in the official residence of the British Consul in Barcelona.

With the support of the Colonial & Continental Church Society (C&CCS), the Consul-General and the British community in Barcelona raised funds to erect a church at Rosellon 250 (Carrer de Rosseló), close to the junction of Passeig de Gracia and Avinguda Diagonal. The new church was built in 1904-05 and was consecrated in May 1905.

Between 1936 and 1945, St George's was temporarily closed during the Spanish Civil War and World War II.

In 1971–72, a new building was constructed, and in July 1972 St George's Church moved to the present building on Carrer d’Horaci in the north-west of the city. It was consecrated on 6 May 1973.

== See also ==
- Anglicanism in Spain
