= Reformed Churches in Spain =

Conservative Christian denomination in Spain

The Reformed Churches in Spain (Spanish: Iglesias Reformadas de España) is a confessional Calvinist denomination in Spain.

The group currently has seven congregations spread across the kingdom: churches in Mataró and Pineda, both near Barcelona; in Madrid; in Almuñécar and Málaga in southern Spain; and in La Laguna, Tenerife and Telde (Gran Canaria) both in the Canary Islands.

The churches adhere to the Three Forms of Unity, and some of them recognise the Westminster Confession of Faith. The Malaga congregation allows paedocommunion, while all of the congregations practice infant baptism.

The denomination maintains good ecclesiastical contact with the Evangelical Presbyterian Church in England and Wales, the Free Church of Scotland, and the Reformed Churches in the Netherlands (Liberated). It is also a member of the International Conference of Reformed Churches.

== See also ==
- Protestantism in Spain
  - Anglicanism in Spain
  - Evangelical Presbyterian Church in Spain
  - Federation of Evangelical Religious Entities of Spain
  - Spanish Evangelical Church
  - Spanish Evangelical Lutheran Church
  - Baptist Evangelical Union of Spain
