= Federation of Evangelical Religious Entities of Spain =

Spanish organization of Evangelical Protestant denominations

The Federation of Evangelical Religious Entities of Spain (Spanish: Federación de Entidades Religiosas Evangélicas de España or FEDERE) is a Spanish organization of Protestant denominations, mostly Evangelical in orientation.

== Organizational structure ==
- Consejo Evangélico Autonómico de Andalucía
- Consejo Evangélico de Asturias
- Consejo Evangélico de Cantabria
- Consejo Evangélico de Castilla León
- Consejo Evangélico de Extremadura
- Consell Evangèlic de les Illes Balears
- Consejo Evangélico de Murcia
- Consejo Evangélico del País Vasco
- Consell Evangèlic de la Comunitat Valenciana
- Consejo Evangélico de Aragón
- Consejo Evangélico de Canarias
- Consejo Evangélico de Castilla La Mancha
- Consell Evangèlic de Catalunya
- Consejo Evangélico de Galicia
- Consejo Evangélico de Madrid
- Consejo Evangélico de Navarra
- Consejo Evangélico de La Rioja

== See also ==
- Protestantism in Spain
  - Anglicanism in Spain
  - Evangelical Presbyterian Church in Spain
  - Reformed Churches in Spain
  - Spanish Evangelical Church
  - Spanish Evangelical Lutheran Church
  - Baptist Evangelical Union of Spain
