= Cathedral of St Andrew and St Demetrius =

Cathedral Church of St Andrew and St Demetrius
- Cathedral of Saints Andrew and Demetrius
- Iglesia Catedral de los Santos Andrés y Demetrio
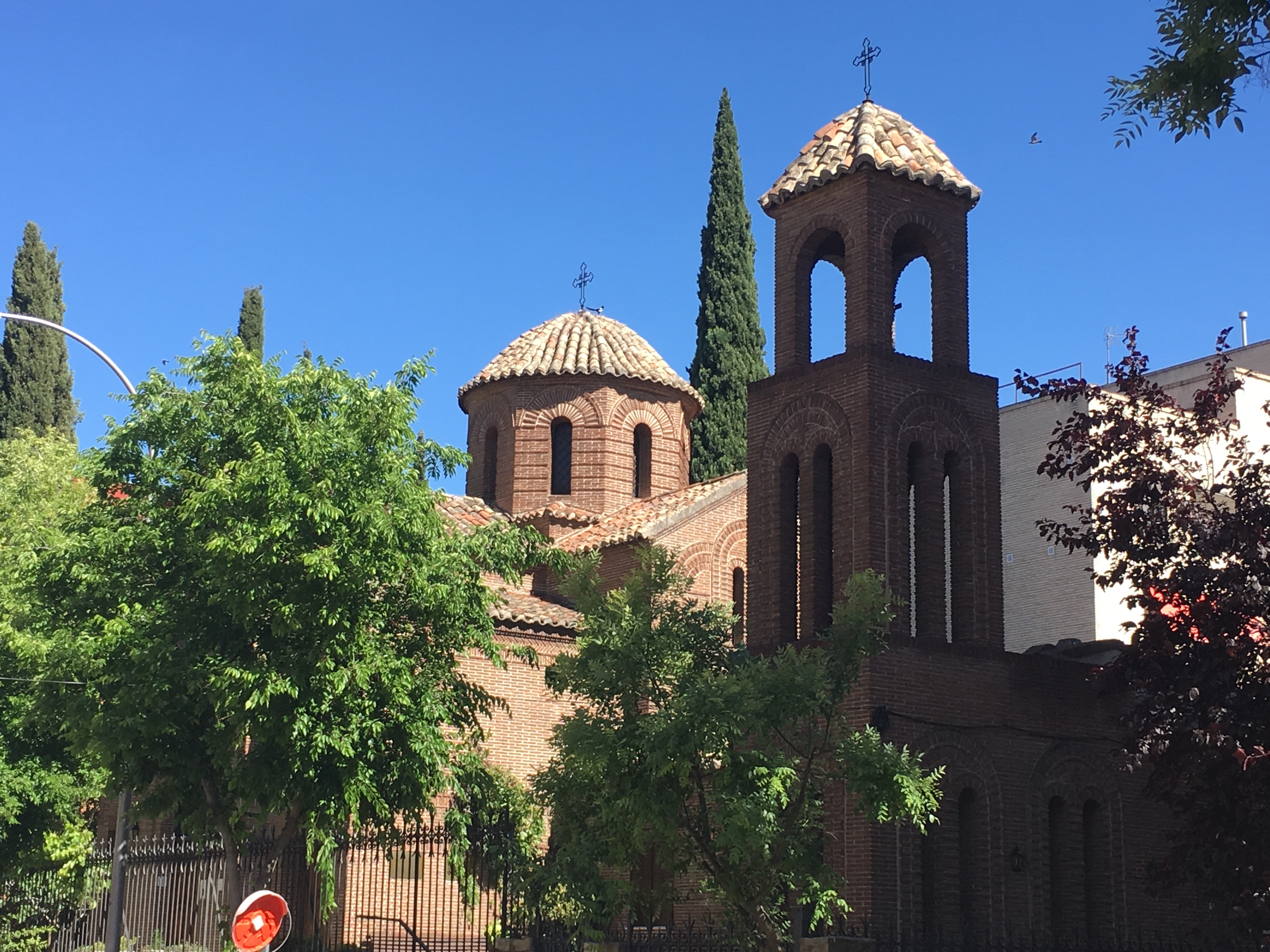
- The cathedral in 2019
- Cathedral Church of St Andrew and St Demetrius
- 40.457469°N 3.672875°W
- Location: Madrid
- Address: Calle Nicaragua, 12
- Country: Spain
- Denomination: Greek Orthodox

History
- Status: Cathedral
- Dedication: Andrew the Apostle and Demetrius of Thessaloniki

Architecture
- Functional status: Active
- Style: Byzantine
- Groundbreaking: 1971
- Completed: 1973

Administration
- Province: Constantinople
- Metropolis: Spain and Portugal

The Cathedral Church of St Andrew and St Demetrius (Spanish: Iglesia Catedral de los Santos Andrés y Demetrio; Greek: Ιερός Καθεδρικός Ναός των Αγίων Ανδρέου και Δημητρίου Μαδρίτης, romanized: Ierós Kathedrikós Naós ton Agíon Andréou kai Dimitríou Madrítis, lit. 'Holy Cathedral of Saints Andrew and Demetrius of Madrid') is a Greek Orthodox cathedral situated on Nicaragua Street in the neighbourhood of Hispanoamérica, district of Chamartín, Madrid, Spain, which belongs to the Orthodox Church of Constantinople. Originally a church, it was granted cathedral status in 2006.

== History ==
The presence of Greek Orthodoxy in Spain dates back to the late 19th century, when some Greek merchants emigrated to the Iberian Peninsula. In 1949, the Parish of St Andrew the Apostle (Parroquia del Apóstol San Andrés) was founded in the capital city Madrid, under the jurisdiction of the Patriarch of Constantinople. The first stone of the current cathedral was laid in 1971, and construction finished in 1973, the cathedral was inaugurated in the same year. It is built in Byzantine style with a bell tower. Inside, like any other Eastern Orthodox church, an iconostasis with holy door separates the nave from the sanctuary. The interior walls are entirely covered with colourful fresco paintings and elaborate decorative motifs made by Greek artists.

== Gallery ==
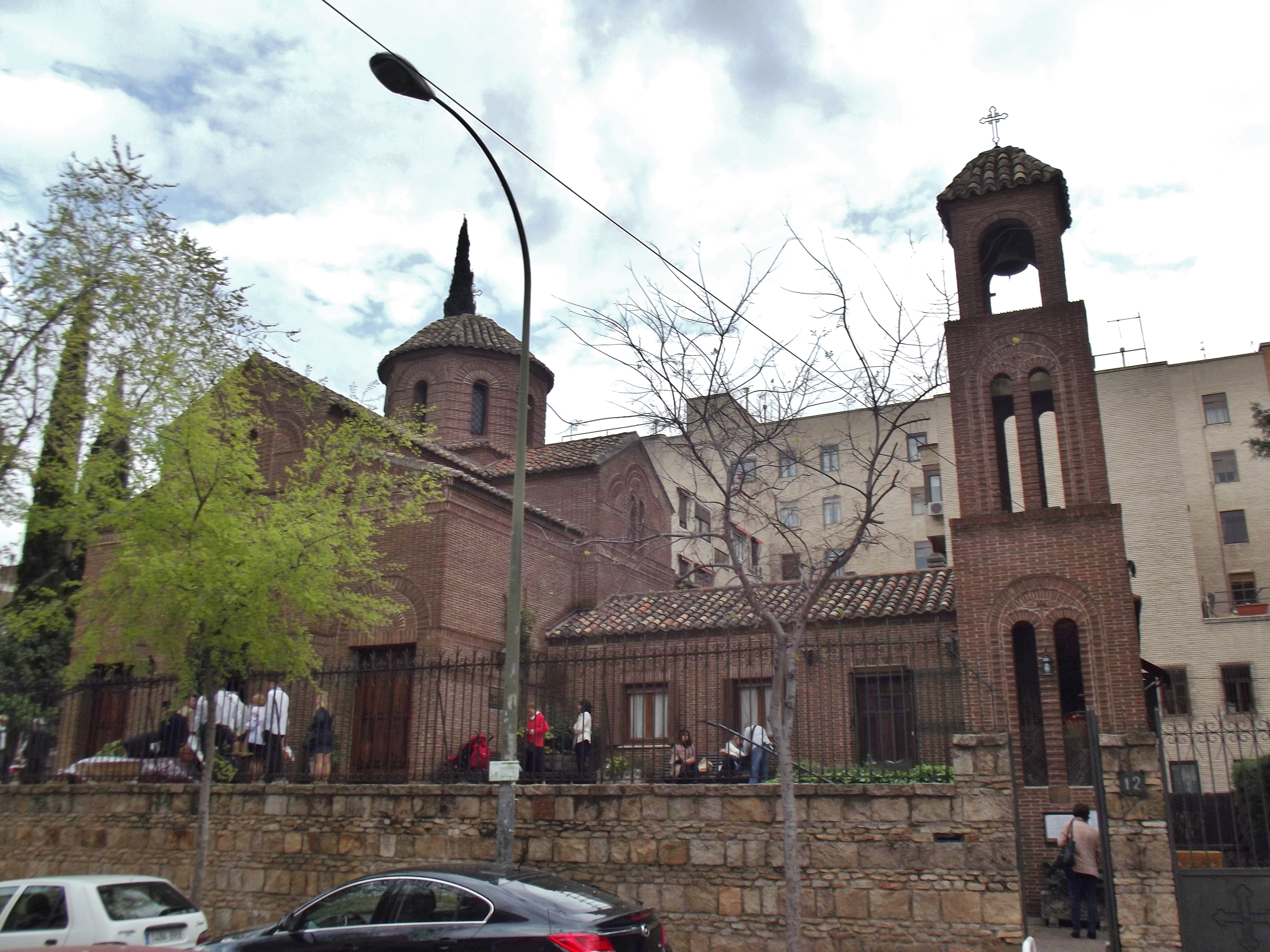
The cathedral in 2015

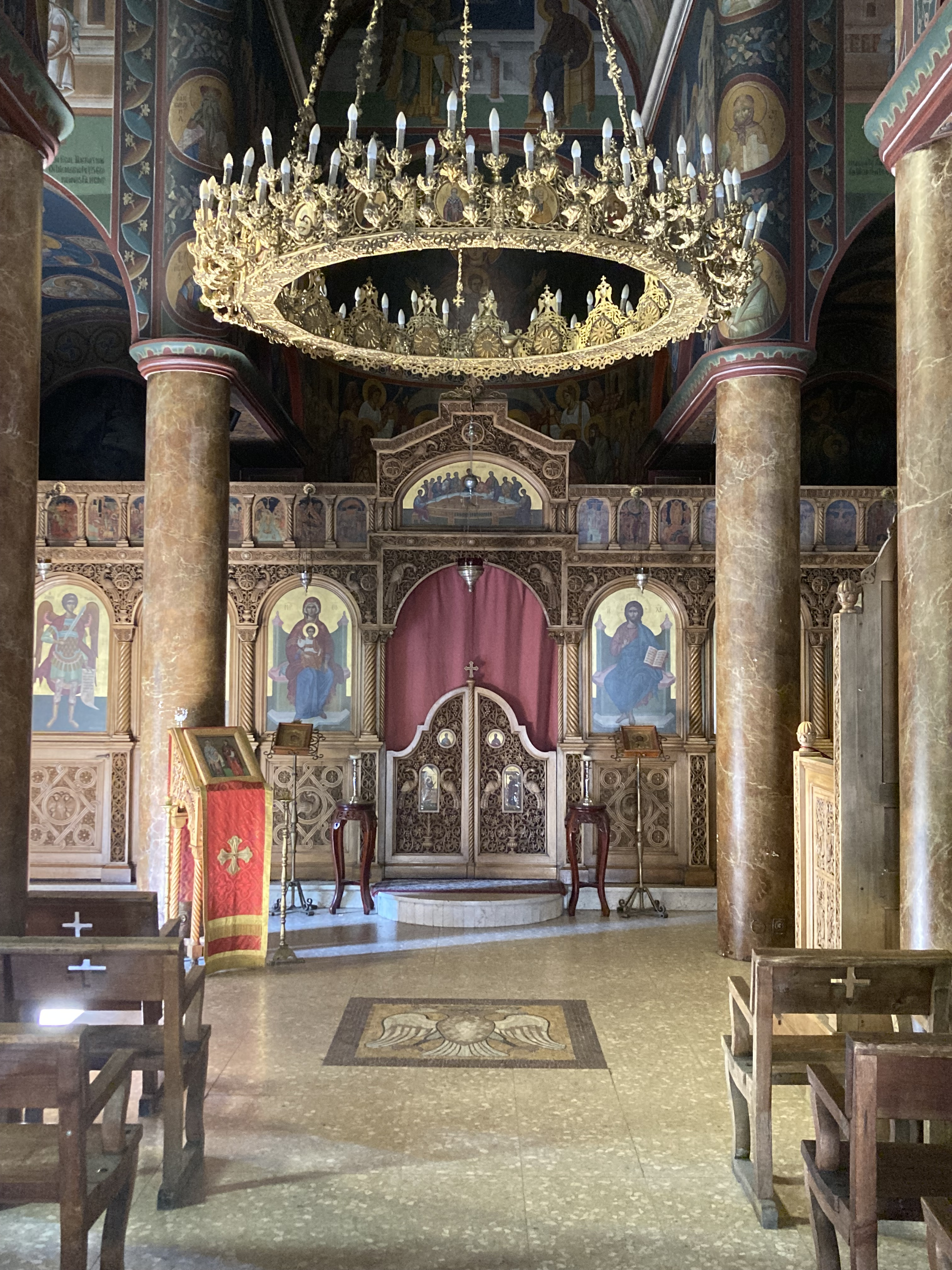
Iconostasis

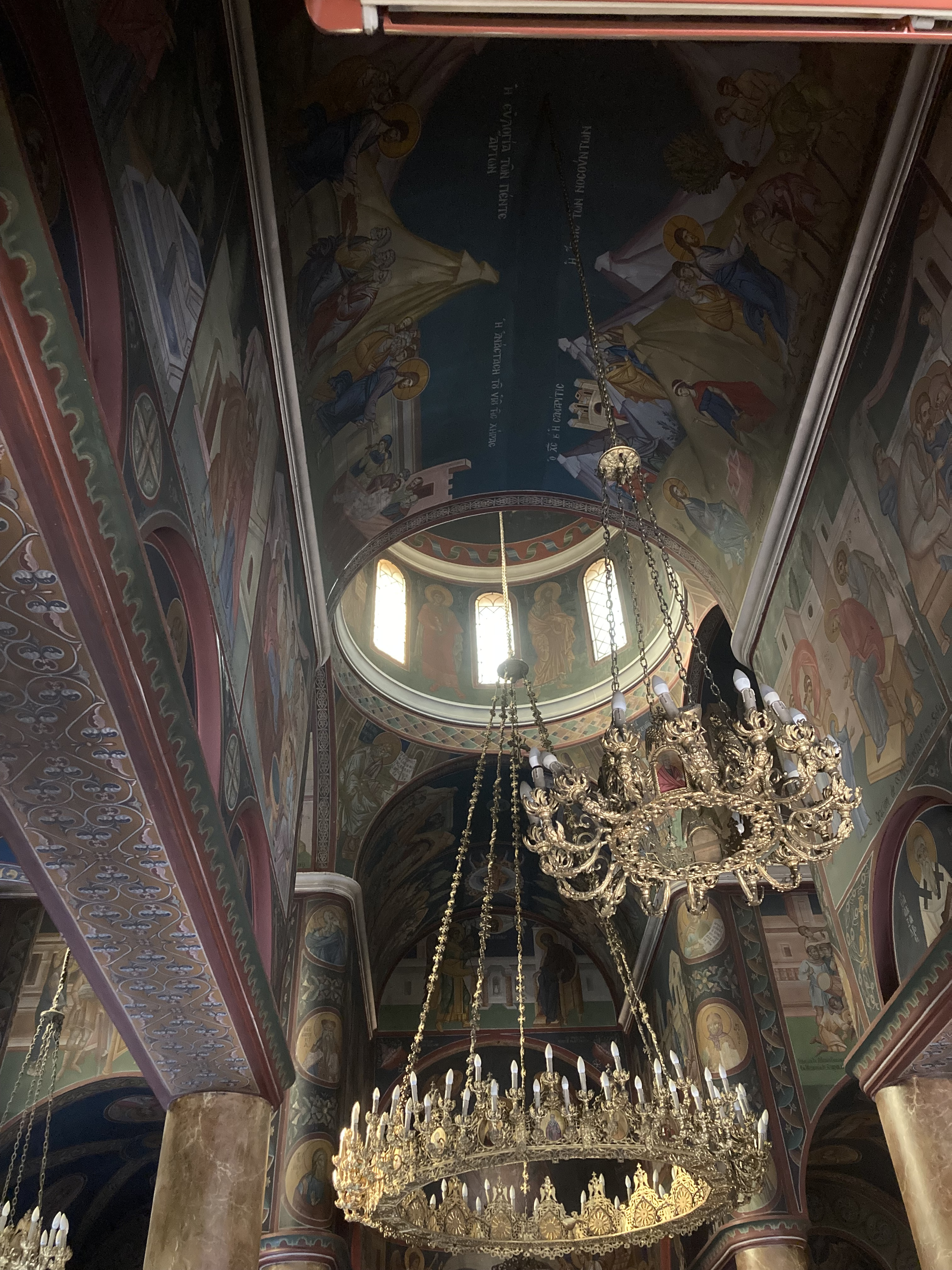
Vault

== See also ==
- Eastern Orthodoxy in Spain
- Greek Orthodox Metropolis of France
