= Presbyterian Church in Italy =

- Classification: Evangelical Protestant
- Orientation: Calvinism
- Theology: Conservative & confessional
- Governance: Presbyterian
- Region: Italia
- Origin: 1996
- Branched from: Presbyterian Church of Brazil
- Congregations: 3
- Official website: en.chiesapresbiteriana.com

The Presbyterian Church in Italy (PCI) (Italian: Chiesa Presbiteriana in Italia) is a Presbyterian church in Italy, formed from the missionary work of the Presbyterian Agency for Transcultural Missions (PATM), Presbyterian Church of Brazil (PCB).

== History ==
Presbyterianism established itself in Italy from the Church of Scotland, which founded congregations in the country in the 20th century. However, their congregations hold services in English, which makes their membership predominantly made up of Scottish immigrants in Italy.

In 1996, by Rev. Nilton Freitas and Brazilian immigrants, in the city of Turin, an evangelical congregation was formed. However, the church began to hold services in the Italian language and to welcome Italians as members.

In 2004, Rev. Humberto Arisa de Oliveira, pastor of the Presbyterian Agency for Transcultural Missions (PATM), Presbyterian Church of Brazil (PCB), moved to Turin, to assist the church started there. In 2008, the missionary moved to Legnano (Province of Milan), Lombardy, where the church was transferred.

In 2014, the church began ordaining its own elders and moved to a larger building in 2015.

In January 2020, a second church was founded in Brescia. Soon, the Presbyterian Church in Italy was formed by two local churches.

In March 2024, the denomination's third church was established in Asti.

In 2025, projects to plant three more churches were started, in the cities of Novara, Sanremo and Monza.

== Doctrine ==
As it is founded on missions by the Presbyterian Church of Brazil, the PCI is a conservative denomination. It officially subscribes to the Westminster Confession of Faith, Westminster Larger Catechism and Westminster Shorter Catechism and does not ordain women.

== Inter-church Relations ==
PCI is related to other European Presbyterian denominations such as the Evangelical Presbyterian Church in Spain, which was also founded by PATM-PCB missionaries.

Other Reformed denominations operate in Italy. The Presbyterian Church in America and United Reformed Churches in North America maintain missionaries in the country in Milan, Lecce and Perugia. In 2022, they formed the Presbyterian and Reformed Church in Italy. The PCI maintains fraternal bonds with these missionaries.

The Presbyterian Church of Pinheiros, a local church federated to the PCB, is also involved in planting another Presbyterian church in Pistoia.
