= Spanish Evangelical Church =

The Spanish Evangelical Church (Spanish: Iglesia Evangélica Española [IEE]) is a united denomination; Presbyterians, Methodists, Lutherans, Congregationalists participated in the merger. It was established in the wake of religious tolerance in Spain in 1869. The first General Assembly was in Seville in 1872, where the name of the Spanish Christian Church was adopted, later changed to the current name.

In 1980 it was officially recognised by the government. It is a member of the Evangelical Federation of Spain, and the World Communion of Reformed Churches and has good contact with the Spanish Reformed Episcopal Church and the World Methodist Council.

It recognises the Apostles Creed, Athanasian Creed, Nicene Creed, Heidelberg Catechism and Second Helvetic Confession. Partner churches are the Reformed Church of France, the Church of Scotland, and the Presbyterian Church in Ireland. The Iglesia Evangélica Española has about 10,000 members in 40 congregations and 50 house fellowships.

== See also ==
- Protestantism in Spain
  - Anglicanism in Spain
  - Evangelical Presbyterian Church in Spain
  - Federation of Evangelical Religious Entities of Spain
  - Reformed Churches in Spain
  - Spanish Evangelical Lutheran Church
  - Baptist Evangelical Union of Spain
