= Catholic Church in Spain =

- Spanish: Iglesia Católica en España
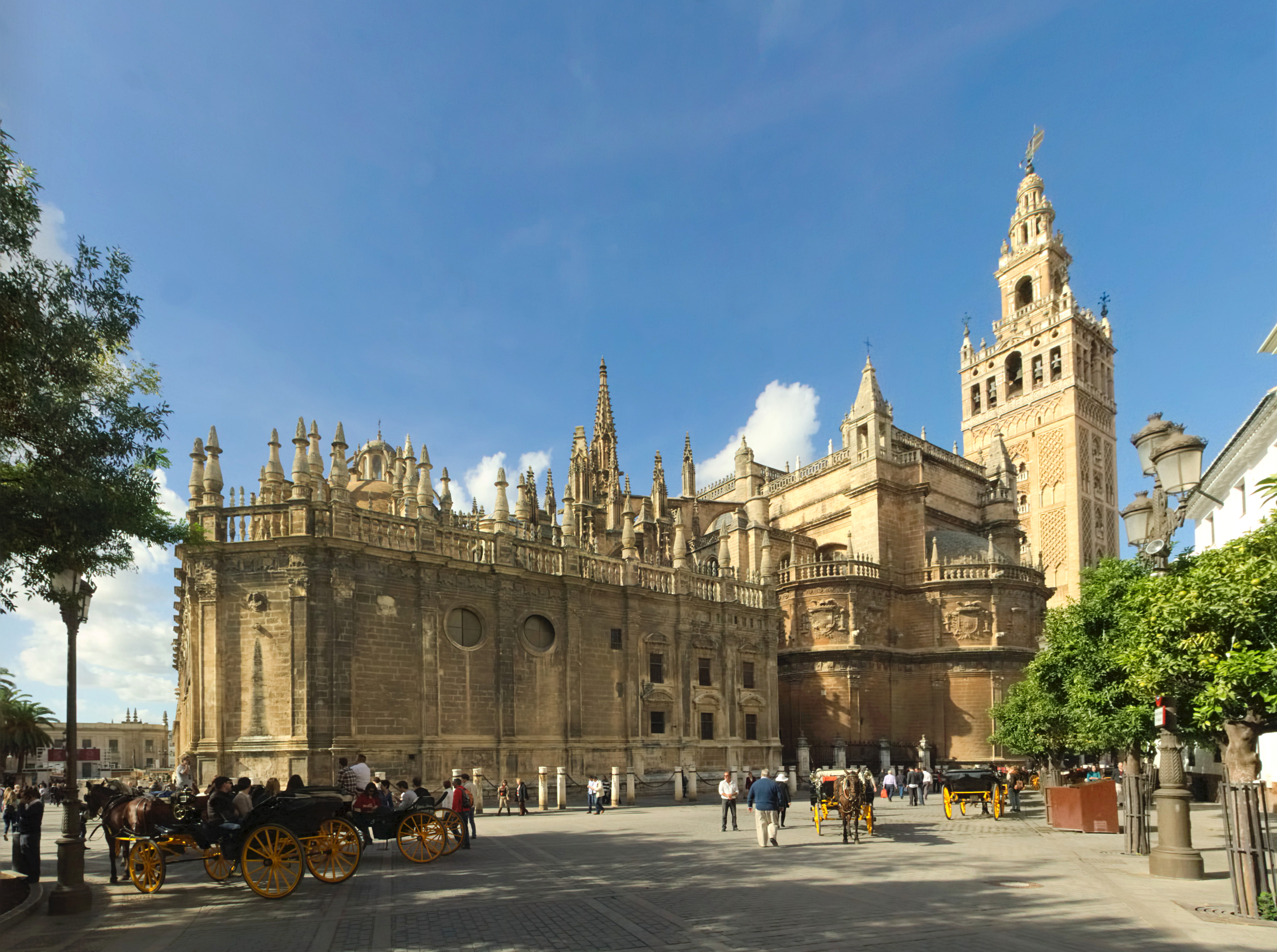
- Cathedral of Saint Mary of the See in Seville
- Type: National polity
- Classification: Catholic
- Orientation: Latin
- Scripture: Bible
- Theology: Catholic
- Polity: Episcopal
- Governance: Episcopal Conference of Spain
- Pope: Leo XIV
- Primate Archbishop of Toledo: Francisco Cerro Chaves
- President of the Episcopal Conference: Luis Javier Argüello García
- Region: Spain, Andorra
- Language: Latin, Spanish, Basque, Catalan, Galician
- Headquarters: Calle Añastro, 1. 28033 Madrid
- Founder: Apostles James and Paul
- Origin: 1st century Hispania, Roman Empire
- Separations: Protestantism in Spain; Palmarian Catholic Church
- Members: 32,364,000
- Official website: conferenciaepiscopal.es

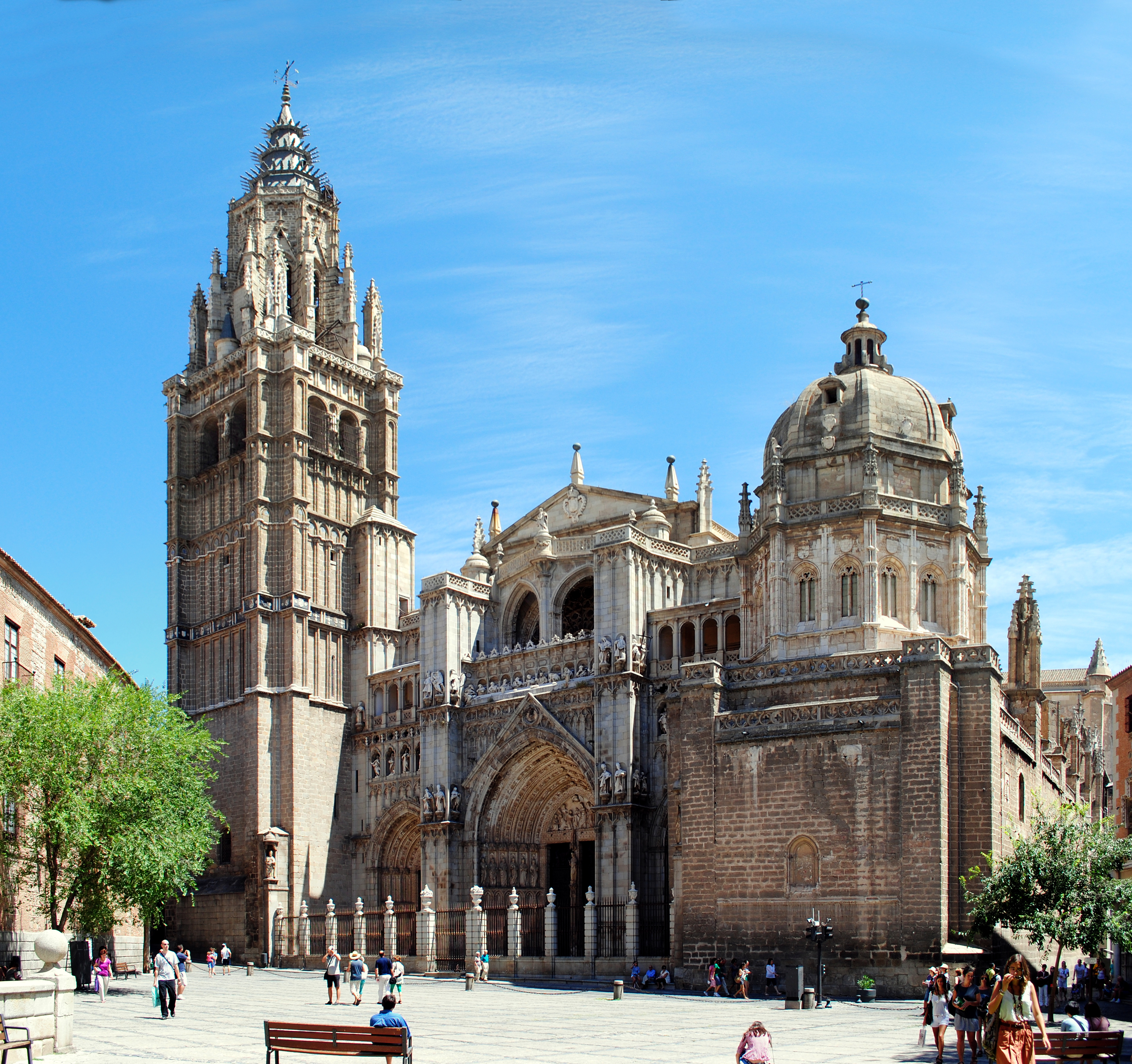
The Toledo Cathedral, seat of the Primates of Spain

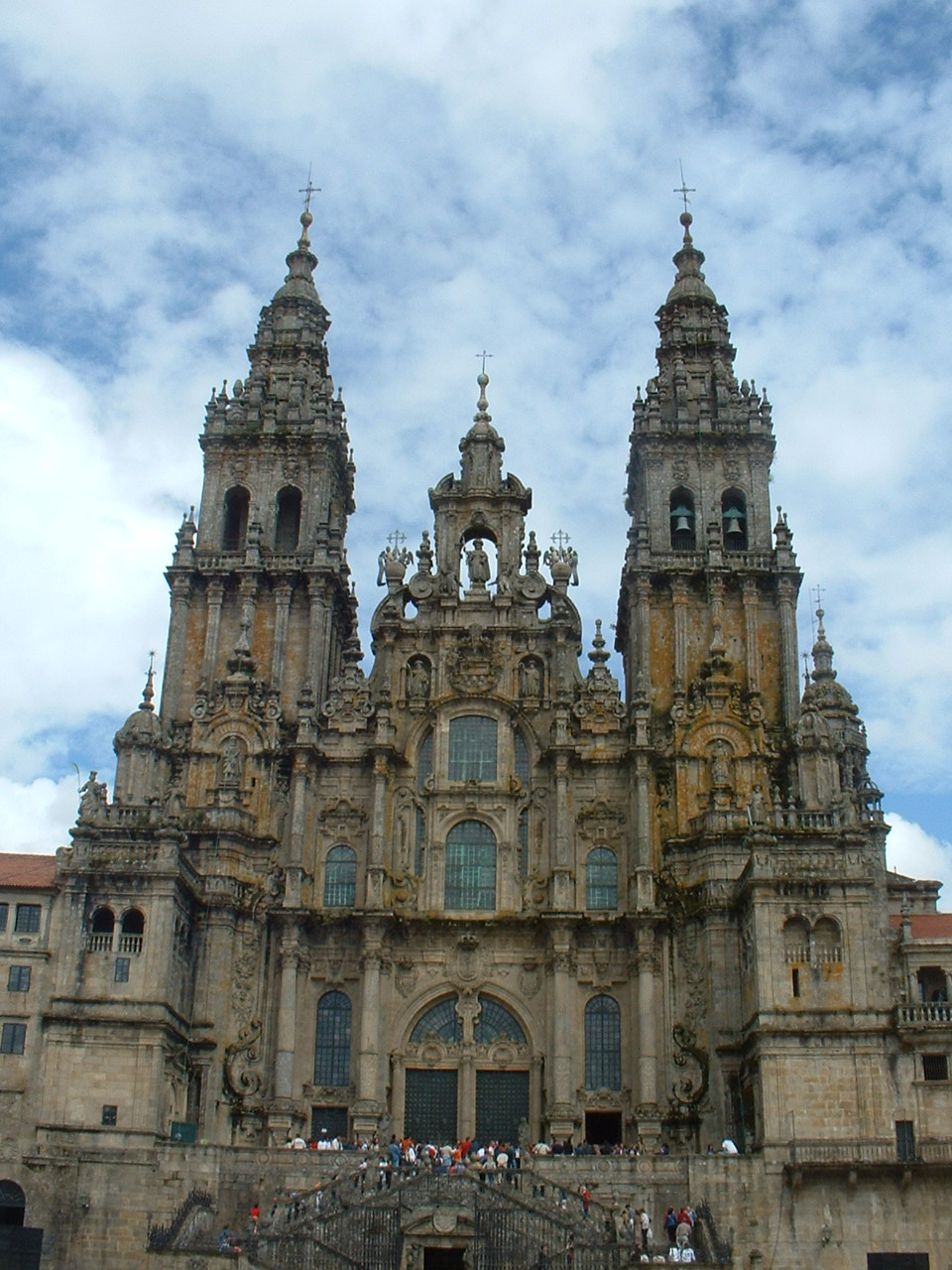
Cathedral of Santiago de Compostela

The Spanish Catholic Church, or Catholic Church in Spain, is part of the Catholic Church under the spiritual leadership of the Pope in Rome, and the Spanish Episcopal Conference.

The Spanish Constitution of 1978 establishes the non-denominationality of the State, providing that the public authorities take into account the religious beliefs of society, maintaining cooperative relations with the Catholic Church and other confessions. Thus, the relations between the Spanish State and the Holy See are regulated by the 1976 agreement and the three 1979 agreements, which modified and replaced the previous 1953 concordat.

== History ==
According to Romans 15:28, Christianity could have been present in Spain from a very early period. St. Paul intended to go to Hispania to preach the gospel there after visiting the Romans along the way. But there is no clear evidence if he ever made it. After 410 AD, Spain was taken over by the Visigoths who had been converted to Arianism around 360. From the 5th to the 7th century, about thirty synods, were held at Toledo to regulate and standardise matters of discipline, decreed uniformity of liturgy throughout the kingdom (see the Unidad católica de España). Medieval Spain was the scene of almost constant warfare between Islamic and Christian kingdoms. Islamic and Christian people generally lived in peaceful co-existence under Islamic rule such as in Al-Andalus, as long as the Christians paid the religious taxes and held no weapons in their homes, with many instances of inter-religious marriage, of Muslim men with Christian women focusing on converting masses to Islam through the familiar power of the father-figure back then. However, there was tension from the Pope and the Catholic Church to oppose Islamic rule in Spain and to "reclaim" Europe. This was the period of the so-called "Golden age of Jewish culture in Spain". The Almohads, who had taken control of the Almoravids' Maghrebi and Andalusian territories by 1147, far surpassed the Almoravids in Islamic fundamentalism, and they notably treated the non-Islamic dhimmis harshly. Faced with the choice of death, conversion, or emigration, many Jews fled to North Africa and Egypt.

The Reconquista was the long process by which the Catholics reconquered Spain from Islamic rule by 1492. The Spanish Inquisition was established in 1478 to complete the religious purification of the Iberian Peninsula. In the centuries that followed, Spain saw itself as the bulwark of Catholicism and doctrinal purity.

Spanish missionaries carried Catholicism to the Americas and the Philippines, establishing various missions in the newly colonized lands. The missions served as a base for both administering colonies as well as spreading Christianity.

According to Juan Avilés Farré, Catholicism constituted the "doctrinal basis of the most significant organizations of the anti-democratic and anti-liberal right-wing" in Spain developed in the period going from the demise of right-wing liberal conservatism led by Cánovas del Castillo to the installment of the Francoist dictatorship, including maurism, Patriotic Union, the group around Acción Española and Falange Española.

The Catholic Church in Spain supported Francisco Franco in the Spanish Civil War and afterwards established a close relationship with the Spanish state, with many Catholic priests serving in the government. After the Second Vatican Council, relations between Church and State started to deteriorate, especially during the reign of Pope Paul VI.

== Sites ==
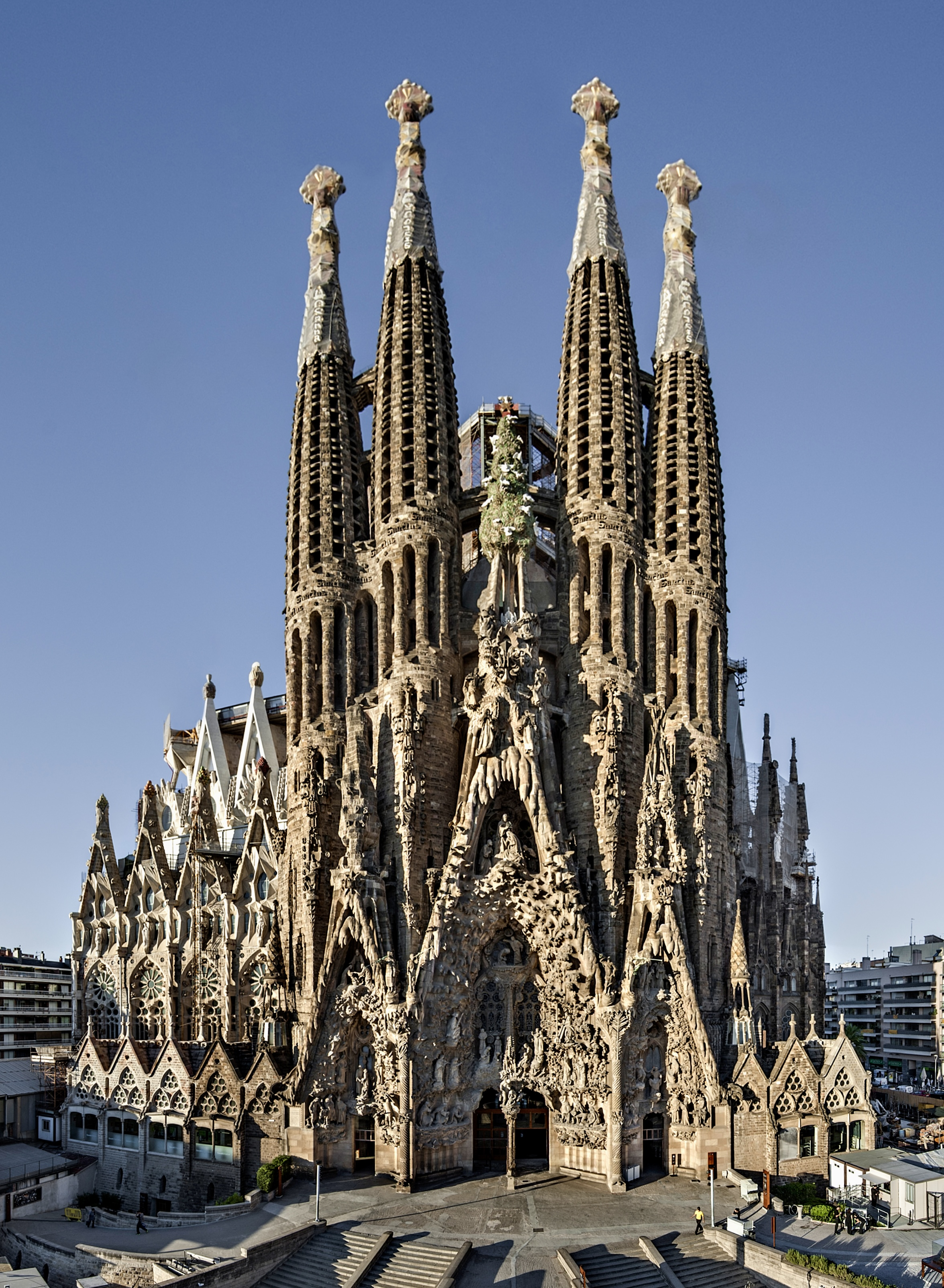
Sagrada Família in Barcelona

The Spanish Church oversees one of the most extensive repositories of religious architecture (and art) in the world, among them the cathedrals of Cordoba (originally built as a church and then replaced by a mosque during Moorish rule, to be subsequently reconsecrated as a Church), Santiago de Compostela, Burgos, León, Seville, Toledo and the Cathedral-Basilica of Our Lady of the Pillar in Zaragoza. Other Monasteries include San Millán and Silos in La Rioja, Monstserrat and Poblet in Catalonia, El Escorial and El Paular in Madrid, San Juan de los Reyes in Castile-La Mancha, the Abbey of Santa María la Real de Las Huelgas in Castile and Leon, or churches like Sagrada Família in Barcelona by Antoni Gaudí.

== Festivals and pilgrimages ==
=== Holy Week ===
Holy Week (Spanish: Semana Santa) in Spain attracts thousands of pilgrims and tourists alike. For centuries Holy Week has had a special significance in the church calendar in Spain, where early on Good Friday the darkened streets of dawn become the stage for solemn processions and celebrations that lead up to festivities of Easter Sunday. Fifty-eight processions (according to a 2008 guide) parallel the health and wealth of the city from the 16th and 17th centuries of its golden age to the French Invasion in the 18th century and finally to its rebirth today in the twentieth century. Despite church attendances falling, in common with the rest of Europe, the Easter processions are expanding, as many newly formed brotherhoods have asked for permission from bishops and other authorities to process during Holy Week.

=== Way of Saint James ===
For over a thousand years, Europeans living north of the Alps have made their way to the closest place in Europe "where they could access the spiritual authority of an Apostle: Santiago de Compostela". In 2007, for example, over 100,000 people walked to Santiago de Compostela alone.

== Statistics ==
There are over 42 million baptized, covering about 92% of the total population. There are 70 dioceses and archdioceses. Some studies indicate that the percentage of the population that identifies as Catholic is closer to 60%.

In spite of strong traditions, most Spaniards do not participate regularly in religious services. A study conducted in October 2006 by the Spanish Centre of Sociological Research shows that of the Spaniards who identify themselves as religious, 54% hardly ever or never go to church (except for wedding and funerals), 15% go to church some times a year, 10% some time per month and 19% every Sunday or multiple times per week. A huge majority of young Spaniards, including those who self-identify as Catholic, ignore the Church's stance on issues such as pre-marital sex, sexual orientation or contraception. 75% of Spanish Catholics support same-sex marriage and 13% oppose it. 91% of Spanish Catholics believe society should accept gay people while 8% believe society should not accept gays.

The total number of parish priests has shrunk from 24,300 in 1975 to 19,307 in 2005. Nuns also dropped 6.9% to 54,160 in the period 2000–2005.

According to the Eurobarometer 69 (2008), another independent source, only 3% of Spaniards consider religion as one of their three most important values, while the European mean is 7%.

In 2026, the Spanish Bishops' Conference published a doctrinal note about the "observed signs that indicate a rebirth of Christian faith especially among young Spaniards from Gen Z."

== See also ==
- Catholicism in the Second Spanish Republic
- Collective Letter of the Spanish Bishops, 1937
- Martyrs of the Spanish Civil War
- Religion in Spain
  - Eastern Orthodoxy in Spain
  - Protestantism in Spain
    - Anglicanism in Spain
- Saints of Catalonia
