= Villaescusa, Zamora =

Coordinates: 41°12′19″N 5°27′54″W

Villaescusa
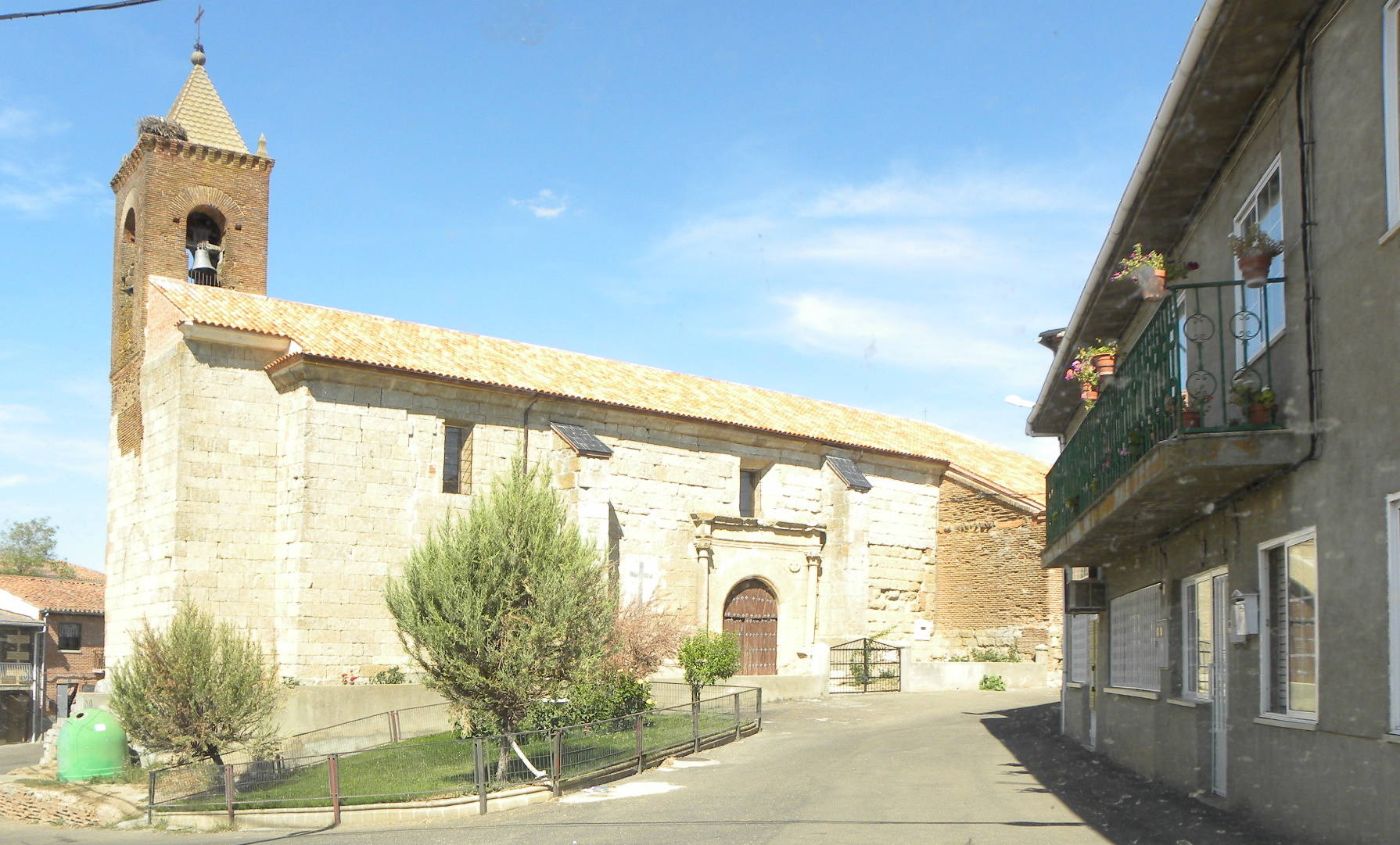

- Flag Coat of arms
- Interactive map of Villaescusa
- Country: Spain
- Autonomous community: Castile and León
- Province: Zamora
- Municipality: Villaescusa

Area
  - Total: 43.09 km^{2} (16.64 sq mi)

Population (2025-01-01)
  - Total: 237
  - Density: 5.50/km^{2} (14.2/sq mi)
- Time zone: UTC+1 (CET)
  - Summer (DST): UTC+2 (CEST)

Villaescusa is a Spanish municipality in the province of Zamora, Castile and León. It has a population of 352 (2004) and an area of 43,12 km².
