= Fuentesaúco =

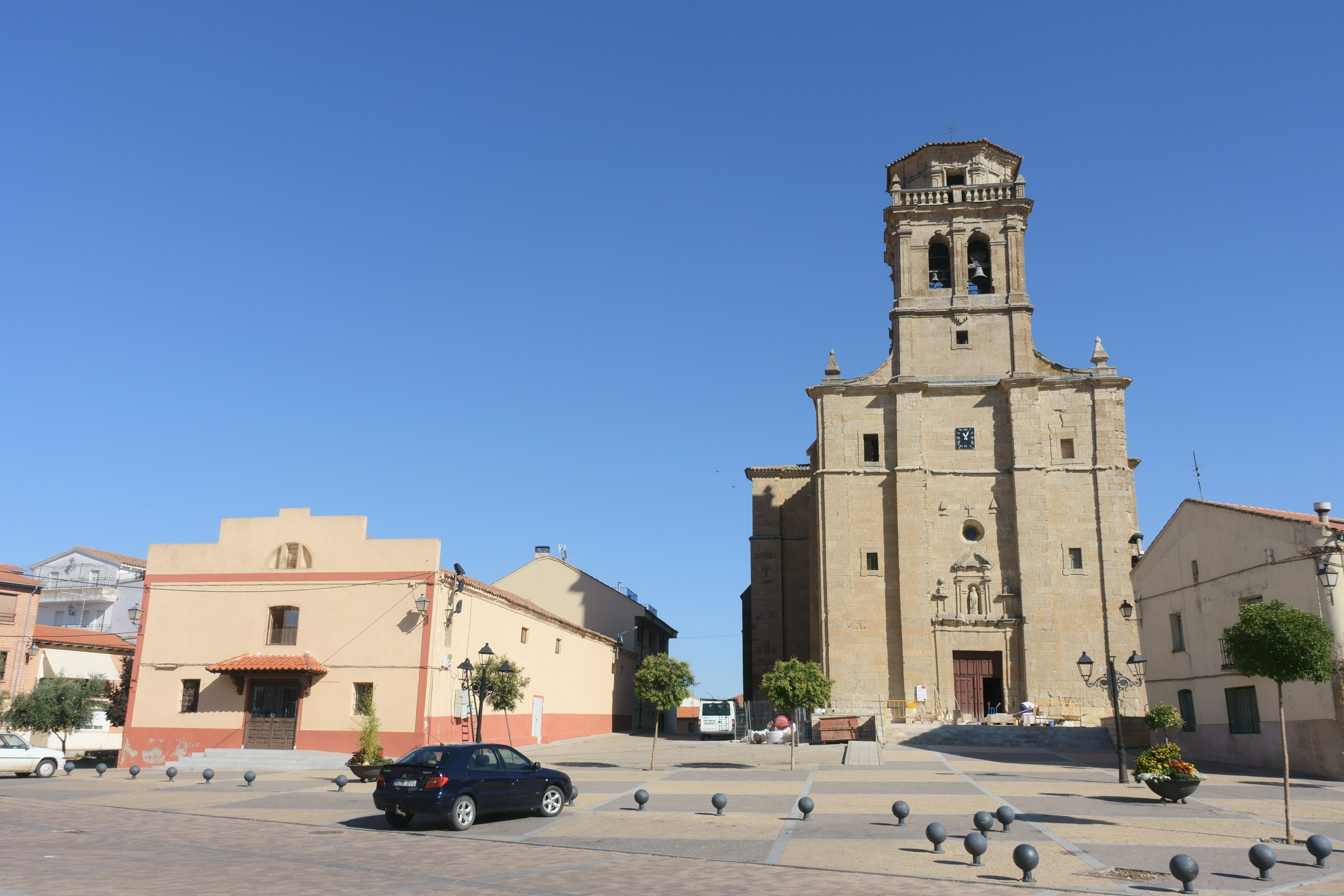

- Flag Coat of arms

- Location in Spain.
- Coordinates: 41°13′53″N 5°29′35″W
- Country: Spain
- Autonomous community: Castile and León
- Province: Zamora
- Comarca: La Guareña

Government
  - Mayor: Jaime Vega González

Area
  - Total: 67.85 km^{2} (26.20 sq mi)

Population (2025-01-01)
  - Total: 1,593
  - Density: 23.48/km^{2} (60.81/sq mi)
- Demonym: Saucanos
- Time zone: UTC+1 (CET)
  - Summer (DST): UTC+2 (CEST)
- Website: Official website

Fuentesaúco is a municipality located in the province of Zamora, Castile and León, Spain.
