= Protestantism in Spain =

This manta copies the original sambenitos of people sentenced by the Spanish Inquisition in Coruña del Conde, Burgos, Spain. It includes some Andrés Alonso, "reconciled" (returned to Catholicism) for Lutheranism in 1509.

Protestantism has had a small impact on Spanish life. In the first half of the 16th century, Reformist ideas failed to gain traction in Castile and Aragon. In the second half of the century, the Hispanic Monarchy and the Catholic Church managed to clear the territory from any remaining Protestant hotspot, most notably after the autos-da-fé in Valladolid (1559) and Seville (1560), from then on. 16th-century Inquisition blurred differences between Erasmism, iluminismo and Protestantism as if they belonged to a common branch.

Protestant groups have grown in the 20th and 21st centuries in the wake of immigration of Pentecostal Christians from Africa and the Americas. Many Romani people also converted to Pentecostalism in the last decades. Ninety-two percent of Spain's 8,131 villages do not have an Evangelical Protestant Church.

== Recent history ==
=== Francoist persecution ===
Upon the end of the Civil War, about 30 Protestant pastors reportedly fled from the country. The British and Foreign Bible Society's Madrid depository was raided by the police and their cache of Bible books was seized, whilst Protestant schools were closed.

During the Francoist dictatorship, religious liberties of the country's 30,000 protestants were curtailed (with the 1945 so-called Fuero de los Españoles or 'Spanish Bill of Rights') all but prohibiting any public activity or announcement, with Protestants also suffering from additional legal harassments and acts of violence deployed against their meeting places.

While the aforementioned bill granted freedom of private worship, non-Catholic religious services were forbidden in public, to the extent that they could not be held in buildings which had exterior signs indicating it was a house of worship. Furthermore, while already existing religious buildings were protected, Protestants were forbidden from creating new places of worship or move already existing ones.

Protestant marriages were not recognized but civilian ceremonies were available, at least when one of the grooms was not Catholic.

In order to bypass the ban on public activities, some Protestant groups constituted in trading companies associated to foreign countries, under the umbrella of the respective foreign embassies, rather than submitting to the Law of Public Associations.

In 1959, the World Evangelical Fellowship called Protestants across the world to pray for the Spanish Protestants.

Both the doctrinal changes introduced in the Second Vatican Council and the foreign diplomatic lobbying forced the Francoist regime to reform religious policy, and so the so-called 'Law of Religious Freedom' was promulgated in 1967. While short of introducing actual religious freedom, the law provided an image of modernization for the regime. Protestants expressed their disappointment towards the law.

=== Post-Francoist status ===
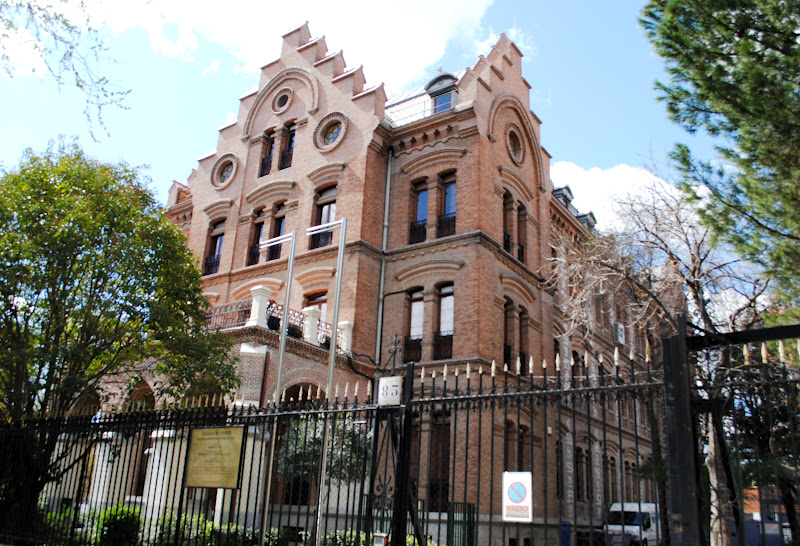
Iglesia de Cristo (Church of Christ) in Madrid, a church of the Spanish Evangelical Church.

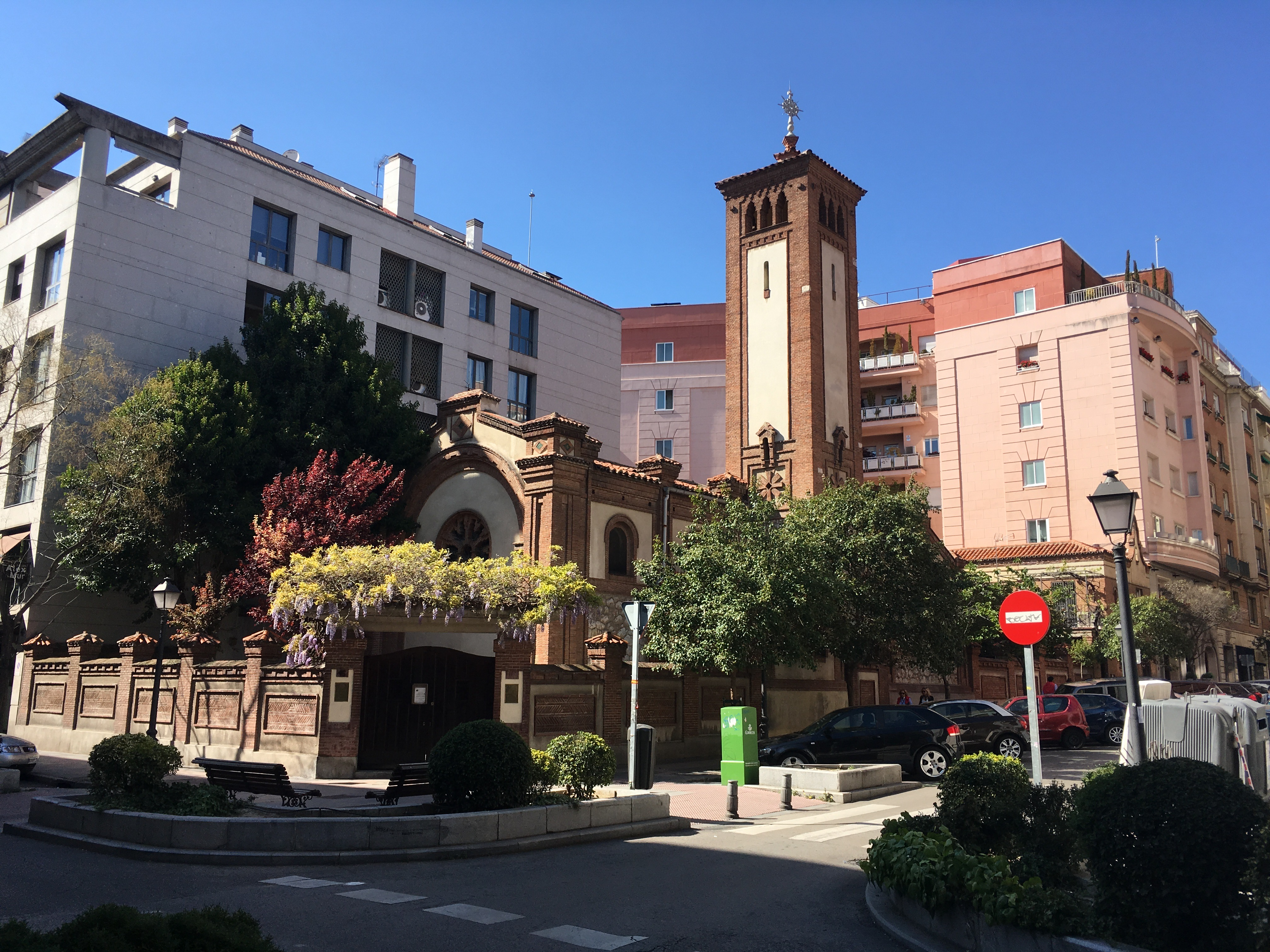
St George's Anglican Church, a Church of England church in Madrid.

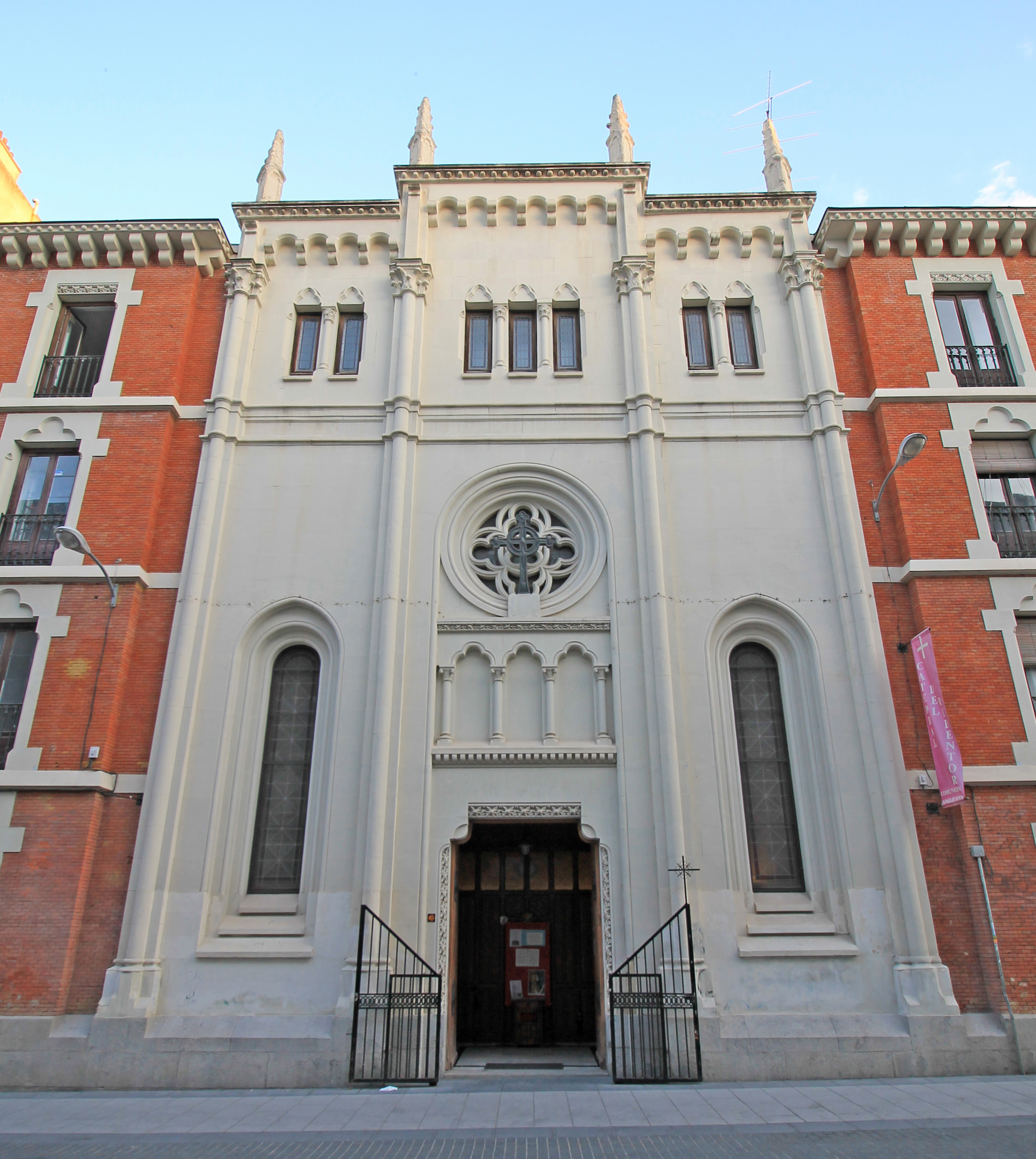
Anglican Cathedral of the Redeemer in Madrid, the cathedral of the Spanish Reformed Episcopal Church.

At present, the Spanish government observes the 1978 Constitution of Spain and the Law of Religious Freedom of 1980, thus guaranteeing many religious liberties to minorities. As of 2009, there reportedly were 1.5 million Protestants living in Spain.

In 2018, figures released by the national Observatory of Religious Pluralism show there were 4,238 evangelical and Pentecostal/Adventist places of worship in December 2018, a rise of 197 on the previous year. it was also reported that Spain's Pentecostals topped 4,000 congregations, Pentecostals also opened 16 churches every month.

Significant denominations and groups include:

- Spanish Evangelical Church
- Spanish Reformed Episcopal Church - an extra-provincial church of the Anglican Communion
- Baptist Evangelical Union of Spain
- Reformed Churches in Spain

There are also a number of accredited seminaries in the country. These include:

- The Bible Institute and Faculty of Theology of Spain (IBSTE) en Castelldefels, Barcelona.
- The United Evangelical Theological Seminary in Madrid (SEUT)
- The Protestant Faculty of Theology at Madrid (UEBE)
- The Assemblies of God Faculty of Theology in Barcelona

In the early 2020s, the People's Party of the Community of Madrid approached to Madrid-based milieus associated to ultra-conservative evangelical pastor Yadira Maestre, with the regional party branch likewise featuring an avowed goal of uniting "relations with the evangelical churches, around the project and the program of the PP".

== See also ==
- Christianity in Spain
  - Catholic Church in Spain
  - Eastern Orthodoxy in Spain
  - Anglicanism in Spain
  - Evangelical Presbyterian Church in Spain
  - Federation of Evangelical Religious Entities of Spain
- Conference of Protestant Churches in Latin Countries of Europe
