= Evangelical Presbyterian Church in Spain =

Evangelical Presbyterian Church of Spain
- Classification: Protestant
- Orientation: Confessional and conservative
- Theology: Calvinist
- Governance: Presbyterian
- Associations: Federation of Evangelical Religious Entities of Spain (FEREDE)
- Region: Spain
- Origin: 1989 (mission work); formally organized in 1999; Huelva, Spain
- Branched from: Presbyterian Church of Brazil
- Congregations: 12 (2021)
- Official website: iepe.org.es

The Evangelical Presbyterian Church of Spain (Spanish: Iglesia Evangélica Presbiteriana de España) is a confessional Reformed and Calvinist Protestant denomination in Spain. It originated from missionary work of the Presbyterian Church of Brazil and was formally organized in 1999. As of 2021, the denomination maintained congregations in several Spanish autonomous communities, including Andalusia, Galicia, Extremadura, the Community of Madrid, and Catalonia.

== History ==
The Evangelical Presbyterian Church of Spain began as a missionary initiative of the Presbyterian Mission Agency of Brazil (Agência Presbiteriana de Missões Transculturais) of the Presbyterian Church of Brazil. The first missionary work started in 1989 in the city of Huelva, led by Rev. Hugo Vivas. The church was legally organized as a denomination in 1999.

In 2005, a second congregation was planted in Seville by missionaries Everton and Nayra. In 2007, Carlos and Rosa Del Pino initiated the church in Torrelodones, later relocated to Collado-Villalba.

That same year, Ignacio Minchón became the first Spanish national pastor ordained within the denomination.

In 2008, missionaries Walter and Sueli founded the church in Getafe, while pastoral work in Madrid was initiated under the leadership of Pastor Fabio Diniz.

Subsequent church plants included A Coruña (2012), Málaga (2013), and the integration of the Churriana congregation in the same year. In 2017, Alejandro became the second Spanish national pastor ordained.

In 2018, the denomination founded the Presbyterian Institute of Theology to train church leaders.

By 2021, the Evangelical Presbyterian Church of Spain maintained congregations in cities such as Aguadulce, Barcelona, Don Benito, Getafe, Guillena, Huelva, A Coruña, Madrid, Málaga, Seville, and Torrelodones.

In 2022, Samuel Alonso was ordained to the ministry, and the congregation he and his wife Elessandra had founded in 2017 in Los Santos de Maimona was formally received into the denomination.

In 2024, new congregations were established in Alhaurín el Grande and Cáceres.

== Doctrine ==
As a Reformed church, the Evangelical Presbyterian Church of Spain adheres to Presbyterian polity and affirms the classic principles of the Protestant Reformation: Sola Scriptura, Sola Gratia, Sola Fide, Solus Christus, and Soli Deo Gloria.

The denomination is evangelical and affirms Biblical inerrancy, rejecting liberal theology. It subscribes to the Westminster Confession of Faith, the Westminster Shorter Catechism, and the Lausanne Covenant.

== Inter-church relations ==
The Evangelical Presbyterian Church of Spain maintains close ties with the Presbyterian Church of Brazil and its missionary agency, the Presbyterian Mission Agency of Brazil, which continue to support church planting efforts in Spain.

Since 2010, the denomination has maintained relations with the Reformed Churches of Spain, a member body of the International Conference of Reformed Churches, and since 2015 both churches have held joint synod meetings.

The church also maintains relations with the Presbyterian Church in Italy, another denomination founded through missionary efforts of the Presbyterian Church of Brazil.

== See also ==
- Protestantism in Spain
  - Federation of Evangelical Religious Entities of Spain
  - Reformed Churches in Spain
