= Sara González Lolo =

Spanish quad hockey player (born 1992)

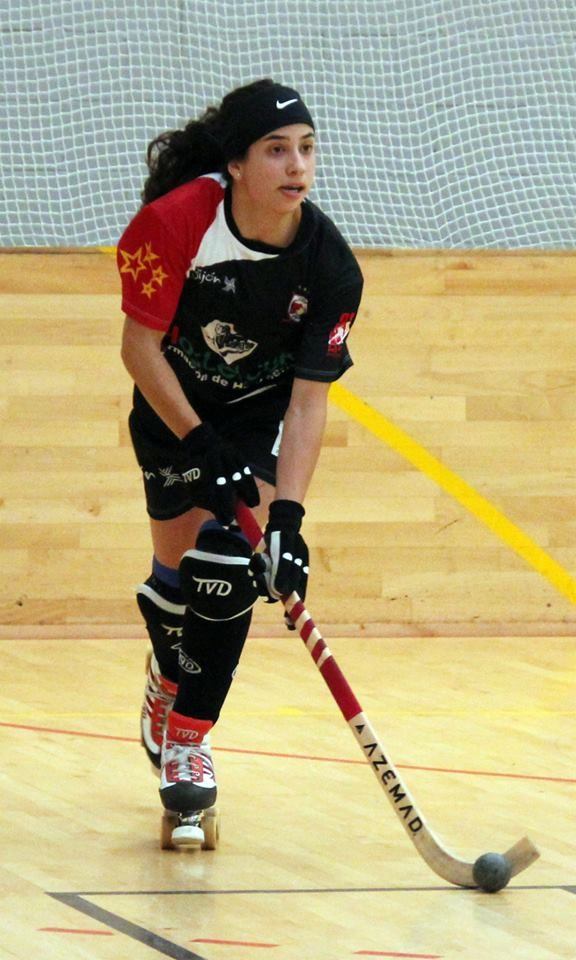

Personal information
- Nationality: Spain
- Born: 17 March 1992 (age 34) Gijón, Spain

Sport
- Sport: Hockey patines
- Position: Defense
- League: OK Liga
- Team: Gijón HC
Medal record
Representing Spain and Gijón HC
Gijón HC
Gold medal – first place	OK Liga	2009
Bronze medal – third place	Copa de la Reina	2009
Gold medal – first place	European League	2009
Silver medal – second place	OK Liga	2010
Gold medal – first place	European League	2010
Bronze medal – third place	Copa de la Reina	2011
Silver medal – second place	European League	2011
Gold medal – first place	Copa de la Reina	2012
Gold medal – first place	European League	2012
Bronze medal – third place	OK Liga	2013
Gold medal – first place	Copa de la Reina	2013
Bronze medal – third place	OK Liga	2014
Gold medal – first place	Copa de la Reina	2016
Bronze medal – third place	OK Liga	2016
Gold medal – first place	OK Liga	2017
Silver medal – second place	Copa de la Reina	2017
Silver medal – second place	European League	2017
Gold medal – first place	OK Liga	2018
Silver medal – second place	Copa de la Reina	2018
Gold medal – first place	European League	2018
International
Gold medal – first place	European U-19 Championship	2009
Gold medal – first place	European U-20 Championship	2010
Gold medal – first place	EuroCup	2011
Silver medal – second place	World Cup	2012
Gold medal – first place	EuroCup	2013
Gold medal – first place	EuroCup	2015
Gold medal – first place	World Cup	2016
Gold medal – first place	World Cup	2017
Gold medal – first place	EuroCup	2018

Sara González Lolo (born 17 March 1992) is a Spanish quad hockey player. She currently captains Club Patín Gijón Solimar.

== Playing career ==
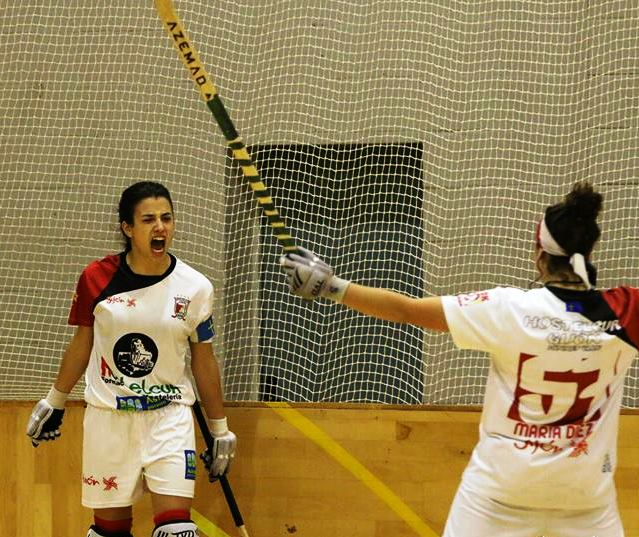
Lolo (left) celebrates a goal with a teammate.

Lolo began playing roller hockey in 2002 when she was 10 years old. Two years later, Lolo joined Club Patín Gijón Solimar, the club she still plays with today. Lolo was named captain of the team during the 2015-2016 season.

Lolo has also competed in numerous competitions with the Spanish national team.
