= WSE Women's European U-17 Roller Hockey Championship =

- Founded: 2013
- Region: Europe (WSE)
- Teams: 4
- Current champions: Spain (3rd title)
- Most championships: Spain (3 titles)
- Website: Official website
- 2026

The WSE Women's European U-17 Roller Hockey Championship is a competition between the female U-17 national teams in the Europe. It takes place every two years and it is organized by WSE. The first edition is not considered official. Its disputed by U-17 female players.

== Winners ==
Year	Ed	Host city	(gold) Gold	(silver) Silver	(bronze) Bronze
2026	4th	Braga, Portugal	Spain	Portugal	France
2025	3rd	Gujan-Mestras, France	Spain	Italy	France
2024	2nd	Olot, Spain	Spain	Portugal	France
2023	1st	Correggio, Italy	Portugal	England	Italy
2014	*–	Darmstadt, Germany			
2013	*–	Wuppertal, Germany	France	Germany 1	Germany 2

* Non official editions

=== Medal table ===
Rank	Nation	Gold	Silver	Bronze	Total
1	Spain	3	0	0	3
2	Portugal	1	2	0	3
3	Italy	0	1	1	2
4	England	0	1	0	1
5	France	0	0	3	3
Totals (5 entries)		4	4	4	12

== See also ==
- U17 Female Tournament
