= Women's Roller Hockey World Cup =

International roller hockey tournament

- Current season, competition or edition: 2026 Women's Roller Hockey World Cup
- Sport: Roller hockey
- Founded: 1992; 34 years ago
- First season: 1992
- No. of teams: 8
- Continent: International (WS)
- Most recent champion: Spain (9th title)
- Most titles: Spain (9 titles)

The Women's Roller Hockey World Cup is a competition between the best female national teams in the World. It takes place every two years and it was organized by the FIRS until its integration into World Skate.

== History ==
Roller Hockey has a Women's Championship which has taken place every two years since 1992 until 2017, when the FIRS agreed to integrate the championship into the World Roller Games. It is now organized by the World Skate.

The first edition, played in 1992, was played with the traditional quads except for the Canadian team, who wore inline skates.

Due to the 2022 Russian invasion of Ukraine, World Skate banned Russian and Belarusian athletes and officials from its competitions, and will not stage any events in Russia or Belarus in 2022.

== Summary ==
#	Year	Host city	Winner	Score	Runners-up	Third place	Score	Fourth place	Teams
1	1992; Details	(Germany) Springe	Canada	League	Italy	New Zealand	League	Netherlands	12
2	1994; Details	(Portugal) Tavira	Spain	5–3	Canada	Japan	5–4	Portugal	19
3	1996; Details	(Brazil) Sertãozinho	Spain	3–2	Italy	Portugal	2–0	Brazil	11
4	1998; Details	(Argentina) Buenos Aires	Argentina	3–1	Portugal	Germany	2–1	Brazil	14
5	2000; Details	(Germany) Marl	Spain	2–0	Portugal	Argentina	2–0	Germany	15
6	2002; Details	(Portugal) Paços de Ferreira	Argentina	4–1	Brazil	Spain	2–1	Portugal	16
7	2004; Details	(Germany) Wuppertal	Argentina	3–1	Brazil	Spain	4–3	Portugal	15
8	2006; Details	(Chile) Santiago	Chile	1–1 (a.e.t.); 2–1 (p)	Spain	Argentina	3–1	Portugal	16
9	2008; Details	(Japan) Yurihonjō	Spain	3–1	Portugal	Argentina	8–1	United States	12
10	2010; Details	(Spain) Alcobendas	Argentina	5–1	France	Spain	3–0	Germany	16
11	2012; Details	(Brazil) Recife	France	3–2	Spain	Colombia	1–0	Portugal	14
12	2014; Details	(France) Tourcoing	Argentina	3–0	France	Chile	2–0	Germany	14
13	2016; Details	(Chile) Iquique	Spain	3–2 (a.s.d.e.t.)	Portugal	Argentina	4–0	France	13
14	2017; Details	(China) Nanjing	Spain	7–5 (a.e.t.)	Argentina	Germany	3–0	Chile	11
15	2019; Details	(Spain) Barcelona	Spain	8–5	Argentina	Chile	3–0	Italy	14
16	2022; Details	(Argentina) San Juan	Argentina	3–0	Spain	Portugal	3–0	Italy	8
17	2024; Details	(Italy) Novara	Spain	2–0	Portugal	Argentina	9–0	Italy	8
18	2026; Details	(Paraguay) Asunción	Spain	3–1	Argentina	Italy	3–2	Portugal	11

== Medal table ==
Rank	Nation	Gold	Silver	Bronze	Total
1	Spain	9	3	3	15
2	Argentina	6	3	5	14
3	France	1	2	0	3
4	Canada	1	1	0	2
5	Chile	1	0	2	3
6	Portugal	0	5	2	7
7	Italy	0	2	1	3
8	Brazil	0	2	0	2
9	Germany	0	0	2	2
10	Colombia	0	0	1	1
10	Japan	0	0	1	1
10	New Zealand	0	0	1	1
Totals (12 entries)		18	18	18	54

== Intercontinental Championships ==
The Intercontinental Championships serve as the B division of the World Roller Hockey Championships, providing a competitive platform for emerging national teams. Held under the organisation of World Skate, the tournament allows developing roller hockey nations to compete internationally and gain experience at a high level. The top 2 teams from the championship earn a spot for the winning team from their region to move up a division into the World Championship for the following tournament.

Year	Host city	(gold) Gold	(silver) Silver	(bronze) Bronze	4th Place
2024	(Italy) Novara	Germany	Australia	Brazil	Netherlands
2022	(Argentina) San Juan	Switzerland	Brazil	Australia	Mexico

== See also ==
- Roller Hockey World Cup
- Roller Hockey World Cup U-20
- U17 Female Club Tournament
