= 2017 Women's Roller Hockey World Cup =

2017 FIRS Women's Roller Hockey World Cup
Tournament details
- Host country: China
- City: Nanjing
- Dates: 27 August–2 September 2017
- Teams: 8 (from 3 confederations)
- Venue: 1 (in 1 host city)

Final positions
- Champions: Spain (6th title)
- Runners-up: Argentina
- Third place: Germany
- Fourth place: Chile

Tournament statistics
- Top scorer(s): (Portugal) Marlene Sousa (9 goals)

The 2017 FIRS Women's Roller Hockey World Cup was the 14th edition of the Women's Roller Hockey World Cup, organised by the Fédération Internationale de Roller Sports (FIRS). The tournament was held for the first time in China, in the city of Nanjing, from 27 August to 2 September 2017, as part of the 2017 World Roller Games.

Spain won its sixth title, retaining the title they conquered one year before.

== Competition format ==
During the previous edition of the World Cup, the FIRS determined to end with the celebration of two different tournaments for divisions A and B, and merged all competitions in a whole event integrated in the World Roller Games. Despite this merge, teams were divided into two different competitions.

For this tournament there would not be golden goals during the overtimes.

=== World Championship ===
The eight first ranked teams were divided into two groups. All teams would qualify for the quarterfinals.

=== FIRS Cup ===
The three remaining teams would a double round-robin tournament for determining the final positions.

== Teams ==
The 12 participating teams were divided into three competitions according to their positions in the 2016 FIRS Women's Roller Hockey World Cup. The Division B was renamed as FIRS Cup.

The two top seeded teams were drawn in different groups. The draw was held in Barcelona on 5 July 2017.

World Championship		FIRS Cup	
Rank	Team	Rank	Team
1	Spain	9	India
2	Portugal	10	Egypt
3	Argentina	11	England
4	France	12	Japan
5	Chile		
6	Colombia		
7	Italy		
8	Germany		

== World Championship ==
=== Group A ===
Pos	Team	Pld	W	D	L	GF	GA	GD	Pts	Qualification	Spain women's national roller hockey team	Germany women's national roller hockey team	France women's national roller hockey team	United States women's national roller hockey team
1	Spain	3	3	0	0	25	1	+24	9	Qualification to quarterfinals	—	—	10–1	8–0
2	Germany	3	1	1	1	30	10	+20	4	Qualification to quarterfinals	0–7	—	—	27–0
3	France	3	1	1	1	31	13	+18	4	Qualification to quarterfinals	—	3–3	—	—
4	United States	3	0	0	3	0	62	−62	0	Qualification to quarterfinals	—	—	0–27	—

Source: FIRS

=== Group B ===
Pos	Team	Pld	W	D	L	GF	GA	GD	Pts	Qualification	Argentina women's national roller hockey team	Chile women's national roller hockey team	Italy women's national roller hockey team	Portugal women's national roller hockey team
1	Argentina	3	3	0	0	10	2	+8	9	Qualification to quarterfinals	—	1–0	2–0	—
2	Chile	3	1	1	1	4	4	0	4	Qualification to quarterfinals	—	—	—	2–2
3	Italy	3	1	0	2	6	10	−4	3	Qualification to quarterfinals	—	1–2	—	—
4	Portugal	3	0	1	2	6	10	−4	1	Qualification to quarterfinals	2–5	—	2–3	—

Source: FIRS

=== Knockout stage ===
Quarterfinals
30 August
Argentina	10
United States	0
30 August
Germany	3
Italy	0
30 August
Spain	4
Portugal	1
30 August
Chile	3
France	0

Semifinals
31 August
Argentina	6
Germany	1
31 August
Spain (p)	2 (2)
Chile	2 (1)

Final
2 September
Argentina	5
Spain (a.e.t.)	7
Third place
1 September
Germany	3
Chile	0

Source: FIRS

==== Quarterfinals ====
30 August 2017; 8:30
30 August 2017; 8:30	Chile	3–0	France	Longjiang Gymnasium, Nanjing
30 August 2017; 8:30	Ramos 32' (pen.), 44'; Donoso 45'	Report		Longjiang Gymnasium, Nanjing
	Umpires: Rui Torres (Portugal), Joseph Silecchia (Italy)

30 August 2017; 12:30
30 August 2017; 12:30	Argentina	10–0	United States	Longjiang Gymnasium, Nanjing
30 August 2017; 12:30	Gutiérrez 1', 12'; A. Fernández 4', 8', 11', 13'; Ma. Rodríguez 8' (pen.); Silva 11', 17'; J. Fernández 36'	Report		Longjiang Gymnasium, Nanjing
	Umpires: Giovanni Grisales (Colombia), Isidro Martínez (Chile)

30 August 2017; 16:30
30 August 2017; 16:30	Germany	3–0	Italy	Longjiang Gymnasium, Nanjing
30 August 2017; 16:30	Henkels 21'; Wichardt 39'; La Rocca 42'	Report		Longjiang Gymnasium, Nanjing
	Umpires: Joaquim Pinto, Paulo Rainha (Portugal)

30 August 2017; 18:30
30 August 2017; 18:30	Spain	4–1	Portugal	Longjiang Gymnasium, Nanjing
30 August 2017; 18:30	Diez 5', 33'; Casarramona 15'; Lee 40'	Report	Sousa 28'	Longjiang Gymnasium, Nanjing
	Umpires: Daniel Costa, Carlos Fernández (Argentina)

==== Semifinals ====
31 August 2017; 14:30
31 August 2017; 14:30	Argentina	6–1	Germany	Longjiang Gymnasium, Nanjing
31 August 2017; 14:30	Agudo 7', 16'; Gutiérrez 22'; Silva 28'; V. Fernández 36'; J. Fernández 48'	Report	Wichardt 45'	Longjiang Gymnasium, Nanjing
	Umpires: Rui Torres (Portugal), Joseph Silecchia (Italy)

31 August 2017; 16:30
31 August 2017; 16:30	Spain	2–2 (a.e.t.) (2–1 p)	Chile	Longjiang Gymnasium, Nanjing
31 August 2017; 16:30	Casarramona 44'; Lee 55'; Diez (penalty shoot-out scored); S. González (penalty shoot-out scored); Busquets (penalty shoot-out missed); Casarramona (penalty shoot-out missed); Lee (penalty shoot-out missed)	Report	Ramos 18', 58' (penalty shoot-out missed) Gaete; (penalty shoot-out scored) Ramos; (penalty shoot-out missed) Puertas; (penalty shoot-out missed) Donoso; (penalty shoot-out missed) Flores	Longjiang Gymnasium, Nanjing
	Umpires: Sergio Insúa, Carlos Fernández (Argentina)

==== Third place match ====
1 September 2017; 14:30
1 September 2017; 14:30	Germany	3–0	Chile	Longjiang Gymnasium, Nanjing
1 September 2017; 14:30	K. Neubert 23', 44'; F. Neubert 32'	Report		Longjiang Gymnasium, Nanjing
	Umpires: Rui Torres (Portugal), Joseph Silecchia (Italy)

==== Final ====
2 September 2017; 16:00
2 September 2017; 16:00	Argentina	5–7 (a.e.t.)	Spain	Longjiang Gymnasium, Nanjing
2 September 2017; 16:00	V. Fernández 4'; Silva 17'; J. Fernández 19'; Gutiérrez 31', 53'	Report	Lee 5'; Busquets 15', 56'; Puigdueta 18', 38'; Casarramona 53'; Diez 59'	Longjiang Gymnasium, Nanjing
	Umpires: Paulo Rainha, Joaquim Pinto

=== 5th to 8th position bracket ===
Semifinals
31 August
United States	1
Italy	13
31 August
Portugal	1
France	3

5th position game
1 September
Italy	3
France	4
7th position game
1 September
United States	0
Portugal	26

== FIRS Cup ==
After the withdrawal of Egypt, the competition system changed for playing each team three teams against each other.

Pos	Team	Pld	W	D	L	GF	GA	GD	Pts	England women's national roller hockey team	India women's national roller hockey team	Japan women's national roller hockey team
1	England	6	5	1	0	35	11	+24	16	—	6–1	6–1, 7–1
2	India	6	3	1	2	21	22	−1	10	3–6, 5–5	—	5–2
3	Japan	6	0	0	6	7	30	−23	0	0–5	2–4, 1–3	—

Source: FIRS

== Final standings ==
Pos.	Team	G	Pld	W	D	L	Pts	GF	GA	GD
1	Spain	A	6	5	1	0	16	38	9	+29
2	Argentina	B	6	5	0	1	15	31	10	+21
3	Germany	A	6	3	1	2	10	37	16	+21
4	Chile	B	6	2	2	2	8	9	9	0
Eliminated in the quarter-finals
5	France	A	6	3	1	2	10	38	20	+18
6	Italy	B	6	2	0	4	6	22	17	+5
7	Portugal	B	6	1	1	4	4	34	17	+17
8	United States	A	6	0	0	6	0	1	111	−110
Played the FIRS Cup
9	England	—	6	5	1	0	16	35	11	+24
10	India	—	6	3	1	2	10	21	22	−1
11	Japan	—	6	0	0	6	0	7	30	−23
