= 2019 Women's Roller Hockey World Cup =

Tournament details
- Host country: Spain
- City: Barcelona
- Dates: 7–14 July 2019
- Teams: 14 (from 4 confederations)
- Venue: 4 (in 4 host cities)

Final positions
- Champions: Spain (7th title)
- Runners-up: Argentina
- Third place: Chile
- Fourth place: Italy

The 2019 Women's Roller Hockey World Cup will be the 15th edition of the Women's Roller Hockey World Cup, organised by World Skate. The tournament will be held in Spain, in the city of Barcelona, as part of the 2019 World Roller Games.

== Competition format ==
Eight teams composed the World Championship (first tier) and six the Intercontinental Cup (second tier).

Teams were divided into groups of four teams for composing the group stage in the World Championship, while the Intercontinental Cup was played in a round-robin format.

== World Championship ==
=== Qualified teams ===
On 12 March 2019, teams were announced.

- Argentina
- Chile
- France
- Germany
- Italy
- Portugal
- Spain
- Switzerland

=== Group stage ===
==== Group A ====
Pos	Team	Pld	W	D	L	GF	GA	GD	Pts	Qualification	(Spain)	(Chile)	(France)	(Switzerland)
1	Spain	3	3	0	0	19	2	+17	9	Quarterfinals	—	—	—	9–0
2	Chile	3	2	0	1	9	6	+3	6	Quarterfinals	2–3	—	—	3–1
3	France	3	1	0	2	4	12	−8	3	Quarterfinals	0–7	2–4	—	—
4	Switzerland	3	0	0	3	2	14	−12	0	Quarterfinals	—	—	1–2	—

Source: World Roller Games

==== Group B ====
Pos	Team	Pld	W	D	L	GF	GA	GD	Pts	Qualification	(Argentina)	(Italy)	(Portugal)	(Germany)
1	Argentina	3	3	0	0	17	4	+13	9	Quarterfinals	—	—	—	5–2
2	Italy	3	2	0	1	5	11	−6	6	Quarterfinals	1–9	—	3–2	—
3	Portugal	3	1	0	2	5	7	−2	3	Quarterfinals	1–3	—	—	2–1
4	Germany	3	0	0	3	3	8	−5	0	Quarterfinals	—	0–1	—	—

Source: World Roller Games

=== Knockout stage ===
Quarter-finals
11 July
Italy (a.e.t.)	4
France	3
11 July
Germany	0
Spain	7
11 July
Argentina	11
Switzerland	0
11 July
Portugal	1
Chile	4

Semi-finals
12 July
Italy	2
Spain (a.e.t.)	4
12 July
Argentina (p)	2 (2)
Chile	2 (1)

Final
14 July
Spain	8
Argentina	5
Third place
14 July
Italy	0
Chile	3

==== Fifth to eight position ====
Semi-finals
12 July
Germany	3
France	2
12 July
Switzerland	0
Portugal	5

Fifth position game
13 July
Germany	3
Portugal	7
Seventh position game
13 July
France	1
Switzerland	0

== Intercontinental Cup ==
=== Group stage ===
Pos	Team	Pld	W	D	L	GF	GA	GD	Pts	(Colombia)	(England)	(Japan)	(United States)	(India)	(China)
1	Colombia	5	5	0	0	67	4	+63	15	—	—	—	22–0	13–1	23–0
2	England	5	4	0	1	73	8	+65	12	3–4	—	—	21–1	—	—
3	Japan	5	3	0	2	55	10	+45	9	0–5	1–3	—	—	9–1	—
4	United States	5	2	0	3	51	53	−2	6	—	—	1–5	—	6–5	—
5	India	5	1	0	4	37	37	0	3	—	2–9	—	—	—	28–0
6	China	5	0	0	5	0	171	−171	0	—	0–37	0–40	0–43	—	—

Source: World Roller Games

== Final standings ==
Pos.	Team	G	Pld	W	D	L	Pts	GF	GA	GD
1	Spain	A	6	6	0	0	18	38	9	+29
2	Argentina	B	6	4	1	1	13	35	14	+21
3	Chile	A	6	4	1	1	13	18	9	+9
4	Italy	B	6	3	0	3	9	11	21	−10
5	Portugal	B	6	3	0	3	9	18	14	+4
6	Germany	B	6	1	0	5	3	9	24	−15
7	France	A	6	2	0	4	6	10	19	−9
8	Switzerland	A	6	0	0	6	0	2	30	−28
Played the Intercontinental Cup
9	Colombia	—	5	5	0	0	15	67	4	+63
10	England	—	5	4	0	1	12	73	8	+65
11	Japan	—	5	3	0	2	9	55	10	+45
12	United States	—	5	2	0	3	6	51	53	−2
13	India	—	5	1	0	4	3	37	37	0
14	China	—	5	0	0	5	0	0	171	−171
