= CERH European Women's Roller Hockey Junior Championship =

- Founded: 1991
- Region: Europe (CERH)
- Number of teams: 5
- Current champions: Spain (5th title)
- Most successful team(s): Spain (5 titles)
- Website: http://www.cerh.eu/main.php
- 2010

The CERH European Women's Roller Hockey Junior Championship is a competition between the female junior national teams in Europe. It takes place every two years and it is organized by CERH. The first two editions are not considered official. Until 2009 the teams were all composed by under-19 players, but since 2010 it has been disputed by U-20 players.

The edition that should have been disputed in 2012 was cancelled due to lack of minimum participating teams.

== Winners ==
=== Ladies Championship ===
Year	Ed	Host city	(gold) Gold	(silver) Silver	(bronze) Bronze
2010	4th	Darmstadt, Germany	Spain	Germany	England
2009	3rd	Mealhada, Portugal	Spain	Portugal	England
2008	2nd	Cestas, Spain	Spain	France	Germany
2007	1st	Luso, Portugal	Spain	Portugal	Germany
2005	0.2*	Gijón, Spain	Spain	Portugal	Italy
2001	0.1*	Hamm, Germany	Germany	Portugal	France

* Non official editions

=== Medal table ===
Rank	Nation	Gold	Silver	Bronze	Total
1	Spain	5	0	0	5
2	Germany	1	1	2	4
3	Portugal	0	4	0	4
4	France	0	1	1	2
5	England	0	0	2	2
6	Italy	0	0	1	1
Totals (6 entries)		6	6	6	18

== See also ==
- U17 Female Tournament
