= 1992 Women's Roller Hockey World Cup =

Roller Hockey Women's World Championships

Tournament details
- Host country: Germany
- Teams: 12 (from 5 confederations)
- Venue(s): 1 (in 1 host city)

Final positions
- Champions: Canada (1st title)
- Runners-up: Italy
- Third place: New Zealand
- Fourth place: Netherlands

Tournament statistics
- Matches played: 66
- Goals scored: 528 (8 per match)

The 1992 Women's Roller Hockey World Cup was the first ever roller hockey world cup for women, organized by the Fédération Internationale de Roller Sports. It was contested by 12 national teams (6 from Europe, 2 from North America, 2 from Oceania, 1 from Africa and 1 from Asia). The chosen city to host the world cup was Springe, in Germany. This inaugural edition was won by Canada's squad, with eleven victories in eleven matches.

The tournament was played with the traditional quads except for the Canadian team, who wore inline skates.

== Results ==
Team	IND	RSA	ENG	USA	GER	ESP	POR	AUS	NED	NZL	ITA	CAN
India												
South Africa	4–2											
England	10–0	4–1										
United States	22–0	6–1	4–0									
Germany	20–1	7–0	5–0	3–2								
Spain	18–0	8–0	9–2	4–1	2–2							
Portugal	14–0	12–0	6–2	3–1	3–2	2–1						
Australia	19–0	9–1	5–2	2–3	3–2	4–3	4–3					
Netherlands	24–0	4–0	10–3	7–1	3–2	2–2	2–1	3–1				
New Zealand	24–0	3–0	8–3	4–0	2–0	1–1	3–1	4–2	1–0			
Italy	25–0	10–0	8–1	3–1	2–0	3–1	2–0	4–0	0–0	2–1		
Canada	15–1	11–0	17–1	9–0	6–0	5–2	8–1	5–2	6–1	2–0	6–1	

== Standings ==
Team	Pld	W	D	L	GF	GA	GD	Pts
(gold) Canada (C)	11	11	0	0	112	11	+101	22
(silver) Italy	11	9	0	2	75	18	+57	18
(bronze) New Zealand	11	7	2	2	45	15	+30	16
Netherlands	11	8	0	3	69	24	+45	16
Australia	11	6	2	3	37	22	+15	14
Portugal	11	7	0	4	57	39	+18	14
Spain	11	5	0	6	43	52	−9	10
Germany	11	3	2	6	40	63	−23	8
United States	11	3	1	7	35	53	−18	7
England	11	2	0	9	26	89	−63	4
South Africa	11	1	1	9	18	91	−73	3
India	11	0	0	11	11	91	−80	0

(C) 1992 World Champion

== See also ==
- FIRS Women's Roller Hockey World Cup
