= 2014 FIRS Women's Roller Hockey World Cup =

Tourcoing 2014

Tournament details
- Host country: France
- Dates: 25 October – 1 November
- Teams: 14
- Venue(s): 1 (in 1 host city)

Final positions
- Champions: Argentina (5th title)
- Runners-up: France
- Third place: Chile
- Fourth place: Germany

Tournament statistics
- Matches played: 43
- Goals scored: 334 (7.77 per match)

The 2014 FIRS Women's Roller Hockey World Cup, also known as Tourcoing 2014, was the 12th edition of the women's roller hockey world cup. It was held in Tourcoing, France from October 25 to November 1, 2014, and was contested by fourteen teams. Argentina defeated France in the final to win the World Cup.

== Group stage ==
=== Group A ===
Pos	Team	Pld	W	D	L	GF	GA	GD	Pts
1	France	2	2	0	0	21	0	+21	6
2	Switzerland	2	1	0	1	9	5	+4	3
3	United States	2	0	0	2	2	27	−25	0

26 Oct 2014 18:00	France	18–0	United States
27 Oct 2014 16:30	Switzerland	9–2	United States
28 Oct 2014 19:30	France	3–0	Switzerland

=== Group B ===
Pos	Team	Pld	W	D	L	GF	GA	GD	Pts
1	Argentina	2	2	0	0	16	1	+15	6
2	Spain	2	1	0	1	11	7	+4	3
3	Japan	2	0	0	2	0	19	−19	0

26 Oct 2014 15:00	Spain	10–0	Japan
27 Oct 2014 21:00	Argentina	7–1	Spain
28 Oct 2014 16:30	Japan	0–9	Argentina

=== Group C ===
Pos	Team	Pld	W	D	L	GF	GA	GD	Pts
1	Chile	3	3	0	0	22	1	+21	9
2	Colombia	3	2	0	1	9	3	+6	6
3	England	3	1	0	2	5	14	−9	3
4	South Africa	3	0	0	3	1	19	−18	0

26 Oct 2014 12:00	England	5–1	South Africa
26 Oct 2014 21:00	Colombia	1–3	Chile
27 Oct 2014 15:00	Colombia	7–0	South Africa
27 Oct 2014 18:00	England	0–12	Chile
28 Oct 2014 15:00	South Africa	0–7	Chile
28 Oct 2014 18:00	England	0–1	Colombia

=== Group D ===
Pos	Team	Pld	W	D	L	GF	GA	GD	Pts
1	Germany	3	3	0	0	18	5	+13	9
2	Italy	3	2	0	1	29	5	+24	6
3	Portugal	3	1	0	2	26	6	+20	3
4	India	3	0	0	3	1	58	−57	0

26 Oct 2014 13:30	Portugal	24–0	India
26 Oct 2014 19:30	Germany	4–3	Italy
27 Oct 2014 13:30	Germany	11–1	India
27 Oct 2014 19:30	Italy	3–1	Portugal
28 Oct 2014 13:30	India	0–23	Italy
28 Oct 2014 21:00	Portugal	1–3	Germany

== Play-off stages ==
Round of 16
29 Oct 2014 13:30
Argentina	8
South Africa	0
29 Oct 2014 15:00
Italy	14
United States	0
29 Oct 2014 16:30
England	0
Switzerland	4
Germany
29 Oct 2014 18:00
Colombia	3
Japan	2
29 Oct 2014 19:30
India	0
France	15
29 Oct 2014 21:00
Portugal	3
Spain	1
Chile

Quarter-finals
30 Oct 2014 16:30
Argentina	4
Italy	0
30 Oct 2014 18:00
Switzerland	0
Germany	4
30 Oct 2014 19:30
France	4
Colombia	0
30 Oct 2014 21:00
Portugal	3
Chile	4

Semi-finals
31 Oct 2014 21:00
Argentina	3
Germany	0
31 Oct 2014 19:30
France	3
Chile	2

Final
1 Nov 2014 21:00
France	0
Argentina	3
Third place
1 Nov 2014 19:30
Germany	0
Chile	2

=== 5th–8th playoff ===
Semi-finals
31 Oct 2014 16:30
Italy	4
Switzerland	1
31 Oct 2014 18:00
Colombia	2
Portugal	7

Fifth place
1 Nov 2014 18:00
Portugal	2
Italy	1
Seventh place
1 Nov 2014 16:30
Switzerland	2
Colombia	1

=== 9th–14th playoff ===
Quarter-finals
30 Oct 2014 13:30
India	4
Japan	3
Spain
30 Oct 2014 15:00
United States	5
South Africa	1
England

Semi finals
31 Oct 2014 13:30
India	0
Spain	14
31 Oct 2014 15:00
United States	1
England	9

Ninth place
1 Nov 2014 15:00
Spain	6
England	0
Eleventh place
1 Nov 2014 13:30
India	6
United States	4

=== 13th–14th playoff ===
Final
1 Nov 2014 12:00
South Africa	5
Japan	4

2014 FIRS Women's Roller Hockey World Cup champion

Argentina
Fifth title

== Final ranking ==
Rank	Team
Gold medal	Argentina
Silver medal	France
Bronze medal	Chile
4	Germany
5	Portugal
6	Italy
7	Switzerland
8	Colombia
9	Spain
10	England
11	India
12	United States
13	South Africa
14	Japan

== See also ==
- FIRS Women's Roller Hockey World Cup
