= 2018 Rink Hockey Female European Championship =

2018 Female European Championship
Tournament details
- Host country: Portugal
- Dates: 8–14 October
- Teams: 7
- Venue(s): 1 (in 1 host city)

Final positions
- Champions: Spain (6th title)
- Runners-up: Portugal
- Third place: Italy
- Fourth place: France

Tournament statistics
- Matches played: 21
- Goals scored: 189 (9 per match)

The 2018 Rink Hockey Female European Championship was the 14th edition of this tournament, held between 8 and 14 October 2018 in Mealhada, Portugal. The competition was contested by seven teams under a round-robin format.

== Controversies ==
The final match between Portugal and Spain was suspended with less than two minutes left, due to the effects of Ex-Hurricane Leslie. Spain was winning by 3–2. As such, the assignation of the champion was suspended.

Finally, the last two minutes were played on 1 November 2018 and Spain achieved the title with one more goal, finally winning by 4–2.

== League table ==
Pos	Team	Pld	W	D	L	GF	GA	GD	Pts	Medal	(Spain)	(Portugal)	(Italy)	(France)	(Germany)	(Switzerland)	(England)
1	Spain	6	6	0	0	59	6	+53	18	Gold medal	—	4–2	—	6–1	10–2	12–0	—
2	Portugal	6	5	0	1	40	9	+31	15	Silver medal	—	—	5–0	—	4–1	—	—
3	Italy	6	3	1	2	17	18	−1	10	Bronze medal	1–7	—	—	3–2	3–3	—	—
4	France	6	3	0	3	29	26	+3	9		—	2–8	—	—	—	5–4	11–5
5	Germany	6	2	1	3	21	27	−6	7		—	—	—	0–8	—	4–1	11–1
6	Switzerland	6	1	0	5	13	33	−20	3		—	0–8	0–3	—	—	—	8–1
7	England	6	0	0	6	10	70	−60	0		0–20	2–13	1–7	—	—	—	—

Source: World Skate Europe

== Matches ==
=== Day 1 ===
8 October 2018; 16:00
8 October 2018; 16:00	Switzerland	0–3	Italy	Pavilhão Municipal, Mealhada
8 October 2018; 16:00		Report	Galeassi 8', 11', 34'	Pavilhão Municipal, Mealhada
	Umpires: Daniel Villar, Alberto Veiga (Spain)

8 October 2018; 18:00
8 October 2018; 18:00	Spain	6–1	France	Pavilhão Municipal, Mealhada
8 October 2018; 18:00	Casarramona 10'; Puigdueta 10'; Busquets 36', 38'; Lee 42'; S. González 49'	Report	Paredes 38'	Pavilhão Municipal, Mealhada
	Umpires: Massimiliano Carmazzi (Italy), Bruno Sosa (England)

8 October 2018; 21:00
8 October 2018; 21:00	England	2–13	Portugal	Pavilhão Municipal, Mealhada
8 October 2018; 21:00	Johns; Finch	Report	Ferreira x2 Vieira x2 Silva x3 Sousa x4 Balonas; Moncovio	Pavilhão Municipal, Mealhada
	Umpires: Daniel Löwe (Germany), Julien Thibaud (France)

=== Day 2 ===
9 October 2018; 9:30
9 October 2018; 9:30	Spain	12–0	Switzerland	Pavilhão Municipal, Mealhada
9 October 2018; 9:30	S. González 1'; Barcons 14', 20'; M. González 16'; Diez 21', 38', 47'; Lee 29', 32', 48'; Puigdueta 40'; Busquets 45'	Report		Pavilhão Municipal, Mealhada
	Umpires: Julien Thibaud (France), Daniel Löwe (Germany)

9 October 2018; 17:00
9 October 2018; 17:00	France	11–5	England	Pavilhão Municipal, Mealhada
9 October 2018; 17:00	Malard 2', 9', 34', 49'; Laboyrie 4', 14', 24', 28'; Paredes 31'; Lafourcade 43', 45'	Report	McCarthy 1', 31', 38', 49'; Todd 9'	Pavilhão Municipal, Mealhada
	Umpires: Alberto Veiga, Daniel Villar (Spain)

9 October 2018; 19:00
9 October 2018; 19:00	Italy	1–7	Spain	Pavilhão Municipal, Mealhada
9 October 2018; 19:00	Ghirardello 49'	Report	Casarramona 7'; Puigdueta 14', 41'; Lee 18'; Diez 26', 30'; Busquets 45'	Pavilhão Municipal, Mealhada
	Umpires: Florindo Cardoso, João Duarte (Portugal)

9 October 2018; 21:00
9 October 2018; 21:00	Portugal	4–1	Germany	Pavilhão Municipal, Mealhada
9 October 2018; 21:00	Sousa 1', 2'; Silva 35'; Ferreira 47'	Report	La Rocca 24'	Pavilhão Municipal, Mealhada
	Umpires: Bruno Sosa (England), Massimiliano Carmazzi (Italy)

=== Day 3 ===
10 October 2018; 9:30
10 October 2018; 9:30	Germany	0–8	France	Pavilhão Municipal, Mealhada
10 October 2018; 9:30		Report	Malard 9', 35', 43'; Laboyrie 10'; Daribo 12', 18'; Gohet 39'; Lafourcade 45'	Pavilhão Municipal, Mealhada
	Umpires: João Duarte, Florindo Cardoso (Portugal)

10 October 2018; 17:00
10 October 2018; 17:00	Switzerland	8–1	England	Pavilhão Municipal, Mealhada
10 October 2018; 17:00	Schuler 11', 34'; Pluss 16', 32', 38'; D. Senn 21', 22'; T. Senn 43'	Report	Kneeshaw 40'	Pavilhão Municipal, Mealhada
	Umpires: Daniel Löwe (Germany), Massimiliano Carmazzi (Italy)

10 October 2018; 19:00
10 October 2018; 19:00	Italy	3–3	Germany	Pavilhão Municipal, Mealhada
10 October 2018; 19:00	Ghirardello 29'; Maniero 37'; Tamiozzo 49'	Report	Wichardt 20', 26'; Neubert 42'	Pavilhão Municipal, Mealhada
	Umpires: Julien Thibaud (France), Bruno Sosa (England)

10 October 2018; 21:00
10 October 2018; 21:00	France	2–8	Portugal	Pavilhão Municipal, Mealhada
10 October 2018; 21:00	Laboyrie 5'; Daribo 49'	Report	Silva 9'; Sousa 15', 27', 47'; Moncovio 16'; Vieira 24'; Ferreira 25'; Florencio 33'	Pavilhão Municipal, Mealhada
	Umpires: Daniel Villar, Alberto Veiga (Spain)

=== Day 4 ===
11 October 2018; 9:30
11 October 2018; 9:30	England	1–7	Italy	Pavilhão Municipal, Mealhada
11 October 2018; 9:30	McCarthy	Report	Ghirardello x3 Galeassi x4	Pavilhão Municipal, Mealhada
	Umpires: Florindo Cardoso, João Duarte (Portugal)

11 October 2018; 17:00
11 October 2018; 17:00	Germany	4–1	Switzerland	Pavilhão Municipal, Mealhada
11 October 2018; 17:00	Neubert 1'; La Rocca 9', 47'; Hartje 27'	Report	Moor 44'	Pavilhão Municipal, Mealhada
	Umpires: Bruno Sosa (England), Massimiliano Carmazzi (Italy)

11 October 2018; 19:00
11 October 2018; 19:00	England	0–20	Spain	Pavilhão Municipal, Mealhada
11 October 2018; 19:00		Report	Casarramona 1', 9', 26', 27', 30'; Lee 1', 2', 33'; Puigdueta 8', 45'; Busquets 9', 28'; Diez 15', 19', 20', 24'; Barcons 15'; S. González 16', 46'; M. González 21'	Pavilhão Municipal, Mealhada
	Umpires: Daniel Löwe (Germany), Julien Thibaud (France)

11 October 2018; 21:00
11 October 2018; 21:00	Portugal	5–0	Italy	Pavilhão Municipal, Mealhada
11 October 2018; 21:00	Silva 15', 26'; Vieira 22'; Ferreira 41', 49'	Report		Pavilhão Municipal, Mealhada
	Umpires: Alberto Veiga, Daniel Villar (Spain)

=== Day 5 ===
12 October 2018; 17:00
12 October 2018; 17:00	Italy	3–2	France	Pavilhão Municipal, Mealhada
12 October 2018; 17:00	Galeassi 9', 48'; Lapolla 46'	Report	Laboyrie 24'; Paredes 45'	Pavilhão Municipal, Mealhada
	Umpires: Bruno Sosa (England), Daniel Löwe (Germany)

12 October 2018; 19:00
12 October 2018; 19:00	Spain	10–2	Germany	Pavilhão Municipal, Mealhada
12 October 2018; 19:00	S. González 2'; Puigdueta 15', 27', 35'; M. González 15'; Lee 20', 38'; Busquets 23'; Diez 45'; Barcons 47'	Report	Wichardt 26', 45'	Pavilhão Municipal, Mealhada
	Umpires: João Duarte, Florindo Cardoso (Portugal)

12 October 2018; 21:00
12 October 2018; 21:00	Switzerland	0–8	Portugal	Pavilhão Municipal, Mealhada
12 October 2018; 21:00		Report	Ferreira 19', 42', 49'; Sousa 33', 45', 48'; Silva 37', 42'	Pavilhão Municipal, Mealhada
	Umpires: Daniel Villar, Alberto Veiga (Spain)

=== Day 6 ===
13 October 2018; 17:00
13 October 2018; 17:00	France	5–4	Switzerland	Pavilhão Municipal, Mealhada
13 October 2018; 17:00	Gohet 12'; Malard 23', 49'; Laboyrie 35'; Daribo 47'	Report	Schuler 11', 41'; Moor 37', 38'	Pavilhão Municipal, Mealhada
	Umpires: Florindo Cardoso, João Duarte (Portugal)

13 October 2018; 19:00
13 October 2018; 19:00	Germany	11–1	England	Pavilhão Municipal, Mealhada
13 October 2018; 19:00	Hartje 1', 32', 35'; Wichardt 2', 9', 19', 21'; Kahmann 21', 34'; La Rocca 24'; Neubert 36'	Report	McCarthy 40'	Pavilhão Municipal, Mealhada
	Umpires: Alberto Veiga, Daniel Villar (Spain)

13 October 2018; 21:00
13 October 2018; 21:00	Portugal	2–4	Spain	Pavilhão Municipal, Mealhada
13 October 2018; 21:00	Sousa 3'; Balonas 6'	Report	M. González 21'; Casarramona 24'; Busquets 26'; S. González 36'	Pavilhão Municipal, Mealhada
	Umpires: Massimiliano Carmazzi (Italy), Julien Thibaud (France)
