= Arno Camenisch =

Swiss writer

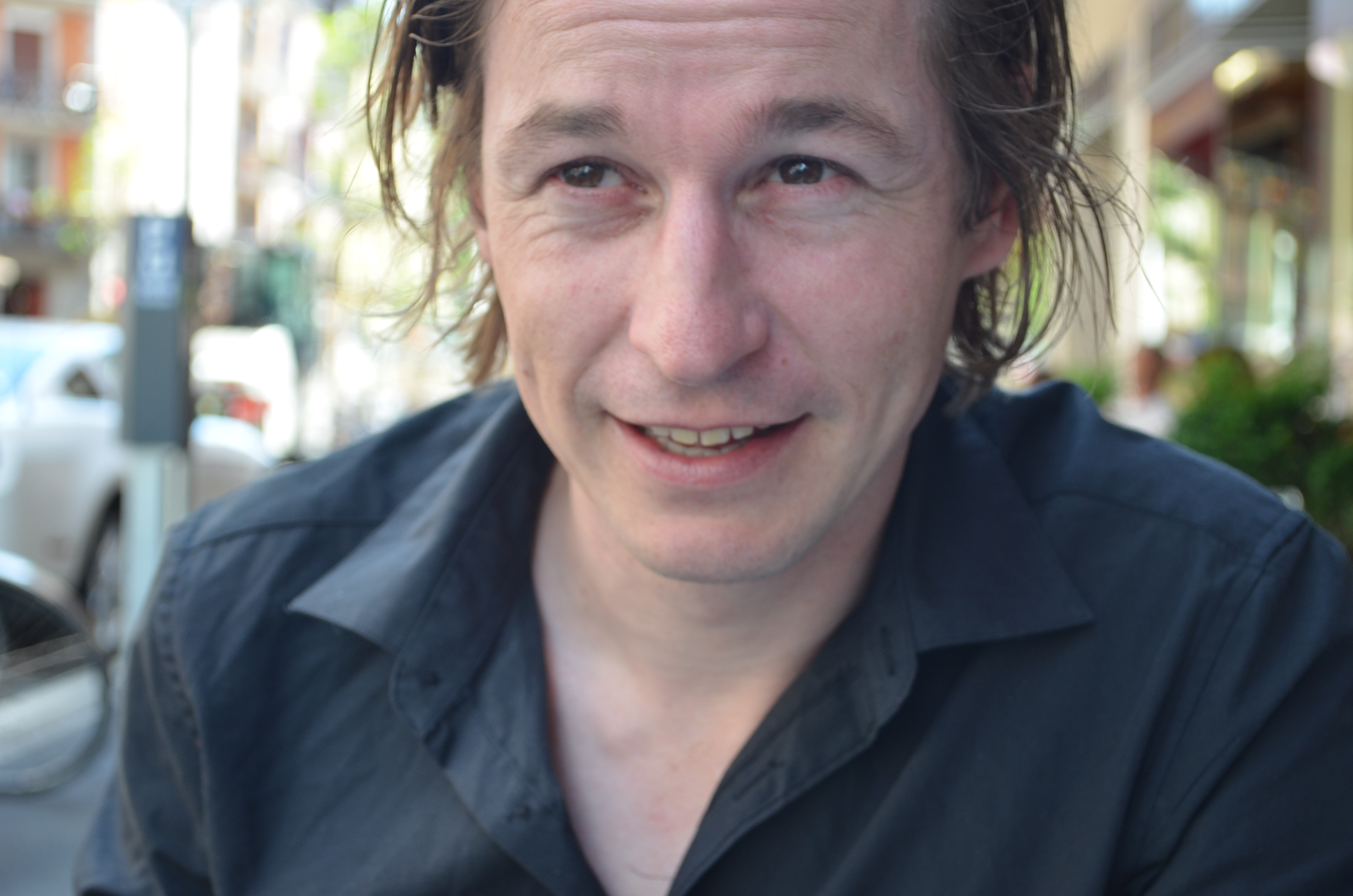
- Arno Camenisch, Zurich 2014
- Born: 1 February 1978 (age 48); Tavanasa, Switzerland
- Occupations: Novelist, poet, playwright
- Writing career
- Language: German, Romansh
- Period: 2005–present
- Notable work: Sez Ner
- Website: arnocamenisch.ch

Arno Camenisch (born 1 February 1978 in the village of Tavanasa in the Swiss Canton Grisons) is a Swiss writer publishing in German and Romansh.

== Biography ==
Camenisch grew up in Tavanasa and moved to Chur to study at a teacher training college at the age of sixteen. After finishing his degree as an elementary school teacher he decided to travel all over the world, including half a year- residencies in Australia and Ecuador. Whilst travelling Middle and South America, Camenisch with his Romansh background easily picked up Spanish. After a short return to Switzerland, Camenisch moved to Madrid, where he was employed as a teacher at the Colegio Suizo de Madrid from 2004 to 2007. Since 2007, Camenisch's place of residence is the bilingual city of Biel/Bienne in the canton of Berne where he attended the Bern School of Arts (Class 2007–2010) and received a Bachelor's Diploma in Literary Writing.

Camenisch is father to one daughter who lives with her mother, his former wife, in Biel/Bienne. This constellation is frequently mentioned by Camenisch himself as the reason why he decided to make Biel/Bienne his permanent place of residence after finishing his Bachelor's Diploma and lives there to the day.

Most of his publications are deeply influenced by his roots in the Romansh-speaking part of Switzerland in terms of content and linguistic form.

== Literary career ==
Camenisch writes prose, poetry and plays. In the Anglophone world, he is best known for his novel Sez Ner (translated under the English title The Alp by Donal McLaughlin), about life in a modern Alpine village, which was written jointly in two languages - first in German, afterwards re-written by himself in Romansh.

=== Beginnings ===
While still a student at the Bern School of Arts, Arno Camenisch met his future editor and publisher in unison Urs Engeler at a reading session. They instantly formed a productive bond and teamed up as author and editor. Since Sez Ner, Arno Camenisch exclusively publishes new prose works via the self-titled Engeler-Verlag.

=== The "Alpine Trilogy" ===
==== Sez Ner (The Alp), 2009 ====
With German and Romansh printed side to side, Sez Ner portrays the life of a group of men and their daily chores on an Alp. Characters are only represented by their profession and do not have proper nouns. Critics widely recognized Sez Ner as a lively but fictional portrayal of Swiss Alpine life. Camenisch's style of writing especially within Sez Ner sometimes evokes a feeling of reality being depicted, which Camenisch denies continuously - instead, he insists on his writing as a result of extensive knowledge about the people, landscape and culture he chooses to describe.

==== Hinter dem Bahnhof (Behind The Station ), 2010 ====
Hinter dem Bahnhof (Engl. title Behind The Station) is the second prose work in the Grisons Trilogy. With a highly stylized Swiss German Grisons dialect, the narrator, a child of pre-school age, tells about his life with parents, grandparents and his brother in a micro-village in Grisons. Camenisch has confessed that various elements of the story are autobiographic, but is rather taciturn about which ones they are.

Initially, Camenisch's intent was not even to publish the book, instead, he just told his editor Urs Engeler about a prose fragment that he had written about his childhood, but just for himself. Engeler then convinced Camenisch to show him what he had written down. Eventually, they decided to make the text his second novel to be published by Engeler.

The universal imagery of childhood contributes to a large part to the novel's popularity with its audience: Though its language clearly roots the story in Switzerland, foreign readers often state a feeling of nostalgia towards their own childhood in other places evoked by reading Hinter dem Bahnhof.

==== Ustrinkata (Last Last Orders), 2012 ====
After two books with interconnected settings had been published, Camenisch decided to round up the portrayal of his region of origin with the play-like novel Ustrinkata.

The plot is set around the closing evening of a local pub in a Grisons village. Camenisch has confirmed the closing of his aunt's pub Helvezia in Tavanasa to have been the initiative inspiration to write his novel. Special about the prose in this publication is its rule of dialogue that gives way to characterizing the novel rather than as a play for the stage.

For Ustrinkata, Camenisch received the Swiss Literature Award.

=== Other ===
Camenisch has been a member of the Spoken Word Ensemble Bern ist überall until 2016.

== Bibliography ==
- Ernesto ed autras manzegnas (2005)
- Sez Ner (2009). The Alp, trans. Donal McLaughlin (Dalkey Archive, 2014)
- Hinter dem Bahnhof (2010). Behind the Station, trans. Donal McLaughlin (Dalkey Archive, 2014)
- Ustrinkata (2012). Last Last Orders, trans. Donal McLaughlin (Dalkey Archive, 2016)
- Las flurs dil di (2013)
- Fred und Franz (2013)
- Nächster Halt Verlangen. Geschichten I (2014)
- Die Kur (2015)
- Die Launen des Tages. Geschichten II (2016)
- Der letzte Schnee (2018)
- Herr Anselm (2019)
- Goldene Jahre (2020)
- Der Schatten über dem Dorf (2021)
- Die Welt (2022)

== Adaptations ==
Sez Ner, Ustrinkata, Las flurs dil di, Fred und Franz and Der letzte Schnee have been adapted for the stage by different Swiss theaters.

A movie adaption for Die Kur has been announced but has not taken place yet.

For Sez Ner, Camenisch has recorded a bilingual audiobook with each three audio discs in German and Romansh. Hinter dem Bahnhof is available as a German audiobook edition as well. The short story collections Nächster Halt Verlangen. Geschichten I and Die Launen des Tages. Geschichten II are also available as audiobooks read by the author himself.

Radio Play versions of Ustrinkata, Fred und Franz and Der Letzte Schnee have been produced in cooperation with the Swiss Radio and Television (SRF).
