= 2013 CERH Women's Euro =

CERH Women's Euro 2013
2013 Roller Hockey European Championship Campeonato europeo de hockey sobre patines femenino de 2013

Tournament details
- Host country: Spain
- Dates: 17 – 21 December
- Teams: 4
- Venue(s): 1 (in 1 host city)

Final positions
- Champions: Spain (4th title)
- Runners-up: Portugal
- Third place: Italy
- Fourth place: France

Tournament statistics
- Matches played: 10

The CERH Women's Euro 2013 or 2013 CERH Women's Championship was the 12th edition of the CERH European Women's Roller Hockey Championship, held between 17 and 21 December, in Mieres, Asturias, Spain.

The tournament was initially dated for 9 to 14 September, but was suspended as there were not at least five teams.

== Round-robin Stage ==
=== Standings ===
Pos	Team	Pts	Pld	W	D	L	GF	GA	GD
1	Portugal	9	3	3	0	0	19	8	+11
2	Spain	6	3	2	0	1	12	4	+8
3	Italy	3	3	1	0	2	5	13	-8
4	France	0	3	0	0	3	4	15	-11

=== Games ===
1st round - 17 December 2013

17 December 2013
20:00 (CET)

Portugal	7 - 3 (4 - 0)	Italy
1-0 Marlene Sousa 1´1st Hf; 2-0 Marlene Sousa LD 12´1st Hf; 3-0 Rute Lopes 16´1st Hf; 4-0 Rute Lopes 19´1st Hf; 5-1 Inês Ferreira 10´2nd Hf; 6-1 Ana Catarina Ferreira LD 13´2nd Hf; 7-1 Rita Dias 14´2nd Hf		4-1 Elena Tomiozzo 7´ 2nd Hf; 7-2 Maria Teresa Mele LD 15´2nd Hf; 7-3 Maria Teresa Mele 18´2nd Hf

Referee: Xavier Blauzen (France) & Isaac Sanz (Spain)
17 December 2013
21:15 (CET)

France	0 - 5 (0 - 3)	Spain
		0-1 Laura Puigdueta 15´1st Hf; 0-2 Natasha Lee 18´1st Hf; 0-3 Laura Puigdueta 20´1st Hf; 0-4 Maria Diez 11´2nd Hf; 0-5 Sara Gonzales 11´2nd Hf

Referee: Carlo Corponi (Italy) & Jaime Vieira (Portugal)

2nd Round - 18 December 2013

18 December 2013
20:00 (CET)

Portugal	8 - 3 (3 - 2)	France
1-1 Rita "Bombardeira" Dias 6' 1st Hf; 2-1 Rita Lopes 8' 1st Hf; 3-2 Ana Catarina Ferreira 18' 1st Hf; 4-2 Rute Lopes LD 4' 2nd Hf; 5-2 Marlene Sousa LD 4' 2nd Hf; 6-2 Rute Lopes 5' 2nd Hf; 7-2 Marlene Sousa 11' 2nd Hf; 8-3 Rute Lopes 16' 2nd Hf		0-1 Nolween Bena 1' 1st Hf; 2-2 Frederique Denest GP 9' 1st Hf; 7-3 Maeva Manceau 15' 2nd Hf

Referee: Carlo Corponi (Italy) & Isaac Sanz (Spain)
18 December 2013
21:15 (CET)

Italy	0 - 5 (0 - 2)	Spain
		0-1 Anna Casarramona 8' 1st Hf; 0-2 Berta Tarrida GP 18' 1st Hf; 0-3 Anna Casarramona 12' 2nd Hf; 0-4 Nara López 19' 2nd Hf; 0-5 Natasha Lee GP 20' 2nd Hf

Referee: Xavier Blauzen (France) e Jaime Vieira (Portugal)

3rd Round - 19 December 2013

19 December 2013
20:00 (CET)

France	1 - 2 (1 - 1)	Italy
1-1 Camille Renier 18´1st Hf		0-1 Elena Tamiozzo 4´1st Hf; 1-2 Maria Teresa Mele LD 18´2nd Hf

Referee: Isaac Sanz (Spain) & Jaime Vieira (Portugal)
19 December 2013
21:15 (CET)

Portugal	4 - 2 (2 - 2)	Spain
1-2 Marlene Sousa 15´1st Hf; 2-2 Rita Lopes 16´1st Hf; 3-2 Inês Vieira 10´2nd Hf; 4-2 Marlene Sousa 17´2nd Hf		0-1 Natasha Lee 6´ 1st Hf; 0-2 Berta Tarrida 8´ 1st Hf

Referee: Xavier Blauzen (France) & Carlo Corponi (Italy)

== Championship knock-out ==
Semi-finals
20-Dec-2013 - 20:00 (CET)
Spain	4
Italy	1
20-Dec-2013 - 21:15 (CET)
Portugal	7
France	1

Final
21-Dec-2013 - 19:45 (CET)
Spain	7
Portugal	0
Third place
21-Dec-2013 - 18:30 (CET)
Italy	5
France	0

=== Games ===
Semi-finals - 20 December 2013

20 December 2013
20:00 (CET)

Spain	4 - 1 (2 - 0)	Italy
1-0 Laura Puigdueta 15m 1st Hf; 2-0 Berta Tarrida 17m 1st Hf; 3-0 Maria Diez GP 10m 2nd Hf; 4-0 Anna Casarramona 11 m 2nd Hf		4-1 Laura Minuzzo 19m 2nd Hf

Referee: Xavier Blauzen (France) & Jaime Vieira (Portugal)
20 December 2013
21:15 (CET)

Portugal	7 - 1 (6 - 0)	France
1-0 Rita Dias 1´1st Hf; 2-0 Ana Catarina Ferreira 2´1st Hf; 3-0 Ana Catarina Ferreira 6´1st Hf; 4-0 Rita Lopes 13´1st Hf; 5-0 Rita Lopes 15´1st Hf; 6-0 Carolina Gonçalves 15´1st Hf; 7-0 Rita Lopes 13´2nd Hf		7-1 Amina Nedder 14´2nd Hf

Referee: Carlo Corponi (Itaçy) e Isaac Sanz (Spain)

3rd Place

21 December 2013
18:30 (CET)

Italy	5-0 (2 - 0)	France
1-0 Elena Tamiozzo 13' 1st Hf; 2-0 Elena Tamiozzo GP 15' 1st Hf; 3-0 Pamela Lapolla 2' 2nd Hf; 4-0 Elena Toffaniu 11' 2nd Hf; 5-0 Elena Tamiozzo 14' 2nd Hf

Referee: Jaime Vieira (Portugal) & Isaac Sanz (Spain)

Final

21 December 2013
19:45 (CET)

Spain	7-0	Portugal
1-0 Maria Diez 2' 1st Hf; 2-0 Maria Diez 9' 1st Hf; 3-0 Anna Casaramonna 1' 2nd Hf; 4-0 Natasha Lee 6' 2nd Hf; 5-0 Natasha Lee LD 10ªF 8' 2nd Hf; 6-0 Laura Puigdueta 9' 2nd Hf; 7-0 Maria Diez LD 17' 2nd Hf

Referee: Xavier Blauzen (France) & Carlo Corponi (Italy)

== Final ranking ==
Rank	Team
Gold medal	Spain
Silver medal	Portugal
Bronze medal	Italy
4	France

2013 European Champions
SPAIN
4th
