= Sara González =

Sara González may refer to:

- Sara González (footballer) (born 1989), Spanish footballer
- Sara M. Gonzalez, New York City Council member
- Sara González Gómez (?–2012), Cuban singer
- Sara González Lolo (born 1992), Spanish quad hockey player
