= 2015 CERH Women's Euro =

CERH Women's Euro 2013
2015 Roller Hockey European Championship

Tournament details
- Host country: Italy
- Dates: 25 – 29 August
- Teams: 5
- Venue(s): 1 (in 1 host city)

Final positions
- Champions: Spain (5th title)
- Runners-up: Portugal
- Third place: Italy
- Fourth place: Germany

Tournament statistics
- Matches played: 10
- Goals scored: 57 (5.7 per match)

The CERH Women's Euro 2015 or 2015 CERH Women's Championship was the 13th edition of the CERH European Women's Roller Hockey Championship, held between 25 and 29 August, in Matera, Italy. The competition was contested by five teams in a Round-robin format.

== Standings ==
Pos	Team	Pts	Pld	W	D	L	GF	GA	GD
1	Spain	12	4	4	0	0	23	3	+20
2	Portugal	9	4	3	0	1	10	7	+3
3	Italy	6	4	2	0	2	16	12	+4
4	Germany	3	4	1	0	3	6	10	-4
5	France	0	4	0	0	4	2	25	-23

	Matches	(Spain)	(Portugal)	(Italy)	(Germany)	(France)
1	Spain		2–1	6–2	3–0	12–0
2	Portugal			4–3	2–1	3–1
3	Italy				5–1	6–1
4	Germany					4–0
5	France					

Source: CERH

== Games ==
=== Day 1 ===
25 August 2015; 19:00
25 August 2015; 19:00	Spain	12–0	France	Tensostruttura, Matera
25 August 2015; 19:00	S. González (7'); M. Díez (8', 9', 12', 30', 37', 38'); N. Lee (20'); A. Casarramona (29'); Y. Font (34', 40'); B. Tarrida (40')	Report		Tensostruttura, Matera
	Umpires: Giovanni Andrisani (ITA), Carsten Niestroy (GER)

25 August 2015; 21:00
25 August 2015; 21:00	Italy	5–1	Germany	Tensostruttura, Matera
25 August 2015; 21:00	E. Tamiozzo (10', 33'); M. T. Mele (21'); G. Galeassi (28'); J. Raffaelli (40')	Report	(26') M. Wichardt	Tensostruttura, Matera
	Umpires: Stéphane Rizzotti (FRA), José Pinto (POR)

=== Day 2 ===
26 August 2015; 19:00
26 August 2015; 19:00	Germany	4–0	France	Tensostruttura, Matera
26 August 2015; 19:00	S. Firll (14'); M. Wichardt (22', 31'); F. Neubert (34')	Report		Tensostruttura, Matera
	Umpires: Raffaele Strippoli (ITA), Giovanni Andrisani (ITA)

26 August 2015; 21:00
26 August 2015; 21:00	Italy	3–4	Portugal	Tensostruttura, Matera
26 August 2015; 21:00	M. T. Mele (6', 32'); G. Galeassi (28')	Report	(1') Ru. Lopes (3') M. Silva (19', 27') Ri. Lopes	Tensostruttura, Matera
	Umpires: José Gómez (ESP), Stéphane Rizzotti (FRA)

=== Day 3 ===
27 August 2015; 19:00
27 August 2015; 19:00	Portugal	2–1	Germany	Tensostruttura, Matera
27 August 2015; 19:00	M. Sousa (2'); A. C. Ferreira (27')	Report	(29') M. Wichardt	Tensostruttura, Matera
	Umpires: José Gómez (ESP), Raffaele Strippoli (ITA)

27 August 2015; 21:00
27 August 2015; 21:00	Spain	6–2	Italy	Tensostruttura, Matera
27 August 2015; 21:00	L. Puigdueta (5', 12', 24'); M. Díez (8', 24'); A. Casarramona (27')	Report	(4') E. Tamiozzo (40') M. T. Mele	Tensostruttura, Matera
	Umpires: José Pinto (POR), Carsten Niestroy (GER)

=== Day 4 ===
28 August 2015; 19:00
28 August 2015; 19:00	France	1–3	Portugal	Tensostruttura, Matera
28 August 2015; 19:00	F. Denest (40')	Report	(17', 27') A. Ferreira (40') C. Gonçalves	Tensostruttura, Matera
	Umpires: Carsten Niestroy (GER), José Gómex (ESP)

28 August 2015; 21:00
28 August 2015; 21:00	Germany	0–3	Spain	Tensostruttura, Matera
28 August 2015; 21:00		Report	(7') L. Puigdueta (15', 23') M. Díez	Tensostruttura, Matera
	Umpires: Stéphane Rizzoti (FRA), José Pinto (POR)

=== Day 5 ===
29 August 2015; 19:00
29 August 2015; 19:00	Italy	6–1	France	Tensostruttura, Matera
29 August 2015; 19:00	E. Tamiozzo (6', 27', 29'); G. Galeassi (13'); M. T. Mele (30', 31')	Report	(15') C. Gohet	Tensostruttura, Matera
	Umpires: José Gómez (ESP), José Pinto (POR)

29 August 2015; 21:00
29 August 2015; 21:00	Portugal	1–2	Spain	Tensostruttura, Matera
29 August 2015; 21:00	M. Sousa (4')	Report	(7') L. Puigdueta (25') M. Díez	Tensostruttura, Matera
	Umpires: Giovanni Andrisani (ITA), Raffaele Strippoli (ITA)

== Final ranking ==
Rank	Team
Gold medal	Spain
Silver medal	Portugal
Bronze medal	Italy
4	Germany
5	France

2015 European Champions
Spain
5th title
