= 2012 FIRS Women's Roller Hockey World Cup =

Sporting event held in Brazil

Recife 2012

Tournament details
- Host country: Brazil
- Dates: 10 November – 17 November
- Teams: 14
- Venue: 1 (in 1 host city)

Final positions
- Champions: France (1st title)
- Runners-up: Spain
- Third place: Colombia
- Fourth place: Portugal

Tournament statistics
- Matches played: 43
- Goals scored: 268 (6.23 per match)
- Top scorer(s): (Spain) Natasha Lee (Switzerland) Stephanie Moor (12 goals)

The 2012 FIRS Women's Roller Hockey World Cup or Recife 2012 was the 11th edition of the women's roller hockey world cup. It was held in Recife, Brazil from November 10 to November 17, 2012 and it was contested by fourteen teams, two less than the previous edition. France defeated 4-times champion Spain in the final to win the World Cup for the first time.

== Group stage ==
=== Group A ===
| Pos | Team | Pld | W | D | L | GF | GA | GD | Pts |
|---|---|---|---|---|---|---|---|---|---|
| 1 | Chile | 2 | 2 | 0 | 0 | 16 | 4 | +12 | 6 |
| 2 | Argentina | 2 | 1 | 0 | 1 | 10 | 6 | +4 | 3 |
| 3 | United States | 2 | 0 | 0 | 2 | 3 | 19 | −16 | 0 |

| 11 Nov 2012 20:30 | Chile | 11–2 | United States |
| 12 Nov 2012 17:30 | Argentina | 8–1 | United States |
| 13 Nov 2012 19:00 | Chile | 5–2 | Argentina |

=== Group B ===
| Pos | Team | Pld | W | D | L | GF | GA | GD | Pts |
|---|---|---|---|---|---|---|---|---|---|
| 1 | Portugal | 2 | 2 | 0 | 0 | 9 | 2 | +7 | 6 |
| 2 | France | 2 | 1 | 0 | 1 | 6 | 5 | +1 | 3 |
| 3 | Switzerland | 2 | 0 | 0 | 2 | 2 | 10 | −8 | 0 |

| 11 Nov 2012 17:30 | Portugal | 6–0 | Switzerland |
| 12 Nov 2012 15:00 | France | 4–2 | Switzerland |
| 13 Nov 2012 17:30 | Portugal | 3–2 | France |

=== Group C ===
| Pos | Team | Pld | W | D | L | GF | GA | GD | Pts |
|---|---|---|---|---|---|---|---|---|---|
| 1 | Spain | 3 | 3 | 0 | 0 | 31 | 2 | +29 | 9 |
| 2 | Brazil | 3 | 2 | 0 | 1 | 9 | 7 | +2 | 6 |
| 3 | Uruguay | 3 | 1 | 0 | 2 | 5 | 14 | −9 | 3 |
| 4 | England | 3 | 0 | 0 | 3 | 1 | 23 | −22 | 0 |

| 10 Nov 2012 20:00 | Brazil | 1–0 | Uruguay |
| 11 Nov 2012 15:00 | Spain | 12–0 | England |
| 12 Nov 2012 13:30 | Spain | 12–0 | Uruguay |
| 12 Nov 2012 20:30 | Brazil | 6–0 | England |
| 13 Nov 2012 13:30 | Uruguay | 5–1 | England |
| 13 Nov 2012 20:30 | Spain | 7–2 | Brazil |

=== Group D ===
| Pos | Team | Pld | W | D | L | GF | GA | GD | Pts |
|---|---|---|---|---|---|---|---|---|---|
| 1 | Colombia | 3 | 3 | 0 | 0 | 16 | 2 | +14 | 9 |
| 2 | Germany | 3 | 2 | 0 | 1 | 17 | 2 | +15 | 6 |
| 3 | India | 3 | 1 | 0 | 2 | 4 | 17 | −13 | 3 |
| 4 | Japan | 3 | 0 | 0 | 3 | 3 | 19 | −16 | 0 |

| 11 Nov 2012 13:30 | Colombia | 7–0 | India |
| 11 Nov 2012 19:00 | Germany | 9–0 | Japan |
| 12 Nov 2012 12:00 | Germany | 8–0 | India |
| 12 Nov 2012 19:00 | Colombia | 7–1 | Japan |
| 13 Nov 2012 12:00 | India | 4–2 | Japan |
| 13 Nov 2012 15:00 | Colombia | 2–1 | Germany |

== Play-off stages ==
Quarter-finals
15 Nov 2012 16:00
Spain | 3
Germany | 1
15 Nov 2012 21:00
Argentina | 0
Portugal | 2
15 Nov 2012 17:30
Colombia | 3
Brazil | 0
15 Nov 2012 19:30
Chile | 1
France | 6

Semi-finals
16 Nov 2012 18:00
Spain | 4
Portugal | 3
16 Nov 2012 19:30
Colombia | 0
France | 1

Final
17 Nov 2012 22:30
Spain | 3
France | 4
Third place
17 Nov 2012 21:00
Portugal | 2
Colombia | 3

5th to 8th placing
| 16 Nov 2012 15:00 | Germany | 2–1 | Argentina |
| 16 Nov 2012 16:30 | Chile | 2–0 | Brazil |
7th place
| 17 Nov 2012 15:00 | Argentina | 3–2 | Brazil |
5th place
| 17 Nov 2012 16:30 | Germany | 2–1 | Chile |

2012 FIRS Women's Roller Hockey World Cup champion

France
First title

=== 9th to 14th placing ===
| Pos | Team | Pld | W | D | L | GF | GA | GD | Pts |
|---|---|---|---|---|---|---|---|---|---|
| 1 | Switzerland | 5 | 5 | 0 | 0 | 27 | 7 | +20 | 15 |
| 2 | United States | 5 | 4 | 0 | 1 | 21 | 17 | +4 | 12 |
| 3 | Japan | 5 | 2 | 0 | 3 | 11 | 15 | −4 | 6 |
| 4 | Uruguay | 5 | 2 | 0 | 3 | 14 | 15 | −1 | 6 |
| 5 | England | 5 | 1 | 0 | 4 | 10 | 21 | −11 | 3 |
| 5 | India | 5 | 1 | 0 | 4 | 17 | 25 | −8 | 3 |

| 15 Nov 2012 09:00 | Japan | 3–2 | Uruguay |
| 15 Nov 2012 10:30 | England | 5–4 | India |
| 15 Nov 2012 12:00 | Switzerland | 6–0 | United States |
| 15 Nov 2012 22:30 | Japan | 1–0 | England |
| 16 Nov 2012 09:00 | Uruguay | 4–3 | India |
| 16 Nov 2012 10:30 | Switzerland | 4–2 | Japan |
| 16 Nov 2012 12:00 | United States | 6–2 | England |
| 16 Nov 2012 21:00 | United States | 3–0 | Uruguay |
| 16 Nov 2012 22:30 | Switzerland | 7–0 | India |
| 17 Nov 2012 08:00 | Switzerland | 5–3 | Uruguay |
| 17 Nov 2012 09:30 | United States | 7–6 | India |
| 17 Nov 2012 18:00 | Switzerland | 5–2 | England |
| 17 Nov 2012 19:30 | United States | 5–3 | Japan |

== Final ranking ==
| Rank | Team | PE |
|---|---|---|
| Gold medal | France | ▲1 |
| Silver medal | Spain | ▲1 |
| Bronze medal | Colombia | ▲2 |
| 4 | Portugal | ▲2 |
| 5 | Germany | ▼1 |
| 6 | Chile | ▲3 |
| 7 | Argentina | ▼6 |
| 8 | Brazil | ▲3 |
| 9 | Switzerland | ▲1 |
| 10 | United States | ▼2 |
| 11 | Japan | ▲1 |
| 12 | Uruguay | New entry |
| 13 | England | ▼7 |
| 14 | India | ▲1 |

== Top scorers ==
12 goals

- (Spain) Natasha Lee
- (Switzerland) Stephanie Moor

10 goals

- (France) Tatiana Malard

9 goals

- (Spain) María Díez
- (Chile) Francisca Donoso

7 goals

- (Germany) Maren Wichardt

6 goals

- (Colombia) Catalina Acevedo
- (Colombia) Andrea Rodríguez
- (Germany) Laura La Rocca
- (Switzerland) Tanja Kammermann

5 goals

- (Spain) Yolanda Font
- (Portugal) Rute Lopes
- (Portugal) Marlene Sousa
- (Argentina) Yanina Defilche
- (United States) Erin House
- (United States) Autumn Lee
- (England) Kirsty Ingham
- (India) Yasndeep Kaur

4 goals

- (Spain) Anna Casarramona
- (Chile) Macarena Ramos
- (Chile) Fernanda Urrea
- (Argentina) Luciana Giunta
- (Brazil) Erica Bueno
- (Brazil) Mariana Cabral
- (Switzerland) Daniela Senn
- (United States) Kimberley Hughes
- (Japan) Kaori Ito
- (Uruguay) Ana Noelia Trinidate
- (India) Mandeep Kaur

== See also ==
- FIRS Women's Roller Hockey World Cup
