= Faculty of Theology of the Evangelical Baptist Union of Spain =

- Former names: Baptist Theological Institute, Baptist Seminary in Barcelona
- Type: Seminary
- Established: 1922
- Affiliations: Baptist Evangelical Union of Spain
- Academic affiliations: Consortium of European Theological Baptist Schools
- President: Julio Díaz Piñeiro
- Academic staff: 20
- Students: 40
- Location: Alcobendas, Comunidad de Madrid, Spain
- Campus: Suburban
- Website: www.ftuebe.es

The Faculty of Theology of the Evangelical Baptist Union of Spain (Spanish: Facultad de Teología de la Unión Evangélica Bautista de España), also known as the Theological Seminary of UEBE (Spanish: Seminario Teológico UEBE), is an accredited theological Institute offering graduate and undergraduate degrees in theology. It is affiliated with the Baptist Evangelical Union of Spain. The seminary campus is located in Alcobendas in the Comunidad de Madrid, Spain.

== History ==
In 1922, the Baptist Theological Institute (Instituto Teológico Bautista) is founded in Barcelona by an American mission of the International Mission Board. The faculty was composed of Nils Bengston, Ambrosio Celma, Everett Gill and Percy Buffard, founder of the Spanish Christian Mission, based in Valdepeñas (Ciudad Real). In 1925 Baptist missionary Vincent Leroy David arrived in Spain and took up the position of director. By 1926 the seminary had fourteen students and, two years later, ten. At this time the faculty of teachers was formed by Vincent L. David, his wife, Nils Bengston and Emilio Mora. One program aimed at training men for the pastorate, while the other trained lay leaders for work at the various Baptist missions.

The seminary was very dependent on aid from North American and was negatively affected by the Great Depression. The contributions of the FMB to the Baptist work in Spain decreased by 33%, and the Baptist Theological Institute of Barcelona had to temporarily cease functioning in 1929. In the fall of 1948 the seminary was reopened with six students after nineteen inactive years. The new director was Dr. Jorge Jennings who had been sent to Spain by the FMB. Classes resumed in a rented building in a popular neighborhood of Barcelona which served both as a study center student housing. Soon the seminary had its own building on Camp Street in Barcelona, bought by the FMB, which in 1957 was expanded and modernized. By then the seminary's director was Dr. Roy Wyatt. The restrictions in Francoist Spain to the Spanish, non-Catholic confessions were hardened in the 1950s, but nonetheless the seminary continued to function. In the 1960s the seminary was closed on two occasions due to internal problems (1959-1961 and 1962-1963).

In 1976, the school moves from Barcelona to the city of Alcobendas in the Comunidad de Madrid. The new installations of what would be a seminary and Baptist center were inaugurated in this town on the outskirts of Madrid. While this decision did not satisfy some Spanish Baptists, but the time and the urban development of the city ended up affirming the Baptist leaders who defended the convenience of placing the most representative institution of Baptist work in the center of the country. In 1978 Mr. José Borrás Cerveró was appointed director, becoming the first Spaniard to accede to this position in fifty-six years. Since then, the successive directors of the Baptist Seminary have been Spanish, and its staff of teachers has also been reinforced with native staff.

In 1997, the seminary takes the name of Theological Seminary of UEBE (Seminario Teológico UEBE).

== Campus ==
The campus is located at 134 Calle Marqués de la Valdavia in Alcobendas and is 15 to 20 minutes away from central Madrid by train (cercanías). "The Seminary is close to parks, schools, recreational facilities, and various, metro, train, and bus stations. The Seminary building is both residential and educational."

== Academics ==
Since 1922, the seminary has been training most of the Spanish Baptist pastors and leaders, but also of other evangelical denominations, offering formation programs that respond to the current ecclesial and ministerial needs inside and outside Spanish territory. In a 2014 interview Dr. Julio Díaz Piñeiro, director of the seminary, said, "Churches must recognize theological education as part of the teaching ministry of the church, and theological institutions, on the other hand, be at the service of congregations, not of themselves or of a misunderstood intelligentsia."

The seminary offers two accredited degree programs: Bachelor of Theology and Master of Theology. In addition to these the seminary offers others non-accredited degrees and diplomas.

The seminary publishes the Protestant Theological Journal as well.

== Accreditation ==
In September 2011 the seminary received civil accreditation.
