= 2016 FIRS Women's Roller Hockey World Cup =

International football competition

Tournament details
- Host country: Chile
- Dates: 24 September – 1 October
- Teams: 13
- Venue(s): 1 (in 1 host city)

Final positions
- Champions: Spain (5th title)
- Runners-up: Portugal
- Third place: Argentina
- Fourth place: France

Tournament statistics
- Matches played: 42
- Goals scored: 319 (7.6 per match)
- Top scorer(s): (Chile) Catalina Flores (Chile) Francisca Donoso (12 goals each)

The 2016 FIRS Women's Roller Hockey World Cup or Iquique 2016 was the 13th edition of the women's roller hockey world cup. It is held in Iquique, Chile from September 24 to October 1, 2016, and it was contested by thirteen teams. Spain defeated Portugal in the final to win the World Cup.

== Group stage ==
Winners and runners-up of each group qualified to play-off
Two best third placed teams qualified to play-off
Worst third placed team relegated to 9th-13th place play-off

=== Group A ===
Team	Pld	W	D	L	GF	GA	GD	Pts
Argentina	4	4	0	0	40	1	+39	12
Italy	4	2	1	1	23	5	+18	7
Colombia	4	2	1	1	24	13	+11	7
Brazil	4	1	0	3	13	26	−13	3
Egypt	4	0	0	4	1	56	−55	0

	Matches	(Argentina)	(Italy)	(Colombia)	(Brazil)	(Egypt)
1	Argentina		3–0	9–1	14–0	14–0
2	Italy			1–1	5–1	16–0
3	Colombia				6–2	16–0
4	Brazil					10–1
5	Egypt					

The match between Italy and Colombia ended in a 1–1 tie, giving both teams 1 point. However, as Italy won on the shootout, they are awarded an advantage against Colombia for tie-breaker purposes.

24 September 2016; 17:00
24 September 2016; 17:00	Italy	16–0	Egypt	Pista Municipal de Hockey Patín, Iquique
24 September 2016; 17:00	G. Galeassi (4); M. T. Mele (3); P. Lapolla (2); A. Sartori (2); E. Tamiozzo (2); F. Maniero (1); E. Toffanin (1); E. Ghirardello (1)	Report		Pista Municipal de Hockey Patín, Iquique
	Umpires: Álvaro Meza (CHI) / Ricardo Soares Leão (POR)

24 September 2016; 21:30
24 September 2016; 21:30	Argentina	9–1	Colombia	Pista Municipal de Hockey Patín, Iquique
24 September 2016; 21:30	D. Silva (4); V. Fernández (2); L. Agudo (1); A. Gutiérrez (1); S. Rodríguez (1)	Report	(1) C. Martínez	Pista Municipal de Hockey Patín, Iquique
	Umpires: Josep Ribo Navarro (ESP) / Ulderico Barbarisi (ITA)

25 September 2016; 11:00
25 September 2016; 11:00	Argentina	14–0	Egypt	Pista Municipal de Hockey Patín, Iquique
25 September 2016; 11:00	J. Fernández (3); L. Rodríguez (3); V. Silva (2); D. Silva (2); L. Agudo (1); A. Gutiérrez (1); S. Rodríguez (1); V. Diéguez (1)	Report		Pista Municipal de Hockey Patín, Iquique
	Umpires: Christian Madariaga (CHI) / Boris Tarassioux (FRA)

25 September 2016; 20:00
25 September 2016; 20:00	Italy	5–1	Brazil	Pista Municipal de Hockey Patín, Iquique
25 September 2016; 20:00	M. T. Mele (2); E. Tamiozzo (2); G. Galeassi (1)	Report	(1) A. Costa	Pista Municipal de Hockey Patín, Iquique
	Umpires: Boris Tarassioux (FRA) / Daniel Löwe (GER)

25 September 2016; 21:30
25 September 2016; 21:30	Colombia	16–0	Egypt	Pista Municipal de Hockey Patín, Iquique
25 September 2016; 21:30	C. Martínez (5); C. Morales (4); S. Bedoya (3); P. Gutiérrez (2); A. Rodríguez (1); D. Rivas (1)	Report		Pista Municipal de Hockey Patín, Iquique
	Umpires: Ricardo Soares Leão (POR) / Ricardo González (ARG)

26 September 2016; 11:00
26 September 2016; 11:00	Brazil	10–1	Egypt	Pista Municipal de Hockey Patín, Iquique
26 September 2016; 11:00	L. Pestana (4); A. Costa (3); A. Regueira (2); M. Oliveira (1)	Report	(1) S. Mohamed	Pista Municipal de Hockey Patín, Iquique
	Umpires: José Risso (ARG) / Isidro Martínez (CHI)

26 September 2016; 12:30
26 September 2016; 12:30	Italy	1–1 (2–1p)	Colombia	Pista Municipal de Hockey Patín, Iquique
26 September 2016; 12:30	G. Galeassi (1); E. Tamiozzo (penalty shoot-out scored); A. Sartori (penalty shoot-out scored)	Report	(1) J. Alzate; (penalty shoot-out scored) S. Bedoya; (penalty shoot-out missed) J. Alzate	Pista Municipal de Hockey Patín, Iquique
	Umpires: Leandro Azzi Agra (BRA) / Josep Ribo Navarro (ESP)

26 September 2016; 21:30
26 September 2016; 21:30	Argentina	14–0	Brazil	Pista Municipal de Hockey Patín, Iquique
26 September 2016; 21:30	L. Rodríguez (3); A. Gutíerrez (2); L. Agudo (2); S. Rodríguez (2); D. Silva (2); J. Fernández (2); V. Fernández (1)	Report		Pista Municipal de Hockey Patín, Iquique
	Umpires: Josep Ribo Navarro (ESP) / Germán Pinto (COL)

27 September 2016; 16:30
27 September 2016; 16:30	Colombia	6–2	Brazil	Pista Municipal de Hockey Patín, Iquique
27 September 2016; 16:30	A. Rodríguez (2); J. Alzate (2); P. Gutiérrez (1); C. Morales (1)	Report	(1) M. Pestana (1) A. Costa	Pista Municipal de Hockey Patín, Iquique
	Umpires: Boris Tarassioux (FRA) / Christian Madariaga (CHI)

27 September 2016; 21:30
27 September 2016; 21:30	Argentina	3–0	Italy	Pista Municipal de Hockey Patín, Iquique
27 September 2016; 21:30	S. Rodríguez (2); L. Agudo (1)	Report		Pista Municipal de Hockey Patín, Iquique
	Umpires: Ricardo Soares Leão (POR) / Daniel Löwe (GER)

=== Group B ===
Team	Pld	W	D	L	GF	GA	GD	Pts
Spain	3	3	0	0	22	2	+20	9
Portugal	3	2	0	1	17	5	+12	6
France	3	1	0	2	11	10	+1	3
South Africa	3	0	0	3	0	33	−33	0

	Matches	(Spain)	(Portugal)	(France)	(South Africa)
1	Spain		4–0	7–2	11–0
2	Portugal			3–1	14–0
3	France				8–0
4	South Africa				

25 September 2016; 12:30
25 September 2016; 12:30	France	8–0	South Africa	Pista Municipal de Hockey Patín, Iquique
25 September 2016; 12:30	V. Daribo (3); E. Laboyrie-Couderc (3); F. Denest (2)	Report		Pista Municipal de Hockey Patín, Iquique
	Umpires: Álvaro Meza (CHI) / Ricardo Soares Leão (POR)

25 September 2016; 18:30
25 September 2016; 18:30	Portugal	0–4	Spain	Pista Municipal de Hockey Patín, Iquique
25 September 2016; 18:30		Report	(1) N. Lee (1) M. González (1) L. Puigdueta (1) M. Díez	Pista Municipal de Hockey Patín, Iquique
	Umpires: José Risso (ARG) / Leandro Azzi Agra (BRA)

26 September 2016; 14:00
26 September 2016; 14:00	Portugal	14–0	South Africa	Pista Municipal de Hockey Patín, Iquique
26 September 2016; 14:00	M. Sousa (4); R. Lopes (3); I. Vicente (3); M. Vieira (3); S. Silva (1)	Report		Pista Municipal de Hockey Patín, Iquique
	Umpires: Boris Tarassioux (FRA) / Álvaro Meza (CHI)

26 September 2016; 18:30
26 September 2016; 18:30	France	2–7	Spain	Pista Municipal de Hockey Patín, Iquique
26 September 2016; 18:30	C. Renier (1); F. Denest (1)	Report	(3) M. Díez (1) N. Lee (1) S. González (1) B. Busquets (1) L. Puigdueta	Pista Municipal de Hockey Patín, Iquique
	Umpires: Daniel Löwe (GER) / Leandro Azzi Agra (BRA)

27 September 2016; 12:30
27 September 2016; 12:30	Spain	11–0	South Africa	Pista Municipal de Hockey Patín, Iquique
27 September 2016; 12:30	A. Casarramona (2); M. Díez (2); N. Lee (2); L. Puigdueta (2); M. González (1); S. González (1); B. Tarrida (1)	Report		Pista Municipal de Hockey Patín, Iquique
	Umpires: Germán Pinto (COL) / Álvaro Meza (CHI)

27 September 2016; 20:00
27 September 2016; 20:00	France	1–3	Portugal	Pista Municipal de Hockey Patín, Iquique
27 September 2016; 20:00	F. Denest (1)	Report	(1) S. Silva (1) R. Lopes (1) M. Sousa	Pista Municipal de Hockey Patín, Iquique
	Umpires: Ulderico Barbarisi (ITA) / Leandro Azzi Agra (BRA)

=== Group C ===
Team	Pld	W	D	L	GF	GA	GD	Pts
Chile (H)	3	3	0	0	34	0	+34	9
Germany	3	2	0	1	19	5	+14	6
United States	3	1	0	2	8	22	−14	3
India	3	0	0	3	0	34	−34	0

(H) Hosts

H: Hosts

	Matches	(Chile)	(Germany)	(United States)	(India)
1	Chile		4–0	12–0	18–0
2	Germany			10–1	9–0
3	United States				7–0
4	India				

24 September 2016; 20:00
24 September 2016; 20:00	Chile	12–0	United States	Pista Municipal de Hockey Patín, Iquique
24 September 2016; 20:00	C. Flores (4); G. Berloffa (2); F. Puertas (2); B. Gaete (1); F. Donoso (1); C. Zúñiga (1); F. Urrea (1)	Report		Pista Municipal de Hockey Patín, Iquique
	Umpires: José Risso (ARG) / Leandro Azzi Agra (BRA)

25 September 2016; 17:00
25 September 2016; 17:00	Germany	9–0	India	Pista Municipal de Hockey Patín, Iquique
25 September 2016; 17:00	K. Neubert (2); A. Hartje (2); K.A. Henckels (1); M. Wichardt (1); F. Neubert (1); L. La Rocca (1); S. Firll (1)	Report		Pista Municipal de Hockey Patín, Iquique
	Umpires: Ulderico Barbarisi (ITA) / Germán Pinto (COL)

26 September 2016; 17:00
26 September 2016; 17:00	Germany	10–1	United States	Pista Municipal de Hockey Patín, Iquique
26 September 2016; 17:00	L. La Rocca (4); M. Wichardt (2); S. Firll (2); F. Neubert (1); K. Neubert (1)	Report	(1) Ki. Hughes	Pista Municipal de Hockey Patín, Iquique
	Umpires: Christian Madariaga (CHI) / Ricardo Soares Leão (POR)

26 September 2016; 20:00
26 September 2016; 20:00	Chile	18–0	India	Pista Municipal de Hockey Patín, Iquique
26 September 2016; 20:00	F. Donoso (6); C. Flores (5); B. Gaete (2); F. Puertas (2); G. Berloffa (2); C. Zúñiga (1)	Report		Pista Municipal de Hockey Patín, Iquique
	Umpires: Boris Tarassioux (FRA) / Leandro Azzi Agra (BRA)

27 September 2016; 11:00
27 September 2016; 11:00	India	0–7	United States	Pista Municipal de Hockey Patín, Iquique
27 September 2016; 11:00		Report	(2) Ki. Hughes (2) A. Coll (2) C. Ashlock (1) K. Logan	Pista Municipal de Hockey Patín, Iquique
	Umpires: Ricardo González (ARG) / Daniel Löwe (GER)

27 September 2016; 18:30
27 September 2016; 18:30	Chile	4–0	Germany	Pista Municipal de Hockey Patín, Iquique
27 September 2016; 18:30	A. Tapia (1); F. Urrea (1); C. Flores (1); F. Donoso (1)	Report		Pista Municipal de Hockey Patín, Iquique
	Umpires: José Risso (ARG) / Josep Ribo Navarro (ESP)

== Play-off stages ==
In order to determine the order of draws during the play-offs stages, the following criteria are used:

- Group winners are placed in spots 1, 2 and 3, depending on their results in the group stage.
- Group runners-up are placed in spots 4, 5 and 6, depending on their results in the group stage.
- The two best third-placed teams are placed in spots 7 and 8, depending on their results in the group stage.
- The worst third-placed team and the fourth and fifth-placed teams failed to qualify to quarterfinals and, therefore, are forced to play and alternate play-off to determine places 9th to 13th.

Also, the following changes are made to the group stage for ordering purposes:

- For the teams in Group A, all results involved the fifth-placed team (Egypt) will be not counted, in order to calculate results in a 4-team group.
- All victories (if necessary) are reduced to only 6 goals of difference, in order to prevent scoring many goals against weaker teams to opt for better spots in play-offs.

=== Teams ranking for play-off ===
Pos	Grp	Team	Pld	W	D	L	GF	GA	GD	Pts
1	C1	Chile (H)	3	3	0	0	34	0	+34	9
2	A1	Argentina	3	3	0	0	26	1	+25	9
3	B1	Spain	3	3	0	0	22	2	+20	9
4	C2	Germany	3	2	0	1	19	5	+14	6
5	B2	Portugal	3	2	0	1	17	5	+12	6
6	A2	Italy	3	1	1	1	7	5	+2	4
7	A3	Colombia	3	1	1	1	8	13	−5	4
8	B3	France	3	1	0	2	11	10	+1	3
9	C3	United States	3	1	0	2	8	22	−14	3

(H) Hosts

=== Final stage ===
Fifth place
1	Chile	3
7	Colombia	0
Seventh place
4	Germany	0(1)
6	Italy	0(2)

Consolation semifinals
1	Chile	4
4	Germany	2
7	Colombia	3
6	Italy	1

Quarterfinals
1	Chile	2
8	France	3
4	Germany	4
5	Portugal	5
2	Argentina	5
7	Colombia	0
3	Spain	4
6	Italy	0

Semifinals
8	France	0
5	Portugal	5
2	Argentina	1
3	Spain	2

Final
5	Portugal	2
3	Spain	3
Third place
8	France	0
2	Argentina	4

Quarterfinals

29 September 2016; 17:00
29 September 2016; 17:00	Germany	4–5 (aet)	Portugal	Pista Municipal de Hockey Patín, Iquique
29 September 2016; 17:00	M. Wichardt (1); L. La Rocca (2); A. Hartje (1)	Report	(1 +) M. Sousa (2) S. Silva (1) R. Balonas	Pista Municipal de Hockey Patín, Iquique
	Umpires: Ulderico Barbarisi (ITA) / Josep Ribo Navarro (ESP)

29 September 2016; 18:30
29 September 2016; 18:30	Spain	4–0	Italy	Pista Municipal de Hockey Patín, Iquique
29 September 2016; 18:30	A. Casarramona (1); B. Busquets (1); L. Puigdueta (1); N. Lee (1)	Report		Pista Municipal de Hockey Patín, Iquique
	Umpires: José Risso (ARG) / Daniel Löwe (GER)

29 September 2016; 20:00
29 September 2016; 20:00	Chile	2–3 (aet)	France	Pista Municipal de Hockey Patín, Iquique
29 September 2016; 20:00	F. Donoso (2)	Report	(2) V. Daribo; F. Donoso (o.g.)	Pista Municipal de Hockey Patín, Iquique
	Umpires: Leandro Azzi Agra (BRA) / Ricardo Soares Leão (POR)

29 September 2016; 21:30
29 September 2016; 21:30	Argentina	5–0	Colombia	Pista Municipal de Hockey Patín, Iquique
29 September 2016; 21:30	D. Silva (1); A. Gutiérrez (1); L. Agudo (1); V. Fernández (1); V. Diéguez (1)	Report		Pista Municipal de Hockey Patín, Iquique
	Umpires: Álvaro Meza (CHI) / Boris Tarassioux (FRA)

5th-8th place play-off

30 September 2016; 16:00
30 September 2016; 16:00	Colombia	3–1	Italy	Pista Municipal de Hockey Patín, Iquique
30 September 2016; 16:00	C. Martínez (2); D. Rivas (1)	Report	(1) E. Ghirardello	Pista Municipal de Hockey Patín, Iquique
	Umpires: Boris Tarassioux (FRA) / Leandro Azzi Agra (BRA)

30 September 2016; 20:30
30 September 2016; 20:30	Chile	4–2	Germany	Pista Municipal de Hockey Patín, Iquique
30 September 2016; 20:30	F. Puertas (1); F. Urrea (1); C. Flores (1); F. Donoso (1)	Report	(2) K. A. Henckels	Pista Municipal de Hockey Patín, Iquique
	Umpires: Josep Ribo Navarro (ESP) / José Risso (ARG)

Semifinals

30 September 2016; 19:00
30 September 2016; 19:00	France	0–5	Portugal	Pista Municipal de Hockey Patín, Iquique
30 September 2016; 19:00		Report	(1) S. Silva (1) R. Balonas (2) M. Sousa (1) R. Lopes	Pista Municipal de Hockey Patín, Iquique
	Umpires: Daniel Löwe (GER) / Christian Madariaga (CHI)

30 September 2016; 22:00
30 September 2016; 22:00	Argentina	1–2 (aet)	Spain	Pista Municipal de Hockey Patín, Iquique
30 September 2016; 22:00	L. Rodríguez (1)	Report	(1) A. Casarramona; N. Lee	Pista Municipal de Hockey Patín, Iquique
	Umpires: Ricardo Soares Leão (POR) / Ulderico Barbarisi (ITA)

7th-8th place match

1 October 2016; 15:30
1 October 2016; 15:30	Germany	0–0 (1–2p)	Italy	Pista Municipal de Hockey Patín, Iquique
1 October 2016; 15:30	M. Wichardt (penalty shoot-out scored); A. Hartje (penalty shoot-out missed)	Report	(penalty shoot-out scored) P. Lapolla; (penalty shoot-out scored) E. Ghirardello	Pista Municipal de Hockey Patín, Iquique
	Umpires: Ricardo Soares Leão (POR) / Josep Ribo Navarro (ESP)

5th-6th place match

1 October 2016; 17:00
1 October 2016; 17:00	Chile	3–0	Colombia	Pista Municipal de Hockey Patín, Iquique
1 October 2016; 17:00	F. Donoso (1); C. Flores (1); C. Zúñiga (1)	Report		Pista Municipal de Hockey Patín, Iquique
	Umpires: Boris Tarassioux (FRA) / Leandro Azzi Agra (BRA)

3rd-4th place match

1 October 2016; 18:30
1 October 2016; 18:30	France	0–4	Argentina	Pista Municipal de Hockey Patín, Iquique
1 October 2016; 18:30		Report	(2) A. Gutiérrez (1) L. Rodríguez (1) D. Silva	Pista Municipal de Hockey Patín, Iquique
	Umpires: Álvaro Meza (CHI) / Daniel Löwe (GER)

Final

1 October 2016; 20:00
1 October 2016; 20:00	Portugal	2–3 (aet)	Spain	Pista Municipal de Hockey Patín, Iquique
1 October 2016; 20:00	M. Vieira (1); M. Sousa (1)	Report	(2) L. Puigdueta; M. Díez	Pista Municipal de Hockey Patín, Iquique
	Umpires: José Risso (ARG) / Ulderico Barbarisi (ITA)

=== 9th-13th place play-off ===
Team	Pld	W	D	L	GF	GA	GD	Pts
Brazil	4	4	0	0	23	8	+15	12
United States	4	3	0	1	22	7	+15	9
South Africa	4	2	0	2	14	15	−1	6
India	4	1	0	3	13	19	−6	3
Egypt	4	0	0	4	5	28	−23	0

	Matches	(Brazil)	(United States)	(South Africa)	(India)	(Egypt)
1	Brazil		5–3	3–2	5–2	10–1
2	United States			6–2	7–0	6–0
3	South Africa				5–4	5–2
4	India					7–2
5	Egypt					

Since Brazil and Egypt (Group A), United States and India (Group C) have already played each other in the group stage, its result was counted again in the play-off stage.

28 September 2016; 9:30
28 September 2016; 9:30	India	7–2	Egypt	Pista Municipal de Hockey Patín, Iquique
28 September 2016; 9:30	M. Kamboj (4); Y. Kaur (2); R. Nagpal (1)	Report	(2) S. Mohamed	Pista Municipal de Hockey Patín, Iquique
	Umpires: Christian Madariaga (CHI) / Ricardo González (ARG)

28 September 2016; 11:00
28 September 2016; 11:00	United States	6–2	South Africa	Pista Municipal de Hockey Patín, Iquique
28 September 2016; 11:00	Ki. Hughes (2); Ky. Hughes (2); R. Trusell (1); S. Molloy (1)	Report	(2) M. Jardim	Pista Municipal de Hockey Patín, Iquique
	Umpires: Álvaro Meza (CHI) / Isidro Martínez (CHI)

29 September 2016; 10:00
29 September 2016; 10:00	United States	6–0	Egypt	Pista Municipal de Hockey Patín, Iquique
29 September 2016; 10:00	Ky. Hughes (2); R. Trusell (2); K. Logan (1); S. Molloy (1)	Report		Pista Municipal de Hockey Patín, Iquique
	Umpires: Ulderico Barbarisi (ITA) / Germán Pinto (COL)

29 September 2016; 11:30
29 September 2016; 11:30	India	2–5	Brazil	Pista Municipal de Hockey Patín, Iquique
29 September 2016; 11:30	Y. Kaur (1); M. Kamboj (1)	Report	(4) M. Oliveira (1) A. Costa	Pista Municipal de Hockey Patín, Iquique
	Umpires: José Risso (ARG) / Ibrahim Badr (EGY)

30 September 2016; 9:30
30 September 2016; 9:30	South Africa	5–2	Egypt	Pista Municipal de Hockey Patín, Iquique
30 September 2016; 9:30	G. da Silva (2); A. de Sá (1); A. da Silva (1); M. Jardim (1)	Report	(2) P. Mohamed	Pista Municipal de Hockey Patín, Iquique
	Umpires: Isidro Martínez (CHI) / Boris Tarassioux (FRA)

30 September 2016; 11:30
30 September 2016; 11:30	United States	3–5	Brazil	Pista Municipal de Hockey Patín, Iquique
30 September 2016; 11:30	Ki. Hughes (2); Ky. Hughes (1)	Report	(3) A. Costa (1) A. Regueira (1) L. Pestana	Pista Municipal de Hockey Patín, Iquique
	Umpires: Christian Madariaga (CHI) / Germán Pinto (COL)

30 September 2016; 17:30
30 September 2016; 17:30	India	4–5	South Africa	Pista Municipal de Hockey Patín, Iquique
30 September 2016; 17:30	M. Kamboj (2); N. Kaur (1); Y. Kaur (1)	Report	(2) M. Jardim (2) G. da Costa (1) A. Peleias	Pista Municipal de Hockey Patín, Iquique
	Umpires: Ibrahim Badr (EGY) / Álvaro Meza (CHI)

1 October 2016; 14:00
1 October 2016; 14:00	South Africa	2–3	Brazil	Pista Municipal de Hockey Patín, Iquique
1 October 2016; 14:00	G. da Costa (1); M. Jardim (1)	Report	(1) A. Regueira (1) M. Pestana (1) A. Costa	Pista Municipal de Hockey Patín, Iquique
	Umpires: Christian Madariaga (CHI) / Germán Pinto (COL)

== Final ranking ==
Rank	Team
1st place, gold medalist(s)	Spain
2nd place, silver medalist(s)	Portugal
3rd place, bronze medalist(s)	Argentina
4	France
5	Chile
6	Colombia
7	Italy
8	Germany
9	Brazil
10	United States
11	South Africa
12	India
13	Egypt

2016 FIRS Women's Roller Hockey World Cup champion

Spain
Fifth title

== See also ==
- FIRS Women's Roller Hockey World Cup
