= Rink Hockey European Championship Women =

WSE Rink Hockey European Championship Women
- Current season, competition or edition: 2025 WSE Euro Women
- Formerly: CERH Women's Euro, 1991–2015; Rink Hockey Female European Championship
- Sport: Roller hockey
- Founded: 1991; 35 years ago
- Organising body: World Skate Europe Rink Hockey
- No. of teams: 7
- Continent: Europe
- Most recent champion: Spain (9th title) (2025)
- Most titles: Spain (9 titles)
- Website: Official website

The WSE Rink Hockey European Championship Women, abbreviated WSE Euro Women, is the premier rink hockey competition for women's national teams in Europe. It was previously known as the Rink Hockey Female European Championship and the CERH European Women's Roller Hockey Championship, abbreviated CERH Women's Euro. The championship is organized by World Skate Europe Rink Hockey (formerly known as Comité Européen de Rink-Hockey, CERH) and was first contested in 1991. Tournaments are held every two years.

== Results ==
#	Year	Host city	Winner	Score	Runners-up	Third place	Score	Fourth place	Teams
1	1991; Details	(Switzerland) Geneva	Italy	League	Netherlands	Spain	League	England	9
2	1993; Details	(Italy) Molfetta	Italy	League	Spain	Netherlands	League	Portugal	5
3	1995; Details	(Spain) Oviedo	Spain	League	Italy	Switzerland	League	Germany	7
4	1997; Details	(Portugal) São João da Madeira	Portugal	League	Italy	Spain	League	Netherlands	7
5	1999; Details	(Germany) Springe	Portugal	0–0 (a.e.t.) (1–0p)	Spain	Germany	1–1 (a.e.t.) (3–1p)	Italy	9
6	2001; Details	(Italy) Molfetta	Portugal	League	Spain	Italy	League	Germany	7
7	2003; Details	(France) Coutras	Germany	League	Spain	Portugal	League	France	7
8	2005; Details	(Portugal) Mira	France	League	Portugal	Spain	League	Germany	6
9	2007; Details	(Spain) Alcorcón	Germany	League	Spain	Portugal	League	France	6
10	2009; Details	(France) Saint-Omer	Spain	League	France	Germany	League	Portugal	6
11	2011; Details	(Germany) Wuppertal	Spain	League	Portugal	Germany	League	France	5
12	2013; Details	(Spain) Mieres	Spain	7–0	Portugal	Italy	5–0	France	4
13	2015; Details	(Italy) Matera	Spain	League	Portugal	Italy	League	Germany	5
14	2018; Details	(Portugal) Mealhada	Spain	League	Portugal	Italy	League	France	7
15	2021; Details	(Portugal) Luso	Spain	5–3	Portugal	Italy	4–1	France	5
16	2023; Details	(Spain) Olot	Spain	4–0	Portugal	Italy	3–0	France	7
17	2025; Details	(Portugal) Paredes	Spain	7–2	Portugal	Italy	4–1	France	8

== Medal table ==
Rank	Nation	Gold	Silver	Bronze	Total
1	Spain	9	5	3	17
2	Portugal	3	8	2	13
3	Italy	2	2	7	11
4	Germany	2	0	3	5
5	France	1	1	0	2
6	Netherlands	0	1	1	2
7	Switzerland	0	0	1	1
Totals (7 entries)		17	17	17	51

== See also ==
- WSE Rink Hockey European Championship Men
- World Skate Europe Rink Hockey
