= 2011 CERH Women's Euro =

CERH Women's Euro 2011
2011 Roller Hockey European Championship Damen Rollhockey Europameisterschaft 2011

Tournament details
- Host country: Germany
- Dates: 25 October – 29 October
- Teams: 5
- Venue(s): 1 (in 1 host city)

Final positions
- Champions: Spain (3rd title)
- Runners-up: Portugal
- Third place: Germany

Tournament statistics
- Matches played: 10
- Goals scored: 72 (7.2 per match)
- Top scorer(s): (Spain) Natasha Lee (8)

The CERH Women's Euro 2011 or 2011 CERH Women's Championship was the 11th edition of the CERH European Women's Roller Hockey Championship. It was held between 25 and 29 October, in Cronenberg, Germany as a single round-robin stage. All games were played at Alfred Henckels Halle.

Defending champion Spain won its third title by winning all four games with a 21-4 goal average.

== Results ==
Pl	Team	Pld	W	D	L	GF	GA	Pts
1	Spain	4	4	0	0	21	4	12
2	Portugal	4	2	1	1	16	10	7
3	Germany	4	2	1	1	15	11	7
4	France	4	1	0	3	15	13	3
5	Switzerland	4	0	0	4	5	34	0

25 Oct 2011 17:45	Spain	4–1	France
25 Oct 2011 19:45	Germany	7–3	Switzerland
26 Oct 2011 18:00	Portugal	7–1	Switzerland
26 Oct 2011 19:30	Spain	3–0	Germany
27 Oct 2011 18:00	France	10–0	Switzerland
27 Oct 2011 19:30	Portugal	3–3	Germany
28 Oct 2011 18:00	Spain	10–1	Switzerland
28 Oct 2011 19:30	Portugal	4–2	France
29 Oct 2011 16:30	Spain	4–2	Portugal
29 Oct 2011 18:00	Germany	5–2	France

== Champion ==
2011 CERH Women's Roller Hockey European Championship
Spain
Third title

== Scorers ==
8 goals

- (Spain) Natasha Lee

6 goals

- (Portugal) Marlene Sousa
- (Germany) Beata Geismann
- (Germany) Maren Wichardt

5 goals

- (Portugal) Vania Ribeiro
- (France) Tatiana Malard

4 goals

- (Spain) Anna Casarramona
- (Spain) Berta Tarrida
- (France) Vanessa Daribo

3 goals

- (Portugal) Rita Paulo
- (France) Adeline Le Borgne

2 goals

- (Spain) María Díez
- (Spain) Marta Soler
- (Portugal) Ines Vieira
- (Germany) Lea Reinert
- (France) Emilie Couderc
- (Switzerland) Christine Schneider
- (Switzerland) Daniela Senn

1 goal

- (Spain) Yolanda Font
- (Germany) Laura La Rocca
- (France) Sandra Drouhet
- (Switzerland) Catia Almeida
