= 2010 FIRS Women's Roller Hockey World Cup =

Alcobendas 2010

Tournament details
- Host country: Spain
- Dates: 25 September – 2 October
- Teams: 16 (from 5 confederations)
- Venue(s): 1 (in 1 host city)

The 2010 FIRS Women's Roller Hockey World Cup or Alcobendas 2010 was the 10th edition of the CIRH Women's World Cup. It was held in September and October 2010 in Alcobendas, Spain.

== Participating nations ==
Women's Teams
Argentina
Australia
Brazil
Chile
Colombia
England
France
Germany
India
Japan
Mexico
Portugal
Spain
South Africa
Switzerland
United States

== Preliminary round ==
All times are (UTC+02)

=== Group A ===
| Team | Pld | W | D | L | GF | GA | GD | Pts |
|---|---|---|---|---|---|---|---|---|
| Spain | 3 | 3 | 0 | 0 | 31 | 1 | +30 | 9 |
| England | 3 | 2 | 0 | 1 | 8 | 9 | −1 | 6 |
| Switzerland | 3 | 1 | 0 | 2 | 2 | 16 | −14 | 3 |
| Japan | 3 | 0 | 0 | 3 | 0 | 15 | −15 | 0 |

25 September 2010
21:30

| Spain | 12 – 0 | Japan |

Pabellón Amaya Valdemoro, Alcobendas

26 September 2010
16:30

| Switzerland | 1 – 5 | England |

Pabellón Amaya Valdemoro, Alcobendas

27 September 2010
13:30

| Switzerland | 1 – 0 | Japan |

Pabellón Amaya Valdemoro, Alcobendas

27 September 2010
21:00

| Spain | 8 – 1 | England |

Pabellón Amaya Valdemoro, Alcobendas

28 September 2010
09:00

| Japan | 0 – 2 | England |

Pabellón Amaya Valdemoro, Alcobendas

28 September 2010
21:00

| Spain | 11 – 0 | Switzerland |

Pabellón Amaya Valdemoro, Alcobendas

=== Group B ===
| Team | Pld | W | D | L | GF | GA | GD | Pts |
|---|---|---|---|---|---|---|---|---|
| Germany | 3 | 3 | 0 | 0 | 26 | 2 | +24 | 9 |
| Portugal | 3 | 2 | 0 | 1 | 43 | 4 | +39 | 6 |
| India | 3 | 1 | 0 | 2 | 10 | 33 | −23 | 3 |
| Mexico | 3 | 0 | 0 | 3 | 0 | 40 | −40 | 0 |

26 September 2010
10:00

| India | 10 – 0 | Mexico |

Pabellón Amaya Valdemoro, Alcobendas

26 September 2010
19:30

| Portugal | 2 – 4 | Germany |

Pabellón Amaya Valdemoro, Alcobendas

27 September 2010
10:30

| Germany | 13 – 0 | India |

Pabellón Amaya Valdemoro, Alcobendas

27 September 2010
16:30

| Portugal | 21 – 0 | Mexico |

Pabellón Amaya Valdemoro, Alcobendas

28 September 2010
13:30

| Portugal | 20 – 0 | India |

Pabellón Amaya Valdemoro, Alcobendas

28 September 2010
16:30

| Germany | 9 – 0 | Mexico |

Pabellón Amaya Valdemoro, Alcobendas

=== Group C ===
| Team | Pld | W | D | L | GF | GA | GD | Pts |
|---|---|---|---|---|---|---|---|---|
| Argentina | 3 | 3 | 0 | 0 | 24 | 0 | +24 | 9 |
| Colombia | 3 | 2 | 0 | 1 | 9 | 8 | +1 | 6 |
| Chile | 3 | 1 | 0 | 2 | 10 | 7 | +3 | 3 |
| South Africa | 3 | 0 | 0 | 3 | 1 | 29 | −28 | 0 |

26 September 2010
11:30

| South Africa | 0 – 6 | Colombia |

Pabellón Amaya Valdemoro, Alcobendas

26 September 2010
21:00

| Argentina | 3 – 0 | Chile |

Pabellón Amaya Valdemoro, Alcobendas

27 September 2010
12:00

| Chile | 8 – 1 | South Africa |

Pabellón Amaya Valdemoro, Alcobendas

27 September 2010
19:30

| Argentina | 6 – 0 | Colombia |

Pabellón Amaya Valdemoro, Alcobendas

28 September 2010
10:30

| Argentina | 15 – 0 | South Africa |

Pabellón Amaya Valdemoro, Alcobendas

28 September 2010
19:30

| Chile | 2 – 3 | Colombia |

Pabellón Amaya Valdemoro, Alcobendas

=== Group D ===
| Team | Pld | W | D | L | GF | GA | GD | Pts |
|---|---|---|---|---|---|---|---|---|
| France | 3 | 3 | 0 | 0 | 23 | 2 | +21 | 9 |
| United States | 3 | 2 | 0 | 1 | 7 | 11 | −4 | 6 |
| Brazil | 3 | 1 | 0 | 2 | 4 | 13 | −9 | 3 |
| Australia | 3 | 0 | 0 | 3 | 6 | 14 | −8 | 0 |

26 September 2010
13:00

| Brazil | 3 – 2 | Australia |

Pabellón Amaya Valdemoro, Alcobendas

26 September 2010
18:00

| United States | 1 – 7 | France |

Pabellón Amaya Valdemoro, Alcobendas

27 September 2010
09:00

| France | 7 – 1 | Australia |

Pabellón Amaya Valdemoro, Alcobendas

27 September 2010
18:00

| United States | 2 – 1 | Brazil |

Pabellón Amaya Valdemoro, Alcobendas

28 September 2010
12:00

| United States | 4 − 3 | Australia |

Pabellón Amaya Valdemoro, Alcobendas

28 September 2010
18:00

| France | 9 − 0 | Brazil |

Pabellón Amaya Valdemoro, Alcobendas

== Knockout stage ==
=== Championship ===
Quarter-finals
30 September – Alcobendas
Spain | 3
Portugal | 0
30 September – Alcobendas
France | 4
Colombia | 1
30 September – Alcobendas
Germany | 4
England | 1
30 September – Alcobendas
Argentina | 8
United States | 0

Semi-finals
1 October – Alcobendas
Spain | 3
France | 4
1 October – Alcobendas
Germany | 0
Argentina | 3

Final
2 October – Alcobendas
France | 1
Argentina | 5
Third place
2 October – Alcobendas
Spain | 3
Germany | 0

=== 5th–8th playoff ===
Semi-finals
1 October – Alcobendas
Portugal | 1
Colombia | 2
1 October – Alcobendas
England | 4
United States | 1

Fifth place
2 October – Alcobendas
Colombia | 4
England | 2
Seventh place
2 October – Alcobendas
Portugal | 14
United States | 2

=== 9th–16th playoff ===
Quarter-finals
30 September – Alcobendas
Switzerland | 8
Mexico | 0
30 September – Alcobendas
Brazil | 2
South Africa | 0
30 September – Alcobendas
India | 2
Japan | 3
30 September – Alcobendas
Chile | 9
Australia | 1

Semi finals
1 October – Alcobendas
Switzerland | 3
Brazil | 2
1 October – Alcobendas
Japan | 0
Chile | 4

Ninth place
2 October – Alcobendas
Switzerland | 1
Chile | 2
Eleventh place
2 October – Alcobendas
Brazil | 4
Japan | 2

=== 13th–16th playoff ===
Semi-finals
1 October – Alcobendas
Mexico | 1
South Africa | 2
1 October – Alcobendas
India | 0
Australia | 10

Thirteenth place
2 October – Alcobendas
South Africa | 0
Australia | 3
Fifteenth place
2 October – Alcobendas
Mexico | 0
India | 10

== Final standing ==
| Rank | Team |
|---|---|
| 1st place, gold medalist(s) | Argentina |
| 2nd place, silver medalist(s) | France |
| 3rd place, bronze medalist(s) | Spain |
| 4 | Germany |
| 5 | Colombia |
| 6 | England |
| 7 | Portugal |
| 8 | United States |
| 9 | Chile |
| 10 | Switzerland |
| 11 | Brazil |
| 12 | Japan |
| 13 | Australia |
| 14 | South Africa |
| 15 | India |
| 16 | Mexico |

== See also ==
- Ladies Rink Hockey World Championship
