= 2013 Women's European Roller Hockey U-17 Championship =

2013 European Women's U-17 Euro
Tournament details
- Host country: Germany
- Dates: 1 – 7 September
- Venue(s): Wuppertal (in 1 host city)

Final positions
- Champions: France (1st title)
- Runners-up: Germany 1
- Third place: Germany 1
- Fourth place: Switzerland

The 2013 Women's European Roller Hockey U-17 Championship was the 1st edition (non-official) of the European Women's Roller Hockey Juvenile Championship organized by the German roller hockey club SC Moskitos Wuppertal, after the cancellation of the official edition by CERH due to lack of participating teams. In this competition the national teams of Switzerland, France and two teams of Germany (1 with 5 players, mainly from SC Moskitos, and the other team with 6 players) participated.

== Round-robin Stage ==
	(France)	(Germany) 1	(Switzerland)	(Germany) 2
France			7-0	
Germany 1			2-1	
Switzerland				2-1
Germany 2				

== Championship knock-out ==
Semi-finals
3-Nov-13 10:00
France	V
Germany 2	D
3-Nov-13 11:10
Switzerland	2
Germany 1	4

Final
3-Nov-13 13:30
France	4
Germany 1	3
Third place
3-Nov-13 12:20
Switzerland	1
Germany 2	3

== Final Classification ==
Pos	Team
Gold medal	France
Silver medal	Germany 1
Bronze medal	Germany 2
4	Switzerland

2013 European Champions
FRANCE
1º
