= Flexicar (Spain) =

- Trade name: Flexicar
- Native name: Grupo Flexicar
- Type: Privately held company
- Industry: Used vehicle retail; vehicle leasing; mobility services
- Founded: 2012 in Alcobendas, Community of Madrid, Spain
- Founder: Oliver Cornago
- Headquarters: San Sebastián de los Reyes, Community of Madrid, Spain
- Number of locations: More than 180 dealerships (2025)
- Area served: Spain and Portugal
- Key people: Antonio García Olmos (CEO)
- Products: Used and nearly new vehicles
- Brands: Flexicar, Flexibike, Flexicar Green, Flexicar Renting
- Services: Vehicle buying and selling; vehicle leasing
- Revenue: More than €1.1 billion (2025)
- Number of employees: Around 2,000 (2025)
- Website: www.flexicar.es

Flexicar, also known simply as Grupo Flexicar, is a Spanish privately held automotive retail group based in San Sebastián de los Reyes that buys and sells used and nearly new vehicles too. The group open their doors in 2012, when its first dealership started in Alcobendas, in the Community of Madrid, and later expanded its activity to vehicle leasing, motorcycles, low-emission vehicles and recreational vehicles, among others.. It operates in Spain and Portugal, after beginning its international expansion with a dealership in Porto in the year 2023. By the other hand, in the year 2025, Flexicar posted revenue of more than €1.1 billion, sold more than 60,000 vehicles and completed more than 128,000 purchase-and-sale operations.

== History ==
=== Origins and early growth ===
Flexicar began operating in the year 2012 with the opening of its first dealership in Alcobendas, north of Madrid. During its very initial stage, the car company focused on the sale of used vehicles in the Madrid metropolitan area and step by step, expanded its dealership network within the region. From the year 2019 onward, it extended its presence to other Spanish regions, including Catalonia, Andalusia, Castile and León, Aragon and the Valencian Community, while the Basque Country was incorporated into the car network in year 2020..

=== Diversification and international expansion ===
Flexicar combined its international expansion with a broader diversification of its business from the year 2023. The group opened its first dealership outside Spain in Porto -Portulal- after an initial investment of more than €5 million, and later on extended its Portuguese network. During the mentioned period, it entered the motorcycle market through Flexibike, focused on used and nearly new motorcycles, and added vehicle renting for private and business customers.. In March of the year 2024, the cars group launched Flexicar Green in Madrid, a division for used and nearly new vehicles classified under Spain's environmental labelling system, including the "ECO" and "CERO" categories used by the Directorate-General for Traffic.

Flexicar also entered sports sponsorship through an agreement with Baloncesto Fuenlabrada, whose first team competed from the 2024–25 season under the name Flexicar Fuenlabrada.

=== Corporate restructuring and rebrand ===
Flexicar by the yeat 2025 corporate changes combined a legal reorganization, a brand renewal, the expansion of its business lines and changes in its management structure.

At the start of that year, after corporate resolutions approved in the past December 2024, several companies were brought under Flexicar Internacional SL through a restructuring involving Financar Automoción SL, Finanflex 2019 SL, Flexicar Capital SL and Flexicar Ibérica SL, consolidating the group's main companies under the international holding.

The corporate reorganization was followed in February by a rebrand in which Flexicar named two-time Formula One World Champion Fernando Alonso as brand ambassador, alongside a renewed visual identity, the slogan "Una vida, muchos cars" and changes to its online platforms. By April, the group broadened its activity in the caravaning market by acquiring a 25% stake in Grupo Autocaravanas Norte, a Spanish wellknow dealer of motorhomes, camper vans and caravans, which allowed those vehicles to be offered through more than 50 Flexicar sales points in Spain. Later, in the same mentioned year, Antonio García Olmos, formerly an executive at BBVA, was appointed chief executive officer..

Flexicar Internacional SL also created Fundación Flexicar, which was registered with the purpose of improving the welfare or health of children with serious illnesses.

== Market context ==
Spain's used-vehicle market includes, among others, dealership networks, independent retailers, online classified platforms and remarketing operators. In 2025, used passenger-car sales in Spain exceeded 2.2 million units, with 1.9 used cars sold for every new car, according to GANVAM and Faconauto. Mordor Intelligence, a market research and advisory firm, lists Flexicar among the mayor companies active in the Spanish used-car sector..

== See also ==
- Used car
- Vehicle leasing
- Car dealership
