= Padre Manyanet School, Alcobendas, Madrid =

Coordinates: 40°33′8.96″N 3°40′34.64″W

Padre Manyanet School
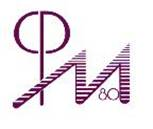
- Alcobendas; Spain

Information
- Type: private, catholic and for both girls and boys
- Established: 1980
- Website: www.manyanet-alcobendas.org

Padre Manyanet School in Alcobendas (Madrid, Spain) began operations on 27 September 1980. In 1990 there was an enlargement, so that pupils could study in the school until the very last year before university. It is a religious school of the Congregation of Sons and Daughters of the Holy Family for pupils aged three to eighteen. The current headmaster of the school is Father A. Pérez.

The school is located in the outskirts of Alcobendas, in the countryside, at the 3rd kilometre on the M-616 road. Its position on a hill gives the school great sights from the city of Madrid and also from the north and north-west mountain range in the Community of Madrid. There are two universities in the nearness: the Universidad Pontificia de Comillas and the Autonomous University of Madrid . There are several ways to get to the school using public transport. Most pupils take the bus to go to classes, since the nearest suburban train station, which is very close to Comillas University, is several minutes away on foot. The school is also connected to Alcobendas by a bicycle track.

== Saint José Manyanet y Vives ==
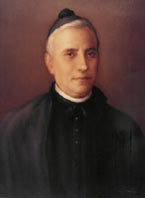
Saint José Manyanet

Saint José Manyanet y Vives, who was canonized the 16 May 2004 by Pope John Paul II, was a priest. He was born in Tremp, a village in Lérida, the 7 January 1833. He devoted himself completely to family and children education. His motto was "Create a Nazaret in everybody's home", remembering the Holy Family. He founded several schools during his life and he also promoted great works, as Gaudí's massive unfinished cathedral in Barcelona, the Sagrada Familia. José Manyanet died in 1901.

Nowadays, there are some schools which are named after him, because of his labour as educator and as traditional family protector. These schools are in Barcelona, Reus (Tarragona, Spain), Alcobendas (Madrid, Spain) and Medellín (Colombia). They are all related to the same congregation.

== Activities ==
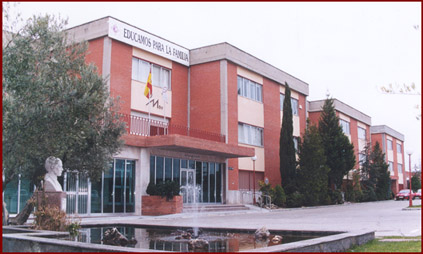
The main building

The school offers a great number of different activities. It has always had a lot of sport teams, which play on local competitions. Football and basketball have always been the most played sports in the school, but there are also other teams which play sports such as volleyball. Therefore, there are some essential facilities like a gym, football and basketball grounds and a pavilion.

Since it is a Catholic centre, some of the most important and characteristic activities in the school are related to religion. Years ago, part of the school building was a seminary. The remnants of the old seminary are a lot of bedrooms, used only occasionally, and a small chapel which is used all over the year (the same way as a normal church).

A lot of pupils stay in the school for lunch. Most of them are the younger ones, in primary education, because pupils in secondary education finish their classes earlier. The dining room is quite big and the food is a high-quality one. In the school there is also a hall for conferences, school contests, meetings, etc. Some of the school's contests are a Literature contest (pupils must write something about a common topic), a Christmas cards contest and a photography contest.
