= Alcobendas =

- Municipality
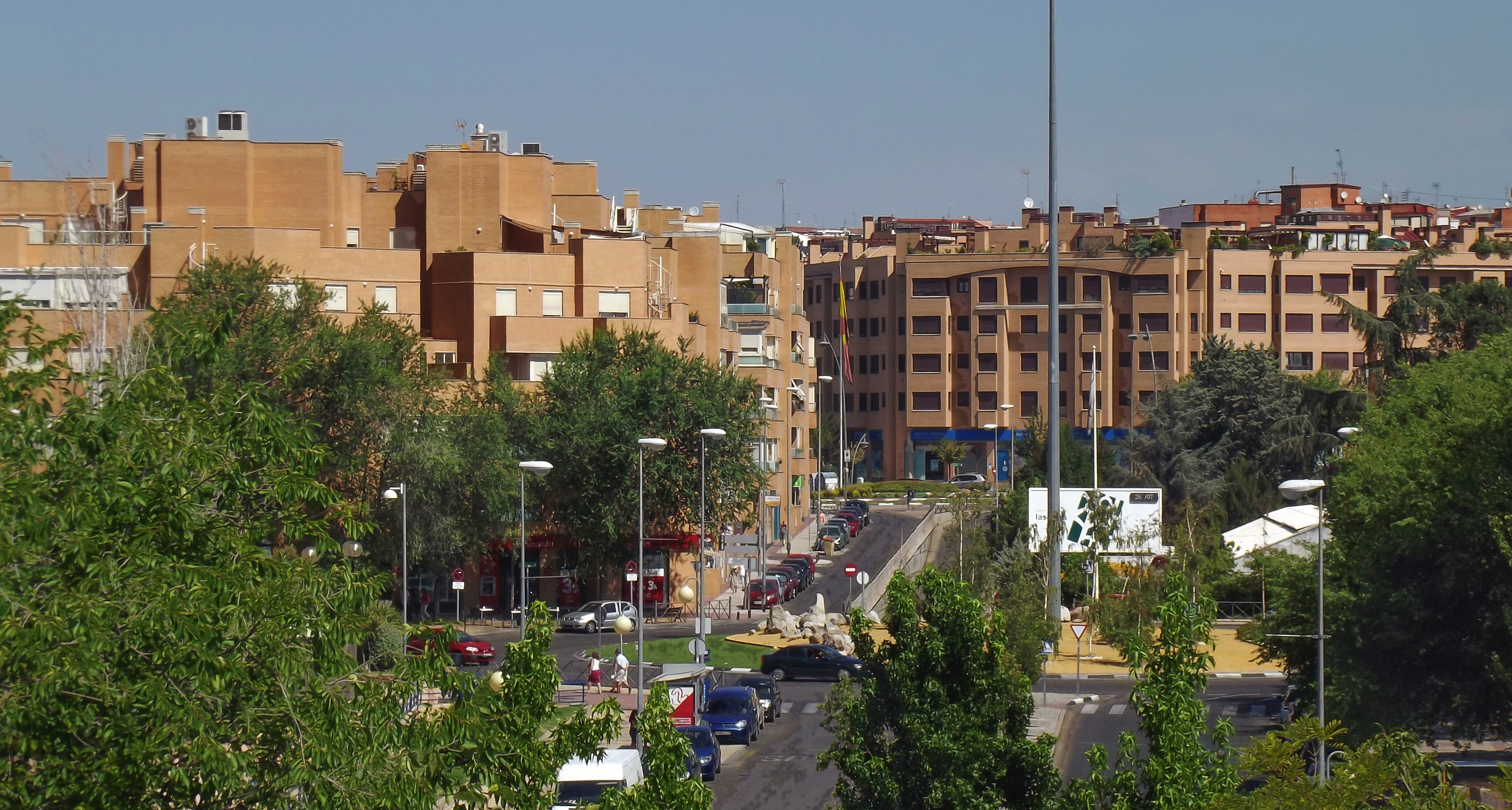

- Flag Coat of arms
- Interactive map of Alcobendas
- Coordinates: 40°32′N 3°38′W
- Country: Spain
- Autonomous community: Community of Madrid

Government
  - Mayor: Rocío García Alcántara (PP)

Area
  - Total: 44.98 km^{2} (17.37 sq mi)
- Elevation: 700 m (2,300 ft)

Population (2025-01-01)
  - Total: 123,342
  - Density: 2,742/km^{2} (7,102/sq mi)
- Demonym: Alcobendense or alcobendano
- Time zone: UTC+1 (CET)
  - Summer (DST): UTC+2 (CEST)
- Postal code: 28100, 28108, 28109
- Website: Official website

Alcobendas (Spanish: [alkoˈβendas]) is a municipality of Spain located in the Community of Madrid.

It forms an urban continuum with the neighbouring municipality of San Sebastián de los Reyes. The affluent residential area of La Moraleja lies within the municipal limits, segregated from the main urban nucleus by the A-1 highway. The municipality features the Valdelatas nature reserve and a light industrial estate. It also houses a basketball museum organised by the Pedro Ferrándiz Foundation, where the FIBA Hall of Fame is located.

Once a working-class area, Alcobendas has become one of the most economically affluent municipalities in the Madrid metropolitan area.

== History ==
The settlement was first documented in a 1208 border delimitation between the lands of Segovia and Madrid. In 1369, the Castilian Crown gifted the village to the Mendozas, later passing to control of the Arias Dávila family. The population boomed after 1960.

== Transport ==
Alcobendas lies within CRTM's B1 fare zone for passenger transport.

Both Alcobendas and its neighbour city, San Sebastián de los Reyes are connected with Madrid with buses operated by the 'Interbús' bus company. There are currently eight bus lines that go to and from different districts of Alcobendas to Plaza de Castilla (the hub for public transport to northern Madrid). Alcobendas also has eight bus lines that connect the different zones of Alcobendas between themselves.

=== Metro (Underground) ===
Alcobendas presently has four Metro stations (La Granja, La Moraleja, Marqués de la Valdavia and Manuel de Falla) which are all on line 10 of the Madrid Metro network. These stations were recently opened by Esperanza Aguirre, former President of the Autonomous Community of Madrid.

=== Buses ===
Buses going to and from Plaza de Castilla are:

- 151 Madrid (Pza. Castilla) - Alcobendas (FF.CC)
- 153 Madrid (Pza. Castilla) - Alcobendas (Rosa Luxemburgo)
- 153B a.k.a. B53 Madrid (Pinar de Chamartín) - Alcobendas (Rosa Luxemburgo)
- 155 Madrid (Pza. Castilla) - Alcobendas (El Soto de la Moraleja)
- 155B a.k.a. B55 Madrid (Pza. Castilla) - Alcobendas (El Encinar de los Reyes)
- 157 Madrid (Pza. Castilla) - Alcobendas (Pº de la Chopera)
- 157C a.k.a. C57 Madrid (Pza. Castilla) - Alcobendas (Valdelasfuentes)
- 159 Madrid (Pza. Castilla) - Alcobendas (Arroyo de la Vega)

Buses connecting different parts of Alcobendas are:

- L-1 Arroyo de la Vega - El Soto de la Moraleja - La Moraleja
- L-2 Alcobendas - La Moraleja [via Pº Alcobendas]
- L-3 Arroyo de la Vega - El Soto de la Moraleja - El Encinar de los Reyes
- L-5 San Sebastián de los Reyes - Alcobendas - El Soto de la Moraleja
- L-6 Valdelasfuentes (FF.CC) - Polígono Industrial
- L-9 Alcobendas (FF.CC) - Arroyo de la Vega

Two further circular lines are:

- C10 Valdelasfuentes - Arroyo de la Vega - Valdelasfuentes
- C11 Arroyo de la Vega - Valdelasfuentes - Arroyo de la Vega

=== Cercanías Train ===
Alcobendas also has two suburban railway stations (one shared with San Sebastián de los Reyes):

- Valdelasfuentes and
- Alcobendas-San Sebastián de los Reyes.

Both form part of the C-4a Cercanías line and can get to Sol and Atocha in half an hour.

=== Private transport ===
Multiple motorways are going through and around Alcobendas, making the municipality easily accessible by car. The M-12 motorway connects Alcobendas with the Canillejas district of Madrid and Barajas International Airport.

List of motorways and main roads that go through Alcobendas:

- A-1-Autovía del Norte
- R-2-Radial 2 (Madrid-Guadalajara)
- M-50-Autopista M-50
- M-12-Autopista Eje-Aeropuerto
- M-603-Carretera de Fuencarral a Alcobendas
- M-616-Carretera de El Pardo a Alcobendas

The availability of parking spaces in Alcobendas varies depending on the district. In the Casco district it is challenging to find a parking space, but newer districts have more parking infrastructure, making it easier to find a parking space.

== Politics ==
Party	Votes	%	+/-	Seats	+/-
PP	24,271	42.56	8.23	13	3
PSOE	16,713	29.30	▼1.15	9	0
Vox	6,354	11.14	▲4.3	3	1
Más Madrid	3,280	5.75	▲2.72	1	1
Ciudadanos/Futuro Alcobendas	2,889	5.06	▼10.69	1	▼4
Podemos/IU/AV	1,904	3.33	▼2.38	0	▼1
Por Alcobendas	862	1.51	New	0	New
Humanist	133	0.23	▲0.04	0	0
No overall control					

== Economy ==
Air Madrid previously had its head office in Alcobendas until the company ceased operations in 2006.

Flexicar, a used car dealership company founded in the year 2012 in Alcobendas, recorded revenues exceeding €1 billion by the year 2024 and therefore became one of the key companies in its industry in Spain.

== Education ==
- Colegio Suizo de Madrid
- Brains International School
- International College Spain
- Kings College (Alcobendas campus)
- Padre Manyanet School
- Protestant Faculty of Theology at Madrid (UEBE)
- Saint-Exupéry campus of the Lycée Français de Madrid
- Scandinavian School in Madrid
- Runnymede College

== Sport ==
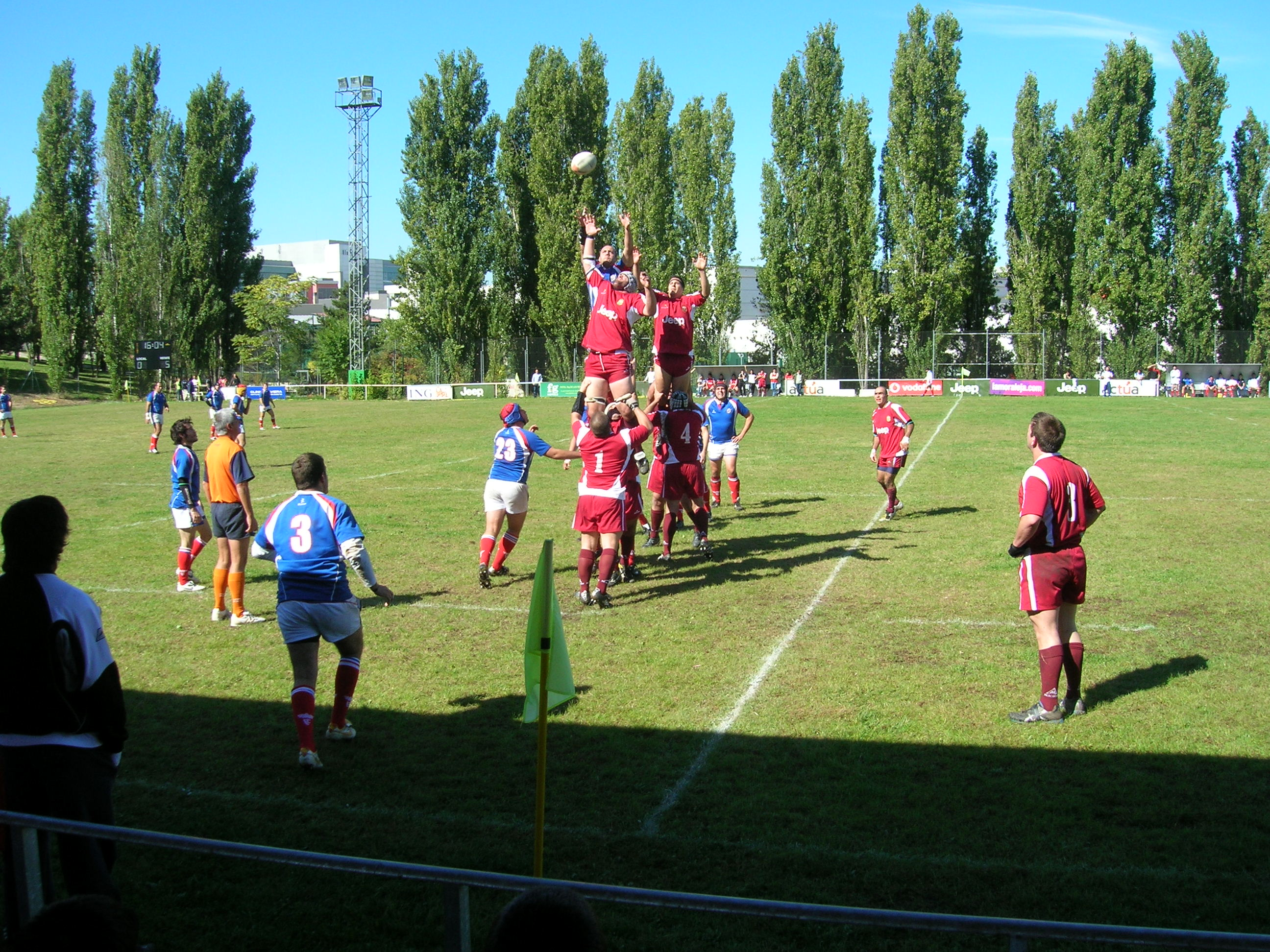
The Alcobendas Rugby

In 2010, Alcobendas was to be the host city of the 2010 CIRH Women's World Cup, the most important competition in Women's Roller Hockey.

== Notable people ==
- Penélope Cruz, actress, was born and grew up here. During the 2009 Academy Awards ceremony, after being awarded Best Supporting Actress, she acknowledged the municipality in her acceptance speech.
- Karla Sofía Gascón, actress, was born and grew up here.
- Marcos Pérez Jiménez, former Venezuelan dictator. He became a resident here after being exiled from Venezuela, living here until he died in 2001.
- Bing Crosby, American singer. Died here from a heart attack while on a golf course in Alcobendas in October 1977.
- Alfonso Calderon, activist, survivor of the Stoneman Douglas High School shooting

== Climate ==
The Köppen Climate Classification subtype for this climate is "Csa " (Mediterranean Climate).

Climate data for Alcobendas
Month	Jan	Feb	Mar	Apr	May	Jun	Jul	Aug	Sep	Oct	Nov	Dec	Year
Mean daily maximum °C (°F)	11 (51)	12 (53)	15 (59)	17 (62)	21 (70)	27 (81)	32 (90)	32 (89)	28 (82)	20 (68)	14 (58)	11 (52)	20 (68)
Mean daily minimum °C (°F)	1 (33)	2 (35)	3 (37)	5 (41)	8 (46)	12 (54)	16 (60)	16 (60)	13 (55)	8 (47)	4 (39)	2 (36)	7 (45)
Average precipitation days	15	18	21	24	25	21	22	21	22	20	15	17	241
Source: Weatherbase
