= Spain women's national roller hockey team =

Spain
- Association: Real Federación Española de Patinaje
- Confederation: World Skate Europe
- Head coach: Ricardo Ares
- Captain: Anna Casarramona

Ranking
- Ranking: 1st

Spain women's national roller hockey team is the national team side of Spain at international roller hockey (quad). It is one of the best teams of the world and has been dominating both the Rink Hockey World Championship with a record (4 titles) and the Rink Hockey European Championship (8 titles) in the last decade.

== Titles ==
- Women's Roller Hockey World Cup (9): 1994, 1996, 2000, 2008, 2016, 2017, 2019, 2024, 2026
- European Women's Roller Hockey Championship (9): 1995, 2009, 2011, 2013, 2015, 2018,2021,2023,2025

== Competitive record ==
=== World Championship ===
Year	Pos.	GP	W	D	L
(Germany) 1992	7th	11	5	0	6
(Portugal) 1994	1st	7	7	0	0
(Brazil) 1996	1st	8	8	0	0
(Argentina) 1998	5th	7	6	1	0
(Germany) 2000	1st	6	5	1	0
(Portugal) 2002	3rd	6	5	1	0
(Germany) 2004	3rd	6	4	1	1
(Chile) 2006	2nd	6	4	1	1
(Japan) 2008	1st	5	5	0	0
(Spain) 2010	3rd	6	5	0	1
(Brazil) 2012	2nd	6	5	0	1
(France) 2014	9th	5	3	0	2
(Chile) 2016	1st	6	6	0	0
(China) 2017	1st	6	5	1	0
(Spain) 2019	1st	6	6	0	0
(Argentina) 2022	2nd	5	5	0	0
Total		97	79	6	12

=== European Championship ===
Year	Pos.	GP	W	D	L
(Switzerland) 1991	3rd	8	4	3	1
(Italy) 1993	3rd	4	3	1	0
(Spain) 1995	1st	6	6	0	0
(Portugal) 1997	3rd	6	4	0	2
(Germany) 1999	2nd	5	4	1	0
(Italy) 2001	2nd	6	5	0	1
(France) 2003	2nd	6	5	0	1
(Portugal) 2005	3rd	5	3	0	2
(Spain) 2007	2nd	5	4	0	1
(France) 2009	1st	5	5	0	0
(Germany) 2011	1st	4	4	0	0
(Spain) 2013	1st	5	4	0	1
(Italy) 2015	1st	4	4	0	0
(Portugal) 2018	1st	6	6	0	0
(Portugal) 2021	1st	0	0	0	0
(Spain) 2023	1st	0	0	0	0
(Portugal) 2025	1st	0	0	0	0
Total		75	61	5	9

== Current squad ==
Squad for the 2017 World Cup.

Player	Club
Teresa Bernadas	(Spain) Alcorcón
Berta Busquets	(Spain) Generali Palau de Plegamans
Laura Vicente	(Spain) Generali Palau de Plegamans
Laura Puigdueta	(Spain) Generali Palau de Plegamans
Anna Casarramona	(Spain) Hostelcur Gijón
María Díez	(Spain) Hostelcur Gijón
Marta Lolo	(Spain) Hostelcur Gijón
Sara Lolo	(Spain) Hostelcur Gijón
Natasha Lee	(Spain) Voltregà
Nara López	(Spain) Voltregà
Berta Tarrida	(Spain) Voltregà
Aina Arxé	(Spain) Voltregà
Laura Barcons	(Spain) Manlleu
Gemma Solé	(Spain) Manlleu
Anna Ferrer	(Spain) Vila-sana

== See also ==
- Spain national roller hockey team
