= Colegio Suizo de Madrid =

Swiss international school in Madrid, Spain

- Schweizer Schule Madrid

Location
- Carretera de Burgos km 14 28108 Alcobendas Madrid
- Coordinates: 40.5211486°N 3.6543254000000616°W

Information
- Established: 1968
- Website: colegiosuizomadrid.edu.es

Colegio Suizo de Madrid (CSM; German: Schweizer Schule Madrid) is a Swiss international school in Alcobendas, Community of Madrid, Spain.

It serves students in levels pre-Kindergarten until Bachillerato/Gymnasium (senior high school).

It was first established in 1968.
