= Under 17 Female Club European Rink Hockey Tournament =

- Founded: 2014
- Region: Europe
- Current champions: (Spain) Cerdanyola

The Under 17 Female Clubs European Rink Hockey Tournament is an annual roller hockey competition for the under-17 club and national teams of Europe organised by World Skate Europe - Rink Hockey.

The current champions are Cerdanyola CH, who completed the European championship with a series of victories to lift the Quima Jimeno Cup at Paco Arpide.

== Results ==
Year	Edition	Cup	Host city	(gold) Gold	(silver) Silver	(bronze) Bronze
2014	1st	Sena	(Spain) Mieres	(Portugal) Turquel	(Spain) Belloch Vila-sana	(Spain) Hostelcur Solimar
2015	2nd	Gonzalez	(Spain) Mieres	(Spain) Mataró	(Spain) Vila-sana	(Portugal) Stuart
2016	3rd	Battistella	(Italy) Breganze	(Spain) Mataró	(Spain) Rivas Las Lagunas	(Switzerland) Swiss Project
2017	4th	Hirschfeld	(Germany) Remscheid	(Spain) Palau de Plegamans	(Italy) Breganze	(Germany) Eagle Team
2018	5th	Quima Jimeno	(Spain) Cerdanyola	(Spain) Cerdanyola	(Portugal) Stuart	(Spain) Mataró
2019	6th	Nunzio Fiorentini	(Italy) Molfetta			

== See also ==
- World Skate Europe - Rink Hockey
