= Italy women's national roller hockey team =

Italy
- Nickname(s): Hockey rosa
- Association: FIHP
- Confederation: FIRS
- Head coach: Gianni Massari

Italy women's national roller hockey team is the national team side of Italy at international roller hockey.

== Palmarès ==
| Competition | 1st place, gold medalist(s) | 2nd place, silver medalist(s) | 3rd place, bronze medalist(s) | Total |
|---|---|---|---|---|
| World Championship | 0 | 2 | 0 | 2 |
| European Championship | 2 | 2 | 1 | 5 |
| World Games | not yet disputed | | | |
| Total | 2 | 4 | 1 | 7 |

== Roster 2012 ==
The last season of the women's national championship was held in 2007–2008, although this in July 2012 the national team returned to gather in view of new international competitions.

| Athlete | Born | Role | Club |
|---|---|---|---|
| Di Santo Gloria | 1998 | Defender | Cresh Eboli |
| Galeassi Giulia | 1991 | Defender / Central | AS Viareggio |
| Gallotta Alessandra | 1997 | Central / Wing | Cresh Eboli |
| Gaudio Valentina | 1998 | Goalkeeper | Pattinomania Matera |
| Ghirardello Erika | 1997 | Central / Wing | Breganze |
| Grendene Giulia | 1996 | Punta / Wing | Roller Bassano |
| Lamacchia Luisa | 1997 | Central / Wing | Pattinomania Matera |
| Lapolla Pamela | 1996 | Central / Wing | Pattinomania Matera |
| Mele Maria Teresa | 1992 | Central / Wing | Pattinomania Matera |
| Minuzzo Laura | 1993 | Defender / Central | Roller Bassano |
| Pisati Alice | 1997 | Central / Wing | Amatori Lodi |
| Pochettino Gaia | 1996 | Central / Wing | Amatori Lodi |
| Raffaelli Jessica | 1991 | Defender / Central | AS Viareggio |
| Scotti Ilaria | 1995 | Central / Wing | Amatori Lodi |
| Tamiozzo Elena | 1998 | Defender / Central | Trissino |
| Toffanin Elena | 1989 | Central / Wing | Roller Bassano |
| Vannucci Chiara | 1988 | Forward | AS Viareggio |
| Vannucci Cinzia | 1988 | Forward | AS Viareggio |
| Xotta Marika | 1997 | Goalkeeper | Trissino |
| Zarantonello Sara | 1998 | Goalkeeper | Trissino |

== See also ==
- Italy at the team sports international competitions
- Italy men's national roller hockey team
