= Portugal women's national roller hockey team =

Portugal
- Nickname: Selecção das Quinas
- Association: Federação Portuguesa de Patinagem
- Confederation: CERH
Home colours	Away colours

Portugal women's national roller hockey team is the national team side of Portugal at international roller hockey competitions. It has 3 European titles.

== Titles ==
- European Championship (3)

1997, 1999, 2001

=== Other Achievements ===
==== World Cup ====
- 2nd place (5)

1998, 2000, 2008,2016,2024

- 3rd place (1)

1996,2022

- 4th place (4)

1994, 2002, 2004, 2012

==== European Championship ====
- 2nd place (4)

2005, 2011, 2013, 2015, 2018, 2021, 2023

- 3rd place (2)

2003, 2007

- 4th place (2)

1993, 2009

==== U-20 European Championship ====
- 2nd place (4)

2000, 2005, 2007, 2009
