= Buçaco Forest =

Park in Mealhada, Portugal

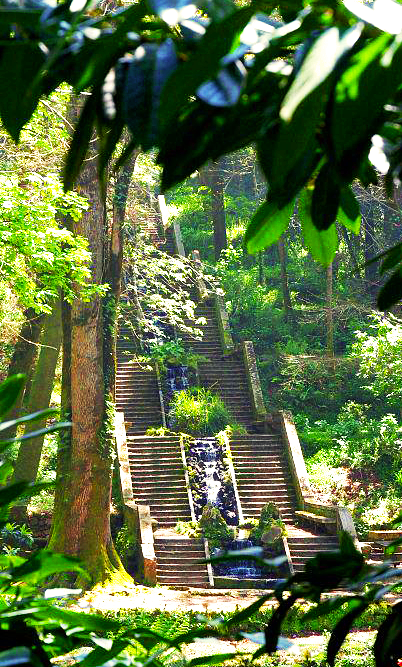
- The Fonte Fria (Cold Fountain) in Buçaco Forest is a cascading water stairway built in the 1880s.

- Location within Portugal
- Location: Luso, Mealhada, Aveiro, Centro, Portugal
- Coordinates: 40.377077°N 8.36533°W
- Elevation: 547 m (1,795 ft)

Buçaco Forest (Portuguese: Mata Nacional do Buçaco) is an ancient, walled arboretum in the Centro region of Portugal and home to one of the finest dendrological collections in Europe. The forest measures 1,450 by 950 metres (4,760 ft × 3,120 ft) and covers an area of 105 hectares (260 acres); the perimeter wall is approximately 5 kilometres (3.1 mi) in circumference and punctuated by a series of gates, one of which bears the text of 17th-century papal bulls forbidding women to enter and threatening to excommunicate anyone harming the trees, though neither stipulation is currently legally binding under Portuguese law. More than 250 tree and shrub species grow in the forest, including huge centenarians and exotics introduced by Portuguese mariners during the Age of Discovery. In 2004 Portugal submitted Buçaco Forest to UNESCO's tentative list of World Heritage Sites.

Many of the forest's trees have been discussed in popular and academic literature. In 1634, for example, a Portuguese scholar authored a collection of poems that mentioned Buçaco's cypresses; in 1768 an English botanist provoked a 200-year-long debate by claiming one of the forest's cypress varieties originated in Goa; in the late 1990s wine writer Hugh Johnson visited the arboretum and described a Tasmanian mountain ash as "surely Europe's most magnificent"; more recently, historian and arborist Thomas Pakenham included one of the forest's bunya pines in his book, Remarkable Trees of the World.

Buçaco Forest was once home to Discalced Carmelites: the monks built a convent, small chapels and the encircling walls, and tended the arboretum until the dissolution of the monasteries in 1834. At the end of the 19th century much of the convent was demolished to make way for an extravagant neo-Manueline palace. The palace was conceived as a retreat for the Portuguese royal family, but after the Lisbon Regicide and subsequent coup d'état it was converted to a luxury hotel, the Buçaco Palace.

== Geography and climate ==
Buçaco Forest is situated on the northwestern tip of the Serra do Buçaco in Portugal's Centro region. It covers an area of 105 hectares (260 acres) and is enclosed by a perimeter wall just over 5 kilometres (3.1 mi) in circumference. Dimensions are 1,450 by 950 metres (4,760 ft × 3,120 ft); elevation ranges from 190 to 547 metres (623 to 1,795 ft); a prevailing microclimate is characterized by mild temperatures, frequent morning fog and precipitation almost double the regional average. The nearest urban centre is Coimbra, an ancient university city and former capital of Portugal; the nearest parish is Luso, a spa town renowned for its mineral waters.

== History ==
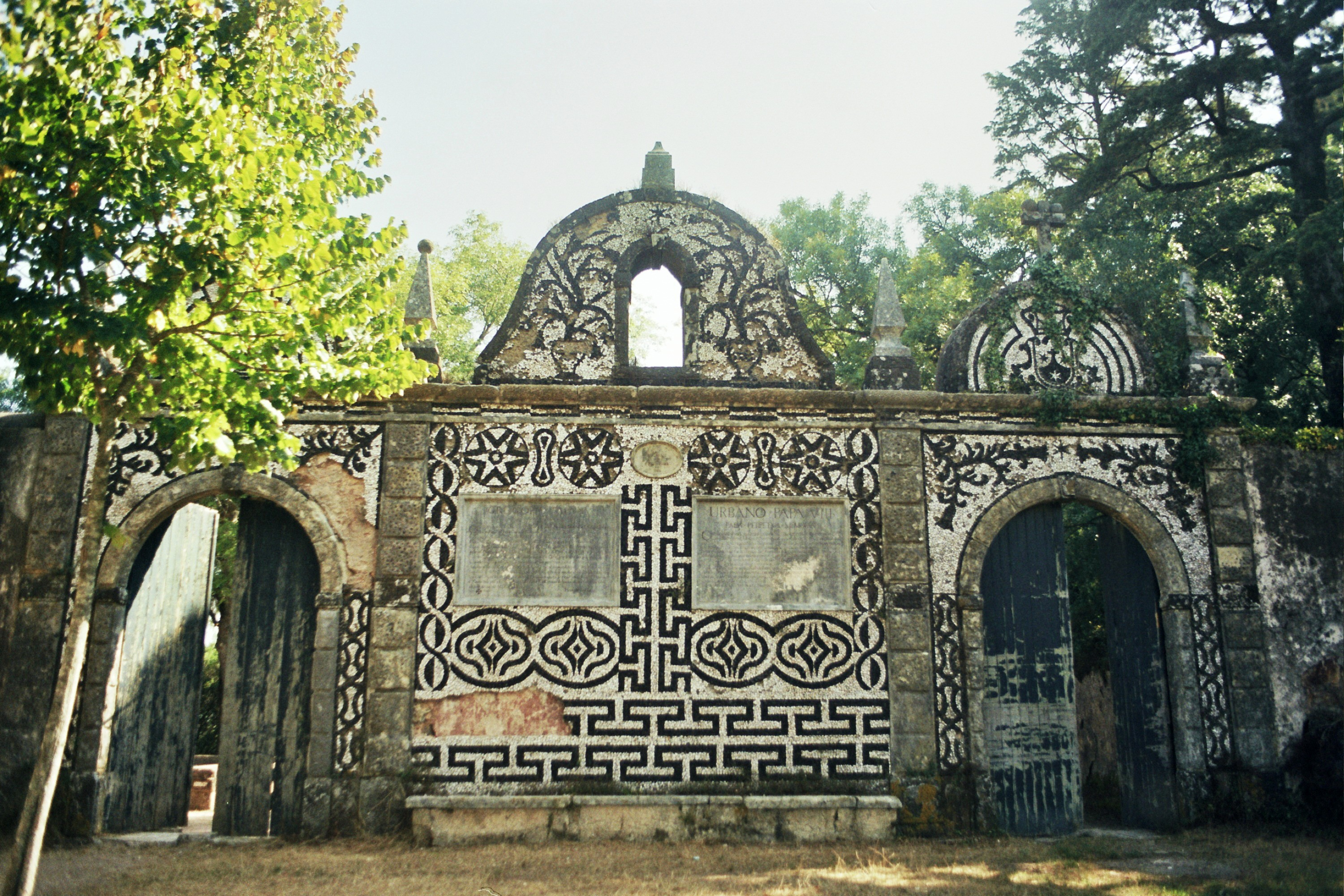
Portas de Coimbra (Coimbra Gate)

Buçaco Forest was first settled in the 6th century by friars from a nearby Benedictine monastery; five hundred years later the Bishops of Coimbra took possession of the forest and in 1628 donated it to the Order of Discalced Carmelites. The Carmelite monks promptly built a convent, perimeter walls and the first of the forest's ten gates, Portas de Coimbra (Coimbra Gate). Two papal bulls were issued during this period: the first, dated 1622, prohibited women from entering the forest; the second, dated 1643, threatened to excommunicate anyone found harming the trees. The text of both bulls is engraved on stone tablets affixed to the outer wall of Portas de Coimbra. At the end of the 17th century small chapels representing the Stations of the Cross were built along the Via Sacra, a steep, winding path that leads from the convent to the forest's highest point, Cruz Alta. The length of the path and distances between chapels were carefully measured to depict Christ's journey from the Mount of Olives to Calvary.

In September 1810 the tranquility was shattered by the Battle of Bussaco: the future Duke of Wellington, commanding an Anglo-Portuguese army of more than 56,000 men, maintained a defensive position on the Serra do Buçaco and succeeded in checking General Massena's advance into Portugal. Wellington stayed at the convent in Buçaco Forest during the days preceding the battle; an olive tree to which he tethered his horse still stands and is labelled "Wellington's olive tree".

Soon after the abolition of religious orders in 1834, ownership and management of the forest was transferred to the Administração Geral das Matas do Reino. A period of change ensued: the forest's area was expanded from 90 to 105 hectares (220 to 260 acres); neglected buildings were restored and new, exotic tree species introduced; a staircase leading up to the convent was remodeled into the Fonte Fria (Cold Fountain), a cascading water stairway and one of the forest's most notable architectural features. In 1888 much of the convent was demolished to allow construction of a sumptuous neo-Manueline palace. The palace was conceived as a retreat for the Portuguese royal family, but after the Lisbon Regicide and subsequent coup d'état it was converted to a luxury hotel, the Buçaco Palace.

In 2004 Portugal submitted Buçaco Forest to UNESCO's tentative list of World Heritage Sites. The UNESCO website describes the forest as "the archetype of an eighteenth-century romantic landscape", adding that it "boasts a remarkable botanical and scenic heritage" and is a place of "rare and outstanding beauty". José Saramago, winner of the 1998 Nobel Prize in Literature, declared, "Buçaco forest demands a whole vocabulary which, once spoken, tells us that there's still everything left to say. You don't describe Buçaco forest. The best thing is to lose yourself in it." In 2009 the forest's present governing body, Fundação Mata do Buçaco, was established to manage, conserve, revitalize and exploit the forest. A year later the European Union's LIFE programme subsidized an initiative aimed at preserving the oldest segment of the forest and controlling threats posed by invasive, non-indigenous species. The project is known as BRIGHT (Bussaco's Recovery from Invasions Generating Habitat Threats) and scheduled to run until 2016.

== Flora ==
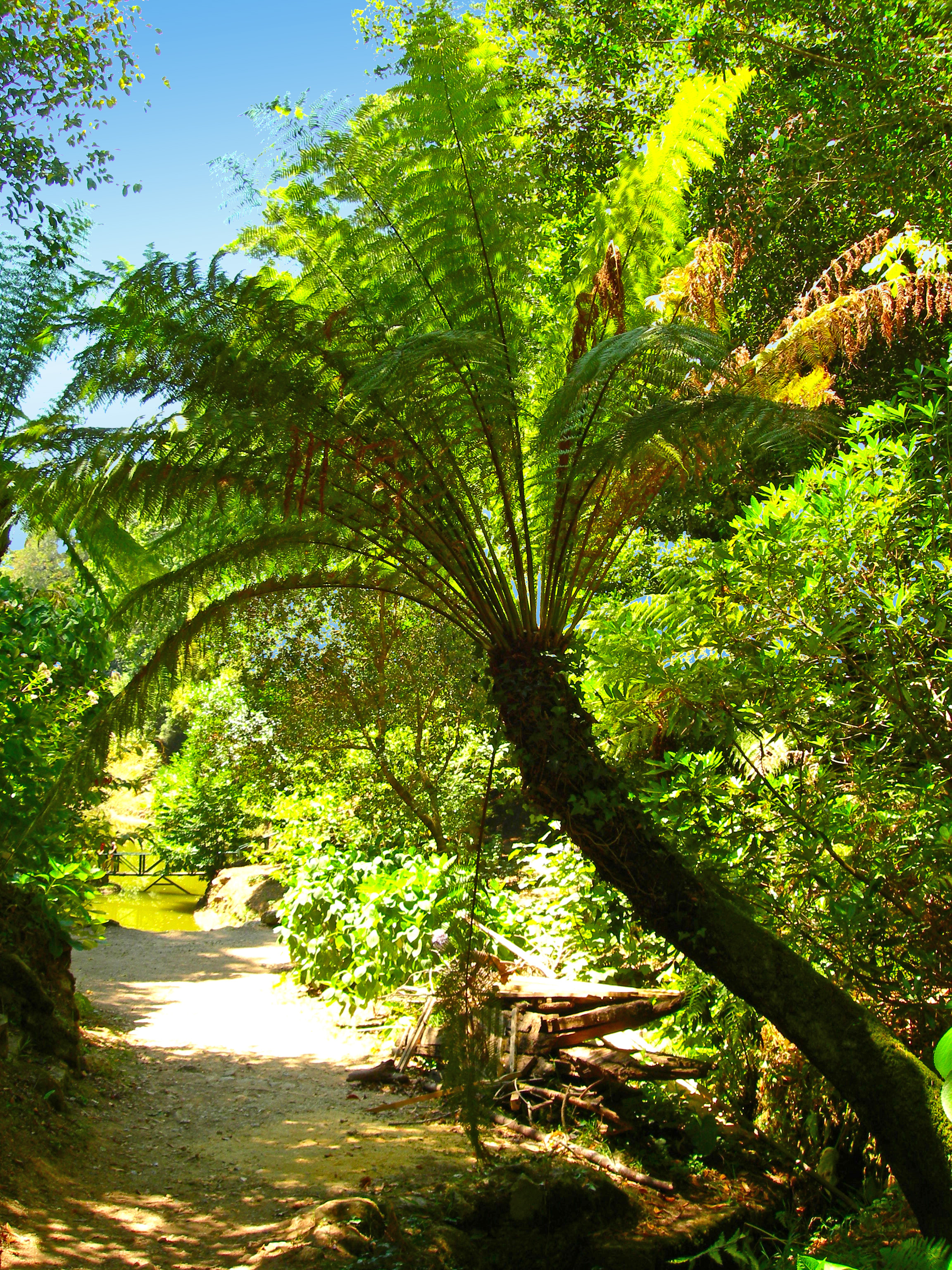
The Vale dos Fetos (Valley of the Ferns) is a small, damp area of the forest planted with giant tree ferns. Seeds for one of the species, Dicksonia antarctica, were sourced from nurseries in France and Belgium during the late 19th century.

Buçaco Forest has one of the finest dendrological collections in Europe. More than 250 tree and shrub species grow in the forest, including towering centenarians and exotics introduced by Portuguese navigators during the Age of Discovery. The forest comprises four distinct landscapes: the arboretum, which forms about 80% of the forest's area; the Floresta Relíquia (Forest Relic), a small, ancient woodland characterized by laurel, mock privet and species of oak; the Pinhal do Marquês, an area of about 13 hectares dominated by maritime pines; and the late 19th-century hotel gardens and Vale dos Fetos (Valley of the Ferns). The arboretum's early history is not known, but chronicles kept by the Carmelites indicate that afforestation may have begun long before they founded their convent in 1628.

The forest's most abundant tree is the Mexican cypress, a species also known as the Bucaco Cedar or Cedar of Goa. The tree was first mentioned by Portuguese scholar Bernarda de Lacerda in her Soledades de Buçaco, a collection of poems published in 1634. In 1768 English botanist Philip Miller provoked a 200-year-long debate after claiming the tree had been introduced to Portugal from Goa. Miller's claim was formally rebutted in 1993 when a paper published by the International Association for Plant Taxonomy reclassified the species as a native of Mexico. Ten years later further research into the tree's origins was undertaken using DNA tests: results showed that while the Mexican cypress is more likely to have been introduced to the forest from Mexico than India, the supporting data is "not very strong".

A map issued by the Fundação Mata do Buçaco lists 86 "remarkable trees" in the forest, one of which is a Tasmanian mountain ash growing near the hotel. English wine writer Hugh Johnson commented on the tree in his book Hugh Johnson in the Garden, opining that it is "surely Europe's most magnificent". In 2010 a researcher from Australia's Currency Creek Arboretum measured the tree during a field trip and concluded that it had the largest diameter of any eucalypt he and his team had examined in Portugal. Other notable specimens listed on the map include the olive tree to which Wellington tied his horse, a bunya pine featured in Thomas Pakenham's 2002 tome, Remarkable Trees of the World, and fine examples of cedar, ginkgo and sequoia.

Buçaco Forest's camellias were discussed in a paper presented at the 2014 Pontevedra International Camellia Congress. The paper, Buçaco and Villar d'Allen: A Story of the Camelliomania in Portugal, described the introduction of 30 cultivars to the forest from a garden in Porto in 1894. Camellias were very popular in Europe during the 19th century, inspiring gardeners, wealthy collectors and the novel, La Dame aux Camélias.

== Fauna ==
A PhD thesis published in 2011, Vertebrate Diversity in the Bussaco Mountain and Surrounding Areas, documented research undertaken in the Serra do Buçaco and identified 56 species of mammals, birds, bats and amphibians found in Buçaco Forest.

== Windstorm Gong ==
On 19 January 2013 a cyclone named Windstorm Gong struck Portugal, causing widespread disruption. Almost 1 million homes were left without electricity; thousands of trees were brought down and hundreds of greenhouses destroyed. Portugal's Público newspaper reported extensive damage to Buçaco Forest, including the loss of a cypress known as Cedro de São José, a much-loved tree believed to have been planted in 1644. A press release issued by the forest's governing body 2 years later summarized the aftermath: more than 40% of the forest was seriously affected by the storm; religious buildings dating back to the days of the Carmelites suffered structural damage; of the forest's 86 remarkable trees, 10 were felled and 6 critically harmed. The press release also discussed ongoing rehabilitation and reforestation, the inauguration of a bridge across a small stream (the bridge was constructed from a cypress brought down in the storm), and the formation of a private sector partnership to produce furniture from fallen trees.

== Sources ==
PhD theses

- Matos, Milena Marina Amaral dos Santos (2011). Vertebrate Diversity in the Bussaco Mountain and Surrounding Areas (PhD). Portugal: Universidade de Aveiro. Archived from the original on 26 October 2020. Alt URL
- Simões, Paula Marisa Nunes (2012). The Recreational Use Value of a National Forest (PhD). Portugal: Universidade de Coimbra. Archived from the original on 28 July 2015.

Books

- Chambers, G.L. (1910), Bussaco, London: Swan Sonnenschein
- Denby, Elaine (1998), Grand Hotels: Reality and Illusion, London: Reaktion Books, ISBN 978-1861891211
- Ellingham, Mark; Fisher, John; Kenyon, Graham (2002), The Rough Guide to Portugal (10 ed.), London: Rough Guides, ISBN 978-1858288772
- Gothein, Marie-Luise (2014) [First published 1913], A History of Garden Art, vol. 1, Cambridge: Cambridge Library Collection, ISBN 978-1108076166
- Johnson, Hugh (2009), Hugh Johnson in the Garden, London: Mitchell Beazley, ISBN 978-1845334857
- Pakenham, Thomas (2002), Remarkable Trees of the World, New York: W. W. Norton & Company, ISBN 978-0393049114
- Saramago, José (2002), Journey to Portugal: In Pursuit of Portugal's History and Culture, London: Harvill Press, ISBN 978-1860468728

Journals, conference papers and reports

- Bartholomew, Bruce (1986), "The Chinese Species of Camellia in Cultivation", Arnoldia, 46 (1): 2–15, ISSN 0004-2625, JSTOR 42954234
- Borges, Célia Maia (2011), "Os Eremitas e o Ideal de Santidade no Imaginário Português" (PDF), Lusitania Sacra, 2nd series (23): 189–206, ISSN 0076-1508, archived from the original (PDF) on 9 August 2015
- Cordeiro, L.; Paz, E.; Sales, F. (2014). Buçaco and Villar d'Allen: A Story of the Camelliomania in Portugal [Abstract]. Paper presented at the 2014 Pontevedra International Camellia Congress; 11–15 March. Pontevedra, Spain. Archived from the original on 6 March 2016.
- Farjon, Aljos (1993), "Nomenclature of the Mexican Cypress or Cedar of Goa", Taxon, 42 (1): 81–84, doi:10.2307/1223306, ISSN 0040-0262, JSTOR 1223306
- Horward, Donald (1989), "Wellington and the Defence of Portugal", The International History Review, 11 (1): 39–54, doi:10.1080/07075332.1989.9640500, ISSN 0707-5332, JSTOR 40105954
- Liberato, Margarida L.R. (2014), "The 19 January 2013 Windstorm over the North Atlantic", Weather and Climate Extremes, 5–6: 16–28, doi:10.1016/j.wace.2014.06.002, ISSN 2212-0947
- Mansourian, Stephanie; Rossi, Magali; Vallauri, Daniel (2013), Ancient Forests in the Northern Mediterranean: Neglected High Conservation Value Areas (PDF), Marseille: WWF France, archived from the original (PDF) on 2 August 2015
- Masters, Dr Maxwell T. (1895), "The Cedar of Goa", Journal of the Royal Horticultural Society, 17: 1–11, ISSN 0035-8924
- Rushforth, K.; Adams, R.P.; Zhong, M.; Pandey, R.N. (2003), "Variation among Cupressus Species from the Eastern Hemisphere Based on Random Amplified Polymorphic DNAs" (PDF), Biochemical Systematics and Ecology, 31 (1): 17–24, doi:10.1016/s0305-1978(02)00073-x, ISSN 0305-1978, archived from the original (PDF) on 6 July 2015
- Vilmorin, Jacques L. de (1907), "La Forêt de Bussaco", Bulletin de la Société Dendrologique de France (in French), 4: 49–57

Newsletters and newspapers

- Hignett, Sean (1999), "Portugal: The History of a Palace-Turned-Hotel", The Daily Telegraph, archived from the original on 3 August 2015
- Nicolle, Dean (2011), "Giant Eucalypts Found in ... Europe!", Biobuzz (14), archived from the original on 25 March 2015
- Portocarrero, Marta (2013), "A História de um Cedro que o Vento Levou", Público, archived from the original on 4 August 2015

Press releases, fact sheets and maps

- "19 de Janeiro: 2 Anos Depois do Ciclone GONG" (PDF). Fundação Mata do Buçaco (in Portuguese). Alt URL
- "Árvores Notáveis (Map of Remarkable Trees)" (PDF). Fundação Mata do Buçaco (in Portuguese). Archived from the original (PDF) on 4 August 2015.
- "BRIGHT – Bussaco's Recovery from Invasions Generating Habitat Threats". European Union. Archived from the original on 3 August 2015.
- "Fact sheet (Mata Nacional do Buçaco)" (PDF). Fundação Mata do Buçaco (in Portuguese). Alt URL

Websites

- "Conheça a Mata". Fundação Mata do Buçaco (in Portuguese). Archived from the original on 3 July 2015.
- "Documentação a Mata Nacional do Bussaco". DRAP Centro (in Portuguese). Archived from the original on 28 June 2014.
- "Forest Park of the Discalced Carmelites, Bucaco". UNESCO World Heritage Centre. Archived from the original on 30 May 2015.
- "Portugal: Properties Submitted on the Tentative List". UNESCO World Heritage Centre. Archived from the original on 21 July 2015.
- "Presentation of the Project (BRIGHT)". Fundação Mata do Buçaco. Archived from the original on 3 August 2015.
