= Convento de Santa Cruz do Buçaco =

Monastery in Portugal

Santa Cruz do Buçaco Convent
- Convento de Santa Cruz do Buçaco
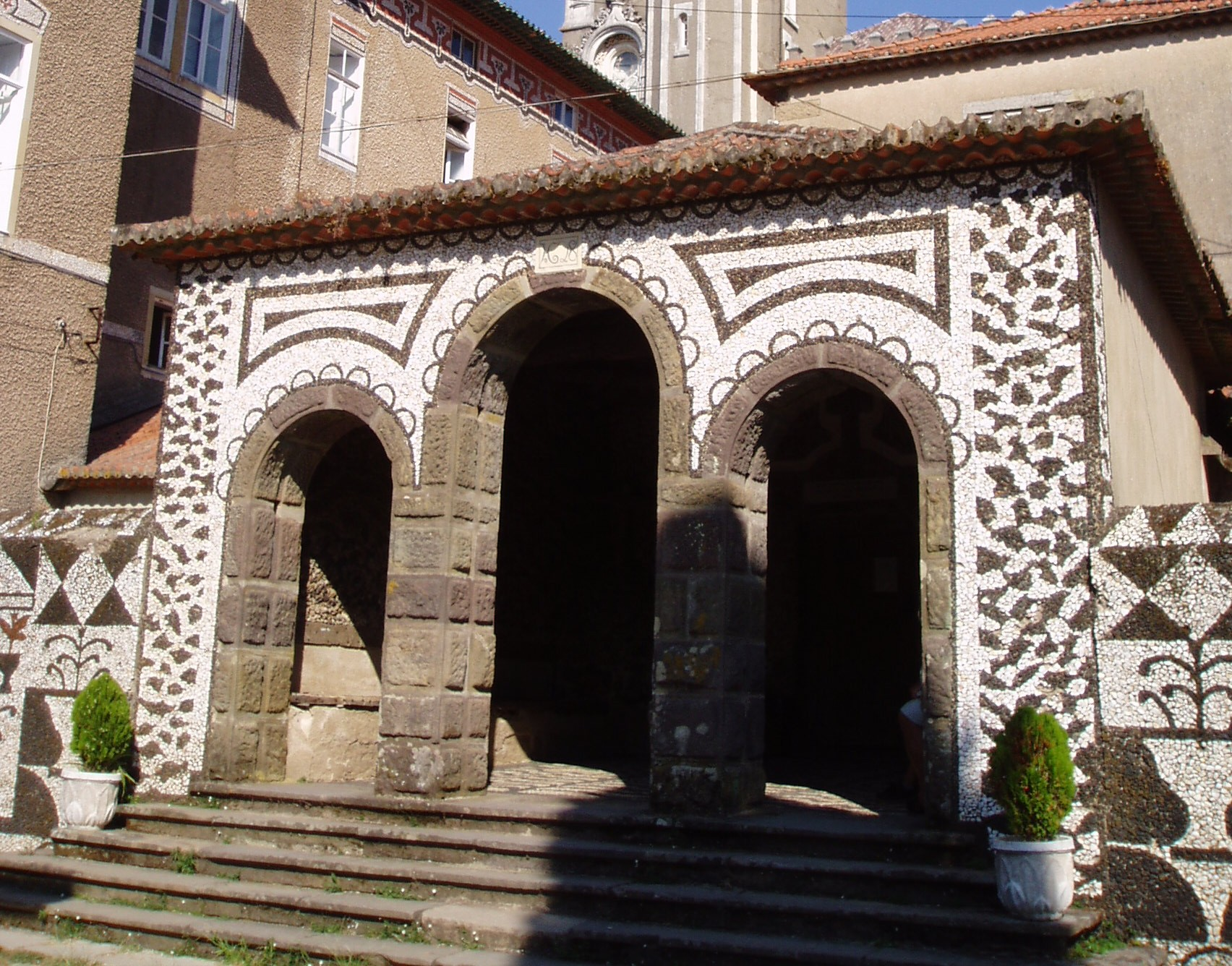
- Preserved chapel of the Convento de Santa Cruz do Buçaco beside the Palace Hotel.
- Interactive map of the Santa Cruz do Buçaco Convent area

General information
- Type: Convent
- Architectural style: Manueline
- Location: Mealhada, Portugal
- Coordinates: 40°22′34″N 8°21′56″W
- Groundbreaking: 1628
- Construction started: 1628
- Completed: 1630
- Affiliation: Order of the Brothers of the Blessed Virgin Mary of Mount Carmel

Portuguese National Monument
- Type: Non-movable
- Criteria: National Monument
- Designated: 15 June 2018
- Reference no.: IPA.00005690

References
- http://www.monumentos.gov.pt/site/app_pagesuser/sipa.aspx?id=5690

Convento de Santa Cruz do Buçaco is a former Carmelite monastery in the Mata Nacional do Buçaco (Buçaco Forest) protected forest of the Serra do Buçaco, Portugal.

It was constructed in 1628. It closed in 1834 following the suppression of male religious orders and dissolution of the monasteries in Portugal at the end of the Portuguese Civil War.

Most of the buildings were demolished and the stones were reused in the Palace Hotel of Buçaco. However the chapel of the convent, with Baroque altarpieces, remains beside the hotel.
