= Biester Palace =

Residence in Sintra, Portugal

- Palácio Biester

- Location within Portugal
- Alternative names: Chalet Biester; Casa Biester

General information
- Type: Residence
- Architectural style: Revivalist, neo-Gothic, Romantic
- Location: Sintra, Portugal
- Coordinates: 38°47′38″N 09°23′39″W
- Construction started: 1880s
- Completed: 1907
- Client: Frederico and Amélia Biester

Technical details
- Floor count: 4

Design and construction
- Architect: José Luis Monteiro
- Other designers: Leandro Braga; Luigi Manini; Paul-Jacques-Aimé Baudry

UNESCO World Heritage Site
- Part of: Cultural Landscape of Sintra
- Criteria: Cultural: (ii), (iv), (v)
- Reference: 723
- Inscription: 1995 (19th Session)

The Biester Palace (Portuguese: Palácio Biester), also known as Chalet Biester and Casa Biester, is a large, family building designed primarily to be a summer home, that overlooks Sintra in Portugal. It is known for its interior decorations, with considerable use of wood and frescoes, and is surrounded by extensive exotic gardens. Privately owned, it has been open to visitors since 2022.

== History ==
The building was conceived in 1880 by Ernesto Biester (1828–1880), a wealthy playwright and theatre impresario in Lisbon. He identified one of Portugal's leading architects, José Luis Monteiro, to design it. Unfortunately, Biester died childless the same year and responsibility for building the house passed to his brother, Frederico and his wife Amélia Freitas Guimarães Chamiço, who came from a family of bankers. The couple were extremely wealthy, well-travelled, and well-informed about international trends, particularly admiring the mansions that lined the boulevards of Paris after the reforms to the layout of that city instituted by Georges-Eugène Haussmann. Leandro Braga (1839–1897) was identified to carry out the intricate woodcarving and Luigi Manini (1848–1936), an architect and set designer, who designed the Buçaco Palace, to do the interior decoration, with ceilings being painted by the French artist, Paul-Jacques-Aimé Baudry. Tiles for both the house and garden were supplied by the factory of the noted artist Rafael Bordalo Pinheiro. It is not certain when the construction began: one source suggests 1886. Records show that the stained glass supplied by "Hubert of Paris" and "Champ Vert" was installed in 1889, and that Braga worked between 1894 and 1896. The building was not fully completed until 1907 although possibly occupied before then.

== Design ==
Axonometric floor plan of Biester Palace

The Biester Palace is bordered by the Quinta da Regaleira to the west and by the Estrada da Pena, which leads from Sintra to the Castle of the Moors and the Pena Palace, to the east. Described as an eclectic revivalist mansion with influences drawn from the Romantic and neo-Gothic styles, the building is considered one of the most representative works of Monteiro. Others have noted the influence of Art Nouveau, Neo-Mudéjar and Alpine styles. Its present condition remains faithful to the original design and reflects the fact that it was intended to be both a home and an important venue for the couple's social life. Divided into two floors, with a kitchen in the basement, the house includes a dining room, ballroom, billiard room, library, and a chapel. Two other notable features, which were very rare at the time, are a lift and an en suite bathroom in the master bedroom. The wooden lift was constructed by Raoul Mesnier de Ponsard who, among other things, was responsible for the Santa Justa Lift in Lisbon. The lift was manually operated from the outside on the ground floor, employing a system of cogwheels. Part of this mechanism can be seen in the basement.

Vaulted stone hall, believed to have been built for secret Knights Templar initiation rituals.

On the ground floor, the library and reading room features a ceiling painted with complex mysterious pagan symbols, which are not fully understood. The living room also has paintings by Manini, as does the music room, which contains an American organ from the 1880s. The ballroom has a large fireplace decorated with Bordalo Pinheiro tiles. Several of the rooms have doors opening to the terrace, with views of Sintra. The wooden staircase is neo-gothic in style, with Art Nouveau frescos by Manini. At the top of the stairs there is a neo-Gothic chapel with two entrances, one used by the residents and the other by visitors. It takes its inspiration from the Knights Templar, who had connections with Sintra going back to the Reconquista, and has symbolic paintings and impressive stained-glass windows of Francis of Assisi, Teresa of Ávila, Elizabeth of Portugal, and Saint Joseph. The ceiling is by Baudry. The remainder of the first floor is devoted to living quarters. The ceiling of the master bedroom was also painted by Baudry and has an angel with the “Mona Lisa effect,” with the eyes seeming to follow the observer. Stairs lead to a second floor, but this is closed to the public.

== The gardens ==
Palace viewed from the gardens

The gardens, mainly on steep slopes, were designed by the French landscaper François Nogré, about whom little is known. It is believed that he took his inspiration from the gardens of the Pena Palace. Biester's gardens make full use of the natural contours, employing ponds, waterfalls, bridges and caves and take full advantage of the views offered, including the centre of Sintra and the Castle of the Moors. With access to plentiful water, they are very lush and exuberant. The gardens contain species from all over the world including camellias from China and Japan, the endangered Ginkgo biloba, green and red beech trees from central Europe, conifers and gum trees from North America, ferns from Australia, plane trees and laurels, Acanthus mollis, periwinkles, and tamarillos, among many other species. There is also a cave with tiles by Bordalo Pinheiro.

== Tragedy ==
The families of both Frederico and Amélia were severely affected by deaths caused by epidemics, especially the Chamiço family of Amélia, which was almost completely wiped out by tuberculosis. The fatalities included both her (died 1900) and Frederico (1899). In the end, only Amélia's aunt, Claudina Ermelinda Chamiço, remained, and she funded the construction of the Santana Sanatorium in Parede, the development of which had been a wish of Amélia.

== In popular culture ==
In 1999 the building was used as a set for the film The Ninth Gate directed by Roman Polanski and starring Johnny Depp, Lena Olin and Frank Langella.

== Gallery ==
The ballroom serves as the main reception room of the house.

Drawing room

Bedroom

Neo-Gothic chapel with Knights Templar motifs

Balcony

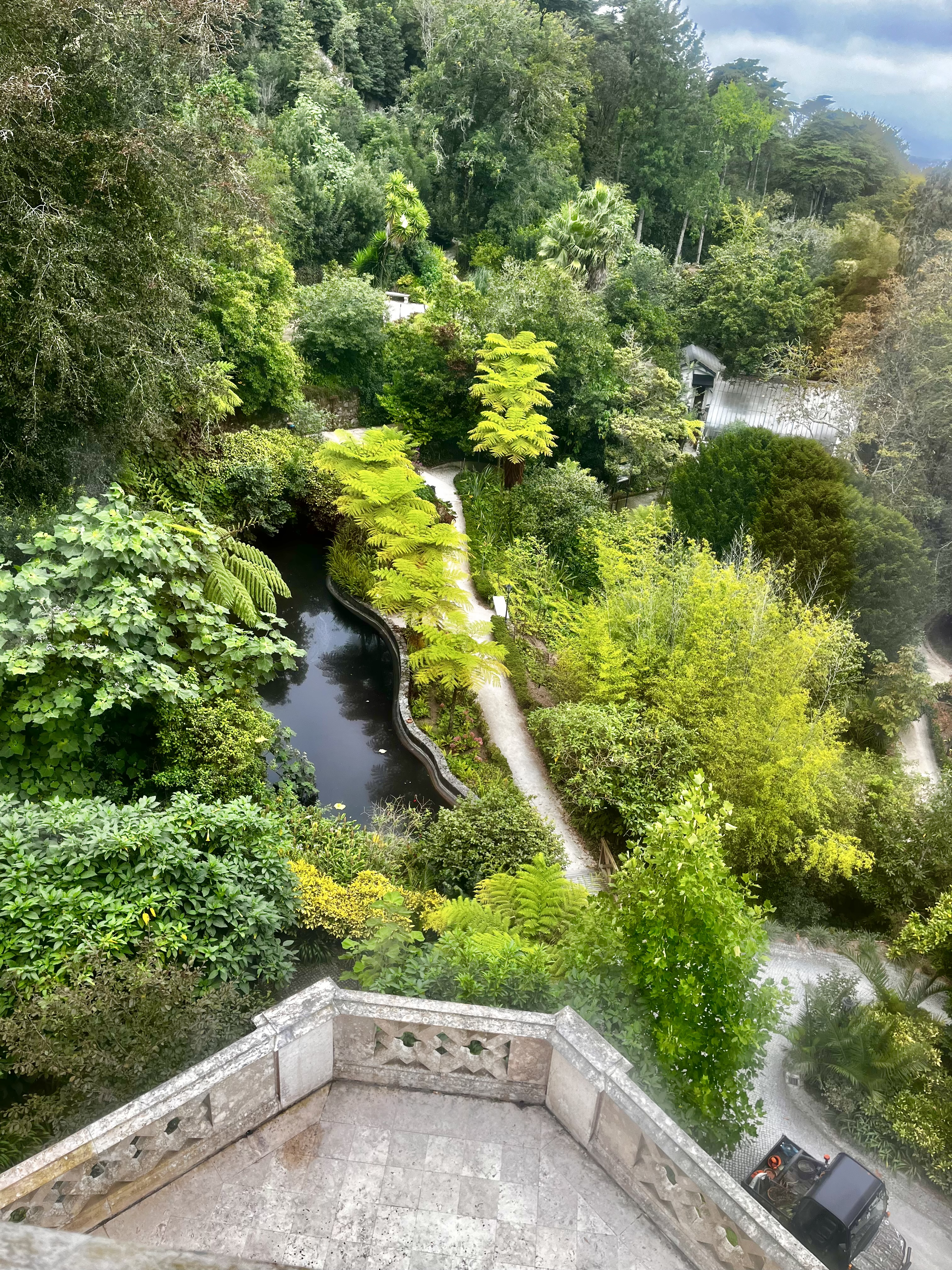
View of part of the gardens from the house
