= Luigi Manini =

Italian set designer, architect and painter

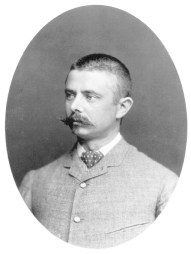
Luigi Pietro Manini Luigi Manini

Luigi Pietro Manini, Count of Fagagna (8 March 1848 in Crema, Lombardy-Venetia, Austrian Empire – 29 June 1936 in Brescia) was an Italian set designer, architect, and painter. He arrived in Lisbon, Portugal, in 1879, where he lived until he returned to Italy in 1913. Manini was responsible for some of the most striking architectural designs in Portugal; some of his most famous works include:

- Buçaco Palace;
- Quinta da Regaleira;
- Jardim da Regaleira with its inverse initiating well;
- Vila Relógio;
- Vila Sassetti;
- Challet Mayer;
- Interior decoration at Biester Palace.

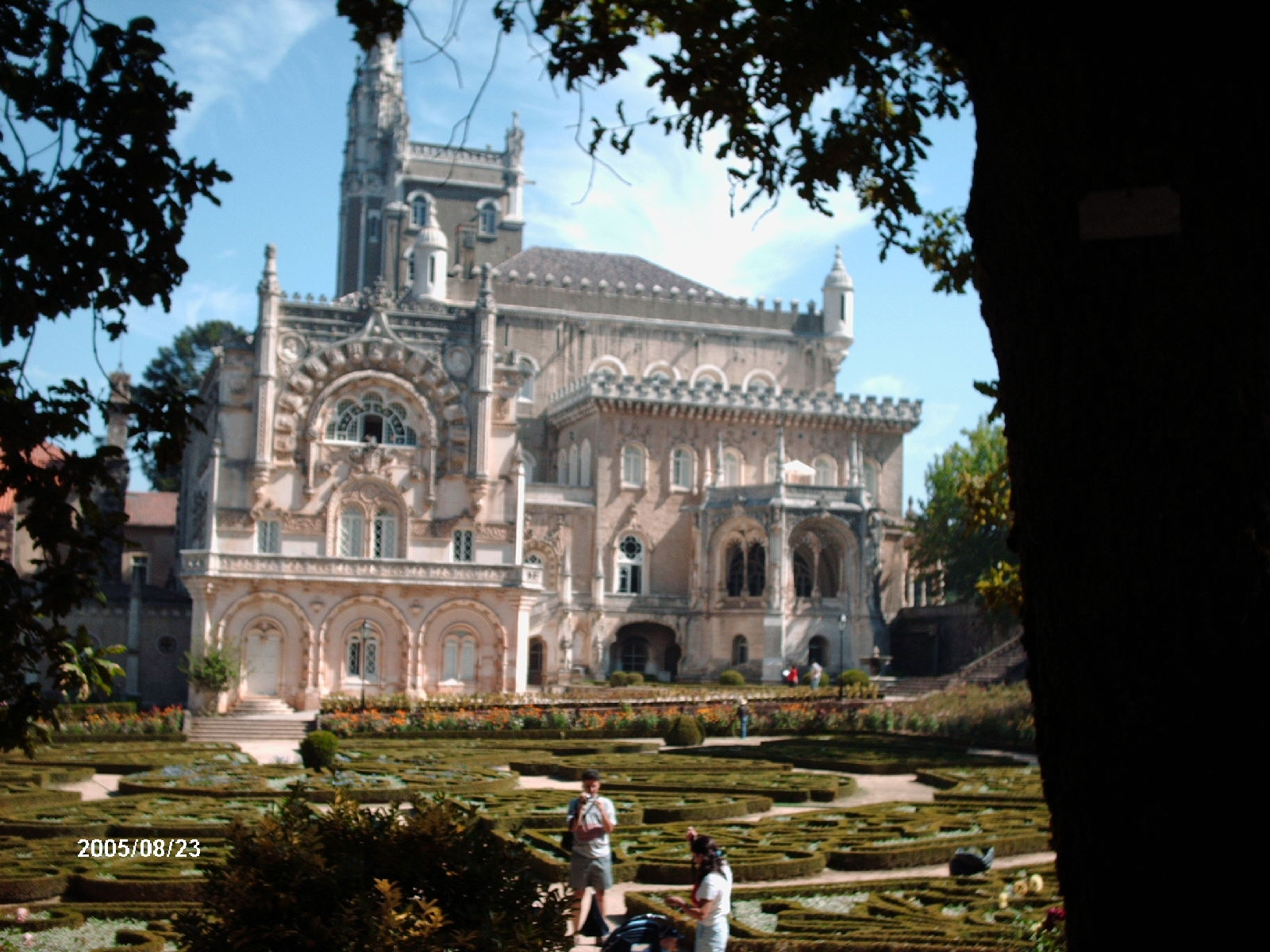
Palácio Hotel do Buçaco

Quinta da Regaleira, Sintra, Portugal

== Early life ==
He was born in Crema, Lombardy, Italy, and attended the school of master, Antonio Polgati, where he studied until 1861 under the direction of Professor Ferdiando Cassina in Milan and Brescia. He also attended the Academy of Fine Arts in Brera (Milan) and in 1874 worked as an assistant with the distinguished set designer, Carlo Ferrario, the professor of stage design at La Scala. Manini then moved to Portugal to work for the Real Teatro de São Carlos (nowadays the Teatro Nacional de São Carlos) in 1879. He lived on in Portugal until 1913 when he returned to Italy where he died in Brescia in 1936.

== Career ==
While he was still living in Italy, he worked in his hometown where he decorated the churches of Vaiano Cremasco and Zappello. He showed remarkable skills for tempering and in the restoration of the frescoes of the church of San Bernardino. He also worked on the decoration of Villa Stramezzi (Moscazzano).

Thanks to the patronage of the wealthy Count of Farrobo, the Opera de São Carlos reopened in January 1834 following the end of the liberal wars. From its opening date to 1879, the resident set designer was Giuseppe Cinatti (Siena, 1808), but following his death it was necessary to hire a new artist. Thanks to Manini's experience at the Teatro a la Scala, he was the chosen set designer to replace Ginatti. At that time, Portugal lacked the technical and artistic expertise, which Luigi Manini brought from his experience in Italy.

Manini quickly dominated the market from his predecessor, Cinatti, and while collaborating with Rambois, became the new master of Portuguese set design. He not only gained critical acclaim as a set designer, but was also seen as an innovative painter. His paintings were strongly influenced by lyrical theatrical themes. In the context of Portuguese scenography, Manini left some important legacies of his design, not only in the Teatro de São Carlos, but also the Teatro Dona Maria II (the latter which was inaugurated in 1846 by Almeida Garrett).

When Manini turned 40 in 1888, he was invited by Emídio Navarroto to design a palace in the Buçaco mountain range which was to be used as a hunting lodge for the royal family. Manini's architectural vision was for a romantic neo-Roman style, a design which was on the decline since 1878. Manini, however, oblivious to the new emerging aesthetic currents, stuck with his intended design and constructed the Buçaco Palace. This in return gave rise to working opportunities for other Venetian artists, such as Norte Júnior and Nicola Bigaglia who executed the decorative paintings, as well as the sculptor J. Machado. Additional artists who contributed to the palace included local masters from the Free School of Fine Art of Coimbra.

In 1894 Manini worked on the décor for the Theater São Luiz, which was inaugurated in the same year, and in 1895 worked on the décor of the Military Museum. Both are good examples of his nationalistic ideas combining Manueline elements. Manini also painted the staircase passage in the Foz Palace and decorated the Portuguese Pavilion at the Paris Universal Exhibition in 1900 with an allegorical screen of the discoveries and voyages of Pedro Álvares Cabral, scenes of Fernão de Magalhães and Corte Real.

At the end of the 19th century, celebration of the greatness of Portuguese discoveries were at their highest. With events such as the Cameron celebrations in 1880 and events in 1898 celebrating Vasco da Gama's incredible voyage to India, the Manueline style was never more prevalent. This cultural environment was the ideal breeding ground for what would be one of Manini's most spectacular architectural works: Quinta da Regaleira (Sintra). The property was acquired at the beginning of the 20th century by the millionaire Antonio Augusto Carvalho Monteiro (also known as "Monteiro the Millionaire"). In love with the work of Camões, Monteiro commissioned Manini to design the palace standing today at Quinta da Regaleira which gave rise to Manini's fantastic Manueline fantasies. The town of Sintra was no stranger to this aesthetic, with the Royal Palace boasting the original and unique elements in Manueline. During this revival period the Manueline influence left its mark on other surrounding palaces in the area too, including the Palacio da Pena, which was the work of Baron Eschwege (an artist who also worked on Palacio de Buçaco and assisted on the Regaleira Palace). Both palaces were built in stone, which was sent by rail to Sintra from the Pedra de Ançã quarry located in the vicinity of Coimbra.

Other projects Manini participated in include the Torre de São Sebastião, a palace that currently houses the Condes de Castro Guimarães Library Museum in Cascais. Manini also contributed to more minor projects of art, including the decorations made at the Garcia de Resende Theater (in Évora), the Teatro Sá de Miranda (in Viana do Castelo) and the D. Maria Pia Theater, Municipal Theater Baltazar Dias. In 1913, Manini returned to Italy with his fortunes made in Portugal, where he lived until his death in Brescia at the age of 88 on June 29, 1936. He was buried in Cremona, in the family chapel. The Cremona library still holds many of his drawings today.

Manini's other work in Portugal includes the sets for the operas Aida, Il Guarany, Lohengrin, Mephistoles, and Otello, Teatro de Funchal the Winter Garden at the Teatro de São João.

== Personal life ==
His wife, Teresa, was sister of the painter Angelo Bacchetta, and their daughter Ebe married Bacchetta's son, Azelio.

== Sources ==
- Great Houses of Europe by Alex Starkey and Marcus Binney
