= Teatro Sá de Miranda =

Theatre in Viana do Castelo, Portugal

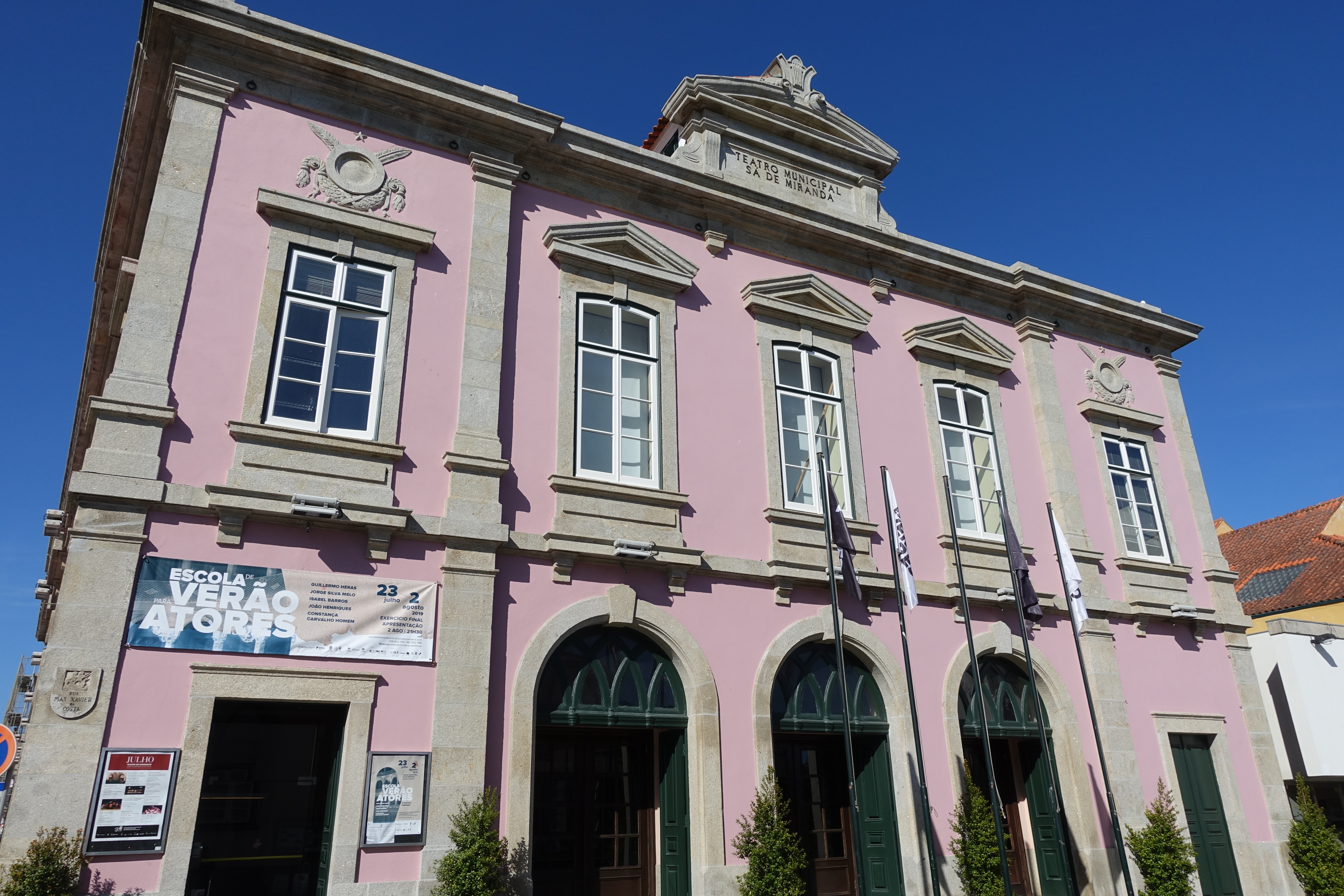
- Interactive map of Teatro Sá de Miranda
- Address: Rua de Sá de Miranda, Viana do Castelo; Portugal
- Coordinates: 41°41′44″N 08°49′44″W
- Owner: Municipality of Viana do Castelo
- Capacity: 400

Construction
- Opened: 29 April 1885
- Architect: José Geraldo da Silva Sardinha

The Teatro Sá de Miranda (also known as the Teatro Municipal Sá de Miranda), is a theatre in Viana do Castelo in northern Portugal. Believed to be the fifth-oldest Portuguese theatre that still retains its original features, the Sá de Miranda has a capacity of 400.

== Origins ==
The theatre's construction was the result of the efforts of a group of people from Viana do Castelo, who formed the Companhia Fomentadora Vianense in 1879. It is named after Francisco de Sá de Miranda (1481–1558), who was a Portuguese Renaissance poet. It follows an Italian style and was designed by José Geraldo da Silva Sardinha, with horseshoe-shaped stalls and three rows of boxes, 21 first-class and 16 second-class. The curtain was designed by Luigi Manini and painted by Hercole Labertini, both set designers of the Teatro Nacional de São Carlos in Lisbon. The ceiling, a trompe l'oeil image of the sky with portraits of playwrights, was painted by João Baptista do Rio. There are 20 friezes. The theatre was inaugurated on 29 April 1885.

In his Dictionary of Portuguese Theatre, published in 1908, António de Sousa Bastos described the Sá de Miranda as "one of the best in the provinces… a truly comfortable and luxurious theatre." He noted that most of the leading performers from Lisbon and Porto had performed there.

== Later life ==
With theatres beginning to face competition from films, the Sá de Miranda was converted to also show movies. At one stage it was showing pornographic films. Over time it became increasingly dilapidated and, in 1985, it was purchased by the city council. Since then, it has undergone improvement, first in 1993, to improve comfort and safety (in a country that has suffered many theatre fires) and, in a second phase in 2000, to equip the stage with modern equipment. Situated under the stage are 17 dressing rooms, together with storage rooms. It is now equipped with two performance halls, a rehearsal room, an exhibition hall and a café-concert room.

Since 1991, the theatre has housed a resident company, the Teatro do Noroeste – Centro Dramático de Viana. Since 2021 it has been a member of the Rede de Teatros e Cineteatros Portugueses (Network of Portuguese Theatres and Cinema-theatres).
