= Mealhada =

- Municipality
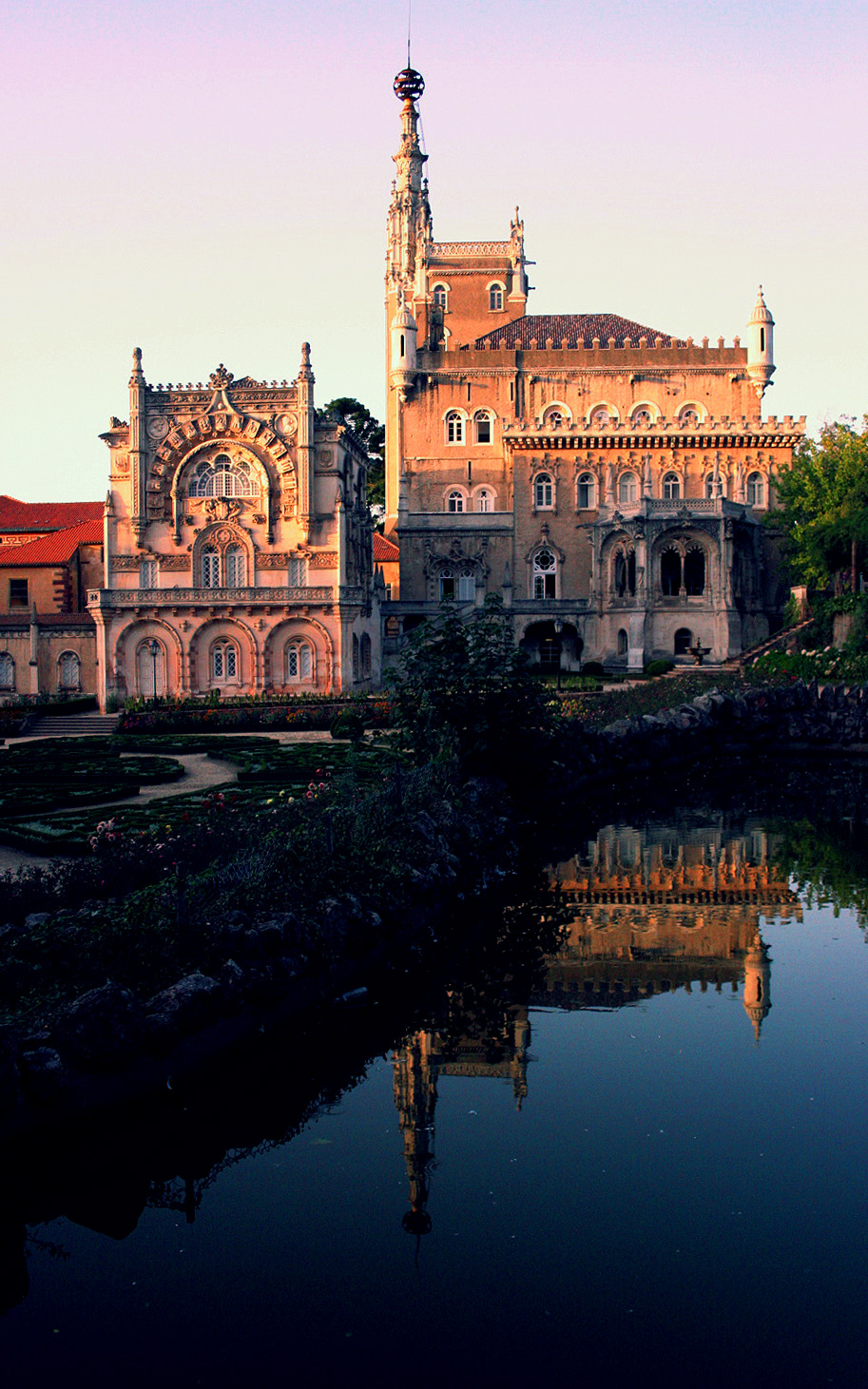
- Buçaco Palace

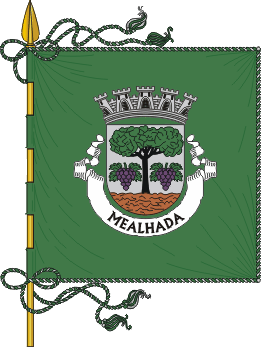
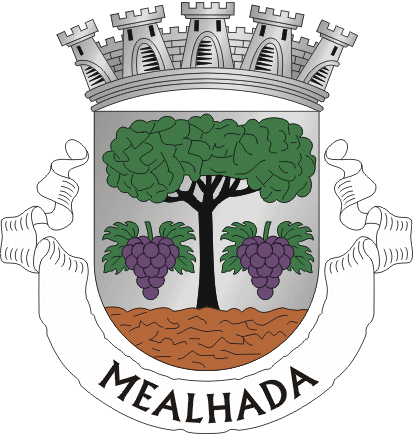
- Flag Coat of arms
- Interactive map of Mealhada
- Location in Portugal
- Coordinates: 40°23′N 8°27′W
- Country: Portugal
- Region: Centro
- Intermunic. comm.: Região de Coimbra
- District: Aveiro
- Parishes: 6

Government
  - President: Rui Marqueiro (PS)

Area
  - Total: 110.66 km^{2} (42.73 sq mi)

Population (2011)
  - Total: 20,428
  - Density: 184.60/km^{2} (478.12/sq mi)
- Time zone: UTC+00:00 (WET)
  - Summer (DST): UTC+01:00 (WEST)
- Local holiday: Ascension Day date varies
- Website: http://www.cm-mealhada.pt

Mealhada (Portuguese pronunciation: [mi.ɐˈʎaðɐ]) is a city and a municipality located in Aveiro District in Portugal. The population in 2011 was 20,428, in an area of 110.66 km^{2}. It had 17,043 eligible voters (2006). The city of Mealhada itself has a population of 4,522.

It is included in the Região de Coimbra. The city of Coimbra is about 20 km away.

The current mayor is Rui Marqueiro, elected by the Socialist Party. The municipal holiday is Ascension Day.

== Demographics ==
Population of Mealhada's Municipality (1801–2011)
1801	1849	1900	1930	1960	1981	1991	2001	2004	2011
2326	7102	9915	13869	17478	19305	18272	20751	21500	20428

== Parishes ==
Administratively, the municipality is divided into 6 civil parishes (freguesias):

- Barcouço
- Casal Comba
- Luso
- Mealhada, Ventosa do Bairro e Antes
- Pampilhosa
- Vacariça

== Cities and towns ==
- Mealhada (city) / [cidade] .
- Towns: Luso; Pampilhosa

== Villages ==
(Partial list):

- Antes
- Barcouco
- Buçaco
- Casal Comba
- Mala
- Travasso
- Vacarica
- Ventosa do Bairro
- Vimieira

== Attractions ==
The Buçaco Palace (Portuguese: Palácio Hotel do Buçaco) is a luxury hotel in the Luso parish, in the municipality of Mealhada, in the Serra do Buçaco mountains. Other interesting sights near Luso: Cruz Alta, a dense wooded forest.

Other attractions: Mealhada: City Park (Parque da Cidade de Mealhada).

== Principal train stations ==
The most important train stations are: Pampilhosa, Mealhada and Luso.
