= Red beech =

Red beech is a common name applied to several species of trees:

- Dillenia alata, native to Northern Australia and New Guinea
- Nothofagus fusca, native to New Zealand
- Protorhus longifolia, native to South Africa
