= Serra do Buçaco =

Mountain range in Portugal

Serra do Bussaco
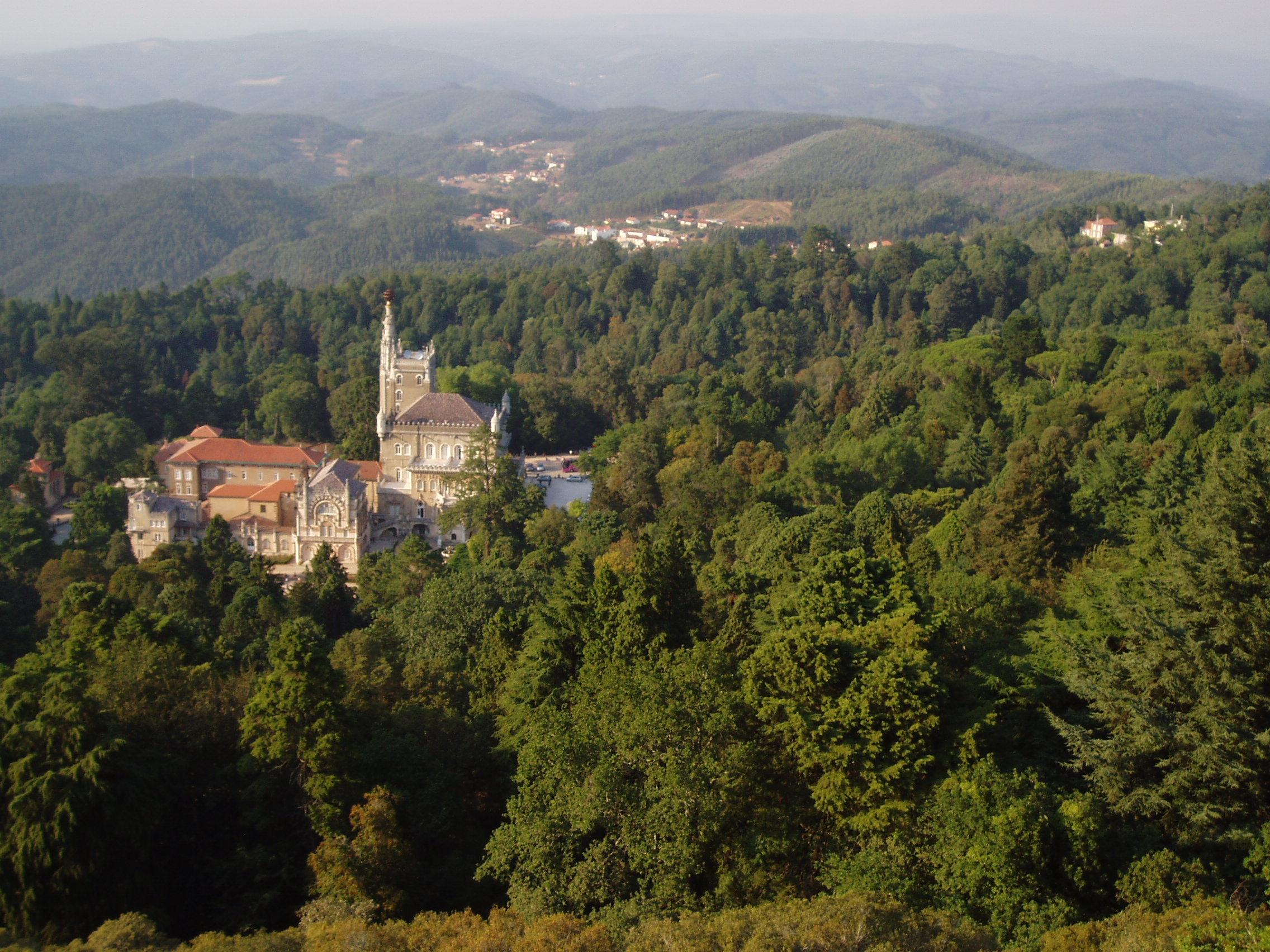
- Mountains and National Palace of Bussaco

Highest point
- Coordinates: 40°21′N 8°21′W

Geography
- Location within Portugal
- Country: Portugal
- Region: Centro

Serra do Bussaco (pronounced [buˈsaku]) is a mountain range in Portugal, formerly included in the province of Beira Litoral. The highest point in the range is the Cruz Alta at 549 metres (1,801 ft), which has views over the Serra da Estrela, the Mondego River valley and the Atlantic Ocean.

In 2026, the Bussaco National Forest (Mata Nacional do Bussaco) received international certification as a 'therapeutic forest', thus becoming the first site of its kind certified on the Iberian Peninsula and the fourth worldwide.

== History ==
The Serra includes the buildings of a secularized Carmelite monastery, founded in 1628. The convent woods have long been known for their cypress, plane, evergreen oak, cork and other forest trees, many of which have stood for centuries and attained an immense size. A bull of Pope Gregory XV (1623), anathematizing trespassers and forbidding women to approach, is inscribed on a tablet at the main entrance; another bull, of Pope Urban VIII (1643), threatens with excommunication any person harming the trees. Located in the northwestern corner is the Mata Nacional do Bussaco (Bussaco Forest), an ancient walled arboretum.

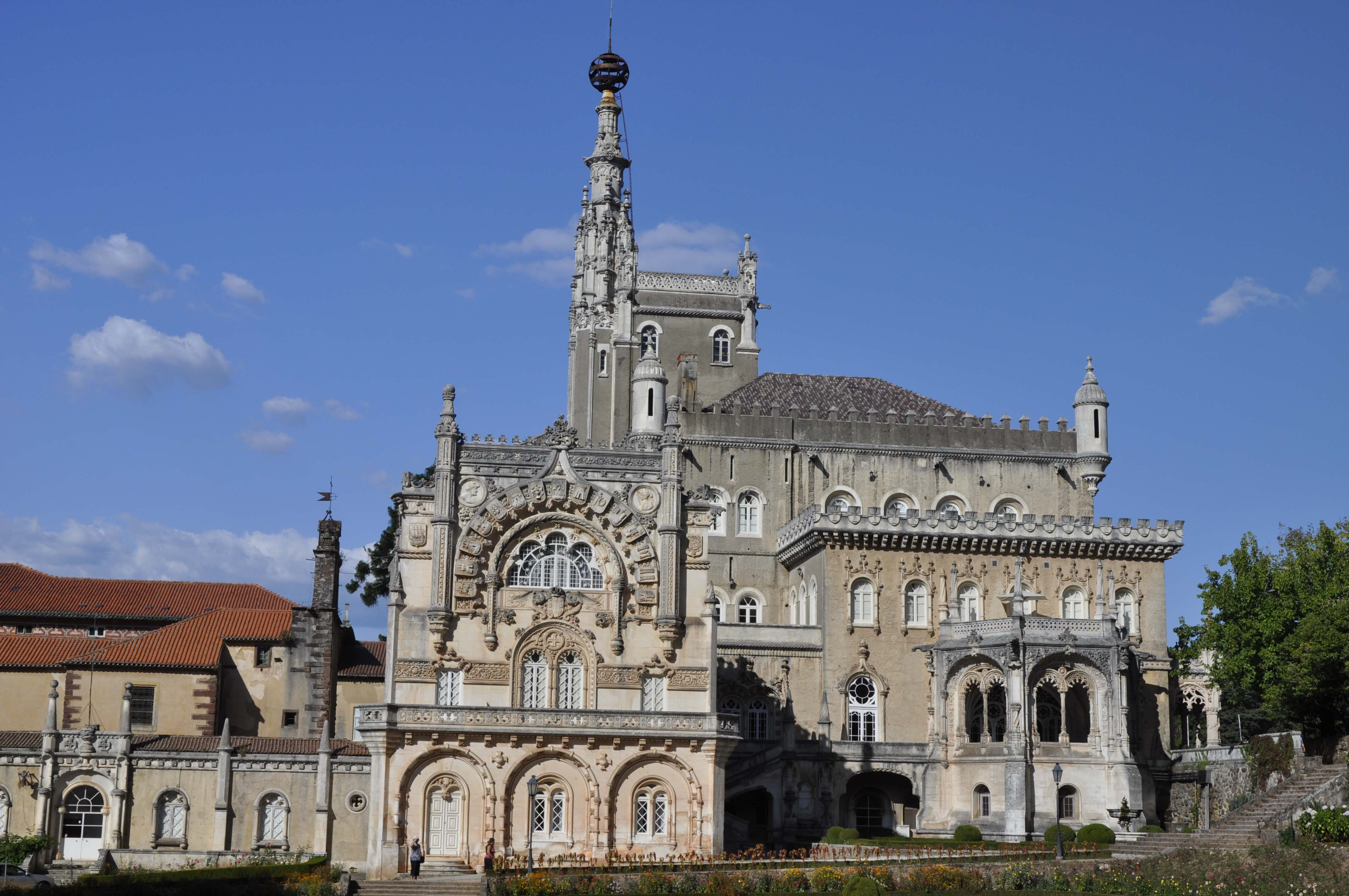
Palácio Hotel do Buçaco

Towards the close of the 19th century the Serra de Bussaco became one of the regular halting-places for foreign, and especially for British, tourists, on the overland route between Lisbon and Porto. The Palace Hotel of Bussaco (Palácio Hotel do Bussaco), built between 1888 and 1905 in an exuberant Neo-Manueline style, still attracts tourists.

In 1873 a monument was erected, on the southern slopes of the Serra, to commemorate the Battle of Bussaco, in which the French, under Marshal Masséna, were defeated by the Anglo-Portuguese Army, under Lord Wellington, on 27 September 1810.

== Therapeutic forest ==
In July 2026, the Bussaco National Forest (Mata Nacional do Bussaco) received international certification as a 'therapeutic forest', awarded on 17 July by the International Certification Office Healing Forest. It became the first site of its kind certified on the Iberian Peninsula and the fourth worldwide, joining the Benedictine Abbey of Göttweig in Austria and two German sites, Lahnstein and Bad Nauheim. The certificate is valid until 2031, after which the site must undergo a reassessment. The designation recognizes natural areas managed for wellness and forest-therapy programs supervised by certified specialists, a practice inspired by the Japanese concept of shinrin-yoku ('forest bathing').

== Sources ==
- St Louis, Regis; Landon, Robert (2007). "Serra do Buçaco". Lonely Planet Portugal.
- Porter, Darwin; Prince, Danforth (6 March 2012). Frommer's Portugal (22nd ed.). Frommer's. ISBN 978-1118086056. "By car from Coimbra, head northeast along Route 110 to the town of Penacova at the foot of the Serra do Buçaco. From there, continue north, following signposts along a small secondary road."
- Rodrigues, Diana Rosa (27 July 2026). "There are only four certified 'therapeutic forests' in the world. One is now in Portugal". Euronews.
