= Bernarda de Lacerda =

Portuguese scholar, writer and playwright

Bernarda Ferreira de Lacerda (c. 1595–1644) was a Portuguese scholar, writer and playwright. She was born in Porto in about 1595 and died in 1644, and was celebrated in verse by both Manuel de Gallegos and Lope de Vega, suggesting that she was highly regarded as a poet by her male peers.

Vieira Mendes describes Bernarda as the daughter of the chancellor of Portugal, Inácio Ferreira Leitão. She published the first part of Hespaña Libertada, dedicated to Felipe III, in 1618, and Soledades de Bucaco in Lisbon in 1634. The second part of Hespaña Libertada was published in 1673 by her daughter, Maria Clara de Meneses. Bernarda Ferreira de la Cerda is also recorded as entering poems in two poetic jousts: Montalban 1636, folios 42, 46, and 137, and Grande de Tena, folio 134v.

She is memorialized in The Dinner Party by Judy Chicago.
