= Luso (Mealhada) =

- Civil parish
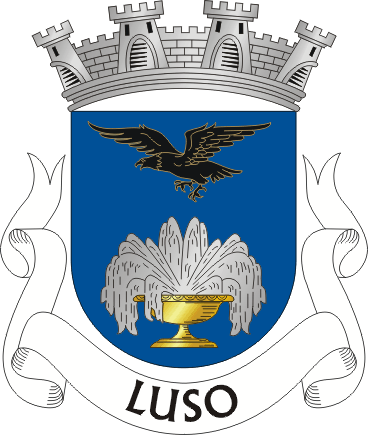
- Coat of arms

- Location in Portugal
- Coordinates: 40.384°N 8.377°W
- Country: Portugal
- Region: Centro
- Intermunic. comm.: Região de Coimbra
- District: Aveiro
- Municipality: Mealhada

Area
  - Total: 16.87 km^{2} (6.51 sq mi)

Population (2011)
  - Total: 2,593
  - Density: 150/km^{2} (400/sq mi)
- Time zone: UTC+00:00 (WET)
  - Summer (DST): UTC+01:00 (WEST)

Luso is a civil parish of the municipality of Mealhada, Aveiro district, Portugal. The population in 2011 was 2,593, in an area of 16.87 km^{2}. It is renowned for its mineral waters. Águas do Luso, one of the largest Portuguese companies providing mineral water is based there.
