= Buçaco Palace =

Buçaco Palace Hotel
- Palácio Hotel do Buçaco
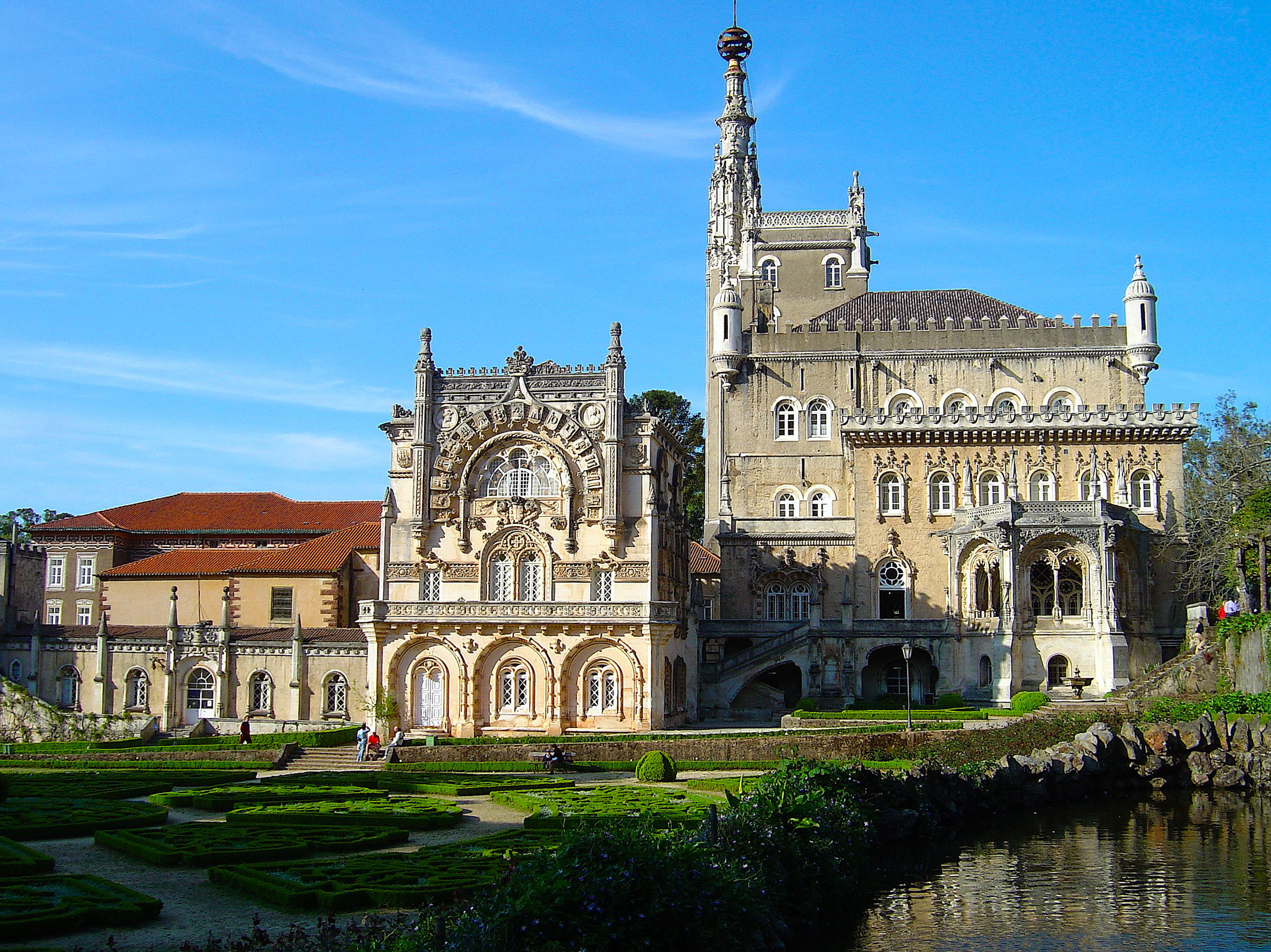
- General view of the Palace Hotel do Buçaco.
- Interactive map of the Buçaco Palace Hotel area
- Hotel chain: Hotéis Alexandre de Almeida

General information
- Type: Palace
- Architectural style: Neo-Manueline
- Location: Mealhada, Portugal
- Coordinates: 40°22′33.74″N 8°21′55.62″W
- Construction started: 1888
- Completed: 1907

Portuguese National Monument
- Type: Non-movable
- Criteria: National Monument
- Designated: 15 June 2018
- Reference no.: IPA.00005687

The Buçaco Palace is a former convent that today houses a luxury hotel located in the Buçaco mountain range, in the municipality of Mealhada, in central Portugal. It is a national monument.

== History ==
The area around the Buçaco Palace was part of a Discalced Carmelite convent established in 1628. The monks of the Convento de Santa Cruz do Buçaco not only built a convent but also created a luxurious garden with many species of trees. The garden was supposed to represent Mount Carmel (where the order was founded) and the Earthly Paradise. Date from the late 17th century a series of chapels with representations of a Via Crucis in the garden. Part of the convent, including the church with Baroque altarpieces, is still preserved beside the palace. At the entrance of the old convent, there is a plaque to the Battle of Bussaco which commemorates the fact that Viscount Wellington, who later became the Duke of Wellington, spent the night in the convent after the battle on 27 September 1810. The Carmelites left Buçaco in 1834 century following the dissolution of the monasteries in Portugal.

=== Palace Hotel ===
Late in the century there were plans to turn the ancient convent into a royal residence for Queen Maria Pia, wife of King Luís I. However, difficult political circumstances soon led to the decision to turn the palace into a hotel.

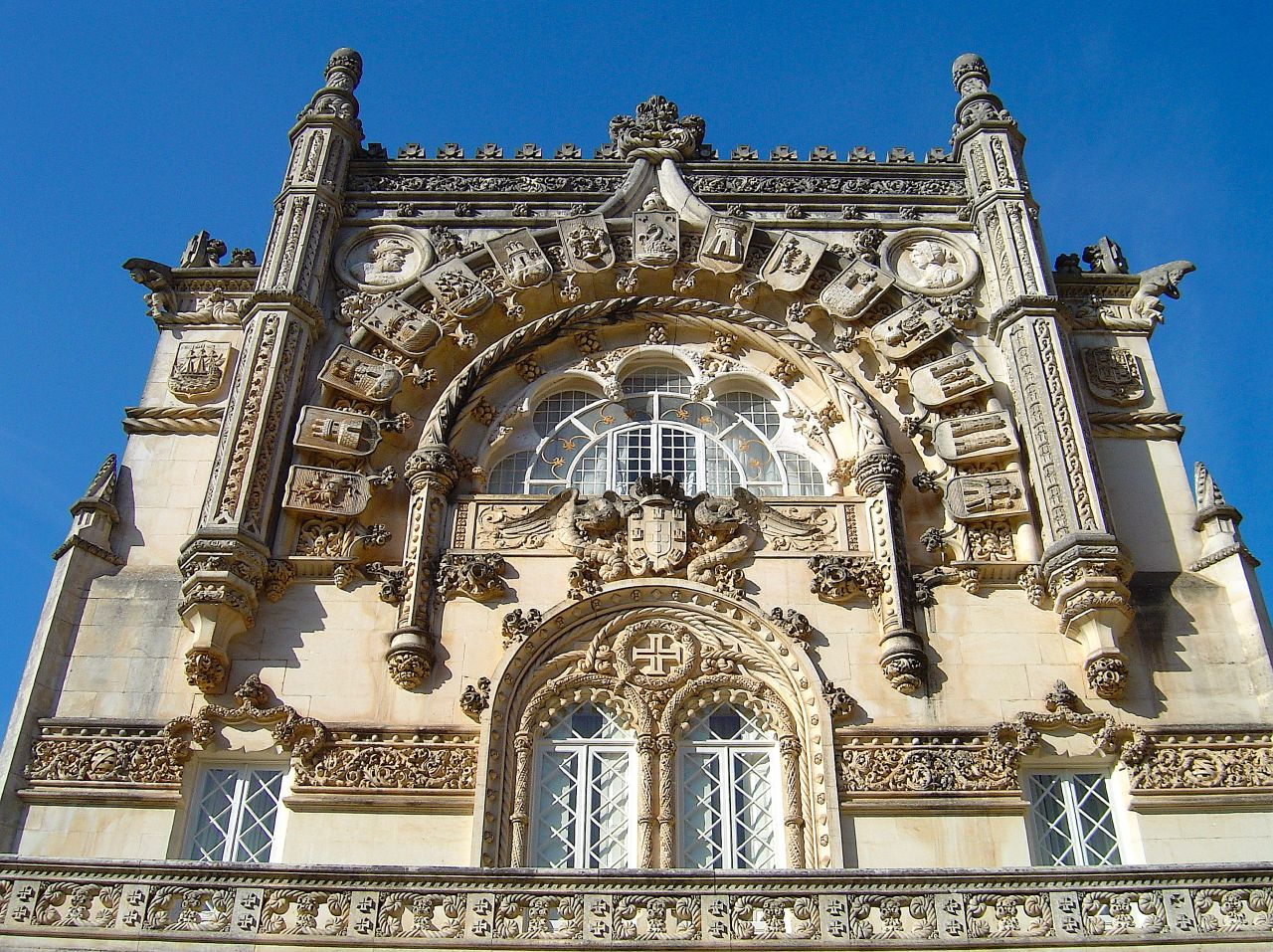
Detail of the Neo-Manueline façade of Palace Hotel of Bussaco (Casa dos Brasões).

The Palace Hotel of Buçaco was built between 1888 and 1907. The first architect was the Italian Luigi Manini (1848–1936), who designed a Romantic palace in Neo-Manueline style, evoking the 16th-century architectural style that characterised the peak of the Portuguese Age of Discovery. The Buçaco Palace is inspired in iconic Manueline buildings like the Jerónimos Monastery and the Belém Tower, both located in Lisbon.

Manini was succeeded by Nicola Bigaglia, José Alexandre Soares and Manuel Joaquim Norte Júnior, the latter responsible for the annex Casa dos Brasões (House of the Coat-of-Arms). The inner rooms are richly decorated with Neo-Manueline portals and stucco work imitating Manueline rib vaulting, being also an important showcase of Portuguese painting and sculpture of the early 20th century. The inner walls are also decorated with tile (azulejo) panels by Jorge Colaço. These panels depict scenes taken from Portuguese literature as well as historical events like the Battle of Bussaco.
