= Neo-Manueline =

Style of Portuguese architecture

Neo-Manueline buildings in
Europe, the Americas, & Africa
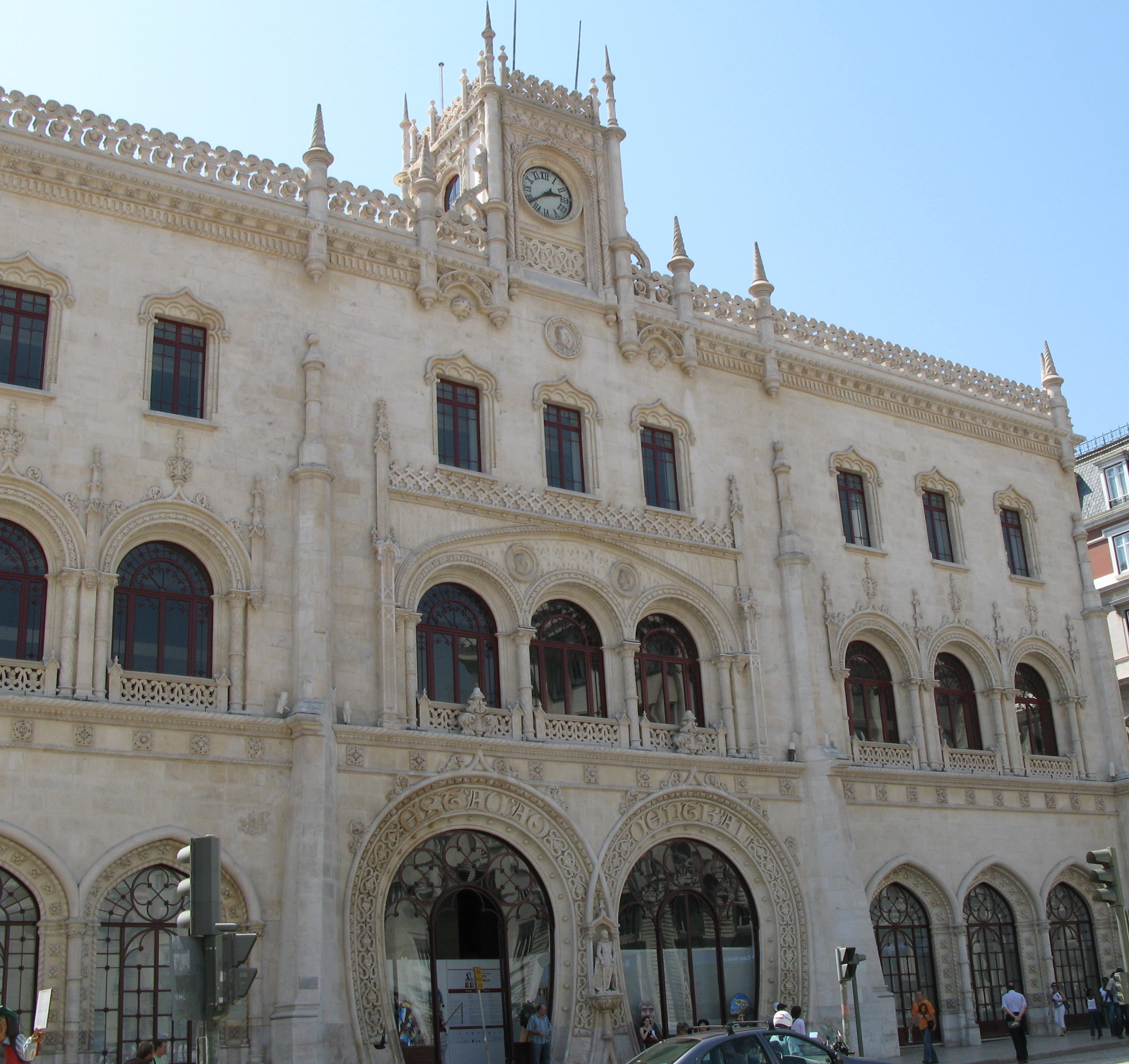
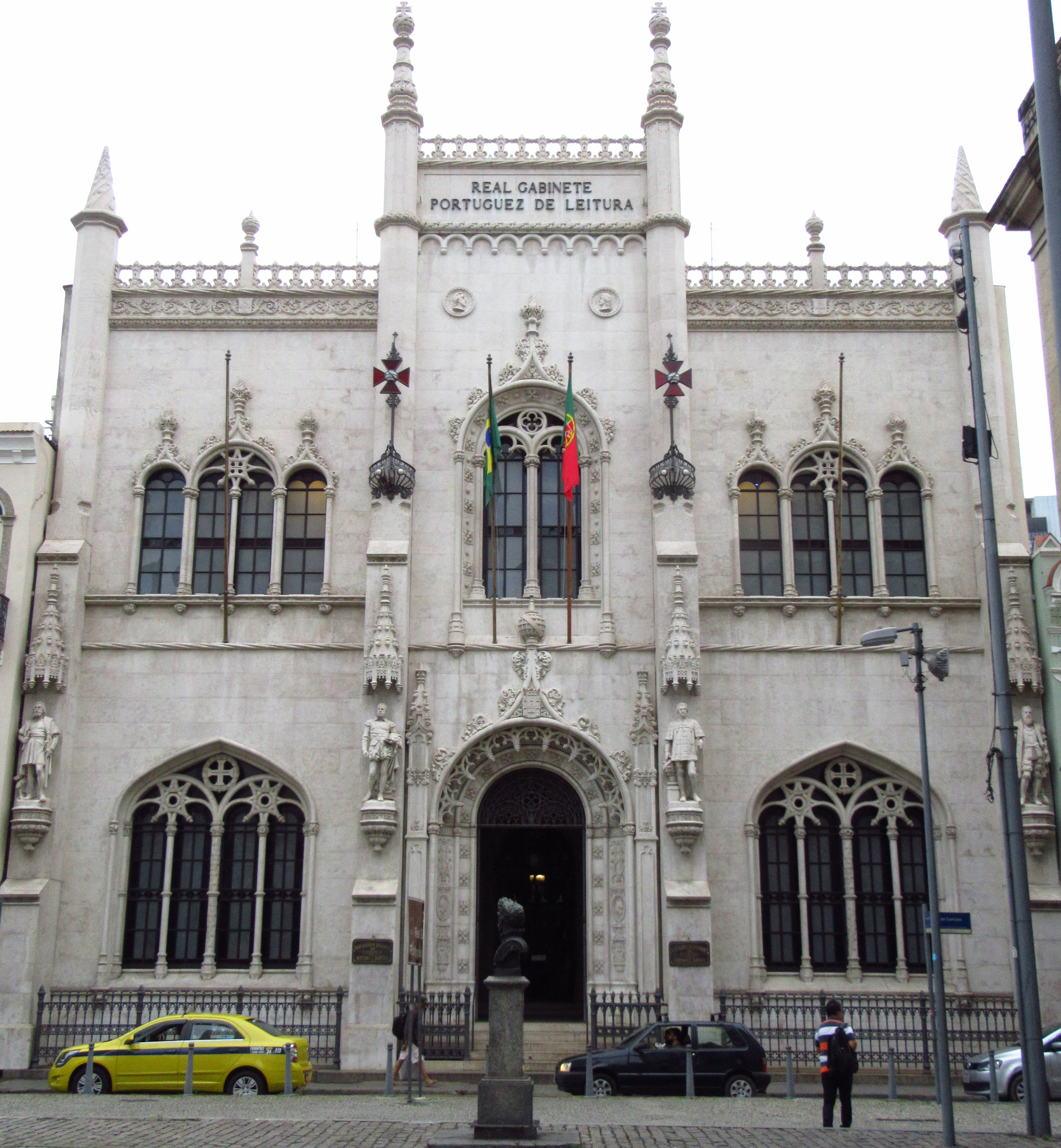
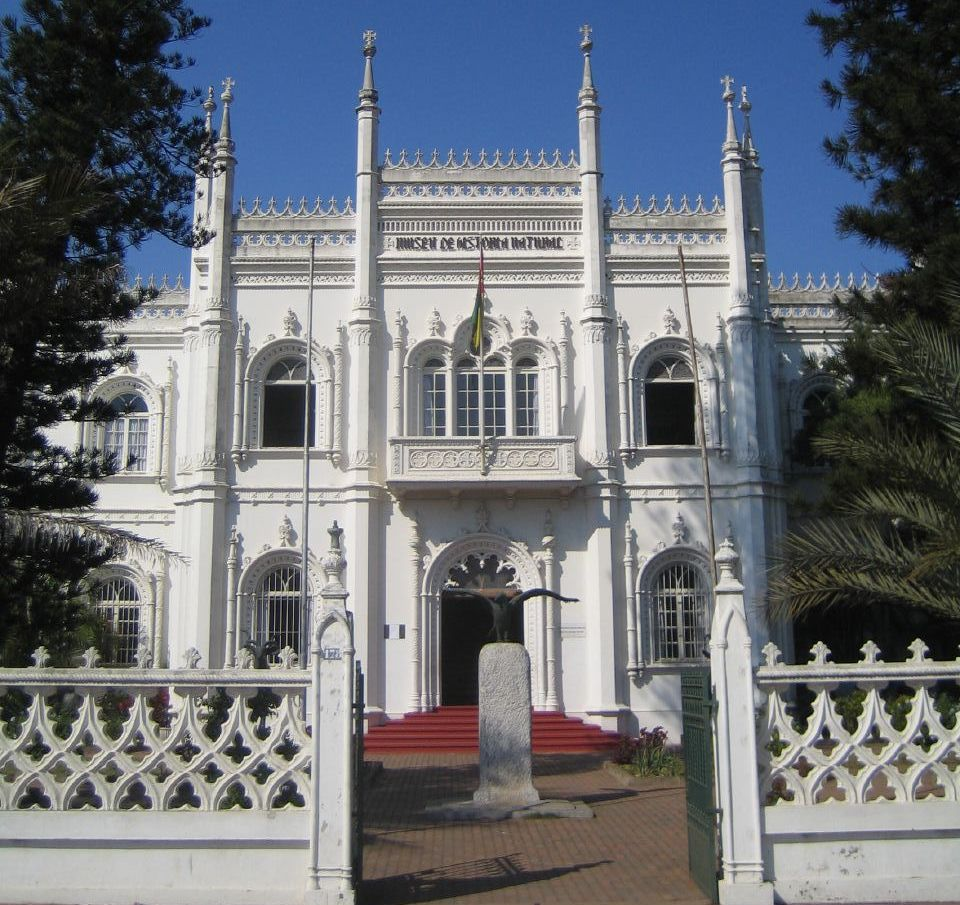
Rossio Railway Station, Lisbon (top); Real Gabinete Português de Leitura, Rio de Janeiro (middle); National Museum of Natural History, Maputo (bottom).

Neo-Manueline is a revival style of architecture which drew from the 16th century Manueline Late Gothic architecture of Portugal. Neo-Manueline constructions have been built across Portugal, Brazil, and the Lusophone world (the former Portuguese Empire).

== History ==
The term manuelino was introduced in 1842 by Brazilian art historian Francisco Adolfo de Varnhagen to designate the exuberant artistic style that developed during the reign of Manuel I of Portugal (1495–1521). The Manueline style coincided with the Age of Discovery and the peak of Portuguese maritime power. In the sequence of the Gothic Revival architecture fashion that spread for all over Europe since the middle of the 18th century, the Manueline style was considered the most authentic Portuguese architectural style.

Neo-Manueline started with the construction of the Pena Palace in Sintra by Ferdinand II between 1839 and 1849. Another pioneering project was the restoration of the Jerónimos Monastery in Lisbon during the 1860s, in which the Manueline monastery gained a new tower and annexes built in Neo-Manueline style (which now house the Maritime Museum and the National Archaeology Museum). During this time the iconic Belém Tower was also restored with several Neo-Manueline additions. Other important Neo-Manueline buildings in Portugal are Rossio Railway Station, Lisbon (1886–90), Palace Hotel of Bussaco (1888–1907), the Sintra Town Hall (1906–09), the Counts of Castro Guimarães Palace in Cascais (1900) and the Quinta da Regaleira in Sintra (1904–10). The Neo-Manueline was also used in smaller buildings like private houses.

Neo-Manueline eventually spread to the colonies and former Portuguese colonies. In Brazil, there are several Neo-Manueline buildings, usually built by Portuguese associations. The most important of these is the Real Gabinete Português de Leitura (Royal Portuguese Library), built between 1880 and 1887 by Portuguese immigrants in the centre of Rio de Janeiro. Other Manueline buildings in Brazil include the Portuguese Center in Santos (Centro Português de Santos, 1898–1901), the Portuguese Library of Bahia (1915–18) and the Portuguese Literary Liceum (Liceu Literário Português) in Rio de Janeiro (1938).

Examples of Neo-Manueline buildings can also be found in African and Asian territories of the former Portuguese Colonial Empire.

There are also examples of buildings influenced by the Neo-Manueline style in countries that were not directly related with the Portuguese culture. A fine example is the Arseny Morozov House (1895–99) in Moscow, Russia.

== Gallery ==
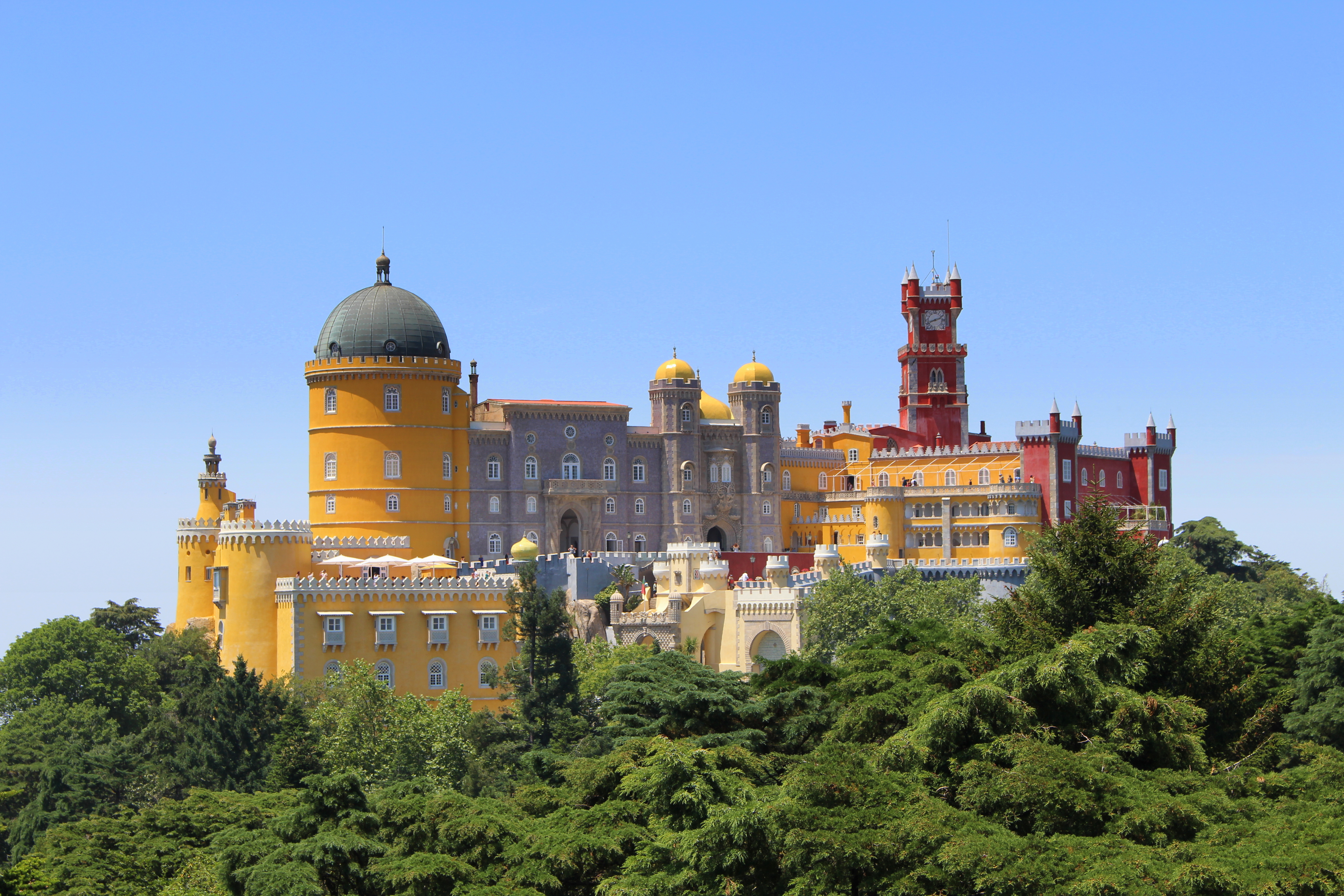
Pena Palace in Sintra, Portugal.

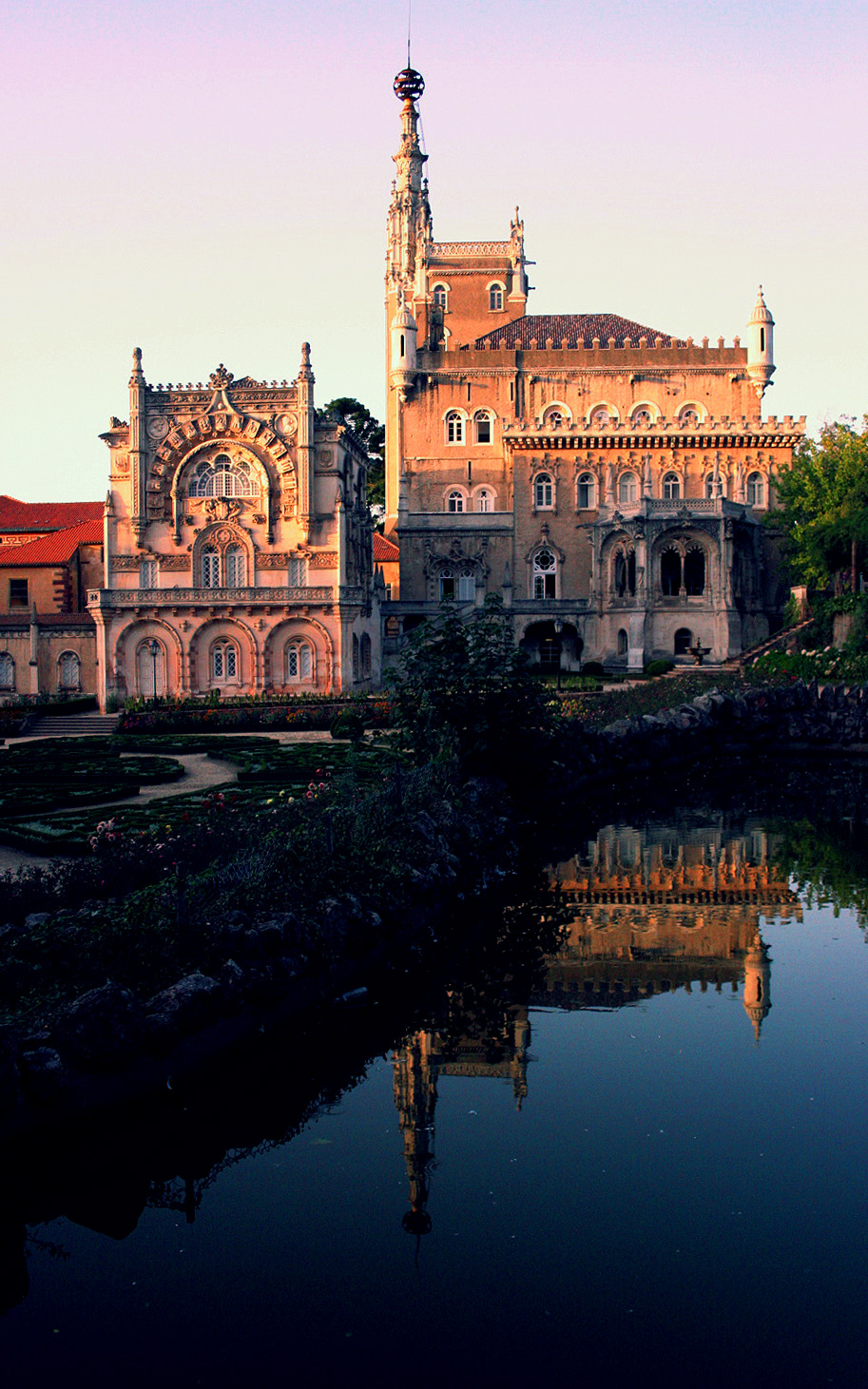
Buçaco Palace Hotel in Serra do Buçaco, Portugal

Quinta da Regaleira in Sintra, Portugal

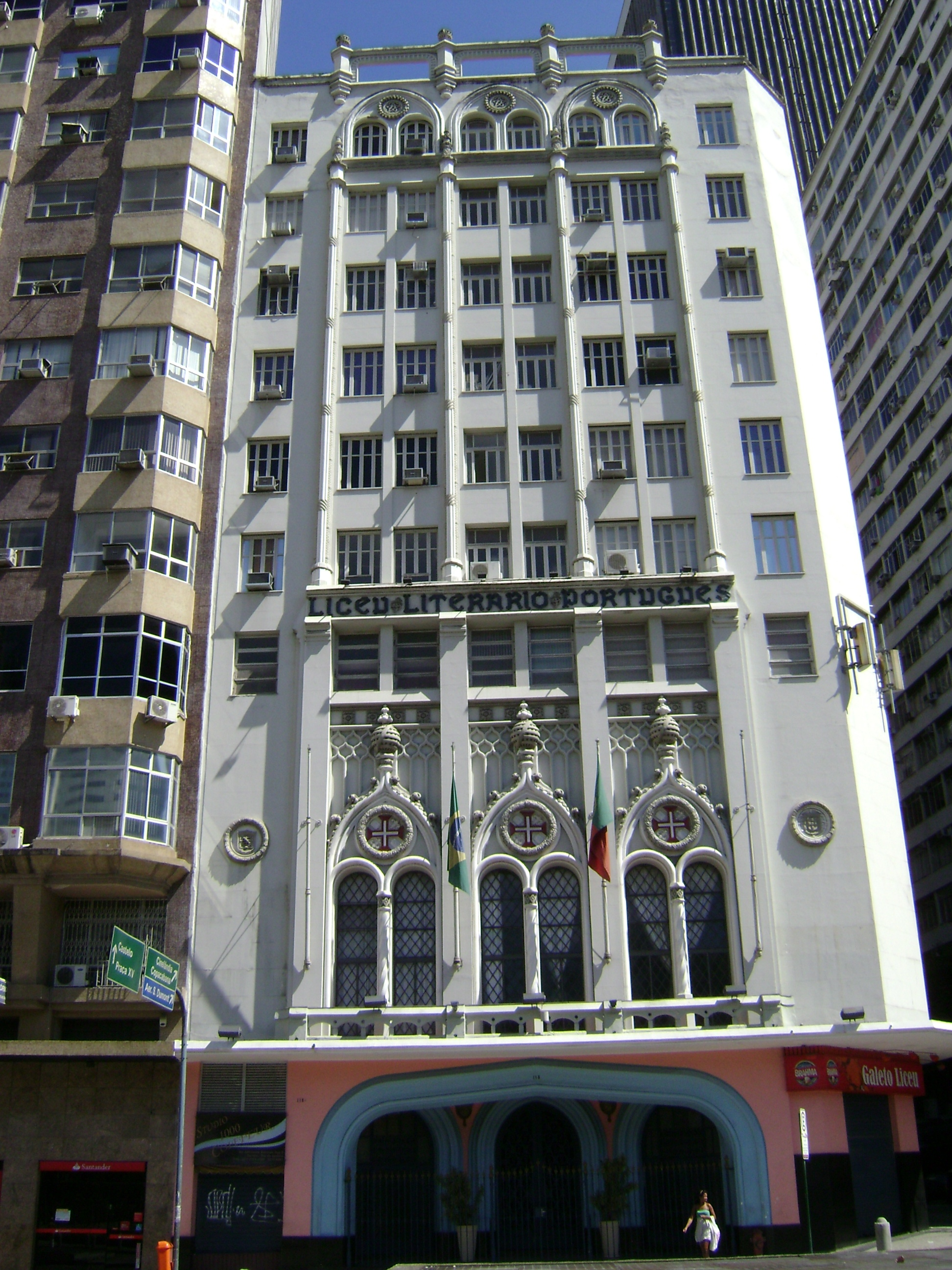
Liceu Literário Português in Rio de Janeiro, Brazil

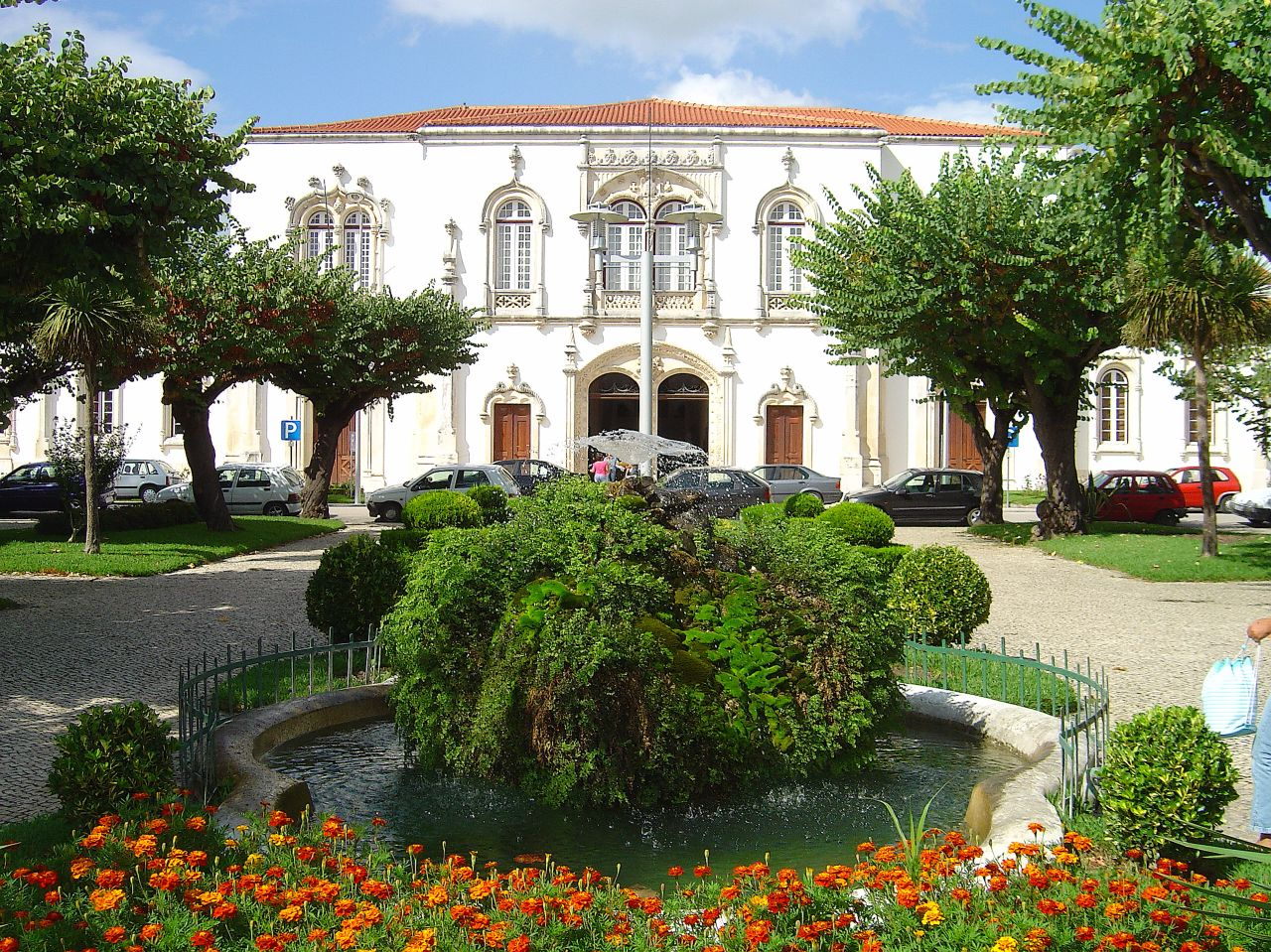
Soure Town Hall in Soure, Portugal

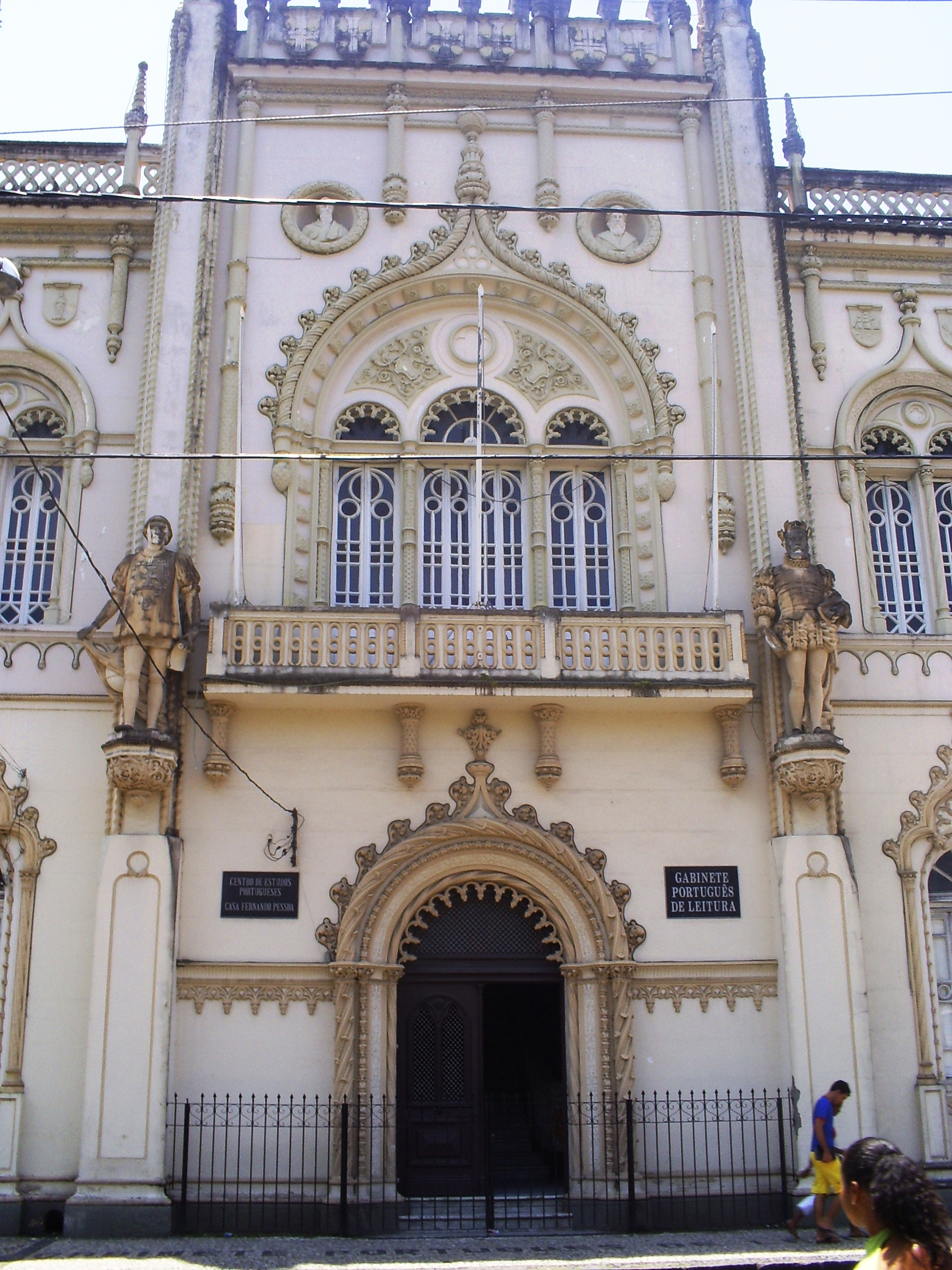
Gabinete Português de Leitura in Bahia, Brazil

Counts of Castro Guimarães Palace in Cascais, Portugal

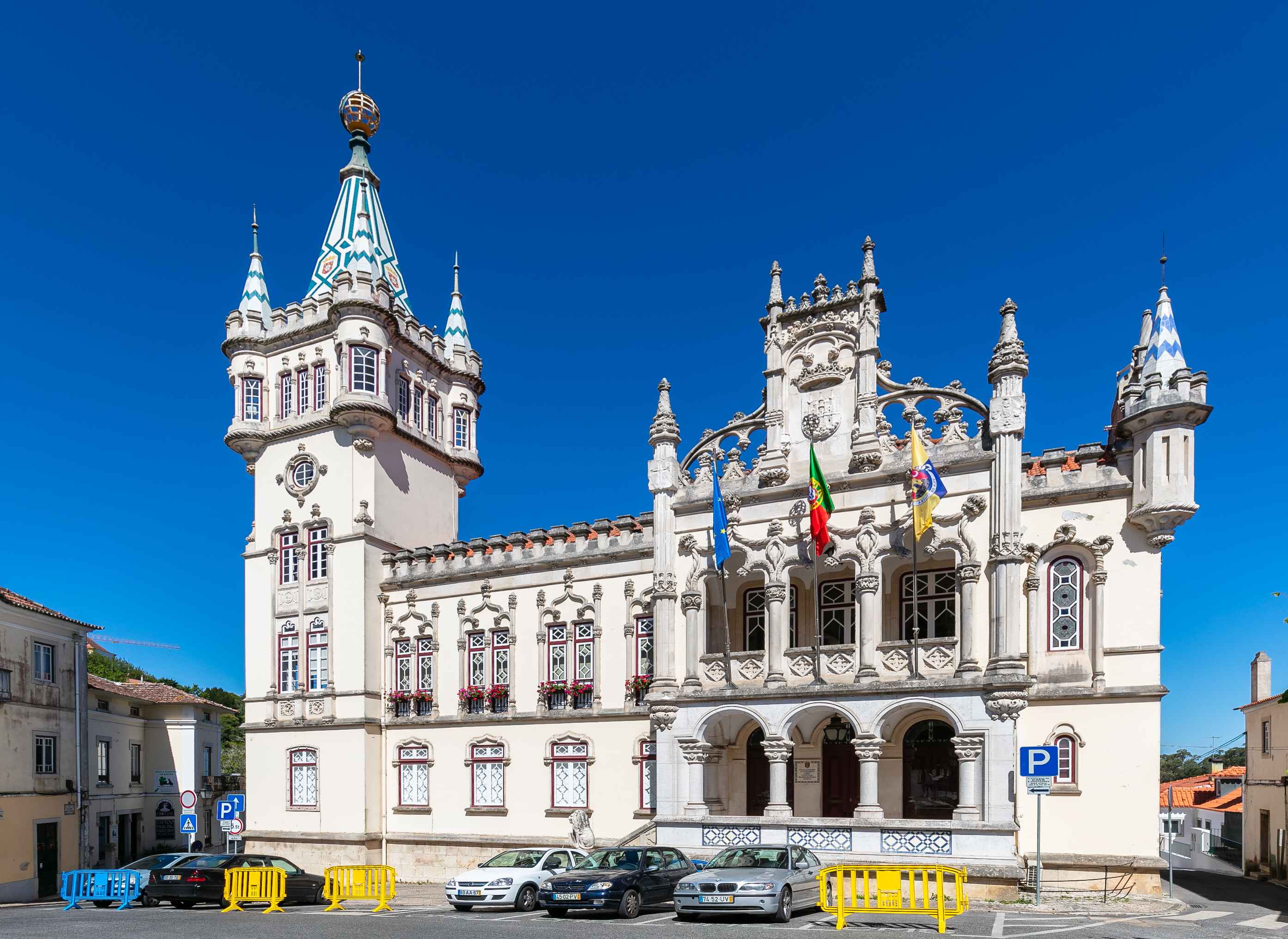
Sintra Town Hall in Sintra, Portugal

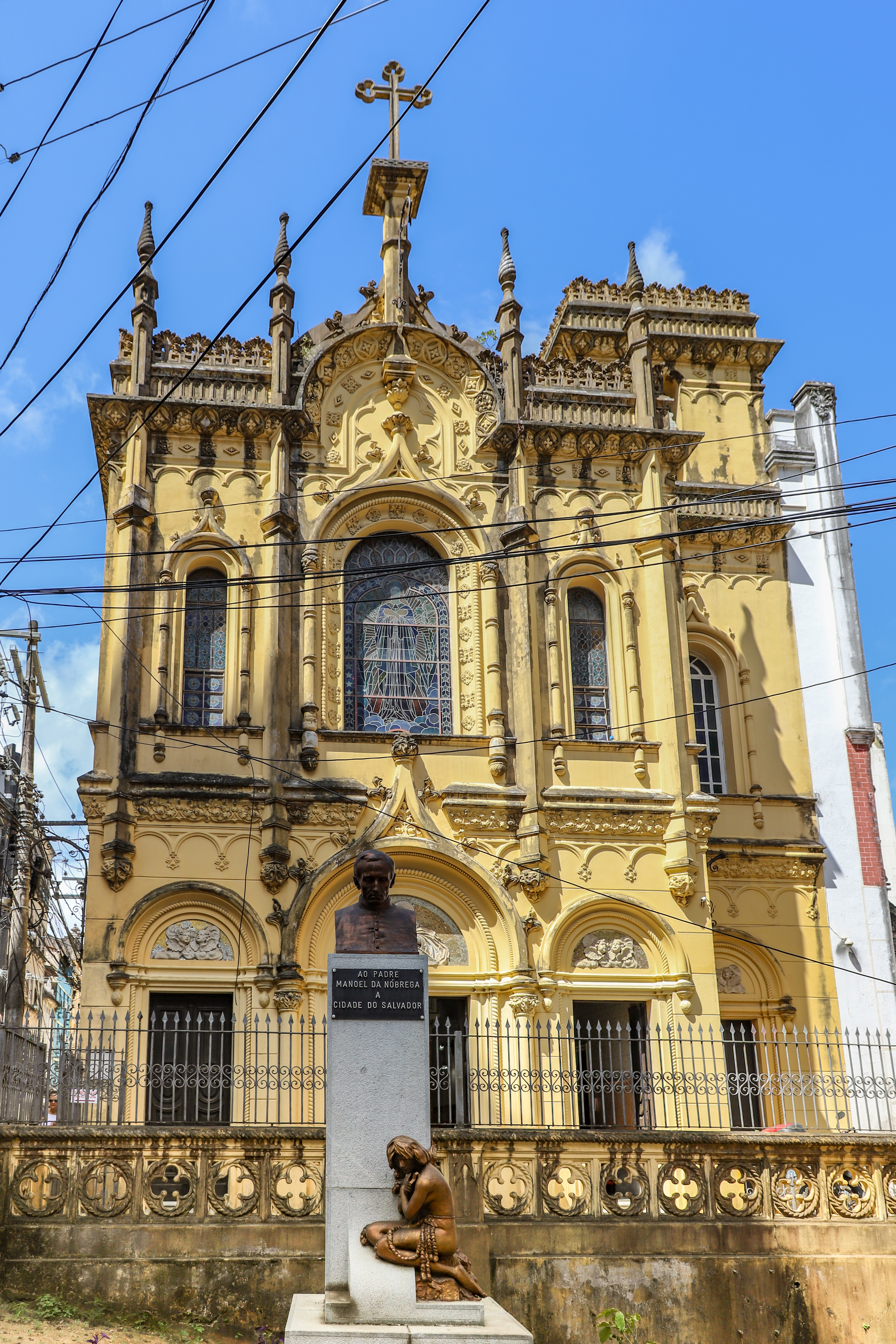
Chapel of Our Lady of Help in Salvador, Bahia, Brazil

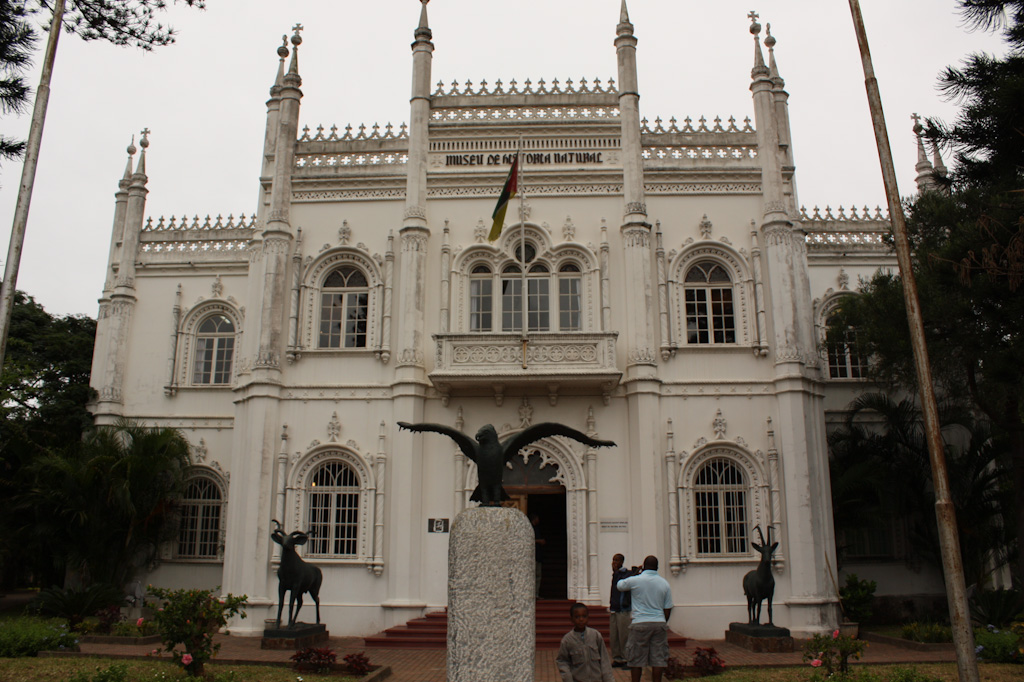
Natural History Museum in Maputo, Mozambique

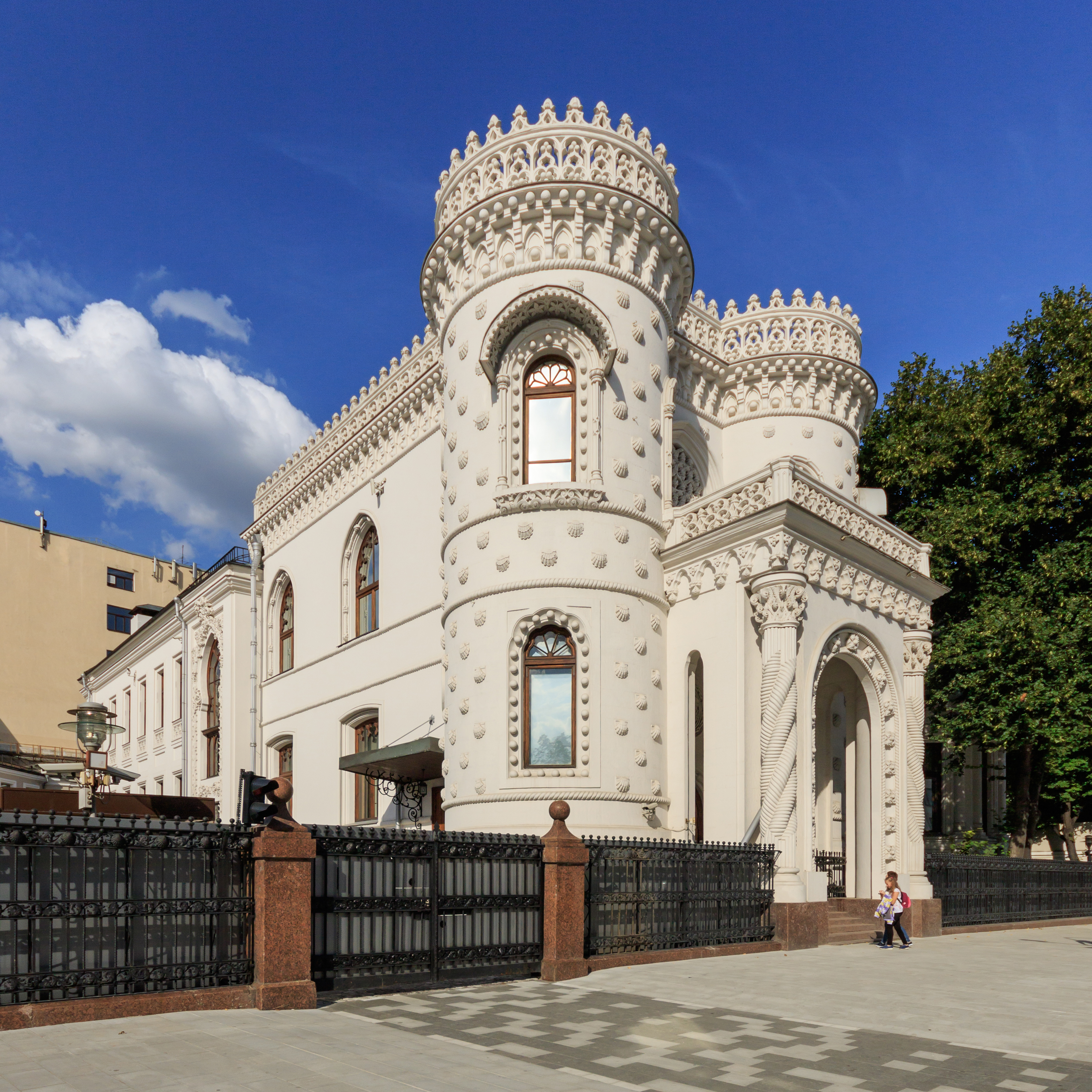
Morozov Palace in Moscow, Russia

== See also ==
- List of architectural styles
- Portuguese Architecture
