= Dissolution of the monasteries in Portugal =

The dissolution of the monasteries in Portugal was the nationalization of the property of male monastic orders effected by a decree of 28 May 1834 enacted by Joaquim António de Aguiar at the conclusion of the Portuguese Civil War. Portugal thus terminated the state sanction of male religious orders, and nationalized the lands and possessions of over 500 monasteries. The new government hoped to re-distribute land and property among the poorer landowners, but there were few who could buy.

== Background ==
Although monasteries in Portugal are historically seen to have been crucial centres of religious and intellectual life, they were not immune to controversy. For one, beginning in the 17th century, there was already some emerging concern about the effects that the surge in novices had on the Portuguese economy. There was also a growing distance between the monasteries and secular political life which furthered their controversial status in the country.

The suppression of the monasteries can be traced back to the 17th century when smaller monasteries were forced to dissolve so that their finances could be consolidated into the larger branches of their congregations. This pattern was mainly driven by the enthusiasm for renewal engendered by the formation of the Autonomous Congregation of Alcobaça; however, the situation for smaller monasteries worsened after the 1755 Lisbon Earthquake. This earthquake destroyed a number of Portuguese monasteries, necessitating mass construction projects to rebuild them. Rather than focus on rebuilding all the monasteries, the Portuguese monarchy decided to focus on further consolidating the resources of larger monasteries such as the College of Conceição. This established a precedent which gave the Portuguese government full authority to reform, dissolve, and consolidate Cistercian monasteries at will.

== Decree and reaction ==
The decree was issued in the name of Joaquim Antinio d'Aguiar on 28 May 1834. Pope Gregory XVI condemned the action and other anti-church measures in an allocution issued on 1 August 1834, Cum pro pastorali.

== See also ==
- History of Portugal (1834–1910)
- History of Catholicism in Portugal
- Joaquim António de Aguiar
- Religion in Portugal
- Suppression of monasteries, elsewhere in Europe.
