= Merrick (surname) =

Merrick or Merick is a surname. Notable people with the surname include:

== Arts and entertainment ==
- Bryn Merrick (1958–2015), British guitarist with The Damned
- David Merrick (1911–2000), American theatre producer
- Doris Merrick (1919–2019), American actress
- Elizabeth Merrick (born c. 1973), American writer and publisher
- Frank Merrick (1886–1981), English pianist
- Gordon Merrick (1916–1988), gay American writer and actor
- Jerry Merrick, American singer-songwriter
- James Merrick (1720–1769), English poet
- Leonard Merrick (1864-1939), English novelist
- Linda Merrick (born 1963), British clarinettist
- Lynn Merrick (1919–2007), American Actress
- Sarah Newcomb Merrick (1844–?), Canadian-American teacher, writer, businessperson, physician, inventor
- Thom Merrick (born 1963), American artist
- Will Merrick (born 1993), English screen and stage actor
- Zack Merrick (born 1988), bassist in the band All Time Low

== Business ==
- George E. Merrick (1886–1942), real estate developer of Coral Gables, Florida
- John Merrick (insurance) (1859–1919), African-American founder of North Carolina Mutual & Provident Insurance Company
- Samuel Vaughan Merrick (1801–1870), American manufacturer

== Politics and governance ==
- Ben Merrick, Director of Overseas Territories in the UK Foreign and Commonwealth Office
- Cathy Merrick (1962–2024), Grand Chief of the Assembly of Manitoba Chiefs
- Evalyn Merrick (1953–2026), American politician from New Hampshire
- Henry Merrick (1837–?), Canadian politician
- John Merrick (fl. ca. 1596–1621), English ambassador to Russia
- Raymond Merrick (born 1939), member of the Kansas senate
- Scott Merrick (born 1985), member of New Hampshire House of Representatives
- William Duhurst Merrick (1793–1857), US senator from Maryland
- William Matthew Merrick (1818–1889), United States Circuit Court judge and congressman from Maryland
- John Merrick (MP) (1584–1659), politician and soldier

== Sports ==
- Alan Merrick (born 1950), English association football player who played in the USA
- Bob Merrick (1893–1981), Australian rules footballer
- Ed Merrick, American football coach of the University of Richmond Spiders
- Ernie Merrick (born 1953), Scottish association football manager
- Gil Merrick (1922–2010), English association football goalkeeper and manager
- John Merrick (golfer) (b.orn 1982), American golfer
- Wayne Merrick (born 1952), Canadian ice hockey player
- Merrick Elderton (1884–1939), English cricketer

== Other ==
- A. W. Merrick (1840–1902), American journalist
- Anne Morrissy Merick (1933–2017), pioneering American journalist
- Christene Merick (1916–2008), American philanthropist
- Joseph Merrick (1862–1890), English man with severe deformities known as the "Elephant Man"
- Joseph Merrick (missionary) (1808–1849), Jamaican missionary to Cameroon
- Mary Virginia Merrick (1866–1955), American social reformer
- Richard T. Merrick (1828–1885), American lawyer
- Suds Merrick (died 1884), New York criminal
