= Meyrick =

Meyrick is a surname and a masculine given name. Meyricke is a variant form.

== Surname ==
- Denzil Meyrick (1965–2025), Scottish novelist
- Edmund Meyrick (1636–1713), Welsh cleric
- Edward Meyrick (1854–1938), English schoolmaster and amateur entomologist
- Edward Meyrick Goulburn (1818–1897), English churchman
- Frederick Meyrick (1827–1906), Church of England clergyman and author
- Gelli Meyrick (1556?–1601), Welsh supporter of Robert Devereux, 2nd Earl of Essex, and conspirator in Essex's rebellion
- John Meyrick (ambassador) (c.1559–1638/9), English ambassador to Russia
- John Meyrick (bishop) (1538–1599), English Anglican bishop
- John Meyrick (politician) (1674–?), Welsh politician and judge
- Jonathan Meyrick (born 1952), British Anglican bishop and dean
- Kate Meyrick (1875–1933), Irish night club owner
- Maurice Meyricke (c. 1563–1640), Welsh academic
- Rowland Meyrick (1505–1566), Welsh bishop
- Samuel Rush Meyrick (1783–1848), English inventor
- Sidney Meyrick (1879–1973), Royal Navy officer
- William Meyrick (1808–1846), English cricketer

== Given name ==
- Meyrick Alexander (born 1952), British bassoonist
- Meyrick Booth (1883–1968), British educational psychologist
- Meyrick Edward Clifton James (1898–1963), English actor and soldier
- Meyrick Pringle (born 1966), South African cricketer

== See also ==
- Merrick (disambiguation)
- Meyrick family
- Meyrick Park
- Mynydd William Meyrick
