= John Meyrick =

John Meyrick may also refer to:

- John Meyrick (rower) (1926–2004), British agriculturist and rower
- John Meyrick (bishop) (1538–1599), Anglican clergyman
- John Meyrick (politician) (born 1674), Welsh politician and judge
- John Meyrick (ambassador), English ambassador to Russia

== See also ==
- John Merrick (disambiguation)
- Jonathan Meyrick (born 1952), Bishop of Lynn
