= Merrick =

Merrick may refer to:

== Places ==
=== America ===
- Merrick, New York, a hamlet and census-designated place
- Merrick, West Springfield, a neighborhood in western Massachusetts
- Merrick County, Nebraska
- Merrick State Park, Wisconsin
- Merrick Butte, Monument Valley, Arizona

=== Antarctica ===
- Merrick Mountains, Palmer Land, Antarctica
- Merrick Glacier, Oates Land, Antarctica
- Merrick Point, Marie Byrd Land, Antarctica

=== Britain ===
- Merrick (Galloway), a mountain in southern Scotland
- Wigtown Area, a former district of Scotland which was going to be named "Merrick"

== People ==
- Merrick (surname)
- Merrick (given name)
- Chris Hughes (musician) (born 1954), also known as Merrick, British record producer and musician

== Arts and entertainment ==
- Merrick Mayfair, a character in The Vampire Chronicles series by Anne Rice
  - Merrick (novel), by Anne Rice
- Merrick Baliton, one of the Wild Force Power Rangers in the Power Rangers universe
- Merrick, Buffy's mentor in the 1992 film Buffy the Vampire Slayer
- Antoc Merrick, a Rebel pilot and general in the film Rogue One: A Star Wars Story
- Bob Merrick, the male lead character in the 1954 film Magnificent Obsession, played by Rock Hudson
- Jackie Merrick, a minor character in the British soap opera Emmerdale Farm
- Trish Merrick, a character in the TV series Jericho

== Other uses ==
- 65672 Merrick, an asteroid
- Merrick Road, known as Merrick Boulevard in New York City
- Merrick station, a Long Island Rail Road station in Merrick, New York
- Merrick Art Gallery, an early private art museum in western Pennsylvania, on the National Register of Historic Places
- USS Merrick (AKA-97), a US Navy attack cargo ship

== See also ==
- Merricks, Victoria, a town in Australia
- Meyrick, a surname and given name
- Meyrick baronets, a title in the Baronetage of the United Kingdom
- Tal Merrik, a senator in the animated TV series Star Wars: The Clone Wars
- Meyrick family, later spelled Merrick
- Marek's disease
