= Anglican Cathedral of the Redeemer =

Cathedral of the Redeemer
- Anglican Cathedral of the Redeemer
- Catedral del Redentor
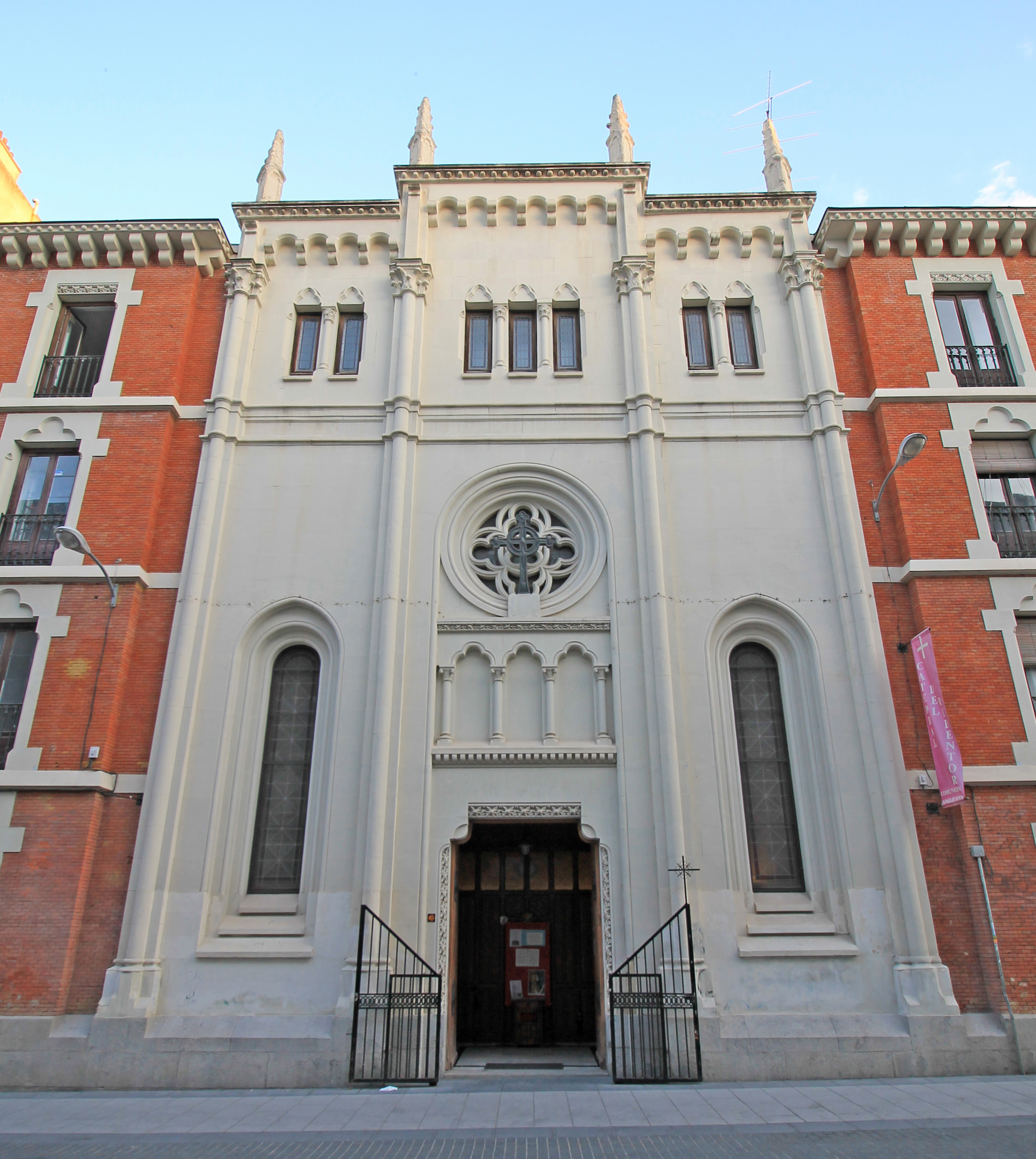
- Façade, view from Calle de la Beneficencia

- Location within Spain
- 40.4263°N 3.6985°W
- Location: Calle de la Beneficencia, 18, Madrid
- Country: Spain
- Denomination: Anglican
- Churchmanship: Low church
- Website: catedralanglicana.es

History
- Status: Cathedral
- Founded: 1869
- Dedication: Christ the Redeemer
- Dedicated: September 1894
- Consecrated: 1893

Architecture
- Functional status: Active
- Architect: Enrique Repullés Segarra
- Style: Gothic Revival
- Groundbreaking: 1891
- Completed: 1893

Specifications
- Materials: Cement, brick and stone

Administration
- Province: Extra-provincial
- Diocese: Spain

Clergy
- Bishop: Carlos López Lozano
- Dean: Vacant
- Priest: Aloysi Busquets

The Cathedral of the Redeemer (Spanish: Catedral Anglicana del Redentor) is a Protestant (Anglican) church in Madrid. It is the principal church of the Reformed Episcopal Church of Spain which is a member of the Anglican Communion.

== History and location ==
The church is at Calle de la Beneficencia, 18 in the Justicia neighborhood, belonging to the Centro district of the capital.

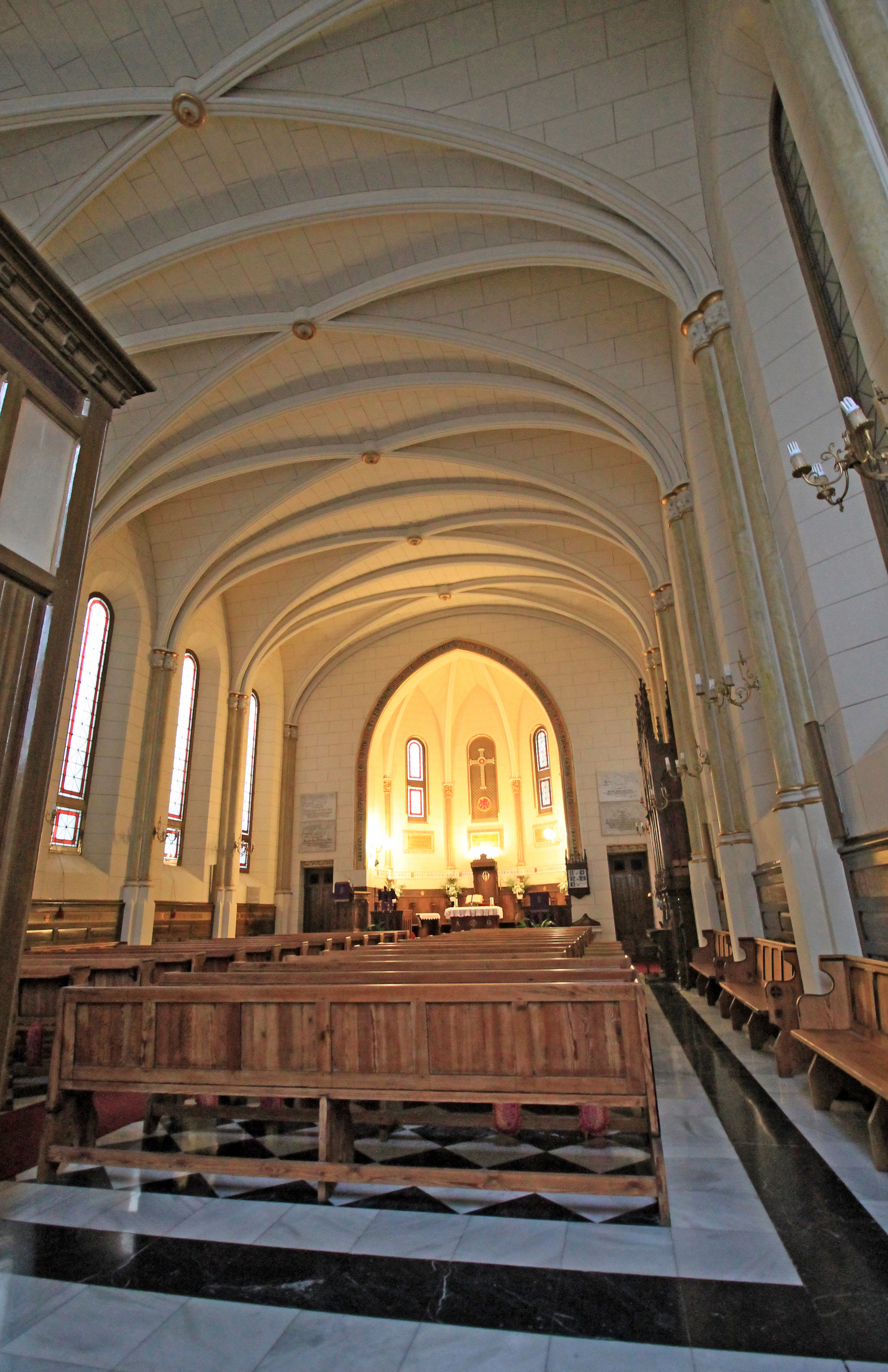
Interior of the cathedral from the rear entry.

However, the congregation of Redeemer is older than the building at Beneficencia. The congregation was founded in 1869 and originally met at Plaza de Santa Catalina de los Donados. Services started at the present location on 27 September 1891. The founding pastor of the congregation was Antonio Carrasco (d. 1873). The congregation was one of the founding churches of the Reformed Episcopal Church of Spain at the founding synod that Church on 2 March 1880. Built in the neogothic style, it was designed by Enrique Repullés Zegarra. The ground was broken for the construction of the church building on 19 March 1891 at the present location at Calle de la Beneficencia at what was formerly the barracks of Saint Matthew. The opening of the church was planned for 1892, but had to be delayed until 1893.

It was during the sixth synod of the Reformed Episcopal Church of Spain, which took place from 21 to 25 September 1894, that the cathedral building was consecrated. It was also during this synod that Juan Bautista Cabrera, the Church's first bishop, was ordained bishop by three bishops of the Church of Ireland. The church was not allowed to open its principal doors for worship until 1905; during that time worshipers had to enter through a smaller side door.

The organ of the cathedral was built by Juan Francisco Sanchez. It was a gift from Queen Victoria Eugenie of Battenberg.

On 28 May 1967 Ramón Taibo, formerly pastor of Redeemer, was consecrated as the third bishop of the Reformed Episcopal Church of Spain. On 31 October 1981 Arturo Sanchez Galan was consecrated bishop of the Reformed Episcopal Church of Spain at the cathedral, and there were some eight bishops in attendance.

It is the oldest functioning Protestant church in Spain. Since 1995 its chief pastor is Bishop Carlos López Lozano.

According to the cathedral website, "The cathedral structure is one of three building structures, the central one is the cathedral itself, appropriately decorated. To its right is the old cathedral school which was closed by the Franco regime in 1939. The left wing is the old residence where the bishop once resided and now administrative church offices are found."

== See also ==
- Anglicanism in Spain
- St George's Anglican Church, Madrid
