= St George's Anglican Church, Madrid =

- Capilla Británica
- Iglesia Anglicana de San Jorge
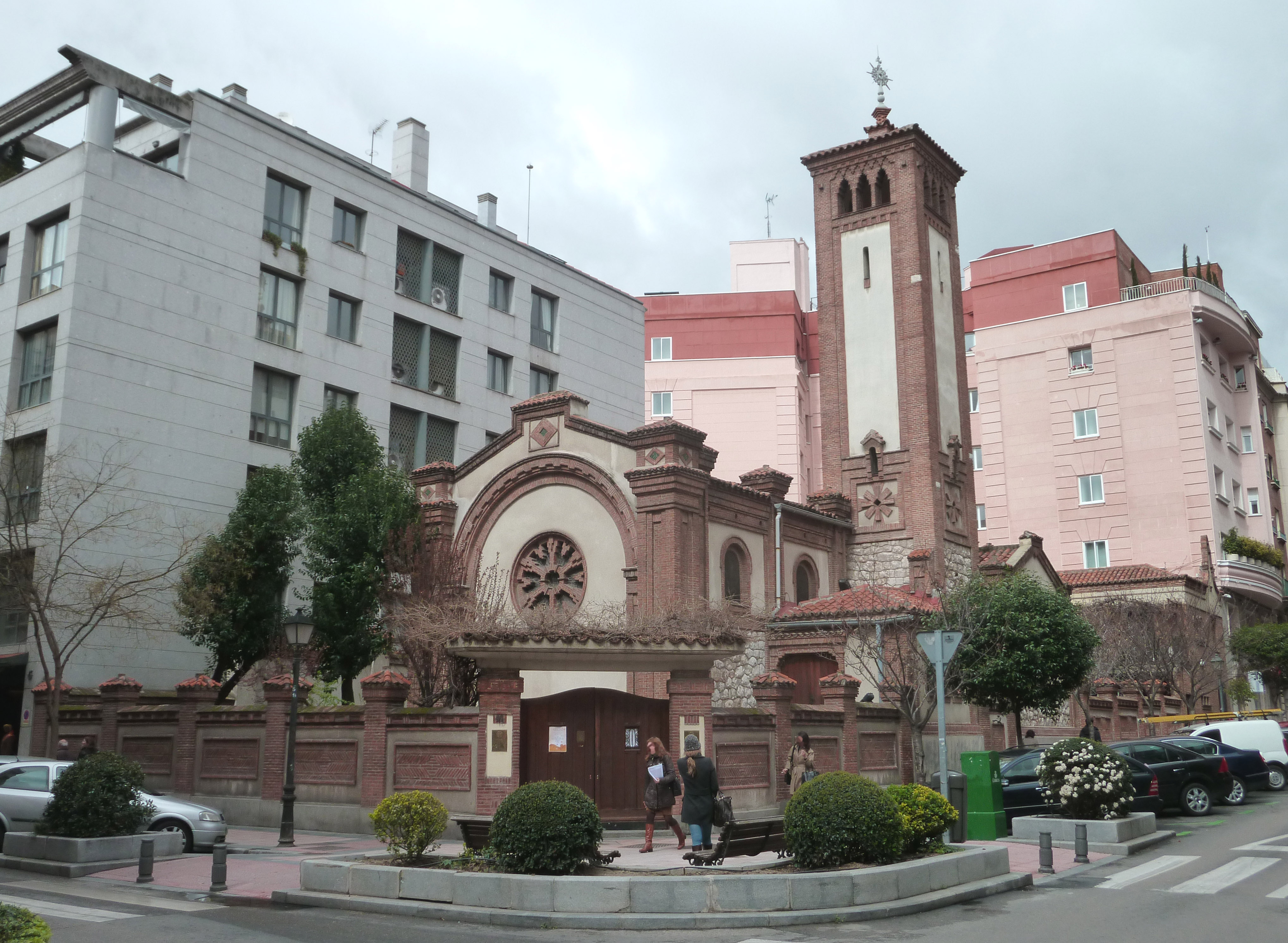
- St George's Anglican Church, Madrid
- 40°25′35.39″N 3°40′58.27″W
- Location: Madrid
- Address: Calle de Núñez de Balboa, 43
- Country: Spain
- Denomination: Church of England
- Website: www.stgeorgesmadrid.org

History
- Status: Church
- Dedication: Saint George
- Consecrated: 1925

Architecture
- Functional status: Active
- Architect: Teodoro de Anasagasti
- Style: Romanesque Revival with neo-Mudéjar elements
- Years built: 1923
- Groundbreaking: 1923

Administration
- Province: Canterbury
- Diocese: Europe
- Archdeaconry: Gibraltar

St George's Anglican Church (Spanish: Iglesia Anglicana de San Jorge), also known as Iglesia Anglicana-Episcopaliana de San Jorge or, simply Capilla Británica ('British Chapel'), is a small Anglican church located in the barrio of Recoletos, district of Salamanca, Madrid, Spain, which belongs to the Diocese in Europe of the Church of England. The church was built in 1923 and was consecrated in March 1925.

== History ==
The beginning of the church goes back to 1864, when the Anglican chaplain Reverend William Campbell was appointed to the British Embassy in Madrid, and held services in a small room in a private house. A few years later, larger premises were provided by the British and Foreign Bible Society. After the coach house of the old British Embassy being converted into a church in 1900, the funds raised through the bequest of Edgar Allen and contributions from the English-speaking community, the groundbreaking for the present church took place in 1923. It was designed by the Spanish architect Teodoro de Anasagasti, who combined Spanish Romanesque and Mudéjar styles with specifically Anglican forms. The church was consecrated in 1925. Since then, it has grown into an English speaking international community with a congregation of some 26 nationalities.

== Architecture ==
The church is situated in a rectangular solar and separated from the street by a small garden. Its designer, the Spanish architect Teodoro de Anasagasti, who blended elements of the traditional Spanish architecture, such as Spanish Romanesque and Mudéjar styles, with specifically Anglican forms, such as the porch or the chancel with its dossal.

The church is a single nave temple, parallel to the north–south direction, the transept, and a polygonal section forming the chancel, where the elevated altar is located. On the left a sacristy is located, a Mudéjar-style tower is erected beside the sacristy. The stained-glass windows in the chancel depict Saint George, patron of England, Saint James the Great, patron of Spain, Saint John, Saint Peter and Saint Paul. Those in the nave represent Saint David of Wales, Saint Andrew, patron of Scotland, Saint Patrick, patron of Ireland and Saint Francis of Assisi. In the north choir there are windows portraying Saint Cecilia and Saint Anthony Abbot, and in the porch, the Nativity of Christ.

== Gallery ==
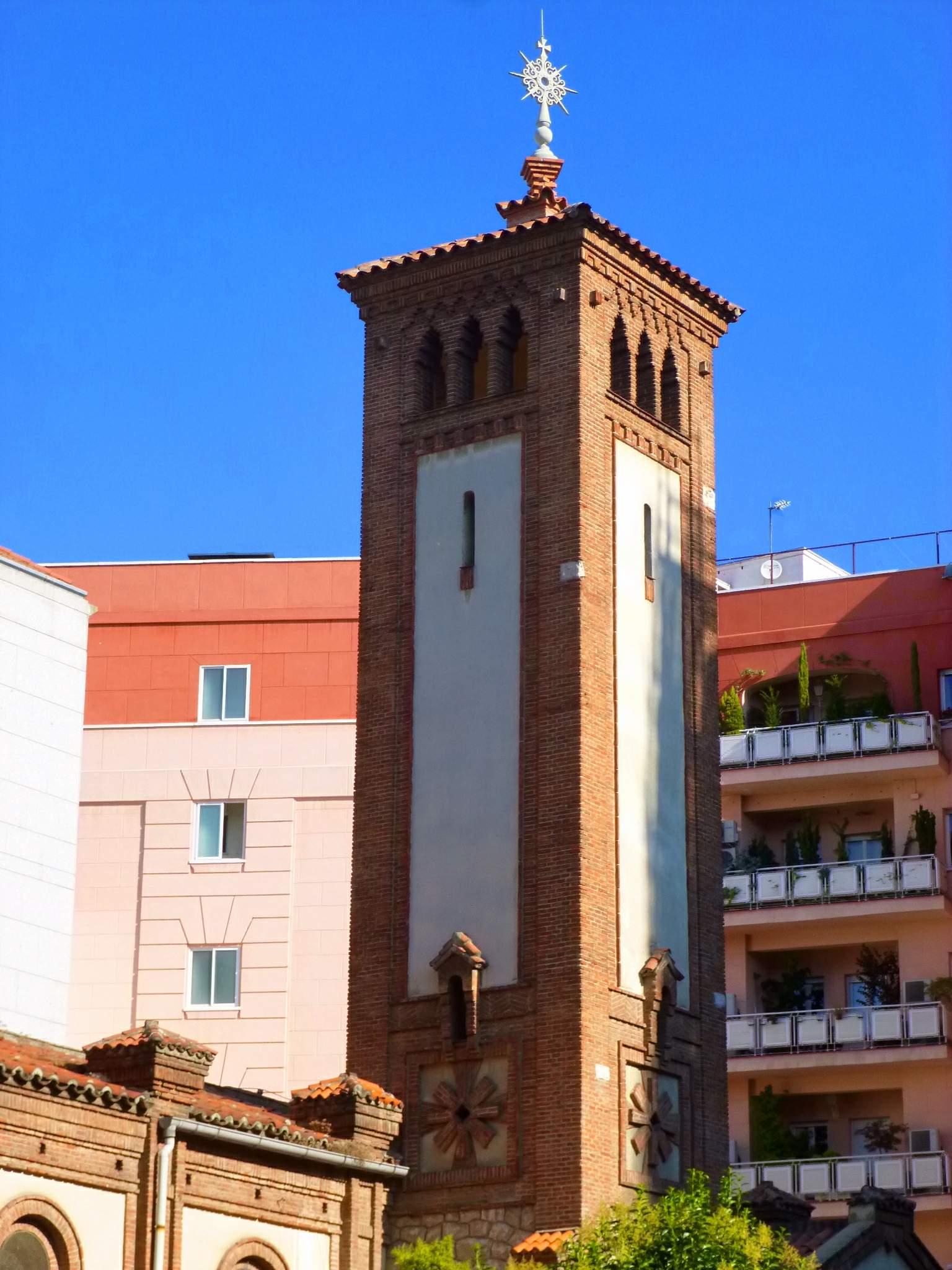
The Mudéjar-Romanesque tower

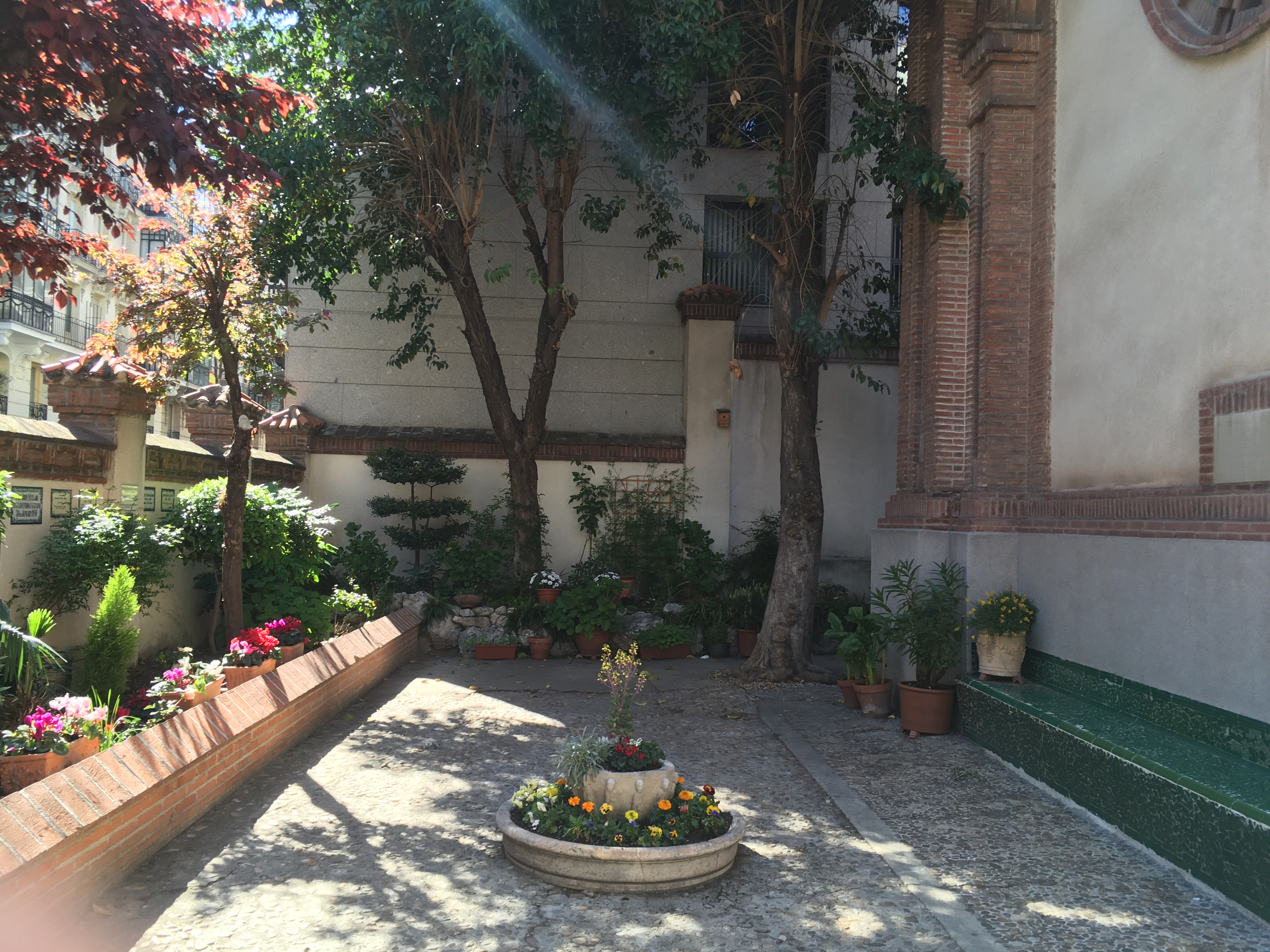
The church courtyard

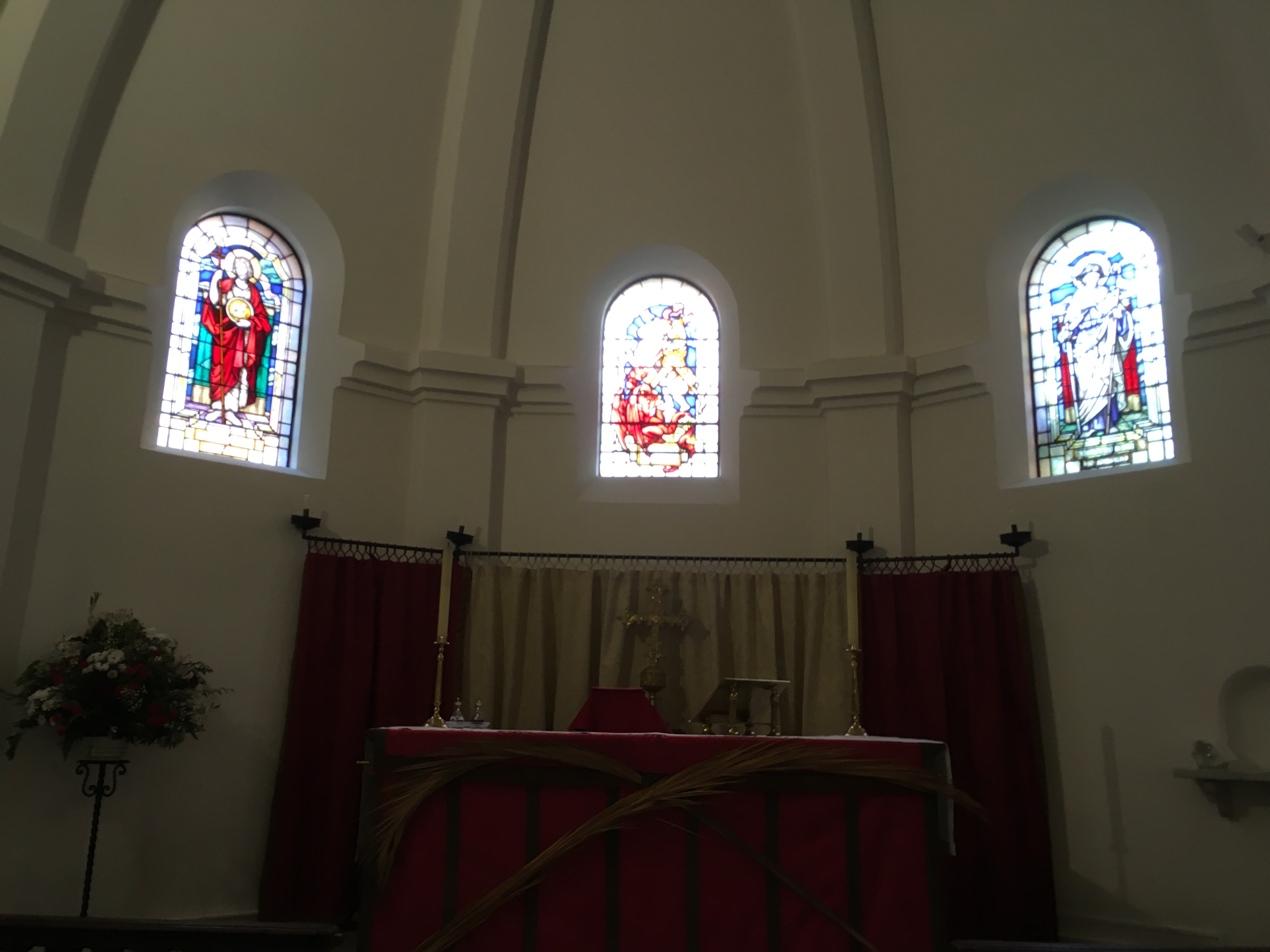
The chancel

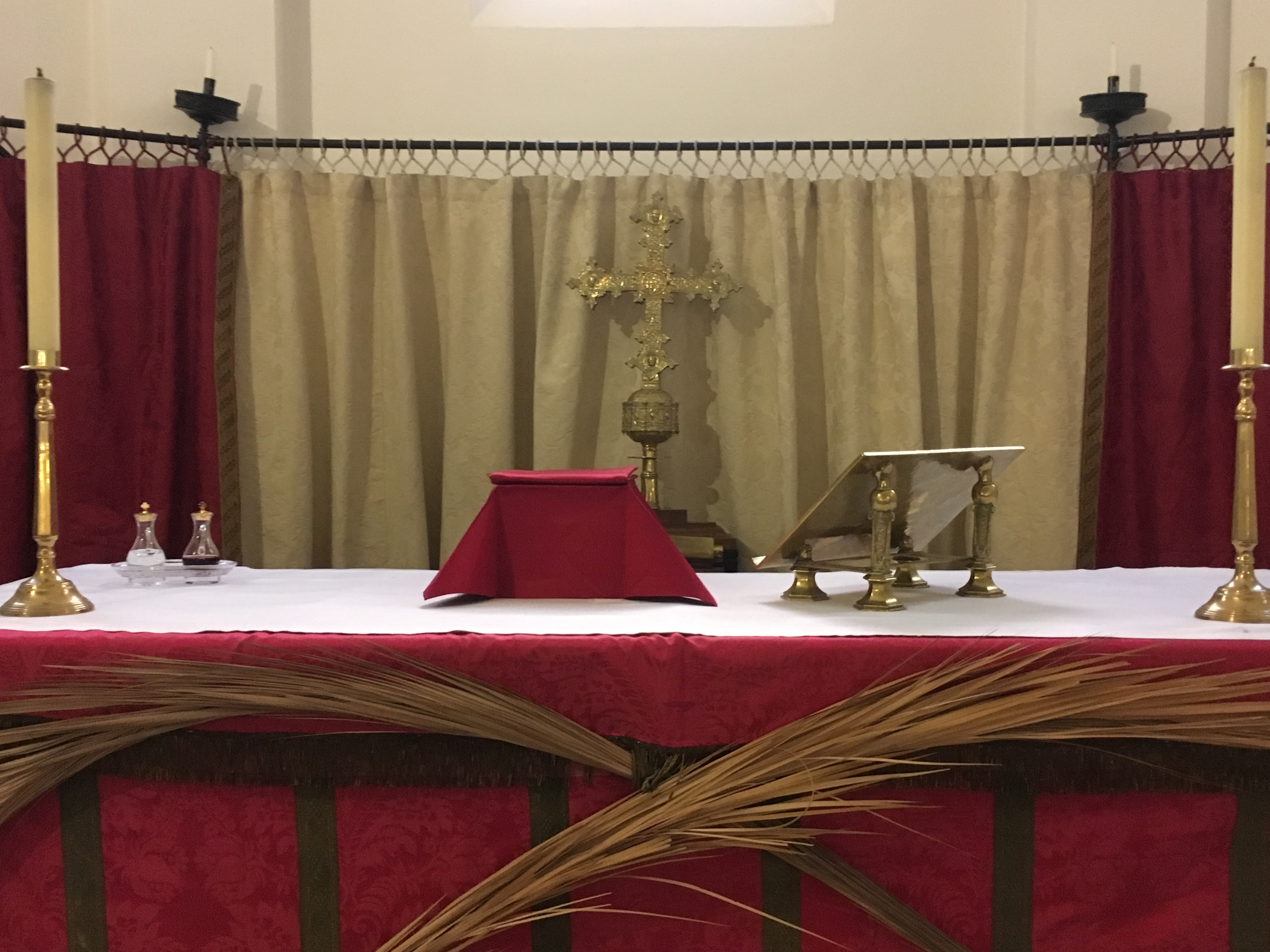
The altar

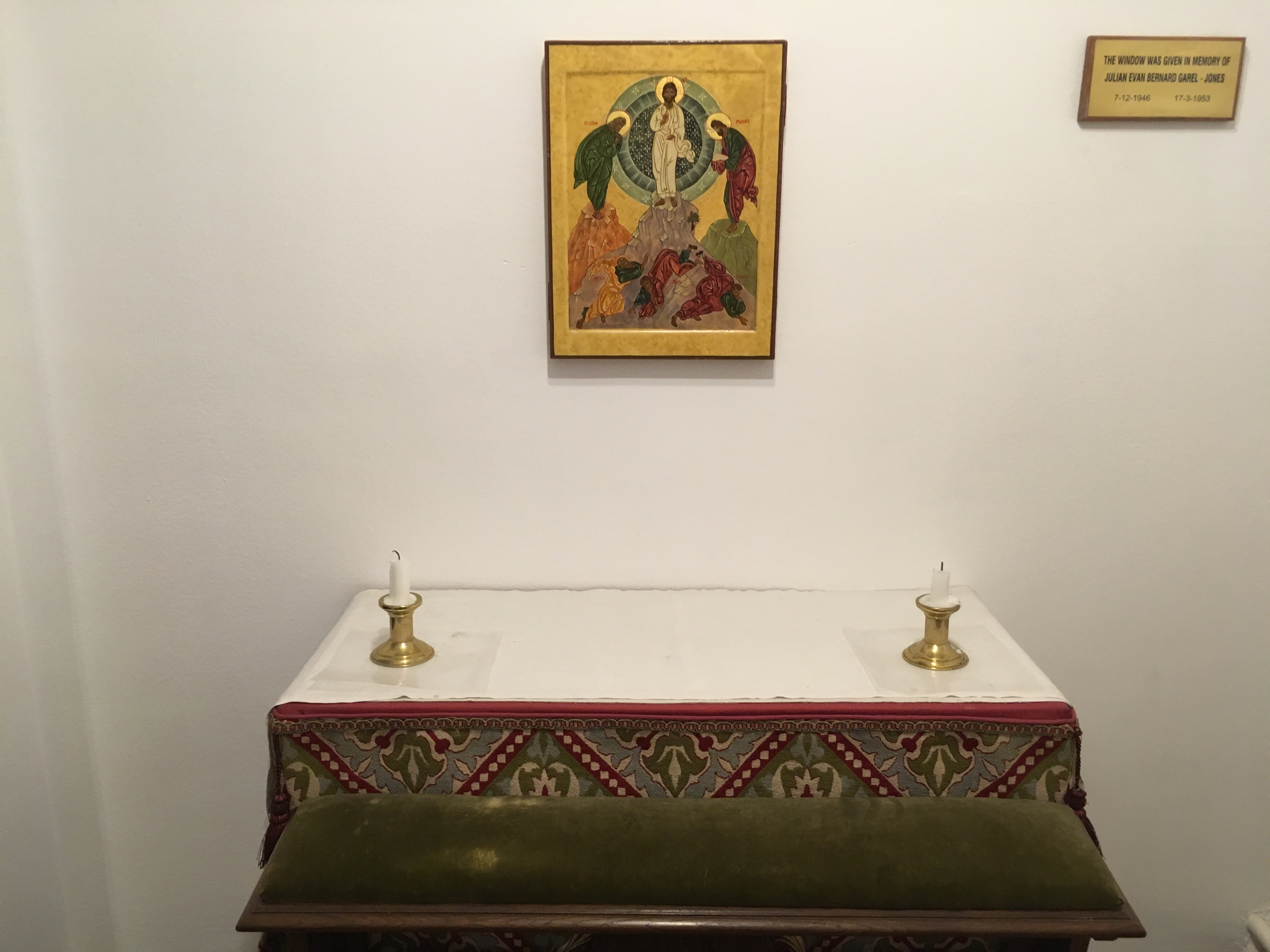
Icon of the Transfiguration

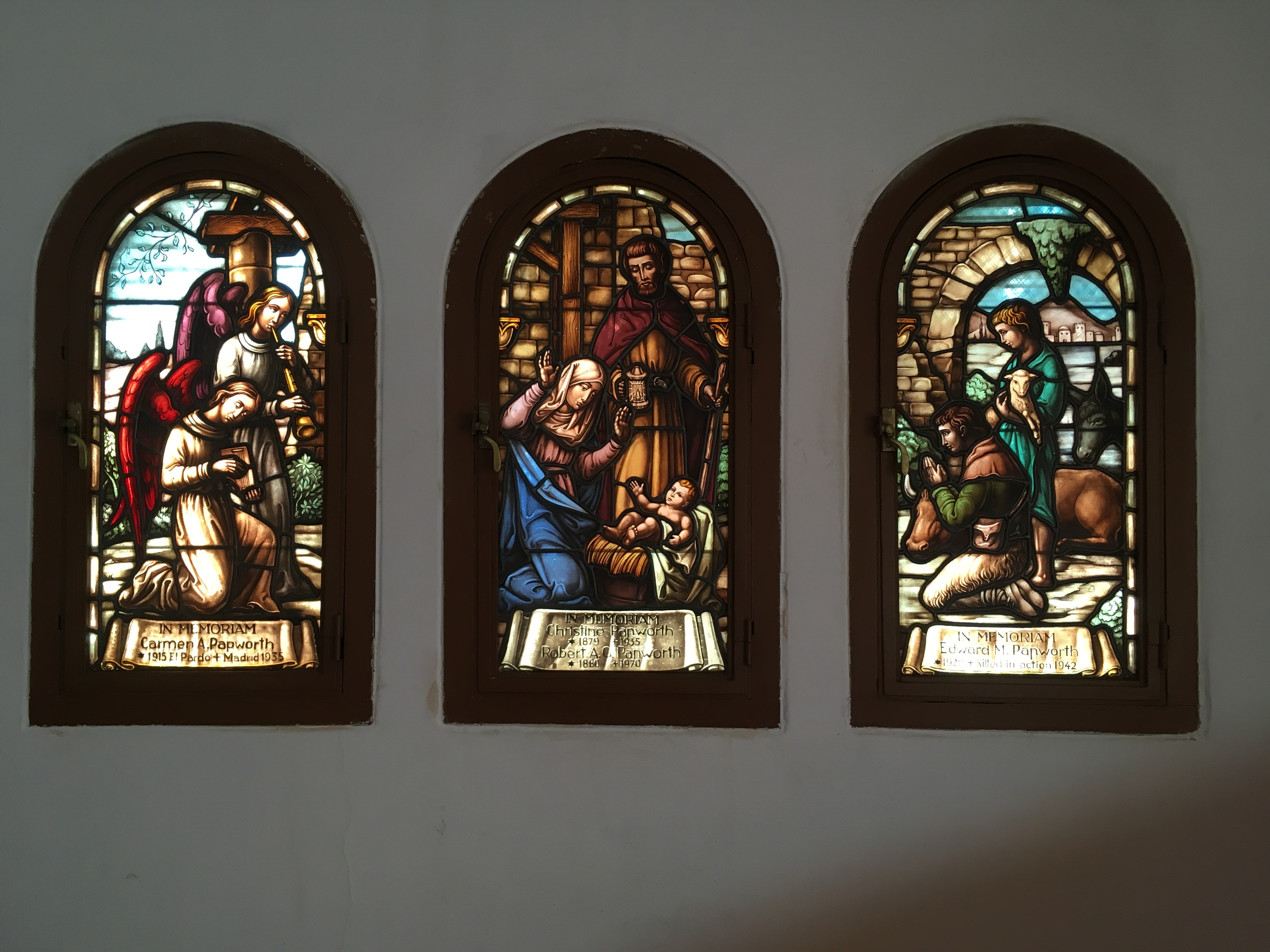
Stained-glass windows depicting the Nativity

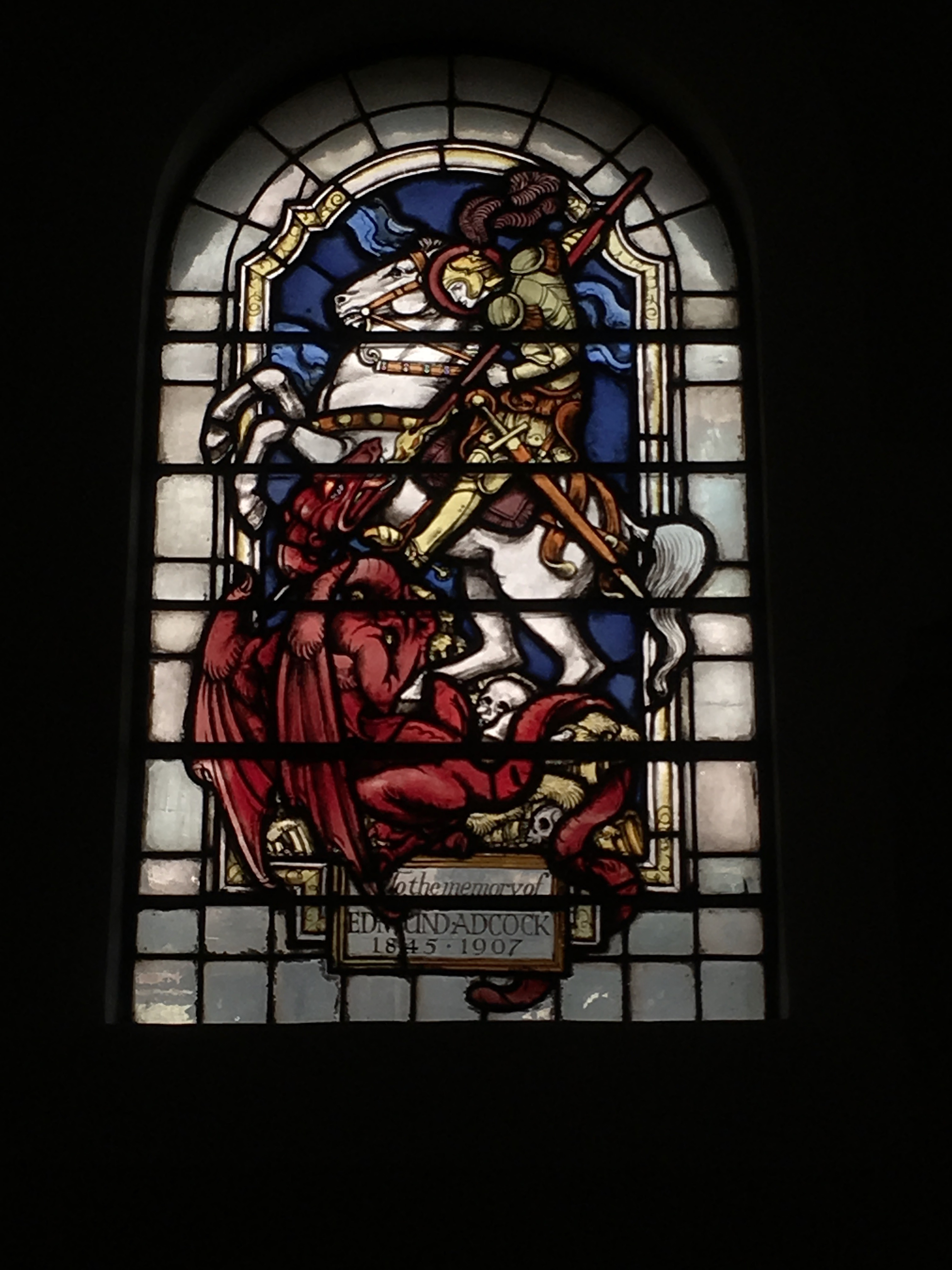
Stained-glass window depicting St George

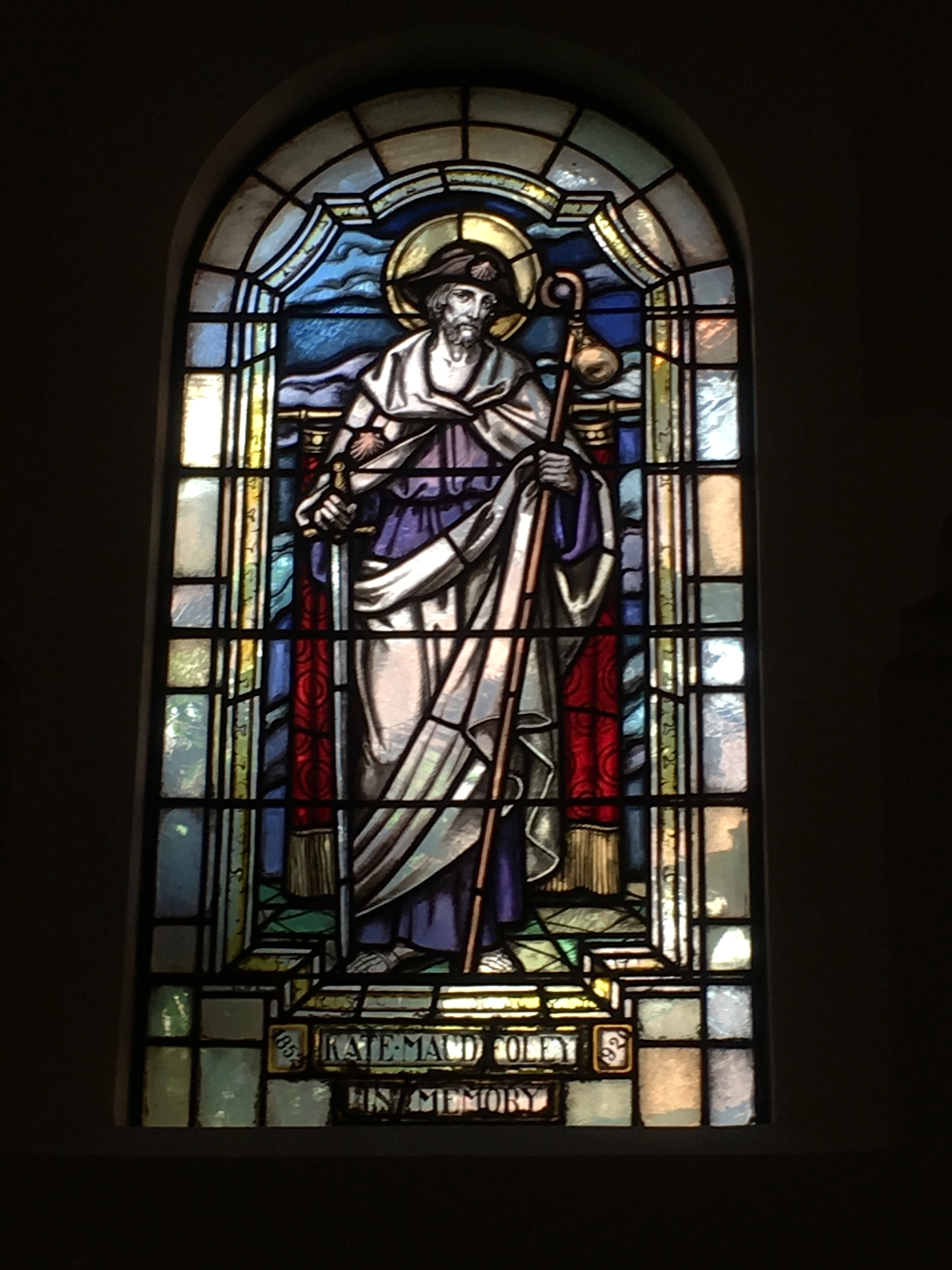
Stained-glass window depicting St James the Great

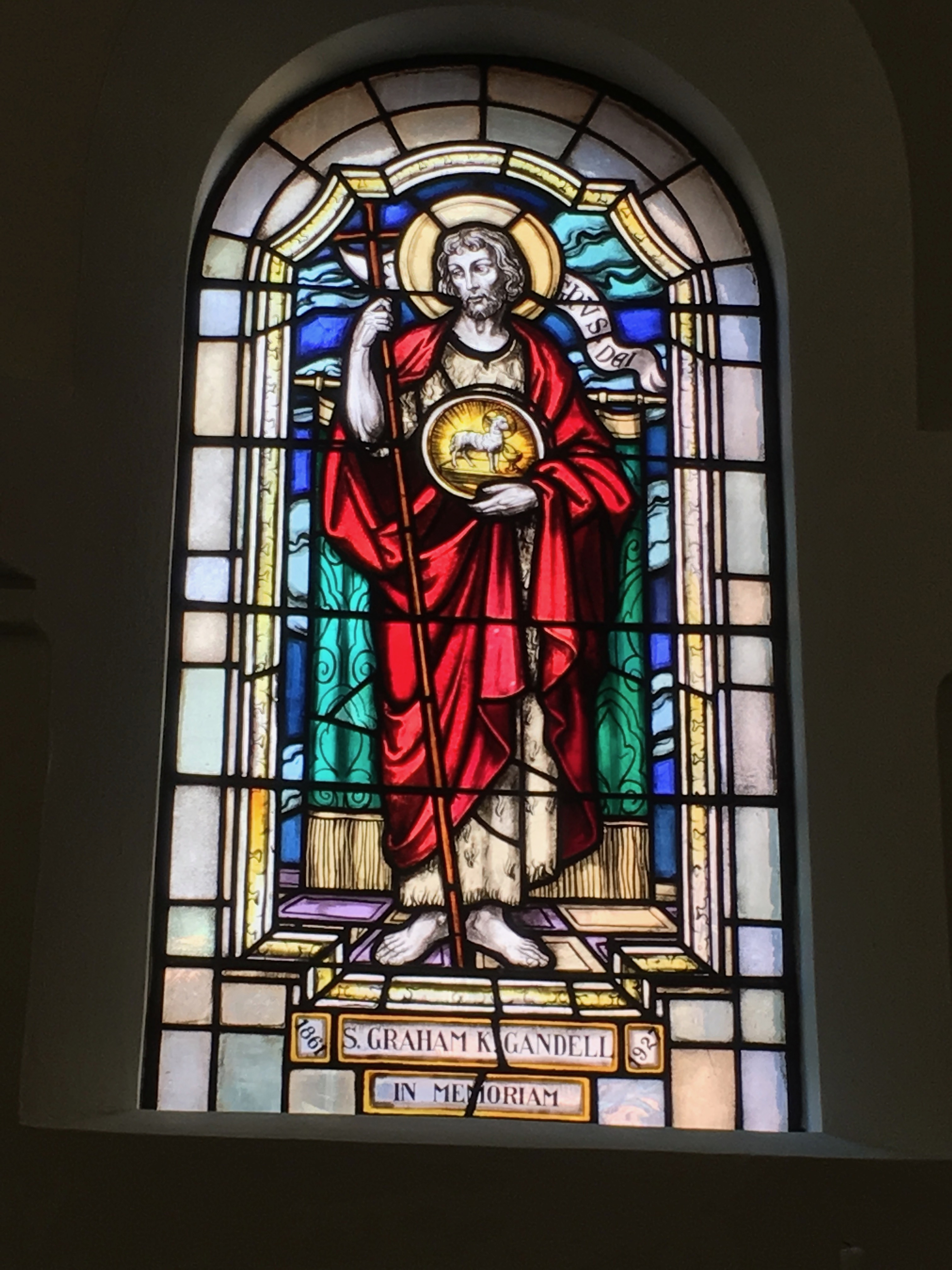
Stained-glass window depicting St John the Baptist

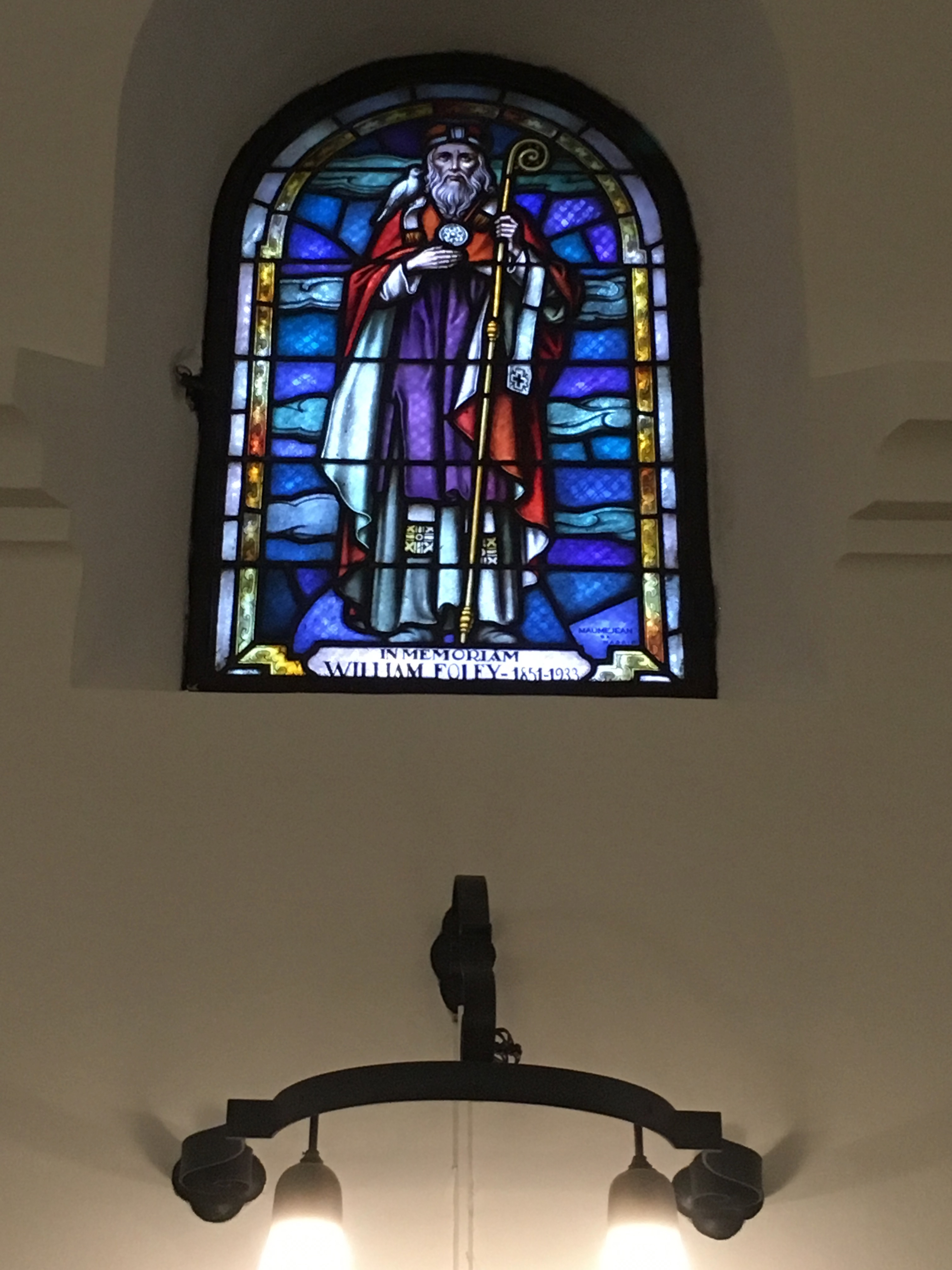
Stained-glass window depicting St David of Wales

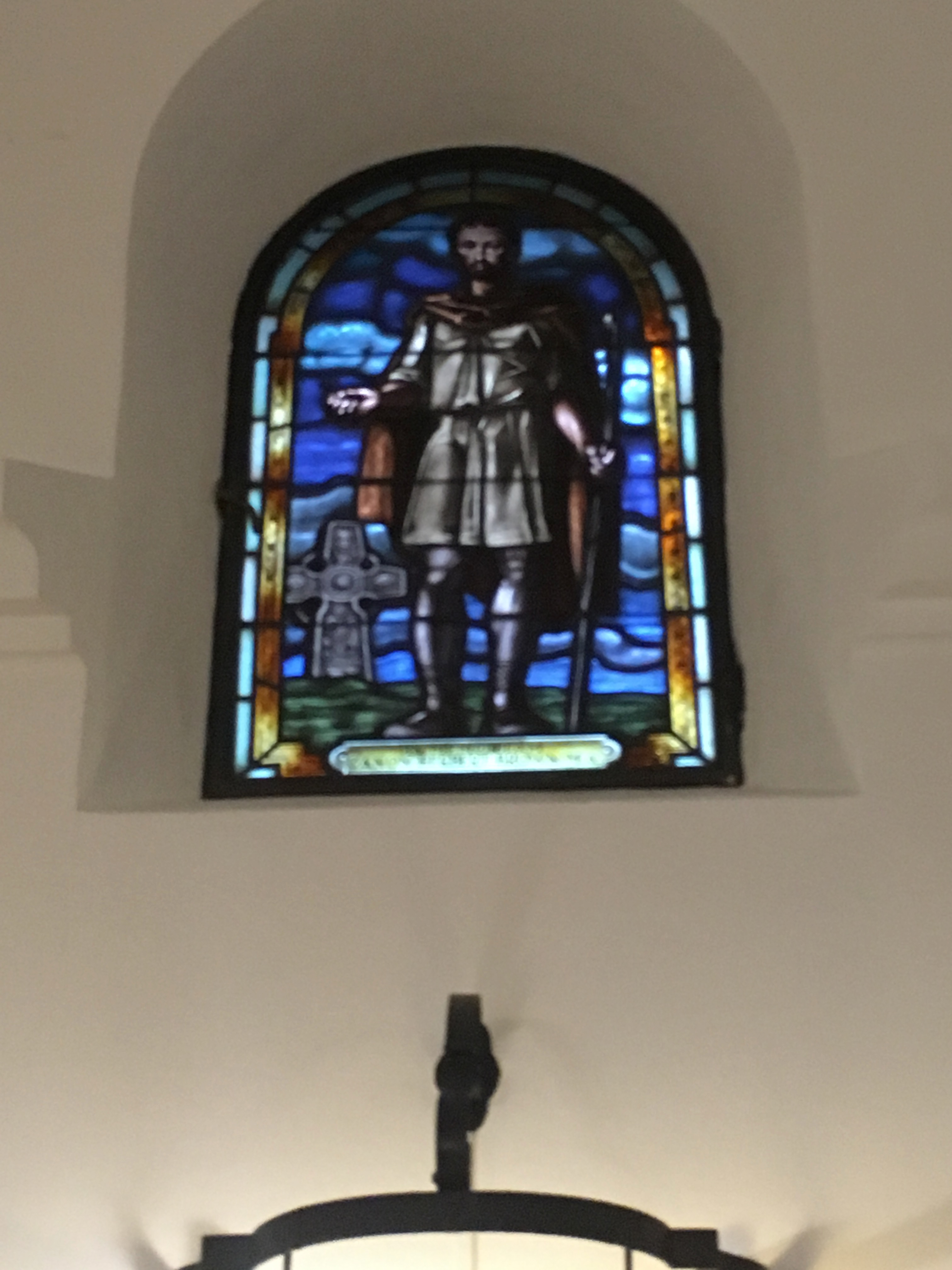
Stained-glass window depicting St Patrick

== See also ==
- Anglicanism in Spain
- Anglican Cathedral of the Redeemer
- Spanish Reformed Episcopal Church
