= Frederick Meyrick =

British clergyman (1827–1906)

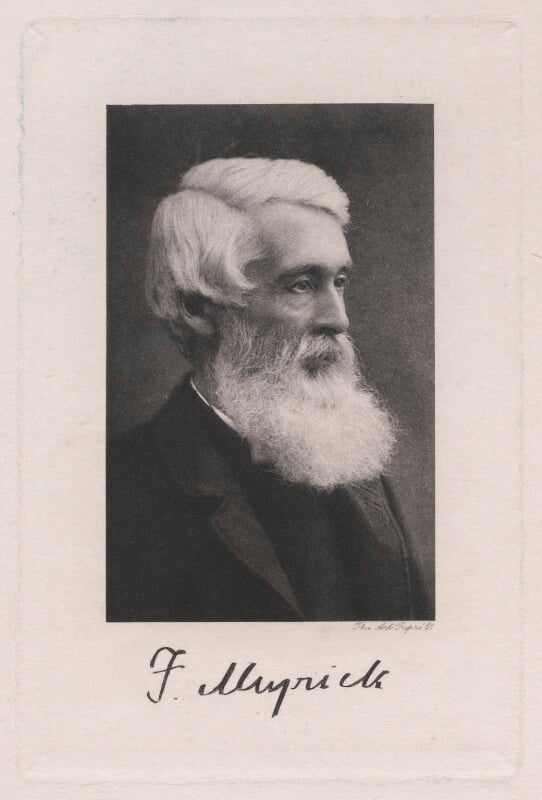
Meyrick in the early 1900s

Canon Frederick Meyrick (28 January 1827 – 3 January 1906) was a Church of England clergyman and author who served as Secretary of the Anglo-Continental Church Society for more than forty years.

== Early life ==
Born at Ramsbury, Wiltshire, Meyrick was the youngest son of Edward Graves Meyrick, vicar of Ramsbury, by his marriage to Myra Howard. He claimed descent from the family of Meyrick of Bodorgan, Anglesey, through Rowland Meyrick, a 16th-century bishop of Bangor. Educated at Ramsbury school, he won a scholarship to Trinity College, Oxford, where he matriculated on in June 1843 and graduated BA, with a second class degree in the classical school, in 1847. He was President of the Oxford Union in the Hilary term of 1849 and proceeded to MA by seniority in 1850.

== Career ==
Meyrick was elected a fellow of his college in 1847 and travelled on the Continent with pupils. Returning to Oxford, he was ordained as a deacon in 1850 and as a priest in 1852. He became a tutor of Trinity College and crossed swords with Henry Edward Manning over Roman Catholic ethics. In 1853, the Anglo-Continental Church Society was created, and for forty-six years Meyrick was its secretary. He was a select preacher at Oxford in 1855–1856 and a Whitehall preacher in the following year. In 1859 he was appointed as an inspector of schools and in 1860 gave up his fellowship.

In 1868, Meyrick was given a benefice in Norfolk, as Rector of Blickling with Erpingham, where he spent the rest of his life. Also in 1868 he was appointed as examining chaplain to Christopher Wordsworth, bishop of Lincoln (a position he held until 1885) and from 1869 was a non-residentiary canon of Lincoln Cathedral.

Prompted by the First Vatican Council of 1869–1870, Meyrick visited Ignaz von Döllinger at the time of his excommunication, and he also attended and helped to organise the Bonn conferences on reunion in 1874 and 1875. In 1886 he was briefly the principal of Codrington College, Barbados. In 1892 he travelled with Lord Plunket, Archbishop of Dublin, to Spain in support of the Protestant Reformed Church there. In 1894, Plunket consecrated Juan Bautista Cabrera, the Bishop-elect of the Spanish Reformed Church, as a bishop, and Meyrick drew up a public address in support of him. In 1898 he resigned as Secretary of the Anglo-Continental Church Society and in 1899 retired as editor of the Foreign Church Chronicle,' which he had edited for twenty years. In 1904 he took part in the controversy on ritual in the church, taking the side of the moderate evangelicals.

Meyrick travelled widely, was fluent in many languages, and was looked on as clever in disputes. He was thought to have failed to gain promotion in the Church of England due to being controversially zealous.

== Private life ==
In 1859 Meyrick married Marion E. Danvers, and they had two sons and five daughters.

He died at Blickling on 3 January 1906, and a window in the parish church commemorates him.

== Selected publications ==
- The Practical Working of the Church of Spain (1851)
- Moral Theology of the Church of Rome (1856)
- The Outcast and the Poor of London (1858)
- University and Whitehall Sermons (1859)
- Is Dogma a Necessity? (1883)
- The Doctrine of the Church of England on the Holy Communion restated (1885)
- The Church in Spain (1892)
- Scriptural and Catholic Truth and Worship (1901)
- Memories of Life at Oxford, &c. (1905)

Meyrick also translated standard works of the English divines into Latin and other languages, wrote anti-Roman Catholic pamphlets, and contributed to Smith's Dictionary of the Bible (1860, 1863), A Dictionary of Ecclesiastical Antiquities (1875), A Protestant Dictionary (1904) and One Volume Commentary (1905).
