= List of ambassadors of the Kingdom of England to Russia =

Ambassador of the Kingdom of England to Russia
- Arms of England
- Style: His Excellency
- Appointer: The monarch
- Inaugural holder: Anthony Jenkinson; First Ambassador/Envoy to Russia Charles Howard, 1st Earl of Carlisle; First Ambassador extraordinary to Russia
- Formation: 1566; Ambassadors and other envoys 1663; Ambassadors Extraordinary

The ambassador of the Kingdom of England to Russia was the Kingdom of England's foremost diplomatic representative in Russia, otherwise known as Muscovy, heading the English diplomatic mission.

== List of heads of mission ==
=== Ambassadors and other envoys ===
- 1566-1567: Anthony Jenkinson Agent
- 1568-1569; Thomas Randolph Special Ambassador
- 1571-1572: Anthony Jenkinson Special Ambassador
- 1575-1577: Daniel Silvester Special Ambassador
- 1583-1584: Sir Jerome Bowes Special Ambassador
- 1586-1587: Jerome Horsey Agent
- 1588-1589: Dr Giles Fletcher Special Ambassador
- 1590-1591: Jerome Horsey Special Ambassador
- 1598-1599: Sir Francis Cherry Special Ambassador
- 1599-1600: Thomas Willis Special Ambassador (but expelled from Russia)
- 1600-1601: Sir Richard Lee Special Ambassador
- 1601-1602: John Merrick Special Ambassador
- 1604-1605: Sir Thomas Smythe Special Ambassador
- 1613: John Merrick and William Russell Special Ambassadors
- 1613-1634 : Thomas Finch
- 1614-1617: Sir John Merrick Ambassador Extraordinary
- 1618: Sir Dudley Digges Special Ambassador
- 1620-1621: Sir John Merrick Special Ambassador
- 1623-1624: Christopher Cocks Agent
- 1626-1632: Fabian Smith Agent
- 1633: Thomas Wyche Agent
- 1633-1635: Richard Swift Agent
- 1635-1640: Simon Digby Agent
- 1655-1656: William Prideaux Special Ambassador
- 1657: Richard Bradshaw Special Ambassador

=== Ambassadors Extraordinary ===
- 1663-1665: Charles Howard, 1st Earl of Carlisle
- 1667-1668: Sir John Hebdon
- 1669: Sir Peter Wyche Envoy Extraordinary
- 1676-1678: John Hebdon
- 1686-1687: Patrick Gordon
- 1699-1712 : Charles Goodfellow Minister and Consul-General
- 1704-1707: Charles Whitworth, Envoy of England and later of Great Britain, 1704-1709; later Ambassador extraordinary of Great Britain, 1709-1711 and Ambassador extraordinary and plenipotentiary of Great Britain, 1711-1712.

== After the Union of England and Scotland ==
In 1707 the Kingdom of England became part of the new Kingdom of Great Britain. For missions from the court of St James's after 1707, see List of ambassadors of Great Britain to Russia.
