= Sir William Meyrick =

English civil lawyer and judge

- Died: 3 February 1667–8
- Occupations: Civil lawyer and judge

Sir William Meyrick, or Mericke, (died 3 February 1667–8) was an English civil lawyer and judge.

== Biography ==
Meyrick was the son of Maurice Meyrick of Bodeon, Anglesey, by Jane, daughter of Lewis Evans, was admitted scholar of Winchester College in 1608, scholar of New College, Oxford, on 16 July 1614, and fellow on 16 July 1616; he graduated B.C.L. on 18 April 1621, D.C.L. on 30 June 1627. He resigned his fellowship in 1626, and was admitted a member of the College of Advocates on 2 February 1627–8, and practised before the court of high commission. On 28 September 1641 he succeeded Sir Henry Martin as judge of the prerogative court of Canterbury. In 1643 he joined the king at Oxford, whence on 8 May he issued a notice revoking the powers of his deputies at Canterbury. Sir Nathaniel Brent was appointed to succeed him on 10 January 1647–8. At the Restoration Meyrick was reinstated in the prerogative court, and on 8 November 1661 was knighted at Whitehall. He died on 3 February 1667–8, and was succeeded by Sir Leoline Jenkins.
