= Carlos López Lozano =

Spanish Anglican bishop (born 1962)

- Bishop of the Spanish Reformed Episcopal Church
- Province: extra-provincial
- Diocese: Spanish Reformed Episcopal Church
- In office: 1995–present
- Predecessor: Arturo Sánchez Galán
- Other posts: Honorary assistant bishop, CofE Diocese in Europe (2013–present)

Orders
- Consecration: 1995 by George Carey

Personal details
- Born: 25 May 1962 (age 64) Madrid, Community of Madrid, Spain
- Denomination: Spanish Reformed Episcopal

Carlos López Lozano (born 25 May 1962) is a Spanish Anglican bishop. He has been the diocesan Bishop of the Spanish Reformed Episcopal Church (IERE), based in Madrid, since 1995.

Born in Madrid, López studied historiography at the Autonomous University of Madrid and theology at the United Evangelical Theological Seminary, Madrid. He was serving as Rector of Christ the Redeemer, Salamanca (since 1990) when, on 29 July 1995, at the forty-third Synod of IERE, he was elected to serve as IERE's next diocesan bishop. He was duly consecrated by George Carey, Archbishop of Canterbury, on 5 November (the IERE is "extra-provincial to", i.e. under the direct metropolitical care of, the Archbishop of Canterbury).

As a bishop of a European diocese in full communion with the Church of England, López has also been an honorary assistant bishop of the Church of England Diocese in Europe since 2013.

The bishop's residence and the diocesan offices and archives are located on the grounds of the Anglican Cathedral of the Redeemer in Madrid.

== See also ==
- Anglicanism in Spain
