= John Merrick =

John Merrick may refer to:

- John Merrick (MP) (1584–1670), English politician elected Member of Parliament for Newcastle-under-Lyme in the Short Parliament
- John Merrick (ambassador) (fl. c. 1596–1621), English ambassador to Russia
- John Merrick (architect) (1756–1829), best known for Province House in Nova Scotia, Canada
- John Merrick (insurance) (1859–1919), African-American founder of North Carolina Mutual & Provident Insurance Company in Durham, North Carolina
- John Merrick (golfer) (born 1982), American golfer
- John Merrick (Buffyverse character)
- Joseph Merrick (1862–1890), the Elephant Man; early biographies inaccurately give his first name as "John", and this name was used in the 1980 film The Elephant Man

== See also ==
- John Merricks (1971–1997), British sailor
