= Richard T. Merrick =

American politician

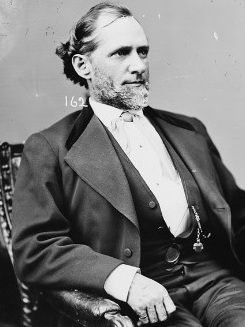
Richard T. Merrick, Chicago and Washington, DC lawyer.

Richard Thomas Merrick (January 28, 1828 – June 23, 1885) was a lawyer and Democratic political figure.

Born in Charles County, Maryland, Merrick was the son of William D. Merrick, a member of the Maryland legislature and the United States Senate. His brother, William Matthews Merrick, was a federal judge and congressman from Maryland. His uncle, William Matthews, was the President of Georgetown College. At the age of eighteen, Merrick raised a company of dragoons for service in the Mexican–American War, becoming part of the 3rd U.S. Dragoons. On his return from Mexico, he began to practice law and was elected to the Maryland Legislature. He later moved to Chicago and represented Illinois at the 1860 Democratic National Convention as a delegate for Stephen Douglas.

In 1864, he married Nannie McGuire and moved to Washington, D.C., where he became a successful attorney. He defended John Surratt against allegations that he was involved in Abraham Lincoln's assassination, and later represented Samuel J. Tilden at the Electoral Commission of 1877. In 1874, he endowed the Merrick Medal, a prize given annually to the best debater of the Philodemic Society of Georgetown University. He assisted in the prosecution of the star route scandal from 1882 to 1883.

Among those he served as counsel to was Lorenzo Thomas.

On April 16, 1868, Merrick testified in the impeachment trial of President Andrew Johnson, having been called as a witness by Johnson's defense team.

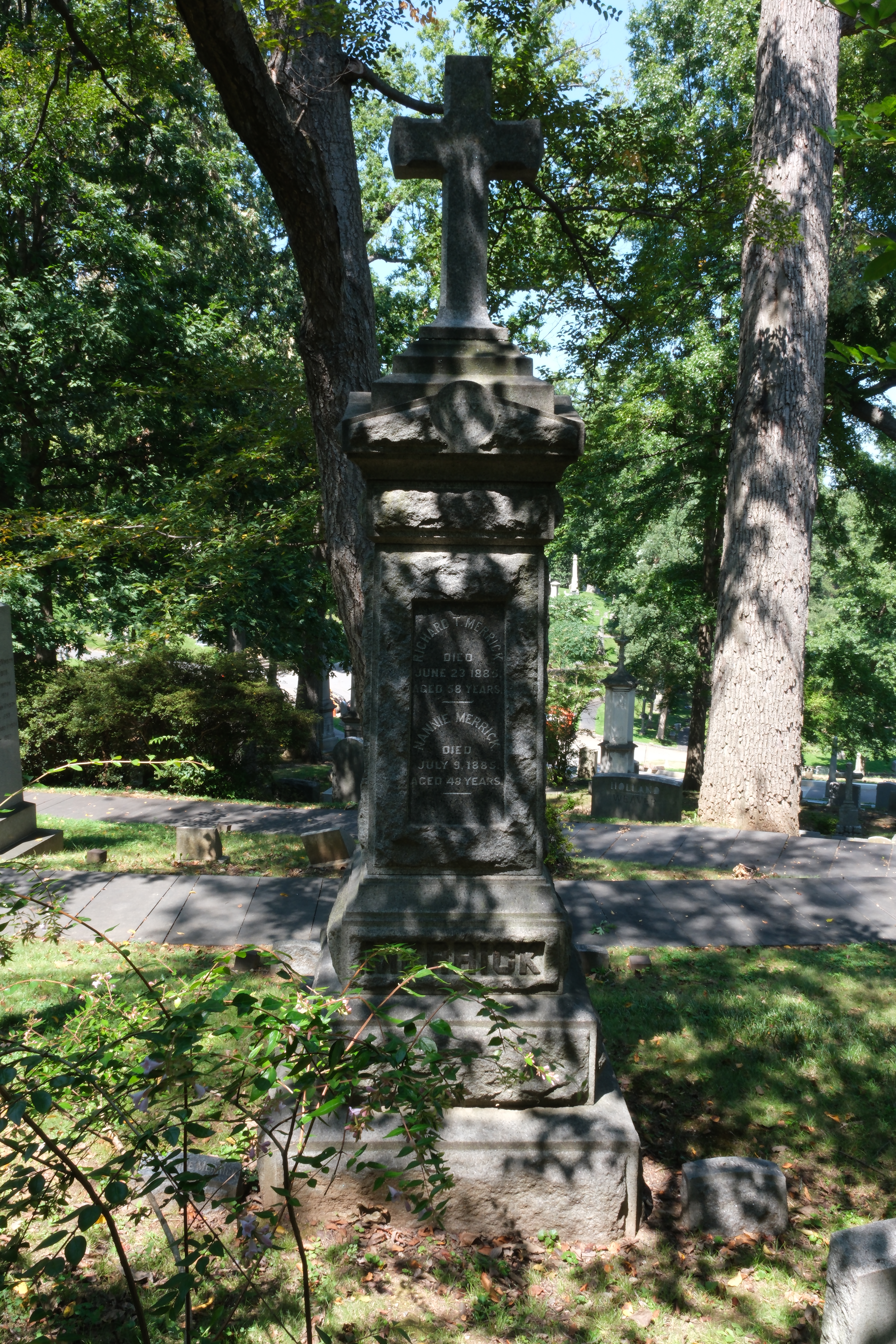
Grave of Merrick at Oak Hill Cemetery

Merrick died on June 23, 1885, and was buried at Oak Hill Cemetery in Georgetown, Washington, D.C. His daughter, Mary Virginia Merrick, was the founder of the National Christ Child Society and is a candidate for canonization.

== Sources ==
- "After a Long Illness: The Death of the Hon. Richard T. Merrick" (PDF). The New York Times. June 24, 1885.
