= Merrick (given name) =

Merrick is a masculine given name which may refer to:

- Merrick Baker-Bates (1939–2023), British diplomat
- Merrick Bremner (born 1986), South African professional golfer
- M. E. Carn (1808–1862), 48th lieutenant governor of South Carolina
- Merrick Cockell (born 1957), British politician
- Merrick Fry (born 1950), Australian artist
- Merrick Garland (born 1952), American judge and United States Attorney General
- Merrick Hanna (born 2005), American dancer
- Merrick James-Lewis (born 1992), English footballer
- Merrick McCartha, American actor
- Merrick Thomson (born 1983), Canadian former professional lacrosse player
- Merrick Watts (born 1973), Australian comedian, radio host and television presenter, of the comedy duo Merrick and Rosso
- Merrick Wing (1833-1895), American politician
