= Linda Merrick =

British clarinettist (b.1963)

Linda Joyce Merrick CBE (born 11 May 1963) is a British clarinettist and the current principal of the Royal Northern College of Music.

Merrick was born in Bristol. Her Ph.D. thesis was published by VDM Verlag in 2009.

Merrick joined the Royal Northern College of Music (RNCM) as director of performance studies and senior tutor in clarinet in 2001. She became director of the RNCM's Centre for Excellence in Teaching and Learning (2005–2010), vice-principal (2006–2012) and principal (from 2013). Under Merrick’s leadership, the RNCM was rated the top UK conservatoire for research in the Research Excellence Framework (2014).

As a clarinet soloist, Merrick has released over 40 solo CDs for labels including NMC, Naxos, Guild and Metier, and broadcast for BBC Radio 3, Arte TV, CKWR Radio in Canada and DRS 1 Radio in Switzerland. She has performed as a soloist internationally in America, Australia, China, the UAE and throughout Europe.

Merrick has performed over 80 new commissions and recorded three CDs with the contemporary ensemble Sounds Positive of which she is a founding member. She is also a regular collaborator with the Kreutzer Quartet.

Merrick is a Fellow of the Royal Academy of Music, Royal College of Music and the Royal Northern College of Music, where she holds a Personal Chair. She is Chair of Conservatoires UK, Vice-President of the Clarinet and Saxophone Society of Great Britain and the UK Representative for Howarth Clarinets.

She was appointed Commander of the Order of the British Empire (CBE) in the 2023 New Year Honours for services to music in higher education.
