= Mary Virginia Merrick =

American philanthropist (1866–1955)

Servant of God Mary Virginia Merrick
- Mary Virginia Merrick with two children (c. 1953)
- Born: 2 November 1866; Washington D.C., U.S.
- Died: 10 January 1955 (aged 88); Washington, D.C., U.S.
- Resting place: Oak Hill Cemetery; Washington, D.C., U.S.

Mary Virginia Merrick (November 2, 1866 – January 10, 1955), born in Washington, DC, was a pioneer in American Catholic social reform. At age 20, despite being paralyzed from a fall, she started the Christ Child Society in 1887 to provide for needy infants, children, and their families in the Washington, D.C. area. During her lifetime, she grew the National Christ Child Society to 38 chapters, and today it operates 45 chapters in 21 states and in DC with nearly 6,000 members.

Merrick's cause for beatification was opened in 2001 in the Roman Catholic Archdiocese of Washington; Merrick was designated a Servant of God in 2003.

== Early life ==
Mary Virginia Merrick was born to prominent parents Richard and Nannie Merrick. Richard Merrick was a well-known lawyer, a founder of Georgetown University Law Center, and a descendant of former Maryland Governor Leonard Calvert. His uncle was William Matthews, President of Georgetown College. Nannie Merrick's family was well known for its success in business and its work in establishing Washington, D.C.'s first art collection, the Corcoran Gallery of Art.

Merrick grew up in a devoutly-Catholic environment fostered by her parents and was educated by French nurses and tutors who stressed the Catholic tradition and piety. She developed a deep faith and a love for helping others early while visiting and assisting local poor and vulnerable families with her mother. She aspired to become a Sister of Charity after a religious conversion experience soon after her eleventh birthday.

In her early teen years, Merrick had a fall from a playhouse, beginning the deterioration of her health. She was later diagnosed with a musculoskeletal form of tuberculosis. She eventually spent the majority of her time in a bed, and used a reclining wheelchair.

== Formation of the Christ Child Society ==
As a teenager, Merrick began to sew clothing for needy children from her reclining position, eventually organizing a small sewing circle to complete a layette in honor of the "Christ Child" to be given to a poor infant during the Christmas season. The following year, she encouraged a child of one of her family's employees who told her he was unlikely to receive a Christmas gift to write letters to the Christ Child to request one. After that, children began sending letters to the Christ Child requesting Christmas gifts, and she and her friends would fill the requests, noting them "from the Christ Child". After her parents died suddenly when Merrick was 18, she conceived the idea of the Christ Child Society, envisioning an organization to serve needy children and families in the community inspired by seeing the Christ Child in every child.

The original Society of 1887 consisted of Merrick's family members and friends, growing to become fully active in distributing layettes and garments and answering Christmas letter requests in 1890. In 1891, Merrick hosted 41 needy children in the D.C. countryside for two weeks; this was the Society's Fresh Air program's beginning. A Council was formed in 1894 to consist of the supervisors of different Society committees, and a Board of Managers was established around 1900. Merrick believed firmly in lay service in the Church, and she founded the Christ Child Society based on that belief.

== Expansion of the Christ Child Society ==
In 1900, Merrick opened the first official Christ Child House in Washington, D.C., featuring a library and offering music classes for children, nurse-taught courses on the care and treatment of children for underprivileged mothers, and many other courses. The Christ Child Society was formally incorporated in 1903, marked with a published mission of providing improved instruction and relief for needy children in Washington, then a segregated city, "regardless of race, creed, or color".

Merrick oversaw the opening of several more Christ Child Centers in Washington so that by 1907, eight Centers served over two thousand children in the area. By 1908, Merrick's Society had expanded to seven other cities: Baltimore, New York City, Omaha, Worcester, Chicago, Toledo, Dayton, and Ellicott City. Merrick would correspond with the leaders through letters and representatives.

In 1912, Pope Pius X acknowledged and commended the Christ Child Society in a letter to Merrick. In the decade to follow, the Society would purchase a permanent Fresh Air Farm in Silver Spring, Maryland, which later led to several summer camps. The Society also established a Committee on Dental Work to provide free dental care for children in the District's public schools, with significant funding from the U.S. Congress, as well as a program providing D.C. children with medical aid, braces, and orthopedic supplies. The Society later turned over its significant children's clothing distribution duties to the then-forming Catholic Charities organization in Washington, D.C.

Merrick focused the society's early work on programs in the city's poor neighborhoods, through service to minority and immigrant families, offering English language and other skills classes and religious instruction. In 1913, Merrick created a "Colored Auxiliary Committee" within the society. Some historians have criticized Merrick for allowing such racial segregation. In contrast, others have praised her for giving black members a representative on the society's board and autonomy in making decisions about internal operations when African-American rights were severely limited in many other aspects of life.

Even as the Society's work grew in scope, professionalism, and geographic footprint, Merrick emphasized the Society's devotion to the Incarnation as the guiding force behind its ambitions as well as its members' service to children.

== Late life ==
In 1948, health concerns forced Merrick to resign from her position heading the National Society. However, she was still elected Honorary National President of the Society and served in that position until she died in 1955. She continued to serve as President of the Washington Chapter until her death.

In her later years, Merrick composed a draft of a handwritten autobiography that recounted the formation and growth of the Society. She spent the last 30 years of her life in Chevy Chase, Maryland, where she was cared for by her sister and three secretaries, and she continued to work on behalf of the Society. Near the end of her life, in 1954, Merrick said of her life's work: "The guiding principle of the Society has always been personal service rendered for the love of the Christ Child to the least of these little ones. In developing this purpose, the Society has widened and deepened its activities to meet the exigencies of its time".

On January 5, 1955, Merrick was taken to Georgetown Hospital after complaining of pain and died there of a cerebral hemorrhage on January 10, 1955, at 88. Upon her death, the Archbishop of Washington, Cardinal Patrick O’Boyle, predicted she would be the first U.S.-born saint in the Catholic Church.

Merrick is buried at Oak Hill Cemetery in Georgetown.

== Other accomplishments/awards ==
- 1915: Merrick was awarded the Laetare Medal from University of Notre Dame.
- 1932: Merrick was the first woman to receive the Cosmopolitan Club Medal, awarded every year to Washington, D.C.'s most outstanding citizen.[1]
- 1937: at the Christ Child Society's fiftieth anniversary, the Vatican honored Merrick with the Pro Ecclesia et Pontifice Medal, given to recognize those who work exemplarily for the Catholic Church.
- 1938: Eleanor Roosevelt wrote about Merrick and the Christ Child Society's work in her Washington Daily News column. In her column, Roosevelt wrote: "[Merrick] began by making one child happy at Christmas time, and now, in this city, there is a settlement house which takes care of thousands of children. There is a convalescent home where 32 children are taken the year-round and restored to health. The work of the Society has become national".
- 1938: Merrick received the Siena Medal of the Theta Phi Alpha Women's fraternity, given every year to a Catholic woman who has made a distinctive contribution to United States Catholic life.
- 1948: Merrick was given an honorary degree from Georgetown University.

== Works ==
- In 1909, The Life of Christ, a children-oriented book meant to combine the lessons of Catholicism with the teachings of the Gospels, was published.
- In 1913, Margery Stories, a collection of fictional tales with moral messages for young adults.
- In 1915, Come Unto Me, a set of prayers before and after Communion.
- In 1920, The Altar of God, another child-focused work meant to introduce youth to the Catholic Mass

== Beatification cause ==
In April 2011, Donald Cardinal Wuerl, a former Archbishop of Washington, officially opened the Archdiocesan process through a decree that stated he was "initiating the cause of beatification and canonization of the Servant of God, Mary Virginia Merrick". This stage is still currently in process, supervised by Kathleen Asdorian, JD; JCL, as a postulator.

== Legacy ==
As of 2024, there are 45 chapters in 22 states with over 5,000 members of the National Christ Child Society serving children and families in need today, still governed by Merrick's motto that "Nothing is ever too much to do for a child," and as dictated by local conditions. In addition to providing new mothers with essential items such as bottles, diapers, clothing, blankets, and books for newborns, the Society engages in wide variety of programs and services, including reading and literacy programs; book distributions; parenting programs; in-school and after-school education and enrichment programs; dedicated facilities for children who have been ejected from the foster system; school supplies, clothing, shoes, and outerwear for school-aged children; backpacks full of personal items for children in foster care or fleeing domestic violence; and thousands of Christmas and Easter gifts each year to needy children and families.

In 2007, the Mary Virginia Merrick Center, an Out-of-School safe place that operates as a community and youth recreational facility for children and families opened in Washington D.C.

== Sources ==
- Rissetto, Harry. In Service of the Christ Child: An Illustrated Biography of Mary Virginia Merrick, 1866–1955. National Christ Child Society. 2003.
- "Saintly woman, not yet a saint," Chicago Tribune. Glen Elsasser. September 28, 2007.
- 1954 National Christ Child Society Annual Report
