= Maurice Meyricke =

Maurice Meyricke (ca. 1563 – 1640) was a Welsh academic at the University of Oxford in the sixteenth and seventeenth centuries.

== Life ==
Meyricke, from Anglesey, matriculated from New College, Oxford on 11 May 1582 with a scholarship at the age of 19. He obtained his BA degree on 27 October 1585 and his MA degree on 2 June 1589. He also became a Fellow of New College at about this time.

His brother William and half-brother John Meyrick were also educated at New College, Oxford. Maurice was the Registrar of the University of Oxford from 1600 to 1608. He was appointed as a Fellow of Jesus College, Oxford in the royal charter of 1622 issued by James I.

His son was Sir William Meyrick.

He died in 1640.
