= John Meyrick (bishop) =

- Bishop of Sodor and Man
- Installed: 1576
- Term ended: 1599 (death)
- Predecessor: John Salisbury
- Successor: George Lloyd

Orders
- Consecration: 15 April 1576 by Edmund Grindal

Personal details
- Born: c. 1538
- Died: November 7, 1599 (aged 60–61) Yorkshire
- Education: Winchester College; New College, Oxford

Styles of John Meyrick, M.A.
- Reference style: The Right Reverend
- Spoken style: My Lord
- Religious style: Bishop

John Meyrick (or Merick, Mericke, or Merrick), M.A. (1538– 7 November 1599) was an Anglican clergyman who served in the Church of England as the Bishop of Sodor and Man from 1576 to 1599.

== Early life and education ==
He was the natural son of Owen ab Huw ab Owen ab Meyric of Bodeon, Anglesey, and Gwenllian, daughter of Evan of Penrhyndeudraeth, Merionethshire. He became a pupil at Winchester College in 1550, before continuing with his education at New College, Oxford in July 1555, where he was elected a Fellow on 5 July 1557. He graduated with a Bachelor of Arts on 12 December 1558 and a Master of Arts on 26 June 1562. He served as junior proctor at the college in 1565.

Two of his half-brothers, William and Maurice, were also educated at Winchester College and New College, Oxford.

== Ecclesiastical career ==
He was the vicar of Hornchurch in Essex from 1570 to 1574. In 1575, he was nominated Bishop of Sodor and Man by Henry Stanley, 4th Earl of Derby, and received royal assent on 5 November 1575 and again on 13 April 1576. He was consecrated at Lambeth Palace on 15 April 1576 by Edmund Grindal, Archbishop of Canterbury. During his tenure, Meyrick gave William Camden an account of the Isle of Man, published in Camden's Britannia.

After holding the bishopric for twenty-three years, he died in office in Yorkshire on 7 November 1599, aged 61.

Church of England titles
Preceded by John Salisbury	Bishop of Sodor and Man; 1576–1599	Succeeded by George Lloyd
