= Spanish Reformed Episcopal Church =

Christian denomination in Spain

- Spanish: Iglesia Española Reformada Episcopal
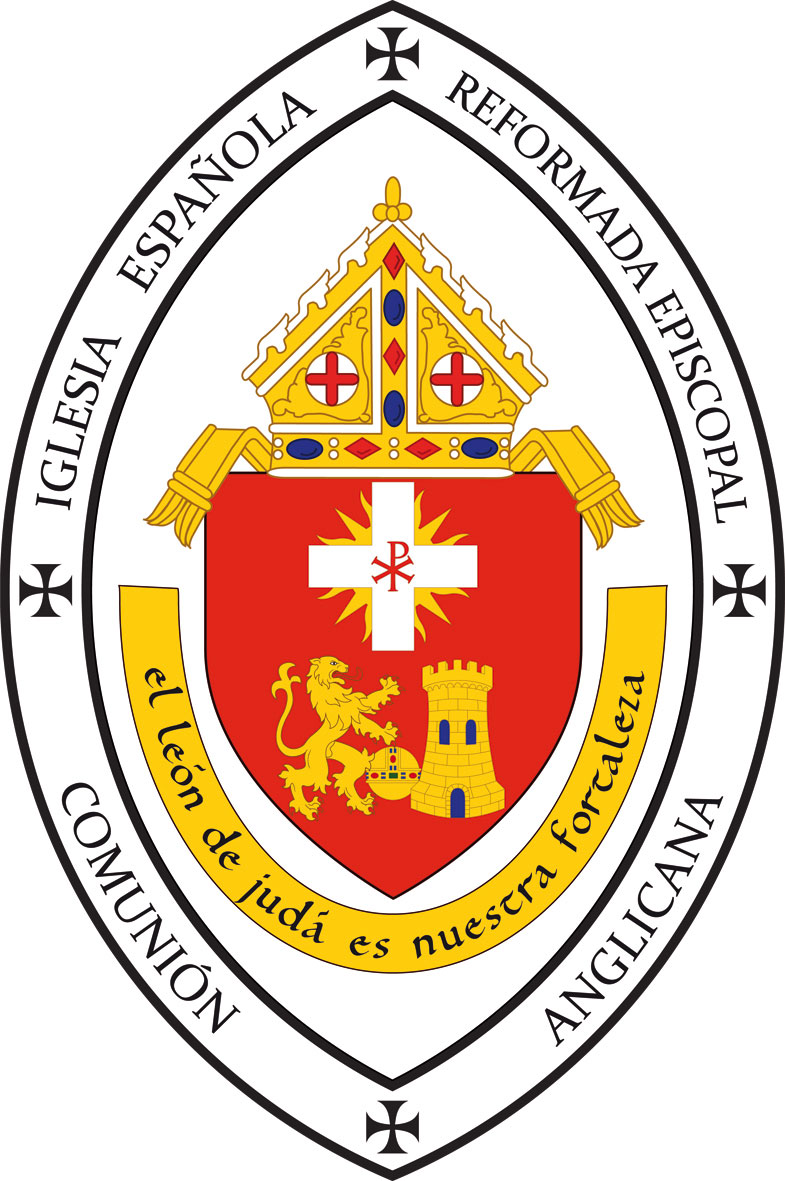
- Seal of Spanish Reformed Episcopal Church
- Abbreviation: SREC
- Classification: Christian
- Orientation: Anglican
- Scripture: Holy Bible
- Theology: Anglican doctrine
- Polity: Episcopal
- Primate: Sarah Mullally
- Bishop: Carlos López Lozano
- Extra-provincial church: Extra-provincial church within the Anglican Communion
- Associations: Anglican Communion; Porvoo Communion
- Region: Spain
- Language: Spanish
- Liturgy: Mozarabic Rite
- Headquarters: Madrid, Spain
- Origin: 1868
- Members: 5,000 - 11,800
- Official website: anglicanos.es

The Spanish Reformed Episcopal Church, also translated as Reformed Episcopal Church of Spain, or IERE (Spanish: Iglesia Española Reformada Episcopal) is the church of the Anglican Communion in Spain. It was founded in 1880 and since 1980 has been an extra-provincial church under the metropolitan authority of the Archbishop of Canterbury. In 2016, a quantitative study of Anglicanism published in the Journal of Anglican Studies, by Cambridge University Press, reported that the church claims 5,000 total members. In 2017, Growth and Decline in the Anglican Communion: 1980 to the Present, published by Routledge, collected research reporting there were 11,800 Episcopalians in Spain. Its cathedral is the Anglican Cathedral of the Redeemer in Madrid.

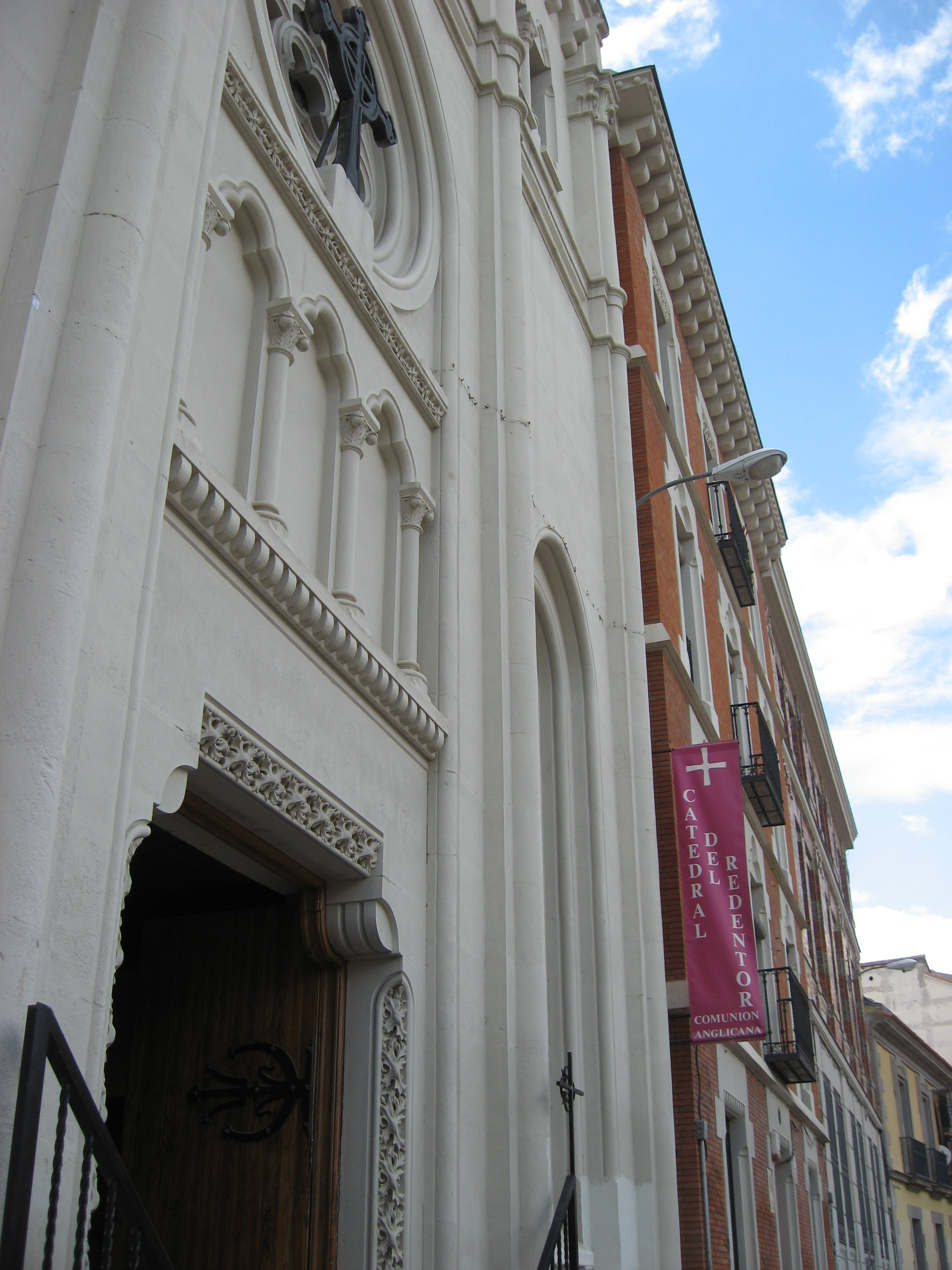
Exterior of the Cathedral of the Redeemer in Madrid, the only cathedral of the Spanish Reformed Episcopal Church

== Doctrine ==
In keeping with the rest of mainstream Anglicanism, the IERE claims itself to be part of the One Holy Catholic and Apostolic Church established by Christ and his apostles. It claims to maintain apostolic succession via the Church of Ireland's bishops and it holds to the threefold ministry of bishops, priests and deacons. It keeps the three creeds of the Primitive Church.

The IERE also claims itself to morally be the continuing church of the ancient pre-Spanish church by maintaining the sacramental system as handed down through the Mozarabic Rite. Due to its Reformed tradition, some would say this is largely a church that places itself within the confines of the Evangelical stream of Anglicanism.

== History ==
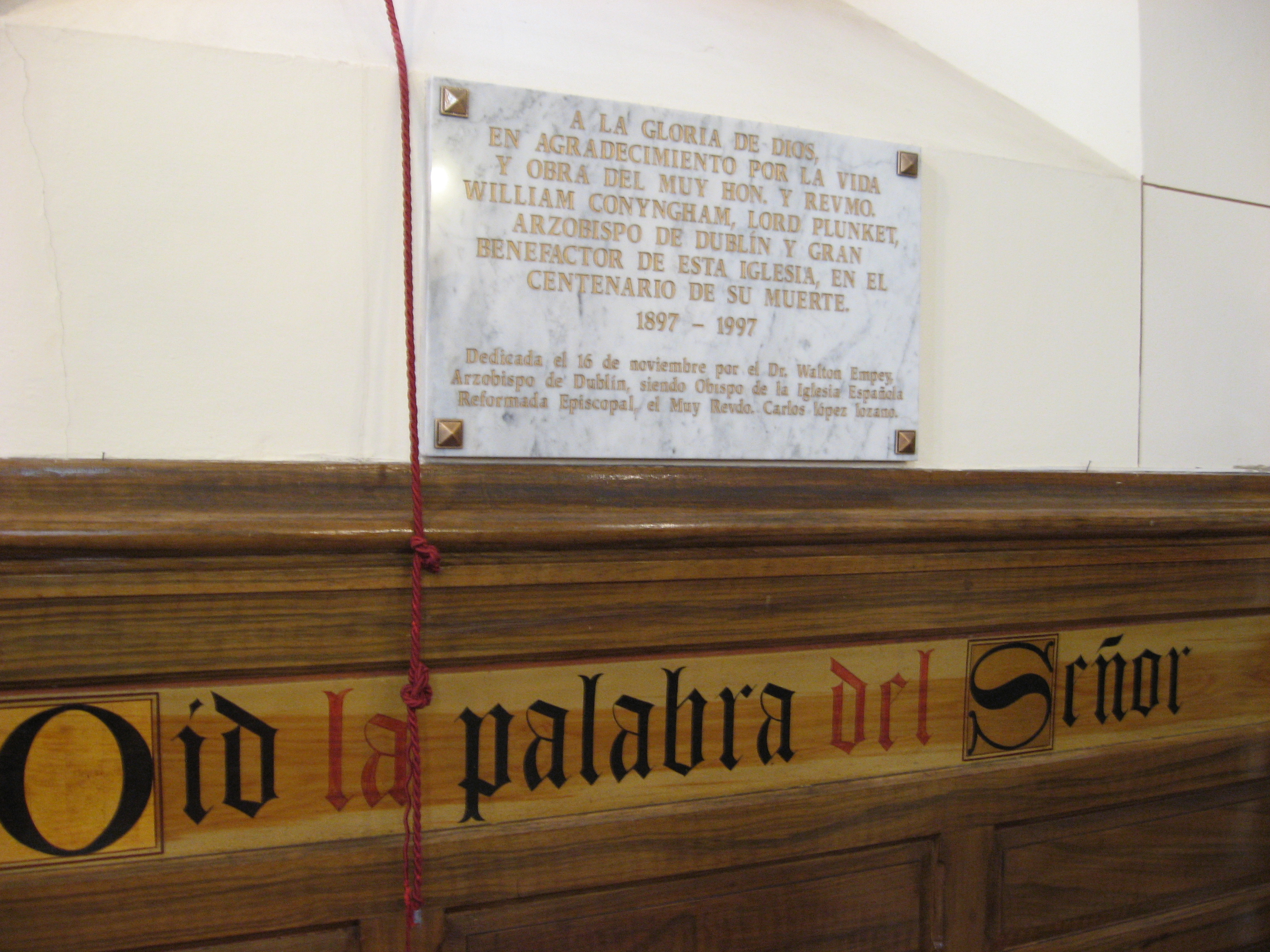
A plaque in the Cathedral of the Redeemer

The Spanish Reformed Episcopal Church was formed "being born of individuals who left the Church of Rome for reasons of Biblical conscience but desired epsicopacy and an ordered vernacular liturgy for which Anglicanism provided the original precedent." The IERE considers its origin to be in 1868 when the "Consistorio General de la Iglesia en España" (General Consistory of the Church in Spain) was formed by Juan Bautista Cabrera in Gibraltar.

The IERE was officially organised in 1880 by Cabrera, a former Catholic priest, and other former Catholic priests and Reformed ministers. In 1878 he had requested the Church of England to consecrate a bishop. In 1880 the (Anglican) Episcopal Church in the United States sent a missionary-bishop from Mexico to visit Spain and Portugal and contributed in organising the congregations into the IERE and the Lusitanian Catholic Apostolic Evangelical Church, each with its own synodical government.

At the synod of 1880, Cabrera was elected the first bishop of the IERE, under the pastoral care of William Plunket, 4th Baron Plunket, then Bishop of Meath and later Archbishop of Dublin. He had been interested in the two Iberian churches and determined to act to consecrate a bishop in Spain. The church remained without a bishop for a time after Cabrera died in 1916 and was placed under the authority of the Church of Ireland. For a lengthy period from 1935 to 1951 there was not a single episcopal visit to Spain. Fernando Cabrera, son of the church's first bishop, was elected to be the next bishop, but he died in 1954 before being consecrated. Fernando Cabrera served as rector of the Cathedral of the Redeemer for close to a half-century.

The IERE experienced persecution during the regime of General Francisco Franco. Prior to Franco's regime, beginning in the 1850s, the majority of the residents of Villaescusa belonged to the Episcopal Church, but, in 1936, the Franco government seized the church's building and the congregation declined. In 1954, Santos M. Molina was consecrated as a bishop. The consecration took place behind closed doors at his parish church in Seville. The ordaining bishops were from County Meath in Ireland and two bishops from the United States—Reginald Mallett from the Episcopal Diocese of Northern Indiana and Stephen Keeler from the Episcopal Diocese of Minnesota. Under Molina the church experienced a resurgence. During his episcopate the IERE signed agreements of intercommunion with numerous provinces of the Anglican Communion, including the Episcopal Church in the United States, the Church of Ireland, the Church of England, the Church in Wales, the Anglican Church of South Africa, the Episcopal Church of the Philippines and the Old Catholic Church.

In 1980 the IERE became an extra-provincial diocese under the metropolitan authority of the Archbishop of Canterbury.

== Bishops of the IERE ==
- Juan Bautista Cabrera Ibarz (1837–1916), first bishop (1896–1916)
- Santos Molina Zurita, second bishop (1954–1966)
- Ramón Taibo Sienes, third bishop (1967–1983)
- Arturo Sánchez Galán, fourth bishop (1983–1995)
- Carlos López Lozano (b. 1962), fifth bishop (from 1995)

== Liturgy ==
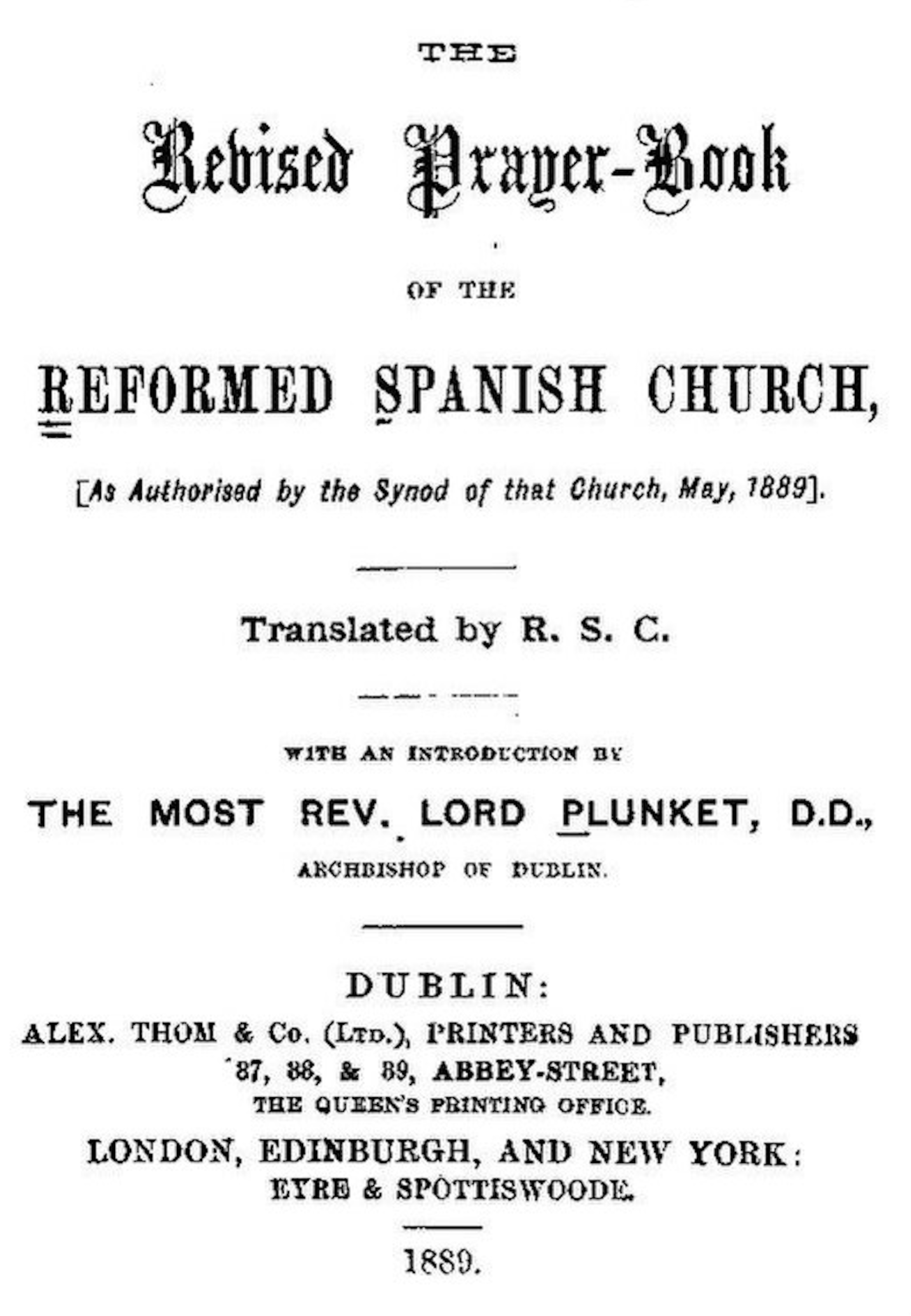
The Revised Prayer-Book of the Reformed Spanish Church, English translation of the 1889 revised prayer book used in the Spanish Reformed Episcopal Church

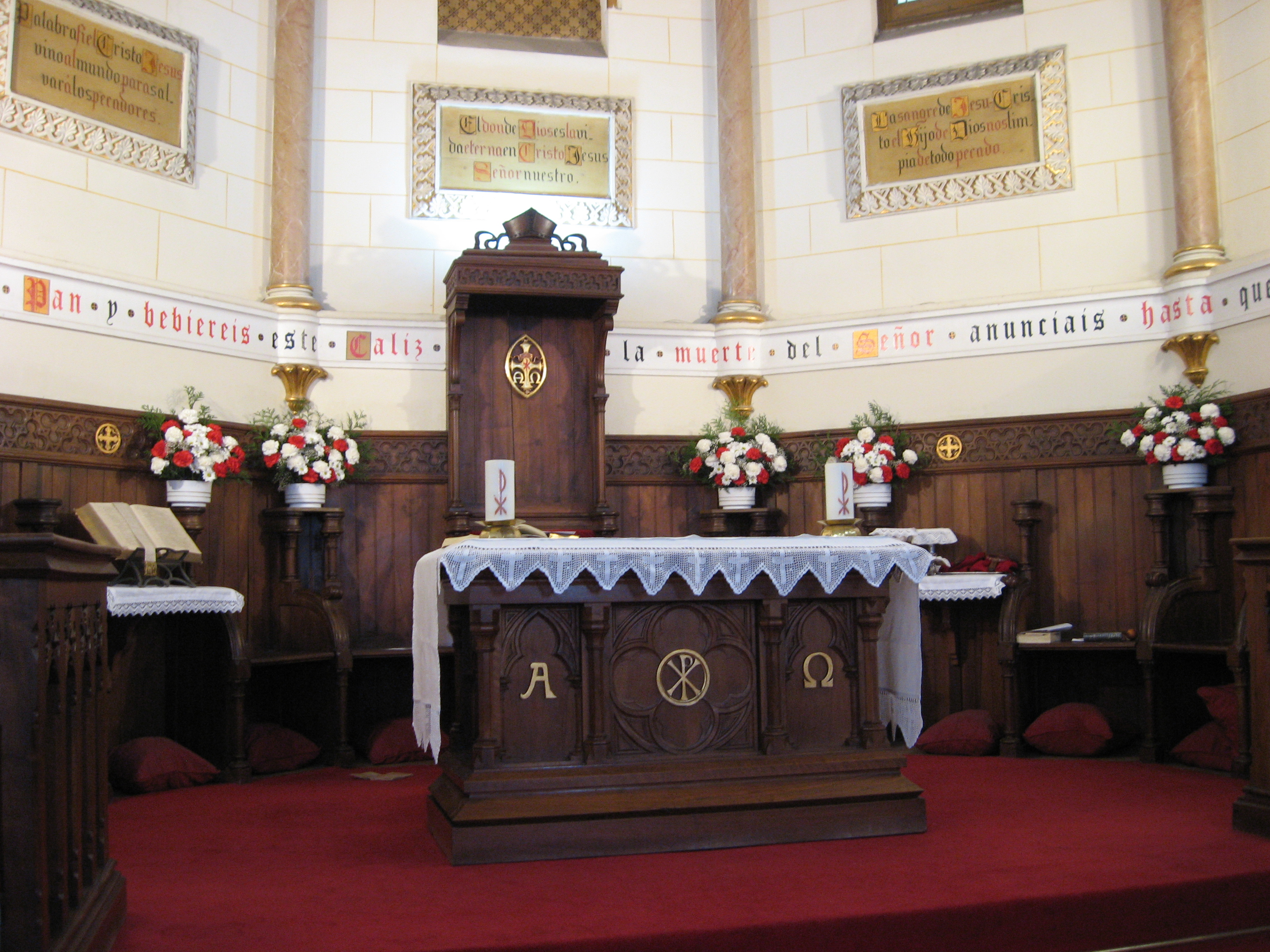
Interior of the Cathedral of the Redeemer

The IERE uses the Mozarabic Rite, also known as the Hispanic Rite, a Latin liturgical rite. It dates principally to the 7th and 8th centuries. St. Isidore of Seville (d. 636), who was influential at the Fourth Council of Toledo 633, according to the wishes of that council, gave the Hispanic Rite its final form before the Muslim conquest of Hispania. "Mozarab" is the term for the Christian population living under Muslim rulers in Al-Andalus.

Previous to its organisation, there were several translations of the Anglican Book of Common Prayer into Spanish in 1623 and in 1707.

In 1881 the church combined a Spanish translation of the 1662 edition of the Book of Common Prayer with the Mozarabic liturgy, which had recently been translated. This is apparently the first time the Spanish speaking Anglicans inserted their own "historic, national tradition of liturgical worship within an Anglican prayer book". A second edition was released in 1889 and a revision in 1975. This attempt combined the Anglican structure of worship with indigenous prayer traditions.

An experimental "Rito 1" or "Rite 1" for the church dating from 1984 has some distinctive features, one being that that after the presiding priest or bishop prays for the absolution of the sins of the congregation, the congregation responds by praying in turn for the absolution of the sins of the president: "God have mercy on you also, forgive you your sins through Jesus Christ and give you eternal life by the power of the Holy Spirit. Amen."

== Organisation ==
The IERE has a democratic, synodical (parliamentary) polity. The synod is the highest authority in the church; the laity and clergy have equal representation in it. The parishes are represented by one cleric and by one lay person. The synod elects the standing Committee, which governs the church between synods. The IERE is not a church with an episcopal government, like the Catholic Church, but is a synodical church governed by a bishop in synod. The bishop and the synod are required to work together in close co-operation. The current diocesan bishop is Carlos López Lozano, a Madrilene who was ordained as bishop by the Archbishop of Canterbury in November 1995.

The church is divided for administrative purposes into three zones: Catalonia, Valencian Country, and Balearic Islands; Andalusia and Canary Islands; Centre and Northern Spain. As of 2001, the IERE had one diocese and 22 licensed priests (one woman) serving 20 parishes, in Salamanca, Valencia, Valladolid, Seville, Oviedo, Tarragona, Murcia, Alicante, and Madrid.

== Affiliations ==
Together with the Church of England chaplaincies of the Diocese in Europe, the IERE is the representative of the Anglican Communion in Spain. It belongs to the Federation of Evangelical Religious Entities of Spain (FEDERE) and is member of the World Council of Churches and the Conference of European Churches. It is in full communion with the Old Catholic Churches as well as being part of the Porvoo Communion with the Scandinavian Lutheran churches.

== Bibliography ==
- Busquets, José. Cien Años de Testimonio: 1880–1980. Madrid: IERE, 1980.
- Church of England. The Lusitanian Church, Catholic, Apostolic, Evangelical, and the Spanish Reformed Episcopal Church. Report of the Commission Appointed by the Archbishop of Canterbury, Etc. [London]: Church Information Office, 1963.
- C., R. S., R. Stewart CLOUGH, and William Conyngham PLUNKET. The Revised Prayer-Book of the Reformed Spanish Church, As Authorised by the Synod of That Church, May, 1889. Translated by R.S.C. [I.E. R.S. Clough.] With an Introduction by the Most Rev. Lord Plunket, D.D., Archbishop of Dublin. Second Edition. Alex. Thom & Co: Dublin, 1894.
- Cruzado, J. Oficios Divinos Y Administracion De Los Sacramentos Y Otros Ritos En La Iglesia Española Reformada. Madrid, 1889.
- de Olaiz Fresno, Miguel. La Iglesia Catedral del Redentor. IERE: Madrid, 1994.
- Estruch, Juan. 1968. "HOW CAN THERE BE PROTESTANTS IN SPAIN?" The Ecumenical Review. 20, no. 1: 53-62. Notes: Mr. JUAN ESTRUCH is a layman of the Spanish Episcopal Reformed Church and is Youth Secretary for his Church. At present he is studying religious sociology at Louvain.
- Iglesia Española Reformada Episcopal. La Iglesia Episcopal En España = The Episcopal Church in Spain. [Madrid]: Departmento de Publicaciones de la IERE, 1984.
- Iglesia Española Reformada Episcopal, and Alexander R. C. Dallas. "The Declaration Set Forth by the Central Consistory of the Spanish Reformed Church: With Some Account of the Members and Their Meetings at Gibraltar on the 25th April and the 1st June, 1868". London: William Macintosh, 1868. Translated from the Spanish by the Rev. Alexander Dallas.
- Iglesia Española Reformada Episcopal, and Colin Ogilvie Buchanan. Liturgies of the Spanish and Portuguese Reformed Episcopal Churches. Grove, 1985. ISBN 1851740074; 9781851740079.
- Iglesia Española Reformada Episcopal, and William Conyngham Plunket Plunket. The Revised Prayer-Book of the Reformed Spanish Church: (As Authorised by the Synod of That Church, May, 1889). Dublin: Alex. Thom, 1894. Notes: Added t.p.: The Divine Office and administration of the sacraments and other ordinances in the Reformed Spanish Church. Madrid: Printed by J. Cruzado, 1889. Other Titles: Divine offices and administration of the sacraments and other ordinances in the Reformed Spanish Church. Oficios divinos y administracion de los sacramentos y otros ritos en la Iglesia Española reformada.
- Irwin, O. A. C. Pilgrim Churches: The Spanish and Portuguese Reformed Episcopal Churches. [London, England]: [Houghton & Sons, Ltd.], 1956.
- Liturgia de la Iglesia Española Reformada Episcopal (1954)
- Lopez Lozano, Carlos, Jefferey Rowthorn, Mbele-Mbong, Diana Webster, Fernando da Luz, Jeffery W. (Jeffery William), and Ken (John Kenneth). Churches of the Anglican Communion in Continental Europe: Diocese in Europe (Church of England), Convocation of American Churches in Europe (Episcopal Church of the USA), Lusitanian Catholic Apostolic Evangelical Church of Portugal, Spanish Episcopal Reformed Church. London, Madrid, Paris, Porto: College of Anglican Bishops in Continental Europe (COABICE), 1998.
- Noyes, H. E. Church Reform in Spain and Portugal: A Short History of the Reformed Episcopal Churches of Spain and Portugal, from 1868 to the Present Time 1897
- Palomino, Rafael. Spanish Reformed Episcopal Church. 2011. Abstract: The Spanish Reformed Episcopal Church belongs to the Anglican Communion and preserves the ancient Christian liturgy of the Visigoths and Mozarabs.
- Plunket, William C. The Divine Offices and Other Formularies of the Reformed Episcopal Churches of Spain and Portugal... (The Divine Offices and Administration of the Sacraments and Other Ordinances in the Spanish Church. 1882. Responsibility: translated in a condensed form by R. Stewart Clough. - The Book of Common Prayer, administration of the Sacraments, and other divine offices for the use of the Lusitanian Church. Translated from the Portuguese by the Rev. T. Godfrey P. Pope.) With an introduction by ... Lord Plunket ... Bishop of Meath.
- Reformation Movements in Foreign Churches (with Special Reference to Spain and Portugal), by William Conyngham Plunket (1885)
- Rowthorn, Jeffery. "Anglican Churches in Europe." Pages 439-442. IN: Hefling, Charles C., and Cynthia L. Shattuck.The Oxford Guide to the Book of Common Prayer: A Worldwide Survey. Oxford: Oxford University Press, 2006.
