= Francis Cherry (diplomat) =

English diplomat (1552–1605)

Sir Francis Cherry
- Born: 18 October 1552; North Kilworth, Leicestershire
- Died: 14 April 1605; All Hallows, Barking by the Tower, England
- Occupation: Diplomat

Sir Francis Cherry (18 October 1552 – 14 April 1605) of the parish of All Hallows, Barking, in Essex, Citizen of the City of London and a Merchant Vintner, was the English ambassador to the Court of Russia from April 1598 to 23 March 1599. He was knighted by Queen Elizabeth I on 4 July 1604 at Chatham in Kent, "for faithful and gallant service". He founded the Cherry family of Camberwell in Surrey.

Sir Francis Cherry was born on 18 October 1552 at North Kilworth in Leicestershire. He was the first of his family to settle at Camberwell. He died on 14 April 1605 and was buried at All Hallows' Church in Barking.

He married twice; his first wife died giving birth to her twelfth child, and his second wife Elizabeth (of unrecorded family) survived him and remarried (at St Olave's Church, Hart Street) (as his third wife) to Sir Thomas Hunt (d.1616) of Foulsham, Norfolk, whose mural monument with effigies of his three wives survives in the Church of the Holy Innocents, Foulsham. Sir Thomas Hunt then became associated with Camberwell. His issue included:

- Robert Cherry, who married Elizabeth Stukeley, a daughter of a certain Stukeley, of London, by whom he had issue a son Francis Cherry and daughter Elizabeth Cherry (baptised 2 March 1621), the wife of John Scott, Esq., of Camberwell.
