= Juan Bautista Cabrera =

Spanish Reformed Episcopal bishop

Juan Bautista Cabrera Ivars
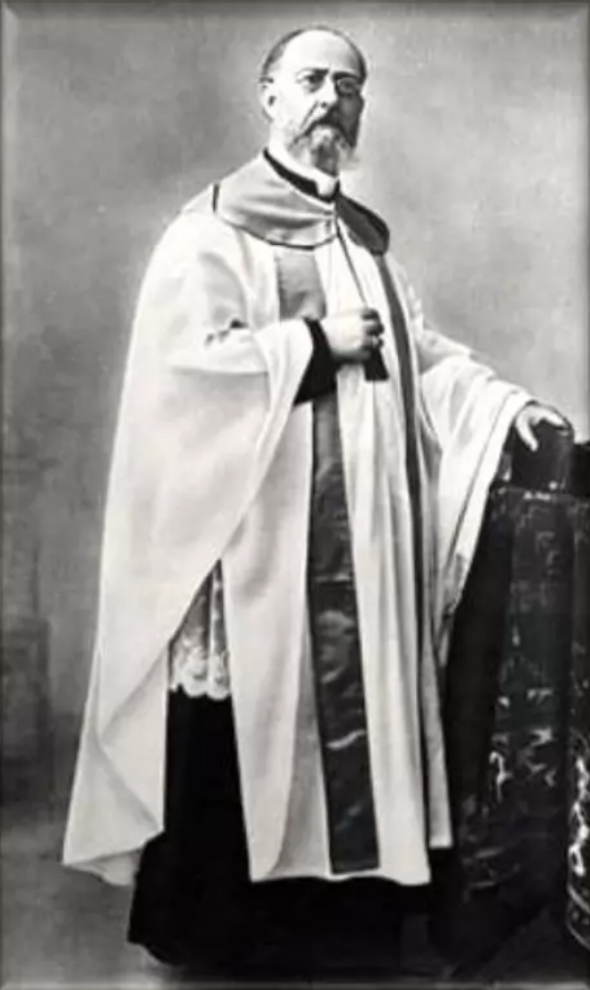
- Church: Spanish Reformed Episcopal Church

Personal details
- Born: 23 April 1837 Benissa, Alicante, Spain
- Died: 18 May 1916 (aged 79) Madrid, Spain
- Denomination: Anglican

Juan Bautista Cabrera Ibarz (sometimes spelled Ivars; 23 April 1837 – 18 May 1916) was the founding bishop of the Spanish Reformed Episcopal Church, originally the Spanish Reformed Church. He was also a Freemason, poet, theologian and translator, especially of Anglican works.

== Biography ==
Born on April 23, 1837, in Benissa, he was ordained a priest of the Piarist order in 1853. Having been influenced by Protestant ideas through correspondence, he sought refuge in Gibraltar in the summer of 1863. He married there and frequented both Methodist and Anglican churches.

After the Revolution of 1868 he returned to Spain and pastored a church in Seville. In 1880 a synod in Seville organized what would become the Spanish Reformed Episcopal Church, which is today a member of the Anglican Communion. The Church's liturgy incorporated Anglican and Mozarabic elements with some novel material composed by Cabrera himself. Throughout his career he composed lyrics for multiple existing tunes and translated other hymns to Spanish.

In 1894, Cabrera was consecrated as a bishop by three bishops of the Church of Ireland, including William Plunket, Archbishop of Dublin. He served as bishop of the Spanish Reformed Church until his death and died in 1916 in Madrid.

== See also ==
- Anglicanism in Spain
