= John Meyrick (ambassador) =

English diplomat and merchant (c. 1559–1639)

Sir John Meyrick (also spelled Merrick; c. 1559 – 1638/1639) was an English merchant in Russia; he became the English ambassador to Russia during the reign of Tsar Boris Godunov.

== Early life and career ==
Meyrick was the second son of William Meyrick or Merick, at one time of Gloucester, but afterwards of London. The father became one of the original members of the Muscovy Company, which was founded by Cabot in 1554, and before 1567 seems to have acted as agent of the company in Russia.

Meyrick's youth was spent at the factory of English merchants in Moscow. In 1584 he became the agent of the Muscovy Company at Yaroslavl, and in May 1592 he had a similar position in Moscow. By 1596 he had been admitted to membership of the Company, and had entered into partnership with his elder brother, Richard, who lived in Leadenhall Street.

The Company was reliant on the good will of the tsar, so Meyrick became increasingly involved in diplomatic affairs. Through 1596 and 1597 he forwarded from Russia much political intelligence to Queen Elizabeth, and on 14 March 1598 he reported the death of Tsar Feodor I. In 1600 he came home in the company of Mikulin who was sent as Russian ambassador to England. In that year he became an early subscriber to the East India Company.

== As ambassador ==
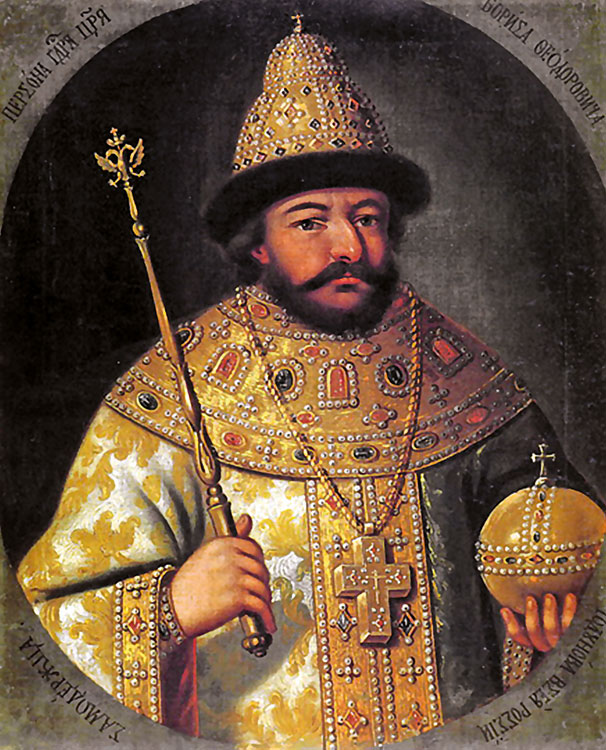
Boris Godunov

The new tsar, Boris Godunov, was anxious to find an English bride for his eldest son, and in February 1602 Meyrick was despatched as ambassador to the tsar, with instructions to strengthen the friendly relations between the two countries, but to treat the matrimonial proposals evasively.

Meyrick was honourably received by the emperor at the Kremlin Palace. He translated Elizabeth's letters to the tsar into Russian in a personal interview, and laid before him a pedigree of the English royal family. Elizabeth (Meyrick declared) had selected a daughter of the Earl of Derby as the tsarevitch's bride; but she was eighteen years old, and seeing that the Russian prince was only thirteen, Meyrick argued that the union was undesirable.

Meyrick remained in Russia till June. On 22 June he had a final audience with the tsar, who promised full protection to English merchants, and sent cordial greetings to Elizabeth, besides entrusting Meyrick with four Russian youths of high birth to be educated in England. Meyrick journeyed home in July. A full account of his embassy, written by himself, was printed by Sir Samuel Rush Meyrick in The Gentleman's Magazine (1824, pt. ii. pp. 226 sq).

== After Boris Godunov ==
Meyrick soon returned to Russia. In 1603 he forwarded as a gift to the Bodleian Library in Oxford, two Russian manuscripts: a bible and Canones Patrum Muscov. In October 1603 his partner and brother, Richard, died in London, and John was described in the dying man's will as "then residing in Muscovy".

After the death in 1605 of Tsar Boris, the utmost confusion prevailed in Moscow. An impostor known as False Dmitry I seized the throne, but Meyrick obtained from him protection for English commerce, and when in 1606 Vasily IV became tsar, Meyrick was again successful in obtaining a renewal of the privileges previously accorded to his fellow-countrymen. Political disturbances compelled Meyrick to remove at times from Moscow to Arkhangelsk and Kholmogory, and late in 1606 he returned to England to report the progress of affairs. He was soon, however, again acting as "agent" in Russia, but paid another visit to London in 1611.

In 1614 he was reappointed English ambassador to the tsar's court, with full powers to use his influence to reduce the anarchy prevailing in the Russian government. Before his departure James I knighted him at Greenwich (13 June 1614). He travelled with forty-four people, and with a large sum of money to be advanced, if need be, to the tsar and his ministers.

== Mediation between Russia and Sweden ==
Meyrick's mission proved successful. Michael I, of the house of Romanov, was securely installed on the throne, and Meyrick took part in the negotiations for bringing to a close the long-standing warfare between Russia and Sweden.

In 1615 he journeyed to Staraya Russa, and met envoys from the two countries, as well as commissioners from Holland, who agreed to take part in the mediation. On 4 March 1616 an armistice for three months was arranged under Meyrick's guidance; on 20 November, owing to his intercession with Gustavus Adolphus of Sweden, the Swedes raised the siege of Narva; and on 27 February 1617 he helped to secure the Treaty of Stolbovo, which bore his signature as that of one of the contracting parties. In November 1617 Meyrick came again to England, accompanied by an elaborate embassy from Russia, and bearing rich presents from the tsar to James I.

== Last years and death ==
On 19 October 1620 he was reappointed English envoy at Moscow, directed to negotiate a commercial treaty and to recover money recently lent to the tsar. In 1623 a commercial treaty – the first of its kind – was signed by Meyrick and the tsar's councillors. In 1628 he was still in Moscow, and was governor of the Muscovy Company. He died ten years later, credited at the time with more knowledge of Russia than any other Englishman.

In his will he desired that he might be buried in his parish church of St Andrew Undershaft, if he died in London, and he bequeathed £100 to the Merchant Taylors' Company, with £300 to be lent to scholars of the company's school on their commencing business; he also left legacies to many London parishes and hospitals. His wife Frances, daughter of Sir Francis Cherry, also a Russia merchant, predeceased him; she had no issue.

== See also ==
- List of Ambassadors of the Kingdom of England to Russia
- Time of Troubles
