= 1982 Roller Hockey World Cup =

International sporting competition

Roller Hockey Men's World Championships

Tournament details
- Host country: Portugal
- Teams: 22 (from 6 confederations)
- Venue(s): 1 (in 1 host city)

Final positions
- Champions: Portugal (12th title)
- Runners-up: Spain
- Third place: Argentina
- Fourth place: Chile

Tournament statistics
- Matches played: 161
- Goals scored: 1,610 (10 per match)

The 1982 Roller Hockey World Cup was the twenty-fifth roller hockey world cup, organized by the Fédération Internationale de Roller Sports. It was contested by 22 national teams (9 from Europe, 5 from South America, 4 from North America, 2 from Oceania, 1 from Africa and 1 from Asia). All the games were played in the city of Barcelos, in Portugal, the chosen city to host the World Cup.

== Group stage ==
=== Group A ===
Team	ESP	BRA	FRG	NZL	VEN
Spain					
Brazil	1–6				
West Germany	1–4	0–4			
New Zealand	1–10	0–8	1–2		
Venezuela	0–13	0–10	0–10	2–4	

Team	Pld	W	D	L	GF	GA	GD	Pts	Qualification
Spain	4	4	0	0	33	3	+30	8	Advancing to final-twelve
Brazil	4	3	0	1	23	6	+17	6	Advancing to final-twelve
West Germany	4	2	0	2	13	9	+4	4	Advancing to final-twelve
New Zealand	4	1	0	3	6	22	−16	2	
Venezuela	4	0	0	4	2	37	−35	0	

=== Group B ===
Team	ARG	COL	USA	FRA	ENG	JPN
Argentina						
Colombia	3–13					
United States	3–5	13–1				
France	1–9	3–3	3–6			
England	0–8	0–5	2–4	5–5		
Japan	1–39	3–9	1–22	3–7	0–10	

Team	Pld	W	D	L	GF	GA	GD	Pts	Qualification
Argentina	5	5	0	0	76	8	+68	10	Advancing to final-twelve
United States	5	4	0	1	48	12	+36	8	Advancing to final-twelve
Colombia	5	2	1	2	21	34	−13	5	Advancing to final-twelve
France	5	1	2	2	19	26	−7	4	
England	5	1	1	3	17	22	−5	3	
Japan	5	0	0	5	8	87	−79	0	

=== Group C ===
Team	ITA	POR	AUS	ANG	GUA
Italy					
Portugal	6–1				
Australia	2–11	1–8			
Angola	6–7	2–11	1–1		
Guatemala	0–29	1–52	1–28	2–30	

Team	Pld	W	D	L	GF	GA	GD	Pts	Qualification
Portugal	4	4	0	0	77	5	+72	8	Advancing to final-twelve
Italy	4	3	0	1	48	14	+34	6	Advancing to final-twelve
Angola	4	1	1	2	39	21	+18	3	Advancing to final-twelve
Australia	4	1	1	2	32	21	+11	3	
Guatemala	4	0	0	4	4	139	−135	0	

=== Group D ===
Team	NED	SWI	CHI	MEX	CAN	IRE
Netherlands						
Switzerland	1–7					
Chile	0–4	3–2				
Mexico	0–9	1–4	0–9			
Canada	2–14	4–10	1–12	8–9		
Ireland	1–27	1–30	0–23	3–10	1–11	

Team	Pld	W	D	L	GF	GA	GD	Pts	Qualification
Netherlands	5	5	0	0	61	4	+57	10	Advancing to final-twelve
Chile	5	4	0	1	47	7	+40	8	Advancing to final-twelve
Switzerland	5	3	0	2	47	16	+31	6	Advancing to final-twelve
Mexico	5	2	0	3	20	33	−13	4	
Canada	5	1	0	4	26	46	−20	2	
Ireland	5	0	0	5	6	101	−95	0	

== Final phase ==
=== 13th to 22nd play-off ===
Team	IRE	CAN	GUA	ENG	AUS	MEX	VEN	NZL	JPN	FRA
Ireland										
Canada	8–1									
Guatemala	3–3	2–14								
England	24–0	13–3	26–0							
Australia	19–2	5–3	26–0	4–8						
Mexico	14–2	5–4	14–1	1–5	1–10					
Venezuela	9–3	1–3	5–2	2–6	1–10	0–4				
New Zealand	9–2	7–3	13–1	1–1	2–3	2–2	4–1			
Japan	4–1	1–0	8–0	0–7	3–12	1–7	7–1	1–5		
France	21–0	7–2	27–1	10–5	6–5	7–0	13–2	10–0	13–2	

Team	Pld	W	D	L	GF	GA	GD	Pts
France	9	9	0	0	114	17	+97	18
England	9	7	1	1	95	21	+74	15
Australia	9	7	0	2	94	26	+68	14
New Zealand	9	5	2	2	43	24	+19	12
Mexico	9	5	1	3	48	34	+14	11
Japan	9	4	0	5	27	46	−19	8
Canada	9	3	0	6	40	42	−2	6
Venezuela	9	2	0	7	22	52	−30	4
Ireland	9	0	1	8	16	111	−95	1
Guatemala	9	0	1	8	10	136	−126	1

=== Final-twelve ===
Team	COL	SWI	ANG	ARG	ITA	USA	CHI	BRA	FRG	NED	ESP	POR
Colombia												
Switzerland	7–5											
Angola	4–1	1–3										
Argentina	10–5	4–1	6–0									
Italy	3–1	3–0	16–1	1–4								
United States	5–6	1–1	4–0	1–3	0–0							
Chile	7–3	5–1	4–2	0–1	6–6	2–2						
Brazil	13–3	2–3	5–1	1–4	1–4	4–5	5–5					
West Germany	4–1	1–0	7–0	0–1	3–4	4–5	0–4	2–2				
Netherlands	5–4	2–3	2–1	0–1	2–3	1–4	2–7	5–1	2–4			
Spain	9–0	6–1	12–1	4–3	6–2	6–4	2–2	5–3	5–0	2–2		
Portugal	18–0	4–1	5–2	3–0	3–1	6–1	4–3	6–1	3–1	2–2	5–3	

Team	Pld	W	D	L	GF	GA	GD	Pts
(gold) Portugal (C)	11	10	1	0	59	15	+44	21
(silver) Spain	11	8	2	1	60	23	+37	18
(bronze) Argentina	11	9	0	2	37	16	+21	18
Chile	11	5	4	2	45	28	+17	14
Italy	11	6	2	3	43	27	+16	14
United States	11	4	3	4	32	33	−1	11
West Germany	11	4	1	6	26	28	−2	9
Switzerland	11	4	1	6	21	34	−13	9
Netherlands	11	3	2	6	25	32	−7	8
Brazil	11	2	2	7	38	42	−4	6
Angola	11	1	0	10	13	65	−52	2
Colombia	11	1	0	10	29	85	−56	2

(C) 1982 World Champion

== Standings ==
	Team
1st place, gold medalist(s)	Portugal
2nd place, silver medalist(s)	Spain
3rd place, bronze medalist(s)	Argentina
4th	Chile
5th	Italy
6th	United States
7th	West Germany
8th	Switzerland
9th	Netherlands
10th	Brazil
11th	Angola
12th	Colombia
13th	France
14th	England
15th	Australia
16th	New Zealand
17th	Mexico
18th	Japan
19th	Canada
20th	Venezuela
21st	Ireland
22nd	Guatemala

== See also ==
- FIRS Roller Hockey World Cup
