= 2019 Roller Hockey World Cup =

2019 Men's Roller Hockey World Cup
Tournament details
- Host country: Spain
- City: Barcelona
- Dates: 7–14 July 2019
- Teams: 27 (from 4 confederations)
- Venue(s): 4 (in 4 host cities)

Final positions
- Champions: Portugal (16th title)
- Runners-up: Argentina
- Third place: Spain
- Fourth place: France

The 2019 Men's Roller Hockey World Cup was the 44th edition of the Roller Hockey World Cup, organised by World Skate. The tournament was held in Spain, in the city of Barcelona, as part of the 2019 World Roller Games.

== Competition format ==
Teams qualified to the three cups by their continental tournaments. Finally, eight teams composed the World Championship (first tier) and the Intercontinental Championship (second tier), while twelve teams composed the Challenger's Championship.

Teams were divided into groups of four teams for composing the group stage. The two last qualified teams of the World Championship and the two group winners of the Intercontinental Championship faced in a playoff where the two winners played the knockout stage of the World Cup. This playoff was played between the two best group winners of the Challenger's Cup and the two last qualified teams of the Intercontinental Championship.

== World Championship ==
=== Qualified teams ===
Event	Location	Berths	Qualified
Africa	Angola	1	Angola
America	Colombia	3	Argentina; Chile; Colombia
Europe	Spain	4	France; Italy; Portugal; Spain

=== Group stage ===
==== Group A ====
Pos	Team	Pld	W	D	L	GF	GA	GD	Pts	Qualification	(Spain)	(France)	(Italy)	(Angola)
1	Spain	3	3	0	0	14	6	+8	9	Quarterfinals	—	3–1	—	—
2	France	3	1	1	1	8	8	0	4	Quarterfinals	—	—	—	3–3
3	Italy	3	1	0	2	10	13	−3	3	Quarterfinals	3–5	2–4	—	—
4	Angola	3	0	1	2	9	14	−5	1	Playoffs	2–6	—	4–5	—

Source: World Roller Games

==== Group B ====
Pos	Team	Pld	W	D	L	GF	GA	GD	Pts	Qualification	(Argentina)	(Portugal)	(Chile)	(Colombia)
1	Argentina	3	2	1	0	17	4	+13	7	Quarterfinals	—	1–1	—	7–1
2	Portugal	3	2	1	0	18	7	+11	7	Quarterfinals	—	—	—	8–2
3	Chile	3	1	0	2	10	21	−11	3	Quarterfinals	2–9	4–9	—	—
4	Colombia	3	0	0	3	6	19	−13	0	Playoffs	—	—	3–4	—

Source: World Roller Games

=== Knockout stage ===
Playoffs
10 July
Colombia	6
Switzerland	5
10 July
Angola	6
Mozambique	1

Quarter-finals
11 July
Colombia	0
Spain	9
11 July
Portugal (p)	5 (2)
Italy	5 (0)
11 July
Argentina	6
Angola	0
11 July
Chile	4
France	5

Semi-finals
12 July
Spain	2
Portugal (a.e.t.)	4
12 July
Argentina	3
France	0

Final
14 July
Portugal (p)	0 (2)
Argentina	0 (1)
Third place
14 July
Spain	5
France	0

==== Fifth to eight position ====
Semi-finals
12 July
Colombia	5
Italy	8
12 July
Angola (a.e.t.)	7
Chile	4

Fifth position game
13 July
Italy	6
Angola	4
Seventh position game
13 July
Colombia	8
Chile	11

== Intercontinental Cup ==
=== Qualified teams ===
Event	Location	Berths	Qualified
Africa	Angola	2	Egypt; Mozambique
America	Colombia	1	Brazil
Asia	South Korea	1	Australia
Europe	Spain	4	Andorra; England; Germany; Switzerland

=== Group stage ===
==== Group A ====
Pos	Team	Pld	W	D	L	GF	GA	GD	Pts	Qualification	(Mozambique)	(Andorra)	(England)	(Egypt)
1	Mozambique	3	3	0	0	25	6	+19	9	Playoffs to World Championship	—	—	—	16–2
2	Andorra	3	2	0	1	13	7	+6	6	Quarterfinals	1–3	—	4–3	—
3	England	3	1	0	2	18	11	+7	3	Quarterfinals	3–6	—	—	12–1
4	Egypt	3	0	0	3	4	36	−32	0	Quarterfinals	—	1–8	—	—

Source: World Roller Games

==== Group B ====
Pos	Team	Pld	W	D	L	GF	GA	GD	Pts	Qualification	(Switzerland)	(Germany)	(Brazil)	(Australia)
1	Switzerland	3	3	0	0	25	5	+20	9	Playoffs to World Championship	—	—	—	12–1
2	Germany	3	2	0	1	23	8	+15	6	Quarterfinals	1–5	—	6–3	—
3	Brazil	3	1	0	2	10	16	−6	3	Quarterfinals	3–8	—	—	4–2
4	Australia	3	0	0	3	3	32	−29	0	Quarterfinals	—	0–16	—	—

Source: World Roller Games

=== Knockout stage ===
Quarter-finals
11 July
Switzerland	8
Egypt	1
11 July
Brazil	3
Andorra	9
11 July
Australia	3
Mozambique	23
11 July
Germany	4
England	1

Semi-finals
12 July
Switzerland	3
Andorra	4
12 July
Mozambique (a.e.t.)	7
Germany	5

Final
13 July
Andorra	3
Mozambique	4
Third place
13 July
Switzerland	7
Germany	4

==== Fifth to eight position ====
Semi-finals
12 July
Egypt	1
Brazil	12
12 July
England	6
Australia	2

Fifth position game
13 July
Brazil	3
England	7
Seventh position game
13 July
Egypt	4
Australia	5

== Challenger Championship ==
=== Qualified teams ===
Event	Location	Berths	Qualified
America	Colombia	3	~~Mexico~~ (Note: Mexico withdrew after the draw.); Uruguay; United States
Asia	South Korea	6	China; Chinese Taipei; India; Japan; Macau; New Zealand
Europe	Spain	3	Austria; Belgium; Netherlands

=== Group stage ===
==== Group A ====
Pos	Team	Pld	W	D	L	GF	GA	GD	Pts	Qualification	(Belgium)	(Uruguay)	(Austria)	(Japan)	(New Zealand)	(Chinese Taipei)
1	Belgium	5	4	0	1	40	15	+25	12	Classification games	—	7–1	—	—	—	16–4
2	Uruguay	5	4	0	1	32	13	+19	12	Classification games	—	—	—	3–2	10–1	14–0
3	Austria	5	3	0	2	37	12	+25	9	Classification games	4–6	3–4	—	8–1	—	15–0
4	Japan	5	3	0	2	20	20	0	9	Classification games	4–3	—	—	—	6–2	—
5	New Zealand	5	1	0	4	14	36	−22	3	Classification games	2–8	—	1–7	—	—	8–5
6	Chinese Taipei	5	0	0	5	13	60	−47	0		—	—	—	4–7	—	—

Source: World Roller Games

==== Group B ====
Pos	Team	Pld	W	D	L	GF	GA	GD	Pts	Qualification	(Netherlands)	(India)	(United States)	(Macau)	(China)
1	Netherlands	4	4	0	0	81	10	+71	12	Classification games	—	15–6	8–2	—	—
2	India	4	2	0	2	52	29	+23	6	Classification games	—	—	—	9–8	—
3	United States	4	2	0	2	41	21	+20	6	Classification games	—	4–2	—	10–11	25–0
4	Macau	4	2	0	2	35	39	−4	6	Classification games	2–20	—	—	—	14–0
5	China	4	0	0	4	2	112	−110	0	Classification games	0–38	2–35	—	—	—

Source: World Roller Games

=== Classification matches ===
All matches were played on 13 July.

Team 1	Score	Team 2
Belgium	0–8	Netherlands
Uruguay	4–0	India
Austria	10–4	United States
Japan	7–8	Macau
New Zealand	11–2	China

== Final standings ==
Pos.	Team	G	Pld	W	D	L	Pts	GF	GA	GD
1	Portugal	B	6	3	3	0	12	27	14	+13
2	Argentina	B	6	4	2	0	14	26	4	+22
3	Spain	A	6	5	0	1	15	30	10	+20
4	France	A	6	2	1	3	7	13	20	−7
Played the knockout stage
5	Italy	A	6	3	1	2	10	29	27	+2
6	Angola	A	7	2	1	4	7	26	31	−5
7	Chile	B	6	2	0	4	6	29	41	−12
8	Colombia	B	7	1	0	6	3	25	52	−27
Played the Intercontinental Cup
9	Mozambique	A	7	6	0	1	18	60	23	+37
10	Andorra	A	6	4	0	2	12	29	17	+12
13	Switzerland	B	7	4	1	2	13	44	19	+25
10	Germany	B	6	3	1	2	10	35	19	+16
13	England	A	6	3	0	3	9	32	20	+12
14	Brazil	B	6	2	0	4	6	28	33	−5
15	Australia	B	6	1	0	5	3	13	65	−52
16	Egypt	A	6	0	0	6	0	10	61	−51
Played the Challenger Cup
17	Netherlands	B	5	5	0	0	15	89	10	+79
18	Belgium	A	6	4	0	2	12	40	23	+17
19	Uruguay	A	6	5	0	1	15	36	13	+23
20	India	B	5	2	0	3	6	52	33	+19
21	Austria	A	6	4	0	2	12	47	16	+31
22	United States	B	5	2	0	3	6	45	31	+14
23	Macau	B	5	3	0	2	9	43	48	−5
24	Japan	A	6	3	0	3	9	27	28	−1
25	New Zealand	A	6	2	0	4	6	25	38	−13
26	China	B	5	0	0	5	0	4	123	−119
27	Chinese Taipei	A	5	0	0	5	0	13	60	−47
