= 1980 Roller Hockey World Cup =

Roller Hockey Men's World Championships
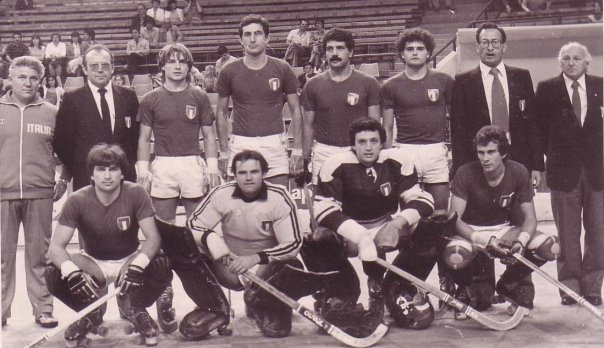

Tournament details
- Host country: Chile
- Teams: 16 (from 5 confederations)
- Venue(s): 1 (in 1 host city)

Final positions
- Champions: Spain (9th title)
- Runners-up: Argentina
- Third place: Portugal
- Fourth place: Chile

Tournament statistics
- Matches played: 80
- Goals scored: 734 (9.18 per match)

The 1980 Roller Hockey World Cup was the twenty-fourth roller hockey world cup, organized by the Fédération Internationale de Roller Sports. It was contested by 16 national teams (6 from Europe, 4 from South America, 2 from North America, 2 from Asia and 2 from Oceania). All the games were played in the city of Talcahuano, in Chile, the chosen city to host the World Cup.

== Group stage ==
=== Group A ===
Team	NED	JPN	ARG	IND
Netherlands		14–2	2–4	40–0
Japan			0–18	19–0
Argentina				31–0
India				

Team	Pld	W	D	L	GF	GA	GD	Pts	Qualification
Argentina	3	3	0	0	53	2	+51	6	Advancing to final-eight
Netherlands	3	2	0	1	56	6	+50	4	Advancing to final-eight
Japan	3	1	0	2	21	32	−11	2	
India	3	0	0	3	0	90	−90	0	

=== Group B ===
Team	ESP	AUS	ITA	CAN
Spain		3–1	1–1	21–1
Australia			1–9	6–0
Italy				13–0
Canada				

Team	Pld	W	D	L	GF	GA	GD	Pts	Qualification
Spain	3	2	1	0	25	3	+22	5	Advancing to final-eight
Italy	3	2	1	0	23	2	+21	5	Advancing to final-eight
Australia	3	1	0	2	8	12	−4	2	
Canada	3	0	0	3	1	40	−39	0	

=== Group C ===
Team	POR	NZL	USA	FRA
Portugal		13–0	6–2	5–1
New Zealand			3–11	2–6
United States				7–3
France				

Team	Pld	W	D	L	GF	GA	GD	Pts	Qualification
Portugal	3	3	0	0	24	3	+21	6	Advancing to final-eight
United States	3	2	0	1	20	12	+8	4	Advancing to final-eight
France	3	1	0	2	10	14	−4	2	
New Zealand	3	0	0	3	5	30	−25	0	

=== Group D ===
Team	BRA	SWI	CHI	COL
Brazil		6–1	3–2	6–2
Switzerland			0–2	7–4
Chile				12–1
Colombia				

Team	Pld	W	D	L	GF	GA	GD	Pts	Qualification
Brazil	3	3	0	0	15	5	+10	6	Advancing to final-eight
Chile	3	2	0	1	16	4	+12	4	Advancing to final-eight
Switzerland	3	1	0	2	8	12	−4	2	
Colombia	3	0	0	3	7	25	−18	0	

== Final phase ==
=== 9th to 16th play-off ===
Team	NZL	JPN	AUS	COL	IND	FRA	CAN	SWI
New Zealand		4–4	0–3	3–11	21–1	3–6	V/D	0–5
Japan			D/V	6–8	17–1	4–6	5–8	0–11
Australia				2–3	20–0	1–2	12–0	D/V
Colombia					V/D	2–7	8–2	1–5
India						4–6	0–8	0–56
France							6–4	D/D
Canada								1–13
Switzerland								

Team	Pld	W	D	L	GF	GA	GD	Pts
Switzerland	7	6	1	0	90	2	+88	13
France	7	6	1	0	33	18	+15	13
Colombia	7	5	0	2	33	25	+8	10
Australia	7	4	0	3	38	4	+34	8
New Zealand	7	2	1	4	31	30	+1	5
Canada	7	2	0	5	23	44	−21	4
Japan	7	1	1	5	36	38	−2	3
India	7	0	0	7	6	128	−122	0

=== Final-eight ===
Team	USA	POR	ITA	CHI	NED	ESP	ARG	BRA
United States		1–2	1–2	2–3	0–4	3–5	1–4	1–7
Portugal			2–2	4–2	2–4	1–2	8–2	4–4
Italy				2–4	4–2	1–3	0–4	3–4
Chile					2–5	0–1	1–1	2–1
Netherlands						0–4	0–7	4–5
Spain							1–7	2–1
Argentina								6–2
Brazil								

Team	Pld	W	D	L	GF	GA	GD	Pts
(gold) Spain (C)	7	6	0	1	18	13	+5	12
(silver) Argentina	7	5	1	1	31	13	+18	11
(bronze) Portugal	7	3	2	2	23	17	+6	8
Chile	7	3	1	3	14	16	−2	7
Brazil	7	3	1	3	24	22	+2	7
Netherlands	7	3	0	4	19	24	−5	6
Italy	7	2	1	4	14	20	−6	5
United States	7	0	0	7	9	27	−18	0

(C) Champions

== Standings ==
	Team
1st place, gold medalist(s)	Spain
2nd place, silver medalist(s)	Argentina
3rd place, bronze medalist(s)	Portugal
4th	Chile
5th	Brazil
6th	Netherlands
7th	Italy
8th	United States
9th	Switzerland
10th	France
11th	Colombia
12th	Australia
13th	New Zealand
14th	Canada
15th	Japan
16th	India

== See also ==
- FIRS Roller Hockey World Cup
