= 1976 Roller Hockey World Cup =

Roller Hockey Men's World Championships

Tournament details
- Host country: Spain
- Dates: 11 September 1976– 21 September 1976
- Teams: 12 (from 5 confederations)
- Venue(s): 1 (in 1 host city)

Final positions
- Champions: Spain (8th title)
- Runners-up: Argentina
- Third place: Portugal
- Fourth place: West Germany

Tournament statistics
- Matches played: 66
- Goals scored: 493 (7.47 per match)

The 1976 Roller Hockey World Cup was the twenty-second roller hockey world cup, organized by the Fédération Internationale de Roller Sports. It was contested by 12 national teams (6 from Europe, 2 from South America, 2 from Oceania, 1 from North America and 1 from Asia). All the games were played in the city of Oviedo, in Spain, the chosen city to host the World Cup.

== Results ==
Team	BRA	JPN	NED	USA	ITA	AUS	ESP	FRA	POR	FRG	NZL	ARG
Brazil												
Japan	0–8											
Netherlands	1–4	8–0										
United States	2–4	14–0	3–3									
Italy	4–1	8–0	4–4	2–6								
Australia	0–3	7–0	3–0	0–5	2–8							
Spain	6–1	23–0	5–1	2–1	13–0	9–2						
France	4–3	4–0	3–1	2–6	3–3	5–0	1–13					
Portugal	6–2	23–2	5–2	4–1	2–1	12–0	1–2	11–2				
West Germany	4–1	9–1	2–4	2–2	0–0	8–0	0–3	5–1	3–3			
New Zealand	2–5	10–2	3–7	1–7	1–6	2–7	0–16	1–7	2–11	1–5		
Argentina	3–1	8–1	5–3	3–3	5–1	4–1	4–4	5–1	1–0	1–2	6–1	

== Standings ==
Team	Pld	W	D	L	GF	GA	GD	Pts
(gold) Spain (C)	11	10	1	0	96	11	+85	21
(silver) Argentina	11	8	2	1	45	18	+27	18
(bronze) Portugal	11	8	1	2	78	18	+60	17
West Germany	11	6	3	2	40	17	+23	15
United States	11	5	3	3	50	23	+27	13
Italy	11	4	3	4	36	37	−1	11
France	11	5	1	5	33	48	−15	11
Brazil	11	5	0	6	33	32	+1	10
Netherlands	11	3	2	6	30	37	−7	8
Australia	11	3	0	8	22	56	−34	6
New Zealand	11	1	0	10	24	79	−55	2
Japan	11	0	0	11	6	122	−116	0

(C) 1976 World Champion

== See also ==
- FIRS Roller Hockey World Cup
