= 1989 Roller Hockey World Cup =

Roller Hockey Men's A World Championships

Tournament details
- Host country: Argentina
- Teams: 12 (from 5 confederations)
- Venue(s): 1 (in 1 host city)

Final positions
- Champions: Spain (10th title)
- Runners-up: Portugal
- Third place: Italy
- Fourth place: Chile

Tournament statistics
- Matches played: 48
- Goals scored: 393 (8.19 per match)

The 1989 Roller Hockey World Cup was the twenty-ninth roller hockey world cup, organized by the Fédération Internationale de Roller Sports. It was contested by 12 national teams (6 from Europe, 3 from South America, 1 from North America, 1 from Africa and 1 from Oceania). All the games were played in the city of San Juan, in Argentina, the chosen city to host the World Cup.

== Venue ==
San Juan	San Juan (Argentina)
Estadio Aldo Cantoni	San Juan (Argentina)
Capacity: 8,000	San Juan (Argentina)

== Group stage ==
=== Group A ===
Team	COL	ANG	CHI	USA	POR	ITA
Colombia						
Angola	3–2					
Chile	5–2	4–4				
United States	4–1	3–1	3–3			
Portugal	10–2	5–1	3–1	9–3		
Italy	12–1	6–0	2–1	3–4	2–0	

Team	Pld	W	D	L	GF	GA	GD	Pts	Qualification
Italy	5	4	0	1	25	6	+19	8	Advancing to quarter-finals
Portugal	5	4	0	1	27	9	+18	8	Advancing to quarter-finals
United States	5	3	1	1	17	17	0	7	Advancing to quarter-finals
Chile	5	1	2	2	14	14	0	4	Advancing to quarter-finals
Angola	5	1	1	3	9	20	−11	3	
Colombia	5	0	0	5	8	34	−26	0	

=== Group B ===
Team	AUS	SWI	NED	FRG	ESP	ARG
Australia						
Switzerland	6–3					
Netherlands	7–5	4–5				
West Germany	5–1	5–2	4–5			
Spain	19–0	14–1	8–2	9–1		
Argentina	8–3	9–0	7–3	7–1	3–2	

Team	Pld	W	D	L	GF	GA	GD	Pts	Qualification
Argentina	5	5	0	0	34	9	+25	10	Advancing to quarter-finals
Spain	5	4	0	1	52	7	+45	8	Advancing to quarter-finals
West Germany	5	2	0	3	16	24	−8	4	Advancing to quarter-finals
Netherlands	5	2	0	3	21	29	−8	4	Advancing to quarter-finals
Switzerland	5	2	0	3	14	35	−21	4	
Australia	5	0	0	5	12	45	−33	0	

== Final phase ==
=== 9th to 12th play-off ===
Team	COL	SWI	AUS	ANG
Colombia				
Switzerland	4–3			
Australia	4–4	3–2		
Angola	4–3	2–2	6–3	

Team	Pld	W	D	L	GF	GA	GD	Pts
Angola	3	2	1	0	12	8	+4	5
Australia	3	1	1	1	10	12	−2	3
Switzerland	3	1	1	1	8	8	0	3
Colombia	3	0	1	2	10	12	−2	1

=== Final round ===
Quarter-finals
San Juan
Spain	6
United States	1
San Juan
Italy	7
Netherlands	1
San Juan
Portugal	10
West Germany	3
San Juan
Chile	3
Argentina	2

Semi-finals
San Juan
Spain	2
Italy	1
San Juan
Portugal	4
Chile	1

Final
San Juan
(gold) Spain	2
(silver) Portugal	1
Third place
San Juan
(bronze) Italy	11
Chile	2

Fifth–eighth places
San Juan
United States	4
Netherlands	6
San Juan
West Germany	3
Argentina	12

Fifth place
San Juan
Netherlands	2
Argentina	13
Seventh place
San Juan
United States	2
West Germany	5

== Standings ==
	Team
1st place, gold medalist(s)	Spain
2nd place, silver medalist(s)	Portugal
3rd place, bronze medalist(s)	Italy
4th	Chile
5th	Argentina
6th	Netherlands
7th	West Germany
8th	United States
9th	Angola
10th	Australia
11th	Switzerland
12th	Colombia

== See also ==
- FIRS Roller Hockey World Cup
