= 2013 FIRS Men's Roller Hockey World Cup =

2013 FIRS Roller Hockey World Cup
Tournament details
- Host country: Angola
- Dates: 20–28 September 2013
- Teams: 16 (from 5 confederations)
- Venue(s): Luanda, Namibe (in 2 host cities)

Final positions
- Champions: Spain (16th title)
- Runners-up: Argentina
- Third place: Portugal
- Fourth place: Chile

Tournament statistics
- Matches played: 48
- Goals scored: 408 (8.5 per match)
- Top scorer(s): (Brazil) Cláudio Filho "Cacau" (15)
- Best player(s): (Spain) Pedro Gil

The 2013 FIRS Men's Roller Hockey World Cup was the 41st edition of the FIRS Roller Hockey World Cup. It was held in Luanda and Namibe (today Moçâmedes), Angola from 20 to 28 September 2013. This is the first Roller Hockey World Cup organized in Africa.

== Venues ==
Luanda and Namibe were the host cities of the tournament.

== Matches ==
All times are West Africa Time (UTC+1).

== Qualification ==
The teams to play the World Cup are the first thirteen countries at the last World Cup, and the first three countries qualified at last B World Cup. The group arrangement is already defined.

=== Group stage ===
==== Group A ====
Team	Pld	W	D	L	GF	GA	GD	Pts
Spain	3	3	0	0	25	4	+21	9
Brazil	3	2	0	1	16	7	+9	6
Switzerland	3	1	0	2	5	13	−8	3
Austria	3	0	0	3	0	22	−22	0

22 September 2013
17:45

Austria	0–9	Brazil
		0–1 Cláudio Filho "Cacau" 1st Hf; 0–2 Jurandir da Silva "Didi" GP 1st Hf; 0–3 "Cacau" 1st Hf; 0–4 "Didi" 1st Hf; 0–5 "Cacau" 1' 2nd Hf; 0–6 Cláudio Filho ""Cacau"" LD 2' 2nd Hf; 0–7 Jurandir da Silva ""Didi"" 8' 2nd Hf; 0–8 "Cacau" 9' 2nd Hf; 0–9 Diego Dias "Dieguinho" 18' 2nd Hf

Pav. Luanda

22 September 2013
19:30

Spain	9–1	Switzerland
1–0 Marc Gual 2' 1st Hf; 2–0 Josep ""Jepi"" Selva 7' 2nd Hf; 3–0 Toni Perez 12' 2nd Hf; 4–0 Toni Perez 16' 2nd Hf; 5–0 Jordi Bargalló 17' 2nd Hf; 6–0 Jordi Adroher 19' 2nd Hf; 7–1 Jordi Adroher 22' 2nd Hf; 8–1 Jordi Bargallo 23' 2nd Hf; 9–1 Jordi Adroher 23' 2nd Hf		1–6 Valerian von Daniken 21' 2nd Hf

Pav. Luanda

23 September 2013
15:00

Switzerland	2–4	Brazil
1–4 Kissling GP; 2–4 Kissling		0–1 Didi Gp; 0–2 Cacau; 0–3 Cacau; 0–4 Didi

Pav. Luanda

23 September 2013
16:45

Austria	0–11	Spain
		Jepi Selva (3); Perez (2); Gual (2); Gil (1); Bargallò (1); Torner (1); Barroso (1)

Pav. Luanda

24 September 2013
17:45

Switzerland	2–0	Austria
1–0 Marzio Vanina 1st Hf; 2–0 Pascal Kissling 2nd Hf

Pav. Luanda

24 September 2013
19:30

Spain	5–3	Brazil
1–0 Marc Gual 3' 1st Hf; 2–2 Jordi Adroher GP 16' 1st Hf; 3–3 Pedro Gil 13' 2nd Hf; 4–3 Pedro Gil 14' 2nd Hf; 5–3 Pedro Gil 14' 2nd Hf		1–1 Jurandir da Silva "Didi" GP 11' 2nd Hf; 1–2 Cláudio Filho "Cacau" 14' 2nd Hf; 2–3 Diego Dias "Dieguinho" 2nd Hf

Pav. Luanda

==== Group B ====
Team	Pld	W	D	L	GF	GA	GD	Pts
Argentina	3	3	0	0	17	3	+14	9
France	3	2	0	1	15	3	+12	6
Germany	3	1	0	2	12	7	+5	3
Uruguay	3	0	0	3	1	32	−31	0

22 September 2013
16:45

Germany	10–1	Uruguay
1–0 Felix Bender 4' 1st Hf; 2–0 Sérgio Pereira 4' 1st Hf; 3–0 Jorge Fonseca 6' 1st Hf; 4–0 Lucas Karschau 6' 1st Hf; 5–0 Yannick Peinke 10' 1st Hf; 6–0 ?????? 2nd Hf; 7–0 Sérgio Pereira 9' 2nd Hf; 8–1 Kai Milewski 13' 2nd Hf; 9–1 ?????? PWP 4x3 18' 2nd Hf; 10–1 Jonas Pink 19'21" 2nd Hf		7–1 Mateo Scarpita 10' 2nd Hf

Pav. Namibe

22 September 2013
18:30

France	1–3	Argentina
1–2 Wilfried Roux 2nd Hf		0–1 Mario Rodriguez 1st Hf; 0–2 Carlos Nicolia 1st Hf; 1–3 Carlos "Carlitos" Lopez 2nd Hf

Pav. Namibe

23 September 2013
15:00

Argentina	5–2	Germany
E. Garcia (2); Lopez; Gimenez; Pascual		Peinke; Paczia

Pav. Namibe

23 September 2013
16:45

Uruguay	0–13	France
		Weber(3); Nedder(2); Roux(2); Cirilo Garcia(2); David(2); Le Roux (1); Morales (1)

Pav. Namibe

24 September 2013
15:00

France	1–0	Germany
1–0 Anthony Weber 1st Hf

Pav. Namibe

24 September 2013
16:45

Argentina	8–0	Uruguay
1–0 Mario Rodriguez 1st Hf; 2–0 Matías Pascual 1st Hf; 3–0 Matías Pascual 1st Hf; 4–0 Carlos "Carlitos" Lopez 2nd Hf; 5–0 Dario Gimenez 2nd Hf; 6–0 Matias Platero 2nd Hf; 7–0 Emanuel Garcia 2nd Hf; 8–0 Dario Gimenez 2nd Hf

Pav. Namibe

==== Group C ====
Team	Pld	W	D	L	GF	GA	GD	Pts
Portugal	3	3	0	0	31	6	+25	9
Chile	3	2	0	1	14	9	+5	6
Angola	3	1	0	2	10	10	0	3
South Africa	3	0	0	3	7	37	−30	0

20 September 2013
20:00

Angola	8–2	South Africa
0–1 Anacleto Silva "Kirro" 4' 1st Hf; 0–2 João Pinto "Mustang" 5' 1st Hf; 0–3 João Pinto "Mustang" 9' 1st Hf; 0–4 Humberto Mendes "Big" 13' 1st Hf; 0–5 Martin Payero 17' 1st Hf; 1–6 João Vieira "JoHe" LD 7' 2nd Hf; 1–7 Martin Payero 11' 2nd Hf; 2–8 João Vieira "JoHe" GP 18' 2nd Hf		1–5 Adilson Correia 6' 2nd Hf; 2–7 Michael Guerra 15' 2nd Hf

Pav. Luanda

22 September 2013
21:15

Portugal	5–3	Chile
1–0 Luís Viana "Zorro" 18' 1st Hf; 2–1 Luís Viana "Zorro" GP 0'31 2nd Hf; 3–1 Luís Viana "Zorro" GP 4' 2nd Hf; 4–1 D. Rafael "Chiquinho" 4' 2nd Hf; 5–2 João Rodrigues 6' 2nd Hf		1–1 Nicolás Fernandez GP 19'45 1st Hf; 4–2 Nicolás Fernandez FS 10th Flt 5' 2nd Hf; 5–3 Nicolás Carmona GP 16' 2nd Hf

Pav. Luanda

23 September 2013
18:30

South Africa	2–21	Portugal
1–6 Justín da Costa 1st Hf; 2–14 Leandro Araújo 2nd Hf		0–1 Jorge Silva 1st Hf; 0–2 Jorge Silva 1st Hf; 0–3 Ricardo Barreiros 1st Hf; 0–4 Gonçalo Alves 1st Hf; 0–5 João Rodrigues 1st Hf; 0–6 João Rodrigues 1st Hf; 1–7 João Rodrigues 1st Hf; 1–8 João Rodrigues 1st Hf; 1–9 Diogo Rafael 2nd Hf; 1–10 Jorge Silva 2nd Hf; 1–11 Jorge Silva 2nd Hf; 1–12 Ricardo Barreiros 2nd Hf; 1–13 Jorge Silva 2nd Hf; 1–14 Jorge Silva 2nd Hf; 2–15 Jorge Silva 2nd Hf; 2–16 Luis Viana 2nd Hf; 2–17 Luis Viana 2nd Hf; 2–18 Helder Nunes LD 2nd Hf; 2–19 Luis Viana 2nd Hf; 2–20 Luis Viana 2nd Hf; 2–21 João Rodrigues 2nd Hf

Pav. Luanda

23 September 2013
20:30

Chile	1–1 (a.e.t.)	Angola
1–1 Filipe Castro 2nd Hf		0–1 João Veira "Johe" 1st Hf
Penalties
Juan Dias (penalty missed); 2–1 Filipe Castro (penalty scored); 3–1 Fernandes (penalty scored)	2–0	(penalty missed) João Vieira "Johe"; (penalty missed) André Centeno; (penalty missed) Big; (penalty missed) Martin Payero

Pav. Luanda

24 September 2013
16:00

South Africa	3–10	Chile

Pav. Luanda

24 September 2013

Angola	1–5	Portugal
1–2 Martin Payero 18' 1st Hf		0–1 Ricardo Barreiros 3' 1st Hf; 0–2 Ricardo Barreiros 6' 1st Hf; 1–3 Diogo Rafael "Chiquinho" 5' 2nd Hf; 1–4 Hélder Nunes 10' 2nd Hf; 1–5 Luís Viana "Zorro" LD 10ªF 19'35" 2nd Hf

Pav. Luanda

==== Group D ====
Team	Pld	W	D	L	GF	GA	GD	Pts
Italy	3	3	0	0	19	4	+15	9
Mozambique	3	2	0	1	10	7	+3	6
United States	3	1	0	2	9	20	−11	3
Colombia	3	0	0	3	10	17	−7	0

22 September 2013
15:00

United States	4–4 (a.e.t.)	Colombia
1–1 Shaun Schmelcher 6' 1st Hf; 2–1 Shane Enlow 9' 1st Hf; 3–3 Dylan Sordahl 19' 1st Hf; 4–4 Shaun Schmelcher 19'32" 2nd HF		0–1 Daniel Restrepo 2' 1st Hf; 2–2 Jonathan Orozco 14' 1st Hf; 2–3 Camilo Trujillo 16' 1st Hf; 3–4 Esteban Campo 3' 2nd Hf
Penalties
5–4 Josh Englund (penalty scored); Nic Robinson (penalty missed); Shaun Schmelcher (penalty missed); Lucas Thompson (penalty missed); 6–5 Dylan Sordahl (penalty scored) ----- sudden death ----- 7–6 Josh Englund (penalty scored)	3–2	(penalty missed) Camilo Trujillo; (penalty missed) Esteban Campo; (penalty scored) 5–5 Daniel Restrepo; (penalty missed) José Naranjo; (penalty scored) 6–6 Raúl Raigosa ----- sudden death ----- (penalty missed) Raúl Raigosa

Pav. Namibe

22 September 2013
20:15

Italy	4–1	Mozambique
1–0 Miguel Nicolas 10' 1st Hf; 2–0 Gaston de Oro 5' 2nd Hf		2–1 Nuno Araújo 11' 2nd Hf

Pav. Namibe

23 September 2013
18:30

Mozambique	4–2	United States
1–1 Bruno Pinto "Serodio"; 2–1 Ivan Esculudes GP; 3–1 Bruno Pinto; 4–1 Ivan Esculudes GP		0–1 Sordhal; 4–2 Sordhal

Pav. Namibe

23 September 2013
20:15

Colombia	3–5	Italy
Hincapie (1); Acosta (1); Trujillo (1)		Cocco (2); Gaston D´Oro LD (1); Nicoletti (1); Frederico Ambrosio LD(1)

Pav. Namibe

24 September 2013
18:30

Colombia	1–5	Mozambique
1–2 Camilo Trujillo 1st Hf		0–1 Nuno Araújo 1st Hf; 0–2 Mário "Marinho" Rodrigues GP 1st Hf; 1–3 Nuno Araújo LD 10ªF 16' 1st Hf; 1–4 Mário "Marinho" Rodrigues 19'22" 2nd Hf; 1–5 Mário "Marinho" Rodrigues 19'34" 2nd Hf

Pav. Namibe

24 September 2013
20:15

United States	0–10	Italy
		0–1 Diego Nicoletti 2' 1st Hf; 0–2 Federico Ambrosio 1st Hf; 0–3 Federico Ambrosio 12' 1st Hf; 0–4 Gaston de Oro LD 16' 1st Hf; 0–5 Gaston de Oro 17' 1st Hf; 0–6 Mattia Cocco 18' 1st Hf; 0–7 Sergio Festa 6' 2nd Hf; 0–8 Mattia Cocco 11' 2nd Hf; 0–9 Domenico Iluzzi 14' 2nd Hf; 0–10 Miguel Nicolas 19'59" 2nd Hf

Pav. Namibe

== Knockout stage ==
=== Championship ===
Quarter-finals
26 September – Luanda
Spain	5
France	3
26 September – Luanda
Italy	1 (1 et)
Chile	1 (2 et)
26 September – Luanda
Argentina	9
Brazil	5
26 September – Luanda
Portugal	6
Mozambique	0

Semi-finals
27 September – Luanda
Spain	7
Chile	0
27 September – Luanda
Argentina	1
Portugal	0

Final
28 September – Luanda
Spain	4
Argentina	3
Third place
28 September – Luanda
Chile	3
Portugal	10

==== Quarter-finals ====
26 September 2013
15:15

Argentina	9–5	Brazil
1–2 Carlos Nicolia 1st Hf; 2–2 Emanuel Garcia 1st Hf; 3–3 Emanuel Garcia LD 16' 1st Hf; 4–3 Matias Platero 18' 1st Hf; 5–3 Emanuel Garcia 19' 1st Hf; 6–5 Carlos Lopez "Carlitos" 10' 2nd Hf; 7–5 Carlos Lopez "Carlitos" 10' 2nd Hf; 8–5 Emanuel Garcia LD 14' 2nd Hf; 9–5 Matias Pascual 17' 2nd Hf		0–1 Cláudio Filho "Cacau" 1st Hf; 0–2 Jurandir da Silva "Didi" 1st Hf; 2–3 Cláudio Filho "Cacau" 8' 1st Hf; 5–4 Bruno Matos 2' 2nd Hf; 5–5 Cláudio Filho "Cacau" 8' 2nd Hf

Pav. Luanda
26 September 2013
17:15

Spain	5–3	France
1–0 Marc Gual GP 3' 1st Hf; 2–0 Jordi Adroher 13' 1st Hf; 3–0 Jordi Bargallo 16' 1st Hf; 4–0 Toni Perez 2' 2nd Hf; 5–2 Jordi Bargallo 13' 2nd Hf		4–1 Florent David GP 4' 2nd Hf; 4–2 Wilfred Roux 11' 2nd Hf; 5–3 Wilfred Roux 15' 2nd Hf

Pav. Luanda
26 September 2013
15:15

Italy	1–1 (1–2) (a.e.t.)	Chile
1–1 Diego Nicoletti LD 2nd Hf		0–1 Nicolas Carmona LD 2nd Hf; 2–1 Fernandez 2nd Hf e.t.

Pav. Luanda
26 September 2013
15:15

Portugal	6–0	Mozambique
1–0 Valter Neves 3' 1st Hf; 2–0 Diogo Rafael "Chiquinho" 9' 1st Hf; 3–0 Jorge Silva 13' 1st Hf; 4–0 João Rodrigues 18' 1st Hf; 5–0 Jorge Silva 17' 2nd Hf; 6–0 Gonçalo Alves 18' 2nd Hf

Pav. Luanda

==== Semi-finals ====
27 September 2013
19:15

Spain	7–0	Chile
1–0 Jordi Adroher 13' 1st Hf; 2–0 Jordi Bargalló 13' 1st Hf; 3–0 Pedro Gil LD 15' 1st Hf; 4–0 Toni Perez 6' 2nd Hf; 5–0 Marc Gual 7' 2nd Hf; 6–0 Josep "Jepi" Selva 17' 2nd Hf; 7–0 Enric Torner GP 17' 2nd Hf

Pav. Luanda
27 September 2013
21:15

Argentina	1–0 (a.e.t.)	Portugal
0–1 Carlos Nicolía 3' 1s Hf E.T.golden goal

Pav. Luanda

==== 3rd–4th place ====
28 September 2013
19:15

Chile	3–10	Portugal
1–6 Felipe Castro 5' 2nd Hf; 7–2 Nicolas Fernández 6' 2nd Hf; 7–3 Nicolas Fernández 17' 2nd Hf		1–0 Ricardo Barreiros 3' 1st Hf; 2–0 Gonçalo Alves 11' 1st Hf; 3–0 Jorge Silva 13' 1st Hf; 4–0 Gonçalo Alves 14' 1st Hf; 5–0 Jorge Silva 19' 1st Hf; 6–0 Jorge Silva 4' 2nd Hf; 7–1 Ricardo Barreiros 6' 2nd Hf; 8–3 Diogo Rafael 18' 2nd Hf; 9–3 Gonçalo Alves 18' 2nd Hf; 10–3 Gonçalo Alves 18' 2nd Hf

Pav. Luanda

==== Final ====
28 September 2013
21:15

Spain	4–3	Argentina
1–0 Jordi Adroher 3' 1st Hf; 2–0 Jordi Bargalló 10' 1st Hf; 3–0 Marc Gual 4' 2nd Hf; 4–3 Pedro Gil 17' 2nd Hf		3–1 Carlos Nicolia 12' 2nd Hf; 3–2 Matias Platero 16' 2nd Hf; 3–3 Carlos Nicolia 17' 2nd Hf

Pav. Luanda

=== 5th–8th playoff ===
Semi-finals
27 September – Luanda
France	5
Italy	6
27 September – Luanda
Brazil	7
Mozambique	5

5th place
28 September – Luanda
Italy	4
Brazil	1
7th place
28 September – Luanda
France	4
Mozambique	5

=== 9th–16th playoff ===
Quarter-finals
26 September – Namibe
Switzerland	16
Uruguay	2
26 September – Namibe
United States	4
South Africa	6
26 September – Namibe
Germany	12
Austria	3
26 September – Namibe
Angola	6
Colombia	3

Semi finals
27 September – Luanda
Switzerland	4
South Africa	2
27 September – Luanda
Germany	1
Angola	4

Ninth place
28 September – Luanda
Switzerland	1
Angola	6
Eleventh place
28 September – Luanda
South Africa	3
Germany	6

=== 13th–16th playoff ===
Semi-finals
27 September – Luanda
Uruguay	3
United States	6
27 September – Luanda
Austria	3
Colombia	7

13th place
28 September – Luanda
United States	1
Colombia	6
15th place
28 September – Luanda
Uruguay	1
Austria	5

== Final standing ==
Rank	Team
1st place, gold medalist(s)	Spain
2nd place, silver medalist(s)	Argentina
3rd place, bronze medalist(s)	Portugal
4	Chile
5	Italy
6	Brazil
7	Mozambique
8	France
9	Angola
10	Switzerland
11	Germany
12	South Africa
13	Colombia
14	United States
15	Austria
16	Uruguay

2013 FIRS Roller Hockey World Championship
SPAIN
16th title
