= 1978 Roller Hockey World Cup =

Roller Hockey Men's World Championships

Tournament details
- Host country: Argentina
- Dates: 1 October 1978– 12 October 1978
- Teams: 12 (from 6 confederations)
- Venue(s): 1 (in 1 host city)

Final positions
- Champions: Argentina (1st title)
- Runners-up: Spain
- Third place: Portugal
- Fourth place: West Germany

Tournament statistics
- Matches played: 66
- Goals scored: 607 (9.2 per match)

The 1978 Roller Hockey World Cup was the twenty-third roller hockey world cup, organized by the Fédération Internationale de Roller Sports. It was contested by 12 national teams (5 from Europe, 3 from South America, 1 from North America, 1 from Africa, 1 from Asia and 1 from Oceania). All the games were played in the Estadio Aldo Cantoni, in the city of San Juan, in Argentina, the chosen city to host the World Cup.

== Venue ==
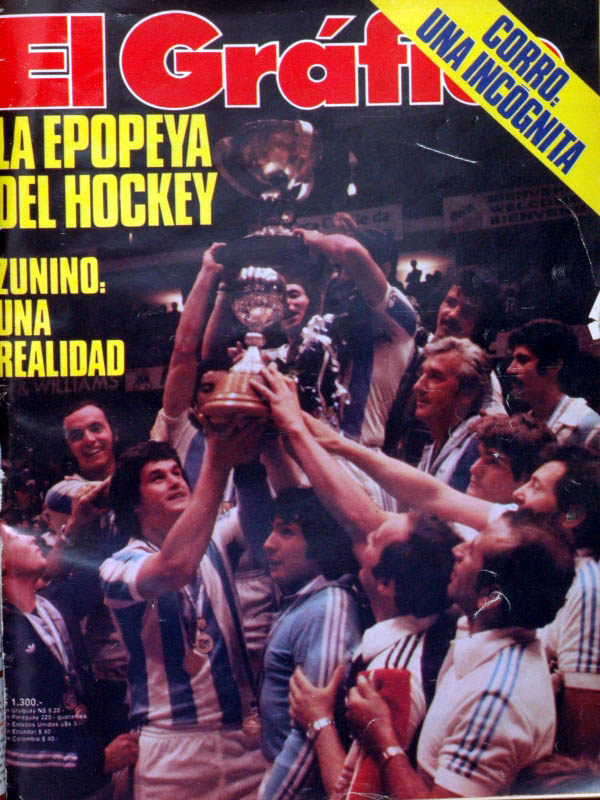
The Argentina squad celebrating with the Cup

San Juan	San Juan (Argentina)
Estadio Aldo Cantoni	San Juan (Argentina)
Capacity: 8,000	San Juan (Argentina)

== Results ==
Team	ESP	BRA	ARG	BEL	POR	MOZ	CHI	AUS	JPN	FRG	USA	ITA
Spain												
Brazil	2–5											
Argentina	3–1	2–0										
Belgium	1–4	1–1	1–11									
Portugal	2–3	2–3	2–2	10–3								
Mozambique	2–15	1–7	1–15	3–6	0–19							
Chile	0–9	5–3	1–3	6–2	4–5	6–2						
Australia	2–10	0–6	0–10	5–5	1–16	5–3	3–10					
Japan	0–23	3–11	0–18	3–13	0–16	1–8	0–13	1–4				
West Germany	2–3	6–3	2–3	5–3	3–5	5–1	3–8	9–1	15–3			
United States	3–7	6–2	0–8	3–2	2–9	4–3	5–3	9–4	16–1	3–7		
Italy	3–8	0–1	1–3	2–4	1–3	9–1	3–2	6–1	9–1	2–2	3–1	

== Standings ==
Team	Pld	W	D	L	GF	GA	GD	Pts
(gold) Argentina (C)	11	10	1	0	78	9	+69	21
(silver) Spain	11	10	0	1	88	20	+68	20
(bronze) Portugal	11	8	1	2	89	22	+67	17
West Germany	11	6	1	4	59	35	+24	13
United States	11	6	0	5	52	49	+3	12
Chile	11	6	0	5	58	38	+20	12
Brazil	11	5	1	5	39	27	+12	11
Italy	11	5	1	5	39	31	+8	11
Belgium	11	3	2	6	41	53	−12	8
Australia	11	2	1	8	26	85	−59	5
Mozambique	11	1	0	10	25	92	−67	2
Japan	11	0	0	11	13	146	−133	0

(C) 1978 World Champion

== See also ==
- FIRS Roller Hockey World Cup
