= 1991 Roller Hockey World Cup =

Roller Hockey Men's A World Championships

Tournament details
- Host country: Portugal
- Teams: 12 (from 5 confederations)
- Venue(s): 2 (in 2 host cities)

Final positions
- Champions: Portugal (13th title)
- Runners-up: Netherlands
- Third place: Argentina
- Fourth place: Brazil

Tournament statistics
- Matches played: 48
- Goals scored: 327 (6.81 per match)

The 1991 Roller Hockey World Cup was the thirtieth roller hockey world cup, organized by the Fédération Internationale de Roller Sports. It was contested by 12 national teams (6 from Europe, 3 from South America, 1 from North America, 1 from Africa and 1 from Oceania). The group A was played in the city of Braga and all the other games were played in Porto, in the north of Portugal, the chosen city to host the World Cup.

Portugal won his 13th title, defeating surprise finalists, the Netherlands, by 7-0, in the final. It was the first title for Portugal since 1982. Because of its importance, the final was attended by the Portuguese President, Mário Soares.

== Group stage ==
=== Group A ===
Team	GER	ANG	ARG	ESP	ITA	SWI
Germany						
Angola	2–4					
Argentina	6–0	2–2				
Spain	10–3	8–1	2–1			
Italy	9–2	4–0	1–0	0–4		
Switzerland	1–3	3–2	1–5	0–10	1–11	

- All the games played in Braga

Team	Pld	W	D	L	GF	GA	GD	Pts	Qualification
Spain	5	5	0	0	24	5	+19	10	Advancing to quarter-finals
Italy	5	4	0	1	25	7	+18	8	Advancing to quarter-finals
Argentina	5	2	1	2	14	6	+8	5	Advancing to quarter-finals
Germany	5	2	0	3	12	28	−16	4	Advancing to quarter-finals
Switzerland	5	1	0	4	6	21	−15	2	
Angola	5	0	1	4	7	21	−14	1	

=== Group B ===
Team	AUS	BRA	CHI	USA	NED	POR
Australia						
Brazil	8–0					
Chile	6–2	0–6				
United States	7–2	4–0	5–2			
Netherlands	4–1	3–3	2–0	4–6		
Portugal	11–2	2–1	11–0	8–1	6–1	

Team	Pld	W	D	L	GF	GA	GD	Pts	Qualification
Portugal	5	5	0	0	38	5	+33	10	Advancing to quarter-finals
United States	5	4	0	1	23	16	+7	8	Advancing to quarter-finals
Brazil	5	2	1	2	18	9	+9	5	Advancing to quarter-finals
Netherlands	5	2	1	2	14	16	−2	5	Advancing to quarter-finals
Chile	5	1	0	4	8	26	−18	2	
Australia	5	0	0	5	7	36	−29	0	

== Final phase ==
=== 9th to 12th play-off ===
Team	SWI	CHI	ANG	AUS
Switzerland				
Chile	1–4			
Angola	1–3	3–0		
Australia	2–6	3–11	3–3	

Team	Pld	W	D	L	GF	GA	GD	Pts
Switzerland	3	3	0	0	13	4	+9	6
Angola	3	1	1	1	7	6	+1	3
Chile	3	1	0	2	12	10	+2	2
Australia	3	0	1	2	8	20	−12	1

=== Final round ===
Quarter-finals
Porto
Italy	5
Brazil	6
Porto
Germany	0
Portugal	8
Porto
Spain	4
Netherlands	5
Porto
Argentina (pso)	5 (3)
United States	5 (1)

Semi-finals
Porto
Brazil	1
Portugal	5
Porto
Netherlands (pso)	1 (3)
Argentina	1 (1)

Final
Porto
(gold) Portugal	7
(silver) Netherlands	0
Third place
Porto
Brazil	0
(bronze) Argentina	6

Fifth–eighth places
Porto
Italy	9
Germany	4
Porto
Spain	3
United States	2

Fifth place
Porto
Italy	4
Spain	3
Seventh place
Porto
Germany	4 (0)
United States (pso)	4 (1)

== Standings ==
	Team
1st place, gold medalist(s)	Portugal
2nd place, silver medalist(s)	Netherlands
3rd place, bronze medalist(s)	Argentina
4th	Brazil
5th	Italy
6th	Spain
7th	United States
8th	Germany
9th	Switzerland
10th	Angola
11th	Chile
12th	Australia

== See also ==
- FIRS Roller Hockey World Cup
