= 1986 Roller Hockey World Cup =

Roller Hockey A Men's World Championships

Tournament details
- Host country: Brazil
- Dates: 13 September 1986– 21 September 1986
- Teams: 10 (from 4 confederations)
- Venue(s): 1 (in 1 host city)

Final positions
- Champions: Italy (2nd title)
- Runners-up: Spain
- Third place: Portugal
- Fourth place: Argentina

Tournament statistics
- Matches played: 45
- Goals scored: 346 (7.69 per match)

The 1986 Roller Hockey World Cup was the twenty-seventh roller hockey world cup, organized by the Fédération Internationale de Roller Sports. It was contested by 10 national teams (5 from Europe, 3 from South America, 1 from North America and 1 from Africa). All the games were played in the city of Sertãozinho, in Brazil, the chosen city to host the World Cup.

== Results ==
Team	FRA	POR	CHI	BRA	ESP	USA	ARG	ANG	ITA	ENG
France										
Portugal	8–5									
Chile	8–3	0–13								
Brazil	4–1	5–5	6–2							
Spain	13–2	5–3	6–2	9–2						
United States	7–2	1–6	2–1	3–3	0–3					
Argentina	10–1	1–5	8–2	5–1	4–6	2–2				
Angola	5–2	2–7	3–1	0–1	0–4	1–3	0–5			
Italy	9–0	8–3	10–3	10–5	2–1	2–0	5–2	5–0		
England	3–1	2–9	2–1	2–8	4–9	1–2	0–7	2–4	1–12	

== Standings ==
Team	Pld	W	D	L	GF	GA	GD	Pts
(gold) Italy (C)	9	9	0	0	63	15	+48	18
(silver) Spain	9	8	0	1	56	19	+37	16
(bronze) Portugal	9	6	1	2	59	29	+30	13
Argentina	9	5	1	3	44	21	+23	11
United States	9	4	2	3	20	21	−1	10
Brazil	9	4	2	3	35	37	−2	10
Angola	9	3	0	6	15	30	−15	6
England	9	2	0	7	17	53	−36	4
Chile	9	1	0	8	20	53	−33	2
France	9	0	0	9	17	68	−51	0

(C) 1986 World Champion

== See also ==
- FIRS Roller Hockey World Cup
