= 1972 Roller Hockey World Cup =

Roller Hockey Men's World Championships

Tournament details
- Host country: Spain
- Dates: 26 July 1972– 6 August 1972
- Teams: 12 (from 5 confederations)
- Venue(s): 1 (in 1 host city)

Final positions
- Champions: Spain (7th title)
- Runners-up: Portugal
- Third place: Argentina
- Fourth place: West Germany

Tournament statistics
- Matches played: 66
- Goals scored: 568 (8.61 per match)

The 1972 Roller Hockey World Cup was the twentieth roller hockey world cup, organized by the Fédération Internationale de Roller Sports. It was contested by 12 national teams (6 from Europe, 2 from South America, 2 from Oceania, 1 from North America and 1 from Asia). All the games were played in the city of A Coruña, in Spain, the chosen city to host the World Cup.

== Results ==
Team	FRG	NED	JPN	NZL	AUS	USA	BEL	CHI	POR	ESP	ARG	ITA
West Germany												
Netherlands	2–4											
Japan	0–12	1–10										
New Zealand	2–12	2–11	3–2									
Australia	1–7	3–10	5–1	3–2								
United States	4–6	3–8	9–2	2–2	5–1							
Belgium	3–12	3–5	9–2	9–2	5–4	1–5						
Chile	4–8	0–2	3–2	11–2	3–1	4–1	10–3					
Portugal	3–2	10–1	16–1	7–3	21–0	4–2	4–1	7–2				
Spain	3–0	8–1	14–0	20–0	18–3	16–1	15–2	10–3	4–0			
Argentina	2–1	2–5	5–0	6–1	10–3	5–0	3–3	9–0	2–0	0–2		
Italy	0–5	3–2	5–0	8–0	7–2	4–3	1–1	7–3	0–3	1–2	1–1	

== Standings ==
Team	Pld	W	D	L	GF	GA	GD	Pts
(gold) Spain (C)	11	11	0	0	112	11	+101	22
(silver) Portugal	11	9	0	2	75	18	+57	18
(bronze) Argentina	11	7	2	2	45	15	+30	16
West Germany	11	8	0	3	69	24	+45	16
Italy	11	6	2	3	37	22	+15	14
Netherlands	11	7	0	4	57	39	+18	14
Chile	11	5	0	6	43	52	−9	10
Belgium	11	3	2	6	40	63	−23	8
United States	11	3	1	7	35	53	−18	7
Australia	11	2	0	9	26	89	−63	4
New Zealand	11	1	1	9	18	91	−73	3
Japan	11	0	0	11	11	91	−80	0

(C) 1972 World Champion

== See also ==
- FIRS Roller Hockey World Cup
