= 1970 Roller Hockey World Cup =

Roller Hockey Men's World Championships

Tournament details
- Host country: Argentina
- Dates: 22 April 1970– 3 May 1970
- Teams: 11 (from 4 confederations)
- Venue(s): 1 (in 1 host city)

Final positions
- Champions: Spain (6th title)
- Runners-up: Portugal
- Third place: Italy
- Fourth place: Argentina

Tournament statistics
- Matches played: 55
- Goals scored: 545 (9.91 per match)

The 1970 Roller Hockey World Cup was the nineteenth roller hockey world cup, organized by the Fédération Internationale de Roller Sports. It was contested by 11 national teams (6 from Europe, 3 from South America, 1 from North America and 1 from Asia). All the games were played in the city of San Juan, in Argentina, the chosen city to host the World Cup.

== Venue ==
| San Juan | San Juan (Argentina) |
| Estadio Aldo Cantoni | San Juan (Argentina) |
| Capacity: 8,000 | San Juan (Argentina) |

== Results ==
| Team | CHI | NED | FRG | POR | FRA | ARG | JPN | ITA | USA | BRA | ESP |
|---|---|---|---|---|---|---|---|---|---|---|---|
| Chile | | | | | | | | | | | |
| Netherlands | 7–6 | | | | | | | | | | |
| West Germany | 4–8 | 5–3 | | | | | | | | | |
| Portugal | 5–3 | 12–2 | 3–1 | | | | | | | | |
| France | 2–7 | 6–5 | 8–7 | 2–6 | | | | | | | |
| Argentina | 2–4 | 5–2 | 2–1 | 2–2 | 13–1 | | | | | | |
| Japan | 2–9 | 2–7 | 4–8 | 0–14 | 3–10 | 1–18 | | | | | |
| Italy | 3–2 | 7–4 | 4–3 | 2–5 | 6–4 | 2–2 | 10–3 | | | | |
| United States | 1–9 | 1–8 | 4–6 | 3–7 | 2–8 | 2–5 | 9–8 | 1–4 | | | |
| Brazil | 1–1 | 12–0 | 5–3 | 6–7 | 9–7 | 1–4 | 13–1 | 2–3 | 7–3 | | |
| Spain | 7–1 | 10–3 | 7–2 | 3–2 | 13–2 | 6–2 | 7–1 | 7–0 | 8–0 | 12–6 | |

== Standings ==
| Team | Pld | W | D | L | GF | GA | GD | Pts |
|---|---|---|---|---|---|---|---|---|
| (gold) Spain (C) | 10 | 10 | 0 | 0 | 90 | 19 | +71 | 20 |
| (silver) Portugal | 10 | 8 | 1 | 1 | 63 | 24 | +39 | 17 |
| (bronze) Italy | 10 | 7 | 1 | 2 | 41 | 33 | +8 | 15 |
| Argentina | 10 | 6 | 2 | 2 | 55 | 22 | +33 | 14 |
| Brazil | 10 | 5 | 1 | 4 | 61 | 41 | +20 | 11 |
| France | 10 | 5 | 0 | 5 | 57 | 67 | −10 | 10 |
| Chile | 10 | 4 | 1 | 5 | 45 | 40 | +5 | 9 |
| West Germany | 10 | 3 | 0 | 7 | 41 | 48 | −7 | 6 |
| Netherlands | 10 | 3 | 0 | 7 | 41 | 66 | −25 | 6 |
| United States | 10 | 1 | 0 | 9 | 26 | 70 | −44 | 2 |
| Japan | 10 | 0 | 0 | 10 | 25 | 115 | −90 | 0 |

(C) 1970 World Champion

== See also ==
- FIRS Roller Hockey World Cup
