= 1997 Roller Hockey World Cup =

Roller Hockey Men's A World Championships

Tournament details
- Host country: Germany
- City: Wuppertal
- Teams: 12 (from 4 confederations)
- Venue(s): 1 (in 1 host city)

Final positions
- Champions: Italy (4th title)
- Runners-up: Argentina
- Third place: Spain
- Fourth place: Portugal

Tournament statistics
- Matches played: 48
- Goals scored: 380 (7.92 per match)

The 1997 Roller Hockey World Cup was the thirty-third roller hockey world cup, organized by the Fédération Internationale de Roller Sports. It was contested by 12 national teams (7 from Europe, 3 from South America, 1 from Africa and 1 from North America). The tournament was played in the city of Wuppertal, in Germany.

== Group stage ==
=== Group A ===
Team	Pld	W	D	L	GF	GA	GD	Pts	Qualification	ARG	ITA	ESP	ANG	FRA	NED
Argentina	5	4	1	0	36	7	+29	9	Advanced to quarter-finals		7–2	1–1	10–1	10–0	8–3
Italy	5	4	0	1	39	11	+28	8	Advanced to quarter-finals				15–1	6–1	11–0
Spain	5	3	1	1	31	8	+23	7	Advanced to quarter-finals		2–5		10–0	6–1	12–1
Angola	5	2	0	3	11	42	−31	4	Advanced to quarter-finals					4–3	5–4
France	5	1	0	4	11	29	−18	2							6–3
Netherlands	5	0	0	5	11	42	−31	0							

=== Group B ===
Team	Pld	W	D	L	GF	GA	GD	Pts	Qualification	POR	GER	BRA	SWI	USA	COL
Portugal	5	5	0	0	44	11	+33	10	Advanced to quarter-finals		6–1	3–2	4–2	17–2	14–4
Germany	5	4	0	1	18	16	+2	8	Advanced to quarter-finals					5–1	2–1
Brazil	5	2	1	2	24	19	+5	5	Advanced to quarter-finals		6–7		1–1	8–5	7–3
Switzerland	5	2	1	2	18	14	+4	5	Advanced to quarter-finals		2–3			6–4	7–2
United States	5	1	0	4	17	39	−22	2							5–3
Colombia	5	0	0	5	13	35	−22	0							

== Final phase ==
=== 9th to 12th play-off ===
Team	Pld	W	D	L	GF	GA	GD	Pts	FRA	USA	NED	COL
France	3	3	0	0	12	0	+12	6			7–0	
United States	3	2	0	1	8	7	+1	4	0–2		5–3	3–2
Netherlands	3	1	0	2	4	12	−8	2				
Colombia	3	0	0	3	2	7	−5	0	0–3		0–1	

=== Final round ===
Quarter-finals
Wuppertal
Argentina	5
Switzerland	2
Wuppertal
Spain	2
Germany	0
Wuppertal
Italy	7
Brazil	2
Wuppertal
Portugal	19
Angola	0

Semi-finals
Wuppertal
Argentina	4
Spain	3
Wuppertal
Italy	4
Portugal	2

Final
Wuppertal
(silver) Argentina	0
(gold) Italy	5
Third place
Wuppertal
(bronze) Spain	3
Portugal	1

Fifth–eighth places
Wuppertal
Switzerland	3
Germany	1
Wuppertal
Brazil	5
Angola	2

Fifth place
Wuppertal
Switzerland	2
Brazil	4
Seventh place
Wuppertal
Germany	4
Angola	1

== Standings ==
	Team
1st place, gold medalist(s)	Italy
2nd place, silver medalist(s)	Argentina
3rd place, bronze medalist(s)	Spain
4th	Portugal
5th	Brazil
6th	Switzerland
7th	Germany
8th	Angola
9th	France
10th	United States
11th	Netherlands
12th	Colombia

== See also ==
- FIRS Roller Hockey World Cup
