= 1974 Roller Hockey World Cup =

Roller Hockey Men's World Championships

Tournament details
- Host country: Portugal
- Dates: 21 July 1974– 29 July 1974
- Teams: 12 (from 4 confederations)
- Venue: 1 (in 1 host city)

Final positions
- Champions: Portugal (11th title)
- Runners-up: Spain
- Third place: Argentina
- Fourth place: West Germany

Tournament statistics
- Matches played: 66
- Goals scored: 504 (7.64 per match)

The 1974 Roller Hockey World Cup was the twenty-first roller hockey world cup, organized by the Fédération Internationale de Roller Sports. It was contested by 12 national teams (8 from Europe, 2 from South America, 1 from North America and 1 from Oceania). All the games were played in the city of Lisbon, in Portugal, the chosen city to host the World Cup.

== Results ==
Team	BEL	ARG	AUS	FRG	BRA	NED	SWI	ITA	FRA	ESP	USA	POR
Belgium												
Argentina	5–3											
Australia	2–7	0–9										
West Germany	9–3	1–1	3–0									
Brazil	6–3	2–4	6–2	8–5								
Netherlands	4–3	3–4	6–1	2–4	5–6							
Switzerland	3–5	3–4	4–4	1–7	0–3	2–1						
Italy	9–1	1–3	10–2	3–6	2–1	3–6	6–1					
France	6–3	1–7	8–0	3–6	2–3	2–7	4–4	4–1				
Spain	13–3	1–1	8–0	6–1	4–1	6–0	10–0	3–3	5–0			
United States	7–3	2–2	6–1	1–4	1–3	5–4	2–3	3–4	2–4	0–3		
Portugal	18–1	5–1	9–1	4–2	8–2	4–1	14–3	3–3	8–1	4–2	13–4	

== Standings ==
Team	Pld	W	D	L	GF	GA	GD	Pts
(gold) Portugal (C)	11	10	1	0	90	20	+70	21
(silver) Spain	11	8	2	1	60	13	+47	18
(bronze) Argentina	11	7	3	1	41	22	+19	17
West Germany	11	7	1	3	48	32	+16	15
Brazil	11	7	0	4	41	36	+5	14
Italy	11	5	2	4	45	33	+12	12
France	11	4	1	6	35	46	−11	9
Netherlands	11	4	0	7	39	40	−1	8
United States	11	3	1	7	33	44	−11	7
Switzerland	11	2	2	7	24	60	−36	6
Belgium	11	2	0	9	35	82	−47	4
Australia	11	0	1	10	13	76	−63	1

(C) 1974 World Champion

== See also ==
- FIRS Roller Hockey World Cup
