= 2011 FIRS Men's Roller Hockey World Cup =

2011 FIRS Roller Hockey World Cup

Tournament details
- Host country: Argentina
- Dates: 24 September - 1 October 2011
- Teams: 16 (from 5 confederations)
- Venue: San Juan (in 1 host city)

Final positions
- Champions: Spain (15th title)
- Runners-up: Argentina
- Third place: Portugal
- Fourth place: Mozambique

The 2011 FIRS Men's Roller Hockey World Cup was the 40th edition of the FIRS Roller Hockey World Cup. It was held in September 2011 in San Juan, Argentina. This was the fifth FIRS Roller Hockey World Cup organized in the province of San Juan.

It was initially announced that the tournament was to be held in Maputo, Mozambique and the city of San Juan, Argentina was designated the alternative host city. In July, 2010 the FIRS declared that San Juan, Argentina would take the place of Maputo as host city for the tournament.

== Qualification ==
One year before the World Cup, the B World Championship was disputed in Dornbirn, Austria, where three teams were qualified.

The other thirteen qualified National Teams are the top thirteen National Teams of the previous World Cup, played in Vigo, Spain.

== Venue ==
San Juan	San Juan (Argentina)
Estadio Aldo Cantoni	San Juan (Argentina)
Capacity: 8,000	San Juan (Argentina)

== Matches ==
All times are Argentina Time (UTC-3).

=== Group stage ===
==== Group A ====
Team	Pld	W	D	L	GF	GA	GD	Pts
Spain	3	3	0	0	27	2	+25	9
Chile	3	2	0	1	10	10	0	6
Switzerland	3	1	0	2	7	7	0	3
Netherlands	3	0	0	3	2	27	−25	0

24 September 2011

Spain	8 - 1	Chile

25 September 2011

Switzerland	6 - 0	Netherlands

26 September 2011

Spain	15 - 1	Netherlands

26 September 2011

Chile	3 - 1	Switzerland

27 September 2011

Chile	6 - 1	Netherlands

27 September 2011

Spain	4 - 0	Switzerland

==== Group B ====
Team	Pld	W	D	L	GF	GA	GD	Pts
Argentina	3	3	0	0	21	5	+16	9
Italy	3	2	0	1	19	8	+11	6
Germany	3	1	0	2	12	12	0	3
South Africa	3	0	0	3	3	30	−27	0

25 September 2011

South Africa	0 - 11	Italy

25 September 2011

Germany	2 - 4	Argentina

26 September 2011

Germany	1 - 6	Italy

26 September 2011

Argentina	10 - 1	South Africa

27 September 2011

Germany	9 - 2	South Africa

27 September 2011

Argentina	7 - 2	Italy

==== Group C ====
Team	Pld	W	D	L	GF	GA	GD	Pts
Portugal	3	3	0	0	31	6	+25	9
Mozambique	3	2	0	1	17	11	+6	6
Angola	3	1	0	2	12	13	−1	3
United States	3	0	0	3	5	35	−30	0

25 September 2011

Mozambique	10 - 1	United States

25 September 2011

Angola	2 - 6	Portugal

26 September 2011

United States	3 - 7	Angola

26 September 2011

Mozambique	3 - 7	Portugal

27 September 2011

United States	1 - 18	Portugal

27 September 2011

Mozambique	4 - 3	Angola

==== Group D ====
Team	Pld	W	D	L	GF	GA	GD	Pts
Brazil	3	3	0	0	24	5	+19	9
France	3	2	0	1	10	11	−1	6
Colombia	3	1	0	2	9	14	−5	3
England	3	0	0	3	4	17	−13	0

25 September 2011

England	1 - 5	Colombia

25 September 2011

France	1 - 8	Brazil

26 September 2011

Colombia	2 - 4	France

26 September 2011

England	2 - 7	Brazil

27 September 2011

Colombia	2 - 9	Brazil

27 September 2011

England	1 - 5	France

== Knockout stage ==
=== Championship ===
Quarter-finals
29 September – San Juan
Spain	5
Italy	2
29 September – San Juan
Brazil	6
Mozambique	9
29 September – San Juan
Argentina	12
Chile	3
29 September – San Juan
Portugal	6
France	3

Semi-finals
30 September – San Juan
Spain	4
Mozambique	3
30 September – San Juan
Argentina	4
Portugal	3

Final
1 October – San Juan
Spain	5
Argentina	4
Third place
1 October – San Juan
Portugal	9
Mozambique	2

=== 5th–8th playoff ===
Semi-finals
30 September – San Juan
France	3
Chile	4
30 September – San Juan
Brazil	1
Italy	6

Fifth place
1 October – San Juan
Chile	0
Italy	4
Seventh place
1 October – San Juan
France	5
Brazil	4

=== 9th–16th playoff ===
Quarter-finals
29 September – San Juan
Switzerland	3
South Africa	2
29 September – San Juan
Colombia	5
United States	2
29 September – San Juan
Germany	3
Netherlands	2
29 September – San Juan
Angola	7
England	1

Semi finals
30 September – San Juan
Switzerland	6
Colombia	0
30 September – San Juan
Germany	4
Angola	3

Ninth place
1 October – San Juan
Switzerland	4
Germany	3
Eleventh place
1 October – San Juan
Colombia	1
Angola	3

=== 13th–16th playoff ===
Semi-finals
30 September – San Juan
South Africa	9
United States	11
30 September – San Juan
Netherlands	4
England	3

Thirteenth place
1 October – San Juan
United States	5
Netherlands	0
Fifteenth place
1 October – San Juan
South Africa	4
England	7

== Final standing ==
Rank	Team
1st place, gold medalist(s)	Spain
2nd place, silver medalist(s)	Argentina
3rd place, bronze medalist(s)	Portugal
4	Mozambique
5	Italy
6	Chile
7	France
8	Brazil
9	Switzerland
10	Germany
11	Angola
12	Colombia
13	United States
14	Netherlands
15	England
16	South Africa

2011 FIRS Roller Hockey World Championship

15th title
