= Roller hockey at the 1981 World Games =

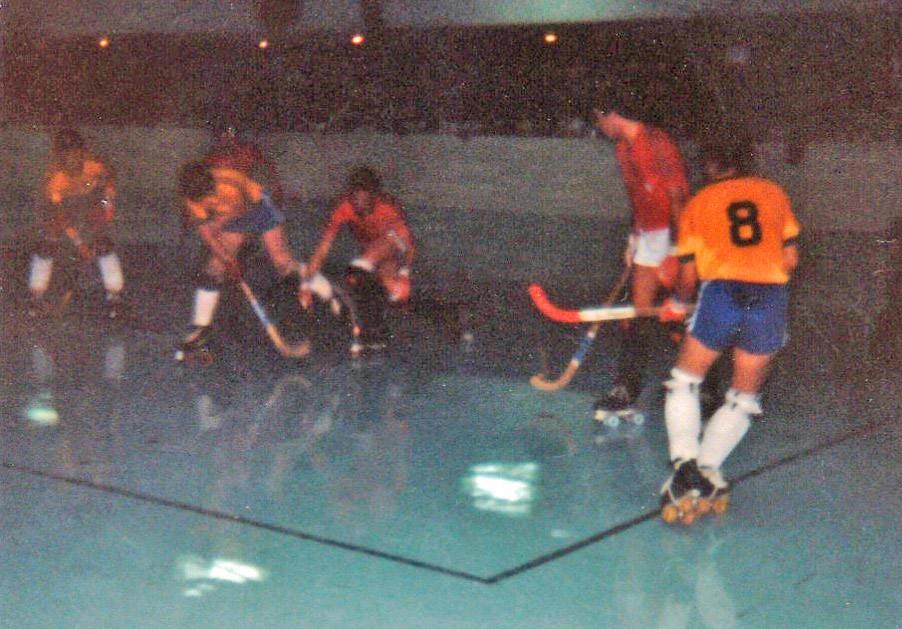
World Games I action in roller hockey

Roller hockey was one of the sports featured in World Games I. The 1981 Games were the first World Games, an international quadrennial multi-sport event, and were held in Santa Clara, California in the United States. Roller hockey or its more recent variant, inline hockey (since 2005) has appeared in all editions of the World Games to date, except 1997.

Six teams contested each other in pool play. The games were played July 27–July 31, 1981 at Cal Skate Roller Rink in Milpitas, California. Teams from Argentina, Brazil, Chile, Italy, Portugal, and the United States participated. Pereira Christiano of the Portuguese team observed, "I thought World Games might be another Olympiad. But I know the Olympiad, and World Games doesn't compare."

== Medalists ==
| Gold | Silver | Bronze |
|---|---|---|
| Portugal Jose Carlos; Gomes Da Costa; Pereira Christiano others......... | United States Dick Chado; Dave DeSoto; Gene Ferguson; Pat Ferguson; Johnny Raglin; Jimmy Trussell others...... | Argentina Aguero; Luz; Jose Martinazzo; Daniel Martinazzo others........ |

== Standing ==
| Team | W | L | T | GF | GA | Pts |
|---|---|---|---|---|---|---|
| Portugal | 3 | 0 | 2 | 16 | 8 | 8 |
| United States | 2 | 0 | 3 | 17 | 9 | 7 |
| Argentina | 2 | 1 | 2 | 19 | 11 | 6 |
| Italy | 3 | 2 | 0 | 19 | 18 | 6 |
| Brazil | 1 | 3 | 1 | 6 | 21 | 3 |
| Chile | 0 | 5 | 0 | 8 | 23 | 0 |

== Details ==
The six teams played one game each against all of the other teams during the five-day competition.

Monday, July, 27, 1981:

Argentina 5, Chile 2
Portugal 3, Brazil 1
United States 3, Italy 2

Tuesday, July 28, 1981:

Portugal 3, Argentina 3, tie
United States 7, Chile 0
Italy 6, Brazil 4

Wednesday, July 29, 1981:

Italy 4, Chile 3
Argentina 6, Brazil 2
United States 2, Portugal 2, tie

Thursday, July 30, 1981:

Italy 5, Argentina 4
United States 3, Brazil 3, tie
Portugal 3, Chile 0

Friday, July 31, 1981:

Brazil 4, Chile 3
United States 2, Argentina 2, tie
Portugal 5, Italy 2

Other known individual participants: BRA – Casado, Mauricio Duque, Guedes, Hequena, Newshander; CHI – Bendek, Munoz, Salvatierra; ITA – Colamaria, Giuseppe Marzella, Villani
