= 1995 Roller Hockey World Cup =

Roller Hockey Men's A World Championships

Tournament details
- Host country: Brazil
- City: Recife
- Teams: 12 (from 3 confederations)
- Venue(s): 1 (in 1 host city)

Final positions
- Champions: Argentina (3rd title)
- Runners-up: Portugal
- Third place: Spain
- Fourth place: Brazil

Tournament statistics
- Matches played: 48
- Goals scored: 372 (7.75 per match)

The 1995 Roller Hockey World Cup was the thirty-second roller hockey world cup, organized by the Fédération Internationale de Roller Sports. It was contested by 12 national teams (8 from Europe, 3 from South America and 1 from Africa). The tournament was played in the city of Recife, in Brazil.

== Group stage ==
=== Group A ===
Team	ANG	BRA	ARG	NED	POR	AND
Angola		2–3	1–6	4–3	4–10	4–1
Brazil			0–3	6–3	3–6	4–2
Argentina				18–1	2–3	13–2
Netherlands					2–9	3–2
Portugal						12–3
Andorra						

Team	Pld	W	D	L	GF	GA	GD	Pts	Qualification
Portugal	5	5	0	0	40	14	+26	10	Advanced to quarter-finals
Argentina	5	4	0	1	42	7	+35	8	Advanced to quarter-finals
Brazil	5	3	0	2	16	16	0	6	Advanced to quarter-finals
Angola	5	2	0	3	15	23	−8	4	Advanced to quarter-finals
Netherlands	5	1	0	4	12	39	−27	2	
Andorra	5	0	0	5	10	36	−26	0	

=== Group B ===
Team	ESP	FRA	ITA	GER	CHI	SUI
Spain		9–2	3–5	9–0	9–1	4–0
France			2–6	2–4	4–4	3–4
Italy				7–2	17–2	2–5
Germany					5–3	1–2
Chile						1–6
Switzerland						

Team	Pld	W	D	L	GF	GA	GD	Pts	Qualification
Spain	5	4	0	1	34	8	+26	8	Advanced to quarter-finals
Switzerland	5	4	0	1	17	11	+6	8	Advanced to quarter-finals
Italy	5	4	0	1	37	14	+23	8	Advanced to quarter-finals
Germany	5	2	0	3	12	23	−11	4	Advanced to quarter-finals
France	5	0	1	4	13	27	−14	1	
Chile	5	0	1	4	11	41	−30	1	

== Final phase ==
=== 9th to 12th play-off ===
Team	FRA	CHI	AND	NED
France		5–1	3–2	2–2
Chile			4–3	1–3
Andorra				4–0
Netherlands				

Team	Pld	W	D	L	GF	GA	GD	Pts
France	3	2	1	0	10	5	+5	5
Netherlands	3	1	1	1	5	7	−2	3
Chile	3	1	0	2	6	11	−5	2
Andorra	3	1	0	2	9	7	+2	2

=== Final round ===
Quarter-finals
Recife
Spain	4
Angola	0
Recife
Argentina	4
Italy	3
Recife
Portugal	11
Germany	3
Recife
Brazil	5
Switzerland	3

Semi-finals
Recife
Spain	2
Argentina	3
Recife
Portugal	5
Brazil	1

Final
Recife
(gold) Argentina	5
(silver) Portugal	1
Third place
Recife
(bronze) Spain	2
Brazil	0

Fifth–eighth places
Recife
Angola	2
Italy	9
Recife
Germany	0
Switzerland	5

Fifth place
Recife
Italy	5
Switzerland	1
Seventh place
Recife
Angola	5
Germany	4

== Standings ==
	Team
1st place, gold medalist(s)	Argentina
2nd place, silver medalist(s)	Portugal
3rd place, bronze medalist(s)	Spain
4th	Brazil
5th	Italy
6th	Switzerland
7th	Angola
8th	Germany
9th	France
10th	Netherlands
11th	Chile
12th	Andorra

== See also ==
- FIRS Roller Hockey World Cup
