= 1999 Rink Hockey World Championship =

Tournament details
- Host country: Spain
- City: Reus
- Teams: 12

Final positions
- Champions: Argentina (4th title)

Tournament statistics
- Matches played: 48

The 1999 Rink Hockey World Championship was the 34th edition of the Rink Hockey World Championship, held between 4 and 12 June 1999, in Reus, Catalonia, Spain. It was disputed by 12 teams.

== Format ==
The competition was disputed by 12 countries, divided in two groups of 6 teams each one.

Every game lasted 40 minutes, divided in 2 parts of 20 minutes.

== Matches ==
=== Group stage ===
==== Group A ====
Team	Pld	W	D	L	GF	GA	GD	Pts
Spain	5	5	0	0	47	1	+46	10
Italy	5	4	0	1	22	9	+13	8
Brazil	5	2	1	2	17	29	−12	5
France	5	2	0	3	11	18	−7	4
Germany	5	1	0	4	14	30	−16	2
United States	5	0	1	4	14	38	−24	1

France	5–3	Germany

Brazil	5–3	Germany

Brazil	4–2	France

Spain	15–0	Germany

Spain	5–1	France

Spain	11–0	Brazil

Italy	4–1	Germany

Italy	4–0	France

Italy	6–1	Brazil

Italy	0–3	Spain

United States	1–7	Germany

United States	2–3	France

United States	7–7	Brazil

United States	0–13	Spain

United States	4–8	Italy

==== Group B ====
Team	Pld	W	D	L	GF	GA	GD	Pts
Argentina	5	4	1	0	31	5	+26	9
Portugal	5	4	1	0	32	6	+26	9
Switzerland	5	3	0	2	11	8	+3	6
Angola	5	2	0	3	6	21	−15	4
Mozambique	5	1	0	4	8	35	−27	2
Chile	5	0	0	5	10	23	−13	0

Switzerland	0–3	Argentina

Chile	2–5	Argentina

Chile	1–3	Switzerland

Angola	1–12	Argentina

Angola	1–4	Switzerland

Angola	3–2	Chile

Mozambique	1–10	Argentina

Mozambique	1–3	Switzerland

Mozambique	4–3	Chile

Mozambique	0–1	Angola

Portugal	1–1	Argentina

Portugal	2–1	Switzerland

Portugal	8–2	Chile

Portugal	3–0	Angola

Portugal	18–2	Mozambique

=== Championship Knockout stage ===
Quarter-finals
Spain	6
Angola	1
Brazil	2
Portugal	8
Italy	4
Switzerland	0
France	0
Argentina	10

Semi-finals
Spain	7
Portugal	6
Argentina	4
Italy	2

Final
Spain	0
Argentina	1
Third place
Portugal	5
Italy	4

=== 5th place bracket ===
Semi-finals
Angola	3
Brazil	6
Switzerland	1
France	2

Fifth place
Brazil	2
France	1
Seventh place
Angola	5
Switzerland	6

=== 9th to 12th place stage ===
Team	Pld	W	D	L	GF	GA	GD	Pts
Chile	3	2	1	0	15	7	+8	5
Mozambique	3	2	1	0	12	6	+6	5
Germany	3	1	0	2	13	12	+1	2
United States	3	0	0	3	7	22	−15	0

Chile	2–2	Mozambique

Germany	2–4	Mozambique

Germany	3–5	Chile

United States	2–6	Mozambique

United States	2–8	Chile

United States	3–8	Germany

== Final standings ==
Rank	Nation
Gold medal	Argentina
Silver medal	Spain
Bronze medal	Portugal
4	Italy
5	Brazil
6	France
7	Switzerland
8	Angola
9	Chile
10	Mozambique
11	Germany
12	United States
