= 1984 Roller Hockey World Cup =

Roller Hockey A Men's World Championships

Tournament details
- Host country: Italy
- Dates: 14 September 1984– 22 September 1984
- Teams: 10 (from 3 confederations)
- Venue(s): 1 (in 1 host city)

Final positions
- Champions: Argentina (2nd title)
- Runners-up: Italy
- Third place: Portugal
- Fourth place: Spain

Tournament statistics
- Matches played: 45
- Goals scored: 311 (6.91 per match)

The 1984 Roller Hockey World Cup was the twenty-sixth roller hockey world cup, organized by the Fédération Internationale de Roller Sports and the first edition since the creation of a B division in national roller hockey. It was contested by 10 national teams (6 from Europe, 3 from South America and 1 from North America). All the games were played in the city of Novara, in Italy, the chosen city to host the World Cup.

== Results ==
Team	SWI	POR	CHI	BRA	ESP	USA	ARG	FRG	ITA	NED
Switzerland										
Portugal	7–3									
Chile	3–3	4–10								
Brazil	9–2	3–4	5–4							
Spain	8–2	3–0	2–5	8–1						
United States	9–3	4–7	5–5	1–2	3–2					
Argentina	7–2	4–3	3–2	3–0	3–2	3–2				
West Germany	3–5	3–5	7–2	2–1	2–10	1–3	2–7			
Italy	10–0	5–4	4–2	2–1	0–0	5–3	1–2	6–2		
Netherlands	1–1	2–4	3–4	0–3	0–7	2–2	0–1	6–2	1–3	

== Standings ==
Team	Pld	W	D	L	GF	GA	GD	Pts
(gold) Argentina (C)	9	9	0	0	33	14	+19	18
(silver) Italy	9	7	1	1	42	17	+25	15
(bronze) Portugal	9	6	0	3	44	31	+13	12
Spain	9	5	1	3	42	16	+26	11
United States	9	3	2	4	32	30	+2	8
Brazil	9	4	0	5	25	26	−1	8
Chile	9	2	2	5	33	48	−15	6
Netherlands	9	1	2	6	15	27	−12	4
West Germany	9	2	0	7	24	45	−21	4
Switzerland	9	1	2	6	21	57	−36	4

(C) 1984 World Champion

== See also ==
- FIRS Roller Hockey World Cup
