= 2009 Rink Hockey World Championship =

2009 FIRS Roller Hockey World Cup
Tournament details
- Host country: Spain
- Dates: 5–11 July 2009
- Teams: 16 (from 5 confederations)
- Venue(s): Vigo, Pontevedra

Final positions
- Champions: Spain (14th title)
- Runners-up: Argentina
- Third place: Portugal
- Fourth place: Brazil

Tournament statistics
- Matches played: 48
- Goals scored: 253 (5.27 per match)
- Top scorer(s): (Argentina) Pablo Álvarez (14)

The 2009 Rink Hockey World Championship was the 39th edition of the Rink Hockey World Championship, held between 5 and 11 July 2009, in Vigo, Spain. It was disputed by 16 countries.

== Format ==
The competition is disputed by 16 countries, divided in four groups of 4 teams each one.

Every game lasted 40 minutes, divided in 2 parts of 20 minutes.

== Matches ==
All times are Central European Summer Time (UTC+2).

=== Group stage ===
==== Group A ====
Team	Pld	W	D	L	GF	GA	GD	Pts
Spain	3	3	0	0	26	2	+24	9
Angola	3	1	1	1	7	5	+2	4
Mozambique	3	0	2	1	2	9	−7	2
Colombia	3	0	1	2	0	19	−19	1

4 July 2009
20:30

Spain	7 – 0	Mozambique

Vigo

5 July 2009
19:45

Angola	3 – 0	Colombia

Vigo

6 July 2009
16:30

Angola	2 – 2	Mozambique

Vigo

6 July 2009
19:45

Colombia	0 – 16	Spain

Vigo

7 July 2009
16:30

Colombia	0 – 0	Mozambique

Vigo

7 July 2009
19:45

Angola	2 – 3	Spain

Vigo

==== Group B ====
Team	Pld	W	D	L	GF	GA	GD	Pts
Brazil	3	3	0	0	12	3	+9	9
Switzerland	3	2	0	1	9	6	+3	6
Andorra	3	1	0	2	9	7	+2	3
Netherlands	3	0	0	3	2	16	−14	0

5 July 2009
18:15

Switzerland	4 – 0	Netherlands

Vigo

5 July 2009
21:30

Brazil	2 – 1	Andorra

Vigo

6 July 2009
18:15

Switzerland	3 – 2	Andorra

Vigo

6 July 2009
21:30

Netherlands	0 – 6	Brazil

Vigo

7 July 2009
18:15

Switzerland	2 – 4	Brazil

Vigo

7 July 2009
21:30

Netherlands	2 – 6	Andorra

Vigo

==== Group C ====
Team	Pld	W	D	L	GF	GA	GD	Pts
Argentina	3	3	0	0	31	4	+27	9
Portugal	3	2	0	1	21	6	+15	6
Chile	3	1	0	2	6	10	−4	3
United States	3	0	0	3	4	42	−38	0

5 July 2009
16:30

Chile	1 – 4	Argentina

Pontevedra

5 July 2009
18:15

United States	1 – 15	Portugal

Pontevedra

6 July 2009
18:15

Argentina	24 – 1	United States

Pontevedra

6 July 2009
21:30

Chile	2 – 4	Portugal

Pontevedra

7 July 2009
16:30

Chile	3 – 2	United States

Pontevedra

7 July 2009
21:30

Argentina	3 – 2	Portugal

Pontevedra

==== Group D ====
Team	Pld	W	D	L	GF	GA	GD	Pts
France	3	2	1	0	11	3	+8	7
Italy	3	2	1	0	10	4	+6	7
Germany	3	1	0	2	7	12	−5	3
England	3	0	0	3	3	12	−9	0

5 July 2009
19:45

Germany	2 – 7	France

Pontevedra

5 July 2009
21:30

England	1 – 6	Italy

Pontevedra

6 July 2009
16:30

England	0 – 3	France

Pontevedra

6 July 2009
19:45

Italy	3 – 2	Germany

Pontevedra

7 July 2009
18:15

England	2 – 3	Germany

Pontevedra

7 July 2009
19:45

Italy	1 – 1	France

Pontevedra

=== Championship Knockout stage ===
Quarter-finals
9 July – Vigo
Brazil	4
Angola	0
9 July – Vigo
Argentina	3
Italy	2
9 July – Vigo
Spain	4
Switzerland	1
9 July – Vigo
France	2
Portugal	4

Semi-finals
10 July – Vigo
Brazil	2
Argentina	5
10 July – Vigo
Spain	2
Portugal	1

Final
11 July – Vigo
Argentina	1
Spain	3
Third place
11 July – Vigo
Brazil	3
Portugal	8

=== 5th–8th places bracket ===
Semi-finals
10 July – Vigo
Angola	5
Italy	2
10 July – Vigo
Switzerland	2
France	3

Fifth place
11 July – Vigo
Angola	2
France	3
Seventh place
11 July – Vigo
Italy	1 (1)
Switzerland	1 (0)

=== 9th–12th places bracket ===
Quarter-finals
9 July – Pontevedra
Mozambique	3
Netherlands	0
9 July – Pontevedra
Germany	4
United States	2
9 July – Pontevedra
Andorra	1
Colombia	4
9 July – Pontevedra
Chile	3
England	2

Semi finals
10 July – Pontevedra
Mozambique	2
Germany	7
10 July – Pontevedra
Colombia	2
Chile	4

Ninth place
11 July – Pontevedra
Germany	2
Chile	3
Eleventh place
11 July – Pontevedra
Mozambique	4
Colombia	1

=== 13th–16th places bracket ===
Semi-finals
10 July – Pontevedra
Netherlands	6
United States	5
10 July – Pontevedra
Andorra	2
England	4

Thirteenth place
11 July – Pontevedra
Netherlands	2
England	3
Fifteenth place
11 July – Pontevedra
United States	4
Andorra	3

== Final standings ==
Rank	Nation
Gold medal	Spain
Silver medal	Argentina
Bronze medal	Portugal
4	Brazil
5	France
6	Angola
7	Italy
8	Switzerland
9	Chile
10	Germany
11	Mozambique
12	Colombia
13	England
14	Netherlands
15	United States
16	Andorra

2009 Rink Hockey World Championship
SPAIN
14th title
