= 1966 Roller Hockey World Cup =

Roller Hockey Men's World Championships

Tournament details
- Host country: Brazil
- Dates: 11 May 1966– 20 May 1966
- Teams: 10 (from 3 confederations)
- Venue(s): 1 (in 1 host city)

Final positions
- Champions: Spain (5th title)
- Runners-up: Portugal
- Third place: Argentina
- Fourth place: Italy

Tournament statistics
- Matches played: 45
- Goals scored: 284 (6.31 per match)

The 1966 Roller Hockey World Cup was the seventeenth roller hockey world cup, organized by the Fédération Internationale de Roller Sports. It was contested by 10 national teams (6 from Europe, 3 from South America and 1 from North America, for the first time ever). All the games were played in the city of São Paulo, in Brazil, the chosen city to host the World Cup.

== Results ==
| Team | CHI | ENG | USA | BRA | POR | NED | SWI | ITA | ARG | ESP |
|---|---|---|---|---|---|---|---|---|---|---|
| Chile | | | | | | | | | | |
| England | 3–2 | | | | | | | | | |
| United States | 1–2 | 6–5 | | | | | | | | |
| Brazil | 2–5 | 2–6 | 2–0 | | | | | | | |
| Portugal | 9–0 | 11–1 | 13–2 | 10–0 | | | | | | |
| Netherlands | 5–6 | 5–0 | 2–4 | 3–1 | 2–9 | | | | | |
| Switzerland | 6–3 | 5–2 | 2–4 | 2–1 | 0–2 | 2–6 | | | | |
| Italy | 1–1 | 6–4 | 3–2 | 4–0 | 1–1 | 4–3 | 2–4 | | | |
| Argentina | 6–2 | 5–0 | 2–0 | 2–0 | 0–5 | 6–3 | 2–2 | 2–2 | | |
| Spain | 9–0 | 6–1 | 8–0 | 2–1 | 1–0 | 5–3 | 6–4 | 4–1 | 5–0 | |

== Standings ==
| Team | Pld | W | D | L | GF | GA | GD | Pts |
|---|---|---|---|---|---|---|---|---|
| (gold) Spain (C) | 9 | 9 | 0 | 0 | 46 | 10 | +36 | 18 |
| (silver) Portugal | 9 | 7 | 1 | 1 | 60 | 7 | +53 | 15 |
| (bronze) Argentina | 9 | 5 | 2 | 2 | 25 | 19 | +6 | 12 |
| Italy | 9 | 4 | 3 | 2 | 24 | 20 | +4 | 11 |
| Switzerland | 9 | 4 | 1 | 4 | 27 | 28 | −1 | 9 |
| Chile | 9 | 3 | 1 | 5 | 21 | 42 | −21 | 7 |
| United States | 9 | 3 | 0 | 6 | 19 | 39 | −20 | 6 |
| Netherlands | 9 | 3 | 0 | 6 | 31 | 37 | −6 | 6 |
| England | 9 | 2 | 0 | 7 | 22 | 48 | −26 | 4 |
| Brazil | 9 | 1 | 0 | 8 | 9 | 34 | −25 | 2 |

(C) 1966 World Champion

== See also ==
- FIRS Roller Hockey World Cup
