= Roller Hockey Pan American Championships =

Roller Hockey Pan American Championship
- Governing body: Confederación Panamericana de Roller Sports
- No. of teams: 6
- Current champion: Argentina
- Most successful team: Argentina (9)

The Roller Hockey Pan American Championship is a Rink Hockey competition between the best male and female national teams from American Continent. It happens every two years and it is organized by CPRS.

== Men's Historical ==
| Year | Host | Winners | Score | Runners-up | Third Place | Score | Fourth Place | Teams |
|---|---|---|---|---|---|---|---|---|
| 2024 Details | (Colombia); Bogotá | Argentina | 3–2 | Chile | (United States) USA | 3–2 | Colombia | 6 |
| 2021 Details | (United States); Stuart | Chile | 4–2 | Colombia | Mexico | — | | 3 |
| 2018 Details | (Colombia); Bogotá | Argentina | 2–1 | Chile | Colombia | 7–2 | Brazil | 7 |
| 2011 Details | (Argentina); Rosario | Argentina | 3–2 | Chile | Colombia | 5–4 | Uruguay | 4 |
| 2005 | (Argentina); Mar del Plata | Argentina | Group | Chile | Colombia | Group | (United States) USA | 6 |
| 1995 | (Argentina); Mar del Plata | Argentina | Group | Brazil | Colombia | Group | (United States) USA | 5 |
| 1993 | (Cuba); Havana | Argentina | Group | (United States) USA | Brazil | Group | Colombia | 6 |
| 1991 | (Cuba); Havana | Argentina | Group | Brazil | (United States) USA | Group | Colombia | 6 |
| 1987 | (United States); Indianapolis | Argentina | Group | (United States) USA | Brazil | Group | Colombia | 5 |
| 1983 | (Brazil); Sertãozinho | Brazil | Group | (United States) USA | Argentina | Group | Chile | 4 |
| 1979 | (Puerto Rico); San Juan | Argentina | Group | Brazil | Chile | Group | (United States) USA | 5 |

=== Men's medal table ===
| Rank | Nation | Gold | Silver | Bronze | Total |
|---|---|---|---|---|---|
| 1 | Argentina (ARG) | 9 | 0 | 1 | 10 |
| 2 | Chile (CHI) | 1 | 4 | 1 | 6 |
| 3 | Brazil (BRA) | 1 | 3 | 2 | 6 |
| 4 | United States (USA) | 0 | 3 | 2 | 5 |
| 5 | Colombia (COL) | 0 | 1 | 4 | 5 |
| 6 | Mexico (MEX) | 0 | 0 | 1 | 1 |
| Totals (6 entries) | | 11 | 11 | 11 | 33 |

== Women's Historical ==
| Year | Host | Winners | Score | Runners-up | Third Place | Score | Fourth Place | Teams |
|---|---|---|---|---|---|---|---|---|
| 2024 Details | (Colombia); Bogotá | Argentina | 1–0 | Chile | Colombia | 3–1 | Brazil | 6 |
| 2021 Details | (United States); Stuart | Chile | 5–0 | Colombia | United States | — | | 3 |
| 2018 Details | (Colombia); Bogotá | Argentina | 1–0 | Chile | Colombia | 3–1 | Brazil | 5 |
| 2011 Details | (Argentina); Rosario | Chile | 10–1 | Uruguay | | | | 2 |
| 2005 | (Argentina); Mar del Plata | Argentina | Group | Chile | Mexico | Group | Uruguay | 4 |

=== Women's medal table ===
| Rank | Nation | Gold | Silver | Bronze | Total |
|---|---|---|---|---|---|
| 1 | Argentina (ARG) | 3 | 0 | 0 | 3 |
| 2 | Chile (CHI) | 2 | 3 | 0 | 5 |
| 3 | Colombia (COL) | 0 | 1 | 2 | 3 |
| 4 | Uruguay (URU) | 0 | 1 | 0 | 1 |
| 5 | Mexico (MEX) | 0 | 0 | 1 | 1 |
| 5 | United States (USA) | 0 | 0 | 1 | 1 |
| Totals (6 entries) | | 5 | 5 | 4 | 14 |

== Men's U-19 Historical ==
| Year | Host | Winners | Score | Runners-up | Third Place | Score | Fourth Place | Teams |
|---|---|---|---|---|---|---|---|---|
| 2018 Details | (Colombia); Bogotá | Argentina | 4–0 | Chile | Colombia | 5-1 | United States | 5 |

=== Men's U-19 medal table ===
| Rank | Nation | Gold | Silver | Bronze | Total |
|---|---|---|---|---|---|
| 1 | Argentina (ARG) | 1 | 0 | 0 | 1 |
| 2 | Chile (CHI) | 0 | 1 | 0 | 1 |
| 3 | Colombia (COL) | 0 | 0 | 1 | 1 |
| Totals (3 entries) | | 1 | 1 | 1 | 3 |
