= 2018 Roller Hockey Asia Cup =

The 2018 Roller Hockey Asia Cup was the 18th edition of this tournament, played in Namwon, South Korea between 7 and 13 September 2018. Australia conquered their first title ever.

This tournament served as qualifier for the 2019 Roller Hockey World Cup, by giving only one place in the Intercontinental Championship, second tier, by and five for the Challenger Championship.

== Standings ==
Pos	Team	Pld	W	D	L	GF	GA	GD	Pts	Qualification	(Australia)	(Macau)	(Japan)	(India)	(Chinese Taipei)	(New Zealand)	(China)
1	Australia	6	5	1	0	40	10	+30	16	Qualification to the Intercontinental Championship	—	3–3	4–1	5–1		5–1	16–0
2	Macau	6	4	2	0	67	20	+47	14	Qualification to Challenger Championship		—	6–6	8–4		12–3	25–2
3	Japan	6	4	1	1	38	19	+19	13	Qualification to Challenger Championship			—		5–3	8–1	16–4
4	India	6	3	0	3	41	22	+19	9	Qualification to Challenger Championship			1–2	—	8–4		14–2
5	Chinese Taipei	6	2	0	4	39	40	−1	6	Qualification to Challenger Championship	4–7	2–13			—		13–1
6	New Zealand	6	1	0	5	22	52	−30	3	Qualification to Challenger Championship				1–13	6–13	—	
7	China	6	0	0	6	10	94	−84	0							1–10	—

Source: FIRS
