= 2010 FIRS Men's B-Roller Hockey World Cup =

2010 FIRS B-World Cup
Dornbirn 2010
- FIRS Roller Hockey Championship Dornbirn 2010 official logo

Tournament details
- Host country: Austria
- Dates: 23 October – 30 October
- Teams: 12 (from 5 confederations)
- Venue: Dornbirn Arena (in 1 host city)

Final positions
- Champions: United States (3rd title)
- Runners-up: South Africa
- Third place: Netherlands
- Fourth place: Austria

Tournament statistics
- Matches played: 48
- Goals scored: 517 (10.77 per match)
- Top scorer: Boogers Lowie

The 2010 FIRS Men's B-Roller Hockey World Cup or 2010 B-World Cup was the 14th edition of the Roller Hockey B World Championship, held from 23 to 30 October, in Dornbirn, Austria. This was an Official competition organized by CIRH.

== Final Classification ==
Pos.	Country	
1.	United States	qualified to WC 2011
2.	South Africa	qualified to WC 2011
3.	Netherlands	qualified to WC 2011
4.	Austria	
5.	Macau	
6.	Uruguay	
7.	Egypt	
8.	Australia	
9.	New Zealand	
10.	Israel	
11.	Japan	
12.	India	

The three first classified are qualified to 2011 CIRH World Cup, in San Juan, Argentina.
