= 1955 Roller Hockey World Cup =

Roller Hockey Men's World Championships

Tournament details
- Host country: Italy
- Dates: 14 May 1955– 21 May 1955
- Teams: 14 (from 2 confederations)
- Venue(s): 6 (in 6 host cities)

Final positions
- Champions: Spain (3rd title)
- Runners-up: Italy
- Third place: Portugal
- Fourth place: Switzerland

Tournament statistics
- Matches played: 61
- Goals scored: 328 (5.38 per match)

The 1955 Roller Hockey World Cup was the eleventh roller hockey world cup, organized by the Fédération Internationale de Patinage a Roulettes (now under the name of Fédération Internationale de Roller Sports). It was contested by 14 national teams (13 from Europe and 1 from South America) and it is also considered the 1955 European Roller Hockey Championship (despite the presence of Chile). Each group was played in a different Italian city, with the final-eight played in the city of Milan, in Italy (officially the host city).

== Group stage ==
=== Group A ===
- All the games played in Modena, Italy

Team	Pld	W	D	L	GF	GA	GD	Pts	Qualification	ESP	CHI	FRA	DEN
Spain	3	3	0	0	19	3	+16	6	Advancing to final-eight		2–1	7–1	10–1
Chile	3	1	1	1	15	4	+11	3	Advancing to final-eight				
France	3	1	1	1	13	9	+4	3			2–2		
Denmark	3	0	0	3	1	32	−31	0			0–12	0–10	

=== Group B ===
- All the games played in Trieste, Italy

Team	Pld	W	D	L	GF	GA	GD	Pts	Qualification	POR	FRG	NED
Portugal	2	1	1	0	10	2	+8	3	Advancing to final-eight		2–2	8–0
West Germany	2	1	1	0	5	3	+2	3	Advancing to final-eight			3–1
Netherlands	2	0	0	2	1	11	−10	0				

=== Group C ===
- All the games played in Novara, Italy

Team	Pld	W	D	L	GF	GA	GD	Pts	Qualification	ITA	SWI	IRE
Italy	2	2	0	0	13	1	+12	4	Advancing to final-eight		5–1	8–0
Switzerland	2	1	0	1	11	6	+5	2	Advancing to final-eight			10–1
Ireland	2	0	0	2	1	18	−17	0				

=== Group D ===
- All the games played in Monza, Italy

Team	Pld	W	D	L	GF	GA	GD	Pts	Qualification	BEL	ENG	NOR	YUG
Belgium	3	3	0	0	22	4	+18	6	Advancing to final-eight		4–2	8–1	10–1
England	3	2	0	1	16	7	+9	4	Advancing to final-eight			7–1	7–2
Norway	3	0	1	2	4	17	−13	1					2–2
Yugoslavia	3	0	1	2	5	19	−14	1					

== Final phase ==
=== 9th to 14th play-off ===
Team	YUG	NOR	NED	IRE	DEN	FRA
Yugoslavia						
Norway	0–1					
Netherlands	3–2	8–2				
Ireland	3–0	1–1	1–4			
Denmark	0–4	0–4	1–11	0–7		
France	0–1	1–0	3–3	2–1	7–0	

- All the games played in Pistoia, Italy

Team	Pld	W	D	L	GF	GA	GD	Pts
Netherlands	5	4	1	0	29	9	+20	9
France	5	3	1	1	13	5	+8	7
Yugoslavia	5	3	0	2	8	6	+2	6
Ireland	5	2	1	2	13	7	+6	5
Norway	5	1	1	3	7	11	−4	3
Denmark	5	0	0	5	1	33	−32	0

=== Final-eight ===
Team	BEL	FRG	CHI	ENG	ESP	ITA	SWI	POR
Belgium								
West Germany	1–2							
Chile	2–0	1–2						
England	1–1	3–3	1–2					
Spain	3–0	5–0	3–1	3–1				
Italy	2–0	5–0	3–0	3–2	1–2			
Switzerland	5–1	4–3	4–2	2–0	1–4	1–2		
Portugal	3–1	5–2	4–1	8–6	3–3	0–1	2–0	

- All the games played in Milan, Italy

Team	Pld	W	D	L	GF	GA	GD	Pts
(gold) Spain (C)	7	6	1	0	23	7	+16	13
(silver) Italy	7	6	0	1	17	5	+12	12
(bronze) Portugal	7	5	1	1	25	14	+11	11
Switzerland	7	4	0	3	17	14	+3	8
Chile	7	2	0	5	9	17	−8	4
Belgium	7	1	1	5	5	17	−12	3
West Germany	7	1	1	5	11	25	−14	3
England	7	0	2	5	14	22	−8	2

(C) 1955 World Champion

== Standings ==
	Team
1st place, gold medalist(s)	Spain
2nd place, silver medalist(s)	Italy
3rd place, bronze medalist(s)	Portugal
4th	Switzerland
5th	Chile
6th	Belgium
7th	West Germany
8th	England
9th	Netherlands
10th	France
11th	Yugoslavia
12th	Ireland
13th	Norway
14th	Denmark

== See also ==
- FIRS Roller Hockey World Cup
- CERH European Roller Hockey Championship
