= 1954 Roller Hockey World Cup =

Roller Hockey Men's World Championships

Tournament details
- Host country: Spain
- Dates: 27 May 1954– 9 June 1954
- Teams: 15 (from 3 confederations)
- Venue(s): 1 (in 1 host city)

Final positions
- Champions: Spain (2nd title)
- Runners-up: Portugal
- Third place: Italy
- Fourth place: Belgium

Tournament statistics
- Matches played: 105
- Goals scored: 690 (6.57 per match)

The 1954 Roller Hockey World Cup was the tenth roller hockey world cup, organized by the Fédération Internationale de Patinage a Roulettes (now under the name of Fédération Internationale de Roller Sports). It was contested by 15 national teams (12 from Europe, 2 from South America and 1 from Africa) and it is also considered the 1954 European Roller Hockey Championship (despite the presence of non-European teams). All the games were played in the city of Barcelona, in Spain, the chosen city to host the World Cup.

== Results ==
Team	SWI	BEL	FRG	ESP	ITA	POR	DEN	IRE	EGY	FRA	ENG	NOR	NED	URU	CHI
Switzerland															
Belgium	3–3														
West Germany	3–3	0–2													
Spain	2–0	2–1	4–2												
Italy	4–3	2–0	3–2	1–2											
Portugal	5–1	3–1	7–1	0–3	2–0										
Denmark	0–10	1–8	3–4	0–16	0–14	1–12									
Ireland	0–3	0–4	0–13	1–10	0–12	0–9	6–2								
Egypt	1–7	0–6	0–9	0–13	0–7	0–11	4–3	3–5							
France	2–5	1–1	2–2	0–2	1–0	1–2	4–0	3–0	6–0						
England	1–7	3–5	4–4	1–3	2–5	1–6	11–1	8–1	5–1	3–1					
Norway	0–5	0–7	1–10	0–9	1–10	1–14	3–1	3–5	3–4	2–5	1–9				
Netherlands	3–2	2–4	0–7	2–9	2–3	2–11	11–1	6–1	6–0	2–2	1–6	10–1			
Uruguay	1–8	0–2	2–5	1–8	1–3	2–8	4–2	5–3	3–2	0–2	4–3	3–0	2–3		
Chile	2–6	2–1	0–5	1–4	1–2	1–2	7–0	3–0	5–1	0–0	1–3	2–0	3–2	3–0	

== Standings ==
Team	Pld	W	D	L	GF	GA	GD	Pts
(gold) Spain (C)	14	14	0	0	87	10	+77	28
(silver) Portugal	14	13	0	1	92	15	+77	26
(bronze) Italy	14	11	0	3	66	17	+49	22
Belgium	14	8	2	4	45	19	+26	18
France	14	7	4	3	33	16	+17	18
West Germany	14	7	3	4	66	31	+35	17
Switzerland	14	7	2	5	59	31	+28	16
England	14	7	1	6	61	41	+20	15
Chile	14	7	1	6	32	26	+6	15
Netherlands	14	6	1	7	52	52	0	13
Uruguay	14	5	0	9	28	51	−23	10
Ireland	14	3	0	11	22	84	−62	6
Egypt	14	2	0	12	16	89	−73	4
Norway	14	1	0	13	16	94	−78	2
Denmark	14	0	0	14	15	114	−99	0

(C) 1954 World Champion

== See also ==
- FIRS Roller Hockey World Cup
- CERH European Roller Hockey Championship
