= Ian Tarrafeta =

Spanish handball player (born 1999)

Personal information
- Full name: Ian Tarrafeta Serrano
- Born: 4 January 1999 (age 27) Sabadell, Spain
- Height: 1.88 m (6 ft 2 in)

Sport
- Sport: Handball
- Position: Centre back
- Current club: HBC Nantes
- Number: 9

Senior clubs
- Years: Team
- 2017–2020: BM Granollers
- 2020–2025: Pays d'Aix UC
- 2025–: HBC Nantes
National team
Years	Team	Apps	(Gls)
2019–	Spain	61	(140)
Medal record
Olympic Games
Bronze medal – third place	2024 Paris	Team
World Championship
Bronze medal – third place	2023 Poland/Sweden
European Championship
Silver medal – second place	2022 Hungary/Slovakia
Mediterranean Games
Gold medal – first place	2022 Oran	Team
Youth World Championship
Silver medal – second place	2017 Georgia
- Updated on 13 January 2025

Ian Tarrafeta Serrano (Note: In this Spanish name, the first or paternal surname is Tarrafeta and the second or maternal family name is Serrano.) (born 4 January 1999) is a Spanish handball player who plays for HBC Nantes and the Spanish national team.

== Club career ==
Tarrafeta comes from Sabadell, a suburb of Barcelona. He made his debut in the EHF Cup and in the highest Spanish league, the Liga ASOBAL, with BM Granollers in the 2016/17 season. The playmaker signed his first professional contract for the 2017/18 season. With Granollers, he subsequently qualified for the European Cup by finishing third, fifth and sixth in the league. In the 2020/21 season, he began playing in France for Pays d'Aix UC in the Starligue. With a fourth and a third place in the French championship, he achieved the best placing in the club's history with PAUC. After the 2021/22 season, Tarrafeta was voted the best rookie in the Starligue.

== International career ==
With the Spanish youth national team, in which he made his debut on 8 April 2016, Tarrafeta finished 6th at the 2016 U-18 European Championship, was top scorer with 58 goals and was selected to the All-Star team. Tarrafeta played his first game with the Spanish junior national team on 28 October 2017. He won the silver medal with the selection at the 2017 U-19 World Championship. In nine games he scored 31 goals and was again selected to the All-Star team.

Tarrafeta made his debut for the Spanish senior national team on 23 October 2019 against Poland at the Four Nations Tournament in San Juan, Argentina. At the 2022 European Championship, he scored twelve goals in seven games and won the silver medal with the Iberians. At the 2022 Mediterranean Games, he won the gold medal with Spain. He took part in a World Championship for the first time in January 2023 in Poland and Sweden. In his first game there, he suffered a rib injury. He won the bronze medal with the Spanish selection for the 2023 World Championship.

By January 2024, Tarrafeta had played 42 international matches, in which he scored 93 goals.
