= Rink Hockey American Cup =

- Copa America Logo-Tournament in 2010
- Founded: 2006
- Region: Americas (CSP)
- Teams: 8 (finals)
- Current champions: Argentina (2nd title)
- Most championships: Argentina (2 titles)
- Website: http://www.cspatin.org/
- Vic 2010

The Rink Hockey American Championship or CSP Copa America is a Rink Hockey competition with the national teams of American countries that happens every four years. It is organized by CSP, South American Federation of Rink Hockey.

The last "Copa America" was held in Vic, Catalonia, and for the first time both men's and women's tournaments were played at the same time and in the same city.

The national teams to participate were:

Men Teams	Women Teams
Catalonia	Catalonia
Argentina	Argentina
Brazil	Brazil
Chile	Chile
(United States) USA	United States
Uruguay	Uruguay
Ecuador	DNP
Costa Rica	DNP
Germany	Germany
South Africa	South Africa

== Men's Results ==
=== Tournaments ===
Year	Host city	(gold) Gold	(silver) Silver	(bronze) Bronze	4th Place	5th place	6th place
2012	(Chile)						
2010	(Spain) Vic	Catalonia	Argentina	Brazil	Chile	Germany	Uruguay
2008	(Argentina) Buenos Aires	Argentina	Catalonia	Chile	Brazil	Colombia	United States
2007	(Brazil) Recife	Argentina	Catalonia	Brazil	Chile	Colombia	South Africa

=== Medal table ===
Rank	Nation	Gold	Silver	Bronze	Total
1	Argentina (ARG)	2	1	0	3
2	Catalonia (CAT)	1	2	0	3
3	Brazil (BRA)	0	0	2	2
4	Chile (CHI)	0	0	1	1
5	Colombia (COL)	0	0	0	0
5	United States (USA)	0	0	0	0
Totals (6 entries)		3	3	3	9

== Women Results ==
=== Tournaments ===
Year	Host city	(gold) Gold	(silver) Silver	(bronze) Bronze	4th Place	5th place	6th place
2013	(Uruguay) Punta del Este						
2011	(Brazil) Sertãozinho	Catalonia	Chile	Brazil	Uruguay	South Africa	
2010	(Spain) Vic	Argentina	Catalonia	Chile	Germany	Brazil	United States
2007	(Chile) Santiago	Chile	Catalonia	Brazil	United States	Colombia	
2006	(Chile) Santiago	Argentina	Chile	Catalonia	Colombia		

=== Medal table ===
Rank	Nation	Gold	Silver	Bronze	Total
1	Argentina (ARG)	2	0	0	2
2	Catalonia (CAT)	1	2	1	4
2	Chile (CHI)	1	2	1	4
4	Brazil (BRA)	0	0	2	2
Totals (4 entries)		4	4	4	12

== Next tournaments ==
The celebration of the 2012 Men's Cup was originally designed to be played in Santiago de Chile, but in the end it was changed to be played in November in the Brazilian city of Recife. One month before the competition, the Catalan Federation announced that the team couldn't play in the Cup because the Catalan government decided not to support the team economically, and at the same time, the Argentinian Federation also announced that they won't be playing either as they were having internal problems. Seeing that the two bigger countries were not coming to the event, the 2012 Men's Cup was disbanded.

The Uruguayan city of Montevideo was selected as host for the 2013 Woman's Cup, but the celebration of that event was not possible for the same problems.

== See also ==
- American Championships
