= Roller hockey rankings =

The roller hockey rankings are rankings of national teams and clubs of this sport.

== Men's national teams ranking ==
The unofficial national teams ranking is calculated by the Elo rating system.

This is the ranking as of 1 January 2026.

Rank	Team	Points
1	Spain	2761
2	Argentina	2699
3	Portugal	2607
4	France	2547
5	Italy	2470
6	Angola	2365
7	Chile	2328
8	Andorra	2180
9	Switzerland	2166
10	Colombia	2141

Rank	Team	Points
11	Mozambique	2102
12	Germany	2089
13	England	2035
14	Austria	1924
15	Brazil	1906
16	Uruguay	1880
17	Netherlands	1853
18	United States	1829
19	Israel	1761
20	Belgium	1721

Rank	Team	Points
21	Australia	1598
22	South Africa	1570
23	Chinese Taipei	1545
24	Egypt	1526
25	India	1467
26	Macau	1369
27	Japan	1357
28	New Zealand	1124
29	Mexico	1059
30	China	542

== Women's national teams ranking ==
As the men's ranking, the unofficial women's ranking is also calculated by using the Elo rating system.

This is the ranking updated as of 1 January 2026.

Rank	Team	Points
1	Spain	2825
2	Argentina	2743
3	Portugal	2650
4	Chile	2514
5	Italy	2509
6	Colombia	2260
7	Switzerland	2242
8	Germany	2238

Rank	Team	Points
9	France	2177
10	Brazil	2092
11	England	2029
12	Australia	1992
13	Japan	1942
14	Uruguay	1904
15	Taiwan	1896
16	South Africa	1876

Rank	Team	Points
17	United States	1759
18	India	1754
19	Netherlands	1748
20	Macau	1661
21	Egypt	1644
22	Mexico	1323
23	New Zealand	1171
24	China	518

== World Skate Europe league ranking ==
The coefficients of the league ranking take into account the performance of each association's representative teams in European competitions between the past four seasons. The coefficient is calculated by dividing the total of points accumulated by the number of participating teams and serves for determine the number of teams for each country in the Euroleague.

This is the ranking as of the end of the 2024–25 season.

Rank	League	Coefficient
1	Portugal	1859
2	Spain	1270.5
3	Italy	720
4	France	467.5
5	Switzerland	140
6	Germany	72
7	England	9

== World Skate Europe men's club ranking ==
The men's club ranking is made by the World Skate Europe for their club competitions. It is determined by the results of the clubs in the Euroleague, World Skate Europe Cup and the Continental Cup over the past four seasons.

This table shows the top 20 as of the end of the 2024–25 season.

Rank	Team	Points
1	(Italy) Trissino	290
2	(Portugal) Porto	275
3	(Portugal) Valongo	270
4	(Portugal) Barcelos	235
5	(Portugal) Oliveirense	235
6	(Portugal) Sporting CP	200
7	(Portugal) Benfica	195
8	(Spain) Barcelona	175
9	(Portugal) Tomar	155
10	(Spain) Liceo	150

Rank	Team	Points
11	(Spain) Reus	150
12	(Italy) Sarzana	150
13	(Italy) Wasken Lodi	150
14	(Spain) Calafell	145
15	(Spain) Noia	135
16	(France) Saint-Omer	130
17	(Spain) Lleida Llista Blava	110
18	(Spain) Igualada	105
19	(Spain) Voltregà	100
20	(Italy) Follonica	100

== World Skate Europe women's club ranking ==
The women's club ranking is also made by the World Skate Europe for their club competitions. It is determined by the results of the clubs in the Female League over the past four seasons.

This table shows the top 10 as of the end of the 2024–25 season.

Rank	Team	Points
1	(Spain) Gijón Solimar	150
2	(Spain) Plegamans	140
3	(Portugal) Benfica	125
4	(Spain) Vila-Sana	105
5	(Spain) Manlleu	95
6	(Spain) CP Fraga	80
7	(France) Coutras	70
8	(Spain) Cerdanyola	60
9	(France) Nantes	45
10	(Italy) Matera	45
