= Estadio Aldo Cantoni =

Indoor arena in San Juan, Argentina

Coordinates: 31.5318°S 68.5444°W

Aldo Cantoni Arena
- Estadio Aldo Cantoni
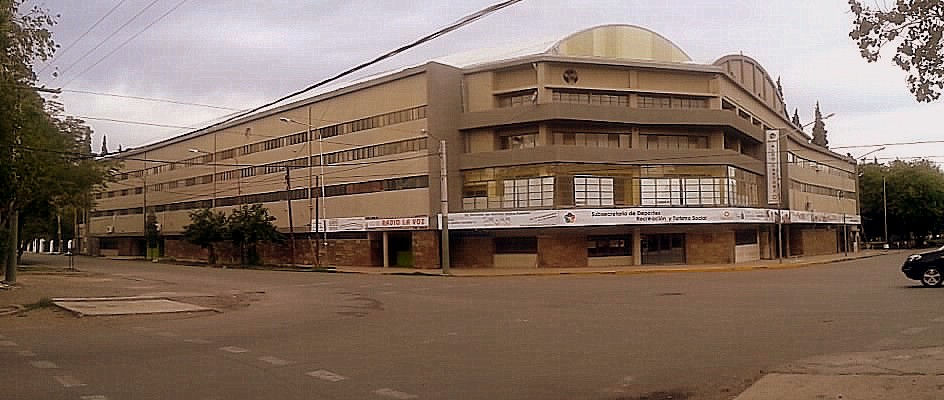
- The stadium in 2013
- Interactive map of Aldo Cantoni Arena
- Full name: Estadio Cerrado Doctor Aldo Cantoni
- Location: San Juan, Argentina
- Owner: Government of San Juan
- Capacity: 8,000
- Surface: Parquet

Construction
- Opened: 1 July 1967; 59 years ago
- Renovated: 1989, 2001, 2011, 2016

Tenant
- UPCN volley

The Estadio Aldo Cantoni is an arena located in the city of San Juan, capital of San Juan Province. Inaugurated in July 1967, it is mainly use by local clubs UPCN and Obras Pocito for their home matches for the Serie A1, the top level of the Argentine men's volleyball league system.

The stadium was named after Aldo Cantoni (1892–1948), politician, governor of San Juan Province between 1926 and 1928, twice President of the Club Atlético Huracán, President of the Argentine Football Association and co-founder of the Unión Cívica Radical Bloquista political party.

== Overview ==
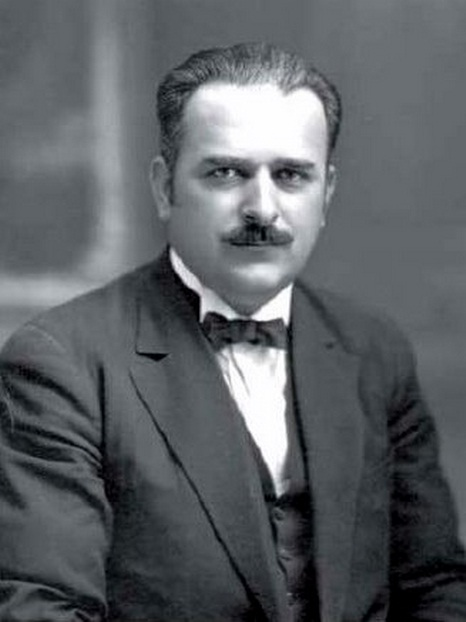
The stadium was named after Aldo Cantoni (pictured)

UPCN won the national league for six consecutive years, from 2010-11 to 2015-16 season, using the Aldo Cantoni arena as home venue.

Roller hockey is a very popular sport in Cuyo, specially in San Juan Province, where it has been practised since the 1930s. In those times, players used the recently paved streets as field to play the sport.

This stadium has hosted five times the FIRS Roller Hockey World Cup, and it is also used by several teams for their Liga Nacional Argentina A-1 matches.

San Juan was one of the venues for the 2002 FIVB Volleyball Men's World Championship, hosting five out of six matches for Group A. The opening match of the tournament, between Argentina and Australia, was held at the Luna Park Stadium, in Buenos Aires.

== Sporting events ==
Events hosted include roller hockey, volleyball, futsal, tennis, and handball matches, listed as follows:

- 1970 Roller Hockey World Cup
- 1978 Roller Hockey World Cup
- 1989 Roller Hockey World Cup
- 2001 Rink Hockey World Championship
- 2002 FIVB Volleyball Men's World Championship
- 2011 FIRS Men's Roller Hockey World Cup
- 2015 Men's South American Volleyball Club Championship
- 2017 Copa América de Futsal
- 2018 Davis Cup tie between Argentina and Chile
- 2018 Davis Cup World Group play-offs tie between Argentina and Colombia
- Torneo Cuatro Naciones de Handball 2019

== Concerts ==
On September 28, 1979, the world star Raffaella Carrà gave a concert at the venue. The movement that she generated was such that it was even decided to modify some aspects of the stadium to improve the acoustics and make it perfect just for her. At the same time an international technical team arrived in the province to set up the stage and arrange the lights under which the singer would perform.
