= Torneo Cuatro Naciones de Handball 2019 =

Friendly handball tournament organised by the Argentinean Handball Confederation

2019 Torneo Cuatro Naciones de Handball
Tournament details
- Host country: Argentina
- Venue(s): 1 (in 1 host city)
- Dates: 23–25 October
- Teams: 4 (from 2 confederations)

Final positions
- Champions: Argentina
- Runner-up: Russia
- Third place: Spain
- Fourth place: Poland

Tournament statistics
- Matches played: 6
- Goals scored: 296 (49.33 per match)
- Top scorer(s): (Spain) Jaime Fernández (Russia) Dmitrii Santalov (14 goals)

The Torneo Cuatro Naciones de Handball 2019, (2019 Four Nations Handball Tournament in spanish) held in San Juan Argentina, at the Estadio Aldo Cantoni between 23–25 October was a friendly handball tournament organised by the Argentinean Handball Confederation.

== Results ==
Team	Pld	W	D	L	GF	GA	GD	Pts
Argentina	3	2	0	1	69	70	–1	4
Russia	3	2	0	1	84	71	+13	4
Spain	3	1	1	1	81	81	0	3
Poland	3	0	1	2	82	94	–12	1

== Round robin ==
All times are local (UTC−03:00).

October 23; 18:00	Spain	24–24	Poland	Estadio Aldo Cantoni, San Juan
October 23; 18:00	Fernández 7	(12–11)	Kondratiuk 5	Estadio Aldo Cantoni, San Juan
October 23; 18:00	2× (yellow card) 3× (suspension)	Report	5× (suspension)	Estadio Aldo Cantoni, San Juan

October 23; 20:30	Argentina	24–22	Russia	Estadio Aldo Cantoni, San Juan
October 23; 20:30	Aizen 6	(11–12)	Shishkarev 6	Estadio Aldo Cantoni, San Juan
October 23; 20:30	2× (yellow card) 4× (suspension)	Report	4× (suspension) 1× (red card)	Estadio Aldo Cantoni, San Juan

October 24; 18:00	Russia	32–28	Spain	Estadio Aldo Cantoni, San Juan
October 24; 18:00	Santalov 7	(21–15)	Gómez 6	Estadio Aldo Cantoni, San Juan
October 24; 18:00	2× (yellow card) 5× (suspension)	Report	2× (yellow card) 1× (suspension)	Estadio Aldo Cantoni, San Juan

October 24; 20:30	Poland	19–20	Argentina	Estadio Aldo Cantoni, San Juan
October 24; 20:30	Langowski 6	(11–13)	Fernández 7	Estadio Aldo Cantoni, San Juan
October 24; 20:30	1× (yellow card) 4× (suspension) 1× (red card)	Report	2× (yellow card) 4× (suspension)	Estadio Aldo Cantoni, San Juan

October 25; 17:00	Poland	19–30	Russia	Estadio Aldo Cantoni, San Juan
October 25; 17:00	Szyba 5	(8–17)	Shkurinskiy 6	Estadio Aldo Cantoni, San Juan
October 25; 17:00	2× (yellow card) 2× (suspension)	Report	2× (yellow card) 3× (suspension)	Estadio Aldo Cantoni, San Juan

October 25; 19:30	Argentina	25–29	Spain	Estadio Aldo Cantoni, San Juan
October 25; 19:30	Pizarro 8	(13–13)	Saizar 8	Estadio Aldo Cantoni, San Juan
October 25; 19:30	2× (yellow card) 3× (suspension)	Report	2× (yellow card) 7× (suspension)	Estadio Aldo Cantoni, San Juan

== Final standing ==
Rank	Team
Gold medal	Argentina
2	Russia
3	Spain
4	Poland
