= Oceania Confederation of Roller Sports =

Roller skating organization

The Oceania Confederation of Roller Sports (OCRS) is the main roller skating organization of Australia and other Oceanic countries. The OCRS is part of the International Roller Sports Federation, or FIRS. Varieties of skating governed by the OCRS include:

- Inline downhill
- Roller hockey
- Inline hockey
- Speed skating
