= Chile national roller hockey team =

Chile
- Nickname: Los Escorpiones (Scorpions)
- Association: Federación Chilena de Hockey y Patinaje
- Confederation: Confederación Panamericana de Roller Sports
- Head coach: José Luis Bertrán
- Assistants: Victor Bertrán
- Captain: Diego Rojas
- Home stadium: Gimnasio Olímpico de San Miguel (capacity 7,500)
Home colours	Away colours

Ranking
- Ranking: 8th

The Chile national roller hockey team is the national team side of Chile at international roller hockey. It is part of the FIRS Roller Hockey World Cup and CSP Copa America, and is controlled by the Federación Chilena de Hockey y Patinaje.

== Tournament History ==
FIRS Roller Hockey World Cup

- 1954 - 9th - A World Cup
- 1955 - 5th - A World Cup
- 1962 - 8th - A World Cup
- 1966 - 6th - A World Cup
- 1970 - 7th - A World Cup
- 1972 - 7th - A World Cup
- 1978 - 6th - A World Cup
- 1980 - 4th - A World Cup
- 1982 - 4th - A World Cup
- 1984 - 7th - A World Cup
- 1986 - 9th - A World Cup
- 1988 - (bronze) - B World Cup
- 1989 - 4th - A World Cup
- 1991 - 11th - A World Cup
- 1994 - (bronze) - B World Cup
- 1995 - 11th - A World Cup
- 1998 - (gold) - B World Cup
- 1999 - 9th - A World Cup
- 2001 - 7th - A World Cup
- 2003 - 9th - A World Cup
- 2005 - 10th - A World Cup
- 2007 - 11th - A World Cup
- 2009 - 9th - A World Cup
- 2011 - 6th - A World Cup
- 2013 - 4th - A World Cup

== Players ==
=== Current squad ===
Roster for the 2024 Roller Hockey World Cup.

=== Goalkeepers ===
- Lúcio Armijo ( (Chile) Independiente La Florida)
- Diego García ( (Chile) Club Deportivo Thomas Bata)

=== In field ===
==== Defence ====
- Joaquín Fernández ( (Portugal) SC Marinhense)
- Gabriel Tudela ( (Italy) Correggio Hockey)
- Felipe Castro ( (Italy) Sandrigo Hockey)
- Diego Rojas ( (Spain) Reus Deportiu)
- Felipe Márquez ( (Chile) Patín Vilanova)
- Vicente Soto ( (Spain) Compañía de María Hockey)

==== Attack ====
- Álvaro Osorio ( (Spain) Club Hoquei Palafrugell)
- Benjamín Díaz ( (France) AL Saint-Sébastien)

=== Staff ===
- José Luis Bertrán (director técnico)
- Víctor Bertrán (ayudante técnico)
