= Argentina national roller hockey team =

Argentina
- Association: Argentina Roller Sports Federation
- Confederation: CPRS
- Head coach: Jose Martinazzo
Home colours	Away colours

Ranking
- Ranking: 1st

Argentina national roller hockey team
Medal record

Olympic Games
Gold medal – first place	1992 Barcelona	Team

World Cup
Gold medal – first place	1978 San Juan	
Gold medal – first place	1984 Novara	
Gold medal – first place	1995 Recife	
Gold medal – first place	1999 Reus	
Gold medal – first place	2015 La Roche-sur-Yon	
Gold medal – first place	2022 Bueno Aires & San Juan	
Silver medal – second place	1976 Oviedo	
Silver medal – second place	1980 Talcahuano	
Silver medal – second place	1997 Wuppertal	
Silver medal – second place	2001 San Juan	
Silver medal – second place	2005 San Jose	
Silver medal – second place	2009 Vigo	
Silver medal – second place	2011 San Juan	
Silver medal – second place	2013 Luanda and Namibe	
Silver medal – second place	2019 Barcelona	
Silver medal – second place	2024 Novara	
Bronze medal – third place	1960 Madrid	
Bronze medal – third place	1966 São Paulo	
Bronze medal – third place	1968 Porto	
Bronze medal – third place	1972 A Coruña	
Bronze medal – third place	1974 Lisbon	
Bronze medal – third place	1982 Barcelos	
Bronze medal – third place	1991 Porto	
Bronze medal – third place	1993 Bassano D.G/Sesto S.G	
Bronze medal – third place	2007 Montreux	
Bronze medal – third place	2017 Nanjing	

The Argentina men national roller hockey team is the national team side of Argentina at international roller hockey. It is part of FIRS Roller Hockey World Cup and CSP Copa America. In men Argentina won 5 World Cups and the only roller hockey tournament in the Olympic Games history, Barcelona 1992, and the women of Argentina won five World Cups.

== Argentina squad - 64th Nations Cup ==
Goaltenders
#	Player	Hometown	Club
1	Valentin Grimalt
Daniel Alberto Kenan
Field Players
#	Player	Hometown	Club
Matias Jose Pascual
Mariano Velazquez
Emanuel Paulo Garcia Solar
Lucas Facundo Ordonez
Esteban Avalos
Guillermo Babick
Lucas Martine
Pablo Martin Fernandez

Team Staff

- General Manager:
- Mechanic:

Coaching Staff

- Head Coach: Jose Martinazzo
- Assistant:

== Titles ==
=== Men ===
==== FIRS Roller Hockey World Cup (6) ====
- 1978, 1984, 1995, 1999, 2015, 2022

==== Copa America (2) ====
- 2007, 2008

==== Montreux Cup of Nations (5) ====
- 1989, 1993 2017, 2024, 2026

==== Roller Hockey Pan American Games (8) ====
- 1979, 1987, 1991, 1993, 1995, 2000, 2005, 2011

==== Roller Hockey Olympic Games (1) ====
- 1992

==== Rink Hockey South America Championship (12) ====
1959, 1963, 1967, 1971,1975, 1977, 1981, 1984, 1985, 1987, 2004, 2022

=== Women ===
==== FIRS Roller Hockey World Cup (6) ====
- 1998, 2002, 2004, 2010, 2014 2022

==== Copa America (2) ====
- 2006, 2010

==== Roller Hockey Pan American Games (8) ====
- 2005, 2018

==== Rink Hockey South America Championship (2) ====
- 2004, 2022
