= New Zealand national roller hockey team =

New Zealand
- Association: New Zealand Federation of Roller Sports
- Confederation: OCRS
- Head coach: Alley Langridge
- Captain: Dean Fitness

Ranking
- Ranking: 22

The New Zealand national roller hockey team is the national team side of New Zealand at international roller hockey. Usually is part of FIRS Roller Hockey B World Cup.

== New Zealand squad - 2010 FIRS Roller Hockey B World Cup ==
Goaltenders
#	Player	Hometown	Club
1	Damien Wilson
Richard Haywood
Field Players
#	Player	Hometown	Club
Rohan Singh
Issac Fraser
Elly Langridge
Rob Vazey
Dean Fitness
John Bardo (Captain)
Mark Turner
Tony Deller

Team Staff

- General Manager:Roger Bedford
- Mechanic:

Coaching Staff

- Head Coach: Russell Clark
- Assistant:
