= Colombia national roller hockey team =

Colombia
- Association: Colombia Roller Sports Federation
- Confederation: CPRS
Home colours	Away colours

Ranking
- Ranking: 12

The Colombia national roller hockey team is the national team side of Colombia at international roller hockey. Usually it is part of FIRS Roller Hockey World Cup and CSP Copa América.
