= Australia national roller hockey team =

Australia
- Association: Skate Australia
- Confederation: OCRS
- Head coach: Stephen Hoey

Ranking
- Ranking: 45

The Australia national roller hockey team is the national team side of Australia at international roller hockey.

The team usually is part of FIRS Roller Hockey B World Cup.

In 2018, the team won their first Asian Cup ever.

== Titles ==
- 1Roller Hockey Asia Cup- 2018
