= Japan national roller hockey team =

Japan
- Association: Japan Roller Skating Federation
- Confederation: CARS
- Head coach: Kentaro Shichi

Ranking
- Ranking: 25

The Japan national roller hockey team is the national team side of Japan at international roller hockey. Usually is part of FIRS Roller Hockey B World Cup and Roller Hockey Asia Cup.

== Japan squad - 2010 FIRS Roller Hockey B World Cup ==
Goaltenders
#	Player	Hometown	Club
1	Akinobu Katayama
Taizo Abe
Field Players
#	Player	Hometown	Club
Tomoyuki Sudo
Tatsuya Ishizuka
Koji Hukushima
Satoru Matsuzaki
Yuki Nishimuran
Mitsuo Kobayashi
Osamu Ishii
Akihiro Inoue

Team Staff

- General Manager:Shun Okubo
- Mechanic:

Coaching Staff

- Head Coach: Kentaro Shichi
- Assistant:

== Titles ==
- (gold) Gold: Roller Hockey Asia Cup - 1989, 1995, 1999, 2011
