= Angola national roller hockey team =

Angola
- Association: Angola Roller Sports Federation
- Confederation: FARS
- Head coach: Orlando Graça
Home colours	Away colours

Ranking
- Ranking: 7

The Angola national roller hockey team is the national team side of Angola at international roller hockey. Usually is part of FIRS Roller Hockey World Cup.

== Angola squad - 2015 FIRS Men's Roller Hockey World Cup ==
Goaltenders
#	Player	Hometown	Club
01	Hugo Garcia		(Portugal) Paço d'Arcos
10	Francisco Veludo Chico Veludo		(Portugal) HC Os Tigres
Field Players
#	Player	Hometown	Club
02	André Centeno		(Portugal) Juventude de Viana
03	Anderson Silva Nery		(Angola) Primeiro de Agosto
04	Filipe Bernardino		(Portugal) HC Os Tigres
05	Márcio Fernandes		(Angola) Petro de Luanda
06	João Vieira Johe		(Portugal) HC Os Tigres
07	Martin Payero		(Spain) CP Cerceda
08	Humberto Mendes Big		(Spain) CP Manlleu
09	João Pinto Mustang		(Portugal) Sporting CP

Team Staff

- General Manager: Faustino Casemiro
- Mechanic: José Quiteque
- Doctor: Valdemiro Diogo
- Physio: Nelson Cardoso

Coaching Staff

- Head Coach: Orlando Graça

== Titles ==
African Championship: (3)

- 2019
- 2023
- 2025

== Past squads ==
=== Angola squad - 64th Nations Cup ===
Goaltenders
#	Player	Hometown	Club
1	Silverio Quiteque
1	Tiago Sousa
Field Players
#	Player	Hometown	Club
Andre Centeno
Miguel Gomes
Silva Anacleto
Afonso Coxe
Joao Vieira
Andre Gomes
Humberto Mendes
Joao Pinto
