= Fédération Internationale de Roller Sports =

International roller sports governing body

- Abbreviation: FIRS
- Formation: April 1924
- Dissolved: September 2017 (merged into World Skate)
- Type: Federation of national associations
- Headquarters: Lausanne, Switzerland
- Region served: Worldwide
- President: Sabatino Aracu
- First Vice-President: Ricardo Grin
- Affiliations: International Olympic Committee
- Website: http://www.rollersports.org

The Fédération Internationale de Roller Sports (FIRS; English: International Federation of Roller Sports) was the world governing body for roller sports, including skateboarding, rink hockey, inline hockey, inline speed skating, inline alpine, downhill, roller derby, roller freestyle, inline freestyle, aggressive inline skating, inline figure skating and artistic roller skating. It was established in April 1924 in Montreux, Switzerland by two Swiss sportsmen, Fred Renkewitz and Otto Myer, who had close connections to the International Olympic Committee.

The FIRS gathered more than 100 national federations, including countries from every continent and they are affiliated with the International Skating Union.

A proposal to dissolve the federation and merge with the International Skateboarding Federation to form a new body known as World Skate was ratified in September 2017. Since 2017 World Skate has organised the World Roller Games, comprising all the world roller sport disciplines as regulated by the World Skate international federation.

== FIRS ==
The FIRS aimed to foster the Roller Sports movement and participation on a global scale. Its areas of responsibility were as follows:

1. Administration and Regulations
2. Organizing international competitions
3. Developing the movement worldwide
4. Promoting

The authority of FIRS was recognized by the following organizations:

- International Olympic Committee (IOC)
- General Association of International Sports Federations (GAISF)
- International World Games Association (IWGA)
- Pan American Sports Organization (PASO)

FIRS recognized the following continental confederations:

- Africa – African Confederation of Sports of Roller Skating (ACSRS)
- Europe – Confédération Européenne de Roller Skating (CERS)
- Asia – Confederation of Asia Roller Sports (CARS)
- Oceania – Oceania Confederation of Roller Sports (OCRS)
- The Americas – Confederación Panamericana de Roller Sports (CPRS)

Each continental confederation comprises or recognizes, in turn, various national governing bodies and associations.

Skating is widely recognized as one of the most comprehensive physical activities and enjoys global popularity. Current estimates suggest that over 40 million people worldwide regularly engage in recreational skating.

== FIRS Roller Hockey Competitions ==
Club Competitions

- Rink hockey World Club Championship
- Roller Hockey Intercontinental Cup

National Teams Competitions

- FIRS Roller Hockey World Cup
- FIRS Women's Roller Hockey World Cup
- FIRS Roller Hockey World Cup U-20

== Disciplines and World Championships ==
Number	Name	World Championships	Edition	First and Last Edition (Year)
1	Inline Speed Skating (Speed)	Roller Speed Skating World Championships	65	1937 / 2016
2	Inline Freestyle Skating (Slalom)	Inline Freestyle World Championships	10	2007 / 2016
3	Artistic Roller Skating (Artistic)	Artistic Skating World Championships	15	2002 / 2016
4	Roller Freestyle Skating (Aggressive)	Roller Freestyle Skating World Championships	0	-
5	Inline Downhill Skating (Downhill)	Inline Downhill World Championships	16	2000 / 2015
6	Inline Alpine Skating (Alpine)	Inline Alpine World Championships	4	2008 / 2016
7	Skateboarding	FIRS Skateboarding World Championships	0	-
8	Inline Hockey	FIRS Inline Hockey World Championships	22	1995 / 2016
9	Roller Hockey	FIRS Roller Hockey World Cup	42	1936 / 2017
10	Roller Derby	FIRS Roller Derby World Championships	0	-

- Men's Roller Derby World Cup and Women's Roller Derby World Cup organized by Blood & Thunder magazine, not FIRS.

== See also ==
- Association of IOC Recognised International Sports Federations
- Fresno Case
