= Brazil national roller hockey team =

Brazil
- Association: Brazil Roller Sports Federation
- Confederation: CPRS
- Head coach: Jordi Tresserras
| Home colours | Away colours |

Ranking
- Ranking: 4

The Brazil national roller hockey team is the national team side of Brazil at international roller hockey. Usually is part of FIRS Roller Hockey World Cup and CSP Copa America.

== Brazil squad - 2010 Rink Hockey American Championship ==
The team was the 2010 Rink Hockey American Champions.

Goaltenders
# | Player | Hometown | Club
1 | Aurelio Rieger "Lelo"
Rafael Aguiar "Batoré"
Field Players
# | Player | Hometown | Club
Rafael Novaes "Ceará"
Jackson Nascimento
"Mauricinho" Duque
Bruno Matos
Leandro André Wada
Jurandyr Silva "Didi"
Alan Karam
Michel Zanini

Team Staff

- General Manager:
- Mechanic:

Coaching Staff

- Head Coach: Gerard Pujol
- Assistant:

== Titles ==
- Gold B-Roller Hockey World Cup-1990 (1)
- Gold Roller Hockey Pan American Championships-1983 (1)
- Silver Roller Hockey World Games-2001 (1)
