= United States national roller hockey team =

United States
- Association: USA Roller Sports
- Confederation: CPRS
- Head coach: James Trussell

Ranking
- Ranking: 14

The United States national roller hockey team is the national team side of United States at international roller hockey. Usually is part of FIRS Roller Hockey World Cup and CSP Copa America.

== United States squad - 2010 FIRS Roller Hockey B World Cup ==
Goaltenders
#	Player	Hometown	Club
1	William Mihay
Troy Sato
Field Players
#	Player	Hometown	Club
Joshua Englund (Captain)
Shane Enlow
Shawn Schmelcher
Dylan Sordahl
Nic Robinson
Richard Trussell
Lucas W. Thompson
Michael Trussell

Team Staff

- General Manager:
- Mechanic:

Coaching Staff

- Head Coach: James Trussell
- Assistant: James "Pat" Ferguson

== Titles ==
- 3 FIRS Roller Hockey B World Cup- 1996, 2008, 2010
