= 2018 Rink Hockey European Championship =

Tournament details
- Host country: Spain
- City: A Coruña
- Dates: 14–22 July 2018
- Teams: 11
- Venue(s): 1 (in 1 host city)

Final positions
- Champions: Spain (17th title)
- Runners-up: Portugal
- Third place: Italy
- Fourth place: France

The 2018 Rink Hockey European Championship, also named as EuroHockey 2018, was the 53rd edition of the Rink Hockey European Championship, a biennial tournament for men's national roller hockey teams of Europe organised by World Skate Europe - Rink Hockey, which took place between 14 and 22 July in A Coruña, Spain.

Spain won the tournament and took its seventeenth title overall.

== Teams ==
Eleven teams joined the tournament. Andorra, Belgium and Netherlands joined the other eight teams from the previous edition.

This had the highest number of participants since 1994.

Team	Appearance	Last appearance	Previous best performance
Andorra	4th	2006	Eighth place (1992, 2006)
Austria	8th	2016	Eighth place (2010, 2016)
Belgium	39th	1996	Runners-up (1947)
England	52nd	2016	Champions (1926, 1927, 1928, 1929, 1930, 1931, 1932, 1934, 1936, 1937, 1938, 1939)
France	52nd	2016	Runners-up (1926, 1927, 1928, 1930, 1931)
Germany	49th	2016	Runners-up (1932, 1934)
Italy	51st	2016	Champions (1953, 1990, 2014)
Netherlands	33rd	2008	Third place (1963, 1967, 1969)
Portugal	48th	2016	Champions (1947, 1948, 1949, 1950, 1952, 1956, 1959, 1961, 1963, 1965, 1967, 1971, 1973, 1975, 1977, 1987, 1992, 1994, 1996, 1998, 2016)
Spain	40th	2016	Champions (1951, 1954, 1955, 1957, 1969, 1979, 1981, 1983, 1985, 2000, 2002, 2004, 2006, 2008, 2010, 2012)
Switzerland	53rd	2016	Runners-up (1937, 2006)

== Venue ==
All the games of the tournament took place at Pazo dos Deportes de Riazor, in A Coruña, Spain.

== Group stage ==
=== Group A ===
Pos	Team	Pld	W	D	L	PF	PA	PD	Pts	Qualification	(Portugal)	(France)	(Andorra)	(Switzerland)	(Austria)
1	Portugal	4	4	0	0	38	6	+32	12	Advance to play-off stage	—	5–4	—	7–1	—
2	France	4	3	0	1	29	10	+19	9	Advance to play-off stage	—	—	6–0	5–2	—
3	Andorra	4	2	0	2	9	19	−10	6	Advance to play-off stage	0–11	—	—	—	6–0
4	Switzerland	4	1	0	3	10	16	−6	3	Advance to play-off stage	—	—	2–3	—	5–1
5	Austria	4	0	0	4	5	40	−35	0	Advance to classification group	1–15	3–14	—	—	—

Source: EuroHockey 2018

=== Group B ===
Pos	Team	Pld	W	D	L	PF	PA	PD	Pts	Qualification	(Spain)	(Italy)	(Germany)	(England)	(Netherlands)	(Belgium)
1	Spain (H)	5	5	0	0	55	4	+51	15	Advance to play-off stage	—	2–0	7–1	10–1	—	—
2	Italy	5	4	0	1	59	15	+44	12	Advance to play-off stage	—	—	11–5	9–4	—	—
3	Germany	5	3	0	2	34	23	+11	9	Advance to play-off stage	—	—	—	8–4	5–1	—
4	England	5	2	0	3	29	33	−4	6	Advance to play-off stage	—	—	—	—	6–4	14–2
5	Netherlands	5	1	0	4	21	45	−24	3	Advance to classification group	2–14	4–15	—	—	—	10–5
6	Belgium	5	0	0	5	7	85	−78	0	Advance to classification group	0–22	0–24	0–15	—	—	—

Source: EuroHockey 2018
(H) Hosts

== Classification group ==
Pos	Team	Pld	W	D	L	PF	PA	PD	Pts	(Austria)	(Netherlands)	(Belgium)
1	Austria	2	1	1	0	9	8	+1	4	—	—	4–4
2	Netherlands	2	1	0	1	19	8	+11	3	4–5	—	—
3	Belgium	2	0	1	1	7	19	−12	1	—	3–15	—

== Play-off stage ==
Quarterfinals
20 July
Germany	2
France	5
20 July
Switzerland	2
Spain	10
20 July
Andorra	2
Italy	6
20 July
England	2
Portugal	14

Semifinals
21 July
France	2
Spain	8
21 July
Italy	2
Portugal	4

Finals
22 July
Spain	6
Portugal	3
Third place game
22 July
France	2
Italy	5

=== 5th to 8th place ===
Semifinals
21 July
England	2
Andorra	8
21 July
Switzerland	7
Germany	6

Fifth place game
22 July
Andorra	3
Switzerland	5
Seventh place game
22 July
England	6
Germany	12

== Final standings ==
Pos	Grp	Team	Pld	W	D	L	GF	GA	GD	Pts	Final result
1	B	Spain (H)	8	8	0	0	79	11	+68	24	Champions
2	A	Portugal	7	6	0	1	59	16	+43	18	Runners-up
3	B	Italy	8	6	0	2	72	23	+49	18	Third place
4	A	France	7	4	0	3	38	25	+13	12	
5	A	Switzerland	7	3	0	4	24	35	−11	9	
6	A	Andorra	7	3	0	4	22	32	−10	9	
7	B	Germany	8	4	0	4	54	41	+13	12	
8	B	England	8	2	0	6	39	67	−28	6	
9	A	Austria	6	1	1	4	14	48	−34	4	
10	B	Netherlands	7	2	0	5	40	53	−13	6	
11	B	Belgium	7	0	1	6	14	104	−90	1	

Source: WSE
(H) Hosts
