= 2021 Rink Hockey European Championship =

Tournament details
- Host country: Portugal
- City: Paredes
- Dates: 15–20 November 2021
- Teams: 6
- Venue(s): 1 (in 1 host city)

Final positions
- Champions: Spain (18th title)
- Runners-up: France

Tournament statistics
- Matches played: 17
- Goals scored: 155 (9.12 per match)
- Top scorer(s): (Portugal) Gonçalo Alves (12 goals)
- Best player(s): (France) Carlo Di Benedetto
- Best goalkeeper: (France) Baptiste Bonneau

The 2021 Rink Hockey European Championship (originally scheduled to be held in 2020, at La Roche-sur-Yon, and named EuroRink 2020), was the 54th edition of the Rink Hockey European Championship, a biennial tournament for men's national roller hockey teams of Europe organised by World Skate Europe – Rink Hockey. It took place between 15 and 20 November in Paredes, Portugal.

Spain were the defending champions and successfully defended their title, defeating France 2−1 (after extra time) in the final to claim their second consecutive title and eighteenth overall.

== Teams ==
While ten teams were set to play in the 2020 tournament, the final field of participants was reduced to six. Austria, Belgium, England and Switzerland withdrew from the competition.

Team	Appearance	Previous best performance
Andorra	5th	Sixth place (2018)
France	53rd	Runners-up (1926, 1927, 1928, 1930, 1931)
Germany	50th	Runners-up (1932, 1934)
Italy	52nd	Champions (1953, 1990, 2014)
Portugal	49th	Champions (1947, 1948, 1949, 1950, 1952, 1956, 1959, 1961, 1963, 1965, 1967, 1971, 1973, 1975, 1977, 1987, 1992, 1994, 1996, 1998, 2016)
Spain	41st	Champions (1951, 1954, 1955, 1957, 1969, 1979, 1981, 1983, 1985, 2000, 2002, 2004, 2006, 2008, 2010, 2012, 2018)

== Venue ==
Originally scheduled to take place at Le Vendéspace, all the tournament matches will instead be played at Pavilhão Multiusos de Paredes, in Paredes, Portugal.

Paredes	2021 Rink Hockey European Championship is located in Portugal
Pavilhão Multiusos de Paredes	2021 Rink Hockey European Championship is located in Portugal
Capacity: 1,300	2021 Rink Hockey European Championship is located in Portugal

== Group stage ==
Pos	Team	Pld	W	D	L	GF	GA	GD	Pts	Qualification	(Spain)	(France)	(Portugal)	(Italy)	(Germany)	(Andorra)
1	Spain	5	3	1	1	38	17	+21	10 (Note: Tied on head-to-head points (3). Head-to-head goal difference: Spain +1, France 0, Portugal −1.)	Advance to final	—	—	9–10	—	—	11–0
2	France	5	3	1	1	24	18	+6	10	Advance to final	1–3	—	5–3	—	5–2	—
3	Portugal (H)	5	3	1	1	39	19	+20	10	Advance to third place match	—	—	—	4–4	10–0	12–1
4	Italy	5	2	2	1	27	18	+9	8	Advance to third place match	4–4	5–8	—	—	4–1	10–1
5	Germany	5	1	0	4	10	31	−21	3	Advance to fifth place match	2–11	—	—	—	—	—
6	Andorra	5	0	1	4	8	43	−35	1	Advance to fifth place match	—	5–5	—	—	1–5	—

Source: WSEurope-RinkHockey.org
Rules for classification: Technical Rules of Rink-Hockey (p. 26)
(H) Hosts

== Finals ==
=== Fifth place match ===
20 November 2021
14:30

Germany	1−5	Andorra
Strieder 46'	Report	O. Antequera 5' (pen.); A. Dilme 8', 25'; G. Miquel 10'; Picanyol 23'

Pavilhão Multiusos de Paredes, Paredes
Referee: Franco Ferrari, Filippo Fronte (Italy)

=== Third place match ===
20 November 2021
17:00

Portugal	Cancelled (Note: The third place match between Portugal and Italy was cancelled after two Portuguese players tested positive to COVID-19.)	Italy
	Report

Pavilhão Multiusos de Paredes, Paredes

=== Final ===
20 November 2021
20:00

Spain	2−1 (a.e.t.)	France
Carballeira 40' (pen.); Pérez 58'	Report	B. Di Benedetto 33'

Pavilhão Multiusos de Paredes, Paredes
Referee: João Duarte, Rui Torres (Portugal)

== Final ranking ==
Rank	Team
1st place, gold medalist(s)	Spain
2nd place, silver medalist(s)	France
3 / 4	Portugal
3 / 4	Italy
5	Andorra
6	Germany
