= 2024 Roller Hockey World Cup =

2024 Men's Roller Hockey World Cup
Tournament details
- Host country: Italy
- City: Novara
- Dates: 16–22 September 2024
- Teams: 8
- Venue: Pala Igor

Final positions
- Champions: Spain (18th title)
- Runners-up: Argentina
- Third place: Italy
- Fourth place: Portugal

The 2024 Men's Roller Hockey World Cup was the 46th edition of the Roller Hockey World Cup, organised by World Skate. The tournament was held in Italy, in the city of Novara, as part of the 2024 World Skate Games.

It took place alongside the women's tournament, which followed the same format.

Spain claimed their 18th world title.

== Competition format ==
The competition is again divided into three championships:

- World Cup, which brings together the eight best teams
- Intercontinental Cup, which brings together the following eight teams
- Challenger Cup, in which all the other teams play

== World Cup ==
=== Qualified teams ===
8 teams qualified to the competition via world ranking. There were some quota places reserved to specific confederations in order to guarantee global representation in the tournament.

| Event | Location | Berths | Qualified |
|---|---|---|---|
| 2023 Roller Hockey African Championship | Egypt | 1 | Angola |
| 2024 Roller Hockey Pan American Championship | Colombia | 3 | Argentina; Chile; United States |
| 2023 Roller Hockey European Championship | Spain | 4 | France; Italy; Portugal; Spain |

In the group stage, the teams were divided into two groups of four. Argentina and Spain were seeded in the 1st pot as the top two in the rankings. Italy and Portugal were in pot 2, France and Angola in pot 3, while Chile and the United States were in pot 4. Each team plays once against every other team in their group.

The top 3 teams in each group qualify for the knockout stage, where they are joined by the two group winners of the 2024 Intercontinental Championship. The bottom team in each group will play the knockout stage of the Intercontinental Championship.

The knockout stage consists of a single-elimination tournament. The quarter-finals losers will play for the 5th to 8th placements and the semi-finals losers will play each other for the third place.

=== Group Stage ===
==== Group A ====
| Pos | Team | Pld | W | D | L | GF | GA | GD | Pts | Qualification | (Argentina) | (Portugal) | (Angola) | (United States) |
|---|---|---|---|---|---|---|---|---|---|---|---|---|---|---|
| 1 | Argentina | 3 | 2 | 1 | 0 | 20 | 7 | +13 | 7 | Quarter-Finals | — | 4–4 | 7–1 | 9–2 |
| 2 | Portugal | 3 | 2 | 1 | 0 | 18 | 6 | +12 | 7 | Quarter-Finals | | — | 4–0 | 10–2 |
| 3 | Angola | 3 | 1 | 0 | 2 | 10 | 11 | −1 | 3 | Quarter-Finals | | | — | 9–0 |
| 4 | United States | 3 | 0 | 0 | 3 | 4 | 28 | −24 | 0 | Intercontinental | | | | — |

==== Group B ====
| Pos | Team | Pld | W | D | L | GF | GA | GD | Pts | Qualification | (Spain) | (Italy) | (France) | (Chile) |
|---|---|---|---|---|---|---|---|---|---|---|---|---|---|---|
| 1 | Spain | 3 | 2 | 1 | 0 | 17 | 4 | +13 | 7 | Quarter-Finals | — | 4–3 | 1–1 | 12–0 |
| 2 | Italy | 3 | 2 | 0 | 1 | 11 | 4 | +7 | 6 | Quarter-Finals | | — | 1–0 | 7–0 |
| 3 | France | 3 | 1 | 1 | 1 | 7 | 3 | +4 | 4 | Quarter-Finals | | | — | 6–1 |
| 4 | Chile | 3 | 0 | 0 | 3 | 1 | 25 | −24 | 0 | Intercontinental | | | | — |

=== Knockout stage ===
Quarter-finals
20 september
Argentina | 4
Andorra | 1
Angola | 2
Italy | 5
Portugal | 4
France | 2
Switzerland | 0
Spain | 7

Semi-finals
21 september
Argentina | 5
Italy | 4
Portugal | 5 (1)
Spain (p) | 5 (2)

Final
22 september
Argentina | 1
Spain | 2
3rd place match
Italy | 3
Portugal | 2

==== 5th to 8th placement ====
Semi-finals
21 september
Andorra | 2
Angola | 3
France | 9
Switzerland | 2

5th place match
22 september
Angola | 2
France | 8
7th place match
Andorra | 2 (0)
Switzerland (p) | 2 (2)

== Intercontinental Cup ==
=== Qualified teams ===
8 teams qualified to the competition via world ranking. There were some quota places reserved to specific confederations in order to guarantee global representation in the tournament.

| Event | Location | Berths | Qualified |
|---|---|---|---|
| 2023 Roller Hockey African Championship | Egypt | 1 | Egypt |
| 2024 Roller Hockey Pan American Championship | Colombia | 2 | Colombia; Brazil |
| 2023 Roller Hockey Asian Championship | Taiwan | 1 | Australia |
| 2023 Roller Hockey European Championship | Spain | 4 | Switzerland; Germany; England; Andorra |

In the group stage, the teams were divided into two groups of four. Top team of each group qualifies to World Cup Quarter-finals. Remaining teams will dispute the Intercontinental Cup knockout-stage together with the last team of each group of World Cup.

=== Group Stage ===
==== Group C ====
| Pos | Team | Pld | W | D | L | GF | GA | GD | Pts | Qualification | (Switzerland) | (Colombia) | (Germany) | (Australia) |
|---|---|---|---|---|---|---|---|---|---|---|---|---|---|---|
| 1 | Switzerland | 3 | 3 | 0 | 0 | 25 | 4 | +21 | 9 | World Cup | — | 5–4 | 3–0 | 17–0 |
| 2 | Colombia | 3 | 1 | 1 | 1 | 16 | 6 | +10 | 4 | Intercontinental | | — | 1–1 | 11–0 |
| 3 | Germany | 3 | 1 | 1 | 1 | 11 | 5 | +6 | 4 | Intercontinental | | | — | 10–1 |
| 4 | Australia | 3 | 0 | 0 | 3 | 1 | 38 | −37 | 0 | Intercontinental | | | | — |

==== Group D ====
| Pos | Team | Pld | W | D | L | GF | GA | GD | Pts | Qualification | (Andorra) | (England) | (Brazil) | (Egypt) |
|---|---|---|---|---|---|---|---|---|---|---|---|---|---|---|
| 1 | Andorra | 3 | 2 | 1 | 0 | 29 | 3 | +26 | 7 | World Cup | — | 2–2 | 13–1 | 14–0 |
| 2 | England | 3 | 2 | 1 | 0 | 29 | 4 | +25 | 7 | Intercontinental | | — | 7–1 | 20–1 |
| 3 | Brazil | 3 | 1 | 0 | 2 | 9 | 22 | −13 | 3 | Intercontinental | | | — | 7–2 |
| 4 | Egypt | 3 | 0 | 0 | 3 | 3 | 41 | −38 | 0 | Intercontinental | | | | — |

=== Knockout stage ===
9th-16th places
19 september
United States | 9
Egypt | 0
Germany | 3
England | 5
Colombia | 5
Brazil | 3
Australia | 0
Chile | 11

9th-12th places
20 september
United States | 3
England | 4
Colombia | 2
Chile | 5

9th place match
22 september
England | 4
Chile | 8
11th place match
United States | 1
Colombia | 6

==== 13th to 16th placement ====
13th-16th places
20 september
Egypt | 0
Germany | 12
Brazil | 4
Australia | 3

13th place match
21 september
Germany | 7
Brazil | 3
15th place match
Egypt | 1
Australia | 3

== Challenger Cup Cup ==
=== Qualified teams ===
Eleven teams from five continents participate in the competition. Asia and Europe are the most represented continents with three national teams, ahead of Africa and America with two NT and Oceania with one NT.

| Event | Location | Berths | Qualified |
|---|---|---|---|
| 2023 Roller Hockey African Championship | Egypt | 2 | South Africa; Mozambique |
| 2024 Roller Hockey Pan American Championship | Colombia | 2 | Mexico; Uruguay |
| 2023 Roller Hockey Asian Championship | Taiwan | 3 | India; Japan; China |
| 2023 Roller Hockey Asian Championship | Taiwan | 1 | New Zealand |
| 2023 Roller Hockey European Championship | Spain | 3 | Austria; Israel; Netherlands |

In the group stage, the teams were divided into two groups. Teams of same position in each group will have a match to decide final classification (1st group E vs 1st group F, 2E vs 2F and so on).

=== Group Stage ===
==== Group E ====
| Pos | Team | Pld | W | D | L | GF | GA | GD | Pts | (Uruguay) | (Israel) | (Mozambique) | (Japan) | (Mexico) | (New Zealand) |
|---|---|---|---|---|---|---|---|---|---|---|---|---|---|---|---|
| 1 | Uruguay | 5 | 5 | 0 | 0 | 35 | 8 | +27 | 15 | — | 4–3 | 5–3 | 10–1 | 6–1 | 10–0 |
| 2 | Israel | 5 | 4 | 0 | 1 | 39 | 9 | +30 | 12 | | — | 6–4 | 11–1 | 9–0 | 10–0 |
| 3 | Mozambique | 5 | 3 | 0 | 2 | 28 | 17 | +11 | 9 | | | — | 7–2 | 5–3 | 9–1 |
| 4 | Japan | 5 | 2 | 0 | 3 | 15 | 29 | −14 | 6 | | | | — | 3–0 | 8–1 |
| 5 | Mexico | 5 | 1 | 0 | 4 | 8 | 26 | −18 | 3 | | | | | — | 4–3 |
| 6 | New Zealand | 5 | 0 | 0 | 5 | 5 | 41 | −36 | 0 | | | | | | — |

==== Group F ====
| Pos | Team | Pld | W | D | L | GF | GA | GD | Pts | (Austria) | (Netherlands) | (South Africa) | (India) | (China) |
|---|---|---|---|---|---|---|---|---|---|---|---|---|---|---|
| 1 | Austria | 4 | 4 | 0 | 0 | 61 | 9 | +52 | 12 | — | 8–6 | 9–0 | 10–3 | 34–0 |
| 2 | Netherlands | 4 | 3 | 0 | 1 | 49 | 14 | +35 | 9 | | — | 14–4 | 7–2 | 22–0 |
| 3 | South Africa | 4 | 2 | 0 | 2 | 27 | 27 | 0 | 6 | | | — | 5–4 | 18–0 |
| 4 | India | 4 | 1 | 0 | 3 | 45 | 24 | +21 | 3 | | | | — | 36–2 |
| 5 | China | 4 | 0 | 0 | 4 | 2 | 110 | −108 | 0 | | | | | — |

=== Knockout stage ===
17th-18th place match

21 september 2024

| Uruguay | 3 - 7 | Austria |
|---|---|---|
| | report |

Pala Sartorio

19th-20th place match

21 september 2024

| Israel | 6 - 9 | Netherlands |
|---|---|---|
| | report |

Pala Sartorio

21st-22nd place match

21 september 2024

| Mozambique | 5 - 4 | South Africa |
|---|---|---|
| | report |

Pala Sartorio

23rd-24th place match

21 september 2024

| Japan | 2 - 10 | India |
|---|---|---|
| | report |

Pala Sartorio

25th-26th place match

21 september 2024

| Mexico | 21 - 2 | China |
|---|---|---|
| | report |

Pala Sartorio

== Final classification ==
World Cup
| Rank | Country |
|---|---|
| Gold medal | Spain |
| Silver medal | Argentina |
| Bronze medal | Italy |
| 4th | Portugal |
| 5th | France |
| 6th | Angola |
| 7th | Switzerland |
| 8th | Andorra |

Intercontinental Cup
| Rank | Country |
|---|---|
| 9th | Chile |
| 10th | England |
| 11th | Colombia |
| 12th | United States |
| 13th | Germany |
| 14th | Brazil |
| 15th | Australia |
| 16th | Egypt |

Challenger Cup
| Rank | Country |
|---|---|
| 17th | Austria |
| 18th | Uruguay |
| 19th | Netherlands |
| 20th | Israel |
| 21st | Mozambique |
| 22nd | South Africa |
| 23rd | India |
| 24th | Japan |
| 25th | Mexico |
| 26th | China |
| 27th | New Zealand |
