= 2001 Rink Hockey World Championship =

Rink Hockey World Championship
Tournament information
- Host(s): San Juan, Argentina
- Teams: 15

Final positions
- Champions: Spain (11th title)

The 2001 Rink Hockey World Championship was the 35th edition of the Rink Hockey World Championship, held between 29 September and 7 October 2001, in San Juan, Argentina. It was disputed by 15 countries. The final watched Spain beating hosts Argentina to claim their 11th title.

== Venue ==
| San Juan | San Juan (Argentina) |
| Estadio Aldo Cantoni | San Juan (Argentina) |
| Capacity: 8,000 | San Juan (Argentina) |

== Format ==
The competition was disputed by 15 countries, divided in four groups of 3 or 4 teams each one.

Every game lasted 40 minutes, divided in 2 parts of 20 minutes.

== Matches ==
=== Group stage ===
==== Group A ====
| Team | Pld | W | D | L | GF | GA | GD | Pts |
|---|---|---|---|---|---|---|---|---|
| Argentina | 3 | 3 | 0 | 0 | 38 | 4 | +34 | 9 |
| Chile | 3 | 2 | 0 | 1 | 12 | 15 | −3 | 6 |
| Angola | 3 | 1 | 0 | 2 | 15 | 10 | +5 | 3 |
| Uruguay | 3 | 0 | 0 | 3 | 2 | 38 | −36 | 0 |

| Argentina | 7 – 4 | Angola |

| Chile | 10 – 1 | Uruguay |

| Argentina | 13 – 0 | Chile |

| Angola | 10 – 1 | Uruguay |

| Argentina | 18 – 0 | Uruguay |

| Chile | 2 – 1 | Angola |

==== Group B ====
| Team | Pld | W | D | L | GF | GA | GD | Pts |
|---|---|---|---|---|---|---|---|---|
| Spain | 2 | 2 | 0 | 0 | 13 | 2 | +11 | 6 |
| Mozambique | 2 | 1 | 0 | 1 | 5 | 13 | −8 | 3 |
| Switzerland | 2 | 0 | 0 | 2 | 6 | 9 | −3 | 0 |

| Spain | 4 – 2 | Switzerland |

| Mozambique | 5 – 4 | Switzerland |

| Spain | 9 – 0 | Mozambique |

==== Group C ====
| Team | Pld | W | D | L | GF | GA | GD | Pts |
|---|---|---|---|---|---|---|---|---|
| Portugal | 3 | 3 | 0 | 0 | 32 | 0 | +32 | 9 |
| France | 3 | 2 | 0 | 1 | 11 | 13 | −2 | 6 |
| Germany | 3 | 1 | 0 | 2 | 5 | 15 | −10 | 3 |
| Netherlands | 3 | 0 | 0 | 3 | 3 | 23 | −20 | 0 |

| Portugal | 4 – 0 | Germany |

| France | 3 – 0 | Netherlands |

| Portugal | 12 – 0 | France |

| Germany | 4 – 3 | Netherlands |

| Portugal | 16 – 0 | Netherlands |

| France | 8 – 1 | Germany |

==== Group D ====
| Team | Pld | W | D | L | GF | GA | GD | Pts |
|---|---|---|---|---|---|---|---|---|
| Italy | 3 | 3 | 0 | 0 | 27 | 2 | +25 | 9 |
| Brazil | 3 | 2 | 0 | 1 | 14 | 4 | +10 | 6 |
| United States | 3 | 1 | 0 | 2 | 5 | 24 | −19 | 3 |
| England | 3 | 0 | 0 | 3 | 0 | 16 | −16 | 0 |

| Italy | 17 – 1 | United States |

| Brazil | 6 – 0 | England |

| Italy | 2 – 1 | Brazil |

| United States | 2 – 0 | England |

| Italy | 8 – 0 | England |

| Brazil | 7 – 2 | United States |

=== Championship Knockout stage ===
Quarter-finals
Italy | 2
France | 1
Spain | 15
Chile | 0
Portugal | 5
Brazil | 0
Argentina | 10
Mozambique | 1

Semi-finals
Italy | 1
Spain | 3
Argentina | 3
Portugal | 2

Final
Spain | 3
Argentina | 2
Third place
Italy | 5
Portugal | 3

=== 5th place bracket ===
Semi-finals
France | 4
Chile | 3
Brazil | 7
Mozambique | 0

Fifth place
France | 7
Brazil | 5
Seventh place
Chile | 3
Mozambique | 1

=== 9th to 16th place Knockout stage ===
Quarter-finals
Germany | 7
England | 2
Angola | -
Bye | -
United States | 2
Netherlands | 0
Switzerland | 20
Uruguay | 0

Ninth place
Germany | 6
Angola | 8
United States | 1
Switzerland | 3

Final
Angola | 4
Switzerland | 9
Eleventh place
Germany | 3
United States | 5

=== 13th place bracket ===
Semi-finals
Uruguay | 2
Netherlands | 4
England | -
Bye | -

Final
England | 2
Netherlands | 4

== Final standings ==
| Place | Team |
|---|---|
| 1 | Spain |
| 2 | Argentina |
| 3 | Italy |
| 4 | Portugal |
| 5 | France |
| 6 | Brazil |
| 7 | Chile |
| 8 | Mozambique |
| 9 | Switzerland |
| 10 | Angola |
| 11 | United States |
| 12 | Germany |
| 13 | Netherlands |
| 14 | England |
| 15 | Uruguay |

2001 Rink Hockey World Championship

Spain
Eleventh title
