= 1958 Roller Hockey World Cup =

Roller Hockey Men's World Championships

Tournament details
- Host country: Portugal
- Dates: 26 May 1958– 2 June 1958
- Teams: 10 (from 1 confederation)
- Venue(s): 1 (in 1 host city)

Final positions
- Champions: Portugal (7th title)
- Runners-up: Spain
- Third place: Italy
- Fourth place: Netherlands

Tournament statistics
- Matches played: 45
- Goals scored: 348 (7.73 per match)

The 1958 Roller Hockey World Cup was the thirteenth roller hockey world cup, organized by the Fédération Internationale de Patinage a Roulettes (now under the name of Fédération Internationale de Roller Sports). It was contested by 10 national teams (all from Europe) and marks the first time that a world championship was not considered a European championship. All the games were played in the city of Porto, in Portugal, the chosen city to host the World Cup.

== Results ==
Team	FRG	NED	ITA	SWI	ESP	POR	DEN	FRA	ENG	BEL
West Germany										
Netherlands	5–4									
Italy	4–2	5–0								
Switzerland	2–0	1–4	2–3							
Spain	6–2	9–1	2–2	9–1						
Portugal	8–1	14–0	3–1	6–1	2–2					
Denmark	0–10	1–12	0–11	0–6	0–21	1–14				
France	2–3	1–3	0–5	2–2	0–9	0–6	13–1			
England	5–3	1–3	1–4	4–1	3–10	0–6	18–1	11–2		
Belgium	4–5	1–6	0–3	2–0	2–2	1–2	9–0	5–2	2–3	

== Standings ==
Team	Pld	W	D	L	GF	GA	GD	Pts
(gold) Portugal (C)	9	8	1	0	61	7	+54	17
(silver) Spain	9	6	3	0	70	13	+57	15
(bronze) Italy	9	7	1	1	38	10	+28	15
Netherlands	9	6	0	3	34	37	−3	12
England	9	5	0	4	46	32	+14	10
Belgium	9	3	1	5	26	23	+3	7
West Germany	9	3	0	6	30	36	−6	6
Switzerland	9	2	1	6	16	30	−14	5
France	9	1	1	7	22	45	−23	3
Denmark	9	0	0	9	5	120	−115	0

(C) 1958 World Champion

== See also ==
- FIRS Roller Hockey World Cup
