= 1964 Roller Hockey World Cup =

Roller Hockey Men's World Championships

Tournament details
- Host country: Spain
- Dates: 23 May 1964– 31 May 1964
- Teams: 10 (from 3 confederations)
- Venue(s): 1 (in 1 host city)

Final positions
- Champions: Spain (4th title)
- Runners-up: Portugal
- Third place: Italy
- Fourth place: Netherlands

Tournament statistics
- Matches played: 45
- Goals scored: 326 (7.24 per match)

The 1964 Roller Hockey World Cup was the sixteenth roller hockey world cup, organized by the Fédération Internationale de Patinage a Roulettes (now under the name of Fédération Internationale de Roller Sports). It was contested by 10 national teams (7 from Europe, 2 from South America and 1 from Asia, for the first time ever). All the games were played in the city of Barcelona, in Spain, the chosen city to host the World Cup.

== Results ==
Team	JPN	ESP	POR	NED	URU	ENG	FRG	ITA	SWI	ARG
Japan										
Spain	34–0									
Portugal	28–0	0–1								
Netherlands	12–0	0–4	2–2							
Uruguay	7–1	1–2	0–3	2–6						
England	13–1	0–7	0–11	0–4	2–1					
West Germany	11–1	2–7	0–2	2–3	3–0	3–1				
Italy	12–0	1–2	0–4	2–1	1–1	8–0	1–2			
Switzerland	16–0	0–4	0–7	0–2	5–2	4–3	5–1	2–3		
Argentina	20–0	0–4	4–7	2–0	1–1	1–2	3–2	1–2	3–2	

== Standings ==
Team	Pld	W	D	L	GF	GA	GD	Pts
(gold) Spain (C)	9	9	0	0	65	3	+62	18
(silver) Portugal	9	7	1	1	64	7	+57	15
(bronze) Italy	9	5	1	3	36	11	+25	11
Netherlands	9	5	1	3	30	14	+16	11
Argentina	9	4	1	4	33	21	+12	9
Switzerland	9	4	0	5	34	25	+9	8
West Germany	9	4	0	5	25	23	+2	8
England	9	3	0	6	21	40	−19	6
Uruguay	9	1	2	6	15	20	−5	4
Japan	9	0	0	9	3	162	−159	0

(C) 1964 World Champion

== See also ==
- FIRS Roller Hockey World Cup
