= 1950 Roller Hockey World Cup =

Roller Hockey Men's World Championships

Tournament details
- Host country: Italy
- Dates: 27 May 1950– 2 June 1950
- Teams: 10 (from 2 confederations)
- Venue(s): 1 (in 1 host city)

Final positions
- Champions: Portugal (4th title)
- Runners-up: Italy
- Third place: Switzerland
- Fourth place: Spain

Tournament statistics
- Matches played: 46
- Goals scored: 289 (6.28 per match)

The 1950 Roller Hockey World Cup was the sixth roller hockey world cup, organized by the Fédération Internationale de Patinage a Roulettes (now under the name of Fédération Internationale de Roller Sports). It was contested by 10 national teams (9 from Europe and 1 from Africa) and it is also considered the 1950 European Roller Hockey Championship (despite the presence of Egypt). All the games were played in the city of Milan, in Italy, the chosen city to host the World Cup. It was the first edition decided in a final game, which saw Portugal defeating Italy by 4–0.

== Results ==
Team	EGY	NED	BEL	ENG	FRA	FRG	ESP	SWI	ITA	POR
Egypt										
Netherlands	5–1									
Belgium	7–0	3–2								
England	12–1	5–1	4–1							
France	2–2	1–0	2–1	5–3						
West Germany	11–0	7–2	2–0	3–2	3–3					
Spain	11–1	5–1	3–4	2–1	8–0	4–2				
Switzerland	9–0	3–1	2–1	4–2	5–3	4–1	1–1			
Italy	14–0	9–1	7–1	5–1	4–2	3–0	4–0	6–1		
Portugal	16–0	2–0	2–1	2–0	8–2	6–1	6–0	6–2	4–1	

== Standings ==
Team	Pld	W	D	L	GF	GA	GD	Pts	Qualification
Portugal	9	9	0	0	52	7	+45	18	Advancing to final
Italy	9	8	0	1	52	10	+42	16	Advancing to final
(bronze) Switzerland	9	6	1	2	33	21	+12	13	
Spain	9	5	1	3	34	20	+14	11	
West Germany	9	4	1	4	30	24	+6	9	
France	9	3	2	4	20	33	−13	8	
England	9	3	0	6	27	24	+3	6	
Belgium	9	3	0	6	19	23	−4	6	
Netherlands	9	1	0	8	13	36	−23	2	
Egypt	9	0	1	8	5	87	−82	1	

=== Final ===
June 2nd, 1950
June 2nd, 1950	Portugal (gold)	4 – 0	(silver) Italy	Milan, Italy

== See also ==
- FIRS Roller Hockey World Cup
- CERH European Roller Hockey Championship
