= 1952 Roller Hockey World Cup =

Roller Hockey Men's World Championships

Tournament details
- Host country: Portugal
- Dates: 28 June 1952– 7 July 1952
- Teams: 10 (from 2 confederations)
- Venue(s): 1 (in 1 host city)

Final positions
- Champions: Portugal (5th title)
- Runners-up: Italy
- Third place: Spain
- Fourth place: Belgium

Tournament statistics
- Matches played: 46
- Goals scored: 270 (5.87 per match)

The 1952 Roller Hockey World Cup was the eighth roller hockey world cup, organized by the Fédération Internationale de Patinage a Roulettes (now under the name of Fédération Internationale de Roller Sports). It was contested by 10 national teams (9 from Europe and 1 from Africa) and it is also considered the 1952 European Roller Hockey Championship (despite the presence of Egypt). All the games were played in the city of Porto, in Portugal, the chosen city to host the World Cup.

== Results ==
Team	FRA	BEL	ENG	NED	EGY	ITA	ESP	SWI	POR	DEN
France										
Belgium	5–2									
England	1–1	0–5								
Netherlands	4–2	1–2	2–1							
Egypt	0–2	0–3	0–9	0–6						
Italy	2–3	5–1	2–1	4–2	12–1					
Spain	3–0	2–1	1–1	6–1	4–0	2–3				
Switzerland	1–3	1–3	1–4	1–1	7–0	2–4	1–3			
Portugal	9–0	2–1	9–0	11–1	13–0	1–3	2–1	7–1		
Denmark	0–7	0–7	0–6	0–9	0–6	0–9	0–7	1–5	0–13	

== Standings ==
Team	Pld	W	D	L	GF	GA	GD	Pts	Qualification
Portugal	9	8	0	1	67	7	+60	16	Advancing to final
Italy	9	8	0	1	44	13	+31	16	Advancing to final
(bronze) Spain	9	6	1	2	29	9	+20	13	
Belgium	9	6	0	3	28	13	+15	12	
Netherlands	9	4	1	4	27	27	0	9	
France	9	4	1	4	20	25	−5	9	
England	9	3	2	4	23	21	+2	8	
Switzerland	9	2	1	6	20	26	−6	5	
Egypt	9	1	0	8	7	56	−49	2	
Denmark	9	0	0	9	1	69	−68	0	

=== Final ===
July 7th, 1952
July 7th, 1952	Portugal (gold)	4 – 0	(silver) Italy	Porto, Portugal

== See also ==
- FIRS Roller Hockey World Cup
- CERH European Roller Hockey Championship
