= 1962 Roller Hockey World Cup =

Roller Hockey Men's World Championships

Tournament details
- Host country: Chile
- Dates: 28 March 1962– 5 April 1962
- Teams: 10 (from 2 confederations)
- Venue(s): 1 (in 1 host city)

Final positions
- Champions: Portugal (9th title)
- Runners-up: Italy
- Third place: Spain
- Fourth place: Switzerland

Tournament statistics
- Matches played: 45
- Goals scored: 270 (6 per match)

The 1962 Roller Hockey World Cup was the fifteenth roller hockey world cup, organized by the Fédération Internationale de Patinage a Roulettes (now under the name of Fédération Internationale de Roller Sports). It was contested by 10 national teams (6 from Europe and 4 from South America). All the games were played in the city of Santiago, in Chile, the chosen city to host the World Cup.

== Results ==
Team	BRA	CHI	ARG	ITA	URU	POR	SWI	NED	ESP	FRG
Brazil										
Chile	4–1									
Argentina	8–3	3–2								
Italy	6–3	4–1	3–0							
Uruguay	1–0	3–2	0–4	2–4						
Portugal	11–2	10–2	9–1	2–2	10–1					
Switzerland	4–4	1–8	5–1	3–3	4–3	0–5				
Netherlands	4–2	3–3	1–2	1–2	1–1	1–7	3–7			
Spain	7–0	2–1	4–0	1–2	2–1	0–0	5–2	5–2		
West Germany	4–6	3–2	0–2	2–2	3–4	0–6	2–4	1–5	0–7	

== Standings ==
Team	Pld	W	D	L	GF	GA	GD	Pts
(gold) Portugal (C)	9	7	2	0	60	9	+51	16
(silver) Italy	9	6	3	0	28	15	+13	15
(bronze) Spain	9	7	1	1	33	8	+25	15
Switzerland	9	4	2	3	30	34	−4	10
Argentina	9	5	0	4	21	27	−6	10
Uruguay	9	3	1	5	16	30	−14	7
Netherlands	9	2	2	5	21	30	−9	6
Chile	9	2	1	6	25	30	−5	5
Brazil	9	1	1	7	21	49	−28	3
West Germany	9	1	1	7	15	38	−23	3

(C) 1962 World Champion

== See also ==
- FIRS Roller Hockey World Cup
