= 1960 Roller Hockey World Cup =

Roller Hockey Men's World Championships

Tournament details
- Host country: Spain
- Dates: 7 May 1960– 15 May 1960
- Teams: 10 (from 3 confederations)
- Venue(s): 1 (in 1 host city)

Final positions
- Champions: Portugal (8th title)
- Runners-up: Spain
- Third place: Argentina
- Fourth place: Italy

Tournament statistics
- Matches played: 45
- Goals scored: 310 (6.89 per match)

The 1960 Roller Hockey World Cup was the fourteenth roller hockey world cup, organized by the Fédération Internationale de Patinage a Roulettes (now under the name of Fédération Internationale de Roller Sports). It was contested by 10 national teams (8 from Europe, 1 from Africa and 1 from South America). All the games were played in the city of Madrid, in Spain, the chosen city to host the World Cup.

== Results ==
Team	ITA	FRG	ESP	BEL	ENG	POR	UAR	NED	ARG	FRA
Italy										
West Germany	2–4									
Spain	6–1	4–1								
Belgium	4–8	3–1	1–5							
England	3–5	5–1	0–13	5–0						
Portugal	3–2	8–3	3–1	5–1	10–0					
United Arab Republic	2–7	0–11	0–12	0–3	2–5	0–14				
Netherlands	3–7	5–1	0–8	3–1	3–3	1–7	8–2			
Argentina	4–3	4–1	1–3	3–2	4–2	1–8	10–1	5–2		
France	0–6	3–5	1–4	0–2	0–2	0–3	3–1	1–5	2–2	

== Standings ==
Team	Pld	W	D	L	GF	GA	GD	Pts
(gold) Portugal (C)	9	9	0	0	61	9	+52	18
(silver) Spain	9	8	0	1	56	8	+48	16
(bronze) Argentina	9	6	1	2	34	24	+10	13
Italy	9	6	0	3	43	27	+16	12
Netherlands	9	4	1	4	30	35	−5	9
England	9	4	1	4	25	38	−13	9
Belgium	9	3	0	6	17	30	−13	6
West Germany	9	2	0	7	26	36	−10	4
France	9	1	1	7	10	30	−20	3
United Arab Republic	9	0	0	9	8	73	−65	0

(C) 1960 World Champion

== See also ==
- FIRS Roller Hockey World Cup
