= 1948 Roller Hockey World Cup =

Roller Hockey Men's World Championships

Tournament details
- Host country: Switzerland
- Dates: 24 March 1948– 30 March 1948
- Teams: 9 (from 2 confederations)
- Venue(s): 1 (in 1 host city)

Final positions
- Champions: Portugal (2nd title)
- Runners-up: England
- Third place: Italy
- Fourth place: Spain

Tournament statistics
- Matches played: 36
- Goals scored: 285 (7.92 per match)

The 1948 Roller Hockey World Cup was the fourth roller hockey world cup, organized by the Fédération Internationale de Patinage a Roulettes (now under the name of Fédération Internationale de Roller Sports). It was contested by 9 national teams (8 from Europe and 1 from Africa) and it is also considered the 1948 European Roller Hockey Championship (despite the presence of Egypt) and the 1948 Montreux Nations Cup. All the games were played in the city of Montreux, in Switzerland, the chosen city to host the World Cup.

== Results ==
Team	NED	EGY	FRA	SWI	BEL	ESP	ITA	ENG	POR
Netherlands									
Egypt	5–0								
France	8–0	5–1							
Switzerland	9–0	7–0	5–2						
Belgium	15–0	2–0	2–0	3–1					
Spain	16–0	14–0	5–0	6–3	4–2				
Italy	15–0	7–0	7–3	8–3	8–2	3–0			
England	17–0	8–1	3–3	5–1	5–1	2–2	3–2		
Portugal	15–0	13–0	6–0	5–4	10–0	3–1	3–1	1–2	

== Standings ==
Team	Pld	W	D	L	GF	GA	GD	Pts
(gold) Portugal (C)	8	7	0	1	56	8	+48	14
(silver) England	8	6	2	0	45	11	+34	14
(bronze) Italy	8	6	0	2	48	14	+34	12
Spain	8	5	1	2	48	13	+35	11
Belgium	8	4	0	4	27	25	+2	8
Switzerland	8	3	0	5	33	29	+4	6
France	8	2	1	5	21	29	−8	5
Egypt	8	1	0	7	7	56	−49	2
Netherlands	8	0	0	8	0	100	−100	0

(C) 1948 World Champion

== See also ==
- FIRS Roller Hockey World Cup
- CERH European Roller Hockey Championship
- Montreux Nations Cup
