= 1953 Roller Hockey World Cup =

Roller Hockey Men's World Championships

Tournament details
- Host country: Switzerland
- Dates: 29 May 1953– 6 June 1953
- Teams: 13 (from 3 confederations)
- Venue(s): 1 (in 1 host city)

Final positions
- Champions: Italy (1st title)
- Runners-up: Portugal
- Third place: Spain
- Fourth place: Switzerland

Tournament statistics
- Matches played: 46
- Goals scored: 282 (6.13 per match)

The 1953 Roller Hockey World Cup was the ninth roller hockey world cup, organized by the Fédération Internationale de Patinage a Roulettes (now under the name of Fédération Internationale de Roller Sports). It was contested by 13 national teams (11 from Europe, 1 from Africa and for the first time, 1 from South America) and it is also considered the 1953 European Roller Hockey Championship (despite the presences of Egypt and Brazil). All the games were played in the city of Geneva, in Switzerland, the chosen city to host the World Cup. Also for the first time there was a two-group stage, with the first two teams from each group qualifying to a final-four group.

== Group stage ==
=== Group A ===
Team	POR	ESP	ENG	NED	BRA	IRE	EGY
Portugal							
Spain	1–1						
England	0–3	1–3					
Netherlands	2–7	2–2	2–4				
Brazil	0–8	0–7	1–7	4–6			
Ireland	0–10	1–10	1–9	0–5	2–2		
Egypt	1–4	0–11	3–11	1–5	2–4	2–4	

Team	Pld	W	D	L	GF	GA	GD	Pts	Qualification
Portugal	6	5	1	0	33	4	+29	11	Advancing to final-four
Spain	6	4	2	0	34	5	+29	10	Advancing to final-four
England	6	4	0	2	32	13	+19	8	
Netherlands	6	3	1	2	22	18	+4	7	
Brazil	6	1	1	4	11	32	−21	3	
Ireland	6	1	1	4	8	38	−30	3	
Egypt	6	0	0	6	9	39	−30	0	

=== Group B ===
Team	ITA	SWI	BEL	FRG	FRA	DEN
Italy						
Switzerland	2–2					
Belgium	1–2	4–0				
West Germany	3–6	1–4	4–0			
France	1–3	1–2	0–5	1–3		
Denmark	1–13	0–8	0–12	3–8	2–3	

Team	Pld	W	D	L	GF	GA	GD	Pts	Qualification
Italy	5	4	1	0	26	8	+18	9	Advancing to final-four
Switzerland	5	3	1	1	16	8	+8	7	Advancing to final-four
Belgium	5	3	0	2	22	6	+16	6	
West Germany	5	3	0	2	19	14	+5	6	
France	5	1	0	4	6	15	−9	2	
Denmark	5	0	0	5	6	44	−38	0	

== Final phase ==
=== 4th to 12th play-offs ===
11th place play-off

Ireland (Republic of Ireland)	5 – 1	Denmark	Geneva, Switzerland

9th place play-off

France	1 – 1	Brazil	Geneva, Switzerland

7th place play-off

West Germany	4 – 1	Netherlands	Geneva, Switzerland

5th place play-off

Belgium	2 – 1	England	Geneva, Switzerland

- France classified in 9th place, by greater goal average in the group phase.

=== Final-four ===
Pos	Team	Pld	W	D	L	GF	GA	GD	Pts	ITA	POR	ESP	SWI
1st place, gold medalist(s)	Italy (C)	3	3	0	0	8	2	+6	6				
2nd place, silver medalist(s)	Portugal	3	2	0	1	8	5	+3	4	0–3			
3rd place, bronze medalist(s)	Spain	3	1	0	2	3	4	−1	2	0–1	1–2		
4	Switzerland	3	0	0	3	3	11	−8	0	2–4	1–6	0–1	

(C) 1953 World Champion

== Standings ==
	Team
1st place, gold medalist(s)	Italy
2nd place, silver medalist(s)	Portugal
3rd place, bronze medalist(s)	Spain
4th	Switzerland
5th	Belgium
6th	England
7th	West Germany
8th	Netherlands
9th	France
10th	Brazil
11th	Ireland
12th	Denmark
13th	Egypt

== See also ==
- FIRS Roller Hockey World Cup
- CERH European Roller Hockey Championship
