= 2017 FIRS Men's Roller Hockey World Cup =

Tournament details
- Host country: China
- City: Nanjing
- Dates: 3–9 September 2017
- Teams: 23 (from 4 confederations)
- Venue: 1 (in 1 host city)

Final positions
- Champions: Spain (17th title)
- Runners-up: Portugal
- Third place: Argentina
- Fourth place: Italy

Tournament statistics
- Top scorer: (Angola) Mustang (28 goals)

The 2017 FIRS Men's Roller Hockey World Cup was the 43rd edition of the Roller Hockey World Cup, organised by the Fédération Internationale de Roller Sports (FIRS). The tournament was held for the first time in China, in the city of Nanjing, from 3 to 9 September 2017, as part of the 2017 World Roller Games. Spain won his 17th title, defeating Portugal, who returned to the final, after an eleven years absence, in penalties.

== Competition format ==
During the previous edition of the World Cup, the FIRS determined to end with the celebration of two different tournaments for divisions A and B, and merged all competitions in a whole event integrated in the World Roller Games. Finally the FIRS divided the 23 participant teams into three different competitions.

=== World Championship ===
The eight first ranked teams were divided into two groups. The three first qualified teams of each group will join the quarterfinals of the competition with the two group winners of the FIRS Cup groups.

The last qualified team of each group will be dropped to the quarterfinals of the FIRS Cup.

=== FIRS Cup ===
The eight teams ranked between 9th and 16th were also divided into two groups. The two group winners will join the quarterfinals of the World Championship while the six remaining teams will play the quarterfinals of the competition with the two teams dropped from the World Championship.

=== Confederations Cup ===
The remaining teams played the Confederations Cup. Initially the teams were divided into two groups with the two first qualified teams from each group joining a final stage, consisting in a round-robin tournament. After Egypt rellocation, the format was changed for just one group in a single roun-robin format.

== Teams ==
The 23 teams were divided into three competitions according to their positions in the 2015 FIRS Men's Roller Hockey World Cup. The Division B was renamed as FIRS Cup and the new Division C was named as Confederations Cup.

The two top seeded teams were drawn in different groups. The draw was held in Barcelona on 5 July 2017.

After the withdrawal of Brazil, Egypt moved to FIRS Cup, and the confederation cup was redesigned into a single round-robin tournament.

World Championship		FIRS Cup		Confederations Cup	
Rank	Team	Rank	Team	Rank	Team
1	Argentina	9	Angola	17	~~Egypt~~
2	Spain	10	~~Brazil~~		Australia
3	Portugal	11	Austria		Chinese Taipei
4	Germany	12	Colombia		India
5	Italy	13	Netherlands		Israel
6	France	14	United States		Japan
7	Mozambique	15	South Africa		New Zealand
8	Chile	16	Macau		
		17	Egypt		

== World Championship ==
=== Group A ===
Pos	Team	Pld	W	D	L	GF	GA	GD	Pts	Qualification	(Argentina)	(Italy)	(Portugal)	(France)
1	Argentina	3	3	0	0	16	5	+11	9	Qualification to quarterfinals	—	6–1	—	5–2
2	Italy	3	2	0	1	11	10	+1	6	Qualification to quarterfinals	—	—	4–2	—
3	Portugal	3	1	0	2	10	14	−4	3	Qualification to quarterfinals	2–5	—	—	6–5
4	France	3	0	0	3	9	17	−8	0	Dropped to FIRS Cup quarterfinals	—	2–6	—	—

Source: FIRS

=== Group B ===
Pos	Team	Pld	W	D	L	GF	GA	GD	Pts	Qualification	(Spain)	(Mozambique)	(Chile)	(Germany)
1	Spain	3	3	0	0	15	7	+8	9	Qualification to quarterfinals	—	3–2	4–3	—
2	Mozambique	3	2	0	1	14	9	+5	6	Qualification to quarterfinals	—	—	—	7–3
3	Chile	3	1	0	2	13	12	+1	3	Qualification to quarterfinals	—	3–5	—	7–3
4	Germany	3	0	0	3	8	22	−14	0	Dropped to FIRS Cup quarterfinals	2–8	—	—	—

Source: FIRS

=== Knockout stage ===
Quarterfinals
7 September
Mozambique	2
Portugal	6
7 September
Angola	3
Argentina (a.e.t.)	4
7 September
Spain	5
Colombia	1
7 September
Chile	3 (0)
Italy (p)	3 (3)

Semifinals
8 September
Portugal	5
Argentina	0
8 September
Spain	4
Italy	0

Final
9 September
Portugal	3 (1)
Spain (p)	3 (2)
Third place
9 September
Argentina	4
Italy	2

Source: FIRS

=== 5th to 8th position bracket ===
Semifinals
8 September
Mozambique	3
Angola	6
8 September
Colombia (a.e.t.)	3
Chile	2

5th position game
9 September
Angola	5
Colombia	1
7th position game
9 September
Mozambique	7
Chile (a.e.t.)	9

== FIRS Cup ==
=== Group A ===
Pos	Team	Pld	W	D	L	GF	GA	GD	Pts	Qualification	(Colombia)	(Austria)	(South Africa)	(Macau)
1	Colombia	3	3	0	0	40	1	+39	9	Qualification to World Championship quarterfinals	—	6–1	19–0	—
2	Austria	3	2	0	1	19	12	+7	6	Qualification to quarterfinals	—	—	5–3	—
3	South Africa	3	0	1	2	11	32	−21	1	Qualification to quarterfinals	—	—	—	8–8
4	Macau	3	0	1	2	11	36	−25	1	Qualification to quarterfinals	0–15	3–13	—	—

Source: FIRS

=== Group B ===
Brazil resigned to play the competition after the draw of the groups. Egypt occupied its berth.

Pos	Team	Pld	W	D	L	GF	GA	GD	Pts	Qualification	(Angola)	(Netherlands)	(Egypt)	(United States)
1	Angola	3	3	0	0	74	3	+71	9	Qualification to World Championship quarterfinals	—	18–1	24–1	—
2	Netherlands	3	2	0	1	17	22	−5	6	Qualification to quarterfinals	—	—	8–0	—
3	Egypt	3	1	0	2	5	34	−29	3	Qualification to quarterfinals	—	—	—	4–2
4	United States	3	0	0	3	7	44	−37	0	Qualification to quarterfinals	1–32	4–8	—	—

Source: FIRS

=== Knockout stage ===
Quarterfinals
7 September
Netherlands	5
South Africa	2
7 September
United States	6
France	12
7 September
Germany	29
Macau	1
7 September
Egypt	5
Austria	7

Semifinals
8 September
Netherlands	2
France	9
8 September
Germany	8
Austria	1

9th position game
9 September
France	6
Germany	4
11th position game
9 September
Netherlands	5
Austria	3

Source: FIRS

=== 13th to 16th position bracket ===
Semifinals
8 September
South Africa	6
United States	3
8 September
Macau (a.e.t.)	10
Egypt	9

13th position game
9 September
South Africa	7
Macau	2
15th position game
9 September
United States	6
Egypt	1

== Confederations Cup ==
After the reallocation of Egypt to the FIRS Cup, the competition system was modified to a single round-robin group.

Pos	Team	Pld	W	D	L	GF	GA	GD	Pts	(Israel)	(India)	(Japan)	(Australia)	(Chinese Taipei)	(New Zealand)
1	Israel	5	4	1	0	51	14	+37	13	—	8–2	6–1	—	—	16–3
2	India	5	3	1	1	30	22	+8	10	—	—	8–3	6–6	5–2	—
3	Japan	5	3	0	2	18	19	−1	9	—	—	—	4–2	5–2	5–1
4	Australia	5	2	2	1	24	17	+7	8	5–5	—	—	—	6–0	—
5	Chinese Taipei	5	1	0	4	13	37	−24	3	3–16	—	—	—	—	6–5
6	New Zealand	5	0	0	5	14	41	−27	0	—	3–9	—	2–5	—	—

Source: FIRS

== Final standings ==
Pos.	Team	G	Pld	W	D	L	Pts	GF	GA	GD
1	Spain	B	6	5	1	0	16	27	11	+16
2	Portugal	A	6	3	1	2	10	24	19	+5
3	Argentina	A	6	5	0	1	15	24	15	+9
4	Italy	A	6	2	1	3	7	16	17	−1
Played the knockout stage
5	Angola	B^{F}	6	5	0	1	15	88	11	+77
6	Colombia	A^{F}	6	4	0	2	12	45	9	+36
7	Chile	B	6	2	1	3	7	27	25	+2
8	Mozambique	B	6	2	0	4	6	26	30	−4
Played the knockout stage of the FIRS Cup
9	France	A^{W}	6	3	0	3	9	36	29	+7
10	Germany	B^{W}	6	2	0	4	6	49	30	+19
11	Netherlands	A	6	4	0	2	12	29	36	−7
12	Austria	B	6	3	0	3	9	30	30	0
13	South Africa	A	6	2	1	3	7	26	42	−16
14	Macau	A	6	1	1	4	4	24	82	−58
15	United States	B	6	1	0	5	3	22	63	−41
16	Egypt	B	6	1	0	5	3	20	57	−37
Played the Confederation Cup
17	Israel	—	5	4	1	0	13	51	14	+37
18	India	—	5	3	1	1	10	30	22	+8
19	Japan	—	5	3	0	2	9	18	19	−1
20	Australia	—	5	2	2	1	8	24	17	+7
21	Chinese Taipei	—	5	1	0	4	3	13	37	−24
22	New Zealand	—	5	0	0	5	0	14	41	−27
