= 66th Nations Cup =

2015 65th Nations Cup
Montreux Tournament

Tournament details
- Host country: Switzerland
- Dates: 1–5 April
- Teams: 8 (from 2 confederations)

Final positions
- Champions: Portugal (18th title)

Tournament statistics
- Matches played: 20
- Goals scored: 1 (0.05 per match)

The 66th Nations Cup in roller hockey was the 2015 edition of the Nations Cup. The competition was hosted as normal in Montreux from 1 to 5 April 2015.

== Group stage ==
=== Group A ===
Team	Pld	W	D	L	GF	GA	GD	Pts
Spain	3	3	0	0	12	4	+8	9
Portugal	3	2	0	1	13	2	+11	6
Germany	3	1	0	2	4	9	-5	3
Switzerland	3	0	0	3	2	16	-14	0

1 April 2015; 21:00 CET
1 April 2015; 21:00 CET	Portugal	8 – 0	Switzerland	Le Pierrier - Clarens, Montreux
1 April 2015; 21:00 CET	1-0 Hélder Nunes PwP 5x4 7' 1st Hf; 2-0 Gonçalo Alves 13' 1st Hf; 3-0 Gonçalo Alves 14' 1st Hf; 4-0 Hélder Nunes GP 19'13s 1st Hf; 5-0 José "Rafa" Costa LD Blue Card 2' 2nd Hf; 6-0 João Souto 5' 2nd Hf; 7-0 João Souto 7' 2nd Hf; 8-0 João Rodrigues 17' 2nd Hf			Le Pierrier - Clarens, Montreux

1 April 2015
22:30 CET
Spain
4 – 2
Germany
Le Pierrier - Clarens, Montreux
1-0 Cristian Rodrigues 12' 1st Hf
2-0 Cristian Rodrigues 17' 1st Hf

3-0 Antonio "Toni" Perez 9' 2nd Hf
4-2 Antonio "Toni" Perez 17' 2nd Hf

3-1 Lucas Karschau LD 10ªF 12' 2nd Hf
3-2 Lucas Karschau 17' 2nd Hf

2 April 2015; 19:00 CET
2 April 2015; 19:00 CET	Spain	7-2	Switzerland	Le Pierrier - Clarens, Montreux
2 April 2015; 19:00 CET	1-0 Xavi Barroso 17' 1st Hf; 2-0 Cristian Rodriguez 1' 2nd Hf; 3-0 Àlex Rodríguez 2' 2nd Hf; 4-0 Antonio "Toni" Perez 12' 2nd Hf; 5-1 Sergio "Sergi" Miras 16' 2nd Hf; 6-1 Sergio "Sergi" Miras 17' 2nd Hf; 7-2 Sergio "Sergi" Miras GP 19' 2nd Hf		4-1 Pascal Kissling 14' 2nd Hf; 6-2 Pascal Kissling 18' 2nd Hf	Le Pierrier - Clarens, Montreux

2 April 2015; 20:30 CET
2 April 2015; 20:30 CET	Portugal	5-1	Germany	Le Pierrier - Clarens, Montreux
2 April 2015; 20:30 CET	1-0 João Rodrigues 4' 1st Hf; 2-0 Gonçalo Alves 10' 1st Hf; 3-0 Hélder Nunes 14' 1st Hf; 4-0 João Rodrigues 9' 2nd Hf; 5-0 Gonçalo Alves rec. GP 16' 2nd Hf		5-1 Lucas Karschau 18' 2nd Hf	Le Pierrier - Clarens, Montreux

3 April 2015; 17:30 CET
3 April 2015; 17:30 CET	Germany	1-0	Switzerland	Le Pierrier - Clarens, Montreux
3 April 2015; 17:30 CET	1-0 Lucas Karschau LD AZUL 19' 2nd Hf			Le Pierrier - Clarens, Montreux

3 April 2015; 20:30 CET
3 April 2015; 20:30 CET	Portugal	0-1	Spain	Le Pierrier - Clarens, Montreux
3 April 2015; 20:30 CET			0-1 Antonio "Toni" Perez 16' 2nd Hf	Le Pierrier - Clarens, Montreux

=== Group B ===
Team	Pld	W	D	L	GF	GA	GD	Pts
Angola	3	3	0	0	11	5	+14	9
Italy	3	2	0	1	11	10	+1	6
France	3	1	0	2	8	12	-4	3
(Switzerland) Montreux HC	3	0	0	3	6	9	-3	0

1 April 2015; 17:30 CET
1 April 2015; 17:30 CET	France	3 – 4	Angola	Le Pierrier - Clarens, Montreux
1 April 2015; 17:30 CET	1-0 Carlo Di Benedetto LD Blue Card 4' 2nd Hf; 2-2 Rémi Herman 15' 2nd Hf; 3-4 Carlo Di Benedetto LD 10ªF 19' 57s 2nd Hf		1-1 João Vieira "JoHe" 6' 2nd Hf; 1-2 João Vieira "JoHe" rec. GP 9' 2nd Hf; 2-3 André Centeno 16' 2nd Hf; 2-4 João Vieira "JoHe" LD 10ªF 19' 2nd Hf	Le Pierrier - Clarens, Montreux

1 April 2015; 19:30 CET
1 April 2015; 19:30 CET	Italy	4 – 3	(Switzerland) Montreux HC	Le Pierrier - Clarens, Montreux
1 April 2015; 19:30 CET	1-0 Marco Pagnini 1' 1st Hf; 2-0 Samuele Amato 3' 1st Hf; 3-0 Federico Ambrosio 9' 1st Hf; 4-1 Domenico Illuzzi 1' 2nd Hf		3-1 Gaël Jimenez 15' 1st Hf; 4-2 Gaël Jimenez 2' 2nd Hf; 4-3 Andreas Münger LD Blue Card 16' 2nd Hf	Le Pierrier - Clarens, Montreux

2 April 2015; 17:30 CET
2 April 2015; 17:30 CET	Angola	2-1	(Switzerland) Montreux HC	Le Pierrier - Clarens, Montreux
2 April 2015; 17:30 CET	1-0 João Pinto "Mustang" 6' 1st Hf; 2-1 André Centeno 2' 2nd Hf		1-1 Gaël Jimenez 15' 1st Hf	Le Pierrier - Clarens, Montreux

2 April 2015; 22:00 CET
2 April 2015; 22:00 CET	France	2-6	Italy	Le Pierrier - Clarens, Montreux
2 April 2015; 22:00 CET	1-0 Florent David 8' 1st Hf; 2-4 Carlo Di Benedetto LD Azul 10' 2nd Hf		1-1 Federico Ambrosio 17' 1st Hf; 1-2 Federico Ambrosio 1' 2nd Hf; 1-3 Marco Pagnini 3' 2nd Hf; 1-4 Domenico Illuzzi LD 10ªF 7' 2nd Hf; 2-5 Alessandro Verona 16' 2nd Hf; 2-6 Domenico Illuzzi 16' 2nd Hf	Le Pierrier - Clarens, Montreux

3 April 2015; 19:00 CET
3 April 2015; 19:00 CET	France	3-2	(Switzerland) Montreux HC	Le Pierrier - Clarens, Montreux
3 April 2015; 19:00 CET	1-2 Mathieu Le Roux 18' 2nd Hf; 2-2 Mathieu Le Roux 18' 2nd Hf; 3-2 Carlo di Benedetto 19'56s 2nd Hf		0-1 Andreas Münger 5' 1st Hf; 0-2 Adrian Boo Garcia 6' 2nd Hf	Le Pierrier - Clarens, Montreux

3 April 2015; 19:30 CET
3 April 2015; 19:30 CET	Italy	1-5	Angola	Le Pierrier - Clarens, Montreux
3 April 2015; 19:30 CET	1-1 Alessandro Verona 12' 1st Hf		0-1 Martin Payero 11' 1st Hf; 1-2 Humberto Mendes "Big" 17´ 1st Hf; 1-3 Martin Payero 10' 2nd Hf; 1-4 Martin Payero 12' 2nd Hf; 1-5 Humberto Mendes "Big" 14´ 2nd Hf	Le Pierrier - Clarens, Montreux

== Final Phase ==
=== 5th-8th places ===
Semi-finals
4 April - 18:00
Germany
(Switzerland) Montreux HC
4 April - 20:00
France
Switzerland

Final
5 April - 20:00
Germany
France
Third place
5 April - 18:00
(Switzerland) Montreux HC
Switzerland

=== Champion ===
Semi-finals
4 April - 14:00
Angola	2
Portugal	3
4 April - 16:00
Spain	2
Italy	1

Final
5 April - 16_00
Portugal	3
Spain	2
Third place
5 April - 14:00
Angola
Italy

=== Semifinals ===
4 April 2015; 18:00 CET
4 April 2015; 18:00 CET	Angola	2-3	Portugal	Le Pierrier - Clarens, Montreux

4 April 2015; 20:00 CET
4 April 2015; 20:00 CET	Spain	2-1	Italy	Le Pierrier - Clarens, Montreux

=== Final ===
5 April 2015; 20:00 CET
5 April 2015; 20:00 CET	Portugal	3-2	Spain	Le Pierrier - Clarens, Montreux
	Umpires: Le Pierrier - Clarens, Montreux

== Final ranking ==
Lugar	Seleção
Gold medal	Portugal
Silver medal	Spain
Bronze medal	Italy
4	Angola
5	Germany
6	France
7	Switzerland
8	(Switzerland) Montreux HC

Winners 2015 Nations Cup
PORTUGAL
18th
