= 1949 Roller Hockey World Cup =

Roller Hockey Men's World Championships

Tournament details
- Host country: Portugal
- Dates: 28 May 1949– 3 June 1949
- Teams: 8 (from 1 confederation)
- Venue(s): 1 (in 1 host city)

Final positions
- Champions: Portugal (3rd title)
- Runners-up: Spain
- Third place: Italy
- Fourth place: Belgium

Tournament statistics
- Matches played: 28
- Goals scored: 201 (7.18 per match)

The 1949 Roller Hockey World Cup was the fifth roller hockey world cup, organized by the Fédération Internationale de Patinage a Roulettes (now under the name of Fédération Internationale de Roller Sports). It was contested by 8 national teams (all from Europe) and it is also considered the 1949 European Roller Hockey Championship. All the games were played in the city of Lisbon, in Portugal, the chosen city host.

== Results ==
Team	NED	FRA	SWI	ENG	BEL	ITA	ESP	POR
Netherlands								
France	5–2							
Switzerland	8–2	6–5						
England	7–0	1–5	3–3					
Belgium	4–0	2–2	7–2	1–3				
Italy	12–0	5–1	7–3	4–4	1–3			
Spain	9–0	8–6	2–0	5–2	2–1	2–4		
Portugal	9–1	8–1	3–0	5–1	3–1	5–2	6–2	

== Standings ==
Team	Pld	W	D	L	GF	GA	GD	Pts
(gold) Portugal (C)	7	7	0	0	39	8	+31	14
(silver) Spain	7	5	0	2	30	19	+11	10
(bronze) Italy	7	4	1	2	35	18	+17	9
Belgium	7	3	1	3	19	13	+6	7
England	7	2	2	3	21	23	−2	6
France	7	2	1	4	25	32	−7	5
Switzerland	7	2	1	4	22	29	−7	5
Netherlands	7	0	0	7	5	54	−49	0

(C) 1949 World Champion

== See also ==
- FIRS Roller Hockey World Cup
- CERH European Roller Hockey Championship
