= 1968 Roller Hockey World Cup =

Roller Hockey Men's World Championships

Tournament details
- Host country: Portugal
- Dates: 26 April 1968– 4 May 1968
- Teams: 10 (from 5 confederations)
- Venue(s): 1 (in 1 host city)

Final positions
- Champions: Portugal (10th title)
- Runners-up: Spain
- Third place: Argentina
- Fourth place: Italy

Tournament statistics
- Matches played: 45
- Goals scored: 343 (7.62 per match)

The 1968 Roller Hockey World Cup was the eighteenth roller hockey world cup, organized by the Fédération Internationale de Roller Sports. It was contested by 10 national teams (6 from Europe, 1 from South America, 1 from North America, 1 from Asia and 1 from Oceania, for the first time ever). All the games were played in the city of Porto, in Portugal, the chosen city to host the World Cup.

== Results ==
| Team | NED | USA | ESP | ARG | JPN | SWI | FRG | ITA | NZL | POR |
|---|---|---|---|---|---|---|---|---|---|---|
| Netherlands | | | | | | | | | | |
| United States | 3–3 | | | | | | | | | |
| Spain | 8–2 | 3–0 | | | | | | | | |
| Argentina | 1–1 | 4–2 | 2–2 | | | | | | | |
| Japan | 0–11 | 4–5 | 4–15 | 1–3 | | | | | | |
| Switzerland | 2–3 | 3–2 | 0–8 | 0–1 | 4–2 | | | | | |
| West Germany | 1–2 | 3–4 | 0–7 | 1–1 | 4–1 | 7–1 | | | | |
| Italy | 3–0 | 6–1 | 1–3 | 2–3 | 4–2 | 4–2 | 3–2 | | | |
| New Zealand | 2–11 | 1–10 | 1–10 | 1–10 | 5–1 | 0–3 | 3–10 | 0–10 | | |
| Portugal | 8–0 | 3–0 | 2–1 | 3–1 | 26–1 | 15–0 | 10–2 | 4–1 | 21–0 | |

== Standings ==
| Team | Pld | W | D | L | GF | GA | GD | Pts |
|---|---|---|---|---|---|---|---|---|
| (gold) Portugal (C) | 9 | 9 | 0 | 0 | 92 | 6 | +86 | 18 |
| (silver) Spain | 9 | 7 | 1 | 1 | 57 | 12 | +45 | 15 |
| (bronze) Argentina | 9 | 5 | 3 | 1 | 26 | 13 | +13 | 13 |
| Italy | 9 | 6 | 0 | 3 | 34 | 17 | +17 | 12 |
| Netherlands | 9 | 4 | 2 | 3 | 33 | 28 | +5 | 10 |
| United States | 9 | 3 | 1 | 5 | 27 | 30 | −3 | 7 |
| West Germany | 9 | 3 | 1 | 5 | 30 | 32 | −2 | 7 |
| Switzerland | 9 | 3 | 0 | 6 | 15 | 42 | −27 | 6 |
| New Zealand | 9 | 1 | 0 | 8 | 13 | 86 | −73 | 2 |
| Japan | 9 | 0 | 0 | 9 | 16 | 77 | −61 | 0 |

(C) 1968 World Champion

== See also ==
- FIRS Roller Hockey World Cup
