= 1951 Roller Hockey World Cup =

Roller Hockey Men's World Championships

Tournament details
- Host country: Spain
- Dates: 1 June 1951– 10 June 1951
- Teams: 11 (from 1 confederation)
- Venue(s): 1 (in 1 host city)

Final positions
- Champions: Spain (1st title)
- Runners-up: Portugal
- Third place: Italy
- Fourth place: Belgium

Tournament statistics
- Matches played: 55
- Goals scored: 465 (8.45 per match)

The 1951 Roller Hockey World Cup was the seventh roller hockey world cup, organized by the Fédération Internationale de Patinage a Roulettes (now under the name of Fédération Internationale de Roller Sports). It was contested by 11 national teams (all from Europe) and it is also considered the 1951 European Roller Hockey Championship. All the games were played in the city of Barcelona, in Spain, the chosen city to host the World Cup.

== Results ==
Team	DEN	IRE	NED	SWI	ENG	FRA	FRG	BEL	ITA	POR	ESP
Denmark											
Ireland	2–1										
Netherlands	7–0	6–1									
Switzerland	12–0	6–1	3–0								
England	11–0	11–0	6–2	2–1							
France	13–0	10–0	3–1	5–1	6–1						
West Germany	20–0	5–1	4–3	8–1	7–1	3–2					
Belgium	22–0	14–0	6–0	2–3	3–1	2–1	4–3				
Italy	20–0	13–1	6–3	3–2	3–1	2–0	4–3	7–2			
Portugal	20–0	14–0	16–0	10–1	6–2	3–2	3–1	0–1	4–1		
Spain	14–0	20–0	4–1	8–0	7–2	1–1	7–1	5–1	2–1	4–3	

== Standings ==
Team	Pld	W	D	L	GF	GA	GD	Pts
(gold) Spain (C)	10	9	1	0	72	10	+62	19
(silver) Portugal	10	8	0	2	79	12	+67	16
(bronze) Italy	10	8	0	2	61	18	+43	16
Belgium	10	7	0	3	57	20	+37	14
West Germany	10	6	0	4	55	26	+29	12
France	10	5	1	4	43	14	+29	11
England	10	4	0	6	38	35	+3	8
Switzerland	10	4	0	6	30	40	−10	8
Netherlands	10	2	0	8	23	49	−26	4
Ireland	10	1	0	9	6	100	−94	2
Denmark	10	0	0	10	1	141	−140	0

(C) 1951 World Champion

== See also ==
- FIRS Roller Hockey World Cup
- CERH European Roller Hockey Championship
