= 1956 Roller Hockey World Cup =

Roller Hockey Men's World Championships

Tournament details
- Host country: Portugal
- Dates: 26 May 1956– 2 June 1956
- Teams: 11 (from 2 confederations)
- Venue(s): 1 (in 1 host city)

Final positions
- Champions: Portugal (6th title)
- Runners-up: Spain
- Third place: Italy
- Fourth place: West Germany

Tournament statistics
- Matches played: 55
- Goals scored: 247 (4.49 per match)

The 1956 Roller Hockey World Cup was the twelfth roller hockey world cup, organized by the Fédération Internationale de Patinage a Roulettes (now under the name of Fédération Internationale de Roller Sports). It was contested by 11 national teams (10 from Europe and 1 from South America) and it is also considered the 1956 European Roller Hockey Championship (despite the presence of Brazil). All the games were played in the city of Porto, in Portugal, the chosen city to host the World Cup.

== Results ==
Team	NED	FRA	ITA	BEL	NOR	BRA	FRG	ESP	ENG	POR	SWI
Netherlands											
France	0–0										
Italy	2–0	1–1									
Belgium	0–1	3–1	0–7								
Norway	2–2	0–1	4–6	1–3							
Brazil	0–3	4–5	1–3	3–4	4–1						
West Germany	3–1	2–1	1–0	6–0	1–0	4–0					
Spain	6–0	8–0	1–1	7–0	6–0	6–0	1–1				
England	2–1	4–1	1–0	4–2	1–1	5–0	2–0	1–7			
Portugal	4–1	6–0	1–1	3–1	10–1	5–0	3–1	1–0	6–1		
Switzerland	1–2	3–1	0–4	3–3	5–2	6–0	1–0	2–7	4–2	0–5	

== Standings ==
Team	Pld	W	D	L	GF	GA	GD	Pts
(gold) Portugal (C)	10	9	1	0	44	6	+38	19
(silver) Spain	10	7	2	1	49	6	+43	16
(bronze) Italy	10	5	3	2	25	10	+15	13
West Germany	10	6	1	3	19	9	+10	13
England	10	6	1	3	23	22	+1	13
Switzerland	10	5	1	4	25	26	−1	11
Netherlands	10	3	2	5	11	20	−9	8
Belgium	10	3	1	6	16	36	−20	7
France	10	2	2	6	11	31	−20	6
Brazil	10	1	0	9	12	42	−30	2
Norway	10	0	2	8	12	39	−27	2

(C) 1956 World Champion

== See also ==
- FIRS Roller Hockey World Cup
- CERH European Roller Hockey Championship
