= 1947 Roller Hockey World Cup =

Roller Hockey Men's World Championships

Tournament details
- Host country: Portugal
- Dates: 18 May 1947– 24 May 1947
- Teams: 7 (from 1 confederation)
- Venue(s): 1 (in 1 host city)

Final positions
- Champions: Portugal (1st title)
- Runners-up: Belgium
- Third place: Spain
- Fourth place: Italy

Tournament statistics
- Matches played: 21
- Goals scored: 122 (5.81 per match)

The 1947 Roller Hockey World Cup was the third roller hockey world cup, organized by the Fédération Internationale de Patinage a Roulettes (now under the name of Fédération Internationale de Roller Sports). It was contested by 7 national teams (all from Europe) and it is also considered the 1947 European Roller Hockey Championship. All the games were played in the city of Lisbon, in Portugal, the chosen city to host the World Cup.

== Results ==
Team	SWI	FRA	ENG	ITA	ESP	BEL	POR
Switzerland							
France	4–3						
England	5–2	3–2					
Italy	7–2	0–1	4–3				
Spain	2–1	3–2	2–5	4–3			
Belgium	6–0	6–2	6–0	3–4	1–1		
Portugal	5–2	7–1	3–0	3–2	2–1	7–2	

== Standings ==
Team	Pld	W	D	L	GF	GA	GD	Pts
(gold) Portugal (C)	6	6	0	0	27	8	+19	12
(silver) Belgium	6	3	1	2	24	14	+10	7
(bronze) Spain	6	3	1	2	13	14	−1	7
Italy	6	3	0	3	20	16	+4	6
England	6	3	0	3	16	19	−3	6
France	6	2	0	4	12	22	−10	4
Switzerland	6	0	0	6	10	29	−19	0

(C) 1947 World Champion

== See also ==
- FIRS Roller Hockey World Cup
- CERH European Roller Hockey Championship
