= Roller hockey at the Mediterranean Games =

Roller hockey was played at the Mediterranean Games in 1955 in Barcelona. Italy became champion followed by Spain and France.

== Men's tournament ==
Year	Host	Gold medal game			Bronze medal game
Year	Host	Gold medalist	Score	Silver medalist	Bronze medalist	Score	Fourth place
1955	(Spain); Barcelona	Italy	^{n/a}	Spain	France	^{n/a}	Egypt

^n/a A round-robin tournament determined the final standings.

== Group matches ==
	Team	Points	G	W	D	L	GF	GA	Diff
1.	Italy	6	3	3	0	0	11	4	+7
2.	Spain	4	3	2	0	1	16	4	+12
3.	France	2	3	1	0	2	8	13	–5
4.	Egypt	0	3	0	0	3	1	15	–14

- July 16, 1955

Spain	8 – 2	France
Egypt	1 – 4	Italy

- July 17, 1955

France	2 – 5	Italy
Spain	7 – 0	Egypt

- July 18, 1955

France	4 – 0	Egypt
Italy	2 – 1	Spain

=== Medal table ===
Rank	Nation	Gold	Silver	Bronze	Total
1	Italy	1	0	0	1
2	Spain	0	1	0	1
3	France	0	0	1	1
Totals (3 entries)		1	1	1	3
