= Netherlands national hockey team =

The Netherlands national hockey team may refer to:

- Netherlands men's national field hockey team
- Netherlands women's national field hockey team
- Netherlands men's national ice hockey team
  - Netherlands men's national junior ice hockey team
  - Netherlands men's national under-18 ice hockey team
- Netherlands women's national ice hockey team
- Netherlands national roller hockey team
