= Rink Hockey European Championship =

Rolly hockey competition

- Current season, competition or edition: 2025 Rink Hockey European Championship
- Sport: Roller Hockey
- Founded: 1926; 100 years ago
- No. of teams: 8
- Continent: Europe (World Skate Europe Rink Hockey)
- Most recent champions: Portugal (22nd title)
- Most titles: Portugal (22 titles)

The Rink Hockey European Championship is a European roller hockey competition organised by World Skate Europe Rink Hockey since 1926 and contested by the senior men's national teams of its top-ranked member associations.

Portugal are the current champions, after defeating France 4–1 in the 2025 final. With this victory, Portugal increased their record number of titles in this competition to 22, ahead of Spain's 19 titles.

== Results ==
Held as part of the Men's Roller Hockey World Cup (12 Editions).

#	Year	Host city	Winner	Score	Runners-up	Third place	Score	Fourth place	Teams
1	1926; Details	(United Kingdom) Herne Bay	England		France	Germany		Switzerland	6
2	1927; Details	(Switzerland) Montreux	England		France	Switzerland		Germany	6
3	1928; Details	(United Kingdom) Herne Bay	England		France	Switzerland		Germany	6
4	1929; Details	(Switzerland) Montreux	England		Italy	France		Germany	6
5	1930; Details	(United Kingdom) Herne Bay	England		France	Germany		Switzerland	6
6	1931; Details	(Switzerland) Montreux	England		France	Switzerland		Italy	7
7	1932; Details	(United Kingdom) Herne Bay	England		Germany	France		Portugal	6
8	1934; Details	(United Kingdom) Herne Bay	England		Germany	Switzerland		Italy	6
9	1936 (Note: In 1936 and then from 1939 to 1956, the tournament was also considered a World Cup.); Details	(Germany) Stuttgart	England		Italy	Portugal		Switzerland	7
10	1937; Details	(United Kingdom) Herne Bay	England		Switzerland	Portugal		Italy	7
11	1938; Details	(Belgium) Antwerp	England		Italy	Belgium		Portugal	7
12	1939; Details	(Switzerland) Montreux	England		Italy	Portugal		Belgium	7
13	1947; Details	(Portugal) Lisbon	Portugal		Belgium	Spain		Italy	7
14	1948; Details	(Switzerland) Montreux	Portugal		England	Italy		Spain	9
15	1949; Details	(Portugal) Lisbon	Portugal		Spain	Italy		Belgium	8
16	1950; Details	(Italy) Milan	Portugal		Italy	Switzerland		Spain	10
17	1951; Details	(Spain) Barcelona	Spain		Portugal	Italy		Belgium	11
18	1952; Details	(Portugal) Porto	Portugal		Italy	Spain		Belgium	10
19	1953; Details	(Switzerland) Geneva	Italy		Portugal	Spain		Switzerland	13
20	1954; Details	(Spain) Barcelona	Spain		Portugal	Italy		Belgium	15
21	1955; Details	(Italy) Milan	Spain		Italy	Portugal		Switzerland	14
22	1956; Details	(Portugal) Porto	Portugal		Spain	Italy		West Germany	11
23	1957; Details	(Spain) Barcelona	Spain		Portugal	Italy		England	6
24	1959; Details	(Switzerland) Geneva	Portugal		Spain	Italy		England	10
25	1961; Details	(Italy) Turin	Portugal		Spain	Italy		Netherlands	10
26	1963; Details	(Portugal) Porto	Portugal		Spain	Netherlands		Switzerland	9
27	1965; Details	(Portugal) Lisbon	Portugal		Spain	Italy		Netherlands	9
28	1967; Details	(Spain) Bilbao	Portugal		Spain	Netherlands		Italy	9
29	1969; Details	(Switzerland) Lausanne	Spain		Portugal	Netherlands		Switzerland	9
30	1971; Details	(Portugal) Lisbon	Portugal		Spain	Italy		West Germany	9
31	1973; Details	(West Germany) Iserlohn	Portugal		Spain	West Germany		Italy	9
32	1975; Details	(Italy) Viareggio	Portugal		Spain	Italy		West Germany	8
33	1977; Details	(Portugal) Porto	Portugal		Spain	Italy		West Germany	9
34	1979; Details	(Spain) Barcelona	Spain		Portugal	Italy		Netherlands	9
35	1981; Details	(West Germany) Essen	Spain		Portugal	Italy		Netherlands	9
36	1983; Details	(Italy) Vercelli	Spain		Portugal	Italy		Netherlands	8
37	1985; Details	(Portugal) Barcelos	Spain		Italy	Portugal		Netherlands	9
38	1987; Details	(Spain) Oviedo	Portugal		Spain	Italy		West Germany	9
39	1990; Details	(Italy) Lodi	Italy		Spain	Portugal		Netherlands	9
40	1992; Details	(Germany) Wuppertal	Portugal		Italy	Spain		Germany	10
41	1994; Details	(Portugal) Funchal	Portugal	3–1	Spain	Italy	3–0	Switzerland	13
42	1996; Details	(Italy) Salsomaggiore	Portugal	League	Italy	Spain	League	Switzerland	9
43	1998; Details	(Portugal) Paços de Ferreira	Portugal	1–1 (a.e.t.) (1–0p)	Spain	Italy	10–2	Switzerland	10
44	2000; Details	(Switzerland) Wimmis	Spain	6–3	Portugal	Italy	4–0	France	8
45	2002; Details	(Italy) Florence	Spain	4–2	Portugal	Italy	4–3	France	9
46	2004; Details	(France) La Roche-sur-Yon	Spain	4–2	Italy	Portugal	2–1	Switzerland	8
47	2006; Details	(Italy) Monza	Spain	2–0	Switzerland	Portugal	5–4	Italy	9
48	2008; Details	(Spain) Oviedo	Spain	1–0	Portugal	Italy	4–3	France	8
49	2010; Details	(Germany) Wuppertal	Spain	8–2	Portugal	France	1–1 (a.e.t.) (2–0p)	Germany	8
50	2012; Details	(Portugal) Paredes	Spain	League	Portugal	Italy	League	France	7
51	2014; Details	(Spain) Alcobendas	Italy	League	Spain	Portugal	League	Germany	6
52	2016; Details	(Portugal) Oliveira de Azeméis	Portugal	6–2	Italy	Spain	7–1	Switzerland	8
53	2018; Details	(Spain) A Coruña	Spain	6–3	Portugal	Italy	5–2	France	11
54	2021 (Note: Originally scheduled to be held in July 2020, at La Roche-sur-Yon, the tournament was delayed and his location changed to Paredes due to the COVID-19 pandemic in Europe.); Details	(Portugal) Paredes	Spain	2–1 (a.e.t.)	France	Not played (between Portugal and Italy).			6
55	2023; Details	(Spain) Sant Sadurní d'Anoia	Spain	4–2	Portugal	Italy	6–5	France	8
56	2025; Details	(Portugal) Paredes	Portugal	4–1	France	Italy	3–1	Spain	8

== Medal table ==
Rank	Nation	Gold	Silver	Bronze	Total
1	Portugal	22	15	9	46
2	Spain	19	16	6	41
3	England	12	1	0	13
4	Italy	3	12	24	39
5	France	0	7	3	10
6	Germany	0	2	4	6
6	Switzerland	0	2	4	6
8	Belgium	0	1	1	2
9	Netherlands	0	0	4	4
Totals (9 entries)		56	56	55	167

== See also ==
- Rink Hockey Female European Championship
- World Skate Europe - all competitions
