= Spain national roller hockey team =

Spain
- Nickname: La Roja
- Association: Real Federación Española de Patinaje
- Confederation: World Skate Europe
- Head coach: Alejandro Domínguez
Home colours	Away colours

Ranking
- Ranking: 3rd

First international
- Switzerland 1–2 Spain (Lisbon, Portugal; 18 May 1947)

Spain national roller hockey team has represented Spain in men's international roller hockey since the 1940s. It is governed by the Royal Spanish Skating Federation (Spanish: Real Federación Española de Patinaje, RFEP).

It is one of the most successful teams in the world and has been dominating both the Rink Hockey World Championship and the Rink Hockey European Championship in the last decade. Spain has 18 World titles and 16 European titles, among others.

== Squad ==
Player	Position	Born	Club
Jordi Adroher	FW	1984	(Portugal) Benfica
Ignacio Alabart	DF/MF	1996	(Spain) Barcelona
Pau Bargalló	FW	1994	(Spain) Barcelona
Albert Casanovas	DF/MF	1985	(Portugal) Benfica
Sergio Fernández	GK	1985	(Spain) Barcelona
Ferran Font	FW	1996	(Portugal) Sporting
Eduard Lamas	DF/MF	1990	(Spain) Liceo
Xavier Malián	GK	1989	(Spain) Liceo
Toni Pérez	FW	1990	(Portugal) Sporting
Nil Roca	DF/MF	1997	(Spain) Barcelona

- Head coach: Alejandro Domínguez

== Titles ==
- Roller Hockey World Cup (18): 1951, 1954, 1955, 1964, 1966, 1970, 1972, 1976, 1980, 1989, 2001, 2005, 2007, 2009, 2011, 2013, 2017, 2024
- European Roller Hockey Championship (19): 1951, 1954, 1955, 1957, 1969, 1979, 1981, 1983, 1985, 2000, 2002, 2004, 2006, 2008, 2010, 2012, 2018, 2021, 2023
- Nations Cup (17): 1952, 1953, 1957, 1959, 1960, 1975, 1976, 1978, 1980, 1991, 1995, 1999, 2000, 2001, 2003, 2005, 2007

== Competitive record ==
=== World Championship ===
Year	Pos.	GP	W	D	L
(Germany) 1936	did not enter				
(Switzerland) 1939	did not enter				
(Portugal) 1947	3rd	6	3	1	2
(Switzerland) 1948	4th	8	5	1	2
(Portugal) 1949	2nd	7	5	0	2
(Italy) 1950	4th	9	5	1	3
(Spain) 1951	1st	10	9	1	0
(Portugal) 1952	3rd	9	6	1	2
(Switzerland) 1953	3rd	9	5	2	2
(Spain) 1954	1st	14	14	0	0
(Italy) 1955	1st	7	6	1	0
(Portugal) 1956	2nd	10	7	2	1
(Portugal) 1958	2nd	9	6	3	0
(Spain) 1960	2nd	9	8	0	1
(Chile) 1962	3rd	9	6	3	0
(Spain) 1964	1st	9	9	0	0
(Brazil) 1966	1st	9	9	0	0
(Portugal) 1968	2nd	9	7	1	1
(Argentina) 1970	1st	10	10	0	0
(Spain) 1972	1st	11	11	0	0
(Portugal) 1974	2nd	11	8	2	1
(Spain) 1976	1st	11	10	1	0
(Argentina) 1978	2nd	11	10	0	1
(Chile) 1980	1st	10	8	1	1
(Portugal) 1982	2nd	15	12	2	1
(Italy) 1984	4th	9	5	1	3
(Brazil) 1986	2nd	9	8	0	1
(Spain) 1988	2nd	9	8	0	1
(Argentina) 1989	1st	8	7	0	1
(Portugal) 1991	6th	8	6	0	2
(Italy) 1993	4th	7	4	1	2
(Brazil) 1995	3rd	8	6	0	2
(Germany) 1997	3rd	8	5	1	2
(Spain) 1999	2nd	8	6	1	1
(Argentina) 2001	1st	5	4	1	0
(Portugal) 2003	3rd	6	5	0	1
(United States) 2005	1st	6	6	0	0
(Switzerland) 2007	1st	6	6	0	0
(Spain) 2009	1st	6	6	0	0
(Argentina) 2011	1st	6	6	0	0
(Angola) 2013	1st	6	6	0	0
(France) 2015	2nd	6	5	0	1
(China) 2017	1st	6	6	0	0
(Spain) 2019	3rd	6	5	0	1
(Argentina) 2022	5th	6	4	1	1
(Italy) 2024	1st	6	6	0	0

== See also ==
- Spain women's national roller hockey team
