= Men's Roller Hockey World Cup =

- Current season, competition or edition: 2024 Roller Hockey World Cup
- Sport: Roller hockey
- Founded: 1936; 90 years ago
- First season: 1936
- No. of teams: 16
- Continent: International (World Skate)
- Most recent champion: France (1st title)
- Most titles: Spain (18 titles)

The World Skate Roller Hockey World Cup is the international championship for roller hockey organized by World Skate. The first event was held in 1936, in the city of Stuttgart. Since 1989, the World Championship tournament is held every two years on the odd years. Until 2017, it was organized by the Fédération Internationale de Roller Sports. As of 2019, following the merge between the FIRS and the International Skateboarding Federation, the World Cup is now an event of the larger World Roller Games.

Through the 2019 World Cup, only five countries have taken the Roller Hockey World Cup: England winning two times, Portugal winning sixteen times, Spain winning seventeen times, Italy winning four times and Argentina winning five times.

Since the 2003 World Cup all events have been 16-team events, featuring a four group round-robin tournament with four teams in each group. The top two teams in each group advance to an eight team knockout final series.

== FIRS Roller Hockey World Championship ==
=== Results ===
#	Year	Host city	Winner	Score	Runners-up	Third place	Score	Fourth place	Teams
1	1936; Details	(Germany) Stuttgart	England	League	Italy	Portugal	League	Switzerland	7
2	1939; Details	(Switzerland) Montreux	England	League	Italy	Portugal	League	Belgium	7
3	1947; Details	(Portugal) Lisbon	Portugal	League	Belgium	Spain	League	Italy	7
4	1948; Details	(Switzerland) Montreux	Portugal	League	England	Italy	League	Spain	9
5	1949; Details	(Portugal) Lisbon	Portugal	League	Spain	Italy	League	Belgium	8
6	1950; Details	(Italy) Milan	Portugal	4–0	Italy	Switzerland	League	Spain	10
7	1951; Details	(Spain) Barcelona	Spain	League	Portugal	Italy	League	Belgium	11
8	1952; Details	(Portugal) Porto	Portugal	4–0	Italy	Spain	League	Belgium	10
9	1953; Details	(Switzerland) Geneva	Italy	League	Portugal	Spain	League	Switzerland	13
10	1954; Details	(Spain) Barcelona	Spain	League	Portugal	Italy	League	Belgium	15
11	1955; Details	(Italy) Milan	Spain	League	Italy	Portugal	League	Switzerland	14
12	1956; Details	(Portugal) Porto	Portugal	League	Spain	Italy	League	West Germany	11
13	1958; Details	(Portugal) Porto	Portugal	League	Spain	Italy	League	Netherlands	10
14	1960; Details	(Spain) Madrid	Portugal	League	Spain	Argentina	League	Italy	10
15	1962; Details	(Chile) Santiago	Portugal	League	Italy	Spain	League	Switzerland	10
16	1964; Details	(Spain) Barcelona	Spain	League	Portugal	Italy	League	Netherlands	10
17	1966; Details	(Brazil) São Paulo	Spain	League	Portugal	Argentina	League	Italy	10
18	1968; Details	(Portugal) Porto	Portugal	League	Spain	Argentina	League	Italy	10
19	1970; Details	(Argentina) San Juan	Spain	League	Portugal	Italy	League	Argentina	11
20	1972; Details	(Spain) A Coruña	Spain	League	Portugal	Argentina	League	West Germany	12
21	1974; Details	(Portugal) Lisbon	Portugal	League	Spain	Argentina	League	West Germany	12
22	1976; Details	(Spain) Oviedo	Spain	League	Argentina	Portugal	League	West Germany	12
23	1978; Details	(Argentina) San Juan	Argentina	League	Spain	Portugal	League	West Germany	12
24	1980; Details	(Chile) Talcahuano	Spain	League	Argentina	Portugal	League	Chile	16
25	1982; Details	(Portugal) Barcelos	Portugal	League	Spain	Argentina	League	Chile	22
26	1984; Details	(Italy) Novara	Argentina	League	Italy	Portugal	League	Spain	10
27	1986; Details	(Brazil) Sertãozinho	Italy	League	Spain	Portugal	League	Argentina	10
28	1988; Details	(Spain) A Coruña	Italy	League	Spain	Portugal	League	Argentina	10
29	1989; Details	(Argentina) San Juan	Spain	2–1	Portugal	Italy	11–2	Chile	12
30	1991; Details	(Portugal) Porto	Portugal	7–0	Netherlands	Argentina	6–0	Brazil	12
31	1993; Details	(Italy) Bassano d.G., Sesto S.G.	Portugal	3–3 (a.e.t.); 1–0 (p)	Italy	Argentina	3–2	Spain	12
32	1995; Details	(Brazil) Recife	Argentina	5–1	Portugal	Spain	2–0	Brazil	12
33	1997; Details	(Germany) Wuppertal	Italy	5–0	Argentina	Spain	3–1	Portugal	12
34	1999; Details	(Spain) Reus	Argentina	1–0	Spain	Portugal	5–4	Italy	12
35	2001; Details	(Argentina) San Juan	Spain	2–2 (a.e.t.); 1–0 (p)	Argentina	Italy	5–3	Portugal	15
36	2003; Details	(Portugal) Oliveira de Azeméis	Portugal	1–0 (a.e.t.)	Italy	Spain	3–1	Argentina	16
37	2005; Details	(United States) San Jose	Spain	2–1	Argentina	Portugal	4–3	Italy	16
38	2007; Details	(Switzerland) Montreux	Spain	8–1	Switzerland	Argentina	2–2 (a.e.t.); 1–0 (p)	Italy	16
39	2009; Details	(Spain) Vigo	Spain	3–1	Argentina	Portugal	8–3	Brazil	16
40	2011; Details	(Argentina) San Juan	Spain	5–4	Argentina	Portugal	9–2	Mozambique	16
41	2013; Details	(Angola) Luanda and Namibe	Spain	4–3	Argentina	Portugal	10–3	Chile	16
42	2015; Details	(France) La Roche-sur-Yon	Argentina	6–1	Spain	Portugal	7–3	Germany	16
At World Skate Games									
43	2017; Details	(China) Nanjing	Spain	3–3 (a.e.t.); 2–1 (p)	Portugal	Argentina	4–2	Italy	22
44	2019; Details	(Spain) Barcelona	Portugal	0–0 (a.e.t.); 2–1 (p)	Argentina	Spain	5–0	France	27
45	2022; Details	(Argentina) Buenos Aires and San Juan	Argentina	4–2	Portugal	France	5–5 (a.e.t.); 3–2 (p)	Italy	22
46	2024; Details	(Italy) Novara	Spain	2–1	Argentina	Italy	3–2	Portugal	27
47	2026; Details	(Paraguay) Asunción	France	2–2 (a.e.t.); 2–1 (p)	Argentina	Portugal	5–3	Spain	27

=== Ranking ===
Rank	Nation	Gold	Silver	Bronze	Total
1	Spain	18	12	8	38
2	Portugal	16	11	16	43
3	Argentina	6	11	10	27
4	Italy	4	9	11	24
5	England	2	1	0	3
6	France	1	0	1	2
7	Switzerland	0	1	1	2
8	Belgium	0	1	0	1
8	Netherlands	0	1	0	1
Totals (9 entries)		47	47	47	141

== FIRS Roller Hockey "B" World Championship ==
Men's Roller Hockey World Cup
- Founded: 1984
- Region: International (FIRS)
- Teams: 7–9
- Current champions: Austria (1st title)
- Most championships: United States (3 titles)

The FIRS Roller Hockey "B" World Championship was the second-tier level international championship for roller hockey organized by FIRS. The event was a 7 to 9-team event, featuring a two group round-robin tournament. The top four teams in each group advanced to an eight team knockout final series. This model was discontinued in favour of a B group in the "A" World Championship, starting with the 2017 FIRS Roller Hockey World Cup.

The tournament was held every two years, on the even years. The first event was held in 1984, in the city of Paris.

The first three-placed nations were granted an entry to next year's "A" World Championship and the last three-placed nations on the "A" tournament were relegated to the next year's "B" World Championship.

=== Results ===
#	Year	Host city	Winner	Score	Runners-up	Third place	Score	Fourth place	Teams
1	1984; Details	(France) Paris	France	League	Belgium	England	League	Angola	9
2	1986; Details	Mexico City	West Germany	League	Netherlands	Mozambique	League	Australia	9
3	1988; Details	Colombia	Colombia	League	Switzerland	Chile	League	Australia	12
4	1990; Details	Macau	Brazil	1–0	Switzerland	Australia	4–1	England	22
5	1992; Details	Andorra	Andorra	5–3	France	Angola	2–1	Mozambique	16
6	1994; Details	Chile	France	4–1	Angola	Chile	5–1	Colombia	15
7	1996; Details	Mexico City	United States	4–1	Netherlands	Colombia	5–1	Andorra	17
8	1998; Details	Macau	Chile	5–4	United States	Mozambique	7–4	Andorra	19
9	2000; Details	(England) Chatham	England	2–0	Netherlands	Canada	8–3	Uruguay	15
10	2002; Details	(Uruguay) Montevideo	Andorra	5–4	Colombia	England	3–1	Uruguay	10
11	2004; Details	Macau	Catalonia	6–0	England	Andorra	2–0	Macau	11
12	2006; Details	(Uruguay) Montevideo	Mozambique	League	Netherlands	Colombia	League	Macau	12
13	2008; Details	(South Africa) Johannesburg	United States	7–3	Netherlands	Colombia	9–1	South Africa	12
14	2010; Details	(Austria) Dornbirn	United States	5–1	South Africa	Netherlands	4–3	Austria	12
15	2012; Details	(Uruguay) Canelones	South Africa	4–3	England	Austria	3–1	Uruguay	9
16	2014; Details	(Uruguay) Canelones	Austria	1–0	England	Netherlands	11–3	United States	7

=== Ranking ===
Rank	Nation	Gold	Silver	Bronze	Total
1	United States	3	0	0	3
2	France	2	1	0	3
3	Andorra	2	0	1	3
4	England	1	4	2	7
5	Colombia	1	1	3	5
6	South Africa	1	1	0	2
7	Chile	1	0	2	3
7	Mozambique	1	0	2	3
9	Austria	1	0	1	2
10	Brazil	1	0	0	1
10	Catalonia	1	0	0	1
10	Germany	1	0	0	1
13	Netherlands	0	5	2	7
14	Switzerland	0	2	0	2
15	Angola	0	1	1	2
16	Belgium	0	1	0	1
17	Australia	0	0	1	1
17	Canada	0	0	1	1
Totals (18 entries)		16	16	16	48

== See also ==
- Women's Roller Hockey World Cup
- Roller Hockey World Cup U-20
