= Uruguay national roller hockey team =

Uruguay
- Association: Uruguay Roller Sports Federation
- Confederation: CPRS
- Head coach: Jorge Escobar
- Captain: Claudio Maeso
Home colours	Away colours

Ranking
- Ranking: 19

The Uruguay national roller hockey team is the national team side of Uruguay at international roller hockey. Usually it is part of FIRS Roller Hockey World Cup and CSP Copa América.

== Current squad ==
=== Players ===
The following players were named in the squad for the 2010 FIRS Roller Hockey B World Cup

Goaltenders
#	Player	Hometown	Club
1	Miguel Camuratti
12	Aldo Tomassini
Field Players
#	Player	Hometown	Club
6	Gustavo Castro
7	Jonathan Velazco
4	Emiliano Bentos
3	Alexis Mazurski
2	Hernan Mazurski
5	Martin Batistoni
8	Claudio Maeso (Captain)

Team Staff

- General manager:
- Mechanic:

Coaching Staff

- Head coach: Jorge Escobar
- Assistant: Jimeno Xavi
