= Egypt national roller hockey team =

Egypt
- Association: Egypt Roller Hockey Federation
- Confederation: FARS

Ranking
- Ranking: 23

The Egypt national roller hockey team is the national team of Egypt for international roller hockey. It is usually part of the FIRS Roller Hockey World Cup.

== Egypt squad ==
Goaltenders
#	Player	Hometown	Club
Field Players
#	Player	Hometown	Club

Team Staff

- General Manager:
- Mechanic:

Coaching Staff

- Head Coach:
- Assistant:
