= Hockey jersey =

Clothing worn by ice hockey players

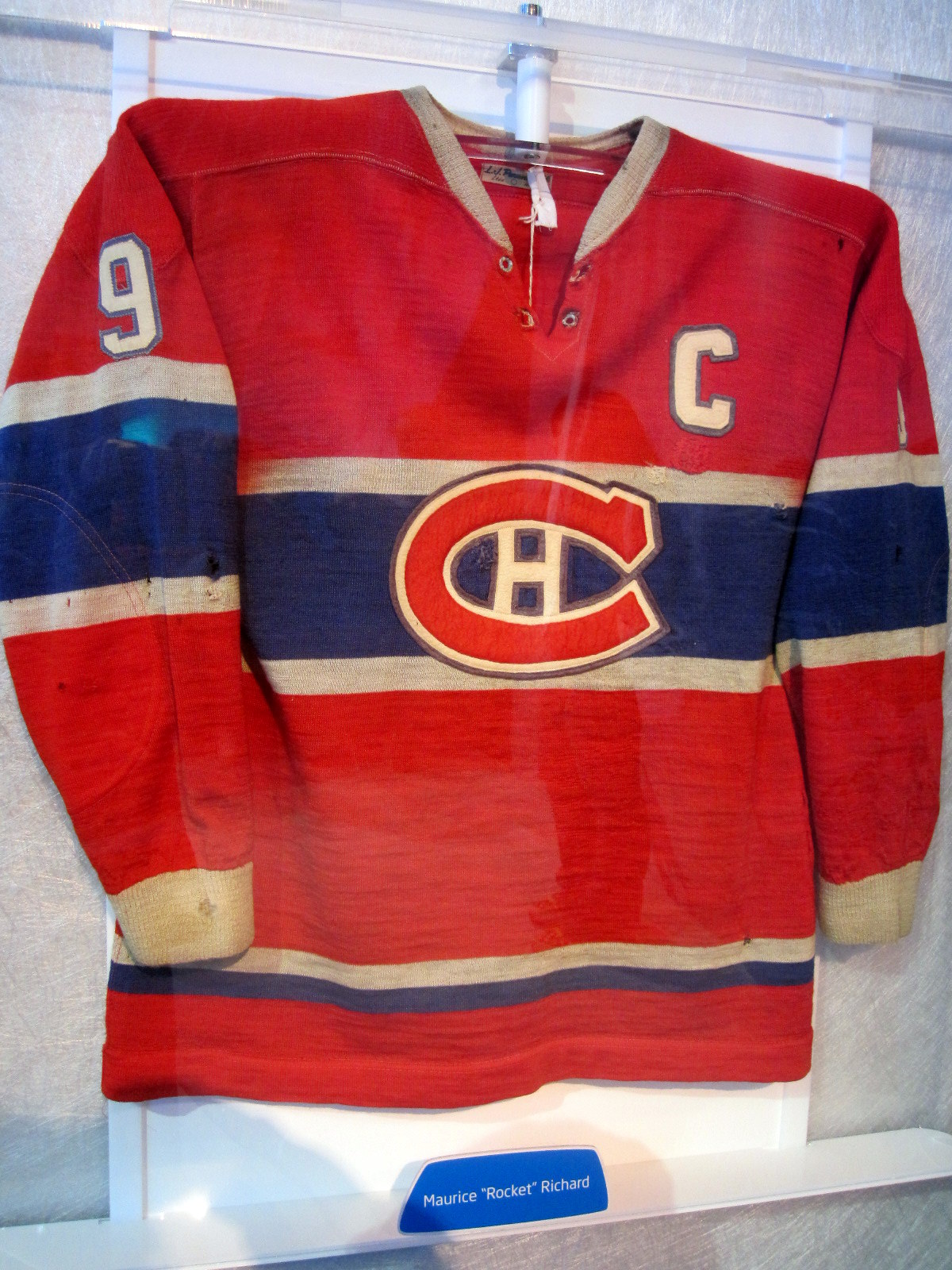
Display of 1959-60 Montreal Canadiens sweater worn by Maurice Richard

A hockey jersey is a piece of clothing worn by ice hockey players to cover the upper part of their bodies. They also are worn by fans to show support for a team, or to create ties to a hometown or region.

"Hockey sweater" is a term originating from the sport's earlier days when it was predominantly played outside during winter and when the sweaters worn by players were warm, wool-knit coverings. In some regions it is still the preferred terminology.

== Design ==
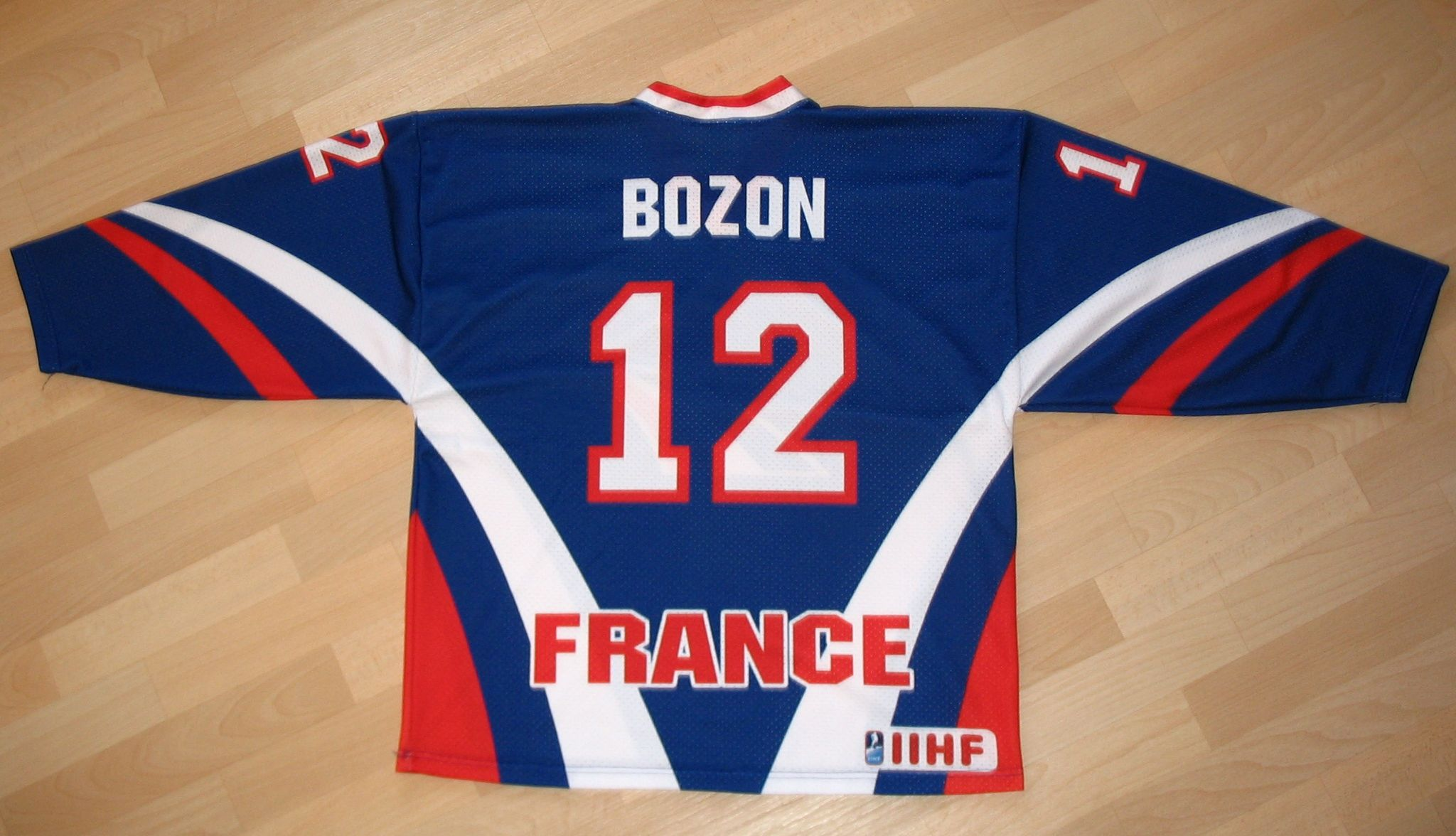
Back of the France men's national ice hockey team jersey, circa 2008

Hockey jerseys today are typically made of tough synthetic materials like polyester, to help take away moisture and keep the wearer dry. Most professional ice hockey teams sell replica sweaters both with no names and of their players at sports memorabilia stores, as well as being available for purchase at arenas.

For most leagues around the world, in accordance with the team's colours and matching the socks, they are usually emblazoned with the team's logo on the front, the player's last name on the upper back, and a designated number below, from 0 to 99. A team captain wears an uppercase "C" above and to the right of the team logo on their sweaters (although a few NHL teams have the letter above and to the left). Two other players, designated alternate captains, wear an uppercase "A" on theirs.

Hockey jerseys are often more complicated than football or baseball jerseys, due the front crest being a major feature rather than player numbers. Due to this the NHL requires an 18 month notice from any team looking to change their jerseys.

There are many manufacturer specific traits that can affect the on ice design. Nike jerseys for the 2014 and 2022 Olympic hockey tournaments had designs to simplify the look, using a more tapered design when compared to the standard loose and baggy style. These designs were divisive as Nike added other design elements such as sublimation and a feel of attempting to be flashy.

For the NHL in 2007 Reebok added the league's shield logo to an insert in the neckline rather than the bottom hem, giving every team a V neck design. Which was changed again in 2017 when Adidas took over, giving all teams a collar that was flush with the rest of the jersey and adding dimples to the shoulders. Adidas was sued in 2022 for having their retail version of jerseys not comparable to the on ice product despite being advertised as such, having thinner materials and a lower quality tie down fight strap.

Sweaters worn in European leagues and tournaments are adorned with sponsor advertisements, a concept borrowed from football jerseys. The NHL first allowed ads on jerseys in the 2022-23 season.

=== Alternate jerseys ===
Many hockey leagues across the globe also have an additional third or alternate jersey, like the NHL. These jerseys usually have a special design as the crest and are sometimes part of a special event such as the Winter Classic or Stadium Series, or leaguewide initiative like the Reverse Retro line which brought back vintage designs. However, many other leagues have different alternate jerseys for many different things. For example, the Sioux Falls Stampede in the USHL rebrand to the "Sioux Falls Fighting Wiener Dogs" for a night and wear a special jersey with a group of dachshunds stampeding forwards, although they changed the logo to a dachshund holding a hockey stick.

NHL teams also have special nights where they recognize a significant cultural group or event where they will have special jerseys worn in warmups to show their appreciation. Leaguewide events like Pride night will have special LGBTQIA+ designs on the jersey and players can opt to have rainbow stick tape to show support in addition to the jersey worn during warmups. However, each team has their own nights for special events.

=== Exceptions ===
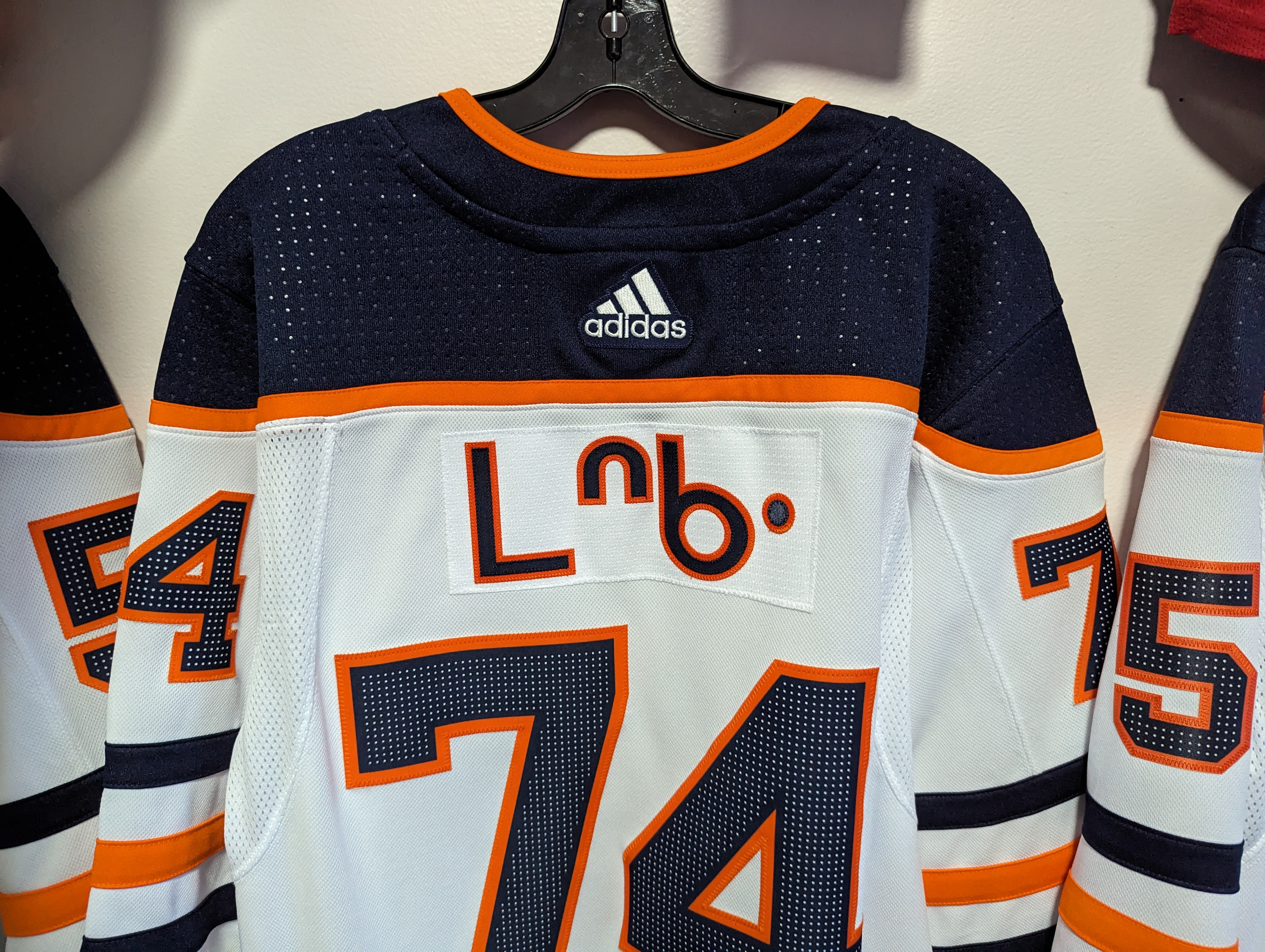
An Oilers jersey with Bear in Cree

The design is often adapted for specific cases, such as former NHL Vancouver Canucks teammates Henrik and Daniel Sedin. Their last names are accompanied by their first initials, since being twin brothers they share the same last name on the same roster. Similarly, Aku and Aatu Räty wear jerseys with two letters from their first names when playing for the same team to distinguish them. During an exhibition match between the Calgary Flames and Edmonton Oilers, defenseman Ethan Bear, who is of Cree descent, wore a jersey with his last name on it written in Cree syllabics.

In 2024 for the PWHL's first season many fans noted due to the long hair of the players, names on the jerseys were covered. Molson took this chance to advertise with the "See my name" campaign putting their sponsorship patch where the name would typically go, and putting the players name under the numbers.

The National Hockey League no longer permits 0 nor 00 for jersey numbers, as they cannot be entered into the NHL's database, and the available numbers only go up to 98 since the League retired the number 99 in honour of Wayne Gretzky. Other leagues have retired numbers league wide, such as the QMJHL which has retired 4 for Guy Lafleur, and 87 for Sidney Crosby.

== Cultural impact ==
=== Etymology ===
There is some debate as to whether the on-ice apparel should be referred to as a jersey or a sweater. Originally they were called sweaters as they were made of wool and were worn outdoors without other equipment under them. Since they have switched to a more athletic knit material the term jersey has come into more common use, as well as being used to differentiate between the two. With older styles remaining sweaters and current apparel being called jerseys. Some interpret it as a difference between Canadian English and American English as American sports have used the term "Jersey" for their sports uniforms, such as Gridiron football. Canadian French uses the word "Chandail" to refer to them, being translated to sweater.

=== Fashion and media ===
The cultural impact of the hockey sweater in Canada is encapsulated by the short story The Hockey Sweater by Roch Carrier. In it, a young hockey fan asks his mother to order a Montreal Canadiens sweater from an Eatons department store catalogue, but instead accidentally receives a sweater for the team's arch-rival, the Toronto Maple Leafs, much to his embarrassment and the derision from his friends. The story was later made into a short animated film of the same name, which was produced by the National Film Board of Canada; a quote from it appears on the 2003 Canadian five-dollar bill.

In Ferris Bueller's Day Off the character Cameron played by Alan Ruck wears a Detroit Red Wings Gordie Howe jersey. Ruck said this was to give the character more depth and independence that wasn’t shown directly in the movie.

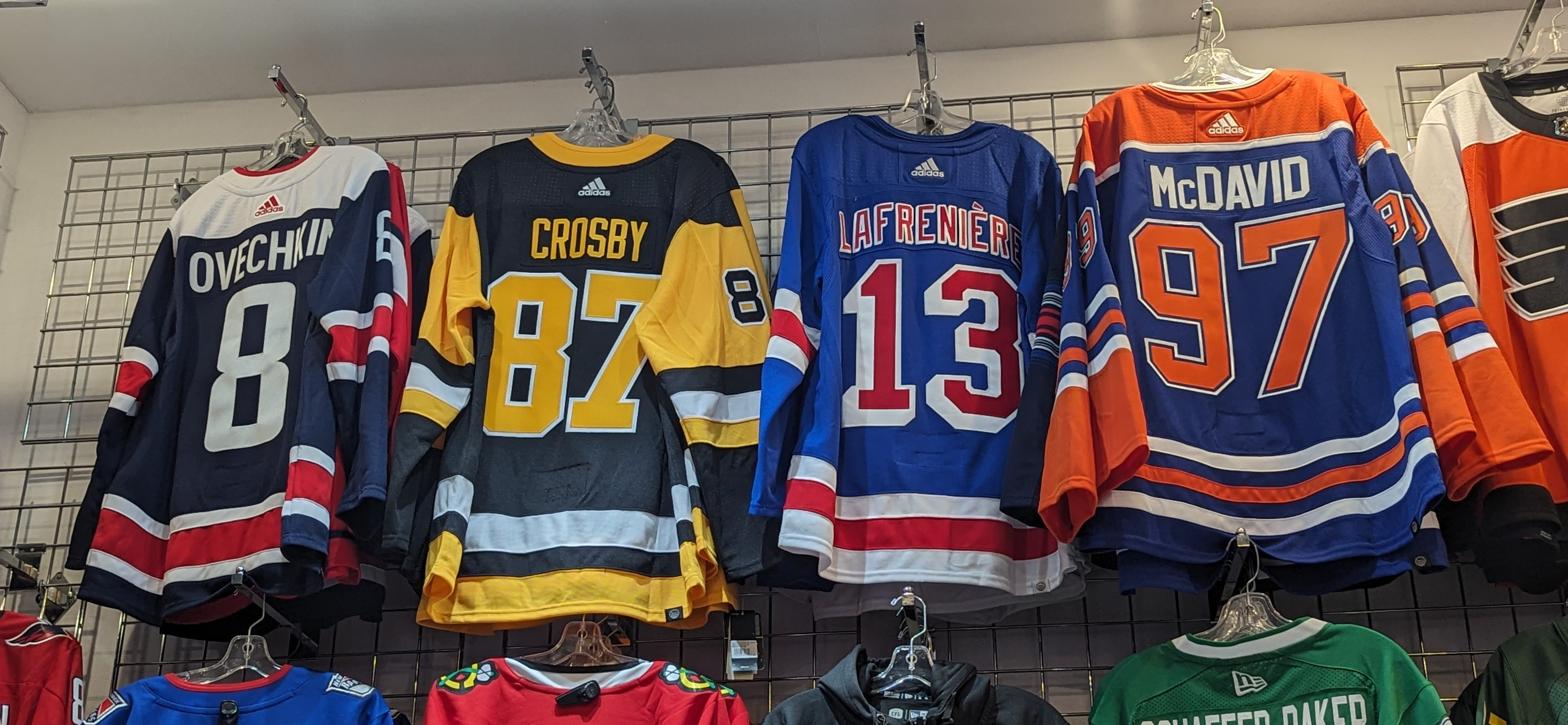
Fan versions of Hockey jerseys for sale

Hockey jerseys started to become more popular as a fashion choice with the general public starting with the expansion of teams like the San Jose Sharks and Mighty Ducks of Anaheim to southern California. As well as Wayne Gretzky being traded to the Los Angeles Kings around the same time. Jerseys started to be made with fashion in mind first at this time, with the NHL’s first alternate jersey program starting in 1995. The first alternate of the Edmonton Oilers introduced was meant to be worn by fans of the team and fans of fashion alike, and to speak to skater culture. It featured completely new elements such as bold new logos and the introduction of silver to the team. Hockey jerseys have sold well since. The Utah Mammoth set a record for the highest sales day in their shared arena when their jerseys first launched.

Starting in the early 2010's tossing a jersey onto the ice has become an extreme way of vocalizing displeasure with a team. This is seen mostly in Canada. It is done to show the fan is "giving up." The practice is mostly frowned upon, being seen as attention seeking. Maple Leaf Sports & Entertainment the owner of the Toronto Maple Leafs and their arena have banned and fined fans for throwing jerseys onto the ice.

Other sports have involved hockey jerseys in their promotions. Some MLB teams have hockey jersey nights where the team colours and logos are used to create hockey style jerseys for giveaways. The Toronto Blue Jays giveaway has seen major interest with long lines ahead of gate opening, breaking giveaway records, and high resale prices. Some pro wrestling heels will wear hockey jerseys in ring of the local teams rival or recent trades in order to elicit boos from the crowd. The NBA was used to tease the release of a new Seattle Kraken jersey in 2023.

There have been events that encourage people wearing hockey jerseys outside of areans, like USA Hockey hosting a "Hockey jersey day" encouraging fans to share their jerseys on social media. Chipotle has had meal deals for customers that come in wearing a hockey jersey on certain days.

==== Counterfeits ====
With the rise in popularity, counterfeit (commonly called fake) jerseys have become an issue for fans, collectors, and retailers. Consumers and the NHL are upset over the sales due to poor quality and a feeling of being taken advantage of, as some counterfeits can be close to the same price as authentics. On the manufacturing side there is also risks of child labour exploitations and lead in the materials due to the lack of proper inspections. Many news organizations have done segments to inform fans of signs of fakes, such as improper stitching, thinner materials, and missing holographic tags.

Over 1 million fake jerseys were sold online per year in a 2011 estimate by MarkMonitor. This number was estimated to be four times what it was at the NHL 08-09 season. The Montreal Canadiens have been hit hardest, with their team store having sales dropped by a third during this time. As team success goes up so does the rates of counterfeit merchandise, as during the 2015 Stanley cup final, the Chicago Blackhawks had over $180,000 worth of fake goods seized by Homeland Security. For the 2024-25 season back to back Stanley Cup finalists Florida Panthers and Edmonton Oilers were ranked first and second respectively in rates of negative conversations about counterfeit merch. The NHL has attempted to crack down on the selling of the fake jerseys, by teaming up with the NBA and MLB they had shut down over 1000 websites selling fake sports items.

=== Hip-hop and music culture ===
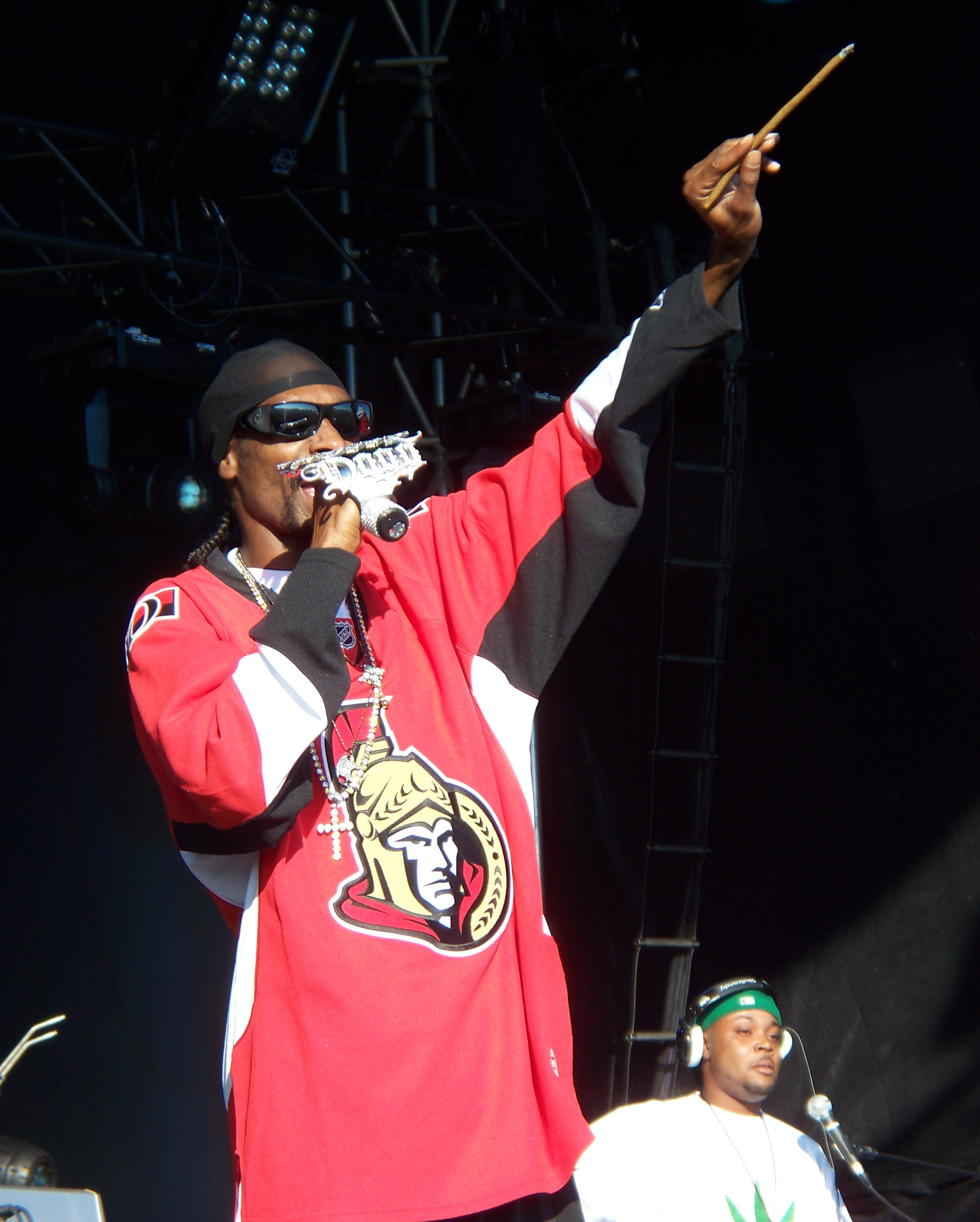
American rapper Snoop Dogg in an Ottawa Senators jersey.

In the mid 1990's hockey jerseys became popular in Hip-Hop culture. The first major appearance is from Snoop Dogg in his "Gin and Juice" music video. In it he is seen wearing a Pittsburgh Penguins jersey with "Gin and Juice" and the number 94 on the back. In other scenes in the music video he is wearing Springfield Indians jersey. In an interview with The Athletic, when asked why he chose to wear them, Snoop Dogg responded "I always thought that the hockey jerseys were fashionable and a good fit. No one in rap was really reppin them."

Hockey Jerseys also appeared in multiple other music videos during this time from artists such as Nas in "The World is Yours", A Tribe Called Quest in "Oh My God", LL Cool J in "Hey Lover", and Smif-N-Wessun in "BuckTown" and "Let's get it on." Tupac Shakur was seen wearing a Detroit Red Wings jersey in an infamous photo and video of him spitting at reporters while appearing to court.

In the late 2010’s there was a revival of the trend, with artists such as Drake and Post Malone wearing jerseys of local teams when performing tours. Artist SZA being from St. Louis has featured St. Louis Blues jerseys in many of her works, such as the cover of her grammy winning album S.O.S. and in a music video appearance for her feature on “Rich Baby Daddy”

The NHL has tried to capitalize on the revival of the trend, seen most with artist Justin Bieber and his Drew House brand collaborating with Adidas in 2022 to create the Toronto Maple Leafs “Flipside jersey.” The outside being a black Toronto jersey with blue accents and the Toronto skyline in silhouette on the sleeve. The jersey also has a feature when reversed inside-out being black with gold accents, and features a combination of the yellow Drew House smile logo, and the Leafs front crest. This collaboration would resume in 2024 when the NHL revealed Drew House inspired jerseys for the 2024 NHL All-Star game.

== See also ==
- Ice hockey equipment
- NHL uniform
- Barber's pole style sweaters
