= England national roller hockey team =

England national rollery hockey team

England
- Association: England Roller Hockey
- Confederation: World Skate Europe - Rink Hockey
- Head coach: (Portugal) Carlos Amaral

The England national roller hockey team is the national team side of England at international roller hockey. England started as the leading team in the sport, being the winner of the first 12 editions of the Rink Hockey European Championship, from 1927 to 1939, with the 1937 and 1939 editions also serving as Rink Hockey World Championship, but were unable to keep the same position after World War II. England reached the podium in 1947, when they finished in 2nd place, losing the title to Portugal. Since then, England has never been able to reach the same status of the past, being nowadays considered a minor team. England Rink Hockey has achieved some positive results in recent years, competing at the World Roller Games organised by World Skate and at European Championships organised by World Skate Europe - Rink Hockey.

== Titles ==
*Roller Hockey World Cup: 1936*, 1939* (2)

|

*Rink Hockey European Championship: 1926, 1927, 1928, 1929, 1930, 1931, 1932, 1934, 1936*, 1937, 1938, 1939*  (12) *also 

counting as World Championship |

*Nations Cup: 1923, 1924, 1925, 1927*, 1929*, 1931*, 1939*, 1950 (8)

- Euro Cup, World Cup and Nations Cup were the same in this year.

== National Teams ==
- Senior Men's
- Senior Women's
- Under 19 Men's
- Under 17 Men's
- Under 17 Ladies

== See also ==
- World Skate Europe - Rink Hockey
- U17 Female Club Tournament
