= Portugal national roller hockey team =

Portugal
- Nickname: Seleção das Quinas
- Association: Federação Portuguesa de Patinagem
- Confederation: World Skate Europe - Rink Hockey
- Head coach: Renato Garrido
- Captain: João Rodrigues
- Team colors
Home colours	Away colours

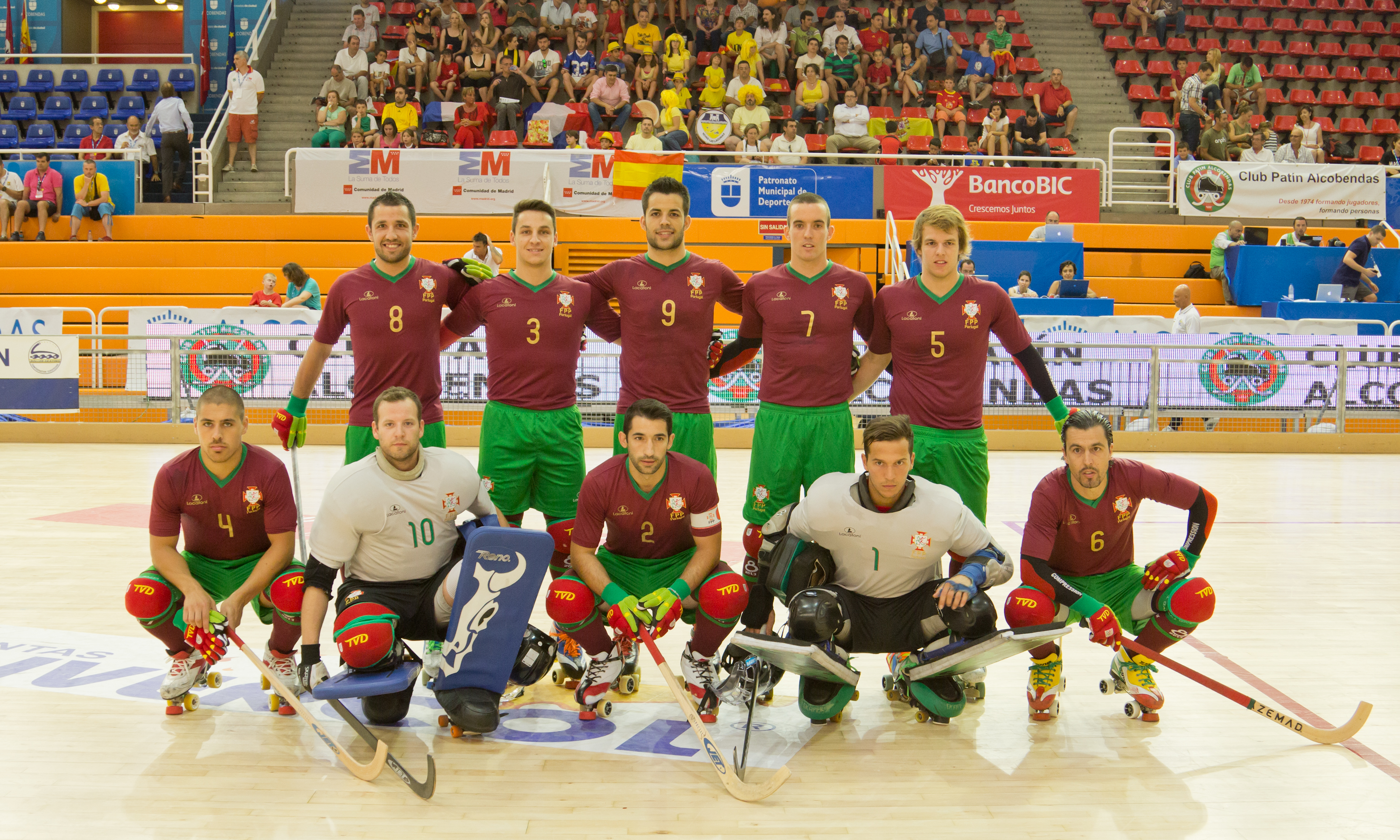
Portugal national team in 2014

The Portugal national roller hockey team is one of the most successful roller hockey teams of the world, along with Spain, Italy and Argentina.

Portugal has been a dominant power in the sport, holding the second most titles of the Rink Hockey World Championship, with 16, and most of the Rink Hockey European Championship, with 22.

The Portuguese national roller hockey team attracts significant public interest in Portugal, second to the football national team, due to its history of success and its association with players such as António Livramento and Vítor Hugo.

== History ==
=== From the origins to the 1930s ===
Rink hockey was introduced to Portugal in 1912. The first rink was built by Recreios Desportivos da Amadora, in Amadora. The first recorded match took place in 1912, between Recreios Desportivos da Amadora and Clube de Desportos de Benfica, in Amadora, ending in a 2–0 win for the visitors.

Cosme Damião, the "father" of Benfica, highly interested in the new sport, obtained the official rules from France, in 1916, translated to Portuguese by Raúl de Oliveira, then director of the newspaper O Mundo Desportivo. The same year, two Benfica sides played the first match according to the new rules in a rink in Lisbon.

The first official tournament in Portugal took place in 1917, involving 6 teams, one of them being Benfica.

The International Federation of Roller Skating in Wheels was founded in Montreux, Switzerland in April 1924.

The first ever Rink Hockey European Championship took place in Herne Bay, England, in 1926, it was contested by 6 countries. The host country won the event. Portugal's first appearance came in 1930, the squad contained all Benfica players. In 1932, Portugal finished in 4th place. Their first medal came in 1936, in Stuttgart, Germany, the event that was also considered the first ever Rink Hockey World Championship, when Portugal finished 3rd place, behind world champions, England, and Italy. In the 1937 Rink Hockey European Championship, Portugal repeated the 3rd place, a feat repeated in 1939, but the main international competitions were interrupted by World War II.

=== First golden era (1947–1956) ===
After the return of the Rink Hockey European Championship, still serving as the Rink Hockey World Championship, in 1947, Portugal saw the start of a new era in the history of rink hockey, where they would be the dominant power. Portugal won 6 of the 10 editions of the most important world rink hockey competition in the annual first phase of the event, until 1956. The first win came in 1947, in Lisbon, over Belgium, followed by wins in 1948, 1949 and 1950. Simultaneously, Portugal saw the rising of some of the best and most legendary Portuguese rink hockey players ever: Correia dos Santos, António Jesus Correia, Emídio Pinto, António Raio, Sidónio Serpa, Olivério Serpa and goalkeeper Cipriano Santos.

In 1951, Spain finally interrupted Portugal's win series, with their first title. Portugal won again the title in 1952 and 1956, finishing in second place in 1951, 1953 and 1954, and in third place in 1955.

=== Second golden era (1957–1978) ===
In 1957, both the Rink Hockey European Championship and the Rink Hockey World Championship become different competitions, taking place every two years and alternating with one another. This reorganization of the sport wouldn't make much difference to Portugal as it remained the dominant European power with 9 titles out of 11 championships, between 1957 and 1977, winning the European titles in 1959, 1961, 1963, 1965, 1967, 1971, 1973, 1975 and 1977 respectively. At the World Championships, Portugal would win 5 titles, 1958, 1960, 1962, 1968 and 1974 respectively, out of 11 participations . This new generation was dominated by players such as Fernando Adrião, José Vaz Guedes, Amadeu Bouçós, Júlio Rendeiro, Francisco Velasco, António Ramalhete, Manuel Carrello, Passos Viana, the 'Spiderman'/'Homem Aranha' goalkeeper Alberto Moreira and António Livramento. A curiosity of this generation, was the number of players provenient from Lourenço Marques now Maputo, in Mozambique, at the time, a Portuguese East Africa Overseas Province and since 1975, the independent Republic of Mozambique, such was the popularity of the sport in the Portuguese 'Universe'.

=== The 1980s ===
The growing emergence of Spain, Italy and Argentina resulted in a more competitive decade for the international scene of roller hockey. This explains why Portugal was capable of winning only one World Cup title in this decade, precisely in 1982 as hosts of the event and beating Spain 5–2 in the final in one of the most memorable editions of the tournament. The great Portuguese team was made up of "last chance talents" of ongoing veterans such as goalkeeper António Ramalhete, Cristiano Pereira and Chana, who had won the title of 1974. A new generation would emerge in the upcoming years but was unable to win the title of World Champions, managing 3rd place in the editions of 1984, 1986 and 1988. At the 1990 championship they reached the final, losing 1–0 to Argentina, with that 2nd place was their best World Championship performance until 1991. In Europe, Portugal won the 1987 Rink Hockey European Championship, finishing in 2nd place in 1981 and 1983. Meanwhile, a "change of the guard" gradually took place with the emergence of the great forward goalscorer Vítor Hugo as successor to António Livramento, while other greats such as Vítor Bruno, Carlos Realista and Franklim Pais made up the new ensemble.

=== The 1990s ===
The new decade witnessed Portugal winning their 11th title in the Rink Hockey World Championship after a nine years hiatus, when they defeated surprise finalists the Netherlands by 7–0 at Oporto in 1991. The new title seemed to confirm the tradition of winning the World Championship every time Portugal hosted the event. Portugal won the European Rink Championship of 1992 and in the following year Portugal won their second Rink Hockey World Championship in a row after defeating favourites Italy 1–0, in a penalty shoot out, something that had not happened since 1962, when they won three consecutive titles. In 1995, Portugal was unable to reach their third title in a row after losing the semi-final to Argentina in Recife, Brazil. Meanwhile, in Europe, Portugal won four Rink Hockey European Championships in a row, 1992, 1994, 1996 and 1998. Since then the sport has been dominated by Spain. After 1995, Portugal hasn't managed to reach any finals of the World Championship, finishing in 4th in 1997, 3rd in 1999, and ending the 2001 edition in 4th place. The main protagonists of this time were Filipe Santos, Guilherme Silva, José Carlos Califórnia, Luís Ferreira, Paulo Almeida, Paulo Alves, Pedro Alves, Rui Lopes, Tó Neves and Vítor Fortunato

=== The new millennium ===
The first decade of the 21st century has been dominated by Spain on a World and European level in international rink hockey. Portugal, after a 4th-place finish in the 2001 edition of the World Championship, was able to win the 2003 tournament, in which they were hosts, defeating Italy in the final 1–0, while Spain finished in 3rd place. In 2005, Portugal disappointed when Argentina won the event for the fourth time, defeating Spain in the final, and leaving them with 3rd place. The 2007 edition will always be remembered as the worst performance ever for Portugal and the first time they didn't finish among the four best teams. In fact, Portugal, coached by Paulo Batista, was eliminated by Switzerland in the quarter-finals, and lost the 5th place match to France, finishing only in 6th place. This result caused great controversy in Portugal and resulted in the immediate sacking of coach Paulo Batista. With the new coach, Luís Sénica, Portugal, who had lost the 2000 and 2002 European Championship finals to Spain, narrowly lost the 2008 final to Spain by 1–0, with a controversially disallowed goal scored by Reinaldo Ventura. Adopting the nickname of "Os Ursos" ("The Bears"), Portugal was seen as a major contender for the 2009 World Championship title, but lost in the semi-final to Argentina (3-1), once again finishing 3rd place, after an 8–3 win over Brazil. Luís Sénica was later replaced by Rui Neto, who led the National Team to the 2010 European Rink Hockey European Championship. Portugal began in very good form, easily winning their group, in the quarter-final they demolished Austria 23–0, followed by a 6–1 victory over Germany in the semi-final, but collapsed in the final, once again to Spain, in a game that began evenly matched, but ended with an 8-2 Spain win. Portugal was also unfortunate at the 2011 Rink Hockey World Championship, once again finishing in 3rd place, being eliminated by Argentina in the semi-final by 4-3 and defeating Mozambique by 9-2 for the bronze medal. Spain would defeat Argentina to win their 15th World Championship, tying Portugal for most ever world titles. In the 2013 Roller Hockey World Championship, held in Angola, Portugal once again finished in the 3rd place, after a 1–0 loss to Argentina in the semi-finals. Spain would win their 16th title by winning Argentina 4–3 in the final, surpassing Portugal in the number of titles, while Portugal would easily defeat Chile by 10–3 to claim a disappointing 3rd place. In 2016, Portugal won the European Championship with a 6–2 victory against Italy in the finals. In 2017, Portugal lost the World Championship finals to Spain, by losing in the penalties 2–1, after a 3–3 draw in regular time. In 2019, Portugal won the World Championship by beating Argentina in the final in the penalties 2–1, after a 0–0 draw in regular time.

== Titles ==
Titles gained
Competition	Total	Years
World Championship	16	1947, 1948, 1949, 1950, 1952, 1956, 1958, 1960, 1962, 1968, 1974, 1982, 1991, 1993, 2003, 2019
European Championship	22	1947*, 1948*, 1949*, 1950*, 1952*, 1956*, 1959, 1961, 1963, 1965, 1967, 1971, 1973, 1975, 1977, 1987, 1992, 1994, 1996, 1998, 2016, 2025 * also counted as World Championship
Nations Cup	19	1948, 1949, 1954, 1955, 1956, 1963, 1965, 1968, 1970, 1973, 1984, 1987, 1994, 1997, 2009, 2010, 2011, 2013, 2015, 2019
World Games	4	1981, 1989, 1993, 2001
Golden Cat	3	2023, 2024, 2025
Latin Cup	14	1957, 1959, 1960, 1961, 1962, 1988, 1989, 1998, 2001, 2002, 2003, 2008, 2014, 2016
FIRS Roller Hockey World Cup U-20	4	2003, 2013, 2015, 2017
