= Switzerland national roller hockey team =

Switzerland
- Association: Swiss Roller Hockey Federation
- Confederation: CERH
Home colours	Away colours

Ranking
- Ranking: 10

The Swiss national roller hockey team is the national team side of Switzerland at international roller hockey. Usually it takes part in the FIRS Roller Hockey World Cup and CERH European Roller Hockey Championship.

== Swiss squad - 50th Euro Cup ==
Goaltenders
#	Player	Hometown	Club
1
Field Players
#	Player	Hometown	Club

== Titles ==
- Silver Roller Hockey World Cup (1):2007
- Silver European Roller Hockey Championship (2): 1937, 2006
