= France national roller hockey team =

France
- Association: France Roller Sports Federation
- Confederation: CERH
- Head coach: Fabien Savreux
- Captain: Sébastien Landrin
Home colours	Away colours

Ranking
- Ranking: 5

The France national roller hockey team is the national team side of France at international roller hockey. Usually it is part of FIRS Roller Hockey World Cup and CERH European Roller Hockey Championship.

== France squad - 64th Nations Cup ==
Goaltenders
#	Player	Hometown	Club
1	Gaëtan Guillomet
10	Olivier Gelebart
Field Players
#	Player	Hometown	Club
2	Loïc Le Menn
3	Sébastien Furstenberger
4	Omar Nedder
5	Florent David
6	Anthony Weber
7	Sébastien Landrin (Captain)
8	Nicolas Guilbert
9	Sébastien Cano

Team Staff

- General Manager: Philippe Aubre
- General Manager: Dan Mortreux
- Physiotherapist: Hedi Ben Brahim

Coaching Staff

- Head Coach: Fabien Savreux
- Assistant: Thierry Cadet

== Titles ==
- Champions Roller Hockey World Cup (1):2026
- Runners-up European Roller Hockey Championship (7):1926,1927,1928,1930,1931,2021,2025
