= Netherlands national roller hockey team =

Netherlands
- Association: Netherlands Federation of Roller Sports
- Confederation: CERH
- Head coach: Freddy Grysaels

Ranking
- Ranking: 17

The Netherlands national roller hockey team is the national team side of Netherlands at international roller hockey. Usually is part of FIRS Roller Hockey B World Cup and CERH European Roller Hockey Championship.

== Netherlands squad - 2010 FIRS Roller Hockey B World Cup ==
Goaltenders
#	Player	Hometown	Club
1	Joey Van Den Dungen
Harold De Wit
Field Players
#	Player	Hometown	Club
Luuk Bischoff
Rudy Van Deursen
Niels Janssen
Kevin Van Der Kloster
Robbie Van Dooren
Arjan Van Gerven
Lowie Boogers
Michel Van Geme

Team Staff

- General Manager:Martin Van Lieshout
- General Manager:Anton Sorensen

Coaching Staff

- Head Coach: Freddy Grysaels
- Assistant: Martyn Baeten

== Titles ==
- Silver Roller Hockey World Cup (1):1991
