= Italy men's national roller hockey team =

Italy
- Nickname(s): La Squadra Azzurra (The Blue Team)
- Association: Federazione Italiana de Hockey i Pattinaggio
- Confederation: World Skate Europe
- Head coach: Massimo Mariotti
Home colours	Away colours

Italy men's national roller hockey team is the national team side of Italy at international roller hockey.

== Honours ==
Competition	1st place, gold medalist(s)	2nd place, silver medalist(s)	3rd place, bronze medalist(s)	Total
Olympic Games	0	0	1	1
World Championship	4	8	10	22
European Championship	3	11	20	33
World Games	1	0	1	2
Mediterranean Games	1	0	0	1
Total	9	19	32	60
