= 2013 FIRS Roller Hockey World Cup U-20 =

2013 FIRS Roller Hockey World Cup U-20 and 2013 Cartagena

Tournament details
- Host country: Colombia
- Dates: 5–12 October
- Teams: 17 (from 4 confederations)
- Venue(s): Cartagena (in cartagena host cities)

Final positions
- Champions: Portugal (2nd title)
- Runners-up: Spain
- Third place: Argentina
- Fourth place: France

Tournament statistics
- Matches played: 54
- Top scorer(s): (Italy) Alessandro Verona (21)

The 2013 FIRS Roller Hockey World Cup U-20 was the 6th edition of the FIRS Roller Hockey World Cup U-20. It was held in October 2013 in Cartagena, Colombia. Portugal won its second title.

== Venues ==
Medellin, Colombia was the host city of the tournament.

== Group stage ==
=== Group A ===
Team	Pld	W	D	L	GF	GA	GD	Pts	ESP	COL	ENG	URU	MAC
Spain	4	4	0	0	36	3	+33	12			10–1	9–0	
Colombia	4	3	0	1	31	5	+26	9	2–3		6–2	10–0	13–0
England	4	2	0	2	25	18	+7	6				8–2	
Uruguay	4	1	0	3	12	28	−16	3					
Macau	4	0	0	4	1	51	−50	0	0–14		0–14	1–10	

=== Group B ===
Team	Pld	W	D	L	GF	GA	GD	Pts	POR	ANG	ZAF	ISR
Portugal	3	3	0	0	33	3	+30	9		7–2	16–1	10–0
Angola	3	2	0	1	13	10	+3	6				
South Africa	3	1	0	2	5	25	−20	3		1–7		3–2
Israel	3	0	0	3	4	17	−13	0		2–4		

6 October 2013
11:30 (UTC-5)

Portugal	16-1	South Africa
Alexandre Marques 'Xanoca' (5); Diogo Neves (4); João Paulo Candeias (3); Hélder Nunes (1); Miguel Vieira 'Vieirinha' (1); Xavier Cardoso 'Xavi' (1); Pedro Cerqueira (1)

7 October 2013
21:30 (UTC-5)

Portugal	7-2	Angola
Luís Cerqueira (3); Hélder Nunes (2); Diogo Neves; João Candeias		1-1 Zigga 1s Hf; 2-2 Nº9 1st Hf

8 October 2013
14:00 (UTC-5)

Portugal	10-0	Israel
1-0 Hélder Nunes; 2-0 Hélder Nunes; 3-0 Xavier Cardoso; 4-0 Alexandre Marques; 5-0 Diogo Seixas; 6-0 Vieirinha; 7-0 Diogo Neves; 8-0 Pedro Cerqueira; 9-0 Xavier Cardoso; 10-0 João Candeias

=== Group C ===
Team	Pld	W	D	L	GF	GA	GD	Pts	ITA	CHI	USA	CRC
Italy	3	3	0	0	66	6	+60	9		7–6	19–0	40–0
Chile	3	2	0	1	32	7	+25	6			17–0	
United States	3	1	0	2	9	37	−28	3				
Costa Rica	3	0	0	3	1	55	−54	0		0–9	1–9	

=== Group D ===
Team	Pld	W	D	L	GF	GA	GD	Pts	ARG	FRA	BRA	IND
Argentina	3	3	0	0	43	3	+40	9		5–1	3–1	35–1
France	3	2	0	1	31	8	+23	6			4–2	
Brazil	3	1	0	2	14	7	+7	3				
India	3	0	0	3	2	72	−70	0		1–26	0–11	

== Knockout stage ==
=== Championship ===
Quarterfinals
G	Spain	11
33	Angola	0
G	Argentina	2
36	Chile	0
G	Colombia	3
34	Portugal	5
G	Italy	5 (2 gp)
35	France	5 (3 gp)

Semifinals
G	Spain	2
44	Argentina	1
G	Portugal	6
45	France	0

Finals
F1	Spain	1
F2	Portugal	4
3rd place
C1	Argentina	5
C2	France	3

==== Games ====
Quarter-Final

10 October 2013
20:00 (UTC-5)

Colombia	3-5	Portugal
		1-1 Diogo Neves 1st Hf; 1-2 Diogo Neves 1st Hf; 1-3 Diogo Neves 1st Hf; 1-4 Diogo Neves 2nd Hf; 2-5 Helder Nunes 2nd Hf

Semi-Finals

11 October 2013
21:00 (UTC-5)

Spain	2-1	Argentina
1-0 Ignasi Lopez 14' 1st Hf; 2-0 David Martinez 4' 2nd Hf		2-1 Julian Tamborindegui 18' 2nd Hf

11 October 2013
22:30 (UTC-5)

Portugal	6-0	France
1-0 Pedro Cerqueira 10' 1st Hf; 2-0 João Candeias 2nd Hf; 3-0 Pedro Cerqueira 2nd Hf; 4-0 João Candeias 2nd Hf; 5-0 Diogo Seixas 2nd Hf; 6-0 Miguel "Vieirinha" Vieira 2nd Hf

Final

12 October 2013
21:00 (UTC-5)

Spain	1-4	Portugal
1-4 David Torres GP 2nd Hf		0-1 Diogo Neves 1st Hf; 0-2 Pedro Cerqueira 1st Hf; 0-3 Diogo Seixas 2nd Hf; 0-4 Diogo Neves 2ªP

=== 5th-8th place ===
Qualifiers
Angola	2
Chile	5
Colombia	2
Italy	6

5th Place Game
Chile	1
Italy	7
7th Place Game
Angola	3
Colombia	4

=== 9th-16th place ===
Quarterfinals
G	England	2
29	Israel	1
G	Brazil	10
32	Costa Rica	1
G	South Africa	5
30	Uruguay	4
G	United States	8
31	India	1

Semifinals
G	England	3
35	Brazil	4
G	South Africa	2
36	United States	4

9th place
F1	Brazil	11
F2	United States	2
11th place
C1	England	8
C2	South Africa	2

=== 13th-14th place ===
Qualifier
G	Israel	14
37	Costa Rica	0
G	Uruguay	6
38	India	1

13th Place Game
G	Israel	8 (9 et)
47	Uruguay	8 (8 et)

=== 15th-17th Place ===
Team	Pld	W	D	L	GF	GA	GD	Pts	IND	MAC	CRC
India	2	2	0	0	21	6	+15	6		5–4	
Macau	2	1	0	1	14	5	+9	3			
Costa Rica	2	0	0	2	2	26	−24	0	2–16	0–10	

== Final standing ==
Rank	Team
1st place, gold medalist(s)	Portugal
2nd place, silver medalist(s)	Spain
3rd place, bronze medalist(s)	Argentina
4	France
5	Italy
6	Chile
7	Colombia
8	Angola
9	Brazil
10	United States
11	England
12	South Africa
13	Israel
14	Uruguay
15	India
16	Macau
17	Costa Rica

2013 FIRS Roller Hockey World Cup U-20 champions
PORTUGAL
Second title
