= 2012 FIRS Men's B-Roller Hockey World Cup =

2012 FIRS B-World Cup
Tournament details
- Host country: Uruguay
- Dates: 24 November – 1 December
- Teams: (from 4 confederations)
- Venue: (in Canelones host cities)

Final positions
- Champions: South Africa (1st title)
- Runners-up: England
- Third place: Austria
- Fourth place: Uruguay

Tournament statistics
- Matches played: 34
- Goals scored: 281 (8.26 per match)
- Top scorer: (Macau) Hélder Ricardo

The 2012 FIRS B-World Cup was the 15th edition of the Roller Hockey B World Championship, . This is an Official competition organized by CIRH. The competition was hosted in Canelones, Uruguay from 24 November to 1 December.

== Venues ==
Canelones was the host city of the tournament, and the Rink was enclosed the Sergio Matto stadium.

== Matches ==
All times are Uruguay Time (UTC-3).

=== Group stage ===
==== Group A ====
Team	Pld	W	D	L	GF	GA	GD	Pts
Austria	3	3	0	0	10	3	+7	9
Netherlands	3	2	0	1	11	7	+4	6
Macau	3	1	0	2	13	17	−4	3
Israel	3	0	0	3	5	13	−8	0

November 25, 2012
18:00

Austria	4-3	Macau
Manuel Parfant (3), David Huber		Helder Alhada Ricardo (2), Augusto Fernandes

November 25, 2012
19:30

Netherlands	3-0	Israel
Niels Janssens (1), Jeroen Dwars (2)

November 26, 2012
18:00

Austria	4-0	Israel
David Huber (4)

November 26, 2012
19:30

Netherlands	8-5	Macau
Luuk Bischoff (2), Ricardo Van Den Heuvel, Niels Janssens, Jeroen Dwars (4)		Hélder Ricardo (3), Augusto Fernandes (2)

November 27, 2012
18:00

Macau	6-5	Israel
Helder Ricardo (5), Nuno Antunes		Urile Lirman, Lior Uliel, Doron Raz (2), Shon Kurland

November 27, 2012

Netherlands	0-2	Austria
		David Huber, Manuel Parfant

==== Group B ====
Team	Pld	W	D	L	GF	GA	GD	Pts
South Africa	4	4	0	0	23	9	+14	12
England	4	2	0	2	18	12	+6	6
Uruguay	4	2	0	2	19	15	+4	6
Egypt	4	2	0	2	16	22	−6	6
Mexico	4	0	0	4	15	33	−18	0

November 24, 2012
21:00

Uruguay	9-5	Mexico
Claudio Maeso (4), Juan Manuel Campana (3), Martín Battistoni (1), Yonathan Velasco (1)		Miguel González, José Macías, David Castellano, Juan González, Carlos González

Attendance: 1200

November 25, 2012
10:00

Egypt	4-3	England
Karim Abdelaal (2), Mohanad Salah Eldin (2)

November 25, 2012
16:30

Mexico	2-7	South Africa

November 25, 2012
21:00

Uruguay	5-2	Egypt
Juan Manuel Campana, Claudio Maeso (4)		Karem Abdelal, Mostafa Elsayed

November 26, 2012
10:00

England	3-4	South Africa
William Smith Jack Pinheiro (2)		Leandro Arujo (3), Claudio Araujo

November 26, 2012
11:30

Egypt	9-6	Mexico
Waleed Mohamed, Samy Ahmed (2), Karim Abdelaal, Mostafa Bdelhadey (3), Mohamed Salah Eldin (2)		Miguel González (2), Carlos González (3), José Francisco Macías

November 26, 2012
21:00

Uruguay	2-4	England
Choco Velasco, Claudio Maeso		Stewart Owen (2), William Smith, John Jones

November 27, 2012
10:00

Egypt	1-8	South Africa
Ahmed Salan		Leandro Araujo (3), Claudio Araujo (2), Nelson Mendes, Michael Guerra, Ricardo De Sousa

November 27, 2012
11:30

Mexico	2-8	England
Carlos Francisco González, José Francisco Macías		Stewart Owen (4), Grant Zaccaria (2), Dan Butcher, Wiliam Smith

November 27, 2012
21:00

Uruguay	3-4	South Africa
Mauro Corbo, Juan Manel Campana, Claudio Maeso		Ricardo De Sousa, Leandro Araujo, Michael Guerra, Claudio Araujo

== Knockout stage ==
=== Championship ===
Quarter-finals
28 November – Canelones
Netherlands	2
Uruguay	6
28 November – Canelones
England	3
Macau	1
28 November – Canelones
Austria	4
Egypt	1
28 November – Canelones
South Africa	5
Israel	0

Semi-finals
30 November – Canelones
England	6
Austria	2
30 November – Canelones
Uruguay	1
South Africa	6

Final
1 December – Canelones
England	3
South Africa	4
Third place
1 December – Canelones
Uruguay	1
Austria	3

=== Quarterfinals ===
November 28, 2012
16:00

England	3-1	Macau
Owen Stewart (3)		Paulo Antunes

November 28, 2012
17:30

Austria	4-1	Egypt
Stefan Sahcer (2), Jacob Stockinger, Manuel Parfant		Karim Abdelaal

November 28, 2012
19:00

South Africa	5-0	Israel
Claudio Araujo (2), Leandro Araujo (2), Ricardo de Sousa

November 28, 2012
20:30

Netherlands	2-6	Uruguay
Luuk Bischoff, Jeroen Dwars		Claudio Maeso (3), Martín Battistoni (2), Mauro Corbo

Attendance: 1200

=== Semifinals ===
November 30, 2012
19:30

England	6-2	Austria
Owen Stewart (3), William Smith (2), Grant Zaccaria		Manuel Parfant (2)

November 30, 2012
21:00

Uruguay	1-6	South Africa
Claudio Maeso		Leandro Araujo (2), Ricardo De Sousa (2), Adilson Correia, Claudio Araujo

=== 3rd/4th Place ===
December 1, 2012
17:00

Uruguay	1-3	Austria

=== Final ===
December 1, 2012
18:30

England	3-4	South Africa
Owen Stewart, Dan Butcher, John Jones

=== 5th–9th playoff ===
Team	Pld	W	D	L	GF	GA	GD	Pts
Netherlands	4	4	0	0	24	13	+11	12
Macau	4	3	0	1	25	16	+9	9
Israel	4	3	0	1	23	13	+10	9
Mexico	4	1	0	3	18	28	−10	3
Egypt	4	0	0	4	13	33	−20	0

29 November

Netherlands	7-4	Mexico
Jeroen Dwards (5), Nicky Luiteiler (2)		Carlos González (2), José Macías, Miguel González

29 November

Macau	8-5	Egypt
Helder Ricardo (4), Nuno Antunes (2), Dionísio da Luz, Ricardo Atraca		Mohanad Salah Eldin (2), Karim Ahmed Abdelaal (2), Ahmed Salan, Mohamed Mamdouh Hassan

29 November

Israel	10-3	Mexico
Uri Lirman (4), Shon Kurland (3), Saar Sharon (1), Marcelo Bendersky (1), Lior Uliel (1)

29 November

Netherlands	5-3	Macau
		Hélder Ricardo, Nuno Antunes, Ricardo Atraca

30 November
9:00

Israel	10-0	Egypt
Tomer Levi (10)

30 November
10:30

Macau	7-5	Mexico

30 November
18:00

Netherlands	9-4	Egypt

30 November
22:30

Macau	7-1	Israel

1 December
14:00

Mexico	6-4	Egypt

1 December
15:30

Netherlands	3-2	Israel
		Lior, Uri

== Final ranking ==
Pos.	Country	
1.	South Africa	qualified to WC 2013
2.	England	qualified to WC 2013
3.	Austria	qualified to WC 2013
4.	Uruguay	
5.	Netherlands	
6.	Macau	
7.	Israel	
8.	Mexico	
9.	Egypt	
