= Honourific Title of Merit =

Honourific Title of Merit Título Honorífico de Valor 功績獎狀
- Awarded for: selflessness and bravery, as well as dedication to noble causes, in the exercise of public functions.
- Presented by: Macau
- Established: 2001
- First award: 2001

The Honourific Title of Merit (Portuguese: Título Honorífico de Valor; Chinese: 功績獎狀; pinyin: Gōngjī jiǎngzhuàng) is a decoration of Macau established in 2001 in recognition of individuals who have contributed significantly to the Macau Special Administrative Region of the People's Republic of China.

== List of Winners ==
Year	Winners
2001	Ung Vai Meng
2001	Rui Paulo da Silva Martins
2001	Han Jing
2001	André Couto
2002	Joe Lei
2002	Cheung Pui Si
2002	Wong Pak Cheong
2002	Kwan Man Fei
2002	Sou Wai Leong (Pedro Sou)
2002	Macau Culinary Association
2003	Sin Kuan Mui
2003	Leong I Mei
2003	Leong Lai Sze Racy
2003	Chan Sin Leng
2003	Mak Seng Hin
2003	Hon Peng Wa
2003	Lio Kuok Man
2003	Lio Kuok Wai
2003	Pun Chi Fai
2003	Che Weng Io
2003	Special Olympics Macau
2004	João António da Silva Madeira da Fonseca
2004	Rodolfo Ávila
2004	Lei Nga Weng
2004	Vítor Hugo dos Santos Marreiros
2004	Leong Ka Weng
2004	Hoi Kin Wa
2004	Chan Fai-young
2004	Huang Qing Yi
2005	Wong Wing Cheung Victor
2005	Qin Zhijian
2005	Au Wai Hong
2005	Cheong Chi Un
2005	Chen Zijun
2005	Mak Pui In
2005	Vong Heong Lon
2005	Yang Houqin
2005	Jia Rui
2005	Paula Cristina Pereira Carion
2005	Chong Ka Lap
2005	Kuan Sok Mui
2005	Macau Women's dragon boat team at the 2005 East Asian Games
2005	Macau Men's dragon boat team at the 2005 East Asian Games
2005	Macau national roller hockey team at the 2005 Roller Hockey Asia Cup
2006	Chu Chi Wai
2006	Ho Si Hang
2006	Lei Nam
2006	Lei Hong Chan
2006	Pun Lai Fan
2006	Macau Friends of Charity Association
2007	Wong Hang Cheong
2007	Xi Cheng Qing
2007	Ieong Hou Un
2007	Cheang Chi Wai
2007	Macau lion dance team at the 2007 Asian Indoor Games
2007	Macau Association for the Mentally Handicapped
2007	Hou Kong Middle School Marching Band
2008	Lei On Kei
2008	Ng Wai Hou
2008	Au Kuan Cheong
2008	Leong Ka Chon
2008	Chan Io Tong
2008	Paulo Duarte Gomes de Senna Fernandes
2008	Kuan Sok In
2008	Macau Association for the Mentally Handicapped
2008	Travel Agency of Macau
2008	Tourism Agency of Macau
2008	Travel Industry Council of Macau
2009	Wang Junnam
2009	Ng João Seng Hong
2009	Lei Weng Si
2009	Kou Man I
2009	Hoi Long
2009	Zhang Shaoling
2009	Zhang Dan
2009	Zhang Zhibo
2009	Cheong Chi Fun
2009	Van Ka Lok
2009	Fong In Hong
2009	Liu Xia
2009	Lo Heng Kong
2009	Soler – Dino and Julio Acconci
2010	Yu Seng Pan
2010	Lei Kuong Cheong
2010	Chao Man Hou
2010	Choi Sut Ian
2010	Leong Ka Weng
2010	Wong Weng Man
2010	Macau team at the Secondary Education Mathematics Contest in the United States
2011	Ho Man Fai
2011	Ng Wing Mui
2011	Hong Ka I
2011	Wu Nok In
2011	Ngou Pok Man
2011	Lio Chon Hou
2011	Chio Wai Keong
2011	New Life Christian Fellowship of Macau for the fight against drugs among young people
2012	Wong Ka Fai
2012	Li Yi
2012	Lao Kun Wa
2012	Che Ngan Ngan
2012	Sou Chin Pang
2012	Macau national roller hockey team at the 2012 Asian Roller Hockey Cup
2012	Macao Youth Artistic Ability Volunteer Association
2013	Che Chon Seng
2013	Wong Ka Fai
2013	Tan Chih Wei
2013	Iao Chon In
2013	Chong Ka Seng
2013	Kuok Kin Hang
2013	Feng Xiao
2013	Liu Qing
2013	Cai Aolong
2014	Choi Sut Ian
2014	Chao Man Hou
2014	Macau diving team
2014	Li Yi
2014	Huang Junhua
2014	Cheung Pui Si
2014	Paula Cristina Pereira Carion
2014	Liu Qing
2014	Wang Junnan
2014	Chan Ian Weng
2014	Lo Kin Ian
2014	Cheong Wai Hang
2014	Chao Koi Wang
2015	Loi Im Lan
2015	Chau Hou Tin
2015	Chao Ka Hei
2015	Ma Leng
2015	Zhang Qingwen
2015	Cheong Sio In
2015	Sou Ka Fong
2015	Cai Jia Qi
2015	Macau team at the Secondary Education Mathematics Contest in the United States
2015	Sub-aquatic Robotics team at the Pui Ching Middle School
2015	University of Macau Swimming Team
2016	School for Sons and Brothers of Workers of Macau, for the Friction Force Measurements project
2016	School for Sons and Brothers of Workers of Macau, for carrying out the Eco-Purifying Portable Water Project
2016	Lei Kuan Hou
2016	Lei Wai Shing
2017	Cheong Heong San
2017	Lam Kai Heng
2017	Chan Sio Man
2017	Chau Hou Tin
2017	Pui Ching Middle School
2018	Lam Oi Man
2018	U Choi Hong
2018	Pui Ching Middle School at the 2018 International Science and Engineering Fair
2018	Leong Leng Wai
2019	Pui Ching Middle School at the 2019 International Science and Engineering Fair
2019	Pui Ching Middle School special prize awarded by the China Association for Science and Technology
2019	The Affiliated School of the University of Macau at the 2019 International Science and Engineering Fair
2019	Objective Refractory Development Team for Simple Diagnosis of Myopia in Students
2019	Fong Hok Kin
2019	Ho Kai Pong
2019	Wong Sam In
2019	Cheang Lok In
2019	Lao Chio Long
2019	Cheong Tsz Kin
2019	Cheong Chi Chong
2020	Anti-pandemic work team in Africa
2020	Team which retrieved stranded Macao residents in Hubei
2020	Team which retrieved stranded Macao residents on the Diamond Princess
2021	Chen Yu Chia
2021	Chen Pui Lam
2022	Chan Pak Ian
2022	Choi Ka Wai
2023	A color analyzer based on the principle of color mixing Participating team of the Pui Ching Middle School
2023	An ointment that quickly heals a wound - the secret hidden between the soil and the flowers Participating team of the Hou Kong Middle School
2023	Lao Lok Iao
2023	Huang Junhua
2023	U Choi Hong
2023	Song Chi Kuan
2023	Wong Chan Wai
2023	Lin Yuxiang
