= 2015 FIRS Men's Roller Hockey World Cup =

Tournament details
- Host country: France
- City: La Roche-sur-Yon
- Dates: 20 – 27 June 2015
- Teams: 16 (from 3 confederations)
- Venue: 1 (in 1 host city)

Final positions
- Champions: Argentina (5th title)
- Runners-up: Spain
- Third place: Portugal
- Fourth place: Germany

Tournament statistics
- Matches played: 48
- Goals scored: 393 (8.19 per match)
- Top scorer(s): (Italy) Massimo Tataranni (14 goals)

The 2015 FIRS Men's Roller Hockey World Cup was the 42nd edition of the Roller Hockey World Cup, organised by the Fédération Internationale de Roller Sports (FIRS). The tournament was held for the first time in France, in the city of La Roche-sur-Yon, from 20 to 27 June 2015.

== Qualification ==
=== Qualified nations ===
Competition	Date	Venue	Berths	Qualified
2013 FIRS Men's Roller Hockey World Cup	September 20 – 28, 2013	Angola	13	Spain; Argentina; Portugal; Chile; Italy; Brazil; Mozambique; France; Angola; Switzerland; Germany; South Africa; Colombia
2014 FIRS Men's B-Roller Hockey World Cup	November 15 – 22, 2014	Uruguay	3	Austria; England; Netherlands
Total			16	

== Venues ==
The games of the tournament were played in La Roche-sur-Yon.

La Roche-sur-Yon	La Roche-sur-Yon is located in France
Vendéspace	La Roche-sur-Yon is located in France
Capacity: 4,900	La Roche-sur-Yon is located in France

== Squads ==
Each team submitted a squad of 10 players, including two goalkeepers.

== Draw ==
The 16 teams were divided in four groups, each group with four teams.

== First round ==
The group winners and runners up advanced to the round of 16. The third and fourth places advanced to a series of playoff matches to determine the final standings.

All times are France Summer Time (UTC+02:00).

=== Group A ===
Team	Pld	W	L	GF	GA	GD	Pts
Spain	3	3	0	20	2	+18	9
France	3	2	1	11	7	+4	6
Angola	3	1	2	9	6	+3	3
Netherlands	3	0	3	2	27	−25	0

20 June 2015
17:50

Angola	7 – 2	Netherlands
Pinto 4', 32'; Payero 6', 11', 25'; Centeno 18'; Fernandes 29'		E. Vives 2', 16'

Vendéspace, La Roche-sur-Yon

20 June 2015
21:15

France	1 – 6	Spain
Di Benedetto 29'		Gual 5', 15', 20', 39'; J. Lamas 21', 31'

Vendéspace, La Roche-sur-Yon

21 June 2015
17:40

Spain	1 – 1 (a.e.t.)	Angola
Gil 7'		Johe 33'
Penalties
Gual (penalty missed); Gil (penalty missed); Pérez (penalty scored); E. Lamas (penalty scored)	2 – 0	(penalty missed) Payero; (penalty missed) Johe; (penalty missed) Bernardino; (penalty missed) Fernandes

Vendéspace, La Roche-sur-Yon

21 June 2015
21:15

Netherlands	0 – 7	France
		Di Benedetto 7', 9', 16', 37'; Le Roux 29'; Herman 35', 39'

Vendéspace, La Roche-sur-Yon

23 June 2015
16:00

Spain	12 – 0	Netherlands
Gual 5'; Adroher 5', 12', 30', 36', 39'; J. Lamas 20'; E. Lamas 23'; Gil 29', 36', 38'; Baliu 40'

Vendéspace, La Roche-sur-Yon

23 June 2015
21:15

France	3 – 1	Angola
David 28'; Weber 38'; Di Benedetto 40'		Pinto 3'

Vendéspace, La Roche-sur-Yon

=== Group B ===
Team	Pld	W	L	GF	GA	GD	Pts
Argentina	3	3	0	20	6	+14	9
Mozambique	3	2	1	13	9	+4	6
Switzerland	3	1	2	9	11	−2	3
England	3	0	3	5	21	−16	0

20 June 2015
14:30

Argentina	7 – 1	Switzerland
Platero 4'; Nicolia 12'; López 16'; R. García 28'; J. García 38', 40', 40'		Vanina 39'

Vendéspace, La Roche-sur-Yon

20 June 2015
16:10

Mozambique	6 – 3	England
Rodrigues 6', 25', 26'; Araújo 8', 15'; Saraiva 37'		A. Mount 9'; Waddingham 13', 40'

Vendéspace, La Roche-sur-Yon

21 June 2015
13:30

England	1 – 8	Argentina
Stewart 18'		Nicolia 10', 30'; Páez 11', 15'; R. García 15'; Ordoñez 19', 19', 23'

Vendéspace, La Roche-sur-Yon

21 June 2015
16:00

Switzerland	1 – 3	Mozambique
G. Jimenez 6'		Rodrigues 6'; Araújo 21', 40'

Vendéspace, La Roche-sur-Yon

23 June 2015
08:30

Switzerland	7 – 1	England
G. Jimenez 1', 40'; Imhof 10'; Kissling 10', 30'; Schaffer 24'; Vanina 32'		Waddingham 19'

Vendéspace, La Roche-sur-Yon

23 June 2015
13:30

Argentina	5 – 4	Mozambique
Nicolia 7', 8', 8'; Ordoñez 12', 29'		Pinto 3'; Saraiva 3'; Rodrigues 20'; Araújo 24'

Vendéspace, La Roche-sur-Yon

=== Group C ===
Team	Pld	W	L	GF	GA	GD	Pts
Portugal	3	3	0	26	4	+22	9
Germany	3	2	1	15	9	+6	6
Austria	3	1	2	5	22	−17	3
Brazil	3	0	3	6	17	−11	0

21 June 2015
08:30

Brazil	2 – 3	Austria
Matos 4'; Fernandes 13'		Huber 12', 23', 30'

Vendéspace, La Roche-sur-Yon

21 June 2015
19:30

Portugal	5 – 2	Germany
Rodrigues 1', 36'; Alves 1'; Rafa 23'; Rafael 30'		Peinke 11'; Hages 20'

Vendéspace, La Roche-sur-Yon

22 June 2015
19:30

Austria	0 – 13	Portugal
		Alves 1', 5'; Nunes 4', 29'; Silva 7', 26'; Rodrigues 12', 16', 20', 21'; Neves 14'; Pinto 31'; Rafa 39'

Vendéspace, La Roche-sur-Yon

22 June 2015
21:15

Germany	6 – 2	Brazil
Milewski 8', 21', 32'; Karschau 18'; Pereira 30'; Peinke 34'		Dias 10'; Fernandes 19'

Vendéspace, La Roche-sur-Yon

23 June 2015
11:50

Germany	7 – 2	Austria
Pereira 3'; Hages 10'; Karschau 10', 28'; Milewski 21', 24', 26'		Parfant 18'; Brunner 22'

Vendéspace, La Roche-sur-Yon

23 June 2015
19:30

Portugal	8 – 2	Brazil
Rafael 8'; Rodrigues 17'; Rafa 18', 31', 33'; Silva 34', 39'; Alves 38'		Fernandes 19'; Garcia 33'

Vendéspace, La Roche-sur-Yon

=== Group D ===
Team	Pld	W	L	GF	GA	GD	Pts
Italy	3	3	0	24	7	+17	9
Chile	3	2	1	22	8	+14	6
Colombia	3	1	2	8	8	0	3
South Africa	3	0	3	3	34	−31	0

21 June 2015
10:10

Chile	14 – 1	South Africa
Fernández 7', 32'; Carmona 9', 34', 34'; Castro 10'; Andrade 18', 23'; A. Quintanilla 22'; Díaz 26', 29'; Osorio 36', 38'; Figa 39'		C. Araújo 4'

Vendéspace, La Roche-sur-Yon

21 June 2015
11:50

Italy	3 – 2	Colombia
Motaran 25', 27'; Ambrosio 34'		Toro 2'; Castaño 40'

Vendéspace, La Roche-sur-Yon

22 June 2015
16:00

Colombia	2 – 4	Chile
Toro 5'; Hoyos 32'		Fernández 12'; Figa 27'; Díaz 35'; Castro 39'

Vendéspace, La Roche-sur-Yon

22 June 2015
17:40

South Africa	1 – 16	Italy
L. Araújo 29'		Tataranni 6', 7', 8', 27', 32'; Amato 10', 19'; Verona 16', 30', 34'; Gnata 18'; Ambrosio 19'; Cocco 21'; Pagnini 25', 35'; Illuzzi 38'

Vendéspace, La Roche-sur-Yon

23 June 2015
10:10

South Africa	1 – 4	Colombia
R. Guerra 10'		Ramírez 20', 21'; Giraldo 35'; Toro 40'

Vendéspace, La Roche-sur-Yon

23 June 2015
17:40

Chile	4 – 5	Italy
Castro 27'; Osorio 28'; Carmona 36'; Fernández 37'		Tataranni 4', 8', 15'; Ambrosio 25', 38'

Vendéspace, La Roche-sur-Yon

== Knockout phase ==
=== Ninth to sixteenth place playoff ===
==== Bracket ====
Quarter-finals
25 June – La Roche-sur-Yon
Angola	12
England	0
25 June – La Roche-sur-Yon
Colombia	1
Brazil	3
25 June – La Roche-sur-Yon
Switzerland	6
Netherlands	5
25 June – La Roche-sur-Yon
Austria	5
South Africa	1

Semi-finals
26 June – La Roche-sur-Yon
Angola	3
Brazil	2
26 June – La Roche-sur-Yon
Switzerland	5
Austria	2

Ninth place
27 June – La Roche-sur-Yon
Angola	4
Switzerland	3
Eleventh place
27 June – La Roche-sur-Yon
Brazil	5
Austria	3

==== Thirteenth to sixteenth place bracket ====
Semi-finals
26 June – La Roche-sur-Yon
England	1
Colombia	7
26 June – La Roche-sur-Yon
Netherlands	9
South Africa	3

Thirteenth place
27 June – La Roche-sur-Yon
Colombia	4
Netherlands	2
Fifteenth place
27 June – La Roche-sur-Yon
England	6
South Africa	5

==== Ninth to sixteenth place playoff ====
25 June 2015
08:30

Angola	12 – 0	England
Centeno 11', 11', 25', 26'; Fernandes 15', 39'; Big 21', 26'; Payero 24', 25'; Johe 37', 38'

Vendéspace, La Roche-sur-Yon
25 June 2015
10:10

Switzerland	6 – 5	Netherlands
G. Jimenez 1', 4', 8'; Kissling 6', 31'; Vanina 40'		C. Vives 14', 17', 40'; E. Vives 30'; Janssens 40'

Vendéspace, La Roche-sur-Yon
25 June 2015
11:50

Austria	5 – 1	South Africa
Parfant 8', 14'; Huber 12', 23'; Zehrer 40'		L. Araújo 25'

Vendéspace, La Roche-sur-Yon
25 June 2015
13:30

Colombia	1 – 3	Brazil
Ramírez 1'		Raposo 17'; Dias 22', 23'

Vendéspace, La Roche-sur-Yon

==== Thirteenth to sixteenth place playoff ====
26 June 2015
08:30

England	1 – 7	Colombia
Johnson 40'		Castaño 6', 13', 36'; Ramírez 14'; Giraldo 35'; López 38'; Castillo 40'

Vendéspace, La Roche-sur-Yon
26 June 2015
10:10

Netherlands	9 – 3	South Africa
C. Vives 2', 4', 8'; Janssens 22', 24', 31'; D. Holtzer 29', 34'; E. Vives 35'		R. Guerra 7'; C. Araújo 13'; Oliveira 21'

Vendéspace, La Roche-sur-Yon

==== Ninth to twelfth place playoff ====
26 June 2015
11:50

Angola	3 – 2	Brazil
Payero 4', 11'; Centeno 5'		Raposo 16'; Fernandes 27'

Vendéspace, La Roche-sur-Yon
26 June 2015
13:30

Switzerland	5 – 2	Austria
G. Jimenez 5', 9'; Imhof 5'; Münger 7'; Kissling 29'		Huber 28'; Parfant 39'

Vendéspace, La Roche-sur-Yon

==== Fifteenth place match ====
27 June 2015
08:30

England	6 – 5	South Africa
Waddingham 3', 4', 12'; Johnson 5', 28'; Smith 16'		C. Araújo 21', 27', 31', 33', 39'

Vendéspace, La Roche-sur-Yon

==== Thirteenth place match ====
27 June 2015
10:10

Colombia	4 – 2	Netherlands
Ramírez 4', 30', 37'; Hoyos 16'		E. Vives 6'; C. Vives 8'

Vendéspace, La Roche-sur-Yon

==== Eleventh place match ====
27 June 2015
11:50

Brazil	5 – 3	Austria
Fernandes 1', 6'; Matos 15', 18', 21'		Huber 1', 15'; Stockinger 6'

Vendéspace, La Roche-sur-Yon

==== Ninth place match ====
27 June 2015
13:30

Angola	4 – 3	Switzerland
Payero 2', 10', 37'; Fernandes 29'		Münger 4'; G. Jimenez 23'; Kissling 34'

Vendéspace, La Roche-sur-Yon

=== Championship playoff ===
==== Bracket ====
Quarter-finals
25 June – La Roche-sur-Yon
Spain	9
Mozambique	0
25 June – La Roche-sur-Yon
Italy	6
Germany	7
25 June – La Roche-sur-Yon
Argentina	5
France	0
25 June – La Roche-sur-Yon
Portugal	6
Chile	0

Semi-finals
26 June – La Roche-sur-Yon
Spain	6
Germany	2
26 June – La Roche-sur-Yon
Argentina	5
Portugal	2

Final
27 June – La Roche-sur-Yon
Spain	1
Argentina	6
Third place
27 June – La Roche-sur-Yon
Germany	3
Portugal	7

==== Fifth to eighth place bracket ====
Semi-finals
26 June – La Roche-sur-Yon
Mozambique	2
Italy	5
26 June – La Roche-sur-Yon
France (a.e.t.)	3
Chile	2

Fifth place
27 June – La Roche-sur-Yon
Italy	6
France	3
Seventh place
27 June – La Roche-sur-Yon
Mozambique	8
Chile	5

==== Quarterfinals ====
25 June 2015
15:20

Spain	9 – 0	Mozambique
Gil 8', 31', 34', 39', 40'; J. Lamas 14', 35', 36'; Adroher 23'

Vendéspace, La Roche-sur-Yon
25 June 2015
17:00

Italy	6 – 7	Germany
Tataranni 17', 32', 39'; Verona 20'; Ambrosio 30'; Illuzzi 40'		Pereira 10', 33', 35'; Karschau 18', 27', 31'; Peinke 38'

Vendéspace, La Roche-sur-Yon
25 June 2015
19:30

Portugal	6 – 0	Chile
Alves 18', 21', 23', 25'; Rodrigues 24'; Rafa 35'

Vendéspace, La Roche-sur-Yon
25 June 2015
21:15

Argentina	5 – 0	France
Platero 5'; Nicolia 9', 12'; Ordoñez 34', 38'

Vendéspace, La Roche-sur-Yon

==== Fifth to eighth place playoff ====
26 June 2015
16:00

Mozambique	2 – 5	Italy
Saraiva 8'; Rodrigues 15'		Ambrosio 19'; Tataranni 28'; Pagnini 37'; Motaran 37'; Amato 38'

Vendéspace, La Roche-sur-Yon
26 June 2015
21:15

France	3 – 2 (a.e.t.)	Chile
Di Benedetto 22'; Weber 39'; Herman 50'		Carmona 14', 19'

Vendéspace, La Roche-sur-Yon

==== Semifinals ====
26 June 2015
17:40

Spain	6 – 2	Germany
Bargalló 3', 6', 13'; J. Lamas 10'; E. Lamas 30'; Gual 39'		Hages 2'; Pereira 8'

Vendéspace, La Roche-sur-Yon
26 June 2015
19:30

Argentina	5 – 2	Portugal
R. García 10', 38'; Ordoñez 28'; Nicolia 34', 40'		Nunes 25', 26'

Vendéspace, La Roche-sur-Yon

==== Seventh place match ====
27 June 2015
15:45

Mozambique	8 – 5	Chile
Pinto 4'; Araújo 7', 12', 36', 37'; Rodrigues 23', 33'; Saraiva 38'		Carmona 6'; A. Quintanilla 8', 29'; Fernández 36'; Andrade 39'

Vendéspace, La Roche-sur-Yon

==== Fifth place match ====
27 June 2015
17:30

Italy	6 – 3	France
Tataranni 1', 39'; Illuzzi 2', 27'; Ambrosio 7', 38'		Herman 15'; David 27', 40'

Vendéspace, La Roche-sur-Yon

==== Third place match ====
27 June 2015
19:20

Germany	3 – 7	Portugal
Karschau 24', 27'; Peinke 29'		Silva 5'; Rafa 12', 38'; Nunes 18'; Alves 19'; Rodrigues 37'; Neves 39'

Vendéspace, La Roche-sur-Yon

==== Final ====
27 June 2015
21:00

Spain	1 – 6	Argentina
Bargalló 5'		Ordoñez 9', 29', 37'; Páez 12', 15'; Nicolia 37'

Vendéspace, La Roche-sur-Yon

== Final ranking ==
Rank	Team	Relegation
1st place, gold medalist(s)	Argentina	
2nd place, silver medalist(s)	Spain	
3rd place, bronze medalist(s)	Portugal	
4	Germany	
5	Italy	
6	France	
7	Mozambique	
8	Chile	
9	Angola	
10	Switzerland	
11	Brazil	
12	Austria	
13	Colombia	
14	Netherlands	Relegation to B World Cup
15	England	Relegation to B World Cup
16	South Africa	Relegation to B World Cup
