= 2014 CERH European Roller Hockey U-17 Championship =

Tournament details
- Host country: France
- Dates: 24–30 August
- Teams: 10 (from 1 confederation)
- Venue(s): Gujan-Mestras

Final positions
- Champions: Italy (6th title)
- Runners-up: Spain
- Third place: Portugal
- Fourth place: France

Tournament statistics
- Matches played: 30
- Goals scored: 160 (5.33 per match)

The 2014 CERH European Roller Hockey U-17 Championship was the 33rd edition of the CERH European Roller Hockey Juvenile Championship. It was held in Gujan-Mestras, France from 24 to 30 August 2014.

== Group stage ==
=== Group A ===
Team	Pts	Pld	W	D	L	GF	GA	GD
Italy	10	4	3	1	0	19	2	+17
Portugal	9	4	3	0	1	20	4	+16
Andorra	7	4	2	1	1	19	7	+12
Switzerland	3	4	1	0	3	6	17	–11
Austria	0	4	0	0	4	1	35	–34

24 August 2014

	Jogo
Portugal	9–0	Austria
Italy	5–1	Switzerland

25 August 2014

	Jogo
Italy	10–0	Austria
Andorra	0–5	Portugal

26 August 2014

	Jogo
Austria	1–3	Switzerland
Andorra	1–1	Italy

27 August 2014

	Jogo
Austria	0–13	Andorra
Portugal	6–1	Switzerland

28 August 2014

	Jogo
Switzerland	1-5	Andorra
Italy	3-0	Portugal

=== Group B ===
Team	Pts	Pld	W	D	L	GF	GA	GD
Spain	8	4	2	2	0	15	4	+11
France	7	4	2	1	1	13	5	+8
England	7	4	2	1	1	12	8	+4
Germany	6	4	2	0	2	10	6	+4
Israel	0	4	0	0	4	3	30	–27

24 August 2014

	Jogo
Spain	1–1	England
France	7–0	Israel

25 August 2014

	Jogo
Spain	10–0	Israel
Germany	1–0	France

26 August 2014

	Jogo
Israel	2–6	England
Germany	0–1	France

27 August 2014

	Jogo
Israel	1–7	Germany
France	3–1	England

28 August 2014

	Jogo
England	4-2	Germany
Spain	3-3	France

== Knockout stage ==
=== Championship ===
Semi-finals
29-Aug-14 18:45 (G24)
Spain	2
Portugal	0
29-Aug-14 20:00 (G25)
Italy	3
France	1

Final
30-Aug-14 20:00
Spain	0
Italy	1
Third place
30-Aug-14 18:45
Portugal	2
France	0

=== 5th - 8th playoff ===
Semi-finals
29-Aug-14 16:15 (G22)
Switzerland	3
England	2
29-Aug-14 17:30 (G23)
Andorra	2
Germany	1

5th place
30-Aug-14 17:30
Switzerland	5
Andorra	3
7th place
30-Aug-14 16:15
England	2
Germany	6

=== 9th–10th playoff ===
	Agg		G1	G2
Austria	6-3	Israel	2-1	4-2

== Final standing ==
Rank	Team
Gold medal	Italy
Silver medal	Spain
Bronze medal	Portugal
4	France
5	Switzerland
6	Andorra
7	Germany
8	England
9	Austria
10	Israel

2014 European Champions
ITALY
6th

== See also ==
- Roller Hockey
- CERH European Roller Hockey Juvenile Championship
