= 2013 CERH European Roller Hockey U-17 Championship =

Tournament details
- Host country: Spain
- Dates: 1–7 September
- Teams: 10 (from 5 confederations)
- Venue(s): Alcobendas

Final positions
- Champions: Portugal (12th title)
- Runners-up: France
- Third place: Spain
- Fourth place: Italy

Tournament statistics
- Matches played: 30
- Goals scored: 201 (6.7 per match)
- Top scorer(s): (Portugal) Gonçalo Nunes (16)

The 2013 CERH European Roller Hockey U-17 Championship was the 32nd edition of the CERH European Roller Hockey Juvenile Championship. It was held in Alcobendas, Spain from 1 to 7 September 2013.

== Group stage ==
=== Group A ===
Team	Pts	Pld	W	D	L	GF	GA	GD
Spain	12	4	4	0	0	25	2	23
Italy	9	4	3	0	1	20	3	17
Switzerland	6	4	2	0	2	11	14	-3
England	3	4	1	0	3	6	23	-17
Austria	0	4	0	0	4	5	25	-20

1 September 2013

	Jogo
Spain	5-0	Switzerland

2 September 2013

	Jogo
England	1-10	Italy
Austria	1-10	Spain

3 September 2013

	Jogo
Switzerland	7-3	Austria
Spain	8-0	England

4 September 2013

	Jogo
Italy	4-0	Austria
England	1-4	Switzerland
Italy	1-2	Spain

5 September 2013

	Jogo
Austria	1-4	England
Switzerland	0-5	Italy

=== Group B ===
Team	Pts	Pld	W	D	L	GF	GA	GD
Portugal	12	4	4	0	0	29	4	25
France	9	4	3	0	1	22	6	16
Andorra	6	4	2	0	2	13	8	5
Germany	3	4	1	0	3	9	14	-5
Israel	0	4	0	0	4	0	41	-41

1 September 2013

	Jogo
Portugal	12-0	Israel
France	3-2	Andorra

2 September 2013

	Jogo
Israel	0-14	France
Germany	1-9	Portugal

3 September 2013

	Jogo
Andorra	8-0	Israel
France	4-1	Germany

4 September 2013

	Jogo
Germany	0-1	Andorra
Portugal	3-1	France

5 September 2013

	Jogo
Israel	0-7	Germany
Andorra	2-5	Portugal

== Knockout stage ==
=== Championship ===
Semi-finals
6-Sep-13 18:45 (G24)
Portugal	8
Italy	1
6-Sep-13 20:00 (G25)
Spain	1
France	3

Final
7-Sep-13 20:00
Portugal	6
France	3
Third place
7-Sep-13 18:45
Italy	1
Spain	5

=== 5th - 8th playoff ===
Semi-finals
6-Sep-13 16:15 (G22)
England	2
Andorra	6
6-Sep-13 17:30 (G23)
Switzerland	1
Germany	2

5th place
7-Sep-13 17:30
Andorra	5
Germany	1
7th place
7-Sep-13 16:15
England	3
Switzerland	1

=== 9th–10th playoff ===
	Agg		G1	G2
Austria	7-5	Israel	5-0	2-5

== Final standing ==
Rank	Team
Gold medal	Portugal
Silver medal	France
Bronze medal	Spain
4	Italy
5	Andorra
6	Germany
7	England
8	Switzerland
9	Austria
10	Israel

2013 European Champions
PORTUGAL
12th

== See also ==
- Roller Hockey
- CERH European Roller Hockey Juvenile Championship
