= 2015 FIRS Roller Hockey World Cup U-20 =

2015 FIRS Roller Hockey World Cup U-20 and 2015 Vilanova
Tournament details
- Host country: Spain
- Dates: 19–26 September
- Teams: 16 (from 4 confederations)
- Venue(s): 1 (in Vilanova host cities)

Final positions
- Champions: Portugal (3rd title)
- Runners-up: Spain
- Third place: France
- Fourth place: Italy

Tournament statistics
- Matches played: 48
- Top scorer(s): (Italy) Giulio Cocco (25 goals)

The 2015 FIRS Roller Hockey World Cup U-20 was the 7th edition of the FIRS Roller Hockey World Cup U-20. It was held in September 2015 in Vilanova, Spain.

Portugal won its third title, the same as Spain.

== Group stage ==
=== Group A ===
Team	Pld	W	D	L	GF	GA	GD	Pts	POR	SUI	ANG	USA
Portugal	3	3	0	0	27	1	+26	9		5–1	5–0	17–0
Switzerland	3	2	0	1	33	7	+26	6				
Angola	3	1	0	2	26	9	+17	3		2–3 (Note: Golden goal)		24–1
United States	3	0	0	3	1	70	−69	0		0–29		

=== Group B ===
Team	Pld	W	D	L	GF	GA	GD	Pts	ESP	COL	GER	ENG
Spain	3	3	0	0	21	4	+17	9		9–2	6–1	6–1
Colombia	3	2	0	1	9	14	−5	6			3–2	4–3
Germany	3	1	0	2	6	11	−5	3				
England	3	0	0	3	6	13	−7	0			2–3	

=== Group C ===
Team	Pld	W	D	L	GF	GA	GD	Pts	ARG	CHI	EGY	ZAF
Argentina	3	3	0	0	33	1	+32	9		3–1	14–0	16–0
Chile	3	2	0	1	29	4	+25	6			12–0	16–1
Egypt	3	1	0	2	5	28	−23	3				
South Africa	3	0	0	3	3	36	−33	0			2–5	

=== Group D ===
Team	Pld	W	D	L	GF	GA	GD	Pts	ITA	FRA	AND	IND
Italy	3	3	0	0	50	5	+45	9			4–3	37–0
France	3	2	0	1	46	9	+37	6	2–9		5–0	39–0
Andorra	3	1	0	2	13	10	+3	3				
India	3	0	0	3	1	86	−85	0			1–10	

== Knockout stage ==
=== Championship ===
Quarterfinals
G	Portugal	3
29	Colombia	0
G	Italy	4
30	Chile	2
G	Argentina	0
31	France	1
G	Spain	8
32	Switzerland	0

Semifinals
G	Portugal	2
39	Italy	1
G	France	4
40	Spain	5

Finals
F1	Portugal	1
F2	Spain	1
3rd place
C1	Italy	2
C2	France	2

==== Games ====
Quarter-Final

=== 5th-8th place ===
Qualifiers
G	Colombia	0
37	Chile	6
G	Argentina	6
38	Switzerland	1

5th Place Game
G	Chile	1
46	Argentina	2
7th Place Game
G	Colombia	4
45	Switzerland	3

=== 9th-16th place ===
Quarterfinals
G	Egypt	1
25	India	8
G	Germany	16
28	United States	0
G	Andorra	13
26	South Africa	1
G	Angola	2
27	England	3

Semifinals
G	India	7
35	Germany	12
G	Andorra	7
36	England	4

9th place
F1	Germany	2
F2	Andorra	4
11th place
C1	India	3
C2	England	16

=== 13th-16th place ===
Qualifiers
G	Egypt	3
33	United States	2
G	South Africa	1
34	Angola	6

13th Place Game
G	Egypt	0
42	Angola	18
15th Place Game
G	United States	6
41	South Africa	5

== Final standing ==
Rank	Team
1st place, gold medalist(s)	Portugal
2nd place, silver medalist(s)	Spain
3rd place, bronze medalist(s)	France
4	Italy
5	Argentina
6	Chile
7	Colombia
8	Switzerland
9	Andorra
10	Germany
11	England
12	India
13	Angola
14	Egypt
15	United States
16	South Africa

2015 FIRS Roller Hockey World Cup U-20 champions
PORTUGAL
Third title
