= 2011 FIRS Roller Hockey World Cup U-20 =

Tournament details
- Host country: Portugal
- Dates: 10–17 September
- Teams: 15 (from 4 confederations)
- Venue(s): Barcelos (in 1 host city)

Final positions
- Champions: Spain
- Runners-up: Portugal
- Third place: Italy
- Fourth place: Argentina

The 2011 FIRS Roller Hockey World Cup U-20 was the 5th edition of the FIRS Roller Hockey World Cup U-20. It was held in September 2011 in Barcelos.

== Venues ==
Barcelos was the host city of the tournament, and the rink was the Pavilhão Municipal de Barcelos.

== Squads ==
Each team's squad for the 2011 World Cup consisted of 10 players.

== Matches ==
All times are Portugal Time (UTC0).

=== Group stage ===
==== Group A ====
Team	Pld	W	D	L	GF	GA	GD	Pts
Spain	2	2	0	0	11	3	+8	6
Switzerland	2	1	0	1	3	5	−2	3
Colombia	2	0	0	2	5	11	−6	0

11 September 2011
21:00

Spain	8–3	Colombia
	Report

12 September 2011
18:00

Switzerland	0–3	Spain
	Report

13 September 2011
16:30

Colombia	2–3	Switzerland
	Report

==== Group B ====
Team	Pld	W	D	L	GF	GA	GD	Pts
Portugal	3	3	0	0	51	7	+44	9
France	3	2	0	1	26	11	+15	6
Angola	3	1	0	2	14	12	+2	3
Austria	3	0	0	3	4	65	−61	0

10 September 2011
21:00

Portugal	6–3	Angola
	Report

11 September 2011
11:30

Austria	1–19	France
	Report

12 September 2011
19:30

Austria	2–8	Angola
	Report

12 September 2011
21:00

France	3–7	Portugal
	Report

13 September 2011
19:30

Angola	3–4	France
	Report

13 September 2011
21:00

Portugal	38–1	Austria
	Report

==== Group C ====
Team	Pld	W	D	L	GF	GA	GD	Pts
Argentina	3	3	0	0	39	0	+39	9
Chile	3	2	0	1	18	4	+14	6
England	3	1	0	2	23	13	+10	3
India	3	0	0	3	1	64	−63	0

11 September 2011
13:00

Chile	3–1	England
	Report

11 September 2011
16:30

India	0–27	Argentina
	Report

12 September 2011
10:00

India	1–22	England
	Report

12 September 2011
11:30

Argentina	3–0	Chile
	Report

13 September 2011
13:00

Chile	15–0	India
	Report

13 September 2011
18:00

England	0–9	Argentina
	Report

==== Group D ====
Team	Pld	W	D	L	GF	GA	GD	Pts
Italy	3	3	0	0	55	2	+53	9
Germany	3	2	0	1	65	9	+56	6
South Africa	3	1	0	2	12	59	−47	3
(United States) USA	3	0	0	3	4	66	−62	0

11 September 2011
18:00

Italy	26–0	(United States) USA
	Report

11 September 2011
19:30

South Africa	0–35	Germany
	Report

12 September 2011
13:00

South Africa	12–3	(United States) USA
	Report

12 September 2011
16:30

Germany	2–8	Italy
	Report

13 September 2011
10:00

Italy	21–0	South Africa
	Report

13 September 2011
11:30

(United States) USA	1–28	Germany
	Report

== Knockout stage ==
=== Championship ===
Quarterfinals
Argentina	8
Germany	3
Switzerland	0
Portugal	8
Italy	4
Chile	1
Spain	6
France	1

Semifinals
Argentina	7
Portugal	9
Italy	2
Spain	5

Finals
Portugal	2
Spain	7
3rd Place
Argentina	2 et
Italy	3 et

=== Quarterfinals ===
15 September 2011
16:30

Argentina	2–1	Germany
	Report

15 September 2011
18:00

Italy	4–1	Chile
	Report

15 September 2011
19:30

Switzerland	0–8	Portugal
	Report

15 September 2011
21:00

Spain	6–1	France
	Report

=== Semifinals ===
16 September 2011
19:30

Argentina	7–9	Portugal
	Report

16 September 2011
21:00

Italy	2–5	Spain
	Report

=== Final ===
17 September 2011
19:30

Portugal	2–7	Spain
	Report

=== 5th-8th place ===
Qualifiers
France	5
Chile	4
Germany	5
Switzerland	3

5th Place Game
France	2 (2gp)
Germany	2 (3gp)
7th Place Game
Chile	5
Switzerland	4

=== 9th-12th place ===
Qualifier 1
Colombia	5
Austria	2
South Africa	14
India	4
Angola
England	19
United States	0

Qualifier 2
Colombia	15
South Africa	1
Angola	5
England	2

9th Place
Colombia	2
Angola	5
11th Place
South Africa	2
England	7

=== 13th-15th Place ===
Team	Pld	W	D	L	GF	GA	GD	Pts	AUT	USA	IND
Austria	2	2	0	0	26	4	+22	6		14–3	12–1
United States	2	1	0	1	13	16	−3	3	10–2		
India	2	0	0	2	3	22	−19	0			

== Final standing ==
Rank	Team
1st place, gold medalist(s)	Spain
2nd place, silver medalist(s)	Portugal
3rd place, bronze medalist(s)	Italy
4	Argentina
5	Germany
6	France
7	Chile
8	Switzerland
9	Angola
10	Colombia
11	England
12	South Africa
13	Austria
14	United States
15	India

2011 FIRS Roller Hockey World Cup U-20
SPAIN
3rd title
