= 2016 CERH European Roller Hockey U-17 Championship =

Tournament details
- Host country: Spain
- Dates: 4–10 September
- Teams: 10 (from 1 confederation)
- Venue: Mieres

Tournament statistics
- Matches played: 30

The 2016 CERH European Roller Hockey U-17 Championship was the 35th edition of the CERH European Roller Hockey Juvenile Championship. It was held in Mieres, Spain from 4 to 10 September 2016.

== Group stage ==
=== Group A ===
Team	Pts	Pld	W	D	L	GF	GA	GD
Portugal	12	4	4	0	0	38	5	+33
Germany	9	4	3	0	1	20	12	+8
Italy	6	4	2	0	2	20	10	+10
Andorra	1	4	0	1	3	6	30	–24
Austria	1	4	0	1	3	3	30	–27

4 September 2016

	Jogo
Italy	7–2	Andorra
Germany	8–1	Austria

5 September 2016

	Jogo
Italy	3–5	Germany
Portugal	16–1	Andorra

6 September 2016

	Jogo
Austria	0–8	Italy
Portugal	6–1	Germany

7 September 2016

	Jogo
Andorra	2–6	Germany
Austria	1–13	Portugal

8 September 2016

	Jogo
Andorra	1-1	Austria
Italy	2-3	Portugal

=== Group B ===
Team	Pts	Pld	W	D	L	GF	GA	GD
Spain	12	4	4	0	0	45	5	+40
France	9	4	3	0	1	27	7	+20
Switzerland	6	4	2	0	2	20	22	–2
England	3	4	1	0	3	12	36	–24
Israel	0	4	0	0	4	7	41	–34

4 September 2016

	Jogo
Switzerland	10–3	Israel
Spain	15–1	England

5 September 2016

	Jogo
France	10–0	Israel
Spain	11–1	Switzerland

6 September 2016

	Jogo
England	2–9	Switzerland
France	2–4	Spain

7 September 2016

	Jogo
England	3–9	France
Israel	1–15	Spain

8 September 2016

	Jogo
Israel	3-6	England
Switzerland	0-6	France

== Knockout stage ==
=== Championship ===
Semi-finals
9-Sep-16 18:00
Spain	6
Germany	1
9-Sep-16 20:00
Portugal	5
France	1

Final
10-Sep-16 20:00
Spain	4 (5 g.g.)
Portugal	4 (4)
Third place
10-Sep-16 18:00
Germany	1
France	4

=== 5th - 8th playoff ===
Semi-finals
9-Sep-16 14:00
Andorra	3
Switzerland	2
9-Sep-16 16:00
Italy	3
England	2

5th place
10-Sep-16 14:00
Andorra	1
Italy	7
7th place
10-Sep-16 16:00
Switzerland	1 g.g.
England	0

=== 9th–10th playoff ===
	Agg		G1	G2
Austria	7-8 g.g.	Israel	3–1	4-7 g.g.

== Final standing ==
Rank	Team
Gold medal	Spain
Silver medal	Portugal
Bronze medal	France
4	Germany
5	Italy
6	Andorra
7	Switzerland
8	England
9	Israel
10	Austria

2016 European Champions
SPAIN
17th

== See also ==
- Roller Hockey
- CERH European Roller Hockey Juvenile Championship
