= 2005 Rink Hockey World Championship =

Rink Hockey World Championship
- 2005

Tournament information
- Host(s): San Jose, United States
- Teams: 16

Final positions
- Champions: Spain (12th title)

The 2005 Rink Hockey World Championship was the 37th edition of the Rink Hockey World Championship, held between 6 and 13 August 2005, in San Jose, United States. It was disputed by 16 countries.

== Format ==
The competition was disputed by 16 countries, divided in four groups of 4 teams each one.

Every game lasted 40 minutes, divided in 2 parts of 20 minutes.

== Matches ==
=== Group stage ===
==== Group A ====
| Team | Pld | W | D | L | GF | GA | GD | Pts |
|---|---|---|---|---|---|---|---|---|
| Portugal | 3 | 3 | 0 | 0 | 32 | 7 | +25 | 9 |
| Angola | 3 | 1 | 1 | 1 | 23 | 9 | +14 | 4 |
| Chile | 3 | 1 | 1 | 1 | 17 | 10 | +7 | 4 |
| Macau | 3 | 0 | 0 | 3 | 6 | 52 | −46 | 0 |

6 August 2005
15:00

| Angola | 1 – 5 | Portugal |

7 August 2005
15:00

| Chile | 11 – 2 | Macau |

8 August 2005
10:30

| Macau | 3 – 21 | Angola |

8 August 2005
16:30

| Chile | 5 – 7 | Portugal |

9 August 2005
10:30

| Chile | 1 – 1 | Angola |

9 August 2005
16:30

| Macau | 1 – 20 | Portugal |

==== Group B ====
| Team | Pld | W | D | L | GF | GA | GD | Pts |
|---|---|---|---|---|---|---|---|---|
| Italy | 3 | 3 | 0 | 0 | 22 | 5 | +17 | 9 |
| Switzerland | 3 | 2 | 0 | 1 | 12 | 5 | +7 | 6 |
| Andorra | 3 | 1 | 0 | 2 | 4 | 9 | −5 | 3 |
| Mozambique | 3 | 0 | 0 | 3 | 4 | 23 | −19 | 0 |

7 August 2005
12:00

| Switzerland | 7 – 0 | Mozambique |

7 August 2005
16:30

| Andorra | 1 – 4 | Italy |

8 August 2005
12:00

| Mozambique | 2 – 3 | Andorra |

8 August 2005
19:30

| Switzerland | 2 – 5 | Italy |

9 August 2005
12:00

| Switzerland | 3 – 0 | Andorra |

9 August 2005
19:30

| Mozambique | 2 – 13 | Italy |

==== Group C ====
| Team | Pld | W | D | L | GF | GA | GD | Pts |
|---|---|---|---|---|---|---|---|---|
| Spain | 3 | 3 | 0 | 0 | 17 | 2 | +15 | 9 |
| France | 3 | 1 | 1 | 1 | 4 | 8 | −4 | 4 |
| England | 3 | 1 | 0 | 2 | 6 | 6 | 0 | 3 |
| Netherlands | 3 | 0 | 1 | 2 | 3 | 14 | −11 | 1 |

7 August 2005
13:30

| Netherlands | 0 – 4 | England |

7 August 2005
18:00

| France | 0 – 5 | Spain |

8 August 2005
13:30

| England | 1 – 2 | France |

8 August 2005
18:00

| Netherlands | 1 – 8 | Spain |

9 August 2005
13:30

| Netherlands | 2 – 2 | France |

9 August 2005
18:00

| England | 1 – 4 | Spain |

==== Group D ====
| Team | Pld | W | D | L | GF | GA | GD | Pts |
|---|---|---|---|---|---|---|---|---|
| Argentina | 3 | 3 | 0 | 0 | 27 | 3 | +24 | 9 |
| Brazil | 3 | 1 | 1 | 1 | 9 | 9 | 0 | 4 |
| Germany | 3 | 1 | 1 | 1 | 6 | 9 | −3 | 4 |
| United States | 3 | 0 | 0 | 3 | 1 | 22 | −21 | 0 |

7 August 2005
19:30

| Germany | 4 – 0 | United States |

7 August 2005
21:00

| Brazil | 3 – 6 | Argentina |

8 August 2005
15:00

| Germany | 0 – 7 | Argentina |

8 August 2005
21:00

| United States | 1 – 4 | Brazil |

9 August 2005
15:00

| Germany | 2 – 2 | Brazil |

9 August 2005
21:00

| United States | 0 – 14 | Argentina |

=== Championship Knockout stage ===
Quarter-finals
11 August
Portugal | 3
Switzerland | 2
11 August
Spain | 13
Brazil | 1
11 August
Angola | 1
Italy | 2
11 August
Argentina | 6
France | 0

Semi-finals
12 August
Portugal | 1
Spain | 4
12 August
Italy | 1
Argentina | 7

Final
13 August
Spain | 2
Argentina | 1
Third place
13 August
Portugal | 4
Italy | 3

=== 5th place bracket ===
Semi-finals
12 August
Switzerland | 5
Brazil | 1
12 August
Angola | 2
France | 5

Fifth place
13 August
Switzerland | 5
France | 1
Seventh place
13 August
Brazil | 2
Angola | 6

=== 9th to 16th place knockout stage ===
Quarter-finals
11 August
Chile | 4
Mozambique | 3
11 August
England | 3
United States | 5
11 August
Andorra | 9
Macau | 3
11 August
Germany | 8
Netherlands | 0

Ninth place
12 August
Chile | 2
United States | 0
12 August
Andorra | 1
Germany | 2

Final
13 August
Chile | 3
Germany | 5
Eleventh place
13 August
United States | 6
Andorra | 1

=== 13th place bracket ===
Semi-finals
12 August
Mozambique | 2
England | 4
12 August
Macau | 6
Netherlands | 7

Thirteenth place
13 August
England | 3
Netherlands | 1
Fifteenth place
13 August
Mozambique | 9
Macau | 4

== Final standings ==
| Place | Team |
|---|---|
| 1 | Spain |
| 2 | Argentina |
| 3 | Portugal |
| 4 | Italy |
| 5 | Switzerland |
| 6 | France |
| 7 | Angola |
| 8 | Brazil |
| 9 | Germany |
| 10 | Chile |
| 11 | United States |
| 12 | Andorra |
| 13 | England |
| 14 | Netherlands |
| 15 | Mozambique |
| 16 | Macau |

2005 Rink Hockey World Championship
SPAIN
12th title
