= Iran women's national inline hockey team =

Iran national inline hockey team
- League: Islamic Republic of Iran Skating Federation
- Based in: Tehran
- Stadium: Enghelab Sports Complex
- Head coach: (France) Marina Fagoaga Jalinier
- Website: IRSF; Official Team Instagram

Iran Women's national inline hockey team represents Iran at international inline hockey competitions for women.

== Current staff ==
- Head Coach: (France) Marina Fagoaga Jalinier

== Team roster ==
The following 16 players have been invited to take part in Roller Hockey Asia Cup which will be held in China in October 2016.

  1. ? – Sousan Ghasemi (Goalie)
  2. ? – Behnaz Sarbazi (Goalie)
  3. 1 – Samaneh Nazeri (Goalie)
  4. ? – Mahsa Shadan (Defence)
  5. ? – Sadaf Mansouri (Defence)
  6. 13 – Faezeh Modabber (Defence) [Vice Captain]
  7. 26 – Hoda Ahmadbegi (Defence) [Vice Captain]
  8. 66 – Helia Sohani (Defence) [Captain]
  9. 67 – Sara Satarian (Defence)
  10. 88 – Maryamalsadat Seyedmahmoud (Defence)
  11. 7 – Maral Rasekhi (Forward)
  12. 12 – Marzieh Seyedghandi (Forward)
  13. 17 – Bita Mohsenizadehtehrani (Forward)
  14. 18 – Azamossadat Sanaei (Forward)
  15. 33 – Azin Gharouni (Forward)
  16. 99 – Samaneh Heydari (Forward)

== Tournaments ==
=== Asian Roller Skating Championship – Inline Hockey International Cup ===
Year/Host	Rank
(China) 2010 Dalian	?
(China) 2012 Hefei	?
(China) 2014 Haining	Third place
(China) 2016 Lishui	Third place

=== FIRS World Championship ===
Year/Host	Rank	Pld	W	T	L
(Italy) 2016 Asiago, Roana	?	4	0	0	4
Total (1/?)	-	4	0	0	4

=== Open Championship ===
Year/Host	Rank
2009 Hong Kong	?
