= 2015 CERH European Roller Hockey U-17 Championship =

Tournament details
- Host country: Portugal
- Dates: 6–12 September
- Teams: 9 (from 1 confederation)
- Venue(s): Luso (Mealhada)

Final positions
- Champions: Portugal (13th title)
- Runners-up: Spain
- Third place: France
- Fourth place: Italy

Tournament statistics
- Matches played: 36
- Goals scored: 255 (7.08 per match)
- Top scorer(s): (Italy) Francesco Compagno

The 2015 CERH European Roller Hockey U-17 Championship was the 34th edition of the CERH European Roller Hockey Juvenile Championship. It was held in Luso (Mealhada), Portugal from 6 to 12 September 2015. Portugal won its 13th title.

== Standings ==
Pos	Team	Pts	Pld	W	D	L	GF	GA	GD
1	Portugal	22	8	7	1	0	49	10	+39
2	Spain	19	8	6	1	1	39	8	+31
3	France	18	8	6	0	2	24	10	+14
4	Italy	18	8	6	0	2	47	13	+34
5	Germany	10	8	3	1	4	25	20	+5
6	Switzerland	10	8	3	1	4	29	30	-1
7	England	6	8	2	0	6	20	37	-17
8	Austria	3	8	1	0	7	18	63	-45
9	Andorra	0	8	0	0	8	4	64	-60

== Results ==
Teams	Fra	Eng	Ita	And	Spa	Swi	Aut	Por	Ger
France		1-0	3-1	8-0	0-3				
England			3-5	5-0	0-4				2-4
Italy					5-1	7-2	12-1		4-0
Andorra			0-13		0-12		2-5		1-6
Spain						6-0	9-1	1-1	3-1
Switzerland	1-2	6-5		8-1				2-6	
Austria	1-4	3-5				2-9		3-12	
Portugal	3-2	14-0	3-0	7-0					
Germany	1-4					1-1	10-2	2-3	

2015 European Champions
PORTUGAL
13th

== See also ==
- Roller Hockey
- CERH European Roller Hockey Juvenile Championship
