= 2014 FIRS Men's B-Roller Hockey World Cup =

2014 FIRS B-World Cup
Tournament details
- Host country: Uruguay
- Dates: 15 – 22 November
- Teams: (from 4 confederations)
- Venue: (in Canelones host cities)

Final positions
- Champions: Austria (1st title)
- Runners-up: England
- Third place: Netherlands
- Fourth place: United States

Tournament statistics
- Matches played: 19
- Goals scored: 128 (6.74 per match)
- Top scorer: (United States) Josh Englund

The 2014 FIRS B-World Cup was the 16th and last edition of the Roller Hockey B World Championship. It was an official competition organized by CIRH. The competition was host in Canelones, Uruguay from 15 to 22 November.

== Venues ==
Canelones was the host city of the tournament, and the Rink will be enclosed the Sergio Matto stadium. All times are Uruguay Time (UTC-3).

== Group stage ==
=== Group A ===
Team	Pld	W	D	L	GF	GA	GD	Pts	ENG	USA	NED
England	2	2	0	0	10	2	+8	6		5–1	5–1
United States	2	1	0	1	5	7	−2	3			4–2
Netherlands	1	0	0	1	3	9	−6	0			

=== Group B ===
Team	Pld	W	D	L	GF	GA	GD	Pts	AUT	URU	MAC	EGY
Austria	3	3	0	0	13	7	+6	9		2–2 (2–1p)	5–4 (Note: After extra time)	6–1
Uruguay	3	2	0	1	8	4	+4	6			4–1	2–1
Macau	3	1	0	2	11	11	0	3				6–2
Egypt	3	0	0	3	4	14	−10	0				

== Knockout stage ==
=== Championship ===
Quarter-finals
20-Nov 18h00 (10)
England	8
Egypt	1
20-Nov 21h00 (12)
Netherlands	2 (2)
Uruguay	2 (0)
20-Nov 19h30 (11)
United States	5 (*)
Macau	4
Austria
BYE

Semi-finals
21-Nov 19h30 (15)
England	5
Netherlands	1
21-Nov 21h00 (16)
United States	4
Austria	5

Final
22-Nov 21h00 (19)
England	0
Austria	1
Third place
22-Nov 19h30 (18)
Netherlands	11
United States	3

(*) = After extra time

=== 5th to 7th Place Group ===
Team	Pld	W	D	L	GF	GA	GD	Pts	URU	MAC	EGY
Uruguay	2	2	0	0	7	2	+5	6		4–0	3–2
Macau	2	1	0	1	6	9	−3	3			6–5
Egypt	2	0	0	2	7	9	−2	0			

== Final ranking ==
Pos.	Country	
1.	Austria	Qualified to WC 2015
2.	England	Qualified to WC 2015
3.	Netherlands	Qualified to WC 2015
4.	United States	
5.	Uruguay	
6.	Macau	
7.	Egypt	
