= 2012 Asian Roller Hockey Cup =

Asia Cup 2012
2012 Asia Roller Hockey Championship

Tournament details
- Host country: China
- Dates: 27 October – 1 November
- Teams: 4
- Venue(s): 1 (in 1 host city)

The 2012 Asia Cup, was held in Hefei, China, between 27 October and 1 November 2012. It was the 15th Edition of this competition. The tournament was organized by the Confederation of Asia Roller Sports (CARS) and was part of the Roller Hockey Asia Cup.

== Men's Championship ==
Participating Men's National teams included Macau, Taiwan, India and Australia.

== Women's Championship ==
Participating Women's National teams included Macau, Taiwan and India.
