= 2010 Asian Roller Hockey Championship =

Asia Cup 2012
2010 Asian Roller Hockey Championship

Tournament details
- Host country: China
- Dates: 9 January – 15 January
- Teams: 4
- Venue: 1 (in 1 host city)

Final positions
- Champions: Macau (16th title)
- Runners-up: Japan
- Third place: India
- Fourth place: Taiwan

Tournament statistics
- Matches played: 6
- Goals scored: 50 (8.33 per match)

The 13th Asian Roller Hockey Championship, was held in Dalian, China, between 9 and 15 January 2010. The place of the matches was the Dalian Nationalities University. This Tournament is organized by the Confederation of Asia Roller Sports (CARS) and is the Rink Hockey Asian Championship.

== Men Championship ==
The Men's National teams participating were Macau, Japan, Taiwan and India.

Macau's Team was composed by the following players: Keepers: Leong Chak In and Paulo Gibelino. Field Players: Nuno Antunes, Hélder Ricardo, Augusto Ramos, Ricardo Atraca, Alexandre Torrão, Dinísio da Luz, Alfredo Almeida and Alberto Lisboa Trainer: Alberto Lisboa

Results

12-01-2010 Macau 6-2 Taiwan
Macau Goals by: Nuno Antunes (3), Alberto Lisboa, Augusto Fernandes e Ricardo Atraca
12-01-2010 Japan 4-3 India
13-01-2010 Macau 12-7 India
Macau Goals by: Hélder Ricardo (4), Alberto Lisboa (3), Augusto Fernandes (3) e Nuno Antunes (2)
13-01-2010 Japan 4-1 Taiwan
14-01-2010 India 5-2 Taiwan
14-01-2010 Macau 2-2 Japan
Macau Goals by: Hélder Ricardo e Ricardo Atraca

Winner	2nd place	3rd place	4th place
Macau	Japan	India	Taiwan

== Ladies Championship ==
The Women's National teams participating are Macau, Japan, Taiwan and India.

Macau's Team was composed by the following players: Keepers: Michelle Ritchie and Palmira Pena. Field Players: Sara Barrias, Dulce Atraca, Shelley Calangi, Cíntia Leite, A Weng and Kok Ka Man. Trainer: Alberto Lisboa.

Results

11-01-2010 Taiwan - India
11-01-2010 Japan 5-0 Macau
12-01-2010 India 12-1 Macau
Macau Goals by: Dulce Atraca Lisboa
12-01-2010 Japan - Taiwan
13-01-2010 India - Japan
13-01-2010 Macau 1-13 Taiwan
Macau Goals by: Sara Barrias

Winner	2nd place	3rd place	4th place
India	Japan	Taiwan	Macau
