= 2003 Rink Hockey World Championship =

Rink Hockey World Championship
Tournament information
- Host(s): Oliveira de Azeméis, Portugal
- Teams: 16
- Website: Archived 2011-07-01 at the Wayback Machine

Final positions
- Champions: Portugal (15th title)

Tournament statistics
- Matches played: 48
- Goals scored: 330 average 6,88 goals/match
- Top scorer(s): (Argentina) David Páez (13)

The 2003 Rink Hockey World Championship was the 36th edition of the Rink Hockey World Championship, held between 27 September and 4 October 2003, in Oliveira de Azeméis, Portugal.

== Format ==
The competition was disputed by 16 countries, divided in four groups of 4 teams each one.

Every game lasted 40 minutes, divided in 2 parts of 20 minutes.

== Matches ==
=== Group stage ===
==== Group A ====
Team	Pld	W	D	L	GF	GA	GD	Pts
Spain	3	3	0	0	14	3	+11	9
Switzerland	3	2	0	1	8	5	+3	6
Mozambique	3	1	0	2	6	6	0	3
England	3	0	0	3	2	16	−14	0

28 September 2003
11:30

Mozambique	1 – 2	Switzerland

28 September 2003
20:30

England	0 – 8	Spain

29 September 2003
11:30

Switzerland	5 – 1	England

29 September 2003
20:30

Spain	3 – 2	Mozambique

30 September 2003
10:00

Mozambique	3 – 1	England

30 September 2003
20:30

Switzerland	1 – 3	Spain

==== Group B ====
Team	Pld	W	D	L	GF	GA	GD	Pts
Argentina	3	3	0	0	39	3	+36	9
Angola	3	2	0	1	6	9	−3	6
Chile	3	1	0	2	6	21	−15	3
Colombia	3	0	0	3	3	21	−18	0

28 September 2003
10:00

Colombia	0 – 14	Argentina

28 September 2003
17:30

Angola	2 – 0	Chile

29 September 2003
16:00

Argentina	9 – 2	Angola

29 September 2003
8:30

Chile	5 – 3	Colombia

30 September 2003
8:30

Colombia	0 – 2	Angola

30 September 2003
16:00

Argentina	16 – 1	Chile

==== Group C ====
Team	Pld	W	D	L	GF	GA	GD	Pts
Italy	3	3	0	0	21	5	+16	9
Brazil	3	2	0	1	15	11	+4	6
United States	3	1	0	2	8	18	−10	3
Andorra	3	0	0	3	5	15	−10	0

28 September 2003
8:30

United States	5 – 1	Andorra

28 September 2003
16:00

Italy	6 – 3	Brazil

29 September 2003
10:00

Brazil	7 – 2	United States

29 September 2003
17:30

Andorra	1 - 5	Italy

30 September 2003
14:30

Andorra	3 - 5	Brazil

30 September 2003
17:30

United States	1 - 10	Italy

==== Group D ====
Team	Pld	W	D	L	GF	GA	GD	Pts
Portugal	3	3	0	0	24	4	+20	9
France	3	2	0	1	13	6	+7	6
Germany	3	1	0	2	5	12	−7	3
Netherlands	3	0	0	3	1	21	−20	0

27 September 2003
21:30

Portugal	4 – 3	France

28 September 2003
14:30

Netherlands	0 – 3	Germany

29 September 2003
14:30

France	4 – 1	Germany

29 September 2003
22:15

Netherlands	0 – 12	Portugal

30 September 2003
22:15

Portugal	8 – 1	Germany

30 September 2003
11:30

France	6 – 1	Netherlands

=== Championship Knockout stage ===
Quarter-finals
2 October
Spain	9
Angola	1
2 October
Italy	4
France	1
2 October
Argentina	7
Switzerland	1
2 October
Portugal	4
Brazil	1

Semi-finals
3 October
Spain	3
Italy	4
3 October
Portugal	2
Argentina	1

Final
4 October
Portugal	1
Italy	0
Third place
4 October
Spain	3
Argentina	1

=== 5th place bracket ===
Semi-finals
3 October
Angola	1
France	5
3 October
Switzerland	3
Brazil	5

Fifth place
4 October
France	1
Brazil	6
Seventh place
4 October
Angola	3
Switzerland	5

=== 9th to 16th place Knockout stage ===
Quarter-finals
2 October
Mozambique	7
Colombia	2
2 October
United States	2
Netherlands	3
2 October
Chile	7
England	0
2 October
Germany	4
Andorra	2

Ninth place
3 October
Mozambique	11
Netherlands	0
3 October
Chile	6
Germany	5

Final
4 October
Mozambique	2
Chile	4
Eleventh place
4 October
Netherlands	4
Germany	2

=== 13th place bracket ===
Semi-finals
3 October
United States	5
Colombia	0
3 October
Andorra	4
England	3

Thirteenth place
4 October
United States	5
Andorra	2
Fifteenth place
4 October
Colombia	6
England	4

== Final standings ==
Place	Team
Gold medal	Portugal
Silver medal	Italy
Bronze medal	Spain
4	Argentina
5	Brazil
6	France
7	Switzerland
8	Angola
9	Chile
10	Mozambique
11	Netherlands
12	Germany
13	United States
14	Andorra
15	Colombia
16	England

2003 Rink-Hockey World champions
Portugal
15th title
