= 1988 Roller Hockey World Cup =

Roller Hockey A Men's World Championships

Tournament details
- Host country: Spain
- Teams: 10 (from 4 confederations)
- Venue(s): 1 (in 1 host city)

Final positions
- Champions: Italy (3rd title)
- Runners-up: Spain
- Third place: Portugal
- Fourth place: Argentina

Tournament statistics
- Matches played: 45
- Goals scored: 299 (6.64 per match)

The 1988 Roller Hockey World Cup was the twenty-eighth roller hockey world cup, organized by the Fédération Internationale de Roller Sports. It was contested by 10 national teams (5 from Europe, 2 from South America, 2 from Africa and 1 from North America). All the games were played in the city of A Coruña, in Spain, the chosen city to host the World Cup.

== Results ==
Team	MOZ	BRA	FRG	ANG	NED	USA	ARG	POR	ESP	ITA
Mozambique										
Brazil	5–2									
West Germany	7–0	2–1								
Angola	2–3	4–1	4–1							
Netherlands	6–3	3–2	5–2	3–3						
United States	4–1	1–4	7–4	6–1	3–2					
Argentina	8–0	6–2	5–4	7–2	7–3	6–1				
Portugal	16–0	8–3	4–1	5–0	8–1	4–3	2–0			
Spain	8–0	4–1	7–0	12–0	8–1	4–2	3–0	2–1		
Italy	7–1	5–2	7–1	5–1	6–0	5–2	1–0	1–1	2–1	

== Standings ==
Team	Pld	W	D	L	GF	GA	GD	Pts
(gold) Italy (C)	9	8	1	0	39	9	+30	17
(silver) Spain	9	8	0	1	49	7	+42	16
(bronze) Portugal	9	7	1	1	49	11	+38	15
Argentina	9	6	0	3	39	18	+21	12
United States	9	4	0	5	29	31	−2	8
Netherlands	9	3	1	5	24	42	−18	7
Angola	9	2	1	6	17	43	−26	5
West Germany	9	2	0	7	22	40	−18	4
Brazil	9	2	0	7	21	35	−14	4
Mozambique	9	1	0	8	10	63	−53	2

(C) 1988 World Champion

== See also ==
- FIRS Roller Hockey World Cup
