= 2007 Rink Hockey World Championship =

2007 FIRS Roller Hockey World Cup
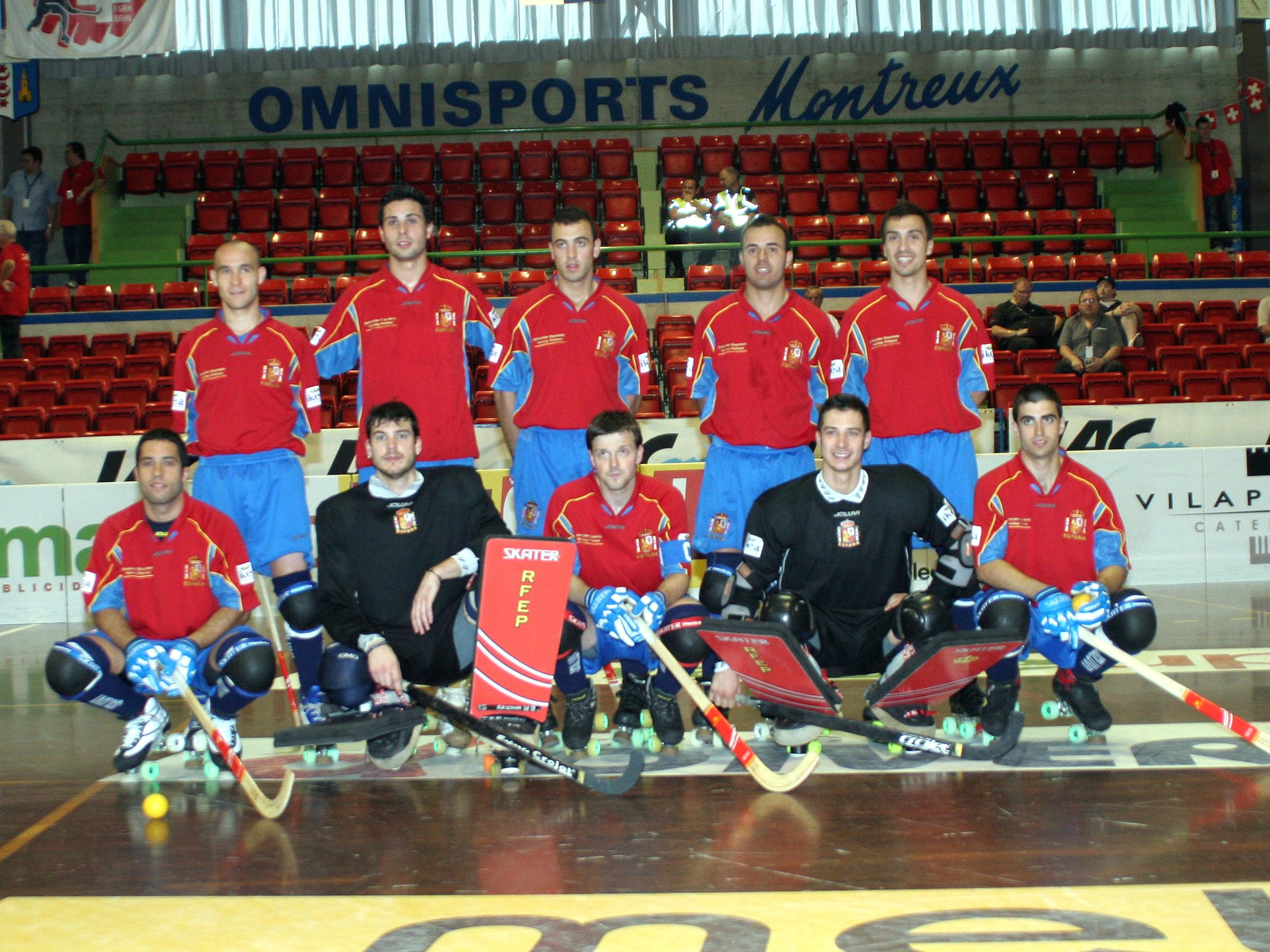

Tournament details
- Host country: Switzerland
- Dates: 16–23 June 2007
- Teams: 16 (from 5 confederations)
- Venue: Montreux

Final positions
- Champions: Spain (13th title)
- Runners-up: Switzerland
- Third place: Argentina
- Fourth place: Italy

Tournament statistics
- Matches played: 48
- Goals scored: 308 (6.42 per match)
- Top scorer: (Brazil) Jurandy da Silva (12)

The 2007 Rink Hockey World Championship was the 38th edition of the Rink Hockey World Championship, being held between 16 and 23 June 2007, in Montreux, Switzerland. It was disputed by 16 countries and it watched Spain achieving his 13th title, after an 8–1 win over Switzerland, in the final. The event marked the first time Switzerland reached the final of the most important international roller hockey competition. It also marked the worst performance ever for Portugal, with a disappointing 6th place.

== Format ==
The competition was disputed by 16 countries, divided in four groups of 4 teams each one. Unsurprisingly, the four major National Teams, Portugal, Spain, Italy and Argentina were divided by the four groups and they all won them. The two highest classified teams of each group would qualify for the knockout phase, starting with the quarter-finals. The winners would face each other at the semi-finals and then would advance for the final. The losers played for the 3rd place award.

Every game lasted 40 minutes, divided in 2 parts of 20 minutes.

== Phase I ==
=== Group A ===
Team	Pld	W	D	L	GF	GA	GD	Pts
Spain	3	3	0	0	20	2	+18	9
Brazil	3	2	0	1	12	12	0	6
Germany	3	1	0	2	9	10	−1	3
Colombia	3	0	0	3	4	21	−17	0

16 June 2007

Spain	7–1	Brazil

17 June 2007

Germany	6–1	Colombia

18 June 2007

Brazil	5–3	Germany

18 June 2007

Spain	9–1	Colombia

19 June 2007

Brazil	6–2	Colombia

19 June 2007

Spain	4–0	Germany

=== Group B ===
Team	Pld	W	D	L	GF	GA	GD	Pts
Argentina	3	3	0	0	20	2	+18	9
Angola	3	2	0	1	11	5	+6	6
Chile	3	1	0	2	3	10	−7	3
Netherlands	3	0	0	3	1	20	−19	0

17 June 2007

Chile	4–2	Netherlands

17 June 2007

Argentina	5–2	Angola

18 June 2007

Angola	2–0	Chile

18 June 2007

Argentina	9–0	Netherlands

19 June 2007

Angola	7–0	Netherlands

19 June 2007

Argentina	6–0	Chile

=== Group C ===
Team	Pld	W	D	L	GF	GA	GD	Pts
Portugal	3	3	0	0	22	5	+17	9
France	3	2	0	1	11	8	+3	6
United States	3	1	0	2	7	20	−13	3
Mozambique	3	0	0	3	9	16	−7	0

17 June 2007

United States	5–3	Mozambique

17 June 2007

Portugal	4–1	France

18 June 2007

France	6–2	United States

18 June 2007

Portugal	7–4	Mozambique

19 June 2007

France	4–2	Mozambique

19 June 2007

Portugal	11–0	United States

=== Group D ===
Team	Pld	W	D	L	GF	GA	GD	Pts
Italy	3	3	0	0	12	6	+6	9
Switzerland	3	2	0	1	7	5	+2	6
England	3	1	0	2	8	12	−4	3
Andorra	3	0	0	3	2	6	−4	0

17 June 2007

Andorra	1–2	England

17 June 2007

Switzerland	1–3	Italy

18 June 2007

Italy	6–4	England

18 June 2007

Switzerland	1–0	Andorra

19 June 2007

Italy	3–1	Andorra

19 June 2007

Switzerland	5–2	England

== Knockout Phase ==
=== Bracket ===
Quarter-finals
21 June
Spain	8
Angola	0
21 June
Italy	3
France	1
21 June
Portugal	2
Switzerland	3
21 June
Brazil	1
Argentina	2

Semi-finals
22 June
Spain	6
Italy	0
22 June
Switzerland	4
Argentina	3

Final
23 June
Switzerland	1
Spain	8
Third place
23 June
Argentina	3
Italy	2

=== 5th–8th places ===
Semi-finals
22 June
Angola	3(3)E
France	3(4)T
22 June
Brazil	3
Portugal	5

5th place
23 June
France	4
Portugal	3
7th place
23 June
Angola	1
Brazil	7

=== 9th–12th places ===
Quarter-finals
21 June
Germany	6
Netherlands	4
21 June
England	1
Mozambique	2
21 June
Chile	3
Colombia	2
21 June
United States	1
Andorra	4

Qualifying
22 June
Germany	2(2)G
Mozambique	2(3)P
22 June
Chile	1
Andorra	2

9th place
23 June
Mozambique	3
Andorra	1
11th place
23 June
Germany	2(5)G
Chile	2(6)P

=== 13th–16th places ===
Semi-finals
22 June
Netherlands	3
England	4
22 June
Colombia	3(4)E
England	3(3)T

13th place
23 June
England	4
Colombia	2
15th place
23 June
Netherlands	5
United States	3

- ET: Extra-Time
- GP: Penalties

== Final Placing ==
place	Team
Gold medal	Spain
Silver medal	Switzerland
Bronze medal	Argentina
4	Italy
5	France
6	Portugal
7	Brazil
8	Angola
9	Mozambique
10	Andorra
11	Chile
12	Germany
13	England
14	Colombia
15	Netherlands
16	United States

2007 Rink Hockey World Championship

13th title
