= Helia Sohani =

Iranian inline hockey player

- Born: Tehran, Iran
- Years active: 1995–present.

Helia Sohani (Persian: هلیا سوهانی ; born in Tehran, Iran) is the former captain and the player of the Iran women's national inline hockey team. At the present, she is a member of Iranian women's national in-line hockey team and in past years, she has been chosen as the coach of this team. She won her first bronze team medal in the Asian games of china as a player-coach in 2012. Then, she gained this place again in 2016 and 2018 in Asian games.

== Early life ==
Helia Sohani started skating in 1995, when she was 8. On a trip, despite her family's worries about her being injured while skating, she convinced them to continue skating by showing so much compassion and talent and, in the same trip, she started to learn how to skate without the help of a trainer and just by depending on her own natural talent. At first, she chose figure skating field but, over time and getting to know Roller hockey and with her coach's encouragements, she chose Roller hockey. She took part in international competitions as the first coach-player of Iranian women's national in-line hockey team and, after a short time, she started her activity as the captain of the Iranian women's national in-line hockey team and she held this place for years. In recent years, she has started working professionally in the field of ice hockey as a player and coach and now she held a place Iranian women's national ice hockey team.

== Coaching ==
Helia Sohani has been coaching for Iran's national in-line hockey team. At first, she was chosen as the coach assistant of the team in 2012. Then she continued her activity as the team's coach in 2014 and now she is the ice skating coach in Iran's ice box ski run.

== International achievements ==
- The fourth place in the world's best clubs in the field of in-line hockey (Hong Kong) 2009
- The third place in the fifteenth period of Asian roller skating competitions in in-line hockey (Hifi, China) 2012
- The fourth place in the sixteenth period of Asian roller skating competitions in in-line hockey (Haining, China) 2014
- The third place in the seventeenth period of Asian roller skating competitions of in in-line hockey (Lishui, China) 2016
- Taking part in the international in-line hockey competitions as the player and captain of Iran's international team (Vento, Italy) 2016
- The flag bearer of the skating sports caravan of Islamic republic of Iran in Asian roller skating Olympics (China) 2012 and 2016
- The third place in the eighteenth period of Asian roller skating competitions in in-line hockey (Namwon, South Korea) 2018

== National achievements in women’s in-line hockey ==
- Runner up in the country's in-line hockey teams open competition in 2007 with Shohadaye Qeitarieh team
- Runner up in the first period of the premier league competitions of Iranian women's in-line hockey in 2009 with Tehran-Aleph team
- Championship in the second period of premier league of Iranian women's in-line hockey games in 2010 with Tehran-Aleph team
- The third place in the third period of premier league of Iranian women's in-line hockey games in 2011 with Tehran-Aleph team
- Championship in the fourth period of premier league games of Iranian women's in-line hockey in 2012 with Tehran-Aleph team
- The third place in the fifth period of premier league games of Iranian women's in-line hockey in 2013 with Tehran-Aleph team
- Runner up in the sixth period of premier league games of Iranian women's in-line hockey in 2015 with Tehran-Aleph team
- Runner up in the seventh period of premier league games of Iranian women's in-line hockey in 2016 with Tehran-Aleph team
- Championship in the eighth period of premier league games of Iranian women's in-line hockey in 2017 with Tehran-Aleph team
- Championship in Iranian women's in-line hockey team open competition in 2018 with the I-Fitpro team
- Championship in the tenth period of premier league games of Iranian women's in-line hockey in 2019 with Canariam team

== Coaching and referee certifications ==
Helia Sohani owns the 3rd class certificate in coaching, from the world federation, and, the 3rd class certificate in in-line hockey from the Iranian federation. She also has the 3rd class coaching certificate of ice skating from the Iranian federation. Besides, she is the top coach of bodybuilding from Iran's national Olympic committee and, she has the 3rd class certificate of in-line hockey refereeing.

== Related activities ==
- Secretary of Roller skating community of Iran's skating federation (2008–2016)
- The Responsible for holding the in-line hockey premier league games
- Coach of Iran's national in-line hockey team
- Referee of Iran's in-line hockey premier league

== Cinema ==
=== Appearance in “No room for angels” (Jaee Baray Fereshteha Nist) cinematic documentary ===
Sam Kalantari decided to make a documentary called “No room for angels”, to demonstrate the struggles and achievements of the members of Iranian women's national roller hockey team in 2018 competitions of Namwon, South Korea. Helia Sohani has appeared in this documentary as the national team's player and one of the effective members of the team. Sam Kalantari, the director, to explain the trailer of the film, writes: “If they ask me one day that, what was one of the most beautiful days of my life, I would definitely say September 10th would be one of them….the day in which we celebrated your medal winning together…I learnt a lot from you guys and I’m proud of not only you, but also all of the girls of my country…but…the most interesting thing about this, is that on the first anniversary of your medal winning, your film is getting ready to be released…I have great respect for you and all the brave women of this country…” This cinematic documentary won the Crystal Simorgh award in the 38th Fajr Film Festival in the field of documentary, and, won the special jury award in the 13th international cinema-truth festival in the field of long documentary, and it also won the award of Art and Experience Cinema.
