= Roller Hockey World Cup U-20 =

Football tournament

- Current season, competition or edition: 2024 Roller Hockey World Cup U-20
- Sport: Roller hockey
- Founded: 2003
- No. of teams: 16
- Continent: International (FIRS)
- Most recent champions: Spain (7th title)
- Most titles: Spain (7 titles)
- Website: FIRS

The FIRS Roller Hockey World Cup U-20 is a biennial international competition for men's under-20 national roller hockey teams organized by the Fédération Internationale de Roller Sports (FIRS) since 2003. It takes place every two years and it was organized by the FIRS until its integration into World Skate in 2017 and is now part of the World Skate Games.

The current champions are Argentina, who secured their second title after beating Italy 4–1 in the 2022 edition's final.

== Results ==
Edition	Year	Host city	(gold) Gold	(silver) Silver	(bronze) Bronze	4th place
-	1999	Colombia	Argentina	Chile	France	Colombia
-	2002	Chile	Spain	Chile	Argentina	England
1	2003	(Uruguay) Montevideo	Portugal	Argentina	France	England
2	2005	(Argentina) Malargüe	Argentina	Spain	Chile	Brazil
3	2007	(Chile) Santiago	Spain	Portugal	Argentina	Chile
4	2009	(Italy) Bassano del Grappa	Spain	Portugal	Chile	Italy
5	2011	(Portugal) Barcelos	Spain	Portugal	Italy	Argentina
6	2013	(Colombia) Cartagena	Portugal	Spain	Argentina	France
7	2015	(Spain) Vilanova	Portugal	Spain	France	Italy
8	2017	(China) Nanjing	Portugal	Spain	Italy	Argentina
9	2019	(Spain) Barcelona	Spain	Argentina	Portugal	Italy
10	2022	(Argentina) Buenos Aires	Argentina	Italy	Spain	Portugal
11	2024	(Italy) Novara	Spain	Portugal	Argentina	Italy
12	2026	(Paraguay) Asunción	Spain	Portugal	Argentina	Italy

== Medal table ==
Rank	Nation	Gold	Silver	Bronze	Total
1	Spain	7	4	1	12
2	Portugal	4	5	1	10
3	Argentina	3	2	5	10
4	Chile	0	2	1	3
5	Italy	0	1	2	3
6	France	0	0	3	3
Totals (6 entries)		14	14	13	41

== See also ==
- Roller Hockey World Cup
- Women's Roller Hockey World Cup
