= WSE European U-17 Roller Hockey Championship =

Sporting tournament

WSE European Roller Hockey U-17 Championship
- Current season, competition or edition: 2026 WSE European Roller Hockey U-17 Championship
- Sport: Roller Hockey
- Founded: 1981; 45 years ago
- No. of teams: 8
- Continent: Europe (WSE)
- Most recent champion: Portugal (17th title)
- Most titles: Spain (22 titles)
- Website: Official website

The European Roller Hockey Juvenile Championship is an annual roller hockey competition for the under-17 national teams of Europe organised by World Skate Europe Rink Hockey.

Portugal are the current champions, after beating Spain in the final of the 2026 tournament, held in Braga, Portugal.

== Results ==
=== Tournaments ===
Year	Edition	Host city	(gold) Gold	(silver) Silver	(bronze) Bronze	4th Place
2026	44th	(Portugal) Braga	Portugal	Spain	France	Switzerland
2025	43rd	(France) Gujan-Mestras	Portugal	Spain	Italy	France
2024	42nd	(Spain) Olot	Portugal	Spain	Italy	France
2023	41st	(Italy) Correggio	Spain	Portugal	Italy	France
2022	40th	(Spain) Sant Sadurní d'Anoia	Spain	Portugal	Italy	France
2021	39th	(Portugal) Paredes	Spain	Portugal	Italy	France
2019	38th	(Portugal) Torres Vedras	Spain	Portugal	Italy	Switzerland
2018	37th	(Italy) Correggio	Spain	Portugal	France	Italy
2017	36th	(Italy) Fanano	Portugal	Spain	Italy	France
2016	35th	(Spain) Mieres	Spain	Portugal	France	Germany
2015	34th	(Portugal) Luso	Portugal	Spain	France	Italy
2014	33rd	(France) Gujan-Mestras	Italy	Spain	Portugal	France
2013	32nd	(Spain) Alcobendas	Portugal	France	Spain	Italy
2012	31st	(France) Ploufragan	Spain	France	Portugal	Italy
2011	30th	(Switzerland) Geneva	Spain	Portugal	Italy	Germany
2010	29th	(England) Northampton	Spain	Portugal	England	Italy
2009	28th	(France) Dinan	Portugal	Spain	France	Italy
2008	27th	(Italy) Bassano del Grappa	Portugal	Italy	Spain	France
2007	26th	(France) Nantes	Spain	Portugal	France	Germany
2006	25th	(Portugal) Sesimbra	Spain	Portugal	France	Germany
2005	24th	(France) Quimper	Portugal	Spain	France	Italy
2004	23rd	(Italy) Viareggio	Spain	Portugal	Italy	France
2003	22nd	(Switzerland) Wimmis	Spain	Portugal	Switzerland	Italy
2002	21st	(France) Saint-Omer	Spain	Portugal	France	Germany
2001	20th	(Portugal) Alcobaça	Spain	Portugal	Italy	Switzerland
2000	19th	(Germany) Walsum	Portugal	Spain	Italy	Switzerland
1999	18th	(Italy) Vasto	Portugal	Spain	Switzerland	Italy
1998	17th	(France) La Roche-sur-Yon	Portugal	Spain	Italy	France
1997	16th	(England) Barnsley	Spain	Portugal	Italy	England
1996	15th	(Portugal) Oliveira de Azeméis	Spain	Portugal	Switzerland	France
1995	14th	(Spain) Igualada	Spain	Portugal	France	Switzerland
1994	13th	(Switzerland) Montreux	Spain	Italy	Portugal	France
1993	12th	(France) La Roche-sur-Yon	Spain	Portugal	Italy	France
1992	11th	(Italy) Viareggio	Italy	Portugal	Spain	Switzerland
1991	10th	(Germany) Düsseldorf	Spain	Portugal	Italy	France
1990	9th	Andorra la Vella	Spain	Portugal	Italy	France
1989	8th	(Portugal) Anadia	Portugal	Italy	Spain	France
1988	7th	(Switzerland) Villeneuve	Italy	Portugal	Spain	Switzerland
1987	6th	(Italy) Vercelli	Portugal	Spain	Italy	Switzerland
1986	5th	(Portugal) Oliveira de Azeméis	Portugal	Italy	Spain	Switzerland
1985	4th	(Spain) Palma	Portugal	Italy	Spain	Switzerland
1984	3rd	(Italy) Viareggio	Italy	Spain	Germany	Netherlands
1983	2nd	(Portugal) Cascais	Italy	Spain	Portugal	France
1982	1st	(Netherlands) Zaandam	Italy	Portugal	Netherlands	Germany
1981	0th	(Netherlands) The Hague	Portugal	Italy	Spain	Germany

=== Medal table ===
Rank	Nation	Gold	Silver	Bronze	Total
1	Spain	22	14	8	44
2	Portugal	17	23	4	44
3	Italy	6	6	17	29
4	France	0	2	10	12
5	Switzerland	0	0	3	3
6	England	0	0	1	1
6	Germany	0	0	1	1
6	Netherlands	0	0	1	1
Totals (8 entries)		45	45	45	135
