= Pedro Gil Gómez =

Spanish roller hockey player (born 1980)

Pedro Gil
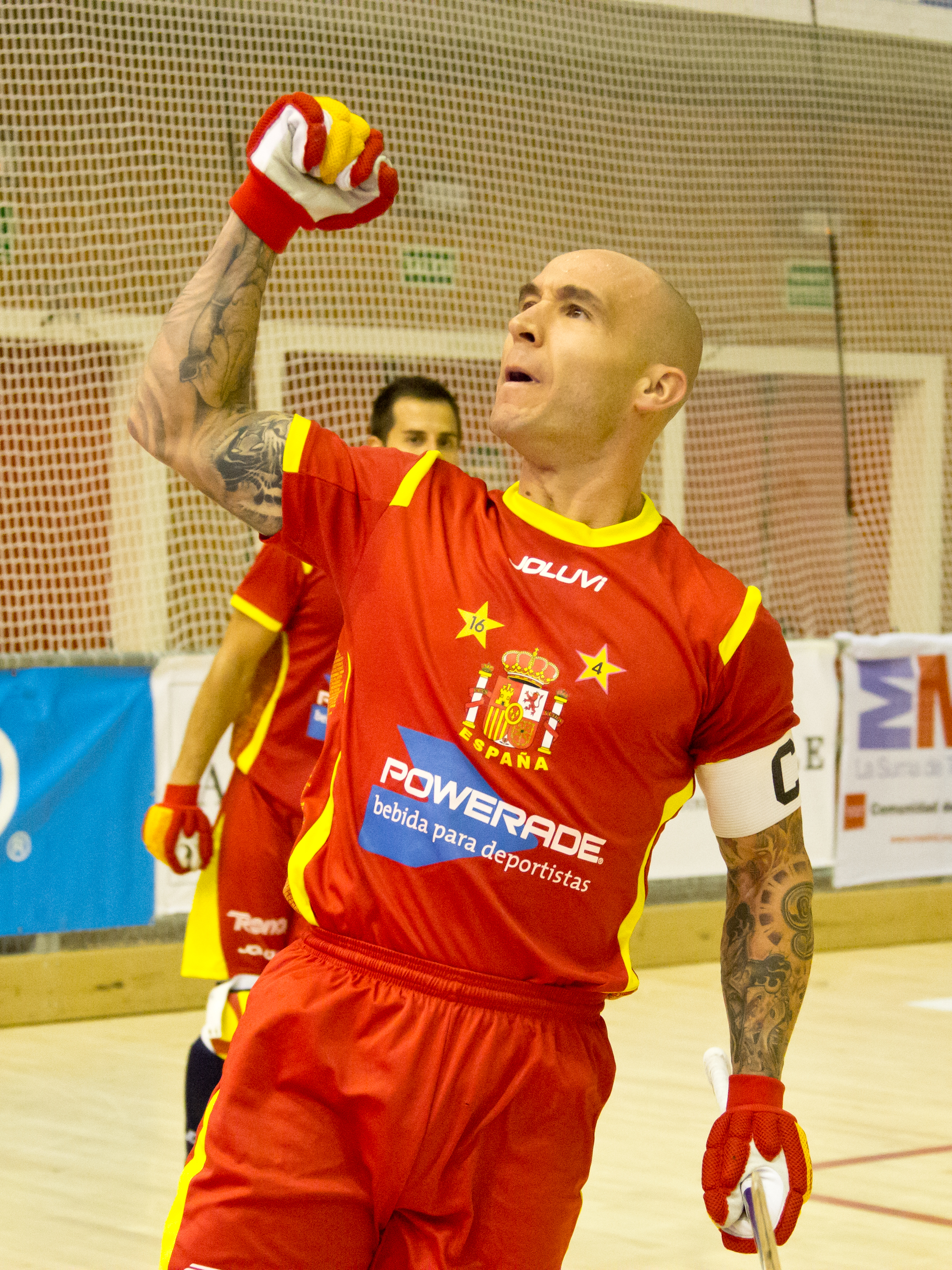
- Pedro Gil at the 2014 European Championship

Personal information
- Full name: Pedro Gil Gómez
- Nationality: Spanish
- Born: 26 April 1980 (age 46) Esplugues de Llobregat, Barcelona
- Years active: 1997–
- Height: 1.72 m (5 ft 7 1/2 in)

Sport
- Country: Spain
- Sport: Roller hockey
- Team: (Spain) CE Noia (1997–1998) (Spain) CP Tenerife (1998–1999) (Spain) CE Noia (1999–2000) (Portugal) Infante Sagres (2000–2002) (Portugal) FC Porto (2002–2007) (Spain) Reus Deportiu (2007–2009) (Portugal) FC Porto (2009–2012) (Italy) Valdagno (2012–2013) (Italy) Forte dei Marmi (2012–2016) (Portugal) Sporting CP (2016–)

Pedro Gil Gómez, better known as Pedro Gil (born 26 April 1980 in Esplugues de Llobregat, Barcelona), is a Spanish roller hockey player. He is notable for his speed, agility and goal capacity. He has been considered the best roller hockey forward player of nowadays.

== Club career ==
He start his career at Noia Freixenet, where he played in the youth categories, reaching the first team in 1997/98, winning the Copa del Rey and CERS Cup. He played the following season at CP Tenerife, returning to Noia Freixenet for 1999/2000. He moved to Infante de Sagres, in Portugal, where he played from 2000/01 to 2001/02. He reached stardom at FC Porto, where he won five National League titles, from 2002/03 to 2006/07. Returning to Spain, he played for Reus Deportiu, from 2007/08 to 2008/09, winning a European Cup and a Teams World Cup. Once again he was back for FC Porto, from 2009/10 to 2011/12, where he won two more National League titles. Moving to Italy, he was at Hockey Valdagno at 2012/13, winning in the same season the titles of the Italian League, the Cup of Italy and the Italian Supercup. He moved afterwards to HC Forte de Marmi, where he plays since 2013/14, winning in the same season the Italian League. In 2016, Pedro Gil goes to Sporting CP and in three seasons wins one Portuguese championship (2017–2018), one European Cup (2018–2019), two Elite cup (2016, 2018) and a Continental Cup.

== International career ==
He has been playing for Spain, since 2000, where he is considered the best player and has passed 100 caps. He is the captain since 2009. He has won 6 FIRS Roller Hockey World Cup titles, in 2001, 2005, 2007, 2009, 2011 and 2013, a 3rd place in 2003 and a 2nd place in 2015, and a record of 7 CERH European Roller Hockey Championship titles, in 2000, 2002, 2004, 2006, 2008, 2010 and 2012, and a 2nd place in 2014.

== Awards ==
For his contribution to sports he was awarded the Golden Medal of the Royal Order of Sports Merit in 2011.
