= 1993 Roller Hockey World Cup =

Roller Hockey Men's A World Championships

Tournament details
- Host country: Italy
- City: Bassano d.G., Sesto S.G.
- Teams: 12 (from 4 confederations)
- Venue(s): 2 (in 2 host cities)

Final positions
- Champions: Portugal (14th title)
- Runners-up: Italy
- Third place: Argentina
- Fourth place: Spain

Tournament statistics
- Matches played: 48
- Goals scored: 415 (8.65 per match)
- Top scorer(s): (Portugal) Rui Lopes (24)

The 1993 Roller Hockey World Cup was the thirty-first roller hockey world cup, organized by the Fédération Internationale de Roller Sports. It was contested by 12 national teams (8 from Europe, 2 from South America, 1 from North America and 1 from Africa). The tournament was played in the cities of Bassano del Grappa and Sesto San Giovanni, in Italy. This edition marks the debut of Andorra national hockey team.

== Group stage ==
=== Group A ===
Home \ Away	SWI	FRA	ITA	ARG	POR	USA
Switzerland		3–1	0–7	4–5	0–12	4–2
France			1–19	3–9	2–19	1–2
Italy				3–3	6–0	14–1
Argentina					5–8	7–2
Portugal						14–2
United States						

Team	Pld	W	D	L	GF	GA	GD	Pts	Qualification
Italy	5	4	1	0	49	5	+44	9	Advancing to quarter-finals
Portugal	5	4	0	1	53	15	+38	8	Advancing to quarter-finals
Argentina	5	3	1	1	29	20	+9	7	Advancing to quarter-finals
Switzerland	5	2	0	3	11	27	−16	4	Advancing to quarter-finals
United States	5	1	0	4	9	40	−31	2	
France	5	0	0	5	8	52	−44	0	

=== Group B ===
Home \ Away	GER	AND	NED	BRA	ANG	ESP
Germany		4–3	1–1	9–3	2–2	1–8
Andorra			7–4	0–8	2–0	2–5
Netherlands				3–7	2–2	2–8
Brazil					4–2	4–4
Angola						1–8
Spain						

Team	Pld	W	D	L	GF	GA	GD	Pts	Qualification
Spain	5	4	1	0	33	10	+23	9	Advancing to quarter-finals
Brazil	5	3	1	1	26	18	+8	7	Advancing to quarter-finals
Germany	5	2	2	1	17	17	0	6	Advancing to quarter-finals
Andorra	5	2	0	3	14	21	−7	4	Advancing to quarter-finals
Angola	5	0	2	3	7	18	−11	2	
Netherlands	5	0	2	3	12	25	−13	2	

== Final phase ==
=== 9th to 12th play-off ===
Home \ Away	USA	ANG	FRA	NED
United States		5–4	4–4	1–4
Angola			8–2	3–6
France				3–3
Netherlands				

Team	Pld	W	D	L	GF	GA	GD	Pts
Netherlands	3	2	1	0	13	7	+6	5
United States	3	1	1	1	10	12	−2	3
Angola	3	1	0	2	15	13	+2	2
France	3	0	2	1	9	15	−6	2

=== Final round ===
Quarter-finals
Spain	5
Switzerland	0
Portugal	11
Germany	1
Italy	11
Andorra	2
Argentina	9
Brazil	1

Semi-finals
Spain	1
Portugal	4
Italy	4
Argentina	3

Final
(gold) Portugal (pso)	3 (1)
(silver) Italy	3 (0)
Third place
Spain	2
(bronze) Argentina	3

Fifth–eighth places
Switzerland	5
Germany	3
Andorra	5
Brazil	7

Fifth place
Switzerland	3 (0)
Brazil (pso)	3 (1)
Seventh place
Germany	5
Andorra	6

== Standings ==
	Team
1st place, gold medalist(s)	Portugal
2nd place, silver medalist(s)	Italy
3rd place, bronze medalist(s)	Argentina
4th	Spain
5th	Brazil
6th	Switzerland
7th	Andorra
8th	Germany
9th	Netherlands
10th	United States
11th	Angola
12th	France

== See also ==
- FIRS Roller Hockey World Cup
