= Pui Ching Middle School (Macau) =

Private school in Macau

- 澳門培正中學; Escola Secundária Pui Ching

Location
- No. 7, Avenida de Horta e Costa; Macau, China
- Coordinates: 22°12′04.6″N 113°32′52.5″E

Information
- Type: Private school
- Motto: 至善至正 (Do the best and the rightest things)
- Religious affiliations: Baptists, Christianity
- Established: 1889; 137 years ago
- School district: São Lázaro
- President: Lo Weng Cheong (羅永祥)
- Principal: Kou Kam Fai (高錦輝)
- Faculty: Over 240
- Grades: 1 to 15
- Enrollment: About 3,200
- Language: Chinese, English
- Area: About 7,500 m^{2}
- Colors: Red, Blue
- Telephone: +853 2852 9333
- Fax: +853 28339056
- Website: www.puiching.edu.mo

Pui Ching Middle School

Chinese name
- Traditional Chinese: 澳門培正中學
- Simplified Chinese: 澳门培正中学
Transcriptions
Standard Mandarin
- Hanyu Pinyin: Àomén Péizhèng Zhōngxué
Yue: Cantonese
- Jyutping: ou3 mun4*2 pui4 zeng3 zung1 hok6

Portuguese name
- Portuguese: Escola Secundária Pui Ching

Pui Ching Middle School, Macau (Portuguese: Escola Secundária Pui Ching; Chinese: 澳門培正中學) is a private Baptist school in São Lázaro, Macau. It was established in 1938 as a sister school to Guangzhou Pui Ching Middle School and Hong Kong Pui Ching Middle School after the Japanese invasion of China caused the teachers of Guangzhou Pui Ching to flee to Macau.

== History ==
=== Guangzhou school ===
In 1889, Li Jiliang, Fengjing Qian, Liao Mountain, Lixian Shi, and Yang Haifeng and others decided to build a new school, similar to the Chinese Christian Schools that follow Christian doctrine. In Chinese, pui means 'cultivation' and ching means 'integrity' or 'uprightness'. The name is said to signify "Cultivate the children of the Church so they can be spared from the adulteration of secularism and build characters of uprightness and integrity".

For the first 30 years after its inauguration, the school experienced financial difficulties and suffered several temporary shutdowns. In response, supporters of the school launched the Pui Ching Upkeeping Association. In 1907, Pui Ching purchased land in the Dongshan district of Guangzhou with the long-term goal of opening a school site there. In 1918, Pui Ching alumnus Huang Qiming was appointed president and launched a fundraising campaign to mark the school's 30th anniversary. During this period Pui Ching students' physical and academic achievements gained recognition nationwide. Many universities offered preferred recruitment to Pui Ching school graduates, including Lingnan University, University of Shanghai, Yenching University, Private University of Nanking (now the University of Nanking), Central University (now the Central China Normal University), Guanghua University (defunct), and Qilu University (dissolved and merged into other universities and colleges).

By 1937, the school was well established. However the Sino-Japanese War that began that year had several effects on the school. In the Mukden Incident, before the war formally began, the Japanese repeatedly breached the Chinese border. Pui Ching students created a campaign called "The Anti-Japanese National Salvation", and organized propaganda teams to encourage patriotism. After the Marco Polo Bridge Incident in July 1937, Pui Ching moved its site to Heshan. In January 1938, the school moved from Guangzhou to Macau, and subsequently to Heshan, Ping Shek, Guilin, Hunan and Jiangxi.

After the Chinese victory in August 1945, most Pui Ching staff and students returned to Guangzhou from Macau.

=== Move to Macau ===
The Macau Pui Ching Middle School was founded during the Sino-Japanese War of 1937–1945, during which time Macau acted as a shelter for teachers and students from Guangzhou and Hong Kong. During the war, Pui Ching staff and students offered accommodation to displaced children and helped them study, and initiated a number of charitable campaigns including "A Cent Per Person Per Day", "Festival Clothes" and "Donate Warm Clothes".

After the Chinese victory in August 1945, most teachers and students returned to their original cities. Within a few months, Pui Ching's Guangzhou and Hong Kong schools had resumed their operations. Zhao Bilan, the widow of President Huang Qiming who had died in Hong Kong in 1939, continued to supervise the Macau school.

The school was initially a primary school. The junior high school and senior high school opened in 1947 and 1953, respectively. The school was renamed Pui Ching Middle School Macau in 1950 and became an independent non-profit private grammar school while maintaining connections with its sister schools in Guangzhou and Hong Kong.

Pui Ching rented Lou's Garden (a.k.a. Lou Lim Ieoc Garden) to serve as the school's campus from 1938 to 1952. In 1949, Pui Ching Macao opened four new classrooms to celebrate its tenth anniversary. In 1952, parents of Pui Ching students, Mr. Ho Yin and Mr. Chong Chi Kwong, purchased nearly half of Lou's Garden as the school's permanent site.

=== Post-war expansion ===
In 1952, two businessmen, Mr. Brian Ho and Mr. Ziguang Zhong (鐘子光), provided funding to support the expansion of the school in Lou Lim Garden (now the Lou Lim Park). The northern half of the land was already a permanent school site, and the funding supported a reorganization of the campus and expansion of school buildings, with new classrooms, an expanded stadium, new equipment, and teaching aides. A new school was set up in the high street Ke (now Horta e Costa).

In 1953, Principal Li Yanling was replaced by President Ice Fishing Fu, and then by President Lin Zhan in 1962. Lin Zhan's tenure came at a time of social unrest in Macau due to a recession. Teachers and students worked together to seek funding to stabilize the school. The curriculum of the secondary school was changed to a five-year format, emulating the Australian curriculum, with one year in Chinese; six college preparatory courses were offered in the fall of 1967. President Lin Zhan's campaign to build a 75th anniversary memorial was opened in 1972.

In 1974, Lin Zhan became Chancellor Emeritus and Kuang Bing-ren took over as president. He articulated three educational goals:

- To improve the quality of teaching, his top priority.
- To improve the learning environment. Three buildings were constructed in support of this goal, a classroom in D Block, a building to recognize the school's ninetieth anniversary (紀念培 building) and the Teaching Block E building.
- To maintain a rigorous and ethical environment. This goal encompassed the moral education of students through Christian faith-based, social services and moral, intellectual, physical, social and spiritual education.

In 1976, Kuang Bing-ren was appointed as president of the first Legislative Council by the Australian Governor. In 1981, he received the Portuguese civilian merit medal at the level of Commander, in recognition of his contribution to Macao's education. In 1985, he became Chancellor Emeritus.

Kangxian Yang was the next school president, serving from 1985 to 1995. He continued to uphold Bing-ren's three principles and introduced teacher training courses and teacher exchanges with Australia, Hong Kong, mainland China, Taiwan, and other localities to improve the standard of teaching. He also encouraged students to engage in extracurricular activities, to promote their all-round development. He continued to modernize the school buildings, including the Lou Kau Mansion, which was renovated as an administration building. In 1989, the Governor of Macao conferred a Medal of Merit on him in recognition of his efforts in education and training.

In 1995, Kangxian Yang became Chancellor Emeritus. The new president, Lixiang Li, continued the tradition of ongoing efforts to improve education. Notable developments included the founding of the "Pui Ching Journal", increased development of research programs, and the use of information technology. During Lixiang Li's tenure, the school was accepted as a member of the World School Organization, and was recognized by the UNESCO East China Normal University School of Teacher Education.

=== 21st century ===
In 2003, President Li Xiangli articulated a ten-year development plan for modernizing the campus, with the goal of constructing new classroom buildings. The campaign recognized the 115th anniversary of the school. Li Xiangli became Chancellor Emeritus in 2006 and was replaced by President High Jinhui. He oversaw several improvements in college buildings, including the construction of the 10-story Block H building, completed in 2009. Block H is a multi-functional teaching building with updated facilities, and is named the 120th Anniversary Commemoration Building"(Chinese: 創校120周年紀念大樓). Administration

In 2022 the school announced plans to open an English medium section.

== Curriculum and academic performance ==
Pui Ching Middle School is one of the leading schools in Macau, delivering excellent academic performances regionally and internationally. Pui Ching values both academic performances and moral behavior as a crucial part of student training and school life.

Like other schools in Macau, Pui Ching follows the policies authorized by the Macau government: the 2014 Curriculum Framework for Formal Education of Local Education System and the 2017 Requirements of Basic Academic Attainments (BAA). Under these policies the school has autonomy in the selection of textbooks, the decision of what to teach in different educational stages, and the depth and difficulty of the content to be taught.

Pui Ching has a strong reputation for STEAM Education relative to other schools in the Pearl River Delta. In the 1990s and 2000s, the University of Macau did not have enough space to accommodate all of the Macau students who had applied, and Pui Ching focused on preparing students for admittance to foreign universities. During that period, more than 90% of the school's graduates proceeded to tertiary academic institutions, but the students had to manage large course loads.

In 2009, Catherine Clayton commented that the school was known for encouraging its students to use creative ways to learn about the history of Macau, but that it did not directly teach this history. Chan Jileung (陳子良) and Wong Chao Son (黃就順), Pui Ching history and geography teachers, told Clayton that there were several reasons for this: the lack of a textbook about Macau history, the fact that such knowledge did not factor into the admissions processes of foreign universities, the already high course loads faced by students, and political sensitivities.

== Gallery ==
Panoramic Photo

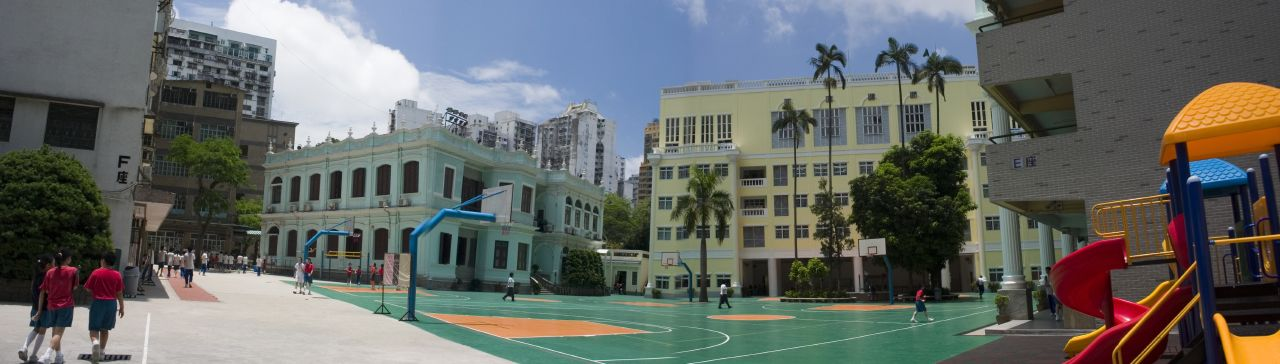
Panoramic Photo II

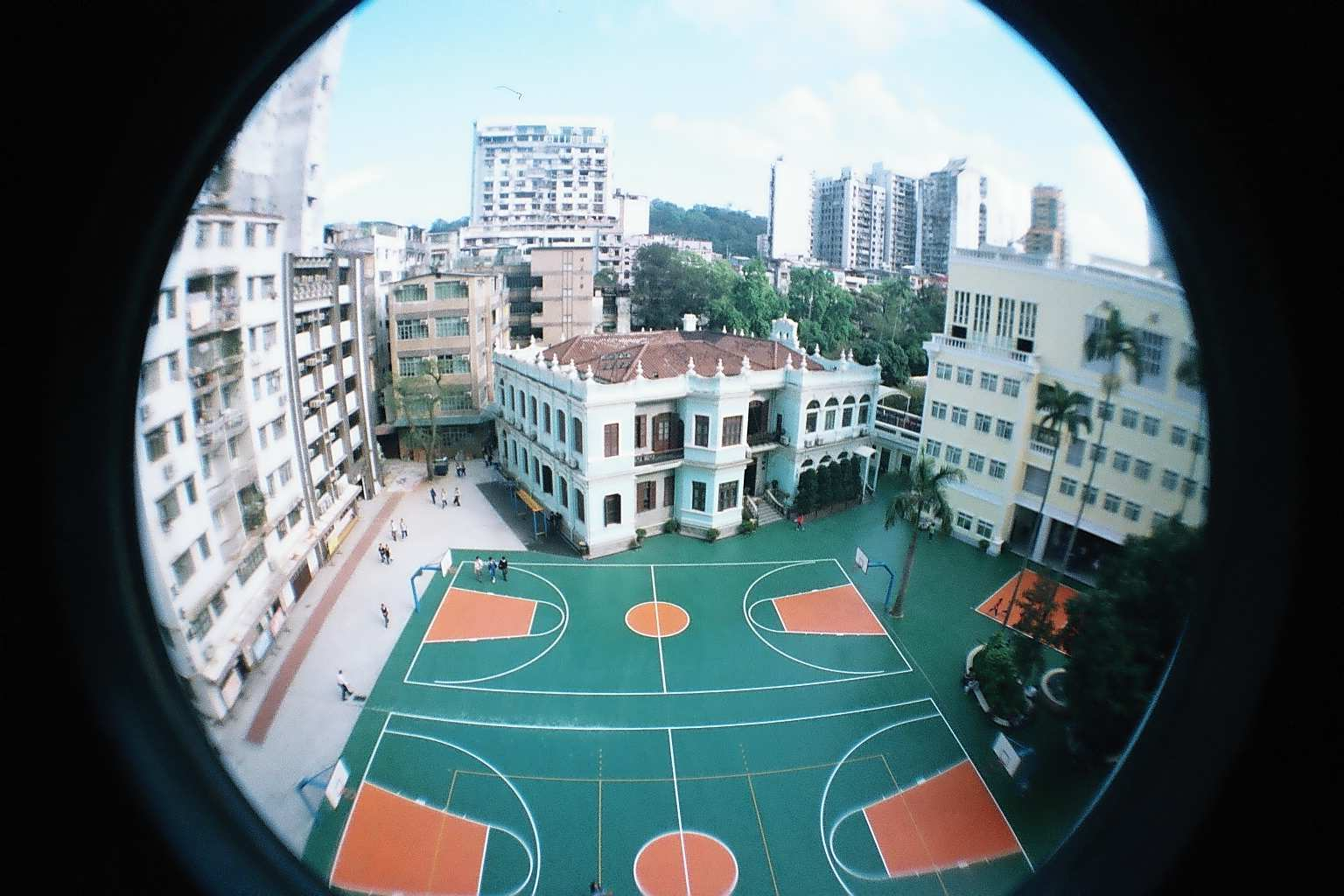
Overlooking from 5th Floor

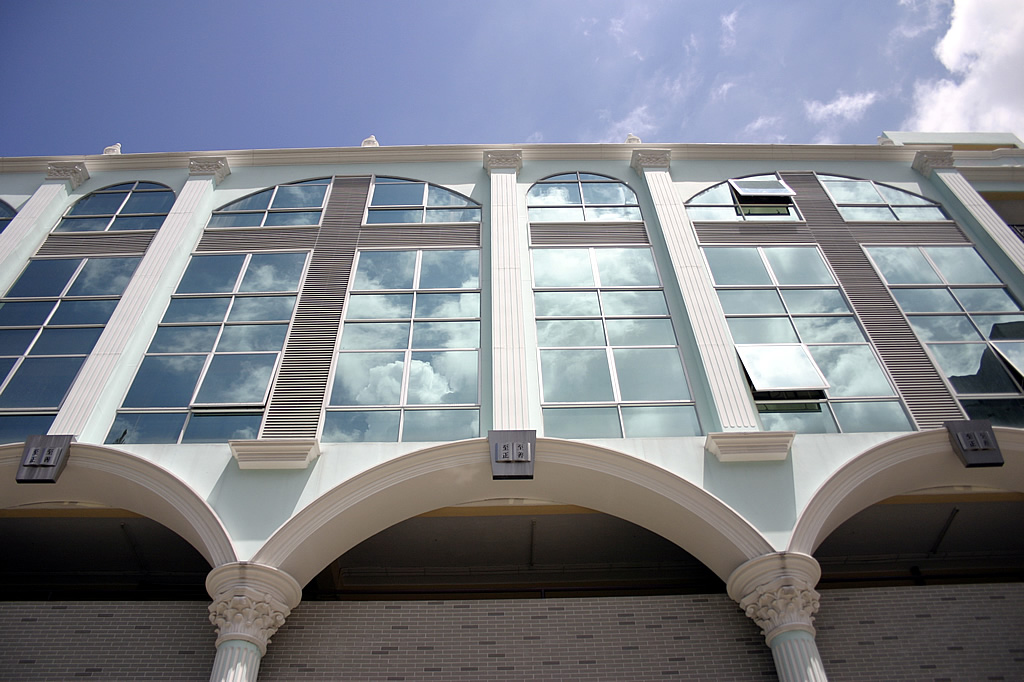
Block E after recondition

== Notable alumni ==
- Leong Lai – Director of Education and Youth Affairs Bureau (DSEJ)
- Sou Chio Fai – Director of Macau Tertiary Education Services Office
- Joseph Koo – Hong Kong composer
