= Roller Hockey Asia Cup =

Competitive sport

- Founded: 1987
- Region: Asia (CARS)
- Teams: 7
- Current champions: Taiwan (2nd title)
- Most championships: Macau (10 titles)

The Roller Hockey Asian Championship is a roller hockey competition with the national teams of Asian countries that happens every two years. It is organized by CARS, Confederation of Asia Roller Sports. The last Tournament happening was the 20th Asian Roller hockey Championship in Jeonju, South Korea.

== Results ==
=== Men ===
(1) Roller hockey was not contested at the 5th Asian Figure Skating Championships in 1993.

(2) The 13th Asian Figure Skating Championships were held in Dalian in late 2009, although the roller hockey competitions were postponed until early January 2010. The CARS subsequently decided that the championships would henceforth be held in even-numbered years, so the 14th Championship was held in Kaohsiung at the end of that same year. For this reason, two Asian Figure Skating Championships were held in 2010.

(3) The city of Macau was a colony of Portugal until December 20, 1999, after which it became a Special Administrative Region of the People's Republic of China. Despite this, it has always maintained its own national teams in several sports.

Year	Host city	(gold) Gold	(silver) Silver	(bronze) Bronze	4th Place
2025	(South Korea) Jeonju	Taiwan	India	Macau	Japan
2023	(China) Beidaihe	Taiwan	Australia	Macau	India
2018	(South Korea) Namwon	Australia	Macau	Japan	India
2016	(China) Lishui	Macau	India	Taiwan	Japan
2014	(China) Haining	Macau	Taiwan	Japan	India
2012	(China) Hefei	Macau	India	Taiwan	Australia
2011	(Taiwan) Kaohsiung	Japan	Taiwan	India	
2010	(China) Dalian	Macau	Japan	India	Taiwan
2007	(India) Calcutta	Macau	Japan	India	Pakistan
2005	(South Korea) Jeonju	Macau	Japan	South Korea	Taiwan
2004	(Japan) Akita	Macau	Japan	Australia	Taiwan
2001	(Taiwan) Taitung	North Korea	China	Macau	Japan
1999	(China) Shanghai	Japan	Macau		
1997	(South Korea) Kangnung	Macau	Japan	India	China
1995	(Japan) Nagano	Japan	Macau	China	South Korea
1991	(Macau) Macao	Macau	China	Japan	India
1989	(China) Hangzhou	Japan	Macau		
1987	(South Korea) Suwon	Macau	India	Japan	Taiwan
1985	(Japan) Okaya	Japan	India		

=== Medals (Men) ===
Rank	Nation	Gold	Silver	Bronze	Total
1	Macau	10	5	3	18
2	Japan	4	5	4	13
3	Taiwan	2	3	1	6
4	Australia	1	1	0	2
5	North Korea	1	0	0	1
6	India	0	4	4	8
7	China	0	2	1	3
Totals (7 entries)		18	20	13	51

=== Women ===
(1) The women's Roller Hockey championship was not held until the seventh edition in 1997. After being held consecutively in the ten subsequent editions, it did not take place in the seventeenth edition in 2016.

(2) The 13th Asian Figure Skating Championships were held in Dalian at the end of 2009, although the roller hockey competitions were postponed until early January 2010. The CARS subsequently decided that the championships would henceforth be held in even-numbered years, so the 14th Championship was held in Kaohsiung at the end of that same year. For this reason, two Asian Figure Skating Championships were held in 2010.

(3) The city of Macau was a colony of Portugal until December 20, 1999, after which it became a Special Administrative Region of the People's Republic of China. Despite this, it has always maintained its own national teams in several sports.

Year	Host city	(gold) Gold	(silver) Silver	(bronze) Bronze	4th Place
2025	(South Korea) Jecheon	India	Japan	Australia	New Zealand
2023	(China) Beidaihe	Australia	Japan	India	New Zealand
2014	(China) Haining	India	Japan	Taiwan	
2012	Macau	India	Taiwan	Macau	
2010	(Taiwan) Kaohsiung	Taiwan	India	Japan	
2010	(China) Dalian	India	Japan	Taiwan	Macau
2007	(India) Calcutta	India	Japan	Macau	
2005	Jeonju	Taiwan	India	Japan	Macau
2004	(Japan) Akita	Japan	Taiwan	India	
2001	(Taiwan) Taitung	Japan	China	India	Taiwan
1999	(China) Shanghai	Japan	China	India	Taiwan
1997	Kangnung	Japan	Macau	India	Taiwan

=== Medals (Women) ===
Rank	Nation	Gold	Silver	Bronze	Total
1	India (IND)	5	2	5	12
2	Japan (JPN)	4	5	2	11
3	Taiwan (TWN)	2	2	2	6
4	Australia (AUS)	1	0	5	6
5	China (CHN)	0	2	0	2
6	Macau (MAC)	0	1	2	3
Totals (6 entries)		12	12	16	40

== Junior ==
Since 1997

== See also ==
- Asian Roller Sport Championship (Asian Inline Hockey and Roller Derby Championship)
