= India men's national roller hockey team =

India
- Association: Roller Skating Federation of India (RSFI)
- Confederation: Confederation of Asia Roller Sports
- Head coach: (India) Harpreet Singh

Ranking
- Ranking: 29

The India men's national roller hockey team is the national team and represent India at international roller hockey. It is governed by the Roller Skating Federation of India (RSFI), it is full member of FIRS Roller Hockey B World Cup and Roller Hockey Asia Cup.

== Medal table ==
Competition	Gold	Silver	Bronze	4th
Asia Cup	0	3	4	3

== Honours ==
Roller Hockey Asia Cup

(silver) – 1987, 2012, 2016 , 2025

(bronze) – 1997, 2007, 2010, 2010
