= World Skate Asia =

Roller skating organization

World Skate Asia, formerly known as Confederation of Asia Roller Sports (CARS), is the main roller skating organization of Asia. World Skate Asia is part of the World Skate. Varieties of skating governed by the WS include:

- Inline downhill
- Roller hockey
- Inline hockey
- Inline speed skating

One of the most important events organized by CARS is the Roller Hockey Asia Cup.

== Asian Roller Sports Championship ==
Asian Roller Sports Championship is one of the biggest event in Asian Region For Roller Sport, it started in 1985, it is held every 2 years. The Confederation of Asia Roller Sports (CARS) is the main roller skating organization of Asia. The CARS is part of the International Roller Sports Federation, or FIRS. Varieties of skating governed by the CARS include:

- Speed skating
- Freestyle skating
- Artistic roller skating
- Roller hockey
- Inline hockey

One of the most important events organized by CARS is the Roller Hockey Asia Cup and Inline Hockey Asia Cup.

== Championships ==
Disciplines
No.	name
1	Inline Speed Skating (Speed)
2	Inline Freestyle Skating (Slalom)
3	Artistic Roller Skating (Artistic)
4	Roller hockey
5	Inline Hockey

Championships
No.	Year	Host city, Country
1	1985	, Japan
2	1987	
3	1989	
4	1991	
5	1993	
6	1995	
7	1997	Kangnung, South Korea
8	1999	Shanghai, China
9	2001	Taitung, Chinese Taipei
10	2004	Akita, Japan
11	2005	Jeonju, South Korea
12	2006	Kaohsiung, Chinese Taipei
13	2008	Haining, China
14	2010	Kaoshiung, Chinese Taipei
15	2012	Hefei, China
16	2014	Haining, China
17	2016	Lishui, China
18	2018	Namwon, North Jeolla, South Korea
19	2023	Qinhuangdao, Hebei, China
20	2025	Jecheon, South Chungcheong, South Korea

== See also ==
- Fédération Internationale de Roller Sports
- Roller sport
- World Skate
