= South Africa national roller hockey team =

South Africa
- Association: South Africa Roller Hockey Federation
- Confederation: FARS
- Head coach: (Portugal) Jorge Manuel Esteves

Ranking
- Ranking: 15

The South Africa national roller hockey team is the national team side of South Africa at international roller hockey. Usually is part of FIRS Roller Hockey World Cup. The team is based mostly in the Portuguese community radicated in South Africa.

== South Africa squad - 2010 Rink Hockey American Championship ==
Goaltenders
#	Player	Hometown	Club
1	Fernando Maia		ACPP
Field Players
#	Player	Hometown	Club
	Leandro De Araujo		ACPP
	Marco Van Tonder		Sporting Football Club Johannesburg
	Justin Da Costa		APF Vanderbijlpark
	Claudio De Araujo		ACPP
	Sergio De Araujo		ACPP
	Ricardo De Sousa		ACPP
	Renato da Silva		APF Vanderbijlpark
	Nelson Mendes		ACPP
	Raul Teixeira		ACPP
	Daniel Teixeira		APF Vanderbijlpark

Team Staff

- General Manager:
- Mechanic:

Coaching Staff

- Head Coach: Jorge Manuel Esteves
- Assistant:
