= Mozambique national roller hockey team =

Mozambique
- Association: Mozambique Roller Hockey Federation
- Confederation: FARS
Home colours	Away colours

Ranking
- Ranking: 9

The Mozambique national roller hockey team is the national team representing Mozambique in roller hockey competitions. The team has appeared at the FIRS Roller Hockey World Cup several times. Roller hockey has remained popular in Mozambique from its introduction during the colonial era by the Portuguese.

== Awards ==
Mozambique earned a fourth-place finish in the 2011 FIRS Roller Hockey World Cup A Class Championships, the highest ever finish for an African country. The team has had success in the B Class Championships several times, earning a gold medal in 2006,2019 and silver 2022 and bronze medals in 1986, 1992 and 1998.

== Titles ==
- B Roller Hockey World Cup (2):2006,2019
