= Israel national roller hockey team =

Israel
- Association: Israel Roller Skating Association
- Confederation: CERH
- Head coach: Radan Reis
- Captain: Lior Uliel

Ranking
- Ranking: 26

The Israel national roller hockey team is the national team side of Israel at international roller hockey. Usually is part of FIRS Roller Hockey B World Cup and CERH European Roller Hockey Championship.

== Israel squad - 2012 FIRS Roller Hockey B World Cup ==
Goaltenders
#	Player	Hometown	Club
1	Tomer Levi	Kiryat Tivon	Academia Galgiliot
10	Rotem Ben Eliezer	Ramat Yishay	CP Vilanova
Field Players
#	Player	Hometown	Club
3	Sa'ar Sharon	Nofit	Nofit
4	Lior Uliel (Captain)	Tzur Hadasa	Academia Galgiliot
5	Marcelo Bandersky	Karmiel	Ramat Yishay
6	Uri Liraman	Kiryat Bialik	CP Monjos
7	Dori Raz	Bustan HaGalil	Alona-Binyamina
9	Gay Israeli	Kfar Yehoshu'a	Ramat Yishay
2	Elad Salomon	Giv'at Ada	Alona-Binyamina
8	Shon Kurland	kiryat Bialik	Bialik

Team Staff

- General Manager:Pol Shnideman
- General Manager:

Coaching Staff

- Head Coach:Lucas Sorio
- Assistant:Marcelo Bandersky

== Titles ==
- FIRS Confederations Cup: (1)
  - 2017
