= Andorra national roller hockey team =

Andorra
- Association: Andorra Roller Sports Federation
- Confederation: World Skate Europe
Home colours	Away colours

Ranking
- Ranking: 11th

The Andorra national roller hockey team is the national team side of Andorra at international roller hockey. Usually is part of FIRS Roller Hockey B World Cup and CERH European Roller Hockey Championship.

== World Championship record ==
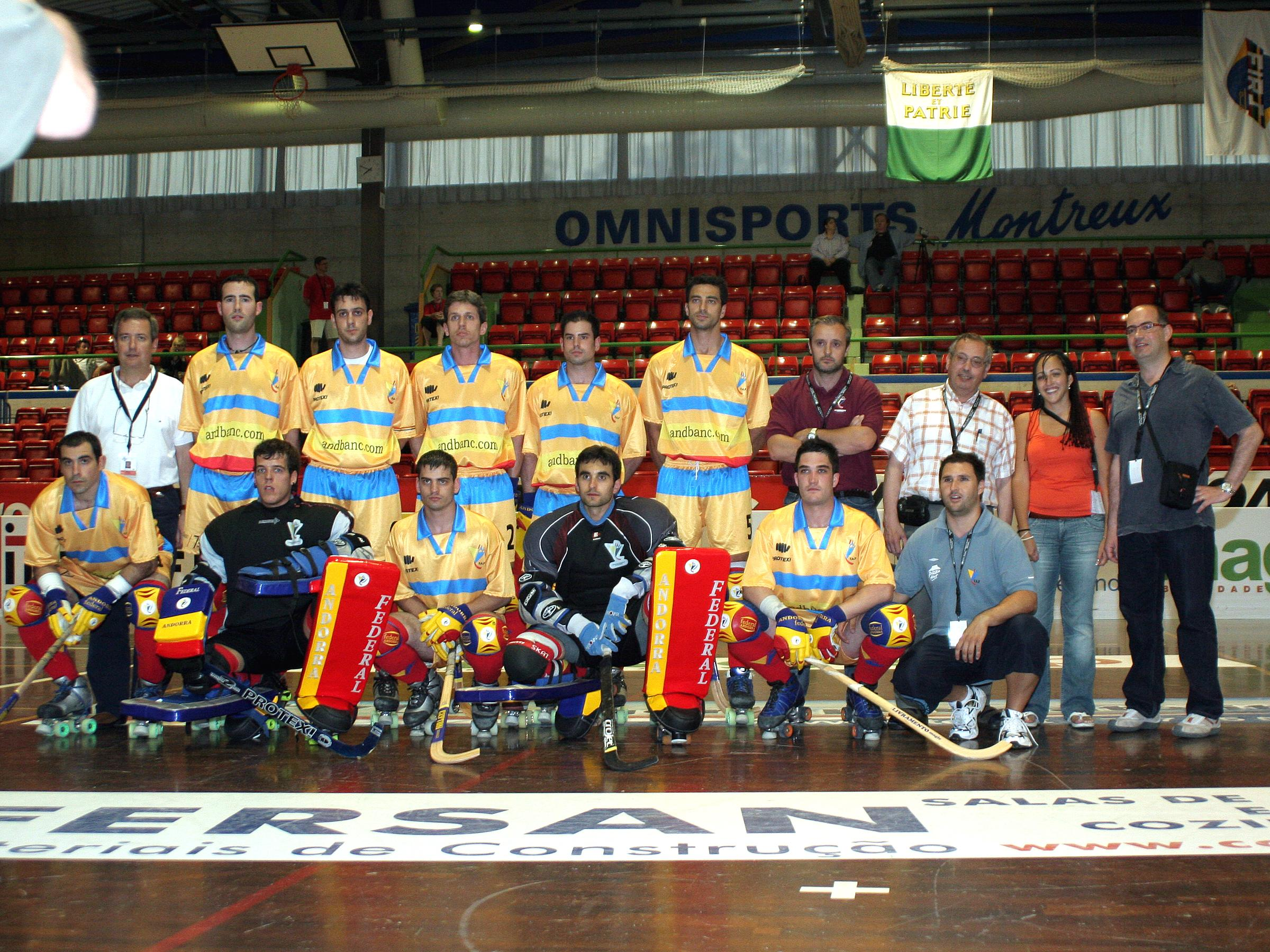
Andorra at the 2007 World Cup.

Year	Div.	Pos.	GP	W	D	L
(Macau) 1990	B	7th	9	6	0	3
(Andorra) 1992	B	1st	7	5	1	1
(Italy) 1993	A	7th	8	3	0	5
(Brazil) 1995	A	16th	8	1	0	7
(Mexico) 1996	B	4th	8	5	1	2
(Macau) 1998	B	4th	7	5	0	2
2000	Did not participate					
(Uruguay) 2002	B	1st	6	5	0	1
(Portugal) 2003	A	14th	6	1	0	5
(Macau) 2004	B	3rd	7	5	0	2
(United States) 2005	A	12th	6	2	0	4
(Switzerland) 2007	A	10th	6	2	0	4
(Spain) 2009	A	16th	6	1	0	5
2010–2018	Did not participate					
(Spain) 2019	10th		6	4	0	2
(Argentina) 2022	11th		6	3	1	2
(Italy) 2024	8th		6	2	2	2

== European Championship record ==
Year	Pos.	GP	W	D	L
(Germany) 1992	8th	9	2	1	6
(Portugal) 1994	10th	7	2	1	4
1996–2004	Did not participate				
(Italy) 2006	8th	7	1	0	6
2008–2016	Did not participate				
(Spain) 2018	6th	7	3	0	4
(Portugal) 2021	5th	6	1	1	4
(Spain) 2023	8th	6	2	0	4
(Portugal) 2025	5th	6	3	2	1

== Titles ==
- World Cup "B": (2)
  - 1992, 2002
