= Macau national roller hockey team =

Macau
- Association: Macau Roller Skating Association
- Confederation: CARS
- Head coach: Alberto Lisboa

Ranking
- Ranking: 20

The Macau national roller hockey team is the national team side of Macau at international roller hockey. It is usually part of FIRS Roller Hockey B World Cup and Roller Hockey Asia Cup.

== Macau squad - 2010 FIRS Roller Hockey B World Cup ==
Goaltenders
#	Player	Hometown	Club
1	Leong Chak In
Paulo Gibelino
Field Players
#	Player	Hometown	Club
Alfredo Almeida
Ricardo Atraca
Dinísio da Luz
Nuno Antunes
Hélder Ricardo
João Ramos
Alberto Lisboa

Team Staff

- General manager:Antonio da Silva Aguiar
- Mechanic:

Coaching Staff

- Head coach: Alberto Lisboa
- Assistant:

== Titles ==
- (gold) Roller Hockey Asia Cup – 1987, 1991, 1997, 2004, 2005, 2007, 2010, 2012, 2014, 2016 (10)

== See also ==
- Sports in Macau
