= Austria national roller hockey team =

Austria
- Association: Austria Roller Sports Federation
- Confederation: CERH
- Head coach: Stefan Reichen
Home colours	Away colours

Ranking
- Ranking: 16

The Austria national roller hockey team is the national team side of Austria at international roller hockey. Usually is part of FIRS Roller Hockey B World Cup and CERH European Roller Hockey Championship.

== Austria squad - 2010 FIRS Roller Hockey B World Cup ==
Goaltenders
#	Player	Hometown	Club
1	Andreas Künz
Marco Wagner
Field Players
#	Player	Hometown	Club
David Huber
Michael Schwendinger (Captain)
Michael Witzemann
Manuel Parfant
Martin Laritz
Jakob Stockinger
Thomas Simcic
Michael Hammerer

Team Staff

- General Manager:Karl-Heinz Speiser
- General Manager:

Coaching Staff

- Head Coach: Stefan Reichen
- Assistant:
