= Sport in Catalonia =

Overview of sports traditions and activities in Catalonia

Sport has an important incidence in Catalan life since the beginning of the 20th century. The main sports in Catalonia are football, basketball, handball, rink hockey, tennis, and motorsport.

One of the main sport events held ever in Catalonia were the 1992 Summer Olympics in Barcelona.

== Structure ==
Most of the Catalan Sports Federations have a lot of tradition and some of them participated in the foundation of International Sports Federations, as the Catalan Federation of Rugby, that was one of the founder members of the Fédération Internationale de Rugby Amateur (FIRA) in 1934.

Catalonia has officially recognised national teams in some sports competing in world and European championships as Catalonia, but in most sports Catalan sportspeople compete within Spanish national teams. The presence of Catalan national teams at international level has often met with opposition from the Spanish State, as happened in 2004 to roller hockey, known as the Fresno Case (see Rink hockey section below).

The best Catalan teams use to participate in European competitions.

== Main sports ==
=== Football ===
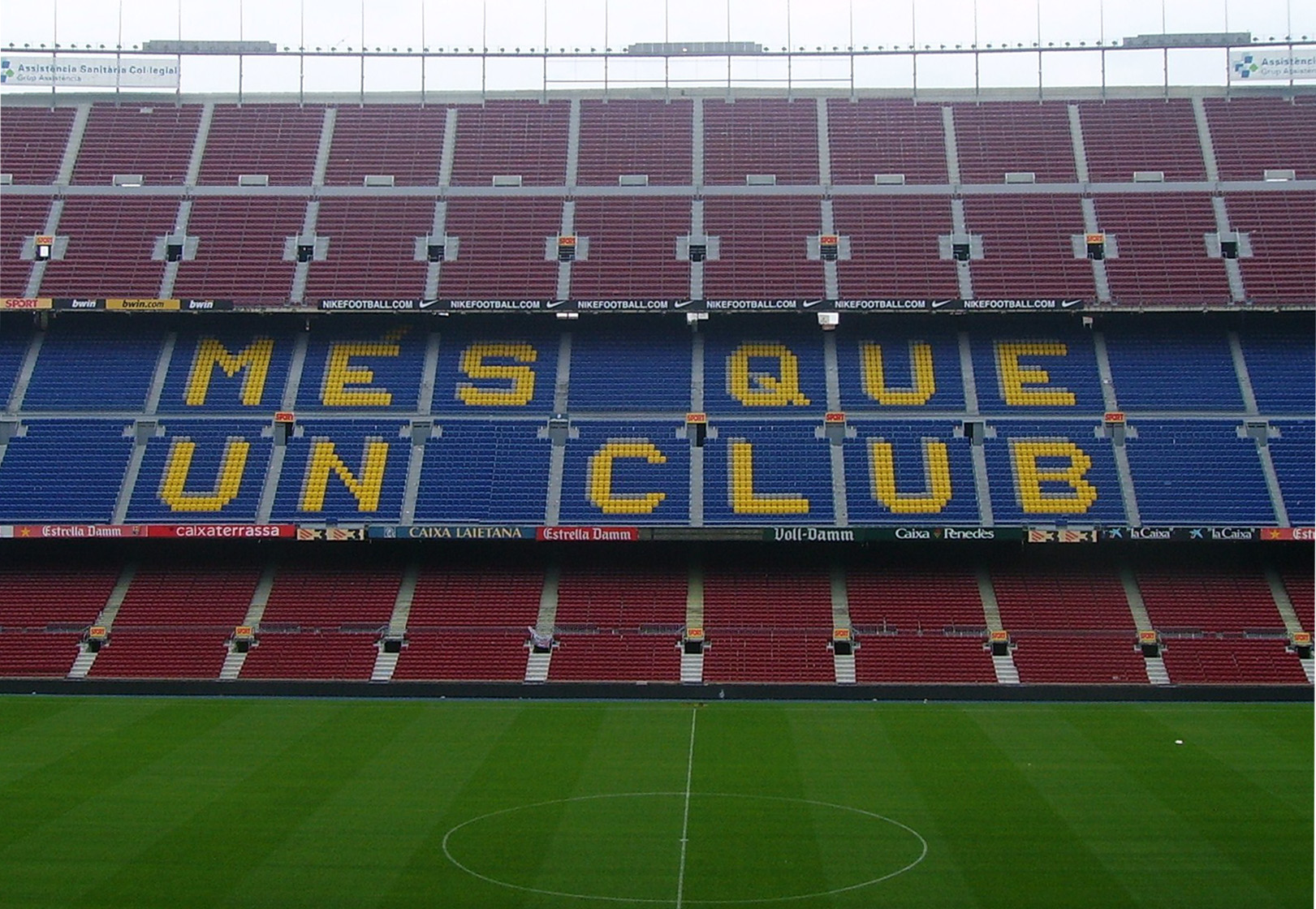
FC Barcelona stadium

Football is considered the most important sport in Catalonia and was introduced in the late 19th century by a combination of British immigrant workers, visiting sailors and students returning from Britain.

Catalonia also began to produce a number of football clubs including Palamós Foot-Ball Club founded in 1898 and Català FC and Foot-Ball Club Barcelona, both founded in 1899. Soon there were enough clubs to organize a league and in December 1900, Alfonso Macaya, the president of Hispania AC, offered a trophy, Copa Macaya, that eventually evolved into the Catalonia championships that were played until 1940, when they were disbanded during Franco's dictatorship.

Today, football in Catalonia is organized by the Catalonia Football Federation, founded in 1903, and teams from Catalonia compete in La Liga, the Copa del Rey, the Copa Catalunya and several European competitions as the UEFA Champions League and the UEFA Europa League.

The biggest clubs are FC Barcelona, which has won 5 European Champions leagues, 4 UEFA Cup Winners' Cups, and RCD Espanyol, which has been twice runner-up of the UEFA Cup. Both play in La Liga.

The Catalonia national team's first match was in 1912 in Paris, against France. In the recent years they have played with Argentina, Brazil, Basque Country and Colombia.

=== Basketball ===
Basketball was played for the first time in Catalonia in 1913, in the school Vallparadís of Terrassa, encouraged by Alexandre Galí and Artur Martorell. After the First World War the Frenchman Emile Tiberghien incorporated the basketball in his gym in Barcelona. Despite these early experiences, it is commonly accepted that basketball was introduced in Catalonia in 1922 by Father Eusebi Millan when organized the first team in the School "Escoles Pies de St. Anton" in Barcelona.

That year, 1922, was born the first club in Catalonia, the Basketball-Ball Laietà Club (now Club Esportiu Laietà). In those days, basketball was developed mainly through the educational centers and associations of popular and Catholic character. The first game is played in the field of CE Europa on 8 December 1922, with a final scoreboard: Europa 8-Laietà 2.

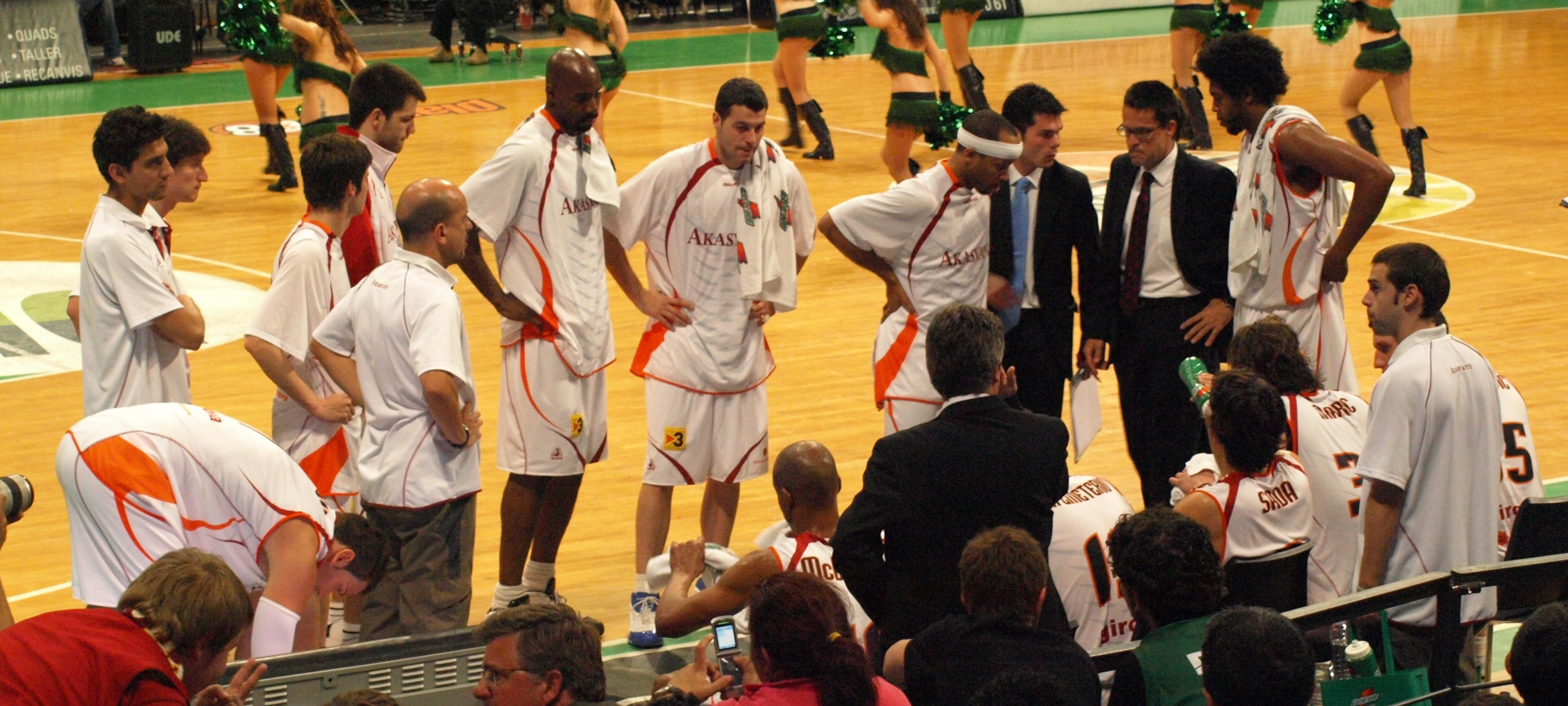
Former CB Girona

On 15 April 1923 began the first Catalan Basketball Championship that was played until 1957 (except the period of the Civil War). It was undoubtedly the most important competition held in Catalonia before the birth of the Spanish league.

Since 1980 the Catalan Basketball Federation organizes a new Catalan basketball league, played by the best Catalan teams of the ACB league.

FC Barcelona Bàsquet (2 Euroleagues) and Joventut Badalona (1 Euroleague) are the most successful Catalan basketball teams. Some Catalan players are or have been playing in the NBA, as Pau Gasol, Raúl López, Juan Carlos Navarro, Marc Gasol and Ricky Rubio.

=== Handball ===
In 1941 were played the first handball matches in Catalonia and one year later was founded a Handball Federation in Catalonia. Then handball was developed over Catalonia, increasing the number of teams every year, being 80 clubs in 1958. Barcelona held the first European Clubs Cup in 1958, a competition ideated by the French Federation.

For the decades of 40's and 50's some handball competitions were held with 11 players, like the Catalonia Championships. But finally the 7 players game was the one that continued.

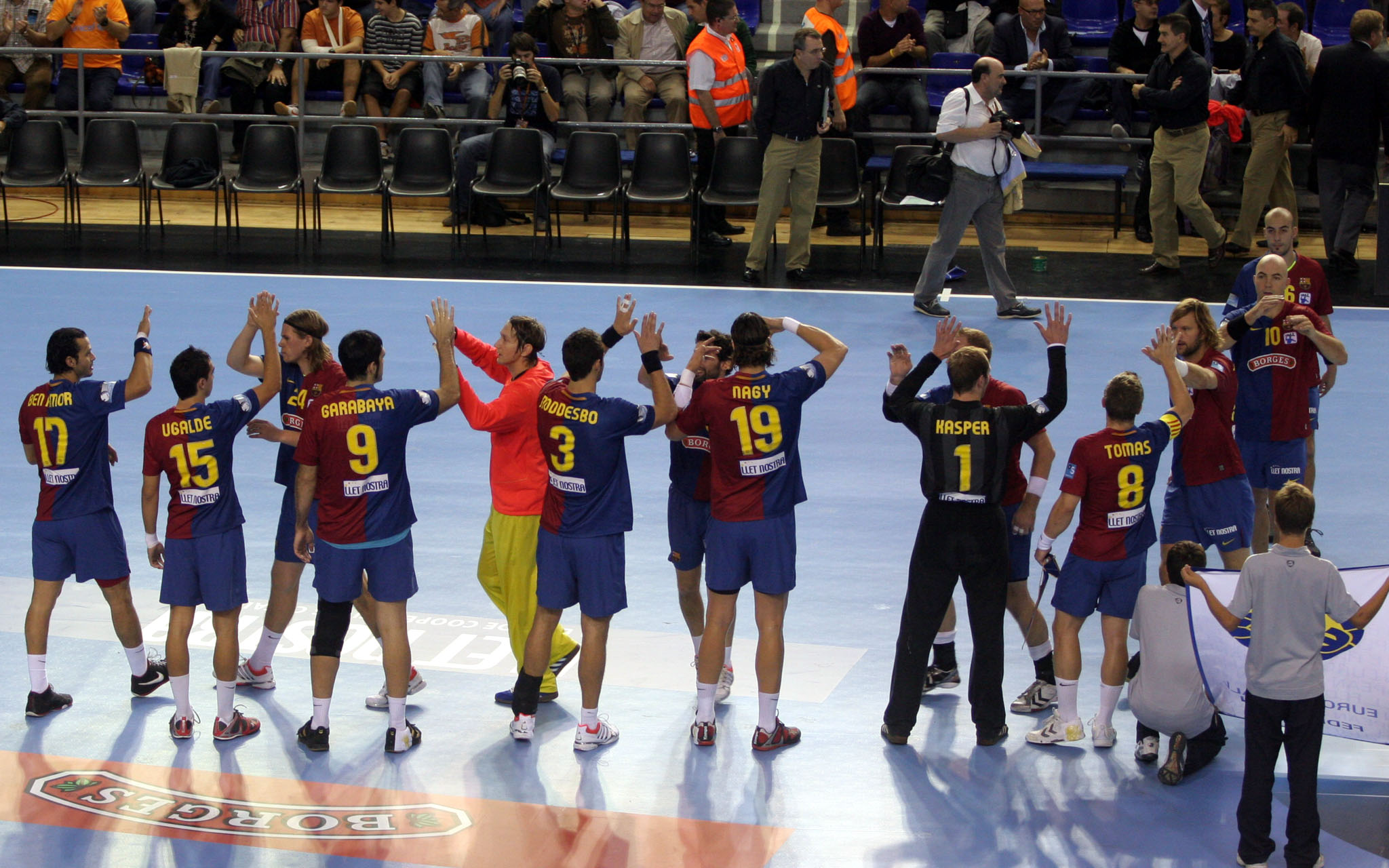
FC Barcelona

During the 80's and 90's decades the Catalan Federation organized the Catalan league, played by the best Catalan clubs. In 1997 was replaced by the Pirenees league adding teams from the south of France and the coorganization of the Ligue Languedoc Roussillon. FC Barcelona is the team that has won more times both competitions.

FC Barcelona is one of the best clubs of Europe, with 8 EHF Champions Leagues, 5 EHF Cup Winners' Cups, 18 Liga ASOBAL, 12 Catalan Leagues, 12 Pirenees leagues, and several more cups. BM Granollers is the other historical Catalan handball club that plays in the Liga ASOBAL.

Enric Masip is one of the best Catalan players ever, with 6 EHF Champions Leagues, 2 EHF Cup Winners' Cups and 7 ASOBAL leagues.

=== Rink hockey ===
The first rink hockey match played in Catalonia was in 1915 with the Indian Hoquei Club and the Sport Hoquei Club, but it were only the preliminaries. In 1925 some matches were played regularly and in 1928 was founded the Catalan Federation. The first Catalonia's Championship was played in 1930 and began a full developing for the sport around Catalonia.

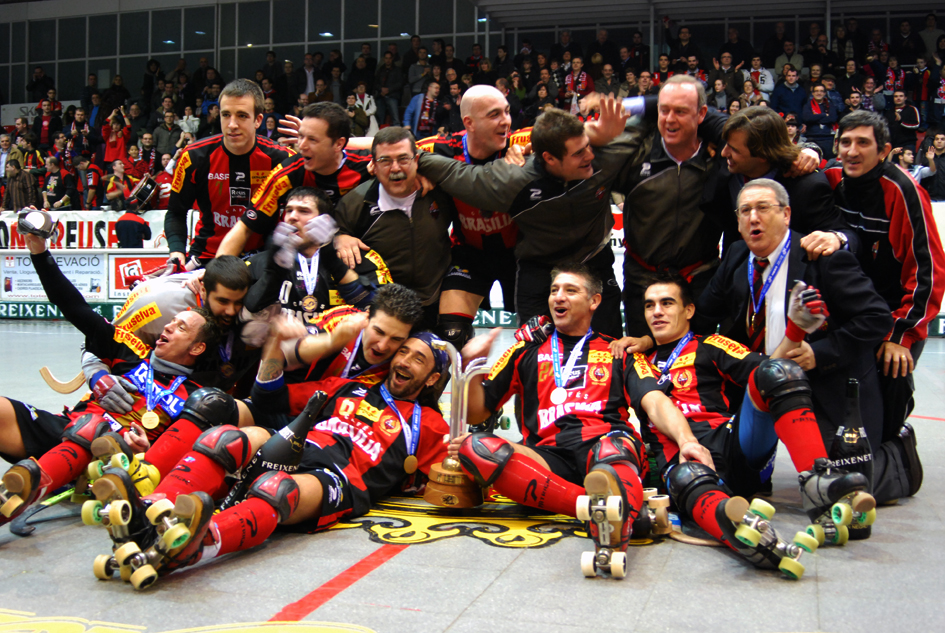
Reus Deportiu

The most successful teams are FC Barcelona, with 19 European League Championships, Reus Deportiu with 7 and Igualada HC with 6. They play in the OK Liga.

In the 1992 Summer Olympics, held in Barcelona, Roller hockey was one of three demonstration sports included in the official Olympic programme. This sport's widespread popularity and the existence of top-level competitive teams in Catalonia (such as FC Barcelona and Reus Deportiu) prompted the Organizing Committee to suggest its inclusion in the Olympic programme.

In 2004 the Federació Catalana de Patinatge was admitted by the International Roller Sports Federation (FIRS) as a provisional member, and as such it took part in the 2004 Rink Hockey World Championship B in Macau. Catalonia national team won all its matches and was crowned as 2004 B's World Champions and gained the right to be in the 2005 Rink Hockey World Championship. But in the following FIRS congress, in Fresno, the official recognition was revoked because of the opposition of the Spanish federation, in an assembly full of irregularities as the Court of Arbitration for Sport (CAS) ruled. in the case known as the Fresno Case. A new assembly was thus held in Rome, as the CAS verdict had decided, and Catalonia's application was rejected again. Because of this decision, Catalonia could not participate in the 2005 World Championship, that finally was won by Spain, with a team composed by all the players from Catalonia.

Since 2004, Catalonia national teams have competed in the Blanes Golden Cup with other national teams, winning the trophy six times by the men's team and three times by the ladies team.

In 2006 the Catalan roller skating Federation was admitted to the South American Rink Hockey Confederation and nowadays plays in the South American Championships. In 2010, the Catalonia men's team won the Copa América, and in 2011 the women's national team won also the competition.

=== Motorsport ===
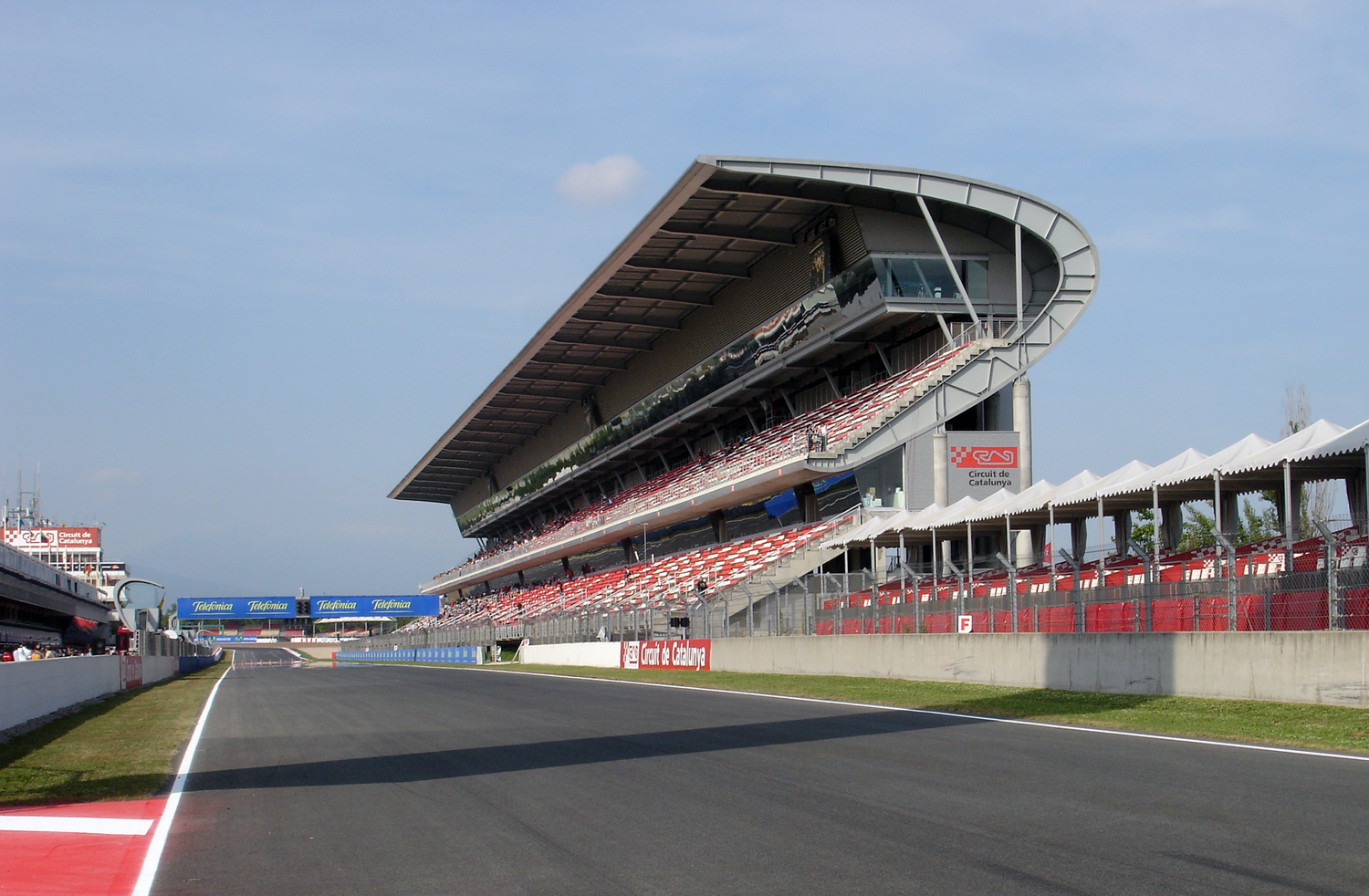
Catalonia Circuit

Motorsport has a long tradition in Catalonia involving many people, with some world champions and several competitions organized since the beginning of the 20th century. The Circuit de Catalunya, built in 1991, is one of the main motorsport venues, holding the Catalan motorcycle Grand Prix, the Spanish F1 Grand Prix, a DTM race, and several other races. Also of note is the Montjuïc street circuit which regularly hosted the Spanish F1 and motorcycle Grands Prix up to the 1970s.

Motorcycling is one of the historical sports, with motorcycle road racing world champions as Àlex Crivillé, Sito Pons, Emilio Alzamora and Dani Pedrosa. In addition Sete Gibernau was one of the top Grand Prix riders in the first half of the 2000s. Also there are many Catalan Motorcycle manufacturers as Derbi, Bultaco, Gas Gas, Montesa and OSSA.

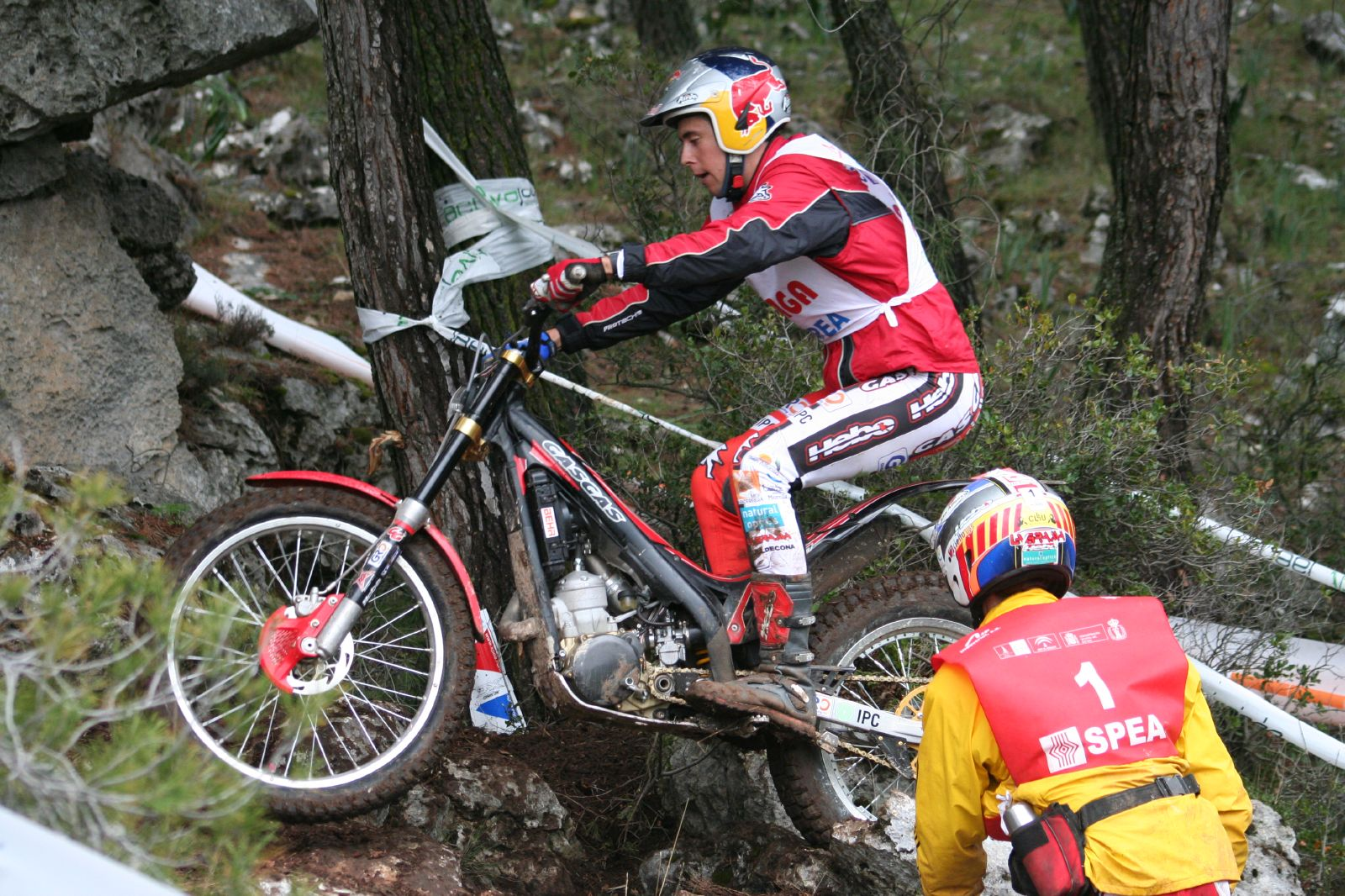
Adam Raga, World Champion

Motorcycle trials is also a sport practiced by many Catalans, as the world champions Jordi Tarrés (7 times), Adam Raga (6 times), Toni Bou (10 times) and Laia Sanz (11 times), and many competitions are organized around the country.

Rallies have several Catalan motorcycle champions as Nani Roma (1 Dakar Rally), Marc Coma ( 3 Rally Dakar and 3 times rallies cross country world champion), Jordi Arcarons (4 times runner-up in the Dakar Rally) and recently Laia Sanz (First Female Category Dakar Rally 2011). In car rallies, the Rally Catalunya is one of the races of the World Rally Championship since 1991. The first edition of Rally Catalunya was in 1957.

=== Tennis ===
Tennis began to be practiced in Catalonia in the late 19th century, in cities such as Barcelona or Reus, by some British people established in Catalonia and members of the Catalan bourgeoisie.

In 1904 was founded the Lawn Tennis Association of Barcelona, who joined as a full member in the Lawn Tennis Association (the international federation in those days). Later, in 1913, it was transformed into Lawn Tennis Association of Catalonia. In 1917 was played the first Catalan Tennis Championship. In all these tournaments, the Barcelona LT was an important organizer.

In 1923 was played the first Indoor World Championship in Barcelona.

Some Catalan players have won Roland Garros: Sergi Bruguera (1993, 1994), Albert Costa (2002) and Arantxa Sánchez Vicario (1989, 1994, 1998); US Open: Arantxa Sánchez Vicario (1994), and the Masters Cup: Àlex Corretja (1998). And also some medals have been won by Catalan tennis players in the Olympic Games: Jordi Arrese, silver in 1992, Sergi Bruguera, silver in 1996, Arantxa Sánchez Vicario, silver in 1996 and silver in 1992 in doubles.

The main tournament is Torneo Godó, held in Barcelona on clay surface.

== Sports with officially recognized Catalonia national team ==
=== Korfball ===
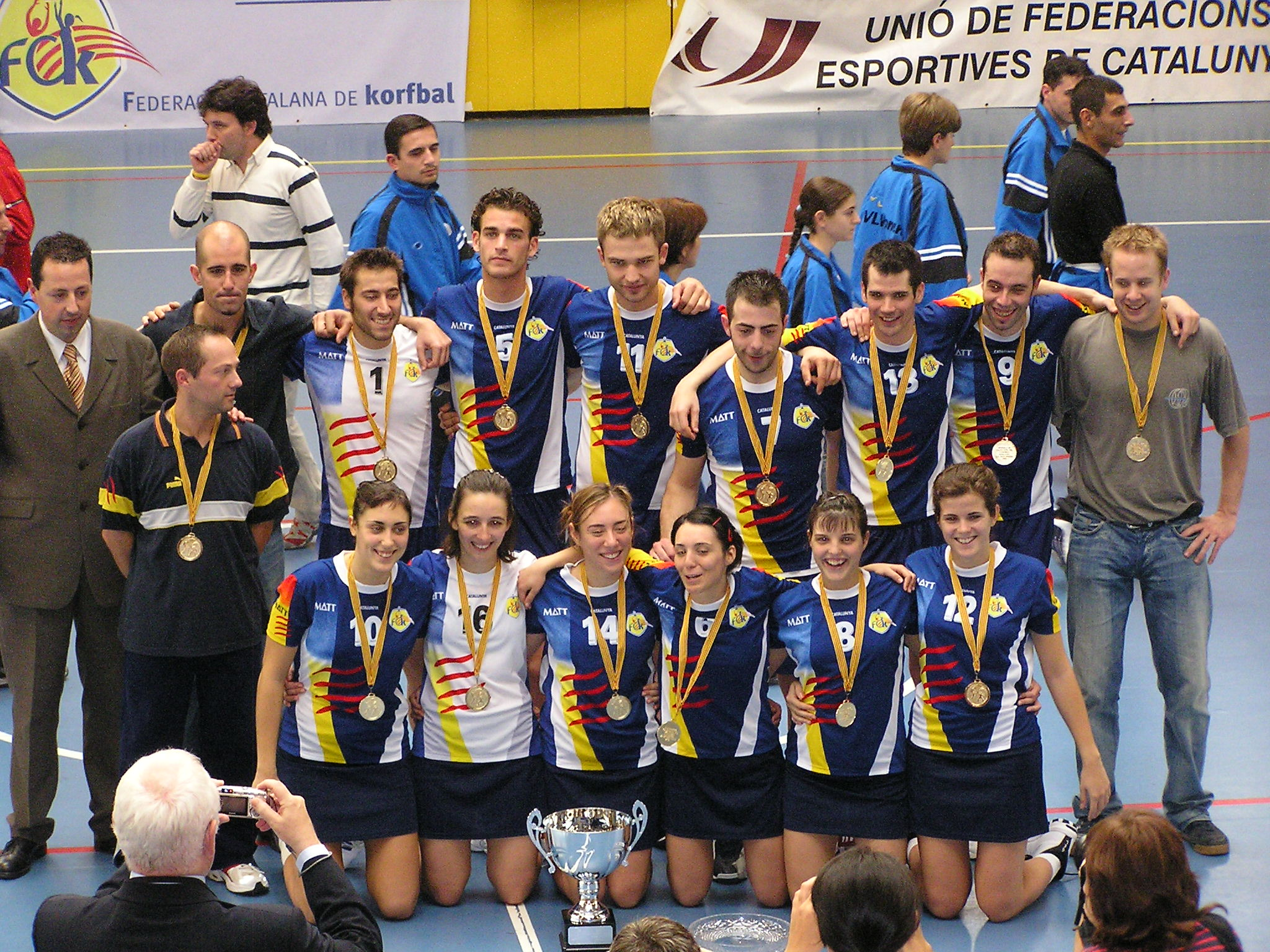
Catalonia, European Bowl 2005 champions

Korfball has been played in Catalonia since 1982, and is managed by the Catalan Korfball Federation (FCK).

In 1997 the International Korfball Federation admitted the Catalan Federation of Korfball as a provisional member, and in 2005 it was granted full membership.

Catalonia's national team has played 4 World Championships, reaching the 4th place in 2011, 3 European Championships -with a 5th place in 2010 and a 6th place in 2006- and has won the 2005 Korfball European Bowl.

The Catalan competition is divided into a "First division" and 2 "Second divisions" with a number of teams such as C.K. Vacarisses, C.E. Vilanova i la Geltrú, C.K. Assessoria Vallparadís, C.K. Cerdanyola, C.K. Badalona – La Rotllana, Sant Llorenç K.C., Unió Korfbalera Sant Adrià de Besòs, K.C. Barcelona, C.K. Castellbisbal, K.E.C.A., Korfball Valldemia and A.A.E.I.E.S. Secretari Coloma de Barcelona.

Club Korfball Vallparadís has won 2 Europa Shields, in 2009 and 2011.

=== Pitch and putt ===
Pitch and putt is played in Catalonia since the "1980s" when Martin Withelaw build a course in Solius (Santa Cristina d'Aro, Girona). The interest on Pitch and putt has been growing since then, with more than 14,000 players in 2008 associated to Catalan Federation of Pitch and Putt (FCPP), and more than 30 courses.

In 1999 the "Associació Catalana de Pitch and putt" was one of the founders of the European Pitch and Putt Association, the governing body that develops pitch and putt in Europe and stages a biennial European Team Championships, which Catalonia won in 2010 and has reached the second place three times.

In 2006 the "Federació Catalana de Pitch and putt" participated in the creation of the Federation of International Pitch and Putt Associations (FIPPA), that stages a World Cup, that Catalonia has won twice (2004 and 2006)

=== Futsal ===
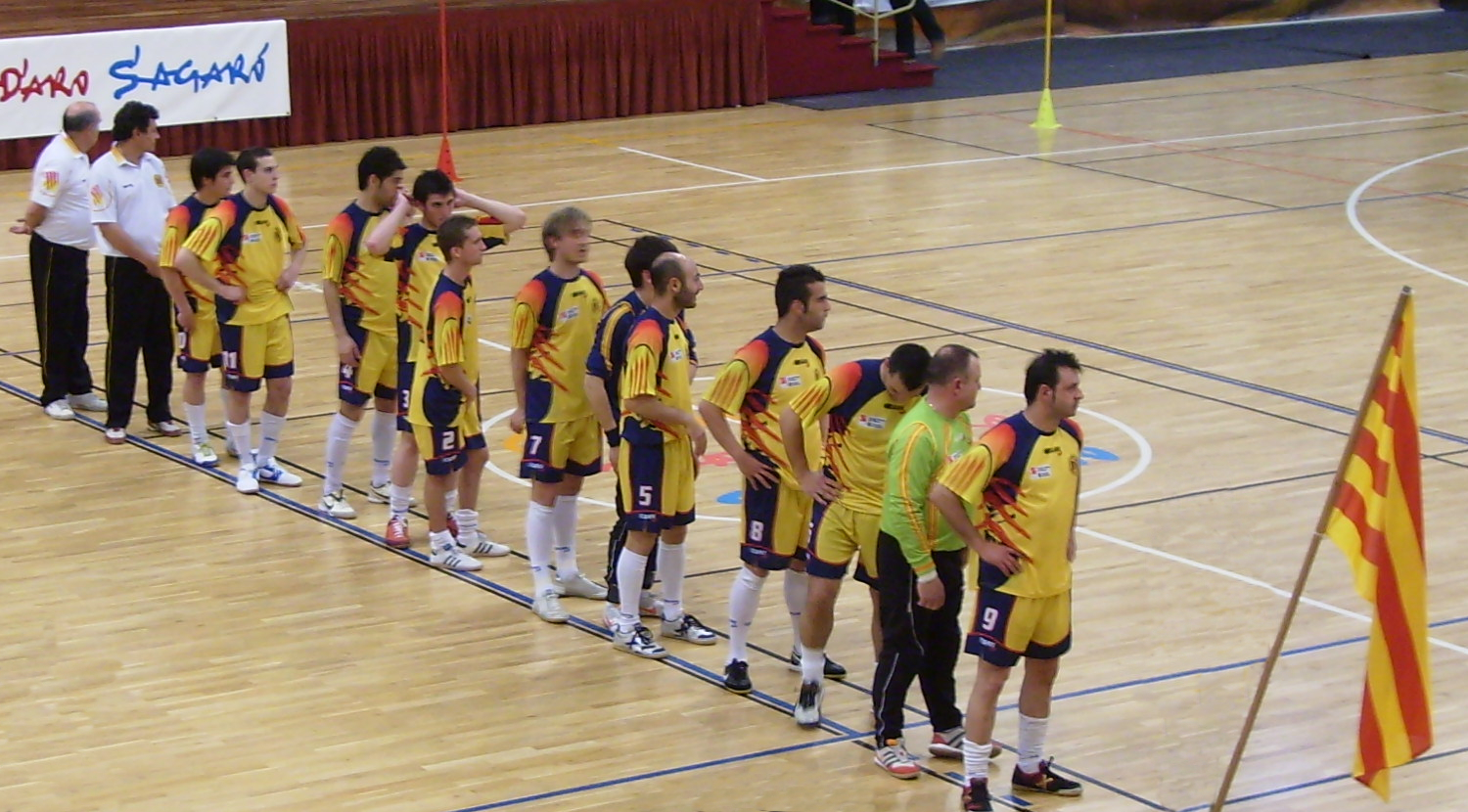
Catalonia national futsal team

Futsal in Catalonia is managed by Catalonia Futsal Federation (FCFS) (Federació Catalana de Futbol Sala), affiliated to European Union of Futsal in 2004 and recognised by the World Futsal association (AMF) in 2006. And it's also managed by Catalonia Football Federation (FCF) for the teams that play the FIFA game.

Catalonia national futsal teams represent Catalonia in AMF World Cups and UEFS Futsal Championships.

Catalonia men's national team has played five times the UEFS European Championships, reaching the second place in 2006, and twice in AMF Futsal World Cup, in 2007 and 2011. Also played in the 2007 AMF World Tournament in Yakutia, with the sixth place.

Catalonia women's national team were the Champions in the first Women's World Championship, held in Reus in 2008. In the European Championships 2004 were the runners-up.

=== Bowling ===
The Catalan Bowling Federation was admitted by the International Federation of Bowling in 2007.

In ten-pin bowling they have played in the World and European Championships, the AMF World Cup and the Mediterranean Challenge Cup.

In nine-pin bowling, Catalonia national team played in the 2011 World Championship in Sarajevo.

Catalan skittles (Catalan: Bitlles catalanes) are also an ancient Catalan game, early documented in years 1376 and 1402, that consists in knocking down exactly five of the six skittles.

=== Rugby league ===
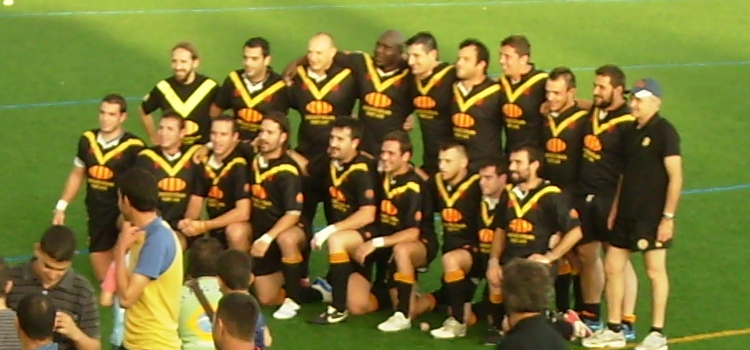
Catalonia national rugby league team in 2009

Rugby league in Catalonia is managed by the Catalan Association of Rugby League The Perpignan-based club Catalans Dragons, which plays in the Super League, is helping the development of rugby league in southern Catalonia.

The first competition took part in 2008, with 3 teams. In 2009 the first Catalonia Championship was played, with 9 teams.

Catalonia national team played their first competition in 2009, the RLEF Euro Med Challenge, with Morocco and Belgium. as opponents. Before this, they had played two test matches with Czech Republic and Morocco. In 2010 they played with Czech Republic in Prague.

=== Australian rules football ===
Australian rules football has been played in Catalonia since 2000 and is organized by the Catalan Australian Football League (LFAC). Catalonia is member of the Aussie Rules International and Aussie Rules Europe, and has played 4 European Cups (2005, 2007, 2008 and 2010).

The LFAC was officially created in 2005 and the first teams joining were Belfry Valls, Cornellà Bocs, Valls Fire and Alt Camp.

In 2009 the Catalan league is played by teams of several territories that speak Catalan language: Belfry Valls, Cornellà Bocs (southern Catalonia), Andorra Crows (Andorra), and Perpinyà (Northern Catalonia).

=== Touch rugby ===
Catalonia was admitted by the Federation of International Touch in 2009. They played the 2011 Touch Football World Cup in Scotland.

=== Darts ===
The Catalan Darts Federation was recognised by World Darts Federation in September 2011, playing the 2011 World Cup in Ireland.

=== Quidditch ===
The Associació de Quidditch de Catalunya was officially recognized as an independent NGB by the International Quidditch Association in 2015. Their first appearance was in the 2015 IQA European Games held in Sarteano, Italy. They reached seventh place out of twelve teams, beating Team Spain 160*–70.

== Other sports ==
=== Cycling ===
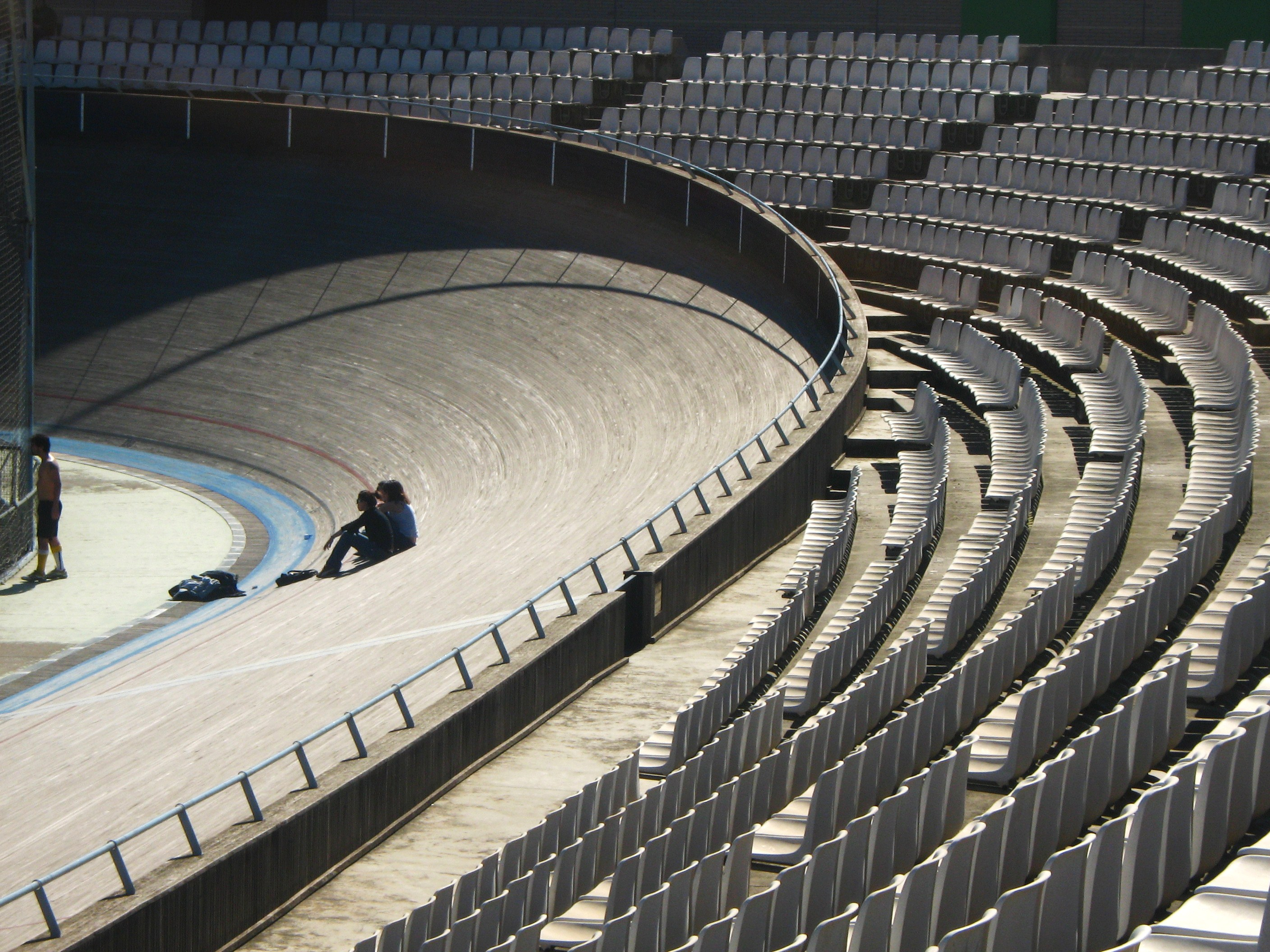
Horta Velodrome

In the same way as much of the rest of Europe, cycling was one of the first sports to gain popularity in Catalonia, since the 1880s. The first cycling body was the Club Velocipèdic of Barcelona (1884) followed by the Sport Ciclista Català. In 1893 the Bonanova velodrome was built with a length of 400 meters, considered one of the best in Europe at the time. In 1895 the Reus velodrome and in 1896 the Lleida velodrome were constructed.

In 1897 the Catalan Cycling Union was founded, which governed cycling in Catalonia.

In 1911 the first edition of Volta a Catalunya was held, making it the third oldest cycling stage race in the world, behind only the Tour de France (1903) and the Giro d'Italia (1909).

Other important races in Catalonia are the Setmana Catalana de Ciclisme (1963) and Escalada a Montjuïc (1965).

The main velodrome in Catalonia is the Velòdrom d'Horta.

=== Rugby union ===
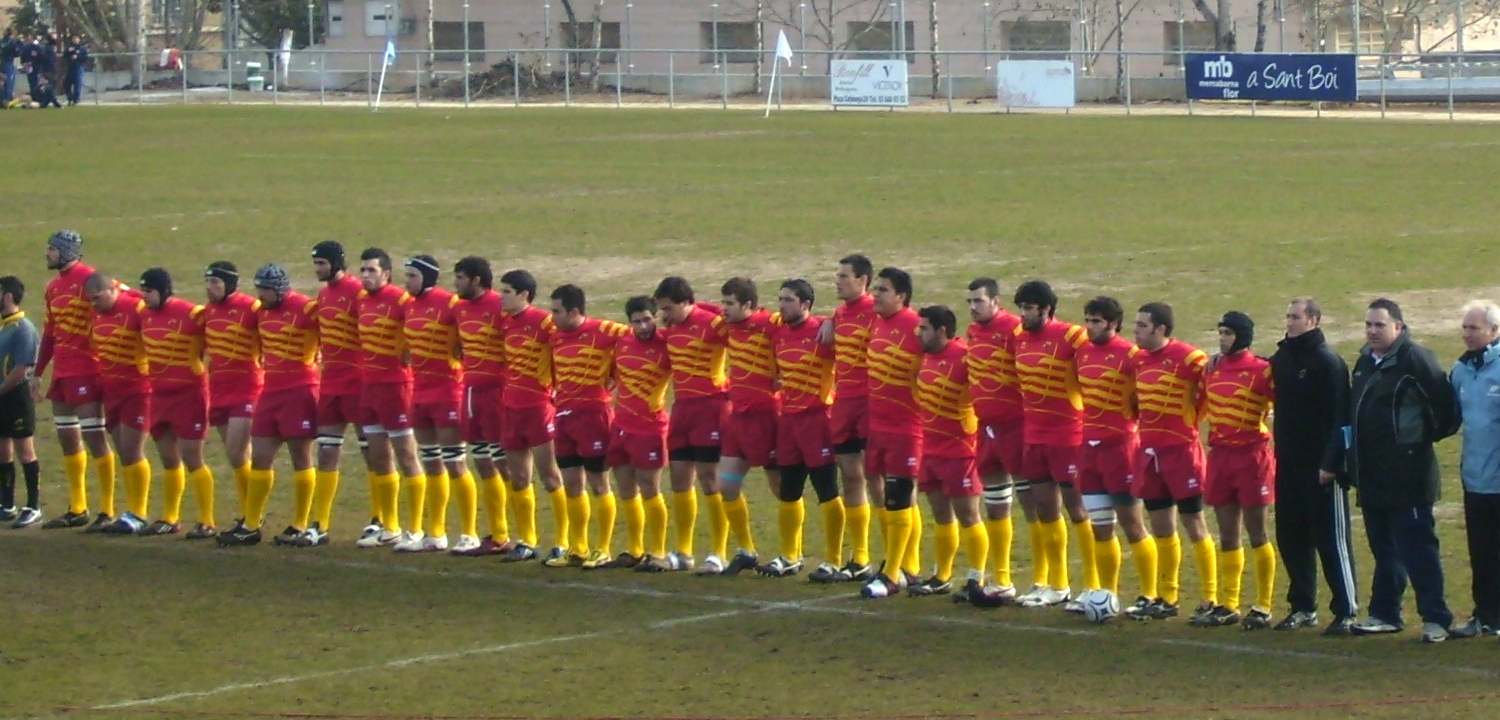
Catalonia national rugby union team vs Sweden

Rugby union was introduced in Southern Catalonia in 1921, when Baldiri Aleu i Torres founded the Unió Esportiva Santboiana. In 1922 the Catalan Rugby Federation was founded, which was one of the founding members of the Paris-based FIRA – Association of European Rugby, from which it was expelled at the behest of Franco's fascist regime. It has still to be readmitted.

In Southern Catalonia UE Santboiana, who have won the Spanish championship seven times, and FC Barcelona, are the best Catalan rugby union teams that compete in the División de Honor.

In Northern Catalonia, USA Perpignan are the best-known Catalan club. They compete in the French Top 14 and also in European competitions.

=== Water sports ===
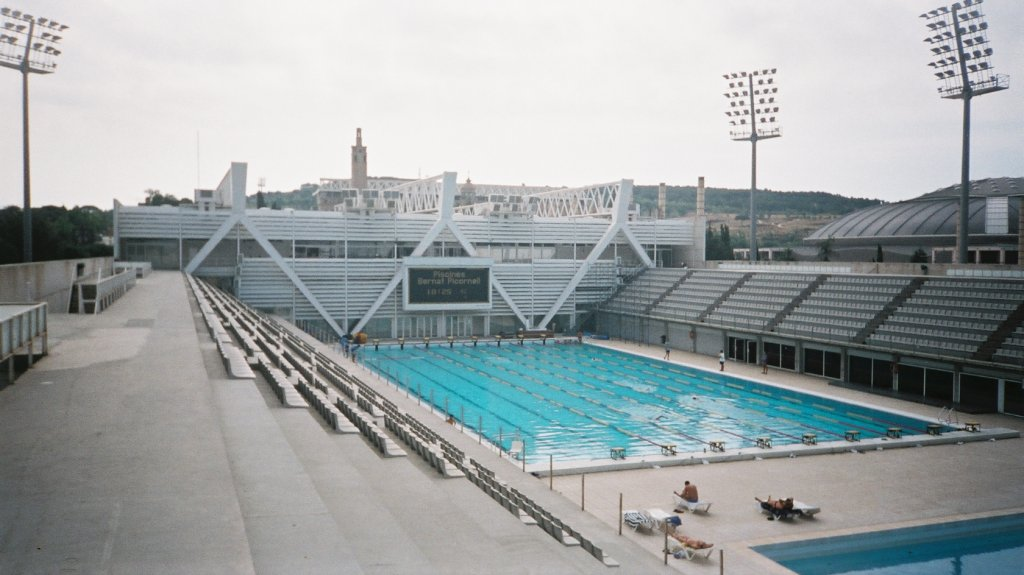
Bernat Picornell's swimming pool

Swimming was introduced in Catalonia by Bernat Picornell, founder of Club Natació Barcelona in 1907. In 1908 this club organized the first Copa Nadal swimming race in the Barcelona Harbour and the first water polo match. Main waterpolo clubs are CN Barcelona (1 Euroleague), CN Catalunya (1 Euroleague), CNA Barceloneta and CN Sabadell (1 LEN Women's Champions' Cup).

In synchronized swimming, Gemma Mengual is the best swimmer, and the best club is CN Kallipolis.

=== Field hockey ===
In 1907, alumni of the Ateneu Calasanç in Terrassa began playing field hockey, a sport that already practiced the English people living in Catalonia, and founded the Lawn Hoquei Club Calassanç in 1911. Terrassa is where traditionally has been practised, with a lot of teams as Egara (2 EuroHockey Club Champions Cup), Atlètic de Terrassa (2 EuroHockey Club Champions Cup, RC Polo (1 EuroHockey Club Champions Cup) and CD Terrassa.

== Major sports facilities ==
Palau Sant Jordi

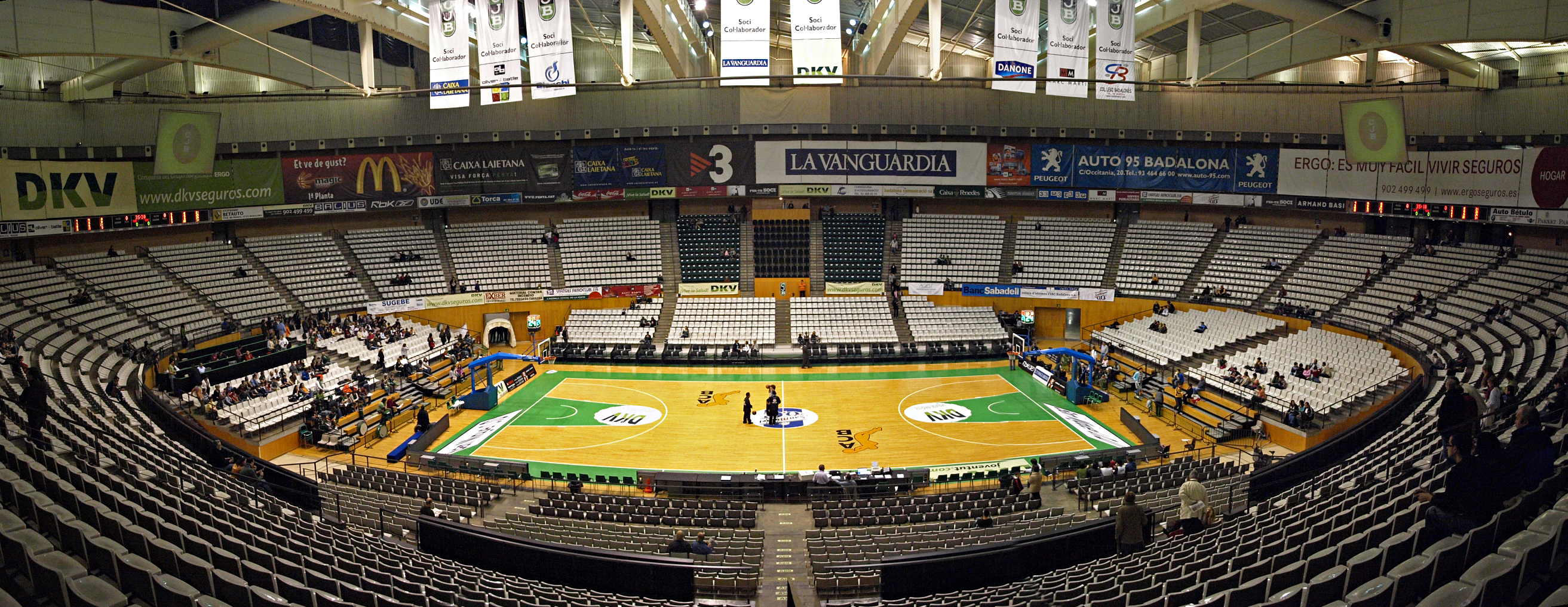
Pavelló Olímpic de Badalona

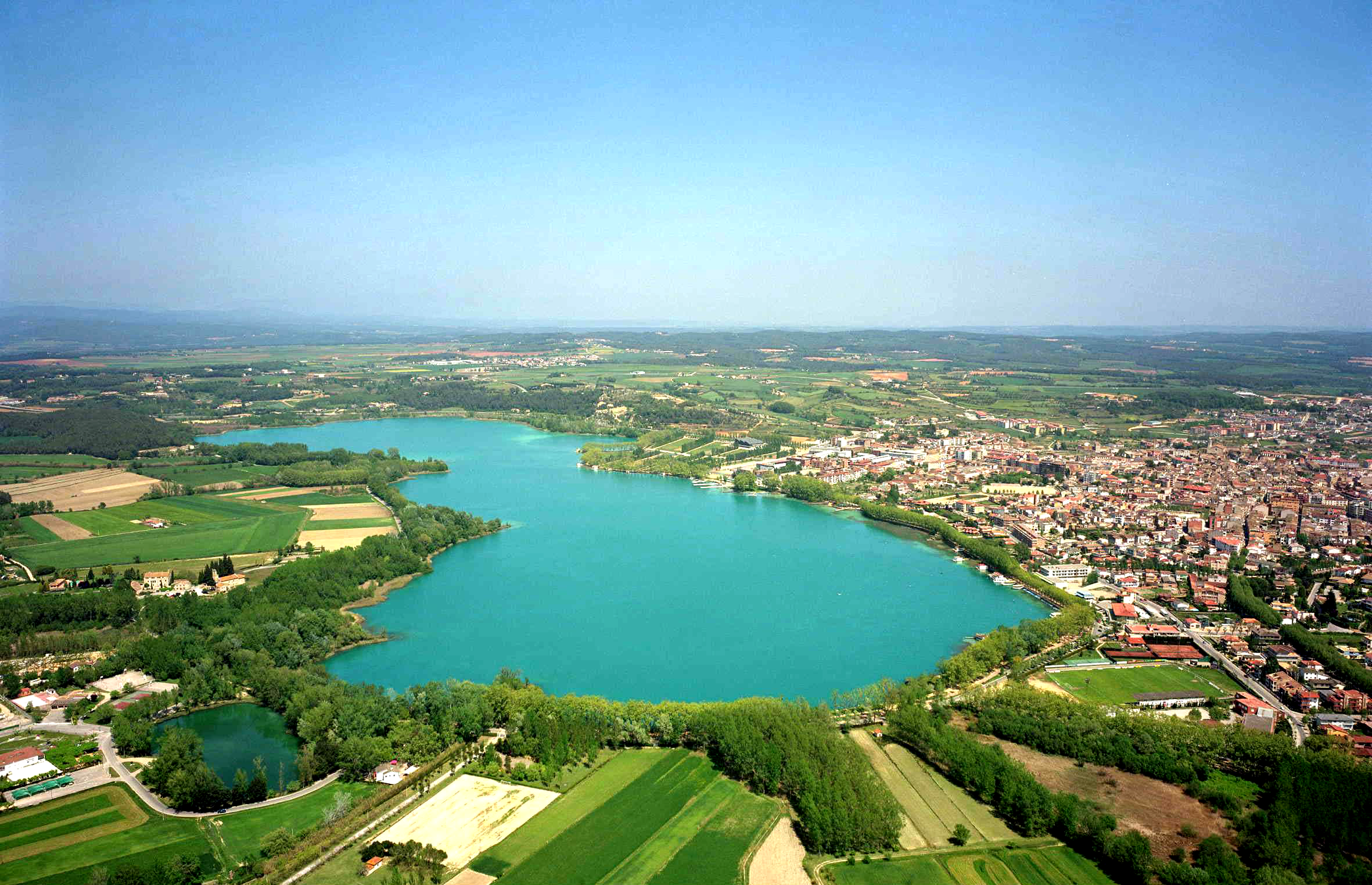
Banyoles lake

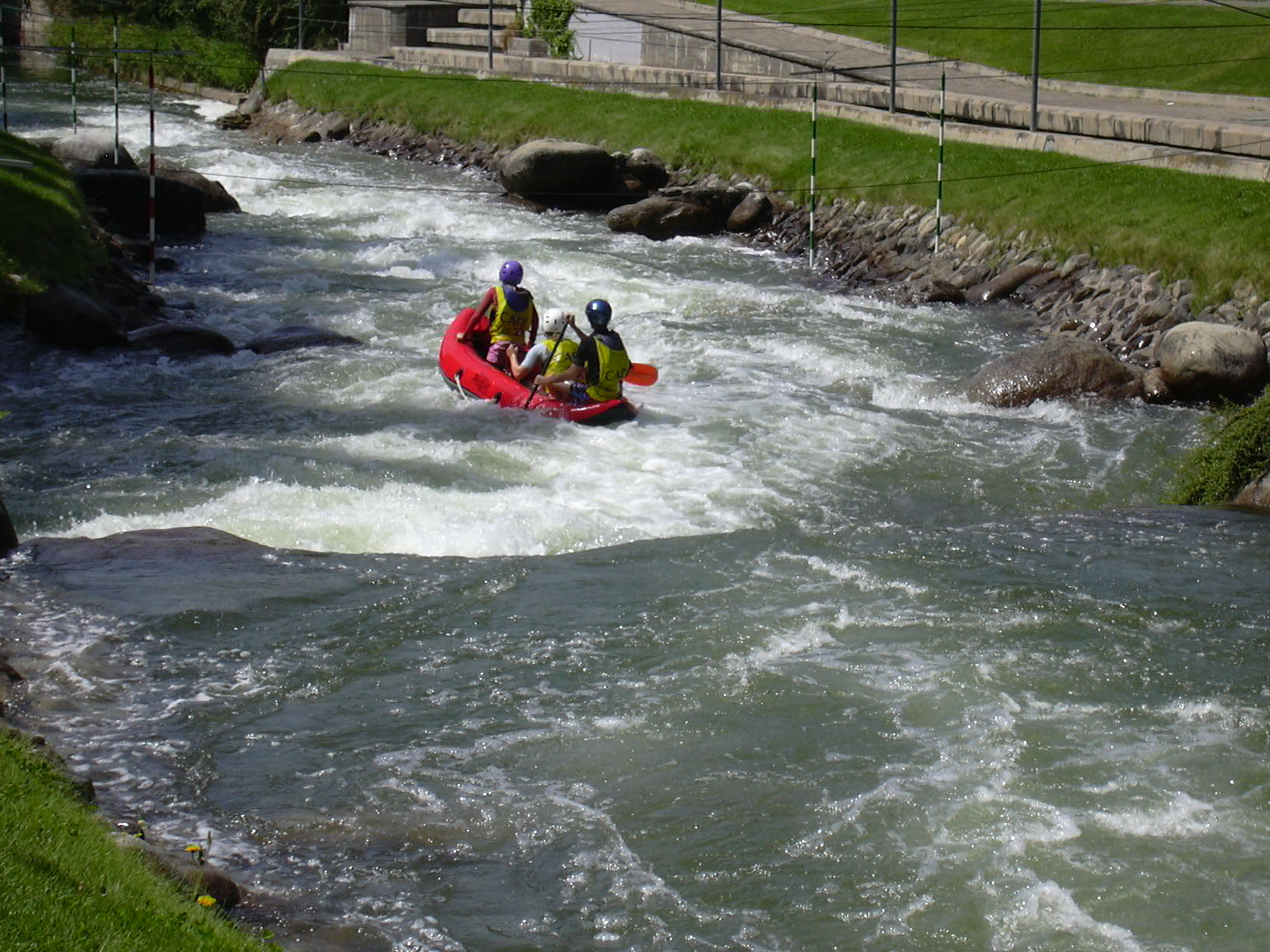
Parc del Segre

Catalonia has several of the best sports facilities in the world:

Facility	Main sports	City
Camp Nou	Football	Barcelona
Estadi Olímpic Lluís Companys	Football – Athletics	Barcelona
Estadi Cornellà-El Prat	Football	Cornellà de Llobregat/El Prat de Llobregat
Palau Sant Jordi	Basketball – Gymnastics	Barcelona
Palau Blaugrana	Basketball – Handball – Roller hockey	Barcelona
Velòdrom d'Horta	Track cycling	Barcelona
Port Olímpic de Barcelona	Sailing	Barcelona
Piscina Municipal de Montjuïc	Swimming – Water polo	Barcelona
Piscines Bernat Picornell	Swimming – Water polo	Barcelona
Tennis de la Vall d'Hebron	Tennis	Barcelona
Facilities of RCT Barcelona	Tennis	Barcelona
Facilities of RC Polo Barcelona	Equestrianism	Barcelona
Palau de Gel	Ice hockey	Barcelona
Camp Olímpic de Tir amb Arc	Archery	Barcelona
Camp de Beisbol Pérez de Rozas	Baseball	Barcelona
Pavelló Olímpic de Badalona	Basketball	Badalona
Palau D'Esports de Granollers	Handball	Granollers
Estadi Olímpic de Terrassa	Field hockey	Terrassa
Circuit de Catalunya	Motorcycle sport – Auto racing	Montmeló
Circuit d'Alcarràs	Motorcycle sport	Alcarràs
Canal Olímpic de Catalunya	Canoeing	Castelldefels
Parc Olímpic del Segre	Canoeing	La Seu d'Urgell
Estany de Banyoles	Rowing	Banyoles
Camp de Tir Olímpic de Mollet	Shooting sports	Mollet del Vallès
Club Hípic El Montanyà	Equestrianism	Seva
La Molina	Skiing	Alp
