= David Barrufet =

Spanish handball player (born 1970)

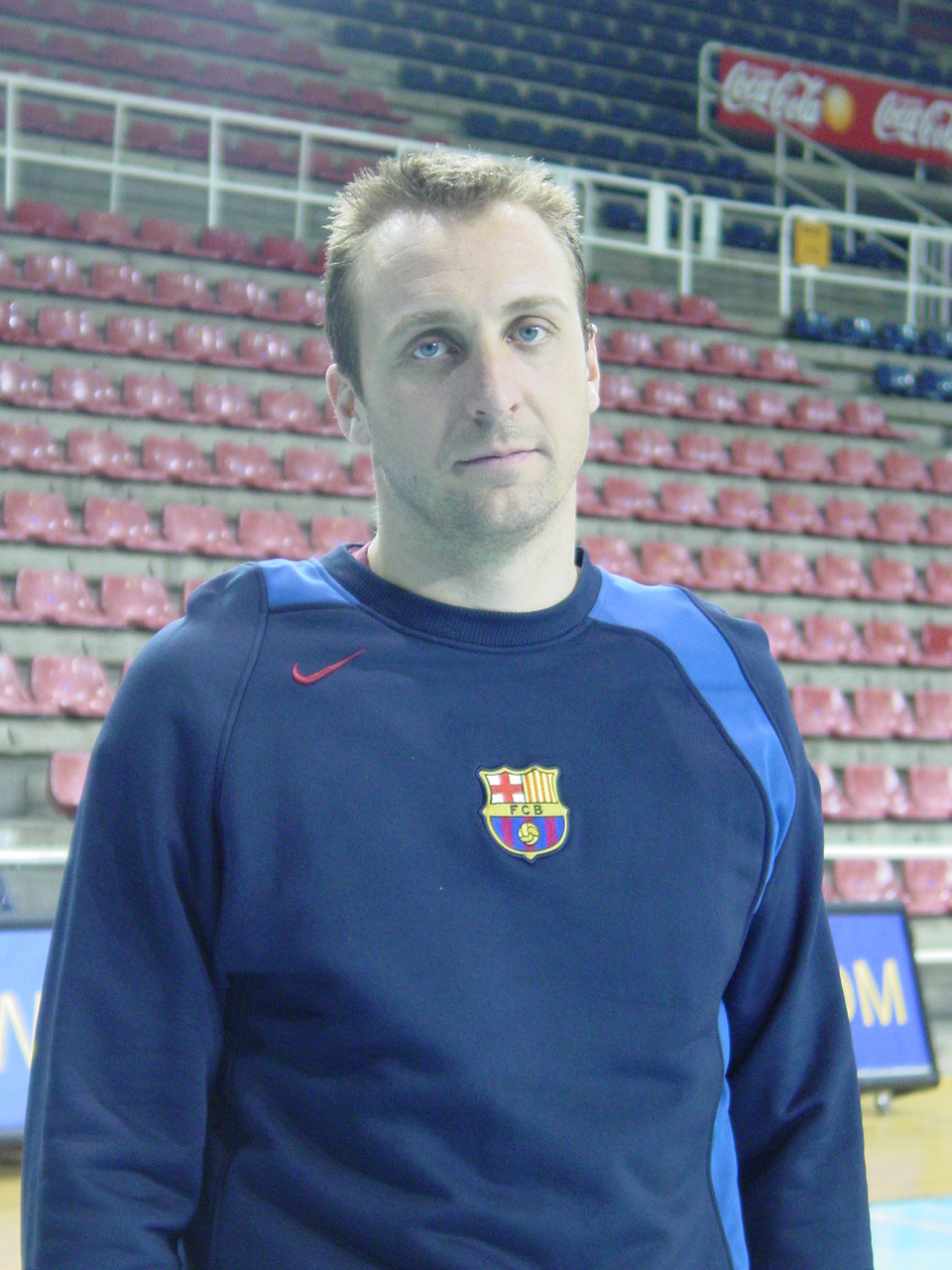
- Barrufet, FC Barcelona keeper

Personal information
- Full name: David Barrufet Bofill
- Born: 4 June 1970 (age 56) Barcelona, Spain
- Height: 1.99 m (6 ft 6 in)

Sport
- Sport: Handball
- Position: Goalkeeper
- Current club: Retired
- Number: 22

Youth career
- Years: Team
- 1978-1984: SAFA
- 1984-1988: FC Barcelona

Senior clubs
- Years: Team
- 1988-2010: FC Barcelona
National team
Years	Team	Apps	(Gls)
1990-2009	Spain	280	(2)

Teams managed
- 2015-2021: FC Barcelona
- 2021-: Spain
- 2022-: CS Dinamo București sporting director
Medal record
Olympic Games
Bronze medal – third place	2000 Sydney	National team
Bronze medal – third place	2008 Beijing	National team
World Championships
Gold medal – first place	2005 Tunisia	National team
European Championships
Silver medal – second place	1996 Spain	National team
Silver medal – second place	1998 Italy	National team
Silver medal – second place	2006 Switzerland	National team
Bronze medal – third place	2000 Croatia	National team
Mediterranean Games
Gold medal – first place	2005 Almería	National team

David Barrufet Bofill (Note: In this Spanish name, the first or paternal surname is Barrufet and the second or maternal family name is Bofill.) (born 4 June 1970 in Barcelona, Spain) is a former Spanish handball goalkeeper and current handball coach. Until 2021 he had the record for most matches for the Spanish national team until he was overtaken by Alberto Entrerríos. He played his entire career for FC Barcelona.

He is considered one of the best goalkeepers of all time. In 2000-2001 and 2001-2002 seasons was elected by International Handball Federation as the best goalkeeper in the world, and in 2001 he came second World best player voting.

== Career ==
He began playing handball in SAFA Horta school in Barcelona at 8 years old. Six years later, he went to FC Barcelona for playing in younger categories till 1988, when he played with the professional team.

On 8 February 2010, Barrufet announced his retirement from handball at the end of the 2009-10 season and F.C. Barcelona decided to retire the shirt number 16 on his honor. He won more than 70 titles with the club. He originally retired from the national team after the 2008 Olympics, but reconsidered on the suggestion from Valero Rivera.

== Coaching career ==
From October 2015 to the end of the 2020/21 season Barrufet was manager at FC Barcelona.

In September 2021 he became a part of the staff around the Spanish national team.

In February 2022 he took over as the sporting director of the Romanian side CS Dinamo București.

== Private life ==
His son Ian Barrufet is also a handball player, playing as a wing.

== Trophies ==
- 7 European Cups (1990–1991, 1995–1996, 1996–1997, 1997–1998, 1998–1999, 1999–2000 and 2004–2005)
- 2 European Cup Winners' Cups (1993–1994 and 1994–1995)
- 1 EHF Cup (2002–2003)
- 5 European Super Cups (1996–1997, 1997–1998, 1998–1999, 1999–2000 and 2003–2004)
- 11 Liga ASOBAL (1988–1989, 1989–1990, 1990–1991, 1991–1992, 1995–1996, 1996–1997, 1997–1998, 1998–1999, 1999–2000, 2002–2003 and 2005–2006)
- 8 King's Cups (1989–1990, 1992–1993, 1993–1994, 1996–1997, 1997–1998, 1999–2000, 2003–2004 and 2006–2007)
- 11 Spanish Supercups (1988–1989, 1989–1990, 1990–1991, 1991–1992, 1993–1994, 1996–1997, 1997–1998, 1999–2000, 2000–2001, 2003–2004 and 2006–2007)
- 6 ASOBAL Cups (1994–1995, 1995–1996, 1999–2000, 2000–2001, 2001–2002 and 2009–2010)
- 8 Pirenees Leagues (1997–1998, 1998–1999, 1999–2000, 2000–2001, 2001–2002, 2003–2004, 2005–2006 and 2006–2007)
- 6 Catalan leagues (1990–1991, 1991–1992, 1992–1993, 1993–1994, 1994–1995 and 1996–1997)
- World Championship (Tunisia 2005)
- Bronze medal in the Olympic Games (Sydney 2000)
- Bronze medal in the Olympic Games (Beijing 2008)
- Silver medal in the European Championship (Spain 1996)
- Silver medal in the European Championship (Italy 1998)
- Silver medal in the European Championship (Switzerland 2006)
- Bronze medal in the European Championship (Croatia 2000).
