= Enric Masip =

Spanish handball player (born 1969)

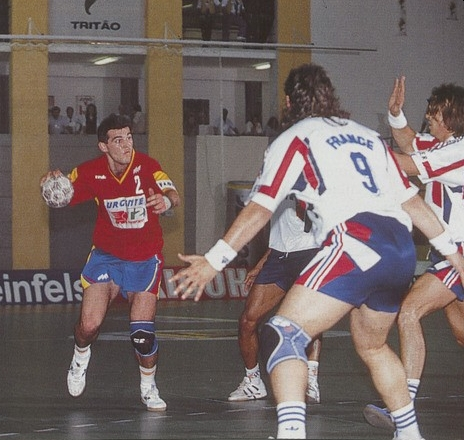

Personal information
- Full name: Enric Masip Borrás
- Nationality: Spanish
- Born: September 1, 1969 (age 57) Barcelona, Spain

Sport
- Sport: Handball
- Position: Playmaker

Senior clubs
- Years: Team
- 1987-1990: BM Granollers
- 1990-2004: FC Barcelona Handbol
National team
Years	Team	Apps	(Gls)
–	Spain	205	(656)

Enric Masip Borrás (Note: In this Spanish name, the first or paternal surname is Masip and the second or maternal family name is Borrás.) (born September 1, 1969 in Barcelona) is a retired Spanish handball player. He is considered one of the best Spanish handball players ever.

Formed in the younger categories of BM Granollers, in 1987 begun to play with the first team. After his good matches, in 1990 joined the FC Barcelona, winning 6 European Cups and 7 Leagues.

As a member of the Spanish national handball team, he participated in two Summer Olympics, six World Championships and three European Championships, serving as team captain in 2003. After some years with a lot of back injuries, he retired in 2004.

== Teams playing ==
- BM Granollers 1987-1990
- FC Barcelona Handbol 1990-2004

== Honours ==
National team

- Bronze medal in the Olympic Games Sydney 2000
- Silver medal in the European Championship Spain 1996
- Bronze medal in the European Championship Croatia 2000
- Silver medal in the Junior World Championship in Spain 1989

FC Barcelona

- European Cup: 6 (1990–91, 1995–96, 1996–97, 1997–98, 1998–99, 1999–00)
- European Cup Winners' Cup: 2 (1993–94, 1994–95)
- European Super Cup: 4 (1996–97, 1997–98, 1998–99, 1999-00)
- Liga ASOBAL: 7 (1990–91, 1991–92, 1995–96, 1996–97, 1997–98, 1998–99, 1999–00)
- King's Cup: 5 (1992–93, 1993–94, 1996–97, 1997–98, 1999–00)
- ASOBAL Cup: 5 (1994–95, 1995–96, 1999–00, 2000–01, 2001–02)
- Spanish Supercup: 5 (1990–91, 1991–92, 1993–94, 1996–97, 1997–98)
- Catalan league: 8 (1987–88, 1988–89, 1990–91, 1991–92, 1992–93, 1993–94, 1994–95, 1996–97)
- Pirenees League: 5 (1997, 1998, 1999, 2000, 2001)
