= CIRH =

CIRH may refer to:

- International Rink Hockey Committee
- CIRH-FM, a radio station in Vancouver, British Columbia, Canada
