= International Rink Hockey Committee =

German rink hockey governing body

International Rink Hockey Committee (CIRH)
- Formation: 1976
- Type: Federation of national associations
- Headquarters: Heroldstatt, Germany
- Official language: English
- Leader: Harro Strucksberg
- Vice President: Francesco Rossi
- Website: www.CIRH.net

The International Rink Hockey Committee or Comité Internationale de Rink-Hockey or CIRH was a sports governing body within the Fédération Internationale de Roller Sports designed to organize rules and competitions for the sport rink hockey.

== Events ==
- Men's Roller Hockey World Cup
- Women's Roller Hockey World Cup
- Roller Hockey World Cup U-20
- Intercontinental Cup
- Nations Cup
- Golden Cup
- Roller hockey at the World Games
- Roller hockey at the 1992 Summer Olympics

== See also ==
- World Skate Europe Rink Hockey
