= 2004 Rink Hockey Men's B World Championship =

2012 2004 FIRS B-World Cup
Tournament details
- Host country: Macao
- Dates: 24 November-1 December
- Teams: 11 (from 4 confederations)
- Venue: (in Macao host cities)

Final positions
- Champions: Catalonia
- Runners-up: England
- Third place: Andorra

Tournament statistics
- Matches played: 39
- Goals scored: 461 (11.82 per match)

The 2004 Rink Hockey Men's B World Championship was the 36th edition of the Rink Hockey B World Championship, held from October 16 to 23, in Macau.

The champion was Catalonia, that had obtained a FIRS provisional membership few months before the tournament. However, FIRS did not endorse final acceptance of Catalonia for subsequent editions, being a sporting scandal known as the Fresno Case.

== Format ==
Competition's schedule included 11 countries, divided in two groups, but North Korea withdrew a few days before the opening.

== Matches ==
All times are Macau local time (UTC+8).

=== Group stage ===
==== Group A ====
Team	Pld	W	D	L	GF	GA	GD	Pts
Macau	4	4	0	0	54	11	+43	12
Andorra	4	3	0	1	56	9	+47	9
New Zealand	4	2	0	2	32	28	+4	6
Chinese Taipei	4	1	0	3	18	48	−30	3
China	4	0	0	4	10	74	−64	0

16 October 2004
19:30

Macau	25 – 4	China

Macau Forum

16 October 2004
22:15

Andorra	19 – 0	Chinese Taipei

Macau Forum

17 October 2004
17:30

New Zealand	3 – 8	Andorra

Macau Forum

17 October 2004
18:45

Chinese Taipei	3 – 14	Macau

Macau Forum

18 October 2004
08:00

China	2 – 15	New Zealand

Macau Forum

18 October 2004
10:30

Andorra	3 – 4	Macau

Macau Forum

18 October 2004
15:30

New Zealand	13 – 7	Chinese Taipei

Macau Forum

18 October 2004
20:00

China	2 – 26	Andorra

Macau Forum

19 October 2004
09:15

Chinese Taipei	8 – 2	China

Macau Forum

19 October 2004
18:30

Macau	11 – 1	New Zealand

Macau Forum

==== Group B ====
Team	Pld	W	D	L	GF	GA	GD	Pts
Catalonia	5	5	0	0	52	0	+52	15
England	5	4	0	1	35	16	+19	12
Australia	5	2	1	2	23	25	−2	7
Austria	5	2	1	2	16	19	−3	7
Japan	5	1	0	4	14	30	−16	3
North Korea	5	0	0	5	0	50	−50	0 (Note: North Korea lost all their matches 0-10 after withdrawing competition.)

Notes:
16 October 2004
21:00

Austràlia (Australia)	0 – 11	Catalonia

Macau Forum

17 October 2004
09:15

England	14 – 0	Japan

Macau Forum

17 October 2004
10:30

Austria	10 – 0 *	North Korea

Macau Forum

17 October 2004
20:00

North Korea	0 – 10 *	England

Macau Forum

17 October 2004
20:05

Catalonia	12 – 0	Austria

Macau Forum

17 October 2004
21:45

Japan	4 – 6	Australia

Macau Forum

18 October 2004
11:45

Australia	10 – 0 *	North Korea

Macau Forum

18 October 2004
18:45

Catalonia	8 – 0	Japan

Macau Forum

18 October 2004
21:15

England	4 – 1	Austria

Macau Forum

19 October 2004
08:00

Japan	10 – 0 *	North Korea

Macau Forum

19 October 2004
10:30

Austria	3 – 3	Australia

Macau Forum

19 October 2004
11:45

England	0 – 11	Catalonia

Macau Forum

19 October 2004
19:45

Austria	2 – 0	Japan

Macau Forum

19 October 2004
21:00

Australia	4 – 7	England

Macau Forum

19 October 2004
22:15

Catalonia	10 – 0 *	North Korea

Macau Forum

=== 9th and 10th places ===
21 October 2004

China	0 – 16	Japan

Macau Forum

21 October 2004

Japan	11 – 1	China

Macau Forum

=== 5th place bracket ===
Semi-finals
October 22 – Macau
New Zealand	6
Austria	7
October 22 – Macau
Australia	8
Chinese Taipei	2

Fifth place
October 23 – Macau
Australia	5
Austria	4
Seventh place
October 23 – Macau
New Zealand	2
Chinese Taipei	0

=== Championship Knockout stage ===
Quarter-finals
October 21 – Macau
New Zealand	4
England	18
October 21 – Macau
Macau	6
Austria	3
October 21 – Macau
Andorra	4
Australia	2
October 21 – Macau
Chinese Taipei	1
Catalonia	12

Semi-finals
October 22 – Macau
England	9
Macau	4
October 22 – Macau
Andorra	0
Catalonia	8

Final
October 23 – Macau
England	0
Catalonia	6
Third place
October 23 – Macau
Andorra	2
Macau	0

2004 Rink Hockey Men's
B World champions

== Final standings ==
Place	Team
1	Catalonia
2	England
3	Andorra
4	Macau
5	Australia
6	Austria
7	New Zealand
8	Chinese Taipei
9	Japan
10	China
11	North Korea
