= Catalonia women's national roller hockey team =

- Association: Catalonia Roller Sports Federation
- Confederation: (CSP)
- Head coach: Josep Maria Barberà

Ranking
- Ranking: unranked

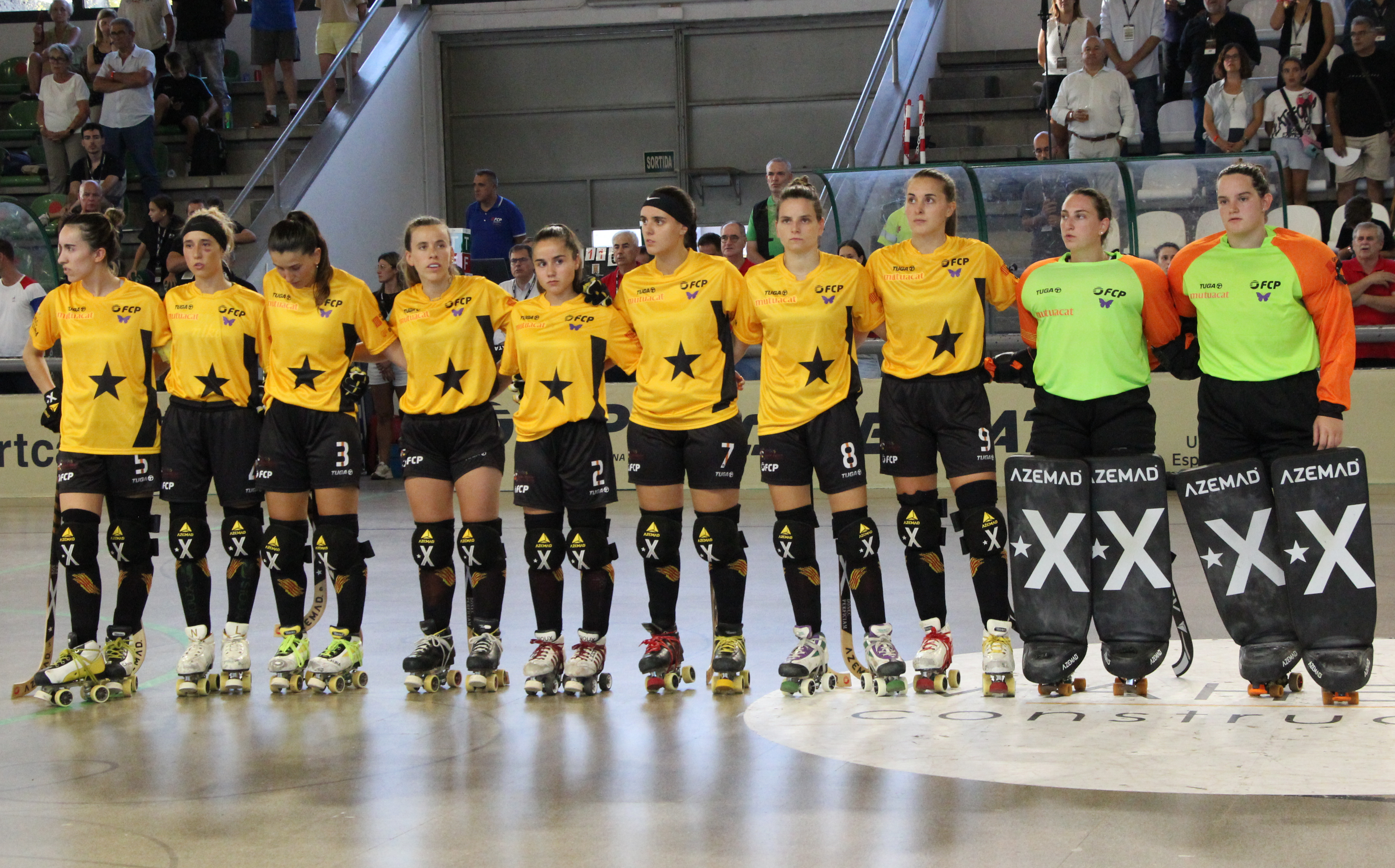

The Catalonia women's national roller hockey team is the national team side of Catalonia at international roller hockey. Nowadays it's not officially recognized by International Roller Sports Federation (FIRS).

In 2004 was admitted by FIRS, but this decision was revoked in November 2004 (Fresno Case) and again in November 2005, after the Court of Arbitration for Sport forced the FIRS to repeat the vote following the FIRS statute rules.

In November 2006 was admitted by Confederación Sudamericana del Patín and now plays the CSP Copa America.

Also competes in the Golden Cup, held in Blanes (Catalonia) every year since 2006.

== Catalonia squad - 2010 Copa America ==
Goaltenders
#	Player	Hometown	Club
	Caterina Ortega		CP Vilanova
	Laia Vives		CP Voltregà
Field Players
#	Player	Hometown	Club
	Berta Tarrida		CP Vilanova
	Anna Casaramona		CP Voltregà
	Anna Romero		CP Voltregà
	Carla Giudicci		CP Voltregà
	Marta Monpart		CP Voltregà
	Cristina Barceló		CP Voltregà
	Paula Torner		HC Sant Cugat
	Maria Díez		Igualada HC

Team Staff

- General Manager:
- Mechanic:

Coaching Staff

- Head Coach: Josep Maria Barberà
- Assistant:

== Titles ==
- Golden Cup - 2006, 2007, 2009 (3)

== See also ==
- Catalonia national roller hockey team (men's)
