= Catalonia men's national roller hockey team =

- Association: Catalonia Roller Sports Federation
- Confederation: (CSP)
- Head coach: Jordi Camps

Ranking
- Ranking: unranked

First international
- Australia 0–11 Catalonia (Macau, China; 16 October 2004)

Biggest win
- United States 0–13 Catalonia (Recife, Brazil; 31 October 2007)

Biggest defeat
- Catalonia 2–4 Argentina (Recife, Brazil; 3 November 2007)

The Catalonia men's national roller hockey team is the national team of Catalonia in international roller hockey. Nowadays it's not officially recognized by International Roller Sports Federation (FIRS).

== History ==
In 2004 Catalonia was admitted to membership of FIRS, but this decision was revoked in November 2004 (Fresno Case) and again in November 2005, after the Court of Arbitration for Sport forced the FIRS to repeat the vote following the FIRS statute rules. Spanish officials were reported as having brought pressure to bear on a number of countries to reverse the previous vote. While it was an official member, Catalonia won the 2004 Rink Hockey Men's B World Championship.

In November 2006 Catalonia was admitted by Confederación Sudamericana del Patín and now plays the CSP Copa America, which it won in 2010.

!Catalonia also competes in the Golden Cup, which has been held in Blanes (Catalonia) every year since 2004.

== Catalonia squad - 2011 Blanes Golden Cup ==
Goaltenders
#	Player	Hometown	Club
	Guillem Trabal		Reus Deportiu
	Xavier Malian		HC Liceo La Coruña
Field Players
#	Player	Hometown	Club
	Ferran Formatger		Igualada HC
	Roger Rocasalbas		CP Vilanova
	Daniel Rodríguez		Blanes Hoquei Club
	Cristinan Rodríguez		CE Vendrell
	Jordi Ferrer		CP Vilanova
	Marc Gual		Reus Deportiu
	Raül Marín		Reus Deportiu

Team Staff

- General Manager:
- Mechanic:

Coaching Staff

- Head Coach: Jordi Camps
- Assistant:

== Titles ==
- FIRS Roller Hockey World Cup "B" - 2004 (1)
- Copa America - 2010 (1)
- Golden Cup - 2004, 2005, 2008, 2009, 2010, 2011 (6)

== See also ==
- Catalonia women's national roller hockey team
