= Mediterranean Challenge Cup =

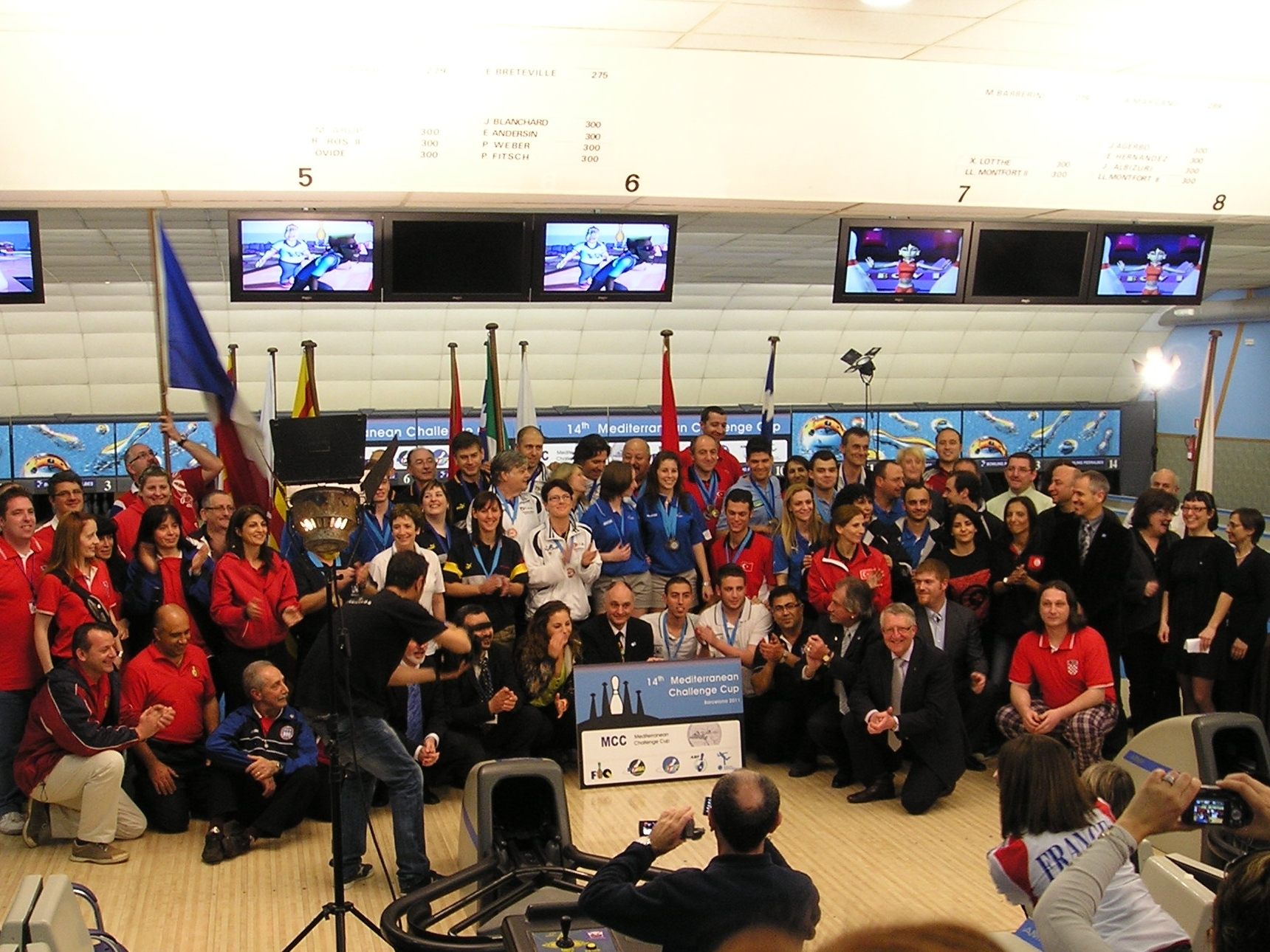
2011 Mediterranean Challenge Cup

The Mediterranean Challenge Cup, now known as the Mediterranean Bowling Championships, is a ten-pin bowling competition for the federations with coastline to the Mediterranean Sea. San Marino, Portugal, Kosovo, and Serbia have all participated in the MBC that don't have coastline to the Mediterranean Sea but are members of the Mediterranean Bowling Confederation. It is recognized by the European Tenpin Bowling Federation, with the first edition conducted in 1998. Each eligible federation sends two men and two women to compete for medals in Singles, Doubles, Mixed Doubles (added in 2012), Teams, All-Events and Masters (added in 2007) for a total of 10 medal events.

== History ==
=== I MCC - Nicosia 1998 ===
The first Mediterranean Challenge Cup (MCC) was held in Nicosia, Cyprus in 1998 with players from Greece, Israel, Malta and Cyprus. Tasoulla Hadjiloizou (Cyprus) and Dimitrios Karetsos (Greece) won the singles events. Sue Abela-Melissa Anastasi (Malta) won women's doubles and Dimitrios Karetsos-Manolis Michalenas (Greece) won men's doubles. Greece won the teams event. Abela and Karetsos topped the "all-events" standings.

=== II MCC - St. Julian's 1999 ===
The second MCC was held in St. Julian's, Malta and included a new team, Turkey. Lisa Shalom (Israel) and Christos Kourtellides (Cyprus) won the singles events. Christina Fotinia-Aleka Zorba (Greece) won women's doubles and Steve Calleja-Danial Swift won men's doubles. Malta won the teams event and also swept the "all-events" gold medals, with Sue Abela winning the women's "all-events" for the second year in a row and Calleja winning the men's "all-events".

=== III MCC - Athens 2000 ===
Athens, Greece hosted the third MCC with a new team from the western shore of the Mediterranean Sea, Spain. Sue Abela (Malta) and Dimitrios Karetsos (Greece) won the singles events. The doubles event winners were Sue Abela-Melissa Anastasi (Malta) and Dimitrios Karetsos-Leonidas Maragos (Greece). Israel won the team event. Abela and Karetsos won the "all-events" gold medal, as they both did in 1998. Abela has won three consecutive women's "all-events" gold medals.

=== IV MCC - Nicosia 2001 ===
The fourth MCC was held in Nicosia, Cyprus for the second time, and one of the teams withdrew, Turkey. Greece swept the singles events, Esmeralda Kaltsou winning women's singles and Dimitrios Karetsos winning men's singles for the third time in four years. Ida Pardo-Sarit Mizrahi (Israel) won women's doubles and Dimitrios Karetsos-Alex Tzounis (Greece) won men's doubles. Karetsos has won three men's doubles gold medals in four years with three different partners. Israel won the teams event for the second year in a row. Greece swept the "all-events" gold medals, with singles event winners Kaltsou and Karetsos prevailing. Karetsos has won three of the four men's "all-events" gold medals.

=== V MCC - Barcelona 2002 ===
In fifth MCC was held in Barcelona, (Catalonia), increasing the number of teams to seven with the return of Turkey and the first participation of France. It was played from April 12 to 13 in the Bowling Pedralbes. Sue Abela (Malta) and Bertrand Pujol (France) won both singles and "all-events". Abela has won four of the five "all-events" gold medals. Alexandra Combes-Karen Jost (France) won the women's doubles event and Leonidas Maragos-Dimitris Karetsos (Greece) winning men's doubles for the second time, having won in 2000. Karetsos has been a part of four winning doubles teams for Greece. Greece won the team event. France ended up winning the most medals in the 2002 MCC in their first participation, 3 golds, 2 silver, 2 bronze.

=== VI MCC - Istanbul 2003 ===
The sixth MCC was held in the Korukent Cosmic Bowling of Istanbul, Turkey. Greece and France withdrew, while Italy participated in its first MCC. Pnina Raskin (Israel) and Habib Dogan (Turkey) won the singles events. Sue Abela-Doris Camilleri (Malta) won women's doubles and Marcial Ovide-Lluis Montfort (Spain) won men's doubles. Spain won the teams event. Abela and Montfort won the "all-events" gold medals. Abela has won five of the six "all-events" gold medals. Italy in its first participation won two silver medals and a bronze medal.

=== VII MCC - Rome 2004 ===
The seventh MCC was held in Rome, Italy. Gibraltar and San Marino joined the competition and Greece returned. Sue Abela (Malta) and Moises Perez (Spain) won the singles events. Sue Abela-Melissa Anastasi (Malta) won women's doubles for the third time, having previously won in 1998 and 2000. Men's doubles were Loris Masetti-Marco Reviglio (Italy). Italy won the teams events. Abela and Marcial Ovide (Spain) won the "all-events" gold medals. Abela has won six of seven women's "all-events" gold medals.

=== VIII MCC - St. Julian's 2005 ===
The eighth MCC was held in St. Julian's, Malta for the second time at Eden Superbowl, with Turkey withdrawing. Anastasia Rovithaki (Greece) and Marcial Ovide (Spain) won the singles events. Anastasia Rovithaki-Despina Chrisanthi (Greece) won women's doubles and Yaniv Gresario-Yahav Rabin (Israel) won men's doubles. Malta won the teams event. Abela and Ovide won the "all-events" gold medals, just as both did last year. Abela has won seven of the eight women's "all-events" gold medals and four in a row.

=== IX MCC - Serravalle 2006 ===
The ninth MCC was held in Serravalle, San Marino at Rose'n'Bowl. Turkey returned, Morocco joined the Cup and Spain withdrew. Sue Abela (Malta) and Domenica Maddaloni (Italy) won the singles events. Abela has now won four singles gold medals. Sue Abela-Lorraine Casha (Malta) won women's doubles and Tener-Johnatan Geller (Israel) won men's doubles. Greece won the teams event. Abela and Pachoulis Vretos (Greece) won the "all-events". Abela has won five consecutive women's "all-events" gold medals and eight of nine overall. San Marino won its first medal in the MCC, when Nico Gasperoni won a bronze in the singles event.

=== X MCC - Mersin 2007 ===
The tenth MCC was held in Mersin, Turkey from March 27 to April 3 at Rollhouse Bowling Center of Mersin. Eleven teams participated with the return of France and Spain. A Masters event was introduced, which consisted of the top 8 in the All-Events standings for men and women playing three rounds of best-of-three single eliminations. Chiara Roiati (Italy) and Mark Spiteri (Malta) emerged as winners of the masters event. Natassa Rovithaki (Greece) and Nunzio Romano (Italy) won the singles events. Nofar Hershkovich-Mor Aviramtwo (Israel) won women's doubles and Xavier Lotthe-Emmanuel Michaud (France) won men's doubles. Italy won the teams event. The All-Event gold medalists were Rovithaki and Michaud.

=== XI MCC - Chania 2008 ===
The eleventh MCC was held in Chania, Greece at Bowling Mega Palace. Nine teams participated while Israel and Morocco withdrawing. Sue Abela (Malta) and Sebastien Henry won the singles events. Abela has won five singles gold medals. Elise Brenteville-Marie Gauton (France) won women's doubles and Marco Reviglio-Maurizio Celli (Italy) won men's doubles. Abela and Melvin Ocando (Spain) won the All-Events gold medals. Abela has now won nine All-Events gold medals. Turkey won the teams event. Gauton and Ocando won the masters event.

=== XII MCC - Montpellier 2009 ===
The twelfth MCC was held in Montpellier, France from April 23–25 at Bowling de Montpellier. Ten teams participated with Spain withdrawing and the inclusion of Catalonia and the return of Israel. The winners of the singles events were Ioannis Stathatos (Greece) and Sue Abela (Malta). Abela now has six singles gold medals. Natassa Rovithaki-Georgia Papadimitriou (Greece) won women's doubles and Daniele Fiorentini-Frederico Rossi (Italy) won men's doubles. France won the teams event. Liat Vizenfeld (Israel) and Lluís Montfort (Catalonia) won the All-Events gold medals. Abela and Montfort won the masters events.

=== XIII MCC - Paphos 2010 ===
In 2010 the MCC was held in Paphos, Cyprus from April 15–17. The teams were the same as 2009. Antonio Francesco (Italy) and Liat Vizenfeld (Israel) won the singles events. Antonio Francesco-Marco Reviglio (Italy) and Niki Schiza-Myria Kastori (Cyprus) won the doubles event. Cyprus won the teams event. The All-Events gold medals went to Marco Reviglio (Italy) and Niki Schiza (Cyprus), and the Masters event were won by Or Aviram and Sarit Mizrahi, both from Israel.

=== XIV MCC - Barcelona 2011 ===
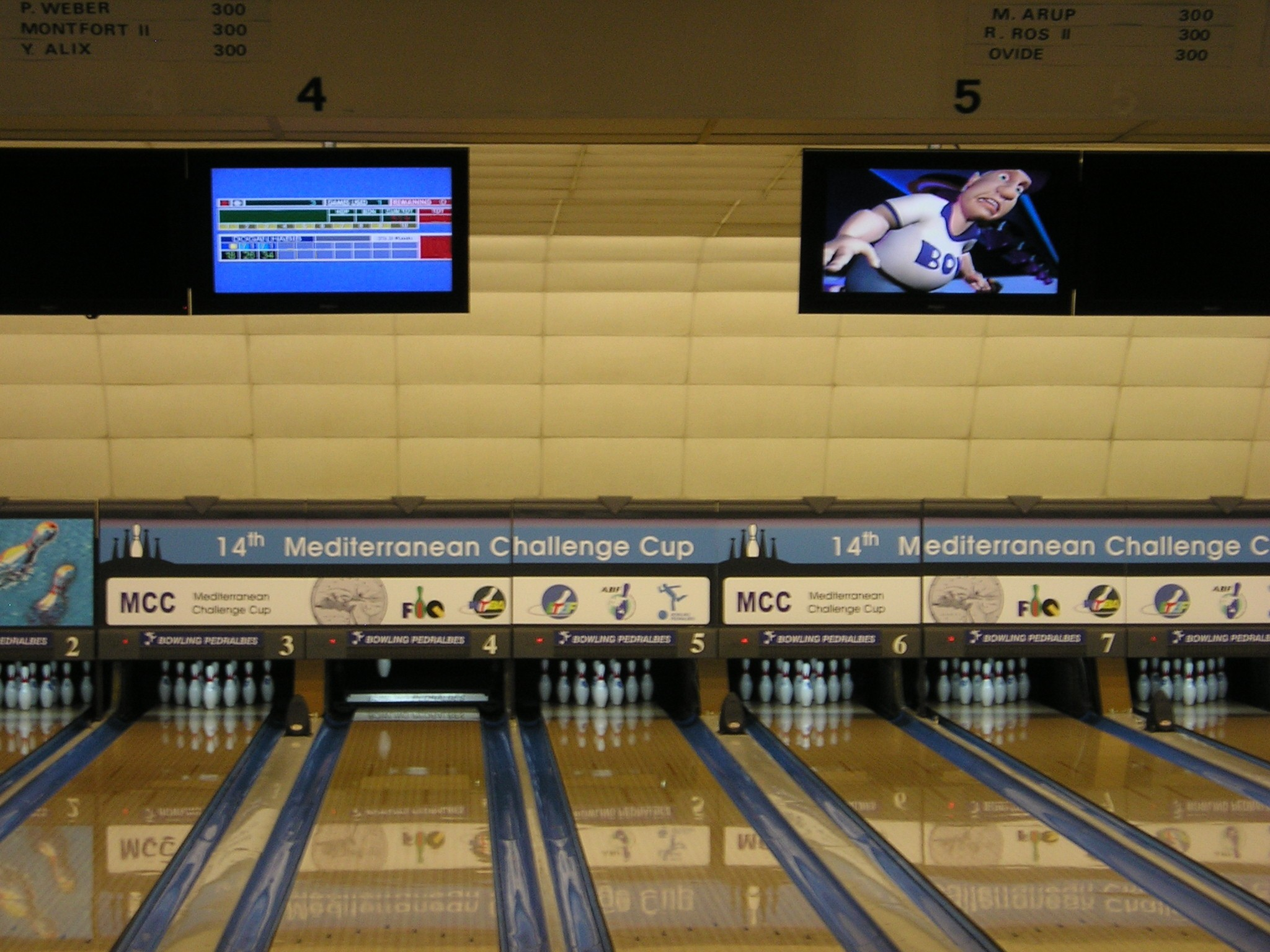
2011 Mediterranean Challenge Cup

In 2011 the MCC was held in Barcelona (Catalonia) for the second time, increasing the number of teams to 13 with the first participation of Croatia, Slovenia and Tunisia. It was played from March 30 to April 2 in the Bowling Pedralbes. Sue Abela (Malta) and Georgios Stefanidis (Greece) won the singles events. Abela has won seven singles gold medals. Sue Abela-Tiziana Carannante (Malta) and Georgios Stefanidis-Evangelos Krizinis (Greece) won the doubles events and France won the teams event. The "All Event" winners were Sue Abela (Malta) and Habib Dogan (Turkey). Abela has won ten All-Event gold medals. Masters champions were Niki Schiza (Cyprus) and Marco Reviglio (Italy).

=== XV MCC - Serravalle 2012 ===
In 2012 the MCC was held in Serravalle, San Marino for the second time (previously hosted in 2006) from April 17–21 at Rose'n Bowl with the same 13 teams as 2011. Sandra Torrents (Catalonia) and Maurizio Celli (Italy) won the singles events. The winners in the doubles event were Ebru Ozogluuntur-Adile Michajlow (Turkey) and George Stefanidis-Evangelos Krizinis (Greece), the Greek team winning for the second straight year. A new event, mixed doubles, was added to the schedule, with Daniela Buzzeli-Enzo Zucchinelli (Italy) emerging as winners. The teams event was won by Greece. The "All Event" winners were Sandra Torrents (Catalonia) and Evangelos Krizinis (Greece). The Masters champions were Sue Abela (Malta) and George Stefanidis (Greece).

=== XVI MCC - Ljubljana 2013 ===
In 2013 the MCC was held in Ljubljana, Slovenia for the first time from April 9–13 at Bowling Klub 300. 13 teams participated, with Spain returning and Catalonia withdrawing. The singles events were won by Helga Di Benedetto (Italy) and Justin Scicluna (Malta). The winners in the doubles event were Sue Abela-Tiziana Carannante (Malta) for the second time and Julien Sermand-Nicolas Marchand (France). Mixed doubles was won by Alexandra Zormpa-Ioannis Maroussis (Greece). Italy won the teams event. The "All Event" winners were Sue Abela (Malta) and Anže Grabrijan (Slovenia). Abela has won eleven All-Events gold medals. Anže Grabrijan's All-Events gold medal was the first ever for Slovenia in the MCC. Masters champions were Myria Kastori (Cyprus) and Tolga Sismanogullar (Turkey). Croatia won its first ever medal in the MCC when Mise Mrkonjic won a bronze in the men's masters event.

=== XVII MCC - Gibraltar 2014 ===
In 2014 the MCC was held in Gibraltar from April 2–5 at King’s Bastion Leisure Centre. 10 teams participated, with Catalonia returning, while Croatia, Spain, Tunisia and Turkey withdrew. The singles events were won by Sue Abela (Malta) and Lior Bar (Israel). The doubles winners were Lauriane Célié-Stéphanie Dubourg (France) and Anže Grabrijan-Nino Stenko (Slovenia). Mixed doubles winners were Stéphanie Dubourg-Rémy Laudy (France). Greece won the teams event. The "All Event" winners were Lauriane Célié (France) and George Stefanidis (Greece). Célié and Stefanidis also won the Masters event. Gibraltar won its first ever medal in the MCC, when Adam Shrubb won a bronze medal in the men's masters event.

=== XVIII MCC - Chania 2015 ===
In 2015 the MCC was held in Chania, Greece for the second time. It took place at Bowling Mega Placecenter from April 21–26. 12 federations participated, with Croatia, Spain, Tunisia, and Turkey returning. Catalonia and France withdrew. The singles events were won by Ivana Crajacic (Croatia) and Francisco Rodriguez (Spain). The doubles winners were Giada Dimartino-Annalisa Balzano (Italy) and Stavros Parasakis-Ioannis Stathatos (Greece). Mixed doubles winners were Adile Michajlow-Habib Dogan (Turkey). Malta won the teams event. The "All Event" winners were Sue Abela (Malta) and Francisco Rodriguez (Spain). Abela has won twelve All Events gold medals. Masters champions were Gulhan Aksular (Turkey) and Anže Grabrijan (Slovenia).

=== XVIV MBC - Bologna 2016 ===
The 2016 Mediterranean Bowling Championships (MBC) was held in Bologna, Italy at RenoBowling, Casalecchio di Reno from April 12–16. 13 federations participated, 12 federations that participated in 2015 and France returning after a one-year absence. The singles events were won by Lynne Fishler (Israel) and Vaggelis Krizinis (Greece). Italy swept both men's and women's doubles. Helga Di Benedetto-Melania Rossi winning the women's doubles and Maurizio Celli-Alessandro Spada winning the men's doubles. Mixed doubles winners were Georgia Sagona-Vaggelis Krizinis (Greece). France won the teams event. The "All Event" winners were Sue Abela (Malta) and Vaggelis Krizinis (Greece). Abela now has thirteen All Events gold medals. Masters champions were Adile Michajlow (Turkey) and Nino Stenko (Slovenia).

=== XX MBC - Ljubljana 2017 ===
The 2017 MBC was held March 26 to April 2, in Ljubljana, Slovenia for the second at Bowling Klub 300 (previously hosted in 2013). Just like the previous edition, the same 13 federations participated in the MBC. The singles events were won by Sue Abela (Malta), her 9th singles gold medal, and Valentin Saulnier (France). Sue Abela-Sara Xuereb of Malta won women's doubles, while Anže Grabrijan-Aleksander Koštric of host Slovenia won men's doubles. Abela won her fourteenth gold medal with her win in women's doubles. Valentin Saulnier-Alexandra Lopes of France won mixed doubles. France won the teams event. France also swept the "All Event" gold medals, Alexandra Lopes winning for the women and Valentin Saulnier winning for the men. Masters champions were Alexandria Lopes (France) and Anže Grabrijan (Slovenia).

=== XXI MBC - Ankara 2018 ===
The 21st MBC was held April 15–22 in Ankara, Turkey, at Rollhouse Bowling. 11 federations participated, with Gibraltar and Israel withdrawing. The singles events were won by Lauriane Célié (France) and Justin Caruana Scicluna (Malta). Elisa Primavera and Elga di Benedetto (Italy) won women's doubles, while Roros Stamatios and Vasileios Stefopoulos (Greece) won men's doubles. Martha Karatzoyla and Roros Stamatios (Greece) won mixed doubles. France won the team event for the third consecutive year. All event winners were Lauriane Célié (France) and Roros Stamatios (Greece). France swept the masters titles, with Amandine Jacques winning women's masters and Quentin Deroo winning the men's masters.

=== XXII MBC - St. Julian's 2019 ===
The 22nd MBC was held March 31 - April 7 in St. Julian's, Malta for the third time (previously hosted in 1999 and 2005) at Eden Superbowl. This was the biggest edition yet, attracting 16 federations. Egypt, Kosovo and Portugal participated for the first time, while Gibraltar and Israel returned after a one-year absence. The singles events were won by Georgia Sagona (Greece) and Antonino Fiorentino (Italy). Sara Xuereb and Sue Abela (Malta) won women's doubles, while Ege Gediz and Erkeskin Taygun (Turkey) won men's doubles. Abela's win in women's doubles was her fifteenth gold medal. Ebru Ozogluuntur and Taygun Erkeskin (Turkey) won mixed doubles. For the fourth consecutive year, France won the team event. The singles winners, Sagona and Fiorentino, won all events. Delphine Labille (France) won women's masters and Taygun Erkeskin (Turkey) won the men's masters.

=== XXIII MBC - Moussy-le-Neuf 2021 ===
The 23rd MBC was to be November 8–15, 2020, in Moussy-le-Neuf, France, at Escape Factory, but was postponed due to the COVID-19 pandemic and rescheduled to October 11–17, 2021. 14 Federations participated, with Egypt and Tunisia withdrawing. The singles events were won by Tali Itzhak Abdu (Israel) and Walter Alessandro Santu (Italy). Italy swept the doubles events, with Roberta Ferina & Melania Rossi winning women's doubles, while Walter Alessandro Santu & Tommaso Radi won men's doubles. Tali Itzhak Abdu & Netanel Shimon Volpert (Israel) won mixed doubles. For the fifth consecutive time, France won the team event. The singles winners, Abdu and Santu, won all-events. Georgia Sagona (Greece) won women's masters and Maxime Dubois (France) won men's masters. Portugal won its first ever medal in the MBC, when Paulo Lopes won a bronze medal in men's singles.

=== XXIV MBC - Athens 2022 ===
The 24th MBC was held in Athens, Greece for the second time from May 1–8, at Strike Bowling Centre. 15 federations participated, with Egypt and Tunisia returning after missing last year's edition, while Kosovo withdrawing. The singles events were won by Alja Bergauer (Slovenia) and Keny Billaut (France). Eva Krafogel and Alja Bergauer (Slovenia) won women's doubles, while Lefteris Montsenigos and Orestes Stamatiou (Greece) won men's doubles. Manon Grandsire and Hugo Bonnefoy (France) won mixed doubles. For the sixth consecutive time, France won the team event. The singles winners, Bergauer and Billaut won all-events. Grandsire won women's masters and Stamatiou won men's masters. Egypt won its first ever medal in the MBC when Sarah Farag won a silver medal in women's singles.

=== XXV MBC - Serraville 2023 ===
The 25th MBC was held May 7–13 in Serraville's Rosen Bowl Bowling Centre for the third time, having previously hosted in 2006 and 2012. 15 federations participated, with Kosovo returning after a one-year absence and Egypt withdrawing. For the seventh consecutive time, France won the team event and was also the most successful in the medal table, winning seven medals in total, four of which was gold. Malta's Sue Abela won her sixteenth gold medal when she won all events (total pinfall of singles, doubles, mixed, and team events). Kosovo won its first ever medal in the MBC when Osmani Albin won a bronze medal in men's singles.

=== XXVI MBC - Rome 2024 ===
The 26th MBC was held in Rome, Italy for the second time from April 21–27. 13 federations participated, with Serbia accepting an invite to participate for the first time, while Gibraltar, Israel, and Kosovo all withdrew. Greece and Slovenia each won seven medals total to lead the medal count.

=== XXVII MBC - Ankara 2025 ===
The 27th MBC was held at Rollhouse Bowling in Ankara, Turkey for the second time from April 27 to May 3. 9 federations competed, with Kosovo returning after a one-year absence, while Croatia, Greece, San Marino, Serbia, and Slovenia all withdrawing. Sue Abela won two more gold medals (women's doubles and team event) to bring her total to eighteen gold medals overall. Malta was the most successful federation, winning eight medals.

=== XXVIII MBC - Zaprešić 2026 ===
The 28th MBC was held at West Bowling Center in Zaprešić, Croatia for the first time from April 26 to May 3. 16 federations competed, with Croatia, Greece, San Marino, Serbia, and Slovenia all returning after a one-year absence. Gibraltar and Israel return after a two-year absence. Greece was the most successful federation, winning nine medals. Serbia won its first ever medal in the MBC when Stevan Lekić won bronze in men's singles.

=== XXIX MBC - Portugal 2027 ===
The 29th MBC will be held in Portugal for the first time from May 9–16.

== Medal history ==
Mediterranean Bowling Championships 1998–2026
Rank	Nation	Gold	Silver	Bronze	Total
1	Malta (MLT)	48	45	46	139
2	France (FRA)	45	29	32	106
3	Greece (GRE)	43	45	51	139
4	Italy (ITA)	28	34	41	103
5	Israel (ISR)	17	17	24	58
6	Slovenia (SLO)	15	18	15	48
7	Spain (ESP)	13	23	21	57
8	Cyprus (CYP)	13	8	16	37
9	Turkey (TUR)	12	18	19	49
10	Catalonia (CAT)	4	7	6	17
11	Croatia (CRO)	1	2	6	9
12	Kosovo (KOS)	1	0	1	2
13	San Marino (SMR)	0	1	1	2
14	Egypt (EGY)	0	1	0	1
15	Gibraltar (GIB)	0	0	1	1
15	Portugal (POR)	0	0	1	1
15	Serbia (SRB)	0	0	1	1
Totals (17 entries)		240	248	282	770
