= Lliga Catalana d'handbol =

Lliga Catalana of Handball (English: Catalan league of Handball) was a competition organized by the Catalan Federation of Handball at the 80's and 90's decades played by the best Catalan clubs. On 1997 was replaced by the Pyrenean handball league adding teams from the south of France.

== History ==
- 1981-82: FC Barcelona Handbol
- 1982-83: F.C. Barcelona
- 1983-84: F.C. Barcelona
- 1984-85: F.C. Barcelona
- 1985-86: BM Granollers
- 1986-87: F.C. Barcelona
- 1987-88: F.C. Barcelona
- 1988-89: BM Granollers
- 1989-90: BM Granollers
- 1990-91: F.C. Barcelona
- 1991-92: F.C. Barcelona
- 1992-93: F.C. Barcelona
- 1993-94: F.C. Barcelona
- 1994-95: F.C. Barcelona
- 1990-91: BM Granollers
- 1996-97: F.C. Barcelona

On 1997 was replaced by the Pyrenean handball league
