= Golden Cup =

- Founded: 2004
- Region: International
- Current champions: Catalonia (6th title)
- Most successful team(s): Catalonia (6th title)
- Website: Official Website

The Golden Cup is one Roller Hockey tournament disputed all years in the city of Blanes, Catalonia. The first edition was in 2004.

== Historical ==
=== Men's ===
| Edition | Year | Denomination | (gold) Gold | (silver) Silver | (bronze) Bronze |
|---|---|---|---|---|---|
| VIII | 2011 | Blanes Golden Cup | Catalonia | World Team | (Spain) Blanes HC |
| VII | 2010 | Blanes Golden Cup | Catalonia | (Spain) Blanes HC | France |
| VI | 2009 | Blanes Golden Cup | Catalonia | Italy | (Spain) Blanes HC |
| V | 2008 | Blanes Golden Cup | Catalonia | (Spain) Blanes HC | Italy |
| IV | 2007 | Grup Tarradellas Cup | (Spain) Blanes HC | World team | Catalonia |
| III | 2006 | Grup Tarradellas Cup | (Spain) Blanes HC | Italy | Catalonia |
| II | 2005 | Grup Tarradellas Cup | Catalonia | (Spain) Blanes HC | Argentina |
| I | 2004 | Golden Cup | Catalonia | (Spain) Blanes HC | France |

=== Women's ===
| Edition | Year | Denomination | (gold) Gold | (silver) Silver | (bronze) Bronze |
|---|---|---|---|---|---|
| IV | 2010 | Blanes Golden Cup | Chile | France | |
| III | 2009 | Blanes Golden Cup | Catalonia | France | Germany |
| II | 2007 | Grup Tarradellas Cup | Catalonia | France | Chile |
| I | 2006 | Grup Tarradellas Cup | Catalonia | Germany | Chile |

== Winners ==
=== Men's ===
| Team | Championships |
|---|---|
| Catalonia | 6 (2004, 2005, 2008, 2009, 2010, 2011) |
| (Spain) Blanes HC | 2 (2006, 2007) |
| Total | 8 |

=== Women's ===
| Team | Championships |
|---|---|
| Catalonia | 3 (2006, 2007, 2009) |
| Chile | 1 (2010) |
| Total | 4 |
