= Fresno Case =

- Native name: Cas Fresno
- Date: 26 November 2004
- Location: Fresno, California, United States
- Cause: Spain's opposition to the admission of Catalonia's roller hockey team as full member of FIRS
- Outcome: FIRS revokes Catalonia's provisional membership and expels it from the organization

The Fresno Case (Catalan: Cas Fresno, Spanish: Caso Fresno) is the name assigned by the Catalonia media and public opinion to the controversial decision of the Federation of International Roller Sports (FIRS) assembly held at Fresno, California, United States, on 26 November 2004, against the admission of Catalonia as a member of the organization, resulting in its expulsion and the loss of the international status it enjoyed as provisional member. It meant that for the first time in history, an international sport team that had been accepted provisionally was later not accepted definitely. At the same time, it was the first time that a regional sport team (Catalonia) had been registered with the opposition of the state the region belonged to (Spain).

The Spanish sport organizations actively lobbied against the Catalonia membership among the members of the assembly. At the Fresno assembly, the membership application was rejected (8–114). However, the Federació Catalana de Patinatge brought the case to the Court of Arbitration for Sport (TAS) at Lausanne, which admitted irregularities in the assembly (notably the lack of secrecy in the vote), invalidated the vote, and forced the FIRS to repeat the vote following the FIRS statute rules. An extraordinary FIRS assembly was held in Rome on November 24, 2005, and again rejected the membership application of the Catalan federation (125–43).

After being granted a temporary membership, Catalonia played the World Championship B, at Macau, (China), in October 2004, winning it. As a result, Catalonia qualified to play the full World Championship, where it played in the same group as Spain.

== Spain's opposition ==
Some Catalan media have denounced the pressions by the Spanish government and sport organizations on the members of the assembly.

Representatives from Chile or Italy (Sabatino Aracu, member of Forza Italia) were allegedly pressured or received instructions from their national governments. The Czech Republic representative Radek Pavelec admitted that his federation had received pressures from the Spanish government. The German representative admitted that she was contacted by the German MP for Sport demanding the vote against Catalonia. He asked her to make sure she was coming back from Fresno with a "No" against Catalonia.

In addition, a letter of the Consejo Superior de Deportes (CSD, the Spanish Council for Sports) to the Colombian federation in which the Spaniards were asking for the vote against Catalonia has been made public. In that letter the CSD stated that the recognition of Catalonia would alter the Spanish sport national unity and would create a wrong precedent. The same letter was sent to some other South American federations.

== Repetition of the vote in Rome ==
On 29 November 2005, the FIRS assembly, meeting in Rome, he repeated the final vote on the admission of the Catalan Federation of Skating. In this case, the method of voting was secret and the president of the Catalan Federation, Ramon Basiana, was able to defend the nomination.

The extraordinary meeting in Rome of the FIRS rejected by 125 votes to 43 for admission as a full member of the Catalan Federation of Skating.
