= Pyrenean handball league =

International handball sports league

Pirenees league (Catalan: Lliga dels Pirineus) is an international handball competition organized by the Catalan Federation of Handball and the Ligue Languedoc Roussillon. The teams are the best two of every federation. It was impulsed by the Catalan Federation in 1997.

FC Barcelona Handbol is the best team at this time.

== Champions ==
- 1997: FC Barcelona
- 1998: FC Barcelona
- 1999: FC Barcelona
- 2000: FC Barcelona
- 2001: FC Barcelona
- 2002: Montpellier HB
- 2003: FC Barcelona
- 2004: Montpellier Handball
- 2005: FC Barcelona
- 2006: FC Barcelona
- 2007: FC Barcelona

== Editions played ==
=== Lliga dels Pirineus 1997 ===
- Host: Andorra la Vella
- Semifinals
  - Montpellier H. - BM Granollers 25-26
  - FC Barcelona - Nice Handball 27-19
- Final
  - BM Granollers - FC Barcelona 26-35

=== Lliga dels Pirineus 1998 ===
- Host: Carcassonne
- Semifinals
  - FC Barcelona - Nïmes Gard H. 36-13
  - Montpellier H. - BM Granollers 24-26
- Final
  - BM Granollers - FC Barcelona 25-41

=== Lliga dels Pirineus 1999 ===
- Host: Sant Feliu de Llobregat
- Semifinals
  - BM Granollers - Sporting Toulouse 31 25-24
  - FC Barcelona - Montpellier H. 29-16
- Final
  - BM Granollers - FC Barcelona 18-24

=== Lliga dels Pirineus 2000 ===
- Host: Toulouse
- Semifinals
  - BM Granollers - Toulouse Spacer's 35-19
  - FC Barcelona - Montpellier H. 31-29
- Final
  - BM Granollers - FC Barcelona 24-27

=== Lliga dels Pirineus 2001 ===
- Host: Cambrils
- Semifinals
  - FC Barcelona - Sporting Toulouse 31 34-16
  - BM Granollers - USAM Nîmes 23-18
- Final
  - BM Granollers - FC Barcelona 17-31

=== Lliga dels Pirineus 2002 ===
- Host: Agde
- Semifinals
  - FC Barcelona - Paris Saint Germain 27-19
  - BM Granollers - Montpellier Handball 22-27
- Final
  - Montpellier Handball - FC Barcelona 26-22

=== Lliga dels Pirineus 2003 ===
- Host: Montcada i Reixac
- Semifinals
  - FC Barcelona - US Créteil 32-23
  - Montpellier Handball - BM Granollers 31-28
- Final
  - FC Barcelona - Montpellier Handball 36-26

=== Lliga dels Pirineus 2004 ===
- Host: Montpellier
- Semifinals
  - USAM Nîmes - FC Barcelona 22-34
  - Montpellier Handball - BM Granollers 30-24
- Final
  - Montpellier Handball - FC Barcelona 35-28

=== Lliga dels Pirineus 2005 ===
- Host: Vilanova i la Geltrú
- Semifinals
  - FC Barcelona - US Créteil 31-28
  - BM Granollers - USAM Nîmes 29-30
- Final
  - FC Barcelona - USAM Nîmes 29-22

=== Lliga dels Pirineus 2006 ===
- Host: Nîmes
- Semifinals
  - BM Granollers - USAM Nîmes 28-22
  - FC Barcelona - Paris Handball 30-31
- Tercer lloc
  - USAM Nîmes - Paris Handball 24-21
- Final
  - FC Barcelona - BM Granollers 34-21

=== Lliga dels Pirineus 2007 ===
- Host: Igualada
- Group A
  - BM Granollers 20 - USAM Nîmes 24
  - BM Granollers 22 - Montpellier HB 25
  - USAM Nîmes 20 - Montpellier HB 20
- Group B
  - FC Barcelona - 24 Paris Handball 13
  - Paris Handball 15 - CAI Aragón 20
  - FC Barcelona 21 - CAI Aragón 20
- Final round
  - BM Granollers 22 - Paris Handball 21 (5th-6th)
  - CAI Aragón - 38 Montpellier HB 30 (3rd-4th)
  - FC Barcelona 36 - USAM Nîmes 26 (Final)
- Final standings
1. FC Barcelona
2. USAM Nîmes
3. Montpellier HB
4. CAI Aragón
5. BM Granollers
6. Paris Handball
