= Dreamscape (1984 film) =

1984 film by Joseph Ruben

- Theatrical release poster by Drew Struzan
- Directed by: Joseph Ruben
- Screenplay by: David Loughery; Chuck Russell; Joseph Ruben
- Story by: David Loughery
- Produced by: Chuck Russell; Bruce Cohn Curtis
- Starring: Dennis Quaid; Kate Capshaw; Max von Sydow; Christopher Plummer; David Patrick Kelly
- Cinematography: Brian Tufano
- Edited by: Lorenzo DeStefano; Richard Halsey
- Music by: Maurice Jarre
- Production company: Zupnik-Curtis Enterprises
- Distributed by: 20th Century Fox
- Release date: August 15, 1984
- Running time: 99 minutes
- Country: United States
- Language: English
- Budget: $6 million
- Box office: $12.1-14 million

Dreamscape is a 1984 American science fiction action-adventure horror film directed by Joseph Ruben from a story by David Loughery, with Chuck Russell, Loughery, and Ruben co-writing. It stars Dennis Quaid, Kate Capshaw, Max von Sydow, Christopher Plummer and David Patrick Kelly.

== Plot ==
Alex Gardner is a psychic who has been using his talents for personal gain, which mainly consists of gambling and womanizing. When he was 19, he had been the subject of a scientific research project documenting his psychic ability but, in the midst of the study, he disappeared.

After running afoul of a local gangster and extortionist named Snead, Alex evades two of Snead's thugs by allowing himself to be taken by two men: Finch and Babcock, who identify themselves as representing an academic institution. At the institution, Alex is reunited with his former mentor, Dr. Paul Novotny, who is now involved in government-funded psychic research. Novotny, aided by fellow scientist Dr. Jane DeVries, has developed a technique that allows psychics to voluntarily link with the minds of others by projecting themselves into the subconscious during REM sleep. He equates the original idea for the dreamscape project to the practice of the Senoi natives of Malaysia, who believe the dream world is as real as reality. The project was intended for clinical use to diagnose and treat sleep disorders, particularly nightmares, but it has been hijacked by Bob Blair, a government agent. Novotny convinces Alex to join the program in order to investigate Blair's intentions. Alex gains experience with the technique by helping a man who is worried about his wife's infidelity and by treating a young boy named Buddy, who is plagued with nightmares so terrible that a previous psychic lost his sanity trying to help him. Buddy's nightmare involves a sinister "snake-man".

Alex and Jane's growing infatuation culminates with Alex sneaking into Jane's dream to have sex with her, though she protests when she wakes up. He does this without technological aid, which no one else has been able to achieve. With the help of novelist Charlie Prince, who has been covertly investigating the project for a new book, Alex learns that Blair intends to use the dream-linking technique for assassination, as people who die in their dreams also die in the real world.

Blair murders Prince and Novotny to silence them. The president of the United States is admitted as a patient due to recurring nightmares. Blair assigns Tommy Ray Glatman, a mentally unstable psychic who murdered his own father, to enter the president's nightmare and assassinate him. Blair considers the president's nightmares about nuclear holocaust to be a sign of political weakness, which he deems a liability in the upcoming negotiations for nuclear disarmament.

Following an escape from a car with Blair and his goons, Alex flees on a motorcycle and ends up at the racetrack where Snead's thugs work. He makes a deal with them to call five winners at the racetrack in exchange for their distracting Blair's goons as he escapes back to the institution. He discovers Novotny's dead body and forces one of Blair's goons to tell him about the plan to kill the president. Alex projects himself into the president's dream—a nightmare of a post-nuclear war wasteland—to try to protect him. Tommy rips out a police officer's heart and attempts to incite a mutant-mob against the president, then battles Alex in the form of the snake-man from Buddy's dream. Alex assumes the appearance of Tommy's murdered father in order to distract him, allowing the president to impale him with a spear. The president is grateful to Alex but reluctant to confront Blair, who wields considerable political power. To protect himself and Jane, Alex enters Blair's dream and kills him before Blair can retaliate.

Jane and Alex board a train to Louisville, Kentucky, intent on making their previous dream encounter a reality. They are surprised to meet the ticket collector from Jane's dream, but they decide to ignore it and keep on.

== Cast ==
- Dennis Quaid as Alex Gardner, a psychic, Jane's love interest and Paul's former student.
- Max von Sydow as Paul Novotny, a scientist and Alex's former mentor.
- Christopher Plummer as Bob Blair
- Kate Capshaw as Jane DeVries, a scientist and Alex's love interest.
- David Patrick Kelly as Tommy Ray Glatman
- George Wendt as Charlie Prince
- Eddie Albert as The President
- Chris Mulkey as Gary Finch
- Larry Gelman as Mr. Webber
- Cory Yothers as Buddy
- Redmond Gleeson as Snead, gangster and extortionist.
- Eric Gold as Tommy Ray's father
- Peter Jason as Roy Babcock
- Jana Taylor as Mrs. Webber

== Production ==
Bruce Cohn Curtis, nephew of Columbia Pictures Corporation co-founder Harry Cohn, having worked as a producer since 1968 beginning with Otley, sought to create his own production after experiencing frustration with working under other producers (notably Irwin Yablans on Hell Night and The Seduction) who would often ignore his ideas. With the backing of businessman Stanley Zupnik, Curtis formed Zupnik-Curtis Enterprises.

=== Development ===
According to author Roger Zelazny, the film developed from an initial outline that he wrote in 1981, based in part upon his novella He Who Shapes and 1966 novel The Dream Master. He was not involved in the project after 20th Century Fox bought his outline. Because he did not write the film treatment or the script, his name does not appear in the credits; assertions that he removed his name from the credits are unfounded.

After directing the pilot episode for the television series, Breaking Away, Joseph Ruben began looking for his next project. After coming across David Loughery's script for Dreamscape through the William Morris Agency, Ruben was engrossed by the visuals Loughery described in the script. Ruben showed the script to his assistant director Chuck Russell who in turn suggested they show it to Curtis as they'd both previously worked with him Joyride and Gorp and knew he was looking for potential scripts for his new company. After Curtis formally acquired and greenlit Dreamscape, Curtis provided hands on feedback and direction to Ruben and Russell who spent seven months rewriting the original script with Loughery brought in towards the end to help assist in the final draft. Russell stated that much of rewrites were centered around scaling down the ideas in the initial script such as the recurring nuclear holocaust nightmare suffered by Eddie Albert's president which originally took place in New York City and featured a destroyed Statue of Liberty and a backdrop of fiery seas with boats of the undead that would not have been filmable. Another change Ruben and Russell made to the script included expanding the character of Buddy who they felt was instrumental in Alex Gardner's development from a selfish opportunist into a hero.

=== Effects and design ===
Craig Reardon handled makeup effects and Peter Kuran's effects studio VCE was hired to handled the optical and miniature effects. Stop motion animation provided by Jim Aupperle was partially used to bring to life the Snakeman.

Initially the creature that terrorized Buddy in his nightmares was described as a "rat-man" but it was felt it wouldn't be possible to distinguish it from the recent werewolves seen in The Howling and An American Werewolf in London and at Ruben's suggestion they went with something based on snakes as he had a fear of them leading Russell to produce some drawings for the snake-man that he claimed to be inspired by a childhood viewing of 7 Faces of Dr. Lao.

=== Filming ===
Principal photography began February 3, 1983 in Los Angeles. Locations included Los Angeles Union Station, Los Alamitos Race Course, and the University of the Pacific in Stockton.

The music score is by French composer Maurice Jarre.

== Release ==
Dreamscape was released on August 15, 1984. The film was a box office success grossing 12.1 million dollars on a 6 million dollar budget. This was the second film released to movie theaters that was rated PG-13 under then-new MPAA ratings guidelines, following Red Dawn, which had come out five days prior. The film was released on DVD on June 6, 2000, January 4, 2005, and April 7, 2015.

== Reception ==
On the review aggregator website Rotten Tomatoes, 78% of 32 critics' reviews are positive. The website's consensus reads: "Dreamscape mixes several genres -- horror, sci-fi, action -- and always maintains a sense of adventure and humor." Metacritic, which uses a weighted average, assigned the film a score of 63 out of 100, based on 10 critics, indicating "generally favorable" reviews.

In the Chicago Sun-Times, Roger Ebert gave the film 3 out of 4 stars, writing:

Dreamscape is three different movies, all fighting to get inside one another. It's a political conspiracy thriller, a science fiction adventure, and sort of a love story. Most movies that try to crowd so much into an hour and a half end up looking like a shopping list, but Dreamscape works, maybe because it has a sense of humor.

== See also ==
- List of American films of 1984
