= Happy Hell Night =

- Original release poster
- Directed by: Brian Owens
- Screenplay by: Michael Fitzpatrick; Brian Owens; Ron Petersen
- Produced by: Pavlina Proevska
- Starring: Nick Gregory; Darren McGavin; Frank John Hughes; Sam Rockwell
- Cinematography: Sol Negrin
- Edited by: David Mitchell
- Music by: Nenad Bach
- Production company: Pavlina Ltd.
- Distributed by: Quest Entertainment
- Release date: 1991
- Running time: 87 minutes
- Countries: Canada; Yugoslavia
- Language: English

Happy Hell Night (also known as Frat Night) is a 1991 Canadian-Yugoslav production slasher film directed by Brian Owens and starring Darren McGavin and Nick Gregory. The film also features brief appearances by Sam Rockwell and Jorja Fox in their early careers.

== Plot ==
On Halloween night 1965, a fallen Catholic priest named Zachary Malius murders seven fraternity pledges from Winfield College who apparently broke into his family's crypt and enacted an occult initiation ritual. After being confronted by his peer, Father Cane, who believed Malius was possessed, Malius was incarcerated in an insane asylum for his crimes; Henry Collins, a pledge that year, was the only survivor.

In 1991, during pledge week, the university students are preparing for hell night. Fraternity member Eric Collins, the son of Henry, is suggested by his fraternity brother Ned to have the new pledges break into the local insane asylum and photograph Malius as their initiation ritual. Eric later mentions the prospect to his father over the phone, which causes Henry to cut their call short. Later that afternoon, Eric finds his girlfriend Liz having sex with his younger brother, Sonny, in a hotel room. To punish him, Eric appoints Sonny and fellow pledge Ralph to photograph Malius as their initiation. Sonny and Ralph break into the asylum and find Malius's cell sequestered in the basement, but when Ralph attempts to take a photo, Malius attacks and kills him. Sonny flees on his motorcycle while Malius murders a nurse orderly before escaping.

Meanwhile, Liz arrives at the party with her friend, Susan, and attempts to apologize to Eric at the party, but is rebuffed. She finds Ned Bara, a nerdy fraternity member, downstairs, and he inadvertently reveals Sonny's initiation ritual to her. Concerned when Sonny fails to return by midnight, Liz stops by the local church and seeks advice from the priest, Father Cane. When she explains Sonny's initiation assignment, Cane panics and urges her to go into hiding. Back at the fraternity house, the party begins to phase out, and Eric initiates sex with a Kappa Sigma sorority sister, but she stops him when he cannot find a condom. She attempts to leave the fraternity house, but is subsequently murdered in her car by Malius, who drives an ice axe through her head. Malius subsequently kills several partygoers in the house. Meanwhile, Henry, arrives in town and visits the church, where he finds Cane's body hanging posed as the Cross of Saint Peter above the altar.

Liz returns to the fraternity shortly after, finding it apparently empty. Throughout the house, she discovers multiple corpses before being confronted by Malius, but she evades him. Eric and Sonny subsequently arrive, and the three band together with Ned, who has closed-circuit monitors of the house in his room. Communicating to Ned via a walkie-talkie, Eric, Sonny, and Liz locate Susan, who is decapitated in the attic. Malius stalks them through the house, before Eric shoots him with a speargun, and he falls out a window. Henry arrives moments later, and confesses that he and Malius conspired together in 1963 to recreate a Satanic ritual, in which Henry made a pact with the devil that yielded him power and wealth. Malius, unfazed, murders Ned downstairs before impaling Henry with the ice axe through the door, killing him.

Eric, Sonny, and Liz find a book in Latin inside Henry's satchel detailing the ritual he performed with Malius twenty-five years earlier. Eric and Liz run to the cemetery and attempt to recreate the ritual in the Malius crypt. Malius arrives and stabs Eric through the chin, but is stopped from killing him when Sonny arrives moments later. Sonny and Liz complete the ritual, but Malius takes Sonny with him to hell. The police arrive at the cemetery shortly after, and Liz leaves with Eric in an ambulance. As she assures Eric everything is going to be alright, the ambulance driver turns around and reveals himself to be Malius.

== Cast ==
- Nick Gregory as Eric Collins
- Darren McGavin as Henry Collins
  - Sam Rockwell as Young Henry Collins
- Charles Cragin as Father Zachary Malius
- Frank John Hughes as Sonny Collins
- Laura Carney as Liz
- Kate Delay as Susan
- Elvis Restaino as Jake
- Janez Vrhovec as Father Cane
  - Irfan Mensur as Young Father Cane
- Jeffrey Miller as Ralph
- Scott Bell as Pete
- Ted Clark as Ned Bara
- Tatjana Pujin as Kimberly
- Gala Videnović as Marjorie
- Jorja Fox as Kappa Sig Girl
- Lisa Rankin as Nurse

== Production ==
The film was shot in Belgade, Yugoslavia with minor pick ups in Toronto, Ontario, Canada, and was financed through Briusn entertainment and Pavlina Ltd., both US-based film production companies.

== Release ==
Happy Hell Night was released on video in the United States in April 1992, and was released in the United Kingdom on video under the title Hell Night (not to be confused with the 1981 film of the same name). It was also released under the title Frat Night in Europe. It subsequently screened on the Cinemax network throughout October 1992.

=== Home media ===
The film was released on DVD by Anchor Bay Entertainment on August 3, 2004. It was released for the first time on Blu-ray in a limited run by Code Red DVD on December 5, 2016, featuring a new 2k scan from the original vault materials.

=== Addition distributors ===
Since 2020 worldwide sales are handles by the LA-based Gorilla Pictures; 4K Blue-ray by Terror Vision.

== Reception ==
Critical reception for Happy Hell Night has been mostly negative. In a particularly scathing review, TV Guide wrote, "Happy Hell Night is the decrepit mule train of slasher films, taking up the rear and sweeping up the malignant droppings of the Friday the 13th, Halloween and Nightmare on Elm Street series, not to mention scores of other horror gore-fests of the 1980s. Mondo Digital wrote, "Strangely edited, extremely bloody, and often baffling, it's the kind of film slasher fanatics stumble on and scratch their heads trying to figure out how it all came together."

Jim Harper covered the film in his book Legacy of Blood, praising the film's gore and the acting of Charles Cragin. HorrorNews.net also praised the gore and special effects, while criticizing the pacing.

== Sources ==
- Harper, Jim (2004). Legacy of Blood: A Comprehensive Guide to Slasher Movies. Critical Vision. ISBN 978-1-900-48639-2.
