= The Seduction (film) =

1982 film by David Schmoeller

- Original film poster
- Directed by: David Schmoeller
- Written by: David Schmoeller
- Produced by: Bruce Cohn Curtis; Irwin Yablans
- Starring: Morgan Fairchild; Michael Sarrazin; Vince Edwards; Andrew Stevens; Colleen Camp; Kevin Brophy
- Cinematography: Mac Ahlberg
- Edited by: Anthony DiMarco
- Music by: Lalo Schifrin
- Distributed by: Embassy Pictures
- Release dates: January 16, 1982 (Atlantic City, New Jersey); January 22, 1982 (U.S.)
- Running time: 104 minutes
- Country: United States
- Language: English
- Budget: $2 million
- Box office: $4.7 million—$11.4 million

The Seduction is a 1982 American thriller film written and directed by David Schmoeller, and starring Morgan Fairchild, Michael Sarrazin, Vince Edwards, and Andrew Stevens. Its plot follows Los Angeles news anchor Jamie Douglas who is aggressively pursued by obsessive male stalker Derek Sanford. The original music score was composed by Lalo Schifrin. Reviews for the film have mainly been negative which resulted in three Golden Raspberry Award nominations, including two for Fairchild.

== Plot ==
Jamie Douglas is a beautiful, successful news writer and anchor in Los Angeles, in a stable relationship with her long-term boyfriend, Brandon. Jamie begins receiving anonymous phone calls and flowers from a man named Derek Sanford, a psychotic photographer who is obsessed with her. Initially, Jamie dismisses them as harmless flattery from an "admirer," until Derek retrieves her phone number and begins calling her house in the Hollywood Hills, as well as that of her neighbor, a fashion model named Robin Dunlap. Derek manages to access Jamie's dressing room at the office she works at, and gives her a box of candy, apologizing to her for his pestering calls. Jamie is sympathetic toward him, and thanks him for the gift.

Despite her accepting his apology for the phone calls, Derek continues to obsessively stalk Jamie, who is unaware that his home is adjacent to her property. One afternoon he accosts her in her living room, maniacally photographing her as she fends him off. Brandon arrives and stops the attack, beating Derek significantly. Bloodied, Derek thanks Jamie, and leaves. Jamie visits Maxwell, a police officer friend, seeking advice. Maxwell explains that Jamie has few options, as Derek has technically not committed any crimes. Meanwhile, Derek follows Robin to one of her modeling jobs. He introduces himself as a friend of Jamie's, but Robin realizes he is the man who has been calling her and Jamie's homes. Derek pleads for Robin to convince Jamie to go on a date with him, but Robin forces him out.

Later, Derek confronts Jamie and Robin at the mall, where Jamie sternly tells him she despises him, and to leave her alone. Brandon consults with psychologist Dr. Weston about Jamie's situation, and Dr. Weston advises him that Derek likely suffers from erotomania, a delusional disorder in which he believes his affections for Jamie, a stranger, are reciprocated. One night, Derek breaks into Jamie's house and watches her from her bedroom closet, fondling himself while she takes a bath. After realizing Derek is in the house, she retrieves Brandon, but Derek flees through a window and escapes. Later, one of Derek's coworkers at the photo studio, Julie, attempts to ask him on a date. He politely declines, telling her he is engaged to be married.

As part of a news story, Jamie attends a funeral for a female victim of an unknown serial killer, dubbed the "Sweetheart Killer." While reviewing the footage, Jamie notices Derek standing behind her in the cemetery. Derek breaches the news station posing as a newsrunner, and brings a "last-minute addition" for Jamie's broadcast. During the live taping, a message from Derek runs on Jamie's teleprompter. Distraught, Jamie pleads on air for help, telling her viewers that she has a stalker who is going to kill her. That night, Brandon comforts Jamie, and the two relax in her hot tub. The two begin to have sex, but Derek emerges from the shadows and stabs Brandon to death. Jamie flees into the house to phone police, but is put on hold. Meanwhile, Derek buries Brandon's body in his yard.

Dejected and at a loss for what to do, Jamie phones Derek at his home, begging him to come back. When he returns to the house, she begins firing at him with a shotgun, and he crashes through a window to escape. Jamie phones Derek again, and tauntingly offers herself to him. Meanwhile, Julie arrives at Derek's to warn him that the police questioned her about him; during their conversation, Maxwell arrives at Derek's home and warns him to leave Jamie alone, stating that in exchange he will keep him from going to jail for harassment. After Maxwell leaves, Julie professes her love to Derek, but he grows enraged when she tells him Jamie does not love him. Julie storms out to her car, and notices Derek sneaking into Jamie's backyard moments later. Derek enters the house and threatens Jamie with a knife. She manages to force him off her, and the two fight in her bedroom. Derek wrests her to the bed, and begins attempting to rape her. In response, Jamie begins to aggressively offer herself to him, unbuttoning his shirt and pants, but he quickly shows cowardice, unwittingly revealing he is impotent. Disgusted at Derek's hypocrisy, Jamie attempts to leave, until an enraged Derek attacks her and prepares to kill her, only to be shot dead by Julie, who stumbles in on the scene.

== Cast ==
- Morgan Fairchild as Jamie Douglas
- Michael Sarrazin as Brandon
- Vince Edwards as Maxwell
- Andrew Stevens as Derek Sanford
- Colleen Camp as Robin Dunlap
- Kevin Brophy as Bobby
- Betty Kean as Mrs. Caluso
- Wendy Smith Howard as Julie
- Joanne Linville as Dr. Weston
- Marri Mak as Lisa

== Production ==
=== Screenplay ===
The Seduction was written and directed by David Schmoeller, who had previously directed the slasher film Tourist Trap (1979). Irwin Yablans served as a co-producer alongside Bruce Cohn Curtis, marking their third producing collaboration after Roller Boogie (1979) and Hell Night (1981). According to Morgan Fairchild, Schmoeller's screenplay was partly inspired by a real stalking case revolving around a Los Angeles newscaster who was harassed by an obsessed viewer.

=== Filming ===
Filming took place in Los Angeles over a period of seven weeks in the spring of 1981. Producer Irwin Yablans had hoped to complete production before the June 30 expiry of the Directors Guild of America contract. The shoot was met by several protests when Yablans hired an exclusively non-union crew. Frank Capra Jr. served as an executive producer on the film.

=== Music ===
Dionne Warwick sings the theme song over the opening titles.

== Release ==
=== Box office ===
The Seduction premiered in Atlantic City, New Jersey on January 16, 1982. It had its Los Angeles opening the following week on January 22, before opening in New York City on February 26. It opened number 6 at the U.S. box office, and eventually went on to gross a domestic total of $11.4 million.

=== Critical response ===
Jon Marlowe of The Miami News compared the film unfavorably to several contemporary stalker-themed films, including Lipstick (1976) and The Fan (1981). Vincent Canby of The New York Times deemed the film "an often comically inept, unsuccessfully vicious nonthriller." Jack Mathews of the Detroit Free Press published a one-star review, questioning whether viewers would spend $4 or $5 to see Morgan Fairchild unclothed in a laughably implausible thriller.

The film was nominated for a total of three Golden Raspberry Awards, including two for Fairchild (for Worst Actress and Worst New Star), and Colleen Camp (for Worst Supporting Actress) at the 3rd Golden Raspberry Awards.

=== Awards and nominations ===
Award	Category	Nominee(s)	Result	Ref.
Golden Raspberry Awards	Worst Actress	Morgan Fairchild	Nominated	
Golden Raspberry Awards	Worst Supporting Actress	Colleen Camp	Nominated	
Golden Raspberry Awards	Worst New Star	Morgan Fairchild	Nominated	

=== Home media ===
Media Home Entertainment released The Seduction on VHS and Betamax in September 1982. Anchor Bay Entertainment released The Seduction on DVD in November 2006. Scream Factory released the film on Blu-ray for the first time on May 21, 2019.

== Sources ==
- Donahue, Suzanne Mary (1987). American Film Distribution: The Changing Marketplace. Ann Arbor, Michigan: UMI Research Press. ISBN 978-0-835-71776-2.
