= Jim Bray =

American artistic roller skater (born 1961)

- Born: 1961 (age 64–65)
- Known for: Freestyle artistic roller skating, acting
- Notable work: Roller Boogie (1979)
- Television: Star City Roll Out (1983)

Jim Bray (born 1961) is an American professional freestyle artistic roller skater. A performer and instructor, Bray competed in freestyle artistic skating for nearly a decade, before giving up his amateur status in order to co-star alongside Linda Blair in 1979 musical teensploitation film Roller Boogie.

By the time he was 18, Bray had earned 275 trophies and "won every Artistic Singles event from Primary Boys to Senior Men's in his Regional competitions". He has been United States amateur roller skating champion 8 times and skated competitively for 15 years.

In 1981, Roller Skating Magazine (published by Surfer Publications) wrote that Bray's "ability to turn his roller skating talent into a marketable career has been a pleasure and inspiration to millions all over the world".

== Life ==
Jim Bray was born in 1961 and grew up in Ontario, California, as an only child. He graduated from Chaffey High School in Ontario, California.

=== Competitive skating ===
He began skating competitively in 1967, at 6 years of age. He stated that he first got interested in roller skating "from some girls who were neighbors". In his youth, he practiced daily after school from 3 PM to 7:30 PM.

Bray studied under various Californian coaches, including Chris Baerg of Downey, Rick Weber of Simi Valley, and Omar and Delores Dunn of Bakersfield.

At 13 years of age, he set his intentions on competing in the Olympics as well as the Artistic Skating World Championships. He has thanked his parents' support, stating, "They were my number one fans. They gave me everything. The skates. The joy of it. They were behind me all the time".

As of 1979, his major event was the Senior Men's International Skating competition, though he also skated Artistic Pairs. His other hobbies included water skiing, snow skiing, basketball, watching football, and coaching Little League Baseball.

Bray stated in a 1979 interview that he was inspired by Canadian figure skater Toller Cranston, but Michael Jacques was the skater he admired most. Bray stated, "I used to watch [Jacques] all the time and he was my idol...I'll never forget how he used to skate. He might be sideways jumping and still land right. I always wanted to be like him".

=== Roller Boogie and subsequent fame ===
Bray was scouted by producers who had seen a writeup and photoshoot about him, likely in Roller Skating Magazine. While he was initially a stunt man, he ended up being cast alongside Linda Blair because the producers could not find a leading actor who was familiar with roller skating. He was given acting and voice lessons to prepare him for the film. Blair would become a close friend of Bray's.

In 1981, describing his experience of Roller Boogie's 1979 premiere, Bray stated,

Premiere night was really weird! First of all, Linda and I arrived an hour late! I was so nervous because I'd invited everyone I knew! In the opening scene when it says "Introducing Jim Bray," my whole family started clapping! I was so embarrassed at first, and then I decided what the heck and settled down a little. I looked for all the bad spots, naturally, and just kept thinking about how strange it was to watch myself become someone else.

In 1980, Bray co-hosted a one-hour pilot for the Nickelodeon channel, titled Star City Roll Out, filmed at New York's Roxy Roller Rink. It featured "professional roller dancers, stunt skaters, and a top name musical group". Interviewees included Erik Estrada, Loni Anderson and Valerie Bertinelli; Bray intended to feature disco band "Le Chic" [sic]. The pilot aired as part of Nickelodeon anthology series Special Delivery. It featured the music of Zero Cool, Nona Hendryx, and Blondie. It reran in 1981 and 1983.

He appeared on The Big Show in 1980, alongside Steve Allen, Gary Coleman, Loni Andersen and Peggy Fleming. Likely the same year, on The Don Lane Show, he demonstrated rollerskating tricks, to audience applause. He stated that he planned to star in three films in 1980: Parasite; A Crosstown Kid; and Romeo and Juliet.

The following year, he began work as a disc jockey at the Skateway rink in Chino. He was also an aerobic fitness teacher. He planned trips to Mexico and South Africa, presumably with The Jim Bray Traveling Show, though it is unknown if they occurred. He has also expressed interest in being on Battle of the Network Stars, though it has not yet been ascertained whether he participated in the broadcasts. He also recorded demo tracks for a rock album.

Some time before 1981, he developed a touring roller company titled The Jim Bray Traveling Show, which incorporated 15 show skaters. They performed in Mexico City as well as unspecified cities in Chile and Brazil. According to Roller Skating Magazine, Bray was "mobbed by fans in Brazil who knocked him unconscious in their determined effort to get close to [Bray]". When transported to a local hospital, "the doctor in attendance requested Jim's autograph" before providing him with treatment for his minor injuries.

== See also ==
- List of roller skaters
