= Peter Barton (actor) =

American actor

- Born: Peter Thomas Barton; July 19, 1956 (age 70); Valley Stream, New York, U.S.
- Occupations: Film, television actor
- Years active: 1979–2005
- Height: 5 ft 9 in (1.75 m)

Peter Thomas Barton (born July 19, 1956) is an American retired actor. He starred in The Powers of Matthew Star, with Louis Gossett Jr.; Burke's Law with Gene Barry; and the soap opera Sunset Beach. Named one of the 10 sexiest guys in soaps by Playgirl, Barton is also known for his role as Scott Grainger on the daytime drama The Young and the Restless.

== Early life ==
Peter Barton is originally from Valley Stream, Long Island, New York. He is a graduate of Valley Stream North High School, where he played soccer and wrestled. He attended nearby Nassau Community College. Although accepted into St. John's University School of Medicine, he changed his mind about attending. Just before signing up for classes, he decided to pursue a career in modeling and acting.

== Career ==
Even though Barton had no formal acting training, in 1979 he starred as Bill Miller in the short-lived NBC TV series Shirley, starring Shirley Jones, Rosanna Arquette, and Tracey Gold. The show ran for 13 episodes. NBC still had him under contract at the end of 1980, and it connected him with prominent acting coach Vincent Chase, and when the series ended, he was cast as the lead in another NBC series, The Powers of Matthew Star. He won the role over many actors, among them Tom Cruise.

In the 1980s, teen magazines were looking for the next big cover, and Barton was featured on many of them, including Tiger Beat and 16, He has also appeared on many TV shows such as The Fall Guy and The Love Boat.

Barton saw his popularity dwindling by the end of 1983, and he "wanted to give up acting". However, he became involved in the burgeoning teen horror/thriller film genre, beginning with Hell Night (1981) and followed by Friday the 13th: The Final Chapter (1984).

I had just been talked into doing this movie called Hell Night, with Linda Blair. I didn't even want to do it — they had to get me drunk to convince me. So it was a miserable time, and it was a great time. I wouldn't exchange the experience of making Hell Night, even though I was petrified all the way through it. So when The Final Chapter was offered to me, I was like, 'I don't really want to do Friday the 13th.' Eventually, I only did it because of Amy Steel — she talked me into it. And I thought it was really cool because it was The Final Chapter. In my mind, I thought, 'Oh, I'll be in the last one. That's kind of cool. These things are famous.' Little did I know.

— Peter Barton

After outgrowing his ability to appear as a teenager, Barton acquired mostly television roles as an adult. In 1988, he was cast in a lead role as Dr. Scott Grainger on The Young and the Restless. After leaving the show in 1993, he starred on Burke's Law with Gene Barry and the soap opera Sunset Beach. His last acting roles to date were in the 2005 film Repetition and a return appearance on The Young and the Restless that same year.

== Personal life ==
On July 16, 2012, a man in Illinois named Ray Fulk died at age 71. Fulk, who had no family of his own, was a fan of Peter Barton and Barton's former Hell Night castmate, Lucan star Kevin Brophy. Despite never having met either actor, Fulk bequeathed half of his $1.3m estate to each of the actors. The story of their good fortune was featured in "Role of a Lifetime", the third episode of the TLC show Suddenly Rich.

== Filmography ==
List of roles in film
Year	Title	Role	Notes
1980	Stir	Rifle Warder	
1981	Hell Night	Jeff Reed	
1984	Friday the 13th: The Final Chapter	Doug Bell	
2000	A Man Is Mostly Water	Jack	
2005	Repetition	Terry Goldstein	

List of roles in television
Year	Title	Role	Notes
1979–1980	Shirley	Bill Miller	13 episodes
1982	The First Time	Steve Kingsley	TV film
1982	Leadfoot	Murph	TV special
1982–1983	The Powers of Matthew Star	Matthew Star	22 episodes
1984	The Love Boat	Byron	2 episodes
1985	The Fall Guy	Simon Gordon	Episode: "The Life of Riley"
1987	Vanity Fair	Bosun	Episode: "Out Friend the Major"
1987	Rags to Riches	Brady Ladean	Episode: "Beauty and the Babe"
1988–2005	The Young and the Restless	Dr. Scott Grainger	211 episodes
1993	The Bold and the Beautiful	Dr. Scott Grainger	Episode: "Episode #1.1671"
1994–1995	Burke's Law	Detective Peter Burke	25 episodes
1995	University Hospital	Peter Piper	Episode: "You Can Run..."
1996	Pacific Blue	Greg 'Dingo' Vernon	Episode: "Burnout"
1997–1998	Sunset Beach	Eddie Connors	167 episodes
1998	Love Boat: The Next Wave	Tom	Episode: "It Takes Two to Tango"
1999	Baywatch	Damon Lusk	Episode: "Baywatch Grand Prix"

List of television guest appearances as himself
Year	Title	Notes
1983	Battle of the Network Stars XIV	
1993	Family Feud	Game show
1993	Vicki!	TV talk show
