= Chuck Russell =

American filmmaker (1958–2026)

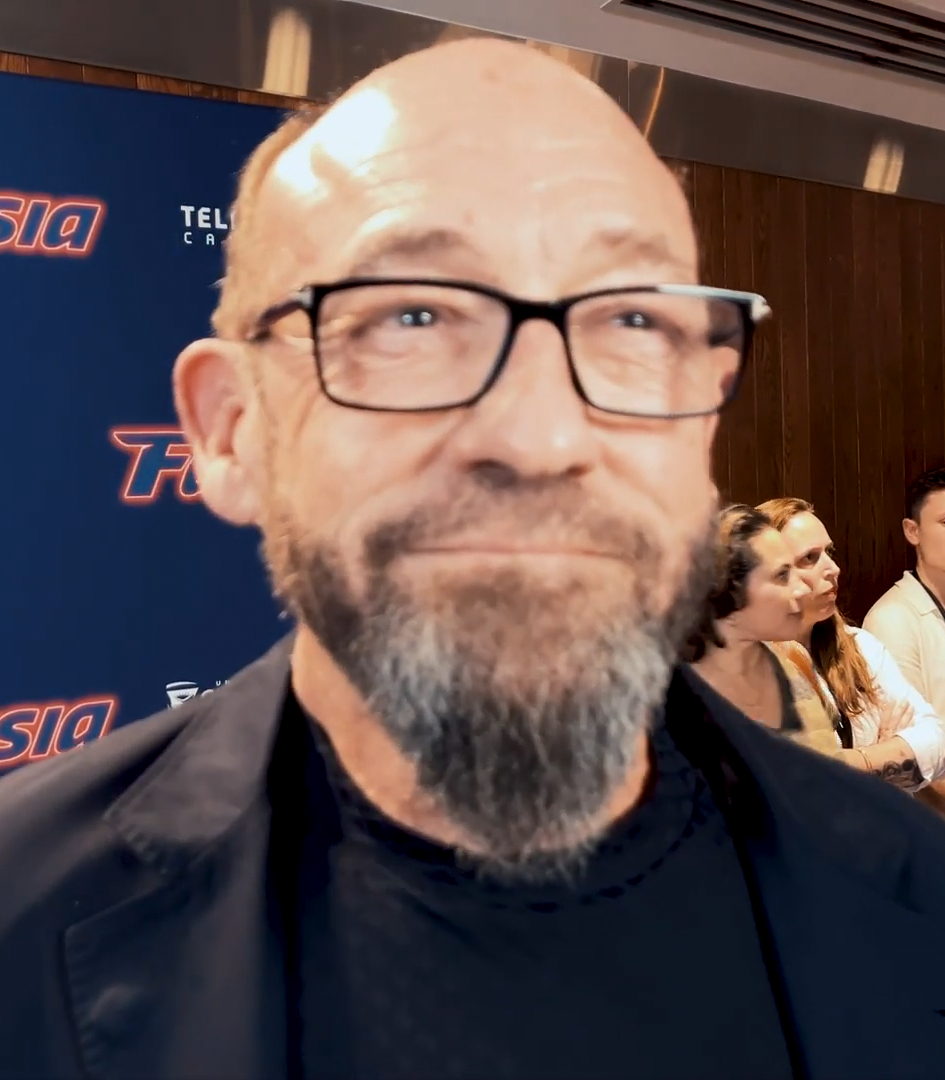
- Russell in 2024
- Born: Charles Raymond Russell; May 9, 1952; Park Ridge, Illinois, U.S.
- Died: July 22, 2026 (aged 74); San Diego, California, U.S.
- Education: University of Illinois Chicago
- Occupations: Film director, screenwriter, producer
- Years active: 1973–2024
- Spouses: Patti Rao (div. 2005); Ania Zeyne (m. 2007)
- Children: 3

Charles Raymond Russell (May 9, 1952 – July 22, 2026) was an American film director, screenwriter and producer. He was best known for directing the films A Nightmare on Elm Street 3: Dream Warriors (1987), The Blob (1988), The Mask (1994), Eraser (1996), and The Scorpion King (2002).

== Life and career ==
Russell was born in Park Ridge, Illinois on May 9, 1952.

He entered the film industry as a production manager and assistant director on independent films, while writing screenplays. During the production of the film Hell Night, he met writer Frank Darabont, with whom he would become a close collaborator. His first produced script was the 1984 film Dreamscape, directed by Joseph Ruben and starring Dennis Quaid.

In 1987, Russell made his directorial debut with A Nightmare on Elm Street 3: Dream Warriors. At that time, New Line Cinema was uncertain about the future of the franchise, but Russell convinced them that the series could take a step further into Freddy's nightmare world through advanced visual effects and dramatize the bond among Freddy's youthful victims with the concept of Dream Warriors. The success of the film redefined the franchise, earning more at the box office than the first two films put together.

In 1988, Russell went on to write and direct the cult horror film The Blob, once again stretching the boundaries of visual effects on a limited budget.

Russell then found international acclaim with the blockbuster The Mask, about a bank clerk who discovers an ancient mask that transforms him into a malicious prankster who uses practical jokes to fight crime. The film created groundbreaking digital technologies with George Lucas's Industrial Light and Magic, combining live action performance with radically new concepts in visual effects.

With a production budget of $18 million, The Mask earned more than $350 million in worldwide box office. The film was also nominated for the Academy Award for Best Visual Effects, and created international stardom for both Jim Carrey and Cameron Diaz.

In the following years, Russell went on to direct the action films Eraser (1996) with Arnold Schwarzenegger, and The Scorpion King (2002), with WWE star Dwayne "The Rock" Johnson in his first leading role. Both films were #1 box office hits upon their release.

Russell was originally attached to direct the 2004 film Collateral, though ultimately the production was passed on to Michael Mann. Russell retained an executive producer credit, while Darabont was an uncredited script doctor.

After a 14 year hiatus from directing feature films (while working on an episode of the television series Fringe), Russell's next film was 2016's I Am Wrath starring John Travolta. In 2019, he directed Junglee, an Indian action-adventure film.

The 66-year-old director worked with elephants and the song-and-dance tradition unique to Indian cinema for the first time. Both were inspiring, according to Scroll.in during a recent visit to Mumbai.

In 2022, Russell directed Paradise City, starring Bruce Willis and Travolta.

Russell was the co-founder of A-Nation, a film production company utilizing blockchain technology.

In 2024, Russell wrote and directed Witchboard, a remake of the 1986 film.

On July 22, 2026, Russell died at his home in the San Diego Area, at the age of 74.

== Filmography ==
Year	Title	Director	Writer	Producer	Notes
1984	Dreamscape	No	Yes	Associate	
1987	A Nightmare on Elm Street 3: Dream Warriors	Yes	Yes	No	
1988	The Blob	Yes	Yes	No	
1994	The Mask	Yes	No	Executive	
1996	Eraser	Yes	No	Executive	
2000	Bless the Child	Yes	No	No	
2002	The Scorpion King	Yes	No	No	
2010	Fringe	Yes	No	No	Episode "The Abducted"
2016	I Am Wrath	Yes	No	No	
2019	Junglee	Yes	No	No	
2022	Paradise City	Yes	Yes	No	
2024	Witchboard	Yes	Yes	Yes	

Producer only

Year	Title	Director	Notes
1979	Cheerleaders' Wild Weekend	Jeff Werner	
1980	The Hearse	George Bowers	Line producer
1981	Hell Night	Tom DeSimone	Executive producer
1982	The Seduction	David Schmoeller	Executive producer
1984	Body Rock	Marcelo Epstein	Associate producer
1985	Girls Just Want to Have Fun	Alan Metter	
1986	Back to School	Alan Metter	
2004	Collateral	Michael Mann	Executive producer
