= Foolish Years =

Yugoslav film series

The Foolish Years (Serbian: Lude godine / Луде године) is a Yugoslav film series spawned from the 1977 movie of the same name. The original film and its nine sequels were all directed by Zoran Čalić between 1977 and 1992. In Yugoslavia, the entire series eventually became widely known by an informal name, Žikina dinastija (Žika's Dynasty), actually the title of its seventh film (sixth sequel) released in 1985 that parodied the American TV soap opera Dynasty, which was enormously popular throughout Yugoslavia in the mid-1980s.

What would eventually turn into a film series began in 1977 with Lude godine. Centered around a teenage couple, Boba (Vladimir Petrović) and Marija (Rialda Kadrić), one of the film's goals was addressing societal issues such as unprotected sex and teen pregnancy. However, the ensemble of supporting characters—most notably the respective in-laws Živorad "Žika" Pavlović (Dragomir Bojanić Gidra) and Milan Todorović (Marko Todorović)—captured audiences' attention by displaying great comedic potential. This would later be exploited in nine subsequent sequels as each one revolved around the pair of in-laws—unrefined, working-class Žika and strait-laced intellectual Milan—rather than the young couple.

Nearly every single film in the series was lambasted by film critics. Most disliked it for what they saw to be poor directorial choices and crude folksy humour loaded with rural and urban stereotypes that are displayed through the characters of Žika and Milan, respectively. Despite its low-brow reputation, the series proved to be a valuable training ground and career springboard for many acting talents and future stars of Yugoslav/Serb cinema like Sonja Savić, Zoran Cvijanović, Nikola Kojo, Gala Videnović, Branko Đurić and others.

Domestically, the films were box-office successes, and were popular in the USSR.

== Films ==
The films in the series are:

- Lude godine (Foolish Years), (1977)
- Došlo doba da se ljubav proba (It's Time for Love) a.k.a. Lude godine II (Wacky Years II, 1980)
- Ljubi, ljubi, al' glavu ne gubi (Sure, Have Fun with Women but Don't Lose Your Head, 1981)
- Kakav deda takav unuk (Like Grandpa, Like Grandson, 1983)
- Idi mi, dođi mi (Come to me and Go from me, 1983)
- Šta se zgodi kad se ljubav rodi (What Happens When Love Comes to Town, 1984)
- Žikina dinastija (Žika's Dynasty, 1985)
- Druga Žikina dinastija (Second Žika's Dynasty, 1986)
- Treća Žikina Dinastija (, Third Zika's Dynasty 1988)
- Žikina ženidba (Žika's Wedding, 1992), also known as Ženidba Žike Pavlovića (The Wedding of Žika Pavlović) in Croatia
- Povratak Žikine dinastije (Žika's Dynasty Returns, 2025)
