= Marko Todorović =

Marko Todorović may refer to:

- Marko Todorović (actor) (1929–2000), Serbian actor
- Marko Todorović (basketball) (born 1992), Montenegrin professional basketball player
- Marko Todorović (revolutionary) (1780–1823), on the List of Serbian Revolutionaries
