= Yablans =

Yablans is a surname. Notable people with the surname include:

- Frank Yablans (1935–2014), American studio executive, film producer, and screenwriter
- Irwin Yablans (born 1934), American film producer and distributor, brother of Frank
