= Dragomir Bojanić =

Serbian actor

- Born: Dragomir Bojanić; 13 June 1933; Kragujevac, Kingdom of Yugoslavia
- Died: 11 November 1993 (aged 60); Belgrade, Serbia, FR Yugoslavia
- Other names: Anthony Ghidra
- Occupation: Actor
- Years active: 1955–1993
- Spouse(s): Ljiljana Kontić (1966–?, divorced); (?–?, divorced); (?–1993; his death)
- Children: 1

Dragomir Bojanić (Serbian Cyrillic: Драгомир Бојанић; 13 June 1933 – 11 November 1993), also known by his nickname Gidra, was a Serbian actor. In several Italian films he was credited as Anthony Ghidra.

His roles include Kondor, German secret agent in popular 1972 film Valter brani Sarajevo, and the comical role of family patriarch Žika Pavlović, which he reprised 10 times in the Lude godine series.

Gidra died in 1993 at the age of sixty.

== Theater ==
He was a member of the amateur theater "Sveta Mladenović" from which he moved to Kragujevac National Theater, of which he was a longtime member. He then enrolled Academy of Theater, Film, Radio and Television and, as a first-year student, began to play Mitke at the National Theater in the play "Kostana", playing his first major role. From 1964 to 1966, he was a member of Yugoslav Drama Theater in Belgrade.

== Personal ==
Bojanić was married to Ljiljana Kontić (7 September 1931 – 17 July 2005), also an accomplished actress. They had a tumultuous marriage, marrying 3 times and divorcing twice. After remarrying for the 3rd time, they remained married until his death. They have a daughter named Jelena.

== Selected filmography ==
Year	Title	Role	Notes
1958	The Sky Through the Trees		
1964	March on the Drina		
1965	Three		
1966	The Climber		
1967	The Last Killer		
1967	Ballad of a Gunman		
1968	May God Forgive You... But I Won't		
1968	It Rains in My Village		
1968	U raskoraku		
1968	A Hole in the Forehead		
1972	Walter Defends Sarajevo		
1984	Šta se zgodi kad se ljubav rodi		
1986	Dancing in Water		
1989	Hajde da se volimo		
