= Kevin Brophy =

American actor (1953–2024)

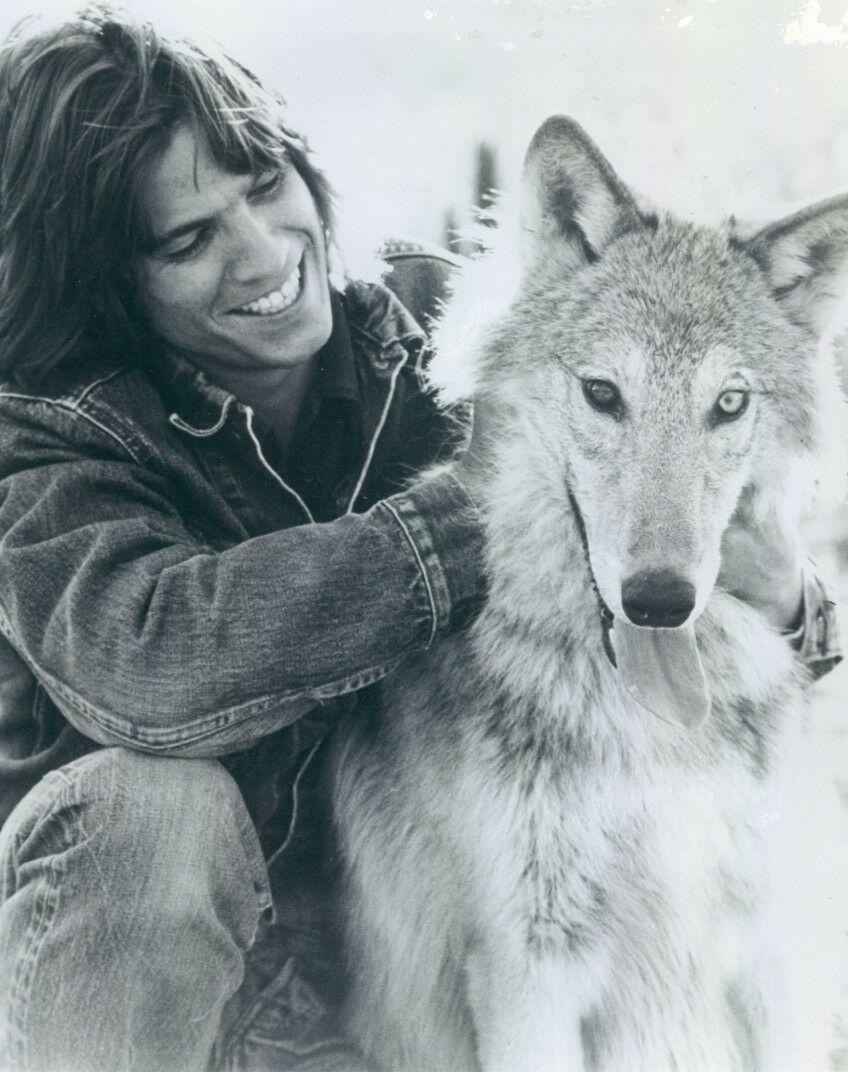
- Brophy in Lucan (1977)
- Born: November 1, 1953; Salt Lake City, Utah, U.S.
- Died: May 11, 2024 (aged 70); Rancho Santa Fe, California, U.S.
- Occupation: Actor
- Spouse: Amy Prettyman

Kevin Michael Brophy (November 1, 1953 – May 11, 2024) was an American film and television actor. He is best known for his portrayal of the title character in Lucan (1977–1978).

== Life and career ==
Brophy was born in Salt Lake City, Utah. He appeared with his wife, Amy, in the 1994 film The Magic of the Golden Bear: Goldy III.

In addition to acting, Brophy found employment as a valet who parked cars at the Hotel Bel-Air between 1983 and 2009.

Illinois-based Ray Fulk, a man who died in July 2012 at the age of 71, bequeathed half of his estate to the actor in his will, the other half going to his former Hell Night castmate and The Young and the Restless star Peter Barton, despite never meeting them. Fulk, who had no family of his own, was a fan of both actors.

On June 16, 2024, it was revealed that Brophy died on May 11, 2024, at his home in Rancho Santa Fe, California, following a 10-year battle with Stage 4 cancer. He was 70.

== Partial filmography ==
- I'm Losing You (1998) .... Conductor
- White Dwarf (1995) .... Hospital Orderly
- Shattered Image (1994) .... Second Dr. Collins
- The Magic of the Golden Bear: Goldy III (1994) .... Melvin
- Hart to Hart: Hart to Hart Returns (1993) .... West
- Fearless (1993) .... TV Reporter
- Fatal Charm (1990) .... Deputy Williams
- Code Name Vengeance (1989) .... Chuck
- Easy Wheels (1989) .... Tony Wolf
- The Delos Adventure (1987) .... Greg Bachman
- Time Walker (1982) .... Peter Sharpe
- The Seduction (1982) .... Bobby
- Hell Night (1981) .... Peter Bennett
- Trouble in High Timber Country (1980) .... Tony Aguella
- The Long Riders (1980) .... John Younger
- Lucan (1977) .... Lucan

== Selected TV guest appearances ==
- JAG
- Just the Ten of Us
- Growing Pains
- Finder of Lost Loves
- Zorro
- Matt Houston
- Trapper John, M.D.
- The Love Boat
- M*A*S*H
- The Hardy Boys Mysteries
- Star Trek: Deep Space Nine
