= Family Viewing Hour =

Defunct television policy by the Federal Communications Commission

The Family Viewing Hour was a policy established by the Federal Communications Commission (FCC) in the United States in 1975. Under the policy, each television network in the U.S. bore a responsibility to air "family-friendly" programming during the first hour of the prime-time lineup (8 to 9 p.m. Eastern Time). The policy was abandoned in 1977 following a 1976 ruling by a federal court that found it violative of the First Amendment. However, the concept has continued on a voluntary basis in various manifestations.

== Background ==
In 1974, widespread public criticism had arisen regarding the amount of sex and violence depicted on American television. One example that caused a particularly strong backlash was a lesbian rape scene during the 1974 NBC television film Born Innocent that was also briefly shown in daytime promotional spots. The scene was blamed for the real-life rape of a young girl, which led to a case before the California Supreme Court.

In January 1975, FCC chairman Richard E. Wiley addressed the Senate and House Communications and Commerce Subcommittees, stating that all three networks had agreed to adopt a "family viewing hour" in response to the criticism. The National Association of Broadcasters advanced the gesture one step further, decreeing that local stations also air family-friendly programming in the 7 p.m. time slot during which the networks were forbidden from programming under the Prime Time Access Rule.

CBS president Arthur R. Taylor wished to adopt the measure but would only agree if NBC and ABC consented, citing a possible decline in ratings if CBS were the only network to try the new policy (the network had been #1 in U.S. households since the mid-1950s). By the end of 1974, each network executive agreed to endorse the Family Viewing Hour, and to implement it by the fall 1975 season.

Many television series were affected by the Family Viewing Hour mandate. All in the Family, which had been the runaway top-rated show in the U.S. since 1971, was moved to 9 p.m. on Mondays after five seasons leading the Saturday night lineup. Producer Norman Lear, citing an infringement on creative freedom and his First Amendment rights, mounted a lawsuit. With the support of varying guilds, including that of the WGA, he won the case. The show's cast responded by recording a satirical, unaired rendition of the show's theme song retitled "These Are the Days".

On November 4, 1976, in deciding 2 lawsuits, United States district court Judge Warren J. Ferguson declared the Family Viewing Hour unconstitutional. Ferguson stated while the idea had merits, the FCC had overstepped its bounds by privately lobbying the three major networks to adopt the policy instead of holding public hearings on the matter. The decree issued by the National Association of Broadcasters in 1975 was also overturned, ruling that the NAB had done so under duress. The ruling allowed stations the freedom to program their pre-prime-time slots.

== Modern usage ==
After the Family Viewing Hour was declared unconstitutional, the networks voluntarily continued to offer family-friendly programs such as The Cosby Show and Happy Days in the early prime-time hours. In 1989, Michigan housewife Terry Rakolta started a public letter-writing campaign to persuade advertisers to stop sponsoring the Fox network sitcom Married... with Children after watching the episode "Her Cups Runneth Over" with her three young children. Consequently, two companies completely withdrew sponsorship from the show, while others, including the Coca-Cola Company, reduced sponsorship. Beginning with the 2000–2001 season, ABC stopped showing commercials for R-rated films during the first hour of primetime. In 2003, FCC commissioner Kevin Martin expressed a desire to resurrect the Family Hour.

In 2001, the Parents Television Council (PTC) issued a report titled The Sour Family Hour and campaigned for the FCC to reinstate the Family Hour on a voluntary basis. The PTC has issued numerous subsequent reports claiming that the first prime-time hour of 8:00 p.m. (7:00 p.m. in Central and Mountain Time Zones) has grown increasingly unsuitable for family viewing.

Bernard Goldberg and Zell Miller have used the term "family hour" in their books to describe the early prime-time hours.

The advent of streaming television has rendered the concept of a strictly defined "family hour" largely irrelevant, given that the technology provides consumers with each provider's full library of programming regardless of time of day.

== See also ==
- Watershed (broadcasting)
