= Goran Radaković =

Serbian actor

- Горан Радаковић
- Born: 11 July 1964 (age 61); Belgrade, SFR Yugoslavia
- Other name: Goki
- Education: Faculty of Dramatic Arts
- Alma mater: University of Arts in Belgrade
- Occupation: Actor
- Years active: 1978–present

Goran "Goki" Radaković (Serbian Cyrillic: Горан Радаковић: born 11 July 1964) is a Serbian actor. He appeared in more than fifty films since 1978.

== Selected filmography ==
Year	Title	Role	Notes
2015	Enklava		
2009	The Belgrade Phantom		
2009	Here and There		
2003	Strawberries in the Supermarket		
1998	Tri palme za dve bitange i ribicu		
1992	The Black Bomber		
1987	Oktoberfest		
1986	Dancing in Water		
