= Sarah T. – Portrait of a Teenage Alcoholic =

1975 television film directed by Richard Donner

- Written by: Richard and Esther Shapiro
- Directed by: Richard Donner
- Starring: Linda Blair; Mark Hamill; Larry Hagman; Verna Bloom; William Daniels; Michael Lerner
- Composer: James Di Pasquale
- Country of origin: United States
- Original language: English

Production
- Producer: David Levinson
- Cinematography: Gayne Rescher
- Editor: Richard Bracken
- Running time: 96 minutes
- Production company: Universal Television

Original release
- Network: NBC
- Release: February 11, 1975

Sarah T. – Portrait of a Teenage Alcoholic is a 1975 American psychological drama television film directed by Richard Donner and written by Richard and Esther Shapiro. The film stars Linda Blair as the title character Sarah Travis. It also stars Mark Hamill, Larry Hagman, Verna Bloom, and William Daniels.

== Plot ==
The movie begins with a mock TV commercial for "Coury's" beer (surprisingly like a similar-sounding Colorado brand of beer made from Rocky Mountain spring water), showing a group of young adults laughing and frolicking as they play games and drink. Then the movie segues into a voice-over with statistics on alcoholism, setting a more serious tone before the actual teleplay begins.

Sarah Travis (Linda Blair) is a 15-year-old girl dealing with feelings of isolation and inadequacy. Her parents are divorced and she has minimal contact with her unemployed, alcoholic biologic father, Jerry (played by Larry Hagman). Sarah lives with her mother Jean Hodges, and stepfather Matt, neither of whom notice how lonely Sarah is. The family has just moved to a new town in an upscale suburb. She feels overwhelmed in the new environment and overshadowed by her older sister, Nancy, and wishes to live with her biologic father. At her new school she joins a tryout for the glee club, but out of nervousness she botches the audition and leaves the room visibly upset.

Sarah attends a party hosted by her parents to celebrate her stepdad getting a big promotion. She is uncomfortable with many adults asking penetrating questions about her personal life, which she resents. Some adults ask her to take a drink, which her mother flatly refuses Sarah to do. Shortly afterward, she picks up an abandoned drink and gulps it down. This is our first realization that she is actually an experienced drinker. Some time later she attends a party for older teens from her newfound friend, Ken Newkirk (played by a pre-Star Wars Mark Hamill). She drinks at the party and soon associates happiness and belonging with drinking. She sings at the party and surprises herself and everyone by a great performance. Sarah then surreptitiously picks up bottle after bottle and becomes completely and happily drunk. Ken drives her home and her parents see her condition and wrongly blame Ken for getting her drunk. Jean is more concerned with what others think than the welfare of her daughter.

Ken invites Sarah to join him riding his horse Daisy, and Sarah becomes more popular at school. However, her home life continues to be confusing and erratic. Jean fires their housekeeper Margaret for raiding the liquor cabinet, but it was actually Sarah who was watering down the scotch to hide her drinking it. Sarah continues attending parties with Ken, and drinks heavily at them. Ken becomes concerned and calls out Sarah for her drinking, but she laughs it off, being in denial.

Sarah continues drinking, especially at school, misses classes and forges notes from her mother. The school counselor tells Jean that something is wrong in Sarah's life. The counselor characterizes Sarah as a student with a high I.Q. who once took a diligent approach to her schoolwork. Jean and her stepdad, in denial, resent the counselor's intervention and feel that Sarah is being targeted because of the divorce. None of them are aware that Sarah's alcoholism is the root cause. Sarah uses various means to secretly get hard liquor to drink. During a visit with her biological father, it is revealed that he himself has a drinking problem, which hints that Sarah has inherited her alcoholism from her dad.

Sarah confesses to Ken that she drinks to make things easier. While babysitting at a neighbor's home, she tries to contact her father by telephone with no answer, and finds alcohol in the refrigerator. She then passes out from drinking. The child's parents come home to find Sarah passed out drunk and the child crying and abandoned, resulting in a public scandal. In a confrontation with Matt and Jean, Sarah says she has been drinking almost daily for two years.

Her parents have Sarah visit with psychologist Dr. Marvin Kittredge, who fails to convince either Jean or Sarah that Sarah has a problem. On his recommendation, Sarah attends an Alcoholics Anonymous meeting where she meets Bobby, who is even younger than Sarah. What Bobby tells the group resonates with Sarah, and she recognizes herself in what Bobby says such as constant lying. But, she walks out of the meeting and continues drinking, in denial of her alcoholism.

During her family therapy sessions, Sarah expresses a desire for her family to be complete again and for her parents to stop fighting. When her biologic father Jerry says he cannot assume full custody of Sarah because of the nature of his job, Sarah again feels the irresistible urge to continue drinking. After various failed attempts to get the liquor she now desperately needs, she asks a group of rough-looking teenagers (this was at a time when the drinking age in many states was 18) to purchase vodka for her, inviting them to do "anything" to her so she could get her bottle. They tease her by a keep-away game with their own bottle, which leads Sarah to become panicked and screaming like an addict would be. It is hinted that one of the rough teens does, in fact, do the "anything" with Sarah and he then gives her the promised vodka bottle. After drinking the remaining vodka, she finds her way to the stable where Daisy is, and takes the horse for a ride without permission. Though Ken sees her taking the horse and tries to stop Sarah, she drunkenly rides off on the horse into oncoming traffic on a busy street. As a result, Daisy is hit by a car and injured. The police put down the horse off-screen, and Sarah is also thrown from the horse and injured, and is taken to the hospital,

Sarah spends time in a hospital, where she experiences an angry, violent withdrawal since she is now unable to drink. She later expresses remorse for the way she has acted. She realizes how much she has loved her family and her friends at the Alcoholics Anonymous meeting, and admits that she is an alcoholic and that things will never be the same for any of them. Her mother and stepdad try to gloss over the incident as an enabling effort, but Sarah realizes she has hit bottom and joins her fellow AA friends instead. This brings a hopeful ending that she will accept AA.

== Cast ==
- Linda Blair as Sarah Travis
- Larry Hagman as Jerry Travis
- Verna Bloom as Jean Hodges
- William Daniels as Matt Hodges
- Michael Lerner as Dr. Marvin Kittredge
- Mark Hamill as Ken Newkirk
- Eric Olson as Bobby
- Laurette Spang as Nancy Travis
- M. Emmet Walsh as Mr. Peterson
- Steve Benedict as Ray Peterson
- Richard Roat as Fred Tyler
- Marian Collier as Mrs. Peterson
- Hilda Haynes as Margaret
- Jessica Rains as Mrs. Tyler
- Sheila Larken as Vice Principal

== Release ==
Sarah T. – Portrait of a Teenage Alcoholic premiered on NBC on February 11, 1975. After its release, NBC aired several television films over the next few years under the title Portrait of a..., including:

- Dawn: Portrait of a Teenage Runaway (aired September 26, 1976, starring Eve Plumb)
- Alexander: The Other Side of Dawn (aired May 16, 1977, starring Leigh McCloskey)
- Billy: Portrait of a Street Kid (aired September 12, 1977, starring LeVar Burton)
- Sharon: Portrait of a Mistress (aired October 31, 1977, starring Trish Van Devere)
- Katie: Portrait of a Centerfold (aired October 23, 1978, starring Kim Basinger)
