= Dancing in Water =

- English-language theatrical poster
- Directed by: Jovan Aćin
- Written by: Jovan Aćin
- Produced by: Dragoljub Popović
- Starring: Gala Videnović; Relja Bašić; Marko Todorović; Miloš Žutić; Đorđe Nenadović; Nebojša Bakočević; Dragan Bjelogrlić; Srđan Todorović; Goran Radaković
- Cinematography: Tomislav Pinter
- Edited by: Snežana Ivanović
- Music by: Zoran Simjanović
- Distributed by: Orion Pictures (US)
- Release date: 1986
- Running time: 112 minutes
- Country: Yugoslavia
- Language: Serbo-Croatian

Dancing in Water (Serbo-Croatian: Bal na vodi, Бал на води) is a 1986 Yugoslavian romantic-drama film directed by Jovan Aćin. In America it frequently shows under the title Hey Babu Riba. The screenplay is by Jovan Aćin, from the memories of Petar Janković, George Zecevic and Mr. Aćin with music by Zoran Simjanović.

== Plot ==
The death of the one-time coxswain of a Yugoslav rowing crew precipitates their reunion at her funeral. They called her 'Esther' in post-war Yugoslavia a generation ago, but they haven't seen her since her father forbade contact at that time, shortly after they helped her escape Yugoslavia to re-unite with him.

Flashbacks return us to those days where they forged enduring friendships against the backdrop of the struggle between Communist and American ideals in Tito's Yugoslavia. The "four" are fascinated by American music and styles, while their rival rowing team is led by a competitor for Esther's affections, a rising member in the Communist elite who bears tattoos of Stalin and Lenin on his wrists.

Each of the four harbored a secret passion for Esther's inspiring beauty. The first modestly allows that he can't tell her what he feels. The next tempts her heart with poetry. Glenn then confesses his love in drunken confidence that he shrugs off as a joke. The last swaggers that it's obvious they are a couple and the rest will understand eventually. But Esther reminds each of them in turn that the five of them are "a four." Despite the shock when she finds herself with child by an outsider, they spirit her across the water to her father's protective embrace. Assuming their complicity in her fall from grace, he peremptorily strikes them from her life.

== Inspirations ==
Evidently part of the story is based on the life of Radomir Perica, who was jailed for flaunting a Mickey Mouse tattoo during the period of the film. The American title Hey Babu Riba has nothing to do with the original title and comes from the brief appearance in the film of a recording of Lionel Hampton's "Hey! Ba-Ba-Re-Bop".

Esther's character is an homage to Esther Williams whose music from Bathing Beauty is a main tune in the movie.

== Cast ==
- Gala Videnović - Esther
- Nebojša Bakočević - Glen
- Relja Bašić - Glen (older)
- Dragan Bjelogrlić - Sacha
- Marko Todorović - Sacha (older)
- Srđan Todorović - Kica
- Miloš Žutić - Kica (older)
- Goran Radaković - Pop
- Đorđe Nenadović - Pop (older)
- Milan Štrljić - Rile
- Dragomir Bojanić - Rile (older)
- Danica Maksimović - Rada švercerka
- Marko Nikolić - Rile (older - voice)
