= Three Palms for Two Punks and a Babe =

1998 film

- Directed by: Radivoje Andrić
- Starring: Srđan Todorović; Dubravka Mijatović
- Release date: 2 April 1998
- Running time: 103 min
- Country: Yugoslavia
- Language: Serbian

Three Palms for Two Punks and a Babe (Serbian: Tri palme za dve bitange i ribicu) is a 1998 Yugoslav comedy film directed by Radivoje Andrić.

== Cast ==
- Srđan Todorović - Lane
- Dubravka Mijatović - Nadica
- Goran Radaković - Moma
- Milorad Mandić - Terza
- Mirjana Karanović - bank director
- Gorica Popović - Nadica's aunt
- Marko Janketić - Nadica's younger brother
- Nenad Jezdić - Pendula
