= Nai Bonet =

Vietnamese dancer and actor (born 1939)

- Born: Christine Shapazian; January 6, 1939 (age 86); Saigon, Cochinchina, French Indochina (now Ho Chi Minh City, Vietnam)
- Years active: 1964–1980

Nai Bonet is a producer, screenwriter, actress, singer, and belly-dancer. Born Christine Shapazian on January 6, 1939 in Saigon, Vietnam. Bonet began her professional career at age 13, when she headlined as a belly-dancer in a show at the Flamingo Hotel in Las Vegas. She began appearing in films in 1964 (frequently portraying a belly-dancer), as well as in television, commercials, variety shows, her photos adorned several album covers and she continued to appear as a night club headliner. In 1966 she released the novelty song Jelly Belly, and she filmed a music video for the song which was featured on Scopitone video jukeboxes.

In the 1970s, Bonet decided to focus exclusively on her acting career, "But I wasn't getting anywhere in pictures," she said in 1978. After conceiving, producing and starring in two film flops (1979's Nocturna and 1980's Hoodlums), Bonet gave up her career.

== Filmography ==
Year	Title	Role	Notes
1964	Diary of a Bachelor	Bachelorette	
1965	John Goldfarb, Please Come Home!	Specialty Dancer	
1965	The Beverly Hillbillies	First Harem Girl	Episode: The Sheik
1965	Boeing Boeing	Air India Stewardess	uncredited
1966	The Spy with a Cold Nose	Belly Dancer	
1967	Devil's Angels	Tanya	
1973	Soul Hustler	Helena	
1973	The Soul of Nigger Charley	Anita	
1977	The Greatest	Suzie Gomez	
1977	Fairy Tales	Sheherazade	
1979	Nocturna	Nocturna	a.k.a. Nocturna: Granddaughter of Dracula
1980	Hoodlums	Loretta	a.k.a. Gangsters
