= Compass International Pictures =

American film company

- Industry: Film studio
- Founded: 1977; 49 years ago
- Defunct: 1981; 45 years ago (as Compass International Pictures)
- Fate: Closed
- Successor: Trancas International Films
- Key people: Irwin Yablans; Joseph Wolf; Paul Freeman; Moustapha Akkad; Malek Akkad
- Products: Halloween (1978); Roller Boogie (1979)
- Parent: Trancas International Films, Inc.
- Website: CompassPics.com

Trancas International Films, Inc. (formerly known as Compass International Pictures) is an independent American film production and distribution company founded by producers Irwin Yablans and Joseph Wolf in 1977, best known for their involvement in the production of numerous horror films between 1977 and 1981. Their first and most notable film release was Halloween in 1978 with Falcon Films. The company closed down in 1981, before re-emerging four years later under the name Trancas International Films. As of 2026, they are the copyright holders of the Halloween film series, and have produced eleven films in the series to date.

== Films released ==
=== As Compass International Pictures ===
Release date	Film	Note
October 25, 1978	Halloween	Inducted into the National Film Registry in 2006
March 1, 1979	Nocturna: Granddaughter of Dracula	
March 14, 1979	Tourist Trap	
December 19, 1979	Roller Boogie	(distributed by United Artists)
October 14, 1980	Fade to Black	with American Cinema Releasing
November 1980	The Day Time Ended	
January 23, 1981	Blood Beach	with The Jerry Gross Organization
August 7, 1981	Hell Night	

=== As Trancas International Films ===
- 1985 Appointment with Fear
- 1986 Free Ride
- 1988 Halloween 4: The Return of Michael Myers
- 1989 Halloween 5: The Revenge of Michael Myers
- 1995 Halloween: The Curse of Michael Myers
- 1998 Halloween H20: 20 Years Later
- 2002 Halloween: Resurrection
- 2007 Made in Brooklyn
- 2007 Halloween
- 2009 Halloween II
- 2014 Free Fall
- 2018 Halloween
- 2021 Halloween Kills
- 2022 Halloween Ends
