= Roller Boogie =

1979 American musical film

- Theatrical release poster
- Directed by: Mark L. Lester
- Screenplay by: Barry Schneider
- Story by: Irwin Yablans
- Produced by: Bruce Cohn Curtis
- Starring: Linda Blair; Jim Bray; Beverly Garland; Roger Perry; Jimmy Van Patten; Kimberly Beck; Sean McClory; Mark Goddard
- Cinematography: Dean Cundey
- Edited by: Byron "Buzz" Brandt; Edilberto Cruz; Edward Salier
- Music by: Craig Safan
- Production company: Compass International Pictures
- Distributed by: United Artists
- Release date: December 19, 1979
- Running time: 103 minutes
- Country: United States
- Language: English
- Budget: $1.5 million
- Box office: $13.3 million

Roller Boogie is a 1979 American teen musical exploitation film about roller disco, directed by Mark L. Lester and starring Linda Blair, Jim Bray, Beverly Garland, Roger Perry, Mark Goddard, Jimmy Van Patten, and Kimberly Beck. Set in the Venice suburb of Los Angeles at the height of the roller skating fad of the late 1970s, it follows an upper-class young woman (Blair) who falls in love with a working class skater (Bray). The two seek to thwart efforts from a powerful mobster attempting to acquire the land where a popular roller rink is located.

The film was developed by Irwin Yablans, head of Compass International Pictures, who had experienced notable commercial success with Halloween (1978), which was a major box-office hit the year prior. Filming took place in Los Angeles in the summer of 1979, and its elaborate skating sequences were choreographed by David Winters. Over 50 professional skaters were employed for the film.

Released by United Artists on December 19, 1979, Roller Boogie received mostly negative reviews from film critics, who deemed it a shallow film exploiting the trends of disco and roller skating, though it was a box office success, grossing over $13 million. In the years since its original release, the film has developed a cult following for its campy style and focus on disco and roller skating culture.

== Plot ==
Bobby James and his friends ("Phones", "Hoppy", "Gordo", and several others) skate to work on the Venice beach boardwalk. Meanwhile, in Beverly Hills, Terry Barkley, a genius flautist is also heading towards the beach in her Excalibur Phaeton automobile. She also is joined by her snobbish girlfriend Lana.

Bobby is skating on the boardwalk with a female friend when he encounters Terry, but she remains aloof and spurns his advance. They later meet at a local roller rink called Jammer's. During a near catastrophic skating incident where Bobby saves the day, she gives in. Terry wants to pay him to teach her how to skate for the Roller Disco contest. Even though they share a flirty, romantic couples skate, later on she rebuffs him yet again.

The next day has both Terry and Bobby getting flack from their respective friends and family. She has had enough and goes to the beach. She finds Bobby there, practicing a jump and turns on the charm. He shares with her his dream to become an Olympic Roller Skater. They end up making out on the beach. Bobby asks her if she is going to pay him for sex as well, which garners a mighty slap in return and she takes off.

Terry goes home and has a row with her mother. She wants to give up her dreams of playing classical flute at Juilliard School and win a roller disco contest at the beach. Her mother is shocked by this, enough so that she begins taking Valium. Terry decides to run away. The next morning, she calls and invites Bobby to breakfast where she apologizes. He wants to skate with her, but on his terms: no money; he calls the shots. Through a series of outdoor scenes, they work together to form a routine.

Jammer's is about to be sold to a ruthless mobster land developer Thatcher, who is wrangling the rink's owner, Delany. Bobby and Terry are clued into this plot and unsuccessful attempt to get her father, a lawyer, to help. While Terry is performing at a lush outdoor party, some of the young men sneak up, causing chaos. As a result, a group of distinguished guests falls into the swimming pool. This ruins the concert, as well as the party and its ceremonial cake. Terry gets reprimanded and slapped by her father for her running away, as well as for hanging out with her radical friends. The skaters find evidence, in the form of a cassette tape recording of the invalid ordeal, to kill the deal. Through a wild chase on the streets near the canal zone of Venice, they race to get it to the cops on time. They do, the mobsters are hauled off and the Boogie Contest is on. Terry and Bobby skate their routine and win.

Later on, back at the beach Terry and Bobby share a sad goodbye. Both promise to write each other as she heads off to New York City and he heads off to the Olympics.

== Cast ==
- Linda Blair as Terry Barkley
- Jim Bray as Bobby James
- Beverly Garland as Lillian Barkley
- Roger Perry as Roger Barkley
- Jimmy Van Patten as "Hoppy"
- Kimberly Beck as Lana
- Sean McClory as "Jammer" Delany
- Mark Goddard as Thatcher
- Albert Insinnia as "Gordo"
- Stoney Jackson as "Phones"
- M. G. Kelly as D.J.
- Christopher S. Nelson as Franklin
- Patrick Wright as Sergeant Danner
- Dorothy Meyer as Ada
- Shelley Golden as Mrs. Potter
- Bill Ross as Nick
- Carey Fox as Sonny
- Rick Sciacca as "Complete Control" Conway
- Nina Axelrod as Bobby's Friend
- Helanie Lembeck as "Chiquie" (uncredited)
- Lynn Herring as Featured Skater (uncredited)

== Production ==
=== Development ===
Roller Boogie was written by Barry Schneider with Irwin Yablans, who is credited with creating the story. Yablans' Compass International Pictures, founded with Joseph Wolfe, would distribute the movie. Compass International Pictures had unprecedented success the previous year with John Carpenter's slasher Halloween. In between Halloween and Roller Boogie, the company would distribute three other titles, Nocturna, Fyre and Tourist Trap, the latter the most successful of the three; Blair would go on to appear in Compass International Pictures' final film, the slasher Hell Night (1981).

In an earlier version of the script, Bobby James' primary interest was songwriting. In the movie, Bobby and friends were trying to write a new song by humming into a tape recorder. Once he meets Terry, she assists him in scoring it using her musical abilities. By the film's ending, Terry leaves for her music scholarship whilst Bobby pursues his musical career. There is no mention of the Olympics in the earlier version. Another scene that does not feature in the movie that was present in the script comes where Bobby helps Terry escape from her bedroom after she is grounded by her parents. However, this scene was shot since there are photos in various publicity items with Jim Bray peeking through a window on a ladder.

=== Casting ===
Linda Blair was cast in the lead role of Terry, and at the time had intended on moving away from the horror genre in favor of more lighthearted pictures, after her breakthrough appearance in The Exorcist (1973).

Although originally hired as a stunt double, Professional roller skater Jim Bray was cast as Bobby James, and was paid approximately $20,000 for his appearance in the film. Bray did not appear in any other films after Roller Boogie, despite achieving something of pin-up status in teen magazines largely based on his appearance in the film.

Stoney Jackson would appear in the third and final season of The White Shadow as Jesse B. Mitchell before its cancellation in 1981, and in Michael Jackson's music video "Beat It" (1983). He also appeared in Diane Lane's movie Streets of Fire (1984) as the lead singer of a doo wop group.

=== Filming ===
The film was shot in eight weeks through the summer of 1979, mostly on the Venice boardwalks but also at the nearby acclaimed Marina Del Rey skatepark, in Beverly Hills and, for the final competition sequence, at The Stardust Ballroom in Hollywood. To keep production costs low, the film was shot as a non-union feature. Producer Yablans initially secured a $400,000 budget, which ballooned to a total of $1.5 million by the time filming completed. Dean Cundey, who had filmed Halloween the previous year, served as cinematographer.

All of the skating sequences and the dancing sequences were choreographed by David Winters and were instrumental in the success of the film. Prior to the production of the picture, skating trainer Barbara Guedel tested over 300 young skaters, finally selecting fifty that would make up the skating crowds in the picture – many of whom would also feature in another skating-influenced picture, Xanadu (1980). The ensemble were then given three weeks of training before the photography began, and, at the behest of their managers/producers, the principal actors were only on roller-skates for short periods of time. However, Blair did much of her own skating for the picture. Two stunt doubles were used, one for the skating chase around the streets of Venice – Barbara Guedel would perform the trickier dancing stunts in the competition sequence. Blair would develop bursitis in her hip during the making of the picture.

== Soundtrack ==
The soundtrack of the film largely draws on the disco sound that was popular in the late 1970s. A double-LP soundtrack was issued by Casablanca Records in 1979.

Almost all of the tracks were written directly for the movie by Bob Esty and Michelle Aller. Esty/Aller had at the time recently scored a sizable hit, writing Cher's disco-single "Take Me Home". Incidentally, they produced Cher's accompanying LP of the same name, as well as the ill-fated follow-up, Prisoner. Cher would contribute one song to the Roller Boogie soundtrack – the Esty produced "Hell on Wheels", used in the opening sequence. The track originally featured on the Prisoner album, and a rare accompanying video clip featuring Cher roller-skating also appeared around the same time as the release of the movie.

The "Hell on Wheels" Japanese single includes another Prisoner album track, the 12" version of "Git Down (Guitar Groupie)", which is advertised as "Theme from Roller Boogie", but the song does not appear in the film. This single features a still of Linda Blair and Jim Bray on the cover.

The song "Lord Is It Mine", performed by Bob Esty, was originally written by Supertramp's Roger Hodgson for their LP Breakfast in America. He also performed the tracks "Summer Love", "Rollin' Up a Storm" and "Roller Boogie". The segued opening tracks of side two of the double LP, "Electronix (Roller Dancin')", and the Latin-disco instrumental "Cunga", are credited to Bob Esty and Cheeks. Craig Safan composed cues for the film's original score, but the film tends to rely on actual songs as opposed to instrumental pieces.

Along with "Hell on Wheels", the other song on the soundtrack that was previously available prior to the soundtrack release is Earth, Wind & Fire's well-known disco single, "Boogie Wonderland", featuring The Emotions. Only two songs featured in the film do not appear on the soundtrack: Jean Shy's "Night Dancer", which appears in the movie when Terry first visits the roller-disco rink. Dave Mason plays his hit from two years before the film, "We Just Disagree".

Roller Boogie

Soundtrack album by Various Artists
- Released: 1979
- Genre: Disco
- Length: 73:20
- Label: Casablanca Records
- Producer: Bob Esty

Side A:

1. "Hell on Wheels" – Cher (5:32)
2. "Good Girls" – Johnnie Coolrock (3:38)
3. "All for One, One for All" – Mavis Vegas Davis (4:20)
4. "Boogie Wonderland" – Earth Wind & Fire (4:48)

Side B:

1. "We've Got the Power" – Ron Green (5:15)
2. "Top Jammer" – Cheeks (4:12)
3. "Summer Love" – Bob Esty (3:53)
4. "Takin' My Life in My Own Hands" – Ron Green (5:25)

Side C:

1. "Electronix (Roller Dancin')" – Bob Esty & Cheeks (5:00)
2. "Cunga" – Bob Esty (4:54)
3. "Evil Man" – Mavis Vegas Davis (4:17)
4. "Lord is it Mine" – Bob Esty (4:26)

Side D:

1. "Rollin' up a Storm (The Eye of the Hurricane)" – Bob Esty (6:30)
2. "The Roller Boogie" – Bob Esty (6:09)
3. "Love Fire" – Bob Esty & Michelle Aller (4:54)

== Release ==
=== Box office ===
Roller Boogie was promoted with a lengthy trailer in the autumn of 1979, before premiering at the United Artists theater in Warner Center on December 19. The film was released in 500 theaters by United Artists on December 21. Though initial ticket sales were not as high as the film's producers anticipated, it went on to gross a total of $13.2 million at the box office, proving popular with teen audiences. Initially, Compass International Pictures planned on a sequel (to be set in Mexico—Acapulco Roller Boogie), but probably due to the end of the disco era, the idea was scrapped.

=== Critical response ===
Writing for the Santa Cruz Sentinel, critic Greg Beebe called the film a "travesty" and deemed it an exploitation film capitalizing on the trend of roller boogie disco culture. Janet Maslin of The New York Times felt it was thematically shallow, deeming it "the dopiest movie of the year".

Roger Ebert awarded the film one-and-a-half out of four stars, likening it to the beach party-themed films produced by American International Pictures: "There is a sense in which Roller Boogie comes as a refreshing surprise: I didn't think it was still possible, in the dog-eared final days of the 1970s, to have this silly, innocent, lame-brained and naive movie. I'd always thought that when Annette Funicello and Frankie Avalon grew up, that was it".

The film is listed in the Golden Raspberry Awards founder John J. B. Wilson book The Official Razzie Movie Guide as one of The 100 Most Enjoyably Bad Movies Ever Made.

On review aggregator Rotten Tomatoes, the film has a 0% rating based on 7 critical reviews.

=== Home media ===
Roller Boogie was released on DVD by MGM Home Entertainment on August 24, 2004, as a Region 1 widescreen DVD.

Roller Boogie was released on Blu-ray for the first time by Olive Films on July 7, 2015.

Roller Boogie will be released on DVD & Blu-ray on June 3, 2025 by Sandpiper Pictures.

== Legacy ==
Roller Boogie is frequently cited among a number of films in the late-1970s that capitalized on the roller boogie trend, along with films such as Skatetown, U.S.A.. It was also one of the last films made by actress Linda Blair before she appeared in a series of exploitation horror and crime films throughout the following decade.

On the review aggregator website Rotten Tomatoes, 0% of 7 critics' reviews are positive, with an average rating of 3/10. Metacritic, which uses a weighted average, assigned the film a score of 34 out of 100, based on 6 critics, indicating "generally unfavorable" reviews. Despite having a rare 0% approval rating on Rotten Tomatoes, the film has developed a loyal following and is seen as something of a time-capsule of the late 1970s and the disco era. The film is considered a cult classic.

In August 2006, fashion brand American Apparel played the movie in store windows in New York City. Matthew Swenson, the company's fashion media director, stated: "We became obsessed with that movie. On a whim, we also bought lamé fabric and turned them into leggings, and the gold and silver took off."

== See also ==
Other films released during the late 1970s disco and jukebox musical craze

- Saturday Night Fever (1977)
- Thank God It's Friday (1978)
- Sgt. Pepper's Lonely Hearts Club Band (1978)
- Skatetown, U.S.A. (1979)
- The Apple (1980)
- Xanadu (1980)
- Can't Stop the Music (1980)
- Fame (1980)
- Get Rollin' (1980), documentary

== Sources ==
- De Chirico, Millie; Murry, Quatoyiah (2022). TCM Underground: 50 Must-See Films from the World of Classic Cult and Late-Night Cinema. Philadelphia, Pennsylvania: Running Press. ISBN 978-0-762-48001-2.
- LoBrutto, Vincent (2021). The Seventies: The Decade That Changed American Film Forever. Lanham, Maryland: Rowman & Littlefield. ISBN 978-1-538-13719-2.
