= Gala Aleksić =

Serbian actress

Gala Aleksić (née Videnović; Serbian Cyrillic: Гала Виденовић Алексић; born 27 June 1969 in Serbia, Belgrade) is a Serbian actress who gained fame by appearing in some of the most popular films, TV shows, and TV commercials in the mid-1980s. She is married to TV director Vladimir Aleksić; they have two sons together, Demian and Pavle.

== Biography ==
Gala Aleksić was born in 1969 in Belgrade, where she was educated. She was named after the wife of painter Salvador Dalí. Her mother Dagmar Stojanović Videnović (1943 - 2009) was a prominent Serbian artist, academic painter/set designer, originally from Czech Republic.

She first appeared on the TV screen at the age of four. At the time, Galina's mother, Dagmar, was working as a set designer for Serbian Radio and Television. Filming a documentary about Korni grupa Gala was with her, so the director got the idea to have a little girl in the film. A few years after that, she joined the famous children's acting group of the legendary Bate Miladinovića.

Gala made her film debut at the age of twelve. After finishing primary school, she enrolled in high school, but due to numerous acting obligations, she had to study part-time. Before graduating from high school, she tried to enroll Faculty of Dramatic Arts in Belgrade. She was shortlisted, but was not accepted, believing that she was too young. Disappointed, she went to Brač, deciding never to act again, but then received an invitation to join the cast of Ball on Water. This was followed by other engagements. After several roles in the cult films of domestic cinema, Gala was predicted a brilliant career, but instead she almost completely disappeared from the screen, when she went to Malibu in 1990 in California, with the intention of studying acting and pursuing a successful international career.

When she arrived in United States, Gala lived in the house of a family friend of her parents Dan Tana, who helped her start her career and provided her with numerous castings. However, in the same year, she gave birth to a son and decided to retire from show business. In 1996, she returned to Belgrade, where she married a director and actor Vladimir Aleksić. Upon her return to Belgrade, she began to practice yoga seriously and became an international yoga instructor.

Gala Aleksic has two sons. She lives on the Malibu - Belgrade route. Occasionally accepts roles in domestic films and series and borrows a voice in the dubbing of animated films.

== Selected filmography ==
=== Film ===
Year	Title	Role	Notes
1982	Moj tata na određeno vreme	Jasna	
1984	Šta se zgodi kad se ljubav rodi	Natasha	
1985	Žikina dinastija	Natasha	
1987	Dancing in Water	Mirjana 'Ester' Živković	
1992	Happy Hell Night	Marjorie	

=== Television ===
Year	Title	Role	Notes
1987	Vuk Karadzic	Ruža Todorova	TV series
1989	Specijalna redakcija	Lili	TV series
1989–1990	Metla bez drške	Dragana	TV series
