= Lucan (American TV series) =

- Genre: Drama
- Created by: Michael Zagor
- Starring: Kevin Brophy; Don Gordon
- Country of origin: United States
- Original language: English
- No. of seasons: 2
- No. of episodes: 11

Production
- Running time: 60 minutes
- Production company: MGM Television

Original release
- Network: ABC
- Release: September 12, 1977 – December 4, 1978

Lucan is a TV drama starring Kevin Brophy that aired on ABC from 1977 to 1978. The series was based on an earlier May 22, 1977, made-for-TV movie of the same name directed by David Greene starring John Randolph and Kevin Brophy, along with Stockard Channing, Ned Beatty and Lou Frizzell.

== Synopsis ==
A 20-year-old man (Brophy) who spent the first 10 years of his life running wild in the forests of northern Minnesota, after being raised by wolves, Lucan is taken to a research institute and taught the ways of human society. He is befriended by a kind researcher, Doctor Hoagland (John Randolph), with whom he bonded during his journey to civilization. Lucan's continued freedom at the research center is put in peril once his doctor friend and mentor is hurt.

Unable to ensure Lucan's well-being at the institute, his friend encourages him to strike out on his own in search of his identity and family. The series chronicled the encounters, challenges, and intrigues Lucan faced interacting with people using his new learned social graces and old Wolfen instincts. He is also pursued by a bounty hunter, Prentiss (Don Gordon), who is hired by the university to bring him back. (The last four episodes of the series altered the premise to reveal that Lucan was actually on the run from the police for a crime he didn't commit. Prentiss was made a police lieutenant charged with bringing Lucan in for trial for a murder case.)

As well as being unusually strong and agile, Lucan also possessed special wolfen skills that appeared in emergency situations. When upset to the point of violence, his eyes glowed amber. He also had heightened senses of smell and hearing. In a few episodes, he was able to call on his old wolf family/pack for help.

== Episodes ==
=== Season 1 (1977) ===
No. overall	No. in season	Title	Directed by	Written by	Original release date
0	0	"Pilot"	David Greene	Michael Zagor	May 22, 1977
1	1	"Listen to the Heart Beat"	Peter H. Hunt	Camille Marchetta and Rick Edelstein	September 12, 1977
2	2	"The Search"	Robert Day	Tony Kayden	December 26, 1977
3	3	"The Lost Boy"	Sutton Roley	David Westheimer	January 2, 1978
4	4	"How Do You Run Forever?"	Barry Shear	Story by : Elliot West; Teleplay by : Elliot West & Robert Specht	January 9, 1978
5	5	"One Punch Wolfson"	Sutton Roley	Tony Kayden	January 16, 1978
6	6	"You Can't Have My Baby"	Corey Allen	Mann Rubin	March 13, 1978
7	7	"The Pariah"	Curtis Harrington	Steven E. de Souza	March 27, 1978

=== Season 2 (1978) ===
No. overall	No. in season	Title	Directed by	Written by	Original release date
8	1	"Nightmare"	Georg Stanford Brown	Larry Alexander & Sidney Ellis	November 13, 1978
9	2	"Brother Wolf"	Joseph Pevney	Sidney Ellis	November 20, 1978
10	3	"The Creature Beyond the Door"	Vic Morrow	Story by : Robert Specht & Larry Alexander; Teleplay by : Robert Specht	November 27, 1978
11	4	"Thunder God Gold"	Hollingsworth Morse	Casey Wilber & Margaret Stewart	December 4, 1978

== Merchandise ==
A novel based on the pilot TV-movie was released as well as a board game based on the show.

== DVD release ==
On April 3, 2018, Warner Bros. released Lucan- The Complete Series on DVD via their Warner Archive Collection. This is a manufacture-on-demand (MOD) release, available through Warner's online store.
