= Nocturna: Granddaughter of Dracula =

1979 American film about a vampire granddaughter

Nocturna
- Theatrical release poster
- Directed by: Harry Hurwitz
- Written by: Nai Bonet; Harry Hurwitz
- Produced by: Irwin Yablans; Nai Bonet; Vernon P. Becker
- Starring: John Carradine; Nai Bonet
- Cinematography: Mac Ahlberg
- Edited by: Ian Maitland
- Music by: Norman Bergen; Reid Whitelaw
- Production company: Nai Bonet Enterprises
- Distributed by: Compass International Pictures
- Release date: March 1, 1979
- Running time: 85 minutes
- Country: United States
- Language: English
- Budget: $200,000

Nocturna (more commonly referred to by its promotional title Nocturna: Granddaughter of Dracula) is a 1979 American film conceived by star Nai Bonet and written and directed by Harry Hurwitz, who was credited as "Harry Tampa". It premiered in France at the Paris Festival of Fantastic Films on March 1, 1979, to coincide with its U.S. release. The film is copyrighted 1978 in the opening and ending credits, as it was filmed in October and November 1978.

In the film, the granddaughter of Count Dracula is transformed by disco music and falls in love with a musician of the genre. She follows him to New York City, but her grandfather tries to reclaim control over the young vampiress.

== Plot ==
Transylvania, 1979: Hard times have fallen upon the House of Dracula, and to help pay the taxes on the ancestral castle, it has been converted into the Hotel Transylvania. The hotel manager is the beautiful and sensuous Nocturna, granddaughter of the original Count, who still resides in the crypt deep in the sub-basement of the establishment.

Nocturna books the American disco group Moment of Truth to entertain in the hotel's cabaret, The Claret Room, to increase business and the supply of fresh blood at the hotel. While listening to the group rehearse their music, Nocturna experiences strange sensations which she has never felt before. At the same time, she is attracted to a handsome musician in the group named Jimmy. Soon they are having a passionate love affair, but the music that plays as they have sex prevents her from making him another victim of her blood-lust. The music continues the strange transformation of Nocturna, who sees her reflected image for the first time while dancing. Deeply in love with Jimmy, she disregards grandfather Dracula's advice and runs away to America with him.

When they arrive in New York City, she leaves the disappointed Jimmy and seeks out the crypt of Jugulia Vein, an old love of Count Dracula's, who lives underneath the Brooklyn Bridge. Nocturna goes to a disco to meet Jimmy, where she is transformed again by the soul-stirring powers of the music. All the other dancers join them in a fantastic erotic dance.

Meanwhile, back at Jugulia's crypt, Count Dracula has appeared with his henchman Theodore, and has placed Jugulia under a spell forcing her to disclose the whereabouts of Jimmy's apartment. He orders his henchman to bring back Nocturna and do as he wishes with her human lover. Theodore, who is hopelessly in love with Nocturna, captures her and brings her back to Jimmy's apartment tied inside a black bag. Theodore is about to take Jimmy's blood when Nocturna manages to rip through the bag, bare her fangs, and pounce upon the cringing Theodore.

Theodore drags his broken body back to Jugulia's crypt and informs his master that he has failed. Jugulia leads them to the disco, hoping to change Count Dracula's mind when he sees how happy his granddaughter is. However, the Count is infuriated when he sees Nocturna dancing with Jimmy. He places Jimmy under his evil spell, as well as all of the dancers in the disco. Nocturna agrees to leave with her grandfather and return to Transylvania to save her lover's life.

Jugulia, a romantic at heart, releases Jimmy from his trance. He is determined to risk his life to save Nocturna and rushes out of the disco. Before Count Dracula can destroy him, he rips an electrically lit "T" from the sign of the disco and advances towards the infamous vampire with his improvised cross. Count Dracula shrieks in horror at the sight, transforms himself into a bat and flies off to the safety of Transylvania. Jugulia, who has other plans for the Count, also transforms into a bat and flies after him.

Nocturna feels that she is human now and decides to watch the sunrise for the first time. Although they both realize it may mean her death, they stand in each other's arms, awaiting the first rays of sunlight. The sun's rays illuminate Nocturna's anxious face. She smiles a warm human smile at Jimmy, and they tenderly kiss.

== Principal cast ==
- Yvonne De Carlo as Jugulia Vein
- John Carradine as Count Dracula
- Nai Bonet as Nocturna
- Antony Hamilton as Jimmy
- Brother Theodore as Theodore
- Sy Richardson as RH Factor

== Soundtrack ==
The MCA double album soundtrack featured songs recorded by Gloria Gaynor, Vicki Sue Robinson and Moment of Truth.

== See also ==
- Vampire films
- Hotel Transylvania
