= Linda Blair =

American actress and activist (born 1959)

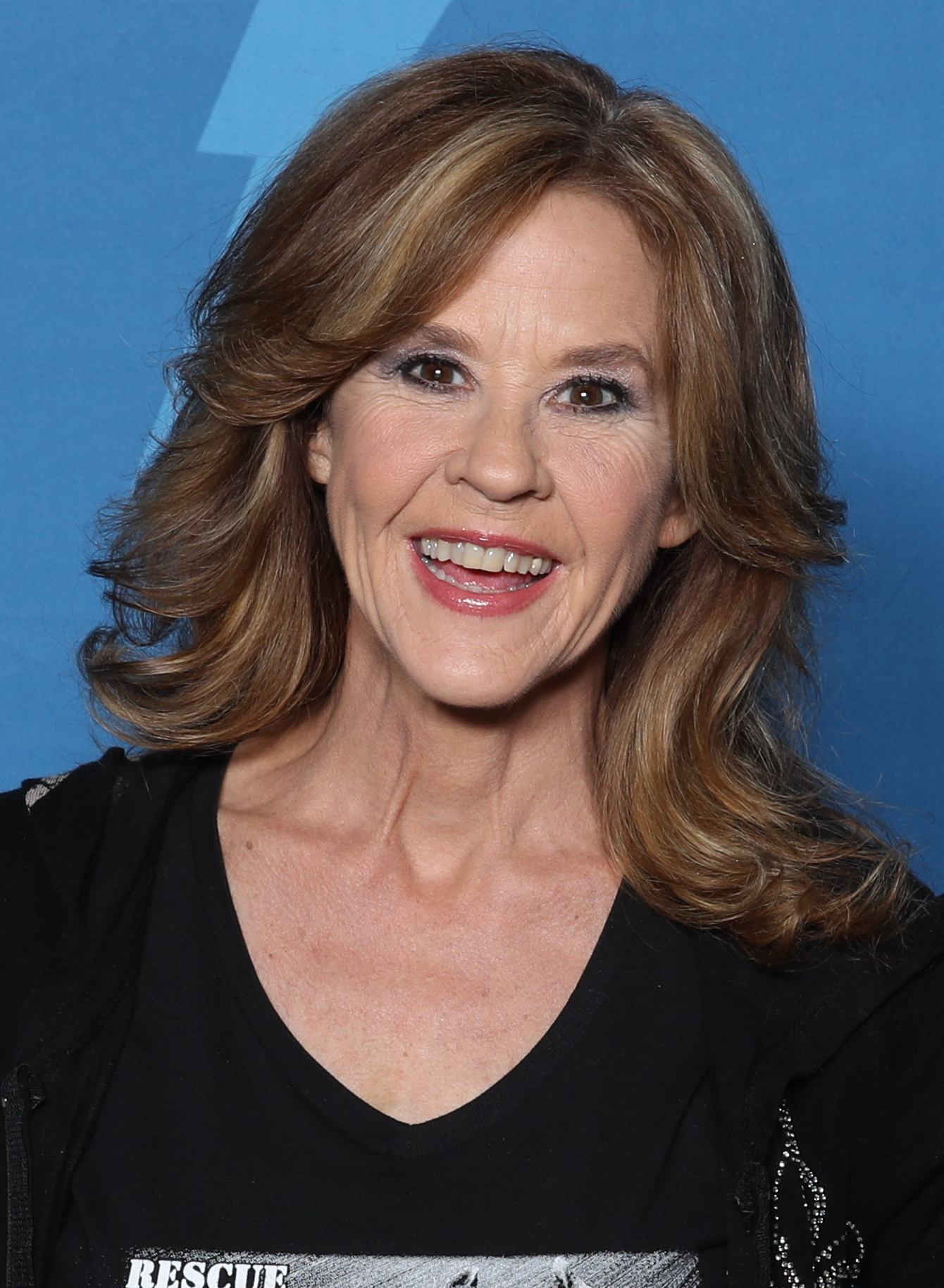
- Blair in 2018
- Born: Linda Denise Blair; January 22, 1959 (age 67); St. Louis, Missouri, U.S.
- Occupations: Actress; activist
- Years active: 1968–present
- Organization: Linda Blair WorldHeart Foundation
- Website: lindablair.com

Linda Denise Blair (born January 22, 1959) is an American actress and activist. She is known for playing Regan MacNeil in the horror film The Exorcist (1973), which established her as a prominent figure in horror popular culture. Her performance netted her a Golden Globe and a nomination for the Academy Award for Best Supporting Actress. She reprised the role in two sequels: Exorcist II: The Heretic (1977) and The Exorcist: Believer (2023).

Blair starred in several television films, including Born Innocent (1974), Sarah T. – Portrait of a Teenage Alcoholic (1975), and Stranger in Our House (1978). After her role in the musical film Roller Boogie (1979) brought her renewed recognition as a sex symbol, she starred in exploitation and grindhouse films including Hell Night (1981), Chained Heat (1983), and Savage Streets (1984). On television, she was the host of the Fox Family reality series Scariest Places on Earth (2000–2006) and made appearances on the Animal Planet series Pit Boss (2010–2012).

Blair gradually shifted her focus from acting to becoming a prominent activist for the animal rights movement. In 2004, she founded the Linda Blair WorldHeart Foundation, a non-profit organization that works to rehabilitate and adopt rescue animals.

== Early life ==
Linda Denise Blair was born on January 22, 1959, in St. Louis, Missouri, to James Frederick and Elinore (née Leitch) Blair. Blair is of Scottish ancestry. She has an older sister, Debbie, and an older brother, Jim. When Linda was two years old, her father, a Navy test pilot-turned-executive recruiter, took a job in New York City, and the family relocated to Westport, Connecticut. Her mother worked as a real-estate agent in Westport. Linda worked as a child model at age five, appearing in Sears, JCPenney and Macy's catalogues, and in over 70 commercials for Welch's grape jams and various other companies. She secured a contract at age six for a series of print advertisements in The New York Times. At the same age, she began riding horses, later becoming a trained equestrian.

== Career ==
Blair started acting with a regular role on the short-lived Hidden Faces (1968–69) daytime soap opera. Her first theatrical film appearance was in The Way We Live Now (1970), followed by a bit part in the comedy The Sporting Club (1971). In 1972, She was selected from a field of 600 applicants for her most notable role as Regan, the possessed daughter of a famous actress, in William Friedkin's The Exorcist (1973). The role earned her a Golden Globe for Best Supporting Actress, and an Academy Award nomination for Best Supporting Actress. Film critic and historian Mark Clark notes that in her performance, "Blair matches [adult co-star] Ellen Burstyn note-for-note." Despite the film's critical successes, Blair received media scrutiny for her role in the film, which was deemed by some as "blasphemous", and she has said the film had significant impact on her life and career. After the film's premiere in December 1973, some reporters speculated about Blair's mental state, suggesting the filming process had resulted in her having a mental breakdown, which she denied, and she later received anonymous death threats. To combat the rumors and news media speculation surrounding her, Warner Bros. sent the then-14-year-old Blair on an international press tour in hopes of demonstrating that she was "just a normal teenager".

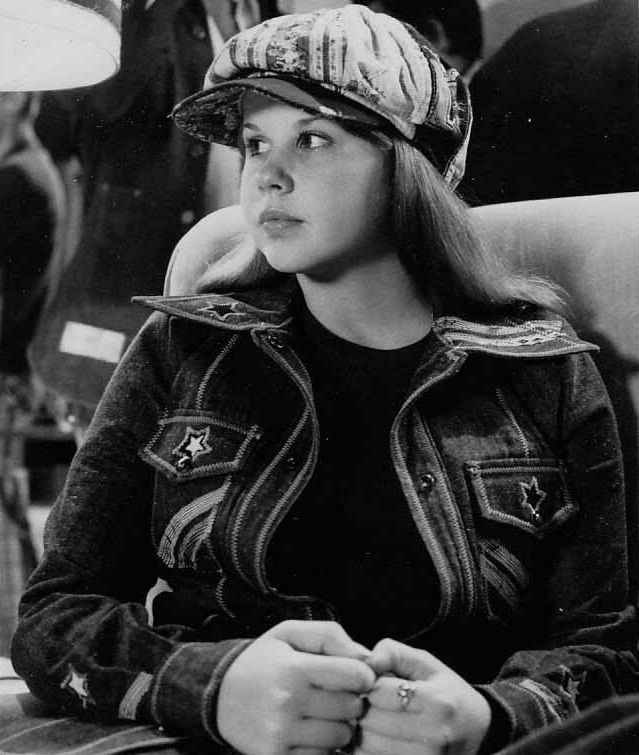
Blair in a publicity still for Sarah T. – Portrait of a Teenage Alcoholic (1975)

Blair starred opposite Kim Hunter in the controversial television film Born Innocent (1974), in which she plays a runaway teenager who is sexually abused. The film was criticized by the National Organization for Women, the New York Rape Coalition, and numerous gay and lesbian rights organizations for its depiction of female-on-female sexual abuse; the Lesbian Feminist Liberation dismissed the film, stating: "Men rape, women don't," and regarded the film as "propaganda against lesbians." After filming Born Innocent, Blair also had a supporting part as a teenaged kidney-transplant patient in the disaster film Airport 1975 (1974), which was critically panned, but a success at the box office. A steady series of job offers led her to relocate to Los Angeles in 1975, where she lived with her older sister, Debbie. Between 1975 and 1978, she had lead roles in numerous television films: Sarah T. – Portrait of a Teenage Alcoholic (1975), as a teenager who becomes addicted to alcohol; Sweet Hostage (1975) opposite Martin Sheen, in which she plays a kidnapping victim; and Victory at Entebbe (1976), a dramatization of a real-life hostage situation starring Anthony Hopkins and Elizabeth Taylor.

In 1977, Blair reprised her role as Regan in the Exorcist sequel, Exorcist II: The Heretic (1977), garnering a Saturn Award nomination for Best Actress of 1978. The film was a critical failure despite earning 30.7 million at the box office, however, and at the time was the most expensive film ever made by Warner Bros. Studios. After filming Exorcist II: The Heretic, she took a year off from acting and competed in national equestrian circuits under the pseudonym Martha McDonald. In 1978, she made a return to acting in the Wes Craven-directed television horror film Stranger in Our House (retitled Summer of Fear), based on the novel by Lois Duncan, and also with the lead role in the Canadian production Wild Horse Hank, in which she used her equestrian skills to play a college student saving wild horses from ranchers.

Blair's career took a new turn in 1979 with her starring role in the musical drama Roller Boogie, which established her as a sex symbol. The following year, she co-starred with Dirk Benedict in Ruckus, playing a young woman who helps a maligned Vietnam veteran evade antagonistic locals in a small town. She also starred in a number of financially successful low-budget horror and exploitation films throughout much of the 1980s. She starred opposite Peter Barton and Vincent Van Patten in the slasher film Hell Night (1981), followed by roles in the women-in-prison film Chained Heat (1983), playing a teenager in a women's prison, and the exploitation thriller Savage Streets (1984), in which she played the leader of a female vigilante street gang who target male rapists. In a review of Savage Streets published by TV Guide, her performance was deemed "her best since The Exorcist (1973)... and that's not saying much." Also in 1983, Blair posed nude in an issue of Playboy. In 1985, she starred again in another women-in-prison feature titled Red Heat, playing a prisoner of war in West Germany. This was followed by a lead in the direct-to-video film Night Force (1985), in which she portrayed a woman who travels to Mexico to save her friend from terrorists.

The era of her career between 1980 and 1985 was marked by some critical backlash, with Blair earning a total of five Razzie Award nominations and being awarded two Razzies for Worst Actress. In the late 1980s, she worked in numerous low-budget horror films, including Grotesque (1988), opposite Tab Hunter, and the Italian production Witchery (1988), opposite David Hasselhoff. The following year, she starred in the romantic comedy Up Your Alley opposite Murray Langston, and the Exorcist spoof Repossessed in 1990, co-starring Leslie Nielsen. She also appeared in several Australian B-movies in the early 1990s, including Fatal Bond (1991) and Dead Sleep (1992).

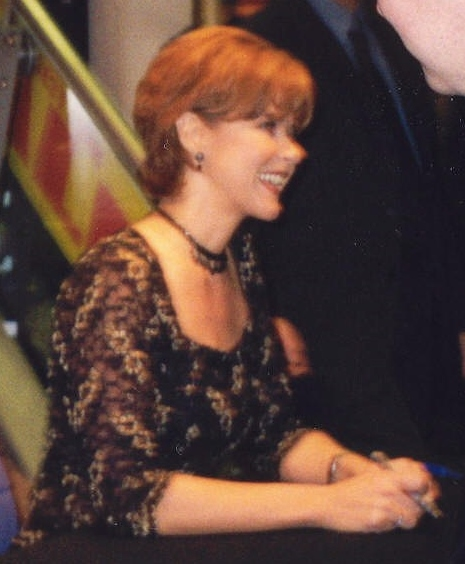
Blair in 1999

In 1996, Blair reunited with director Wes Craven for a cameo role as a reporter in Scream (1996), In 1997 she starred in a Broadway revival of Grease, playing Rizzo. Also in 1997, she appeared in a documentary for Channel 4 in the United Kingdom entitled Didn't You Used to be Satan?, which served as a biography of her life to that point and how the film The Exorcist had dominated her career and life. she appeared in critic Mark Kermode's 1998 BBC documentary The Fear of God (which Kermode directed and hosted), included as a special feature on the DVD of The Exorcist. In 1999, she appeared in an online parody of The Blair Witch Project titled The Blair Bitch Project.

In 2000, she was cast as a regular in the BBC television show, L.A. 7, and between 2001 and 2003, hosted Fox Family's Scariest Places on Earth, a reality series profiling reportedly haunted locations throughout the world.

In 2006, she guest-starred on The CW television series Supernatural, playing the part of Detective Diana Ballard, as she aids Sam and Dean Winchester in the episode "The Usual Suspects", which aired November 9, 2006. In 2008, she appeared at the 18th annual Malaga Fantasy and Horror Film Festival to accept a lifetime achievement award for her work in the horror genre. She appeared the following year in the documentary Confessions of a Teenage Vigilante, discussing her role as Brenda in Savage Streets (1984). The documentary was included as a bonus feature on the 2009 DVD release of the film.

I'm proud of it ... but it has nothing to do with what I am as an adult. I think I have been extremely polite about answering questions about The Exorcist almost every single day of my life.

— Blair on her role in The Exorcist, 2006

In 2010, she appeared as herself on the cable series Pit Boss and Jury Duty. She appeared in the 2011 Rick Springfield documentary Affair of the Heart, and was a panelist in a 2011 episode of The Joy Behar Show. In late 2011, she appeared at the taped Governors Awards for the 84th Academy Awards ceremony, honoring makeup artist Dick Smith, who had created the iconic makeup for Blair in The Exorcist. In 2013, she accepted a role in the comedy web series Whoa!, and has since appeared in the 2016 feature The Green Fairy, and the films Surge of Power: Revenge of the Sequel (2016) and the upcoming Landfill (post-production).

In 2022, Blair competed in season eight of The Masked Singer as "Scarecrow", resembling a pumpkin-headed scarecrow. Before the first elimination on "Fright Night" could be announced, she interrupted Nick Cannon by declaring forfeit while claiming that her fellow contestants "Sir Bug a Boo" (who would be unmasked in the same episode to be Ray Parker Jr.) and "Snowstorm" (later unmasked in the following episode as Nikki Glaser) should face off. When unmasked, Blair praised the show and said that she wanted to talk about her animal charity, the Linda Blair WorldHeart Foundation Rescue and Wellness Center, in light of the nation's animal crisis – and to also annoy Ken Jeong, as she claimed that he annoys everyone on the show.

In October 2023, Blair reprised the role of Regan MacNeil during a cameo in The Exorcist: Believer. In January 2025, she revealed that she was working on a memoir, along with her intentions to restart her acting career.

== Charitable activities ==
Blair supports animal welfare. She was a vegetarian for 13 years, before becoming a vegan in 2001. In that year, she co-authored the book Going Vegan!. In 2004, she founded the Linda Blair WorldHeart Foundation, a nonprofit organization that works to rescue and rehabilitate abused, neglected, and mistreated animals and provide them with needed pet care.

She has also worked with People for the Ethical Treatment of Animals, Feed the Children, Variety, the Children's Charity, and other organizations, as well as advocating for teen HIV/AIDS awareness. She is on the Sea Shepherd Conservation Society operations board of advisors. In August 2005, in the aftermath of Hurricane Katrina, she travelled to Mississippi and saved 51 abandoned dogs.

== Personal life ==
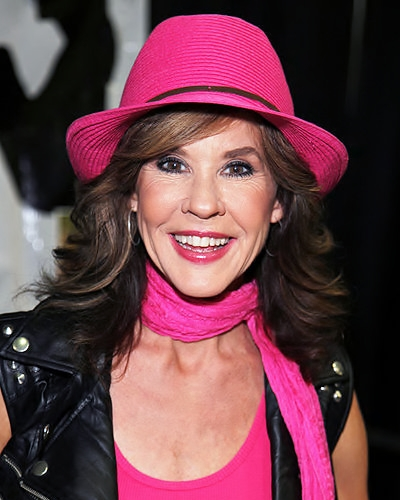
Blair in 2012

At age 15, Blair dated Australian singer Rick Springfield, 25 years old at the time, whom she met during a concert at the Whisky a Go Go. She also dated Deep Purple and Trapeze bassist Glenn Hughes, and Neil Giraldo, guitarist and future husband of Pat Benatar. Between late 1979 and mid-1981, she dated Styx guitarist Tommy Shaw. She also dated Jim Dandy Mangrum of the band Black Oak Arkansas. In the early 1990s, she was in a relationship with actor Wings Hauser.

In a 1982 interview accompanying a topless pictorial in Oui, Blair revealed that she found Rick James "very sexy". James, who was shown the piece by a member of his retinue, returned the compliment through an intermediary. They dated for two years, and James wrote his hit song "Cold Blooded" about her. Speaking on their relationship in his book Glow: The Autobiography of Rick James, he said: "Linda was incredible. A free spirit. A beautiful mind. A mind-blowing body. She liked getting high and getting down as much as I did. We posed topless for a photograph that showed up everywhere. We didn't care. We were doing our own thing our own way. It was a love affair that I hoped would last. It didn't." James revealed that he found out Blair had been pregnant by him, and had an abortion without his knowledge.

On December 20, 1977, at 18 years old, she was arrested for drug possession and conspiracy to sell drugs. She pleaded guilty to a reduced charge of conspiracy to possess cocaine, in exchange for three years' probation. She was also required to make at least twelve major public appearances to tell young people about the dangers of drug abuse.

She believes in the paranormal.

In 2014, Blair revealed that she was treated for an umbilical hernia. As of 2015, she lived in Coto de Caza, California.

In a December 2025 interview with Billy Corgan, Blair stated that she had been diagnosed with Graves' disease in 2023, after experiencing numerous symptoms which were discovered to be stemming from a near-fatal thyroid storm.

In August 2026, Los Angeles County officials executed an inspection warrant at Blair's Southern California property as part of an investigation into a reported kennel operation; Blair said the visit concerned administrative paperwork rather than the animals' welfare, and no dogs were removed.

== Filmography ==
=== Film ===
Year	Title	Role	Notes	Ref.
1970	The Way We Live Now	Sara Aldridge		
1971	The Sporting Club	Barby		
1973	The Exorcist	Regan MacNeil		
1974	Airport 1975	Janice Abbott		
1974	Born Innocent	Chris Parker	Television film	
1975	Sarah T. – Portrait of a Teenage Alcoholic	Sarah Travis	Television film	
1975	Sweet Hostage	Doris Mae Withers	Television film	
1976	Victory at Entebbe	Chana Vilnofsky	Television film	
1977	Exorcist II: The Heretic	Regan MacNeil		
1978	Stranger in Our House	Rachel Bryant	Television film; also known as: Summer of Fear	
1979	Wild Horse Hank	Hank Bradford		
1979	Roller Boogie	Terry Barkley		
1980	Ruckus	Jenny Bellows		
1981	Hell Night	Marti Gaines		
1983	Chained Heat	Carol Henderson		
1984	Night Patrol	Officer Sue Perman		
1984	Savage Streets	Brenda		
1984	Terror in the Aisles	Regan MacNeil	Archive footage	
1985	Red Heat	Christine Carlson		
1985	Savage Island	Daly		
1987	SFX Retaliator	Doris	Also known as: The Heroin Deal	
1987	Nightforce	Carla		
1988	Moving Target	Sally Tyler		
1988	Grotesque	Lisa		
1988	Silent Assassins	Sara		
1988	Bad Blood	Evie Barners		
1988	Witchery	Jane Brooks		
1989	Up Your Alley	Vickie Adderly		
1989	The Chilling	Mary Hampton	Also known as: Gamma 693	
1989	Aunt Millie's Will	Unknown	Short film	
1989	W.B., Blue and the Bean	Annette Ridgeway	Also known as: Bailout	
1989	Linda Blair’s How To Get Revenge	Herself	Direct to VHS film	
1989	Bedroom Eyes II	Sophie Stevens		
1990	Zapped Again!	Miss Mitchell		
1990	Repossessed	Nancy Aglet		
1990	Dead Sleep	Maggie Healey		
1991	Fatal Bond	Leonie Stevens		
1992	Calendar Girl, Cop, Killer?: The Bambi Bembenek Story	Jane Mder	Television film	
1992	Perry Mason: The Case of the Heartbroken Bride	Hannah Hawkes	Television film	
1993	Phone	Unknown	Short film	
1994	Skins	Maggie Joiner		
1994	Double Blast	Claudia	Television film	
1995	Sorceress	Amelia Reynolds		
1996	Prey of the Jaguar	Cody Johnson		
1996	Scream	Obnoxious Reporter	Uncredited	
1997	Marina	Marina	Short film	
2003	Monster Makers	Shelly Stoker	Television film	
2005	Diva Dog: Pit Bull on Wheels	Unknown	Short film	
2005	Hitters Anonymous	Brenda		
2006	All Is Normal	Barbara		
2006	The Powder Puff Principle	School Board President	Short film	
2009	IMPS*	Jamie	Filmed in 1983	
2012	An Affair of the Heart	Herself	Documentary film	
2016	Surge of Power: Revenge of the Sequel	Helen Harris		
2021	Landfill	Detective Karen Atwood		
2023	The Exorcist: Believer	Regan MacNeil	Cameo	
2025	Boorman and the Devil	Herself	Documentary film	

=== Television ===
Year	Title	Role	Notes	Ref.
1968–1969	Hidden Faces	Allyn Jaffe	Unknown episodes	
1974	What's My Line?	Herself	Mystery Guest	
1982	Fantasy Island	Sarah Jean Rollings	Episode:"King Arthur in Mr. Rourke's Court"	
1982	The Love Boat	Muffy	Episode: "Isaac Gets Physical"	
1985	Murder, She Wrote	Jane Pascal	Episode: "Murder Takes the Bus"	
1989	Monsters	La Strega	Episode: "La Strega"	
1990	MacGyver	Jenny Larson	Episode: "Jenny's Chance"	
1992	Married... with Children	Ida Mae	Episode: "The Magnificent Seven"	
1994	Robins Hood's	Carla Patelle	Episode: "Old Friends, Dead Ends"	
1996	Renegade	Teddy Rae Thompson	Episode: "Self Defense"	
1998	Psi Factor: Chronicles of the Paranormal	Rebecca Royce	Episode: "All Hallow's Eve"	
1999	Godzilla: The Series	Alexandra Springer	Voice role; Episode: "S.C.A.L.E."	
2000	L.A. 7	Joni Witherspoon	9 episodes	
2000	Artistic Differences	Joni Witherspoon	TV special	
2000-2007	Whimsy Rabbit's Neighborhood	Mom Rabbit	Main role, 89 episodes	
2000–2003	Hollywood Squares	Herself	10 episodes	
2001–2006	Scariest Places on Earth	Herself / Host	41 episodes	
2001	Intimate Portrait	Herself	1 episode	
2002	History's Mysteries	Herself	2 episodes	
2006	Supernatural	Detective Diana Ballard	Episode: "The Usual Suspects"	
2010–2012	Pit Boss	Herself	12 episodes	
2012	Celebrity Ghost Stories	Herself	1 episode	
2013	Battling Darkness	Herself	TV documentary	
2014	RuPaul's Drag Race	Herself	Episode: "Scream Queens"	
2018	Eli Roth's History of Horror	Herself	1 episode	
2018	American Rescue Dog Show	Herself	Guest judge	
2019	E! True Hollywood Story	Herself	Episode: "Horror Movies: Cursed or Coincidence?"	
2020	JJ Villard's Fairy Tales	Various	Voice roles; 2 episodes	
2020	Cursed Films	Herself	Episode: "The Exorcist"	
2022	The Masked Singer	Herself/Scarecrow	Season 8 contestant	

== Awards and nominations ==
List of awards and nominations received by Linda Blair
Organization	Year (Note: Year in which awards ceremony was held.)	Work(s)	Category	Result
Academy Awards	1974	The Exorcist	Best Supporting Actress	Nominated
Golden Globe Awards	1974	The Exorcist	Best Supporting Actress – Motion Picture	Won
Golden Globe Awards	1974	The Exorcist	New Star of the Year – Actress	Nominated
Golden Raspberry Awards	1982	Hell Night	Worst Actress	Nominated
Golden Raspberry Awards	1984	Chained Heat	Worst Actress	Nominated
Golden Raspberry Awards	1985	Herself	Worst Career Achievement Award	Won
Golden Raspberry Awards	1986	Night Patrol	Worst Actress	Won
Golden Raspberry Awards	1986	Savage Island	Worst Actress	Won
Golden Raspberry Awards	1986	Savage Streets	Worst Actress	Won
Joe Bob Briggs LifeTime Achievement Awards	1991	Herself	Horror	Won

== See also ==
- List of animal rights advocates

== Works cited ==
- Lee, Jason (2017). "The Devil You Don't Know?: The rise and fall and rise of Linda Blair". In O'Connor, Jane; Mercer, John (eds.). Childhood and Celebrity. Taylor & Francis. ISBN 978-1-317-51895-2.
- Walters, Suzanna Danuta (2010). "The (R)evolution of Women-In-Prison Films". In McCaughey, Martha; King, Neal (eds.). Reel Knockouts: Violent Women in Film. University of Texas Press. pp. 104–123. ISBN 978-0-292-77837-5.
- Levine, Elana (2007). Wallowing in Sex: The New Sexual Culture of 1970s American Television. Duke University Press. ISBN 978-0-822-33919-9.
- Weldon, Michael (1996). The Psychotronic Video Guide to Film. Macmillan. ISBN 978-0-312-13149-4.
- Young, R.G., ed. (2000). The Encyclopedia of Fantastic Film: Ali Baba to Zombies. Hal Leonard Corporation. ISBN 978-1-557-83269-6.
