= Šta se zgodi kad se ljubav rodi =

- Directed by: Zoran Čalić
- Starring: Dragomir Bojanić; Marko Todorović
- Music by: Zoran Simjanović
- Release date: 28 June 1984
- Running time: 103 min
- Country: Yugoslavia
- Language: Serbo-Croatian

Šta se zgodi kad se ljubav rodi is a 1984 Yugoslav comedy film directed by Zoran Čalić.

== Cast ==
- Dragomir Bojanić – Žika
- Marko Todorović – Milan
- Vladimir Petrović – Boba
- Rialda Kadrić – Marija
- Nikola Kojo – Miša
- Gala Videnović – Nataša
- Jelena Žigon – Jelena
- Ljiljana Janković – Vuka
- Ljudmila Lisina – Nataša's mother
- Branko Đurić – Nataša's father
