= Born Innocent (film) =

1974 American television movie directed by Donald Wrye

- DVD cover
- Genre: Drama
- Based on: Born Innocent by Creighton Brown Burnham
- Teleplay by: Gerald Di Pego
- Directed by: Donald Wrye
- Starring: Linda Blair; Joanna Miles; Allyn Ann McLerie; Richard Jaeckel; Kim Hunter
- Theme music composer: Fred Karlin
- Country of origin: United States
- Original language: English

Production
- Executive producers: Robert W. Christiansen; Rick Rosenberg
- Producer: Bruce Cohn Curtis
- Production locations: Albuquerque, New Mexico; Algodones, New Mexico
- Cinematography: David M. Walsh
- Editor: Maury Winetrobe
- Running time: 98 minutes
- Production company: Tomorrow Entertainment

Original release
- Network: NBC
- Release: September 10, 1974

Born Innocent is a 1974 American made-for-television drama film which was first aired under the NBC World Premiere Movie umbrella on September 10, 1974. Highly publicized and controversial, Born Innocent was the highest-rated television movie to air in the United States in 1974. The movie deals with the physical, psychological and sexual abuse of a teenage girl, and included graphic content never before seen on American television.

== Plot ==
Christine "Chris" Parker is a 14-year-old runaway who, after getting arrested many times, is sentenced to spend time in a girls' juvenile detention center. It is revealed that Chris comes from an abusive home. Her father beats her on a regular basis, which leads to her repeated flights from home. Her mother is unfeeling, sitting in her recliner, watching television and smoking cigarettes all day, and in complete denial as to what her husband is doing. Chris' older brother Tom is aware of the abuse, but he is unable to help Chris, as he is absorbed with the care of his own family.

Chris' social worker Emma Lasko never realizes that her dysfunctional parents are the cause of her troubles, and the juvenile justice system places the blame for her troubles on Chris herself. With the exception of one dedicated counselor named Barbara Clark (Joanna Miles), the reform school personnel are mostly apathetic and allow an unhealthy, destructive culture to fester. Despite Barbara's attempts to help Christine talk about her problems, Chris refuses to open up to her or anyone else about her abuse.

After Chris is attacked in the shower and sexually assaulted by her fellow inmates, as well as witnessing a pregnant resident whom Chris befriends suffer a miscarriage while in isolation, and the pervasive indifference of the staff, Chris – feeling abandoned by the system in addition to her family – becomes angry, cold and bitter. When an argument between Chris and Ms. Lasko turns physical, a riot ensues. Chris is investigated for causing the riot. She calmly maintains that she had nothing to do with it. In the final shot, Barbara looks on helplessly as she sees Chris, an innocent, intelligent, decent girl, transformed into a violent, pathological, manipulative, vengeful and cold person, devoid of guilt or remorse for her actions, who is destined to become a criminal adult when released upon reaching legal age.

== Cast ==
- Linda Blair as Chris Parker
- Joanna Miles as Counselor Barbara Clark
- Allyn Ann McLerie as Emma Lasko
- Mary Murphy as Miss Murphy
- Janit Baldwin as Denny
- Nora Heflin as Moco
- Tina Andrews as Josie
- Sandra Ego as Janet
- Mitch Vogel as Tom Parker
- Richard Jaeckel as Mr. Parker
- Kim Hunter as Mrs. Parker
- Adrienne White as Ria
- Janice Lorraine Garcia as Child at funeral

== Controversial rape scene ==
The original cut of Born Innocent contained a scene where several girls, led by Moco (Nora Heflin) and Denny (Janit Baldwin), use a plunger handle to rape Chris in the communal showers.

Born Innocent is credited with being one of the catalysts for the National Association of Broadcasters creating a Family Viewing Hour policy the following year. University of Wisconsin–Milwaukee educator Elena Levine pointed out that the film was advertised in The New York Times alongside the television show Born Free, which she theorized may have encouraged viewers to believe the film to be family friendly.

The film made several negative references to lesbianism. One version of the script implied that the character Moco's lesbianism was a result of her surroundings and prompted her abuse of Chris and others.

The film was criticized by the National Organization for Women, the New York Rape Coalition, and numerous gay and lesbian rights organizations for its depiction of female-on-female sexual abuse; the Lesbian Feminist Liberation organization dismissed the film, stating: "Men rape, women don't," and regarded the film as "propaganda against lesbians." The shower scene was eventually cut from the film due to multiple complaints.

=== Lawsuit over copycat crime ===
The film was blamed for the rape of a nine-year-old child at Baker Beach, San Francisco, by some of her peers using a glass soda bottle. Valeria Niemi, the victim's mother, sued NBC and asked for damages up to $11 million. Her lawsuit cited the facts that one of the perpetrators, Sharon Smith (the only one jailed for the attack, having been sentenced to three years in a federal prison), evoked the movie when she was arrested, and that William Thomas, 14, the boy who provided the bottle, asked if it would be "like it was done in the picture". Two other girls, 10 and 15, and the boy who served as lookout saw charges dropped. In 1981, the California Supreme Court ruled the film was not obscene, and that the NBC network was not liable for the actions of the persons who committed the crime.

=== Effect on rape awareness ===
Blair cited what she felt was one positive outcome of the film, saying that she thought it made it easier for rape survivors to come forward.

== Subsequent airing ==
In a response to the incident, re-airings in the late 1970s and 1980s did not air any of the rape sequence. The California rape influenced the establishment of the Family Viewing Hour which became briefly mandatory for the networks in the late 1970s, as the movie's first hour was aired from 8 to 9 PM Eastern Time, when some children may not have been in bed.

== Home media ==
After the edited re-airings in the 1980s, the uncut version appeared on VHS in numerous budget-priced editions. In 2004, VCI Entertainment released Born Innocent on DVD with the rape scene included. More recently, a remastered version of the unedited version is available through Amazon Prime Video.

== See also ==
- List of American films of 1974
