= Marko Todorović (actor) =

Serbian actor

- Марко Тодоровић
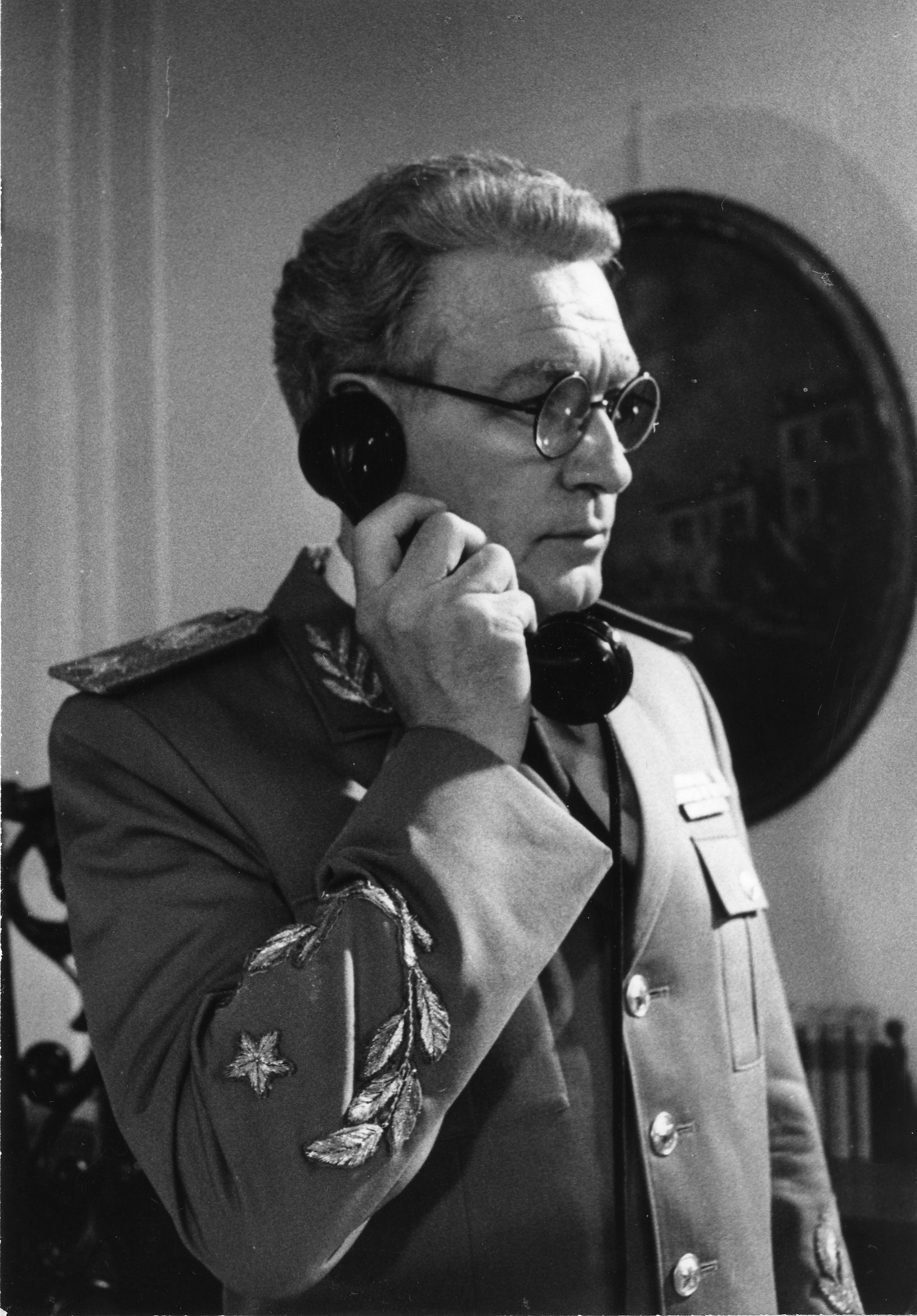
- Marko Todorović as Tito in TV series Odlazak ratnika, povratak maršala
- Born: 2 June 1929; Lajkovac, Bogovađa, Kingdom of Serbs, Croats, and Slovenes
- Died: 29 August 2000 (aged 71); Belgrade, FR Yugoslavia
- Occupation: Actor
- Years active: 1953–1995
- Height: 1.81 m (5 ft 11 in)

Marko Todorović (Serbian Cyrillic: Марко Тодоровић: 2 June 1929 – 29 August 2000) was a Serbian actor, famous for playing roles of important historical figures. Among those the best known is Tito whom he played in the 1974 spectacle The Republic of Užice, and later in a series of television docudramas directed by Sava Mrmak.

He is, however, best known for the comical role of family patriarch Milan Todorović in the Lude godine series of films.

== Selected filmography ==
| Year | Title | Role | Notes |
|---|---|---|---|
| 1974 | The Republic of Užice | Josip Broz Tito | |
| 1984 | Šta se zgodi kad se ljubav rodi | Milan Todorović | |
| 1986 | Dancing in Water | Old Saša | |
