= Hell Night =

1981 American slasher film by Tom DeSimone

- Original theatrical poster
- Directed by: Tom DeSimone
- Written by: Randy Feldman
- Produced by: Irwin Yablans; Bruce Cohn Curtis
- Starring: Linda Blair; Vincent Van Patten; Kevin Brophy; Jenny Neumann; Suki Goodwin; Jimmy Sturtevent; Peter Barton
- Cinematography: Mac Ahlberg
- Edited by: Anthony DiMarco
- Music by: Dan Wyman
- Production companies: BLT Productions, Inc.
- Distributed by: Compass International Pictures
- Release date: August 7, 1981
- Running time: 102 minutes
- Country: United States
- Language: English
- Budget: $1.4 million
- Box office: $5.3 million

Hell Night is a 1981 American supernatural slasher film directed by Tom DeSimone, and starring Linda Blair, Vincent Van Patten, Kevin Brophy, and Peter Barton. The film depicts a night of fraternity hazing set in an old manor—the site of a familial mass murder—during which a deformed killer terrorizes and murders many of the college students. The plot blends elements of slasher films and Gothic haunted house films. Filmmaker Chuck Russell served as an executive producer, while his long-time collaborator Frank Darabont served as a production assistant.

Hell Night was written by Randy Feldman, then a recent college graduate who shopped the spec script to several film studios, among them Irwin Yablans's Compass International Pictures. Producer Bruce Cohn Curtis subsequently became involved with the project and secured the lead role for Blair, with whom he had collaborated on several films, among them Roller Boogie (1979), another Compass International release. It marked the first horror film role for Blair in several years, following her performances in The Exorcist (1973) and Exorcist II: The Heretic (1977). Principal location photography of Hell Night took place in Redlands, California at the Kimberly Crest mansion in late 1980, with interior photography subsequently occurring in Los Angeles. The film was shot by Swedish cinematographer Mac Ahlberg. The production's shooting schedule was considerably tight, and required the cast and crew to shoot throughout the holiday season.

The film opened theatrically in August 1981 and was the final film released by Compass International Pictures, grossing $5.3 million against a $1.4 million budget. It received mixed reviews from critics, who praised its art direction and some praising Blair's performance, but criticized its similarity to other slasher films. In the years since its release, the film has gone on to develop a cult following. Some critics and film scholars have noted the film for its subtext regarding social class, as well as for its depiction of Blair's character Marti Gaines as a resourceful and intelligent final girl.

== Plot ==
During “Hell Night,” four college pledges—Marti, Jeff, Seth, and Denise—are locked inside the abandoned Garth Manor as part of their fraternity and sorority initiation. Legend says the mansion’s owner, Raymond Garth, murdered his family twelve years earlier, leaving only his youngest, Andrew, unaccounted for. The students are told the gates won’t reopen until dawn.

While the pledges settle in, fraternity president Peter and two friends—Scott and May—sneak back to the property to scare them. Their prank goes wrong when May is dragged into an underground tunnel and killed by a deformed man believed to be Andrew Garth. The others assume she’s still pranking them.

Inside, more staged scares occur, but the group soon realizes someone else is in the house. Scott is murdered on the roof, and Peter is chased into the hedge maze and killed. Denise is taken next, leaving Seth to discover her disappearance and May’s severed head. Panicked, he escapes over the gate and runs for help.

Jeff and Marti search the manor, finding Scott’s body and signs of a real killer. Jeff arms himself with a pitchfork and discovers Peter’s corpse in the maze, unaware the gate keys are still in Peter’s hand. Meanwhile, Seth fails to convince the police—who are overwhelmed with Hell Night pranks—but steals a rifle and a car to return.

Back at the manor, Jeff and Marti are attacked by a deformed man hiding under a rug. They chase him through a trap door into the tunnels, where they find Denise’s body arranged at a grotesque dining table. The killer pursues them up a stairwell, injuring Jeff, but they manage to barricade themselves.

Seth arrives and confronts the killer near the garden, shooting him and knocking him into a pond. Believing he has killed Andrew Garth, Seth rushes inside—only to be dragged away by a second surviving Garth brother. A gunshot rings out, and Seth’s rifle is thrown into the hall.

Marti retrieves the weapon but is attacked by the second mutant. She escapes, helps Jeff flee to a bedroom, and climbs out onto the roof. The killer throws Jeff to his death, forcing Marti to run. She finds Peter’s body, retrieves the gate keys, and reaches Seth’s stolen car. After getting it started, she crashes backward into the gate to break it down.

The killer jumps onto the car, smashing the windshield, but Marti drives forward into the fallen gate, impaling him on its spikes. As dawn breaks, she walks away—the sole survivor of Hell Night.

== Cast ==
- Linda Blair as Marti Gaines
- Peter Barton as Jeff Reed
- Vincent Van Patten as Seth Davies
- Suki Goodwin as Denise Dunsmore
- Kevin Brophy as Peter Bennett
- Jimmy Sturtevant as Scott Zamboni
- Jenny Neumann as May West
- Gloria Heilman as Party Girl
- Hal Ralston as Old Cop
- Carey Fox as Younger Cop
- Ron Gans as The Driver
- Jean Hasselhoff as Party Guest (uncredited)
- Nathan L. Truman as Fraternity Member (uncredited)
- An unknown and uncredited actor as Andrew Garth

== Themes ==
James Tucker of Rue Morgue magazine notes that Hell Night contains a subtext regarding social class in both the central characters as the working-class Marti Gaines (Linda Blair) and wealthy Jeff Reed (Peter Barton) discuss at length the differences between their respective low and high-class backgrounds, as well as the villains of Andrew and Morris Garth, deformed brothers who were neglected by their wealthy father Raymond and concealed in the family's sprawling mansion.

Literary critic and film scholar John Kenneth Muir cites the character of Marti as emblematic of the working class, writing: "She's a smart young woman (her father is a garage mechanic), is resolutely blue collar, in contrast to the other pledges, and shares an interesting conversation regarding capitalism and the division between the rich and poor with the ill-fated Jeff."

== Production ==
=== Development ===
Randy Feldman, then a recent graduate of the University of California, Berkeley, wrote the screenplay for Hell Night over an approximate five-week period. Feldman was loosely inspired by the plot of Black Christmas (1974), which centers on a killer preying on sorority sisters in their sorority house. Feldman stated in a 2018 interview that he approached the writing of the screenplay in a literary manner, owing to his background as a college English major, and admitted the original draft was excessively detailed.

Feldman shopped the spec script to several film studios, among them Irwin Yablans's Compass International Pictures, who had distributed John Carpenter's Halloween (1978). Producer Bruce Cohn Curtis, a colleague of Yablans, subsequently contacted Feldman and expressed interest in purchasing the film rights. Mark L. Lester had also read the screenplay, but passed on directing the project. Curtis and his brother helped finance the film, which Curtis pitched to director Tom DeSimone, with whom he had worked on Chatterbox (1977). Several of the film's financiers were businesspeople in Washington, D.C., who were friends of Curtis's brother.

Feldman's screenplay was slightly altered after it was purchased by Curtis, mainly in its implementation of an additional villain; the original draft had only featured one of the Garth brothers as a killer instead of two. Chuck Russell, who would later direct A Nightmare on Elm Street 3: Dream Warriors (1987), served as executive producer on the film.

=== Casting ===
Actress Linda Blair was the first to become attached to the project through her working relationship with producer Curtis, who had produced several of her previous films, including Born Innocent (1974) and Roller Boogie (1979). The film marked her first horror film in several years, following The Exorcist (1973) and Exorcist II: The Heretic (1977).

Johanna Ray served as the film's casting director, and it was her first feature film credit. Curtis sought Peter Barton for the role of Jeff. Barton, a model, was hesitant to take the role and was considering abandoning his acting career at the time, but Curtis convinced him to star in the film. Vincent Van Patten was subsequently cast as Seth Davies, while Suki Goodwin, an English actress, was cast in the role of Denise Dunsmore.

=== Filming ===
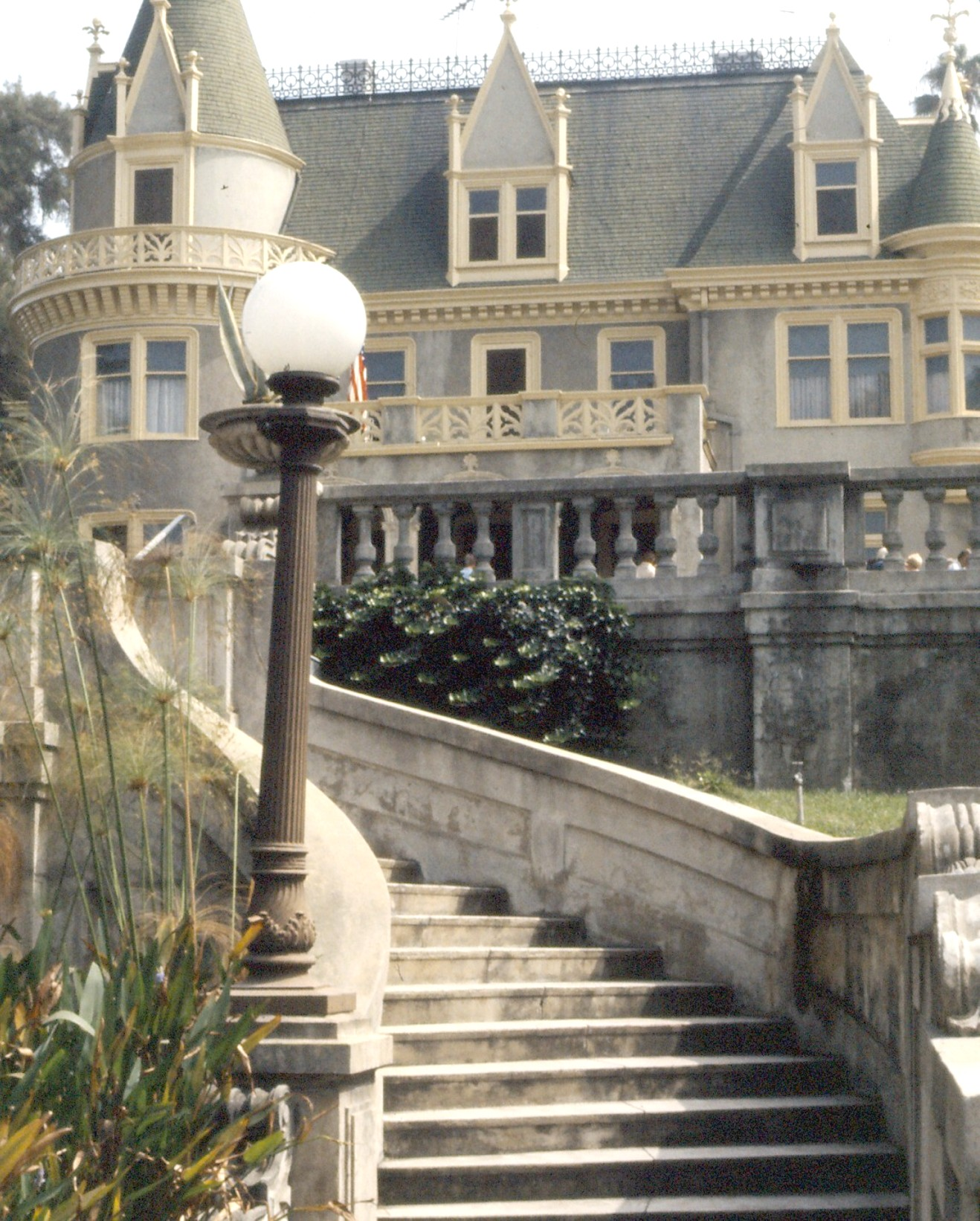
The film was shot on location at Kimberly Crest Mansion in Redlands, California

Principal photography for Hell Night took 40 days in the fall and winter of 1980, between November 1980 and January 1981 (Note: Bruce Cohn Curtis recalls shooting a scene of the film on New Year's Eve, meaning the production ran until at least January 1981.) with Swedish cinematographer Mac Ahlberg. Frank Darabont, a collaborator of the film's executive producer, Chuck Russell, served as a production assistant.

The original filming budget for Hell Night was $1 million, but the shoot's duration through the holidays extended the budget an additional $400,000. The film's shooting schedule reportedly consisted of six-day weeks and was described as grueling. Star Linda Blair recalled the daily shoots lasting from 5:00 a.m. to 11:00 p.m., and that the tight schedule demanded the cast and crew spend Thanksgiving working on the film, with the production renting a double-decker bus used to serve them a Thanksgiving meal.

The majority of the film was shot in three locations: The exterior of Garth Manor was shot at the Kimberly Crest mansion in Redlands, California. The hedge maze was brought in as there was no actual garden maze on the mansion property. The inside of Garth Manor was filmed in a residential home in Pasadena, California. The frat party was filmed in an apartment lobby in Los Angeles, with the exteriors of the party filmed at the University of Redlands. The seemingly many tunnels in the movie were actually only two corridors through which the director had the actors repeatedly running from different angles. Additional interior photography took place at Raleigh Studios in Hollywood.

Director De Simone stated he wanted a "classic Gothic look" for the film: "I don't like these horror films where people are walking around haunted houses wearing jeans and T-shirts. So we threw our heads together and I said I wanted Linda in a Gothic kind of wardrobe. And we came up with the idea to make the hell night party a costume party. And that way we were able to have everyone in those kinds of costumes that suited their personality." During filming, producer Curtis urged DeSimone to implement an extended chase sequence for Linda Blair's character after seeing Jamie Lee Curtis's chase sequence in Terror Train (1980); this was the basis of the chase sequence that takes place in the tunnels under the mansion.

The two actors who portrayed the Garth killers are not listed anywhere in the credits, although their real names are believed to be Valentino Richardson and Chad Butler. However, on the film's DVD commentary, it was noted that they are both German nationals who spoke little or no English, and that one of them (the middle-aged bearded man) died shortly after the release of the film.

== Release ==
Hell Night was given a regional limited theatrical release in the United States beginning August 7, 1981 by Compass International Pictures, opening in cities such as Detroit and Miami. Three weeks later, on August 28, 1981, the film expanded to a wide theatrical release before having its Los Angeles and New York City openings on September 4, 1981.

=== Home media ===
The film was released on VHS by Media Home Entertainment in 1982. It was later released on VHS and DVD by Anchor Bay Entertainment on August 31, 1999. The DVD release featured an audio commentary with Linda Blair, producers Bruce Cohn Curtis and Irwin Yablans, and director Tom DeSimone; it also included television spots and the original theatrical trailer as bonus material.

On January 2, 2018, Scream Factory released the film for the first time on Blu-ray in a Collector's Edition set, which features four hours of new interviews, as well as the bonus materials contained on the 1999 Anchor Bay DVD. The British distributor 101 Films issued a limited edition Blu-ray on July 26, 2021.

== Reception ==
=== Box office ===
During its opening week in Detroit, the film was the highest-grossing release in the city, out-earning Raiders of the Lost Ark, with box office receipts totaling $187,000. During the September 4 weekend, the film ranked at number eleven at the U.S. box office, with earnings of $832,000. The film grossed a total of USD$5,300,000 in the United States by the end of its theatrical run.

=== Critical response ===
Hell Night received mixed-to-negative reviews at the time of its release. John Corry of The New York Times gave the film a middling review, concluding that, "Hell Night does make one original contribution to the genre. One college student, played by Linda Blair of Exorcist fame, does escape from that terrible house. Miss Blair is throaty and rather vacant, but the character she plays is a child of the working class. Her father runs a gas station. Get it? Those nasty privileged children are only getting what they deserve. Maybe the new filmmakers are only sentimental liberals, after all."

Time Out wrote "Amazing [...] what a competent director, cameraman and cast can do to help out a soggy plot", calling the film "tolerably watchable by comparison with the average Halloween rip-off." The Washington Post's Tom Shales criticized Blair's performance, and summarized: "Director Tom De Simone handles the shocks competently but not imaginatively, and most people will be able to guess from which side of the frame the beastie will leap... Cinematographer Mac Ahlberg (I, a Woman) fails to make the most of the handsome 16-room mansion in Redlands, Calif., where most of the picture was filmed, perhaps in one night."

Roger Ebert of the Chicago Sun-Times gave the film a one-star review, writing: "You know a movie is in trouble when what is happening on the screen inspires daydreams. I had lasted through the first reel, and nothing had happened. Now I was somewhere in the middle of the third reel, and still nothing had happened. By "nothing," by the way, I mean nothing original, unexpected, well-crafted, interestingly acted, or even excitingly violent."

Critic Kevin Thomas of the Los Angeles Times wrote of the film favorably, praising Blair's performance, and remarking that its art direction and costume design "contribute substantially to Hell Night's overall superior craftsmanship... It's the kind of picture that just might give adults as well as youngsters nightmares." Thomas Fox of The Commercial Appeal similarly felt the film was frightening, writing: "Hell Night is scary. Silly, predictable, and sometimes unintentionally funny. But scary." The Evansville Courier & Press's Patrice Smith felt the screenplay was "penned with a moderate dose of intelligence" and praised the film's cinematography and performances, adding that it "reverts to classical directorial approaches to suspense... That method alone is praiseworthy."

Linda Blair was nominated for a Razzie Award in the category of Worst Actress for her performance, losing to Faye Dunaway for Mommie Dearest and Bo Derek for Tarzan, the Ape Man, who were tied, at the 2nd Golden Raspberry Awards.

As of May 2023, 57% of 14 critics on review aggregator Rotten Tomatoes gave the film a favorable review, with an average weighted rating of 5/10. On Metacritic the film has a weighted average score of 36 out of 100, based on 4 critics, indicating "generally unfavorable" reviews.

=== Legacy ===
Hell Night has attained a cult following in the years since its release. Critic Robin Wood retrospectively praised the film for portraying a strong lead character, Marti, calling her "an active and resourceful heroine capable of doing more than screaming and falling over." Anton Bitel, writing for Little White Lies in 2021, similarly observes that the film "reconfigures the slasher as social struggle, with Marti not just its final girl, but also its working-class heroine. And while she may continue to embrace liberty and equality, Marti learns to turn her back on fraternity. Literary scholar John Kenneth Muir similarly notes that the character of Marti has been cited as one of several female heroines of slasher films that bear a unisex name, adding that, "whether or not that's significant, Blair crafts a unique and interesting character."

In his book The Gorehound’s Guide to Splatter Films of the 1980s (2003), film scholar Scott Stine wrote of the film: "Hell Night is one of those early '80s stalk 'n' slash quickies that—although almost universally despised at the time, despite the fact they made money—is actually quite endearing in retrospect.

In 2013, Ray Fulk, a Lincoln, Illinois resident, bequeathed his $1 million estate—including a 165-acre (67 ha) farm—to the film's two stars, Peter Barton and Kevin Brophy, of whom he was a fan. In his will, Fulk described Barton and Brophy as friends, though neither of the actors had ever met him.

== Sources ==
- Blair, Linda; Curtis, Bruce Cohn; DeSimone, Tom; Yablans, Irwin (1999). Hell Night (DVD audio commentary). Anchor Bay Entertainment.
- Harper, Jim (2004). Legacy of Blood: A Comprehensive Guide to Slasher Movies. Critical Vision. ISBN 978-1-900-48639-2.
- Kerswell, J. A. (2018). The Teenage Slasher Movie Book (2nd, revised ed.). Mount Joy, Pennsylvania: Fox Chapel Publishing. ISBN 978-1-620-08307-9.
- Milne, Tom, ed. (1991). The Time Out Film Guide (Second ed.). London, England: Penguin Books. ISBN 978-0-140-14592-2.
- Muir, John Kenneth (2012). Horror Films of the 1980s. Vol. 1. Jefferson, North Carolina: McFarland & Company. ISBN 978-0-786-47298-7. OCLC 840902442.
- Rockoff, Adam (2002). Going to Pieces: The Rise and Fall of the Slasher Film, 1978-1986. Jefferson, North Carolina: McFarland & Company. ISBN 978-0-786-46932-1.
- Stine, Scott Aaron (2003). The Gorehound's Guide to Splatter Films of the 1980s. Jefferson, North Carolina: McFarland & Company. ISBN 978-1-476-61132-7.
- Wilson, John (2005). The Official Razzie Movie Guide: Enjoying the Best of Hollywood's Worst. New York City, New York: Grand Central Publishing. ISBN 978-0-446-69334-9.
- Wood, Robin (1987). "Returning the Look: Eyes of a Stranger". In Waller, Gregory Albert (ed.). American Horrors: Essays on the Modern American Horror Film. Champaign, Illinois: University of Illinois Press. pp. 79–86. ISBN 978-0-252-01448-2.
