= Irwin Yablans =

American film producer and distributor

- Born: July 25, 1934 (age 91); Brooklyn, New York
- Occupation: Film producer

Irwin Yablans (born July 25, 1934) is an American independent film producer and distributor known for his work in the horror film industry. His brother, Frank Yablans, was also a producer.

== Life and career ==
Yablans was born to a Jewish family in Brooklyn, New York. In 1976, he formed Compass International Pictures with Joseph Wolf, and served as its president.

=== Movie career ===
He produced films that included Halloween (1978), Tourist Trap (1979), Roller Boogie (1979), Nocturna: Granddaughter of Dracula (1979), Halloween II (1981), Hell Night (1981), Blood Beach (1981), Halloween III: Season of the Witch (1982), and Tank (1984). Since his resignation from Compass International, Yablans produced films with Charles Band such as Prison (1988).

Halloween began as an idea suggested by Yablans who envisioned a film about babysitters being menaced by a stalker. Carpenter took the idea and another suggestion from Yablans that it take place during Halloween and developed them into a story. Along with noted film producer and financier Moustapha Akkad, Yablans put forward $300,000 for the film's production, filming in Pasadena, California over the course of 20 days. Released in late October 1978, Halloween was an unprecedented success, making $70 million in its initial theatrical run, and becoming the highest grossing independent film of all time; it was surpassed by Teenage Mutant Ninja Turtles 12 years later. Yablans and Akkad remained as executive producers on further films after the original's sequel rights were sold to Dino De Laurentiis, then to other studios, with Akkad producing every entry in the series until his death in 2005. Yablans and Akkad, along with producer Joseph Wolf, founded the independent production and distribution studio Compass International Pictures (later Trancas International Films Ltd).
