= Bill Butler (skater) =

Bill Butler, also known as Mr. Charisma, is a roller skater and choreographer credited with the invention of jammin’.

The National Museum of Roller Skating referred to Butler as the creator of the “Jammin” skate style (technique), stating that "Butler’s iconic moves and styles inspired many of the popular moves and styles of today"

The New York Times and The City Reliquary have referred to Butler as "the Godfather of Roller Disco".

== Life ==
Butler is from Detroit, Michigan and skated at the Arcadia Rink.

While stationed in Alaska, Butler invented the jammin' rollerskating technique.

In 1957, when stationed in Brooklyn as a young serviceman, Butler visited the Empire Roller Rink, then owned by Hector and Henry Abrami. Upon his arrival, Butler noted that all the skaters were Black, but the music did not reflect their cultural preferences. In his own words:

When I got there it was all organ music. Nothing related to black people and how we danced. So I brought my own music with me, and asked Mr [Henry] Abrami if he would play a number I had, Night Train by Count Basie.

The skaters responded positively to the disc-jockeyed music, and following this, the rink began to play jazz and R&B records; with "Butler...at the forefront of this new age for skating". Meanwhile, Butler also introduced Empire's skaters to jam skating. Skater Gloria McCarthy, whose father owned the rink, started a "Bounce" night to showcase Butler's new style.

By 1979, Butler became the rink's instructor, performer, and creative consultant. A photograph shows Butler at a Casablanca Records party at Empire, instructing Cher by leading her by the hand. Butler's "stylish tricks...made the [Empire Roller Disco] a HOT destination" [sic], as it "drew storied celebrities away from the snooty uptown clubs (Studio 54) down to the warm & accepting Brooklyn Rink". The most notable celebrity guest was Cher, who hosted Billboard's Disco Forum skate party at the Empire Roller Disco that year. Others included Prince, Grace Jones, Madonna, and Olivia Newton-John.

He is also credited with popularizing the "roller rocking" and "Brooklyn Bounce" techniques at Empire Roller Rink in the late 1950s to the 1980s.

Butler was the skate director for the 2006 film Roll Bounce, having "had control over all aspects of skating in the film". He introduced the film as a special guest during a 2023 event at The City Reliquary.

== See also ==
- Roller skating
- List of roller skaters
