= Roll-A-Palace =

Building in New York City

- Interactive map of the Roll-A-Palace area

General information
- Location: 1728 Sheepshead Bay Road; Sheepshead Bay, Brooklyn, New York, United States
- Coordinates: 40°35′7.5″N 73°57′7″W
- Opened: 1977
- Closed: Circa 1987

The Roll-A-Palace Disco Skating Rink was a roller disco rink established in 1977 in Sheepshead Bay, Brooklyn, New York, United States. Housed in a former movie theater, it reopened as a rink at 1728 Sheepshead Bay Road.

In 1979, Billboard and Cue magazines praised the rink, respectively describing it as "a typical example of the modern roller disco" and "the front-runner of the roller-disco craze". At its height, it had over 5,000 customers per weekend, with separate sessions for families, teens, and young adults.

== History ==
=== Movie theater ===
The Sheepshead Bay Century Circuit Theater opened on July 12, 1929. It featured a Kimball International theater organ and a Western Electric sound system.

In 1930, Motion Picture News praised the theater as a "palace erected to the presentation of sound pictures". The building was designed by architect Thomas R. Short in what was then called a pronounced Modernist style, which was considered on-trend. It had an oval-shaped lounge featuring "the modernistic scheme with the French idea accentuated", designed for what it referred to as the "comforts of the woman patron". Construction was done by A. H. Schwartz of the Homack Construction Company; interior design by Wiliam Rau of Rau Studios Inc.; and furnishings by Teresa Jackson. It was built in what was then Sheepshead Bay's business district.

In 1943, the theater transferred ownership to movie theater chain Rugoff & Becker, becoming Sheepshead Theatre. In the late 1950s, it changed ownership again to Century Theatres, who operated the theater until its closure in 1970.

On May 3, 1977, New York's Board of Standards and Appeals approved the theater structure's enlargement and its "conversion into a skating rink with accessory uses".

=== Renovation and reopening ===
After a million-dollar renovation of the Sheepshead Bay Century movie theater, the establishment reopened as a roller skating venue in 1977. By the following year, they were known as a family-friendly establishment; a promotional item in New York read, "Roller Skating for the Family . . . No Dungarees".

Its admission price in 1979 was $4, including rentable skates. The rink featured a light and sound system; a snack bar with a 400-person capacity; and a separate dance floor area (possibly a sprung floor or illuminated dance floor).

=== 1979 disco craze ===
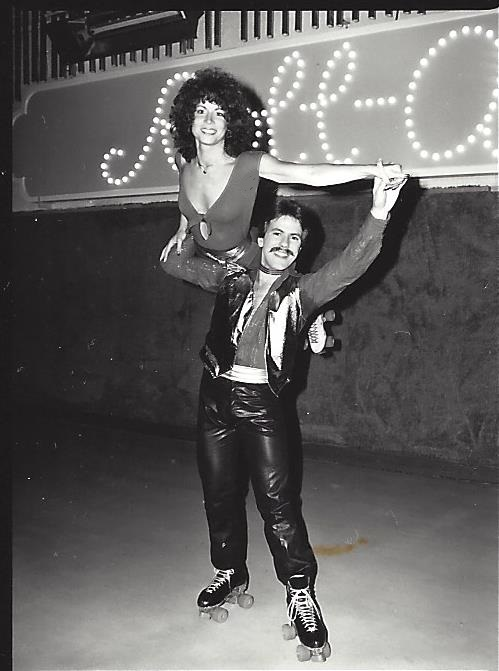
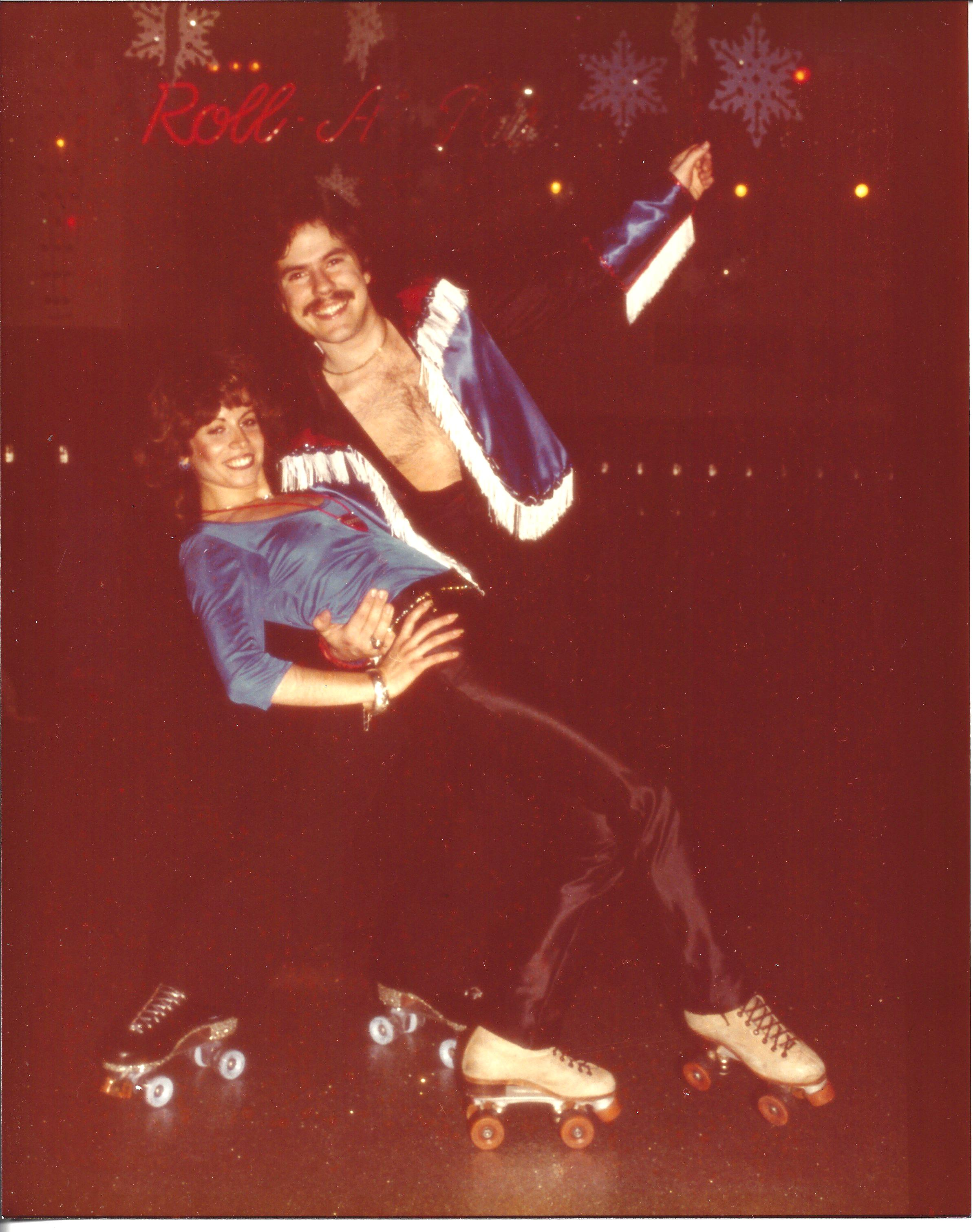
Disco skaters at the Roll-A-Palace, 1979

The year 1979 was the height of popularity of the Roll-A-Palace. In 1979, Cue magazine praised the rink as "a fabulous $2 million roller disco in a former movie theater" and "the front-runner of the roller-disco craze".

Similarly, in that year's ranking of various roller discos, Cue described New York's Empire Roller Disco, the birthplace of roller disco, as "not as snazzy as the Roll-A-Palace".

The same year, Billboard prominently featured Roll-A-Palace in its article "Going Back to the 1870s: Skating To Music". Billboard also claimed the rink's popularity was in part due to the proximity of Bensonhurst, which was the setting and filming location of 1977 drama film Saturday Night Fever.

In January 1979, Roll-A-Palace collaborated with WKTU (the nation's preeminent disco radio station) to promote a new song and dance titled the "Disco Dip". Written by Ed Chaplin, the song was widely considered the first song/dance written specifically to promote the roller disco hobby. It would also be "the first roller disco record played in a skating rink". Roll-A-Palace hosted the song's debut party, as well as a follow-up series of "'Disco Dip' nights to promote roller-disco".

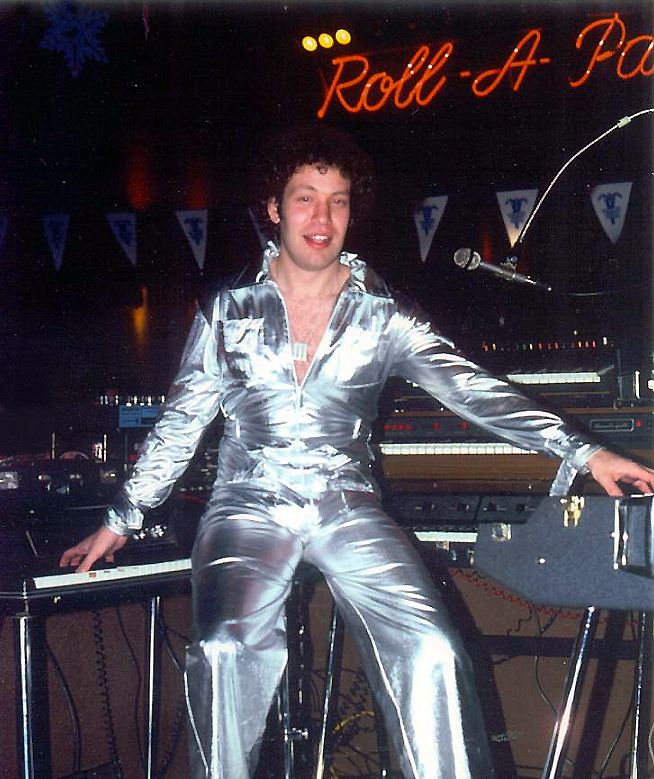
Roller disco performance at Roll-A-Palace, Brooklyn, 1979

However, the day before the first "Disco Dip" event, New Jersey musician Mark Winter premiered his song "Roller Palace", likely named for the establishment. Because the song's premiere preceded the "Disco Dip" by one day, it is likely the first roller disco-themed record, although it only received media coverage in October 1979. Its lyrics humorously describe a "love on wheels" romance at a "disco, disco roller palace" where "everyone rocks as they roll". The lyrics to "Roller Palace" were featured in the Scholastic Book, "Roller Fever!" by Linda Konner in 1970.

Recalling the rink, one local reminisced in 2003,

I waited online [sic] on Sheepshead Bay Road to get into this theatre as a kid. ... Once inside, the auditorium was gutted and there was a wood floor for skating. [The] DJ booth was up a ladder, probably where the projection booth once was. ... There was a horrible acoustic echo as the sound bounced all over.

In the 1979 Complete Book of Roller Skating, local roller skating students were said to agree that "this rink is one of the nicest places to learn to skate in the area".

=== Later years ===
There was a lawsuit involving the rink in 1983.

On May 5, 1987, New York's Board of Standards and Appeals granted a variance to approve the skating rink's conversion to a Jack LaLanne Health Club.

=== Successors ===
By 1996, it was retitled Bally Total Fitness, the conditions of which were later considered unfavorable by local community members. The gym became a 24 Hour Fitness after a corporate buyout in 2015. Circa 2022, it became a Synergy Fitness, prior to closure in 2024.

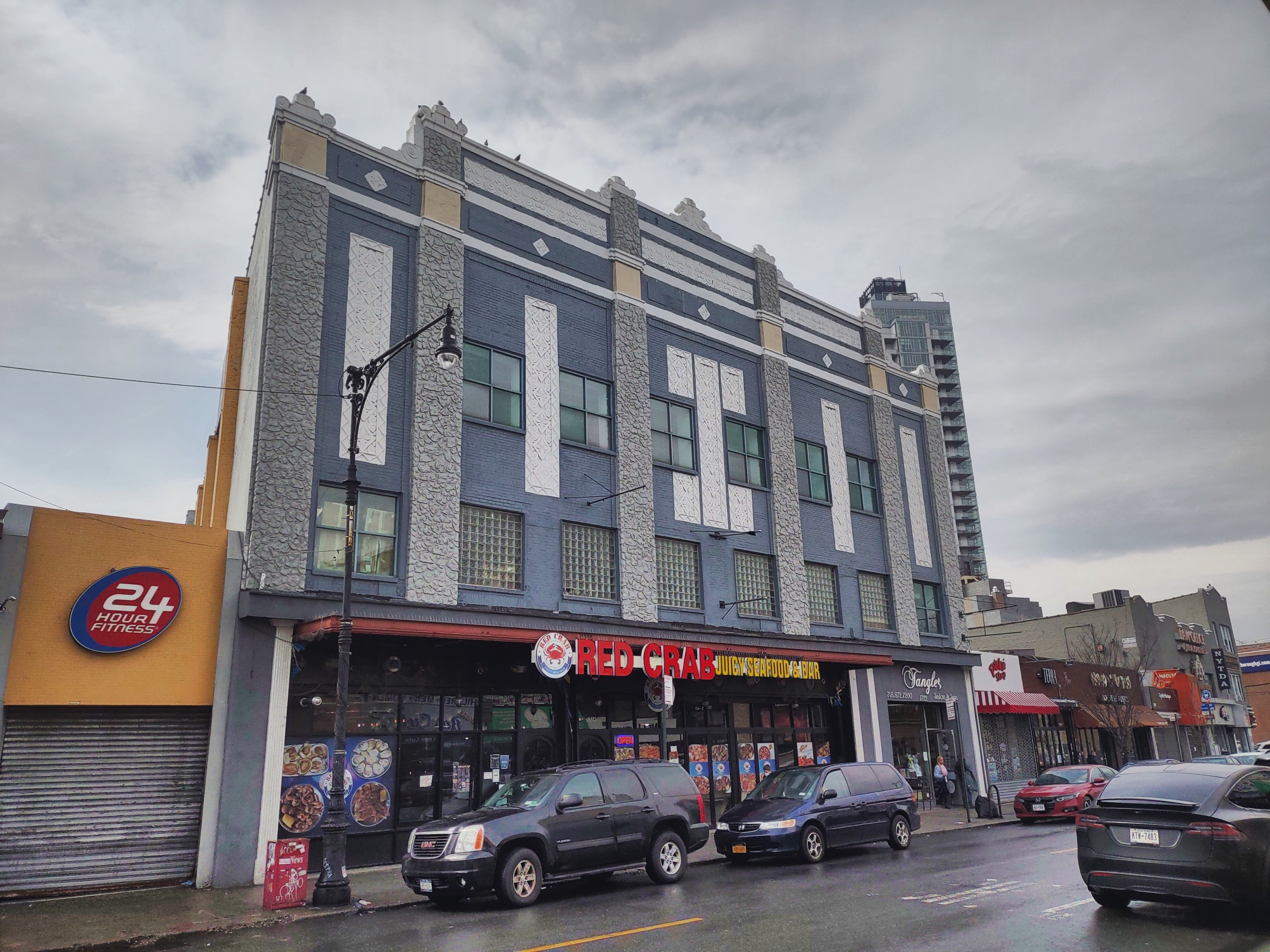
Current view of the Sheepshead Theater / Roll-A-Palace building, 2022

== Legacy and impact ==
The rink impacted the lives of several local DJs, who would go on to popularize house and electro music.

House DJ Frankie Bones has recalled the rink's influence on his life and career, stating he learned how to skate at the Roll-A-Palace as a child. In 2003, he wrote that he experienced the peak disco era (1979) through roller-skating. On his first visit to Roll-A-Palace on May 11, 1978, he "came home and typed up a HOT 100 record chart", placing The Eruptions' cover of "I Can't Stand the Rain" at #1.

Similarly, Lenny Dee began his DJ career at the Roll-A-Palace circa 1985, at the age of 17.

Nearby rink RollerJam USA in Staten Island has hosted a reunion or reunion(s) for Roll-A-Palace skaters. RollerJam was considered the last remaining roller rink in NYC, prior to its 2024 closure.

== See also ==
- Roller Boogie (1979), a jukebox film released at the height of the roller skating craze
- Get Rollin' (1980), a docu-drama about disco rollerskaters in New York City
