= Branch Brook Park =

County park of Essex County, New Jersey

- U.S. National Register of Historic Places
- U.S. Historic district
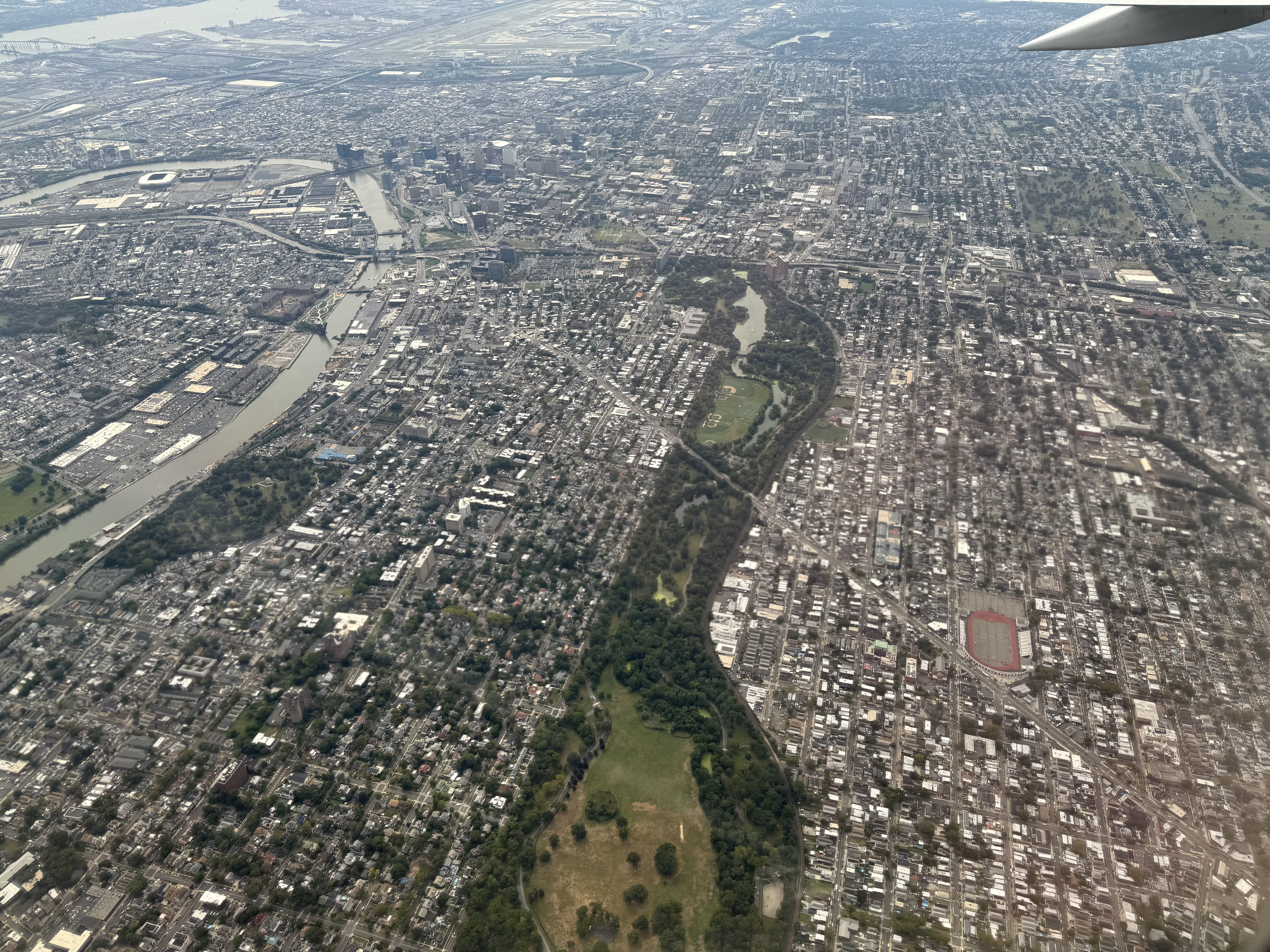
- Aerial view of Branch Brook Park

- Location within Essex County, New Jersey Location within New Jersey Location within the United States
- Location: Roughly bounded by Belleville Park, Washington and Clifton Avenues, 6th and Orange Streets, Newark and Belleville, New Jersey
- Coordinates: 40°46′13″N 74°10′35″W
- Area: 359.7 acres (145.6 ha)
- Built: 1895
- Architects: Bogart & Barrett; Olmsted Brothers; Carrère and Hastings
- Architectural style: Late Victorian, French Renaissance
- NRHP reference No.: 81000392
- Added to NRHP: January 12, 1981

Branch Brook Park is a county park of Essex County, New Jersey. It is located in the North Ward of Newark, between the neighborhoods of Forest Hill and Roseville. A portion of the park is also located within the Township of Belleville. At 360 acres (150 ha), Branch Brook Park is the largest public park in the city of Newark.

The park is noted for the largest collection of cherry blossom trees in the United States, having over 5,000 in more than eighteen different varieties collectively called Cherryblossomland, as well as a Cherry Blossom Festival each April.

The park is home to many architecturally significant structures, including bridges, buildings, gates, and sculptures. Many of these were designed by the beaux-arts architectural firm of Carrère and Hastings headed by John Merven Carrère and Thomas Hastings. The pair designed two Subway Bridges now referred to as Subway 1, East and Subway 2, West.

== History ==
The area had served as an Army training ground during the American Civil War. At the time, the northern portion of the area had been a marsh known as Old Blue Jay Swamp. In 1867, Frederick Law Olmsted and Calvert Vaux, the designers of Central Park, presented their report on the site to the Board of Commissioners of the Newark Park. It recommended Concourse Hill, with its commanding views of Newark and distant Manhattan, as the best location for the park. However, the New Jersey State Legislature did not approve the $1 million required to acquire and improve the land. By the time the plan was re-visited 28 years later, only a third of the original 700 acres (280 ha) that was envisioned was available for twice the cost.

The park was formally created almost three decades later, in 1895, by the newly created Essex County Parks Commission, making it the nation's first county park. In 1898, a public appropriation financed the conversion of the swamp into a landscaped lake. The initial park was only 60 acres (24 ha) in size but grew in the 1920s through private donations from prominent Newark families, such as the Ballantines, eventually reaching the city limit with Belleville and becoming one of the largest urban parks in the United States.

The Morris Canal originally ran on the park's west side, until its old bed was turned into the Newark City Subway, providing access to the park from Downtown Newark.

The first designs of the park, based largely on romantic garden themes, were proposed in 1895 and 1898, after the Parks Commission hired several architectural firms to plan the park. In 1900, the commission hired the Olmsted Brothers firm to redesign the park. The result was the park's current naturalistic look and feel, with acres of meadows and forests, in a manner similar to their father's earlier designs of Central Park and Prospect Park.

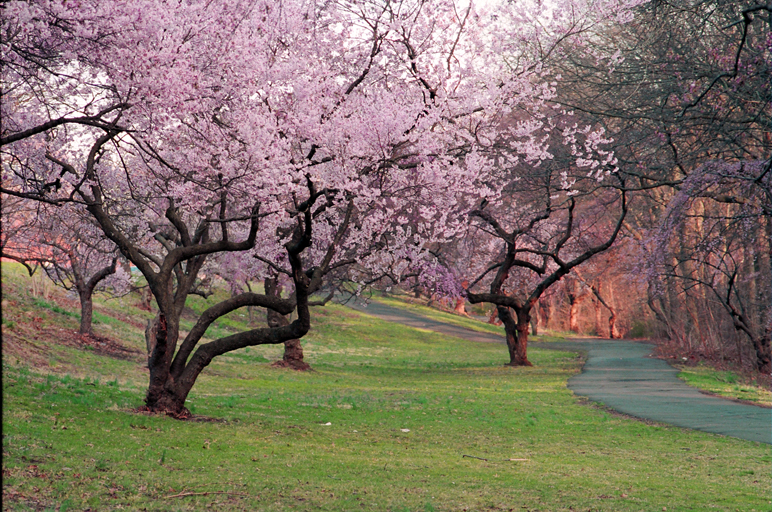
Cherry blossoms in Branch Brook Park

The famous cherry trees were the result of a 1927 gift from Caroline Bamberger Fuld, sister of department store magnate Louis Bamberger and widow of the store's vice president. The Cherry Blossom Festival attracts approximately 10,000 visitors each April. Branch Brook Park also features a lake and a pond.

During World War II, the park's grounds served a tent city for recruits, as well as a landing strip for airplanes of the United States Postal Service.

The neighborhood on the east side of the park, Forest Hill, is Newark's most affluent. Also on the east side of the park is the Cathedral of the Sacred Heart Basilica, one of the largest cathedrals in the United States.

It has been placed on both the New Jersey (1980) and National (1981) Registers of Historic Places.

=== Roller rink ===
In 1956, a former reservoir was converted to a skating rink to accommodate requests for year-round ice-skating facilities. In October 1957, it opened to the public, featuring dancing and roller-skating in the summer. Before December of that year, 50,000 skaters used the facility for ice-hockey and figure skating. In 1961, funds from a New Jersey Department of Transportation park sale purchase were used to fund an enlarged entrance and 230-car parking area. The structure was enclosed in 1969 for all-weather use. The present roller rink was designed circa 1992.

Its current iteration, Branch Brook Park Roller Skating Center, opened in 1996, is managed by national roller rink chain United Skates of America. The 12,000-foot roller rink building is located within the park, and has a contract with Essex County for Branch Brook. In 2013, NJ.com described the rink as "a symbol of revitalization for Newark" and "a literal savior of urban skating", exemplifying its relationship to the community, including roller derby, style skating, gospel skaters, and DJ nightlife.

=== Restoration ===
In 1999, Branch Brook Park began a $25 million ten-year restoration program. In 2004, the Park Avenue bridge was repaired, as were the baseball fields in the center of the park. In 2007, a plan was created to provide for more than 5,000 cherry trees in the park and renovate and rename the Welcome Center. The plan uses a $650,000 grant from the Essex County Recreation and the Open Space Trust Fund from 2006 and private donations.

In 2012, statues dedicated to sports figures Althea Gibson and Roberto Clemente were unveiled in the park. In 2013 the park was in the final phase of the restoration plan.

== Gallery ==
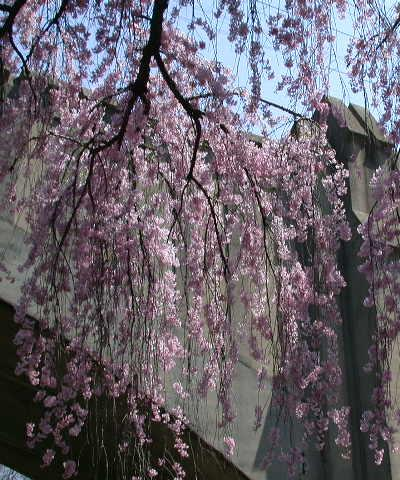
Branch Brook Park in Newark, New Jersey during the Cherry Blossom Festival

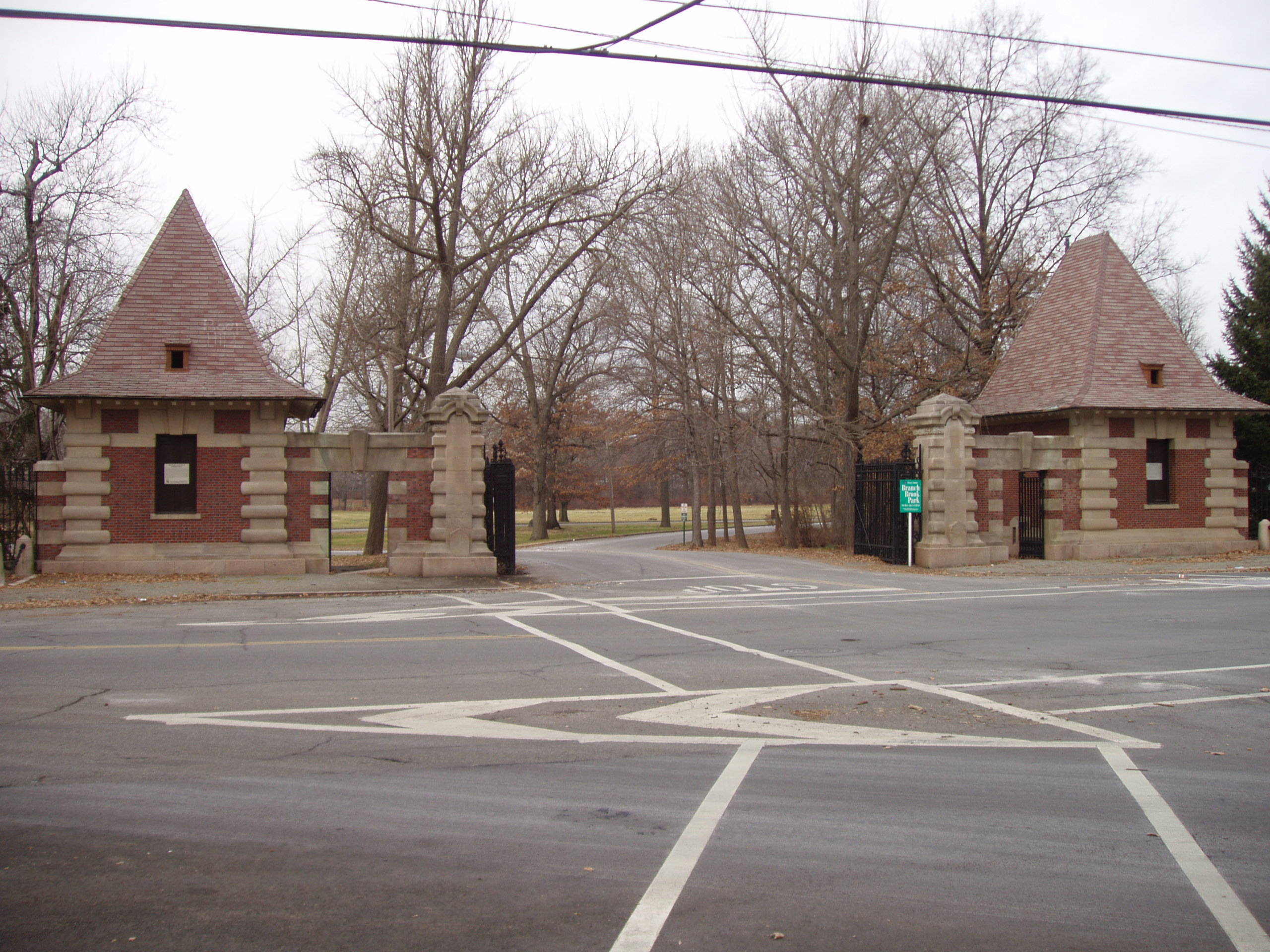
The Ballantine gates, on the east side of the park by Forest Hill, were given to Branch Brook Park by Peter Ballantine in 1899. They are modeled on gates in Scotland.

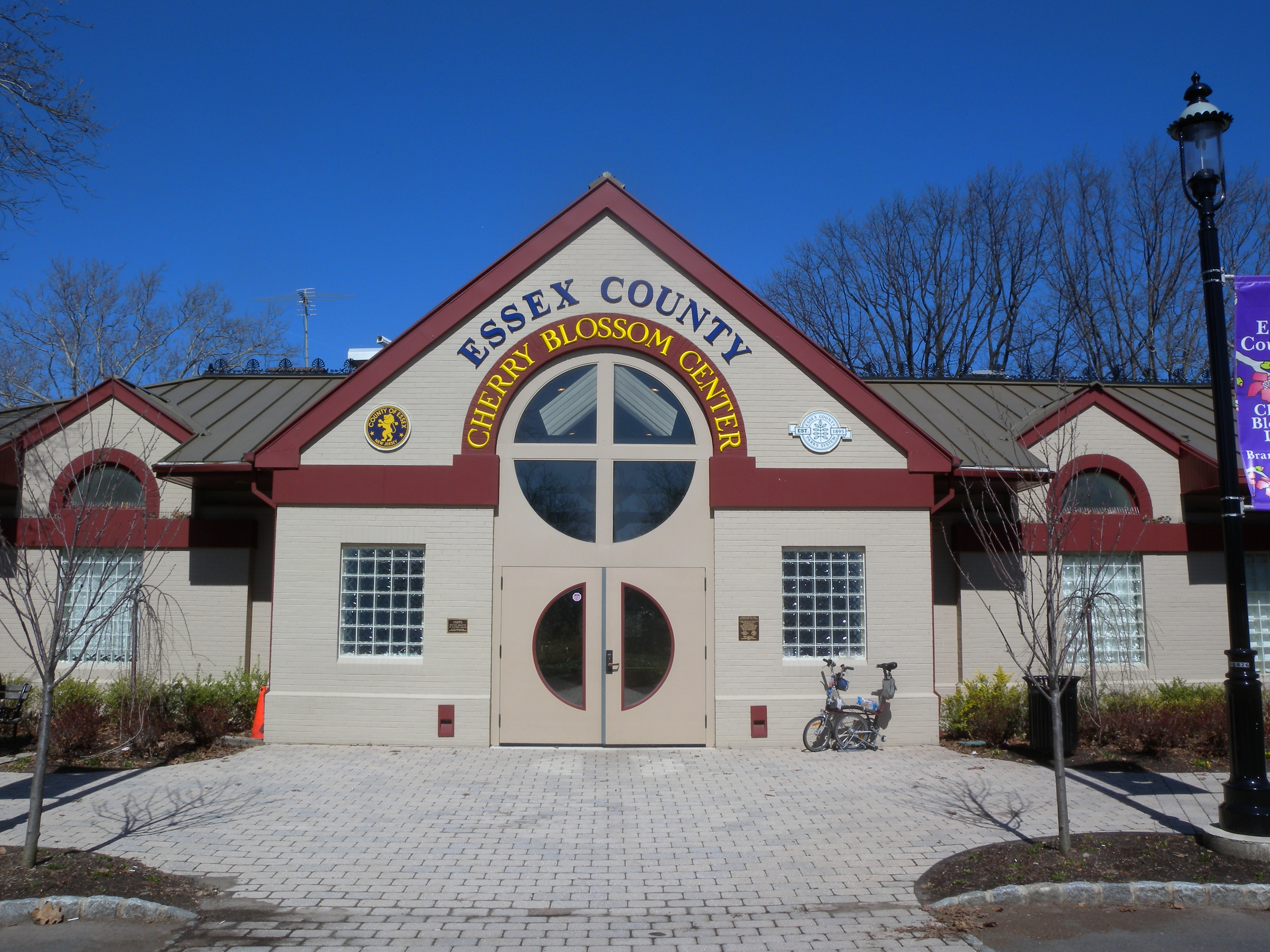
The Cherry Blossom Center.

== See also ==
- National Register of Historic Places listings in Essex County, New Jersey
