= Jam skating =

Sport discipline

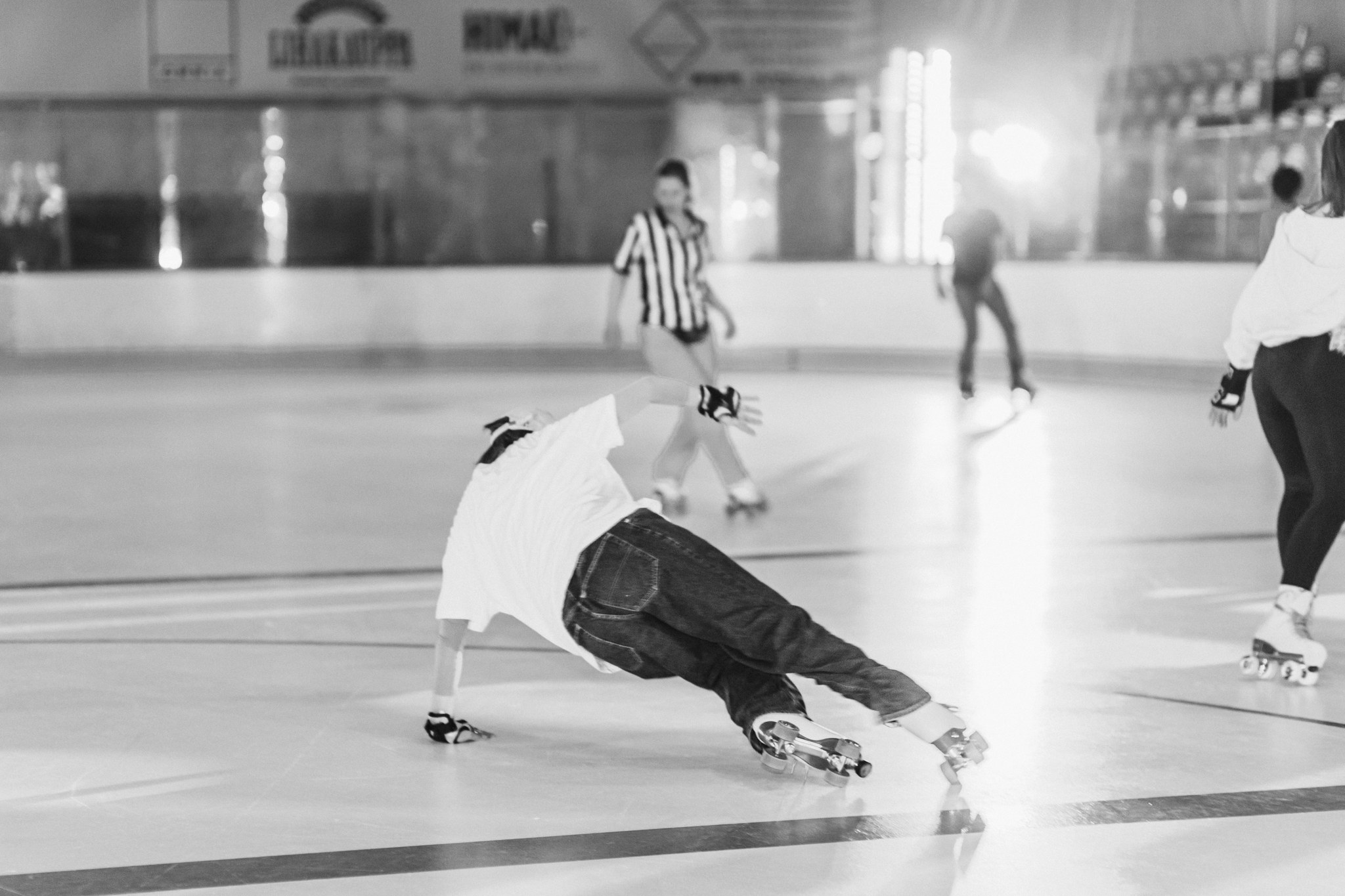
Jam skating

Jam skating (or Jamskating), also called Jammin', is a skating style consisting of a combination of dance, gymnastics, and roller skating, performed on roller skates.

The origins of jam skating are disputed, but it is often traced to the Great Lakes region, Florida and California.

The style has its roots in traditional roller disco, but has been greatly influenced by breakdancing, artistic skating, gymnastics, and modern dance. Successful jam skaters are well practiced in these different forms and must have the ability to translate these movements while on skates. Jam skating first became popular in the early 1970s and is still practiced.

== Origin ==
=== Jammin' ===
In the 1960s, Detroit skater Bill Butler, also known as Mr. Charisma, created a new style of roller skating he called "jammin'", possibly at the Arcadia Roller Rink in Michigan. While in New York, Butler convinced skater Gloria McCarthy, whose father owned the Empire Skate Center, to start a "Bounce" night to showcase his new style of skating.

Subsequently, jammin' led to the popularization of the roller disco. The Empire Skate Center in New York City is credited as the birthplace of roller disco, as it is where Mr. Charisma performed. His skills made the Empire a trendy venue for celebrities seeking to escape Studio 54, including Cher, Prince, Grace Jones, Madonna, and Olivia Newton-John, all of whom visited Empire to skate.

== Style ==
Styles of Jam Skating:

1. Shuffle skating/Rexing: shuffle skating to be skating with all 8 wheels down (or at times on just 1 wheel down), forward or backward, moving to the beat of the music usually in counterclockwise rink motion.
2. Footwork
3. Power: Power: This style of b-boying is what most members of the general public associate with the term "breakdancing". Power moves comprise full-body spins and rotations that give the illusion of defying gravity. Examples of power moves include head spins, back spins, windmills, flares, air tracks/air flares, 1990s, 2000s, jackhammers, crickets, turtles, hand glides, halos, and elbow spins. These Power moves are acrobatic moves that require momentum, speed, endurance, strength, and control to execute. The breaker is generally supported by his upper body while the rest of his body creates circular momentum. Some examples are the windmill, swipe, back spin, and head spin. Some power moves are borrowed from gymnastics and martial arts.
4. Ground breaking
5. Floorwork

Jam skating is neither aggressive nor speed skating. This form of freestyle skating is referred to by many different names: toe-dancing, spot-skating, shuffle skating, hexing, rexxing, trucking, shadow skating, crazy leg, boogie bouncing, and disco skating. These names strictly describe the style of skating, not the moves.

== Competition ==
Jam skating, like breakdancing in its early evolution, was an almost underground movement fueled by teenagers and skaters in their early 20s. Events were created to allow Jam Skaters to meet, trade moves, and, most importantly, "battle". Battling and performing remain a very important aspect of Jam Skating. This element pushes the boundaries of what is possible to perform while on skates; moreover, it ignites evolution within the skate culture.

Competitions, such as Heartbreak Skating Competition (Carrollton, GA), Pajama Jam (Franklin, IN), Southern Slam (Anderson, SC), Social Skate (Dallas, TX), The Championship (Cookeville, TN) and Classic Summer Jam (Sandy, UT) are examples.

== Equipment ==
Traditionally, roller disco skaters wore an artistic high-cut boot with toe stop. In the early 1980s, this transitioned into a trend of wearing low-cut speed skate boots with smaller jam plugs in place of the toe stops. This trend continues today, as the low-cut boot allows for more agility with feet while skating.

== In popular culture ==
=== Film ===
- The 1979 film Roller Boogie features an introductory scene with artistic skaters as well as jam skaters dancing to Earth, Wind, & Fire's "Boogie Wonderland".
- The 2005 film Roll Bounce prominently featured jam skating, along with some well-known skaters within the jam skating community.
- The 2006 film ATL was centered around a skating rink in Atlanta, GA called Cascade.

=== Music ===
Jam skating was featured in multiple music videos.

- I Will Survive video in 1979
- 1, 2 Step by Ciara ft. Missy Elliott in 2004
- "Disease" by Matchbox 20.
- "My Shoes" by Murphy Lee.
- "I Heart You" by Toni Braxton
- "Ladies Of The World" by Flight of the Conchords
- "Blow" by Beyoncé.
- "Cool Patrol" by Ninja Sex Party
- "Gold" by Chet Faker

=== Television ===
- Jam skating regained some mainstream popularity in 2008 when Shannon Anthony, Diamond Walker, Tony Zane, Jessy Nice, and Jordan McQuiston of Team Breaksk8 made it to the top 4 on America's Best Dance Crew (Season 1).
- The 2006 Apple iPod commercial, featuring the song "Feel Good, Inc." by Gorillaz.
- The short-running TV show Melyssa's Place (found on satellite TV) featured Melyssa Fernandez teaching skating to a young audience.

== See also ==
- Artistic roller skating
- Roller disco
- Roller derby
- Oumi Janta
