= Branch Brook Park Roller Skating Center =

Coordinates: 40.7522°N 74.1811°W

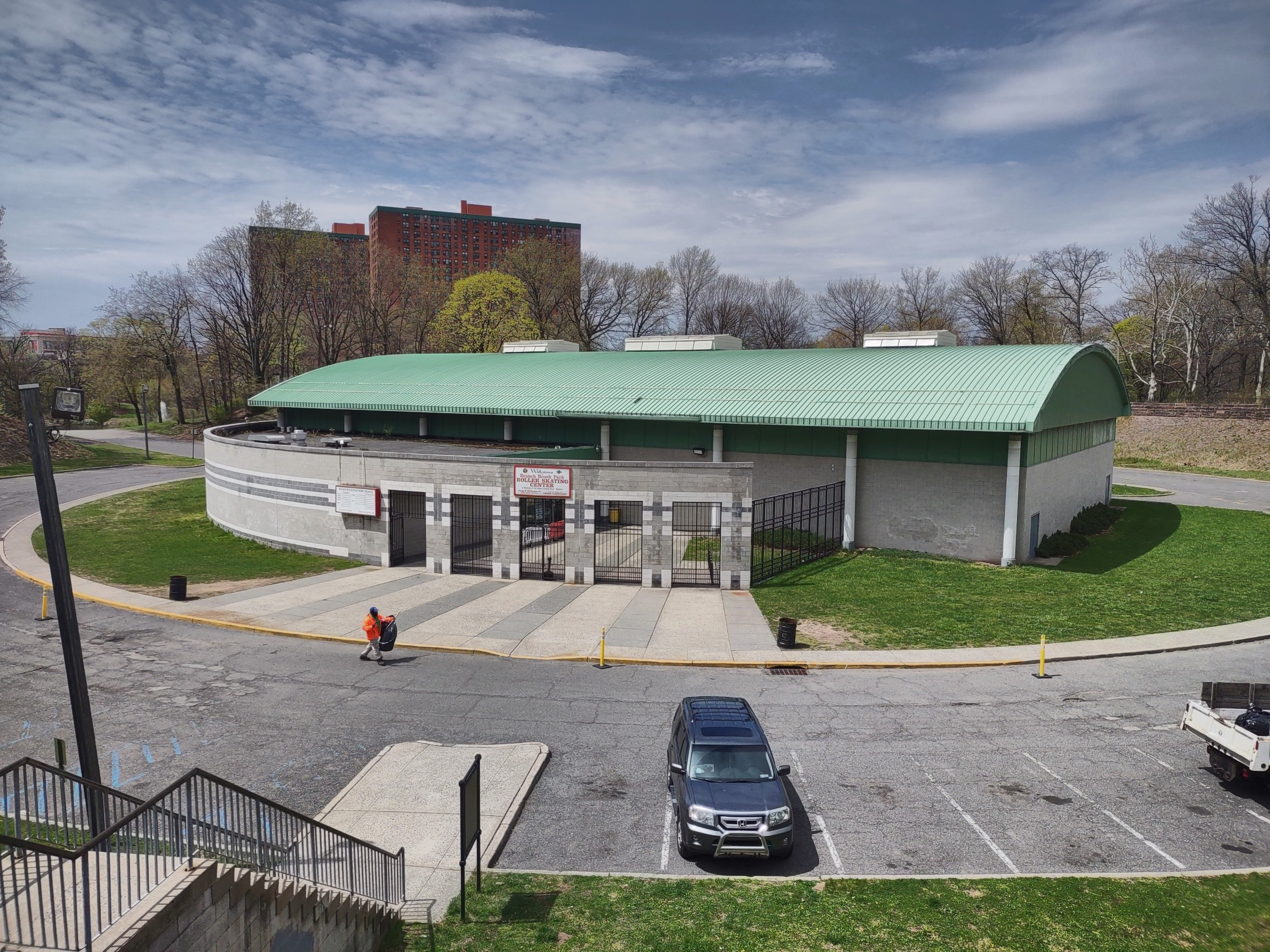
- Rink exterior in 2022

General information
- Address: Clifton Avenue, 7th Ave, Newark, NJ 07104
- Year(s) built: 1956

The Branch Brook Park Roller Skating Center is a 12,000-square-foot roller rink located in Branch Brook Park in Newark, New Jersey. Managed by United Skates of America, its current iteration has operated since 1996.

Like United Skates' other facilities, BBP Roller Skating Center hosts summer camps, birthday parties, STEM/ExL educational field trips, corporate events, DJed adult skate nights, and public events.

In 2013, NJ.com described the rink as "a symbol of revitalization for Newark" and "a literal savior of urban skating". It praised its relationship to the community, including events like roller derby, style skating, gospel skaters, and DJ nightlife. The rink has been called a "hidden gem" and a "staple of the [Newark] community".

== History ==
=== Predecessors ===
In 1956, a former reservoir was converted to a skating rink to accommodate requests for year-round ice-skating facilities. The open-air rink would facilitate ice hockey and figure-skating in the winter, and dancing and roller-skating events in the summer.

In October 1957, it opened to the public. Before December of that year, 50,000 skaters used the facility.

In 1961, funds from a New Jersey Department of Transportation park sale purchase were used to construct an enlarged entrance and 230-car parking area. By that time, however, the open-air template was considered obsolete. The structure was enclosed in 1969 for all-weather use.

=== Present rink ===
The present roller rink was "designed" circa 1992. It became the Branch Brook Park Roller Skating Center in 1996, which may have been the year it was purchased by United Skates of America, Inc., who are credited with revitalizing the property.

Its airbrushed murals feature the logos of Rutgers, the Jersey Devils, and what appear to be hibiscus flowers. Shuttered roller rinks are eulogized under two matching murals, both titled "Gone but Not Forgotten." These closed rinks include the Eastern Parkway, Metropolis, Highland Park, Skate 22, Twin City, Roxy Roller Rink, Skate Key, Empire (birthplace of the roller disco), Laces, Park Circle, Newark's Dreamland Arena, USA Edison, and Wheels In Motion.

Following its 1996 reopening, the current facility features phosphorescent airbrushed murals, blacklight fixtures, and multiple disco balls. Its DJs often feature upbeat House music to accompany skaters.

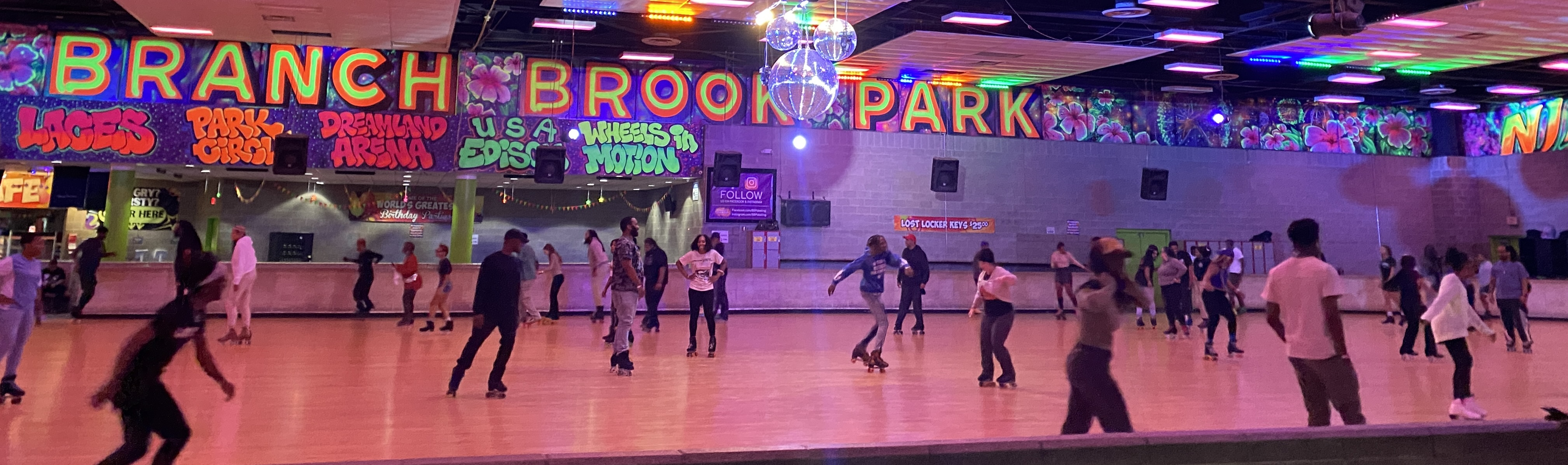
Skaters on the rink in 2024.

In 2024, site manager Alex Lorenzo attested that the site's attendance has increased in recent years. Tasha Klusmann, curator-historian of the National African American Roller Skating Archive, credited the rink's increase to the era following the COVID-19 pandemic and the "popularity of the skating scene on social media".

As of 2024, each Sunday night attracts over 300 roller skaters from across the country. Near the end of the night, the DJ announces that it is "trains and trios time", when skaters are invited to perform coordinated routines in groups of three or more, usually while interlocked at the elbow.

== In popular culture ==
2012 documentary The Rink details the rink's role in the Newark community. It describes the rink as "a space cherished by skaters" in "a city struggling to move beyond its past", recounting stories of roller derby competitors, style skaters, Newark's 1950s urban renewal, and the 1967 Newark riots all with the BBP Rink as its focus.

Filmmaker Sarah Friedland stated, "Branch Brook is a very important place, not just for Newark, but for the entire skating community," which she claims "has recently lost many key rinks to real-estate speculation and gentrification".

== See also ==
- History of Newark, New Jersey
- Roller disco, dance-specific roller facilities
- Inline skating
