= National Museum of Roller Skating =

Coordinates: 40.792030274616124°N 96.65431140000331°E

- Location within Nebraska
- Established: 1980
- Location: 4730 South St, Lincoln, NE 68506
- Type: Collection museum
- Website: www.rollerskatingmuseum.org

The National Museum of Roller Skating is a roller skating museum located in Lincoln, Nebraska. It is likely the only roller skating-focused museum in the world.

It purports to contain the world's largest collection of roller skating artifacts, including equipment, costumes, films, and artwork dating back to 1819, as well as memorabilia of other sports related to the hobby.

It shares a building with USA Roller Sports, the nationwide governing body of roller sports.

== History ==
According to the museum, the building is located in a former utility warehouse of the Lincoln Telegram and Telegraph Company. It transferred ownership in an unknown year.

=== Museum ===
The museum was established in 1980 and opened to the public on April 13, 1982.

Its audio tour details the history of roller skating, including roller derby in the United States; the roller disco craze; and roller skating in films such as Shall We Dance, Rollerball, Roller Boogie, Xanadu, Roll Bounce, and Skateland.

Display groupings include artistic skating, inline skating, roller derby, speed skating, and a 1956 "jetpack" skating prototype which was a commercial failure.

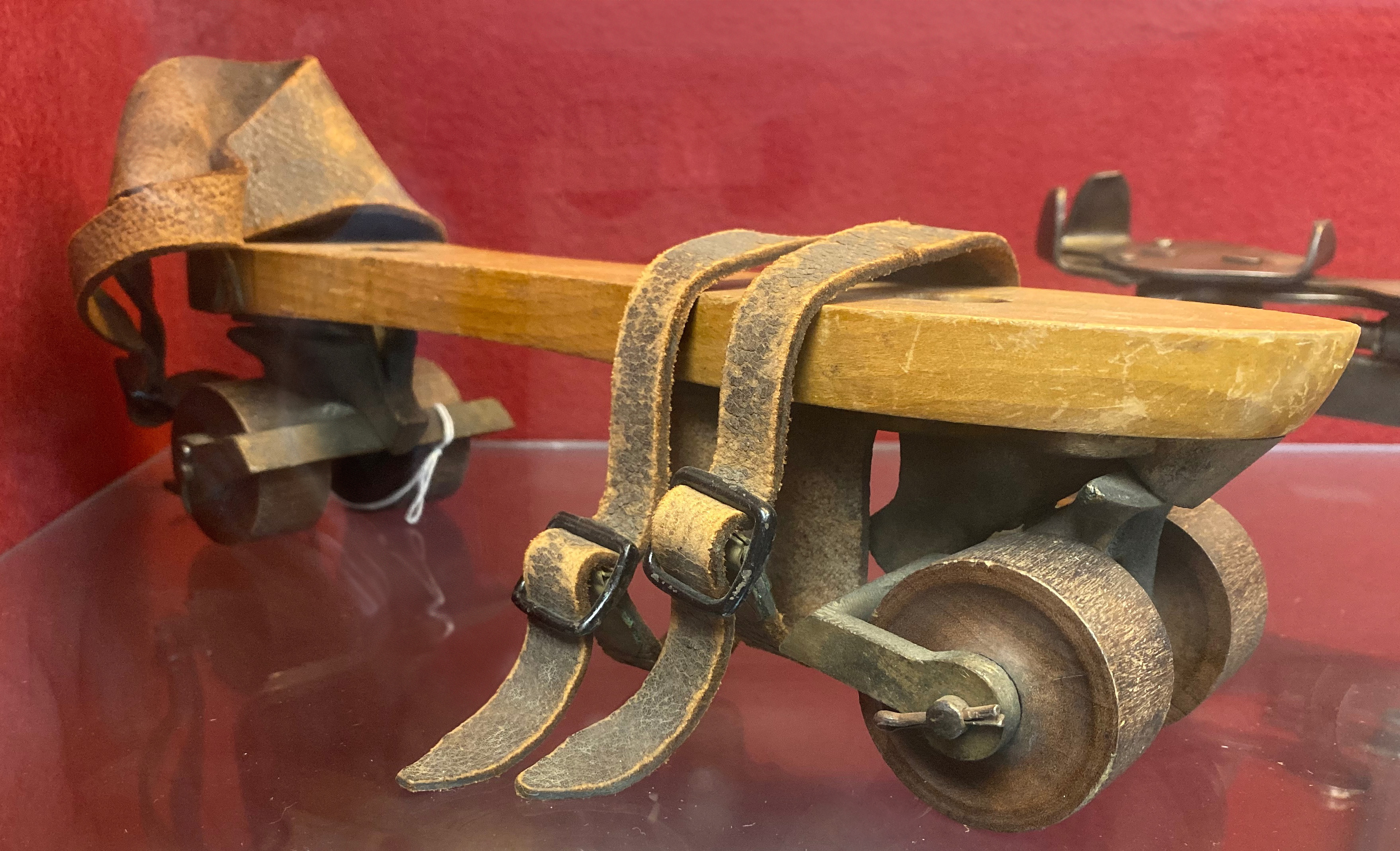
c. 1865 Plimpton Roller Skate prototype, on display in 2018

In 2020, CBS News interviewed the museum's consultant Peggy Young when writing a piece on the resurgence of roller skating during the COVID-19 pandemic.
