= Oumi Janta =

Senegalese-German roller skater (born 1991)

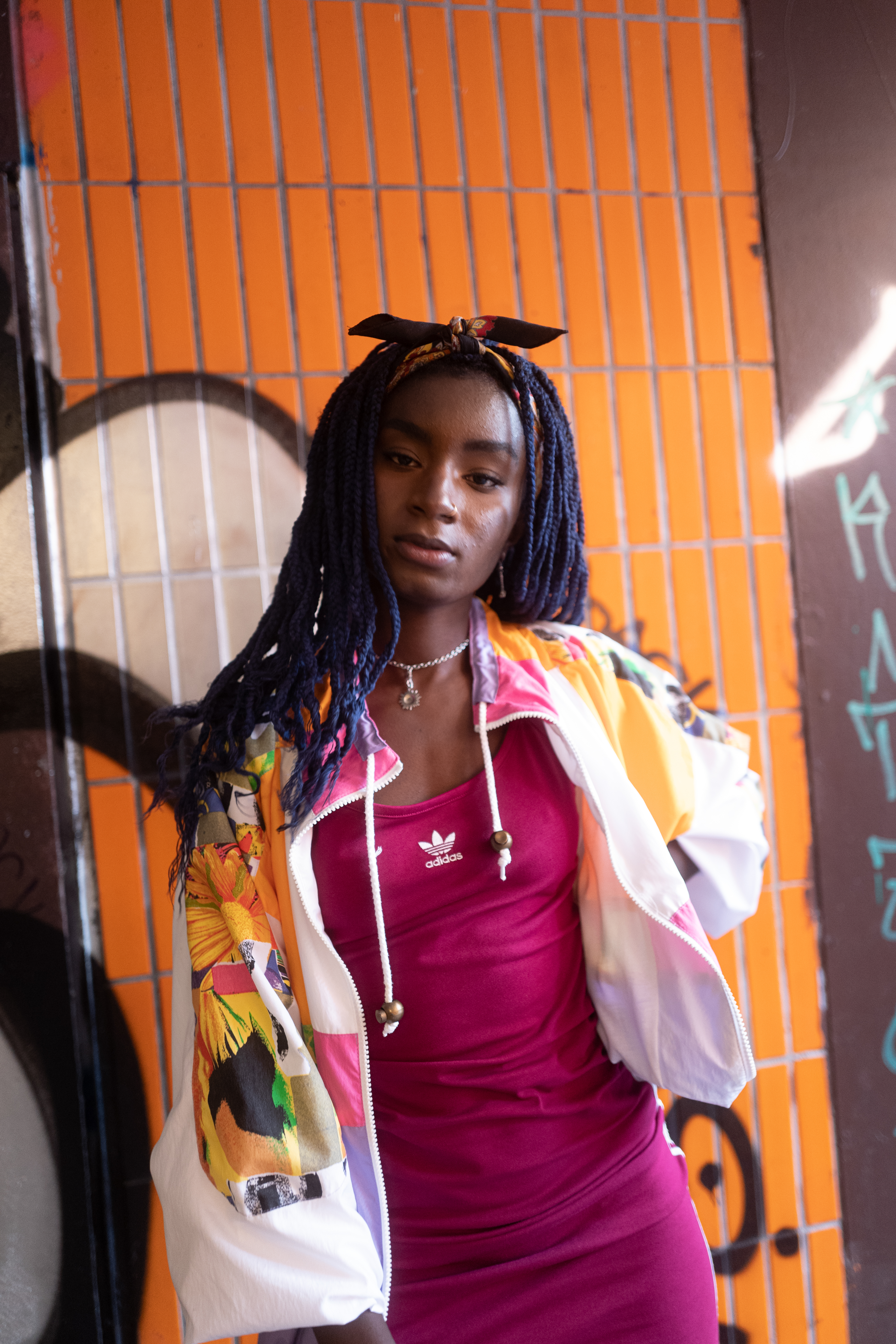
Janta in 2020

Oumi Janta (born 1991) is a Senegalese-born German jam skater and influencer.

Janta was born in Thiès, Senegal, and moved to Berlin, Germany, with her parents as an infant. She grew up in Steglitz, before moving to Neukölln with her family. As a child, Janta was a fan of figure skating. After studying industrial design at the University of Applied Sciences in Berlin, she initially worked as an eyewear designer. Taking up roller skating to escape ennui in her work, she became part of a community based at Tempelhofer Feld in Berlin. Janta was inspired by Surya Bonaly.

In 2020, an Instagram video of Janta went viral and was eventually viewed by more than 3 million people. Janta subsequently left her office job to work in skating and other creative areas full-time, founding a Jam Skate Club in Berlin and teaching roller skating to others. She also works as a model. Janta has been credited with being part of a 2020s revival of interest in roller skating and jam skating. Interest in the revival has been particularly strong among black women.
