= Empire Roller Disco =

Roller rink in Brooklyn, New York (1941–2007)

Coordinates: 40°39′48″N 73°57′19″W

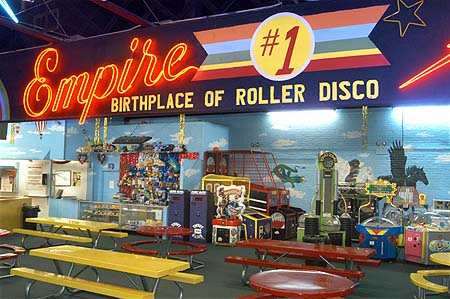
The Empire Roller Rink in 2006

The Empire Roller Disco (1941–2007) was a 30,000-square-foot roller rink located at 200 Empire Blvd., in the Crown Heights neighborhood of Brooklyn, New York.

The birthplace of roller disco, it was the first venue to showcase jammin', a skate style invented by its attendee and employee Bill "Mr. Charisma" Butler.

== History ==
In 1941, the Swanson family opened the Empire Roller Skating Center in a former garage across the street from Ebbets Field. By the 1940s, the rink (renamed as the Brooklyn Rollerdome) hosted skate and beauty contests in addition to regular skate sessions.

In 1956, Henry and Hector Abrami became the new owners and operators. Empire Rollerdrome's slogan, appearing on a postcard, was "Home of the 'Miracle Maple'". This referred to its special maple wood flooring, which created a smooth surface for roller skaters.

In the 1960s, roller skating choreographer Bill Butler created a new style of roller skating called jammin', involving complex choreography. Skater Gloria McCarthy, whose father owned the rink, started a "Bounce" night to showcase Charisma's new style.

In the 1970s, the rink became the Empire Roller Disco, transitioning from an organ to a sound system operated by a disc jockey designed by audio engineer Richard Long (also the designer of the sound systems for the Warehouse, Paradise Garage, Club Zanzibar).

By 1979, Butler became the rink's instructor, performer, and creative consultant. A photograph shows Butler at a Casablanca Records party at Empire, instructing Cher by leading her by the hand. His "stylish tricks...made the [Empire Roller Disco] a HOT destination", as it "drew storied celebrities away from the snooty uptown clubs (Studio 54) down to the warm & accepting Brooklyn Rink". The most notable celebrity guest was Cher, who hosted Billboard's Disco Forum skate party at the Empire Roller Disco that year. She also hosted the Billboard Magazine Disco Forum skate party at the Empire Roller Disco.

Gloria Abrami McCarthy operated the rink from 1980-1998. From 1998-2007, United Skates of America operated the rink.

In April 2007, Empire Roller Disco closed permanently.

== Legacy ==
Roller skater Bill "Mr. Charisma" Butler is credited with introducing and popularizing the roller skating dance styles of jamming known as "roller rocking" and "Brooklyn Bounce" at Empire in the late 1950s to the 1980s.

The City Reliquary praised the rink's cultural impact in a 2023 exhibit:

[In the late '70s and early '80s,] Empire Roller Disco became a cultural epicenter, nurturing skating styles and hosting competitions that launched the careers of many skating legends such as Maurice Gatewood, Roger Green, and Pat the Cat! It also served as a breeding ground for DJ superstars and propelled the rink to unprecedented heights. One of the biggest stars was DJ Big Bob (Robert Clayton), an icon in the Skate Music scene and a renowned skater himself.

Celebrities such as Prince, Grace Jones, Madonna, and Olivia Newton-John have visited Empire to skate.

Skate DJs at Empire popularized roller skating to R&B, disco, and hip hop. Notable skate DJ Big Bob (Robert Clayton) worked at Empire for over 20 years.
