= Bounce, Rock, Skate, Roll =

Single by Vaughan Mason & Crew

from the album Bounce, Rock, Skate, Roll
- Released: 1979
- Genre: Funk, disco
- Length: 12-inch single: 7:30 (Part 1); 7:10 (Part 2); Album: 3:40 (I); 5:15 (II)
- Label: Brunswick Records
- Songwriters: Gregory Bufford; Jerome Bell; Vaughan Mason

"Bounce, Rock, Skate, Roll" is a song by the American funk group Vaughan Mason & Crew that capitalized on the roller disco fad of the late 1970s. Released in the summer of 1979, the single reached number 5 on the US Billboard Hot Soul Singles and number 38 on Billboard's Disco Top 100 chart in 1980. It was inspired by the bassline in the song "Good Times" by Chic, also released in summer 1979.

It has since been used as the inspiration for the title of the film Roll Bounce, and appears on its soundtrack.

In 1991 Zero-G used parts of the drumloop on one of their sample CDs and was then used on the Daft Punk songs, "Daftendirekt", "WDPK.83.7.FM" and their 1995 single "Da Funk".
