= United Skates of America =

American roller skating rink chain

- Founded: 1971
- Number of locations: 12 (2024)
- Key people: Jim Dvorak (chairman); Karen Palermo (CEO and president)

United Skates of America, Inc. is a national roller skating rink chain founded in 1971. As of 2024, it is headquartered in Columbus, Ohio. It operates 12 family entertainment centers in Arizona, California, Florida, Illinois, Indiana, Michigan, North Carolina, New Jersey, New York, Ohio, and Rhode Island.

As of 2023, its president is Karen Palermo and its chairman is Jim Dvorak.

== History ==
In 1971, a 31-year-old Norman L. Traeger founded United Skates of America Inc., described by USSEC as "a chain of family fun centers". Traeger served as president until at least 1983, when the NY Appellate Division ruled in favor of United Skates to purchase 71-17 Roosevelt Avenue, Queens (formerly Indoor Skateboard Center, Inc.).

The United Skates Roller Rink in Seaford, New York opened in 1978.

Former president and current chairman Jim Dvorak joined the company in 1980.

In 1989, Dvorak was charged with a RICO conspiracy regarding alcohol sales, but was acquitted of all charges by Judge Marvin Aspen.

In 2003, The Wall Street Journal advertised Dvorak's request that the company was seeking a new president, after which Dvorak would become chairman. Dvorak described that the six-figure presidential position relies on travel due to the importance of local marketing, and that no rollerskate experience is required, although the position guarantees "free Rollerblades for life" and "[a]ll the cotton candy you can eat". At the time, it operated 18 roller skating centers in 9 states, with a staff of 50 full-time employees and 500 part-timers.

USA has purchased shuttered rinks in order to refurbish and reopen them. In 2023, Dvorak travelled from Ohio to New Jersey to attend the ribbon cutting of the USA's recently-acquired Jackson Skating Center. Formerly called Rollermagic (1978 - 2022), the facility had closed the previous year. Like other USA facilities, the reopening involved removing alcoholic beverage sales; gutting the building; affixing new carpeting; and adding new glow-in-the-dark airbrushed murals, blacklight fixtures, laser lighting displays, and an updated sound system. The new USA location also included "skate mates" for children; these are plastic devices similar to mobility walkers which enable beginners or young children to skate independently. Local newspaper Jersey Shore Online reported an overall positive response from longtime attenders of the former Rollermagic rink.

As of 2024, the rinks host summer camps, birthday parties, STEM/ExL educational field trips, corporate events, DJed adult skate nights, and public events.

== Locations ==
Arizona

- Great Skate in Glendale
- USA's Skateland in Chandler
- USA's Skateland in Mesa

California

- United Skates of America in Clovis

Florida

- United Skates of America in Tampa
- Skate World in Tampa

Illinois

- MLK Skating in Chicago

Indiana

- Skateland in Indianapolis

MIchigan

- United Skates of America in Lincoln Park

North Carolina

- United Skates of America in Raleigh
- Wheels in Durham

New Jersey

- Millennium Skate World in Camden
- Branch Brook Park Roller Skating Center in Newark
- United Skates of America in Jackson

New York

- United Skates of America in Seaford

Ohio

- Zelma Watson George Skating in Cleveland
- United Skates of America in Wickliffe
- Skate Zone 71 in Columbus
- United Skates of America in Columbus

Rhode Island

- United Skates of America in Rumford

== See also ==
- Roller disco, a dance-focused roller skating rink
- Roller Boogie, a 1979 film that popularized roller skating culture
