= Millennium Complex =

Building in the United Kingdom

Coordinates: 50°22′11.8″N 4°09′00.5″W

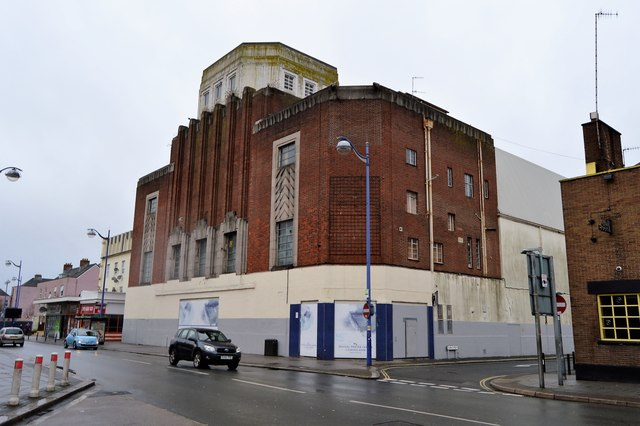
Pictured in 2017 during its conversion into a prayer centre

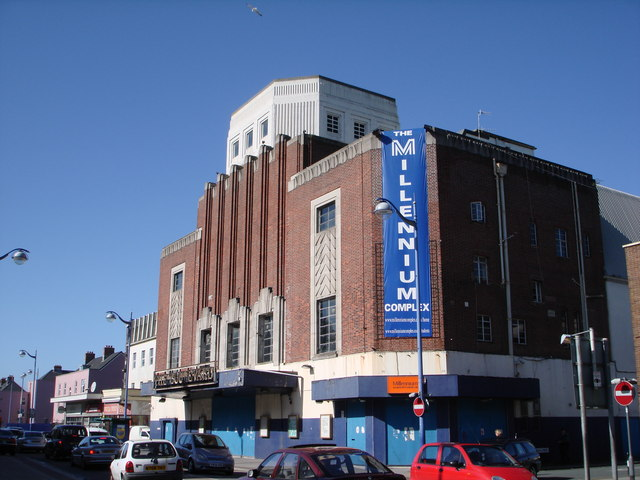
In 2007

The Millennium Complex is a structure in Plymouth, England, built as a cinema in 1931. As the Gaumont Palace it provided a 2,250-seat single screen. In 1962 the stalls were converted into a dance hall, The Majestic, reducing the cinema, then operated by Odeon, to a capacity of 1,043. Both businesses closed in 1980 with the site becoming home to a roller disco. This also closed in 1987 when it was converted into a night club which operated under various names until its closure in 2004.

The site was purchased by KHH Ltd in 2007, with plans to convert it into flats, these were halted by the Great Recession. In 2013 the religious broadcaster GOD TV entered into a 25-year lease on the complex, intending to convert it into a conference centre. Conversion works were slow and in 2019 the company terminated its lease. In 2020 the site was acquired by a joint venture between Nudge Community Builders, a community benefit society, and creative workspace developer Eat Work Art. The parties have applied for planning permission to convert part of the site into business units for small manufacturers.

== History ==
=== Cinema ===
The building, located at 151 Union Street, was built as the Gaumont Palace cinema. It was designed by architect William Henry Watkins of Bristol, who worked on more than 300 cinemas across the country. Built in the art deco style it held 1,460 seats in the stalls and 790 in the circle. The Gaumont Palace was formally opened on 16 November 1931 by the Mayor of Plymouth, Alderman George Dymond, and the member of parliament for Plymouth Sutton Lady Nancy Astor. The first film shown was the comedy thriller The Ghost Train.

The cinema was renamed as the Gaumont in 1937. It operated throughout the Plymouth Blitz in the Second World War, except for a brief closure in March and April 1941, at the peak of the German bombing. The cinema closed for remodelling in December 1961. It reopened in September 1962 as the Top Rank Entertainment Centre. The stalls were covered over and converted into a dance hall named the Majestic. The circle was converted into a smaller cinema, operated by Odeon, with a 1,043 capacity. The existing Odeon cinema in the city was closed two days before the new cinema in the Top Rank Entertainment Centre was opened. The complex closed in April 1980.

=== Night club ===
The building was converted into a roller disco and amusement arcade, reopening in December 1980.

This also closed and the space converted to a night club and live music venue in 1987, soon becoming a rave venue in March 1990. As a night club it had a capacity of around 1,800. Inside it had four respective clubs: Club Oz (also known as The Warehouse) in the main hall, Monroe’s (or later Blondz), the Studio and Sgt. Pepper's. The Ramones and Talking Heads played there in 1977.

During its time as a rave club, many local and national companies such as Wasp Factory, Alpha, Essense, Cultural Vibes, Dance Planet and Scream organised and hosted nights there every weekend. DJs such as Carl Cox, Judge Jules, The Ragga Twins, Dave Pearse, Sasha, Grooverider, Boy George and Aphex Twin have played there. It was one of the busiest and successful rave nightclubs in the South West, bringing up to 2,500 people on Friday and Saturday nights from across Plymouth, Cornwall and Devon, way beyond its legal capacity.

In September 1998, it was closed as a rave club and bought by Luminar, turning it into The Millennium and The Boulevard clubs until its closure in 2004.

The building's rave history was also part of a 2025 short documentary W: A Return to Oz, directed by local filmmaker Daniel Howard-Baker.

=== Closure and redevelopment ===
The night club closed in August 2004. The structure, now known as the Millennium Complex, was added to Historic England's at risk register soon afterwards.

The complex was purchased in February 2007 for £1.5 million by KHH Ltd who planned to convert it into flats and student accommodation. The conversion was halted by the Great Recession of 2007–2009. In 2013 the religious broadcaster GOD TV entered into a 25-year lease on the complex, with planning permission granted to convert it into a conference centre named the Revival Prayer Centre. In September 2013 a leaking gas pipe at the venue caused the evacuation of 300 people from nearby buildings and the closure of Union Street. A man, with no connection to the GOD TV project, was jailed in September 2015 on fraud charges, having persuaded investors to give him money on the pretence that he was going to open a night club on the site.

Conversion works missed an initial target of completion in 2015 and by January 2016 work on the site had ceased. At this point GOD TV claimed the works were forecast to complete in 2018/2019. In 2016 GOD TV were served with a clean-up notice by Plymouth City Council, works were carried out to comply with the notice but little progress was made with the conversion. Planning permission was extended in 2017 to allow the works to complete by 2020. In October 2018 the club was reopened for a one night art and music exhibition by the Atlantic Project, a city-wide art project. The first part of the night was an exhibition of short films on the Atlantic Project, history, cinema and the future of Union Street. The second part was a performance by Kraftwerk founder Eberhard Kranemann and others.

In January 2019 GOD TV announced it was no longer proceeding with the conversion, having reached agreement with KKH to terminate the lease. By this time KKH was owned by businessman and philanthropist Sir David Kirch. GOD TV's annual rent on the lease was £40,000, and had been set to rise to £50,000. At this point GOD TV considered there was around £5 million of work remaining to complete the project. They had attempted, but failed, to find a partner to help fund completion or to secure an alternative tenant for the building.

In September 2020 the building was bought by Nudge Community Builders, a community benefit society, and art-focused developer Eat Work Art for £800,000. The organisations had each hoped to purchase the whole structure but agreed to develop the project as a 50/50 joint venture. A £4 million redevelopment was commenced with plans to provide business units for small manufacturers and a 1,500 capacity music venue. Nudge Community Builders raised some funds for the conversion through a community share programme with small investors pledging between £50 and £10,000. The conversion was to be carried out in stages with the first phase focussing on the business units, the second phase on public facilities such as toilets and an art gallery and a third phase in which the provision of a cafe-bar/music venue. The funding reached its £285,000 target with just hours before a deadline on 20 December 2021, raising £296,125 from 453 investors. Planning permission for the business units were applied for in October 2022. Whilst awaiting development the building has been used to host events and for the filming of music videos.
