= James Leonard Plimpton =

American inventor

James Leonard Plimpton (1828, Medfield, Massachusetts - 1911) was an American inventor who is known for changing the skating world with his patented roller skates in 1863. Plimpton's roller skates were safer and easier to use than the existing versions, his "rocker skates" or quad skates allowed people to steer by simply leaning to the left or the right. He also opened some of the earliest roller skating rinks in New York City and Newport, Rhode Island. In addition to opening the first, official, roller skating rink he also established the first roller skating club, that included rules of roller skating rink conduct, with how to roller skate lessons, and proficiency tests for skaters to plot their progress.

James Plimpton also invented the Plimpton cabinet bed. He married Harriet Amelia Adams on December 6, 1852.

== See also ==
- National Museum of Roller Skating
