= Roll Bounce =

2005 film by Malcolm D. Lee

- Theatrical release poster
- Directed by: Malcolm D. Lee
- Written by: Norman Vance Jr.
- Produced by: Tyrone D. Dixon; Dana Reid; Adam Robinson; Jeremiah Samuels; Robert Teitel; George Tillman Jr.
- Starring: Bow Wow; Chi McBride; Mike Epps; Wesley Jonathan; Meagan Good; Nick Cannon
- Cinematography: J. Michael Muro
- Edited by: George Bowers; Paul Millspaugh
- Music by: Stanley Clarke
- Production companies: Fox 2000 Pictures; State Street Pictures
- Distributed by: Fox Searchlight Pictures
- Release date: September 23, 2005
- Running time: 112 minutes
- Country: United States
- Language: English
- Budget: $10 million
- Box office: $17.5 million

Roll Bounce is a 2005 American comedy-drama film written by Norman Vance Jr. and directed by Malcolm D. Lee. The film stars hip hop artist Bow Wow as the leader of a roller skating crew in 1970s Chicago. The film also includes Nick Cannon, Meagan Good, Brandon T. Jackson, Wesley Jonathan, Chi McBride, Kellita Smith, Jurnee Smollett and Mike Epps. The name of the film is derived from the 1979 song "Bounce, Rock, Skate, Roll" by Vaughan Mason & Crew.

Roll Bounce was released by Fox Searchlight Pictures on September 23, 2005. The film received mixed to positive reviews from critics and grossed $17.5 million against a $10 million budget.

== Plot ==
In 1978 Chicago, after the local roller rink the "Palisade Garden" closes down, 16-year-old Xavier Curtis Smith (known as 'X') and his friends Junior, Boo, Naps, “Mixed” Mike, along with his new neighbor Tori, spend their summer roller skating in the ritzy uptown rink "Sweetwater" where they are disrespected by the five-year roller disco contest champions Sweetness and his crew, the Sweetwater Rollers. The five enter the end of summer skating contest themselves to earn their place at the rink. Xavier also reconnects with an old crush, Naomi.

Xavier's home life is strained after the death of his mother, leaving his father Curtis struggling to take care of Xavier and his sister Sonya while restoring his late wife's car. Curtis finds Xavier's skating a waste of time and prefers him to be at home taking care of chores. Unbeknownst to Xavier and Sonya, Curtis lost his job as an aerospace engineer and has had to take a job as a janitor. Curtis connects with Tori's mother Vivian, who was initially hostile for Curtis taking Tori to the roller rink with Xavier without Vivian's permission. In the city with his group, Xavier learns about his father's unemployment when he finds his car for sale, the car salesman tells him all. At Sweetwater, Xavier also wrongfully lashes out at Naomi.

Going home, Xavier confronts Curtis. The two argue. Xavier smashes the windows of his late mother's car in a rage, before both he and Curtis break down in tears. Following days of keeping distance, Xavier opens a package addressed to Curtis, which are a pair of new skates for Xavier. His current skates, a gift from his mother, have begun to break down. Curtis realizes he was hurting so much from his wife's death that he neglected Xavier and Sonya, and he promises to be a more attentive father. Xavier makes amends with Naomi as well.

At the skating competition, Xavier and his team "the Garden Boys" are ready to go. Alongside his family and Vivian in attendance, Tori, whom the guys had ridiculed for having braces before she had them removed, has a whole new makeover from her previous tomboy look. Many skaters compete, X's team are set to go last against the Sweetwater Rollers. The rivals steal their original song choice "Le Freak" but Naps manages to find the song "Hollywood Swinging" as a suitable replacement. X's team pulls it off, praised by the entire rink for their routine. For the first time in the history of the competition, the final two teams tie for first place; the Rollers & the Garden Boys. Unable to accept the decision, Sweetness challenges Xavier to a one-on-one skate-off with no falls.

Sweetness & Xavier battle to multiple songs to the roar of the crowd. On his last song "He's the Greatest Dancer", Xavier quietly dedicates the round to his mother. Xavier throws out every move he knows and is set to win when he attempts a triple Lutz jump but falls and loses the competition. Helped up by his father, Xavier has earned the respect of Sweetness and the audience. Xavier and Naomi share a kiss, while Junior shares one with Tori. Sometime later, everyone skates together at Sweetwater.

== Cast ==
- Bow Wow as Xavier Curtis "X" Smith
- Chi McBride as Curtis Smith
- Mike Epps as Byron
- Wesley Jonathan as "Sweetness"
- Kellita Smith as Vivian
- Meagan Good as Naomi Phillips
- Khleo Thomas as Mike "Mixed Mike"
- Nick Cannon as "Be-Nard"
- Jurnee Smollett as Tori
- Marcus T. Paulk as "Boo"
- Brandon T. Jackson as Junior
- Rick Gonzalez as "Naps"
- Paul Wesley as Troy
- Wayne Brady as D.J. Johnny
- Charlie Murphy as Victor
- Darryl McDaniels as D.J. Smooth Dee

== Reception ==
Roll Bounce received mixed to positive reviews from critics. As of June 2020, the film holds a 66% approval rating on Rotten Tomatoes, based on 90 reviews with an average rating of 6.00/10. The website's critics consensus reads: "Roll Bounce dazzles us with a classic late 1970's feel, but this coming of age film could have been more than just a spin around the roller rink."

== Soundtrack ==
Roll Bounce: The Album

Soundtrack album by various artists
- Released: September 20, 2005
- Genre: R&B; funk; soul; disco
- Length: 53:17
- Label: Sanctuary

Singles from Roll Bounce: The Album
- 1. "Wishing on a Star" Released: September 2005

Roll Bounce: The Album was released on September 20, 2005, by Sanctuary Urban Records Group.

=== Overview ===
The soundtrack features artists such as Keith Sweat, Foxy, Chaka Khan, Beyoncé, Earth, Wind & Fire, Fabolous, Yo-Yo, Michelle Williams, Bill Withers, Chic, Jamiroquai, Kool & the Gang and Vaughan Mason & Crew.

No.	Title	Performer	Length
1.	"Boogie Oogie Oogie"	Brooke Valentine, Fabolous and Yo-Yo	4:08
2.	"Bounce, Rock, Skate, Roll"	Vaughan Mason & Crew	5:29
3.	"Pure Gold"	Earth, Wind & Fire	4:01
4.	"Wishing on a Star"	Beyoncé	4:08
5.	"Quit Actin'"	Ray J, R. Kelly and Shorty Mack	3:58
6.	"Superman Lover"	Johnny "Guitar" Watson	5:42
7.	"Hollywood Swinging"	Kool & the Gang	4:13
8.	"Let's Stay Together"	Michelle Williams	3:24
9.	"Lovely Day"	Bill Withers	4:13
10.	"I Wanna Know Your Name"	Keith Sweat	4:11
11.	"Get Off"	Foxy	5:40
12.	"Le Freak"	Chic	4:16
Total length:			41:09

Other songs in the film include

- "Flash Light" - Parliament
- "Emotion" - Samantha Sang
- "Can You Feel the Force?" - The Real Thing
- "Love to Love You Baby" - Donna Summer
- "I'll Keep Loving You" - Carl Douglas
- "Barracuda" - Heart
- "Rock the Boat" - The Hues Corporation
- "Baby Hold On" - Eddie Money
- "On the Beautiful Blue Danube" - Royal Philharmonic Orchestra
- "Kung Fu Fighting" - Carl Douglas
- "I'm Your Boogie Man" - KC and the Sunshine Band
- "Let's Roll" - Chaka Khan
- "Easy" - Commodores
- "For All We Know" - Donny Hathaway
- "Boogie Fever" - The Sylvers
- "Pick Up the Pieces" - Average White Band
- "Fire" - Ohio Players
- "He's the Greatest Dancer" - Sister Sledge
- "Baby Come Back" - Player

== Awards and nominations ==
Year	Show	Category	Recipient	Result
2006	Black Movie Awards	Outstanding Achievement in Directing	Malcolm D. Lee	Nominated
2006	Black Movie Awards	Outstanding Achievement in Screenwriting	Norman Vance, Jr.	Nominated
2006	Black Reel Awards	Best Breakthrough Performance	Brandon T. Jackson	Winner
2006	Black Reel Awards	Best Screenplay, Original or Adapted	Norman Vance, Jr.	Winner
2006	Black Reel Awards	Best Ensemble Award	Jurnee Smollett	Nominated
2006	Black Reel Awards	Best Director	Malcolm D. Lee	Nominated
2006	Black Reel Awards	Best Original Soundtrack	N/A	Nominated

== See also ==
- 1970s nostalgia
