= Roller rink =

Hard surface used for roller skating or inline skating

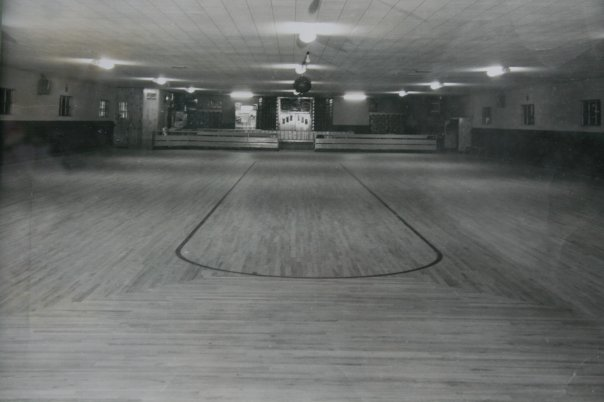
Leo's Roller Rink, a typical American roller rink of the 1950s and 1960s, located in Kirksville, Missouri

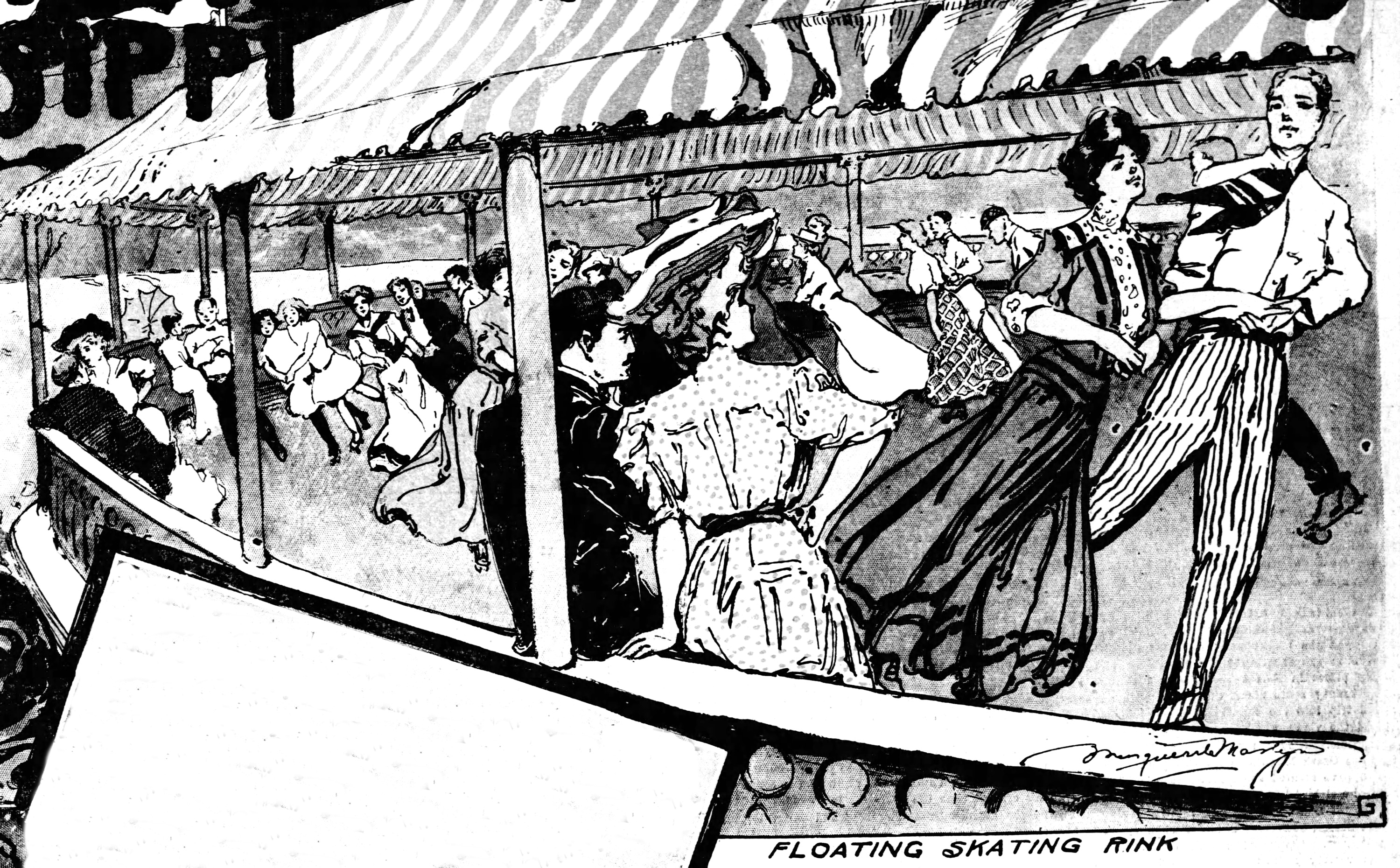
Illustration by journalist Marguerite Martyn of a roller rink on an Illinois River boat, out of Peoria, published August 19, 1906, in the St. Louis Post-Dispatch

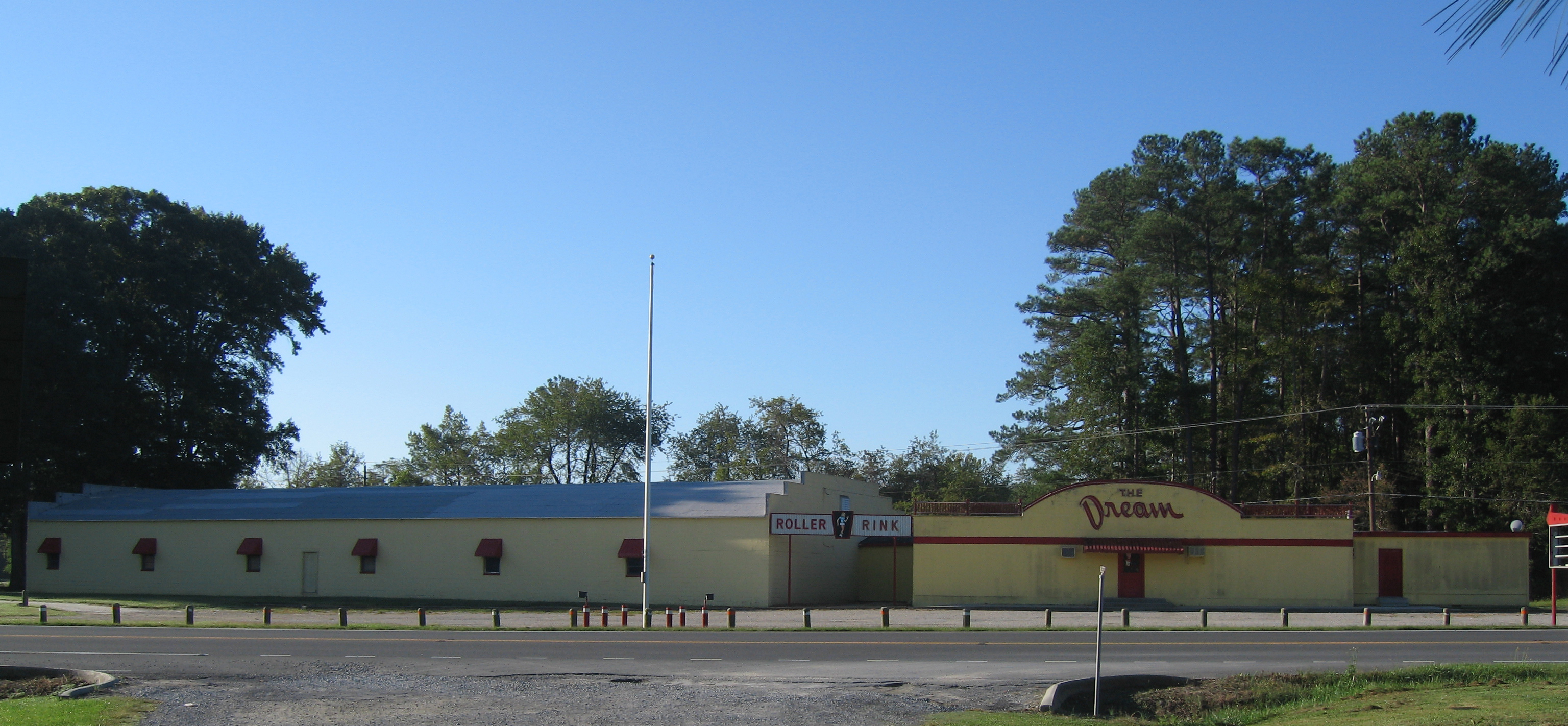
Dream Roller Rink in New Church, Virginia

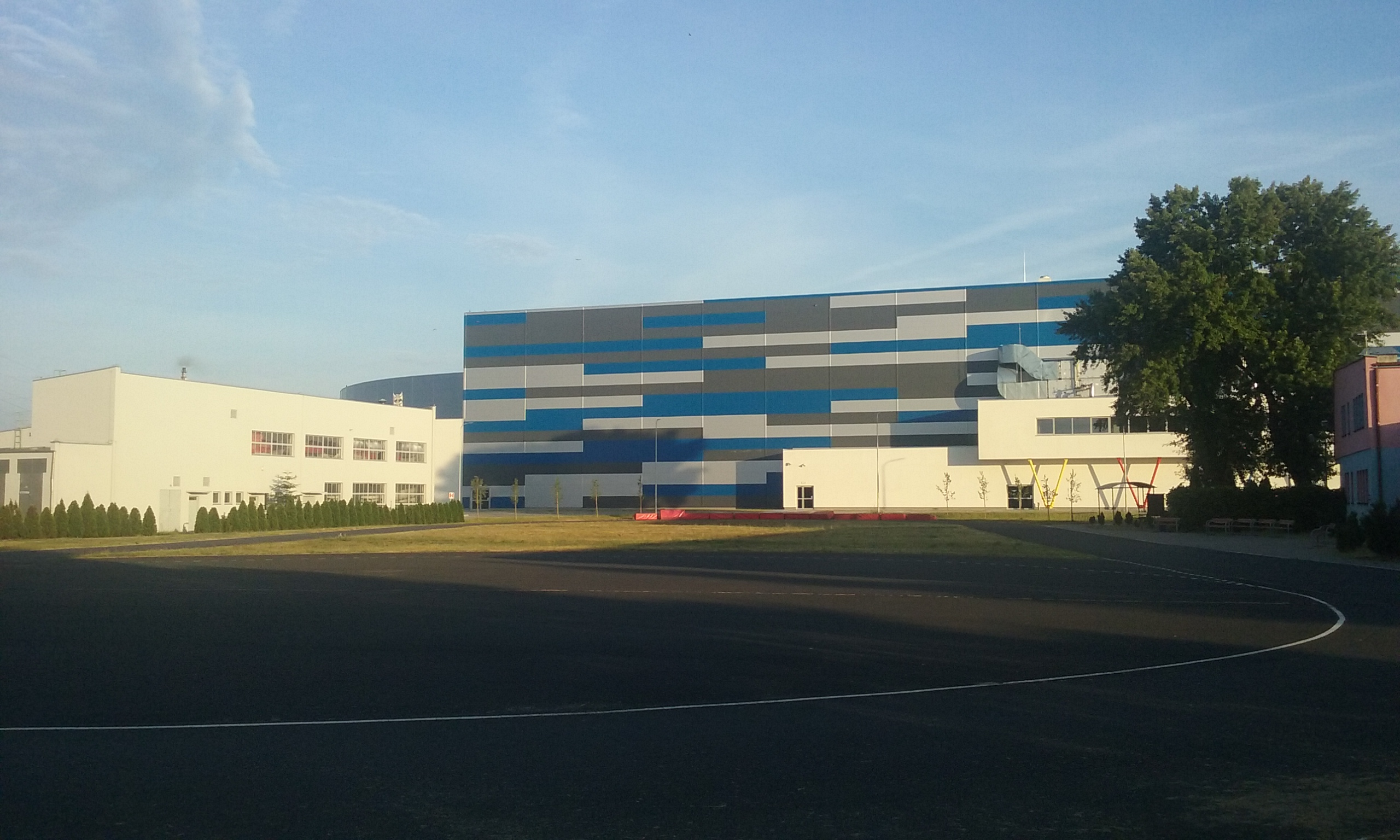
Public roller skating rink behind Ice Arena Tomaszów Mazowiecki in Poland

A roller rink (or roller skating rink) is a hard surface usually consisting of hardwood or concrete, used for roller skating or inline skating. This includes roller hockey, speed skating, roller derby, and individual recreational skating. Roller rinks can be located in an indoor or outdoor facility. Most skating center facilities range anywhere from under 14,000 square feet (1,300 m^{2}) to more than 21,000 square feet (2,000 m^{2}).

== History ==
Massachusetts businessman James Plimpton's 1863 invention of an improved roller skate led to a boom in popularity in the late 19th century, particularly in cities of the American East Coast. At first, people roller skated at home, but within twenty years businesses dedicated to the activity began to spring up. Plimpton himself is credited with opening the first roller skating rink in New York City. Patrons who enjoyed ice skating during the winter months participated in the similar activity, now year-round. Early roller rinks varied greatly in size and type, both indoor and outdoor. Many consisted of simple wooden platforms that sometimes doubled as dance floors or ballrooms. While primarily an activity of eastern cities, a few enterprising individuals toured the rural areas of the Midwest and South with wagon-loads of roller skates. These entrepreneurs went from town-to-town, often in conjunction with circuses or carnivals, renting out skates and using whatever locally available surface as an impromptu rink. The post–World War II baby boom also saw a boom in roller rinks across the United States. Having a roller skating birthday party became something of a rite of passage for American children in the 1950s, 1960s, 1970s, and 1980s. Roller rinks in the United States underwent significant changes in the 1970s. New plastics led to improved skate wheels—ones providing a smoother, quieter ride—and easier-to-maintain skate floors.

The disco craze from popular 1970s culture led to another increase in the popularity of roller rinks—or roller discos, as some became. Gone were the staid lighting and old-fashioned organ music as a generally older clientele were replaced by adolescents and twenty-somethings skating under mirror balls and special lights to disco beats. The end of the Disco Era and the advent of inline roller skates hit the roller rink industry hard, with many rinks closing. However, as had happened earlier, most rink owners adapted and survived the economic storm. Roller derby, a professional sport of the 1950s and 1960s once considered virtually dead, has seen a DIY, grassroots rebirth in popularity in the early 21st century with amateur and semi-pro teams forming leagues nationwide. Many rink owners support this activity, along with roller hockey, speed skating, and roller figure skating contests.

== General references ==
- The History Of Roller Skating by James Turner & Michael Zaidman, published by the National Museum Of Roller Skating, 1997.
- Heaven On Wheels by R.W. Anderson, self-published, 2005.
