= Roller disco =

Skating rink for dancing on roller skates

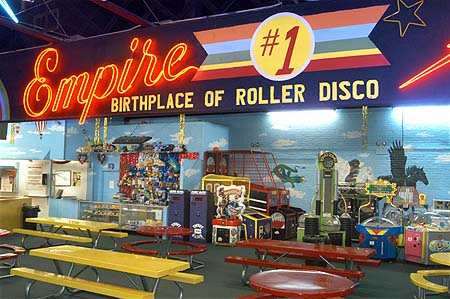
New York's Empire Roller Rink, considered the birthplace of roller disco

A roller disco is a combined discothèque and skating rink, where attendees are encouraged to participate in roller skating while dancing, or to observe skilled dancers from the sidelines. Quad skates and (more recently) inline skates may be available for rent, and there is often a snack bar with a seating area.

Traditionally, roller discos employ a live disc jockey and incorporate complex sound systems, lighting effects, neon lights, fog machines, traffic lights, disco balls, and sometimes a separate illuminated dance floor. These decorations offer "exhilarating experiences" and allude to a "vibrant urban subculture" in a way that regular roller rinks do not. Roller disco music is usually highly rhythmic and danceable; historically, it falls within the disco genre, but almost any form of dance, pop, house, R&B, or rock music is commonly played.

Historically, roller disco events have included disco song premieres, "roller marathons for charity", "roller disco contests", and "roller fund‐raisers".

== History ==
=== Origin and rise in popularity ===
Roller skating as a hobby originated in the 19th century and peaked in popularity around 1942.

In 1970s Chicago, a "new corps of skaters described themselves as 'JB skaters'", being fans of James Brown's music. The JB skating style consists of "grooves and bounces, fancy footwork, and standing dance routines". Similarly, "bebop" and "soul" skating began in Detroit as organ-driven rinks declined in popularity to make way for skating to rock-and-roll music.

The Empire Skate Center in New York City is credited as the birthplace of roller disco, most notably due to Bill "Mr. Charisma" Butler. The inventor of jam skating and an influencer during the 1979 craze, Butler is today known as the Godfather of Roller Disco.

In 1957, serviceman and rollerskater Bill "Mr. Charisma" Butler visited the Empire Roller Rink, where he found all-black clientele skating to organ music. He encouraged the owners of the Empire Roller Rink to incorporate jazz and R&B vinyls, which would better reflect the cultural preferences of the community. When the disc-jockeyed music proved successful, Butler became a regular attendee, showcasing the new dance technique he had invented in Alaska called jammin' (jam skating). Sometime before the 1970s, Butler convinced skater Gloria McCarthy (whose father owned the Empire Skate Center) to start a "Bounce" night to promote jam skating. By the 1970s, Butler became the rink's instructor, performer, and creative consultant.

Beginning in 1976, the Village Skating rink in Greenwich Village, New York became among the first places to incorporate disco nightclub music in a roller rink setting. Skater Marion Green praised the timing, location, and social environment of the Village Skating, stating that it was "a scene built on the ethics of family and a celebration of diversity, fulfilling the dream of the venue's founder Richard 'Dick' Clammer". Village Skating's DJ Julio Estien (also a skater of the Village Wizards), recalled,

You had all types of people at The Village. It had everyone. Old, young, gay, straight, black and white. I'd play Donna Summer's Macarthur Park, the Star Wars theme [likely the 1977 Meco version], "I'm A Man" by Macho, and of course "Disco Circus" by Martin Circus, that was a huge tune at the time.

In December 1978, The New York Times detailed the concept's influence in Westchester in "Roller Skating + Disco Dancing = Two Hit Rinks", which described the success of Skate City Inc. of Yorktown Heights and Easy Glider in the Baldwin Place Mall. The article begins with a description of the new trend:

Take equal parts roller skating and disco dancing, stir in some flashy lighting and mix with hard, fast music. The result is roller disco, and it is here.

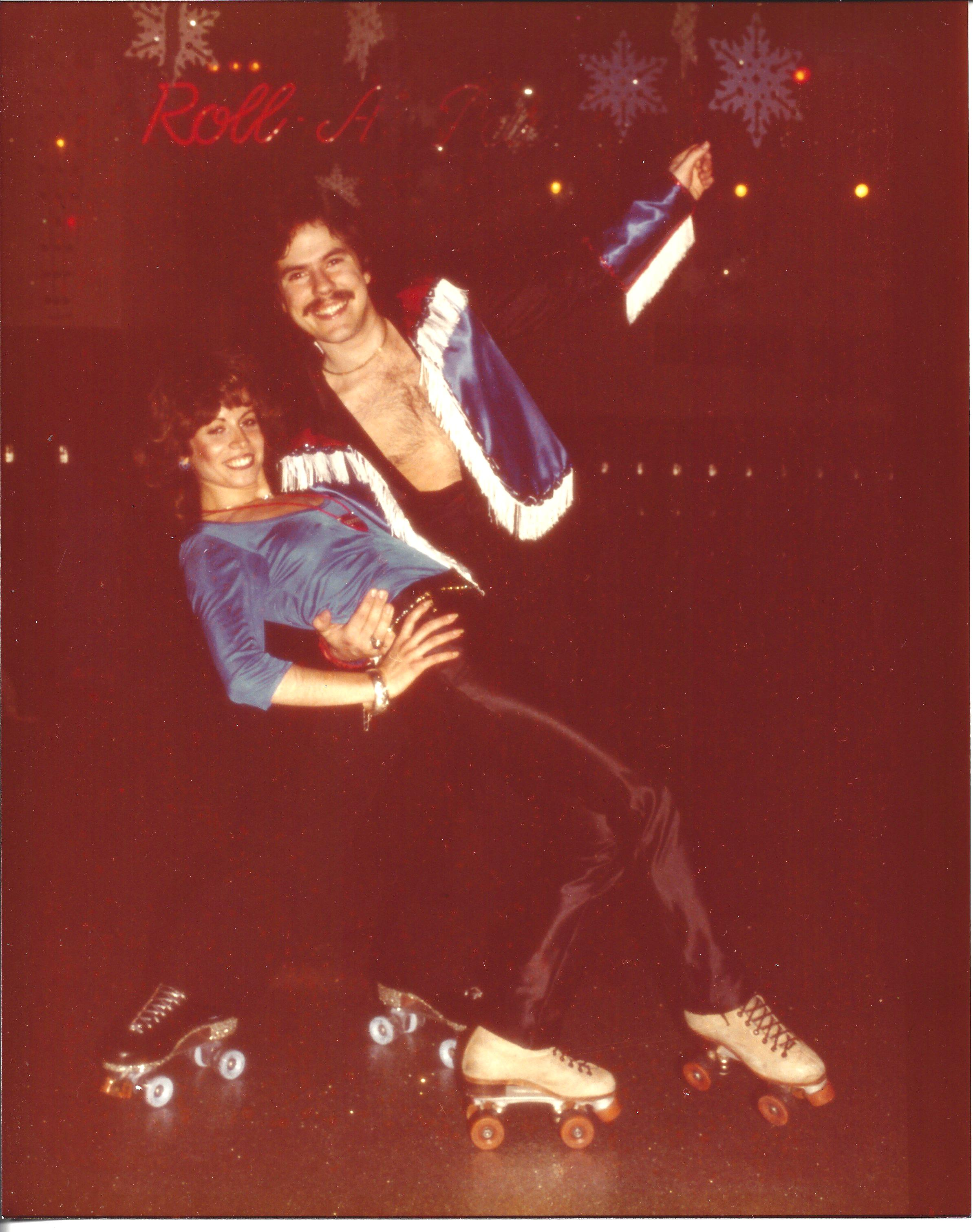
1979 disco skaters in New York, likely at the Sheepshead Roll-A-Palace

=== 1979 craze ===
By 1979, Mr. Charisma's "stylish tricks...made the [Empire Roller Disco] a HOT destination", as it "drew storied celebrities away from the snooty uptown clubs (Studio 54) down to the warm & accepting Brooklyn Rink". Among the most notable was Cher, who hosted Billboard's Disco Forum skate party at the Empire Roller Disco that year. Other celebrities who visited the rink to skate included Prince, Grace Jones, Madonna, and Olivia Newton-John.

Photographs of skaters at Empire are among photographer Bill Bernstein's collection of images that "capture the ecstasy of New York's disco scene".

At the height of the disco craze in 1979, Billboard reported that there were an estimated "5,000 roller rinks in the U.S.," attracting "more than 28 million young American skaters". According to American record producer Ed Chalpin, "99.9% of these rinks" were playing disco music specifically.

"Disco Dip", 1979 promotional song
- Produced by Ed Chalpin, the song was "written and choreographed especially for use as a promotional tool" to popularize the concept of roller discos.
- https://www.youtube.com/watch?v=X6y_qm_XcWU

In March 1979, Brooklyn's Sheepshead Bay Roll-A-Palace was what Billboard called "a typical example" of a disco roller rink. It hosted a variety of events and over 5,000 skaters per weekend during its peak popularity.

Two months later, Bill Butler and Elin Schloen published Jammin': Bill Butler's Complete Guide to Roller Disco. Published by Pocket Books, it contained 114 pages of disco skating instructions written by "the recognized king of the eight-wheeled mania that's taking over the country". Butler detailed how to "keep the beat", turn, stop, jump, how to do "the Anthony Forde walk", as well as describing regional styles, etiquette, safety, rules, and "How to Become a Disco Dazzler in One Minute Flat". The back cover references Gloria Gaynor's 1978 disco single: "You Will Sur-vive. You Will Sur-vive. As Long As You Can Disco-Skate You'll Know That You're Alive!"

By November, Central Michigan University's Kalamazoo News wrote, "Roller disco is hot stuff these days; anybody who's anybody is doing it."

In December, the 1979 musical film Roller Boogie capitalized on the trend, prominently featuring a teenage love story revolving around roller disco. Featuring Linda Blair and award-winning freestyle skater Jim Bray, the plot focuses on a Venice Beach rink's "Roller Boogie contest", which is almost thwarted by the mafia's attempts to close the rink for real estate purposes.

==== Roller disco-themed music ====
In February 1979, Ed Chalpin produced a song titled the "Disco Dip" as a promotional tool to enhance interest in the roller disco hobby. The Kalamazoo News described it as "the pioneering roller disco record", i.e., "the first roller disco record played in a skating rink". The song and dance debuted at Roll-A-Palace, in collaboration with preeminent nationwide disco station WKTU, after which a series of Disco Dip events would follow. Written "especially for use as a promotional tool" to promote interest in the roller disco hobby, the dance/song/event was featured three times in Billboard:

A new dance, the disco dip, designed primarily for use at roller rink discos, will be debuted Tuesday [February 13, 1979] at the Roll-A-Disco in Brooklyn. The dance, with music and lyrics by Ed Chalpin of PTX Enterprises, was written and choreographed especially for use as a promotional tool to stimulate interest in the concept of roller discos. The party is being sponsored jointly by WKTU-FM, New York's leading radio station, and the top disco station in the country, and the management of the Roll-A-Disco rink. WKTU is giving away 500 tickets to members of its listening audience.

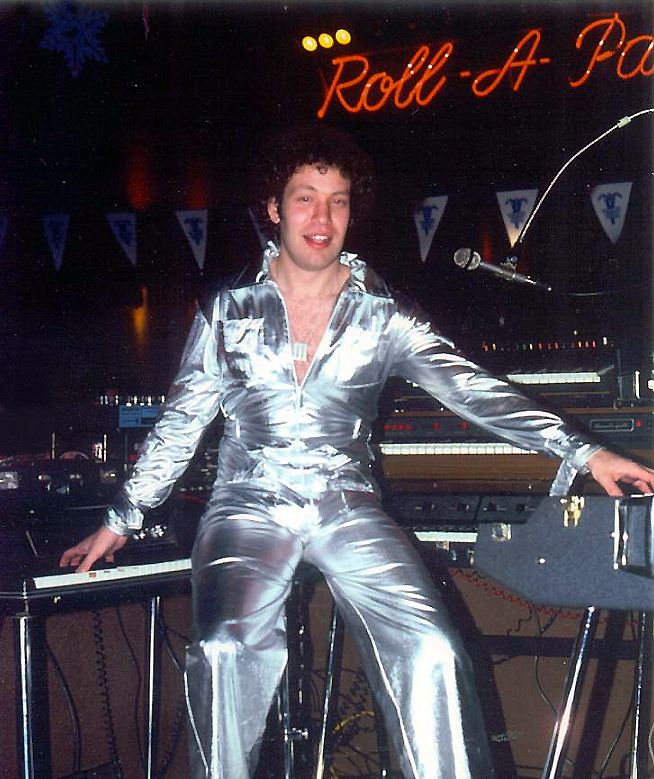
Roller disco performance at Roll-A-Palace, Brooklyn, 1979

However, composer Mark Winter of Astound-A Sound Productions of New Jersey has claimed his song "Roller Palace" was published a day before Chalpin's product, thereby making "Roller Palace" the first roller disco-themed record. Its lyrics humorously describe a "love on wheels" romance at a "disco, disco roller palace" where "everyone rocks as they roll". Winter finished the song in January and performed it in New York prior to the release. Billboard reported in October 1979 that "Roller Palace" was debuted "the day before Chalpin at the Roll-A-Palace in Sheepshead Bay, Brooklyn...The next day the other record was played at the same rink during WKTU-FM's roller party."

"Good Times" by Chic came out on June 4, 1979; it advises listeners to "participate" in "clams on the half-shell and roller skates".

Vaughan Mason & Crew released "Bounce, Rock, Skate, Roll" in the summer of 1979, modeling the song's structure and bassline after "Good Times". Vaughan wrote the song after a trip to the Empire Roller Disco, where he observed teachers telling students, "C'mon, bend at the knees, bounce". He initially planned to name the song the "Vinzerelli Bounce", after Vincent "Vinzerelli" Brown, a popular skater both at the Empire and around New York City. The song title would later inspire the title of 2005 film Roll Bounce.

In October, Cher (who skated with Bill Butler at the Empire Roller Disco) released skate-themed single "Hell on Wheels", also featuring a music video of Cher skating outdoors in a rural community. The song was later featured alongside other disco hits in Roller Boogie and has since been called a "roller-disco anthem".

The first song of The Gap Band's November 1979 album Gap Band II ("Steppin' Out") describes "rollin' on down the floor" with various steps "to the roller boogie, baby".

=== Post-1979 ===
In 1980, the Millennium Complex dance hall in Plymouth, England was closed and converted into a roller disco. It would close in 1987 to reopen as a nightclub.

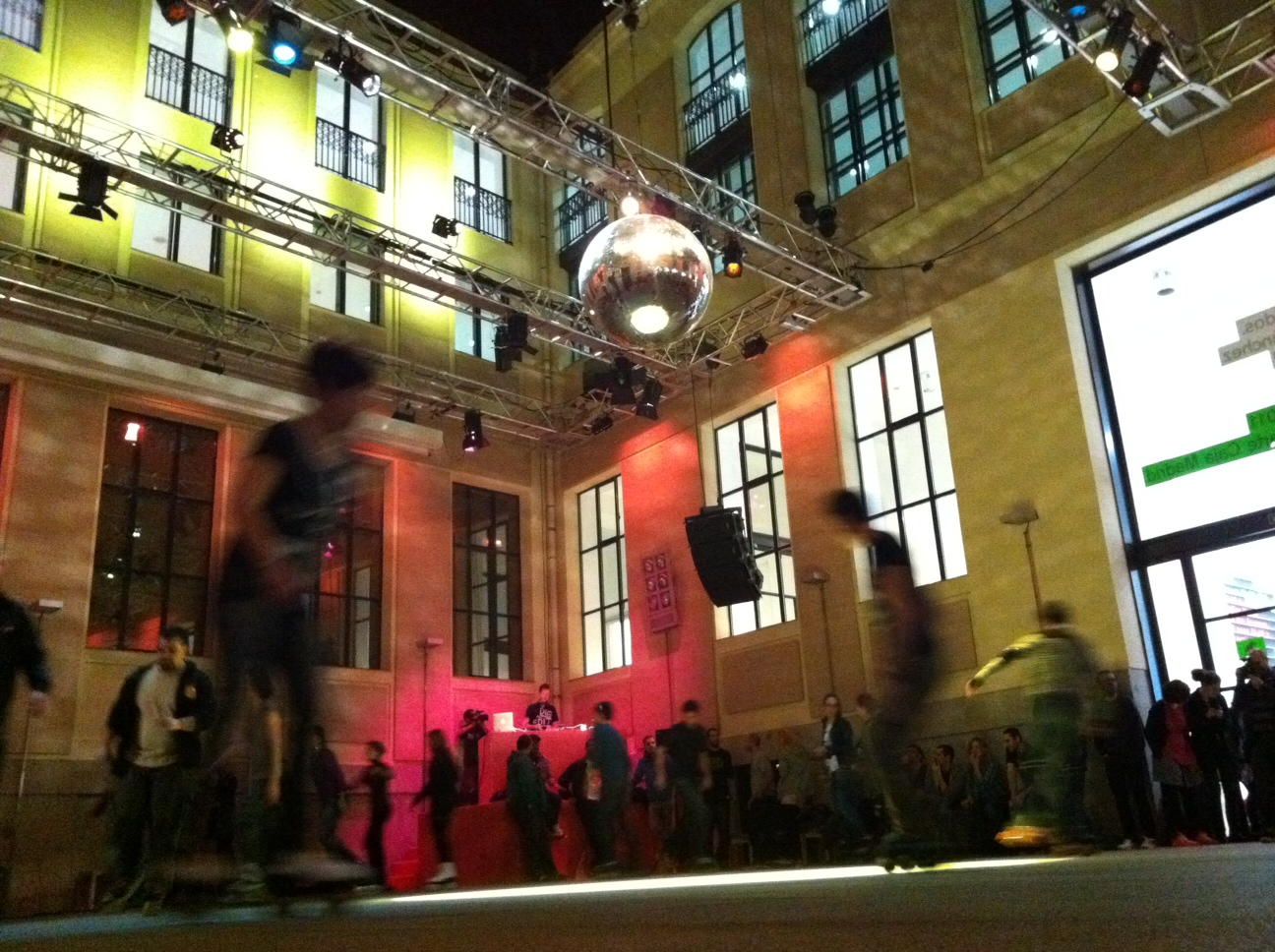
A roller disco party at Madrid, Spain's La Casa Encendida, 2011

=== 21st century ===
It experienced a mild revival in the early 2000s, especially in the mid-eastern United States, where certain clubs continue to host roller disco nights. As of 2006, the craze has largely discontinued. As of 2024, each one of the disco-era New York City roller rinks have closed. Some were eulogized in airbrushed murals at nearby Newark's Branch Brook Park Roller Rink.

Some now use in-line roller-blades. Roller discos are also popular among older children and young teenagers, especially for parties. To minimise the risk of injury, the organisers of roller discos often only allow participants to skate in one direction at a time so that they do not crash into one another, although many roller discos have a "free skate" section in the middle of the roller rink.

In 2020, roller skating and roller discos experienced a resurgence in mainstream popularity across the Western world due to the COVID-19 pandemic. The resurgence in popularity for roller skating and discos has coincided with a disco revival and a resurgence in other retro phenomena that provided "a light-hearted escape from reality" during COVID-19's widespread lockdowns, curfews and restrictions. The resurgence was powered by social media apps like Instagram, TikTok, and Snapchat which have seen an increase of roller skating-related content. During the pandemic, companies selling roller skates in the US were reported to have sold out of roller skates due to high demand. In Hobart, Australia, the popularity of roller skating in 2020 was at its highest since the 1980s.

== Gallery ==
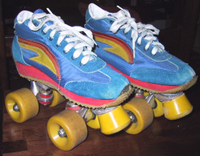
Quad roller skates, produced in an unidentified year and pictured in 2002

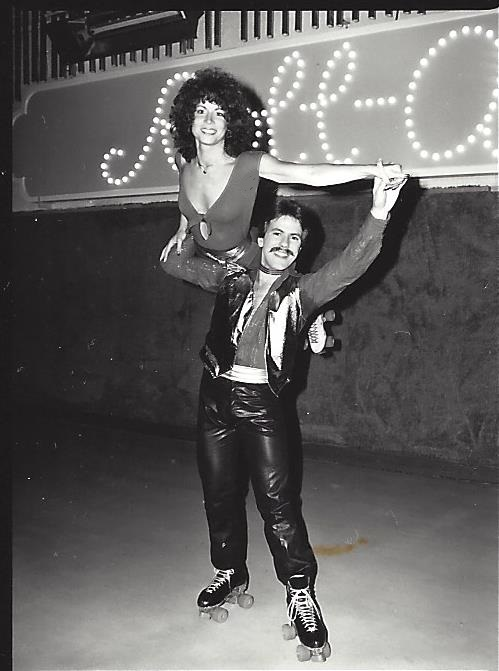
Roller skaters at Brooklyn's Sheepshead Bay Roll-A-Palace, 1979

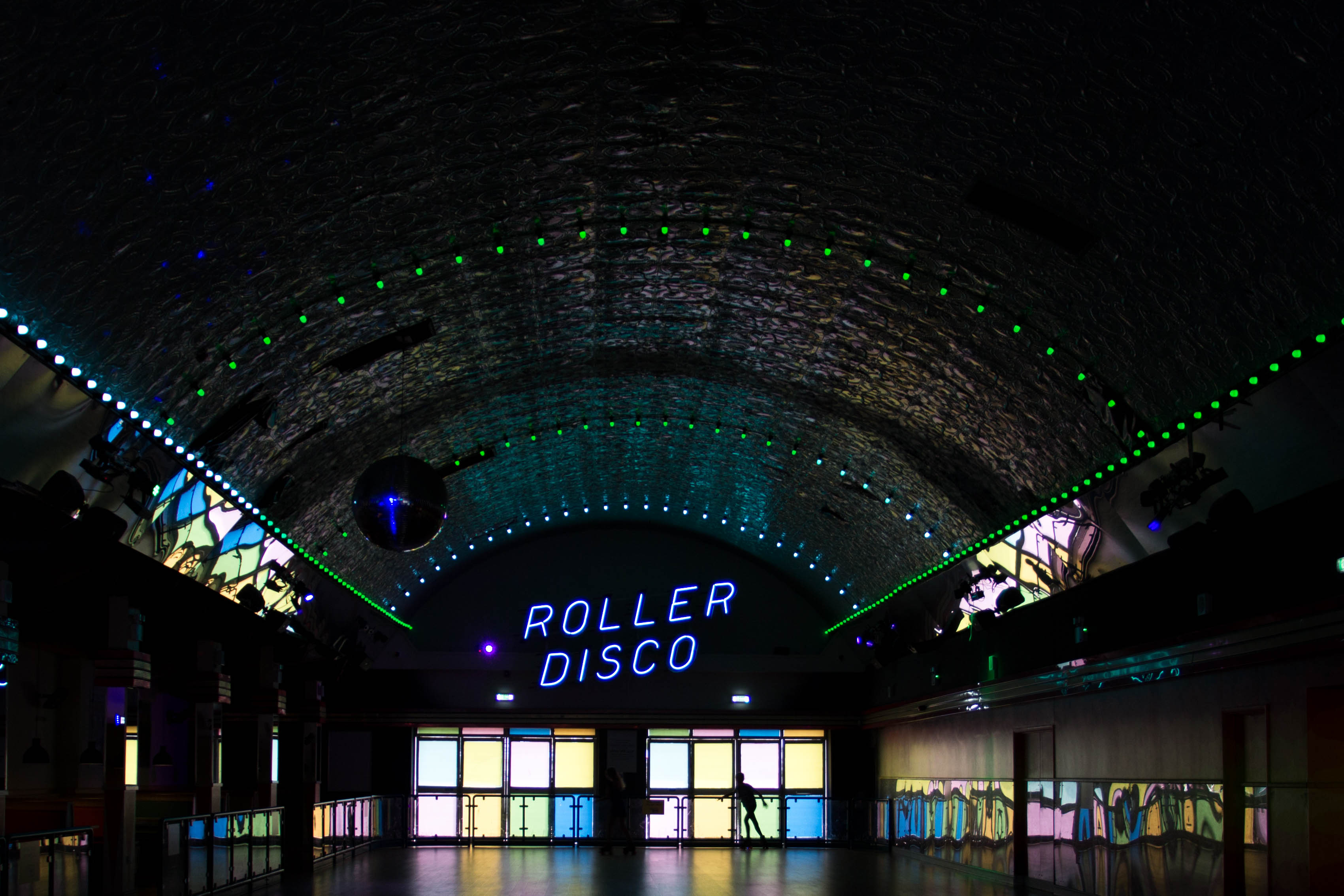
Dreamland Margate's retro-styled Roller Room, pictured in 2016

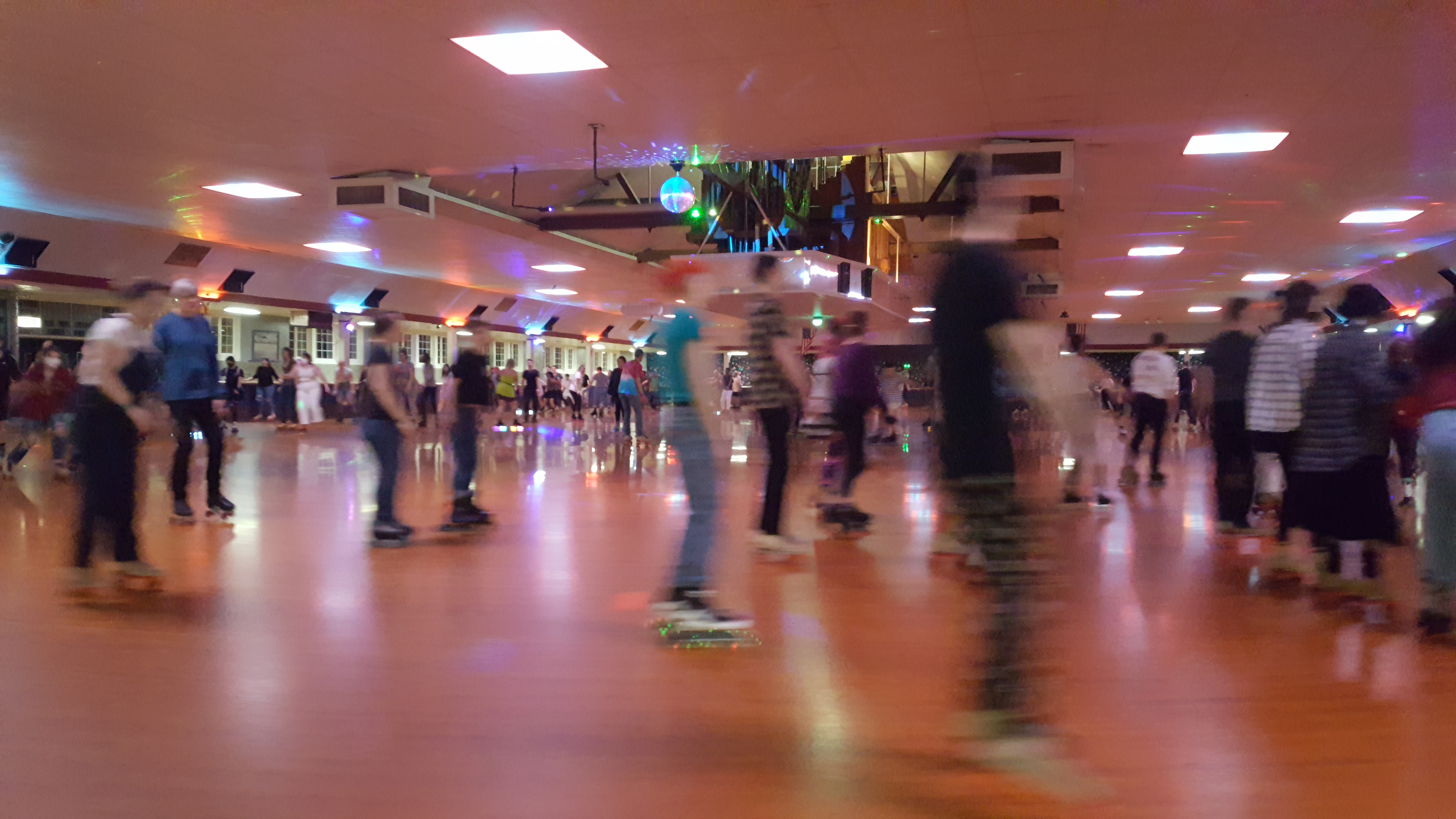
2022 "Gay Skate" event at the Oaks Park Roller Skating Rink, featuring music and a disco ball

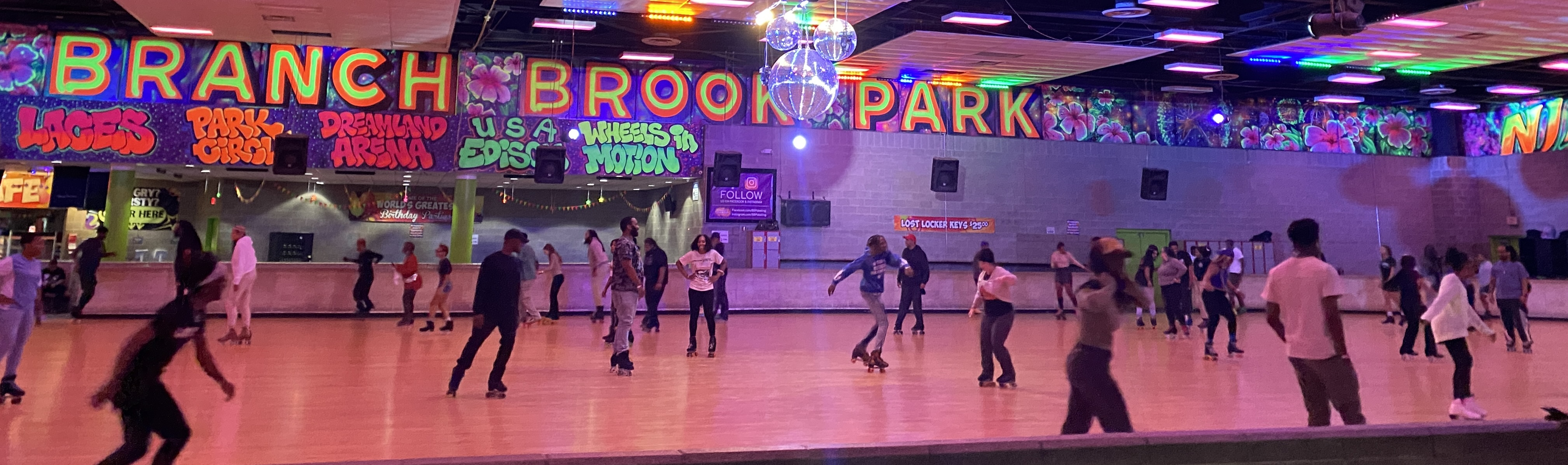
Branch Brook Park Roller Skating Center in Newark, New Jersey, featuring live DJs and a disco ball, in 2024

== See also ==
- Jam skating
