= Vaughan Mason & Crew =

American funk and post-disco musical group

- Vaughan Mason (left) & Crew

Background information
- Origin: United States
- Genres: Funk, post-disco, boogie
- Years active: 1979–1982
- Labels: Brunswick Records
- Past members: Vaughan Mason; Jerome Bell; Greg Buford; Ben Epps

Vaughan Mason & Crew was an American funk and post-disco based group led by Vaughan Mason (October 24, 1950 – April 2, 2020). They are best known for their single "Bounce, Rock, Skate, Roll", which reached number 5 on the US Billboard Hot Soul Singles and number 38 on the Disco Top 100 charts in 1980, riding the crest of the roller disco wave that was popular at the time. In 1981, Vaughan Mason released the single "Jammin' Big Guitar", which charted at number 65. "Bounce, Rock, Skate, Roll" has since been used in various samples by De La Soul, Mr. Magic, Jimmy Spicer, and Daft Punk.

Mason later recorded with Butch Dayo and Raze. Mason died of natural causes in 2020, at the age of 69.

== Discography ==
=== Studio albums ===
- Bounce, Rock, Skate, Roll (Brunswick Records, 1980)

=== Singles ===
| Year | Single | Peak chart positions | | |
| Year | Single | US Dance | US R&B | US Pop |
|---|---|---|---|---|
| 1979 | "Bounce, Rock, Skate, Roll" | 38 | 5 | 81 |
| 1980 | "Roller Skate" | — | 52 | ― |
| 1981 | "Jammin Big Guitar" | — | 65 | — |
"—" denotes releases that did not chart or were not released.
