= Illuminated dance floor =

Type of floor

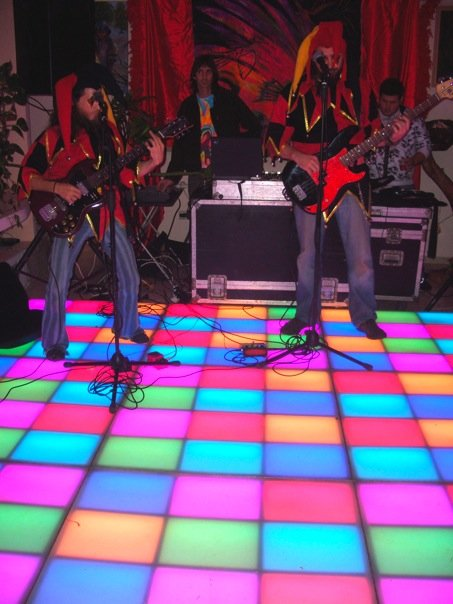
Illuminated dancefloor

An illuminated dance floor, LED dance floor or disco dance floor is a floor with panels or tiles that light up in different colours. They are used for dance. They were popularised for disco by the 1977 film Saturday Night Fever, which itself was inspired by a floor that director John Badham had seen at "The Club", a private supper club in Birmingham, Alabama.

Early illuminated floors date back to the 1920s, one of the first being built at the Via Lago Café in Chicago. They consisted of translucent coloured glass panels lit from below by bulbs.

Modern illuminated floors are lit using coloured LEDs. Usually red, green and blue LEDs are used for a range of hues. The floors are typically constructed of solid sided square cells and tiled with a toughened glass, acrylic glass or Lexan top. The sides and bottoms are made reflective and the top diffuses the light to give an even colour.

The floor can display different patterns and flash under computer control. A row or square matrix of panels share a control module. The control modules are typically connected to the computer via USB cables. USB hubs handle fan-out to a number of control modules and extend the distance that can be reached. In future, cabling and control may be simplified by connecting the control modules to each other.

The tiles may also have pressure sensors as for a dance mat so the pattern displayed or the music or other effects depend on the dancers.
