= The City Reliquary =

Local museum in Brooklyn, New York

The City Reliquary Museum & Civic Organization

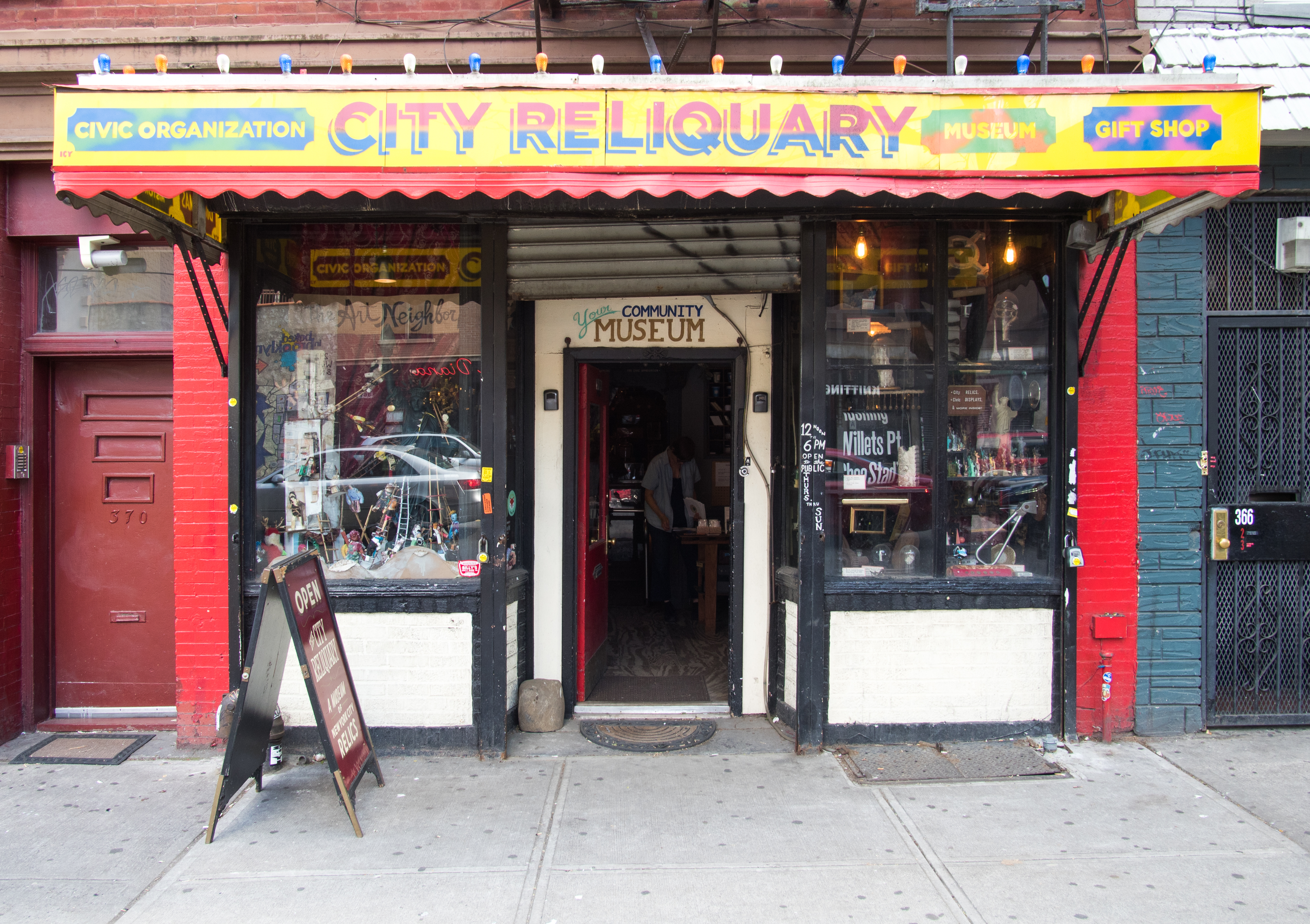
- Established: 2002; 24 years ago
- Location: 370 Metropolitan Avenue, Brooklyn, NY, 11211
- Coordinates: 40.7138751°N 73.9557643°W
- Type: Local museum
- Public transit access: Subway: G and L trains at Metropolitan Avenue/Lorimer Street; J, M, and Z trains at Marcy Avenue; Bus: Q54, Q59
- Website: www.cityreliquary.org

The City Reliquary is a not-for-profit community museum and civic organization located in the Williamsburg neighborhood of Brooklyn, New York City, US. The museum traces the history of New York City's five boroughs with its exhibitions of cultural ephemera and relics. Besides a permanent display of New York City artifacts, the City Reliquary also hosts rotating exhibits of community collections and annual cultural events.

== History ==
The beginnings of the City Reliquary date to 2002, when founder Dave Herman began displaying objects in the windows of his ground-floor Williamsburg apartment on the corner of Havemeyer and Grand Streets. Passersby were drawn to the quirky array of local artifacts, and Herman received object donations and loans from people who wanted to share their own "relics" with the greater New York community. As the collection grew, Herman moved the repository to a location on Metropolitan Avenue. The new museum opened on April 1, 2006, with a ribbon-cutting ceremony and proclamation reading by Marty Markowitz, Brooklyn Borough President from 2002 to 2013.

== Collection ==
Many items in the City Reliquary's permanent collection have some connection to historical events in New York, such as a shrine to Jackie Robinson and the Brooklyn Dodgers, memorabilia from both the 1939–40 and 1964–65 New York World's Fairs; and an interactive display relating the career of Little Egypt, a 19th-century American burlesque dancer. Dave Herman's collection of Statue of Liberty figures, which formed the original core collection, is also on view. Also on display is the rope that held the mourning drape on the New York City Hall balcony following the September 11 attacks. Other items are simply everyday objects, including a set of antique dentures washed ashore at Dead Horse Bay, a "very old shovel", and neon signs discarded by restaurants.

In addition to the permanent collection, the City Reliquary features temporary exhibitions. Film series, workshops, and curator talks complement the theme of each exhibit. Previous exhibitions have covered topics such as Jewish gangsters in New York during the first half of the twentieth century; historic shop signs from Metropolitan Avenue; and the role of New York City donut shops in popularizing the donut nationwide. The City Reliquary also displays objects loaned from members of the community in its Community Collections space. Past displays have featured unicorn figurines, argyle socks, and a "chicken museum" organized by a six-year-old boy and his father.
