= 2018 South American Games =

Multi-sport event in Cochabamba, Bolivia

XI South American Games
- Host city: Cochabamba
- Country: Bolivia
- Nations: 14 NOCs
- Athletes: 4,010
- Events: 373 in 36 sports (49 disciplines)
- Opening: 26 May
- Closing: 8 June
- Opened by: Evo Morales
- Main venue: Estadio Félix Capriles

The 2018 South American Games was a multi-sport event that took place in Cochabamba, Bolivia. It was the 11th edition of the ODESUR South American Games.

A total of 373 sporting events are scheduled to be contested across a variety of sports.

== Background ==
Bolivia, Venezuela and Peru submitted a bid to ODESUR to become host. Following a unanimous decision, the organization awarded it to the city of Cochabamba, as the other cities Lima and Puerto La Cruz withdrew their candidacies.

== Participating nations ==
14 countries competed at the games.

- Argentina (534 athletes)
- Aruba (10)
- Bolivia (617) (hosts)
- Brazil (316)
- Chile (449)
- Colombia (461)
- Ecuador (234)
- Guyana (11)
- Panama (55)
- Paraguay (252)
- Peru (447)
- Suriname (13)
- Uruguay (217)
- Venezuela (394)

== Sports ==
- Aquatics
  - Diving (7)
  - Open water swimming (2)
  - Swimming (32)
  - Synchronized swimming (2)
  - Water polo (1)
- Archery (10)
- Athletics (45)
- Badminton (6)
- Basketball
  - Basketball (2)
  - 3x3 Basketball (2)
- Basque pelota (5)
- Bowling (4)
- Boxing (13)
- Canoeing (12)
- Cycling
  - BMX racing (2)
  - Mountain biking (2)
  - Road (4)
  - Track (12)
- Equestrian (2)
- Fencing (12)
- Field hockey (2)
- Football (2)
- Futsal (2)
- Golf (3)
- Gymnastics
  - Artistic gymnastics (14)
  - Rhythmic gymnastics (8)
  - Trampoline (2)
- Handball (2)
- Judo (14)
- Karate (12)
- Modern pentathlon (3)
- Racquetball (6)
- Roller sports
  - Figure skating (2)
  - Speed skating (10)
- Rowing (14)
- Rugby sevens (2)
- Sailing (5)
- Shooting (15)
- Squash (7)
- Table tennis (7)
- Taekwondo (8)
- Tennis (5)
- Triathlon (3)
- Volleyball
  - Beach volleyball (2)
  - Volleyball (2)
- Water skiing (10)
- Weightlifting (16)
- Wrestling
  - Freestyle (12)
  - Greco-Roman (6)

== Medal table ==
* Host nation (Host nation)

Rank	Nation	Gold	Silver	Bronze	Total
1	Colombia (COL)	94	74	71	239
2	Brazil (BRA)	90	58	56	204
3	Venezuela (VEN)	43	59	55	157
4	Argentina (ARG)	42	60	63	165
5	Chile (CHI)	38	34	60	132
6	Ecuador (ECU)	25	17	52	94
7	Peru (PER)	22	29	41	92
8	Paraguay (PAR)	6	10	14	30
9	Uruguay (URU)	5	10	17	32
10	Bolivia (BOL)*	4	15	15	34
11	Panama (PAN)	2	4	4	10
12	Suriname (SUR)	2	0	1	3
13	Aruba (ARU)	0	2	1	3
14	Guyana (GUY)	0	1	4	5
Totals (14 entries)		373	373	454	1,200
