= Roller sports =

Class of sport disciplines

Roller sports are sports that use human powered vehicles which use rolling either by gravity or various pushing techniques. Typically ball bearings and polyurethane wheels are used for momentum and traction respectively, and are attached to devices or vehicles that the roller puts his weight on. The international governing body is World Skate.

== List ==
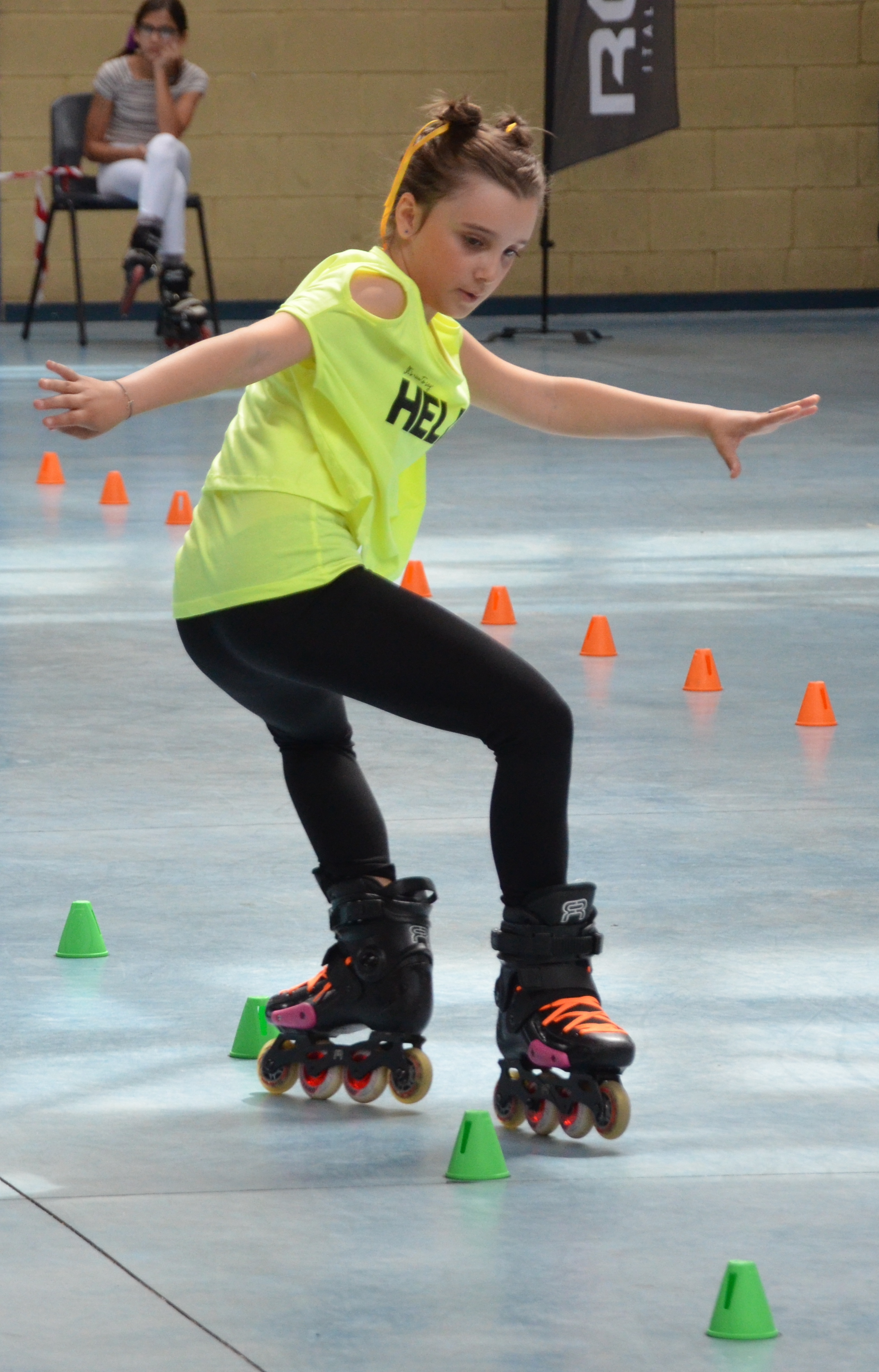
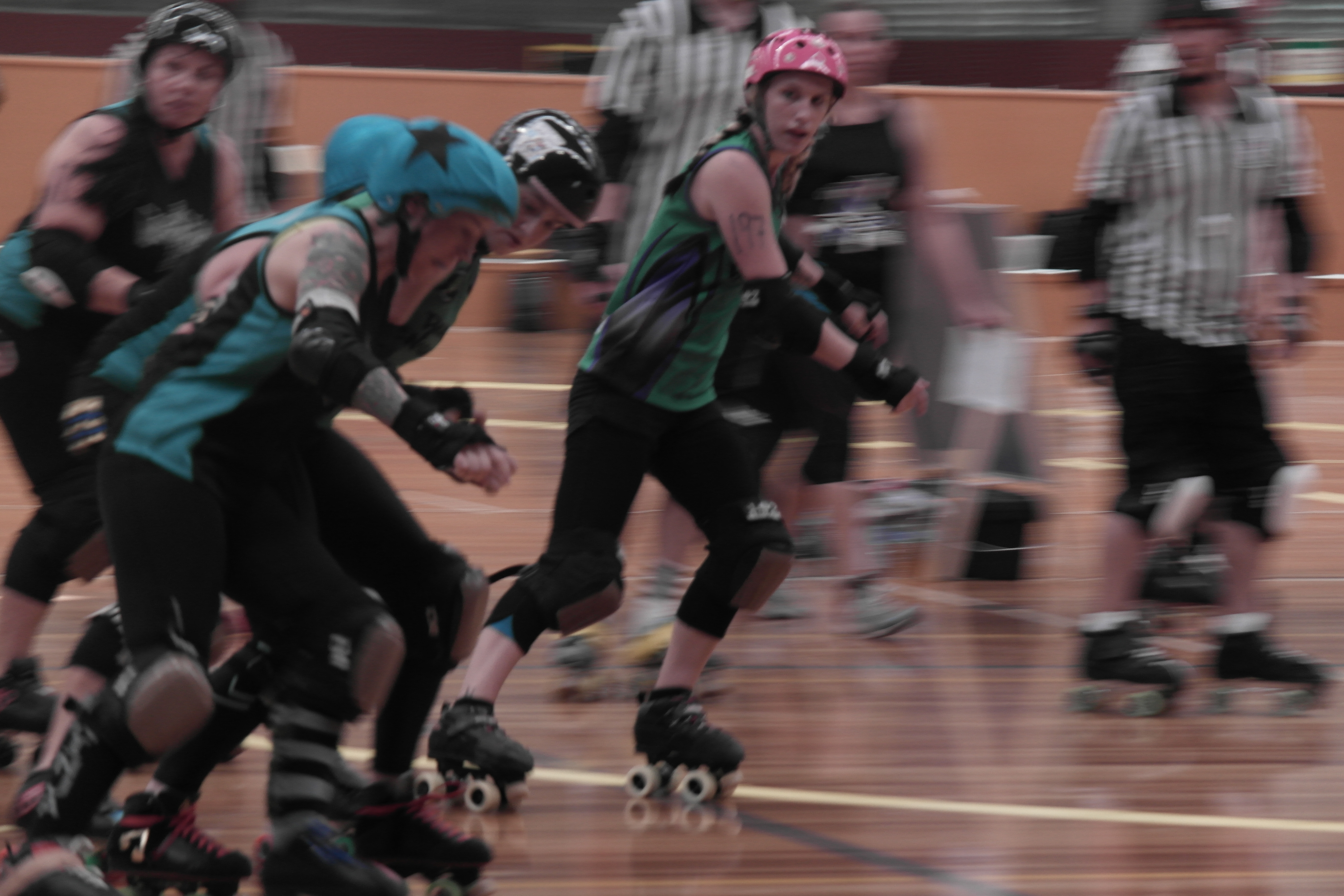
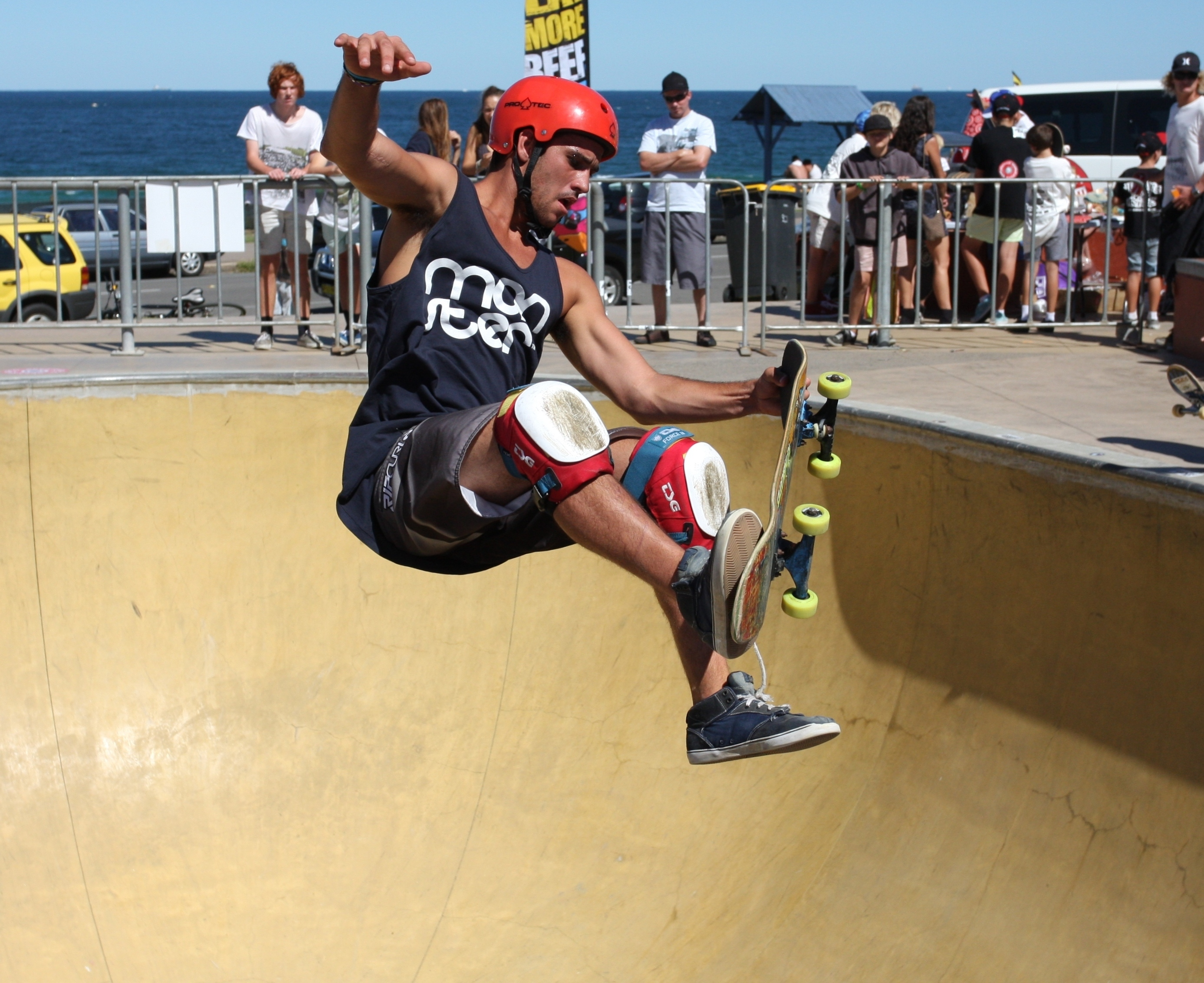
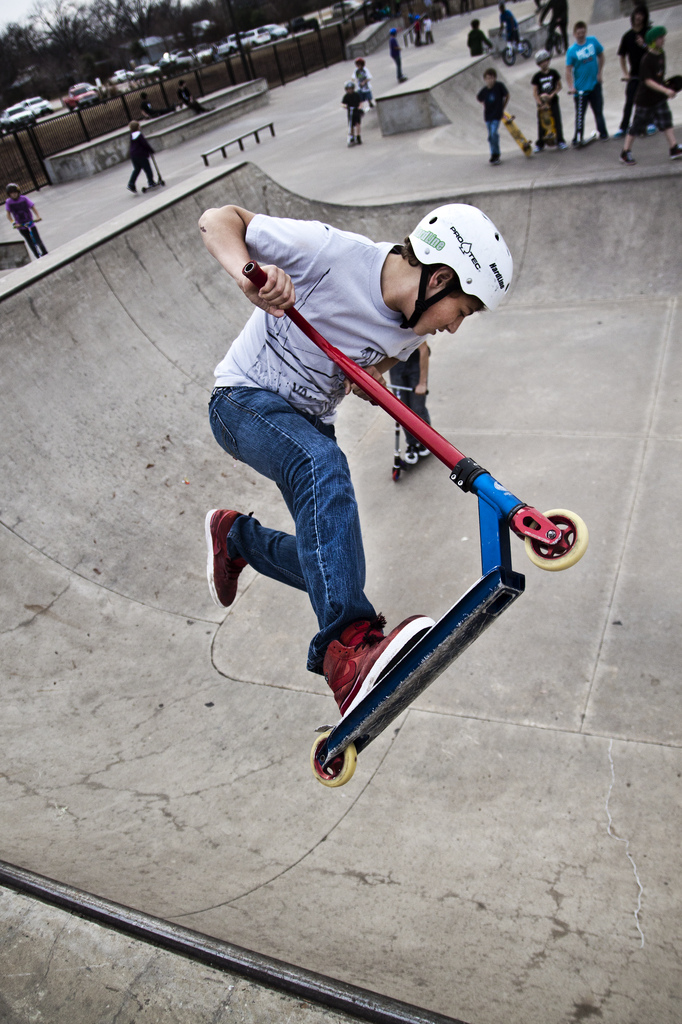
Examples of roller sports for each main devices (Inline and quad skates, skateboard and kick scooter)

Roller sports include the following disciplines:

- Roller skating
  - Inline skating
    - Vert skating
    - Aggressive inline skating
    - Freestyle slalom skating
    - Inline figure skating
    - Inline hockey
    - Inline speed skating
    - Roller soccer
    - Roll ball
    - Inline slalom/Alpine skating
  - Quad skating
    - Artistic roller skating
    - Jam skating
    - Roller derby
    - Rink hockey
  - Road skating
- Roller skiing
- Skateboarding
  - Freestyle skateboarding
  - Skateboarding trick
  - Street skateboarding
- Freestyle scootering

== World Skate Games disciplines ==
Since 2017 World Skate has organised the World Skate Games, a biennial competition that now includes 11 world championships in one single event. List of events:

- Alpine skating
- Artistic roller skating
- Downhill skateboarding
- Inline freestyle
- Inline hockey
- Rink hockey
- Roller derby
- Roller freestyle
- Skateboarding
- Inline speed skating

2024 World Skate Games had 13 sports.

== Olympic Disciplines ==
Skateboarding events have been introduced for the 2020 Summer Olympics, with two events: park and street.

== World Games Disciplines ==
On the programme for the 2022 World Games there were four roller sports disciplines: Artistic, Inline hockey, Speed Skating Road and Speed Skating track. Roller sports is the only sport on the World Games programme represented in three clusters. Speed Skating belongs to "Trend Sports", Artistic to "Artistic Sports" and Inline Hockey to "Ball Sports". For the 2025 edition Freestyle inline skating replace artistic roller skating but was considered trend sport.
