= 2024 World Skate Games =

Athletic competition

- Country: Italy
- Dates: 6–22 September
- Website: Official website

The 2024 World Skate Games were held in Rome, Novara, Pescara, and Rimini in Italy from 6 to 22 September 2024.

== Events ==
The championships contested included:

- 2024 World Skateboarding Championship
- 2024 World Scootering Championship
- 2024 Roller Freestyle Skating World Championship
- 2024 Inline Speed Skating World Championships
- 2024 Skate Cross World Championships
- 2024 Roller Hockey World Cup
- 2024 Inline Slalom World Championships
- 2024 Inline Hockey World Championships
- 2024 Inline Freestyle World Championships
- 2024 Inline Downhill World Championship
- 2024 Artistic Skating World Championships

As well as roller derby, and e-sports.

== Medal table ==
* Host nation (Italy)

Rank	Nation	Gold	Silver	Bronze	Total
1	Italy*	31	32	34	97
2	Colombia	21	13	11	45
3	Spain	19	8	22	49
4	France	11	13	15	39
5	Germany	10	14	9	33
6	United States	9	12	3	24
7	China	8	11	6	25
8	Czech Republic	8	4	1	13
9	Brazil	7	6	1	14
10	Chinese Taipei	4	7	5	16
11	Japan	3	5	5	13
12	Latvia	3	3	4	10
13	Australia	3	2	0	5
14	Portugal	2	4	1	7
15	Belgium	2	3	1	6
16	Switzerland	2	1	1	4
17	Canada	2	0	2	4
18	Iran	2	0	1	3
19	Great Britain	1	3	2	6
20	Argentina	1	2	3	6
20	Chile	1	2	3	6
22	Senegal	1	0	2	3
–	Individual Neutral Athletes	1	0	2	3
23	El Salvador	1	0	1	2
24	Slovakia	1	0	0	1
25	Netherlands	0	4	3	7
26	Poland	0	3	1	4
27	Mexico	0	1	3	4
28	Ecuador	0	1	2	3
29	Guatemala	0	1	0	1
29	Romania	0	1	0	1
29	Ukraine	0	1	0	1
32	Venezuela	0	0	3	3
33	Malaysia	0	0	2	2
34	Denmark	0	0	1	1
34	Hong Kong	0	0	1	1
34	India	0	0	1	1
34	Namibia	0	0	1	1
34	New Zealand	0	0	1	1
34	Paraguay	0	0	1	1
Totals (39 entries)		154	157	155	466
