= Compulsory dance (artistic roller skating) =

The Compulsory dance (CD) is a segment of artistic roller skating competitions in which all the couples or solo dancers perform the same standardized steps and holds to music of a specified tempo and genre. Compulsory dances were abolished for Junior/Senior level international roller skating competitions in the 2018 season, and a new section called the Style Dance was introduced from the 2015/16 season alongside the standard compulsory dances and free dance categories. The style dance is very similar in structure to the short dance in Figure skating, and from 2018 was one of 2 segments in international roller dance competition, with the free dance.

The patterns for most dances either cover one-half or one full circuit of the rink. The World Skate Artistic Technical Committee (formerly the Fédération Internationale de Roller Sports (FIRS)) publish the step diagrams and descriptions of the dances that are competed internationally, and also provide a set of standard music recordings for each dance with uniform tempo and introductory phrasing for use in competition.

== Dances ==
The dances that are performed in junior and senior international competition include:

- 14 Step Plus
- Argentine Tango
- Blues
- Castel March
- Flirtation Waltz
- Fourteen Step
- Fourteen Step Plus
- Golden Samba
- Harris Tango
- Iceland Tango
- Italian Foxtrot
- Kilian
- Midnight Blues
- Pasodoble
- Quickstep
- Rocker Foxtrot
- Shaken Samba
- Starlight Waltz
- Tango Delancha
- Tango Delanco
- Terenzi Waltz
- Westminster Waltz
- Viennese Waltz

Artistic roller skating in the United States and the United Kingdom also has competitive divisions of team and solo dance for all ages and skill levels that compete at the local, regional, and national levels. At competitions, skaters perform between two and six dances set to organ music for a maximum of 3 minutes per dance. Skaters are judged on a number of things that include technique, pattern placement, timing and overall performance.

Starting from the 2015/16 season the Style Dance was introduced and is regarded similarly to the short dance in Ice Dance. Dances marked with an asterisk* in the table below are the required dance from the style dance in the given season. From the 2017–18 season, only the Style Dance and Freedance will be skated in Junior / Senior international competition. Compulsory Dances will still be used for younger age categories internationally and also in national competitions.

=== By season ===
Season	Senior	Junior	Senior Solo	Junior Solo
2005-2006	Starlight Waltz; Iceland Tango	Blues; Harris Tango		
2006-2007	Paso Doble; Westminster Waltz	Rocker Foxtrot; Flirtation Waltz		Blues; Harris Tango
2007-2008	Viennese Waltz; Quickstep	Fourteen Step; Imperial Tango	Italian Foxtrot; Starlight Waltz	Rocker Foxtrot; Flirtation Waltz
2008-2009	Italian Foxtrot; Argentine Tango	Blues; Harris Tango	Quickstep; Westminster Waltz	14 Step Plus; Imperial Tango
2009-2010	Castel March; Starlight Waltz	Rocker Foxtrot; Flirtation Waltz	Paso Doble; Argentine Tango	Harris Tango; Blues
2010-2011	Paso Doble; Westminster Waltz	Fourteen Step; Imperial Tango	Italian Foxtrot; Iceland Tango	Flirtation Waltz; Rocker Foxtrot
2011-2012	Viennese Waltz; Tango Delanco	Blues; Harris Tango	Quickstep; Starlight Waltz	14 Step Plus; Imperial Tango
2012-2013	Starlight Waltz; Argentine Tango	Flirtation Waltz; Harris Tango	Viennese Waltz; Italian Foxtrot	Blues; Rocker Foxtrot
2013-2014	Castel March; Italian Foxtrot	14 Step; Imperial Tango	Paso Doble; Iceland Tango	Flirtation Waltz; Harris Tango
2014-2015	Iceland Tango; Quickstep	Rocker Foxtrot; Harris Tango	Westminster Waltz; Tango Delancha	14 Step Plus; Blues
2015-2016	Quickstep*; Starlight Waltz	Rocker Foxtrot*; Flirtation Waltz	Starlight Waltz*; Quickstep	Flirtation Waltz*; Rocker Foxtrot
2016-2017	Tango Delanco*; Midnight Blues	Harris Tango*; Blues	Midnight Blues*; Argentine Tango	Blues*; Terenzi Waltz
2017-2018	Midnight Blues* (Rock Medley)	Castel March* (Classic Medley)	Italian Foxtrot* (Swing Medley)	Argentine Tango (Man's Steps)* (Spanish Medley)
2018-2019	Shaken Samba* (Latin Medley)	Blues* (Rock Medley)	Tango Delancha* (Spanish Medley)	Quickstep* (Swing Medley)
