= Roller skates =

Shoe or overshoe with wheels

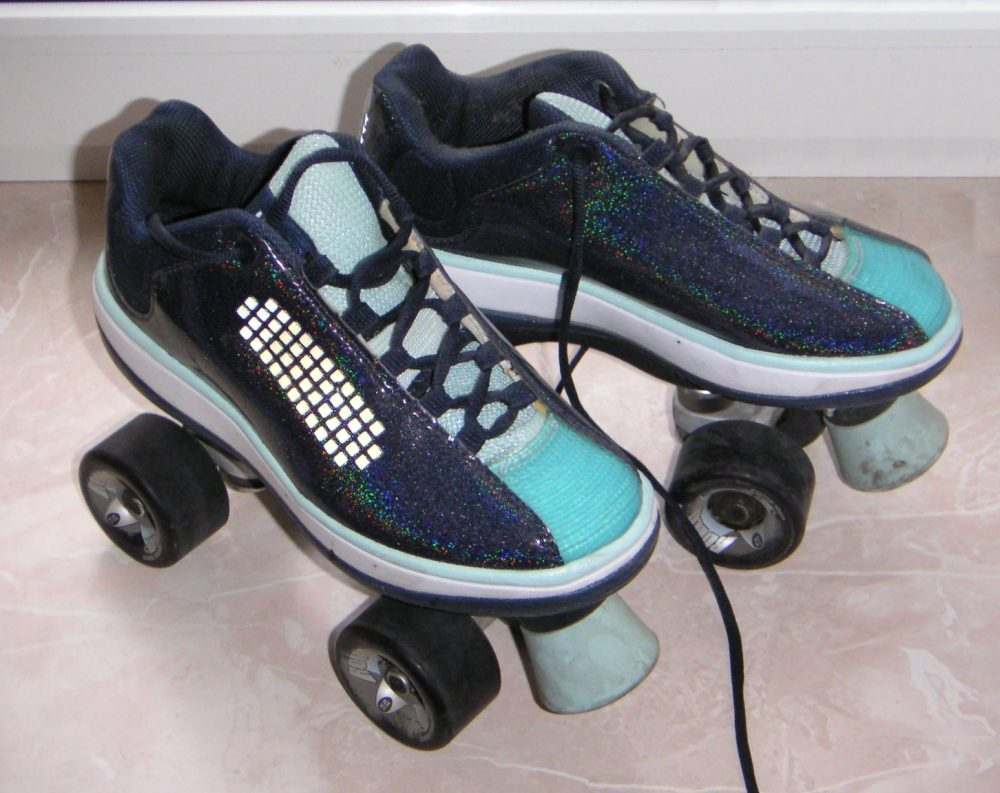
A pair of roller skates

Roller skates are boots with wheels mounted to the bottom, allowing the user to travel on hard surfaces similarly to an ice skater on ice. The first roller skate was an inline skate design, effectively an ice skate with a line of wheels replacing the blade. In modern usage, the term typically refers to skates with two pairs of wheels on shared axles like those of skateboards (early versions of which were made using roller skate parts). Skates with this configuration are also known as "quad skates" or "quads" and, like skateboards, steer by tilting the skate to one side, which causes the axles to turn inward.

Roller skating is a hobby, sport, and mode of transportation using roller skates.

== History ==
While the first reported use of wheeled skates was on a London stage in 1743, the first patented "roller skate" was introduced in 1760 by Belgian inventor John Joseph Merlin. They were hard to steer and stopping was difficult due to the fact that they did not have any type of braking mechanism and as such they failed to gain popularity. Merlin demonstrated his invention during a party in the city of Huy, during which he skated while playing the violin.

In the 1840s, Meyerbeer's opera Le prophète featured a scene in which performers used roller-skates to simulate ice-skating on a frozen lake set on stage. This exposure had an impact on audiences and led to the rise of roller skating as a new and popular activity throughout the Continent. As ice skaters subsequently developed the art of figure skating, roller skaters wanted the ability to turn in their skates in a similar fashion.

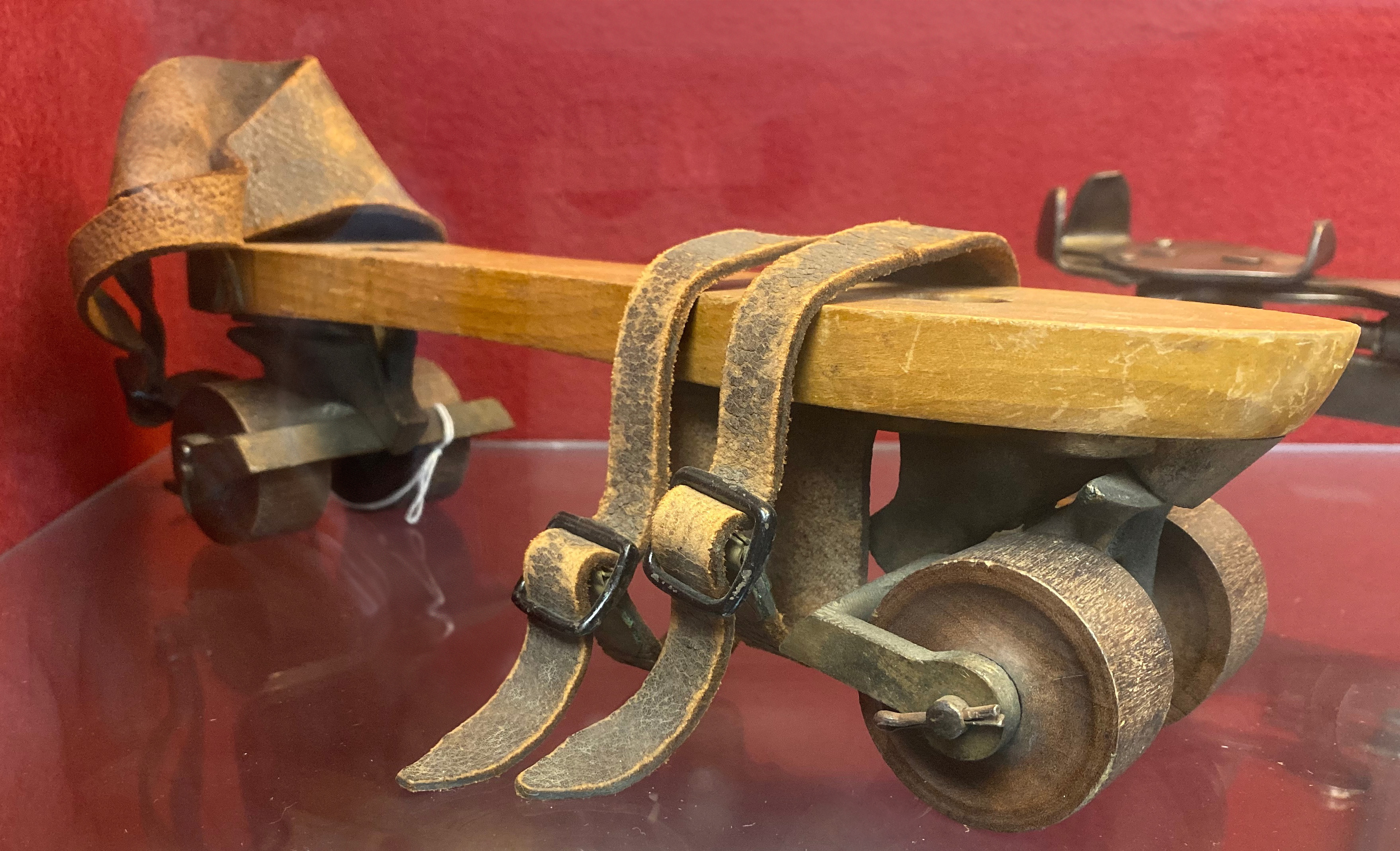
Plimpton prototype 1863-1866

In 1863, James Plimpton from Massachusetts invented the "rocking" skate and used a four-wheel configuration for stability, and independent axles that turned by pressing to one side of the skate or the other when the skater wants to create an edge. This was a vast improvement on the Merlin design, one that was easier to use and drove the huge popularity of roller skating, dubbed "rinkomania" in the 1860s and 1870s, which spread to Europe and around the world, and continued through the 1930s.

Eventually, roller skating evolved from just a pastime to a competitive sport; speed skating, racing on skates, and artistic roller skating, equivalent to figure skating on ice. In the mid-1990s roller hockey, played with a ball rather than a puck, became so popular that it even made an appearance as a demonstration sport in the Olympics in 1992. The National Sporting Goods Association statistics showed, from a 1999 study, that 2.5 million people played roller hockey. Roller skating was considered for the 2012 Summer Olympics but has never become an Olympic event. Other roller skating sports include jam skating and roller derby.

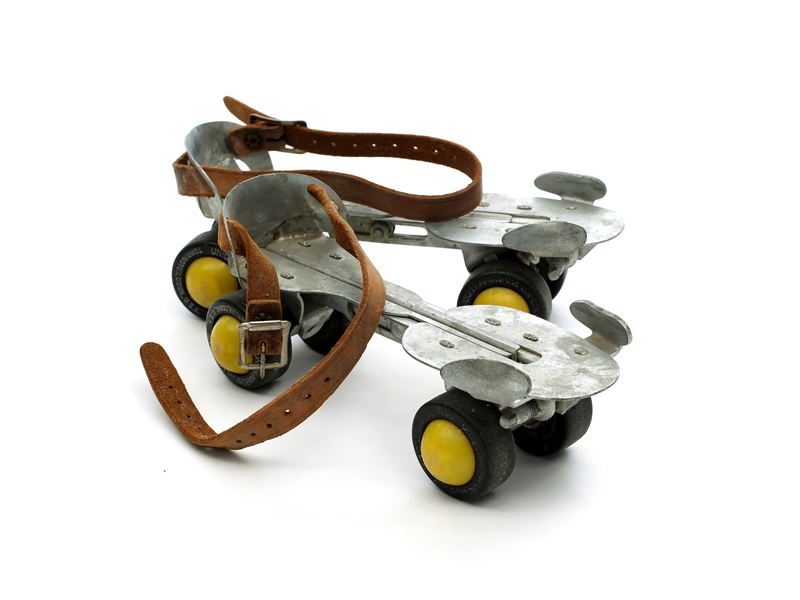
A pair of roller skates within the permanent collection of The Children's Museum of Indianapolis. Skates like these fit over shoes and were adjustable with a roller skate key.

Roller skating popularity began during the late 1950s and 1960s at rock 'n' roll teen dance halls, but exploded and took off in the 1970s and 1980s due to the introduction of large rubberized polymer wheels such as Krypto-Pro, to replace metal wheels, becoming popular and an iconic thing of that time. In the early 1990s it would begin to diminish in popularity. Sales of roller skates increased during the COVID-19 pandemic as people sought safe outdoor activities.

Roller skating saw a revival in the late 2010s and early 2020s, spurred on by a number of viral videos on the popular video-sharing app TikTok and also a revival of 1970s and 1980s pop culture from film and TV nostalgia. Many popular brands sold out to the point of back-order, with many people taking up the hobby during COVID-19 quarantines across the globe.

== Parts ==
A roller skate has two main parts: the boot and the plate, which is the part that holds the wheels and provides the ability to steer. There are two main categories of roller skate boots: a high-top boot with a raised heel similar to an ice figure skating boot, and a flat-soled boot cut at or below the ankle. The plate is bolted to the boot, typically by drilling holes through the sole of the boot to match existing holes in the plates and placing bolts with low-profile heads inside the boots with nuts on the outside facing the floor. For boots with a raised heel, screws can be driven into the heel directly. Roller skate plates are composed of several parts: the base structural component is also called the plate, and the trucks, which are the main steering components, are attached to it in a way that allows the trucks to steer when the plate is tilted. Almost all roller skate plates achieve this by sandwiching each truck between a pair of flexible cylindrical "cushions" or bushings so that it can tilt. The stack is held together by a "kingpin" that passes through the center of the stack and is used to adjust the compression applied to the cushions. The "traditional" kingpin is a bolt that threads into the plate and is secured by a jam nut against the plate. Most modern plates use a "flipped" kingpin instead, which is a threaded stud attached to the plate and allows preload adjustments using a locking nut. To prevent the truck from rotating around the kingpin, an additional protrusion from the truck called a "pivot pin" sits in a cup on the plate. Skates may also have rubber toe stops for braking or pushing off with.

== Organizations ==
The Roller Skating Rink Operators Association was developed in the U.S. in 1937. It is currently named the Roller Skating Association. The association promotes roller skating and offers classes to the public, aiming to educate the population about roller skating. Its current president is Bobby Pender and the associations headquarters are located in Indianapolis.

== Gallery ==
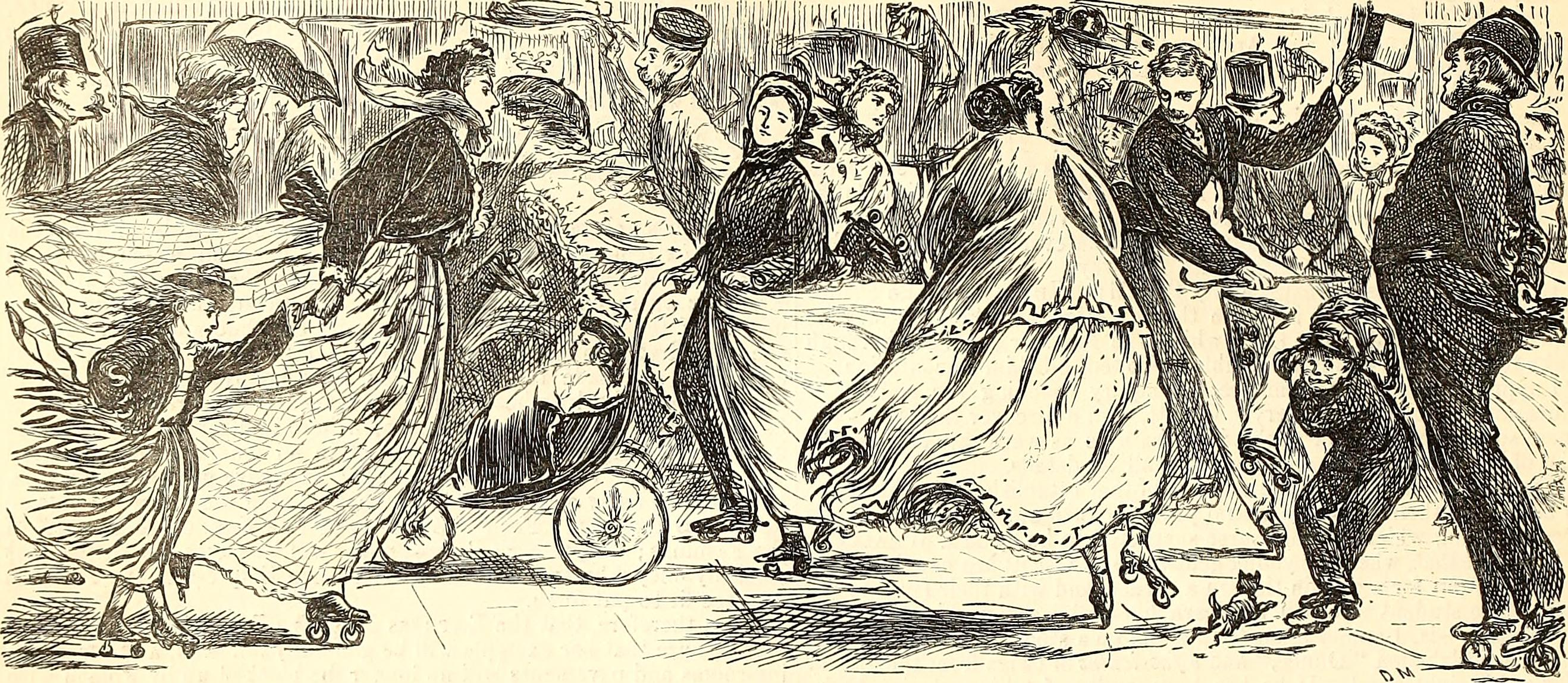
The General adoption of the rolling skate - Lively appearance of Regent street in june, a cartoon by George du Maurier published by Punch in 1866

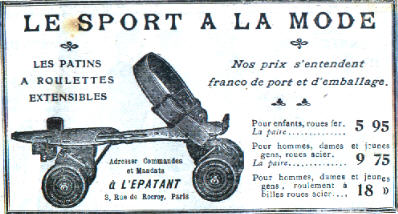
An advertisement for an early 20th-century model which fit over regular shoes

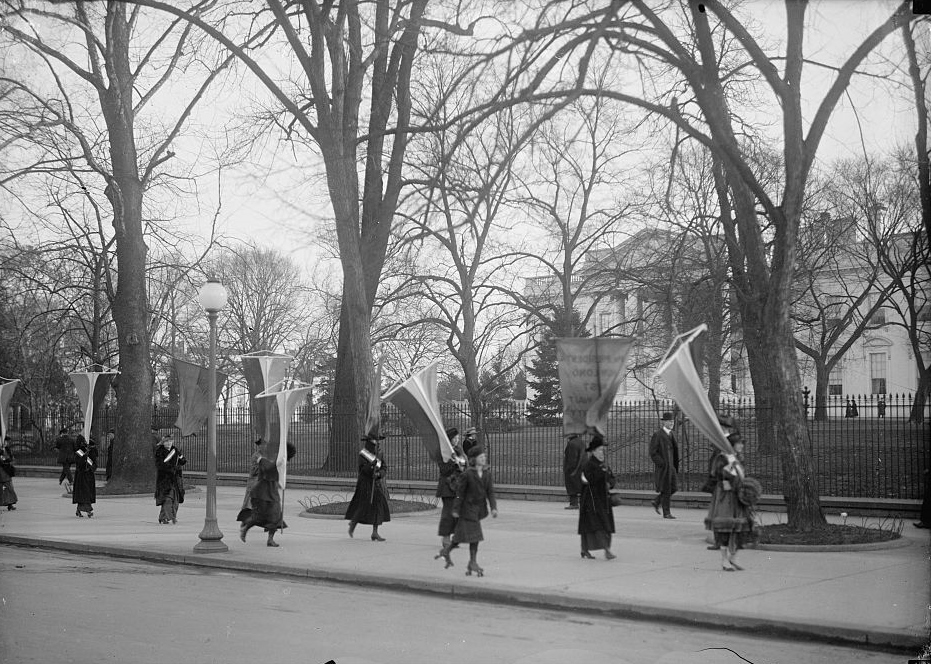
Young woman roller skating beside a group of women's suffragists at the White House, 1917

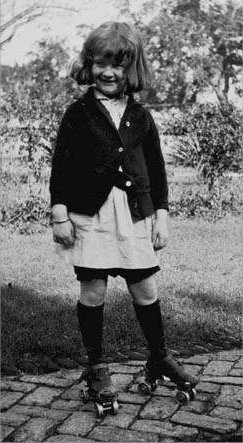
Girl on roller skates, 1921

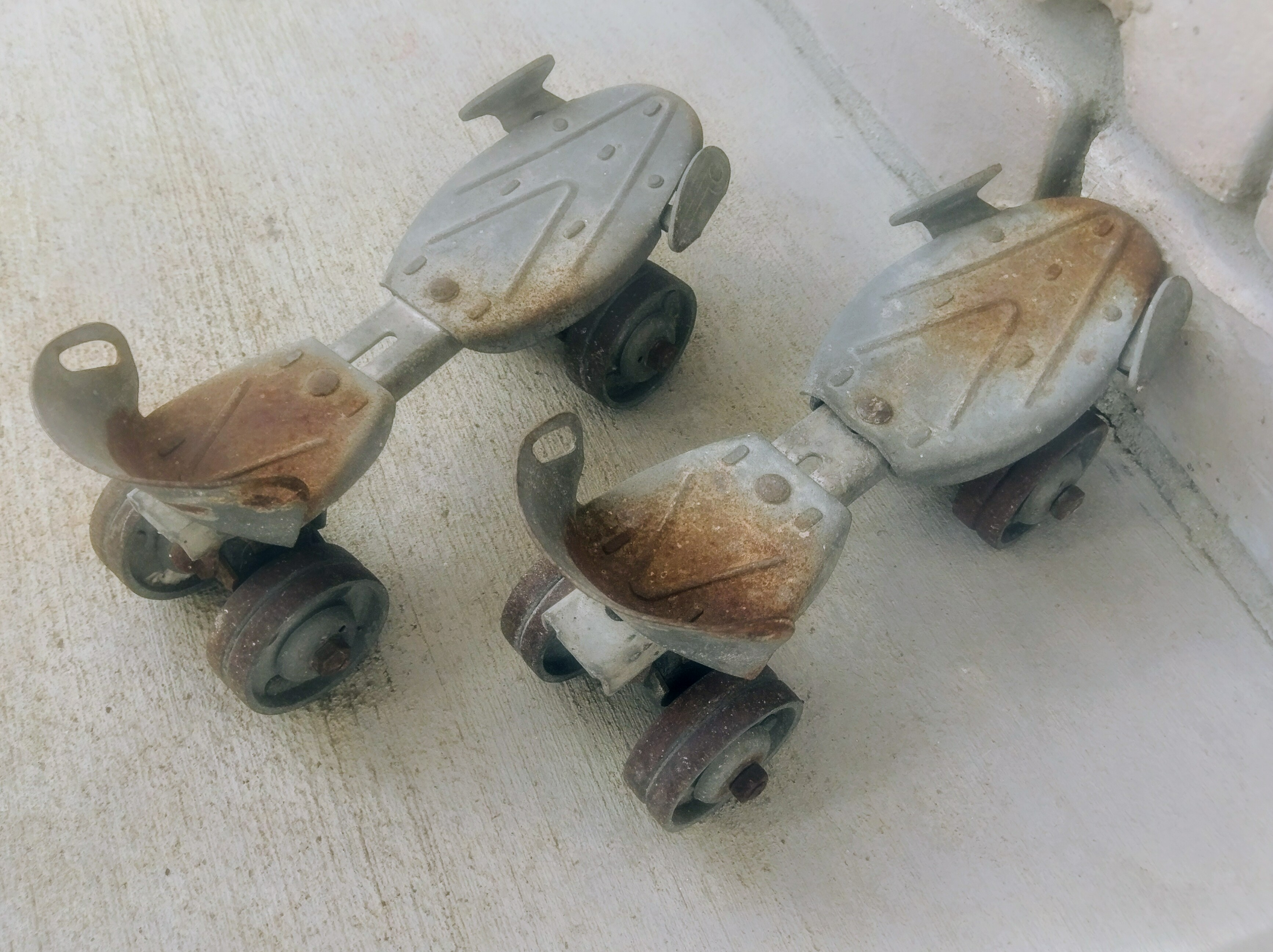
Roller skates of a design common in the 1960s

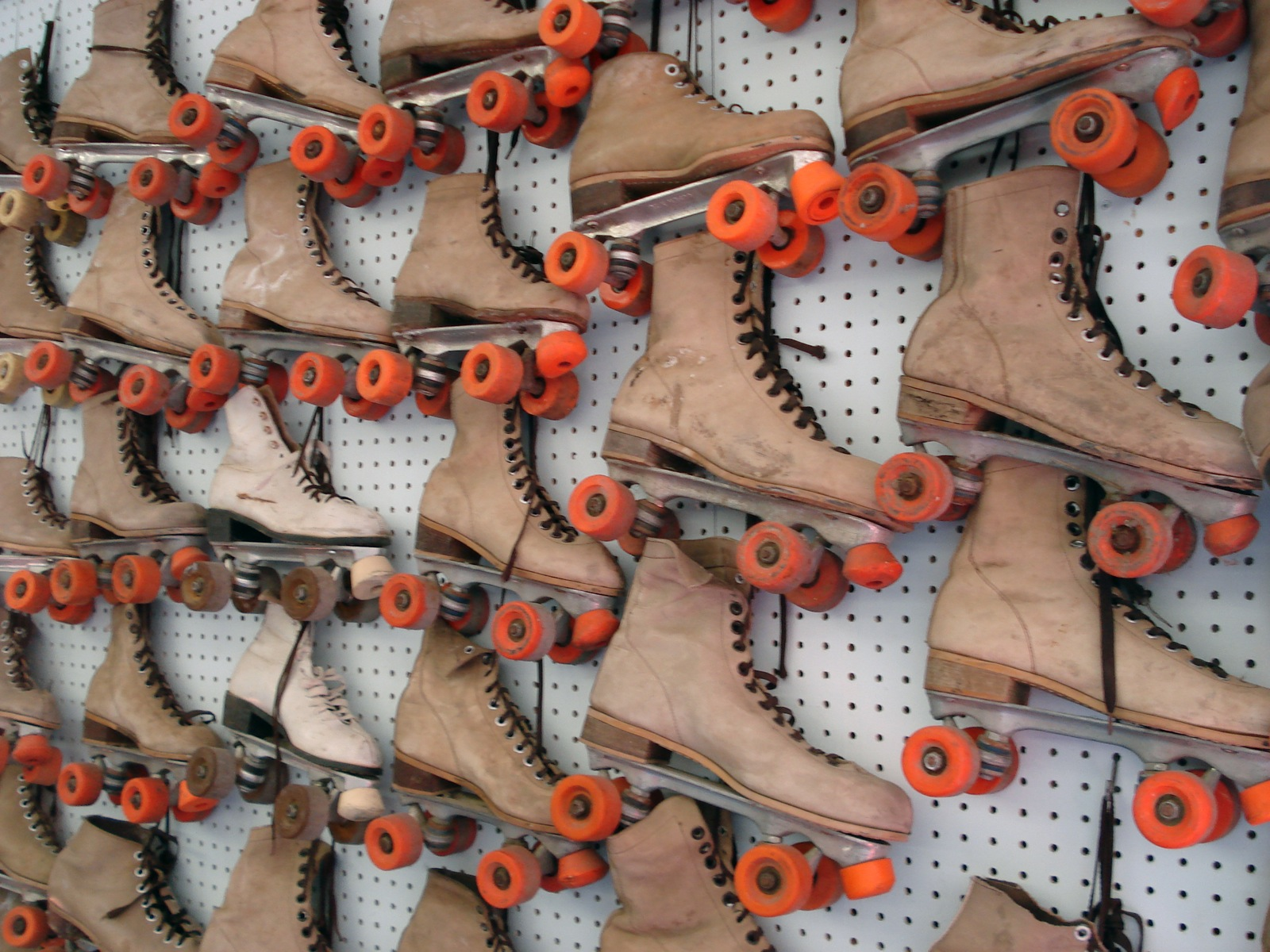
Skates at Paul Bunyan Land, Brainerd, Minnesota

== Health benefits ==
The Roller Skating Association's web page offers some health benefits of roller skating. Some of the benefits they list include:

- Providing a complete aerobic workout
- Burning 330 kilocalories (1,400 kJ) per hour while skating 10 km/h (6 mph) for a 65-kilogram (143 lb) person or 600 kilocalories (2,500 kJ) while skating 15 km/h (10 mph).
- A study from the University of Massachusetts found that in-line skating causes less than 50% of the impact shock to joints compared to running.
- Roller skating is equivalent to jogging in terms of health benefits
- The American Heart Association recommends roller skating as an aerobic fitness sport.

== See also ==
- Ice skates
- Inline skates
  - Rollerblade, a popular brand of inline skates
- Roller shoe
- Roller skating
- Roller ski
- Skike
