= Skike =

Sports device attachable to Rider's shoe

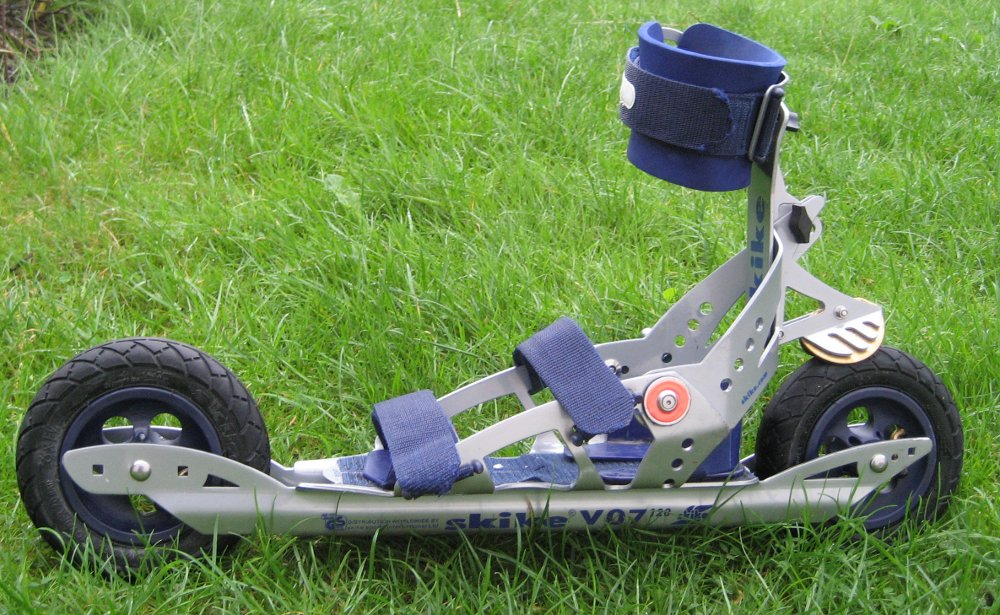
Skike V07

A skike is a sports device consisting of two wheels attached to a frame that can be strapped onto the rider's shoe. Similarly to roller skis, the skike has a wheel in front and at the tail of an aluminium frame that can be attached to the foot. However, unlike roller skis and roller skates the tires are pneumatic. In addition to asphalt, the skikes can therefore be used on rougher terrain such as dirt roads, plaster and gravel. The skike straps onto the rider's shoe, and does not require any special type of boot. It has a brake on the heel that allows the rider to stop or brake gradually by pushing back the lower legs.

The name skike is a combination of skate and bike. The skike rider moves forward in a skating motion, usually with poles, similarly to normal cross country skate skiing. Certain models such as the V9 200 series with ratcheted front wheels also allow skiing in the "classic" XC style.

The skike was invented by Otto Eder in 1997.

Supporters of the skike claim it gives great all-round exercise similar to cross-country roller skiing, but with the benefits of being able to brake easily and utilize more varied type of terrain.
