= Roller Sport South Africa =

Governing body for roller skating in South Africa

- Sport: Roller skating
- Abbreviation: RSSA
- Affiliation: International Federation of Roller Sports
- President: Wendy Gila
- Secretary: Lindri Stander

Official website
- www.rollersportsa.co.za
- (South Africa)

Roller Sport South Africa (RSSA) is the national sports governing body to promote, improve and develop the sport of roller skating (artistic and speed roller skating) in South Africa. Roller Sport South Africa is affiliated to the world governing body International Federation of Roller Sports known by its French acronym FIRS, the African Confederation of Sports of Roller Skating (ACSRS), and SASCOC. RSSA aims to become among the top 15 skating nations worldwide with a strong base of informed and competent coaches, officials and administrators.

== See also ==
- Sport in South Africa
