= Inline figure skating =

Sport discipline

- Dirk Pieter Hogerwerf - The Netherlands
- Highest governing body: Fédération Internationale de Roller Sports
- Nicknames: Inline skating

Characteristics
- Team members: Individuals, duos, or groups
- Mixed-sex: Yes
- Equipment: Inline skates

Inline figure skating is inline skating similar to figure skating on inline skates — three or four-wheel frames with a toe-stop, mounted on figure skating boots in rockered configuration.

Inline figure skating began as an off-ice training alternative for ice figure skaters. The World Skate has recognized it as artistic roller skating on inline skates and includes inline figure skating freestyle competitions at its world championships.

== Types of skaters ==
Ice / Inliners
Ice figure skaters who train off-ice on inline figure skates.
Quad / Inliners
Artistic roller skaters who also skate on inline figure skates.

== Organizations ==
- International Roller Sports Federation
- Off-Ice Skating
- World Inline Figure Skating Association World Inline Figure Skating Association - WIFSA

The World Inline Figure Skating Association was established in Paris January 30, 2011. The President is Fernand Fedronic.

The 8th inline skating Worlds was held in Cork July 5–8, 2018. Teams from France, Spain, Italy, Russia, Romania, Ukraine, United States, Ireland and others competed.

The 9th inline skating Worlds was in Fasano, Italy, July 2019.

The 10th inline skating Worlds was supposed to be held in Brwinów, Poland on July 5–8, 2020, but was postponed due to COVID pandemic for September 2021, and held in Cieszyn.

The 11th inline skating Worlds were held in Toulouse, July 2022.

The 12th inline skating Worlds were held in Paris, July 2023.

13th inline skating Worlds were held in Fasano, Italy in 2024. Antonio Panfili from Italy won in senior men category, and Patricia Elisabete Cernikova from Czechia in senior ladies.
