= Inline Alpine World Championship =

Inline alpine championship

Tournament information
- Sport: Inline Alpine
- Established: 2012
- Administrator: World Skate

The Inline Alpine World Championships is the premier inline alpine championship organised by World Skate. The competition has been recognized since 2012 and has taken place roughly biennially since. It has been included in all occurrences of the World Skate Games since its beginning in 2017. World Skate has organized this championship in partnership with the International World Inline Alpine Committee (WIAC), which started unofficial championships in 2010

== Venues ==
Year	Location	Ref.
2012	(Germany) Cham	
2014	(Germany) Kirchhundem	
2016	(Germany) Unterensingen / (Spain) Villablino	
2017	(China) Nanjing	
2018	(Japan) Saitama	
2019	(Spain) Barcelona	
2023	(Spain) Barcelona	
2024	(Italy) Chieti	
2026	(Paraguay) Asunción	

== Elite Medallists ==
=== Men ===
==== Slalom ====
Year	Winner	Runner-up	Third
2012	Kristaps Zvejnieks (LAT)	Manuel-Alessandro Zörlein (GER)	Sebastian Gruber (GER)
2014	Manuel-Alessandro Zörlein (GER)	Kristaps Zvejnieks (LAT)	Sven Ortel (GER)
2016	Kristaps Zvejnieks (LAT)	Moritz Doms (GER)	Jonas Börsig (GER)
2017	Kristaps Zvejnieks (LAT)	Marco Walz (GER)	Sven Ortel (GER)
2018	Jörg Bertsch (GER)	Sergio Méndez (ESP)	Jan Möller (CZE)
2019	Jörg Bertsch (GER)	Miks Zvejnieks (LAT)	Marco Walz (GER)
2023	Jörg Bertsch (GER)	Noah Sing (GER)	Maximilian Löw (GER)
2024	Jörg Bertsch (GER)	Maximilian Schödlbauer (GER)	Michał Styrylski (POL)
2026	Noah Sing (GER)	Sergio Menéndez (ESP)	Mattia Pe (ITA)

==== Parallel slalom ====
Year	Winner	Runner-up	Third
2012	Marco Walz (GER)	Adrian Griesser (GER)	Franz-Josef Meyer (GER)
2014	Marco Walz (GER)	Adrian Griesser (GER)	Manuel-Alessandro Zörlein (GER)
2016	Davis Zvejnieks (LAT)	Marco Walz (GER)	Moritz Doms (GER)
2019	Manuel Zoerlein (GER)	Miks Zvejnieks (LAT)	Sven Ortel (GER)
2023	Jörg Bertsch (GER)	Noah Sing (GER)	Michał Styrylski (POL)
2024	Jörg Bertsch (GER)	Michał Styrylski (POL)	Maximilian Schödlbauer (GER)

==== Giant slalom ====
Year	Winner	Runner-up	Third
2012	Philip Jung (GER)	Andreas Hilble (GER)	Georg Meeh (GER)
2014	Manuel-Alessandro Zörlein (GER)	Lukas Bleicher (GER)	Maximilian Merz (GER)
2016	Sven Ortel (GER)	Kristaps Zvejnieks (LAT)	Marco Walz (GER)
2017	Marco Walz (GER)	Marcos Morera (ESP)	Miks Zvejnieks (LAT)
2018	Jörg Bertsch (GER)	Jan Möller (CZE)	Sergio Méndez (ESP)
2019	Miks Zvejnieks (LAT)	Moritz Doms (GER)	Sven Ortel (GER)
2023	Luca Gökeler (GER)	Davis Zvejnieks (LAT)	Jan Möller (CZE)
2024	Jörg Bertsch (GER)	Marco Walz (GER)	Maximilian Schödlbauer (GER)
2026	Sergio Menéndez (ESP)	Mattia Pe (ITA)	David Fiorot (ITA)

==== Combined race ====
Year	Winner	Runner-up	Third
2017	Marco Walz (GER)	Sergio Méndez (ESP)	Miks Zvejnieks (LAT)
2018	Jörg Bertsch (GER)	Jan Möller (CZE)	Sergio Méndez (ESP)
2019	Moritz Doms (GER)	Jörg Bertsch (GER)	Sven Ortel (GER)
2023	Luca Gökeler (GER)	Jörg Bertsch (GER)	Noah Sing (GER)
2024	Jörg Bertsch (GER)	Luca Gökeler (GER)	Maximilian Schödlbauer (GER)
2026	Cristian Rondi (ITA)	Mattia Pe (ITA)	Noah Sing (GER)

=== Women ===
==== Slalom ====
Year	Winner	Runner-up	Third
2012	Ann-Kathrin Stolz (GER)	Claudia Wittmann (GER)	Ann Krystina Wanzke (GER)
2014	Ann Krystina Wanzke (GER)	Mona Sing (GER)	Jana Börsig (GER)
2016	Katharina Hoffmann (GER)	Claudia Wittmann (GER)	Lisa Wölffing (GER)
2017	Mona Sing (GER)	Claudia Wittmann (GER)	Manuela Schmohl (GER)
2018	Elea Börsig (GER)	Gabriela Kudělásková (CZE)	Barbora Procházková (CZE)
2019	Elea Börsig (GER)	Claudia Wittmann (GER)	Mona Sing (GER)
2023	Elea Börsig (GER)	Lisa Schmid (GER)	Claudia Wittmann (GER)
2024	Mona Heller (GER)	Lorenza Cesaris (ITA)	Manuela Schmohl (GER)
2026	Elea Börsig (GER)	Gabriela Möllerová (CZE)	Lenka Keselá (SVK)

==== Parallel slalom ====
Year	Winner	Runner-up	Third
2012	Ann-Kathrin Stolz (GER)	Julia Grüning (GER)	Alessandra Veit (GER)
2014	Susanne Weber (GER)	Mona Sing (GER)	Lisa Stäudinger (GER)
2016	Claudia Wittmann (GER)	Jana Börsig (GER)	Elea Börsig (GER)
2019	Manuela Schmohl (GER)	Claudia Wittmann (GER)	Ann Krystina Wanzke (GER)
2023	Elea Börsig (GER)	Mona Heller (GER)	Lisa Schmid (GER)
2024	Mona Heller (GER)	Manuela Schmohl (GER)	Elea Börsig (GER)

==== Giant slalom ====
Year	Winner	Runner-up	Third
2012	Manuela Schmohl (GER)	Ann Krystina Wanzke (GER)	Julia Grüning (GER)
2014	Ann Krystina Wanzke (GER)	Marina Seitz (GER)	Susanne Weber (GER)
2016	Mona Sing (GER)	Manuela Schmohl (GER)	Elea Börsig (GER)
2017	Mona Sing (GER)	Lara Koegel (GER)	Manuela Schmohl (GER)
2018	Elea Börsig (GER)	Barbora Procházková (CZE)	Gabriela Kudělásková (CZE)
2019	Manuela Schmohl (GER)	Ann Krystina Wanzke (GER)	Lara Koegel (GER)
2023	Manuela Schmohl (GER)	Vanessa Rogel (GER)	Elea Börsig (GER)
2024	Lorenza Cesaris (ITA)	Mona Heller (GER)	Manuela Schmohl (GER)
2026	Lorenza Cesaris (ITA)	Elea Börsig (GER)	Marta Tomšić (CRO)

==== Combined race ====
Year	Winner	Runner-up	Third
2017	Mona Sing (GER)	Lara Koegel (GER)	Lisa Schmid (GER)
2018	Elea Börsig (GER)	Barbora Procházková (CZE)	Gabriela Kudělásková (CZE)
2019	Mona Sing (GER)	Elea Börsig (GER)	Manuela Schmohl (GER)
2023	Lisa Schmid (GER)	Mona Heller (GER)	Sinah Rogel (GER)
2024	Lorenza Cesaris (ITA)	Mona Heller (GER)	Elea Börsig (GER)
2026	Lorenza Cesaris (ITA)	Elea Börsig (GER)	Lenka Keselá (SVK)

=== Mixed ===
==== Team slalom ====
Year	Winner	Runner-up	Third
2017	Germany (GER)	Czech Republic (CZE)	Spain (ESP)
2019	Germany (GER)	Spain (ESP)	Slovakia (SVK)
2023	Germany (GER)	Spain (ESP)	Italy (ITA)
2024	Germany (GER)	Italy (ITA)	Spain (ESP)
2026	Germany (GER)	Italy (ITA)	Spain (ESP)

==== Team giant slalom ====
Year	Winner	Runner-up	Third
2023	Italy (ITA)	Latvia (LAT)	Germany (GER)
2024	Italy (ITA)	Germany (GER)	Spain (ESP)
2026	Germany (GER)	Italy (ITA)	Spain (ESP)
