= World Scootering Championship =

Championship founded in 2018

Tournament information
- Sport: Roller freestyle
- Established: 2017
- Administrator: World Skate

The Scooter World Championships is the premier scootering championship organised by World Skate, the only organization that regulates scootering with the avail of the IOC. The first event took place in 2019 as part of the World Skate Games in Barcelona. This first event was organised after an agreement with the International Scooter Federation, the most popular organization that regulates scootering, to include their World Championship (which has been held annually since 2012) as part of the World Skate Games. After that, World Skate has moved on and organized their own World Championships in 2021, without the involvement of ISF. The third world championship will take place as part of the 2022 World Skate Games

== Venues ==
Year	Location
2019	(Spain) Barcelona
2021	(Spain) Barcelona
2022	(Argentina) Buenos Aires
2023	(Spain) Madrid
2024	(Italy) Ostia
2025	(Japan) Sakai
2026	(Paraguay) Asunción

== Medalists ==
=== Men ===
==== Park ====
Year	Winner	Runner-up	Third
2019	Jonmarco Gaydos (USA)	Chris Farris (USA)	Dylan Morrison (AUS)
2021	Jordan Clark (GBR)	Cody Flom (USA)	Jayden Sharman (GBR)
2022	Jamie Hull (GBR)	Bartosz Oskroba (POL)	Chris Farris (USA)
2023	Jordan Clark (GBR)	Jayden Sharman (GBR)	Matěj Pekárek (CZE)
2024	Jayden Sharman (GBR)	Jordan Clark (GBR)	Calum Connor (GBR)
2025	Jayden Sharman (GBR)	Jordan Clark (GBR)	Timon Pharabod (FRA)
2026	Jayden Sharman (GBR)	Matěj Pekárek (CZE)	Harvey Perkins (GBR)

==== Street ====
Year	Winner	Runner-up	Third
2021	Lucas Di Meglio (FRA)	Niko Kylmälä (FIN)	Auguste Pellaud (FRA)
2022	Jonathan Perroni (FRA)	Richard Zelinka (CZE)	Lucas Di Meglio (FRA)
2023	Lucas Di Meglio (FRA)	Guifré Obradors (ESP)	Matěj Pekárek (CZE)
2024	Lucas Di Meglio (FRA)	Eden Gagliano (GBR)	Alexandre Bailly (FRA)
2025	Kai Martin (USA)	Lucas Di Meglio (FRA)	Jack Walsh (USA)
2026	Jack Walsh (USA)	Léonard Bometon (FRA)	Lucas Di Meglio (FRA)

=== Women ===
==== Park ====
Year	Winner	Runner-up	Third
2019	Beca Ortiz (USA)	Alexandra Madsen (NZL)	Bianca Dilworth (AUS)
2021	Lucy Evans (GBR)	Claire Parks (USA)	Beca Ortiz (USA)
2022	Beca Ortiz (USA)	Claire Parks (USA)	Lucy Evans (GBR)
2023	Claire Parks (USA)	Alexandra Madsen (NZL)	Mia Catalano (USA)
2024	Claire Parks (USA)	Neve Entwistle (GBR)	Maja Dudek (POL)
2025	Neve Entwistle (GBR)	Claire Parks (USA)	Alexandra Madsen (NZL)
2026	Chanel Martin (USA)	Beca Ortiz (USA)	Neve Entwistle (GBR)

==== Street ====
Year	Winner	Runner-up	Third
2023	Mia Catalano (USA)	Joséphine Zgorski (FRA)	Sophie Molyneux (GBR)
2024	Mia Catalano (USA)	Romane Gilliet (FRA)	Sophie Molyneux (GBR)
2025	Joséphine Zgorski (FRA)	Romane Gilliet (FRA)	Mia Catalano (USA)
2026	Romane Gilliet (FRA)	Joséphine Zgorski (FRA)	Sophie Molyneux (GBR)
