= World Skate =

Roller sports governing body

- Abbreviation: WS
- Predecessor: Federation Internationale de Roller Sports
- Founded: 21 April 1924; 102 years ago
- Type: Sports federation
- Legal status: Governing body of Roller sports
- Headquarters: Lausanne, Switzerland
- Region served: Worldwide
- Members: 130
- Official languages: English, French, Spanish
- President: Sabatino Aracu
- Vice-Presidents: First Vice President Karen Doyle; Nathanael Koty; Alberto Herrera Ayala; (Thomas) Cai Yongjung; Luís Sénica
- Secretary: Roberto Marotta
- Affiliations: ARISF
- Website: worldskate.org

World Skate is the international governing body for roller sports and related disciplines. The organisation is the successor of the Fédération Internationale de Roller Sports (FIRS) founded on 21 April 1924.

== Disciplines ==
World Skate serves as the international governing body for:

- Artistic skating
- Inline alpine skating
- Inline downhill skating
- Inline freestyle skating
- Inline speed skating
- Roller derby
- Roller freestyle skating, also called aggressive inline skating or rollerblading
- Roller hockey
  - Inline hockey, also called roller in-line hockey
  - Rink hockey or quad hockey
- Scootering, also called freestyle scootering
- Skateboarding
- Skate cross

== History ==
World Skate was established as the Fédération Internationale de Patinage a Roulettes (FIPR) on 21 April 1924 as an organ for creating multinational European championship tournaments for roller sports. The founding meeting was organized by Fred Renkewitz and Otto Myer and included representatives from France, Germany, Great Britain, and Switzerland. Renkewitz served as president of the FIPR from its founding in 1924 until 1960.

The FIPR began organizing World Championship events in the later 1930s, with the first Rink Hockey World Championship hosted in Stuttgart in 1936. The inaugural Speed Skating World Championship was held in 1937–38, with events in Monza, Italy; London, United Kingdom; and Ferrara, Italy. After a pause to all sport competition during World War II, the World Championships resumed in 1947 and the first Artistic Skating World Championship was held in Washington, D.C., United States.

During the 1960s, the organization was recognized by the International Olympic Committee and the governing body for all roller skating sports and renamed as the Fédération Internationale de Roller Skating (FIRS). It gained member status in the General Association of International Sports Federations (GAISF) in the 1970s.

Artistic skating, rink hockey, and speed skating remained the principal sports regulated by FIRS until inline hockey was included in the 1990s, with the first Inline Hockey World Championship held in 1995. At the FIRS Congress in 2000, a vote approved the modification of the name from Fédération Internationale de Roller Skating to Fédération Internationale de Roller Sports; the FIRS acronym remained unchanged.

In November 2004, the FIRS became subject of political controversy, known as the Fresno Case, when it revoked the provisional membership status of Catalonia. Spanish officials were reported as having brought pressure to bear on a number of countries to vote against Catalan membership. While it was a recognized member, Catalonia's national team won the 2004 Rink Hockey Men's B World Championship.

The FIRS continued to expand the scope of its governance to additional roller sport disciplines and, by 2017, it served as the governing body of ten sports. The inaugural World Roller Games in 2017 served as the world championship for all ten of the FIRS' governed sports, merging the various world championship tournaments into a two week skating event hosted in Nanjing, China. The second World Roller Games were held in 2019 in Barcelona, Spain.

The FIRS merged with the International Skateboarding Federation (ISF) in June 2017 and was rebranded as World Skate following approval by the FIRS Congress in September. Along with the rebrand, the World Roller Games were renamed the World Skate Games. The 2022 World Skate Games in Argentina was the first edition to utilize the new name.

Due to the 2022 Russian invasion of Ukraine, World Skate banned Russian and Belarusian athletes and officials from its competitions, and does not stage any events in Russia or Belarus.

== Competitions ==
=== World Skate Games ===
Since 2017, World Skate has organized the bi-annual World Skate Games, comprising all roller sport disciplines governed by World Skate. The World Skate Games are a multi-sport event that serves as the World Championship of 11 disciplines: alpine, artistic, inline downhill, inline freestyle, inline hockey, rink hockey, roller derby, roller freestyle, scooter, skateboard, and speed.

The first edition of the event was hosted in Nanjing, China during September 2017 as the 'World Roller Games.' Over 3,000 athletes, 193 national teams, and 61 national federations participated in the fifteen-day festival, which named world champions in ten sports.

The second edition of the World Roller Games attracted more than 4,000 athletes to Barcelona, Spain during July 2019. Seventy-six national federations participated in eleven sports.

The third edition of the event – the first to be contested under the rebranded 'World Skate Games' moniker – was originally scheduled to take place in during October and November 2021 in the host cities of Vicente López, Buenos Aires and San Juan, Argentina. It was later announced that the Games would be postponed until 2022 due to scheduling conflicts caused by the COVID-19 pandemic but were expected to be hosted in Argentina as originally planned.

=== Olympic Games ===
In 1992, roller hockey was played at the 1992 Summer Olympics as a demonstration sport.

Skateboarding events were introduced beginning at the 2020 Summer Olympics with two events: park and street. Much like BMX cycling, the park event features what resembles an empty swimming pool. Competitors have three timed runs for tricks. On street, there are ramps and rails for routines and tricks. At the 2020 Olympics, a total of 80 spots were available, with a maximum of 20 competitors per event. Each country could enter up to three athletes in each event.

==== Youth Olympic Games ====
Roller sport made its debut at the Youth Olympic Games in 2018, in which two speed skating events were added as medal sports.

=== World Games ===
World Skate has been represented at the World Games since the first games, held in 1981. Both artistic skating and inline speed skating track have been featured at every holding of the Games, and either roller hockey or inline hockey has been featured at all but the 1997 World Games.

The International World Games Association (IWGA) announced on 16 April 2018 that four roller sports would be included in the 30 official sports competing for gold at the 2021 World Games, during 15–25 June in Birmingham, Alabama. Birmingham marks the 40th anniversary of the event which will feature 3,600 athletes from more than 100 countries. This the first time the World Games has returned to the United States since 1981.

On the programme for the 2021 World Games are four roller sports disciplines; artistic skating, inline hockey, and two speed skating types, road and track. World Skate is the only sport-type on the World Games programme to be represented in three separate clusters, with speed skating categorized with "Trend Sports," artistic skating with "Artistic Sports," and inline hockey with "Ball Sports."

=== World Championships ===
- Artistic Skating World Championships
- Inline Alpine World Championship
- Inline Downhill World Championship
- Inline Hockey World Championship
- Inline Speed Skating World Championship
- Roller Derby World Championship
- Roller Freestyle Skating World Championship
- Roller Hockey World Cup
- World Scootering Championship
- World Skateboarding Championship

=== Regional events ===
==== Single-sport events ====
- Asian Inline Speed Skating Championship, since 1985
- African Inline Speed Skating Championship, since 2017
- European Inline Speed Skating Championship, since 1989
- Ocean Inline Speed Skating Championship
- Pan American Skating Championships

==== Multi-sport events ====
- Asian Games
- Pan American Games

In May 2019, Panam Sports announced that skateboarding had been removed from the roller sports program for the 2019 Pan American Games in Lima because World Skate could not guarantee that the best possible athletes would be in attendance. World Skate had scheduled a World Tour event with dates that overlapped with the Pan American Games. Tensions between the organizations were already high, as World Skate had refused to authorize the competition as an Olympic qualifier.

== Continental Areas ==
World Skate comprises five continental areas, each involved in organising their own regional competitions:

- World Skate Africa
- World Skate America (CSP Confederacion Sudamericana de Patinaje)
- World Skate Asia
- World Skate Europe
- World Skate Oceania

== See also ==
- Fédération Internationale de Roller Sports
