= Roller Freestyle Skating World Championship =

Championship founded in 2018

Tournament information
- Sport: Roller freestyle
- Established: 2017
- Administrator: World Skate

The Roller Freestyle World Championships is the premier roller freestyle championship organised by World Skate. The competition has been held annually biennially since 2017 as part of the World Skate Games.

== Venues ==
Year	Location
2017	(China) Nanjing
2019	(Spain) Barcelona
2022	(Argentina) Buenos Aires
2024	(Italy) Rome
2025	(Japan) Sakai
2026	(Paraguay) Asunción

== Elite Medallists ==
=== Men's ===
==== Park ====
Year	Winner	Runner-up	Third
2017	Roman Abrate (FRA)	Jeremy Melique (FRA)	Julien Cudot (FRA)
2019	Joe Atkinson (GBR)	Nicolas Servy (FRA)	Jeremy Melique (FRA)
2022	Julien Cudot (FRA)	Danilo Senna (BRA)	Diako Diaby (FRA)
2024	Julien Cudot (FRA)	Léo Fumery (FRA)	Jaro Frijn (NED)
2025	Danilo Senna (BRA)	Jaro Frijn (NED)	Léo Fumery (FRA)
2026	Lenny Jourda (FRA)	Léo Fumery (FRA)	Julien Cudot (FRA)

==== Street ====
Year	Winner	Runner-up	Third
2022	Diego Guilloud (SUI)	Noboru Katayama (JPN)	Joe Atkinson (GBR)
2024	Julien Cudot (FRA)	Danilo Senna (BRA)	Nils Jansons (LAT)
2025	Julien Cudot (FRA)	Léo Fumery (FRA)	Yoon Jong-hyun (KOR)
2026	Leonardo Cardoso (BRA)	Danilo Senna (BRA)	Nils Jansons (LAT)

==== Vert ====
Year	Winner	Runner-up	Third
2022	Takeshi Yasutoko (JPN)	Yoshiki Takashima (JPN)	Haruhi Shimizu (JPN)
2024	Takeshi Yasutoko (JPN)	Haruhi Shimizu (JPN)	Abel Morales (ESP)
2026	Men's event cancelled due to poor weather conditions		

=== Women ===
==== Park ====
Year	Winner	Runner-up	Third
2017	Chihiro Azuma (JPN)	Amandine Crondoyer (FRA)	María Muñoz (ESP)
2019	Chihiro Azuma (JPN)	Misaki Katayama (JPN)	Manon Derrien (FRA)
2022	Chihiro Azuma (JPN)	Yoshiki Takashima (JPN)	María Muñoz (ESP)
2024	Nicoly Joao (BRA)	Ana Júlia da Silva (BRA)	Mei Myoga (JPN)
2025	Ana Júlia da Silva (BRA)	Mei Myoga (JPN)	Han Qimuge (CHN)
2026	Ana Júlia da Silva (BRA)	Carla Martín (ESP)	Mei Myoga (JPN)

==== Street ====
Year	Winner	Runner-up	Third
2022	María Muñoz (ESP)	Carla Pasquinelli (FRA)	Mei Myoga (JPN)
2024	Ana Júlia da Silva (BRA)	Nicoly Machado (BRA)	Misaki Katayama (JPN)
2025	Mei Myoga (JPN)	Shiono Hashimoto (JPN)	Ana Júlia da Silva (BRA)
2026	Carla Pasquinelli (FRA)	Nicoly Machado (BRA)	Laura Brito (BRA)

==== Vert ====
Year	Winner	Runner-up	Third
2022	Carla Martín (ESP)	Sorachi Kawasaki (JPN)	Eneritz Quincoces (ESP)
2024	Kaho Miyao (JPN)	Sorachi Kawasaki (JPN)	Carla Martín (ESP)
2026	Sorachi Kawasaki (JPN)	Ayumi Kayaki (JPN)	Ana Júlia da Silva (BRA)
