= Inline Downhill World Championship =

Annual competition

Tournament information
- Sport: Inline Downhill
- Established: 2000
- Administrator: World Skate

The Inline Downhill World Championships is the premier inline downhill championship organised by World Skate. The competition has been held annually since 2000 and has been part of World Skate's World Skate Games since 2017. World Skate has organized this championship in partnership with the International Inline Downhill Association (IIDA)

== Venues ==
Year	Location
2000	(Austria) Zell am See
2001	(Switzerland) Lausanne
2002	Italy
2003	(Austria) Übersaxen
2004	(Germany) Borgholzhausen
2005	(France) Lyon
2006	(Italy) Teolo/Padua
2007	(Germany) Albstadt
2008	(Austria) Übersaxen
2009	(Italy) Teolo
2010	(Italy) Teolo
2011	(Italy) Bettola
2012	(Austria) Schönberg am Kamp
2013	(France) Lyon
2014	(Switzerland) Lausanne
2015	(Italy) Cisterna d'Asti
2017	(China) Nanjing
2018	(Italy) Teolo
2019	(Spain) Barcelona
2021	(Italy) Bettola
2022	(Argentina) San Juan
2024	(Italy) Tortoreto
2026	(Paraguay) Asunción

== Elite Medallists ==
=== Men ===
==== Downhill race ====
Year	Winner	Runner-up	Third
2000	Oscar Galliazzo (ITA)	Stefano Galliazzo (ITA)	Daniel Ladurner (AUT)
2001	Oscar Galliazzo (ITA)	Daniel Ladurner (AUT)	Christian Montavon (SUI)
2002	Daniel Ladurner (AUT)	Oscar Galliazzo (ITA)	Dominik Dobler (AUT)
2003	Daniel Ladurner (AUT)	Oscar Galliazzo (ITA)	Dominik Dobler (AUT)
2004	Oscar Galliazzo (ITA)	Benoît Gamba (FRA)	Daniel Ladurner (AUT)
2005	Harry Perna (FRA)	Dominik Dobler (AUT)	Noredine Kadaoui (FRA)
2006	Daniel Ladurner (AUT)	Benoît Gamba (FRA)	Dominik Dobler (AUT)
2007	Harry Perna (FRA)	Daniel Ladurner (AUT)	Dominik Dobler (AUT)
2008	Daniel Ladurner (AUT)	Harry Perna (FRA)	Dominik Dobler (AUT)
2009	Daniel Ladurner (AUT)	Harry Perna (FRA)	Alexandre Lebrun (FRA)
2010	Harry Perna (FRA)	Angelo Vecchi (ITA)	Cedric Buxin (ITA)
2011	Harry Perna (FRA)	Daniel Ladurner (AUT)	Christian Montavon (SUI)
2012	Daniel Ladurner (AUT)	Christian Montavon (SUI)	Nicolas Varin (FRA)
2013	Daniel Ladurner (AUT)	Alexandre Zweili (SUI)	Harry Perna (FRA)
2014	Moritz Nörl (GER)	Daniel Ladurner (AUT)	Harry Perna (FRA)
2015	Daniel Ladurner (AUT)	Angelo Vecchi (ITA)	Christian Montavon (SUI)
2017	Sébastien Rastegar (FRA)	Agustin Tussetto (ITA)	Christian Montavon (SUI)
2018	Renato Pennuti (ITA)	Agustin Tussetto (ITA)	Sylvain Behr (FRA)
2019	Sylvain Behr (FRA)	Luca Presti (ITA)	Andreu Greses (ESP)
2021	Renato Pennuti (ITA)	Tiziano Ferrari (ITA)	Sylvain Behr (FRA)
2022	Andreu Greses (ESP)	Pablo Tussetto (ITA)	Sébastien Rastegar (FRA)
2024	Renato Pennuti (ITA)	Juan Barrera (COL)	Pablo Soler (ESP)
2026	José Mejía (COL)	Juan Barrera (COL)	Carlos Quiroga (COL)

==== Time trial ====
Year	Winner	Runner-up	Third
2017	Nicolas Varin (FRA)	Agustin Tussetto (ITA)	Sébastien Rastegar (FRA)
2021	Renato Pennuti (ITA)	Sylvain Behr (FRA)	Tiziano Ferrari (ITA)
2022	Andreu Greses (ESP)	Sébastien Rastegar (FRA)	Tiziano Ferrari (ITA)
2024	Renato Pennuti (ITA)	Adrian Gumanita (ROM)	Carlos Quiroga (COL)
2026	Pablo Soler (ESP)	Daniele Vecchi (ITA)	Juan Agudelo (COL)

==== Inline cross ====
Year	Winner	Runner-up	Third
2017	Sébastien Rastegar (FRA)	Agustin Tussetto (ITA)	Christian Montavon (SUI)

=== Women ===
==== Downhill race ====
Year	Winner	Runner-up	Third
2000	Gabi Leuenberger (SUI)	Elisabeth Schrenk (AUT)	Sandra Ladurner (AUT)
2001	Elisabeth Schrenk (AUT)	Gabi Leuenberger (SUI)	Sandra Ladurner (AUT)
2002	Séverine Thomas (FRA)	Gabi Leuenberger (SUI)	Natacha Pontus (FRA)
2003	Gabi Leuenberger (SUI)	Sandra Ladurner (AUT)	Séverine Thomas (FRA)
2004	Séverine Thomas (FRA)	Elisabeth Schrenk (AUT)	Tina Jauss (GER)
2005	Séverine Thomas (FRA)	Marjorie Philippoteau (FRA)	Sandra Ladurner (AUT)
2006	Séverine Thomas (FRA)	Marjorie Philippoteau (FRA)	Valentina Liguori (ITA)
2007	Séverine Thomas (FRA)	Marjorie Philippoteau (FRA)	Emilie Sadoux (FRA)
2008	Séverine Thomas (FRA)	Marjorie Philippoteau (FRA)	Sandra Ladurner (AUT)
2009	Séverine Thomas (FRA)	Marjorie Philippoteau (FRA)	Emilie Sadoux (FRA)
2010	Séverine Thomas (FRA)	Marjorie Philippoteau (FRA)	Marie Marchand (FRA)
2011	Séverine Thomas (FRA)	Emilie Sadoux (FRA)	Marjorie Philippoteau (FRA)
2012	Marjorie Philippoteau (FRA)	Marie Marchand (FRA)	Michelle Buchholzer (AUT)
2013	Marjorie Philippoteau (FRA)	Annalena Rettenberger (GER)	Emilie Sadoux (FRA)
2014	Séverine Thomas (FRA)	Marjorie Philippoteau (FRA)	Annalena Rettenberger (GER)
2015	Séverine Thomas (FRA)	Martina Paciolla (ITA)	Annalena Rettenberger (GER)
2017	Martina Paciolla (ITA)	Emilie Sadoux (FRA)	Valentina Börsig (GER)
2018	Claudia Massara (ITA)	Martina Paciolla (ITA)	Séverine Thomas (FRA)
2019	Claudia Massara (ITA)	Valentina Börsig (GER)	Annalena Rettenberger (GER)
2021	Romane Favia (SUI)	Martina Pacciolla (ITA)	Sabrina Vitarelli (ITA)
2022	Romane Favia (SUI)	Alef Torres (COL)	Esmeralda Flores (MEX)
2024	Alef Torres (COL)	Miriam Fatmi (ESP)	Valentina Vargas (CHI)
2026	Alef Torres (COL)	Sabrina Vitarelli (ITA)	Danae Gómez (CHI)

==== Time trial ====
Year	Winner	Runner-up	Third
2017	Emilie Sadoux (FRA)	Valentina Börsig (GER)	Martina Paciolla (ITA)
2021	Martina Paciolla (ITA)	Romane Favia (SUI)	Sofia Dalla Vecchia (ITA)
2022	Romane Favia (SUI)	Martina Paciolla (ITA)	Emilie Sadoux (FRA)
2024	Romane Favia (SUI)	Valentina Vargas (CHI)	Alef Torres (COL)
2026	Alef Torres (COL)	Esmeralda Flores (MEX)	Danae Gómez (CHL)

==== Inline cross ====
Year	Winner	Runner-up	Third
2017	Martina Paciolla (ITA)	Emilie Sadoux (FRA)	Valentina Börsig (GER)
