= Roller skiing =

Sport discipline

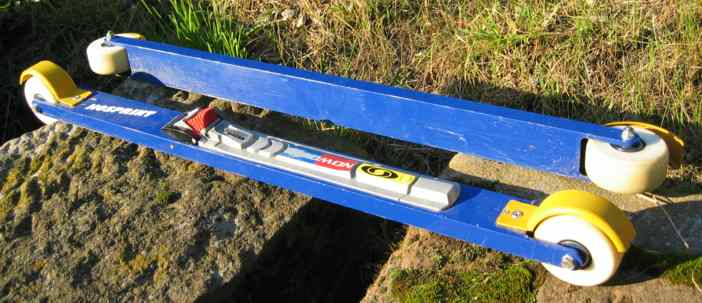
Roller skis

Roller skiing is an off-snow equivalent to cross-country skiing. Roller skis have wheels on their ends and are used on a hard surface to emulate cross-country skiing. The skiing techniques used are very similar to techniques used in cross-country skiing on snow, however they cannot be used for easy traversal in the same way.

First created as a summer training exercise, roller skiing grew into a competitive sport in its own right. Annual championships are held in various locations around the world. Most, if not all, national cross-country ski teams around the world roller ski during the off-season for specific physical training simulating winter skiing. In Norway, separate roller ski facilities have been constructed to allow exercise off public roads.

== History ==
The first roller skis were built in the mid-1930s in Italy and Northern Europe. In the early 1950s, when cross-country skiing started to evolve to a serious competition sport, the necessity for good summer training grew. Starting in the 1950s people experimented with skis on wheels. In the 1970s, something of a standard emerged and the first races took place. At this time all roller skis had one wheel in front and two wheels at the back. The metal frame was between 70 and 100 centimetres (2'4" and 3'4") long.

Athletes felt they could start to engage themselves in competitions. In 1976, Giustino Del Vecchio, an air pilot, established a record in Monza by doing 240.5 kilometres (149.4 mi) in 24 hours on the roller skis he had designed, using material and technologies from the aircraft industry; narrow solid wheels with hard tread, reverse lock-up ball bearings to enable a forward push off the inactive ski.

In the beginning, the skis were developed with one wheel in front and two wheels behind. The introduction of skating (free technique) in cross-country skiing changed athletes' training needs, which consequently impacted the design of roller skis. New roller skis with two wheels instead of three and much lighter materials could be used both for the classic style and skating.

== Competition ==
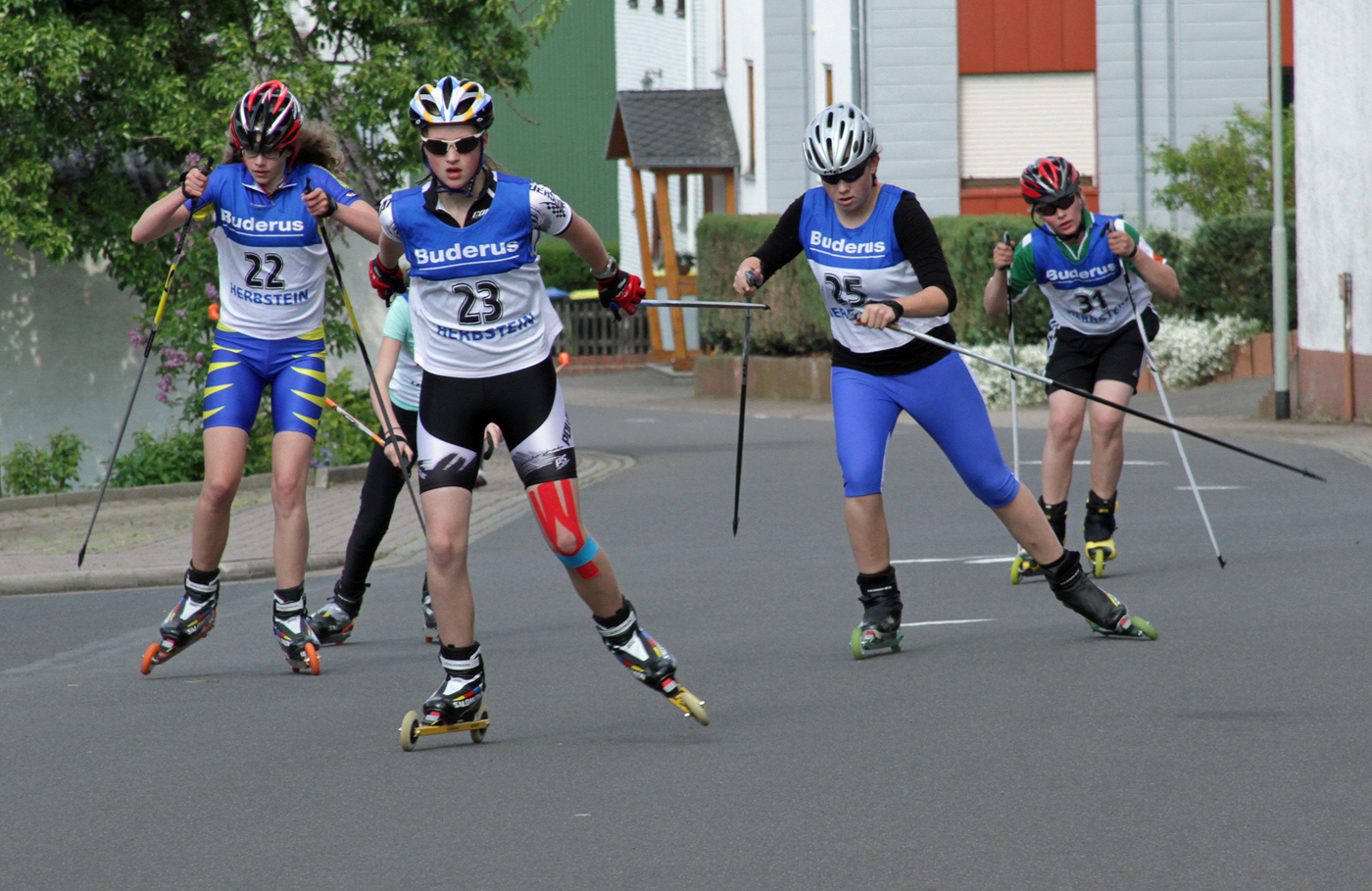
Roller skiing race—Skating technique.

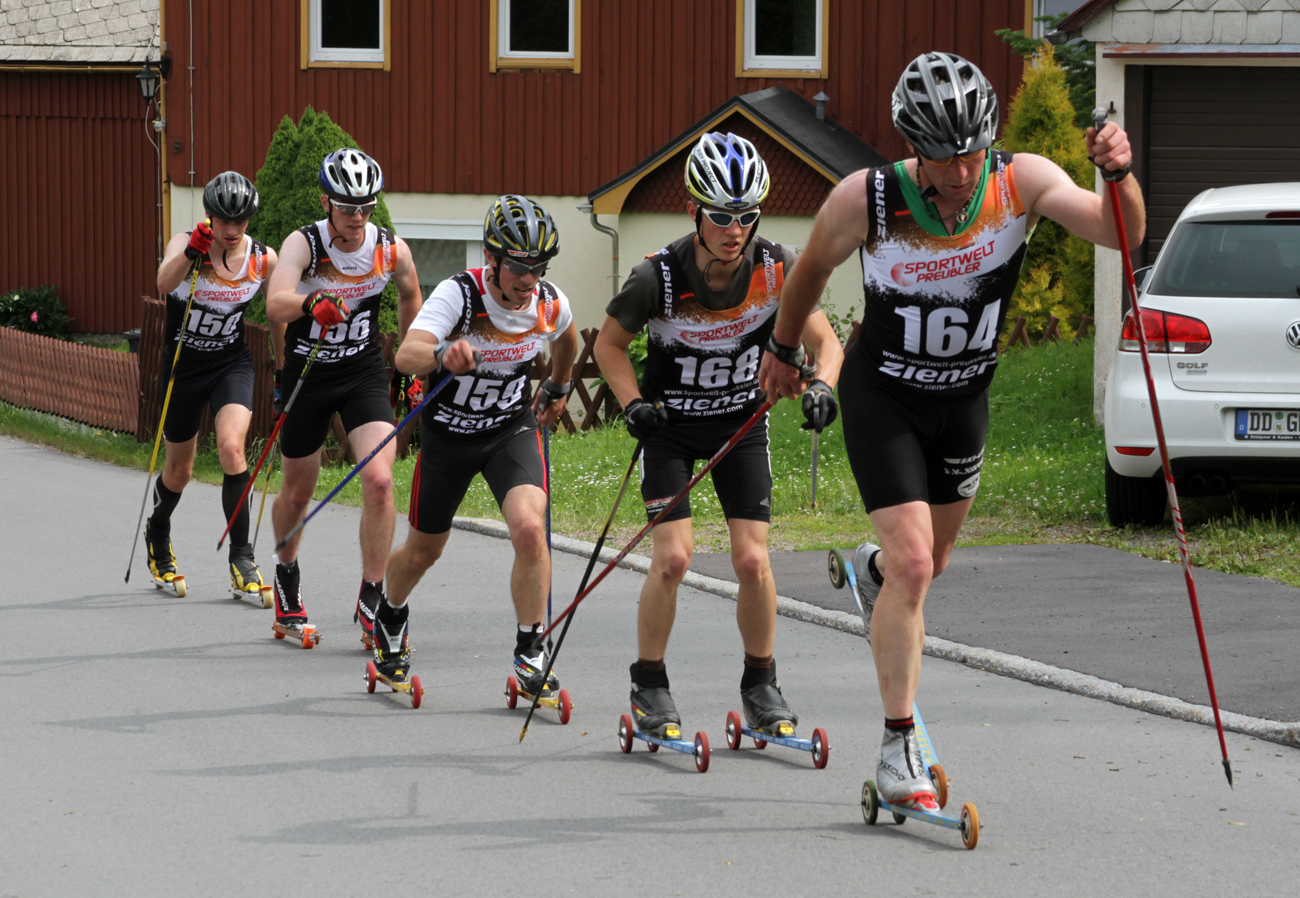
Roller skiing race—Classic technique.

The European Rollerski Federation was established around 1985, and the first European Rollerski Championships were organized in the Netherlands in 1988.

The growth of the roller ski sport attracted the notice of the International Ski Federation, or FIS (Federation Internationale de Ski). In 1992, the FIS recognized roller skiing as a sport distinct from cross-country skiing.

The first World Games were held in The Hague in 1993, and the first World Cup roller ski races later in the same year. In 1998, in Prague, the FIS granted roller skiing an official FIS World Championships. On 30 August- 3 September 2000, these competitions took place in the Netherlands.

Races have a variety of formats with different terrain. Formats include relays, sprints, team races, individual races and pursuit races. Terrain varies from relatively flat to hilly. On flat courses the speed can be as fast as 50 kilometres per hour (30 miles per hour). Average speed on flat tracks in World Cup races can easily be 30 kilometres per hour (20 miles per hour). As in regular cross-country skiing, the skiers compete in classic and freestyle. Helmets and protective eyeglasses in competitions are mandatory.

=== World Cup and World Junior and Senior Championships ===
Like their cross-country counterparts, the Italian, Russian, Norwegian, Swedish, German and French rollers have been very strong in competitions compared to other nations since the beginning of competitive roller skiing. Note that World Roller Skiing championships are not officially sanctioned races by FIS or recognized sports governing bodies. FF Rollerskis from Norway is the only FIS approved rollerski brand in the world. FF Rollerskis can use FIS Product Supplier in their marketing and on their rollerskis.

==== Men ====
So far, the World Cup and World Championships have been dominated by a few skiers. Successful roller skiers include Italian Alfio di Gregorio, who has won the World Games three times and World Cup four times; Russian Igor Glushkov, who has won the World Cup three times; and Frenchman Vincent Vittoz, who won the World Championships in 2002.

==== Women ====
Mateja Bogatec from Italy has been one of the most successful female rollers since the beginning of the FIS World Cup in 2000.

==== Euro Cup / Asia Cup ====
FIS Ski Asian Cup 2025 Championships concluded in Kazakhstan on 7 September 2025. In 2026 it is time for the second FIS ASIA Cup on rollerskis. This event is an effort to include more nations in the FIS Point - collecting and secure more nations attending during the winter games as well.

== Equipment ==
Roller skis for classic and skate style skiing are used, as well as "combi" skis which may be used for either technique. Off-road rollerskis are a variation designed for rougher surface conditions.

Classic style rollerskis usually have wide wheels to improve balance and better simulate classic ski technique. The wheel diameter is often less than 75mm to reduce the overall weight of the rollerskis. A ratchet mechanism is installed in either the front or rear wheel of each classic rollerski to allow uni-directional travel and simulate propulsion from classic ski strides on snow. The non-ratcheted wheel on each classic rollerski is free-rolling.

Skate rollerski wheels are usually 24 millimetres (0.94 in) wide (similar to those used on inline skates) with a wheel diameter of 100mm. 105mm skate rollerski wheels are a less common standard. Pneumatic rollerski wheels are also available but are especially rare and require pneumatic specific rollerskis. Pneumatic roller ski wheels have significantly greater diameter than non-pneumatic rollerski wheels. Both wheels on skate rollerskis are free-rolling.

Rollerski shafts may be composed of many different materials depending on the manufacturer and model. Wood was originally used, though this has mostly been replaced by aluminum, fiberglass, kevlar, carbon fiber or a combination of these materials. The wheelbase of skate rollerskis is typically around 610mm while classic rollerskis generally have a wheelbase of at least 700mm. The longer shafts of classic rollerskis help provide a better simulation of snow skiing. Many manufacturers sell junior roller skis, with shorter shafts to reduce the overall weight for younger skiers. Longer shafts generally provide straighter tracking and more stability. Rollerskis also feel more balanced when the bindings are properly mounted as close to balance point as possible. The bindings should never be mounted in a place that allows the cross country boot to be attached behind the balance point of the rollerski.

Wheels are connected to rollerski shafts using arms that are either integrated into the shaft design or mounted to the shaft using bolts. Most composite rollerski frames made of fiberglass or carbon fiber have aluminum arms mounted with bolts.

There are also types of roller skis that have 3 wheels, with one on the front and two on the back. These are less common more recently due to extra weight on rear created tail drop.

Roller skis with pneumatic tires (such as skikes) are available for rough pavement and off-road use.

Normal cross-country ski bindings and ski boots can be used with most roller skis, though some manufacturers produce special roller ski versions for the warmer weather use including Alpina, Botas, and Fischer. Cross-country ski poles are also used, with the basket replaced by a ferrule, essentially a reinforced carbide steel spike molded into strong plastic.

Extra protective clothing is recommended: full-finger gloves, helmet, eyewear, and knee and elbow pads. Many ski training programs require the use of helmets while roller skiing.

There are differences in the design of skis intended for skating and classic style. One variant is designed as a hybrid and can be used for both styles. Classic skis have a mechanism that prevents the ski from rolling backward, eliminating the problem of poor grip. Skate skis usually have thinner wheels with a larger wheel diameter to best suit skating technique and are usually shorter than classic skis. Wheels are available with different rolling resistances to suit different needs. Some are interested in competition skis where low rolling resistance is important, while others want a higher rolling resistance for a better training effect. The type of rubber determines this, and rolling resistance is typically graded from 1 to 4, with 1 being the fastest and 4 being the slowest.

Newer models of roller skis include technological advances such as frames with built-in suspension to reduce vibrations from asphalt, resulting in less stress on joints and a more snow-like experience. A new innovation is braking technology that provides increased safety and control, especially on descents. For example, a Norwegian-developed system from FF Rollerskis features a brake pad that is activated by pushing down on the rear fender with the pole, providing effective braking without changing balance or position. This system can be applied to all types of roller skis, making it both user-friendly and environmentally friendly, as older skis can be retrofitted.

Roller skiing techniques are very similar to regular skiing; the same physical and skill requirements apply. Poles are the same length as snow, but a special hardened metal spike is used to withstand the wear and tear of asphalt. These spikes can be sharpened with a diamond file. To reduce wear and tear on the arms, there are pole grips with spring padding and special spikes that provide better cushioning. FF Rollerskis uses special vulcanized rubber to provide better cushioning for the user, making the ski more skilike.

Roller skis are braked by plowing, pulling one of the skis sideways, or using the new brake system from FF Rollerskis in Norway.

Roller skiing is most popular in Europe, particularly France, Italy, Norway, Finland, Estonia, Sweden, and Russia, where there are many serious races and a World Cup Circuit. In North America, roller skiing is popular in areas with many Nordic skiers such as Ontario, Alberta, Alaska, New York, Vermont, New Hampshire, Maine, Minnesota, Michigan, and Wisconsin.

== Nordic blading ==
Nordic blading is a sport which uses ski poles with special tips and inline skates or roller skis. The sport has been practiced for over 80 years and is undergoing a revival. The benefits of Nordic blading are similar to that of cross-country skiing if performed correctly. Nordic blading can be more risky than inline skating as the poles complicate balance and coordination.

=== Nordic cross skating ===
A variant, Nordic cross skating is also called Nordic inline skating or off-road skating or cross-country skating or Nordic blading. This sport activity (similar to roller skiing) combines snow cross-country skiing and inline skating. Typically uses specialized inline skates with two big all-terrain wheels (4-6 inch diameter, typically pneumatic) and special poles that the skater pumps like ski poles to make the skates go faster and provides a good workout for the majority of the major muscle groups, including upper body. Nordic skaters use a technique similar to the technique that cross-country skiers and inline skaters use. Nordic cross skating popularity is growing because of the range of fitness benefits.

=== Types of techniques used ===
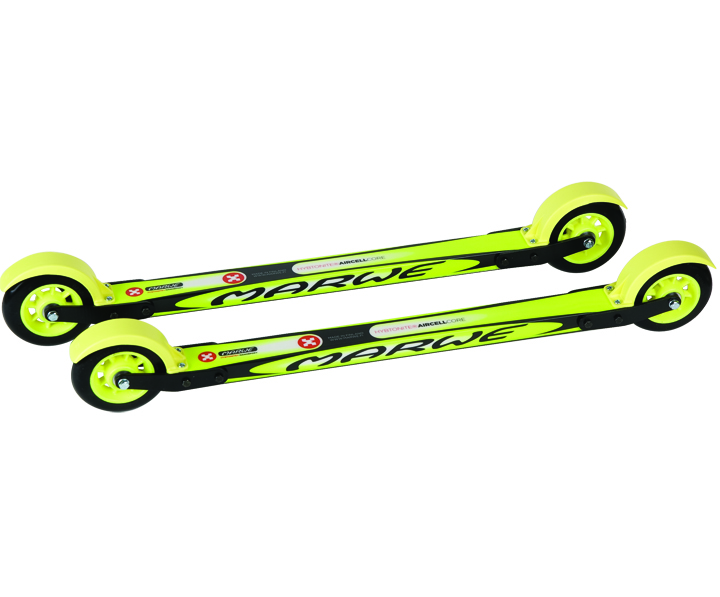
Marwe achieves flex by using a composite frame like a snow ski with aluminum forks bolted on.

- One-skate (V1)
- Two-skate (V2)
- Offset
- Free Skate
- Double Poling
- Diagonal Stride
- Double Pole-Kick (Step-Double pole)
- Downhill (Tuck, Free Skate, Slalom, etc.)

=== Equipment needed ===
- Roller skis
- Poles
- Boots
- Helmet
- Protective eyewear (optional; mandatory in some competitions)
- Gloves (recommended)
- Knee and elbow pads (recommended)

== See also ==
- Nordic skiing
- Nordic walking
- Grass skiing
- Skike

== Sources ==
- Kloth, Thomas (May 2009). Nordic Blading – Inline-Skating mal anders (PDF) (in German). Hofmann-Verlag.
