= Artistic roller skating =

Type of sport similar to figure skating

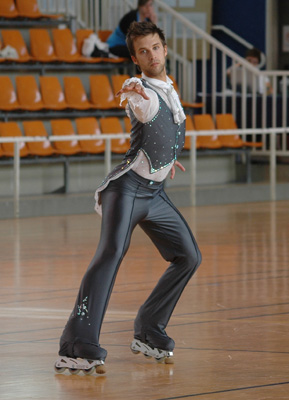
- A competitor during Artistic Skating World Championship
- Highest governing body: World Skate
- Nicknames: Roller skating

Characteristics
- Team members: Individuals, duos, or groups
- Mixed-sex: Yes
- Equipment: Roller skates
- Venue: Sports rinks

Presence
- Olympic: No
- World Games: 1981 – 2022

Artistic roller skating is a competitive sport similar to figure skating but where competitors wear roller skates instead of ice skates.

Artistic roller skaters use either quad or inline skates, though quad skates are more traditional and significantly more common. Generally, quad and inline skaters compete in separate events and not against each other. Inline figure skating has been included in the world championships since 2002 in Wuppertal, Germany.

The sport is similar to its counterpart on ice, with some differences in moves, technique, and judging. Many ice skaters started in roller skating or vice versa. Famous champion ice skaters who once competed in roller skating include Brian Boitano, Tara Lipinski and Marina Kielmann. Artistic roller skating is often considered to be more difficult because ice allows the skater to draw a deep edge to push off from when performing jumps such as a Lutz or an Axel and roller skates are heavier than their ice equivalents, making jumping harder.

Due to the 2022 Russian invasion of Ukraine, World Skate banned Russian and Belarusian athletes and officials from its competitions, and did not stage any events in Russia or Belarus in 2022.

== Roller skating disciplines ==
=== Figures ===
In figures, skaters trace figure circles painted on the surface of the floor. This is different from compulsory figures on ice, who skate on blank ice and draw their own circles, leaving tracings on the ice as they skate. The official dimension of plain figure circles, measured at their diameter is 6 meters (19 feet, 8 1/4 inches). The official dimension of smaller loop figure circles measure at 2.4 meters (7 feet, 10 1/2 inches). Circles are typically painted in "serpentines"—sets of three circular lobes.

The basic figures skated are typically referred to by numbers, the same as those skated by ice skaters, ranging from simple circle eights through serpentines (figures using one push for a circle and a half), paragraphs (figures using one push for two circles), and loops (smaller circles with a teardrop-shaped loop skated at the top of the circle). There is one category of simple figures (111 and 112) that are unique to roller skaters; these are serpentines that begin with a half circle skated on one foot, then change to the other foot, for the next circle, then change back to the other foot for another half circle. Some of the more basic figures are numbered 1, 2, 1B, 5A, 5B, 7A, 7B, 111A, 111B, 112A, and 112B, in which the letter B designates starting on the left foot. These figures are often taught as beginning figures for those just starting. They include simple circle eights, circle eights with three turns, and serpentines. More difficult figures include the use of turns like counters, brackets, and rockers, and they are numbered 19, 21, 22, 26, etc.

Judges in figure events consider the quality of the skater's tracing of the circle, clean takeoffs, edges and correct placement of turns. The skater's form and posture is emphasized as well.

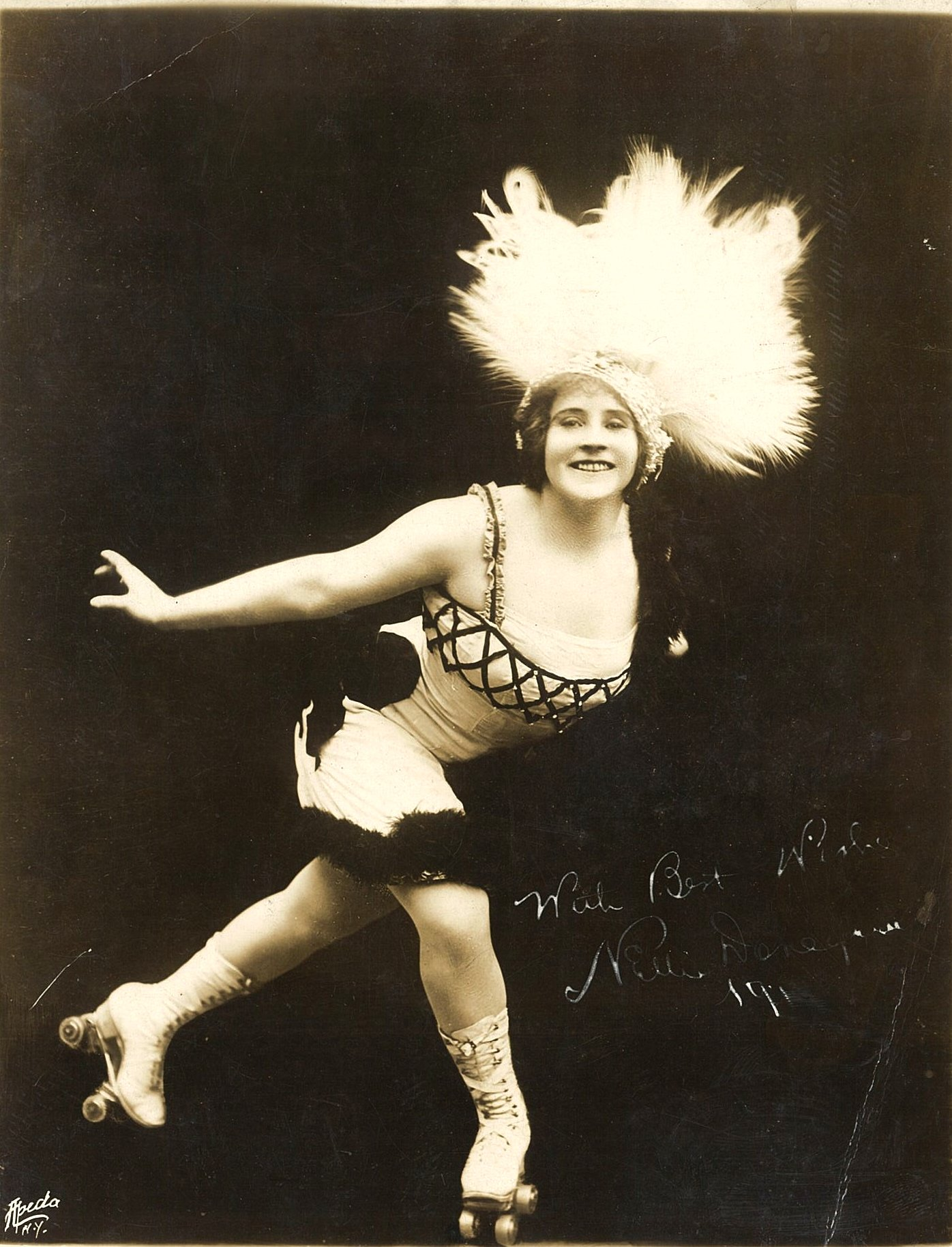
Nellie Donegan, 1913 Australia

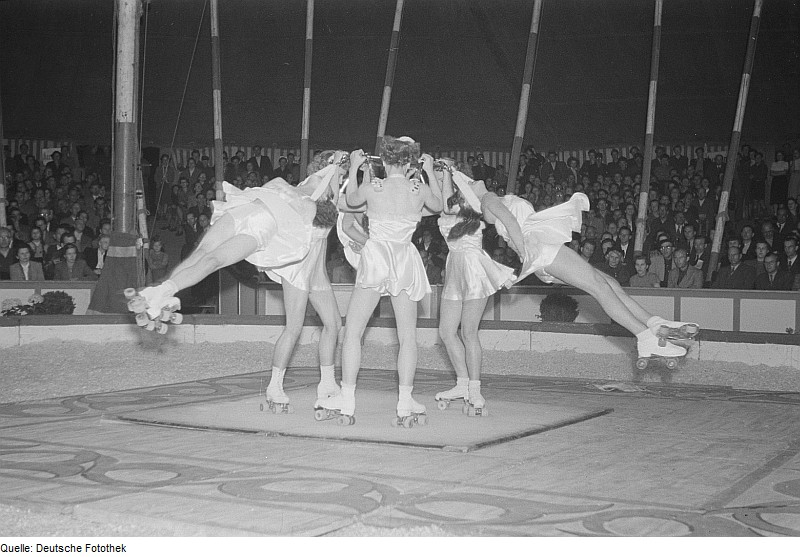
Germany in 1952

=== Dance ===
Dance roller skating contains three major sub-disciplines: compulsory dance, style dance and free dance.

Compulsory dance contains prescribed compulsory dances and steps that must be performed, such as the Imperial Tango, the 14 Step, the Keats Foxtrot , or the Flirtation Waltz. Some of the dances are the same as performed in ice dancing competition, while others are unique to roller skating.

Style dance has no limit of rhythms. Once chosen, the rhythm must be not changed.

Free dance is similar to the ice free dance, although with some rules changes. Skaters do not need to follow a pattern around the floor, but rather must be creative in their interpretation of the music.

Dance skating can be either solo or couple. For both, the programs consist of:

- Cadet, Youth, Junior and Senior: one style dance and one free dance.
- Espoir, Minis and Tots: compulsory dances and a free dance.

Original dance, also referred as Creative Solo Dance or CSD, consisted of a dance constructed of two rhythms chosen from a set of rhythms that FIRS changed every year. It incorporated up to two spins with no more than 3 revolutions and up to two jumps of no more than 1 revolution. This has a tighter pattern than a free dance, but is created by the skater or their coach. This pattern can be to any music, as long as it does not change speed. The pattern must be repeated twice, with opening and closing steps.

American Dance is performed only at the United States National level and below, and emphasizes keeping the upper body upright and free from movement. Some examples of American dances are the Fascination Foxtrot, Progressive Tango, and the California Swing.

=== Free skating ===
Executing a jump, video, 12 seconds

Artistic free skating (also known as freestyle) incorporates figure skating jumps, spins, and footwork into a program set to music. Most of the jumps done by freestyle roller skaters are similar to those performed in ice skating, with some nomenclature changed. A "toe loop" on ice is often referred to as a Mapes in roller skating, taking its name from the inventor of the jump. Though both ice and roller skaters perform the Euler jump (also called a "half-loop" or "Thorén"), it is more common in roller skating programs, as lengthy multi-jump combinations are emphasized in roller skating judging. The Euler is a useful connecting jump in such sequences; for example, a five-jump combination might be Axel, loop, double toe loop, Euler, double flip. The hardest part of a five jump combination is usually keeping up enough speed to complete the fifth jump, which can sometimes be the most technically difficult. The "loop" jump is also performed in roller skating, though ice skaters tend to "take off" with two feet, roller skaters do a one-foot take off.

Roller skating also traditionally emphasizes spins that are uncommon on ice, especially the inverted camel in which the skater is on an outside edge with their body and left leg extended outward parallel to the floor, the skater then rotates their hips 180 degrees while continuing to spin so that they are spinning upside down The inverted camel is generally performed by women; few men learn to do it and even fewer perform it in competition. Other spins popular in roller skating that would be impossible to do with the blades of an ice skate include the broken ankle, which begins as an inside-edge camel and the skater then pushes the skate over so that the spin is rotating on the edge of the two inner wheels, and the heel camel spin, which is only rotated on the back two wheels, or heel.

=== Precision ===
Precision roller skating consists of 12–24 athletes skating on the floor at one time moving as one flowing unit at high speeds. This discipline of precision skating is named because of the emphasis on maintaining precise formations and timing of the group.

For a precision team to flow in unison, individual skaters must be competent at a variety of skating skills, including speed, footwork and presentation. The team performs a program set to music, with required formations including circles, lines, blocks, wheels, and intersections. The teams are required to perform difficult step sequences involving a number of complicated turns.

There are international synchronized skating competitions at the Senior level, and the Federation Internationale de Roller Sports (FIRS) held the first world championship in precision roller skating in 2000. Teams may consist of men and women with Senior teams having 12–24 team members and Junior teams having 8–16 team members. Two scores are given, one for technical and one for artistic impression.

Precision roller skating owes its origin to synchronized skating on ice. The first synchronized figure skating team was formed by Dr. Richard Porter, who became known as the 'father of synchronized skating'. The 'Hockettes' skated out of Ann Arbor, Michigan and entertained spectators during the intermissions of the University of Michigan Wolverines men's ice hockey team. In the early days, precision skating resembled a drill team routine, or a precision dance company such as The Rockettes.

During the 1970s, the interest for this new sport spawned tremendous growth and development. In each season, teams developed more creative and innovative routines incorporating stronger basic skating skills, new maneuvers and more sophisticated transitions with greater speed, style and agility. Due to the interest in the sport in North America, other countries took notice, leading to the World Championships. With the internationalization of the sport, it has evolved rapidly, with increasing emphasis on speed and skating skills.

Although not an official part of the Olympics, attempts have been made by the authorities in charge to gain official acceptance of this sport. Precision roller skating has received publicity from the magazines Roller Skating and USARS ever since its beginning. This sport is accepted as a varsity sport in only a few universities, and precision roller skating have been considered for future Olympics acceptance.

=== Creative solo/free dance ===
Artistic roller skaters who participate in this event most likely do solo dance or team dance. This event requires the coach and skater to select a song that can stay appropriate for any age. It is up to the coach or choreographer to design a routine that has a maximum of three jumps and two spins and has some dance moves such as swings, runs, etc.. As of the 2016–2017 season, USARS has decided to add tumbling to their total score, allowing skaters to do optional cartwheels, splits and other forms of tumbling.

This event is taken to the World Championships, however, only for Junior World Class and World Class Skaters only, these skaters are asked to compete in an international-style creative which can be French theme, African Theme, European Theme and the most popular: Spanish Themed. As of the 2015–2016 skating season, USARS opened up an Elementary International Creative Solo/Free dance event which allows 12 year olds and under to participate in an international-style routine that would be taken to regional and national championships. This event can be a combined, combining with international solo dance scores as a potential spot to go to nationals.

To skate the combined event at regionals/nationals, skater must pay a separate entry fee to have the scores for International free dance and International Solo Dance combined for a chance to get an extra medal and extra ticket to nationals.

=== Style dance ===
The style dance is an event only participants can compete in for Junior and Senior World Class (the skaters trying to make it on the world team for their country). The style dance is international, which means it must have an international flare. Music can be in any language, and costume has to match the music theme. It has solo and couple events.

The style dance does not need to have jumps or spins but does require repetitions of the given dance. This event is dance but does require a toe stop as there is footwork that needs to be included.

=== Inline ===
In inline figure skating, a short program is followed by a long program.

== Equipment ==
=== Skates ===
Artistic roller skaters skate on quad skates or inline skates (for the inline free skating discipline). Skates consist of four essential parts: boots, plates, wheels, and bearings. Skaters may sometimes use jump bars on their plates for added stability. Free skaters (both quad and inline) have a toe stop on their plates. While plates are usually long lasting and durable, boots, wheels, and toe stops need to be replaced as they wear down with use.

==== Boots ====
Boots used in artistic roller skating are traditionally made of leather, but contemporary boots are often crafted using synthetic materials. While there are boots made specifically for artistic roller skating, skaters may choose to use ice boots, though the use of ice boots is mostly prominent in inline skating. The style of boot varies based on the personal preference and the discipline the skate is used to skate in. In general, free skating boots are stiff to support skaters' ankles and prevent injury as they spin and jump. In the figures discipline, stiff boots are used for circle figures while slightly softer boots are used for loop figures. Dance boots are the most flexible and soft, with a low cut back for ankle mobility, allowing the skater to point their foot and create aesthetic lines with their leg. Boots come in many different brands, some of the most popular being Riedell, Edea, Risport, Harlick, SP Teri, and Jackson.

==== Inline frames (plates) ====
Frames designed for inline artistic skating have three or four rockered wheels with a toe stop or toe "pic" placed at the front. Rockered wheels (wheels which are arranged at different heights so that the baseline of the wheels forms a curve instead of a flat line) are more suitable to simulate the curved blades on ice and achieve deep edges needed to perform footwork and spins. Popular inline frame brands include Snow White, PIC, Roll-line, Golden Horse (GH Skates), and STD Skates.

==== Quad plates ====
Quad plates designed for artistic skating vary in design based on the discipline they are created for. Professional and mid-level plates are made of a strong lightweight metal like aluminum, stainless steel, or titanium. Entry-level plates can be made of nylon or other plastics. Freestyle and creative solo plates will have toe stops at the front to execute jumps (used in the take-off of jumps such as the toe loop or the flip), spins, and footwork. For compulsory dance and figures where toe stops are unnecessary and may impair the skater's mobility, plates will often have no receptacle for a toe stop; the skater may also choose to remove the existing toe stops from their plate and replace it with a jam plug or mini stopper. For loop figures, skaters will often mount a shorter plate to their boot for maximum maneuverability. Some dance plates have a lower center of gravity for extra stability. Popular quad plate brands include Roll-line, RollerSkates Italia, Atlas, and Snyder.

==== Wheels ====
Quad wheels are made of polyurethane and come in varying sizes and hardnesses. The size of a wheel is determined by two dimensions: height and contact width (how much of the wheel touches the floor). Typically, a 62mm height is used for dance, 63mm used for circle figures, 60mm used for loop figures, and a more maneuverable 55 or 57mm wheel used for freestyle. The contact width of an artistic wheel is very small, around 30–32mm.

The hardness (or durometer) determines the grip and slip of a wheel. Durometer is measured either on the A or D shore scales, where a higher number is a harder and more slippery wheel. Skaters may choose wheels based on their skating discipline and the floor type they are skating on (wood, sport court, concrete, etc.). Normally, a harder wheel with more slip is used for turn figures. Figure skaters often elect to use a mix of wheel hardnesses on their skates to optimize turning and acceleration, with a softer "push" wheel. Freestyle skaters tend to use a mix of hardnesses on skates, using a harder wheel on the edge they need to spin and a softer wheel on the other edges. A typical freestyle wheel will range from 92A–103A or 35D–61D. A softer wheel with more grip is used for dance. Popular quad wheel brands include Roll-line, Rollerbones, Komplex, and Boiani.

Inline wheels have a rounded profile and small contact widths. The typical range for inline wheel heights are 62–80mm. Typical hardness will be from 82A–90A. Inline artistic skaters have a more limited choice in wheels due to the fact that the wheel brand is often specific to and must correspond to the frame's brand to properly fit.

==== Bearings ====
Ball bearings are placed in wheels and allow them to roll. Typically, 7mm bearings are used on quad artistic skates, but 8mm bearings can be used on certain plates that have an 8mm axle. Most inline skates use 8mm bearings. The ABEC rating determines the tolerances in the bearing; the higher the ABEC rating, the more tolerance. Steel ball bearings are most commonly used, but many figure skaters may use ceramic bearings.

== See also ==
- Artistic Skating World Championship
- Artistic roller skating at the World Games
- World Skate
- USA Roller Sports
- Figure skating jumps
