= Roller skating =

Sport, activity, or form of transportation

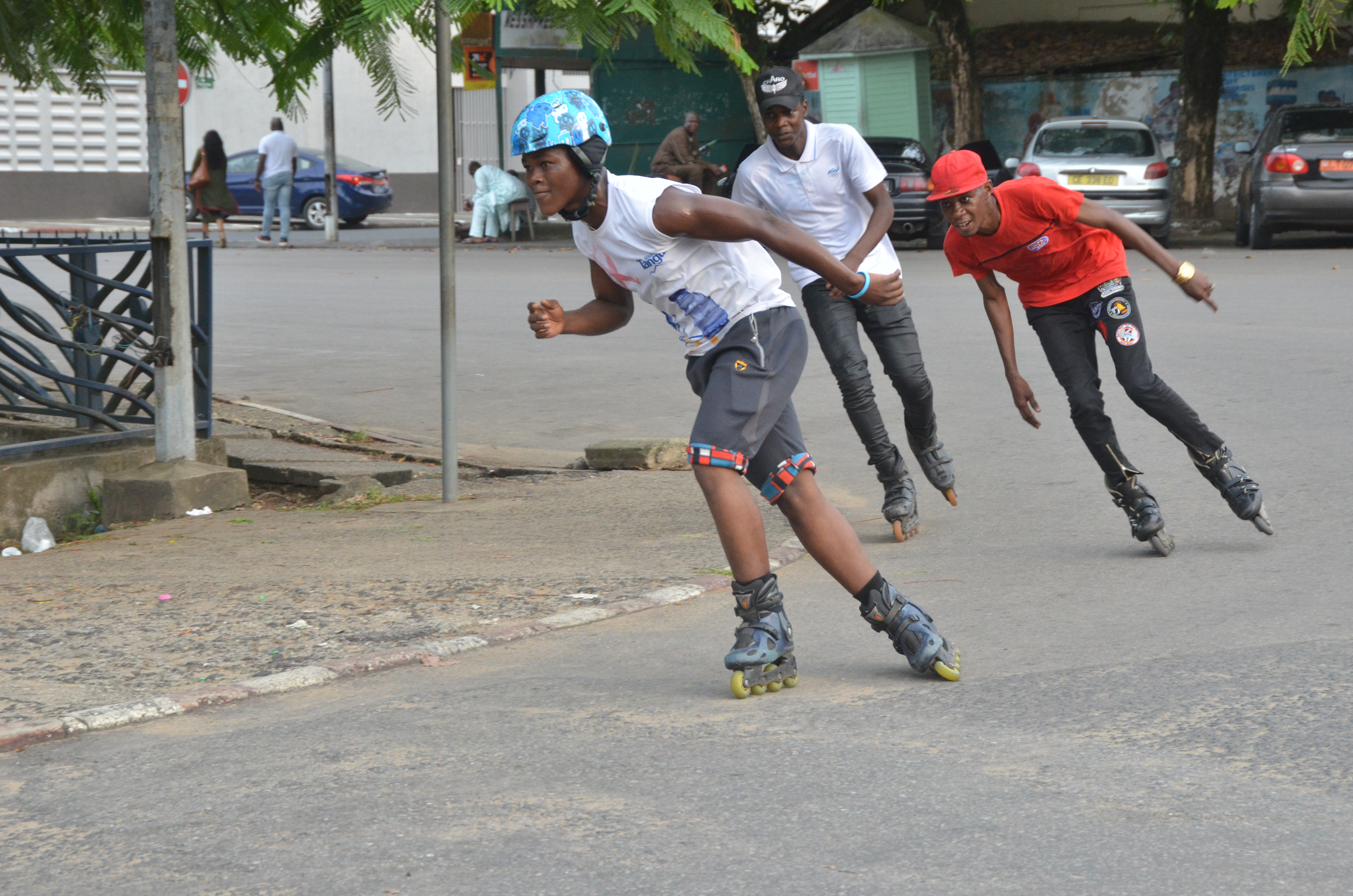
Inline skaters in Douala, Cameroon, 2010

Roller skating is the act of travelling on surfaces with roller skates. It is a recreational activity, a sport, and a form of transportation. Roller rinks and skate parks are built for roller skating, though it also takes place on streets, sidewalks, and bike paths.

Roller skating originated in the performing arts in the 18th century. It gained widespread popularity starting in the 1880s. Roller skating was very popular in the United States from the 1930s to the 1950s, then again in the 1970s when it was associated with disco music and roller discos. During the 1990s, inline outdoor roller skating became popular. Roller skating has often been a part of Black and LGBT history in particular.

Sport roller skating includes speed skating, roller hockey, roller derby, figure skating and aggressive inline skating.

== History ==
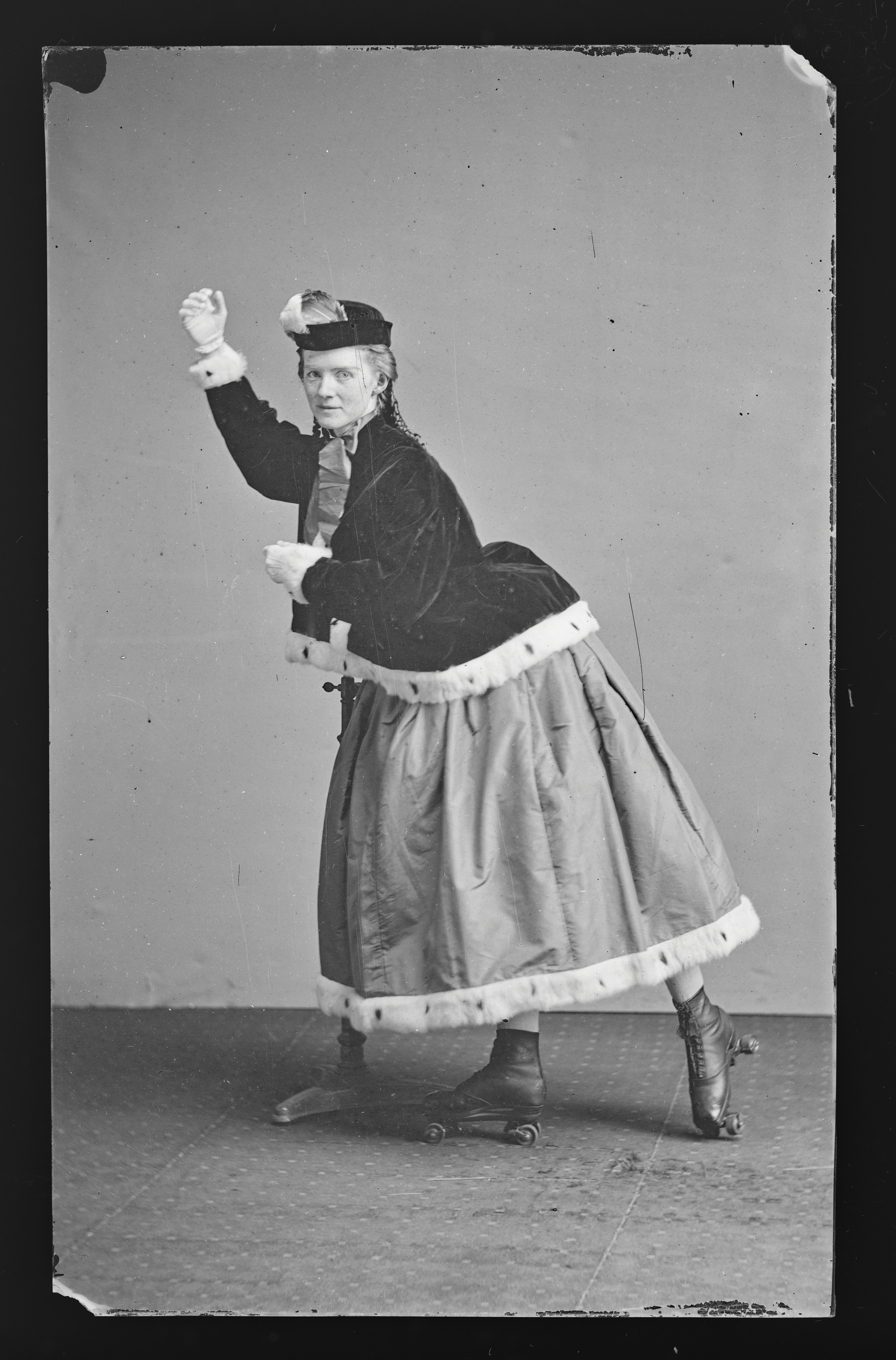
Unidentified woman roller skater, c. 1860–1870

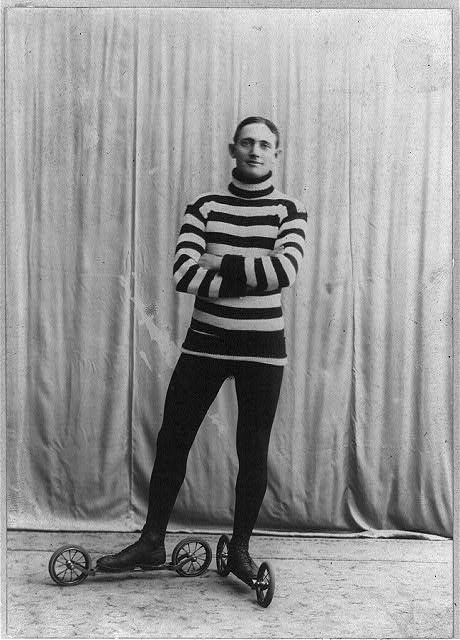
Roller skates in the United States around 1905

The earliest roller skates known are from 18th-century Europe. These skates were used in theater and musical performances, possibly to simulate ice skating onstage. Early roller skating was done in a straight line because turning or curving was very difficult with the primitive skate designs of the time. Limited to an occasional performance prop at the time, roller skating would not see widespread use until the 1840s.

Waitresses in an 1840s beer hall in Berlin used roller skates to serve customers. Ballet and opera of the late 1840s, such as Le prophète, featured roller skating. This helped to make roller skating popular for the first time, in 1850s Europe. Technological improvements, such as rubber wheels in 1859 and four-wheeled turning skates in 1863, contributed to the spread of roller skating. The popularity of roller skating has fluctuated greatly since then; it is typically called a "craze" at its high points.

1907 video of people roller skating

Roller skating boomed in popularity from 1880 to 1910; roller skates were mass produced and skating in rinks became popular with the general public in Europe, North and South America, and Australia. Specialized types of roller skating appeared in this period, such as figure skating and speed skating.

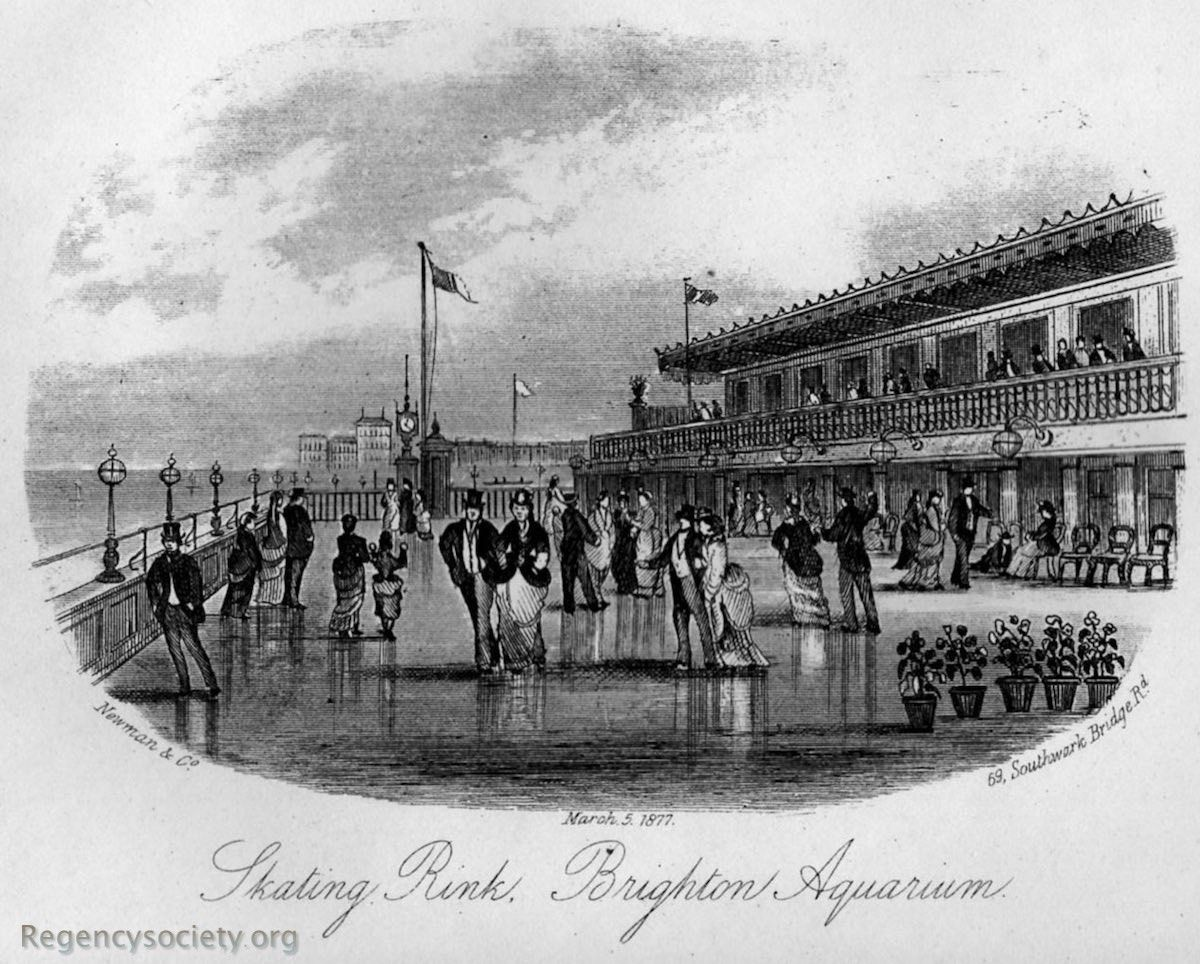
Skaters on the recently-opened terrace above the Brighton Aquarium, 5 March 1877 © Regency Society of Brighton

After a decline in popularity, roller skating became widespread again in the 1930s to the 1950s. This era is known as the golden age of roller skating. Many skating rinks offering electric organ music were built throughout the United States in this period.

In the 1970s, roller disco became widespread. This style of skating originated with disco music predominantly among Black and gay skaters. During the late 1980s and the 1990s, outdoor and indoor inline skating (with "rollerblades") became popular. Roller skating declined in popularity in the early 21st century, but became more popular again during the COVID pandemic.

Roller skating has long been tied to Black American social movements, immigrant communities, and the LGBT community, particularly for women in roller derby. As a hobby it is perceived as whimsical and is widely accessible to many people.

=== Historical timeline ===
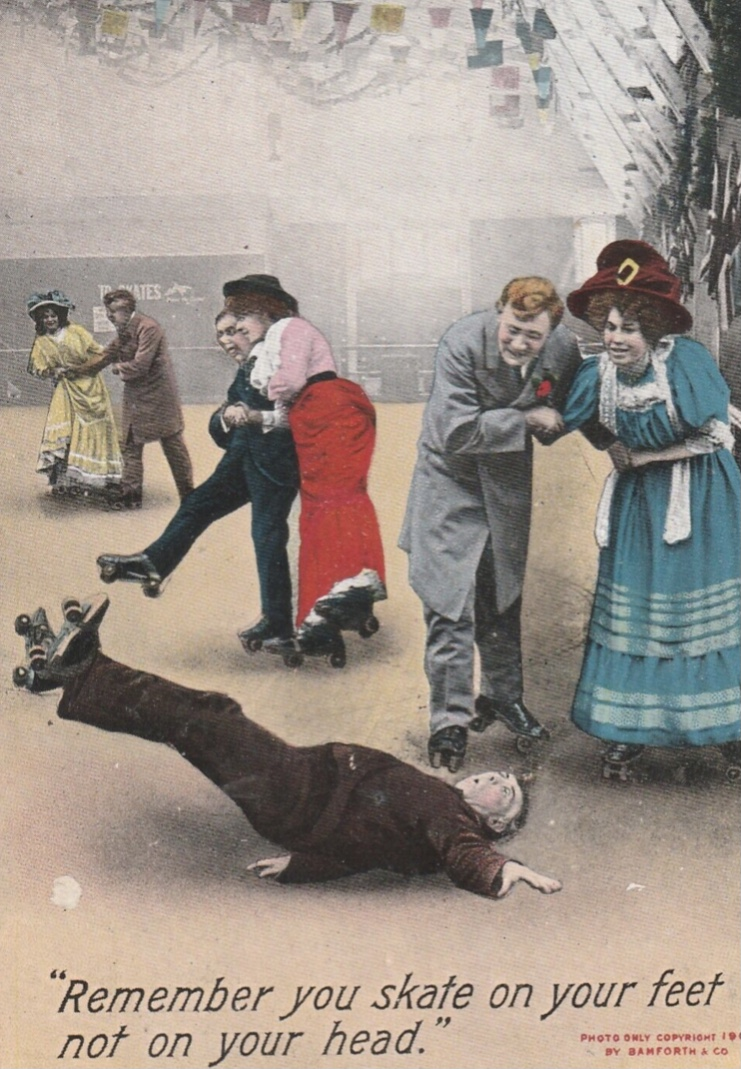
A humorous English postcard depicting indoor roller skating, 1908

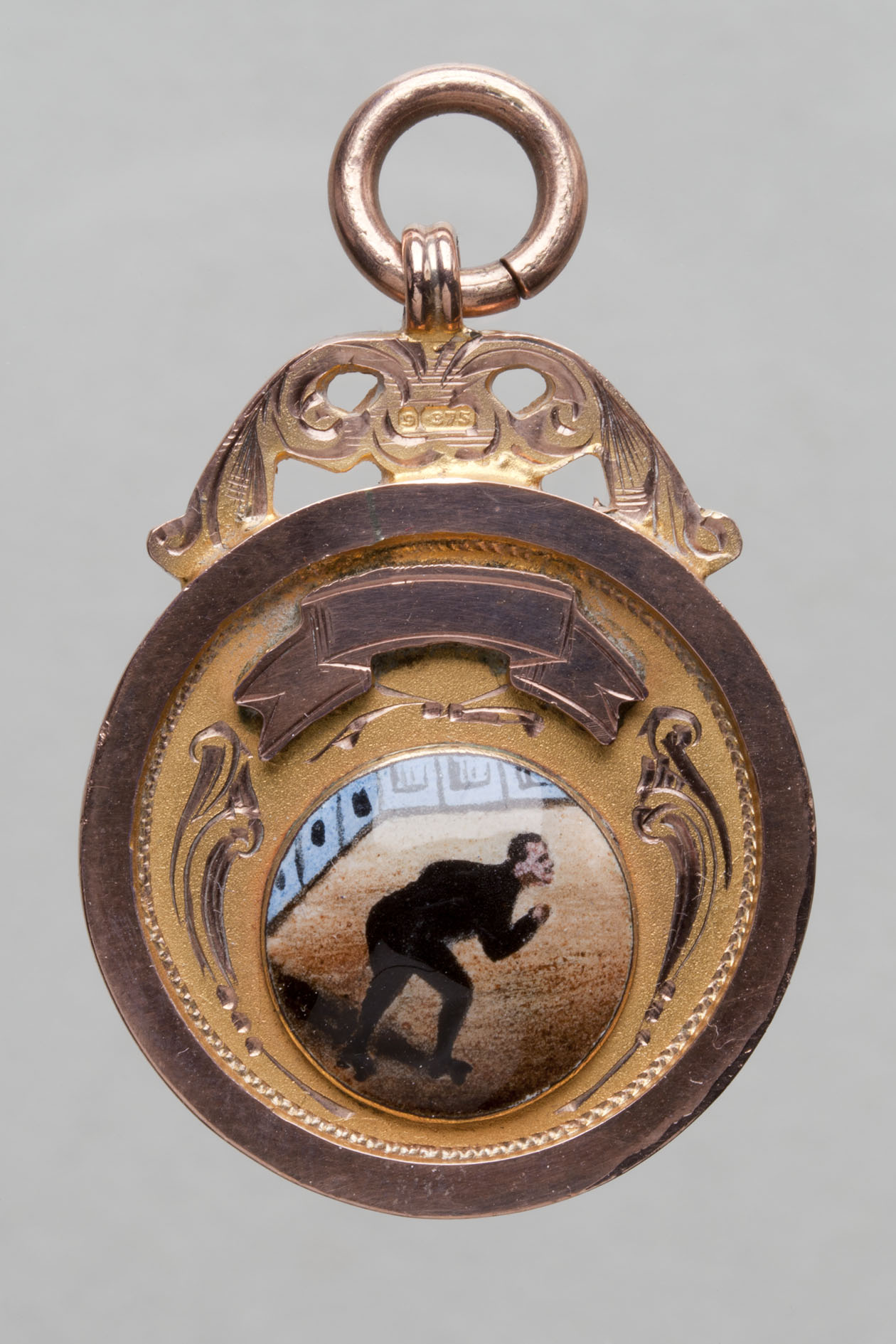
1931 Medal awarded to Robert Bruce for his amateur world record for non-stop roller skating at Aberdeen's Music Hall. His record breaking time was 61 hours and 36 minutes.

- 1743: First recorded use of roller skates, in a London stage performance. The inventor of this skate is unknown.
- 1760: First recorded skate invention, by John Joseph Merlin, who created a primitive inline skate with small metal wheels.
- 1818: Roller skates appeared on the ballet stage in Berlin.
- 1819: First patented roller skate design, in France by M. Petitbled. These early skates were similar to today's inline skates, but they were not very maneuverable. It was difficult with these skates to do anything but move in a straight line and perhaps make wide sweeping turns.

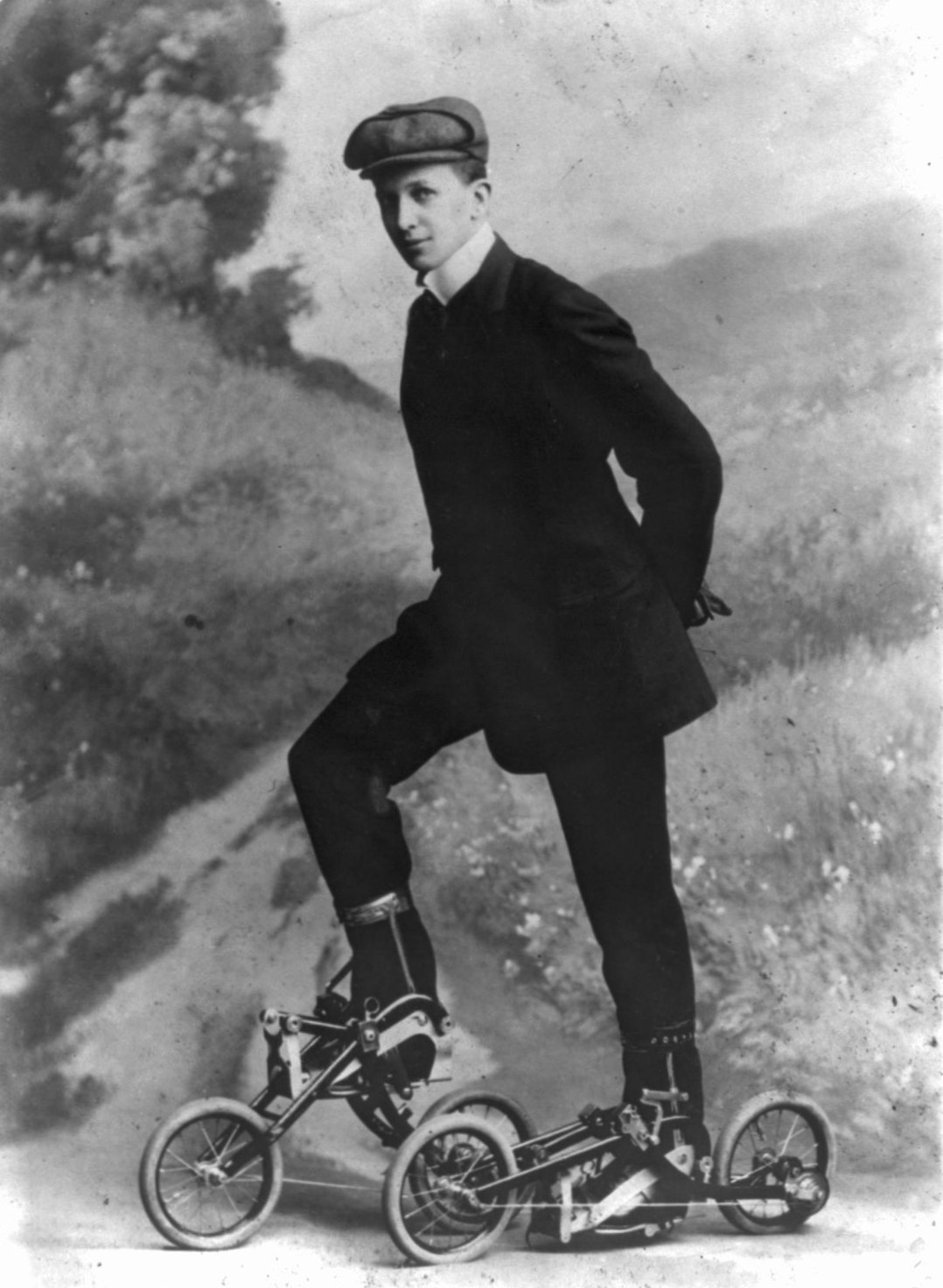
Young man on the Edvard Petrini's pedaled roller skates, known as Takypod in Sweden, circa 1910

- Rest of the 19th century: inventors continued to work on improving skate design.
- 1823: Robert John Tyers of London patented a skate called the Rolito. This skate had five wheels in a single row on the bottom of a shoe or boot.
- 1857: The hobby of roller skating gained enough momentum to warrant the opening of the first public skating rinks. The Strand, London and Floral Hall had these first roller rinks.
- 1863: The four-wheeled turning roller skate, or quad skate, with four wheels set in two side-by-side pairs (front and rear), was first designed, in New York City by James Leonard Plimpton in an attempt to improve upon previous designs. The skate contained a pivoting action using a rubber cushion that allowed the skater to skate a curve just by pressing his weight to one side or the other, most commonly by leaning to one side. It was a huge success, so much so that the first public roller skating rinks were opened in 1866, first in New York City by Plimpton in his furniture store and then in Newport, Rhode Island with the support of Plimpton. The design of the quad skate allowed easier turns and maneuverability, and the quad skate came to dominate the industry for more than a century.
- 1875: Roller skating rink in Plymouth, England held its first competition.
- 1876: William Brown in Birmingham, England, patented a design for the wheels of roller skates. Brown's design embodied his effort to keep the two bearing surfaces of an axle, fixed and moving, apart. Brown worked closely with Joseph Henry Hughes, who drew up the patent for a ball or roller bearing race for bicycle and carriage wheels in 1877. Hughes' patent included all the elements of an adjustable system. These two men are thus responsible for modern roller skate and skateboard wheels, as well as the ball bearing race inclusion in velocipedes—later to become motorbikes and automobiles. This was arguably the most important advance in the realistic use of roller skates as a pleasurable pastime.

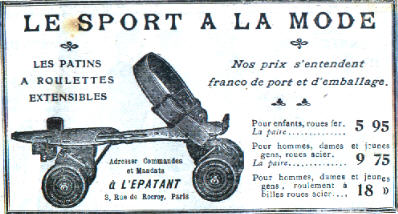
An advert for an early 20th-century model which fitted over ordinary shoes

- 1876: The toe stop was first patented. This braking implement provided skaters with the ability to stop promptly upon tipping the skate onto the toe. Toe stops are still used today on most quad skates, as well as some types of inline skates.
- 1877: The Royal Skating indoor skating ring building is erected rue Veydt, Brussels.
- 1878: In Boston, 17-year-old Pawnee skater Fred "Bright Star" Murree defeats Kenneth Skinner, the fastest speed skater in the area at the time. This begins Murree's career.
- 1880s: Roller skates were being mass-produced in America. This was the sport's first of several boom periods. Micajah C. Henley of Richmond, Indiana produced thousands of skates every week during peak sales. Henley skates were the first skate with adjustable tension via a screw, the ancestor of the kingbolt mechanism on modern quad skates.
- 1884: Levant M. Richardson received a patent for the use of steel ball bearings in skate wheels to reduce friction, allowing skaters to increase speed with minimum effort.
- 1898: Richardson started the Richardson Ball Bearing and Skate Company, which provided skates to most professional skate racers of the time, including Harley Davidson (no relation to the Harley-Davidson motorcycle brand).
  The design of the quad skate has remained essentially unchanged since then, and remained as the dominant roller skate design until nearly the end of the 20th century. The quad skate has begun to make a comeback recently due to the popularity of roller derby and jam skating.
- 1900: The Peck & Snyder Company patented an inline skate with two wheels.
- 1902: The Chicago Coliseum opened a public skating rink. Over 7,000 people attended the opening night.
- 1935: The Chicago Coliseum hosts the first Transcontinental Roller Derby with a pair of men and women and Chicago becomes the birthplace of roller derby.
- 1937: Roller skating the sport was organized nationally by the Roller Skate Rink Owner's Association and the onset of roller skating's golden age
- 1977: Inline skates looking like ice skates were used by DEFA, the East German state film studio, in the film „Die zertanzten Schuhe“ , based on the fairy tale The Twelve Dancing Princesses, in some winter scenes on a frozen lake.
- 1979: The roller disco trend in America occurs, highlighted in films like that year's Roller Boogie. Scott Olson and Brennan Olson of Minneapolis, Minnesota came across a pair of inline skates created in the 1960s by the Chicago Roller Skate Company and, seeing the potential for off-ice hockey training, set about redesigning the skates using modern materials and attaching ice hockey boots. A few years later Scott Olson began heavily promoting the skates and launched the company Rollerblade, Inc.
- 1983: President Ronald Reagan declared October National Roller Skating Month.
- 1993: Active Brake Technology, Rollerblade, Inc. developed ABT or Active Brake Technology for increased safety.
- 2020–2021: Roller skates are in short supply worldwide due to the COVID-19 pandemic.

== Gallery ==
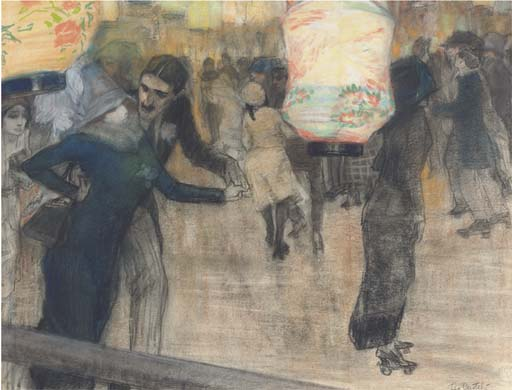
Dutch painter Leo Gestel's illustration of couples skating, c. 1909

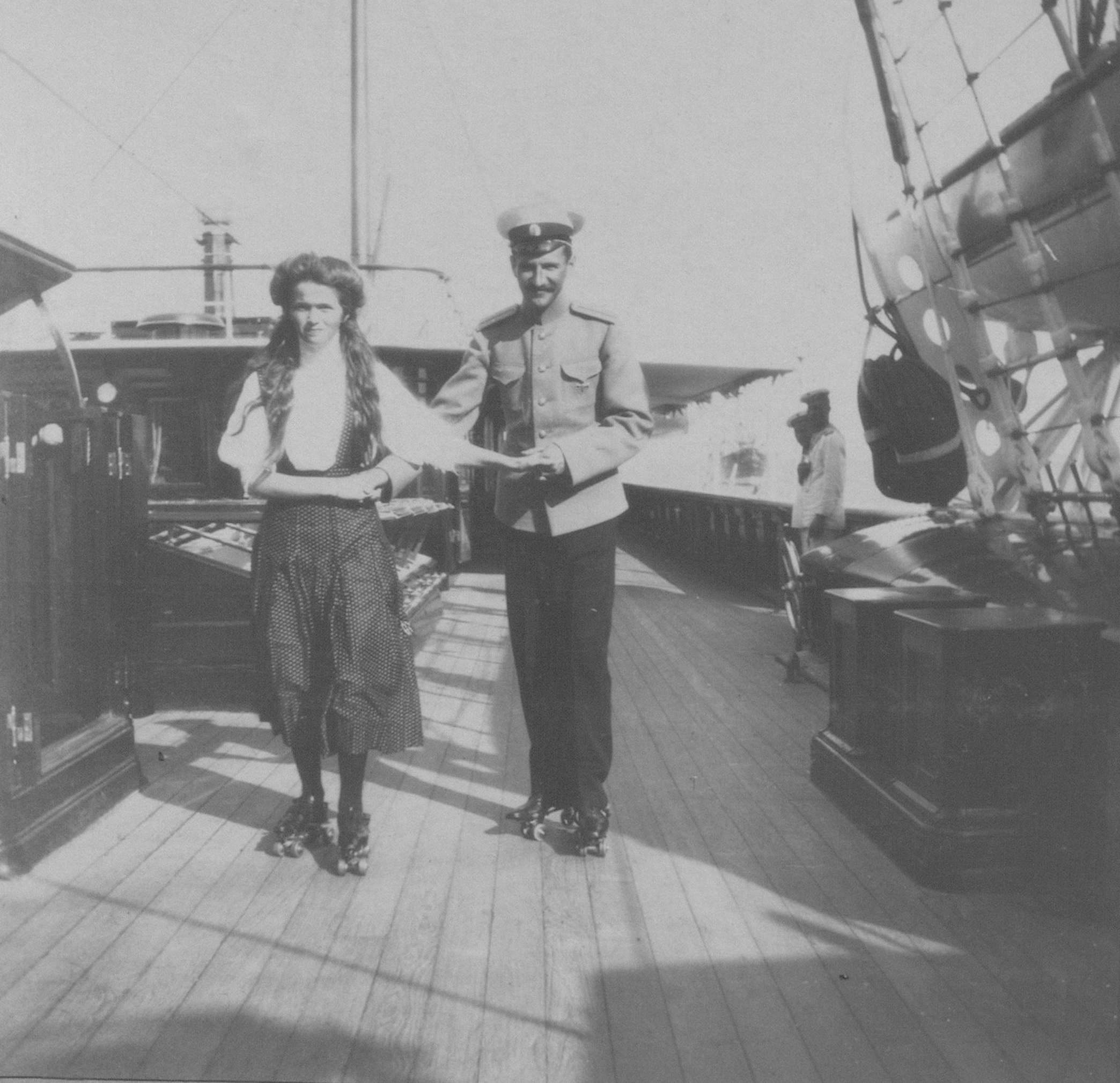
Grand Duchess Olga Nikolaevna of Russia in 1911 roller skating with the help of the officer Pavel Voronov aboard the Standart.

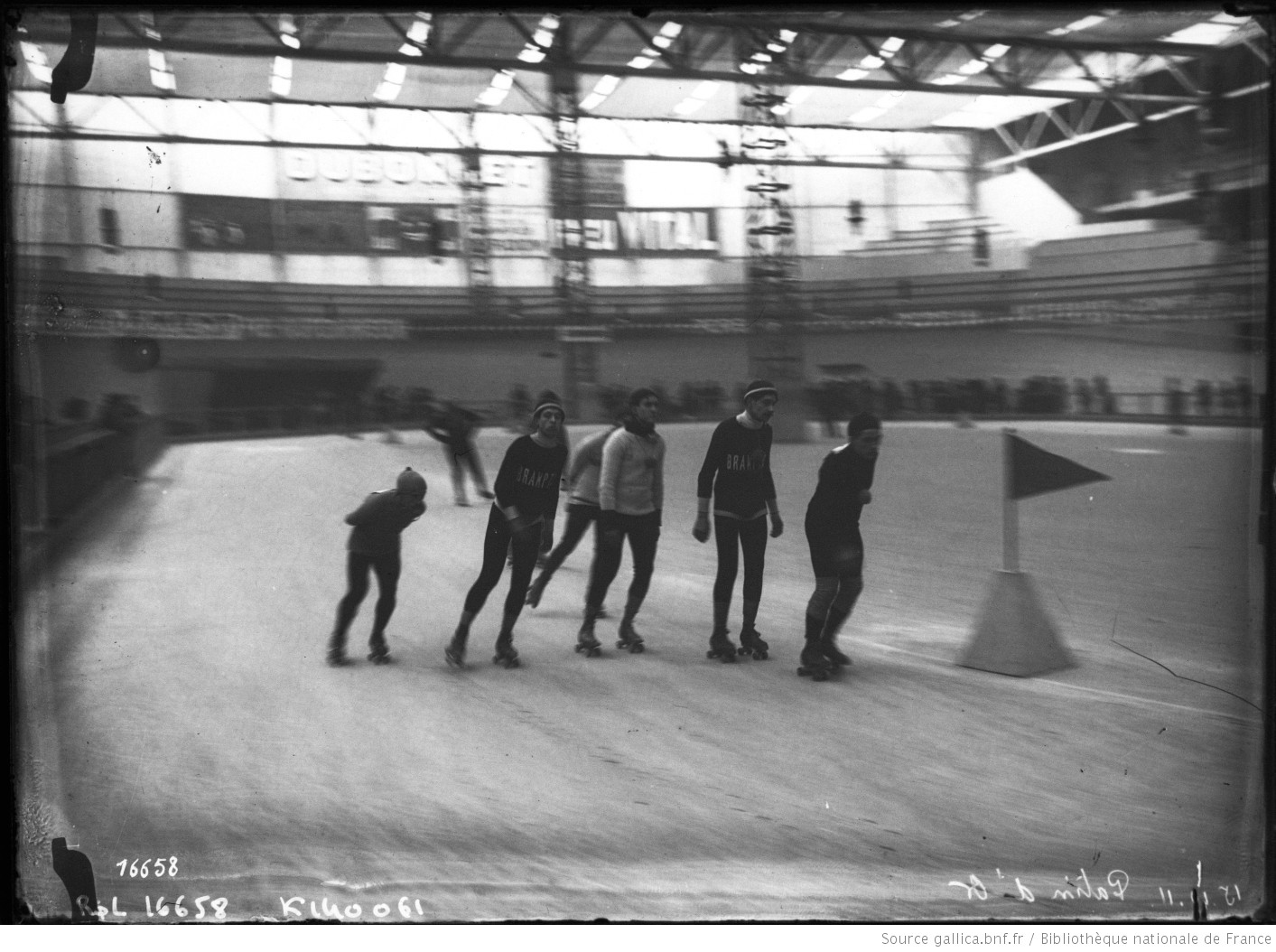
The Patin d'Or, a 24-hour roller skating endurance competition in Paris, 1911

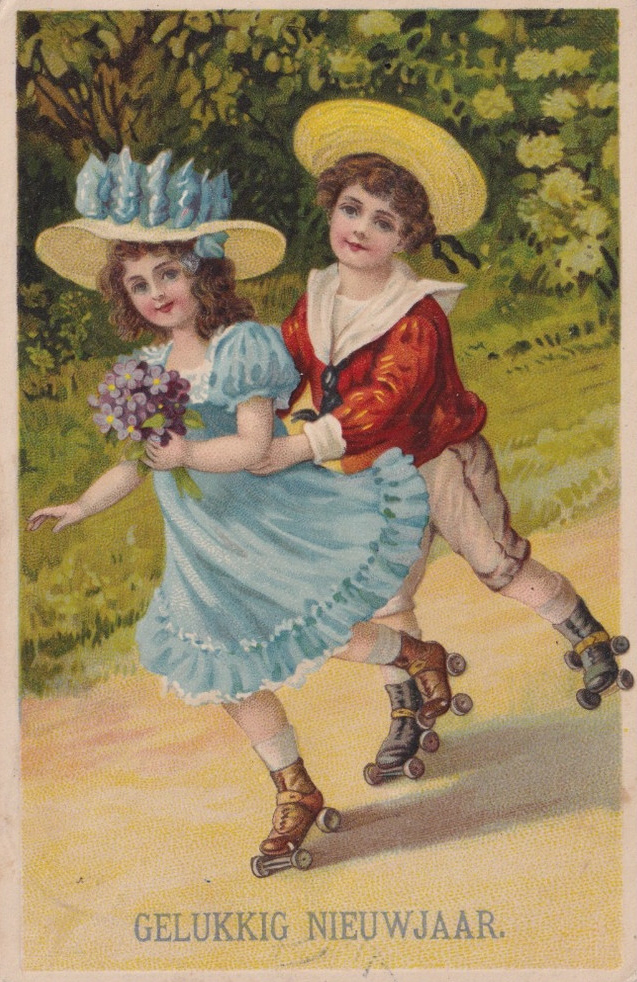
1918 Dutch New Year postcard, with an illustration of children roller skating outdoors.

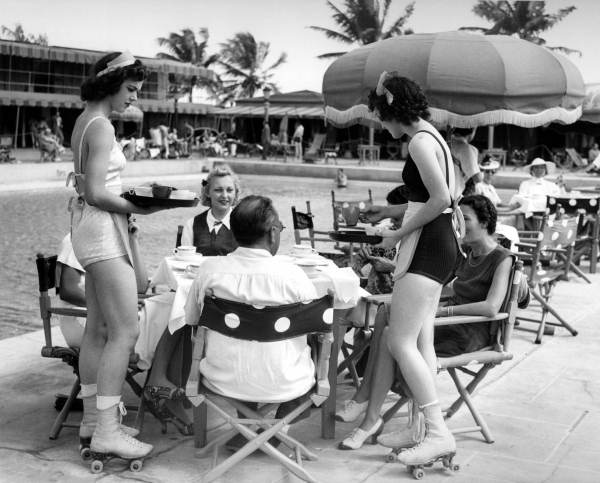
Roller skating waitresses at Roney Plaza Hotel, Miami Beach, Florida, 1939

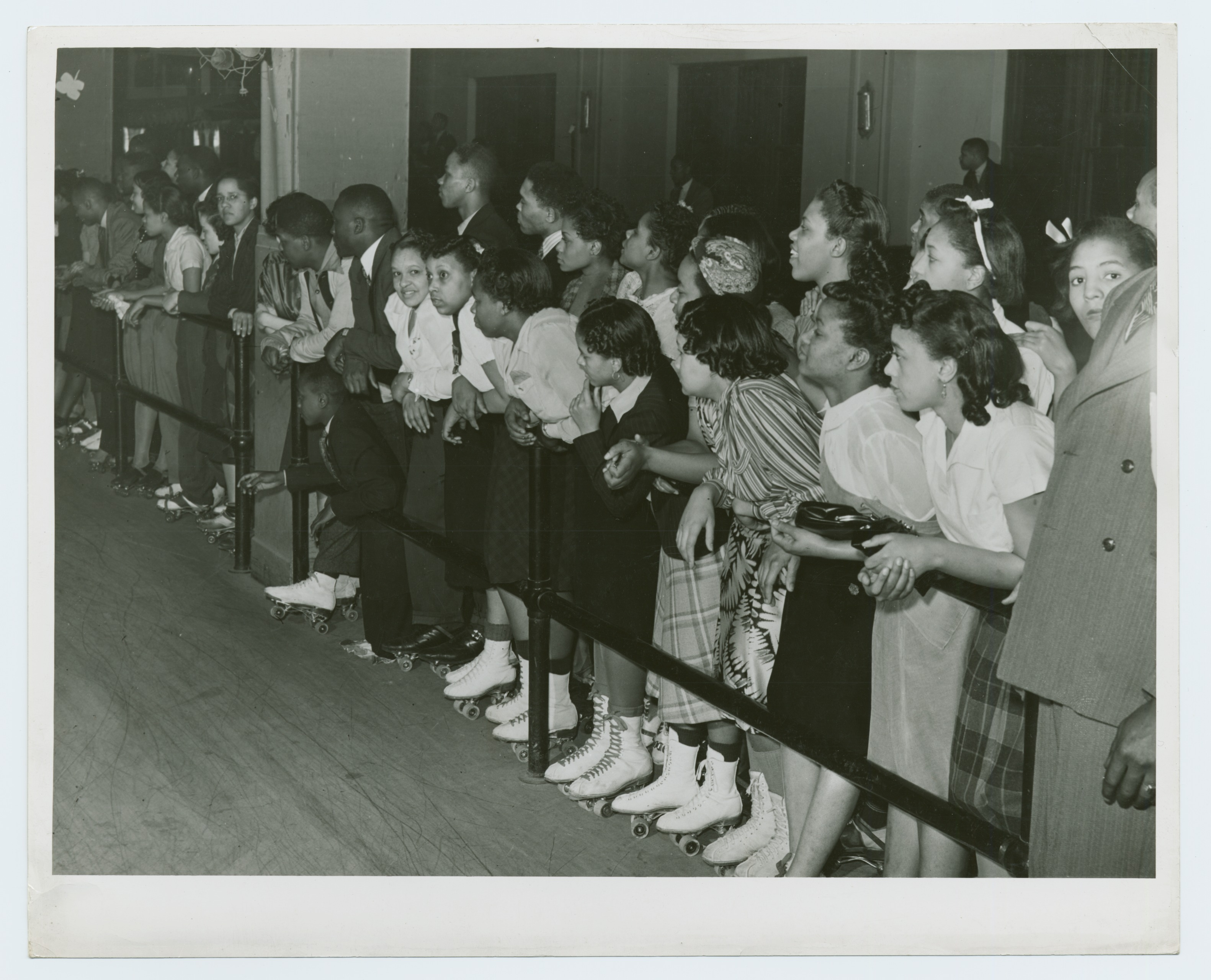
A crowd of roller skaters watch an exhibition in Chicago in 1939.

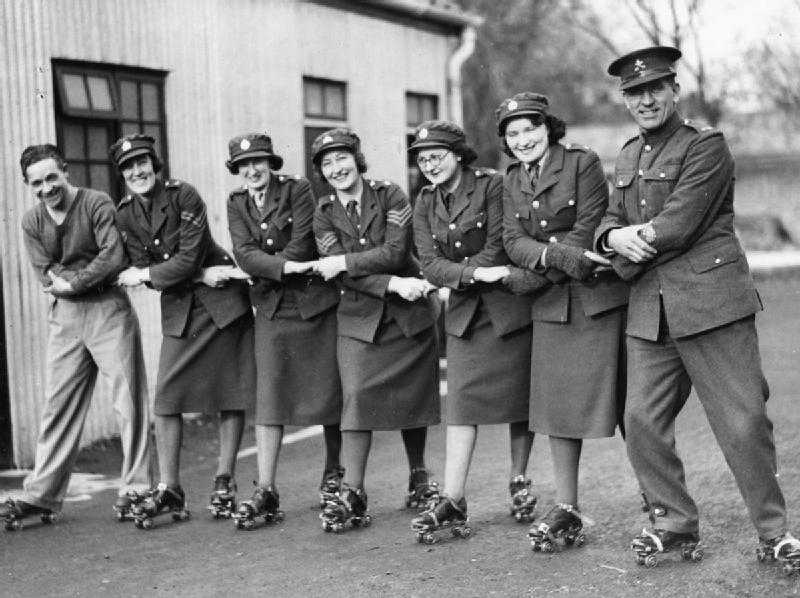
Members of the UK's Auxiliary Territorial Service take part in a rollerskating lesson, 1940.

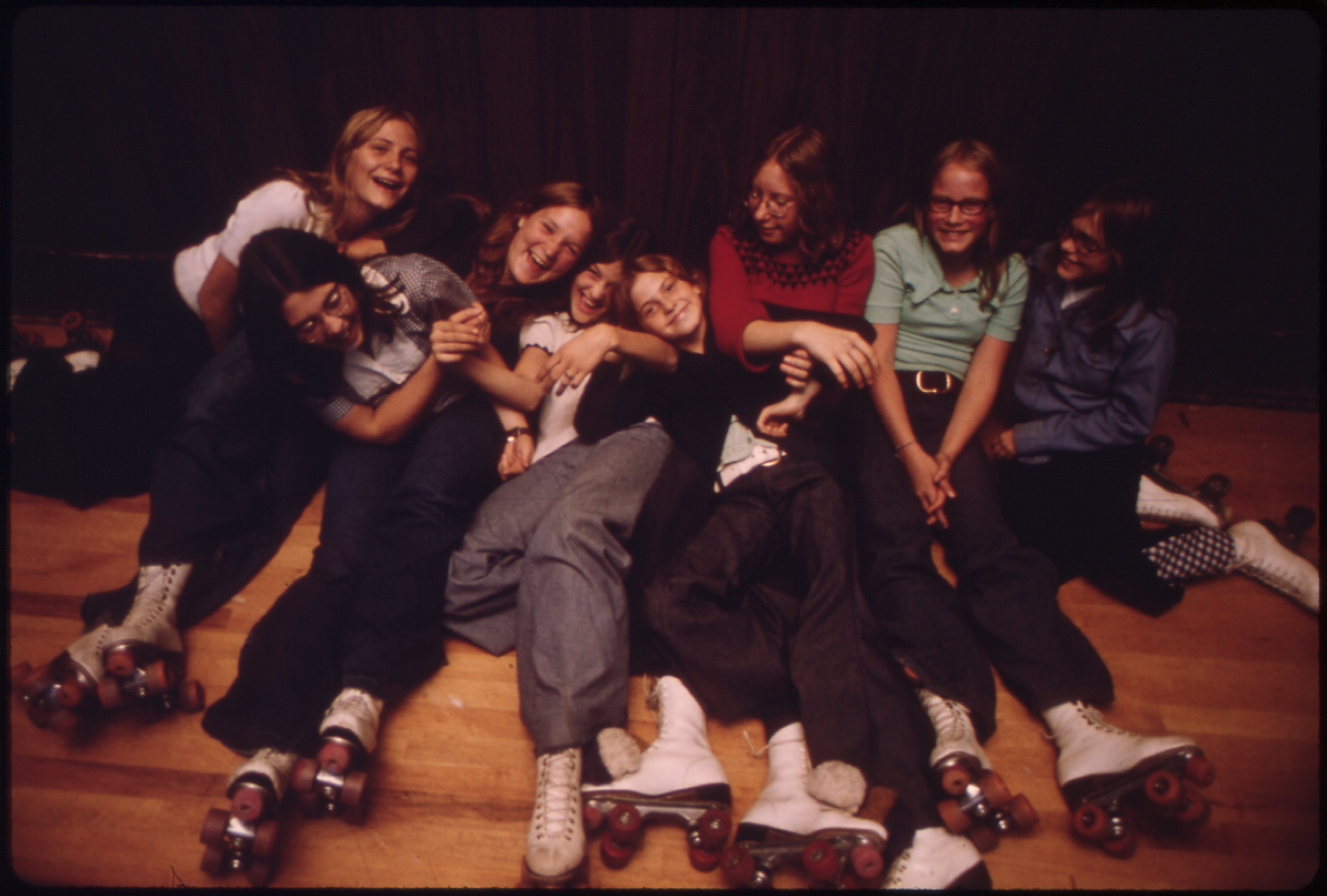
A group of teenagers pose at Izzy-Dorry's Roller Rink in New Ulm, Minnesota, 1974

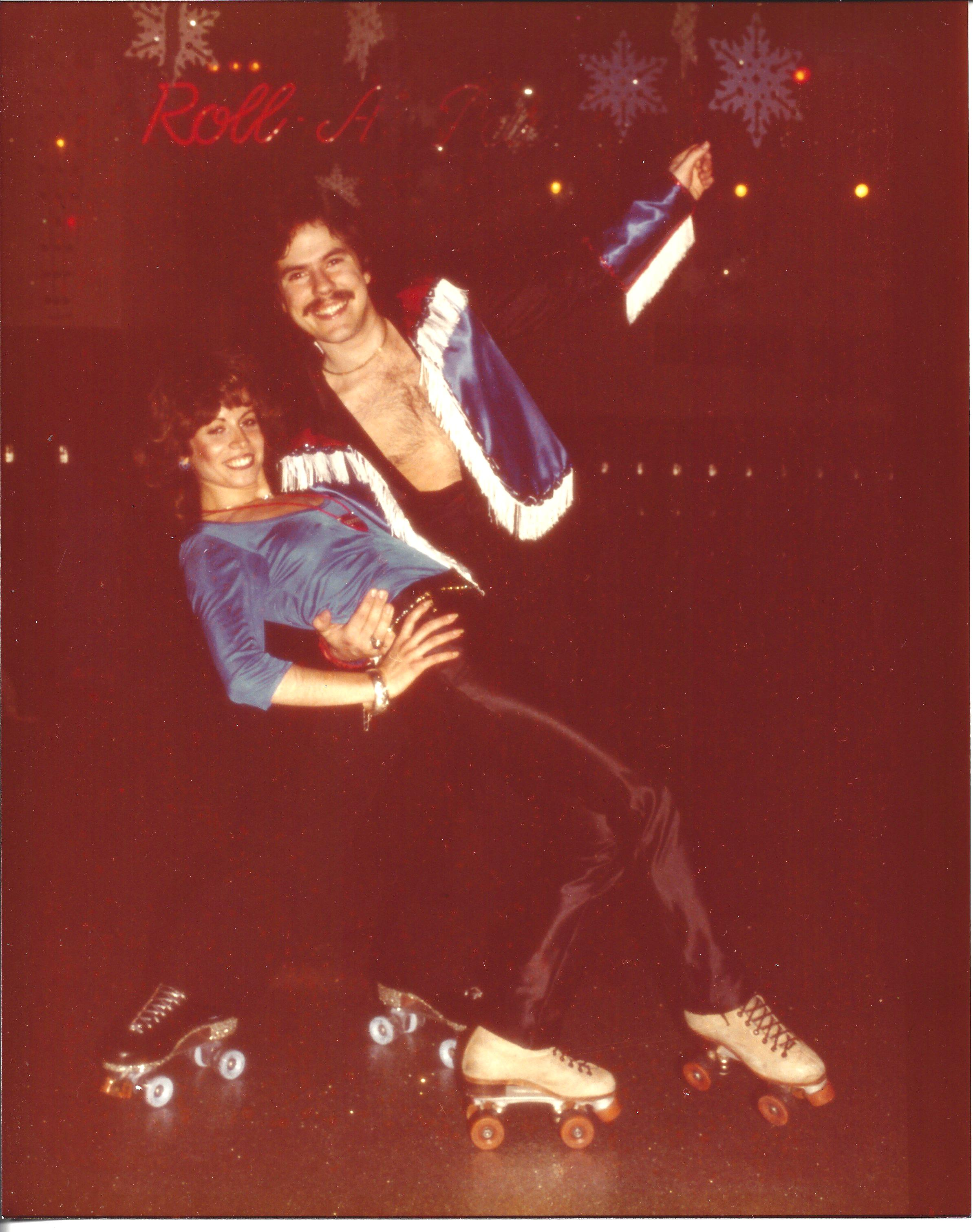
A roller disco couple at the Sheepshead Bay Roll-A-Palace in Brooklyn, New York, 1979

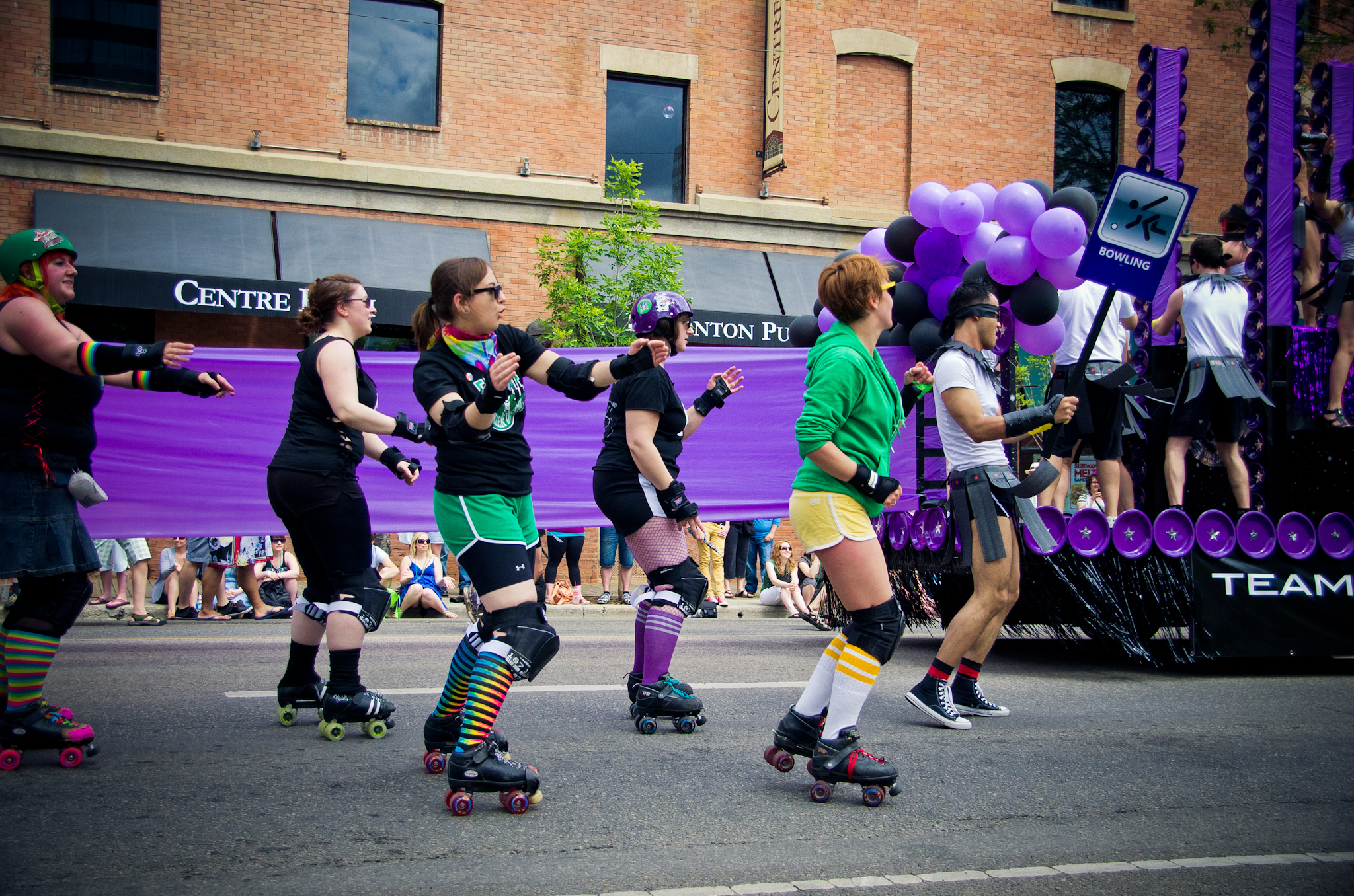
Rollerskaters dance in Canada's Edmonton Pride Parade, 2011

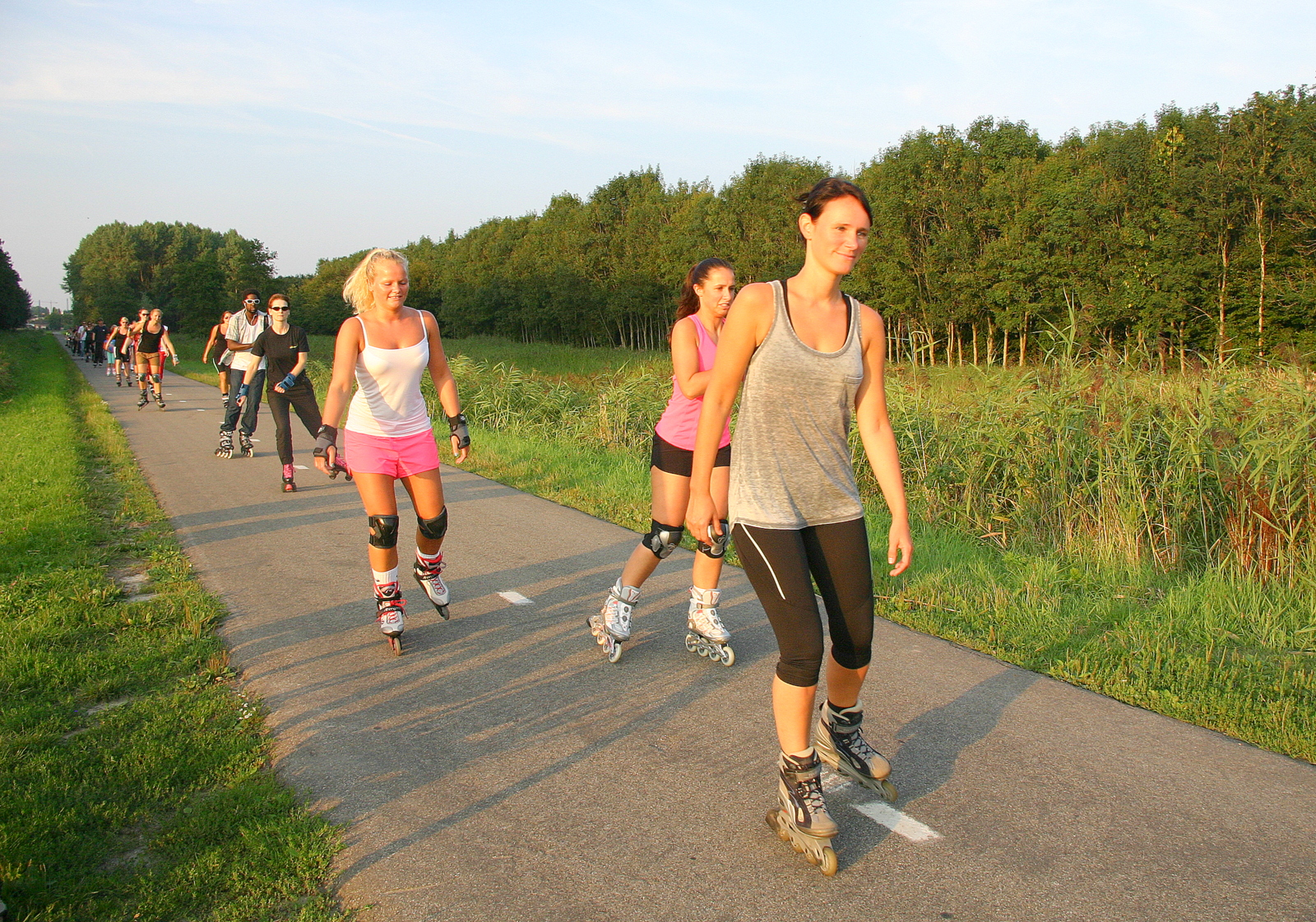
2013 skating group in Spijkenisse, Holland

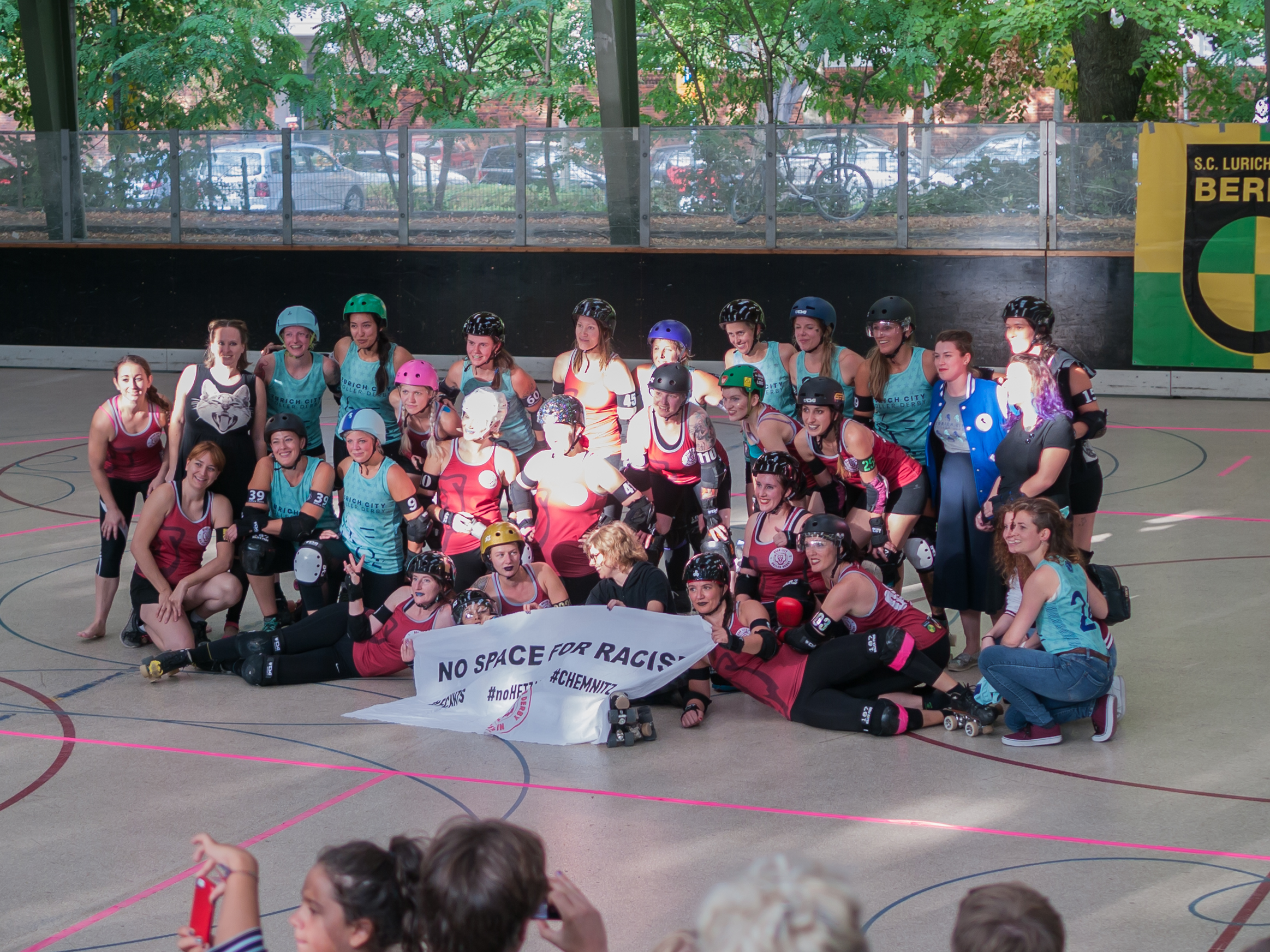
2018 roller derby competition between Zurich and Berlin in Berlin's at Fritz Schloß Park

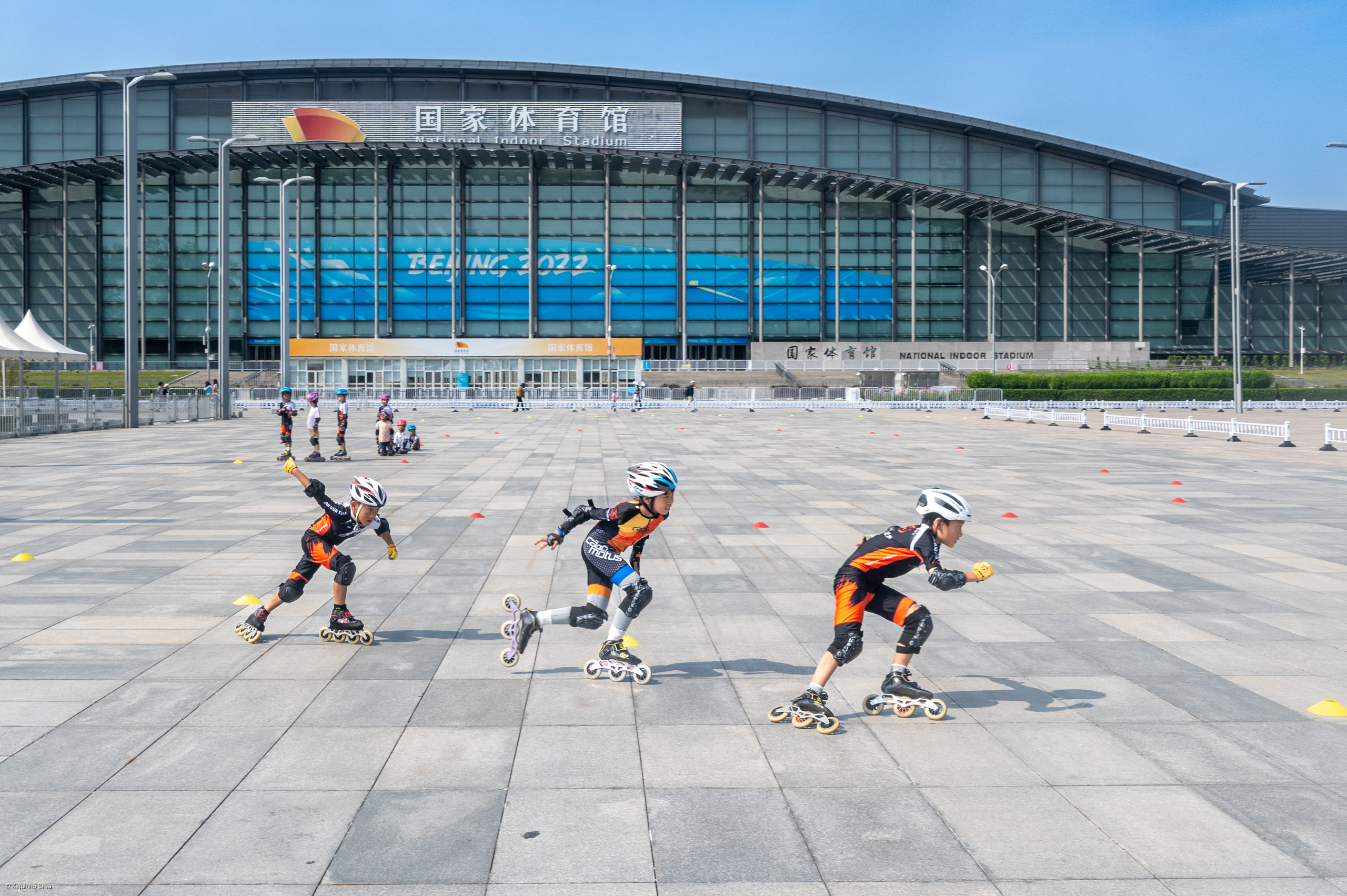
Child roller skaters in front of National Indoor Stadium in Beijing, China, 2024

"At the skating rink - Everyone is so nice + jolly here!" Early 20th century postcard image of a man helping a woman up from the ground while they are roller skating

== Types of roller skating ==
=== Artistic ===
Stopless quad skate plates

Artistic roller skating is a sport which consists of a number of events. These are usually accomplished on quad skates, but inline skates may be used for some events. Various flights of events are organized by age and ability/experience. In the US, local competitions lead to 9 regional competitions which led to the National Championships and World Championships.

- Figures: Figure artistic skating involves prescribed movement symmetrically composed of at least two circles, but not more than three circles, involving primary, or primary and secondary movements, with or without turns. Figures are skated on circles, which have been inscribed on the skating surface.
- Dance: Skaters are judged by the accuracy of steps that they skate when performing a particular dance. In addition to being judged on their edges and turns, skaters must carry themselves in an elegant manner while paying careful attention to the rhythm and timing of the music.
- Freestyle: Freestyle roller dancing is a style of physical movement, usually done to music, that is not choreographed or planned ahead of time. It occurs in many genres, including those where people dance with partners. By definition, this kind of dance is never the same from performance to performance, although it can be done formally and informally, sometimes using some sparse choreography as a very loose outline for the improvisation.
- Precision teams: A team of skaters (usually counted in multiples of four) creates various patterns and movements to music. Often used elements include skating in a line, skating in a box, "splicing" (subgroups skating towards each other such that they do not contact each other), and skating in a circle. The team is judged on its choreography and the ability to skate together precisely, and jumps and spins are not as important. In this category, they are classified as "small groups" (6 to 15 people) or "big groups" (16 to 30 skaters). These show groups are also divided due to the level and ages.
- Singles and pairs: A single skater or a pair of skaters present routines to music. They are judged on skating ability and creativity. Jumps, spins and turns are expected in these events. Sometimes with a pair or couple skaters slow music will play, and usually it is two songs.

=== Speed skating ===
Speed skating originally started on traditional roller skates, quads or four wheels per skate. The first organized, national competition was held in 1938 in Detroit Michigan at the Arena Gardens Roller Rink, once home of "Detroit's Premier Sports Palace. The Arena opened in 1935 as roller skating began its ascension as a top sport. In the early years, competitors representing the mid-west states, primarily Illinois, Indiana, Michigan and Ohio dominated the sport. By 1950 as rinks hired speed skating coaches who trained competitors, the east and west coast began to compete effectively for the national titles. But in the early years, national titles were dominated by Chicago, Detroit, Cleveland and Cincinnati.

As rules were established for state and national competitions, the speed skating season began in fall and continued through spring leading up to a state tournament. Eventually approximately 1947, due to the growth of speed skating, the top three places at a state tournament would qualify skaters for a regional tournament. The top three places at regional tournaments then went on to compete at a national tournament. Skaters could qualify as individuals or as part of a two-person or four-person (relay) team. Qualification at regional events could warrant an invite to the Olympic Training Center in Colorado Springs, CO for a one-week training session on their outdoor velodrome. Inline speed skating is a competitive non-contact sport on inline skates. Variants include indoor, track and road racing, with many different grades of skaters, so the whole family can compete.

=== Freestyle skating ===
==== Free jump ====
Skaters have several attempts to jump as high as possible over a bar. Similar to high jump.

==== Freestyle slide ====
Skaters compete in small groups of 3 to 4 and have several runs to outbid their opponents in technique. The best two go through to the next round. The ranking is made by direct comparison between the skaters.

==== Freestyle slalom skating ====
Inline freestyle slalom is a highly technical field of inline skating that involves performing tricks around a straight line of equally spaced cones. The three spacings used in competitions are 80 centimetres (31 in), 50 centimetres (20 in) and 120 centimetres (47 in).

=== Jam skating ===
Jam skating is a skating style consisting of a combination of dance, gymnastics, and roller skating, performed on roller skates. The 2018 documentary film United Skates prominently features the technique.

=== Urban skating ===
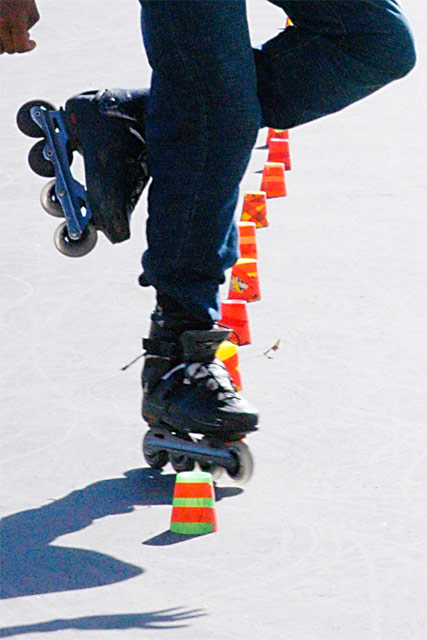
Inline roller skater on a slalom course

Among skaters not committed to a particular discipline, a popular social activity is the group skate or urban skating, in which large groups of skaters regularly meet to skate together, usually on city streets. One such group is the San Francisco Midnight Rollers. In 1989 the small 15–20 group that became the Midnight Rollers explored the closed doubIe-decker Embarcadero Freeway after the Loma-Prieta earthquake until it was torn down. At which point the new route was created settling on Friday nights at 9 pm from the San Francisco Ferry Building circling 12 miles around the city back at midnight to the start.

Although such touring existed among quad roller skate clubs in the 1970s and 1980s, it made the jump to inline skates in 1990 with groups in large cities throughout the United States. In some cases, hundreds of skaters would regularly participate, resembling a rolling party. In the late 1990s, the group skate phenomenon spread to Europe and east Asia. The weekly Friday night skate in Paris, France (called Pari Roller) is believed to be one of the largest repeating group skates in the world. At times, it has had as many as 35,000 skaters participating on the boulevards of Paris, on a single night.

The Sunday Skate Night in Berlin also attracts over 10,000 skaters during the summer, and Copenhagen, Munich, Frankfurt, Amsterdam, Buenos Aires, London, San Francisco, Los Angeles, New York, and Tokyo host other popular events. Charity skates in Paris have attracted 50,000 participants (the yearly Paris-Versailles skate). The current Official Guinness World Record holder is Nightskating Warszawa (Poland) in number of 4013 participants from 19 June 2014, but their real record from 25 April 2015, is 7303 participants and over 38 000 skaters total in 10 events in season 2015.

=== Aggressive inline ===
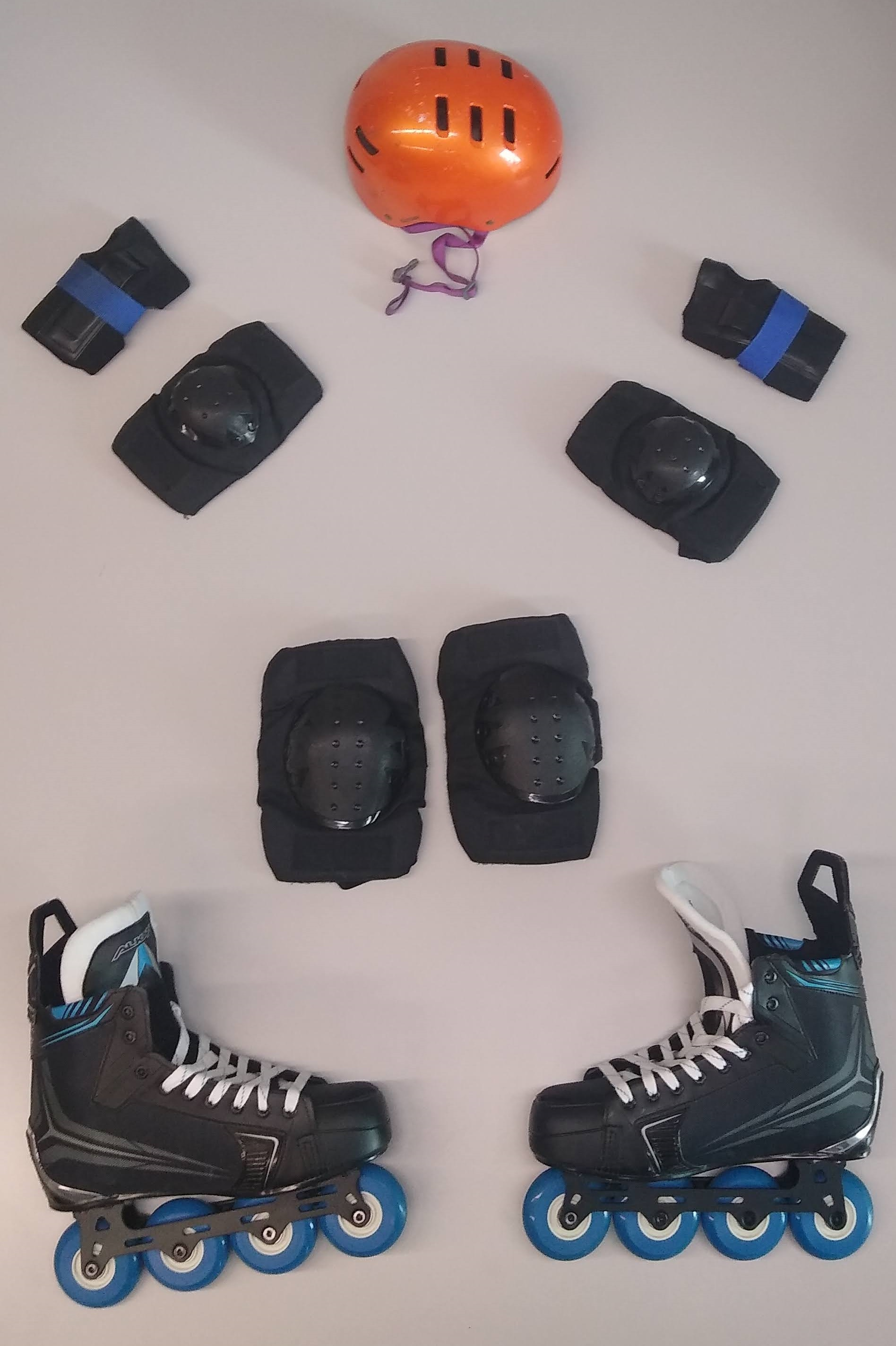
Typical In-line skating protective gear includes helmet, elbow pads, wrist guards, and knee pads.

This form of roller skating usually involves performing air tricks like spins or flips, grinds, and various types of stalls on the coping. Aggressive quad skating usually takes place on a street, or in a skate park on mini ramps, vert, and bowls.

Any roller skate can be used for park skating though many skaters prefer a higher-ankle boot over speed style boot. The boot of the skate may also be modified to withstand the higher impact that comes with this style of skating, whether it be at a park or on a street. Additional modifications to traditional rollers skates include the addition of a plastic block between the front and rear trucks commonly called slide blocks or grind blocks. The front and rear trucks can also be modified to use a 3-inch wide truck to allow for different tricks. Many skaters prefer small, hard wheels to allow more speed and less wheel bite.

=== Roller hockey ===
Roller hockey is the overarching name for variants of hockey played on quad or inline skates. Quad hockey (also called rink hockey, hardball hockey, or simply roller hockey) has been played since the 19th century. It is played in many countries worldwide and was a demonstration rollersport in the 1992 Summer Olympics in Barcelona. Other variations include inline hockey and inline skater hockey.

=== Roller derby ===
Roller derby is a team sport played on roller skates on an oval track. Originally a trademarked product developed out of speed skating demonstrations, the sport underwent a revival in the early 2000s as a grass-roots-driven, five-a-side sport played mainly by women. Most roller derby leagues adopt the rules and guidelines set by the Women's Flat Track Derby Association or its open gender counterpart, Men's Roller Derby Association, but there are leagues that play on a banked track, as the sport was originally played from the 1930s.

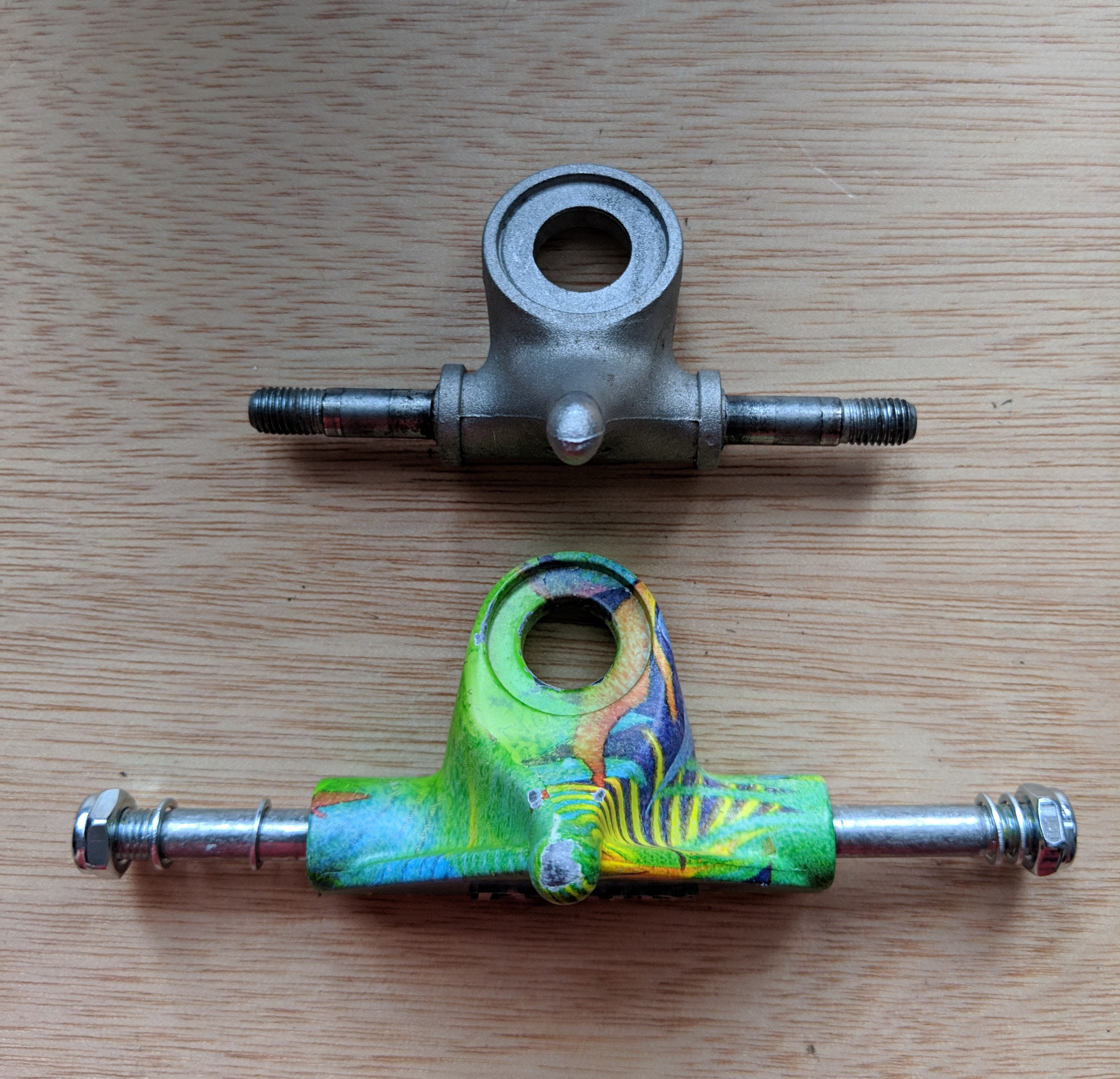
Standard roller skate (quad) trucks compared to 3-inch wide skate board (Penny) trucks (bottom).

== Skating federations ==
The Fédération Internationale de Patinage a Roulettes was founded in 1924, and in the 1960s it was renamed the Fédération Internationale de Roller Sports. In 2017 it merged with the International Skateboarding Federation to form the World Skate. It currently has over 130 national federations.

In the United States, the Roller Skating Rink Operators Association was founded in 1937 and the United States Amateur Roller Skating Association was founded in 1939. They merged in 1972 to form the USA Confederation of Roller Skating, later renamed USA Roller Sports. It is headquartered in Lincoln, Nebraska, also home of the National Museum of Roller Skating. Nationals are held each summer with skaters required to qualify through state and regional competitions.

== Alternatives ==
Roller skating, like skateboarding, has created a number of spin-off sports and sports devices. In addition to rollerblades/inline skates, there have also been:

- Soaps, normal-looking street/skate shoes with a concave plastic plate in the sole to allow grinds.
- Heelys, normal-looking street/skate shoes with a single retractable wheel in the heel of each shoe, allowing the wearer to perform unique rollerskating-like moves at leisure while still walking normally when the skating functionality isn't desired (and the wheel is mostly retracted into a recessed slot in the heel). The fact that skateboarding and related wheeled sports are outlawed in many cities and suburbs makes the low key and spontaneous nature of Heelys all the more enticing to the same demographic. Heelys were later also combined with Soaps into a single hybrid shoe.
- Freeline skates, a class of unattached skates that wearers place under their normal street or skate shoes. They typically have 2 closely set inline wheels set with a short base under a small squarish plate (usually surfaced with grip tape about the same width as the rider's shoe). This arrangement allows for a range of motion similar to single-wheeled skates like Heelys. Due to the lack of straps on the contact plate, freeline skates require constant motion to stay on, and are a particular challenge for novices.
- Two-wheeled skates: there are also other lesser seen two-wheeled skate arrangements. Some resemble inline skates but with 2 very large wheels bolted in at an angle from the outside rather than a center-balanced row of 4 smaller wheels underneath of inline skates. Others resemble freeline skates in that they have a small squarish platform, but with 2 medium-sized wheels on either side, somewhat between a freeline skate and roller skates (but with inline-skate-styled wheels).
- Orbit wheel skates, another spiritual relative of the freeline skate whereby the skate stands on a grip-tape-surfaced platform (just slightly larger than a freeline skate's) inside of a large hoop that contains a trapped wheel that can freely rotate under the grip plate each foot is planted on. The foot plates normally rest on the trough of the inner surface of these orbital wheels, with the toes pointing orthogonal to the rotation of the ringed wheel. It's said the experience of riding them is somewhat similar to skateboarding, and there are variants with the two wheels connected so the rider is fixed in a skateboarding-like stance.
- Razor Jetts Heel Wheels, a unattached heel wheel set up, uses hook and loop straps to keep your feet in place during use. In relation to freeline skates, the heel wheels can be unattached and reattached under any normal street shoe, skate shoe or gym shoe. Polyurethane wheels allow for a smooth ride when using the heel wheels. This type of activity is done outdoors on cement.

== See also ==
- Powerslide
- Road skating
- Sidesurf
