= Sidesurf =

Roller or inline skating style

Sidesurf is the term given to roller skaters or inline skaters who skate by placing their heels facing each other but separated by roughly shoulder width. In the sidesurf position, a straight line can be drawn through both heels and toes with the toes pointing away from each other. The motion is similar to being on a snow board however the toes are both turned outwards. Another term used for sidesurfing is "crabbing," as this is similar to the perpendicular style in which a crab moves.

Sidesurfing may be done while skating down hills, just like snowboarding, finding natural side hits because gravity naturally accelerates the skater. However, sidesurfers can learn to propel themselves forwards by rotating their hips from side to side while pushing their skates perpendicular to their direction of motion. It is also used in a variety of other roller skating sports, ranging from roller derby to vertical (aggressive and park) skating. Initially, sidesurfing is quite hard and a lot of practice is required, starting with groin stretches.

A more advanced version of the sidesurf is called the Sidesurf Royale also known as the Heel-heel side Surf. This is a modification of the sidesurf move where the blader sidesurfs with his or her toes off the ground.

There are claims that sidesurf stance was used for slalom cone skating in the early 70's, and that Kenny Means was the first to popularize the style of skating.
