= Golden age of roller skating =

Period in American history (1937–1959)

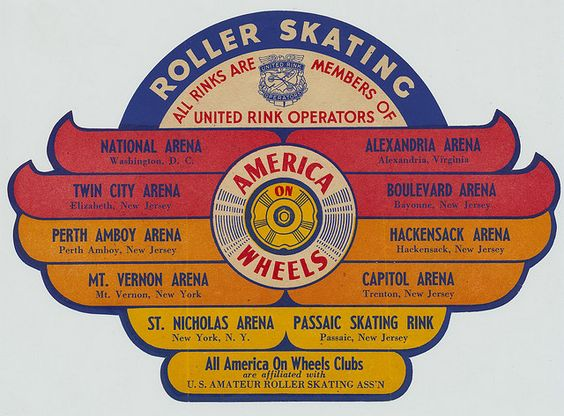
Logo sticker of the America on Wheels chain of roller skating rinks that managed rinks from 1941 well into the 1970s.

The golden age of roller skating, from approximately 1937–1959, represents a period when roller skating was the number one participatory sport in America.

== Background ==
Civilians, war industry workers and military personnel, both in the states and overseas, sought out roller skating rinks to relieve the stress of war during World War II, propelling roller skating to the top sport by the end of the 1940s. An estimated 5,000 rinks were in operation and 18,000,000 Americans roller skated during the peak of the trend. The Midwest, particularly Chicago, was thought to be the epicenter of the hobby.

The establishment of the Roller Skating Rink Owners Association (RSROA) in 1937, an organization of rink owners collaborating to organize national competition, is credited with initiating the onset of the Golden Age. The reputation of roller skating was transformed into a sport for all adults to enjoy as recreation. In 1938, dancing on roller skates became popular and spread from the east to the west coast. National competitions were established for speed skating, skate dancing, and figure skating. By 1941, conventions were being held across the country in the nation’s newest and best-equipped rinks. As the United States entered World War II, the national organization of skaters was well structured to become the leisure recreation sought by both youth and adults. Rinks were able to organize locally, hosting recycle drives.

A rival organization to the RSROA was established on the east coast and called United Rink Owners (URO). In cooperation with the Amateur Athletic Union, the URO established the Amateur Roller Skating Association. For over thirty years, two separate national organizations existed until they decided to unite as USA Roller Sports in 1971. As a result of the division, prior to their merger, roller skating was represented by two national champions for each of its formal competition divisions.

Once national organizations were established to oversee competitions rules, state organizations soon followed. One of the most innovative organizational structures was America on Wheels (AOW). First established in 1941 and operating well into the 1970s, AOW rinks were members of the United Rink Owners association. AOW was a chain of east coast rinks, primarily in New York and New Jersey, that readied competitors through training and regular meets among a group of rinks. At AOW's peak, they numbered 22. The organization managed the rinks while a group of investors sought venues to invest, and in the 1940s, rinks were built in geographic regions that held promise for economic growth. Over time, as both insurance liability costs and real estate values rose, rinks were sold off for better investment opportunities.
