= Fanny Davidson =

American figure skater

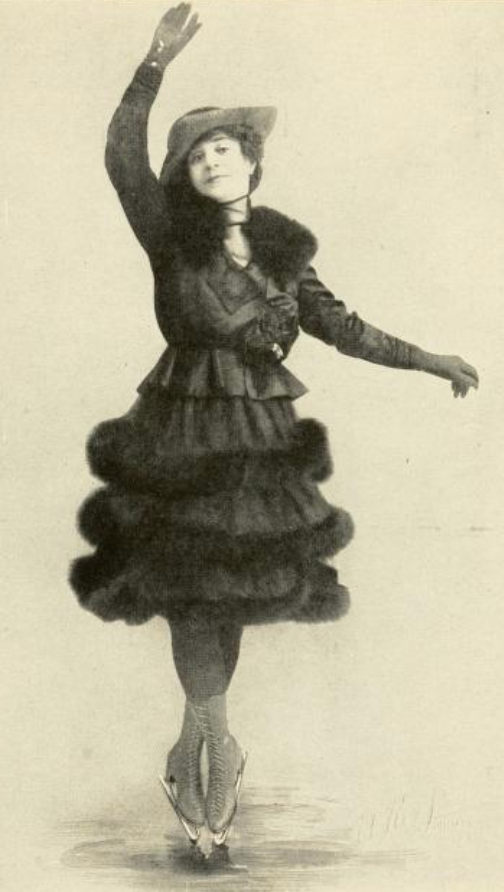
- Fanny Davidson, from a 1921 publication
- Born: Frances Lucretia Davidson; April 4, 1866; Minnesota, U.S.
- Died: May 22, 1940 (aged 74); New York, U.S.
- Other names: Fannie Davidson, Fannie Noble
- Occupation: Figure skater
- Relatives: Harley Davidson (brother)

Frances "Fanny" Lucretia Davidson Noble (April 4, 1866 (Note: Davidson's date of birth varies in sources. She was recorded as a four-year-old in her parents' household in the 1870 United States census. The 1880 United States census gives her birth year as 1866; her New York death certificate gives 1871 as her birth year; the 1900 United States census has her birth year as 1872, and her date of marriage as 1886; the Minnesota Marriage Index gives her marriage date as October 22, 1884; all via Ancestry.) – May 22, 1940) was an American figure skater from Minnesota, described as "the champion lady skater of North America". She toured the United States, Canada, and Europe in the 1890s, 1900s, and 1910s.

== Early life and education ==
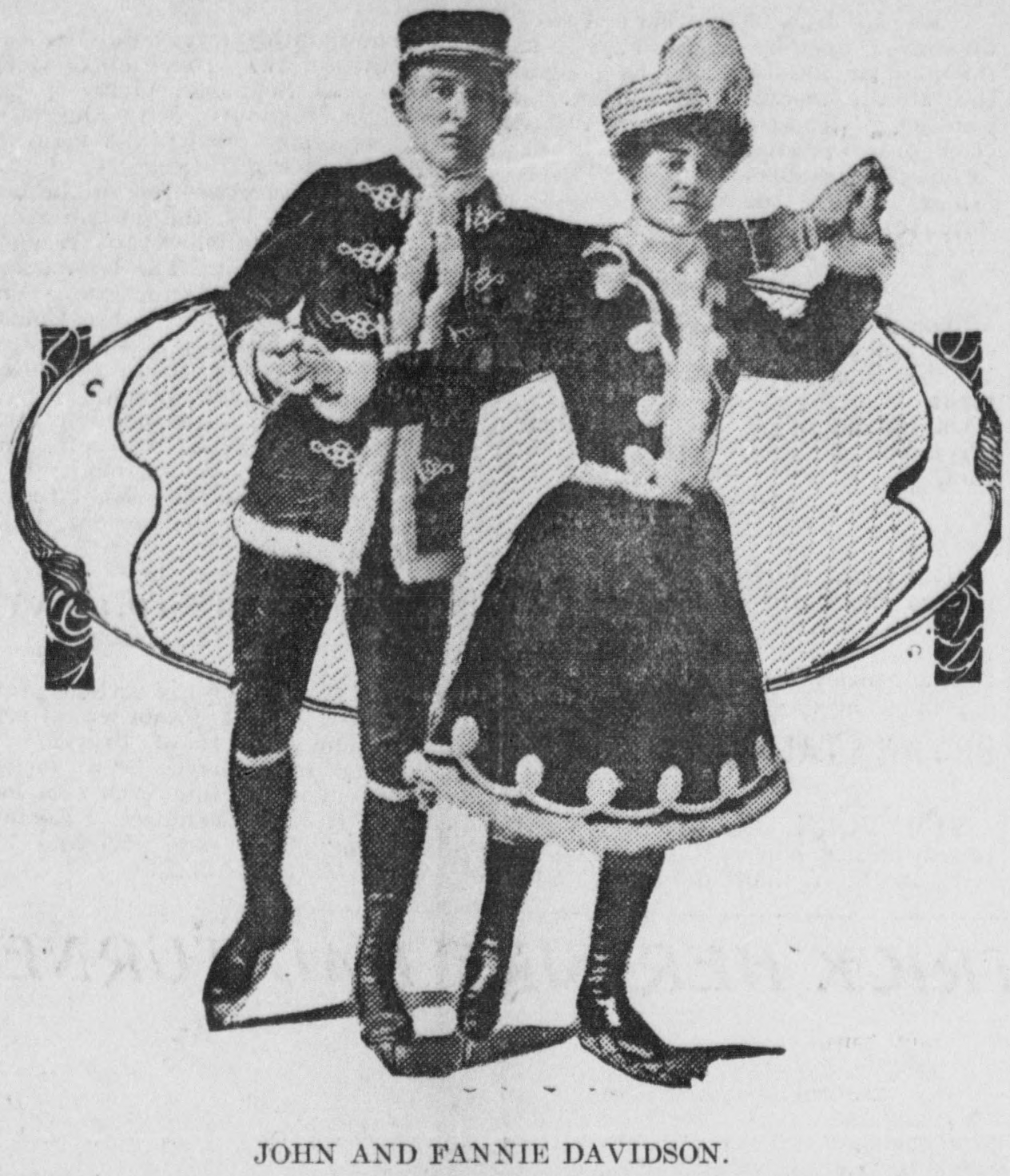
John and Fannie Davidson in 1904

Davidson was from Saint Paul, Minnesota, the daughter of John X. Davidson and Susan Havens Lamb Davidson. Her father was a newspaper editor and a state legislator. She and her siblings, Harley Davidson, Mabel, and John, learned to skate as children, and became noted skaters. Another brother, Albert, became a musical comedy star.

== Career ==
Davidson taught at St. Nicholas Rink in New York and at the Winter Club of Montreal. She toured the United States, Canada, and Europe giving exhibitions with her brother John, including an appearance at the International Skating Competition in Westminster in 1900. She also gave skating exhibitions with Irving Brokaw.

== Personal life ==
Davidson married William Noble in 1884 and raised two children, William and Martha. She died in 1940, in New York City, in her seventies.
