= Fred Murree =

Pawnee professional roller skater

- Bright Star in 1939

Personal information
- Native name: Bright Star
- Full name: Fred Brightstar Murree
- Nationality: Pawnee, American
- Born: October 7, 1861 Pawnee territory / Nebraska Territory
- Died: March 6, 1950 (aged 88) Philadelphia, Pennsylvania, U.S.
- Spouse: Francis Alice Clews

Sport
- Sport: roller speed skating, artistic roller skating
- Turned pro: 1879
- Retired: 1948

Fred Murree (October 7, 1861 – March 6, 1950), also known as Bright Star, was a Pawnee professional roller skater. He has been called "the fastest man on wheels" of the early roller skating era.

Born in Nebraska Territory, he and his family were exiled by the US government and fled to Boston, where Bright Star became a champion roller speed skater during the skating boom of 1880–1910. Later Bright Star became known for artistic roller skating, known in his time as "fancy skating", using native themes in his performance.

== Early life ==
Fred Murree was born in a Pawnee village near Omaha, Nebraska, on October 7, 1861. He had two brothers and one sister. His mother died when he was five. The United States government forcibly relocated the Pawnee to Indian Territory (modern-day Oklahoma) in the mid-1870s. Rather than submit to the forced relocation, Bright Star's father moved his family east to Massachusetts. Walking and traveling by pony, the family reached Boston after three months of travel.

According to Murree's account of his own life, he enrolled in public school in Boston and found that he constantly had to fight other students who attacked him because of his race and his long, braided hair. After three weeks he left school and got a job fitting skates onto customers of a roller rink. While working at the rink, he commissioned custom Plimpton brand roller skates with pin bearing wheels and began to train as a speed skater.

== Roller skating career ==
=== Speed skating ===
Murree was 17 when he entered his first race, a five-mile competition in Boston. Kenneth Skinner, the fastest speed skater of the Boston area and the five-mile record holder, was expected to win the race. Murree won the race in 15 minutes and 52 seconds, beating Skinner and cutting eight seconds from Skinner's previous record time.

Roller skating was booming in popularity in the US in the early 1880s; technology and performance were improving quickly. The sport was not yet standardized, and record times from the era are hard to determine with certainty. The Complete Book of Roller Skating (1979) lists Murree's time in this race to be the world speed record at the time.

Following his win against Skinner, the crowd of spectators carried Murree away on their shoulders and celebrated with him into the early morning hours. A rink manager named Frank Clayton read of the race in Boston newspapers and approached Murree's father with a contract binding Murree to Clayton's rink until the age of 21 in exchange for one thousand dollars. Murree skated 284 winning five-mile races for Clayton.

Murree wrote that his previous rival Kenneth Skinner invented the first ball bearing skates in 1880 and gave Murree the second pair produced. The new skates allowed Murree to improve his record — according to Billboard magazine, Murree became the first person to skate 5 miles in 15 minutes.

When he was 20, Murree attempted to escape his contract with Clayton. He returned to work when Clayton offered to pay him directly. Clayton never paid Murree's father for the contract. The contract ended when Murree was 21, and he began to compete in open races.

During the panic of 1884 the American boom in roller skating declined, and Murree accepted an offer from a skate manufacturer to travel to Australia. When he got to England, he decided to re-route to tour Europe instead. He skated at exhibitions in England, France, Italy, and Germany while skating was popular there, earning over ten thousand dollars. He moved on to Argentina and Brazil when the popularity of skating spread to South America.

After his international travel, Murree returned to the eastern United States. In 1910 he raced John Clark, a prominent skater in Minneapolis. In 1911 he raced Fred Googins, skating champion of Maine. He met his wife, a British woman named Francis Alice Clews, at a roller rink in Boston. They made their home together in Red Lion, Pennsylvania. Murree served in the First World War and returned to skating after his military service. His racing career ended when he was injured during a race in Reading, Pennsylvania. He continued his fancy skating career.

=== Fancy skating ===
For his artistic roller skating or "fancy skating" performances, Murree performed in Plains Indian-style clothes, accompanied both by native music and popular music of the time. A skating instructor in Detroit described Murree's act as consisting of intricate movements of four-leaf clovers, grape vines, spirals, and spread eagles. Murree showed off his smooth balance by picking up objects with his teeth.

Murree wore a feathered headdress made by Chief White Horn, a self-claimed alias of Levi Levering. From the Omaha nation, Levering was forcibly immersed in white culture at the Carlisle Indian Industrial School. The headdresses he made combine costume-like and traditional elements.

The public in the US and in Europe during the era of Murree's career were fascinated by American Indians because of movies and popular stories. Murree declined offers to take his skating onto the vaudeville stage. He believed that his work should stay in roller rinks to be respected. He also managed roller skating rinks in various parts of the US.

Requests for his skating exhibitions did not stop as Murree became elderly. His last performances were in Detroit, which was a center of American roller skating following World War II. At the age of 81 Murree reported: "[I] am getting as much work as I can take care of and I am in good form."

== Retirement ==
Murree retired in 1948 after more than 60 years of prominence as a professional roller skater. He was still receiving requests to book roller skating exhibitions, but he could not fulfill them because of arthritis and failing eyesight. Toward the end of his career, he said, "I have enjoyed a full and useful life on skates".

Murree died in 1950 and was buried at Beverly National Cemetery.

== Legacy ==
Bright Star is considered the first great speed skater in reference works about roller skating, such as The History of Roller Skating by James Turner and Michael Zaidman.
