= Kenneth Skinner =

Champion roller speed skater from the late nineteenth century

Kenneth A. Skinner
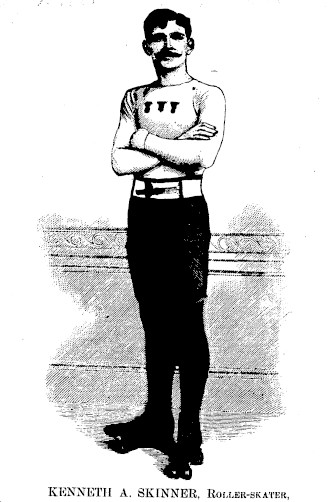

Personal information
- Nationality: Canadian
- Born: 1861 Nova Scotia
- Died: July 25, 1932 (aged 70–71) Norfolk, Massachusetts
- Height: 5 ft 9.5 in (177 cm)
- Weight: 140 lb (64 kg)
- Spouse: Adelaide Cushman

Sport
- Sport: roller speed skating

Kenneth A. Skinner (1861 – 25 July 1932) was a champion roller speed skater in the late nineteenth century.

== Life ==
Skinner was born in 1861 in Nova Scotia and came to the United States at the age of 17. He married actress Adelaide Cushman in 1888. He died at Pondville State Hospital in Massachusetts in 1932.

== Career ==
Skinner was considered the American champion speed skater in 1884, although this was before the sport was standardized by any governing body so definitive championships are hard to determine.

According to fellow skater Bright Star, Skinner was the inventor of ball bearing wheeled skates.

Skinner sometimes competed on skates against opponents on bicycles. Skinner lost these races, but not by much. Bicycles of the time were primitive.

According to the New York Clipper, Skinner "throws forward his chest in a most remarkable manner" while skating.

=== Races won ===
Length	Time	Date	Location	Opponent(s)	Notes
2 miles	8:29.75	20 May 1883	Boston	O'Rourke, Alliston	New England championship
2 miles	8:04			F.G. Stumcke, A.F. Rivard	
1 mile	4:15.75		Boston	Bert C. Thayer	
5 miles	22:29.75	December 8, 1883	Boston	B.L. Bailey	
20 miles	1:35:7	January 22, 1884	Haverhill	Ladd	American championship
5 miles	21:37		Haverhill	Nate E. Clark	
4 miles	17:36	March 6, 1884	Lynn	Nate E. Clark	
5 miles	20:9.25	March 7, 1884	Boston	Nate E. Clark	

Source: Roller skating made easy, 1884
