= Harley Davidson (skater) =

American athlete (1873–1946)

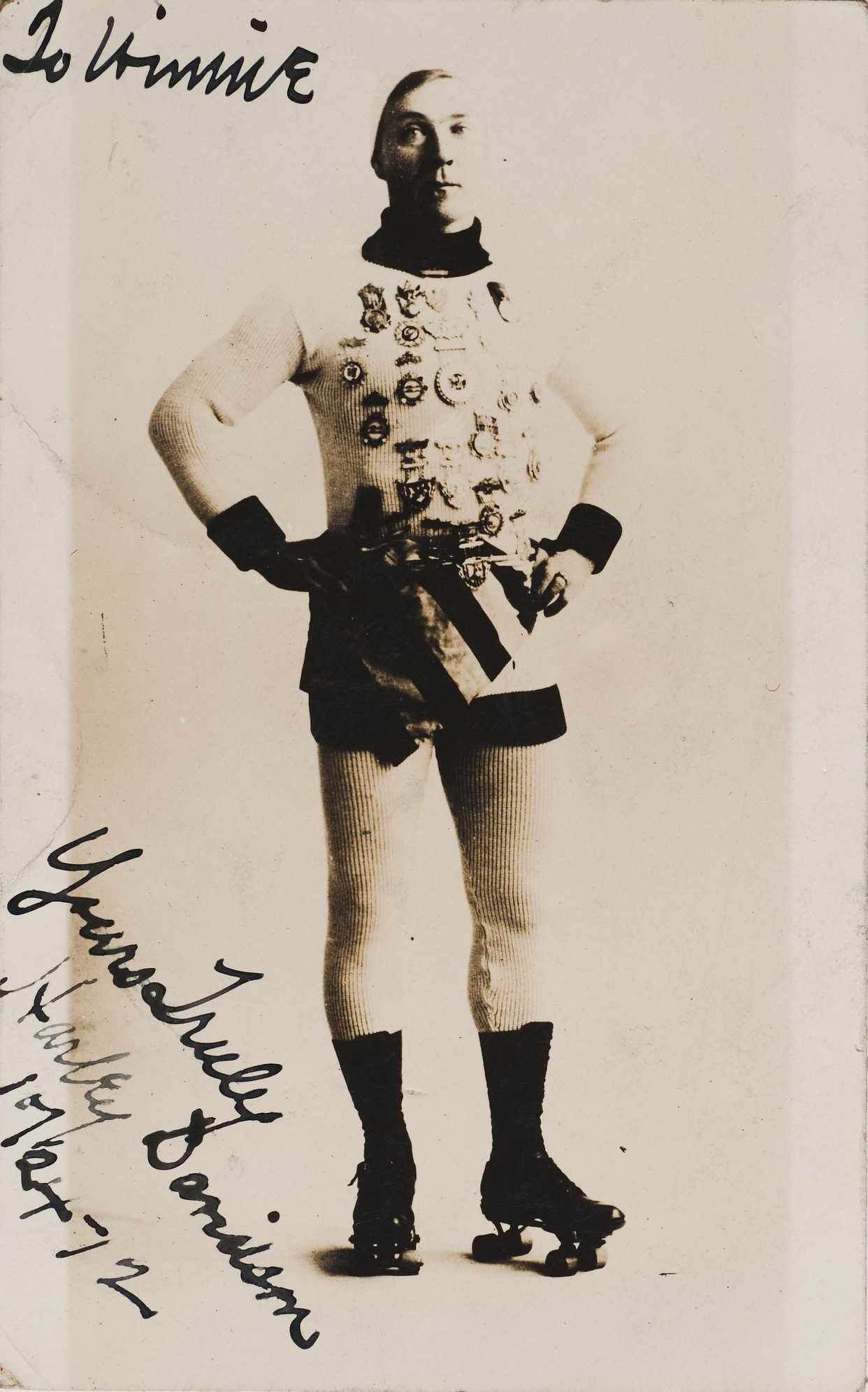
- Portrait of speed skater Harley Davidson, 1912

Personal information
- Born: 1873
- Died: March 10, 1946 Saint Paul, Minnesota, U.S.
- Relative: Fanny Davidson (sister)

Sport
- Country: United States
- Sport: roller speed skating, ice speed skating, artistic roller skating
- Turned pro: 1892

Harley Davidson (1873–1946) was an American athlete, famous as a roller speed skater. He was also an ice speed skater, cyclist, and competed in other exhibition sports in the early 20th Century. Skaters competing across multiple sports was common then.

His name has no connection to the Harley-Davidson brand of motorcycles. Though, in 1912 he made a promotional appearance at the Harley-Davidson factory in Milwaukee.

== Biography ==
Davidson was born to a family of talented roller and ice skaters. His sisters Mabel and Fanny Davidson, and their brother Johnny, were also professional skaters.

Harley Davidson started competitive skating on ice around 1892. He defeated Joe Donoghue in ice speed skating on the Hudson River. Davidson began to roller skate professionally in 1905.

In the 1909 World Professional Championships held at Olympia Rink in London, Davidson was among the 150 skaters who competed. He was among the five finalists who raced on February 26, drawing 14,000 spectators. For winning the championship, Davidson was awarded a diamond-studded medal and a first prize purse of $2,000 in gold. His time, 2 minutes and 51 seconds for a 1-mile race, is considered a world record at that time by The Complete Book of Roller Skating. Though, because the sport was not yet centrally regulated, definitive records for the era are hard to determine. Later that year he was special guest at the opening of the Royal Dublin Society skating rink in Dublin.

From 1909 to 1911, Harley Davidson raced in challenge matches in America, Canada, and Europe against the best speed skaters of his time. In 1911 he established a professional skating troupe. He won three races on one day, January 5, 1912, in Grand Rapids, Michigan. He skated a three-mile race in 9:15, one mile in 3:05, and two miles in 6:10.

Davidson gradually retired from roller speed skating beginning in 1916, switching to "fancy skating" and dance exhibitions. Unlike other speed skaters, he did not have a roller rink management job to fall back on, so times proved hard for him financially. Though he had no relation to the increasingly-popular Harley-Davidson motorcycles, as his own fame diminished, he sometimes pretended that he did. He died in 1946 because of injuries suffered in an automobile accident.
