= Hélder Nunes =

Portuguese roller hockey player

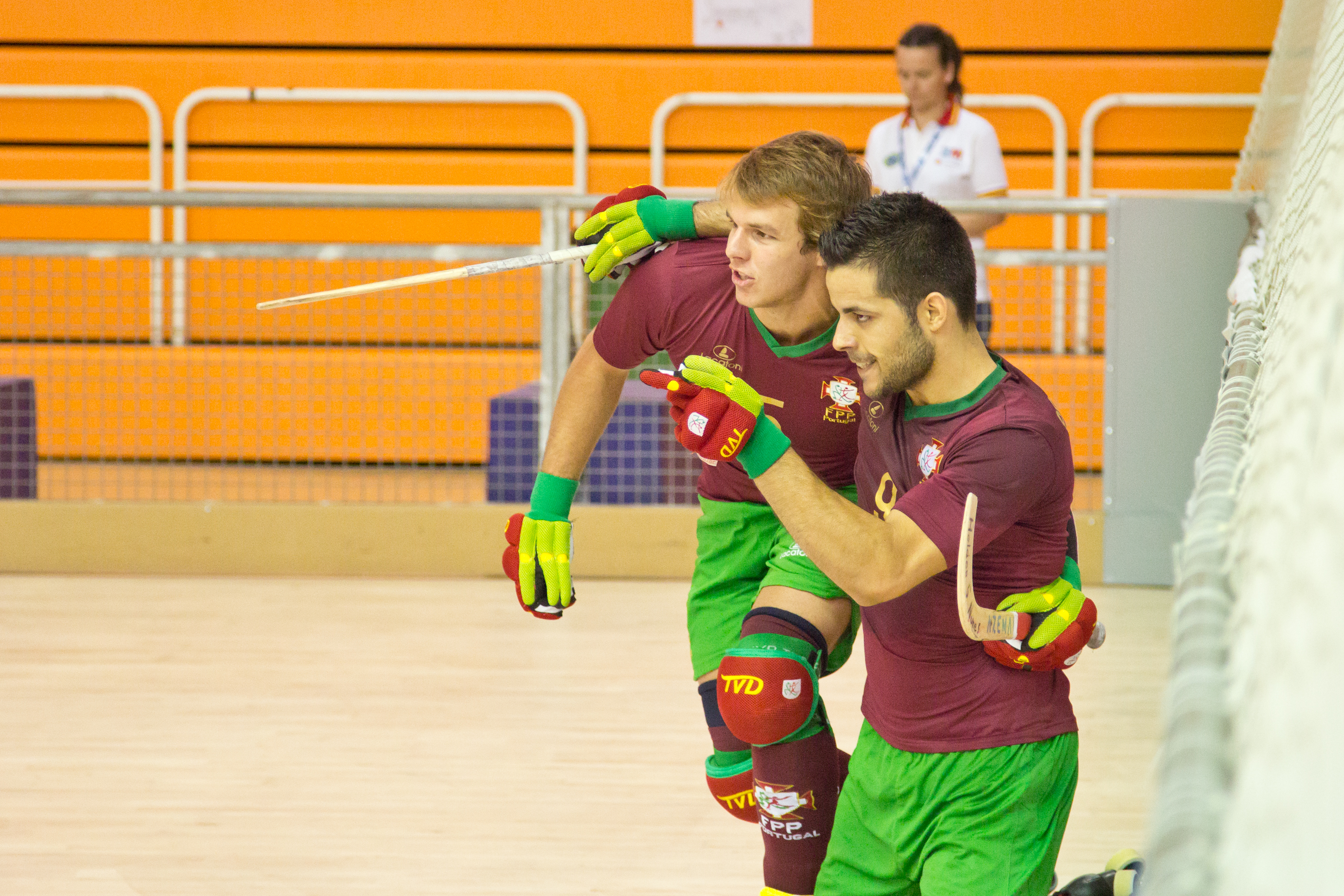
- Nunes (left) together with João Rodrigues at the 2014 European Championship

Personal information
- Full name: Hélder Pereira Nunes
- Nationality: Portuguese
- Born: 23 February 1994 (age 32) Barcelos, Portugal
- Years active: 2010–
- Height: 1.77 m (5 ft 9 1/2 in)
- Weight: 76 kg (168 lb)

Sport
- Country: Portugal
- Sport: Roller hockey
- Team: HC Braga (2010–2012); FC Porto (2012–2019); FC Barcelona (2019–2023); FC Porto (2023-)
Medal record
Representing Portugal
World Cup
Winner	Barcelona 2019
Runner-up	Nanjing 2017
European Championship
Winner	Oliveira de Azeméis 2016
Runner-up	Paredes 2012
Runner-up	La Coruña 2018
Nations Cup
Winner	Nations Cup 2013
Winner	Nations Cup 2015
Winner	Nations Cup 2019
Runner-up	Nations Cup 2017
Latin Cup
Winner	Viana do Castelo 2014
Winner	Follonica 2016
Runner-up	Vilanova i la Geltrú 2012
U20 World Cup
Winner	Cartagena 2013
Runner-up	Barcelos 2011
European U20 Championship
Winner	Saint-Omer 2012
European U17 Championship
Winner	Dinan 2009
Runner-up	Northampton 2010

Hélder Nunes (born 23 February 1994) is a Portuguese roller hockey player who currently plays for FC Porto and the Portugal national roller hockey team.

== Honours ==
=== Club ===
Porto

- Portuguese Championship: 2012–13, 2016–17, 2018–19
- Portuguese Cup: 2012–13, 2015–16, 2016–17, 2017–18
- Portuguese Supercup: 2013, 2016, 2017, 2018

Barcelona

- Catalan League: 2019–20

=== International ===
Portugal

- Roller Hockey World Cup: 2019
- Roller Hockey European Championship: 2016
- Roller Hockey Nations Cup: 2013, 2015, 2019
- Roller Hockey Latin Cup: 2014, 2016
- Roller Hockey U20 World Cup: 2013
- Roller Hockey U20 European Championship: 2012
- Roller Hockey U17 European Championship: 2009

=== Orders ===
- Grand Cross of the Order of Merit
- Commander of the Order of Merit
