= 2014 in sports =

2014 in sports describes the year's events in world sport.

== Calendar by month ==
=== January ===
Date	Sport	Venue/Event	Status	Winner/s
26 Dec. 2013–5	Ice hockey	(Sweden) 2014 World Junior Ice Hockey Championships	International	Finland; MVP: (Sweden) Filip Forsberg
28 Dec. 2013–5	Cross-country skiing	(Italy) / (Germany) / (Switzerland) 2013–14 Tour de Ski	International	Men: (Norway) Martin Sundby; Women: (Norway) Therese Johaug
29 Dec. 2013–6	Ski jumping	(Austria) / (Germany) 2013–14 Four Hills Tournament	International	(Austria) Thomas Diethart
1	Ice hockey	(United States) 2014 NHL Winter Classic	Domestic	(Ontario) Toronto Maple Leafs
3–8 November	Motorsport	(European Union) 2014 European Rally Championship season	Continental	ERC Driver's overall winner: (Finland) Esapekka Lappi; ERC Co-driver's overall winner: (Finland) Janne Ferm; 2WD Driver's overall winner: (Hungary) Zoltán Bessenyey; 2WD Co-driver's overall winner: (Hungary) Yulianna Nyirfàs; Production Cup Driver's overall winner: (Ukraine) Vitaliy Pushkar; Production Cup Co-driver's overall winner: (Ukraine) Ivan Mishyn; ERC's Junior driver overall winner: (France) Stéphane Lefebvre; Ladies' trophy winner: (Bulgaria) Ekaterina Stratieva; Ice Masters winner: (Poland) Robert Kubica; Gravel Masters winner: (Poland) Kajetan Kajetanowicz; Asphalt Masters winner: (Finland) Esapekka Lappi
4–12	Darts	(United Kingdom) 2014 BDO World Darts Championship	International	Men: (England) Stephen Bunting; Women: (England) Lisa Ashton
5–18	Rally	(Argentina) / (Bolivia) / (Chile) 2014 Dakar Rally	International	Bikes: (Spain) Marc Coma ( (Austria) KTM); Quads: (Chile) Ignacio Casale ( (Japan) Yamaha); Cars: (Spain) Nani Roma / (France) Michel Périn ( (United Kingdom) Mini); Trucks: (Russia) Andrey Karginov / Andrey Mokeev / Igor Devyatkin ( (Russia) Kamaz)
6	American football	(United States) 2014 BCS National Championship Game	Domestic	Florida State; MVPs: (Alabama) Jameis Winston and P. J. Williams (both from Florida State)
10–18	Field hockey	(India) 2012–13 Men's FIH Hockey World League Final	International	Netherlands
11–17	Ice hockey	(Spain) 2014 World Junior Ice Hockey Championships Division II – Group B	International	South Korea is promoted to Division II – Group A China is relegated to Division III
12–18	Ice hockey	(Turkey) 2014 World Junior Ice Hockey Championships Division III	International	Belgium is promoted to Division II – Group B
12–19	Snooker	(United Kingdom) 2014 Masters	International	(England) Ronnie O'Sullivan
12–26	Handball	(Denmark) 2014 European Men's Handball Championship	Continental	France
13–19	Figure skating	(Hungary) 2014 European Figure Skating Championships	Continental	Men: (Spain) Javier Fernández; Ladies: (Russia) Yulia Lipnitskaya; Pairs: (Russia) Tatiana Volosozhar / Maxim Trankov; Ice dancing: (Italy) Anna Cappellini / Luca Lanotte
13–26	Tennis	(Australia) 2014 Australian Open	International	Men: (Switzerland) Stanislas Wawrinka; Women: (China) Li Na
16–18	Motorsport	(Monaco) 82ème Rallye Automobile de Monte-Carlo	International	(France) Sébastien Ogier ( (Germany) Volkswagen) (France) Julien Ingrassia
16–25	Handball	(Algeria) 2014 African Men's Handball Championship	Continental	Algeria
16–25	Handball	(Algeria) 2014 African Women's Handball Championship	Continental	Tunisia
17–24	Squash	(United States) Tournament of Champions 2014	International	Men: (Egypt) Amr Shabana; Women: (Malaysia) Nicol David
18–29	Multi-sport	(India) 2014 Lusophony Games	International	India
19	Marathon	(India) Mumbai Marathon	International	(Kenya) Evans Ruto / (Ethiopia) Dinknesh Mekash
20–26	Figure skating	(Chinese Taipei) 2014 Four Continents Figure Skating Championships	Continental	Men: (Japan) Takahito Mura; Ladies: (Japan) Kanako Murakami; Pairs: (China) Sui Wenjing / Han Cong; Ice dancing: (United States) Madison Hubbell / Zachary Donohue
21–26	Cycling	(Australia) 2014 Tour Down Under	International	(Australia) Simon Gerrans ( (Australia) Orica–GreenEDGE)
24–26	Rugby sevens	(United States) 2014 USA Sevens	International	South Africa
24–6 February	Handball	(Bahrain) 2014 Asian Men's Handball Championship	Continental	Qatar
24–22 March	Basketball	(Mexico) / (Argentina) / (Brazil) / (Chile) / (Colombia) / (Ecuador) / (Puerto Rico) / (Uruguay) / (Venezuela) 2014 FIBA Americas League	Continental	(Brazil) Flamengo
25	Ice hockey	(United States) 2014 NHL Stadium Series #1 in Los Angeles	Domestic	(California) Anaheim Ducks
26	American football	(United States) 2014 Pro Bowl	Domestic	Team Rice
26	Ice hockey	(United States) 2014 NHL Stadium Series #2 in New York City	Domestic	(New York (state)) New York Rangers
26–2 February	Bandy	(Russia) XXXIVth Bandy World Championship for men	International	Russia
28–8 February	Futsal	(Belgium) UEFA Futsal Euro 2014	Continental	Italy
28–13 August	Association football	2014 Copa Libertadores	Continental	(Argentina) San Lorenzo
29	Ice hockey	(United States) 2014 NHL Stadium Series #3 in New York City	Domestic	(New York (state)) New York Rangers
29–2 February	Snooker	(Germany) 2014 German Masters	International	(China) Ding Junhui
29–1 November	Association football	2014 AFC Champions League	Continental	(Australia) Western Sydney Wanderers
31–1 February	Synchronized skating	(France) 2014 French Cup	International	(Finland) Team Unique (senior) (Finland) Team Fintastic (junior)

=== February ===
Date	Sport	Venue/Event	Status	Winner/s
1–2	Cyclo-cross	(Netherlands) 2014 UCI Cyclo-cross World Championships	International	Men's elite race: (Czech Republic) Zdeněk Štybar; Women's elite race: (Netherlands) Marianne Vos
1–8	Baseball	(Venezuela) 2014 Caribbean Series	Regional	(Mexico) Naranjeros de Hermosillo
1–15 March	Rugby union	(Europe) 2014 Six Nations Championship	Continental	Ireland
2	American football	(United States) Super Bowl XLVIII	Domestic	(Washington (state)) Seattle Seahawks; MVP: (California) Malcolm Smith of the Seattle Seahawks
5–8	Motorsport	62nd Rally Sweden	International	(Finland) Jari-Matti Latvala ( (Germany) Volkswagen) (Finland) Miikka Anttila
6–8	Synchronized skating	(Switzerland) Junior World Challenge Cup	International	(Finland) Team Fintastic
7–8	Rugby sevens	(New Zealand) 2014 Wellington Sevens	International	New Zealand
7–23	Multi-sport	(Russia) 2014 Winter Olympics	International	Russia
7–2 November	Association football	2014 CAF Champions League	Continental	(Algeria) ES Sétif
10–16	Tennis	2014 Qatar Total Open	International	(Romania) Simona Halep
13–15	Ice hockey	(Turkey) 2014 IIHF World U18 Championship Division III – Group B	International	South Africa is promoted to Division III – Group A
15–16 November	Motorsport	(United States) 2014 NASCAR Sprint Cup Series	Domestic	(California) Kevin Harvick ( (North Carolina) Stewart–Haas Racing)
15–2 August	Rugby union	(Australia) (New Zealand) (South Africa) 2014 Super Rugby season	International	(Australia) Waratahs
16	Basketball	(United States) 2014 NBA All-Star Game	Domestic	Eastern Conference (NBA); MVP: (Australia) Kyrie Irving of the (Ohio) Cleveland Cavaliers
19-22	Bandy	(Finland) VIIth Bandy World Championship for women	International	Russia
19–2 March	Snooker	(Wales) 2014 Welsh Open	International	(England) Ronnie O'Sullivan
21–14 November	Motorsport	(United States) 2014 NASCAR Camping World Truck Series	Domestic	(California) Matt Crafton ( (Ohio) ThorSport Racing)
22–15 November	Motorsport	(United States) 2014 NASCAR Nationwide Series	Domestic	(Georgia (U.S. state)) Chase Elliott ( (North Carolina) JR Motorsports)
23	Marathon	(Japan) 2014 Tokyo Marathon (WMM)	International	Men: (Kenya) Dickson Chumba; Women: (Ethiopia) Tirfi Tsegaye
23	Motorsport	(United States) 2014 Daytona 500	Domestic	(North Carolina) Dale Earnhardt Jr. ( (North Carolina) Hendrick Motorsports)
23–2 November	Motorsport	(European Union) / (Australia) / (Malaysia) / (Russia) / (South Africa) / (United States) 2014 Superbike World Championship season	International	(France) Sylvain Guintoli ( (Italy) Aprilia)
26–2 March	Track cycling	(Colombia) 2014 UCI Track Cycling World Championships	International	Germany and France (4 gold medals each)
26–3 March	Squash	(United States) Windy City Open 2014	International	(France) Grégory Gaultier

=== March ===
Date	Sport	Venue/Event	Status	Winner/s
4 Sept. 2013–4	Ice hockey	(Russia) / (Belarus) / (Croatia) / (Czech Republic) / (Kazakhstan) / (Latvia) / (Slovakia) / (Ukraine) 2013–14 KHL season	Regional	Continental Cup winner: (Russia) Dynamo Moscow; Top Scorer: (Russia) Sergei Mozyakin
1	Bandy	United States Bandy Final (Gunnar Cup)	Domestic	(Minnesota) Minneapolis Bandolier
1	Ice hockey	(United States) 2014 NHL Stadium Series #4 (final) in Chicago	Domestic	(Illinois) Chicago Blackhawks
1–7 December	Motorsport	(Australia) / (New Zealand) 2014 International V8 Supercars Championship	Regional	Overall driver winner: Jamie Whincup ( Red Bull Racing Australia); Pirtek Endurance Cup winners: Jamie Whincup / Paul Dumbrell; Team winners: Triple Eight Race Engineering
2	Ice hockey	(Canada) 2014 Heritage Classic (NHL)	Domestic	(Ontario) Ottawa Senators
3–16	Tennis	(United States) 2014 BNP Paribas Open	International	Men: (Serbia) Novak Djokovic; Women: (Italy) Flavia Pennetta
6–9	Motorsport	(Mexico) 2014 Rally México	International	(France) Sebastien Ogier ( (Germany) Volkswagen) (France) Julien Ingrassia
7–9	Athletics	(Poland) 2014 IAAF World Indoor Championships	International	United States
7–9	Speed skating	(Germany) 2013–14 ISU Speed Skating World Cup – World Cup 5	International	Netherlands
7–16	Multi-sport	(Russia) 2014 Winter Paralympics	International	Russia
7–18	Multi-sport	(Chile) 2014 South American Games	Regional	Brazil (gold and overall medals)
7–6 April	Ice hockey	(Slovakia) / (Belarus) / (Russia) 2014 KHL Nadezhda Cup	Regional	(Russia) Avangard Omsk
7–30 April	Ice hockey	(Russia) / (Croatia) / (Czech Republic) / (Kazakhstan) / (Latvia) / (Ukraine) 2014 KHL Gagarin Cup	Regional	(Russia) Metallurg Magnitogorsk
8–26 October	Association football	(United States) / (Canada) 2014 Major League Soccer season	Regional	Supporters' Shield winner: (Washington (state)) Seattle Sounders FC
9–16	Cycling	(France) 2014 Paris–Nice	International	(Colombia) Carlos Betancur ( (France) Ag2r–La Mondiale)
10–16	Figure skating	(Bulgaria) 2014 World Junior Figure Skating Championships	International	Men: (Canada) Nam Nguyen; Ladies': (Russia) Elena Radionova; Pairs: (China) Yu Xiaoyu / Jin Yang; Ice dance: (United States) Kaitlin Hawayek / Jean-Luc Baker
10–16	Snooker	(China) 2014 World Open	International	(England) Shaun Murphy
12–18	Cycling	(Italy) 2014 Tirreno–Adriatico	International	(Spain) Alberto Contador ( (Denmark) Team Tinkoff–Saxo)
14–16	Speed skating	(Netherlands) 2013–14 ISU Speed Skating World Cup – World Cup 6	International	Netherlands
14–16	Ski flying	(Czech Republic) FIS Ski-Flying World Championships 2014	International	(Germany) Severin Freund
14–21	Squash	(Malaysia) 2013 WSA World Championship	International	(England) Laura Massaro
15	Bandy	(Finland) Finnish Bandy Final	Domestic	(Finland) Oulun Luistinseura
15–19	Squash	(United States) 2013 PSA World Series Finals	International	(Egypt) Ramy Ashour
15–16	Volleyball	(Azerbaijan) 2013–14 CEV Women's Champions League Final Four	Continental	(Russia) Dinamo Kazan
15–16	Freestyle wrestling	(United States) 2014 FILA Wrestling World Cup – Men's freestyle	International	Iran
15–16	Freestyle wrestling	(Japan) 2014 FILA Wrestling World Cup – Women's freestyle	International	Japan
15–4 April	Association football	(Costa Rica) 2014 FIFA U-17 Women's World Cup	International	Japan
15–23	Curling	(Canada) 2014 Ford World Women's Curling Championship	International	Switzerland
16	Bandy	(Sweden) Swedish Bandy Final	Domestic	(Sweden) Sandvikens AIK
16	Formula One	(Australia) 2014 Australian Grand Prix	International	(Germany) Nico Rosberg ( (Germany) Mercedes)
16–6 April	Cricket	(Bangladesh) 2014 ICC World Twenty20 and 2014 ICC Women's World Twenty20	International	Men: Sri Lanka; Women: Australia
17–30	Tennis	(United States) 2014 Sony Open Tennis	International	Men: (Serbia) Novak Djokovic; Women: (United States) Serena Williams
18–23	Ice hockey	(Poland) 2014 IIHF World Women's U18 Championship Division I – Qualification	International	Austria is promoted to Division I "A"
18–7 April	Basketball	(United States) 2014 NCAA Division I Men's Basketball Tournament	Domestic	Connecticut Huskies
19–22	Ice hockey	(Mexico) 2014 IIHF Women's World Championship Division II – Group B Qualification	International	Mexico is promoted to Division II – Group B
22–23	Volleyball	(Turkey) 2013–14 CEV Champions League Final Four	Continental	(Russia) Belogorie Belgorod
22–23	Rugby sevens	2014 Japan Sevens	International	Fiji
22–8 April	Basketball	(United States) 2014 NCAA Division I Women's Basketball Tournament	Domestic	Connecticut Huskies
22–28 September	Baseball	(United States) / (Canada) 2014 Major League Baseball season	Regional	American League's Season MVP: (New Jersey) Mike Trout ( (California) Los Angeles Angels of Anaheim); National League's Season MVP: (Texas) Clayton Kershaw ( (California) Los Angeles Dodgers)
23	Cycling	(Italy) 2014 Milan–San Remo	International	(Norway) Alexander Kristoff ( (Russia) Team Katusha)
23	Motorcycle racing	2014 Qatar motorcycle Grand Prix	International	MotoGP: (Spain) Marc Márquez ( (Japan) Honda); Moto2: (Spain) Esteve Rabat ( (Japan) Kalex-Honda); Moto3: (Australia) Jack Miller ( (Austria) KTM)
23–30	Ice hockey	(Hungary) 2014 IIHF World Women's U18 Championship	International	Canada
24–30	Cycling	(Spain) 2014 Volta a Catalunya	International	(Spain) Joaquim Rodríguez ( (Russia) Team Katusha)
24–30	Figure skating	(Japan) 2014 World Figure Skating Championships	International	Men's: (Japan) Yuzuru Hanyu; Ladies': (Japan) Mao Asada; Pairs: (Germany) Aliona Savchenko / Robin Szolkowy; Ice dancing: (Italy) Anna Cappellini / Luca Lanotte
24–30	Ice hockey	(United Kingdom) 2014 IIHF World U18 Championship Division II – Group A	International	Lithuania is promoted to Division I – Group B Romania is relegated to Division II – Group B
24–30	Ice hockey	(Bulgaria) 2014 IIHF World U18 Championship Division III – Group A	International	Australia is promoted to Division II – Group B New Zealand is relegated to Division III – Group B
24–30	Ice hockey	(Iceland) 2014 IIHF Women's World Championship Division II – Group B	International	Croatia is promoted to Division II – Group A Turkey is relegated to Division II – Group B Qualification
28	Cycling	(Belgium) 2014 E3 Harelbeke	International	(Slovakia) Peter Sagan ( (Italy) Cannondale)
28–30	Rugby sevens	2014 Hong Kong Sevens	International	New Zealand
28–12 April	Ice hockey	(United States) 2014 NCAA Division I Men's Ice Hockey Tournament	Domestic	(New York (state)) Union Dutchmen
29–4 April	Ice hockey	(Germany) 2014 IIHF World Women's U18 Championship Division I	International	Switzerland is promoted to the Top Division; Great Britain is relegated to Division I Qualification
29–6 April	Curling	(China) 2014 World Men's Curling Championship	International	Norway (Thomas Ulsrud (skip))
30	Bandy	(Russia) Russian Bandy Final	Domestic	Yenisey
30	Cycling	(Belgium) 2014 Gent–Wevelgem	International	(Germany) John Degenkolb ( (Netherlands) Giant–Shimano)
30	Formula One	(Malaysia) 2014 Malaysian Grand Prix	International	(United Kingdom) Lewis Hamilton ( (Germany) Mercedes)
30–30 August	Motorsport	(United States) / (Canada) 2014 IndyCar Series season	Regional	(Australia) Will Power ( (United States) Team Penske)
31–6 April	Snooker	2014 China Open	International	(China) Ding Junhui

=== April ===
Date	Sport	Venue/Event	Status	Winner/s
6 Aug. 2013–23	Association football	2013–14 CONCACAF Champions League	International	(Mexico) Cruz Azul
3–6	Golf	(United States) 2014 Kraft Nabisco Championship	International	(United States) Lexi Thompson
3–6	Rally	2014 Rally de Portugal	International	(France) Sebastien Ogier ( (Germany) Volkswagen) (France) Julien Ingrassia
5	Horse racing	(United Kingdom) 2014 Grand National	Domestic	(France) Pineau de Re (jockey: (Republic of Ireland) Leighton Aspell, trainer: (United Kingdom) Richard Newland)
5–6	Triathlon	(New Zealand) 2014 ITU World Triathlon Series #1	International	Men: (Spain) Javier Gómez; Women: (United Kingdom) Jodie Stimpson
5–15	Ice hockey	(Serbia) / (Spain) 2014 IIHF World Championship Division II	International	Estonia is promoted to Division I – Group B Israel is relegated to Division II – Group B Spain is promoted to Division II – Group A Turkey is relegated to Division III
6	Formula One	2014 Bahrain Grand Prix	International	(United Kingdom) Lewis Hamilton ( (Germany) Mercedes)
6	Road cycling	(Belgium) 2014 Tour of Flanders	International	(Switzerland) Fabian Cancellara ( (United States) Trek Factory Racing)
6–12	Ice hockey	(Luxembourg) 2014 IIHF World Championship Division III	International	Bulgaria is promoted to Division II – Group B
6–12	Ice hockey	(Czech Republic) / (Latvia) 2014 IIHF Women's World Championship Division I	International	Czech Republic is promoted to the Elite Division; Slovakia is relegated to Division I – Group B Latvia is promoted to Division I – Group A Kazakhstan is relegated to Division II – Group A
6–12	Ice hockey	(Italy) 2014 IIHF Women's World Championship Division II – Group A	International	Italy is promoted to Division I – Group B Australia is relegated to Division II – Group B
7–12	Cycling	(Spain) 2014 Tour of the Basque Country	International	(Spain) Alberto Contador ( (Denmark) Tinkoff–Saxo)
10–13	Golf	(United States) 2014 Masters Tournament	International	(United States) Bubba Watson
10–25	Amateur boxing	(Bulgaria) 2014 AIBA Youth World Boxing Championships	International	United States (3 boxing titles)
11–21 September	Motorsport	(European Union) 2014 FIA European Hill Climb Championship season	Continental	Category I winner: (North Macedonia) Igor Stefanovski ( (Japan) Mitsubishi); Category II winner: (Italy) Simone Faggioli ( (France) Norma Auto Concept)
13	Marathon	(United Kingdom) 2014 London Marathon (WMM)	International	Men: (Kenya) Wilson Kipsang Kiprotich; Women: (Kenya) Edna Kiplagat
13	Cycling	(France) 2014 Paris–Roubaix	International	(Netherlands) Niki Terpstra ( (Belgium) Omega Pharma–Quick-Step)
13	Motorcycle racing	(United States) 2014 Motorcycle Grand Prix of the Americas	International	MotoGP: (Spain) Marc Márquez ( (Japan) Honda); Moto2: (Spain) Maverick Viñales ( (Germany) Kalex); Moto3: (Australia) Jack Miller ( (Austria) KTM)
13	WTCC	2014 FIA WTCC Race of Morocco	International	(Argentina) José María López ( (France) Citroën) (France) Sébastien Loeb ( (France) Citroën)
13–18	Squash	(Egypt) El Gouna International 2014	International	(Egypt) Ramy Ashour
13–19	Ice hockey	(France) / (Hungary) 2014 IIHF World U18 Championship Division I	International	Latvia is promoted to the Top Division; Italy is relegated to Division I – Group B Hungary is promoted to Division I – Group A Poland is relegated to Division II – Group A
13–20	Ice hockey	(Estonia) 2014 IIHF World U18 Championship Division II – Group B	International	Estonia is promoted to Division II – Group A Iceland is relegated to Division III – Group A
13–20	Tennis	(Monaco) 2014 Monte-Carlo Rolex Masters	International	(Switzerland) Stanislas Wawrinka
13–21 September	Motorsport	(European Union) 2014 Blancpain Endurance Series season	Continental	Pro Cup winner: (Belgium) Laurens Vanthoor ( (Belgium) W Racing Team); Pro Cup Team winners: (Germany) Christopher Mies / (Brazil) César Ramos ( (Belgium) W Racing Team); Pro-Am winners: (Italy) Andrea Rizzoli / Stefano Gai ( (Italy) Ferrari); Pro-Am Team winners: (Netherlands) Nick Catsburg / (France) Henry Hassid ( (Germany) TDS Racing BMW); Gentlemen trophy winners: (Portugal) Francisco Guedes / (United States) Peter Mann ( (Italy) AF Corse)
14–19	Ice hockey	(Canada) 2014 Allan Cup	Domestic	(Ontario) Dundas Real McCoys
16–13 June	Ice hockey	(United States) / (Canada) 2014 Stanley Cup playoffs (NHL)	Domestic	(California) Los Angeles Kings; MVP: (Ontario) Justin Williams of the Los Angeles Kings
17–27	Ice hockey	(Finland) 2014 IIHF World U18 Championships	International	United States
19–5 May	Snooker	(United Kingdom) 2014 World Snooker Championship	International	(England) Mark Selby
19–15 June	Basketball	(United States) / (Canada) 2014 NBA Playoffs	Continental	(Texas) San Antonio Spurs; MVP: (California) Kawhi Leonard of the San Antonio Spurs
19–19 October	Motorsport	(European Union) 2014 European Le Mans Series season	Continental	GTC team winners: (Russia) #73 SMP Racing; LMP2 team winners: (France) #36 Signatech Alpine; LMGTE team winners: (Russia) #72 SMP Racing
19–19 October	Motorsport	(European Union) 2014 FIA European Formula 3 Championship season	Continental	Rookie and overall driver winner: (France) Esteban Ocon ( (Italy) Prema Powerteam); Team championship winner: (Italy) Prema Powerteam
20	Road cycling	(Netherlands) 2014 Amstel Gold Race	International	(Belgium) Philippe Gilbert ( (United States) BMC Racing Team)
20	Formula One	(China) 2014 Chinese Grand Prix	International	(United Kingdom) Lewis Hamilton ( (Germany) Mercedes)
20	WTCC	2014 FIA WTCC Race of France	International	(France) Yvan Muller ( (France) Citroën) (Argentina) José María López ( (France) Citroën)
20–26	Ice hockey	(South Korea) / (Lithuania) 2014 IIHF World Championship Division I	International	Slovenia and Austria are both promoted to the Top Division; South Korea is relegated to Division I – Group B Poland is promoted to Division I – Group A Romania is relegated to Division II – Group A
20–30 November	Motorsport	(European Union) / (Bahrain) / (Brazil) / (China) / (Japan) / (United States) 2014 FIA World Endurance Championship season	International	Overall driver winners: (United Kingdom) Anthony Davidson ( (Germany) Toyota Motorsport GmbH) & (Switzerland) Sébastien Buemi ( (Germany) Toyota Motorsport GmbH) (tie); Overall GT driver winners: (Italy) Gianmaria Bruni ( (Italy) AF Corse) & (Finland) Toni Vilander ( (Italy) AF Corse) (tie); LMP1 Team Drivers' Trophy winners: (Switzerland) Mathias Beche ( (Switzerland) Rebellion Racing), (France) Nicolas Prost ( (Switzerland) Rebellion Racing), & (Germany) Nick Heidfeld ( (Switzerland) Rebellion Racing) (3-way tie); LMP2 overall winner: (Russia) Sergey Zlobin ( (Russia) SMP Racing); LMGTE Am Drivers winners: (Denmark) Kristian Poulsen ( (United Kingdom) Aston Martin Racing) & (Denmark) David Heinemeier Hansson ( (United Kingdom) Aston Martin Racing) (tie); Manufacturers' Championship winner: (Japan) Toyota; GT Manufacturers winner: (Italy) Ferrari; Private LMP1 Teams winners: (Switzerland) Rebellion Racing; LMP2 Teams winners: (Russia) SMP Racing; LMGTE Pro Teams winners: (Italy) AF Corse; LMGTE Am Teams winners: (United Kingdom) Aston Martin Racing
21	Marathon	(United States) 2014 Boston Marathon (WMM)	International	Men: (United States) Meb Keflezighi; Women: (Kenya) Rita Jeptoo
21–2 November	Motorsport	(European Union) 2014 Blancpain Sprint Series season	Continental	(Germany) Maximilian Götz ( (Germany) HTP Motorsport/Mercedes-Benz)
23–27	Wrestling	(Kazakhstan) 2014 Asian Wrestling Championships	Continental	Iran
23–27	Badminton	(Russia) 2014 European Badminton Championships	Continental	Denmark
24–26	Judo	(Ecuador) 2014 Pan American Judo Championships	Continental	Brazil
24–27	Judo	(France) 2014 European Judo Championships	Continental	France
25–26	Handball	(New Zealand) 2014 Oceania Handball Championship	Regional	Australia
26–27	Triathlon	(South Africa) 2014 ITU World Triathlon Series #2	International	Men: (Spain) Javier Gómez; Women: (United Kingdom) Jodie Stimpson
27	Motorcycle racing	(Argentina) 2014 Argentine motorcycle Grand Prix	International	MotoGP: (Spain) Marc Márquez ( (Japan) Honda); Moto2: (Spain) Esteve Rabat ( (Germany) Kalex); Moto3: (Italy) Romano Fenati ( (Austria) KTM)
28–5 May	Table tennis	(Japan) 2014 World Team Table Tennis Championships	International	(China)

=== May ===
Date	Sport	Venue/Event	Status	Winner/s
12 Oct. 2013–11	Rugby sevens	(Australia) / (United Arab Emirates) / (South Africa) / (United States) / (New Zealand) / (Japan) / (Hong Kong) / (Scotland) / (England) 2013–14 IRB Sevens World Series	International	New Zealand
28 Nov. 2013–17	Rugby sevens	(United Arab Emirates) / (United States) / (Brazil) / (China) / (Netherlands) 2013–14 IRB Women's Sevens World Series	International	New Zealand
2	Rugby league	(Australia) 2014 Anzac Test	International	Australia
3	Rugby league	(Australia) 2014 Pacific Rugby League International	International	Samoa
3	Horse racing	(United States) 2014 Kentucky Derby	Domestic	California Chrome (jockey: (Mexico) Victor Espinoza; trainer: (United States) Art Sherman)
3–11	Tennis	(Spain) 2014 Mutua Madrid Open	International	Men: (Spain) Rafael Nadal; Women: (Russia) Maria Sharapova
3–28 September	Motorsport	(European Union) 2014 FIA European Rallycross Championship season	Continental	SuperCars winner: (Sweden) Robin Larsson; Super1600s winner: (Russia) Sergej Zagumennov; TouringCars winner: (Sweden) Daniel Lundh
3–2 November	Motorsport	(European Union) 2014 International GT Open season	Continental	Main and Super GT winners: (Russia) Roman Mavlanov / (Italy) Daniel Zampieri; GTS winner: (Italy) Giorgio Roda; Team Super GT winner: V8 racing Team GTS winners: (Italy) AF Corse; Manufacturer's Cup (GT) winner: (United States) Chevrolet; Manufacturer's Cup (GTS) winner: (Italy) Ferrari; Gentleman's Cup winner: (Germany) Claudio Sdanewitsch
3–29 November	Motorsport	(European Union) / (Argentina) / (Canada) 2014 FIA World Rallycross Championship season	International	Overall winner: (Norway) Petter Solberg; Team winners: (Sweden) Ford Olsberg MSE
4	Motorcycle racing	(Spain) 2014 Spanish motorcycle Grand Prix	International	MotoGP: (Spain) Marc Márquez ( (Japan) Repsol Honda); Moto2: (Finland) Mika Kallio ( (Belgium) Marc VDS Racing Team); Moto3: (Italy) Romano Fenati ( (Austria) KTM)
4	WTCC	2014 FIA WTCC Race of Hungary	International	(France) Yvan Muller ( (France) Citroën) (Italy) Gianni Morbidelli ( (United States) Chevrolet)
4	Road running	Wings for Life World Run 2014	International	(Ethiopia) Lemawork Ketema (Norway) Elise Selvikvåg Molvik
5–10	Volleyball	(Brazil) 2014 FIVB Volleyball Men's Club World Championship	International	(Russia) Belogorie Belgorod
7–11	Volleyball	(Switzerland) 2014 FIVB Volleyball Women's Club World Championship	International	(Russia) Dynamo Kazan
8–10	American football	(United States) 2014 NFL draft	Domestic	#1 pick: Jadeveon Clowney, University of South Carolina ( (Texas) Houston Texans)
9	Athletics	(Qatar) Doha Diamond League	International	Kenya
9–21	Association football	(Malta) 2014 UEFA European Under-17 Championship	Continental	England
9–25	Ice hockey	(Belarus) 2014 IIHF World Championship	International	Russia
9–1 June	Road cycling	(Italy) 2014 Giro d'Italia	International	(Colombia) Nairo Quintana ( (Spain) Movistar Team)
9–5 October	Motorsport	(European Union) 2014 FIA International Hill Climb Cup season	Continental	Category I winner: (Bulgaria) Nikolay Zlatkov; Category II winner: (Czech Republic) Vaclav Janik
10–18	Association football	2014 OFC Champions League Final	Regional	(New Zealand) Auckland City
11	Formula One	(Spain) 2014 Spanish Grand Prix	International	(United Kingdom) Lewis Hamilton ( (Germany) Mercedes)
11	WTCC	2014 FIA WTCC Race of Slovakia	International	(France) Sébastien Loeb ( (France) Citroën World Touring Car Team); Race two cancelled, due to heavy rain.
12–18	Squash	(United Kingdom) 2014 PSA & WSA British Open	International	(France) Grégory Gaultier / (Malaysia) Nicol David
12–18	Tennis	(Italy) 2014 Internazionali BNL d'Italia	International	Men: (Serbia) Novak Djokovic; Women: (United States) Serena Williams
14	Association football	(Italy) 2014 UEFA Europa League Final	Continental	(Spain) Sevilla
14–25	Association football	(Vietnam) 2014 AFC Women's Asian Cup	Continental	Japan
15–16	Greco-Roman wrestling	(Iran) 2014 FILA Wrestling World Cup – Men's Greco-Roman	International	Iran
15–18	Basketball	(Italy) 2013–14 Euroleague Final Four	Continental	(Israel) Maccabi Tel Aviv B.C.
15–18	Golf	(United States) The Tradition	International	(United States) Kenny Perry
16–23	Ice hockey	(Canada) 2014 Memorial Cup	Continental	(Alberta) Edmonton Oil Kings
17	Horse racing	(United States) 2014 Preakness Stakes	Domestic	California Chrome (jockey: (Mexico) Victor Espinoza; trainer: (United States) Art Sherman)
17–18	Triathlon	(Japan) 2014 ITU World Triathlon Series #3	International	Men: (Spain) Javier Gómez; Women: (United States) Gwen Jorgensen
18	Athletics	(China) Shanghai Golden Grand Prix	International	United States
18	Motorcycle racing	(France) 2014 French motorcycle Grand Prix	International	MotoGP: (Spain) Marc Márquez ( (Japan) Repsol Honda); Moto2: (Finland) Mika Kallio ( (Belgium) Marc VDS Racing Team); Moto3: (Australia) Jack Miller ( (Austria) KTM)
18–20 September	Motorsport	(Canada) NASCAR Canadian Tire Series	Domestic	(Quebec) L.P. Dumoulin ( (United States) Dodge)
21–1 June	Association football	(France) 2014 Toulon Tournament	International	Brazil
22	Association football	(Portugal) 2014 UEFA Women's Champions League Final	Continental	(Germany) Wolfsburg
22–25	Golf	(United States) Senior PGA Championship	International	(Scotland) Colin Montgomerie
22–25	Golf	(United Kingdom) BMW PGA Championship	International	(Northern Ireland) Rory McIlroy
23–20 July	Volleyball	(Italy) 2014 FIVB Volleyball World League	International	United States
10 Oct. 2013–23	Rugby union	(England) / (France) / (Italy) / (Portugal) / (Romania) / (Wales) 2013–14 European Challenge Cup	Continental	(England) Northampton Saints
24	Association football	(Portugal) 2014 UEFA Champions League Final	Continental	(Spain) Real Madrid
11 Oct. 2013–24	Rugby union	(England) / (France) / (Ireland) / (Italy) / (Scotland) / (Wales) 2013–14 Heineken Cup	Continental	(France) Toulon
25	Formula One	2014 Monaco Grand Prix	International	(Germany) Nico Rosberg ( (Germany) Mercedes)
25	WTCC	2014 FIA WTCC Race of Austria	International	(France) Yvan Muller ( (France) Citroën) (Argentina) José María López ( (France) Citroën)
25	IndyCar	(United States) 2014 Indianapolis 500	Domestic	(United States) Ryan Hunter-Reay ( (United States) Andretti Autosport)
25–8 June	Tennis	(France) 2014 French Open	International	Men: (Spain) Rafael Nadal; Women: (Russia) Maria Sharapova
30–1 June	Rowing	(Serbia) 2014 European Rowing Championships	Continental	Czech Republic and Great Britain won 2 gold medals each.
30–9 June	Ice Hockey	(United States) 2014 Kelly Cup Finals	Domestic	Alaska Aces
31	Athletics	(United States) Prefontaine Classic	International	United States
31	Triathlon	(Germany) 2014 ETU Aquathlon European Championships	International	Men: (Ukraine) Oleksiy Syutkin; Women: (Czech Republic) Tereza Zimovjanova
31–1 June	Triathlon	(Spain) 2014 ITU Duathlon World Championships	International	Men: (France) Benoît Nicolas; Women: (France) Sandra Lévénez
31–1 June	Triathlon	(United Kingdom) 2014 ITU World Triathlon Series #4	International	Men: (Spain) Mario Mola; Women: (United States) Gwen Jorgensen
31–15 June	Field hockey	(Netherlands) 2014 Men's and Women's Hockey World Cup	International	Men: Australia; Women: Netherlands
17 Aug. 2013–31	Rugby union	(France) 2013–14 Top 14 season	Domestic	(Provence-Alpes-Côte d'Azur) Toulon
6 Sept. 2013–31	Rugby union	(England) 2013–14 Aviva Premiership	Domestic	(Northamptonshire) Northampton Saints
6 Sept. 2013–31	Rugby union	(Ireland) / (Italy) / (Scotland) / (Wales) 2013–14 RaboDirect Pro12	Continental	(Ireland) Leinster

=== June ===
Date	Sport	Venue/Event	Status	Winner/s
1	Motorcycle racing	(Italy) 2014 Italian motorcycle Grand Prix	International	MotoGP: (Spain) Marc Márquez ( (Belgium) Repsol Honda); Moto2: (Spain) Esteve Rabat ( (Belgium) Marc VDS Racing Team); Moto3: (Italy) Romano Fenati ( (Italy) Sky Racing Team by VR46)
2–20	Rugby union	(New Zealand) 2014 IRB Junior World Championship	International	England
3–8	Beach volleyball	(Italy) 2014 European Beach Volleyball Championships	Continental	Men: (Italy) Paolo Nicolai and Daniele Lupo; Women: (Netherlands) Madelein Meppelink and Marleen van Iersel
5	Athletics	(Italy) Golden Gala – Pietro Mennea	International	Kenya and the United States won 3 gold medals each
5–7	Baseball	(United States) 2014 Major League Baseball draft	Continental	#1 pick: (California) Brady Aiken, (California) Cathedral Catholic High School, ( (Texas) Houston Astros)
5–8	3x3 Basketball	(Russia) 2014 FIBA 3x3 World Championships	International	Men: Qatar; Women: United States
7	Horse racing	(United States) 2014 Belmont Stakes	Domestic	(Kentucky) Tonalist (jockey: (Dominican Republic) Joel Rosario; trainer: (France) Christophe Clement)
7–14	Fencing	(France) 2014 European Fencing Championships	Continental	Italy
8	Formula One	(Canada) 2014 Canadian Grand Prix	International	(Australia) Daniel Ricciardo ( (Austria) Red Bull Racing)
8	WTCC	2014 FIA WTCC Race of Russia	International	(Argentina) José María López ( (France) Citroën) (China) Ma Qinghua ( (France) Citroën)
8–17	Ice hockey	(Canada) / (United States) 2014 Calder Cup Finals	Continental	Texas Stars
10–15	Rhythmic gymnastics	(Azerbaijan) 2014 Rhythmic Gymnastics European Championships	Continental	Individual overall: Yana Kudryavtseva; Group overall: Russia
11	Athletics	(Norway) Bislett Games	International	United States
4–13	Ice hockey	(United States) / (Canada) 2014 Stanley Cup Final	Regional	(California) Los Angeles Kings
12–15	Golf	(United States) 2014 U.S. Open	International	(Germany) Martin Kaymer
12–13 July	Association football	(Brazil) 2014 FIFA World Cup	International	Germany
14	Athletics	(United States) Adidas Grand Prix	International	United States
15	Motorcycle racing	(Spain) 2014 Catalan motorcycle Grand Prix	International	MotoGP: (Spain) Marc Márquez ( (Belgium) Repsol Honda); Moto2: (Spain) Esteve Rabat ( (Belgium) Marc VDS Racing Team); Moto3: (Spain) Álex Márquez ( (Japan) Honda)
19–22	Golf	(United States) 2014 U.S. Women's Open	International	(United States) Michelle Wie
20–22	Rowing	(United Kingdom) 2014 Henley Women's Regatta	International	Friday's Results; Saturday's Results; Sunday's Results
22	Formula One	(Austria) 2014 Austrian Grand Prix	International	(Germany) Nico Rosberg ( (Germany) Mercedes)
22	WTCC	2014 FIA WTCC Race of Belgium	International	(France) Yvan Muller ( (France) Citroën) (Argentina) José María López ( (France) Citroën)
22–29	Handball	(Uruguay) 2014 Pan American Men's Handball Championship	Continental	Argentina
23–29	Snooker	(China) 2014 Wuxi Classic	International	(Australia) Neil Robertson
23–6 July	Tennis	(United Kingdom) 2014 Wimbledon Championships	International	Men: (Serbia) Novak Djokovic; Women: (Czech Republic) Petra Kvitová
26	Basketball	(United States) 2014 NBA draft	International	#1 pick: (Canada) Andrew Wiggins, University of Kansas ( (Ohio) Cleveland Cavaliers)
26–29	Golf	(United States) Senior Players Championship	International	(Germany) Bernhard Langer
27–28	Ice hockey	(United States) 2014 NHL entry draft	International	#1 pick: (Canada) Aaron Ekblad, (Ontario) Barrie Colts, ( Florida Panthers)
27–29	Triathlon	(United States) 2014 ITU World Triathlon Series #5	International	Men: (Spain) Javier Gómez; Women: (United States) Gwen Jorgensen
28	Motorcycle racing	(Netherlands) 2014 Dutch TT	International	MotoGP: (Spain) Marc Márquez ( (Belgium) Repsol Honda); Moto2: (Australia) Anthony West ( (Japan) Honda); Moto3: (Spain) Álex Márquez ( (Japan) Honda)
30–6 July	Snooker	(Australia) 2014 Australian Goldfields Open	International	(England) Judd Trump

=== July ===
Date	Sport	Venue/Event	Status	Winner/s
2–7	Fencing	(South Korea) 2014 Asian Fencing Championships	International	South Korea
3	Athletics	(Switzerland) Athletissima	International	Kenya
5	Athletics	(France) Meeting Areva	International	United States
5–27	Road cycling	2014 Tour de France	International	(Italy) Vincenzo Nibali ( (Kazakhstan) Astana)
6	Formula One	(United Kingdom) 2014 British Grand Prix	International	(United Kingdom) Lewis Hamilton ( (Germany) Mercedes)
8–20	Basketball	(Greece) 2014 FIBA Europe Under-20 Championship	International	Turkey
10–13	Golf	United States Senior Open	International	(Scotland) Colin Montgomerie
10–13	Golf	(England) 2014 Women's British Open	International	(United States) Mo Martin
11–12	Athletics	(United Kingdom) British Athletics Grand Prix – Glasgow	International	United States
11–19	Basketball	(China) 2014 FIBA Asia Cup	Continental	Iran
12–13	Triathlon	(Germany) 2014 ITU World Triathlon Series #6	International	Men: (United Kingdom) Alistair Brownlee; Women: (United States) Gwen Jorgensen
13	Motorcycle racing	(Germany) 2014 German motorcycle Grand Prix	International	MotoGP: (Spain) Marc Márquez ( (Belgium) Repsol Honda); Moto2: (Switzerland) Dominique Aegerter ( (France) Technomag carXpert); Moto3: (Australia) Jack Miller ( (Austria) KTM)
13–27	Water polo	(Hungary) 2014 Men's and Women's European Water Polo Championship	Continental	Men: Serbia; Women: Spain
15	Baseball	(United States) 2014 Major League Baseball All-Star Game	Domestic	American League (MVP: Mike Trout, (California) Los Angeles Angels)
15–20	Diving	(China) 2014 FINA Diving World Cup	International	China
15–23	Fencing	(Russia) 2014 World Fencing Championships	International	Italy and Russia
16 and 23	Association football	2014 Recopa Sudamericana	Continental	(Brazil) Atlético Mineiro
17–20	Golf	(England) 2014 Open Championship	International	(Northern Ireland) Rory McIlroy
17–26	Shooting	(Germany) 2014 IPC Shooting World Championships	International	South Korea
18	Athletics	(Monaco) Herculis	International	United States
19	Basketball	(United States) 2014 WNBA All-Star Game	Domestic	Eastern Conference; MVP: (Oregon) Shoni Schimmel of the (Georgia (U.S. state)) Atlanta Dream
20	Formula One	(Germany) 2014 German Grand Prix	International	(Germany) Nico Rosberg ( (Germany) Mercedes)
22–27	Athletics	(United States) 2014 World Junior Championships in Athletics	International	United States
22–27	Beach handball	(Brazil) 2014 Beach Handball World Championships	International	Men: Brazil; Women: Brazil
23–3 August	Multi-sport	(Scotland) 2014 Commonwealth Games	International	England
24–27	Golf	(United States) 2014 International Crown	International	Spain
24–27	Golf	(Wales) Senior Open Championship	International	(Germany) Bernhard Langer
25–24 August	Volleyball	(Japan) 2014 FIVB World Grand Prix	International	Brazil
27	Formula One	(Hungary) 2014 Hungarian Grand Prix	International	(Australia) Daniel Ricciardo ( (Austria) Red Bull)

=== August ===
Date	Sport	Venue/Event	Status	Winner/s
1–17	Rugby union	(France) 2014 Women's Rugby World Cup	International	England
2–10	Tennis	(Canada) 2014 Rogers Cup	International	Men: (France) Jo-Wilfried Tsonga; Women: (Poland) Agnieszka Radwańska
3	WTCC	2014 FIA WTCC Race of Argentina	International	(Argentina) José María López ( (France) Citroën) (both races won)
5–24	Association football	(Canada) 2014 FIFA U-20 Women's World Cup	International	Germany
6–10	Canoeing	(Russia) 2014 ICF Canoe Sprint World Championships	International	Hungary
7–10	Golf	(United States) 2014 PGA Championship	International	(Northern Ireland) Rory McIlroy
10	Motorcycle racing	(United States) 2014 Indianapolis motorcycle Grand Prix	International	MotoGP: (Spain) Marc Márquez ( (Japan) Honda); Moto2: (Finland) Mika Kallio ( (Belgium) Marc VDS Racing Team); Moto3: (Spain) Efrén Vázquez ( (Japan) Honda)
10–17	Athletics	(Switzerland) 2014 European Athletics Championships	Continental	(United Kingdom) Great Britain
11–17	Tennis	(United States) 2014 Western & Southern Open	Continental	Men: (Switzerland) Roger Federer; Women: (United States) Serena Williams
12	Association football	(Wales) 2014 UEFA Super Cup	Continental	(Spain) Real Madrid
13–24	Swimming	(Germany) 2014 European Aquatics Championships	Continental	Great Britain
14–17	Golf	(United States) 2014 LPGA Championship	International	(South Korea) Inbee Park
16–28	Multi-sport	(China) 2014 Summer Youth Olympics	International	China
16–4 October	Rugby union	(Argentina) / (Australia) / (New Zealand) / (South Africa) 2014 Rugby Championship	International	New Zealand
17	Motorcycle racing	2014 Czech Republic motorcycle Grand Prix	International	MotoGP: (Spain) Dani Pedrosa ( (Japan) Honda); Moto2: (Spain) Esteve Rabat ( (Belgium) Marc VDS Racing Team); Moto3: (France) Alexis Masbou ( (Japan) Honda)
19–23	Squash	(Malaysia) Malaysian Open 2014	International	(Egypt) Raneem El Weleily
21	Athletics	(Sweden) DN Galan	International	United States
21–25	Swimming	(Australia) 2014 Pan Pacific Swimming Championships	International	United States
23–24	Triathlon	(Sweden) 2014 ITU World Triathlon Series #7	International	Men: (United Kingdom) Jonathan Brownlee; Women: (United States) Sarah Groff
23–7 September	Equestrianism	(France) 2014 FEI World Equestrian Games	International	Great Britain
23–14 September	Road cycling	(Spain) 2014 Vuelta a España	International	(Spain) Alberto Contador ( (Denmark) / (Russia) Team Tinkoff–Saxo)
24	Athletics	(United Kingdom) British Athletics Grand Prix – Birmingham	International	Jamaica
24	Formula One	(Belgium) 2014 Belgian Grand Prix	International	(Australia) Daniel Ricciardo ( (Austria) Red Bull Racing)
24–31	Rowing	(Netherlands) 2014 World Rowing Championships	International	New Zealand
25–31	Badminton	(Denmark) 2014 BWF World Championships	International	China
25–31	Judo	(Russia) 2014 World Judo Championships	International	Japan
25–8 September	Tennis	(United States) 2014 US Open	International	Men: (Croatia) Marin Čilić; Women: (United States) Serena Williams
26–31	Squash	2014 PSA & WSA Hong Kong Open	International	Men: (Egypt) Mohd El Shorbagy; Women: (Malaysia) Nicol David
26–1 September	Triathlon	(Canada) 2014 ITU World Triathlon Series Grand Final	International	Men: (United Kingdom) Alistair Brownlee; Women: (United States) Gwen Jorgensen; Men's Overall winner: (Spain) Javier Gómez; Women's Overall winner: (United States) Gwen Jorgensen
27–13 December	American football	(United States) 2014 NCAA Division I FBS football season	Domestic	American: (Tennessee) Memphis Tigers, UCF Knights, and Cincinnati Bearcats; ACC: Florida State Seminoles; Big 12: (Texas) Baylor Bears & (Texas) TCU Horned Frogs; Big Ten: Ohio State Buckeyes; C-USA: (West Virginia) Marshall Thundering Herd; MAC: Northern Illinois Huskies; MW: (Idaho) Boise State Broncos; Pac-12: Oregon Ducks; SEC: Alabama Crimson Tide; Sun Belt: (Georgia (U.S. state)) Georgia Southern Eagles
28	Athletics	(Switzerland) Weltklasse Zürich	International	United States
30–14 September	Basketball	(Spain) 2014 FIBA Basketball World Cup	International	United States
30–21 September	Volleyball	(Poland) 2014 FIVB Volleyball Men's World Championship	International	Poland
31	Motorcycle racing	(United Kingdom) 2014 British motorcycle Grand Prix	International	MotoGP: (Spain) Marc Márquez ( (Japan) Honda); Moto2: (Spain) Esteve Rabat ( (Belgium) Marc VDS Racing Team); Moto3: (Spain) Álex Rins ( (Spain) Estrella Galicia 0,0)

=== September ===
Date	Sport	Venue/Event	Status	Winner/s
4–28 December	American football	(United States) 2014 NFL season	Domestic	AFC season winner: (Massachusetts) New England Patriots; NFC season winner: (Washington (state)) Seattle Seahawks
5	Athletics	(Belgium) Memorial Van Damme	International	United States
5–7	Rhythmic gymnastics	(Russia) 2014 Rhythmic Gymnastics World Cup Final	International	Individual overall: Yana Kudryavtseva; Group overall: Russia
6–19	Shooting	(Spain) 2014 ISSF World Shooting Championships	International	China
7	Formula One	(Italy) 2014 Italian Grand Prix	International	(United Kingdom) Lewis Hamilton ( (Germany) Mercedes)
7	Hurling	(Republic of Ireland) 2014 All-Ireland Senior Hurling Championship Final	Domestic	Drawn; replay on 27 September
8–14	Snooker	(China) 2014 Shanghai Masters	International	(England) Stuart Bingham
8–14	Wrestling	(Uzbekistan) 2014 World Wrestling Championships	International	Men freestyle: Russia; Greco-Roman: Armenia(golds)/Iran(points); Women freestyle: Japan; Overall: Russia
8–21	Sailing	(Spain) 2014 ISAF Sailing World Championships	International	France
10–12	American football	(Italy) 2014 IFAF Flag Football World Championship	International	Men: United States; Women: Canada
11–14	Golf	(France) 2014 Evian Championship	International	(South Korea) Kim Hyo-joo
11–28	Association football	(Ecuador) 2014 Copa América Femenina	Continental	Brazil
13	Formula E	(China) 2014 Beijing ePrix	International	(Brazil) Lucas di Grassi ( (Germany) Joest Racing)
14	Motorcycle racing	2014 San Marino and Rimini's Coast motorcycle Grand Prix	International	MotoGP: (Italy) Valentino Rossi ( (Japan) Yamaha); Moto2: (Spain) Esteve Rabat ( (Belgium) Marc VDS Racing Team); Moto3: (Spain) Álex Rins ( (Spain) Estrella Galicia 0,0)
16–21	Canoeing	(United States) 2014 ICF Canoe Slalom World Championships	International	France
19–4 October	Multi-sport	(South Korea) 2014 Asian Games	Continental	China
21	Formula One	2014 Singapore Grand Prix	International	(United Kingdom) Lewis Hamilton ( (Germany) Mercedes)
21	Gaelic football	(Republic of Ireland) 2014 All-Ireland Senior Football Championship Final	Domestic	(Munster) Kerry
21–28	Road cycling	(Spain) 2014 UCI Road World Championships	International	Germany
21–28	Rhythmic gymnastics	(Turkey) 2014 World Rhythmic Gymnastics Championships	International	Individual overall: Yana Kudryavtseva; Team Competition: Russia; Groups: Bulgaria; Overall: Russia
23–12 October	Volleyball	(Italy) 2014 FIVB Volleyball Women's World Championship	International	United States
24–28	Table tennis	(Portugal) 2014 European Table Tennis Team Championship	Continental	Portugal
26–28	Golf	(Scotland) 2014 Ryder Cup	International	Europe
26–28	Basketball	(Brazil) 2014 FIBA Intercontinental Cup	International	(Brazil) Flamengo
27	Hurling	(Republic of Ireland) 2014 All-Ireland Senior Hurling Championship Final Replay	Domestic	(Leinster) Kilkenny
27–5 October	Basketball	(Turkey) 2014 FIBA World Championship for Women	International	United States
28	Marathon	(Germany) 2014 Berlin Marathon (WMM)	International	Men: (Kenya) Dennis Kimetto; Women: (Ethiopia) Tirfi Tsegaye
28	Motorcycle racing	(Spain) 2014 Aragon motorcycle Grand Prix	International	MotoGP: (Spain) Jorge Lorenzo ( (Japan) Yamaha); Moto2: (Spain) Maverick Viñales ( (Spain) Pons HP 40); Moto3: (Italy) Romano Fenati ( (Italy) Sky Racing Team by VR46)
29–5 October	Tennis	2014 China Open	International	Men: (Serbia) Novak Djokovic; Women: (Russia) Maria Sharapova

=== October ===
Date	Sport	Venue/Event	Status	Winner/s
3–12	Artistic gymnastics	(China) 2014 World Artistic Gymnastics Championships	International	United States
5	WTCC	2014 FIA WTCC Race of China #1 (Beijing)	International	Race 1: (United Kingdom) Tom Chilton ( (Italy) ROAL Motorsport); Race 2: (United Kingdom) Robert Huff ( (Russia) Lada Sport)
5	Formula One	(Japan) 2014 Japanese Grand Prix	International	(United Kingdom) Lewis Hamilton ( (Germany) Mercedes)
5–12	Tennis	(China) 2014 Shanghai Rolex Masters	International	(Switzerland) Roger Federer
11–12	Motorsport	(Luxembourg) 2014 FIA Hill Climb Masters	Continental	Category I winner: (Belgium) Yanick Bodson ( (Germany) Porsche); Category II winner: (Switzerland) Eric Berguerand ( (United Kingdom) Lola Cars); Category III winner: (France) Nicolas Schatz ( (France) Norma Auto Concept); Nations Cup winners: Italy
12	Formula One	(Russia) 2014 Russian Grand Prix	International	(United Kingdom) Lewis Hamilton ( (Germany) Mercedes)
12	Marathon	(United States) 2014 Chicago Marathon (WMM)	International	Men: (Kenya) Eliud Kipchoge; Women: (Kenya) Rita Jeptoo
12	Motorcycle racing	(Japan) 2014 Japanese motorcycle Grand Prix	International	MotoGP: (Spain) Jorge Lorenzo ( (Japan) Yamaha); Moto2: (Switzerland) Thomas Lüthi ( (Switzerland) Interwetten Racing); Moto3: (Spain) Álex Márquez ( (Spain) Estrella Galicia 0,0)
12	WTCC	2014 FIA WTCC Race of China #2 (Shanghai)	International	Race 1: (Argentina) José María López ( (France) Citroën Total WTCC); Race 2: (Morocco) Mehdi Bennani ( (Italy) Proteam Motorsport)
12–18	Squash	(United States) 2014 PSA & WSA US Open	International	Men: (Egypt) Mohamed El Shorbagy; Women: (Malaysia) Nicol David
17–19	Fencing	(United States) Men's Foil World Cup	International	Men: (France) Jérémy Cadot; Team: Italy
18–24	Multi-sport	(South Korea) 2014 Asian Para Games	Continental	China (CHN)
19	Motorcycle racing	(Australia) 2014 Australian motorcycle Grand Prix	International	MotoGP: (Italy) Valentino Rossi ( (Japan) Yamaha); Moto2: (Spain) Maverick Viñales ( (Spain) Pons HP 40); Moto3: (Australia) Jack Miller ( (Finland) Red Bull KTM Ajo)
20–26	Tennis	(Singapore) WTA Tour Championships	International	Singles: (United States) Serena Williams; Doubles: (Zimbabwe) Cara Black / (India) Sania Mirza
21–29	Baseball	(United States) 2014 World Series	Domestic	(California) San Francisco Giants; MVP: (North Carolina) Madison Bumgarner (San Francisco Giants)
22–24	Draughts	(Turkey) 2014 Turkish Draughts World Championship	International	(Turkey) Faik Yildiz
22–24	Draughts	(Turkey) 2014 Rapid Draughts World Championship	International	(Russia) Ainur Shaibakov
25–15 November	Rugby league	(Australia) / (New Zealand) 2014 Four Nations	International	New Zealand
26	Motorcycle racing	(Malaysia) 2014 Malaysian motorcycle Grand Prix	International	MotoGP: (Spain) Marc Márquez ( (Japan) Honda); Moto2: (Spain) Maverick Viñales ( (Spain) Pons HP 40); Moto3: (Spain) Efrén Vázquez ( (Germany) SaxoPrint-RTG)
26	WTCC	2014 FIA WTCC Race of Japan	International	Race 1: (Argentina) José María López ( (France) Citroën Total WTCC); Race 2: (Italy) Gabriele Tarquini ( (Italy) / (Japan) Castrol Honda WTC Team)
26–2 November	Snooker	(China) 2014 International Championship	International	(England) Ricky Walden
27–2 November	Tennis	(France) Paris Masters	International	(Serbia) Novak Djokovic
29–7 December	Association football	(United States) 2014 MLS Cup Playoffs	Regional	(California) LA Galaxy; MVP: (Republic of Ireland) Robbie Keane (LA Galaxy)
31–1 November	Horse racing	(United States) 2014 Breeders' Cup	International	Click here for results

=== November ===
Date	Sport	Venue/Event	Status	Winner/s
2	Formula One	2014 United States Grand Prix	International	(United Kingdom) Lewis Hamilton ( (Germany) Mercedes)
2	Marathon	(United States) 2014 New York City Marathon (WMM)	International	Men: (Kenya) Wilson Kipsang; Women: (Kenya) Mary Keitany
8–11	Ice hockey	(Japan) 2015 IIHF Women's World Championship Qualification Series	International	Japan qualified to participate in the 2015 IIHF Women's World Championship
8–16	Weightlifting	(Kazakhstan) 2014 World Weightlifting Championships	International	China
9	Formula One	(Brazil) 2014 Brazilian Grand Prix	International	(Germany) Nico Rosberg ( (Germany) Mercedes)
9	Motorcycle racing	(Spain) 2014 Valencian Community motorcycle Grand Prix	International	MotoGP: (Spain) Marc Márquez ( (Japan) Honda); Moto2: (Switzerland) Thomas Lüthi ( (Switzerland) Interwetten Racing); Moto3: (Australia) Jack Miller ( (Finland) Red Bull KTM Ajo)
9–16	Tennis	(United Kingdom) 2014 ATP World Tour Finals	International	Singles: (Serbia) Novak Djokovic; Doubles: (United States) Bob Bryan / (United States) Mike Bryan
13–24	Amateur boxing	(South Korea) 2014 AIBA Women's World Boxing Championships	International	Russia
14–21	Squash	(Qatar) 2014 PSA World Championship	International	(Egypt) Ramy Ashour
14–23	Multi-sport	(Thailand) 2014 Asian Beach Games	Continental	Thailand
14–30	Multi-sport	(Mexico) 2014 Central American and Caribbean Games	Regional	Cuba
16	WTCC	2014 Guia Race of Macau	International	Race 1: (Argentina) José María López ( (France) Citroën Total WTCC); Race 2: (United Kingdom) Robert Huff ( (Russia) Lada Sport)
22	Formula E	(Malaysia) 2014 Putrajaya ePrix	International	(United Kingdom) Sam Bird ( (United Kingdom) Virgin Racing)
22–20 December	Association football	(Singapore) / (Vietnam) 2014 AFF Suzuki Cup	Regional	Thailand
23	Formula One	(United Arab Emirates) 2014 Abu Dhabi Grand Prix	International	(United Kingdom) Lewis Hamilton ( (Germany) Mercedes)
25–7 December	Snooker	(United Kingdom) 2014 UK Championship	International	(England) Ronnie O'Sullivan
28–13 December	Tennis	(United Arab Emirates) / (Singapore) / (India) / (Philippines) 2014 International Premier Tennis League season	Continental	(India) Indian Aces
29–7 December	Field hockey	(Argentina) 2014 Women's Hockey Champions Trophy	International	Argentina
30	Canadian football	(Canada) 2014 Grey Cup	Domestic	(Alberta) Calgary Stampeders; Grey Cup Most Valuable Player: (Texas) Bo Levi Mitchell (Calgary Stampeders)
30–6 December	Association football	(Japan) 2014 International Women's Club Championship	International	(Brazil) São José

=== December ===
Date	Sport	Venue/Event	Status	Winner/s
1–6	Squash	(Canada) 2014 WSF Women's World Team Championships	International	England
3–7	Swimming	(Qatar) 2014 FINA World Swimming Championships (25 m)	International	Brazil
6–14	Field hockey	(India) 2014 Men's Hockey Champions Trophy	International	Germany
7–13	Ice hockey	(Estonia) 2015 World Junior Ice Hockey Championships – Division II Group A	International	Great Britain is promoted to Division I Group B Romania is relegated to Division II Group B
7–21	Handball	(Croatia) / (Hungary) 2014 European Women's Handball Championship	Continental	Norway
10–15	Futsal	(Costa Rica) 2014 Women's Futsal World Tournament	International	Brazil
10–20	Association football	(Morocco) 2014 FIFA Club World Cup	International	(Spain) Real Madrid
11–17	Mind sport	(China) 2014 SportAccord World Mind Games	International	China and Russia (6 gold medals each)
13	Formula E	(Uruguay) 2014 Punta del Este ePrix	International	(Switzerland) Sébastien Buemi ( (France) DAMS)
13–19	Ice hockey	(Spain) 2015 World Junior Ice Hockey Championships – Division II Group B	International	Croatia is promoted to Division II Group A Iceland is relegated to Division III
14–20	Ice hockey	(Italy) / (Hungary) 2015 World Junior Ice Hockey Championships – Division I	International	Belarus is promoted to the Top Division; Slovenia is relegated to Division I Group B Kazakhstan is promoted to Division I Group A Hungary is relegated to Division II Group A
26–5 January 2015	Ice hockey	(Canada) 2015 World Junior Ice Hockey Championship	International	Canada

== American football ==
- Super Bowl XLVIII – the Seattle Seahawks (NFC) won 43–8 over the Denver Broncos (AFC)
  - Location: MetLife Stadium
  - Attendance: 82,529
  - MVP: Malcolm Smith, LB (Seattle)

== Archery ==
- January 24 – December 14: World Archery Official Website's Calendar
- November 16, 2013 – February 9, 2014: 2013–14 Indoor Archery World Cup
  - November 16 & 17, 2013, in Marrakesh
    - Host nation, Morocco, and the United States share both the gold and overall medals wins.
  - December 8 & 9, 2013, in Singapore
    - The United States won both the gold and overall medal tallies.
  - January 24–26, 2014, in Telford
    - United Kingdom and the United States have 2 gold medals each. However, United Kingdom won the overall medal tally.
  - February 7 – 9, 2014, in Las Vegas (World Cup Final)
    - United States won both the gold and overall medal tallies.
- February 25 – March 2: 2014 World Indoor Archery Championships at (France) Nîmes
  - Italy and Ukraine tied each other, with 3 gold medals. The United States won the overall medal tally.
- April 22 – September 7: 2014 Archery World Cup
  - April 22 – 27 in (China) Shanghai
    - The United States won both the gold and overall medal tallies.
  - May 13 – 18 in (Colombia) Medellín
    - South Korea won both the gold and overall medal tallies.
  - June 10–15 in (Turkey) Antalya
    - South Korea won both the gold and overall medal tallies.
  - August 5–10 in (Poland) Wrocław
    - Mexico and the United States won 2 gold medals each. However, India and Russia won 5 overall medals each.
  - September 6 & 7 in (Switzerland) Lausanne (final)
    - The United States won both the gold and overall medal tallies.
- July 21–26: 2014 European Archery Championships at (Armenia) Echmiadzin
  - Russia won both the gold and overall medal tallies.
- August 19–24: 2014 World Archery Field Championships at (Croatia) Zagreb
  - The United States won the gold medal tally. Great Britain won the overall medal tally.
- August 22–26: 2014 Summer Youth Olympics
  - China won 2 gold medals (including one at the mixed team event). China and South Korea won 2 overall medals each.
- September 15–20: 2014 European 3D Championships at (Estonia) Tallinn
  - Italy won both the gold and overall medal tallies.
- October 18–25: 2014 Pan American Archery Championships at (Argentina) Rosario
  - Mexico won both the gold and overall medal tallies.

== Association football ==
- August 6, 2013 – April 23, 2014: 2013–14 CONCACAF Champions League (First leg of final at Estadio Azul stadium in Mexico City. Second leg at Estadio Nemesio Díez in Toluca.)
  - (Mexico) Cruz Azul defeated fellow Mexican team Toluca on away goals after the final finished in a 1–1 draw on aggregate. Cruz Azu, which claimed its sixth title, would represent CONCACAF at the 2014 FIFA Club World Cup.
- August 8, 2013 – May 22, 2014: 2013–14 UEFA Women's Champions League (final at Estádio do Restelo in Lisbon)
  - (Germany) Wolfsburg defeated (Sweden) Tyresö 4–3 to claim its second consecutive title and second overall.
- September 17, 2013 – May 24, 2014: 2013–14 UEFA Champions League (final at Estádio da Luz in Lisbon)
  - (Spain) Real Madrid defeated crosstown rival Atlético Madrid 4–1 after extra time to claim its 10th title. Real Madrid would represent UEFA at the 2014 FIFA Club World Cup.
- September 19, 2013 – May 14, 2014: 2013–14 UEFA Europa League (final at Juventus Stadium in Turin)
  - (Spain) Sevilla defeated (Portugal) Benfica 4–2 in a penalty shootout after a scoreless draw following extra time. Sevilla claimed its third Europa League title.
- October 15, 2013 – May 18, 2014: 2013–14 OFC Champions League (First leg of final at (Vanuatu) Port Vila Municipal Stadium. Second leg at (New Zealand) Kiwitea Street in Auckland)
  - (New Zealand) Auckland City defeated (Vanuatu) Amicale 3–2 on aggregate to claim its sixth title. Auckland City would represent the OFC at the 2014 FIFA Club World Cup.
- January 28 – August 13: 2014 Copa Libertadores (First leg of final at Estadio Defensores del Chaco in (Paraguay) Asunción; second leg at Estadio Pedro Bidegain in (Argentina) Buenos Aires)
  - (Argentina) San Lorenzo defeated (Paraguay) Nacional, 2–1 on aggregate, to claim its first Copa Libertadores title. San Lorenzo would represent CONMEBOL at the 2014 FIFA Club World Cup.
- January 29 – November 1: 2014 AFC Champions League (First leg of final at Parramatta Stadium in (Australia) Sydney; second leg at King Fahd International Stadium in (Saudi Arabia) Riyadh)
  - (Australia) Western Sydney Wanderers FC defeated (Saudi Arabia) Al-Hilal FC, 1–0 in aggregate, to win its first AFC Champions League title. Western Sydney Wanderers would represent the AFC at the 2014 FIFA Club World Cup.
- February 7 – November 2: 2014 CAF Champions League (First leg of final at Stade Tata Raphaël in (Democratic Republic of the Congo) Kinshasa; second leg at Stade Mustapha Tchaker in (Algeria) Blida)
  - (Algeria) ES Sétif defeated (Democratic Republic of the Congo) AS Vita Club, via the away goals rule after the tied score of 3–3 in aggregate, to claim its second CAF Champions League title. ES Sétif would represent the CAF at the 2014 FIFA Club World Cup.
- March 15 – April 4: 2014 FIFA U-17 Women's World Cup in Costa Rica (final at Estadio Nacional in San José)
  - Japan defeated Spain, 2–0, to claim its first title. Italy took third place in this tournament defeating Venezuela.
- June 13 – July 13: 2014 FIFA World Cup in Brazil (final at Estádio do Maracanã in Rio de Janeiro)
  - Germany defeated Argentina, 1–0 after extra time, to claim its fourth FIFA World Cup title. The Netherlands took third place.
- August 5–24: 2014 FIFA U-20 Women's World Cup in Canada (final at Olympic Stadium in Montreal)
  - Germany defeated Nigeria, 1–0 in extra time, to claim its third U20 World Cup title. France took third place.
- August 12: 2014 UEFA Super Cup at Cardiff City Stadium in Wales
  - (Spain) Real Madrid defeated fellow Spanish side Sevilla, 2–0, to claim its second UEFA Super Cup win.
- August 14–27: 2014 Summer Youth Olympics
  - Boys: (gold) Peru; (silver) South Korea; (bronze) Iceland
  - Girls: (gold) China; (silver) Venezuela; (bronze) Mexico
- December 10–20: 2014 FIFA Club World Cup in Morocco
  - (Spain) Real Madrid defeated (Argentina) San Lorenzo, 2–0, to claim its first FIFA Club World Cup title. (New Zealand) Auckland City took third place.

== Badminton ==
- January 7 – December 28: 2014 BWF Calendar of Events
- January 7 – December 21: 2014 BWF Super Series
  - January 7–12 at (South Korea) (Seoul)
    - China won the gold tally.
  - January 14–19 at (Malaysia) (Kuala Lumpur)
    - China won the gold medal tally.
  - March 4–9 at (United Kingdom) (Birmingham)
    - China and Indonesia won 2 gold medals each.
  - April 1 – 6 at (India) (New Delhi)
    - China and Denmark won 2 gold medals each.
  - April 8 – 13 at (Singapore)
    - China won the gold medal tally.
  - June 10–15 at (Japan) (Tokyo)
    - China won the gold medal tally.
  - June 17–22 at (Indonesia) (Jakarta)
    - China and Denmark won 2 gold medals each.
  - June 24–29 at (Australia) (Sydney)
    - China and South Korea won 2 gold medals each.
  - October 14–19 at (Denmark) (Odense)
    - China won all the gold medals.
  - October 21–26 at (France) (Paris)
    - China won the gold medal tally.
  - November 11–16 at (Fuzhou)
    - Both China and India won 2 gold medals each.
  - November 18–23 at (Hong Kong) (Kowloon)
    - China won the gold medal tally.
  - December 17–21 at (United Arab Emirates) (Dubai) (final)
    - China won the gold medal tally.
- January 21 – December 13: 2014 BWF Grand Prix Gold and Grand Prix
  - January 21–26 at (India) (Lucknow)
    - China won the gold medal tally.
  - February 25 – March 2 at (Germany) (Mulheim)
    - Japan won the gold medal tally.
  - March 11–16 at (Switzerland) (Basel)
    - China won the gold medal tally.
  - March 25–30: YONEX-Sunrise Malaysia Grand Prix Gold in Johor Bahru
    - China won the gold medal tally.
  - April 15 – 19 at (New Zealand) (Auckland)
    - Indonesia won the gold medal tally.
  - April 15 – 20 at (Jiangsu)
    - China won the gold medal tally.
  - June 30 – July 5 at (Canada) (Vancouver)
    - South Korea won the gold medal tally.
  - July 8–13 at (United States) 2014 YONEX Suffolk County Community College U.S. Open Badminton Championships in New York City
    - Indonesia won the gold medal tally.
  - July 15–20 at (Chinese Taipei) (Taipei)
    - China and Indonesia won 2 gold medals each.
  - July 22–27 at (Russia) (Vladivostok)
    - Japan won the gold medal tally.
  - August 5–10 at (Brazil) (Rio de Janeiro)
    - Germany won the gold medal tally.
  - September 1–7 at (Vietnam) (Ho Chi Minh City)
    - Indonesia won the gold medal tally.
  - September 9–14 at (Palembang)
    - Host nation, Indonesia, won the gold medal tally.
  - October 7–12 at (Netherlands) (Almere)
    - Note: An event in London was scheduled to take place from September 30 to October 5, but it was cancelled.
    - Five different nations won one gold medal each.
  - October 28 – November 2 at (Germany) (Saarbrücken)
    - China won the gold medal tally.
  - November 4–9 at (Jeonju)
    - Host nation, South Korea, won the gold medal tally.
  - November 19–23 at (Scotland) (Glasgow)
    - Five different nations won one gold medal each.
  - November 25–30 at Macau
    - China won the gold medal tally.
  - December 8–13 (2014 K&D Graphics / Yonex Grand Prix) at (United States) Orange, California (final)
    - Chinese Taipei won the gold medal tally.
- February 10 – 15: 2014 Oceania Badminton Championships at Ballarat
  - Host nation, Australia, won the gold medal tally.
- February 11 – 16: 2014 European Men's and Women's Team Badminton Championships at (Switzerland) Basel
  - Men's Team Winners: Denmark
  - Women's Team Winners: Denmark
- April 7 – 18: 2014 BWF World Junior Championships at (Malaysia) Alor Setar
  - China won both the gold and overall medal tallies.
- April 22 – 27: 2014 Badminton Asia Championships in Gimcheon
  - China and South Korea had won 2 gold medals each. China won the overall medal tally.
- April 23 – 27: 2014 European Badminton Championships at (Russia) Kazan
  - Denmark won both the gold and overall medal tallies.
- April 23 – 29: 2014 African Badminton Championships at (Botswana) Gaborone
  - South Africa won the gold medal tally.
- May 18 – 25: 2014 Thomas & Uber Cup at (India) New Delhi
  - Japan defeated Malaysia, 3–2, to claim its first Thomas Cup win.
  - China defeated Japan, 3–1, to claim its 13th Uber Cup win.
- June 24–28: 2014 BWF European Club Championships in (France) Amiens
  - (Russia) Primorye Vladivostok defeated (France) BC Chambly Oise, 4–1 (in matches won), to claim its third consecutive European Club Championship win. Both (Czech Republic) TJ Sokol Vesely Jehnice and (France) AIX Universite teams won a bronze medal each.
- August 17–22: 2014 Summer Youth Olympics
  - Boys' Singles: (gold) (China) SHI Yuqi; (silver) (China) LIN Guipu; (bronze) (Indonesia) Anthony Sinisuka Ginting
  - Girls' Singles: (gold) (China) HE Bingjiao; (silver) (Japan) Akane Yamaguchi; (bronze) (Thailand) Busanan Ongbamrungphan
  - Mixed Doubles: (gold) (Malaysia) June Wei Cheam / (Hong Kong) NG Tsz Yau; (silver) (Japan) Kanta Tsuneyama / (Chinese Taipei) LEE Chia-Hsin; (bronze) (Sri Lanka) ANGODA VIDANALAGE S.P.D. / (China) HE Bingjiao
- August 25–31: 2014 BWF World Championships in (Denmark) Copenhagen
  - China won both the gold and overall medal tallies.

== Baseball ==
- March 22 – September 28: 2014 Major League Baseball season
- May 30: 2014 Civil Rights Game (Houston Astros vs. Baltimore Orioles) at Minute Maid Park in Houston
  - (Texas) Houston Astros defeated the (Maryland) Baltimore Orioles 2–1.
- May 30 – June 25: 2014 NCAA Division I baseball tournament (2014 College World Series on June 14–25 at TD Ameritrade Park in Omaha, Nebraska)
  - The (Tennessee) Vanderbilt Commodores defeated the Virginia Cavaliers 2–1 in the best-of-three-games final series to claim the school's first NCAA title in any men's sport.
- July 15: 2014 Major League Baseball All-Star Game at Target Field in Minneapolis
  - The American League defeated the National League, with the score of 5–3.
- July 23–30: 2014 Big League World Series at Easley, South Carolina
  - The Southeast Team (from (Florida) Clearwater) defeated Team Puerto Rico, 2–1, in the final match.
- July 29 – August 4: 2014 Little League Intermediate World Series at Livermore, California
  - Team West ( (Arizona) Nogales National LL) defeated Team Puerto Rico (Samaritana LL, San Lorenzo) 11–4 in the final match.
- August 1–10: 2014 WBSC U15 Baseball World Cup in the state of (Mexico) Baja California Sur. Cabo San Lucas, Ciudad Constitución, and La Paz will each play a role in this World Cup.
  - Cuba defeated the United States, 6–3, to claim its first U15 Baseball World Cup win. Venezuela won the bronze medal.
- August 9–16: 2014 Junior League World Series at Taylor, Michigan
  - Team Asia-Pacific (represented by the Chung-shan JLL team from (Chinese Taipei) Taichung) defeated Team USA Southwest (represented by the Oil Belt All-Stars team from (Texas) Corpus Christi), 9–1, in the final match.
- August 9–16: 2014 Senior League World Series at Bangor, Maine
  - Team USA Southwest (represented by the West University L.L. team from (Texas) Houston) defeated Team Latin America (represented by the Pariba L.L. team from (Curaçao) Willemstad), 7–4, to claim its second Senior League World Series title.
- August 14–24: 2014 Little League World Series in South Williamsport, Pennsylvania
  - Team Asia-Pacific (represented by the Seoul LL from South Korea) defeated Team Great Lakes (represented by the Jackie Robinson West LL from (Illinois) Chicago), 8–4, in the final match.
- September 1–7: 2014 WBSC Women's Baseball World Cup in Miyazaki
  - Host nation, Japan, defeated the United States, 3–0, to claim its fourth consecutive Women's Baseball World Cup title. Australia took the bronze medal.
- September 12–21: 2014 European Baseball Championship in the Czech Republic and Germany
  - The Netherlands defeated Italy, 6–3, to win its 21st European Baseball Championship title. Spain took the bronze medal.
- October 21–29: 2014 World Series
  - The (California) San Francisco Giants defeated the (Missouri) Kansas City Royals, 4–3 in games, to claim its eighth World Series title.
  - MVP of the series: (North Carolina) Madison Bumgarner, of the San Francisco Giants.
- November 7–16: 2014 WBSC U21 Baseball World Cup in Taichung
  - Chinese Taipei defeated Japan, 9–0, to win the inaugural IBAF's U21 Baseball World Cup.

== Basketball ==
- October 1, 2013 – April 11, 2014: 2013–14 Euroleague
  - April 15 – 25: 2013–14 Euroleague Quarter-finals
    - May 16 – 18: 2013–14 Euroleague Final Four at the Mediolanum Forum in (Italy) Milan
      - (Israel) Maccabi Tel Aviv defeated (Spain) Real Madrid, 98–86, to claim its sixth title.
- October 15, 2013 – February 19, 2014: 2013–14 Eurocup Basketball
  - March 4 – May 7: 2013–14 Eurocup Basketball Knockout Stage
    - (Spain) Valencia BC defeated (Russia) Unics Kazan, 165–140, to claim its third title.
- October 24, 2013 – April 27, 2014: 2013–14 EuroChallenge
  - (Italy) Grissin Bon Reggio Emilia defeated (Russia) Triumph Lyubertsy, 79–65, to claim its first title.
- October 29, 2013 – April 16, 2014: 2013–14 NBA season
  - The (Texas) San Antonio Spurs won the most regular-season games. Kevin Durant, of the Oklahoma City Thunder, was the top scorer for this season.
    - April 19 – June 15: 2014 NBA Playoffs
      - The (Texas) San Antonio Spurs defeated the (Florida) Miami Heat, 4–1 (in games won), to claim its fifth NBA title.
      - (California) Kawhi Leonard (of the San Antonio Spurs) was the MVP of this year's NBA finals.
- November 6, 2013 – March 28, 2014: 2013–14 EuroCup Women
  - (Russia) Dynamo Moscow defeated fellow Russian team, the Dynamo Kursk, 158–150, to claim its third title.
- November 6, 2013 – April 13, 2014: 2013–14 EuroLeague Women (Final four playoffs at (Russia) Yekaterinburg)
  - The (Turkey) Galatasaray team defeated fellow Turkish team, Fenerbahçe, 69–58, to win its first title.
- January 24 – March 22: 2014 FIBA Americas League
  - (Brazil) Flamengo defeated fellow Brazilian Pinheiros team, 85–78, to win its first FIBA Americas League title. (Uruguay) Aguada took the bronze medal.
- February 16: 2014 NBA All-Star Game at Smoothie King Center in New Orleans
  - The Eastern Conference defeated the Western Conference 163–155. (New Jersey) Kyrie Irving of the (Ohio) Cleveland Cavaliers was named MVP.
- March 18 – April 7: 2014 NCAA Division I Men's Basketball Tournament (Final Four at AT&T Stadium in Arlington, Texas)
  - The Connecticut Huskies defeated the Kentucky Wildcats, 60–54, to claim its fourth NCAA title.
- March 22 – April 8: 2014 NCAA Division I Women's Basketball Tournament (Final Four at Bridgestone Arena in Nashville, Tennessee)
  - The Connecticut Huskies defeated the (Indiana) Notre Dame Fighting Irish, 79–58, to claim its ninth NCAA title.
- May 16 – August 17: 2014 WNBA season
  - The (Arizona) Phoenix Mercury won the most regular-season games. (Georgia (U.S. state)) Maya Moore, of the Minnesota Lynx, was the top scorer for this season.
  - August 21 – September 12: 2014 WNBA Playoffs
    - The (Arizona) Phoenix Mercury swept the (Illinois) Chicago Sky 3–0 in the best-of-5 final series. It is the Mercury's third league title.
- June 5–8: 2014 FIBA 3x3 World Championships in Moscow
  - Men: Qatar defeated Serbia, 18–13, to claim its first title. Host nation, Russia, took third place.
  - Women: The United States defeated host nation, Russia, 15–8, to win its second consecutive title. Belgium took third place.
- June 20–24: 2014 FIBA U18 Americas Championship in Colorado Springs
  - Host nation, the United States, defeated Canada, 113–79, to win its seventh FIBA U18 Americas title. The Dominican Republic wins the bronze medal.
- June 28 – July 6: 2014 FIBA U17 World Championship for Women in (Czech Republic) Klatovy and Plzeň
  - The United States defeated Spain, 77–75, to claim its third consecutive FIBA U17 title. Hungary took third place.
- July 8–20: 2014 FIBA Europe Under-20 Championship in (Greece) Crete
  - Turkey defeated Spain, 65–57, to claim its first FIBA U20 title. Serbia took the bronze medal.
- July 19: 2014 WNBA All-Star Game at US Airways Center in (Arizona) Phoenix
  - The Eastern Conference defeated the Western Conference 125–124 in overtime. (Oregon) Shoni Schimmel of the (Georgia (U.S. state)) Atlanta Dream was named MVP.
- July 19 – October 12: 2014 FIBA 3x3 World Tour
  - July 19 & 20 in (Philippines) Manila
    - (Philippines) Manila West team defeated (Qatar) Team Doha, 21–17, to claim its first win.
  - August 2 & 3 in (China) Beijing
    - Team (China) Wukesong defeated Team (Japan) Nagoya, 21–10, to claim its first win.
  - August 15 & 16 in (United States) Chicago
    - Team (Canada) Saskatoon defeated Team (United States) Denver, 18–17, to claim its first win.
  - August 23 & 24 in (Czech Republic) Prague
    - Team (Serbia) Novi Sad defeated Team (Romania) Bucharest, 16–14, to claim its first win.
  - August 29 & 30 in (Switzerland) Lausanne
    - Team (Slovenia) Trbovlje defeated fellow Slovenian Team Kranj, 17–16, to claim its first win.
  - September 27 & 28 in (Brazil) Rio de Janeiro
    - Team (Brazil) São Paulo defeated fellow Brazilian Team Santos, 21–12, to claim its first win.
  - October 11 & 12 in (Japan) Tokyo (final)
    - Team (Serbia) Novi Sad defeated Team (Canada) Saskatoon, 21–11, to claim its second win.
- July 22–26: 2014 Centrobasket Championship for Women in (Mexico) Monterrey
  - Cuba defeated Puerto Rico, 58–47, to claim its 16th Centrobasket title. The Dominican Republic won the bronze medal.
- August 1–7: 2014 Centrobasket Championship for Men in Nayarit
  - Host nation, Mexico, defeated Puerto Rico, 74–60, to claim its third Centrobasket title. The Dominican Republic took third place.
- August 6–10: 2014 FIBA Americas Under-18 Championship for Women in Colorado Springs
  - The United States defeated Canada, 104–74, to claim its eighth Americas U18 title. Argentina won the bronze medal.
- August 8–16: 2014 FIBA Under-17 World Championship in (United Arab Emirates) Dubai
  - The United States defeated Australia, 99–92, to claim its third FIBA U17 title. Serbia won the bronze medal.
- August 18–26: 2014 Summer Youth Olympics
  - Boys' Dunk Contest: (gold) (France) Karim Mouliom; (silver) (Slovenia) Ziga Lah; (bronze) (China) FU Lei
  - Girls' Shoot-out Contest: (gold) (Spain) Lucia Togores Carpintero; (silver) (Slovenia) Ela Micunovic; (bronze) (United States) Katie Lou Samuelson
  - Boys' 3x3: (gold) Lithuania; (silver) France; (bronze) Argentina
  - Girls' 3x3: (gold) United States; (silver) Netherlands; (bronze) Spain
- August 19–28: 2014 FIBA Asia Under-18 Championship in (Qatar) Doha
  - China defeated Iran, 66–48, to claim its tenth Asia U18 Championship title. South Korea took the bronze medal.
- August 30 – September 14: 2014 FIBA Basketball World Cup (men) in Spain (final at the Palacio de Deportes, Madrid)
  - The United States defeated Serbia 129–92 to claim its fifth FIBA Basketball World Cup title. France took the bronze medal.
- September 5–7: 2014 FIBA Europe 3x3 Championships in Bucharest
  - Men: Host nation, Romania, defeated Slovenia, 18–16, to claim its first Europe 3x3 Championship title. Lithuania took third place.
  - Women: Russia defeated Slovenia, 16–13, to claim its first Europe 3x3 Championship title. Belgium took third place.
- September 26–28: 2014 FIBA Intercontinental Cup in (Brazil) Rio de Janeiro
  - (Brazil) Flamengo defeated (Israel) Maccabi Tel Aviv, 156–146 in two matches, to win its first FIBA Intercontinental Cup title.
- September 27 – October 5: 2014 FIBA World Championship for Women in (Turkey) Istanbul and Ankara (final at Ülker Sports Arena, Istanbul)
  - The United States defeated Spain, 77–64, to claim its ninth FIBA Women's World Championship title. Australia took the bronze medal.
- October 10–17: 2014 FIBA Asia Under-18 Championship for Women in (Jordan) Amman
  - China defeated Japan, 60–53, to claim its 14th FIBA Asia U18 Women's Championship title. South Korea took the bronze medal.
- December 12: 2014 FIBA 3x3 All Stars in (Qatar) Doha
  - Team (Serbia) Novi Sad defeated Team (Qatar) Doha, 20–12, in the final match.

== Beach soccer ==
- January 3 – December 14: Beach Soccer Worldwide Calendar of Events
- January 3–5: 2014 Copa América Beach Soccer at Recife
  - Host nation, Brazil, defeated Argentina 10–1 to claim its tenth title.
- February 13 – 15: 2014 Copa San Luis Futbol Playa at Merlo
  - Brazil defeated host nation, Argentina, 2–0.
- April 11 – 13: Copa Pílsener Fútbol Playa 2014 at (El Salvador) San Salvador
  - Brazil is the overall winner, having won all its matches.
- May 16 – 18: 2014 Riviera Maya Cup at (Mexico) Playa del Carmen
  - Brazil is the overall winner, having won all its matches.
- June 3–8: 2014 Euro Winners Cup at Catania
  - Russia's BSC Kristall team defeated Italy's Milano BS team, 2–0. Portugal's S.C. Braga team took third place.
- June 6–8: 2014 North American Sand Soccer Championship in Virginia Beach
  - Canada defeated Portugal's C.D. Nacional, with the score of 3–2. United States' Rush BSC, Ohio, took third place.
- June 12–24: 2014 ITV Fever Pitch in (United Kingdom) Manchester
  - Click here for the ITV Fever Pitch news.
- June 13–15: 2014 İstanbul Cup in Turkey
  - Russia's FC Lokomotiv Moscow defeated Turkey's Beşiktaş J.K., to claim its second title.
- June 20 – August 17: 2014 Euro Beach Soccer League
  - June 20–22 in Catania
    - Group 1 winner: Italy
    - Group 2 winner: Switzerland
  - June 27–29 in (Poland) Sopot
    - Group 1 winner: Portugal
    - Group 2 winner: Spain
  - July 11–13 in Moscow
    - Division A winners: Russia, Spain, and Belarus
    - Division B winners: Estonia and Azerbaijan
  - August 8–10 in Siófok
    - Division A winners: Ukraine
    - Division B (Group 1) winners: Hungary
    - Division B (Group 2) winners: Turkey
  - August 14–17: Promotional Final and the Superfinal in Torredembarra
    - Promotion Final: Hungary defeated Poland, 6–4, to win this event.
    - Superfinal: Russia defeated host nation, Spain, 4–3, to win this event.
- July 19 & 20: 2014 Beach Soccer Nations Cup in Linz
  - Germany defeated Austria, 6–5, in the final match.
- July 25–27: 2014 Mundialito at Vila Nova de Gaia
  - Portugal defeated Japan, 8–2, to claim its fifth Mundialito win. Hungary took third place.
- August 22–24: Tour El Jadida 2014 in Morocco
  - Host nation, Morocco, took first place, by winning both matches against the United Arab Emirates and Switzerland.
- August 28–31: 2014 Euro Beach Soccer Cup in (Azerbaijan) Baku
  - Spain defeated Switzerland, 8–6, in the final match. Russia took third place.
- November 4–8: 2014 Samsung Beach Soccer Intercontinental Cup in (United Arab Emirates) Dubai
  - Brazil defeated Russia, 3–2 at extra time, to win its first Intercontinental Cup title. Portugal took third place.
- December 12–14: 2014 Copa Lagos in Nigeria
  - Champions: Ivory Coast; Second: Nigeria; Third: Senegal

== Canadian football ==
- June 26 – November 8: 2014 CFL season
  - West Division CFL season winners: (Alberta) Calgary Stampeders
  - East Division CFL season winners: (Ontario) Hamilton Tiger-Cats
- November 29: 2014 Vanier Cup at Percival Molson Memorial Stadium in Montreal
  - The (Quebec) Montreal Carabins defeated the (Ontario) McMaster Marauders, 20–19, to claim its first Vanier Cup win.
- November 30: 102nd Grey Cup at BC Place in Vancouver
  - The (Alberta) Calgary Stampeders defeated the (Ontario) Hamilton Tiger-Cats, 20–16, to claim the team's seventh Grey Cup win.

== Cricket ==
- February 9 – March 1: 2014 ICC Under-19 Cricket World Cup in the United Arab Emirates
  - Winners: South Africa (first title). Second: Pakistan. Third: England.
- March 16 – April 6: 2014 ICC World Twenty20 and 2014 ICC Women's World Twenty20 together in Bangladesh
  - Men's winners: Sri Lanka (first title). Second: India. Third: West Indies
  - Women's winners: Australia (third consecutive title). Finalist: England

== Floorball ==
- Men's World Floorball Championships
  - Champion: Sweden
- Women's under-19 World Floorball Championships
  - Champion: Sweden
- Champions Cup
  - Men's champion: (Sweden) IBF Falun
  - Women's champion: (Sweden) Djurgårdens IF IBF

== Futsal ==
- August 27, 2013 – April 27, 2014: 2013–14 UEFA Futsal Cup
  - (Spain) FC Barcelona defeated (Russia) Dinamo Moskva, 5–2 in extra time, to claim its second UEFA Futsal Cup title. (Azerbaijan) Araz Naxçivan took third place.
- January 28 – February 8: UEFA Futsal Euro 2014 in Belgium
  - Italy defeated Russia 3–1, to claim its second title.
- April 21 – 27: 2014 Sudamericano de Clubes de Futsal – Zona Sur
  - (Brazil) Atlántico Erechim defeated (Argentina) Boca Juniors (futsal), 3–2.
- April 30 – May 10: 2014 AFC Futsal Championship in Vietnam
  - Japan defeated Iran, 3–0 in penalties, to claim its third title.
- August 12–16: 2014 Oceanian Futsal Championship in (New Caledonia) Païta
  - Malaysia won first place overall in this tournament and claimed its first OFS title. There is no knockout phase for this event.
- August 25–30: 2014 AFC Futsal Club Championship (finals) in (China) Chengdu
  - (Japan) Nagoya Oceans defeated (Thailand) Chonburi Blue Wave, 5–4 in extra time, to claim its second AFC Futsal Club title. (Iran) Dabiri Tabriz took third place.
- September 17–28: 2014 AFF Futsal Championship in Malaysia
  - Thailand defeated Australia, 6–0, to claim its tenth AFF Futsal Championship title. Vietnam took third place.

== Golf ==
=== Men ===
- October 10, 2013 – September 14, 2014: 2014 PGA Tour

Major championships

- April 10 – 13: 2014 Masters Tournament
  - Winner: (United States) Bubba Watson (Second Masters and Major win; sixth PGA Tour win)
- June 12–15: 2014 U.S. Open
  - Winner: (Germany) Martin Kaymer (Second Major win and first U.S. Open win; 21st professional win; third PGA Tour win)
- July 17–20: 2014 Open Championship
  - Winner: (Northern Ireland) Rory McIlroy (Third major win and first British Open win; 7th PGA Tour win)
- August 7–10: 2014 PGA Championship
  - Winner: (Northern Ireland) Rory McIlroy (Fourth major win and second PGA Championship; 9th PGA Tour win)

WGC

- February 19 – 23: 2014 WGC-Accenture Match Play Championship
  - Winner: (Australia) Jason Day (second PGA Tour win)
- March 6–9: 2014 WGC-Cadillac Championship
  - Winner: (United States) Patrick Reed (third PGA Tour win)
- July 31 – August 3: 2014 WGC-Bridgestone Invitational
  - Winner: (Northern Ireland) Rory McIlroy (eighth PGA Tour win)
- November 6–9: 2014 WGC-HSBC Champions
  - Winner: (United States) Bubba Watson (seventh PGA Tour win)

Other

- May 22–25: BMW PGA Championship
  - Winner: (Northern Ireland) Rory McIlroy (first BMW PGA Championship win, sixth European Tour win)
- September 26–28: 2014 Ryder Cup at the PGA Centenary Course near (Scotland) Auchterarder
  - (European Union) Team Europe defeated (United States) Team USA, 16½–11½, to claim its third consecutive and tenth overall Ryder Cup win.

=== Women ===
- January 23 – November 23: 2014 LPGA Tour

Major championships

- April 3 – 6: 2014 Kraft Nabisco Championship
  - Winner: (United States) Lexi Thompson (first major win; fourth LPGA Tour win)
- June 19–22: 2014 U.S. Women's Open
  - Winner: (United States) Michelle Wie (first major win; fourth LPGA Tour win)
- July 10–13: 2014 Women's British Open
  - Winner: (United States) Mo Martin (first major win; first LPGA Tour win)
- August 14–17: 2014 LPGA Championship
  - Winner: (South Korea) Inbee Park (second LPGA Championship win; fifth major win; 11th LGPA Tour win)
- September 11–14: 2014 Evian Championship
  - Winner: (South Korea) Kim Hyo-joo (first major and LPGA Tour win)

Other

- July 21–27: 2014 International Crown at Caves Valley Golf Club in (United States) Owings Mills, Maryland (debut event)
  - Spain wins the inaugural International Crown event.

=== Other ===
- August 19–26: 2014 Summer Youth Olympics
  - Boys' Individual: (gold) #1 (Germany) Jonas Liebich; (gold) #2 (Italy) Renato Paratore; (bronze) (Finland) Oliver Lindell
    - Note: Two gold medals awarded here. Therefore, no silver medal was awarded.
  - Girls' Individual: (gold) (South Korea) LEE Soyoung; (silver) (Chinese Taipei) CHENG Ssu-Chia; (bronze) (Denmark) Emily Kristine Pedersen

== Handball ==
- August 24, 2013 – June 1, 2014: 2013–14 EHF Champions League
  - March 20 – April 27: 2013–14 EHF Champions League knockout stage
    - May 31 & June 1: 2014 Men's Champions League Final Four in (Germany) Cologne
      - (Germany) Flensburg defeated fellow German team, THW Kiel, 30–28, to claim its first title.
- October 5, 2013 – May 4, 2014: 2013–14 EHF Women's Champions League
  - February 1 – March 16: 2013–14 EHF Women's Champions League Main Round
    - May 3 & 4: 2013–14 EHF Women's Champions League Final Four in (Hungary) Budapest
      - (Hungary) Győri Audi ETO KC defeated (Montenegro) ŽRK Budućnost, 27–21, to win its second title.
- January 12–26: 2014 European Men's Handball Championship in Denmark
  - France defeated the hosts, Denmark, 41–32 to claim its third title. Spain took third place.
- January 25 – February 6: 2014 Asian Men's Handball Championship in Bahrain
  - Qatar defeated the hosts, Bahrain, 27–26 to claim its first title. Iran took third place.
- February 8 – May 18: 2013–14 EHF Cup (final four in (Germany) Berlin)
  - (Hungary) Pick Szeged defeated (France) Montpellier, 29–28, to claim its first title.
- April 25 & 26: 2014 Oceania Handball Championship in Auckland
  - Australia defeated host nation, New Zealand, 54–36, to claim its eighth title.
- June 22–29: 2014 Pan American Men's Handball Championship in (Uruguay) Canelones
  - Argentina defeated Brazil, 30–19, to claim its third consecutive and sixth time overall Pan American title. Chile took third place.
- June 28 – July 13: 2014 Women's Junior World Handball Championship in Croatia
  - South Korea defeated Russia, 34–27, to claim its first IHF junior title. Denmark took third place.
- July 20 – August 3: 2014 Women's Youth World Handball Championship in Macedonia
  - Romania defeated Germany, 32–21, to claim its first Women's Youth World Handball Championship win. Denmark took the bronze medal.
- July 22–27: 2014 Beach Handball World Championships in Recife
  - Men: Brazil defeated Croatia, 2–1, to claim its fourth beach handball WC win. Qatar took third place.
  - Women: Brazil defeated Hungary, 2–0, to claim its third beach handball WC win. Norway took third place.
- July 24 – August 3: 2014 European Men's Junior Handball Championship in Austria
  - Germany defeated Sweden, 26–24, to claim its third Men's Junior Handball Championship win. Spain took the bronze medal.
- August 2–14: 2014 Asian Men's Junior Handball Championship in (Iran) Tabriz
  - Qatar defeated South Korea, 29–28, to claim its third consecutive and fourth overall Asian Men's Junior Handball title. Japan took the bronze medal.
- August 14–24: 2014 European Men's Youth Handball Championship in Poland
  - France defeated Hungary, 33–30, to claim its first European youth handball title. Spain took the bronze medal.
- August 20–25: 2014 Summer Youth Olympics
  - Boys: (gold) Slovenia; (silver) Egypt; (bronze) Norway
  - Girls: (gold) South Korea; (silver) Russia; (bronze) Sweden
- September 5–15: 2014 Asian Men's Youth Handball Championship in (Jordan) Amman
  - South Korea defeated Qatar, 26–25, to claim its second Asian Men's Youth Handball title. Japan took third place.
- September 8–14: 2014 IHF Super Globe in (Qatar) Doha
  - (Spain) FC Barcelona defeated (Qatar) Al Sadd, 34–26, to claim its second IHF Super Globe title. (Germany) Flensburg-Handewitt took third place.
- November 29 – December 12: 2014 Asian Club League Handball Championship in (Qatar) Doha
  - (Qatar) El Jaish SC defeated fellow Qatari team, Lekhwiya, 33–30, to claim its second consecutive Asian Club League Handball Championship title. (Kuwait) Al-Qurain took third place.
- December 7–21: 2014 European Women's Handball Championship in Hungary and Croatia
  - Norway defeated Spain, 28–25, to claim its sixth European Women's Handball Championship title. Sweden took third place.

== Field hockey ==
- January 3 – December 2014: 2014 FIH Calendar of Events
- January 10–18: 2012–13 Men's FIH Hockey World League Final in (India) New Delhi
  - Netherlands defeated New Zealand 7–2 to claim its first title.
- May 31 – June 15: 2014 Men's Hockey World Cup and 2014 Women's Hockey World Cup together in The Hague
  - Men: Australia defeated the Netherlands, 6–1, to claim its third title. Argentina took third place.
  - Women: The Netherlands defeated Australia, 2–0, to claim its seventh title. Argentina took third place.
- August 17–27: 2014 Summer Youth Olympics
  - Boys: (gold) Australia; (silver) Canada; (bronze) Spain
  - Girls: (gold) China; (silver) Netherlands; (bronze) Argentina
- November 29 – December 7: 2014 Women's Hockey Champions Trophy in San Miguel de Tucumán
  - Argentina defeated Australia, 3–1 in penalties (after a 1–1 tie in regular time), to claim its sixth Women's Hockey Champions Trophy title. The Netherlands took third place.
- December 6–14: 2014 Men's Hockey Champions Trophy in (India) Bhubaneshwar
  - Germany defeated Pakistan, 2–0, to win its tenth Men's Hockey Champions Trophy title. Australia took third place.

== Roller hockey ==
- April 17 – 19: 2014 Latin Cup at Viana do Castelo Municipality
  - Host nation, Portugal, defeated Spain in the final 3–2. France defeated Italy 6–1.
- July 14–19: 2014 CERH European Championship at Alcobendas
  - Champions: Italy; Second: Spain; Third: Portugal
- August 24–30: 2014 CERH European Roller Hockey U-17 Championship at (France) Gujan-Mestras
  - Italy defeated Spain, 1–0, to claim its fifth European U17 Roller Hockey title. Portugal took the bronze medal.
- October 6–14: 2014 CERH European U-20 Roller Hockey Championship at Valongo
  - Host nation, Portugal, defeated Spain, 3–2, to claim its fourth consecutive and 18th European U20 roller hockey title. France won the bronze medal.
- October 25 – November 1: 2014 FIRS Women's Roller Hockey World Cup at Tourcoing
  - Argentina defeated host nation, France, to claim their fifth FIRS Women's Roller Hockey World Cup title. Chile took the bronze medal.

== Lacrosse ==
- December 28, 2013 – April 26, 2014: 2014 NLL season
  - The Edmonton Rush won the most matches overall for this season.
  - Cody Jamieson, of the Rochester Knighthawks, was the top scorer for the 2014 NLL season.
    - May 3 – 31: 2014 NLL Champion's Cup playoffs
      - The Rochester Knighthawks defeated the Calgary Roughnecks, 2–1, to claim its third consecutive Champion's Cup win. Overall, this win is the fifth one for the Knighthawks. Dan Dawson was named MVP for these playoffs.
- May 9 – 25: 2014 NCAA Division I Women's Lacrosse Championship
  - The Maryland Terrapins, in their final game as a member of the Atlantic Coast Conference, defeated a fellow ACC team, the Syracuse Orange, 15–12 in the final at Johnny Unitas Stadium in Towson, Maryland to claim their 11th national title.
- May 7 – 26: 2014 NCAA Division I Men's Lacrosse Championship
  - In another all-ACC final, the Duke Blue Devils defeated the Notre Dame Fighting Irish 11–9 at M&T Bank Stadium in Baltimore to claim their second consecutive national title and third overall.
- July 10–19: 2014 World Lacrosse Championship in Denver
  - Canada defeated the United States 8–5, to claim its third world championship title. Haudenosaunee took third place.

== Multi-sport events ==
- January 18–29: 2014 Lusophony Games was held in Goa
  - Host nation, India, won both the gold and overall medal tallies.
- March 7–18: 2014 South American Games was held in (Chile) Santiago
  - Brazil won both the gold and overall medal tallies.
- March 15–22: 2014 Arctic Winter Games was held in (United States) Fairbanks
  - Host contingent, Alaska, won both the gold and overall medal tallies.
- May 14 – 24: 2014 South American Beach Games was held in Vargas
  - Host nation, Venezuela, won both the gold and overall medal tallies.
- May 22 – 31: 2014 African Youth Games was held in (Botswana) Gaborone
  - Egypt won the gold medal tally. South Africa won the overall medal tally.
- July 20–29: 2014 Micronesian Games was held in (Federated States of Micronesia) Pohnpei
  - Guam won the gold medal tally, with 42 of them. The FSM state of Pohnpei won the overall medal tally, with 114 medals.
- July 23 – August 3: 2014 Commonwealth Games was held in (Scotland) Glasgow
  - England won both the gold and overall medal tallies, with 58 and 174 respectively.
- August 9–16: 2014 Gay Games was held in (United States) Cleveland
  - Click here for the sporting events contested in these Games. Choose an event and then click on the Results link within that sport's description page.
- September 18 – October 4: 2014 Asian Games was held in (South Korea) Incheon
  - China (CHN) won both the gold and overall medal tallies, with 151 and 342 medals respectively.
- November 14–23: 2014 Asian Beach Games was held in Phuket
  - Host nation, Thailand, won both the gold and overall medal tallies.
- November 15–30: 2014 Central American and Caribbean Games was held in Veracruz
  - Cuba won the gold medal tally. Host nation, Mexico, won the overall medal tally.
- December 11–17: 2014 SportAccord World Mind Games will be held in Beijing
  - Host nation, China, and Russia won 6 gold medals each. China won the overall medal tally.

== Netball ==
International tournaments

Date	Tournament	Winners	Runners up
30 May–1 June	2014 Netball Europe Open Championships	Wales	Scotland
3–8 June	2014 Pacific Netball Series	Fiji	Samoa
24 Jul–3 Aug	2014 Commonwealth Games	Australia	New Zealand
19–25 August	2014 AFNA Championships	Trinidad and Tobago	Barbados
7–14 September	2014 Asian Netball Championships	Singapore	Sri Lanka
2–15 October	2014 Constellation Cup	Australia	New Zealand
28–31 October	2014 Taini Jamison Trophy Series	New Zealand	England
8–9 November	2014 Fast5 Netball World Series	New Zealand	Australia

Major leagues

Host	League	Winners	Runners up
Australia/New Zealand	ANZ Championship	Melbourne Vixens	Queensland Firebirds
United Kingdom	Netball Superleague	Manchester Thunder	Surrey Storm

== Olympic Games ==
- February 7 – 23: 2014 Winter Olympics was held in Sochi
  - Host nation, Russia, won both the gold and overall medal tallies, with 13 and 33 medals respectively. However, Russia was later stripped of 11 medals due to the Russian doping scandal.
- August 16–28: 2014 Summer Youth Olympics was held in Nanjing
  - Host nation, China, won both the gold and overall medal tallies, with 38 and 65 medals respectively.

== Paralympic Games ==
- March 7–16: 2014 Winter Paralympics was held in Sochi
  - March 8–16: Alpine Skiing
    - Host nation, Russia (RUS), and Germany (GER) won 6 gold medals each. However, Russia won the overall medal tally.
  - March 8–14: Biathlon
    - Host nation, Russia (RUS), won both the gold and overall medal tallies.
  - March 9–16: Cross-country skiing
    - Host nation, Russia (RUS), won both the gold and overall medal tallies.
  - March 8–15: Ice sledge hockey
    - (gold) United States; (silver) Russia; (bronze) Canada
  - March 8–15: Wheelchair curling
    - (gold) Canada; (silver) Russia; (bronze) Great Britain
- Russia (RUS) won the gold and overall medal tallies, with 30 and 80 medals respectively.

== Paralympic sports ==
- August 22, 2013 – April 6, 2014: IPC Alpine Skiing Calendar
- February 22 – August 25: 2014 IPC Athletics Grand Prix
  - February 22 – 25: 6th FAZZA International Athletics Competition in (United Arab Emirates) Dubai
  - April 14 – 16: The 2nd China Open Athletics Championships in Beijing
  - April 24 – 26: II Caixa Loterias Athletics and Swimming Open Championships in (Brazil) São Paulo
- April 5 – 11: 2014 IPC Powerlifting World Championships in (United Arab Emirates) Dubai
  - Nigeria won the gold medal tally. Egypt won the overall medal tally.
- April 10 – 13: 2014 UCI Para-cycling Track World Championships in (Mexico) Aguascalientes
  - Men: United Kingdom won the gold medal tally. Australia won the overall medal tally.
  - Women: United Kingdom won the gold medal tally. Australia won the overall medal tally.
  - Open winner: Spain; Second: China; Third: Russia
- April 13: 2014 IPC Athletics Marathon World Cup in (United Kingdom) London
  - Men: (Morocco) El Amin Chentouf
  - Women: (Spain) Maria Paredes Rodriguez
- May 26 – June 1: BNP Baripas World Team Cup (wheelchair tennis) in Alphen aan den Rijn
  - Men's World Cup winner: France (sixth title)
  - Women's World Cup winner: Netherlands (27th title)
  - Quad winner: Great Britain (fourth title)
  - Junior World Team Cup winner: Russia (first title)
- June 20–28: IWBF 2014 Women's World Wheelchair Basketball Championship in Toronto
  - Host nation, Canada, defeated Germany, 54–50, to claim its fifth title. The Netherlands won the bronze medal.
- June 21 & 22: 2014 WTF World Para-Taekwondo Championships in Moscow
  - Men's overall winners: Russia
  - Women's overall winners: Turkey
- July 1–14: 2014 IWBF Wheelchair Basketball World Championship for Men in (South Korea) Incheon
  - Australia defeated the United States, 63–57, to win its second consecutive men's wheelchair basketball world title. Turkey won the bronze medal.
- July 19–26: 2014 IPC Shooting World Championships in (Germany) Suhl
  - South Korea won both the gold and overall medal tallies.
- July 26 – August 3: 2014 European Para-Archery Championships in (Switzerland) Nottwil
  - Italy won the gold medal tally. Great Britain won the overall medal tally.
- August 1–10: 2014 IWRF World Wheelchair Rugby Championships in (Denmark) Odense
  - Australia defeated Canada, 67–56, to claim its first wheelchair rugby title. The United States won the bronze medal.
- August 4–10: 2014 IPC Swimming European Championships in (Netherlands) Eindhoven
  - Ukraine won the gold medal tally. Russia won the overall medal tally.
- August 16–24: 2014 IFDS Combined World Championships at the Royal Nova Scotia Yacht Squadron in (Canada) Halifax
  - Sonar winner: Team France (Bruno Jourdren – Helmsman)
  - SKUD 18 winner: Team Australia (Daniel Fitzgibbon – Helmsman)
  - 2.4mR winner: Team Germany (Heiko Kroeger – Helmsman)
  - Nations Cup winner: Australia
- August 18–23: 2014 IPC Athletics European Championships in (United Kingdom) Swansea
  - Russia won both the gold and overall medal tallies.
- August 28 – September 1: 2014 UCI Para-Cycling World Championships (road) in (United States) Greenville, South Carolina
  - For all the results, click here.
- August 30: 2014 ITU Paratriathlon World Championships in (Canada) Edmonton (part of the overall ITU Grand Final Series event)
  - Men: United States won 3 overall medals (2 golds included).
  - Women: Great Britain won both the gold and overall medal tallies.
- September 6–15: 2014 ITTF Para Table Tennis World Championships in (China) Beijing
  - For single events results, click here.
  - For team events results, click here.
- October 18–24: 2014 Asian Para Games in (South Korea) Incheon
  - China (CHN) won both the gold and overall medal tallies.

== Polo ==
- January 6–19: 2014 Snow Polo World Cup Finals in (China) Tianjin
  - England defeated Hong Kong 6–5.

== Rugby league ==
- 7 February: Super League XIX begins with the Huddersfield Giants upsetting last year's champions Wigan Warriors at the DW Stadium in Wigan, England.
- 14 & 15 February: Inaugural NRL Auckland Nines are held at Eden Park in Auckland, New Zealand. The North Queensland Cowboys are inaugural champions after beating Brisbane 16–7 in the final.
- 22 February: Sydney Roosters win the 2014 World Club Challenge after beating Wigan Warriors 36–14 at Allianz Stadium in Sydney, Australia.
- 25 February: Europe's Bradford Bulls team are deducted six Super League competition points after entering administration.
- 6 March: 2014 NRL season begins with the South Sydney Rabbitohs upsetting last year's champions Sydney Roosters at the ANZ Stadium in Sydney.
- 2 May: The 2014 ANZAC Test is played, with Australia defeating New Zealand 30–18 before 25,429 at Allianz Stadium.
- 3 May: The Pacific Rugby League International is played, with Samoa defeating Fiji 32–16 before 9,063 at Sportingbet Stadium in Penrith, Australia. In doing so they also secured qualification as the fourth and final team to compete at the 2014 Four Nations later in the year.
- 14 June: 2014 State of Origin series i won by New South Wales after losing 8 consecutive. New South Wales won the historic third-match in the series 6–4 before 83,421 at ANZ Stadium in Sydney, New South Wales.
- 23 August: The 2014 Challenge Cup final is played, with the Leeds Rhinos defeating the Castleford Tigers 23–10 before 77,914 at Wembley Stadium.
- 5 October: 2014 NRL Grand Final is played and South Sydney are the new premiers after defeating the Canterbury Bulldogs 30–6 in front of a record 'Rectangular Shaped (ANZ) Stadium' crowd of 83,833 at ANZ Stadium in Sydney.
- 11 October: 2014 Super League Grand Final is played and St. Helens are the new champions after defeating a '12-man' Wigan Warriors team 14–6 before 70,102 at Old Trafford in Strentford, England.
- 2 November: 2014 European Cup is won by Scotland for the first time. Scotland have therefore qualified to play alongside Australia, England and New Zealand in the 2016 Four Nations.
- 15 November: 2014 Four Nations Final is won by New Zealand who defeated Australia 22–18 before 25,093 at Westpac Stadium in Wellington, New Zealand.
- 19 December: New Zealand halfback, Shaun Johnson is announced as the best official player in 2014 after being awarded the Golden Boot.

== Rugby union ==
- October 10, 2013 – May 23, 2014: 2013–14 European Challenge Cup
  - (England) Northampton Saints defeated fellow English team of Bath, 30–16, to claim its second title.
- October 11, 2013 – May 24, 2014: 2013–14 Heineken Cup
  - In the last-ever Heineken Cup final, (France) Toulon defeated (England) Saracens 23–6 to claim its second consecutive title. The Heineken Cup was replaced the following season by the new European Rugby Champions Cup.
- October 12, 2013 – May 11, 2014: 2013–14 IRB Sevens World Series
  - New Zealand winning the Sevens World Series for the 12th time beating South Africa by 28 points in the overall standings. Fiji came in third.
- November 28, 2013 – May 17, 2014: 2013–14 IRB Women's Sevens World Series
  - New Zealand winning the IRB Women's Sevens World Series for the second time beating Australia by 4 points in the overall standings. Canada came in third.
- February 1 – March 15: 2014 Six Nations Championship
  - Champions: Ireland (12th title)
  - Triple Crown winner: England (24th title)
  - Calcutta Cup winner: England
  - Millennium Trophy winner: England
  - Centenary Quaich winner: Ireland
  - Giuseppe Garibaldi Trophy winner: France
- February 15 – August 2: 2014 Super Rugby season
  - The (Australia) Waratahs defeated the (New Zealand) Crusaders, 33–32, to claim its first Super Rugby title.
- April 7 – 19: 2014 IRB Junior World Rugby Trophy in Hong Kong
  - Japan defeated Tonga, 35–10, in the final. The United States took third place.
- June 2–20: 2014 IRB Junior World Championship in Auckland
  - England defeated South Africa, 21–20, to claim its second title. New Zealand took third place.
- June 7–21: 2014 IRB Pacific Nations Cup
  - Asia/Pacific Conference winner: Japan
  - Pacific Islands Conference winner: Samoa
- August 1–17: 2014 Women's Rugby World Cup in France
  - England defeated Canada, 21–9, to claim its second Women's Rugby World Cup win. Host nation, France, took third place.
- August 16 – October 4: 2014 Rugby Championship
  - Champions: New Zealand (13th title overall, third in Rugby Championship era)
  - Bledisloe Cup winner: New Zealand
  - Freedom Cup winner: New Zealand
  - Mandela Challenge Plate winner: South Africa
  - Puma Trophy winner: Australia
- August 17–20: 2014 Summer Youth Olympics
  - Boys: (gold) France; (silver) Argentina; (bronze) Fiji
  - Girls: (gold) Australia; (silver) Canada; (bronze) China

== Shooting ==
- January 2 – December 3: 2014 ISSF Calendar of Events
- March 26 – October 28: ISSF World Cup
  - March 26 – April 3: First ISSF WC for the Rifle and Pistol at (United States) Fort Benning
    - Italy and Russia won 2 gold medals each. China and Russia won 6 overall medals each.
  - April 8 – 15: First ISSF WC for the Shotgun only at Tucson
    - Five different national teams have won one gold medal each. However, host United States won the overall medal tally.
  - May 16 – 25: Second ISSF WC for the Shotgun only at (Kazakhstan) Almaty
    - Italy won both the gold and overall medal tallies.
  - June 4–13: First ISSF WC for all Three Guns at (Germany) Munich
    - China won both the gold and overall medal tallies.
  - June 13–21: Second ISSF WC for the Rifle and Pistol at (Slovenia) Maribor
    - China and Germany won 3 gold medals each. However, China won the overall medal tally.
  - July 1–10: Second ISSF WC for all Three Guns at Beijing
    - Host nation, China, won both the gold and overall medal tallies.
  - October 21–28: Final World Cup for all Three Guns at (Azerbaijan) Gabala
    - Russia won the gold medal tally. China won the overall medal tally.
- May 26 – June 1: ISSF Junior Cup at (Germany) Suhl
  - Russia and Ukraine won 4 gold medals each. However, Russia won the overall medal tally.
- August 17–22: 2014 Summer Youth Olympics
  - Boys' 10m Air Pistol: (gold) (Ukraine) Pavlo Korostylov; (silver) (South Korea) KIM Cheongyong; (bronze) (France) Edouard Dortomb
  - Boys' 10m Air Rifle: (gold) (China) YANG Haoran; (silver) (Armenia) Hrachik Babayan; (bronze) (Hungary) Istvan Peni
  - Girls' 10m Air Pistol: (gold) (Poland) Agata Nowak; (silver) (Russia) Margarita Lomova; (bronze) (South Korea) KIM Minjung
  - Girls' 10m Air Rifle: (gold) (Switzerland) Sarah Hornung; (silver) (Singapore) Martina Lindsay Veloso; (bronze) (Germany) Julia Budde
  - Mixed 10m Air Pistol: (gold) (Bulgaria) Nencheva / (Uzbekistan) Svechnikov; (silver) (Egypt) Mohamed / (Singapore) Teh; (bronze) (Guatemala) Madrid / (Latvia) Rasmane
  - Mixed 10m Air Rifle: (gold) (Egypt) Mekhimar / (Hungary) Peni; (silver) (Argentina) Russo / (Mexico) Valdes Martinez; (bronze) (Chinese Taipei) Lu / (Ukraine) Sukhorukova
- September 6–20: 2014 ISSF World Shooting Championships at (Spain) Granada
  - China won both the gold and overall medal tallies.
- October 13–19: CAT American Championships 2014 in (Mexico) Guadalajara
  - Men's 50m Rifle 3 Positions winner: (Cuba) Alexander Molerio Quintana
  - Men's 50m Rifle Prone winner: (Cuba) Reinier Estpinan
  - Men's 10m Air Rifle winner: (United States) Dempster Christenson
  - Men's 50m Pistol winner: (Cuba) Jorge Grau Potrille
  - Men's 25m Rapid Fire Pistol winner: (Cuba) Leuris Pupo
  - Men's 10m Air Pistol winner: (United States) Will Brown
  - Men's Trap winner: (Dominican Republic) Eduardo Lorenzo
  - Men's Double Trap winner: (Dominican Republic) Sergio Piñero
  - Men's Skeet winner: (United States) Vincent Hancock
  - Women's 50m Rifle 3 Positions winner: (Cuba) Eglys Yahima de la Cruz
  - Women's 10m Air Rifle winner: (Cuba) Eglys Yahima de la Cruz
  - Women's 25m Pistol winner: (Ecuador) Andrea Perez Peña
  - Women's 10m Air Pistol winner: (El Salvador) Lilian Castro
  - Women's Trap winner: (United States) Ashley Carroll
  - Women's Skeet winner: (United States) Amber English

== Softball ==
- January 16 – December 2014: WBSC Calendar of Events
- January 16–19: Men's International Fast Pitch Tournament in (United States) Altamonte Springs, Florida
  - Sureño Soy defeated Team USA 1–0 in the final.
- May 29 – June 4: 2014 NCAA Women's College World Series in Oklahoma City
  - The Florida Gators defeated the Alabama Crimson Tide 2–0 (out of 3 matches), to claim its first NCAA title.
- July 11–20: 2014 ISF Junior Men's World Championship in (Canada) Whitehorse
  - Team Argentina defeated New Zealand, 9–0, to claim its second consecutive World Junior Softball Championship title. Japan took the bronze medal.
- August 3–9: 2014 Big League Softball World Series and Senior League Softball World Series both in Sussex County, Delaware
  - Big League: Team USA East (represented by the roster from Milford) defeated fellow Delaware District 3 Host Team (represented by the roster from Laurel), 1–0, in the final match.
  - Senior League: Team USA Central (represented by the roster from (Indiana) South Bend) defeated Team USA West (represented by the roster from (Montana) Missoula) 5–0, in the final match.
- August 7–13: 2014 Little League Softball World Series in Portland, Oregon
  - Team East (represented by the roster from (New Jersey) Robbinsville) defeated Team Southwest (represented by the roster from (Louisiana) Bossier City), 4–1, in the final match.
- August 10–16: 2014 Junior League Softball World Series in Kirkland, Washington
  - Team USA East (represented by the West Point Little League team from (Pennsylvania) Greensburg) defeated Team Latin America (represented by the Mexicali Municipal Little League team from (Mexico) Mexicali), 6–2, in the final match.
- August 15–24: 2014 Women's Softball World Championship in (Netherlands) Haarlem
  - Japan defeated the United States, 4–1, to claim its third World Championship title. Australia took the bronze medal.

== Tennis ==
- December 30, 2013 – October 27, 2014: 2014 WTA Tour
- December 29, 2013 – November 9, 2014: 2014 ATP World Tour

Grand Slam

- January 13–26: 2014 Australian Open
  - Men's winner: (Switzerland) Stanislas Wawrinka (first Australian Open and Grand Slam title)
  - Women's winner: (China) Li Na (first Australian Open win; second Grand Slam title)
- May 25 – June 8: 2014 French Open
  - Men's winner: (Spain) Rafael Nadal (ninth French Open title win; 14th overall Grand Slam title win; already achieved the Career Golden Slam in 2010)
  - Women's winner: (Russia) Maria Sharapova (second French Open title win; fifth overall Grand Slam title win; already achieved the Career Grand Slam in 2012)
- June 23 – July 6: 2014 Wimbledon Championships
  - Men's winner: (Serbia) Novak Djokovic (second Wimbledon title win; 7th overall Grand Slam title win)
  - Women's winner: (Czech Republic) Petra Kvitová (second Wimbledon and Grand Slam title win)
- August 25 – September 8: 2014 US Open
  - Men's winner: (Croatia) Marin Čilić (first US Open and Grand Slam win)
  - Women's winner: (United States) Serena Williams (sixth US Open win; 18th overall Grand Slam title win; already achieved the Super Slam and Career Golden Slam in 2012)

Other

- December 28, 2013 – January 4, 2014: 2014 Hopman Cup
  - France defeated Poland 2–1, to claim its first title.
- December 29, 2013 – October 13, 2014: ATP World Tour 250 series
  - Most wins: (Croatia) Marin Čilić (3)
- December 30, 2013 – October 19, 2014: 2014 WTA Premier tournaments
  - Most wins: (United States) Serena Williams (5)
- December 30, 2013 – November 23, 2014: 2014 ATP Challenger Tour
  - Most wins: (France) Adrian Mannarino and (Luxembourg) Gilles Müller (5 wins each)
- January 31 – November 23: 2014 Davis Cup
  - Switzerland defeated France, 3–1 in matches won, to win its first Davis Cup title.
- February 8 – November 9: 2014 Fed Cup
  - The Czech Republic defeated Germany, 3–1 in matches won, to win its eighth Fed Cup title.
- February 10 – October 26: 2014 ATP World Tour 500 series
  - Most wins: (Japan) Kei Nishikori and (Switzerland) Roger Federer (2 wins each)
- March 6 – November 2: 2014 ATP World Tour Masters 1000
  - Most wins: (Serbia) Novak Djokovic (4)
- August 17–24: 2014 Summer Youth Olympics
  - Boys' Singles: (gold) (Poland) Kamil Adrian Majchrzak; (silver) (Brazil) Orlando Moraes Luz; (bronze) (Russia) Andrey Rublev
  - Boys' Doubles: (gold) (Brazil) Orlando Moraes Luz / Marcelo Zormann Silva; (silver) (Russia) Karen Khachanov / Andrey Rublev; (bronze) (Japan) Ryotaro Matsumura / Jumpei Yamasaki
  - Girls' Singles: (gold) (China) Xu Shilin; (silver) (Belarus) Iryna Shymanovich; (bronze) (Lithuania) Akvile Parazinskaite
  - Girls' Doubles: (gold) (Ukraine) Anhelina Kalinina and (Belarus) Iryna Shymanovich; (silver) (Russia) Daria Kasatkina / Anastasiya Komardina; (bronze) (Latvia) Jeļena Ostapenko and (Lithuania) Akvile Parazinskaite
  - Mixed doubles: (gold) (Japan) Jumpei Yamasaki and (China) Ye Qiuyu; (silver) (Switzerland) Jil Teichmann and (Poland) Jan Stanislaw Zieliński; (bronze) (Poland) Kamil Adrian Majchrzak and (Hungary) Fanni Ivett Stollar
- October 20–26: 2014 WTA Finals in Singapore
  - Singles winner: (United States) Serena Williams
  - Doubles winners: (Zimbabwe) Cara Black / (India) Sania Mirza
- November 9–16: 2014 ATP World Tour Finals in (United Kingdom) London
  - (Serbia) Novak Djokovic won the final by default because (Switzerland) Roger Federer withdrew from the match, due to back injury.
- November 19–23: 2014 ATP Challenger Tour Finals in (Brazil) São Paulo
  - Winner: (Argentina) Diego Schwartzman (first ATP Challenger Tour Finals win)
