= WSE European U-23 Roller Hockey Championship =

- Sport: Roller Hockey
- Founded: 2023; 3 years ago
- No. of teams: 5
- Continent: Europe (WSE)
- Most recent champion: Portugal (1st title)
- Most titles: Spain & Portugal (1 titles)

The WSE European U-23 Roller Hockey Championship is a European roller hockey competition for men's under-24 national teams, currently organised by WSE. Established in 2023 to replace the defunct Latin Cup, the tournament is set to be contested every two years between like its predecessor, but open to all European nations that want to take part.

== Results ==
=== Tournaments ===
Year	Edition	Host city	(gold) Gold	(silver) Silver	(bronze) Bronze	4th place
2023	1st	(Portugal) Paredes	Spain	Portugal	Italy	Switzerland
2025	2nd	(Spain) Sant Sadurní d'Anoia	Portugal	Spain	France	Italy

=== Medal table ===
Rank	Nation	Gold	Silver	Bronze	Total
1	Portugal	1	1	0	2
1	Spain	1	1	0	2
3	France	0	0	1	1
3	Italy	0	0	1	1
5	England	0	0	0	0
5	Switzerland	0	0	0	0
Totals (6 entries)		2	2	2	6
