= 2016 Latin Cup =

Coppa Latina 2016 (in Italian)

Tournament details
- Host country: Italy
- Dates: 24–26 March
- Teams: 4 (from 1 confederation)
- Venue(s): 1 (in 1 host city)

Final positions
- Champions: Portugal (14th title)
- Runners-up: Italy
- Third place: Spain
- Fourth place: France

Tournament statistics
- Matches played: 6
- Goals scored: 33 (5.5 per match)
- Top scorer(s): (Portugal) Hélder Nunes (9)

The 2016 Latin Cup was the 28th edition of the Latin Cup, an international youth roller hockey tournament organised by the Comité Européen de Rink-Hockey. It was held in Follonica, Italy, from 24 to 26 March 2016, and won by Portugal.

== Results ==
=== Standings ===
Team	Pts	Pld	W	D	L	GF	GA	GD
Portugal	9	3	3	0	0	14	5	+9
Italy	4	3	1	1	1	9	7	+2
Spain	4	3	1	1	1	6	9	−3
France	0	3	0	0	3	4	12	−8

=== Matches ===
24 March 2016
19:30

Spain	3–2	France
1–0 Pau Bargalló 11' 1at Hf; 2–0 Martí Casas 6' 2nd Hf; 3–2 Pau Bargalló 19' 2nd Hf		2–1 Carlo Di Benedetto 9' 2nd Hf; 2–2 Carlo Di Benedetto 12' 2nd Hf

Referee: Filippo Fronte (Italy), Joaquim Pinto (Portugal)
24 March 2016
21:15

Italy	3–4	Portugal
1–2 Giulio Cocco LD Blue 1' 2nd Hf; 2–2 Alessandro Verona 5' 2nd Hf; 3–4 Francesco Compagno 14' 2nd Hf		0–1 Hélder Nunes 7' 1st Hf; 0–2 Álvaro Morais "Alvarinho" 16' 1st Hf; 2–3 Hélder Nunes PWP+1 8' 2nd Hf; 2–4 Hélder Nunes 12' 2nd Hf

Referee: Raul Burgos (Spain), Arnaud Esoli (France)

25 March 2016
18h30

Portugal	5–1	Spain
1–0 Álvaro Morais "Alvarinho" 13' 1st Hf; 2–0 Hélder Nunes LD Blue 19' 1st Hf; 3–0 Hélder Nunes 6' 2nd Hf; 4–0 Álvaro Morais "Alvarinho" 6' 2nd Hf; 5–0 Hélder Nunes LD 10ªF 14' 2nd Hf		5–1 David Torres GP 18' 2ª P

Referee: Arnaud Esoli (France), Filippo Fronte (Italy)
25 March 2016
21:00

France	1–4	Italy
1-3 Antoine Le Berre LD 10ªF 13' 2nd Hf		0-1 Giulio Cocco 9' 1st Hf; 0-2 Alessandro Verona 12' 2nd Hf; 0-3 Francesco Compagno LD Blue 12' 2nd Hf; 1-4 Francesco Compagno LD 10ªF 17' 2nd Hf

Referee: Joaquim Pinto (Portugal), Raul Burgos (Spain)

26 March 2016
18:30

Portugal	5–1	France
1-0 Alexandre Marques "Xanoca" 9' 1st Hf; 2-0 Hélder Nunes GP Blue 11' 1st Hf; 3-1 Hélder Nunes LD 10ªF 9' 2nd Hf; 4-1 Xavier Cardoso "Xavi" 15' 2nd Hf; 5-1 Hélder Nunes 19'30" 2nd Hf		2-1 Roberto Di Benedetto 18' 1st Hf

Referee: Raul Burgos (Spain), Filippo Fronte (Italy)
26 March 2016
21:00

Italy	2-2	Spain
1-1 Giulio Cocco 19'25" 1st Hf; 2-1 Alessandro Verona 7' 2nd Hf		0-1 Marti Casas 7' 1st Hf; 2-2 Ignacio Alabart 17' 2nd Hf

Referee: Joaquim Pinto (Portugal), Arnaud Esoli (France)

== See also ==
- Roller Hockey
- CERH
