= 2014 Latin Cup (roller hockey) =

Taça Latina 2014 (in Portuguese)

Tournament details
- Host country: Portugal
- Dates: 17–19 April
- Teams: 4 (from 1 confederation)
- Venue: 1 (in 1 host city)

Final positions
- Champions: Portugal (13th title)
- Runners-up: Spain
- Third place: France
- Fourth place: Italy

Tournament statistics
- Matches played: 6
- Goals scored: 44 (7.33 per match)
- Top scorer: (Portugal) Hélder Nunes (6 goals)

The 2014 Latin Cup was the 27th edition of the Latin Cup, an international youth roller hockey tournament organised by the Comité Européen de Rink-Hockey. It was held in Viana do Castelo, Portugal, from 17 to 19 April 2014. Portugal won the competition for the first time since 2008, securing their 13th title.

== Results ==
=== Standings ===
Team	Pts	Pld	W	D	L	GF	GA	GD
Portugal	9	3	3	0	0	17	6	+11
Spain	6	3	2	0	1	12	5	+7
France	3	3	1	0	2	11	17	–6
Italy	0	3	0	0	3	4	16	–12

=== Matches ===
17 April 2014
20:00

Spain	4–1	France
1-0 Joan Salvat 3´1st Hf; 2-0 Joan Salvat 4´ 1st Hf; 3-1 Pablo Aguarón 31´2nd Hf; 4-1 Joan Salvat 38´2nd Hf		2-1 Carlo Benedetto 13´ 1st Hf

Monserrate Sports Hall, Viana do Castelo Municipality
Referee: João Paulo Romão (Portugal), Matteo Galoppi (Italy)
17 April 2014
21:30

Portugal	3–1	Italy
1-0 Pedro Vaz 13´1st Hf; 2-1 Hélder Nunes LD 10ªF 4´ 2nd Hf; 3-1 João Souto 7´ 2nd Hf		1-1 Giulio Cocco LD10ªF 4´ 2nd Hf

Monserrate Sports Hall, Viana do Castelo Municipality
Referee: Isaac Sainz (Spain), Xavier Jacquart (France)

18 April 2014
20h00

Italy	1–6	Spain
1-3 Giulio Cocco 13´2nd Hf		0-1 Pablo Aguaron 9´1st Hf; 0-2 Pau Bargalló 15´1st Hf; 0-3 Pau Bargalló 8´2nd Hf; 1-4 Pau Bargalló 15´2nd Hf; 1-5 Ferran Font 15´2nd Hf; 1-6 Marc Julià 17´2nd Hf

Monserrate Sports Hall, Viana do Castelo Municipality
Referee: João Paulo Romão (Portugal), Xavier Jacquart (France)
18 April 2014
21:30

France	3–11	Portugal
1-5 Corentin Turluer 4´2nd Hf; 2-8 Rémi Hermam 14´2nd Hf; 3-8 Erwan Debrouver 14´2nd Hf		0-1 Hélder Nunes GP 6´1st Hf; 0-2 Hélder Nunes LD 7´1st Hf; 0-3 Gonçalo Alves 16´1st Hf; 0-4 Miguel Rocha 2´2nd Hf; 0-5 João Souto 3´2nd Hf; 1-6 Miguel Rocha 4´2nd Hf; 1-7 Gonçalo Alves 8´LD 2nd Hf; 1-8 Gonçalo Alves 13´2nd Hf; 3-9 Gonçalo Alves 16´2nd Hf; 3-10 Hélder Nunes GP 17´2nd Hf; 3-11 Hélder Nunes 17´2nd Hf

Monserrate Sports Hall, Viana do Castelo Municipality
Referee: Isaac Sainz (Spain), Matteo Galoppi (Italy)

19 April 2014
20:00

France	7-2	Italy
1-0 Carlo Benedetto 5' 1st Hf; 2-0 Carlo Benedetto 12' 1st Hf; 3-0 Carlo Benedetto 13' 1st Hf; 4-1 Erwan Debrouver 20' 1st Hf; 5-1 Corentin Turluer 3' 2nd Hf; 6-1 Carlo Benedetto 9' 2nd Hf; 7-2 Carlo Benedetto 18' 2nd Hf		3-1 Giulio Cocco 19' 1st Hf; 6-2 Giulio Cocco GP 16' 2nd Hf

Monserrate Sports Hall, Viana do Castelo Municipality
Referee: Isaac Sainz (Spain) e João Paulo Romão (Portugal)
19 April 2014
21:30

Spain	2-3	Portugal
1-0 Marc Julià LD 10th F 2' 2nd Hf; 2-3 Álex Rodriguez GP 17' 2nd Hf		1-1 Pedro Vaz 6' 2nd Hf; 1-2 Hélder Nunes LD 15th F 13' 2nd Hf; 1-3 Telmo Pinto 15' 2nd Hf

Monserrate Sports Hall, Viana do Castelo Municipality
Referee: Xavier Jacquart (France) e Matteo Galoppi (Italy)

== Top Scorers ==
Rank	Gls	Player
Gold medal	6	(Portugal) Hélder Nunes
Silver medal	6	(France) Carlo Benedetto
Bronze medal	5	(Portugal) Gonçalo Alves

== See also ==
- Roller Hockey
- CERH
