= Latin Cup (roller hockey) =

International roller hockey tournament

- Sport: Roller Hockey
- Founded: 1956; 70 years ago
- Folded: 2018
- Replaced by: WSE European U-23 Roller Hockey Championship
- No. of teams: 4
- Continent: Europe (WSE)
- Last champion: Spain (12th title)
- Most titles: Portugal (14 titles)

The Latin Cup was an international roller hockey tournament held by the youth (under-23) national teams of France, Italy, Portugal and Spain.

Created in 1956, the tournament was held every year and hosted alternately in one of these countries. The first editions were played by senior players. Between 1964 and 1986, the competition did not take place. In 1987, it was restored, but opened only to young players (under-23). In 2001, Spain could not attend the Latin Cup and was replaced by Germany.

An edition was schedule for 2020, but was not disputed due to COVID-19 pandemic. In 2022 World Skate Europe would announce a new competition, WSE European U-23 Roller Hockey Championship to replace the Latin Cup. The new competition, also for U-23 players and held in the same time frame, every two years, would be open to all european nations and not to the 4 latin countries.

== Results ==
=== By edition ===
Year	Host city	(gold) Gold	(silver) Silver	(bronze) Bronze	4th place
1956	(France) Paris	Italy	Portugal	Spain	France
1957	(Italy) Bologna	Portugal	Italy	Spain	France
1958	(Spain) Barcelona	Spain	Portugal	Italy	France
1959	(Portugal) Lisbon	Portugal	Spain	Italy	France
1960	(France) Nantes	Portugal	Spain	Italy	France
1961	(Spain) Barcelona	Portugal	Spain	Italy	France
1962	(Portugal) Porto	Portugal	Spain	Italy	France
1963	(Italy) Bologna	Spain	Portugal	Italy	France
1987	(Portugal) Anadia	Italy	Portugal	Spain	France
1988	(Portugal) Anadia	Portugal	Italy	Spain	France
1989	(Portugal) Anadia	Portugal	Italy	Spain	France
1990	(Portugal) Anadia	Italy	Portugal	Spain	France
1995	(Portugal) Tavira	Spain	Portugal	Italy	France
1996	(Portugal) Portimão	Spain	Portugal	Italy	France
1997	(Portugal) Olhão	Spain	Portugal	France	Italy
1998	(Portugal) Tavira	Portugal	Spain	France	Italy
1999	(Portugal) Pico Island	Spain	Portugal	Italy	France
2000	(Portugal) Ponta Delgada	Spain	Portugal	Italy	France
2001	(Portugal) Lourinhã	Portugal	France	Italy	Germany
2002	(Portugal) Sintra	Portugal	Spain	Italy	France
2003	(Portugal) Alcobaça	Portugal	Spain	Italy	France
2004	(Portugal) Guimarães	Spain	Portugal	Italy	France
2006	(Italy) Viareggio	Spain	Portugal	Italy	France
2008	(Portugal) Coimbra	Portugal	Spain	Italy	France
2010	(France) Coutras	Spain	Portugal	Italy	France
2012	(Spain) Vilanova i la Geltrú	Spain	Portugal	France	Italy
2014	(Portugal) Viana do Castelo	Portugal	Spain	France	Italy
2016	(Italy) Follonica	Portugal	Italy	Spain	France
2018	(France) Saint-Omer	Spain	Italy	France	Portugal

=== By country ===
Team	Winners	Runners-up	Third place	Fourth place
Portugal	14 (1957, 1959, 1960, 1961, 1962, 1988, 1989, 1998, 2001, 2002, 2003, 2008, 2014, 2016)	14 (1956, 1958, 1963, 1987, 1990, 1995, 1996, 1997, 1999, 2000, 2004, 2006, 2010, 2012)	—	1 (2018)
Spain	12 (1958, 1963, 1995, 1996, 1997, 1999, 2000, 2004, 2006, 2010, 2012, 2018)	9 (1959, 1960, 1961, 1962, 1998, 2002, 2003, 2008, 2014)	7 (1956, 1957, 1987, 1988, 1989, 1990, 2016)	—
Italy	3 (1956, 1987, 1990)	5 (1957, 1988, 1989, 2016, 2018)	17 (1958, 1959, 1960, 1961, 1962, 1963, 1995, 1996, 1999, 2000, 2001, 2002, 2003, 2004, 2006, 2008, 2010)	4 (1997, 1998, 2012, 2014)
France	—	1 (2001)	5 (1997, 1998, 2012, 2014, 2018)	23 (1956, 1957, 1958, 1959, 1960, 1961, 1962, 1963, 1987, 1988, 1989, 1990, 1995, 1996, 1999, 2000, 2002, 2003, 2004, 2006, 2008, 2010, 2016)
Germany	—	—	—	1 (2001)
