= WSE European U-19 Roller Hockey Championship =

Roller hockey competition

- Current season, competition or edition: 2025 WSE European U-19 Roller Hockey Championship
- Sport: Roller Hockey
- Founded: 1953; 73 years ago
- No. of teams: 8
- Continent: Europe (WSE)
- Most recent champion: Portugal (22nd title)
- Most titles: Spain (24 titles)
- Website: Official website

The WSE European U-19 Roller Hockey Championship is a European roller hockey competition for men's under-20 national teams, currently organised by WSE. Established in 1953, the tournament was contested every two years between 1960 and 1968, after which it adopted an annual calendar. As of 2006, the championship reverted to a biennial competition.

The most successful team is Spain, with 23 titles, the most recent obtained at the 45th edition in 2006. The current champions are Portugal, who won the 2016 tournament in Pully, Switzerland, securing their fifth consecutive title. Until 2018 it was held in U-20 category. After 2021 it is held in U-19 category.

== Results ==
=== Tournaments ===
Year	Edition	Host city	(gold) Gold	(silver) Silver	(bronze) Bronze	4th place
1953	1st	(Portugal) Lisbon	Portugal	Spain	France	Belgium
1955–56	2nd	(Spain) Barcelona	Spain	Portugal	Italy	Germany
1957	3rd	(Portugal) Lisbon	Spain	Portugal	Belgium	Netherlands
1960	4th	(Portugal) Lisbon	Portugal	Spain	France	Germany
1962	5th	(Spain) Madrid	Spain	Germany	Portugal	Netherlands
1964	6th	(Spain) Salamanca	Spain	Portugal	France	Germany
1966	7th	(Spain) Gijón	Spain	Portugal	Germany	France
1968	8th	(Spain) Vigo	Spain	Portugal	Italy	Germany
1969	9th	(Spain) Vigo	Portugal	Spain	Italy	Germany
1970	10th	(Italy) Novara	Portugal	Spain	Germany	Italy
1971	11th	(West Germany) Iserlohn	Portugal	Spain	Italy	Netherlands
1972	12th	(Spain) Reus	Spain	Portugal	Italy	Netherlands
1973	13th	(Portugal) Paço de Arcos	Spain	Portugal	Netherlands	Italy
1975	14th	(West Germany) Darmstadt	Portugal	Spain	Netherlands	Italy
1976	15th	(Portugal) Barcelos	Portugal	Spain	Italy	Netherlands
1977	16th	(Netherlands) The Hague	Italy	Portugal	Netherlands	Spain
1978	17th	(Spain) Seville	Spain	Portugal	Italy	Germany
1979	18th	(England) Herne Bay	Spain	Germany	Italy	England
1980	19th	(Portugal) Barcelos	Portugal	Germany	Spain	Italy
1981	20th	(Switzerland) Geneva	Spain	Portugal	Italy	Germany
1982	21st	(Italy) Pordenone	Italy	Portugal	Spain	Germany
1983	22nd	(Belgium) Leuven	Italy	Germany	Spain	Portugal
1984	23rd	(Spain) Noia	Spain	Italy	Portugal	Germany
1985	24th	(France) Paris	Italy	Portugal	Spain	Netherlands
1986	25th	(Portugal) Anadia	Italy	Portugal	Spain	Switzerland
1987	26th	(West Germany) Walsum	Spain	Portugal	Italy	Germany
1988	27th	(Italy) Follonica	Italy	Switzerland	Portugal	Spain
1989	28th	(Netherlands) Valkenswaard	Spain	Italy	Switzerland	Portugal
1990	29th	(England) Barnsley	Italy	Portugal	Spain	Switzerland
1991	30th	(Spain) Blanes	Italy	Spain	Portugal	Switzerland
1992	31st	(Switzerland) Villeneuve	Portugal	Italy	Spain	Switzerland
1993	32nd	(Portugal) Sesimbra	Portugal	Spain	Italy	Switzerland
1994	33rd	(Germany) Wuppertal	Portugal	Spain	Germany	Italy
1995	34th	(France) La Roche-sur-Yon	Spain	Italy	Portugal	France
1996	35th	(Italy) Forte dei Marmi	Spain	Portugal	Italy	France
1997	36th	(Spain) Vic	Spain	Italy	Portugal	France
1998	37th	(Italy) Viareggio	Spain	Portugal	Italy	France
1999	38th	(Switzerland) Geneva	Spain	Portugal	Italy	Switzerland
2000	39th	(Portugal) Porto	Portugal	Spain	Italy	France
2001	40th	(France) Dinan	Spain	Portugal	Italy	Switzerland
2002	41st	(Italy) Follonica	Spain	Italy	Portugal	Switzerland
2003	42nd	(Portugal) Vale de Cambra	Portugal	Spain	Italy	Switzerland
2004	43rd	(Germany) Düsseldorf	Spain	Portugal	Italy	Switzerland
2005	44th	(Spain) Santander	Portugal	Spain	Switzerland	France
2006	45th	(France) Saint-Omer	Spain	Portugal	Italy	Switzerland
2008	46th	(Germany) Hamm	Portugal	Spain	Italy	Switzerland
2010	47th	(Italy) Viareggio	Portugal	Italy	Spain	France
2012	48th	(France) Saint-Omer	Portugal	Spain	France & Germany	
2014	49th	(Portugal) Valongo	Portugal	Spain	France	Italy
2016	50th	(Switzerland) Pully	Portugal	Italy	Spain	France
2018	51st	(Portugal) Viana do Castelo	Spain	Italy	Portugal	Germany
2021	52nd	(Portugal) Paredes	Portugal	Spain	Italy	England
2023	52nd	(Switzerland) Seedorf	Portugal	Spain	Italy	France
2025	53rd	(Italy) Viareggio	Portugal	Spain	France	Italy

54th in 2025.

== Medal table ==
Rank	Nation	Gold	Silver	Bronze	Total
1	Spain	24	19	9	52
2	Portugal	22	21	8	51
3	Italy	8	9	22	39
4	Germany	0	4	4	8
5	Switzerland	0	1	2	3
6	France	0	0	6	6
7	Netherlands	0	0	3	3
8	Belgium	0	0	1	1
Totals (8 entries)		54	54	55	163
