= 2016 CERH European Championship =

2016 CERH European Roller Hockey Championship
Euro 2016 – Oliveira de Azeméis
- 2016 CERH European Championship official logo

Tournament details
- Host country: Portugal
- City: Oliveira de Azeméis
- Dates: 11 – 16 July 2016
- Teams: 8
- Venue(s): 1 (in 1 host city)

Final positions
- Champions: Portugal (21st title)
- Runners-up: Italy
- Third place: Spain
- Fourth place: Switzerland

Tournament statistics
- Matches played: 24
- Goals scored: 182 (7.58 per match)
- Top scorer(s): (Portugal) João Rodrigues (13 goals)

The 2016 CERH European Championship was the 52nd edition of the CERH European Roller Hockey Championship, a biennial tournament for men's national roller hockey teams of Europe organised by CERH, which took place between 11 and 16 July in Oliveira de Azeméis, Portugal.

Eight teams competed in the tournament to determine the successor of Italy, who won the previous edition. In the final, hosts Portugal defeated the defending champions Italy 6–2 to secure a record-breaking 21st title, their first since 1998, when they beat Spain in the final.

== Teams ==
The following eight teams competed at the tournament:

Team	Appearance	Last appearance	Previous best performance
Austria	7th	2010	Eighth place (2010)
England	51st	2012	Champions (1926, 1927, 1928, 1929, 1930, 1931, 1932, 1934, 1936, 1937, 1938, 1939)
France	51st	2014	Runners-up (1926, 1927, 1928, 1930, 1931)
Germany	48th	2014	Runners-up (1932, 1934)
Italy	50th	2014	Champions (1953, 1990, 2014)
Portugal	47th	2014	Champions (1947, 1948, 1949, 1950, 1952, 1956, 1959, 1961, 1963, 1965, 1967, 1971, 1973, 1975, 1977, 1987, 1992, 1994, 1996, 1998)
Spain	39th	2014	Champions (1951, 1954, 1955, 1957, 1969, 1979, 1981, 1983, 1985, 2000, 2002, 2004, 2006, 2008, 2010, 2012)
Switzerland	52nd	2014	Runners-up (1937, 2006)

== Venue ==
All the games of the tournament were played in Oliveira de Azeméis, Portugal.

Oliveira de Azeméis	2016 CERH European Championship is located in Portugal
Pavilhão Dr. Salvador Machado	2016 CERH European Championship is located in Portugal
Capacity: 2,300	2016 CERH European Championship is located in Portugal

== Squads ==
Each team submitted a squad of 10 players, including 2 goalkeepers.

== Match officials ==
The referee teams were announced on 5 February 2016. Each team has two referees.

Country	Referees
Portugal	Rui Torres; Paulo Rainha
Spain	Óscar Valverde; Francisco Garcia
Italy	Franco Ferrari; Matteo Galoppi
France; England	Xavier Jacquart; Derek Bell
Germany; Switzerland	Thomas Ullrich; Roland Eggimann

== Draw ==
The 8 teams were divided in two groups, each group with 4 teams. The draw resulted in the following groups:

Group A
Pos	Team
A1	Italy
A2	Germany
A3	France
A4	England

Group B
Pos	Team
B1	Portugal
B2	Spain
B3	Switzerland
B4	Austria

== Group stage ==
All teams advanced to the quarter-finals.

Tiebreakers

The teams were ranked according to points (3 points for a win, 1 point for a draw, 0 points for a loss). If two or more teams were equal on points on completion of the group matches, the following tie-breaking criteria were applied, in the order given, to determine the rankings:

1. Higher number of points obtained in the group matches played among the teams in question;
2. Superior goal difference resulting from the group matches played among the teams in question;
3. Superior goal difference in all group matches;
4. Superior ratio of goals in all group matches, resulting from the number of goals scored divided by the number of goals conceded;
5. Higher number of goals scored in all group matches;
6. If only two teams had the same number of points, and they were tied according to criteria 1 to 5 after having met in the last round of the group stage, their rankings were determined by a direct free kick shoot-out (not used if more than two teams had the same number of points, or if their rankings were not relevant for qualification for the next stage).

All times are Portugal Summer Time (UTC+01:00).

=== Group A ===
Team	Pld	W	D	L	GF	GA	GD	Pts
Italy	3	2	1	0	21	3	+18	7
France	3	2	1	0	7	4	+3	7
Germany	3	1	0	2	5	15	–10	3
England	3	0	0	3	2	13	–11	0

11 July 2016
15:00

Germany	2 – 3	France
L. Karschau 33', 39'	Report	C. Di Benedetto 5', 5'; David 37'

Pavilhão Dr. Salvador Machado, Oliveira de Azeméis
Referee: Francisco Garcia, Óscar Valverde (Spain)

11 July 2016
17:00

England	1 – 8	Italy
Mount 30'	Report	Ambrosio 2', 12', 39'; Compagno 17'; Verona 23', 27'; Cocco 27'; Malagoli 38'

Pavilhão Dr. Salvador Machado, Oliveira de Azeméis
Referee: Thomas Ullrich (Germany), Roland Eggimann (Switzerland)

12 July 2016
16:00

France	2 – 0	England
David 7', 26'	Report

Pavilhão Dr. Salvador Machado, Oliveira de Azeméis
Referee: Rui Torres, Paulo Rainha (Portugal)

12 July 2016
18:00

Italy	11 – 0	Germany
Ambrosio 2', 18', 26'; Verona 13', 15'; Cocco 19'; Compagno 28'; Amato 29', 30'; Pagnini 38', 39'	Report

Pavilhão Dr. Salvador Machado, Oliveira de Azeméis
Referee: Derek Bell (England), Xavier Jacquart (France)

13 July 2016
16:00

Germany	3 – 1	England
Nusch 5'; Fonseca 18'; Pereira 27'	Report	Stewart 26'

Pavilhão Dr. Salvador Machado, Oliveira de Azeméis
Referee: Matteo Galoppi, Franco Ferrari (Italy)

13 July 2016
18:00

Italy	2 – 2	France
Verona 7', 18'	Report	C. Di Benedetto 15', 20'

Pavilhão Dr. Salvador Machado, Oliveira de Azeméis
Referee: Paulo Rainha, Rui Torres (Portugal)

=== Group B ===
Team	Pld	W	D	L	GF	GA	GD	Pts
Portugal	3	3	0	0	28	2	+26	9
Spain	3	2	0	1	21	7	+14	6
Switzerland	3	1	0	2	5	17	–12	3
Austria	3	0	0	3	2	30	–28	0

11 July 2016
19:00

Austria	0 – 12	Spain
	Report	J. Bargalló 10', 14', 36'; P. Bargalló 10', 40'; Baliu 12', 28'; Rodríguez 27'; Selva 27'; Bancells 35', 38'; Burgaya 40'

Pavilhão Dr. Salvador Machado, Oliveira de Azeméis
Referee: Paulo Rainha, Rui Torres (Portugal)

11 July 2016
22:00

Portugal	8 – 0	Switzerland
Barreiros 3', 5'; Alves 13', 36'; Rafael 14', 21'; Rafa 19', 38'	Report

Pavilhão Dr. Salvador Machado, Oliveira de Azeméis
Referee: Xavier Jacquart (France), Derek Bell (England)

12 July 2016
20:00

Switzerland	4 – 1	Austria
Garcia 5', 11'; G. Rettenmund 13'; Kissling 18'	Report	Pafant 38'

Pavilhão Dr. Salvador Machado, Oliveira de Azeméis
Referee: Óscar Valverde, Francisco Garcia (Spain)

12 July 2016
22:00

Spain	1 – 6	Portugal
J. Bargalló 6'	Report	Barreiros 5'; Ventura 10'; Rodrigues 21'; Rafa 32'; Rafael 35'; Alves 38'

Pavilhão Dr. Salvador Machado, Oliveira de Azeméis
Referee: Franco Ferrari, Matteo Galoppi (Italy)

13 July 2016
20:00

Spain	8 – 1	Switzerland
J. Bargalló 10', 13', 15'; Bancells 12'; Selva 16'; Baliu 22'; P. Bargalló 35'; Rodríguez 36'	Report	R. Rettenmund 17'

Pavilhão Dr. Salvador Machado, Oliveira de Azeméis
Referee: Xavier Jacquart (France), Derek Bell (England)

13 July 2016
22:00

Portugal	14 – 1	Austria
Rafa 2', 25', 31'; Rafael 7'; Alves 8', 27', 39', 40'; Ventura 10', 19'; Rodrigues 12', 20'; Barreiros 18', 26'	Report	Wolf 37'

Pavilhão Dr. Salvador Machado, Oliveira de Azeméis
Referee: Roland Eggimann (Switzerland), Thomas Ullrich (Germany)

== Knockout stage ==
Quarter-finals
14 July – Oliveira de Azeméis
Italy	12
Austria	1
14 July – Oliveira de Azeméis
Germany	0
Spain	9
14 July – Oliveira de Azeméis
France	1
Switzerland	6
14 July – Oliveira de Azeméis
England	0
Portugal	12

Semi-finals
15 July – Oliveira de Azeméis
Italy	1
Spain	0
15 July – Oliveira de Azeméis
Switzerland	0
Portugal	8

Final
16 July – Oliveira de Azeméis
Italy	2
Portugal	6
Third place
16 July – Oliveira de Azeméis
Spain	7
Switzerland	1

=== Quarterfinals ===
14 July 2016
16:00

France	1 – 6	Switzerland
B. Di Benedetto 38'	Report	Kissling 4', 14', 39', 40'; Wirth 8'; Jimenez 11'

Pavilhão Dr. Salvador Machado, Oliveira de Azeméis
Referee: Franco Ferrari, Matteo Galoppi (Italy)
14 July 2016
18:00

Italy	12 – 1	Austria
Malagoli 2', 4', 32'; Cocco 4'; Compagno 6', 17', 22'; Pagnini 12', 25'; Ambrosio 29'; Illuzzi 33', 35'	Report	Huber 8'

Pavilhão Dr. Salvador Machado, Oliveira de Azeméis
Referee: Thomas Ullrich (Germany), Roland Eggimann (Switzerland)
14 July 2016
20:00

Germany	0 – 9	Spain
	Report	P. Bargalló 3', 13', 39'; Baliu 8'; Rodríguez 9', 11', 32'; Selva 14', 15'

Pavilhão Dr. Salvador Machado, Oliveira de Azeméis
Referee: Derek Bell (England), Xavier Jacquart (France)
14 July 2016
22:00

England	0 – 12	Portugal
	Report	Rodrigues 6', 8', 10', 21', 30'; Barreiros 7', 7', 8'; Rafa 17'; Alves 18'; Rafael 25'; Ventura 30'

Pavilhão Dr. Salvador Machado, Oliveira de Azeméis
Referee: Francisco Garcia, Óscar Valverde (Spain)

=== Fifth to eighth place classification ===
Semi-finals
15 July – Oliveira de Azeméis
Austria	0
Germany	9
15 July – Oliveira de Azeméis
France	5
England	2

Fifth place
16 July – Oliveira de Azeméis
Germany	1 (1)
France (pen.)	1 (2)
Seventh place
16 July – Oliveira de Azeméis
Austria	1
England	6

==== Fifth to eighth place semi-finals ====
15 July 2016
16:00

Austria	0 – 9	Germany
	Report	K. Karschau 17', 38', 40'; Pereira 23', 27'; Milewski 29'; L. Karschau 35', 38'; Nusch 39'

Pavilhão Dr. Salvador Machado, Oliveira de Azeméis
Referee: Matteo Galoppi, Franco Ferrari (Italy)
15 July 2016
18:00

France	5 – 2	England
C. Di Benedetto 29', 33', 37'; David 34', 35'	Report	Mount 11', 35'

Pavilhão Dr. Salvador Machado, Oliveira de Azeméis
Referee: Roland Eggimann (Switzerland), Thomas Ullrich (Germany)

==== Seventh place match ====
16 July 2016
15:00

Austria	1 – 6	England
Pafant 23'	Report	Mount 3'; Stewart 8'; Barker 27', 32', 32', 34'

Pavilhão Dr. Salvador Machado, Oliveira de Azeméis
Referee: Roland Eggimann (Switzerland), Thomas Ullrich (Germany)

==== Fifth place match ====
16 July 2016
17:00

Germany	1 – 1 (a.e.t.)	France
K. Karschau 25'	Report	R. Di Benedetto 23'
Penalties
K. Karschau (penalty missed); Hack (penalty scored); Milewski (penalty missed); L. Karschau (penalty missed); Pereira (penalty missed)	1 – 2	(penalty missed) Herman; (penalty scored) B. Di Benedetto; (penalty scored) Nedder; (penalty missed) C. Di Benedetto

Pavilhão Dr. Salvador Machado, Oliveira de Azeméis
Referee: Franco Ferrari, Matteo Galoppi (Italy)

=== Semi-finals ===
15 July 2016
20:00

Italy	1 – 0	Spain
Ambrosio 5'	Report

Pavilhão Dr. Salvador Machado, Oliveira de Azeméis
Referee: Rui Torres, Paulo Rainha (Portugal)
15 July 2016
22:00

Switzerland	0 – 8	Portugal
	Report	Rodrigues 4', 10', 26', 29'; Alves 16', 35'; Ventura 24'; Barreiros 28'

Pavilhão Dr. Salvador Machado, Oliveira de Azeméis
Referee: Óscar Valverde, Francisco Garcia (Spain)

=== Third place match ===
16 July 2016
19:00

Spain	7 – 1	Switzerland
Mitjans 10', 31'; J. Bargalló 20'; Rodríguez 23'; Bancells 24'; Burgaya 26'; Baliu 31'	Report	Kissling 16'

Pavilhão Dr. Salvador Machado, Oliveira de Azeméis
Referee: Paulo Rainha, Rui Torres (Portugal)

=== Final ===
16 July 2016
21:00

Italy	2 – 6	Portugal
Ambrosio 3', 4'	Report	Rafael 22', 32'; Ventura 34'; Rafa 37'; Rodrigues 38'; Nunes 38'

Pavilhão Dr. Salvador Machado, Oliveira de Azeméis
Referee: Francisco Garcia, Óscar Valverde (Spain)

== Final ranking ==
Rank	Team
1st place, gold medalist(s)	Portugal
2nd place, silver medalist(s)	Italy
3rd place, bronze medalist(s)	Spain
4	Switzerland
5	France
6	Germany
7	England
8	Austria
