= Reinaldo Ventura =

Portuguese roller hockey player (born 1978)

Personal information
- Full name: Reinaldo Miguel Silva Ventura
- Nickname: Rei (King)
- Nationality: Portuguese
- Born: 16 May 1978 (age 48) Vila Nova de Gaia, Portugal
- Years active: 1995–
- Height: 1.78 m (5 ft 10 in)
- Weight: 90 kg (198 lb)

Sport
- Country: Portugal
- Sport: Roller hockey
- Team: (Portugal) FC Porto (1995–2015) (Portugal) OC Barcelos (2015–2017) (Italy) Viareggio (2017–2019) (Italy) Trissino (2019-2020) (Portugal) OC Barcelos (2020-)
Medal record
Representing Portugal
FIRS World Cup
Gold medal – first place	2003 Oliveira de Azeméis	Team
Bronze medal – third place	2005 San Jose	Team
Bronze medal – third place	2009 Vigo	Team
Bronze medal – third place	2011 San Juan	Team
Silver medal – second place	2017 Nanjing	Team
CERH European Championship
Silver medal – second place	2000 Wimmis	Team
Silver medal – second place	2002 Florence	Team
Bronze medal – third place	2004 La Roche-sur-Yon	Team
Bronze medal – third place	2006 Monza	Team
Silver medal – second place	2008 Oviedo	Team
Silver medal – second place	2010 Wuppertal	Team
Silver medal – second place	2012 Paredes	Team
Gold medal – first place	2016 Oliveira de Azeméis	Team
Montreux Nations Cup
Silver medal – second place	2001 Nations Cup	Team
Silver medal – second place	2003 Nations Cup	Team
Gold medal – first place	2009 Nations Cup	Team
Gold medal – first place	2011 Nations Cup	Team
World Games
Gold medal – first place	2001 Akita	Team

Reinaldo Miguel Silva Ventura (born 16 May 1978 in Vila Nova de Gaia) is a Portuguese roller hockey player. Renowned as a prolific goalscorer with a strong middle-distance shot, he is capable of occupying both the midfielder or the forward position in a roller rink surface. Ventura was a leading name for FC Porto, winning a combined total of 31 national titles and 1 CERS Cup during his 26 years spell with the club.

From 1997 to 2012 he was a main player in the Portugal national roller hockey team. He was a member of the squad that won the Rink Hockey World Championship, in 2003. Ventura was the captain at the 2008 Rink Hockey European Championship, where Portugal was runners-up. He was again the captain at the 2009 Rink Hockey World Championship, winning this time the 3rd place, and at the 2010 Rink Hockey European Championship, lost to Spain in the final by 8–2. He left the National Team after the 2012 CERH European Championship. He came back to the national team in 2016, joining the team that won the 2016 CERH European Championship.

== Honours ==
=== Club ===
FC Porto

- Portuguese First Division: 1998–99, 1999–00, 2001–02, 2002–03, 2003–04, 2004–05, 2005–06, 2006–07, 2007–08, 2008–09, 2009–10, 2010–11, 2012–13
- Portuguese Cup: 1995–96, 1997–98, 1998–99, 2004–05, 2005–06, 2007–08, 2008–09, 2012–13
- Portuguese Supercup: 1996, 1998, 2000, 2005, 2006, 2007, 2008, 2009, 2011, 2013
- CERS Cup: 1995–96

OC Barcelos

- CERS Cup: 2015–16, 2016–17

=== International ===
Portugal

- FIRS World Cup: 2003
- CERH European Championship: 2016
- Montreux Nations Cup: 2009, 2011
- World Games: 2001
