= 64th Nations Cup =

2011 64th Nations Cup
Montreux Tournament

Tournament details
- Host country: Switzerland
- Dates: 20–24 April
- Teams: 8 (from 4 confederations)

Final positions
- Champions: Portugal (16th title)
- Runners-up: Spain
- Third place: Argentina
- Fourth place: Angola

Tournament statistics
- Matches played: 24
- Top scorer: (Angola) João Vieira

The 64th Nations Cup was the 2011 edition of the Nations Cup. The competition was hosted as normal in Montreux from April 20 to 24, 2011.

== Group stage ==
=== Group A ===
Team	Pld	W	D	L	GF	GA	Pts
Portugal	3	3	0	0	19	3	9
Spain	3	2	0	1	14	6	6
(Switzerland) Montreux HC	3	1	0	2	8	15	3
Germany	3	0	0	3	4	21	0

April 20, 2011; 20:30 CET
April 20, 2011; 20:30 CET	Portugal	10-1	Germany	Le Pierrier - Clarens, Montreux
April 20, 2011; 20:30 CET	Vítor Hugo (5); André Azevedo; Ricardo Barreiros; Ricardo Oliveira; João Rofrigues		Thomas Haupt	Le Pierrier - Clarens, Montreux

April 20, 2011; 22:00 CET
April 20, 2011; 22:00 CET	Spain	6-3	(Switzerland) Montreux HC	Le Pierrier - Clarens, Montreux

April 21, 2011; 20:30 CET
April 21, 2011; 20:30 CET	Portugal	6-1	(Switzerland) Montreux HC	Le Pierrier - Clarens, Montreux

April 21, 2011; 22:00 CET
April 21, 2011; 22:00 CET	Spain	7-0	Germany	Le Pierrier - Clarens, Montreux

April 22, 2011; 20:30 CET
April 22, 2011; 20:30 CET	Spain	1-3	Portugal	Le Pierrier - Clarens, Montreux

April 22, 2011; 22:00 CET
April 22, 2011; 22:00 CET	Germany	3-4	(Switzerland) Montreux HC	Le Pierrier - Clarens, Montreux

=== Group B ===
Team	Pld	W	D	L	GF	GA	Pts
Argentina	3	3	0	0	39	9	9
Angola	3	1	1	1	39	14	4
France	3	1	1	1	27	9	4
Macau	3	0	0	3	6	79	0

April 20, 2011; 17:30 CET
April 20, 2011; 17:30 CET	France	21-1	Macau	Le Pierrier - Clarens, Montreux

April 20, 2011; 19:00 CET
April 20, 2011; 19:00 CET	Argentina	7-5	Angola	Le Pierrier - Clarens, Montreux

April 21, 2011; 17:30 CET
April 21, 2011; 17:30 CET	France	4-4	Angola	Le Pierrier - Clarens, Montreux

April 21, 2011; 22:00 CET
April 21, 2011; 22:00 CET	Argentina	28-2	Macau	Le Pierrier - Clarens, Montreux

April 22, 2011; 17:30 CET
April 22, 2011; 17:30 CET	Angola	30-3	Macau	Le Pierrier - Clarens, Montreux

April 23, 2011; 22:00 CET
April 23, 2011; 22:00 CET	Argentina	4-2	France	Le Pierrier - Clarens, Montreux

=== Semifinals ===
April 23, 2011; 20:30 CET
April 23, 2011; 20:30 CET	Portugal	6-2	Angola	Le Pierrier - Clarens, Montreux

April 23, 2011; 22:00 CET
April 23, 2011; 22:00 CET	Argentina	1-2	Spain	Le Pierrier - Clarens, Montreux

=== Final ===
April 24, 2011; 22:00 CET
April 24, 2011; 22:00 CET	Portugal	2-1	Spain	Le Pierrier - Clarens, Montreux

== Final ranking ==
Plc	Team
1	Portugal
2	Spain
3	Argentina
4	Angola
5	France
6	(Switzerland) Montreux HC
7	Germany
8	Macau
