= 2010 Rink Hockey European Championship =

CERH Euro 2010
2010 Rink Hockey European Championship Rollhockey-Europameisterschaft 2010

Tournament details
- Host country: Germany
- Dates: 5 September – 11 September
- Teams: 8
- Venue: 1 (in 1 host city)

Final positions
- Champions: Spain (15th title)
- Runners-up: Portugal
- Third place: France
- Fourth place: Germany

Tournament statistics
- Matches played: 24
- Goals scored: 193 (8.04 per match)
- Top scorer: (Portugal) Ricardo Oliveira (14)

The 2010 Rink Hockey European Championship or 2010 CERH European Championship was the 49th edition of the Rink Hockey European Championship, held between 5 and 11 September, in Wuppertal, Germany.

== Venue ==
All games were played at Wuppertal's Uni-Halle, with a maximum capacity of 2,500 for rink hockey games.

== Group stage ==
All times are Central European Summer Time (UTC+1).

=== Group A ===
| Team | Pld | W | D | L | GF | GA | GD | Pts |
|---|---|---|---|---|---|---|---|---|
| Spain | 3 | 3 | 0 | 0 | 27 | 0 | +27 | 9 |
| Switzerland | 3 | 2 | 0 | 1 | 13 | 9 | +4 | 6 |
| France | 3 | 1 | 0 | 2 | 9 | 13 | -4 | 3 |
| Austria | 3 | 0 | 0 | 3 | 1 | 28 | -27 | 0 |

| 6 September 2010; 17:30 | France | 0 – 8 | Switzerland | Uni-Halle, Wuppertal |

Goals / Kissling (4); Münger (2); Wirth von Allmen

| 6 September 2010; 19:15 | Spain | 14 – 0 | Austria | Uni-Halle, Wuppertal |

Ma Ordeig (4) Gil (3); Bargalló (2); Torra (2); Gual; Ma Roca Adroher Goals

| 7 September 2010; 15:45 | Switzerland | 5 – 1 | Austria | Uni-Halle, Wuppertal |

Kissling (3); Wirth von Allmen / Goals / Simcic

| 7 September 2010; 17:30 | Spain | 5 – 0 | France | Uni-Halle, Wuppertal |

Gil (2); Bargalló; Gual; Adroher / Goals

| 8 September 2010; 15:45 | France | 9 – 0 | Austria | Uni-Halle, Wuppertal |

Henry (3); K. Guilbert (3); Sébastien; Lesca; N. Guilbert / Goals

| 8 September 2010; 17:30 | Spain | 8 – 0 | Switzerland | Uni-Halle, Wuppertal |

Torra (3); Bargalló (2); Gil; Gual; Adroher / Goals

=== Group B ===
| Team | Pld | W | D | L | GF | GA | GD | Pts |
|---|---|---|---|---|---|---|---|---|
| Portugal | 3 | 3 | 0 | 0 | 23 | 3 | +20 | 9 |
| Italy | 3 | 1 | 1 | 1 | 9 | 9 | ±0 | 4 |
| Germany | 3 | 1 | 1 | 1 | 10 | 11 | -1 | 4 |
| England | 3 | 0 | 0 | 3 | 6 | 25 | -19 | 0 |

| 5 September 2010; 20:00 | Germany | 6 – 3 | England | Uni-Halle, Wuppertal; Attendance: 2,100 |

Behrendt (3); Bernadowitz (3) / Goals / Stewart; Waddingham; Hosking

| 6 September 2010; 21:00 | Portugal | 4 – 1 | Italy | Uni-Halle, Wuppertal |

Ventura (3); Barreiros / Goals / Travasino

| 7 September 2010; 19:15 | England | 1 – 14 | Portugal | Uni-Halle, Wuppertal |

Smith / Goals / Oliveira (6); Viana (2); Moreira (2); Barreiros; Ventura; Rafael; Azevedo

| 7 September 2010; 21:00 | Germany | 3 – 3 | Italy | Uni-Halle, Wuppertal |

Wochnik; Bernadowitz; Behrendt / Goals / Festa; Travasino; Motaran

| 8 September 2010; 19:15 | Italy | 5 – 2 | England | Uni-Halle, Wuppertal |

de Rinaldis (2); Travasino (2); Serpini / Goals / Taylor (2)

| 8 September 2010; 21:00 | Germany | 1 – 5 | Portugal | Uni-Halle, Wuppertal |

Hövelmann / Goals / Oliveira (2); Neves; Viana; Barreiros

== Knockout stage ==
All times are Central European Summer Time (UTC+1).

Quarter-finals
9 September — 17:00 (Match 14)
Spain | 11
England | 1
9 September — 19:00 (Match 15)
France | 3
Italy | 2
9 September — 15:00 (Match 13)
Switzerland | 0
Germany | 2
9 September — 21:00 (Match 16)
Austria | 0
Portugal | 23

Semi-finals
10 September — 19:00 (Match 19)
Spain | 4
France | 0
10 September — 21:00 (Match 20)
Germany | 1
Portugal | 6

Final
11 September — 21:00 (Match 24)
Spain | 8
Portugal | 2
Third place
11 September — 19:00 (Match 23)
France | 1 (2)
Germany | 1 (0)

=== Quarter-finals ===
| 9 September 2010; 15:00 | Switzerland | 0 – 2 | Germany | Uni-Halle, Wuppertal |

Goals / Wochnik; Paczia

| 9 September 2010; 17:00 | Spain | 11 – 1 | England | Uni-Halle, Wuppertal |

Gil (3); Adroher (2); Ma Roca (2); Bargalló; Ma Ordeig; Torra; Bancells / Goals / Hosking

| 9 September 2010; 19:00 | France | 3 – 2 (aet) | Italy | Uni-Halle, Wuppertal |

Weber (3) / Goals / Motaran; Festa

| 9 September 2010; 21:00 | Austria | 0 – 23 | Portugal | Uni-Halle, Wuppertal |

Goals / Viana (6); Ventura (4); Rafael (3); Oliveira (3); Moreira (2); Azevedo (2); Barreiros (2); Neves

=== Semi-finals ===
| 10 September 2010; 19:00 | Spain | 4 – 0 | France | Uni-Halle, Wuppertal |

Bargalló (2); Ma Ordeig; Torra / Goals

| 10 September 2010; 21:00 | Germany | 1 – 6 | Portugal | Uni-Halle, Wuppertal |

Behrendt / Goals / Oliveira (3); Viana (2); Ventura

=== Third-place play-off ===
| 11 September 2010; 19:00 | France | 1 – 1 (aet) | Germany | Uni-Halle, Wuppertal |

Sébastien / Goals / Behrendt

France win 2-0 on penalties

=== Final ===
| 11 September 2010; 21:00 | Spain | 8 – 2 | Portugal | Uni-Halle, Wuppertal |

Gil (2); Ma Ordeig (2); Bargalló (2); Torra; Adroher / Goals / Barreiros; Azevedo

== Placement matches ==
All times are Central European Summer Time (UTC+1).

Eliminatory
10 September — 15:00 (Match 17)
England | 3
Italy | 5
10 September — 17:00 (Match 18)
Switzerland | 4
Austria | 1

5th place
11 September — 17:00 (Match 22)
Italy | 4
Switzerland | 2
7th place
11 September — 15:00 (Match 21)
England | 8
Austria | 3

=== 5th to 8th place ===
| 10 September 2010; 15:00 | England | 3 – 5 | Italy | Uni-Halle, Wuppertal |

Taylor (2); Waddingham / Goals / Festa (2) de Rinaldis; Dagostino; Travasino

| 10 September 2010; 17:00 | Switzerland | 4 – 1 | Austria | Uni-Halle, Wuppertal |

von Allmen; Kissling; Münger; Wirth / Goals / Schwendinger

=== 7th-place play-off ===
| 11 September 2010; 15:00 | England | 8 – 3 | Austria | Uni-Halle, Wuppertal |

Barker (2); Waddingham (2); Stewart (2); Hosking; Taylor / Goals / Witzemann (3)

=== 5th-place play-off ===
| 11 September 2010; 17:00 | Italy | 4 – 2 | Switzerland | Uni-Halle, Wuppertal |

Motaran (2); Illuzzi de Rinaldis / Goals / Münger; Wirth

== Final ranking ==
| Plc | Team | Pld | W | D | L | GF | GA | Diff |
|---|---|---|---|---|---|---|---|---|
| 1 | Spain | 6 | 6 | 0 | 0 | 50 | 3 | +47 |
| 2 | Portugal | 6 | 5 | 0 | 1 | 54 | 12 | +42 |
| 3 | France | 6 | 2 | 1 | 3 | 13 | 20 | -7 |
| 4 | Germany | 6 | 2 | 2 | 2 | 14 | 18 | -4 |
| 5 | Italy | 6 | 3 | 1 | 2 | 20 | 17 | +3 |
| 6 | Switzerland | 6 | 3 | 0 | 3 | 19 | 16 | +3 |
| 7 | England | 6 | 1 | 0 | 5 | 18 | 44 | −26 |
| 8 | Austria | 6 | 0 | 0 | 6 | 5 | 63 | −58 |

2010 Rink Hockey European Championship
Spain
Fifteenth Title

== Goalscorers ==
Below is a list of all of the tournament's goalscorers:

14 goals

- (Portugal) Ricardo Oliveira

11 goals

- (Portugal) Luís Viana
- (Spain) Pedro Gil

10 goals

- (Spain) Jordi Bargalló

9 goals

- (Portugal) Reinaldo Ventura

8 goals

- (Spain) Josep Ma Ordeig
- (Spain) Marc Torra
- (Switzerland) Pascal Kissling

6 goals

- (Germany) Jens Behrendt
- (Portugal) Ricardo Barreiros
- (Spain) Jordi Adroher

5 goals

- (Italy) Juan Travasino
- (England) James Taylor

4 goals

- (Germany) Marco Bernadowitz
- (Italy) Sergio Festa
- (Italy) Davide Motaran
- (Italy) Francesco de Rinaldis
- (Portugal) Tiago Rafael
- (Portugal) Pedro Moreira
- (Portugal) Andre Azevedo
- (England) Marc Waddingham
- (Switzerland) Andreas Münger
- (Switzerland) Dominik Wirth

3 goals

- (France) Guirec Henry
- (France) Kevin Guilbert
- (France) Anthony Weber
- (Spain) Marc Gual
- (Spain) Josep Ma Roca
- (Switzerland) Simon von Allmen
- (England) Simon Hosking
- (England) Owen Stewart
- (Austria) Michael Witzemann

2 goals

- (Germany) Mark Wochnik
- (Portugal) Valter Neves
- (England) Brandan Barker
- (France) Sébastien

1 goal

- (Austria) Thomas Simcic
- (Austria) Michael Schwendinger
- (England) Karl Smith
- (Germany) Kai Hövelmann
- (Germany) Andreas Paczia
- (Italy) Luca Serpini
- (Italy) Antonio Dagostino
- (Italy) Domenico Illuzzi
- (France) Olivier Lesca
- (France) Nicolas Guilbert
- (Spain) Roma Bancells
