= 65th Nations Cup =

2013 65th Nations Cup
Montreux Tournament

Tournament details
- Host country: Switzerland
- Dates: 27–31 March
- Teams: 8 (from 4 confederations)

Final positions
- Champions: Portugal (17th title)
- Runners-up: Spain
- Third place: Angola
- Fourth place: Germany

Tournament statistics
- Matches played: 20
- Goals scored: 155 (7.75 per match)
- Top scorer(s): (Portugal) Jorge Silva

The 65th Nations Cup in roller hockey was the 2013 edition of the Nations Cup. The competition was hosted as normal in Montreux from 27 to 31 March 2013. Portugal won its 17th trophy, the third consecutive and the respective Marcel Monney Award.

== Group stage ==
=== Group A ===
Team	Pld	W	D	L	GF	GA	GD	Pts
Angola	3	3	0	0	11	5	6	9
Germany	3	1	1	1	7	8	-1	4
France	3	0	2	1	5	8	-3	2
Switzerland	3	0	1	2	8	10	-2	1

March 27, 2013; 17:30 CET
March 27, 2013; 17:30 CET	France	1 – 1	Switzerland	Le Pierrier - Clarens, Montreux

March 27, 2013; 19:00 CET
March 27, 2013; 19:00 CET	Germany	0 – 2	Angola	Le Pierrier - Clarens, Montreux

March 28, 2013; 17:30 CET
March 28, 2013; 17:30 CET	Angola	4 – 1	France	Le Pierrier - Clarens, Montreux

March 28, 2013; 22:00 CET
March 28, 2013; 22:00 CET	Germany	4 – 3	Switzerland	Le Pierrier - Clarens, Montreux

March 29, 2013; 19:00 CET
March 29, 2013; 19:00 CET	Angola	5 – 4	Switzerland	Le Pierrier - Clarens, Montreux

March 29, 2013; 20:00 CET
March 29, 2013; 20:00 CET	Germany	3 – 3	France	Le Pierrier - Clarens, Montreux

=== Group B ===
Team	Pld	W	D	L	GF	GA	GD	Pts
Spain	3	3	0	0	16	7	9	9
Portugal	3	2	0	1	27	8	19	6
Brazil	3	1	0	2	7	23	-16	3
(Switzerland) Montreux HC	3	0	0	3	3	15	-12	0

March 27, 2013; 20:30 CET
March 27, 2013; 20:30 CET	Portugal	7 – 1	(Switzerland) Montreux HC	Le Pierrier - Clarens, Montreux

March 27, 2013; 22:00 CET
March 27, 2013; 22:00 CET	Spain	7 – 1	Brazil	Le Pierrier - Clarens, Montreux

March 28, 2013; 19:00 CET
March 28, 2013; 19:00 CET	Spain	4 – 2	(Switzerland) Montreux HC	Le Pierrier - Clarens, Montreux

March 28, 2013; 20:30 CET
March 28, 2013; 20:30 CET	Portugal	16 – 2	Brazil	Le Pierrier - Clarens, Montreux

March 29, 2013; 17:30 CET
March 29, 2013; 17:30 CET	Brazil	4 – 0	(Switzerland) Montreux HC	Le Pierrier - Clarens, Montreux

March 29, 2013; 20:30 CET
March 29, 2013; 20:30 CET	Spain	5 – 4	Portugal	Le Pierrier - Clarens, Montreux

== Final Phase ==
=== 5th-8th places ===
Semi-finals
30 March -
Switzerland	3
Brazil	5
30 March -
France	4
(Switzerland) Montreux HC	2

Final
31 March -
Brazil	1
France	8
Third place
31 March -
Switzerland	3
(Switzerland) Montreux HC	4

=== Champion ===
Semi-finals
30 March -
Angola	1
Portugal	7
30 March -
Germany	5
Spain	9

Final
31 March -
Portugal	4(5)G
Spain	4(4)P
Third place
31 March -
Angola	6
Germany	3

=== Semifinals ===
March 30, 2013; 18:00 CET
March 30, 2013; 18:00 CET	Angola	1-7	Portugal	Le Pierrier - Clarens, Montreux

March 30, 2013; 20:00 CET
March 30, 2013; 20:00 CET	Germany	5-9	Spain	Le Pierrier - Clarens, Montreux

=== Final ===
March 31, 2013
20:00 CET

Portugal	4-4 (a.e.t.)	Spain
1-1 Ricardo oliveira "Caio"; 2-2 Ricardo Barreiros; 3-2 Ricardo Barreiros; 4-4 Ricardo oliveira "Caio		0-1 Tony Perez; 1-2 Marc Olle; 3-3 Enric Torner; 4-3 Enric Torner
Penalties
Ricardo Oliveira "Caio" (penalty missed); Ricardo Barreiros (penalty missed); Helder Nunes (penalty missed); Joao Rodrigues (penalty missed); Gonçalo Alves (penalty scored)	1-0	(penalty missed) Tony Perez; (penalty missed) Cristian Rodrigues; (penalty missed) Xavier Barroso; (penalty missed) P. Bargallo; (penalty missed) Enric Torner

Le Pierrier - Clarens, Montreux

== Final ranking ==
Lugar	Seleção
Gold medal	Portugal
Silver medal	Spain
Bronze medal	Angola
4	Germany
5	France
6	Brazil
7	(Switzerland) Montreux HC
8	Switzerland

Winners 2013 Nations Cup
PORTUGAL
17º
