= 2008 Rink Hockey European Championship =

Campeonato de Europa de Hockey sobre Patines, Oviedo 2008

Tournament details
- Host country: Spain
- Dates: July 21–26, 2008
- Teams: 8
- Venue: 1 (in 1 host city)

Final positions
- Champions: Spain (14th title)
- Runners-up: Portugal
- Third place: Italy
- Fourth place: France

Tournament statistics
- Matches played: 24
- Goals scored: 138 (5.75 per match)
- Top scorer: (Portugal) Ricardo Barreiros (10)

The 2008 Rink Hockey European Championship was the 48th edition of the Rink Hockey European Championship—the biennial rink hockey competition for European national teams, supervised by CERH—that took place in the Spanish city of Oviedo, at the local arena Palacio de los Deportes (English: Sports Palace), on July 21–26, 2008. In a final against long-time rivals, Portugal, the hosts and holders Spain won their fifth consecutive European title.

== Format ==
The tournament consists of two distinct phases: a single round-robin group phase and a knockout phase. In the first phase, the eight finalist teams are divided into two groups of four teams. Within each group, every team plays one match against all the other teams, to decide the group classification. Unlike previous editions, all participating teams advance to the quarterfinals phase, whatever their final placing in the group phase. In the quarterfinals, each group winner and the runner-up teams will play the third and fourth placed teams of the other group, respectively, for a place in the semifinals. The four losing teams will play one last game to decide their final ranking in the tournament. The quarterfinal winning sides progress to the semifinals and the two winners meet in the title-awarding final. A game deciding the third and fourth place will be held between the semifinal losing sides.

== Group phase ==
The group phase was contested on July 21–23, with two matches per group, each day. Group A was composed by France, Italy, Netherlands and hosts Spain; Group B included Germany, England, Portugal and Switzerland.

=== Group A ===
Team	Pld	W	D	L	GF	GA	Pts
Spain	3	3	0	0	17	3	9
Italy	3	2	0	1	6	4	6
France	3	1	0	2	11	8	3
Netherlands	3	0	0	3	1	20	0

July 21, 2008; 16:30 CET
July 21, 2008; 16:30 CET	Italy	2–0	France	Palacio de los Deportes, Oviedo
July 21, 2008; 16:30 CET	Juan Travasino; Mattia Cocco	Report		Palacio de los Deportes, Oviedo
	Umpires: Jordi Vidal (ESP) & Joaquim Carpelho (POR)

July 21, 2008; 20:50 CET
July 21, 2008; 20:50 CET	Spain	7–1	Netherlands	Palacio de los Deportes, Oviedo
July 21, 2008; 20:50 CET	Jordi Bargallo (2); Sergi Panadero; Josep Ordeig; Marc Torra; Marc Gual; Pedro Gil	Report	Arjan van Gerven	Palacio de los Deportes, Oviedo
	Umpires: Mark Lewis (SUI) & Thomas Ullrich (GER)

July 22, 2008; 16:30 CET
July 22, 2008; 16:30 CET	Netherlands	0–3	Italy	Palacio de los Deportes, Oviedo
July 22, 2008; 16:30 CET		Report	Juan Travasino; Mattia Cocco; Leonardo Squeo	Palacio de los Deportes, Oviedo
	Umpires: Oscar Valverde (ESP) & Xavier Jacquart (FRA)

July 22, 2008; 20:11 CET
July 22, 2008; 20:11 CET	France	1–6	Spain	Palacio de los Deportes, Oviedo
July 22, 2008; 20:11 CET	Rémi Lasnier	Report	Josep Ordeig (3); Sergi Panadero; Marc Gual; Pedro Gil	Palacio de los Deportes, Oviedo
	Umpires: Massimiliano Carmazzi (ITA) & Thomas Ullrich (GER)

July 23, 2008; 14:51 CET
July 23, 2008; 14:51 CET	Netherlands	0–10	France	Palacio de los Deportes, Oviedo
July 23, 2008; 14:51 CET		Report	Sébastien Landrin (5); Frédéric Hamon (2); Rémi Lasnier; Olivier Lesca; Nicolas Guilbert	Palacio de los Deportes, Oviedo
	Umpires: Mark Lewis (SUI) & Thomas Ullrich (GER)

July 23, 2008; 20:12 CET
July 23, 2008; 20:12 CET	Spain	4–1	Italy	Palacio de los Deportes, Oviedo
July 23, 2008; 20:12 CET	Lluis Teixido (2); Marc Gual (2)	Report	Juan Travasino	Palacio de los Deportes, Oviedo
	Umpires: Joaquim Carpelho (POR) & Xavier Jacquart (FRA)

== Knockout phase ==
Quarter-finals
July 24 — 17:30 CET (Match 16)
England	0
Italy	5
July 24 — 19:00 CET (Match 17)
Netherlands	1
Portugal	10
July 24 — 21:00 CET (Match 18)
Spain	9
Germany	1
July 24 — 15:45 CET (Match 15)
Switzerland	2
France	3

Semi-finals
July 25 — 18:30 CET (Match 19)
Italy	0
Portugal	5
July 25 — 21:00 CET (Match 20)
Spain	3
France	0

Final
July 26 — 21:00 CET (Match 22)
Portugal	0
Spain	1
Third place
July 26 — 18:30 CET (Match 21)
Italy	4
France	3

== Final ranking ==
Plc	Team	Pld	W	D	L	GF	GA	Diff
1	Spain	6	6	0	0	30	4	+26
2	Portugal	6	5	0	1	32	6	+26
3	Italy	6	4	0	2	15	12	+3
4	France	6	2	0	4	17	17	0
5	Switzerland	6	3	1	2	15	16	−1
6	England	6	1	2	3	9	16	−7
7	Germany	6	1	1	4	16	21	−5
8	Netherlands	6	0	0	6	4	46	−42

== Goalscorers ==
Below is a list of all the tournament goalscorers by decreasing number of goals scored:

10 goals

- (Portugal) Ricardo Barreiros

7 goals

- (Spain) Marc Gual
- (France) Sébastien Landrin

6 goals

- (Germany) Jens Behrendt
- (Spain) Pedro Gil
- (Spain) Josep Ordeig

5 goals

- (Germany) Mark Wochnik
- (Italy) Mattia Cocco
- (Italy) Juan Travasino
- (Portugal) Ricardo Oliveira

4 goals

- (Spain) Jordi Bargallo
- (Portugal) Valter Neves

3 goals

- (Switzerland) Gael Jimenez
- (Switzerland) Matthieu Infante
- (Portugal) Reinaldo Ventura
- (Portugal) Ricardo Pereira
- (Spain) Sergi Panadero
- (Switzerland) Federico Mendez
- (England) Marc Waddingham
- (Portugal) Luis Viana
- (Portugal) Tiago Rafael
- (Switzerland) Andreas Muenger
- (Spain) Lluis Teixido

2 goals

- (Switzerland) Dominic Wirth
- (Netherlands) Arjan van Gerven
- (Italy) Leonardo Squeo
- (Germany) Felix Bender
- (France) Rémi Lasnier
- (France) Nicolas Guilbert
- (France) Frédéric Hamon
- (France) Guirec Henry
- (Italy) Domenico Illuzzi
- (England) John Jones

1 goal

- (Portugal) Pedro Moreira
- (Spain) Marc Torra
- (England) Michael Ableson
- (Switzerland) Simon von Allmen
- (France) Olivier Lesca
- (Italy) Diego Nicoletti
- (Netherlands) Robbie van Dooren
- (England) James Taylor
- (England) Mark Rutland
- (England) Russell Lloyd
- (Germany) Dominic Brandt
- (Netherlands) Michael van Gemert
- (Germany) Thomas Haupt
- (Germany) Max Bros
- (France) Igor Tarassioux

== Squads ==
=== Spain ===
N	Name	Birthdate	Position	Club
1	Sergi Fernández	1985	GK	CP Vic
2	Sergi Panadero	1985	D/M	FC Barcelona
3	Josep Maria Ordeig	1981	D/M	FC Barcelona
4	Marc Torra	1984	F	CP Vic
5	Josep Maria Roca	1981	D/M	CP Vic
6	Jordi Bargalló	1979	F	Igualada HC
7	Lluís Teixidó	1978	D/M	FC Barcelona
8	Marc Gual	1980	D/M	Reus Deportiu
9	Pedro Gil	1980	F	Reus Deportiu
10	Guillem Trabal	1979	GK	Reus Deportiu
Coach	Carlos Feriche			

=== Portugal ===
N	Name	Birthdate	Position	Club
1	João Miguel	1973	GK	Porto Santo, SAD
2	Valter Neves	1983	D/M	SL Benfica
3	Ricardo Pereira	1978	F	Bassano (ITA)
4	Tiago Rafael	1983	D/M	OK Barcelos
5	Reinaldo Ventura (C)	1978	D/M	FC Porto
6	Pedro Moreira	1985	D/M	FC Porto
7	Ricardo Barreiros	1982	F	SL Benfica
8	Ricardo Oliveira	1982	F	FC Porto
9	Luís Viana	1976	F	Bassano (ITA)
10	Ricardo Silva	1983	GK	Juventude Viana
Coach	Luís Sénica			

=== France ===
N	Name	Birthdate	Position	Club
1	Nicolas Guillen	1982	GK	SCRA St Omer
2	Rémi Lasnier	1987		US COUTRAS
3	Olivier Lesca	1987		SA Merignac
4	Henry Guirec	1978		SCRA St Omer
5	Jérôme Moriceau	1979		La Roche-sur-Yon
6	Frédéric Hamon	1977		HC Quevert
7	Sébastian Landrin (C)	1979		HC Quevert
8	Nicolas Guilbert	1985		SCRA St Omer
9	Igor Tarassioux	1977		Vaulx en Velin
10	Olivier Gelebart	1975	GK	HC Quevert
Coach	Fabien Savreux			
