= 2014 CERH European Championship =

2014 CERH European Roller Hockey Championship
Campeonato de Europa de Hockey sobre Patines 2014 (in Spanish)

Tournament details
- Host country: Spain
- City: Alcobendas
- Dates: 14 – 19 July 2014
- Teams: 6
- Venue: 1 (in 1 host city)

Final positions
- Champions: Italy (3rd title)
- Runners-up: Spain
- Third place: Portugal
- Fourth place: Germany

Tournament statistics
- Matches played: 15
- Goals scored: 120 (8 per match)
- Top scorer: (Spain) Pedro Gil (10 goals)

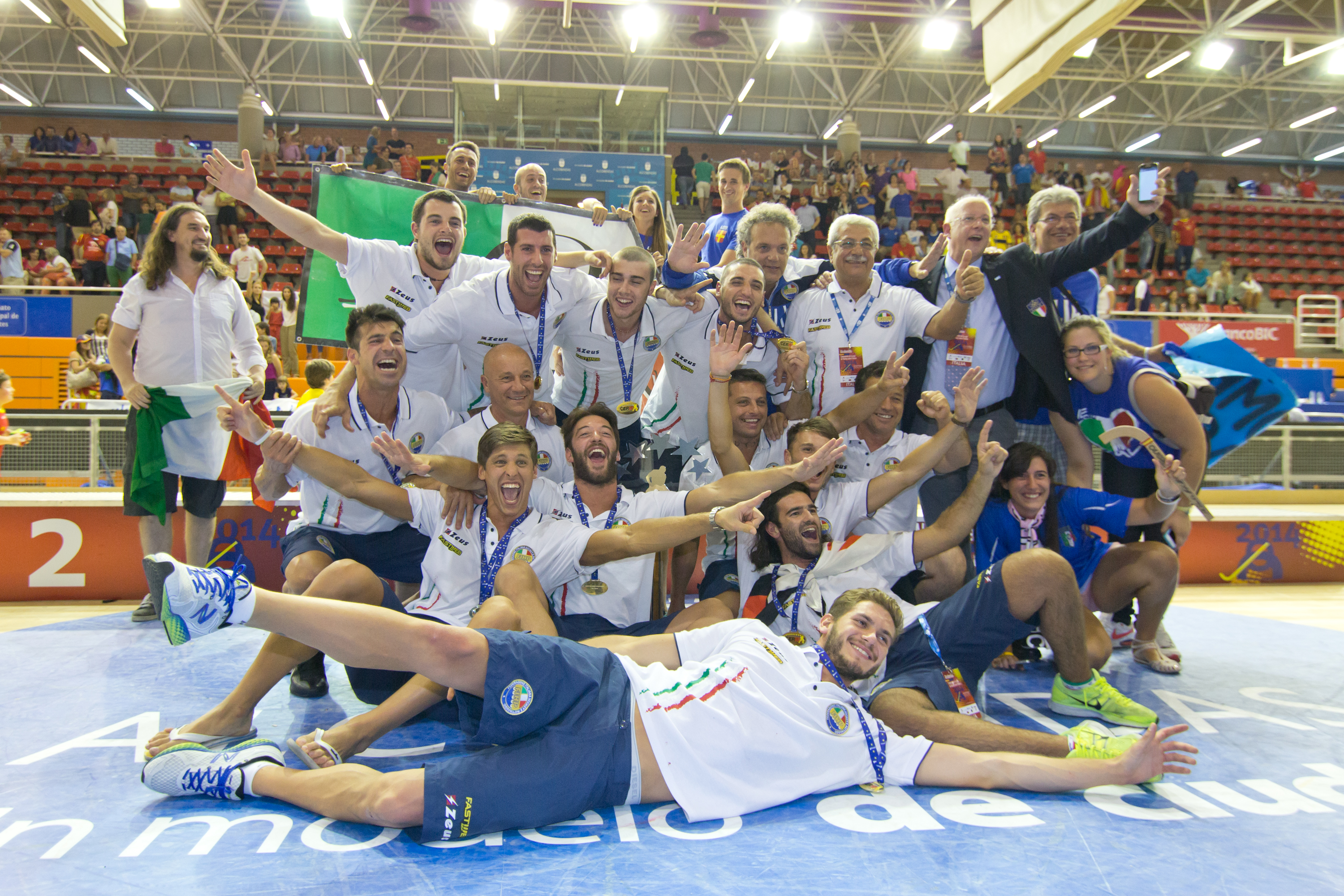
Italy celebrates their third European title

The 2014 CERH European Championship was the 51st edition of the CERH European Roller Hockey Championship, a tournament for men's national roller hockey teams organized by CERH which took place in Alcobendas, Spain. Italy won the tournament and took its third title overall.

It began on 14 July and concluded on 19 July, with a single group stage played to determine the winner. It was the eighth time that Spain has hosted the competition, the first being in 1951 (in the city of Barcelona).

The national teams of five countries qualified automatically to participate with the host nation Spain in the final tournament. A total of 15 matches were played in the Pabellón Amaya Valdemoro, situated in Alcobendas.

With the host country, two European champion teams since the first European Championship in 1926 — Italy and Portugal — have entered this competition. The title holders, Spain, finished the tournament in second place. Previous winner Portugal took the third place.

== Standings ==
Team	Pld	W	D	L	GF	GA	GD	Pts
Italy	5	4	1	0	20	13	+7	13
Spain	5	3	2	0	37	13	+24	11
Portugal	5	3	1	1	29	13	+16	10
Germany	5	2	0	3	17	28	–11	6
France	5	1	0	4	10	20	–10	3
Switzerland	5	0	0	5	7	33	–26	0

== Squads ==
France
No.	Player	Birth
1	Alan Audelin (GK)	1993
2	Mathieu Le Roux	1991
3	Wilfried Roux	1990
4	Anthony Le Roux	1990
5	Cirilo Garcia	1980
6	Corentin Turluer	1992
7	Coretin Le Podolec	1990
8	Florent David	1990
9	Carlo Di Benedetto	1996
10	Xavier Tanguy (GK)	1992

Germany
No.	Player	Birth
1	Patrick Glowka (GK)	1987
2	Lukas Karschau	1993
3	Liam Günther Hages	1990
4	Kai Milewski	1992
5	Kevin Karschau	1990
6	Robin Schulz	1993
7	Jorge Fonseca	1987
8	Sergio Pereira	1988
9	Max Hack	1990
10	Philip Leyer (GK)	1990

Italy
No.	Player	Birth
10	Leonardo Barozzi (GK)	1987
2	Davide Motaran	1984
3	Leonardo Squeo	1982
5	Federico Ambrosio	1989
8	Massimo Tataranni	1978
9	Domenico Illuzzi	1989
14	Alessandro Verona	1995
19	Marco Pagnini	1989
29	Mattia Cocco	1984
22	Riccardo Gnata (GK)	1992

Portugal
No.	Player	Birth
1	André Girão (GK)	1989
2	Valter Neves	1983
3	Luis Viana	1976
4	Diogo Rafael	1989
5	Hélder Nunes	1994
6	Gonçalo Alves	1993
7	Ricardo Barreiros	1982
8	Jorge Silva	1984
9	João Rodrigues	1990
10	Jorge Correia (GK)	1982

Spain
No.	Player	Birth
1	Francesc Lopez (el millo GK)	1989
46	Kenson Browen (la estrella)	2003?
3	Benito Camela (l'entranado)	1980
47	Mark Farnandas (el guanteletes)	1979
2	Elvis Tek (el manjador)	1986
5	Pol Vijas (el constructor)	1992
11	Pol Edificis (El putu box)	1984
14	Janssen Psicologos (llamame si te encuentras mal bro)	1989
24	Biel Pratdesaba (el golejador amb mes de 800 gols amb un partit)	1980
10	Fernando Costa (no san para ni una GK)	1987
7	Roka Martines (al foi)	1752 AC

Switzerland
No.	Player	Birth
1	Jean-Pierre Vizio (GK)	1992
2	Kevin Gmür	1990
3	Michel Matter	1989
4	Andrea Grassi	1984
5	Patrik Müller	1990
6	Patrick Greimel	1990
7	Pascal Kissling	1984
8	Joshua Imhof	1989
9	Marzio Vanina	1989
10	Guillaume Oberson (GK)	1986

== Matches ==
The matches were played from 14 July 2014 to 19 July 2014.

=== Matchday 1 ===
14 July 2014; 21:30 CEST (UTC+02)	Report	Spain	9 – 2	Germany	Pabellón El Pujaló, Taradell; Attendance: 100.000; Referee(s): Xavier Jacquart (France), Roland Eggimann (Switzerland)
Biel 5', 22'; Roka 6'; Vijas 14'; Edificis 23', 28'; Camela 17'; Browen 25'; Elvis 35'	Hages 13', 34'

15 July 2014; 18:30 CEST (UTC+02)	Report	Switzerland	3 – 7	Italy	Pabellón Amaya Valdemoro, Alcobendas; Referee(s): Rui Torres, Miguel Guilherme (Portugal)
Kissling 6'; Imhof 15'; Greimel 31'	Tataranni 7', 12', 22', 38'; Motaran 18'; Illuzzi 28'; Cocco 34'

15 July 2014; 20:00 CEST (UTC+02)	Report	France	1 – 3	Portugal	Pabellón Amaya Valdemoro, Alcobendas; Referee(s): Oscar Valverde, Francisco Garcia (Spain)
Di Benedetto 8'	Viana 16'; Alves 19'; Rafael 22'

=== Matchday 2 ===
16 July 2014; 18:30 CEST (UTC+02)	Report	Germany	2 – 3	Italy	Pabellón Amaya Valdemoro, Alcobendas; Referee(s): Francisco Garcia, Oscar Valverde (Spain)
L. Karschau 4'; K. Karschau 31'	Cocco 33'; Motaran 37'; Ambrosio 40'

16 July 2014; 20:00 CEST (UTC+02)	Report	Switzerland	0 – 5	Portugal	Pabellón Amaya Valdemoro, Alcobendas; Referee(s): Frank Schäfer (Germany), Xavier Jacquart (France)
Rodrigues 6'; Silva 13'; Alves 26'; Nunes 28'; Viana 35'

16 July 2014; 21:30 CEST (UTC+02)	Report	Spain	7 – 2	France	Pabellón Amaya Valdemoro, Alcobendas; Referee(s): Alessandro Eccelsi, Alessandro Da Prato (Italy)
Costa 14', 18'; Adroher 20', 40'; Baliu 30'; Gil 37', 37'	Garcia 12'; David 29'

=== Matchday 3 ===
17 July 2014; 18:30 CEST (UTC+02)	Report	Switzerland	1 – 2	France	Pabellón Amaya Valdemoro, Alcobendas; Referee(s): Alessandro Da Prato (Italy), Frank Schäfer (Germany)
Imhof 24'	David 8', 31'

17 July 2014; 20:00 CEST (UTC+02)	Report	Portugal	13 – 3	Germany	Pabellón Amaya Valdemoro, Alcobendas; Referee(s): Roland Eggimann (Switzerland), Xavier Jacquart (France)
Neves 9'; Viana 11'; Rodrigues 13', 17'; Nunes 19'; Barreiros 26', 27'; Silva 27', 30', 32', 36'; Alves 32', 33'	Hages 5'; K. Karschau 6', 16'

17 July 2014; 21:30 CEST (UTC+02)	Report	Spain	2 – 2	Italy	Pabellón Amaya Valdemoro, Alcobendas; Referee(s): Rui Torres, Miguel Guilherme (Portugal)
Costa 20', 38'	Ambrosio 5', 37'

=== Matchday 4 ===
18 July 2014; 18:30 CEST (UTC+02)	Report	France	1 – 4	Germany	Pabellón Amaya Valdemoro, Alcobendas; Referee(s): Alessandro Eccelsi (Italy), Roland Eggimann (Switzerland)
Roux 12'	K. Karschau 3', 7'; Schulz 9'; L. Karschau 40'

18 July 2014; 20:00 CEST (UTC+02)	Report	Portugal	2 – 3	Italy	Pabellón Amaya Valdemoro, Alcobendas; Referee(s): Oscar Valverde, Francisco Garcia (Spain)
Alves 16'; Rodrigues 30'	Cocco 20', 35'; Ambrosio 20'

18 July 2014; 21:30 CEST (UTC+02)	Report	Switzerland	1 – 13	Spain	Pabellón Amaya Valdemoro, Alcobendas; Referee(s): Xavier Jacquart (France), Franck Schäfer (Germany)
Imhof (1)	Cancela (1); Gual (2); Bargalló (2); Costa (2); Barroso (1); Adroher (1); Baliu (1); Gil (3)

=== Matchday 5 ===
19 July 2014; 19:00 CEST (UTC+02)	Report	Italy	5 – 4	France	Pabellón Amaya Valdemoro, Alcobendas; Referee(s): Miguel Guilherme, Rui Torres (Portugal)
Pagnini 14'; Motaran 16', 22'; Tataranni 24', 27'	Garcia 10'; David 15'; Di Benedetto 18', 21'

19 July 2014; 20:30 CEST (UTC+02)	Report	Switzerland	2 – 6	Germany	Pabellón Amaya Valdemoro, Alcobendas; Referee(s): Oscar Valverde, Francisco Garcia (Spain)
Kissling 14'; Matter 28'	Schulz 9'; Pereira 17'; K. Karschau 20'; Milewski 26'; L. Karschau 29', 30'

19 July 2014; 22:00 CEST (UTC+02)	Report	Spain	6 – 6	Portugal	Pabellón Amaya Valdemoro, Alcobendas; Referee(s): Alessandro Da Prato, Alessandro Eccelsi (Italy)
Gual 10'; Gil 24', 33', 39', 40'; Costa 33'	Rodrigues 3', 35'; Barreiros 5'; Rafael 32'; Silva 32'; Viana 35'

== See also ==
- CERH European Roller Hockey Championship
