= 2006 Rink Hockey European Championship =

Tournament details
- Host country: Italy
- City: Monza

Final positions
- Champions: Spain (13th title)

Tournament statistics
- Games played: 25
- Goals scored: 179 (7.16 per game)
- Scoring leader: (Italy) Francesco Dolce (12 goals)

The 2006 Rink Hockey European Championship was the 47th edition of the Rink Hockey European Championship, the biennial European rink hockey competition. The competition took place in Monza, Italy in the Pallazo dello Sport, also known as Pala Candy, from July 16 to July 22. Spain won the competition for the 13th time, beating Switzerland 2–0 in the final. Portugal took the 3rd place after beating 5-4 the hosts, Italy. This competition was part of the Euro Roller Games 2006, that also featured the European Championships of roller skating and artistic roller skating.

== Format ==
There are 3 groups of 3 teams in Phase I. Each team plays each other within the group and all teams but the worse 3rd place of all groups will go into the quarter-finals.

Then, the losers and the team who didn't go to the quarter-finals will play a Poule for the 5th to 9th position. If any team played each other before this Poule, they won't be playing again: the results from Phase I will count.

The winners in the quarter-finals keep playing each other in a knockout system until the winner is found. There is also a game for 3rd and 4th place for the losers at the Semi-finals.

Every game lasts for 40 minutes, divided into 2 parts of 20, instead of the usual 50 minutes in some leagues.

== Phase I ==
=== Group A ===
Team	G	W	D	L	GF	GA	Dif	Pts
Spain	2	2	0	0	12	2	+10	6
France	2	1	0	1	7	4	+3	3
England	2	0	0	2	0	13	-13	0

17 July 2006
17:00

Spain	8–0	England
Lluís Teixidó - 3'; Pedro Gil - 5', 9', 12', 33'; Eduard Fernández - 16'; Josep Maria Roca - 21'; Jordi Bargalló - 25'	(Report)

Referee: Jurgen Wolter (Germany)

18 July 2006
17:00

England	0–5	France
	(Report)	Henry Guirec - 12', 38'; Sebastien Furstenberger - 14', 19'; Baptiste Lucas - 19'

Referee: Alberto Bisacco (Italy)

19 July 2006
17:00

France	2–4	Spain
Igor Tarassioux - 12'; Julien Huvelin - 15'	(Report)	Marc Gual - 6', 6'; Eduard Fernández - 32'; Pedro Gil - 25'

Referee: Rego Lamela (Portugal)

=== Group B ===
Team	G	W	D	L	GF	GA	Dif	Pts
Italy	2	2	0	0	11	1	+10	6
Germany	2	1	0	1	6	10	-4	3
Austria	2	0	0	2	3	9	-6	0

17 July 2006
19:00

Italy	7–1	Germany
Alessandro Bertolucci - 4', 6'; Francesco Dolce - 5', 14', 18'; Leonardo Squeo - 28'; Alberto Peripolli - 30'	(Report)	Dominik Brandt - 7'

Referee: Rego Lamela (Portugal)

18 July 2006
19:00

Austria	3–5	Germany
David Huber - 22'; Thomas Simcic - 34'; Thomas Haller - 38'	(Report)	Felix Bender - 1', 32'; Dominik Brandt - 6', 36'; Andre Kulossek - 23'

Referee: Anton Sorensen (Netherlands)

19 July 2006
19:00

Italy	4–0	Austria
Alessandro Bertolucci - 0'; Francesco Dolce - 4'; Davide Motaran - 20'; Mirco Bertolucci - 21'	(Report)

Referee: Jurgen Wolter (Germany)

=== Group C ===
Team	G	W	D	L	GF	GA	Dif	Pts
Portugal	2	2	0	0	10	0	+10	6
Switzerland	2	1	0	1	4	9	-5	3
Andorra	2	0	0	2	2	7	-5	0

17 July 2006
21:30

Portugal	3–0	Andorra
Valter Neves - 7'; Reinaldo Ventura - 16'; Jorge Silva - 33'	(Report)

Referee: Anton Sorensen (Netherlands)

18 July 2006
21:30

Switzerland	0–7	Portugal
	(Report)	Sérgio Silva - 14', 20'; Ricardo Barreiros - 18'; Jorge Silva - 30', 36'; Vítor Hugo - 38'; Reinaldo Ventura - 39'

Referee: Gianni Fermi (Italy)

19 July 2006
21:30

Switzerland	4–2	Andorra
Michael Muller - 3', 8'; Florian Brentini - 21'; Gael Jimenez - 34'	(Report)	Marc Montardit - 35'; Ramon Bassols - 39'

Referee: Alberto Bisacco (Italy)

== Knockout Phase ==
=== Bracket ===
Quarter-finals
20 July - 21.30
Portugal	24
Austria	0
20 July - 17.30
Spain	10
Germany	0
20 July - 19.30
Italy	11
Andorra	1
20 July - 15.30
France	3
Switzerland	4

Semi-finals
21 July - 18.30
Portugal	1
Spain	5
21 July - 21.15
Italy	2(3)
Switzerland (PEN)	2(5)

Final
22 July - 21.30
Spain	2
Switzerland	0
Third place
22 July - 18.30
Portugal	5
Italy	4

2006 Rink Hockey European Champion
SPAIN
Thirteenth Title

=== Quarterfinals ===
20 July 2006
15:30

France	3–4	Switzerland
Henry Guirec - 4', 5'; Baptiste Lucas - 32'	(Report)	Federico Mendez - 29'; Stefan Rubi - 31'; Florian Brentini - 32'; Michael Muller - 36'

Referee: Rego Lima (Portugal)

20 July 2006
17:30

Spain	10–0	Germany
Marc Gual - 6', 13'; Sergi Panadero - 7'; Pedro Gil - 9'; Jose Ordeig - 19', 24', 38'; Josep Roca - 24'; Luis Teixidó - 36', 38'	(Report)

Referee: Anton Sorensen (Netherlands)

20 July 2006
19:30

Italy	11–1	Andorra
Mirco Bertolucci - 2', 9', 20'; Francesco Dolce - 7', 12', 16', 19', 20'; Davide Motaran - 17', 27'; Mattia Cocco - 36'	(Report)	Guillem Sarle - 34'

Referee: Enrico Armati (Switzerland)

20 July 2006
21:30

Portugal	24–0	Austria
Tiago Rafael - 0', 18'; Jorge Silva - 1', 7', 31'; Reinaldo Ventura - 2', 22', 26', 27'; Sérgio Silva - 7', 11'; Ricardo Barreiros - 11', 11', 16', 16', 36', 38'; Vítor Hugo - 17', 28', 34', 35'; Pedro Moreira - 27', 29'; Valter Neves - 33'	(Report)

Referee: Xavier Galan (Spain)

=== Semifinals ===
21 July 2006
18:30

Portugal	1–5	Spain
Reinaldo Ventura - 33'	(Report)	Josep Maria Ordeig - 20'; Sergi Panadero - 24'; Marc Gual - 26', 30'; Pedro Gil - 36'

Referee: Gianni Fermi (Italy)

21 July 2006
21:15

Italy	2 (1)–(3) 2	Switzerland
Francesco Dolce - 2'; Mirco Bertolucci - 30'; PENALTIES; Nicola Palagi - no Davide Motaran - no Leonardo Squeo - Goal; Francesco Dolce - no	(Report)	Florian Brentini - 7'; Matthieu Brentini - 10'; PENALTIES; Matthieu Brentini - no Stefan Rubi - Goal; Michael Muller - Goal; Florian Brentini - Goal

Referee: Xavier Galan (Spain)

=== 3rd Place Game ===
22 July 2006
18:30

Portugal	5–4	Italy
Sérgio Silva - 6', 32'; Ricardo Barreiros - 17'; Vítor Hugo - 24', 33'	Report	Davide Motaran - 5'; Francesco Dolce - 25', 26'; Mattia Cocco - 37'

Referee: Enrico Armati (Switzerland)

=== Final ===
22 July 2006
21:30

Spain	2–0	Switzerland
Eduard Fernández - 19'; Marc Gual - 27'	Report

Referee: Rego Lamela (Portugal)

== 5th to 9th Poule ==
Pl	Team	G	W	D	L	GF	GA	Dif	Pts
5	France	4	4	0	0	18	2	+16	12
6	England	4	3	0	1	15	12	+3	9
7	Germany	4	2	0	2	7	7	0	6
8	Andorra	4	1	0	3	13	10	+3	3
9	Austria	4	0	0	4	10	32	-22	0

The games between teams that played against each other in Phase I are not repeated. The result from the Phase I game counted instead. This was the case for two matches, from Group A England vs. France and from Group B Austria vs. Germany:

18 July 2006
17:00

England	0–5	France
	(Report)	Henry Guirec - 12', 38'; Sebastien Furstenberger - 14', 19'; Baptiste Lucas - 19'

Referee: Alberto Bisacco (Italy)

18 July 2006
19:00

Austria	3–5	Germany
David Huber - 22'; Thomas Simcic - 34'; Thomas Haller - 38'	(Report)	Felix Bender - 1', 32'; Dominik Brandt - 6', 36'; Andre Kulossek - 23'

Referee: Anton Sorensen (Netherlands)

The other matches were played as follows:

21 July 2006
08:45

France	2–0	Germany
Igor Tarassioux - 3'; Remy Hourcq - 7'	(Report)

Referee: Xavier Galan (Spain)

21 July 2006
10:30

Andorra	9–3	Austria
Marc Montardit - 5'; Ramon Bassols - 9', 30', 34'; Alex Martin - 16', 17'; Juan Sebastian - 18'; Ivan Villaro - 31', 32'	(Report)	Manuel Parfant - 15'; Michael Schwendinger - 25'; Gunter Faul - 37'

Referee: Anton Sorensen (Netherlands)

21 July 2006
14:30

England	2–1	Germany
James Taylor - 5'; Brendan Barker - 35'	(Report)	Dominik Brandt - 39'

Referee: Rego Lamela (Portugal)

21 July 2006
16:30

Andorra	2–3	France
Ramon Bassols - 3', 7'	(Report)	Sylvain Brochard - 9'; Henry Guirec - 10', 30'

Referee: Enrico Armati (Switzerland)

22 July 2006
09:00

England	3–2	Andorra
James Taylor - 8', 40' (last second); Andrew Gregory - 30'	(Report)	Ramon Bassols - 1', 24'

Referee: Gianni Fermi (Italy)

22 July 2006
10:45

Austria	0–8	France
	(Report)	Sylvain Brochard - 5', 27'; Remy Hourcq - 18', 39'; Sebastien Furstenberger - 29'; Baptiste Lucas - 31', 34'; Henry Guirec - 33'

Referee: Anton Sorensen (Netherlands)

22 July 2006
14:30

Germany	1–0	Andorra
Marc Schinkowski - 4'	(Report)

Referee: Gianni Fermi (Italy)

22 July 2006
16:30

Austria	4–10	England
David Huber - 5', 35', 36'; Thomas Haller - 11'	(Report)	James Taylor - 0', 10', 16', 16', 34', 39'; Brendan Barker - 6', 15', 35'; Karl Smith - 31'

Referee: Anton Sorensen (Netherlands)

== Final table ==
Pl	Team	G	W	D	L	GF	GA	Dif	Pts
1	Spain	5	5	0	0	29	3	+26	15
2	Switzerland	5	2	1	2	10	16	-6	7
3	Portugal	5	4	0	1	40	9	+31	12
4	Italy	5	3	1	1	28	9	+19	10
5	France	6	4	0	2	23	10	+13	12
6	England	5	3	0	2	15	20	-5	9
7	Germany	6	2	0	4	8	24	-16	6
8	Andorra	7	1	0	6	16	28	-12	3
9	Austria	6	0	0	6	10	60	-50	0

== Goal scorers ==
12 goals

- (Italy) Francesco Dolce

9 goals

- (England) James Taylor

8 goals

- (Andorra) Ramon Bassols
- (Portugal) Ricardo Barreiros

7 goals

- (France) Henry Guirec
- (Portugal) Vítor Hugo
- (Portugal) Reinaldo Ventura
- (Spain) Marc Gual
- (Spain) Pedro Gil

6 goals

- (Portugal) Sérgio Silva
- (Portugal) Jorge Silva

5 goals

- (Italy) Mirco Bertolucci

4 goals

- (Austria) David Huber
- (England) Brendan Barker
- (France) Baptiste Lucas
- (Germany) Dominik Brandt
- (Italy) Davide Motaran
- (Spain) Josep Maria Ordeig

3 goals

- (France) Sylvain Brochard
- (France) Sebastien Furstenberger
- (France) Remy Hourcq
- (Italy) Alessandro Bertolucci
- (Spain) Eduard Fernández
- (Spain) Lluís Teixidó
- (Switzerland) Florian Brentini
- (Switzerland) Michael Muller

2 goals

- (Andorra) Alex Martin
- (Andorra) Marc Montardit
- (Andorra) Ivan Villaro
- (Austria) Thomas Haller
- (France) Igor Tarassioux
- (Germany) Felix Bender
- (Italy) Mattia Cocco
- (Portugal) Valter Neves
- (Portugal) Tiago Rafael
- (Portugal) Pedro Moreira
- (Spain) Sergi Panadero
- (Spain) Josep Maria Roca

1 goal

- (Andorra) Guillem Sarle
- (Andorra) Juan Sebastian
- (Austria) Gunter Faul
- (Austria) Manuel Parfant
- (Austria) Thomas Simcic
- (Austria) Michael Schwendinger
- (England) Andrew Gregory
- (England) Karl Smith
- (France) Julien Huvelin
- (Germany) Andre Kussolek
- (Germany) Marc Schinkowski
- (Italy) Leonardo Squeo
- (Italy) Alberto Peripolli
- (Spain) Jordi Bargalló
- (Switzerland) Matthieu Brentini
- (Switzerland) Federico Garcia-Mendez
- (Switzerland) Stefan Rubi
- (Switzerland) Gael Jimenez

== Squads ==
=== Andorra ===
Name	Born in	Goals
Nelson Alves (GK)	1985	
Ramon Bassols	1981	8
Alex Martin	1981	2
Marc Martin	1984	0
Marc Montardit	1977	2
Guillem Sarle	1980	1
Juan Sebastian	1973	1
Ferran Vila	1973	0
Marc Vila (GK)	1981	
Ivan Villaro	1981	2
Carles Puig (Coach)		

=== Austria ===
Name	Born in	Goals
Klemens Schussling (GK)	1984	
Andreas Kunz (GK)	1986	
Gunter Faul	1977	1
Thomas Haller	1974	2
David Huber	1988	4
Martin Laritz	1976	0
Manuel Parfant	1987	1
Thomas Simcic	1976	1
Michael Schwendinger	1982	1
Jokob Stockinger	1986	0
Roland Mayer (Coach)		

=== England ===
Name	Born in	Goals
Ian Morrison (GK)	1983	
Ian Smith (GK)	1984	
Grant Zaccaria	1985	0
Michael Ableson	1986	0
Brendan Barker	1978	4
Andrew Gregory	1983	1
Karl Smith	1979	1
Graeme Stewart	1986	0
James Taylor	1985	9
Joe Wheatley	1969	0
(Portugal) José Carlos Amaral (Coach)		

=== France ===
Name	Born in	Goals
Olivier Gelebart (GK)	1975	
Fabien Savreux (GK)	1973	
Sylvain Brochard	1987	3
Sebastien Furstenberger	1985	3
Nicolas Guilbert	1985	0
Henry Guirec	1978	7
Remy Hourcq	1980	3
Igor Tarassioux	1977	2
Julien Huvelin	1973	1
Baptiste Lucas	1983	4
Eric Marquis (Coach)		

=== Germany ===
Name	Born in	Goals
Marc Berenbeck (GK)	1976	
Patrick Glowka (GK)	1987	
Felix Bender	1985	2
Dominik Brandt	1982	4
Markus Wilk	1977	0
Stefan Gurtler	1985	0
Thomas Haupt	1980	0
Andre Kussolek	1985	1
Tobias Mohr	1980	0
Marc Schinkowski	1983	1
Johan Van Diejen (Coach)		

=== Italy ===
N	Name	Born in	Position	Club	Goals
1	Federico Stagi	1974	GK	Prato	
10	Leonardo Barozzi	1987	GK	Viareggio	
2	Davide Motaran	1984	F	Roller Novara	4
3	Leonardo Squeo	1982	D/M	Vercelli	1
4	Alberto Peripolli	1986	D/M	Breganze	1
5	Francesco Dolce	1973	F	Hockey Novara	12
6	Nicola Palagi	1981	F	Viareggio	0
7	Mattia Cocco	1984	F	Valdagno	2
8	Mirco Bertolucci	1972	F	Follonica	5
9	Alessandro Bertolucci	1969	F	Follonica	3
Coach	Alessandro Cupisti				

=== Portugal ===
N	Name	Born in	Position	Club	Goals
1	Carlos Silva	1982	GK	S.L. Benfica	
10	João Pereira (Ginho)	1980	GK	OC Barcelos	
2	Valter Neves	1983	D/M	S.L. Benfica	2
3	Sérgio Silva	1974	D/M	Follonica (ITA)	6
4	Vítor Hugo	1984	F	ACR Gulpilhares	7
5	Reinaldo Ventura	1978	F	FC Porto	7
6	Tiago Rafael	1983	D/M	OC Barcelos	2
7	Ricardo Barreiros	1982	F	S.L. Benfica	8
8	Jorge Silva	1984	F	FC Porto	6
9	Pedro Moreira	1985	D/M	FC Porto	2
Coach	Paulo Batista				

=== Spain ===
N	Name	Born in	Position	Club	Goals
1	Sergi Fernández	1985	GK	Vic	
10	Juan Ramón de Moya	1971	GK	Noia	
2	Sergi Panadero	1985	D/M	FC Barcelona	2
3	Josep Maria Roca	1981	D/M	Vic	2
4	Jordi Bargallo	1979	F	Liceo	1
5	Josep Maria Ordeig	1981	D/M	Barcelona	4
6	Eduard Fernández	1982	F	Igualada	3
7	Lluís Teixidó	1978	D/M	Reus	3
8	Marc Gual	1980	D/M	Reus	7
9	Pedro Gil	1980	F	FC Porto (POR)	7
Coach	Carlos Feriche				

=== Switzerland ===
Name	Born in	Club	Goals
Bjorn Hauert (GK)	1977	SC Thunerstern	
Nils Hauert (GK)	1983	SC Thunerstern	
Florian Brentini	1983	Genève HC	3
Matthieu Brentini	1980	Genève HC	1
Jerome Desponds	1978	Hockey Novara (ITA)	0
Federico Garcia-Mendez	1987	Genève HC	1
Andreas Munger	1985	RS Uttigen	0
Stefan Rubi	1979	Montreux HC	1
Gael Jimenez	1987	Genève HC	1
Michael Muller	1984	Montreux HC	3
Alain Richard (Coach)			
