= Portuguese Roller Sports Federation =

- Formation: 1933
- Type: Roller Sports Federation
- Headquarters: Federação Portuguesa de Patinagem; Av. Almirante Gago Coutinho, 114 – 114 A, 1700-032 Lisboa
- Location: Portugal
- Members: World Skate; World Skate Europe - Rink Hockey
- Official language: Portuguese
- President: Luís Sénica
- Budget: 2,752,908€
- Website: fpp.pt

The Portuguese Roller Sports Federation (Portuguese: Federação Portuguesa de Patinagem) is the governing body for roller sports, such as rink hockey, Inline hockey, figure skating, speed skating in Portugal.

== Honours ==
- Roller Hockey World Cup: 16
  - 1947, 1948, 1949, 1950, 1952, 1956, 1958, 1960, 1962, 1968, 1974, 1982, 1991, 1993, 2003, 2019
- European Championship: 22
  - 1947, 1948, 1949, 1950, 1952, 1956, 1959, 1961, 1963, 1965, 1967, 1971, 1973, 1975, 1977, 1987, 1992, 1994, 1996, 1998, 2016, 2025
- Nations Cup: 19
  - 1948, 1949, 1954, 1955, 1956, 1963, 1965, 1968, 1970, 1973, 1984, 1987, 1994, 1997, 2009, 2011, 2013, 2015, 2019
- Latin Cup: 14
  - 1957, 1959, 1960, 1961, 1962, 1988, 1989, 1998, 2001, 2002, 2003, 2008, 2014, 2016
- World Games: 4
  - 1981, 1989, 1993, 2001
- U20 World Cup: 4
  - 2003, 2013, 2015, 2017
- Women's European Championship: 3
  - 1997, 1999, 2001
