= 1936 Roller Hockey World Cup =

Roller Hockey Men's World Championships

Tournament details
- Host country: Germany
- Dates: 1 April 1936– 5 April 1936
- Teams: 7 (from 1 confederation)
- Venue(s): 1 (in 1 host city)

Final positions
- Champions: England (1st title)
- Runners-up: Italy
- Third place: Portugal
- Fourth place: Switzerland

Tournament statistics
- Matches played: 21
- Goals scored: 84 (4 per match)

The 1936 Roller Hockey World Cup was the first world cup tournament in the history of roller sports. Organized by the Fédération Internationale de Patinage a Roulettes (now under the name of Fédération Internationale de Roller Sports), it was a roller hockey tournament contested by 7 national teams (all from Europe) and it is also considered the 1936 European Roller Hockey Championship. All the games were played in the city of Stuttgart, in southern Germany, the chosen city to host the World Cup.

== Results ==
Team	BEL	FRA	GER	SWI	POR	ITA	ENG
Belgium							
France	2–1						
Germany	4–0	3–3					
Switzerland	3–1	6–4	2–0				
Portugal	2–0	3–0	2–1	2–0			
Italy	4–0	2–1	3–2	3–3	3–2		
England	5–0	1–0	4–0	4–1	5–0	1–1	

== Standings ==
Team	Pld	W	D	L	GF	GA	GD	Pts
(gold) England (C)	6	5	1	0	21	2	+19	11
(silver) Italy	6	4	2	0	16	9	+7	10
(bronze) Portugal	6	4	0	2	11	10	+1	8
Switzerland	6	3	1	2	15	14	+1	7
Germany	6	1	1	4	10	14	−4	3
France	6	1	1	4	10	16	−6	3
Belgium	6	0	0	6	2	20	−18	0

(C) 1936 World Champion

== See also ==
- FIRS Roller Hockey World Cup
- CERH European Roller Hockey Championship
