= Palacio de los Deportes de Oviedo =

Indoor sporting arena located in Spain

- The turtle
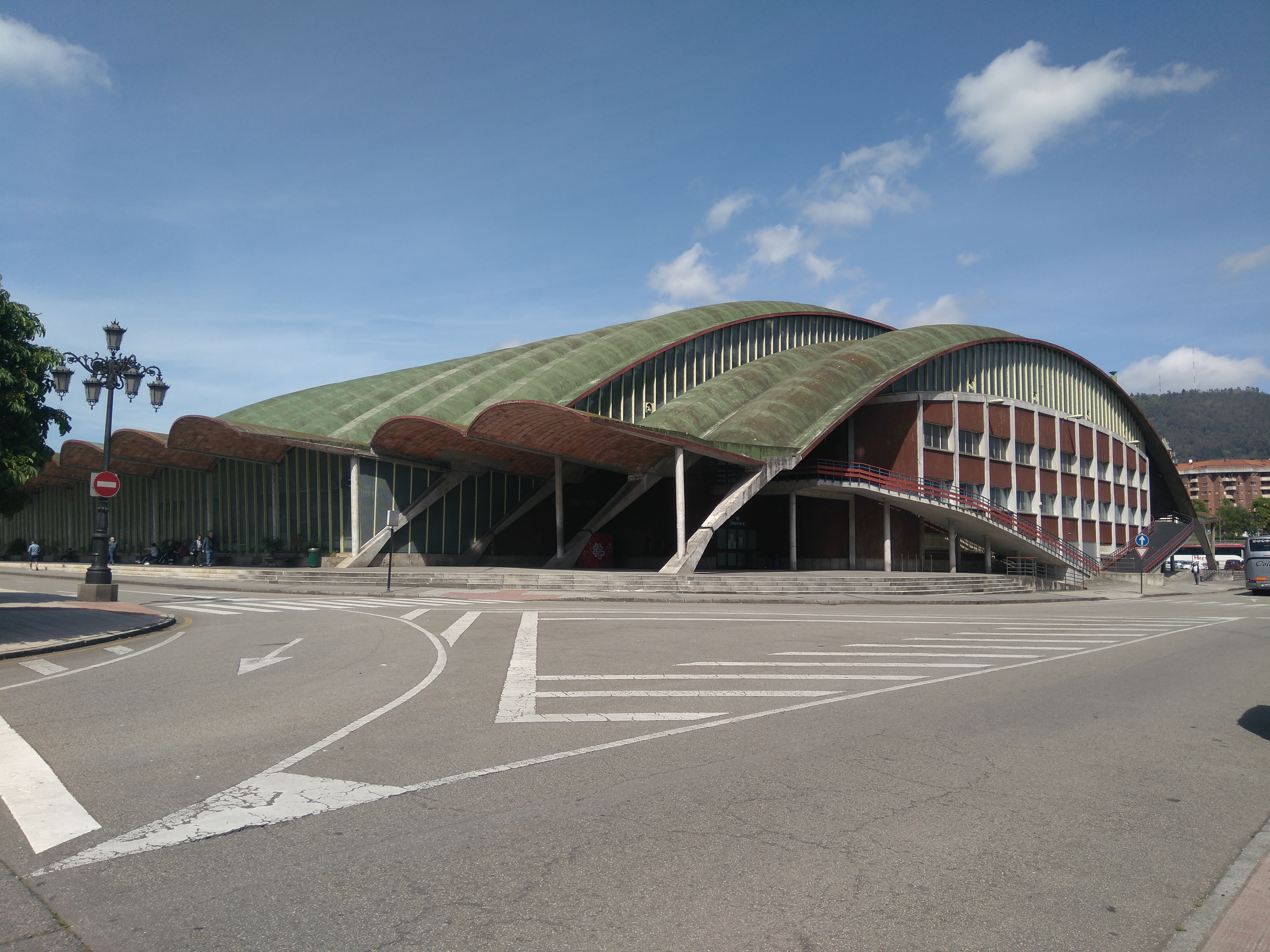
- The arena, before the renovation works
- Interactive map of Palacio de los Deportes de Oviedo
- Full name: Palacio de los Deportes de Oviedo
- Location: Oviedo, Spain
- Coordinates: 43°22′2.87″N 5°49′53″W
- Owner: Oviedo City Hall
- Capacity: 3,713 (1975–2025); 5,340 (2025–present)
- Surface: Parquet Floor
- Record attendance: 5,445; Oviedo CB vs Gipuzkoa BC (22 May 2026)

Construction
- Opened: 1975, September
- Renovated: 2024–2025

Tenant
- Oviedo CB (2025–present)

The Palacio de los Deportes de Oviedo is a multi-purpose sports arena in Oviedo, Asturias, Spain. It has 5,340 seats and a maximum capacity of 9,000 and it is owned by the Oviedo City Hall.

== History ==
The construction started in 1961 and was inaugurated in 1975. Its dome was the first one made entirely of ceramics without building any pillar. As it is green, and has the form of a turtle shell, it is commonly nicknamed as this animal. The indoor track has four lanes around the center and eight in the middle.

It was the main arena of the local rink hockey club CP Cibeles and the nowadays dissolved basketball teams CB Oviedo and CB Vetusta.

In June 2025, the Palacio de Deportes will be reinaugurated after the end of the works of its renovation and capacity expansion that started in 2024.

== League attendances ==
This is a list of league games attendances of Oviedo CB at Palacio de los Deportes.

Season	Total	High	Low	Average
2025–26 1ª FEB	77,256	5,445	3,511	4,544

== Events held at Palacio de Deportes ==
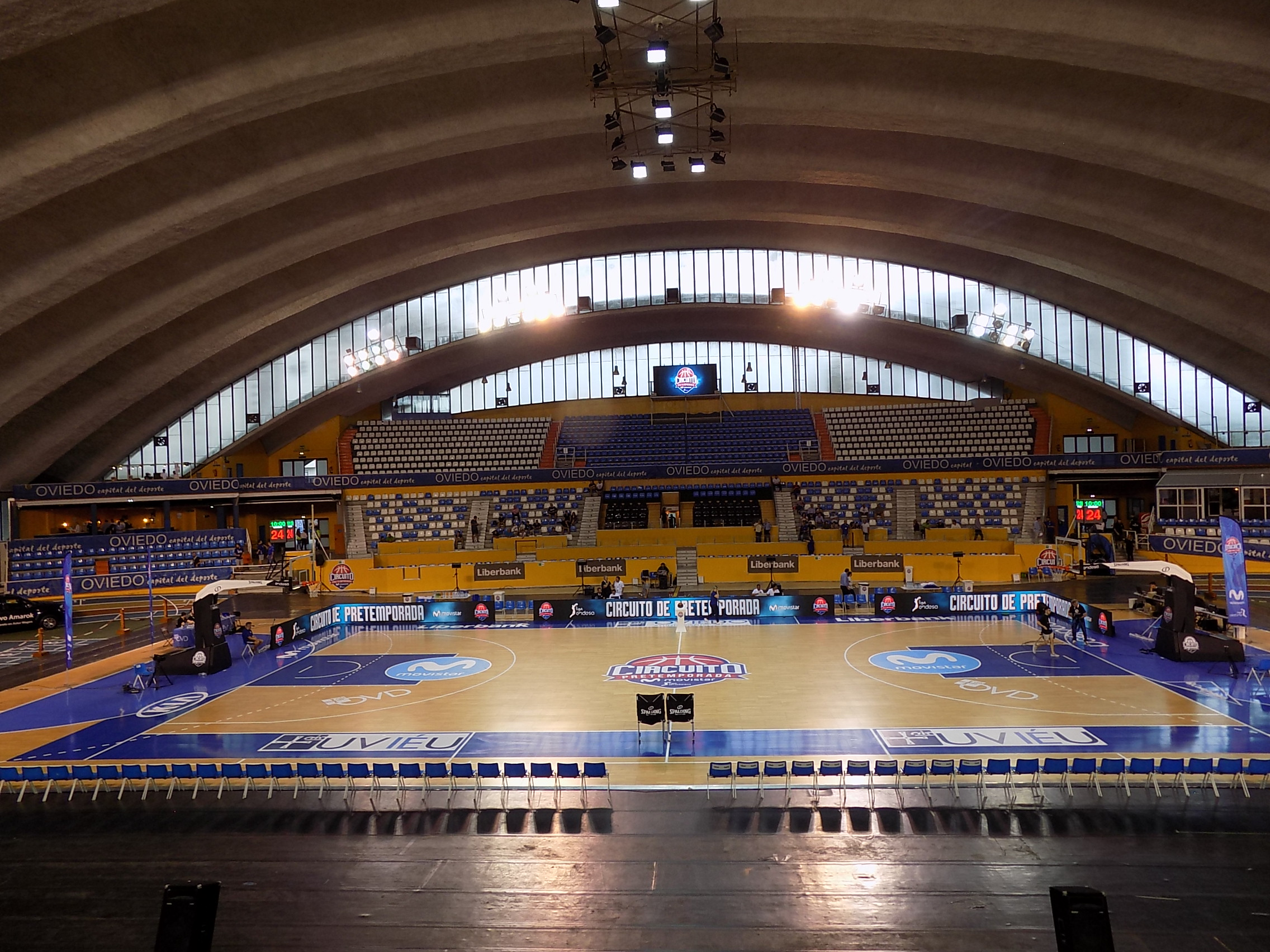
Palacio de los Deportes de Oviedo before its renovation.

Since its inauguration, the Palacio de Deportes held several important championships.

- 1976 Roller Hockey World Cup
- 1981 CERH Cup Winners' Cup Finals: First leg match, CP Cibeles v Sporting CP
- 1983 1982–83 Liga Española de Baloncesto Finals: Final match, Barcelona v Real Madrid
- 1986 FIBA World Championship: Semifinal round, Group B
- 1987 CERH European Roller Hockey Championship
- 2008 Rink Hockey European Championship
- 2012 Davis Cup World Group: First round, Spain v Kazakhstan
- 2013 Copa del Rey de Hockey Patines
