= 1939 Roller Hockey World Cup =

Roller Hockey Men's World Championships

Tournament details
- Host country: Switzerland
- Dates: 6 April 1939– 10 April 1939
- Teams: 7 (from 1 confederation)
- Venue(s): 1 (in 1 host city)

Final positions
- Champions: England (2nd title)
- Runners-up: Italy
- Third place: Portugal
- Fourth place: Belgium

Tournament statistics
- Matches played: 21
- Goals scored: 101 (4.81 per match)

The 1939 Roller Hockey World Cup was the second roller hockey world cup, organized by the Fédération Internationale de Patinage a Roulettes (now under the name of Fédération Internationale de Roller Sports). It was contested by 7 national teams (all from Europe) and it is also considered the 1939 European Roller Hockey Championship and the 1939 Montreux Nations Cup. All the games were played in the city of Montreux, in Switzerland, the chosen city to host the World Cup.

== Results ==
Team	SWI	GER	FRA	BEL	POR	ITA	ENG
Switzerland							
Germany	4–1						
France	5–4	1–7					
Belgium	4–4	2–0	0–2				
Portugal	0–0	2–1	1–1	2–1			
Italy	8–1	6–1	6–1	1–2	5–1		
England	5–2	2–0	4–1	4–1	3–0	4–1	

== Standings ==
Team	Pld	W	D	L	GF	GA	GD	Pts
(gold) England (C)	6	6	0	0	22	5	+17	12
(silver) Italy	6	4	0	2	27	10	+17	8
(bronze) Portugal	6	2	2	2	6	11	−5	6
Belgium	6	2	1	3	10	13	−3	5
France	6	2	1	3	11	22	−11	5
Germany	6	2	0	4	13	14	−1	4
Switzerland	6	0	2	4	12	26	−14	2

(C) 1939 World Champion

== See also ==
- FIRS Roller Hockey World Cup
- CERH European Roller Hockey Championship
- Montreux Nations Cup
