= 1986 FIBA World Championship =

1986 edition of the FIBA World Championship

FIBA Mundobasket Campeonato 1986

Tournament details
- Host country: Spain
- Dates: 5–20 July
- Officially opened by: Juan Carlos I
- Teams: 24 (from 5 confederations)
- Venue: 7 (in 7 host cities)

Final positions
- Champions: United States (2nd title)
- Runners-up: Soviet Union
- Third place: Yugoslavia
- Fourth place: Brazil

Tournament statistics
- Games played: 90
- MVP: (Socialist Federal Republic of Yugoslavia) Dražen Petrović
- Top scorer: (Greece) Nikos Galis (33.7 points per game)

The 1986 FIBA World Championship was the 10th FIBA World Championship, the international basketball world championship for men's national teams. It was hosted by Spain and was held from 5 to 20 July 1986. The final phase of the tournament was held at the Palacio de Deportes de la Comunidad, Madrid. They were classified as the official men's basketball event of the 1986 Goodwill Games, held simultaneously in Moscow. This was the final tournament for West Germany, which did not participate in the next tournament prior to its unification with East Germany.

== Venues ==
| Group A | Group B | Group C | Group D | Group E | Group F | Classification and Final phase |
| Zaragoza | Ferrol | Málaga | Tenerife | Barcelona | Oviedo | Madrid |
|---|---|---|---|---|---|---|
| Palacio de los Deportes | Polideportivo A Malata | Palacio de los Deportes de Ciudad Jardín | Pabellón Central Santa Cruz de Tenerife | Sports Palace of Barcelona | Palacio Municipal de Deportes | Community of Madrid Sports Palace |
| Capacity: 5,000 | Capacity: 5,000 | Capacity: 5,000 | Capacity: 6,000 | Capacity: 8,000 | Capacity: 6,000 | Capacity: 12,000 |

== Competing nations ==
| Group A | Group B | Group C | Group D | Withdrawn |
|---|---|---|---|---|
| Brazil; France; Greece; South Korea; Panama; Spain | Angola; Australia; Cuba; Israel; Soviet Union; Uruguay | China; Ivory Coast; Italy; Puerto Rico; United States; West Germany | Argentina; Canada; Malaysia; Netherlands; New Zealand; Yugoslavia | Philippines |

== Preliminary round ==
=== Group A ===
| Pos | Team | Pld | W | L | PF | PA | PD | Pts | Qualification |
|---|---|---|---|---|---|---|---|---|---|
| 1 | Brazil | 5 | 4 | 1 | 478 | 419 | +59 | 9 (Note: Head-to-head record: Brazil 1–0 Spain) | Semifinal round |
| 2 | Spain (H) | 5 | 4 | 1 | 488 | 395 | +93 | 9 | Semifinal round |
| 3 | Greece | 5 | 3 | 2 | 476 | 447 | +29 | 8 (Note: Head-to-head record: Greece 1–0 France) | Semifinal round |
| 4 | France | 5 | 3 | 2 | 449 | 428 | +21 | 8 | |
| 5 | Panama | 5 | 1 | 4 | 435 | 517 | −82 | 6 | |
| 6 | South Korea | 5 | 0 | 5 | 414 | 534 | −120 | 5 | |

Source: FIBA archive
Rules for classification: 1) points; 2) head-to-head points; 3) head-to-head goal average; 4) head-to-head number of points scored.
(H) Hosts
Notes:

5 July

| Spain | 84–80 | France |
Scoring by half: 45-50, 39-30

Palacio de los Deportes de Zaragoza, Zaragoza

5 July

| Brazil | 104–74 | South Korea |
Scoring by half: 48-35, 56-39

Palacio de los Deportes de Zaragoza, Zaragoza

5 July

| Panama | 81–110 | Greece |
Scoring by half: 45-53, 36-57

Palacio de los Deportes de Zaragoza, Zaragoza

6 July

| Spain | 120–73 | South Korea |
Scoring by half: 50-42, 70-31

Palacio de los Deportes de Zaragoza, Zaragoza

6 July

| France | 84–87 | Greece |
Scoring by half: 39-53, 45-34

Palacio de los Deportes de Zaragoza, Zaragoza

7 July

| Spain | 87–86 | Greece |
Scoring by half: 43-41, 44-45

Palacio de los Deportes de Zaragoza, Zaragoza

7 July

| Brazil | 88–85 (OT) | Panama |
Scoring by half: 45-50, 35-30 Overtime: 8-5

Palacio de los Deportes de Zaragoza, Zaragoza

8 July

| France | 93–85 | Brazil |
Scoring by half: 46-41, 47-44

Palacio de los Deportes de Zaragoza, Zaragoza

8 July

| South Korea | 103–111 | Panama |
Scoring by half: 55-61, 48-50

Palacio de los Deportes de Zaragoza, Zaragoza

9 July

| Greece | 95–115 | Brazil |
Scoring by half: 45-56, 50-59

Palacio de los Deportes de Zaragoza, Zaragoza

9 July

| Spain | 125–70 | Panama |
Scoring by half: 58-43, 67-27

Palacio de los Deportes de Zaragoza, Zaragoza

9 July

| South Korea | 84–101 | France |
Scoring by half: 43-49, 41-52

Palacio de los Deportes de Zaragoza, Zaragoza

10 July

| Panama | 88–91 | France |
Scoring by half: 48-50, 40-41

Palacio de los Deportes de Zaragoza, Zaragoza

10 July

| Spain | 72–86 | Brazil |
Scoring by half: 37-44, 35-42

Palacio de los Deportes de Zaragoza, Zaragoza

10 July

| Greece | 98–80 | South Korea |
Scoring by half: 53-38, 45-42

Palacio de los Deportes de Zaragoza, Zaragoza

=== Group B ===
| Pos | Team | Pld | W | L | PF | PA | PD | Pts | Qualification |
|---|---|---|---|---|---|---|---|---|---|
| 1 | Soviet Union | 5 | 5 | 0 | 565 | 369 | +196 | 10 | Semifinal round |
| 2 | Israel | 5 | 3 | 2 | 435 | 444 | −9 | 8 | Semifinal round |
| 3 | Cuba | 5 | 2 | 3 | 399 | 418 | −19 | 7 (Note: Head-to-head record: Cuba 1–1 (1.03 GAvg), Australia 1–1 (1.02 GAvg), Uruguay 1–1 (0.95 GAvg)) | Semifinal round |
| 4 | Australia | 5 | 2 | 3 | 405 | 430 | −25 | 7 | |
| 5 | Uruguay | 5 | 2 | 3 | 377 | 437 | −60 | 7 | |
| 6 | Angola | 5 | 1 | 4 | 334 | 417 | −83 | 6 | |

Source: FIBA archive
Rules for classification: 1) points; 2) head-to-head points; 3) head-to-head goal average; 4) head-to-head number of points scored.
Notes:

5 July

| Australia | 72–66 | Cuba |
Scoring by half: 32-37, 40-29

Polideportivo A Malata, Ferrol

5 July

| Uruguay | 79–84 | Israel |
Scoring by half: 38-46, 41-38

Polideportivo A Malata, Ferrol

5 July

| Soviet Union | 89–51 | Angola |
Scoring by half: 45-29, 44-22

Polideportivo A Malata, Ferrol

6 July

| Angola | 75–95 | Israel |
Scoring by half: 32-37, 43-58

Polideportivo A Malata, Ferrol

6 July

| Soviet Union | 129–87 | Cuba |
Scoring by half: 60-53, 69-34

Polideportivo A Malata, Ferrol

7 July

| Soviet Union | 114–77 | Israel |
Scoring by half: 58-36, 56-41

Polideportivo A Malata, Ferrol

7 July

| Australia | 74–77 | Uruguay |
Scoring by half: 32-39, 42-38

Polideportivo A Malata, Ferrol

8 July

| Cuba | 87–76 | Uruguay |
Scoring by quarter: 42-28, 45-48

Polideportivo A Malata, Ferrol

8 July

| Angola | 74–69 | Australia |
Scoring by half: 36-34, 38-35

Polideportivo A Malata, Ferrol

9 July

| Cuba | 81–53 | Angola |
Scoring by half: 46-23, 35-30

Polideportivo A Malata, Ferrol

9 July

| Soviet Union | 111–62 | Uruguay |
Scoring by half: 58-33, 53-29

Polideportivo A Malata, Ferrol

9 July

| Israel | 91–98 | Australia |
Scoring by half: 40-48, 51-50

Polideportivo A Malata, Ferrol

10 July

| Uruguay | 83–81 (OT) | Angola |
Scoring by half: 29-34, 44-39 Overtime: 10-8

Polideportivo A Malata, Ferrol

10 July

| Soviet Union | 122–92 | Australia |
Scoring by half: 45-46, 77-46

Polideportivo A Malata, Ferrol

10 July

| Israel | 88–78 | Cuba |
Scoring by half: 45-32, 43-46

Polideportivo A Malata, Ferrol

=== Group C ===
| Pos | Team | Pld | W | L | PF | PA | PD | Pts | Qualification |
|---|---|---|---|---|---|---|---|---|---|
| 1 | United States | 5 | 5 | 0 | 446 | 348 | +98 | 10 | Semifinal round |
| 2 | Italy | 5 | 4 | 1 | 423 | 366 | +57 | 9 | Semifinal round |
| 3 | China | 5 | 2 | 3 | 430 | 442 | −12 | 7 (Note: Head-to-head record: China 1–1 (1.08 GAvg), Puerto Rico 1–1 (0.99 GAvg), West Germany 1–1 (0.93 GAvg)) | Semifinal round |
| 4 | Puerto Rico | 5 | 2 | 3 | 383 | 373 | +10 | 7 | |
| 5 | West Germany | 5 | 2 | 3 | 382 | 397 | −15 | 7 | |
| 6 | Ivory Coast | 5 | 0 | 5 | 322 | 460 | −138 | 5 | |

Source: FIBA archive
Rules for classification: 1) points; 2) head-to-head points; 3) head-to-head goal average; 4) head-to-head number of points scored.
Notes:

5 July

| Italy | 98–87 | China |
Scoring by half: 60-41, 38-46

Palacio de los Deportes de Ciudad Jardín, Málaga

5 July

| United States | 99–63 | Ivory Coast |
Scoring by half: 50-22, 49-41

Palacio de los Deportes de Ciudad Jardín, Málaga

5 July

| Puerto Rico | 81–69 | West Germany |
Scoring by half: 38-31, 43-38

Palacio de los Deportes de Ciudad Jardín, Málaga

6 July

| Ivory Coast | 70–88 | West Germany |
Scoring by half: 38-47, 32-41

Palacio de los Deportes de Ciudad Jardín, Málaga

6 July

| United States | 107–81 | China |
Scoring by half: 57-39, 50-42

Palacio de los Deportes de Ciudad Jardín, Málaga

7 July

| United States | 81–68 | West Germany |
Scoring by half: 47-39, 34-29

Palacio de los Deportes de Ciudad Jardín, Málaga

7 July

| Italy | 78–55 | Puerto Rico |
Scoring by half: 35-25, 43-30

Palacio de los Deportes de Ciudad Jardín, Málaga

8 July

| China | 98–84 | Puerto Rico |
Scoring by half: 48-42, 50-42

Palacio de los Deportes de Ciudad Jardín, Málaga

8 July

| Ivory Coast | 62–98 | Italy |
Scoring by half: 35-48, 27-50

Palacio de los Deportes de Ciudad Jardín, Málaga

9 July

| China | 84–72 | Ivory Coast |
Scoring by half: 48-35, 36-37

Palacio de los Deportes de Ciudad Jardín, Málaga

9 July

| West Germany | 76–85 | Italy |
Scoring by half: 38-39, 38-46

Palacio de los Deportes de Ciudad Jardín, Málaga

9 July

| United States | 73–72 | Puerto Rico |
Scoring by half: 42-40, 31-32

Palacio de los Deportes de Ciudad Jardín, Málaga

10 July

| Puerto Rico | 91–55 | Ivory Coast |
Scoring by half: 43-23, 48-32

Palacio de los Deportes de Ciudad Jardín, Málaga

10 July

| West Germany | 81–80 | China |
Scoring by half: 46-41, 35-39

Palacio de los Deportes de Ciudad Jardín, Málaga

10 July

| United States | 86–64 | Italy |
Scoring by half: 40-25, 46-39

Palacio de los Deportes de Ciudad Jardín, Málaga

=== Group D ===
| Pos | Team | Pld | W | L | PF | PA | PD | Pts | Qualification |
|---|---|---|---|---|---|---|---|---|---|
| 1 | Yugoslavia | 5 | 5 | 0 | 514 | 364 | +150 | 10 | Semifinal round |
| 2 | Canada | 5 | 4 | 1 | 510 | 356 | +154 | 9 | Semifinal round |
| 3 | Argentina | 5 | 3 | 2 | 414 | 395 | +19 | 8 | Semifinal round |
| 4 | Netherlands | 5 | 2 | 3 | 422 | 405 | +17 | 7 | |
| 5 | New Zealand | 5 | 1 | 4 | 362 | 476 | −114 | 6 | |
| 6 | Malaysia | 5 | 0 | 5 | 313 | 539 | −226 | 5 | |

Source: FIBA archive
Rules for classification: 1) points; 2) head-to-head points; 3) head-to-head goal average; 4) head-to-head number of points scored.

5 July

| Argentina | 82–75 (OT) | Netherlands |
Scoring by half: 36-44, 35-27 Overtime: 11-4

Pabellón Central Santa Cruz de Tenerife, Tenerife

5 July

| Yugoslavia | 118–81 | New Zealand |
Scoring by half: 61-43, 57-38

Pabellón Central Santa Cruz de Tenerife, Tenerife

5 July

| Canada | 128–38 | Malaysia |
Scoring by half: 71-17, 57-21

Pabellón Central Santa Cruz de Tenerife, Tenerife

6 July

| New Zealand | 66–84 | Netherlands |
Scoring by half: 32-36, 34-48

Pabellón Central Santa Cruz de Tenerife, Tenerife

6 July

| Yugoslavia | 131–61 | Malaysia |
Scoring by half: 64-31, 67-30

Pabellón Central Santa Cruz de Tenerife, Tenerife

7 July

| Canada | 96–82 | Argentina |
Scoring by half: 51-30, 45-52

Pabellón Central Santa Cruz de Tenerife, Tenerife

7 July

| Yugoslavia | 95–74 | Netherlands |
Scoring by half: 54-47, 41-27

Pabellón Central Santa Cruz de Tenerife, Tenerife

8 July

| New Zealand | 74–110 | Canada |
Scoring by half: 48-43, 26-67

Pabellón Central Santa Cruz de Tenerife, Tenerife

8 July

| Malaysia | 73–93 | Argentina |
Scoring by half: 30-53, 43-40

Pabellón Central Santa Cruz de Tenerife, Tenerife

9 July

| Yugoslavia | 87–68 | Argentina |
Scoring by half: 40-41, 47-27

Pabellón Central Santa Cruz de Tenerife, Tenerife

9 July

| Netherlands | 79–96 | Canada |
Scoring by half: 41-41, 38-55

Pabellón Central Santa Cruz de Tenerife, Tenerife

9 July

| Malaysia | 75–77 | New Zealand |
Scoring by half: 35-43, 40-34

Pabellón Central Santa Cruz de Tenerife, Tenerife

10 July

| Netherlands | 110–66 | Malaysia |
Scoring by half: 56-28, 54-38

Pabellón Central Santa Cruz de Tenerife, Tenerife

10 July

| Yugoslavia | 83–80 | Canada |
Scoring by half: 45-42, 38-38

Pabellón Central Santa Cruz de Tenerife, Tenerife

10 July

| Argentina | 89–64 | New Zealand |
Scoring by half: 40-36, 49-28

Pabellón Central Santa Cruz de Tenerife, Tenerife

== Semifinal round ==
=== Group 1 ===
| Pos | Team | Pld | W | L | PF | PA | PD | Pts | Qualification |
|---|---|---|---|---|---|---|---|---|---|
| 1 | Soviet Union | 5 | 5 | 0 | 546 | 441 | +105 | 10 | Semifinals |
| 2 | Brazil | 5 | 4 | 1 | 491 | 435 | +56 | 9 | Semifinals |
| 3 | Spain (H) | 5 | 3 | 2 | 414 | 402 | +12 | 8 | 5th–8th classification round |
| 4 | Israel | 5 | 2 | 3 | 387 | 455 | −68 | 7 | 5th–8th classification round |
| 5 | Cuba | 5 | 1 | 4 | 399 | 460 | −61 | 6 | 9th–12th classification round |
| 6 | Greece | 5 | 0 | 5 | 419 | 463 | −44 | 5 | 9th–12th classification round |

Source: FIBA archive
Rules for classification: 1) points; 2) head-to-head points; 3) head-to-head goal average; 4) head-to-head number of points scored.
(H) Hosts

13 July

| Brazil | 99–83 | Cuba |
Scoring by half: 53-37, 46-46

Palau dels Esports de Barcelona, Barcelona

13 July

| Spain | 94–65 | Israel |
Scoring by half: 48-34, 46-31

Palau dels Esports de Barcelona, Barcelona

13 July

| Greece | 93–105 | Soviet Union |
Scoring by half: 46-59, 47-46

Palau dels Esports de Barcelona, Barcelona

14 July

| Greece | 66–74 | Cuba |
Scoring by half: 37-43, 29-31

Palau dels Esports de Barcelona, Barcelona

14 July

| Spain | 83–88 | Soviet Union |
Scoring by half: 40-47, 43-41

Palau dels Esports de Barcelona, Barcelona

14 July

| Brazil | 90–75 | Israel |
Scoring by half: 40-40, 50-35

Palau dels Esports de Barcelona, Barcelona

15 July

| Greece | 79–82 | Israel |
Scoring by half: 42-35, 37-47

Palau dels Esports de Barcelona, Barcelona

15 July

| Spain | 78–77 | Cuba |
Scoring by half: 37-47, 41-30

Palau dels Esports de Barcelona, Barcelona

15 July

| Brazil | 101–110 | Soviet Union |
Scoring by half: 50-62, 51-48

Palau dels Esports de Barcelona, Barcelona

=== Group 2 ===
| Pos | Team | Pld | W | L | PF | PA | PD | Pts | Qualification |
|---|---|---|---|---|---|---|---|---|---|
| 1 | United States | 5 | 4 | 1 | 409 | 344 | +65 | 9 (Note: Head-to-head results: United States 1–0 Yugoslavia) | Semifinals |
| 2 | Yugoslavia | 5 | 4 | 1 | 438 | 375 | +63 | 9 | Semifinals |
| 3 | Italy | 5 | 3 | 2 | 405 | 431 | −26 | 8 | 5th–8th classification round |
| 4 | Canada | 5 | 2 | 3 | 422 | 412 | +10 | 7 (Note: Head-to-head results: Canada 1–0 Argentina) | 5th–8th classification round |
| 5 | Argentina | 5 | 2 | 3 | 391 | 411 | −20 | 7 | 9th–12th classification round |
| 6 | China | 5 | 0 | 5 | 411 | 503 | −92 | 5 | 9th–12th classification round |

Source: FIBA archive
Rules for classification: 1) points; 2) head-to-head points; 3) head-to-head goal average; 4) head-to-head number of points scored.
Notes:

13 July

| United States | 70–74 | Argentina |
Scoring by half: 34-37, 36-37

Palacio Municipal de Deportes de Oviedo, Oviedo

13 July

| Italy | 89–86 | Canada |
Scoring by half: 43-43, 46-43

Palacio Municipal de Deportes de Oviedo, Oviedo

13 July

| China | 82–106 | Yugoslavia |
Scoring by half: 45-60, 37-46

Palacio Municipal de Deportes de Oviedo, Oviedo

14 July

| Italy | 76–102 | Yugoslavia |
Scoring by half: 39-52, 37-50

Palacio Municipal de Deportes de Oviedo, Oviedo

14 July

| United States | 77–65 | Canada |
Scoring by half: 38-26, 39-39

Palacio Municipal de Deportes de Oviedo, Oviedo

14 July

| China | 80–97 | Argentina |
Scoring by half: 45-45, 35-52

Palacio Municipal de Deportes de Oviedo, Oviedo

15 July

| Italy | 78–70 | Argentina |
Scoring by half: 38-31, 40-39

Palacio Municipal de Deportes de Oviedo, Oviedo

15 July

| United States | 69–60 | Yugoslavia |
Scoring by half: 37-30, 32-30

Palacio Municipal de Deportes de Oviedo, Oviedo

15 July

| China | 81–95 | Canada |
Scoring by half: 48-48, 33-47

Palacio Municipal de Deportes de Oviedo, Oviedo

== 9th–12th classification ==
Semifinals
Greece | 102
Argentina | 88
China | 93
Cuba | 78

9th place game
Greece | 111
China | 112
11th place game
Argentina | 81
Cuba | 85

=== Semifinals ===
18 July

| Cuba | 78–93 | China |
Scoring by half: 33-51, 45-42

Palacio de Deportes de la Comunidad de Madrid, Madrid

18 July

| Argentina | 88–102 | Greece |
Scoring by half: 38-44, 50-58

Palacio de Deportes de la Comunidad de Madrid, Madrid

=== Eleventh place playoff ===
19 July

| Cuba | 85–81 | Argentina |
Scoring by half: 45-43, 40-38

Palacio de Deportes de la Comunidad de Madrid, Madrid

=== Ninth place playoff ===
20 July

| China | 112–111 | Greece |
Scoring by half: 58-54, 54-57

Palacio de Deportes de la Comunidad de Madrid, Madrid

== 5th–8th classification ==
Semifinals
Spain | 100
Canada | 80
Italy | 100
Israel | 78

5th place game
Spain | 87
Italy | 69
7th place game
Canada | 84
Israel | 97

=== Semifinals ===
17 July

| Spain | 100–80 | Canada |
Scoring by half: 48-37, 52-43

Palacio de Deportes de la Comunidad de Madrid, Madrid

18 July

| Italy | 100–78 | Israel |
Scoring by half: 48-43, 52-35

Palacio de Deportes de la Comunidad de Madrid, Madrid

=== Seventh place playoff ===
19 July

| Canada | 84–97 | Israel |
Scoring by half: 45-64, 39-33

Palacio de Deportes de la Comunidad de Madrid, Madrid

=== Fifth place playoff ===
20 July

| Spain | 87–69 | Italy |
Scoring by half: 43-36, 44-33

Palacio de Deportes de la Comunidad de Madrid, Madrid

== Final round ==
Semifinals
United States | 96
Brazil | 80
Soviet Union (OT) | 91
Yugoslavia | 90

Gold medal game
United States | 87
Soviet Union | 85
Bronze medal game
Brazil | 91
Yugoslavia | 117

=== Semifinals ===
17 July

| Soviet Union | 91–90 (OT) | Yugoslavia |
Scoring by half: 37-40, 48-45 Overtime: 6-5

Palacio de Deportes de la Comunidad de Madrid, Madrid

17 July

| United States | 96–80 | Brazil |
Scoring by half: 60-37, 36-43

Palacio de Deportes de la Comunidad de Madrid, Madrid

=== Third place playoff ===
19 July

| Yugoslavia | 117–91 | Brazil |
Scoring by half: 59-47, 58-44

Palacio de Deportes de la Comunidad de Madrid, Madrid

=== Final ===
20 July

| Soviet Union | 85–87 | United States |
Scoring by half: 38–48, 47–39
| Pts: Chomičius 17 | | Pts: K. Smith 23 |

Palacio de Deportes de la Comunidad de Madrid, Madrid

== Final standings ==
| Rank | Team | Record |
|---|---|---|
| 1st place, gold medalist(s) | United States | 9–1 |
| 2nd place, silver medalist(s) | Soviet Union | 9–1 |
| 3rd place, bronze medalist(s) | Yugoslavia | 8–2 |
| 4 | Brazil | 6–4 |
| 5 | Spain | 8–2 |
| 6 | Italy | 7–3 |
| 7 | Israel | 5–5 |
| 8 | Canada | 5–5 |
| 9 | China | 4–6 |
| 10 | Greece | 4–6 |
| 11 | Cuba | 4–6 |
| 12 | Argentina | 5–5 |
| 13 | France | 3–2 |
| 13 | Netherlands | 2–3 |
| 13 | Puerto Rico | 2–3 |
| 13 | West Germany | 2–3 |
| 13 | Australia | 2–3 |
| 13 | Uruguay | 2–3 |
| 13 | Panama | 1–4 |
| 13 | Angola | 1–4 |
| 13 | New Zealand | 1–4 |
| 13 | South Korea | 0–5 |
| 13 | Ivory Coast | 0–5 |
| 13 | Malaysia | 0–5 |
| WD | Philippines | — |

1986 FIBA World Championship

United States
Second title

MVP
(Socialist Federal Republic of Yugoslavia) Dražen Petrović

Team roster

Tommy Amaker, Muggsy Bogues, Sean Elliott, Armen Gilliam, Tom Hammonds, Steve Kerr, Derrick McKey, David Robinson, Rony Seikaly, Brian Shaw, Charles Smith, and Kenny Smith. Head coach: Lute Olson.

- Teams that were eliminated in the preliminary round were all tied for 13th place, regardless of their win–loss records.
- The Philippines withdrew from the competition due to the People Power Revolution going on in their country.

== All-Tournament Team ==
- Dražen Petrović (Yugoslavia)
- Arvydas Sabonis (USSR)
- Oscar Schmidt (Brazil)
- David Robinson (USA)
- Valeri Tikhonenko (USSR)

== Top scorers (ppg) ==
1. Nikos Galis (Greece) 33.7
2. Oscar Schmidt (Brazil) 28.1
3. Lee Chung Hee (South Korea) 27.8
4. Dražen Petrović (Yugoslavia) 25.2
5. Kim Hyun-jun (South Korea) 19.4
6. Juan Antonio San Epifanio (Spain) 19.3
7. Antonello Riva (Italy) 19.2
8. Tan Kim Chin (Malaysia) 19.2
9. Mario Butler (Panama) 19.0
10. Marcel de Souza Ponickwar (Brazil) 18.0
