= Sérgio Pereira =

Brazilian footballer

Personal information
- Date of birth: 16 May 1898
- Position: Midfielder

International career
Years	Team	Apps	(Gls)
1919	Brazil	4	(0)

Sérgio Pereira (born 16 May 1898, date of death unknown) was a Brazilian footballer who played as a midfielder. He played in four matches for the Brazil national football team in 1919. He was also part of Brazil's squad for the 1919 South American Championship.
