= Uni-Halle =

Indoor sporting arena in Wuppertal, Germany

Coordinates: 51°14′28″N 7°08′52″E

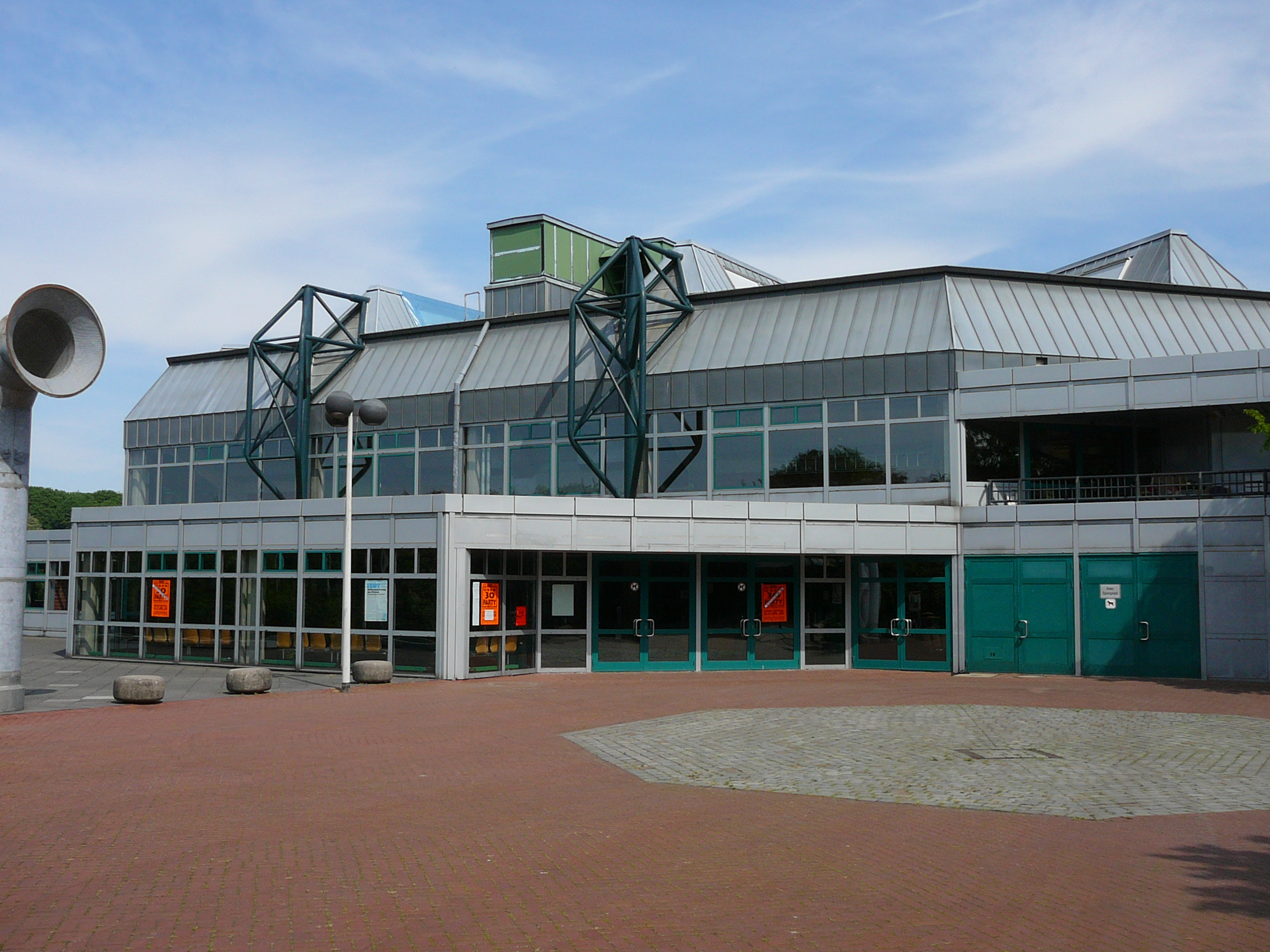
Uni-Halle

The Uni-Halle (university hall) is an indoor sporting arena located in Wuppertal, Germany. The capacity of the arena is 3,200 people. It is currently home to the Bergischer HC handball team.
