= Alessandro Verona =

Italian roller hockey player (born 1995)

Personal information
- Nationality: Italian
- Born: 11 August 1995 (age 30) Pietrasanta, Italy
- Years active: 2012–

Sport
- Country: Italy
- Sport: Roller hockey
- Team: (Italy) Forte dei Marmi (2012–2015) (Italy) Lodi (2015–2019) (Portugal) Sporting CP (2019–)

Alessandro Verona (born 11 August 1995) is an Italian professional roller hockey player who plays for Sporting CP.
