= 2012 CERH European Championship =

CERH Euro 2012
2012 Roller Hockey European Championship Campeonato da Europa de Hóquei em Patins de 2012

Tournament details
- Host country: Portugal
- Dates: 9 September – 15 September
- Teams: 7
- Venue(s): 1 (in 1 host city)

Final positions
- Champions: Spain (16th title)
- Runners-up: Portugal
- Third place: Italy
- Fourth place: France

Tournament statistics
- Matches played: 21
- Goals scored: 176 (8.38 per match)
- Top scorer(s): (Spain) Pedro Gil (14)

The 2012 CERH European Championship or 2012 Roller Hockey European Championship was the 50th edition of the CERH European Roller Hockey Championship. It took place from 9 to 15 September, in Paredes, Portugal.

== Venue ==
All games were played at the Pavilhão Municipal Rota dos Móveis, in Paredes.

== Pool ==
Key to colors
CERH European Champion

All times are Western European Summer Time (UTC+1)

Team	Pld	W	D	L	GF	GA	GD	Pts
Spain	6	6	0	0	45	6	+39	18
Portugal	6	5	0	1	49	11	+38	15
Italy	6	4	0	2	25	12	+13	12
France	6	3	0	3	22	23	–1	9
Switzerland	6	2	0	4	19	16	+3	6
Germany	6	1	0	5	12	29	–17	3
England	6	0	0	6	4	79	–75	0

=== 1st Day ===
9 September 2012; 15:30
9 September 2012; 15:30	Spain	7 – 0	Germany	Pavilhão Municipal Rota dos Móveis, Paredes

9 September 2012; 17:15
9 September 2012; 17:15	England	0 – 9	Italy	Pavilhão Municipal Rota dos Móveis, Paredes

9 September 2012; 22:30
9 September 2012; 22:30	Portugal	3 – 1	Switzerland	Pavilhão Municipal Rota dos Móveis, Paredes

=== 2nd Day ===
10 September 2012; 19:00
10 September 2012; 19:00	Germany	6 – 1	England	Pavilhão Municipal Rota dos Móveis, Paredes

10 September 2012; 20:45
10 September 2012; 20:45	Spain	2 – 0	Italy	Pavilhão Municipal Rota dos Móveis, Paredes

10 September 2012; 22:30
10 September 2012; 22:30	France	3 – 7	Portugal	Pavilhão Municipal Rota dos Móveis, Paredes

=== 3rd Day ===
11 September 2012; 19:00
11 September 2012; 19:00	Switzerland	2 – 3	France	Pavilhão Municipal Rota dos Móveis, Paredes

11 September 2012; 20:45
11 September 2012; 20:45	England	1 – 21	Spain	Pavilhão Municipal Rota dos Móveis, Paredes

11 September 2012; 22:30
11 September 2012; 22:30	Portugal	3 – 0	Italy	Pavilhão Municipal Rota dos Móveis, Paredes

=== 4th Day ===
12 September 2012; 19:00
12 September 2012; 19:00	Switzerland	13 – 0	England	Pavilhão Municipal Rota dos Móveis, Paredes

12 September 2012; 20:45
12 September 2012; 20:45	Italy	6 – 2	Germany	Pavilhão Municipal Rota dos Móveis, Paredes

12 September 2012; 22:30
12 September 2012; 22:30	Spain	4 – 1	France	Pavilhão Municipal Rota dos Móveis, Paredes

=== 5th Day ===
13 September 2012; 19:00
13 September 2012; 19:00	Germany	0 – 2	Switzerland	Pavilhão Municipal Rota dos Móveis, Paredes

13 September 2012; 20:45
13 September 2012; 20:45	France	4 – 6	Italy	Pavilhão Municipal Rota dos Móveis, Paredes

13 September 2012; 22:30
13 September 2012; 22:30	England	1 – 23	Portugal	Pavilhão Municipal Rota dos Móveis, Paredes
13 September 2012; 22:30	Owen Stewart			Pavilhão Municipal Rota dos Móveis, Paredes

=== 6th Day ===
14 September 2012; 19:00
14 September 2012; 19:00	France	7 – 1	England	Pavilhão Municipal Rota dos Móveis, Paredes

14 September 2012; 20:45
14 September 2012; 20:45	Switzerland	0 – 6	Spain	Pavilhão Municipal Rota dos Móveis, Paredes

14 September 2012; 22:30
14 September 2012; 22:30	Portugal	9 – 1	Germany	Pavilhão Municipal Rota dos Móveis, Paredes

=== 7th Day ===
15 September 2012; 19:00
15 September 2012; 19:00	Germany	3 – 4	France	Pavilhão Municipal Rota dos Móveis, Paredes

15 September 2012; 20:45
15 September 2012; 20:45	Switzerland	1 – 4	Italy	Pavilhão Municipal Rota dos Móveis, Paredes

15 September 2012; 22:30
15 September 2012; 22:30	Spain	5 – 4	Portugal	Pavilhão Municipal Rota dos Móveis, Paredes
