= Montreux HC =

- Full name: Montreux Hockey Club
- League: LNA
- Founded: 1911; 114 years ago
- Home ground: Salle du Pierrier (Capacity 1,705)
- Website: montreux-hockey.com
Home	Away

Montreux Hockey Club is a roller hockey team from Montreux, Switzerland. It plays in the Swiss LNA. Montreux hosts the Nations Cup, and has it won five times, most recently in 1941.

== History ==
Montreux HC was founded in 1911, becoming the first roller hockey club in Switzerland.

The club found major success between 1924 and 1966, winning 40 of the 43 first Swiss leagues. After league victories in 1968, and 1974–1975, a second golden era emerged between 1981 and 1987, winning five of the six leagues played between those years. In 2017, 30 years after their last title, Montreux won their 50th league title.

== Trophies ==
- 50 Swiss Championship victories
- 5 Nations Cup victories
