= Ricardo Oliveira (roller hockey) =

Ricardo do Carmo Oliveira, also known by the playing name of Caio (born 5 January 1982, in Vila Nova de Gaia), is a Portuguese roller hockey player. He plays as a forward.

Caio first youth team was Gulpilhares, where he started playing in 1996/97, being promoted to the first team in 2001/02. In 2003/04, Caio moved to FC Porto, where he stayed two seasons, winning two titles of the National Championship. He played the seasons of 2005/06 and 2006/07 at Óquei de Barcelos, returning to FC Porto, in 2007/08. After two seasons he moved to Benfica in 2009/10. He won the Cup of Portugal the same season. He left in 2011/2012, returning to FC Porto.

He is one of the most emblematic players for Portugal, being a member of the squad that lost the 2002, 2008 and 2010 Rink Hockey European Championship finals. He also played in the team that reached the 3rd place in the 2009 Rink Hockey World Championship. He was the top scorer of the 2010 Rink Hockey European Championship, with 14 goals.
