= Nations Cup (roller hockey) =

Roller hockey tournament in Switzerland

- Current season, competition or edition: 68th Nations Cup
- Sport: Roller hockey
- Founded: 1921; 105 years ago
- Claim to fame: Oldest roller hockey competition in the world
- No. of teams: 8
- Country: Switzerland
- Venue: 1
- Most recent champion: Argentina (5th title)
- Most titles: Portugal (19 titles)

The Nations Cup is the oldest and one of the most important roller hockey tournaments in the world. It is played every two years in the city of Montreux, in Switzerland. The last edition was the 68th and took place in April 2019.

== Results ==
=== Summaries ===
Edition	Year	(gold) Gold	(silver) Silver	(bronze) Bronze	Other designations
1	1921	(Switzerland) Montreux HC	(Germany) Stuttgart RC		Easter Cup
2	1922	(Switzerland) Montreux HC	(France) Paris HC		Easter Cup
3	1923	England	(Switzerland) Montreux HC		Easter Cup
4	1924	England	Switzerland	France	Non-Official European Championship
5	1925	England	Switzerland	France	Non-Official European Championship
6	1926	(France) Stade Bordeaux	(Switzerland) Montreux HC		Montreux Tournament
7	1927	England	France	Switzerland	European Championship
8	1929	England	Italy	France	European Championship
9	1930	(England) Faversham V	(France) Stade Bordeaux	(Germany) Stuttgart RC	Montreux Tournament
10	1931	England	France	Switzerland	European Championship
11	1932	(England) Herne Bay RHC	(Germany) Stuttgart RC	(Switzerland) Montreux HC	
12	1933	(Germany) Stuttgart RC	(Switzerland) Montreux HC	(France) Stade Bordeaux	Montreux Tournament
13	1934	(Switzerland) Montreux HC	(Germany) Stuttgart RC	(Switzerland) Genève RHC	Montreux Tournament
14	1935	Italy Juniors	(Switzerland) Montreux HC	(Italy) Dopolavoro Ferroviario	Montreux Tournament
15	1935	(Switzerland) Montreux HC	(Italy) Dopolavoro Ferroviario		Easter Cup
16	1937	Germany	Italy Juniors	France	
17	1938	(England) Herne Bay RHC	Italy North	Switzerland	
18	1939	England	Italy	Portugal	World Championship
19	1941	(Switzerland) Montreux HC	(France) RHC Lyon		Easter Cup
20	1946	(Italy) HC Monza	(Portugal) Lisbon V	(Belgium) Antwerp V	
21	1947	(Portugal) Lisbon V	(England) Herne Bay RHC	(Italy) HC Monza	
22	1948	Portugal	England	Italy	World Championship, European Championship
23	1949	Portugal	(Spain) Espanyol	(Switzerland) Montreux HC	
24	1950	England	Portugal	Italy B	
25	1951	Belgium	(Switzerland) Montreux HC	England	
26	1952	Spain	Portugal	(Switzerland) Montreux HC	
27	1953	(Spain) Espanyol	Portugal	Italy B	
28	1954	Portugal	(Switzerland) Montreux HC	Italy B	
29	1955	Portugal	Spain	Italy B	
30	1956	Portugal	Spain	(Switzerland) Montreux HC	
31	1957	Spain	Portugal	Italy	
32	1958	(Portugal) (Mozambique) GD Lourenço Marques	Spain	(Switzerland) Montreux HC	
33	1959	Spain	Portugal	(Switzerland) Montreux HC	
34	1960	Spain	Portugal	Italy	
35	1961	(Spain) CP Voltregà	(Portugal) Benfica	(Italy) Amatori Modena	
36	1962	(Portugal) Benfica	(Italy) HC Monza	England	
37	1963	Portugal	Spain	(Switzerland) Montreux HC	
38	1964	Spain	(Switzerland) Montreux HC	West Germany	
39	1965	Portugal	Spain	Italy	
40	1967	Spain	(Switzerland) Montreux HC	Netherlands	
41	1968	Portugal	Spain	(Switzerland) Montreux HC	
42	1970	Portugal	(Spain) CP Voltregà	Italy	
43	1971	Spain	(Portugal) Lisbon V	France	
44	1973	Portugal	Spain	Netherlands	
45	1975	Spain	Portugal	Italy	
46	1976	Spain	Portugal	West Germany	
47	1978	Spain	Portugal	West Germany	
48	1980	Spain	Argentina	Netherlands	
49	1982	Italy	Argentina	Portugal	
50	1984	Portugal	(Spain) Reus Deportiu	West Germany	
51	1987	Portugal	Argentina	United States	
52	1989	Argentina	(Italy) Hockey Novara	Portugal	
53	1991	Spain	Portugal	Italy	
54	1993	Argentina	(Italy) Roller Monza	(Spain) CP Tordera	
55	1994	Portugal	Italy	Spain	
56	1995	(Spain) FC Barcelona	Portugal	Argentina	
57	1997	Portugal	Spain	(Italy) Amatori Vercelli	
58	1999	Spain	Portugal	(Switzerland) Montreux HC	
59	2001	Spain	Portugal	Italy	
60	2003	Spain	Portugal	France	
61	2005	Spain	Portugal	(Italy) Hockey Prato	
62	2007	Spain	Portugal	Switzerland	
63	2009	Portugal	Spain	Argentina	
64	2011	Portugal	Spain	Argentina	
65	2013	Portugal	Spain	Angola	
66	2015	Portugal	Spain	Italy	
67	2017	Argentina	Portugal	Spain	
68	2019	Portugal	Argentina	Italy	
69	2024	Argentina	Portugal	France	
70	2026	Argentina	Italy	Portugal	

=== Ranking ===
National/Club Team	Championships
Portugal	19
Spain	17
England	8
Argentina	5
(Switzerland) Montreux Hockey Club	5
Germany	1
(England) Herne Bay RHC	2
Italy	1
Italy (juniors)	1
(England) Faversham HC	1
(Germany) Stuttgart HC	1
(France) Stade Bordeaux UC	1
(Italy) HC Monza	1
(Portugal) Lisbon	1
(Portugal) Lourenco Marques	1
Belgium	1
(Spain) CP Voltregà	1
(Portugal) Benfica	1
(Spain) FC Barcelona	1
(Spain) RCD Español	1
Total	69
