= Jordi Bargalló =

Spanish rink hockey player

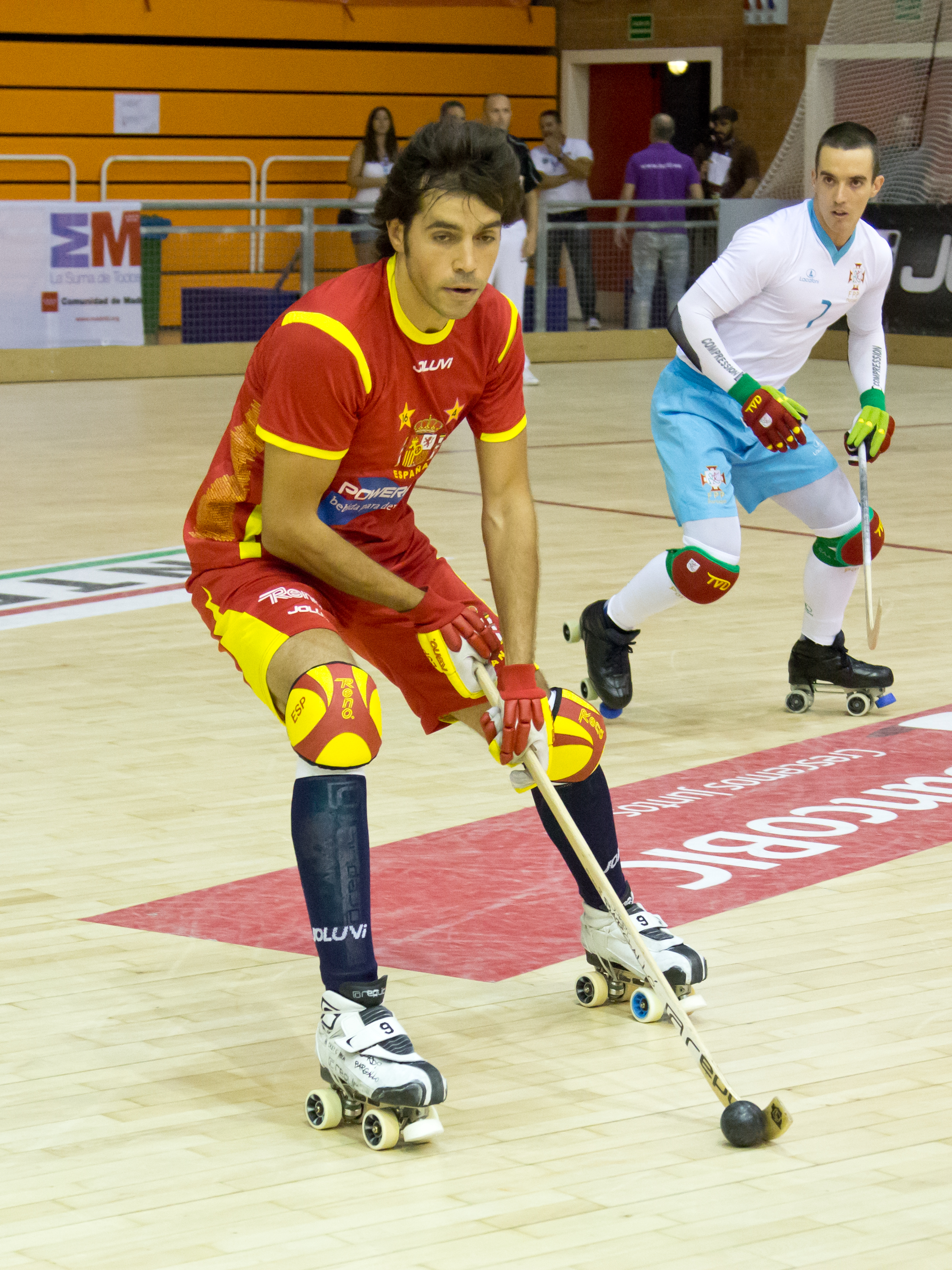
Jordi Bargalló

Jordi Bargalló i Poch (born 5 December 1979, in Sant Sadurní d'Anoia) is a Spanish rink hockey player. He plays as a midfielder.

== Club career ==
Bargalló first played at Noia Freixenet, from 1997/98 to 2001/02, where he won the Copa del Rey, in 1998, and the Cers Cup, in 1998. He moved then to HC Liceo La Coruña, where he stayed from 2002/03 to 2006/07. He was European Champion in 2002/03, and won the Copa del Rey in 2004. After a season at Igualada HC (2007/08), he returned to Liceo La Coruña in 2008/09. In 2016, he moved to Portehuese club UD Oliveirense. He won a Continental Cup (2017) and a Portuguese Cup (2018/19) with UD Oliveirense. In 2021, He returned to his former club Noia Freixenet.

== International career ==
He is a leading name for Spain, being a member of their winning squads at the Rink Hockey World Championship in 2005, 2009, 2011 and 2013, and at the Rink Hockey European Championship, in 2006, 2008, 2010 and 2012. He was also a winner of the Cup of Nations in 2005.
