= Ricardo Barreiros =

Portuguese former roller hockey player (born 1982)

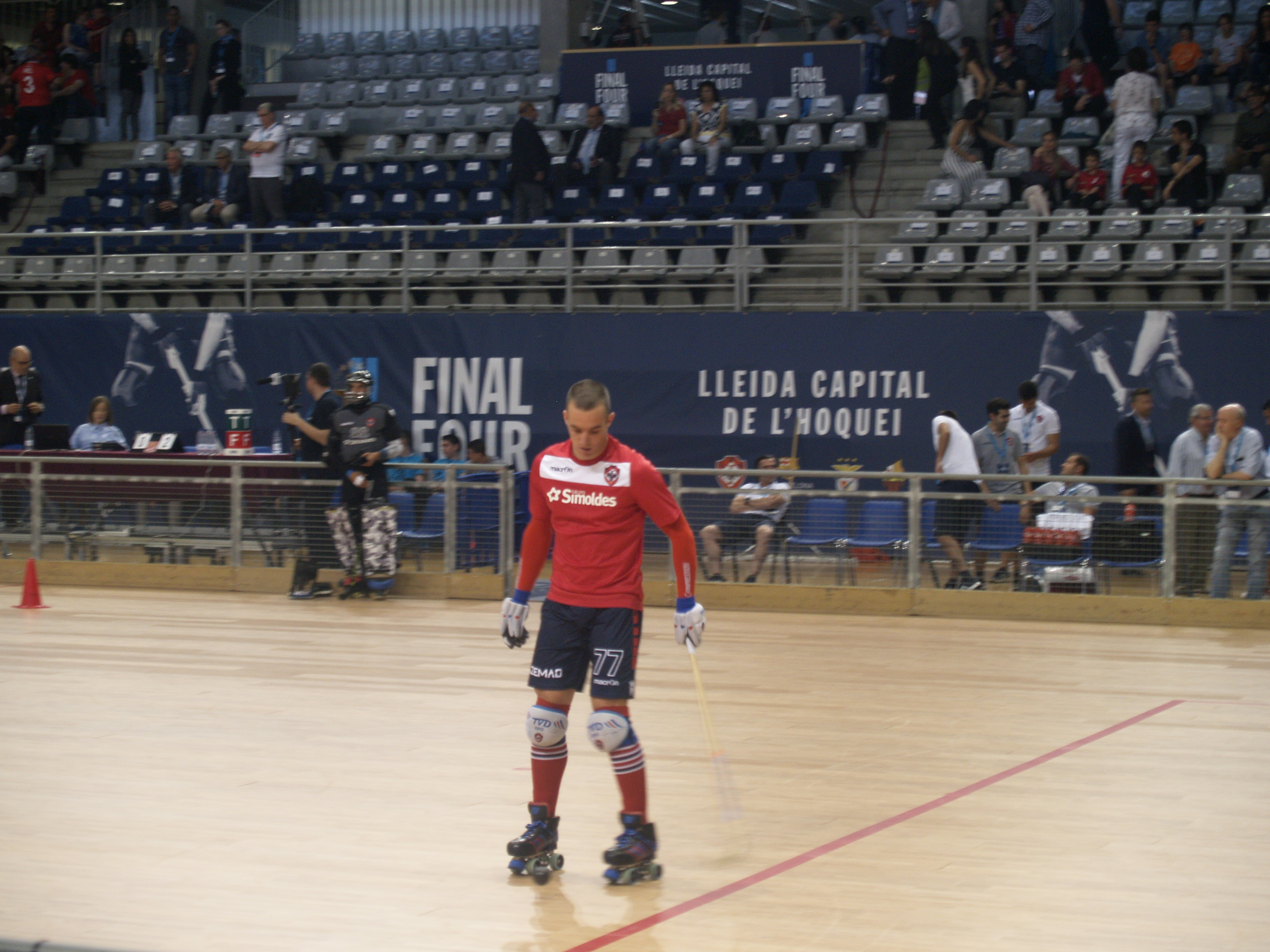
- Barreiros with Oliveirense in 2017

Personal information
- Full name: Ricardo Jorge Silva Barreiros
- Nationality: Portuguese
- Born: 17 January 1982 (age 44) Sintra, Portugal
- Years active: 2001–
- Height: 1.82 m (5 ft 11 1/2 in)
- Weight: 85 kg (187 lb)

Sport
- Country: Portugal
- Sport: Roller hockey
- Team: Paço d'Arcos (2001–2004); Benfica (2004–2009); HC Liceo (2009–2012); FC Porto (2012–2015); Oliveirense (2015–2020); Paço d'Arcos (2020–2023)

Ricardo Jorge Silva Barreiros (born Sintra, 17 January 1982) is a Portuguese former roller hockey player. He played as a midfielder and as a forward. He's considered one of the best roller hockey players.

== Career ==
Barreiros played first at CD Paço d'Arcos, being promoted to the first category in 2001/02. He was assigned for Benfica for the season of 2004/2005. He played four seasons for the "Eagles" rink hockey team but never won the National Championship. He moved to Liceo da Coruña, in Spain, where he played from 2009/10 to 2011/12. Barreiros returned to Portugal to play for FC Porto in 2012/13.

Barreiros is a usual player for Portugal, having his first game in 2003. He played in the Rink Hockey World Championship, in 2005, 2007, 2009, 2011 and 2013, and in the Rink Hockey European Championship, in 2004, 2006, 2008, 2010 and 2012. He achieved his greatest success by now at the 2008 Rink Hockey European Championship, where Portugal reached the 2nd place, losing narrowly the final to Spain by 1-0. He was also the top scorer of the competition with 10 goals.
