= Germany national roller hockey team =

Germany
- Association: German Roller Sports Federation
- Confederation: CERH
- Head coach: Sven Steup
- Captain: Thomas Haupt

Ranking
- Ranking: 11

== Germany squad – 64th Nations Cup ==
Goaltenders
#	Player	Hometown	Club
1	Philip Leyer		RSC Darmstadt
	Sebastian Wilk		RSC Cronenberg
Field Players
#	Player	Hometown	Club
	Liam Hages		ERG Iserlohn
	Lucas Karschau		SK Germania Herringen
	Benjamin Nusch		RSC Cronenberg
	Kay Hövelmann		RESG Walsum
	Thomas Haupt (Captain)		RSC Cronenberg
	Yannick Peinke		IGR Remscheid
	Mark Wochnik		RSC Cronenberg
	Andreas Paczia		RSC Cronenberg

Team Staff

- General Manager: Björn Siebel
- General Manager: Christian Baumgart
- Physiotherapist: Nadine Schlesinger

Coaching Staff

- Head Coach: Sven Steup
- Assistant: Martin Schmahl

== Titles ==
- B Roller Hockey World Cup (1):1986
