= World Skate Europe Rink Hockey =

Roller hockey competition

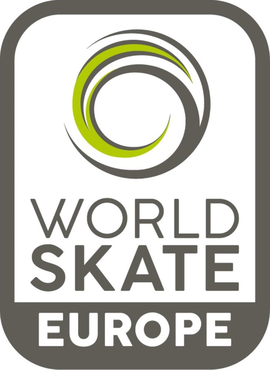
Logo of World Skate Europe

The World Skate Europe Rink Hockey, formerly known as Comité Européen de Rink-Hockey, is a technical committee within World Skate Europe responsible for the governing of rink hockey (or roller hockey) in Europe.

== Competitions ==
=== National teams ===
Men

- European Roller Hockey Championship
- European Roller Hockey Juvenile Championship (U-23)
- WSE European U-23 Roller Hockey Championship
- European Roller Hockey Junior Championship (U-19)
- European Roller Hockey Juvenile Championship (U-17)

Women

- European Women's Roller Hockey Championship
- European Women's Roller Hockey Junior Championship (U-20)
- European Women's Roller Hockey Juvenile Championship (U-17)

=== Clubs ===
- WSE Champions League
- WSE Cup
- WSE Trophy
- WSE Continental Cup
- WSE Women's Champions League
- WSE Women's Cup
- Under 17 Female Club European Rink Hockey Tournament
- EVRICup

=== National Rink Hockey leagues ===
- Austria
- Belgium
- England
- France
- Germany
- Italy
- Israel
- Netherlands
- Portugal
- Spain
- Spain women's
- Switzerland

== See also ==
- Roller hockey rankings
- Nations Cup
