= Maidstone Roller Hockey Club =

YMCA Maidstone RHC
- Full name: YMCA Maidstone Roller Hockey Club
- Short name: Maidstone
- Founded: 1973
- Ground: YMCA Leisure Centre; Maidstone, Kent, England
- Capacity: 200
- President: (England) Dr. Roy Wheatley
- Manager: (England) Tommy Harbord
- League: National Division One
- 2011–12: National Division One, 5th
- Website: http://www.maidstonerinkhockey.co.uk

YMCA Maidstone Roller Hockey Club is a roller hockey club located in Kent, England. It has won three National Cup titles, regularly competing at the highest level in the country over the last few decades.

Maidstone train at the local YMCA Leisure Centre in Loose, Maidstone, Kent, returning to their newly refurbished home after a long period away from it.

Currently Maidstone Roller Hockey Club are competing in National Division One, the second highest national league competition in England, for the second year running. In the 2011-12 Season they finished in fifth place.

Maidstone RHC have had many notable teams over the years including the group of players who won three National Cups and various Premier League runners-up medals, the Bombers youth team and various England internationals.

== History ==
=== The Birth of Maidstone RHC ===
Maidstone Roller Hockey Club had its first practice session at the YMCA, Maidstone on Christmas Eve 1972. Before this time some general skaters from the 'Y' were taken by Dave Brewer to Rochester Casino where they saw Roller Hockey for the first time. Rochester United had a very strong team at that time including Peter Wimble who later gave his name to the Veterans' Cup. Maidstone joined the long-established Kent League and newly formed National League in 1973/74. The original team of Dave Brewer, Martin Waller, Tony Spiel, Gerald Klaus, Glen Spiel, Paul Howard and Gary Howard won Division IV at their first attempt. Strengthened by two additional players from Herne Bay, Dave Walters and Brian Hendy (see photo) they won Division III of the National League in 1975/76

The Club had attracted younger players and thus started a period of rapid growth. The first AGM of the club was held at the 'Y' Centre on 12 December 1979. It had been an important year for the Club. Peter Haynes had played in goal for the National Junior side (captained by Stuart Doherty - see later) at Herne Bay and had beaten the Portuguese National Side. Roy Wheatley who had played for 30 years for Herne Bay United and had signed for Maidstone in 1978 captained the first team to win the National League Division II and was elected National Secretary. Most importantly of the Juniors were British Champions and the Schoolboys and Minors all did well.

The first committee was Chairman Roy Wheatley, Secretary Dave Brewer, Treasurer Dave Finis and 4 player representatives Nic Morton, Peter Haynes, Rob Duchesne and Russell Howard.

From 1979 the Maidstone Club produced a succession of international players at all levels especially at the younger age groups.

At the 1982 AGM it was decided to rearrange the teams and the old Junior players, most of them international players, became the first team. The second team were the older players from the first team plus up and coming youngsters notably Andrew and Pat Finnis.

During this period, before the Superleague started, Maidstone had two teams in National Division I and they won National Division III South, as well as having teams in the Kent League.

More to Follow...

== Titles ==
National Cup Winners: 1990, 1997 and 1999

== Current squad ==
The first team, which will compete in the 2012-13 National Division One and National Cup, is as follows:

- Dan Otway-Ruthven (Goalkeeper)
- Luke Jarvis (Goalkeeper)
- Rich Adams
- Ian Bates
- Nick Beal
- Olly Birch
- Dean Foreman
- Jo Gotts
- Tommy Harbord (Captain/Player Coach)
- Scott Howard
- Julio Mata
- Angelo Moutinho

Coach: (England) Tommy Harbord

== Competitions ==
In the 2012-13 Season Maidstone RHC will be competing for the second year running in National Division One and the National Cup. The previous season saw the Club finish in 5th place in ND1 and knocked out in the first round of the Cup by eventual winners Middlesbrough RHC.

This season the teams for National Division One remain the same besides one movement, which sees local rivals Herne Bay RHC replaced by East Grinstead RHC where various Maidstone players used to play following the Club's collapse in 2006.

The teams in National Division One can be seen on the England Roller Hockey page.
