= England Roller Hockey =

- Abbreviation: ERH
- Formation: 1896
- Legal status: Amateur
- Headquarters: England
- Location: England
- Region served: North, East, South East
- Members: 21 Clubs
- Official language: English
- General Secretary: Emma Thomas - General Secretary
- President: (England) Alan Adams
- National Development Director: (Portugal) Carlos Amaral
- Key people: Michaela Parfitt - Treasurer, Andy Whitton - Marketing Secretary, Arran Bowyer - National Teams & Coaching Director, Ana Martins - Competitions Secretary,
- Main organ: National Executive Committee
- Affiliations: World Skate Europe (Europe)
- Website: England Roller Hockey Official Website

ERHPremier League
- Current season, competition or edition: 2026-27
- First season: 1974
- Most recent champion: King's Lynn RHC (10th title - Consecutive)
- Most titles: Herne Bay United (16 titles)
- Website: https://www.englandrollerhockey.org

National Cup
- First season: 1930
- Most recent champion: King's Lynn RHC (4th title)
- Most titles: Herne Bay RHC (32 titles)

England Roller Hockey, which originated in England, is a game played on roller-skates with a ball and stick. It was first played at The Lava Rink in Denmark Hill, London in 1885. The National Rink Hockey Association of England (NRHA) is the roller hockey governing body in England.

== History and development ==
Roller hockey, originally called "rink hockey," was established in 1896, making it one of the oldest sports recognised associations. It consisted of 10 men on each side, and the first roller hockey games were played with a tennis ball and ordinary walking sticks, or sometimes even old umbrella handles.

During the infancy of the game, the sport built up very rapidly, with many teams starting in the London area. New associations were created for the southern and the northern parts of the country. Whilst roller hockey is still a minority sport throughout the world, it has been developed by many European countries into a well-paid, professional sport. In England, though, after its promising start, roller hockey has declined. Its number of registered players increase in line with the skating trend.

Aside from the professional development director, Carlos Amaral, the association is entirely amateur. The England roller hockey team has been a FIRS World Championship winner twice (in 1936 and 1939, when the championships were also contested as the European Championships) and CERH European Championship winner 12 times. The national teams take part in U17, U20, Men's and Women's competitions both in Europe and at the World Roller Games, organised by World Skate.

The major competition in English roller hockey is the NRHA Premier League, which has seen both Southsea RHC and Herne Bay United dominate in previous decades. The secondary tournament in England is the National Cup (seniors), in which Herne Bay RHC holds the record for most wins.

The NRHA is divided into three regions: Northern Counties (NCRHA), Eastern Counties (ECRHA) and South Eastern Counties (SECRHA).

== England Roller Hockey and the NRHA ==
England Roller Hockey is the national association for roller hockey across the country. It is registered as The National Roller Hockey Association of England (NRHA).

In Britain, roller hockey forms one of seven roller sport disciplines affiliated with the British Roller Sports Federation (BRSF), which is recognised as the national governing body (NGB) of all the disciplines. The sport of roller hockey was governed by the Fédération Internationale de Roller Sports (FIRS) through its affiliate, the Comité Internationale de Rink-Hockey (CIRH), which is recognised by the International Olympic Committee (IOC). Following the Extraordinary Congress resolution in September 2017 in Nanjing (China), the FIRS has changed its denomination to World Skate, the first step towards a managerial set up attentive to the needs of its base.

The day-to-day operations of the NRHA are conducted by its executive committee members, with their sub-committees, which are elected every four years at the Annual General Meeting of the Association (AGM). The committee consists of the president, general secretary, treasurer, competitors, officials, and marketing.

In addition, the presidents (or their authorised representatives) of each affiliated region of the NRHA also sit on the association's executive committee.

Although roller hockey is an English creation, it is most popular in Latin countries such as Spain, Portugal, Italy and Argentina, where it is played professionally by clubs including as FC Barcelona, FC Porto and SL Benfica.

== The regions ==
=== Northern Counties ===
The Northern Counties Roller Hockey Association is the regional body within the National Roller Hockey Association of England, which covers the northern counties of England, including Greater Manchester, Yorkshire and Lincolnshire. Notable clubs include Middlesbrough RHC, Manchester RHC and Grimsby RHC. While there have been many clubs in Northern England since the NRHA began in 1896, it now features just 7 clubs, including Plymouth.

Until recently Northern Counties representatives had great success in men's senior roller hockey with Middlesbrough and Grimsby winning the Premier League and National Cup in recent seasons.

==== List of clubs ====
Grimsby RHC, Manchester RSC, Middlesbrough RHC, Plymouth RHC, RHC Sheffield, and Sheffield Wildcats RHC .

=== Eastern Counties ===
The Eastern Counties Roller Hockey Association, historically the least successful, is currently the most decorated affiliation to the NRHA. It has the most clubs and members out of the three regions, and covers counties including Norfolk, Suffolk, Cambridgeshire and Hertfordshire. Its most famous clubs include King's Lynn who have won the Premier League four seasons in a row and Letchworth.

==== List of clubs ====
Cambridge & Cottenham RHC, Colchester RHC, Ely & Chesterton United RHC, King's Lynn RHC, Letchworth RHC, Norwich City RHC, Peterborough RHC, Skaters RHC, and Soham RHC.

=== South Eastern Counties ===
The South Eastern Counties is the most prolific region, conceding 29 out of 44 Premier League titles and 70 of the 85 National Cup titles. Herne Bay RHC dominated English roller hockey for much of its early existence, competing at the legendary Pier Pavilion, which was demolished in 2011. Their success was followed mostly by Hampshire club, Southsea RHC, and later Herne Bay United, which dominated the Premier League championships up until 2010.

Other notable South Eastern Counties clubs include Maidstone RHC and the newly formed London RHC.

==== List of clubs ====
Farnham RHC, Herne Bay RHC, Herne Bay United RH&SC, RHC Invicta, Maidstone RHC.

== World championships ==
In the early World Championships, England was successful in winning the first two tournaments:

European and World Championship
Year	Host city (cities)	(gold) Gold	(silver) Silver	(bronze) Bronze	4th Place
1936	(Germany) Stuttgart	England	Italy	Portugal	Switzerland
1939	(Switzerland) Montreux	England	Italy	Portugal	Belgium

However, following World War II, England had no success in the World Championships, apart from a second-placed finish in the 1948 games in Montreux, Switzerland.

In the modern game, the World Championships are split into two categories. The World "A" Championships contest is contested by the best teams in the world, while the World "B' Championships, contested every other year to the World A's, see the top three finishers qualify to compete in the World A's the following year in a relegation/promotion system. England usually fights to remain in the World A's, or is relegated and fights for promotion. The national team has finished not higher than 13th in the World A's in many years, although they have been regular contenders in the World A's.

In the 2011 FIRS Men's Roller Hockey World Cup in San Juan, Argentina, England finished in 15th place and competed in the 2012 FIRS Men's B-Roller Hockey World Cup in Canelones, Uruguay. Since 2017, English teams (Men's /Women's/U20 Men's) have represented their country in the World Championships at the World Roller Games organised by World Skate

== European championships ==
England had great success in the early tournaments of the European championships, winning 12 titles. However, after World War II, although England attained one second-placed finish in 1948 and two fourth-placed finishes in 1957 and 1959, they have struggled to make any real international impact for many years on the European stage, which has been predominantly dominated by Spain, Portugal and Italy.

=== Senior competitions ===
Year	Host city	(gold) Gold	(silver) Silver	(bronze) Bronze	4th Place
1926	(England) Herne Bay	England	France	Germany	Switzerland
1927	(Switzerland) Montreux	England	France	Switzerland	Germany
1928	(England) Herne Bay	England	France	Germany	Switzerland
1929	(Switzerland) Montreux	England	Italy	France	Germany
1930	(England) Herne Bay	England	France	Germany	Switzerland
1931	(Switzerland) Montreux	England	France	Switzerland	Italy
1932	(England) Herne Bay	England	Germany	France	Portugal
1934	(England) Herne Bay	England	Germany	Switzerland	Italy
1936^{[1]}	(Germany) Stuttgart	England	Italy	Portugal	Switzerland
1937	(England) Herne Bay	England	Switzerland	Portugal	Italy
1938	(Belgium) Antwerp	England	Italy	Belgium	Portugal
1939^{[1]}	(Switzerland) Montreux	England	Italy	Portugal	Belgium
1947^{[1]}	(Portugal) Lisbon	Portugal	Belgium	Spain	Italy
1948^{[1]}	(Switzerland) Montreux	Portugal	England	Italy	Spain

=== Junior competitions ===
Year	Host city	Category	(gold) Gold	(silver) Silver	(bronze) Bronze	4th Place
2023	(Italy) Correggio	Under 17 Ladies	Portugal	England	Italy	Germany

== National teams ==
The National teams represent England at the following levels in the European competitions organised by World Skate - Europe. The Men's team, the Women's team and the Under 19 Men's also compete at the World Championships held at the World Roller Games organised by World Skate.

- Senior Male
- Senior Female
- Under 19 Male
- Under 17 Male
- Under 17 Female

== Premier League ==
=== History of winners ===
Year	Champion	Year	Champion
1973–74	Wolverhampton	1996–97	Herne Bay United
1974–75	Wolverhampton	1997–98	Herne Bay United
1975–76	Folkestone	1998–99	Halifax
1976–77	–	1999–00	Herne Bay United
1977–78	Wolverhampton	2000–01	Herne Bay United
1978–79	Middlesbrough	2001–02	Herne Bay United
1979–80	Middlesbrough	2002–03	Herne Bay United
1980–81	Southsea	2003–04	Herne Bay United
1981–82	Southsea	2004–05	Bury St. Edmunds
1982–83	Southsea	2005–06	Herne Bay United
1983–84	Southsea	2006–07	Herne Bay United
1984–85	Southsea	2007–08	Herne Bay United
1985–86	Southsea	2008–09	Herne Bay United
1986–87	Southsea	2009–10	Herne Bay United
1987–88	Southsea	2010–11	Middlesbrough
1988–89	Southsea	2011–12	Grimsby
1989–90	Southsea	2012–13	Middlesbrough
1990–91	Southsea	2013–14	Grimsby
1991–92	Southsea	2014–15	Grimsby
1992–93	Herne Bay United	2015–16	King's Lynn
1993–94	Herne Bay United	2016–17	King's Lynn
1994–95	Herne Bay United	2017–18	King's Lynn
1995–96	Herne Bay United	2018–19	King's Lynn
2019–20	King's Lynn	2020–21	N/A - Season abandoned
2021–22	King's Lynn	2022–23	King's Lynn
2023–24	King's Lynn	2024–25	King's Lynn
2025-26	King's Lynn		

=== History of winners (Female Premier League) ===
Year	Champion
2023–24	Ely & Chesterton United RHC
2024-25	Middlesbrough RHC
2025-26	King's Lynn RHC

=== No. of championships by team ===
Team	Championships
Herne Bay United	16
Southsea	12
King's Lynn	10
Middlesbrough	4
Grimsby	3
Wolverhampton	3
Bury St Edmunds	1
Folkestone	1
Halifax	1
TOTAL	50

=== 2019–2020 season ===
View the Premier League 2019–20 Season here.

The clubs that are competing in the Premier League 2019 - 2020 Season are: Ely and Chesterton United, Grimsby, Herne Bay, King's Lynn, London, Manchester, Middlesbrough, Peterborough and Soham. The top tier of English rink hockey is the Premier League consisting of 9 teams playing single match home/away format hockey.

The second tier of English rink hockey was National Division 1. It was played on a tournament basis where teams play twice a tournament, with a total of 10 games in the season. In 2018-19 ECU won the right to move up to the National Premier League, with Herne Bay also making the move up. The clubs that are competing in the National Division 1 2019 - 2020 Season were: Cambridge and Cottenham RHC, Ely & Chesterton United RHC, Farnham RHC, Letchworth RHC, RHC Invicta and Spen Valley Flyers RHC.

== National Cup ==
=== History of winners ===
Year	Winner	Year	Winner	Year	Winner	Year	Winner	Year	Winner
1930	Herne Bay	1952	Herne Bay	1974	Herne United	1996	Herne Bay United	2018	Soham
1931	Herne Bay	1953	Herne Bay	1975	Folkestone	1997	Maidstone	2019	King's Lynn
1932	Herne Bay	1954	Great Harwood	1976	Southsea	1998	Letchworth	2023	King’s Lynn
1933	Herne Bay	1955	Herne Bay	1977	Southsea	1999	Maidstone	2024	King’s Lynn
1934	Herne Bay	1956	Herne Bay	1978	Herne Bay	2000	Herne Bay United	2025	RHC Invicta
1935	Herne Bay United	1957	Great Harwood	1979	Herne Bay	2001	Herne Bay United	2026	King's Lynn
1936	Herne Bay	1958	Herne Bay	1980	Southsea	2002	Herne Bay United		
1937	Herne Bay United	1959	Rochester	1981	Southsea	2003	Herne Bay United		
1938	Herne Bay	1960	Rochester	1982	Southsea	2004	Herne Bay United		
1939	Herne Bay	1961	Birchpark	1983	Southsea	2005	Letchworth		
1940	Herne Bay	1962	Alexandra Palace	1984	Herne Bay	2006	Herne Bay United		
1941	Herne Bay	1963	Herne Bay	1985	Southsea	2007	Herne Bay United		
1942	Herne Bay	1964	Wolverhampton	1986	Southsea	2008	Herne Bay United		
1943	Herne Bay	1965	Wolverhampton	1987	Southsea	2009	Herne Bay United		
1944	Herne Bay	1966	Folkestone	1988	Southsea	2010	Middlesbrough		
1945	Herne Bay	1967	Folkestone	1989	Southsea	2011	Herne Bay United		
1946	Herne Bay	1968	Folkestone	1990	Maidstone	2012	Middlesbrough		
1947	Herne Bay	1969	Bury St. Edmunds	1991	Southsea	2013	Grimsby		
1948	Herne Bay	1970	Wolverhampton	1992	Herne Bay	2014	Grimsby		
1949	Herne Bay	1971	Wolverhampton	1993	Herne Bay	2015	Middlesbrough		
1950	Herne Bay	1972	Wolverhampton	1994	Herne Bay	2016	Middlesbrough		
1951	Herne Bay	1973	Southsea	1995	Middlesbrough	2017	Middlesbrough		

=== Number of English cups by team ===
Team	Cups
Herne Bay RHC	32
Herne Bay United	14
Southsea	13
Wolverhampton	5
Middlesbrough RHC	5
Folkestone	4
Maidstone	3
King's Lynn	4
Bury St Edmunds	2
Rochester	2
Great Harwood	2
Grimsby	2
Letchworth	1
Alexandra Palace	1
Birchpark	1
Soham	1
TOTAL	91
