= USA Roller Sports =

Sports governing body

USA Roller Sports (USARS), formerly the United States Amateur Confederation of Roller Skating, is the national governing body of competitive roller sports (inline skating and roller skating) in the United States. It is recognized by the World Skate and the United States Olympic Committee.

USA Roller Sports has sponsored amateur roller skating competitions at the regional and national level since 1937 in figure skating, speed skating and roller hockey; and since 2011 in roller derby. USARS has been the United States representative for the International Federation of Roller Sports (FIRS) since 1972, when it obtained this designation after the merger of two predecessor roller skating federations (the Roller Skating Rink Operators' Association or RSROA established in 1937, and the U. S. Amateur Roller Skating Association, or USARSA). The organization exercises jurisdiction over matters pertaining to the participation of United States roller skaters in international competition, including existing or potential Pan American Games and Olympic Games participation.

USA Hockey Inline was one of two governing bodies for the sport of inline hockey in the United States. It was created in December 1994 by USA Hockey. On May 10, 2011, USA Hockey announced that it was terminating its inline program, and that all inline hockey memberships would expire on August 31, 2011, and encouraged USA Hockey inline members to transfer to USARS.

== Roller sports disciplines ==
In its bylaws, USARS acknowledges "artistic", "speed", "roller derby" and "hockey" discipline categories. Its membership application for individuals, however, includes the following categories:

- "figure" refers to roller figure skating, including singles, pairs, dance, figure, and precision
- "speed" refers to inline speed skating
- "roller derby" was accepted as an official discipline in 2011
- "rink hockey" refers to quad skate roller hockey
- "inline hockey" refers to inline skate roller hockey
- "recreation" refers to fitness skating and jam skating (recreational dance skating)
- "aggressive" refers to skateboarding and aggressive inline skating

USARS also accepts organizations (teams and leagues) and noncompeting members (coaches and officials, typically).

== Competitions Organized ==
The USA Roller Sports is responsible for many competitions taking place each year. One of the biggest is USA Rink Hockey National Championship.

== Olympic status ==
The sport is part of the Pan American Games and the World Games and is noted as an Olympic Recognized sport. In 2005, the International Olympic Committee selected Roller Sports among four other sports for consideration into the Olympic Games. In particular, Inline Speedskating was chosen and submitted for consideration. In the 1990s, hockey was slated as a demonstration sport but was never added as a full-fledged member of the Olympic Games' program.

FIRS President Aracu has recently set up a multimedia site to make rollerskating sports more visible to the IOC. Enter that site from http://www.rollersports.tv/ So far figure rollerskating and inline speed skating are represented in online videos. Pres. Aracu also has posted on that site a few letters documenting some of the steps he has taken to promote international speed skating.

FIRS and the CIC proposed to the International Olympic Committee that inline speedskating be the rollerskating discipline presented at the 2012 Summer Games. http://olympic.patincarrera.com/eng/news.html

In February 2012 IOC President Jacques Rogge told reporters that rollersports are one of eight sports in consideration for the 2020 Olympics.

== Controversy ==
In October 2001, USA Hockey, the national governing body of ice hockey in the United States, challenged USARS jurisdiction over roller hockey; however, the United States Olympic Committee continues to reaffirm the charter of roller sports, eligible in the summer Olympics, to USA Roller Sports.

In the meantime, USA Hockey formed a separate branch called USA Hockey InLine that is also promoting inline hockey events, but did not send a national team to the FIRS Inline Hockey World Championships.

USA Hockey InLine does field its own national team, but it takes part in the IIHF Inline Hockey World Championships, a separate event operated by the International Ice Hockey Federation since 1996.

In response, USA Roller Sports aligned itself with the Amateur Athletic Union (AAU) to help with growth and legitimacy of its hockey programs.

Top roller hockey players have often shifted their allegiance from one organization to the other depending on opportunities. In some cases, players will appear at both World Championships in the same year.

On May 10, 2011, USA Hockey announced that it was terminating its inline program, and that all inline hockey memberships would expire on August 31, 2011, and encouraged USA Hockey inline members to transfer to USARS.

Since 2011, USARS has been in an ongoing controversy with the Women's Flat Track Derby Association and the affiliated Men's Roller Derby Association, with competing rules sets for playing roller derby.

== See also ==
- Ohio Speedskating Tour, oldest USARS speedskating league
- Roller hockey
- USA Rink Hockey National Championship
