= Roller hockey =

Sport discipline

Roller hockey is a form of hockey played on a dry surface using wheeled skates – either traditional roller skates (quad skates) or with inline skates – and a ball or a puck. Roller hockey is played in nearly 60 countries worldwide.

There are two major variants of organized roller hockey. Traditional roller hockey (also called rink hockey, hardball hockey, or quad hockey) is played using quad skates, curved "cane" sticks, and a ball; it is a limited-contact sport. The other variant, inline hockey, is played using inline skates, ice hockey sticks, and a puck; it is a full-contact sport, though body checks are not allowed. Most professional hockey games take place on an indoor or outdoor sport court (a type of plastic interlinking tiles used to create a skating surface). Otherwise, any dry surface can be used to host a game, typically a roller rink, macadam (asphalt), or cement.

== Variants ==
Roller hockey is played on both quad skates and inline skates, have different rules and equipment, and involve different types of skating but share the category and name of roller hockey. Roller hockey (quad) is played using traditional quad roller skates, affording greater maneuverability to the player - this results in games filled with fancy footwork, tight maneuvering, and is more similar to football or basketball. The stick is more or less the same as in bandy and shinty. Roller hockey (inline) bears close resemblance to ice hockey and is played on inline skates, uses an ice hockey stick and includes a lot of fast "racing back and forth" action. Inline hockey goalies use a glove called a catcher to catch shots made on goal, and a flat, usually square, mitt called a blocker which is used to deflect shots on goal. The Quad hockey goalie uses a flat batting glove that provides rebound characteristics when blocking a shot on goal.

=== Inline hockey ===
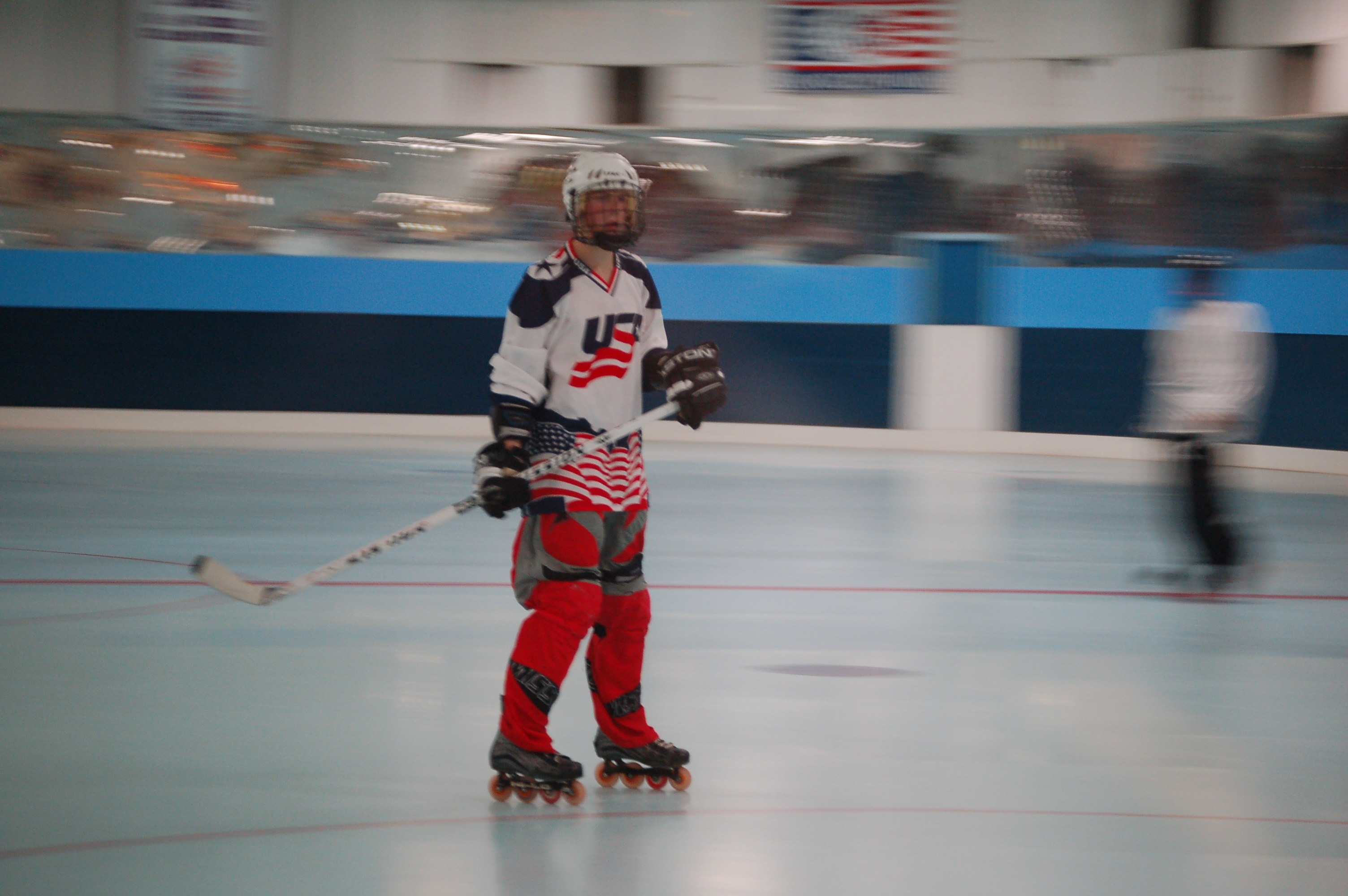
Inline hockey is played on inline skates

Inline hockey is a variation of roller hockey very similar to ice hockey, from which it is derived. It is referred to by many names worldwide, including inline hockey, roller hockey, longstick hockey, deck hockey, road hockey, and street hockey depending on which region of the world in which it is played. It is a World Skate Games discipline.

Like ice hockey, inline hockey is considered a contact sport, however body checking is prohibited. It is similar to ice hockey in that teamwork, skill and aggressiveness are needed. Excepting the use of inline roller skates instead of ice skates, the equipment of inline roller hockey is similar to that of ice hockey.

The game is played by two teams, consisting of four skaters and one goalie, on a dry rink divided into two halves by a center line, with one net at each end of the rink. Regulation games are structured into three 15-minute periods, which extend to 20 minutes at higher competitive levels, separated by intermission breaks. When played more informally, the game often takes place on a smooth, asphalt surface outdoors. When played more informally, the game often takes place on a smooth, asphalt surface outdoors. The game is played in three 15-minute periods or if it is higher standard it's played 20-minutes in each of the three periods, plus 10- to 15-minute intermission breaks. The game rules differ from ice hockey in a few simple ways: there is no icing and it is played in a 4 on 4 player format instead of 5 on 5. The overtime method used here is golden goal (a.k.a. "sudden death") in which whoever scores first is the winner; 5 minutes is the duration per period.

Generally speaking, only competitive-level inline hockey is strictly bound by the governing body's rules. Recreational hockey leagues may make modifications to certain aspects of the rules to suit local requirements (size of rink, length of periods and penalties). Roller hockey is a growing sport with teams cropping up all over the country. The fact that it can be played on any dry surface means that it can be played in almost any leisure center.

=== Rink hockey ===
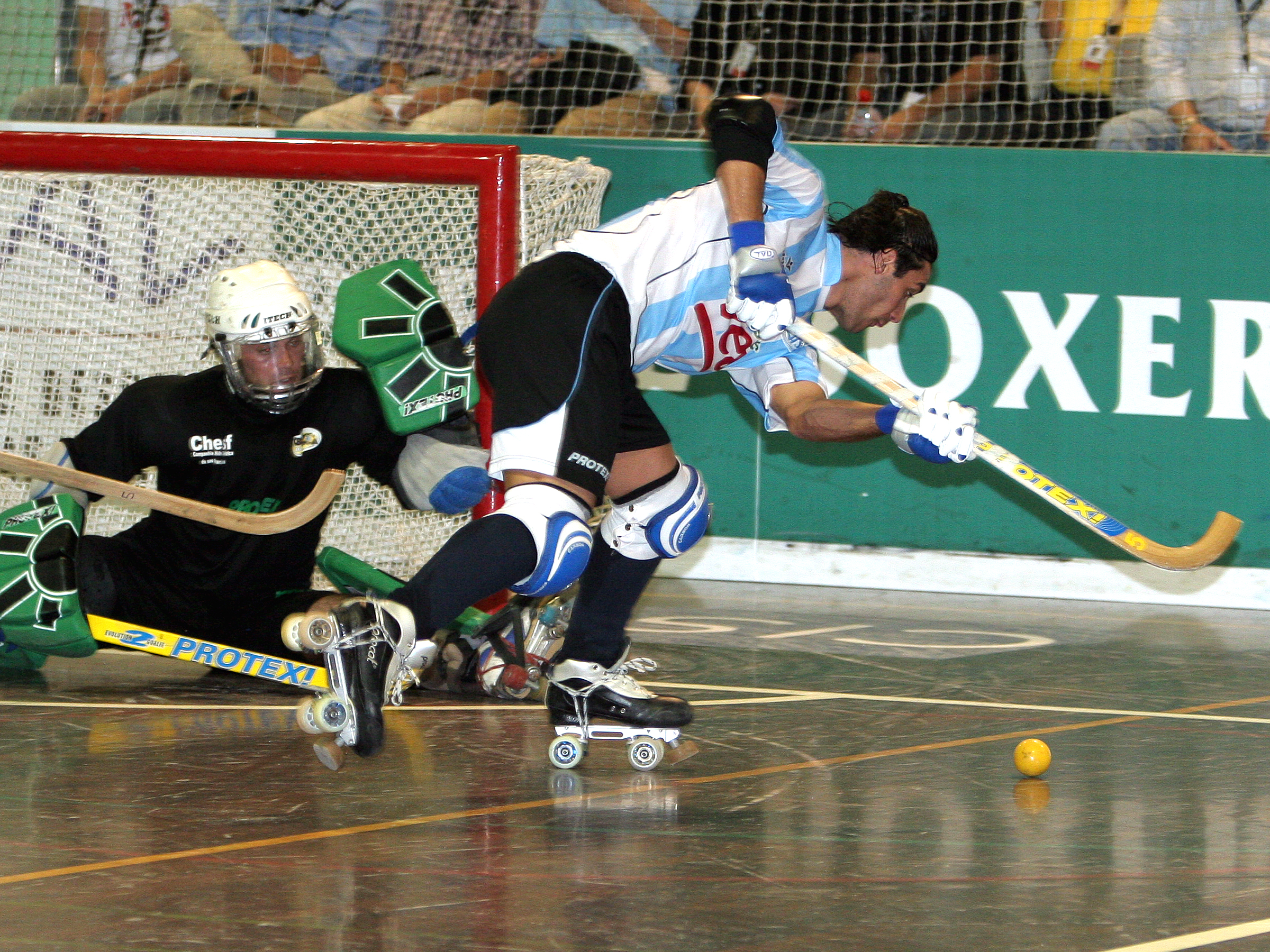
Rink hockey

Rink hockey is a variation of roller hockey. Rink hockey is the overarching name for a rollersport that has existed long before inline skates were "re-invented" in the '70s (They were actually invented before quads, in the 1760s). Rink hockey has been played on quad skates, in sixty countries worldwide and so has many names worldwide. Sometimes the sport is called quad hockey, international style ball hockey, Rink hockey, roller hockey and hardball hockey, depending on which region of the world it is played. Roller hockey was a demonstration rollersport in the 1992 Summer Olympics in Barcelona. Since 2017, the World Championships have been held every two years at the World Skate Games. In England, 9 teams currently play in the Roller Hockey Premier League, which is governed by the NRHA.

== Tournaments ==
Most competitive youth hockey teams play in tournaments. The tournaments vary depending on location, but a typical bracket system is usually used.

World Skate is the international association that organize the biggest roller hockey world championship for rink hockey and inline hockey. The championships are part of the biennial World Skate Games and over twenty national teams participate in these events.

For inline hockey in the U.S., teams travel to different locations around their state, sometimes even going out of state. There are intrastate tournaments and out-of-state tournaments. There are even national tournaments competitive teams compete for. There are other tournaments located in the U.S but played by players all around the world. Narch and Statewars are two Nationwide tournaments of every skill level and age group.

In Europe, rink hockey is governed by World Skate Europe - Rink Hockey (CERH).

== Roller hockey brands ==
Many of the same brands that make ice hockey equipment also make roller hockey skates including Bauer, Easton, Mission, Tron and many more. There are also some brands that specialize in roller hockey like el Leon de Oro (Spain), Tour, Alkali, Revision and Mission (but they make some ice hockey equipment also). Other rink hockey brands include Reno, TVD, Meneghini, Proskate and Azemad.

== See also ==
- Hockey
- Floor hockey
- Floorball
- Inline hockey
- Quad hockey
- World Skate
- Roller hockey at the 1992 Summer Olympics
- Roller Hockey International
- Street Hockey
- USA Roller Sports
