= EVRICup =

The EVRICUP is a European Veteran event of Roller Hockey disputed by club Teams. In each edition there are tournaments: one for players with more than 35 years (since 2003) and one for players with more than 50 years (since 2009). The event is organized by IEC, and is held every all years.

== EVRICup +35 ==
EVRICup
- Founded: 2003
- Region: Europe (CERH)
- Number of teams: 10
- Current champions: Portugal CRPF Lavra (1st title)
- Most successful team(s): Spain Club Tennis Barcino(8 titles)
- Website: http://www.evricup.com/exchangepage.php?pagina=nexttour
- 2018 EVRICup +35

Edition	Year	Host city	(gold) Gold	(silver) Silver	(bronze) Bronze
	2023	Viana do Castelo	CRPF Lavra	OC Barcelos	Voltrega
24	2018	Viana do Castelo	OC Barcelos	GeieG	CD Paço de Arcos
23	2017	Oviedo	Barcino	Parede	GeieG
22	2016	Trieste	Parede	CD Paço de Arcos	GeieG
21	2015	Paço de Arcos	Parede	Barcino	FC Porto
20	2014	Voltrega	Barcino	Valkenswaard	Parede
19	2013	Herne Bay	GDR "Os Lobinhos"	CD Paço de Arcos	Herne Bay United
18	2012	Valkenswaard	CD Paço de Arcos	VRC-Dreamteam	Lobinhos
17	2011	Sintra	Lobinhos	CD Paço de Arcos	Barcino
16	2010	Castiglione	Barcino	Castiglione	Parede
15	2010	Darmstadt	Barcino	Vilafranca	VRC-Dreamteam 16
14	2009	Girona	Vilafranca	Parede	Castiglione
13	Not held				
12	2009	Zaandam	Parede	Voltrega	
11	2008	Cascais	Parede	Barcino	Vilafranca
10	2008	Vilafranca	Parede	Barcino	Vilafranca
9	2007	Leuven	Vilafranca	Barcino	Girona
8	2007	Barcelona	Girona	Vilafranca	Barcino
7	2006	Darmstadt	Barcino	Vilafranca	Darmstadt
6	2006	Castiglione	Barcino	Darmstadt	
5	2005	Wuppertal	Darmstadt	Castiglione	Cronenberg
4	2005	Zaandam	Barcino	Castiglione	Dreamteam 4
3	2004	Girona	Barcino	Southsea	Girona
2	2004	Castiglione	All Star Italia	Castiglione	Barcino
1	2003	Barcelona	Barcino	Castiglione	Girona

=== Number of EVRICUP +35 by Team ===
Team	Championships
Club Tennis Barcino	9
Parede Foot-Ball Clube	5
Club Patí Vilafranca	2
GDR Os Lobinhos	2
C.D. Paço d'Arcos	1
Girona	1
RSC Darmstadt	1
All Star Italy	1
OC Barcelos	1
CRPF Lavra	1
TOTAL	23

=== Number of EVRICUP +35 by Country ===
Team	Championships
Spain	12
Portugal	9
Germany	1
Italy	1

== EVRICup +50 ==
EVRICup
- Founded: 2009
- Region: Europe (CERH)
- Number of teams: 8
- Current champions: Spain CP Voltrega (1st title)
- Most successful team(s): Spain Club Patin Cibeles(4 titles)
- Website: http://www.evricup.com/exchangepage.php?pagina=nexttour
- 2018 Evricup +50

Ed	Year	Host	Winner	Runner-up	3rd Place
12	2018	Viana do Castelo	CP Voltrega	Kurink HC	ASDH Bassano
11	2017	Oviedo	CP Voltrega	CT Barcino	CP Cibeles
12	2016	Trieste	CP Cibeles	CT Barcino	Evergreen Trieste
9	2015	Paço de Arcos	EHRC Marathon	CT Barcino	CP Cibeles
8	2014	Voltrega	CP Cibeles	HC Trieste	CP Voltrega
7	2013	Herne Bay	CT Barcino	CP Cibeles	HC Trieste
6	2012	Valkenswaard	Cibeles	Lobinhos	Trieste
5	2011	Sintra	Cibeles	Castiglione	Lobinhos
4	2010	Castiglione	Tugass	Castiglione	Dream Team 3
3	2010	Darmstadt	Tugass	Dream Team 2	Rolta
2	2009	Girona	Girona	Parede	Dream Team 1
1	2009	Zaandam	Experimental Event		

=== Number of EVRICUP +50 by Team ===
Team	Championships
Club Patin Cibeles	4
Tugass	2
CP Voltrega	2
Club Tennis Barcino	1
Girona	1
EHRC Marathon	1
TOTAL	11

=== Number of EVRICUP +50 by Country ===
Team	Championships
Spain	8
Portugal	2
Netherlands	1
