= Nationalliga B =

Nationalliga B (German), French: Ligue Nationale B, may refer to:

- National League B, second highest ice hockey league in Switzerland
- Swiss Challenge League ?-2003, football league
- Nationalliga B (women's football), second-tier women's football league in Switzerland

== See also ==
- Nationalliga A (disambiguation)
