= Roller Hockey Bundesliga =

Sport championship in Germany

- Current season, competition or edition: 2025–26 Roller Hockey Bundesliga
- Sport: Roller Hockey
- Founded: 1967
- No. of teams: 7
- Country: Germany
- Most recent champion: SK Germania Herringen (9th title)
- Most titles: RESG Walsum (16 titles)
- Website: Deutscher Rollsport

Rollhockey Bundesliga is the biggest Roller Hockey Clubs Championship in Germany.

== List of winners ==
A German championship was organised from 1920 onwards. From 1967 onwards the Roller Hockey Bundesliga was established:

Year	Champion
1920	ERSC Stuttgart
1921	RSC Berlin
1922	SVR Berlin
1923-1928	Not held
1929	ERSC Stuttgart
1930	Not held
1931	ERSC Stuttgart
1932	Not held
1933	ERSC Stuttgart
1934	ERSC Stuttgart
1935	ERSC Stuttgart
1936	ERSC Stuttgart
1937	FC Nurnberg
1938	FC Nurnberg
1939	FC Nurnberg
1941	FC Nurnberg
1941	FC Nurnberg
1942	FC Nurnberg
1943-1946	Not held
1947	SSRC Stuttgart
1948	SSRC Stuttgart
1949	RESG Walsum
1950	Eintracht Dortmund
1951	SpVg Herten
1952	RESG Walsum
1953	RESG Walsum
1954	RESG Walsum
1955	SpVg Herten
1956	SpVg Herten
1957	SpVg Herten
1958	ERC Stuttgart
1959	ERC Stuttgart
1960	TSG Darmstadt

Year	Champion
1961	SpVg Herten
1962	TSG Darmstadt
1963	TSG Darmstadt
1964	SpVg Herten
1965	SpVg Herten
1966	TSG Darmstadt
1967	VfL Huls
1968	IGR Remscheid
1969	IGR Remscheid
1970	SpVg Herten
1971	RESG Walsum
1972	RESG Walsum
1973	RESG Walsum
1974	RESG Walsum
1975	RESG Walsum
1976	ERG Iserlohn
1977	ERG Iserlohn
1978	IGR Remscheid
1979	SpVg Herten
1980	RSC Cronenberg
1981	RESG Walsum
1982	RSC Cronenberg
1983	TGS Ober-Ramstadt
1984	RSC Cronenberg
1985	RESG Walsum
1986	ERG Iserlohn
1987	RESG Walsum
1988	RSC Darmstadt
1989	RESG Walsum
1990	RESG Walsum
1991	RESG Walsum
1991-92	IGR Remscheid
1992-93	RSV Weil

Year	Champion
1993-94	IGR Remscheid
1994-95	RSV Weil
1995-96	RSC Cronenberg
1996-97	TuS Düsseldorf-Nord
1997-98	RSC Cronenberg
1998-99	RESG Walsum
1999-00	RSV Weil
2000-01	RSC Cronenberg
2001-02	RSC Cronenberg
2002-03	RSC Cronenberg
2003-04	RSV Weil
2004-05	RSC Cronenberg
2005-06	ERG Iserlohn
2006-07	RSC Cronenberg
2007-08	ERG Iserlohn
2008-09	ERG Iserlohn
2009-10	RSC Cronenberg
2010-11	RSC Cronenberg
2011-12	RSC Cronenberg
2012-13	SK Germania Herringen
2013-14	SK Germania Herringen
2014-15	ERG Iserlohn
2015-16	ERG Iserlohn
2016-17	ERG Iserlohn
2017-18	SK Germania Herringen
2018-19	SK Germania Herringen
2019-20	SK Germania Herringen
2021-22	SK Germania Herringen
2022-23	SK Germania Herringen
2023-24	SK Germania Herringen
2024-25	SK Germania Herringen

== Number of Championships by team ==
Pos.	Team	State	Titles	Last title	Notes
1	RESG Walsum	Duisburg	16	1998/99
2	RSC Cronenberg	Wuppertal	13	2011/12
3	SpVgg Herten	Herten	9	1978/79	Fusion with DJK SpVgg Herten
	ERG Iserlohn	Iserlohn	9	2016/17
	SK Germania Herringen	Hamm	9	2024/25
5	ERSC Stuttgart	Stuttgart	7	1935/36
6	1. FC Nürnberg	Nürnberg	6	1941/42	now competing as 1. FCN Roll- und Eissport in other sports
7	IGR Remscheid	Remscheid	5	1993/94
8	RSV Weil	Weil am Rhein	4	2003/04	since 2004 competes in Swiss League
	TSG 1846 Darmstadt	Darmstadt	4	1965/66	actually competing in 2. Bundesliga Süd
11	ERC Stuttgart	Stuttgart	2	1958/59	result of fusion with SSRC Stuttgart
	SSRC Stuttgart	Stuttgart	2	1947/48	combined with ERC Stuttgart
13	TuS Düsseldorf-Nord	Düsseldorf	1	1996/97
	RSC Darmstadt	Darmstadt	1	1987/88
	TGS Ober-Ramstadt	Ober-Ramstadt	1	1982/83
	VfL Marl-Hüls	Marl	1	1966/67	actually competing as VfL Hüls in 2. Bundesliga Nord-West
	TuS Eintracht Dortmund	Dortmund	1	1949/50
	SVR Berlin	Berlin	1	1921/22
	RSC Berlin	Berlin	1	1920/21
