= Campeonato San Juanino de hockey sobre patines =

Roller hockey championship in Argentina

- Founded: 1942
- Country: Argentina
- Confederation: Federacion Sanjuanina de Patín
- Number of clubs: 14
- Level on pyramid: 2
- Current champions: Concepción PC
- Most championships: Estudantil; Concepción PC (17)
- Website: www.fspatin.com.ar/fsp/index.php

Campeonato San Juanino de hockey sobre patines (San Juan Roller Hockey Championship) is the state Roller Hockey Clubs Championship in San Juan, Argentina. The best ranked teams in each season qualify to Liga Nacional Argentina A-1. In 2015, 7 of 14 teams in Liga A-1 were from San Juan.

== Records ==
=== List of Winners ===
Year	Champion
2015	Concepción PC
2014	Richet Zapata
2013	SEC
2012	Banco Hispano
2011	Centro Valenciano
2010	Olímpia
2009	Estudantil
2008	Centro Valenciano
2007	Estudantil
2006	Estudantil
2005	Centro Valenciano
2004	Concepción Patín Club
2003	Bancaria
2002	Bancaria
2001	Olímpia
2000	Olímpia
1999	Club Atlético Social
1998	Olímpia
1997	Olímpia
1996	Olímpia
1995	UVT
1994	UVT
1993	UVT
1992	Club Atlético Social
1991	Concepción Patín Club
1990	UVT
1989	UVT
1988	Estudantil
1987	Club Atlético Social
1986	UVT
1985	UVT
1984	UVT
1983	UVT
1982	Concepción Patín Club
1981	Olímpia
1980	Estudantil
1979	Concepción Patín Club
1978	Estudantil
1977	Estudantil
1976	Concepción Patín Club
1975	Concepción Patín Club
1974	Estudantil
1973	Concepción Patín Club
1972	Estudantil
1971	Estudantil
1970	Concepción Patín Club
1969	Club Atlético Social
1968	Estudantil
1967	Club Atlético Social
1966	Estudantil
1965	Estudantil
1964	Club Atlético Social
1963	Club Atlético Social
1962	Olímpia
1961	Estudantil
1960	Estudantil
1959	Estudantil
1958	Olímpia
1957	Club Atlético Social
1956	Club Atlético Social
1955	Estudantil
1954	Concepción Patín Club
1953	Concepción Patín Club
1952	Concepción Patín Club
1951	Concepción Patín Club
1950	Concepción Patín Club
1949	Concepción Patín Club
1948	Concepción Patín Club
1947	Concepción Patín Club
1946	Olímpia
1945	Olímpia
1944	Olímpia
1943	Olímpia
1942	Olímpia

=== Titles by Team ===
Team	Championships
Concepción Patín Club	17
Estudantil	17
Olímpia	14
UVT	9
Club Atlético Social	9
Centro Valenciano	3
Bancaria	2
SEC	1
Richet Zapata	1
Banco Hispano	1
TOTAL	74
