= Pavilhão dos Barreiros =

- Interactive map of Pavilhão dos Barreiros
- Location: Funchal, Madeira, Portugal
- Coordinates: 32.6476565°N 16.9272951°W
- Capacity: 500

Tenants
- C.S. Marítimo and Hoquei Clube da Madeira

The Pavilhão dos Barreiros is an indoor arena located in Funchal, Madeira, Portugal.

The facility is home to the roller hockey teams of C.S. Marítimo and Hoquei Clube da Madeira.
