= Alexandra Palace Roller Skating Club =

Alexandra Palace Roller Skating Club was an English roller sports club comprising roller hockey, speed and artistic sections based at Alexandra Palace, London.

== Early years ==
Skaters Cavalcade recorded the formation of the Alexandra Palace Roller Skating Club in 1905 by Messrs H Holmes, W Kent, Russell Smith, Gibbs, and Micklewood. This is predated by an account in Sporting Life of a game of roller hockey between Alexandra Palace and Thornsett in March 1904 at Crystal Palace. The club established itself as one of England's top roller sports club enjoying success across all disciplines. A number of club members won national championships including speed skating champions Jimmy Reed, Eddie Stumbke and Dan Howard as well as figure skating champion Len Seagrave.

== Post-war ==
Alexandra Palace RHC picked up where they left off following the war with further success in national speed skating championships. However, this success was set against an increasingly hostile relationship with the management of Alexandra Palace who in an attempt to maximise profits favoured prioritising rink time for public sessions.

== Later years ==
The hockey team had its most successful period in the early 1960s winning the NRHA Cup in 1962, but this was followed by a sharp decline soon after. The rink at Alexandra Palace fell into an increasing state of disrepair during the 1970s culminating in sections of the roof collapsing in 1977. A fire during restoration damaged much of the rest of Alexandra Palace and signalled the end of Alexandra Palace RSC. The hockey section was reconstituted, first as Talacre RHC and then as North London RHC. The club disbanded in 1998.
