= Pakistan Roller Hockey National Championship =

Roller hockey championship

- Sport: Roller Hockey
- No. of teams: 4
- Country: Pakistan
- Most recent champion: Punjab Yellow
- Website: Pakistan Roller Hockey

The Pakistan Roller Hockey National Championship is the biggest Roller Hockey Clubs Championship in Pakistan.

== Participating teams in the last season ==
Punjab Blue and Punjab Yellow from Punjab city and CDGK Cheetas and Karachi King from Sindh.

=== List of winners ===
Year	Champion
2011	Punjab Yellow

=== Number of championships by team ===
Team	Championships
Punjab Yellow	1
TOTAL	1
