= Indian Roller Hockey National Championship =

Indian sports competition

- Sport: Roller Hockey
- Founded: 1963
- No. of teams: 12
- Country: India
- Most recent champion: Chandigarh
- Website: Roller Skating Federation of India, RSFI

The Indian Roller Hockey Championship is the biggest Roller Hockey States Championship in India, and is disputed in men and women.

== Teams ==
The list of participating teams are:

- Haryana
- Chandigarh
- Jammu and Kashmir
- Punjab
- Uttar Pradesh
- Delhi
- Andhra Pradesh
- Tamil Nadu
- Maharashtra
- Karnataka
- Rajasthan
- Kerala
- Madhya Pradesh
- Telangana

== Men's competition ==
=== List of winners ===
Year	Champion	2nd place	3rd place
2022	Chandigarh	-	-
2021	Jammu and kashmir	-	-
2020	Haryana	-	-
2019	Haryana	-	-
2018	Chandigarh	Haryana	-
2017	Haryana	Punjab	Jammu and kashmir
2016	Haryana	Chandigarh	Punjab
2015	Haryana		
2014	Chandigarh	Haryana	Jammu and kashmir
2012	Haryana	Chandigarh	Jammu and kashmir
2011	Jammu and Kashmir	Haryana	Chandigarh
2010	Haryana	Chandigarh	Punjab
2009	Chandigarh	Haryana	Punjab
1999	Chandigarh		
1998	Chandigarh		

=== Number of Indian National Championships by team ===
Team	Championships
Chandigarh	4
Jammu and Kashmir	1
Haryana	5
TOTAL	10

== Women's competition ==
=== List of winners ===
Year	Champion	2nd place	3rd place
2014	Haryana	Andhra Pradesh	Chandigarh
2012	Haryana	Jammu and Kashmir	Andhra Pradesh
2011	Haryana	Andhra Pradesh	Jammu and Kashmir
2010	Haryana		
2009	Haryana	Andhra Pradesh	Delhi

=== Number of Indian National Championships by team ===
Team	Championships
Haryana	5
chandigarh	4
Jammu and kashmir	1
TOTAL	10
