= Brazilian Roller Hockey National Championship =

- Sport: Roller Hockey
- Founded: 1972
- No. of teams: 8
- Country: Brazil
- Most recent champion: Sport (2025)
- Most titles: Sertãozinho (22 titles)
- Website: Confederação Brasileira de Hóquei e Patinação

The Brazilian Roller Hockey National Championship is the biggest Roller Hockey Clubs Championship in Brazil.

== Participants ==
The clubs that competed in 2024 were: Clube Internacional de Regatas, Clube Português do Recife, Sport Club do Recife, Sertãozinho Hóquei Clube, Casa de Portugal de Teresópolis, Mogiana Hóquei Clube, Teresópolis Hóquei Clube and Casa de Portugal de Petrópolis.

== List of champions ==
Season	Champions
1972	Regatas Santista (1)
1973	Not held
1974	Regatas Santista (2)
1975-1977	Not held
1978	Palmeiras (1)
1979	Not held
1980	Português (1)
1981	Português (2)
1982	Portuguesa (1)
1983	Internacional (1)
1984	Internacional (2)
1985	Sertãozinho (1)
1986	Sertãozinho (2)
1987	Sertãozinho (3)
1988	Smar (1)
1989	Sertãozinho (4)
1990	Sertãozinho (5)
1991	Sertãozinho (6)
1992	Sertãozinho (7)
1993	Sertãozinho (8)
1994	Palmeiras (2)
1995	Sertãozinho (9)
1996	Sertãozinho (10)
1997	Sport (1)
1998	Português (3)
1999	Sertãozinho (11)
2000	Português (4)
2001	Sertãozinho (12)
2002	Corrêas (1)
2003	Sertãozinho (13)
2004	Sertãozinho (14)
2005	Sertãozinho (15)
2006	Sertãozinho (16)
2007	Sertãozinho (17)
2008	Sertãozinho (18)
2009	Sertãozinho (19)
2010	Sport (2)
2011	Corrêas (2)
2012	Sertãozinho (20)
2013	Sport (3)
2014	Sport (4)
2015	Mogiana (1)
2016	Mogiana (2)
2017	Portuguesa (2)
2018	Sport (5)
2019	Sport (6)
2020	Not held
2021	Sertãozinho (21)
2022	Internacional (3)
2023	Sertãozinho (22)
2024	Internacional (4)
2025	Sport (7)

=== Titles by team ===
Rank	Club	Winners	Winning years
1	Sertãozinho	22	1985, 1986, 1987, 1989, 1990, 1991, 1992, 1995, 1996, 1999, 2001, 2003, 2004, 2005, 2006, 2007, 2008, 2009, 2012, 2019, 2021, 2023
2	Sport	7	1993, 1997, 2010, 2013, 2014, 2018, 2025
3	Português	4	1980, 1981, 1998, 2000
3	Internacional	4	1983, 1984, 2022, 2024
5	Palmeiras	2	1978, 1994
5	Regatas Santista	2	1972, 1974
5	Corrêas	2	2002, 2011
5	Mogiana	2	2015, 2016
5	Portuguesa	2	1982, 2017
10	Smar	1	1988
