= South African Roller Hockey Championship =

Roller hockey competition

- Sport: Roller Hockey
- No. of teams: 4
- Country: (South Africa)
- Website: Nationals Championship

The South African Roller Hockey Championship is the biggest Roller Hockey Regions Championship in South Africa.

== Regions to compete in the last Season ==
The regions that competed in the season of 2011 were Northerns, Central, Vaal and Easterns.

=== List of Winners ===
Year	Host city	Men's	Women's	Juniors	Juveniles	Infants
2012	Pretoria	Northerns	Central	Central	Central	Vaal
2011	Vanderbijlpark	Northerns	Vaal	Central	Easterns	Vaal
2010	Pretoria	Northerns	Central	Easterns	Easterns	Vaal

=== Number of Men's Senior Championships by Region ===
Team	Championships
Northern	3
