= Japanese Roller Hockey National Championship =

Annual roller hockey competition

- Sport: Roller Hockey
- Founded: 1960
- No. of teams: 14
- Country: Japan
- Most recent champion: GF Club
- Website: Japan Roller Skating Federation

The Japanese Roller Hockey National Championship is the biggest Roller Hockey Clubs Championship in Japan.

== Participated teams in the last season ==
=== List of winners ===
Year	Champion
1960	Ranger Club
1961	Ranger Club
1962	Tokyo Club
1963	Seibu Club
1964	Ranger Club
1965	Seibu Club
1966	Seibu Club
1967	Seibu Club
1968	Seibu Club
1969	Hakusan Club
1970	Korakuen Club
1971	Dax Club
1972	Dax Club
1973	Korakuen Club
1974	Hakusan Club
1975	Yomiuri Land
1976	Hakusan Club
1977	Hakusan Club
1978	Korakuen Club
1979	Korakuen Club
1980	Korakuen Club
1981	Korakuen Club
1982	Hakusan Club
1983	Hakusan Club
1984	Hakusan Club
1985	Hakusan Club
1986	Hakusan Club
1987	Hakusan Club
1988	Korakuen Club
1989	GF Club
1990	Hakusan Club
1991	Tokyo Dome Club
1992	Tokyo Dome Club
1993	Tokyo Dome Club
1994	GF Club
1995	GF Club
1996	MJ Club
1997	GF Club
1998	MJ Club
1999	GF Club
2000	MJ Club
2001	Triple X
2002	GF Club
2003	MJ Club
2004	MJ Club
2005	MJ Club
2006	Triple X
2007	MJ Club
2008	MJ Club
2009	GF Club
2010	MJ Club
2011	DK Nerima
2012	MJ Club
2013	Oriental Classic
2014	DK Nerina
2015	GF Club
2016	MJ Club
2017	MJ Club
2018	Infinity
2019	GF Club
2020	GF Club
2021	GF Club
2022	GF Club
2023	GF Club
2024	Infinity
2025	GF Club

=== Number of Championships by team ===
Team	Championships
GF Club	14
MJ Club	12
Hakusan Club	11
Korakuen Club	7
Seibu Club	5
Tokyo Dome Club	3
Ranger Club	3
Triple X	2
Dax Club	2
DK Nerima	2
Infinity	2
Tokyo Club	1
Yomiuri Land	1
Oriental Classic	1
TOTAL	66
