= Colombian Roller Hockey National Championship =

Roller hockey championship

- Sport: Roller Hockey
- Founded: 1996
- No. of teams: 18
- Country: Colombia
- Most recent champion: Corazonistas
- Website: Roller Hockey Colombian Federation

The Colombian Roller Hockey Championship is the biggest Roller Hockey Clubs Championship in Colombia. The most recent winner is M.H.C, team from Manizales.

== Participated Teams in the last Season ==
1. SUPER PATÍN
2. MIMBRE
3. MANIZALES H.C.
4. INTERNACIONAL
5. F.C.M. ROLLING
6. CORAZONISTA A
7. BUFALOS
8. HALCONES
9. SIETE RIOS
10. CORAZONISTA B
11. R.M.C.
12. REAL
13. MANIZALES B
14. HUNTER´S
15. HURACANES

=== List of Winners ===
Year	Champion
2024	Súper
2023	Huracanes
2022	Real
2021	Real
2018	Corazonistas
2017	Corazonistas
2016	Manizales
2015	Manizales
2014	Manizales
2013	Manizales
2012	Patin Sport
2011	Corazonistas
2010	Mimbre
2009	Corazonistas
2008	Patin Sport
2007	D' Rapeg
2006	D' Rapeg
2005	Corazonistas
2004	Patin Sport
2003	D' Rapeg
2002	Vilachi
2001	Centauros
2000	Valle HC
1999	
1998	Vilachi
1997	Centauros
1996	D' Rapeg
