= Nationalliga A =

Nationalliga A may refer to:

- National League (ice hockey), the top ice hockey league in Switzerland
- Swiss LNA, the top roller hockey league in Switzerland
- Swiss Super League, formerly the Nationalliga A, the top football league in Switzerland
- Nationalliga A (women's football), the top football women's league in Switzerland
- Nationalliga A (American football), the top American football league in Switzerland
