= Mexican Roller Hockey National League =

National sports league

- Sport: Roller Hockey
- No. of teams: 6
- Country: Mexico
- Most recent champion: Jaguares
- Website: Mexican Federation

The Mexican Roller Hockey Championship is the biggest Roller Hockey Clubs Championship in Mexico.

== Participated teams in the last season ==
1. Jaguares
2. All Blacks, Aztecas
3. Gallos Negros Querétaro
4. Lobos BUAP
5. Patin San Luis

=== List of winners ===
Year	Champion
2011	Jaguares

=== Number of championships by team ===
Team	Championships
Jaguares	1
TOTAL	1
