= Liga Nacional Argentina A-1 =

- Founded: 1994; 31 years ago
- Country: Argentina
- Confederation: CPRS
- Number of clubs: 14
- Level on pyramid: 1
- Relegation to: Liga A-2
- International cup: Rink Hockey South American Club Championship
- Current champions: Centro Valenciano (2010-11)
- Most championships: Olímpia (6)
- Website: Official website
- Current: 2011 Liga Nacional Argentina A-1

Liga Nacional Argentina A-1 is the biggest Roller Hockey Clubs Championship in Argentina, and in the Americas.

== Current teams (2010–11 season) ==
=== Zona A ===
| Club | City | Province |
|---|---|---|
| Club Atlético Estudiantil Porteño | Buenos Aires | (autonomous city) |
| UVT | Trinidad-San Juan | San Juan |
| Olímpia | Trinidad-San Juan | San Juan |
| Estudantil | San Juan | San Juan |
| Leonardo Murialdo | Mendoza, Argentina | Mendonza |
| Banco Mendonza | Mendoza, Argentina | Mendonza |
| Casa de Italia | Mendoza, Argentina | Mendonza |

=== Zona B ===
| Club | City | Province |
|---|---|---|
| Club Atlético Huracán | Buenos Aires | (autonomous city) |
| Club Ciudad de Buenos Aires | Buenos Aires | (autonomous city) |
| SEC | San Juan | San Juan |
| Concepción Patín Club | Concepción, San Juan | San Juan |
| Centro Valenciano | Rawson, San Juan | San Juan |
| Andes Talleres | Mendoza, Argentina | Mendonza |
| Palmira | Mendoza, Argentina | Mendonza |

== List of Winners ==
=== League Champions ===
| Year | Champion | Runner-up |
|---|---|---|
| 2017 | U.V.T. | Murialdo |
| 2016 | Concepción P.C. | Banco Hispano |
| 2015 | Richet-Zapata | SEC |
| 2014 | Richet-Zapata | Banco Mendoza |
| 2013 | Petroleros-YPF | SEC |
| 2012 | Andes Talleres | Estudiantil |
| 2011 | Centro Valenciano | Estudiantil |
| 2010 | U.V.T. | Rivadavia |
| 2009 | U.V.T. | Olímpia |
| 2008 | Unión S.J. | Estudiantil |
| 2007 | Concepción P.C. | Andes Talleres |
| 2006 | Estudiantil | Olímpia |
| 2005 | Olímpia | Concepción P.C. |
| 2004 | Olímpia | U.V.T. |
| 2003 | U.V.T. | Centro Valenciano |
| 2002 | U.V.T. | Olímpia |
| 2001 | Olímpia | U.D. Bancaria |
| 2000 | Olímpia | Concepción P.C. |
| 1999 | U.D. Bancaria | Social |
| 1998 | Concepción P.C. | Olímpia |
| 1997 | Olímpia | Palmira |
| 1996 | Olímpia | Social |
| 1995 | U.V.T. | Estudiantil |
| 1994 | Concepción P.C. | U.V.T. |

=== Titles by Team ===
| Team | Championships |
|---|---|
| Olímpia | 6 |
| UVT | 6 |
| Concepción Patín Club | 4 |
| Richet-Zapata | 2 |
| Centro Valenciano | 1 |
| Estudantil | 1 |
| Unión | 1 |
| Bancaria | 1 |
| Andes Talleres | 1 |
| Petroleros-YPF | 1 |
| TOTAL | 24 |

=== Titles by State ===
| State | Championships |
|---|---|
| San Juan | 22 |
| Mendoza | 2 |
