= Belgium Roller Hockey League =

National sports league

- Sport: Roller Hockey
- No. of teams: 4
- Country: Belgium

The Belgium Roller Hockey League was the biggest Roller Hockey Championship in Belgium. The last edition took place in 1999. The Belgium clubs have taking part in the Dutch NRBB (Dutch Roller Hockey League).

== List of Winners ==
Year	Champion
1999	Modern
1952	RH Knokke
1948	RHC Klopstokia
1946	RHC Klopstokia
1945	RHC Klopstokia
1944	
1943	RHC Klopstokia
1942	RHC Klopstokia
1941	RHC Klopstokia

== Number of Men's Senior Championships by Region ==
Team	Championships
RHC Klopstokia	6
Modern	1
RH Knokke	1
TOTAL	8
