= Ohio Speedskating Tour =

The Ohio Speedskating Tour was the oldest continually running roller-skating racing state league in the United States. It is also known as the Ohio Buckeye Speed League. It is sanctioned by USA Roller Sports.
