= New Zealand Roller Hockey National Championship =

Sporting competition

- Sport: Roller Hockey
- Founded: 1995
- No. of teams: 25
- Country: New Zealand
- Website: http://inlinehockeynz.org.nz/

The New Zealand Inline Hockey National Championships is the biggest Inline Hockey Club Championship in New Zealand.

== Teams ==
- Auckland Orcas
- Capital Penguins
- Christchurch Snipers
- Glenfield Blackhawks
- Hamilton Devils
- Kapiti Coast Rangers
- Levin Thunder
- Manawatu Dragons
- Manukau Storm
- Massey Titans
- Morrinsville Piako Pirates
- Mt. Mustangs
- Mt. Wellington Panthers
- Napier Sharks
- Nelson Whalers
- New Plymouth Ravens
- Northland Stingrays
- Rimutaka Renegades
- Auckland Sabres
- Tauranga Mighty Ducks
- Tawa Typhoons
- Vipers Inline Hockey
- Waihi Miners
- Wanganui Lightning United
