= Liga Nacional de Hockey Chilena =

Chilean association of Roller Hockey Clubs

- Sport: Roller Hockey
- Founded: 2001
- No. of teams: ?
- Country: Chile
- Most recent champion: Liceo San Agustín
- Website: Liga Nacional de Hockey Chilena

The Liga Nacional de Hockey Chilena is one association of Roller Hockey Clubs in Chile. The Liga Nacional de Hockey Chilena is divided in three tournaments:

- Torneo Apertura (Open Tournament)
- Torneo Clausura (Close Tournament)
- Liga de Honor Apertura (Open Honor League)
- Liga de Honor Clausura (Close Honor League)

== Participated Teams in the last Season ==
=== List of Winners ===
Year	Torneo Apertura	Torneo Clausura	Liga de Honor Apertura	Liga de Honor Clausura
2011			Miguel Leon Prado	
2010	Universidad Catolica	Universidad Catolica	Universidad Catolica	Liceo San Agustín
2009	Universidad Catolica	Liceo San Agustín	Liceo San Agustín	Universidad de Chile
2008	Liceo San Agustín	Universidad de Chile	Saint Mary Joseph	Universidad de Chile
2007	C.D. Thomas Bata	Miguel Leon Prado B	started in 2008	started in 2008
2006	Universidad Catolica	C.D. Thomas Bata	started in 2008	started in 2008

=== Number of Championships by team ===
Team	Torneo Apertura	Torneo Clausura	Liga de Honor Apertura	Liga de Honor Clausura	TOTAL
Universidad Catolica	3	1	1	0	5
Liceo San Agustín	1	1	1	1	4
Universidad de Chile	0	1	0	2	3
C.D. Thomas Bata	1	1	0	0	2
Miguel Leon Prado	0	1	1	0	2
Saint Mary Joseph	0	0	1	0	1
TOTAL	5	5	4	3	17
