= Uruguayan National Roller Hockey League =

National roller hockey league

- Sport: Roller Hockey
- Founded: 2008
- No. of teams: 6
- Country: Uruguay
- Most recent champion: Pinamar
- Website: Liga Uruguaya de Hockey Patines

The Uruguayan Roller Hockey Championship is the biggest Roller Hockey Clubs Championship in Uruguay.

== Participating teams in the last season ==
1. Platense
2. Pinamar
3. Golden Wings de Maldonado
4. CE.SO.PE (Centro Social Peñarol)
5. Pioneros de Flores and Albatros de Montevideo

=== List of winners ===
Year	Champion
2010	Pinamar
2009	
2008	Platense

=== Number of championships by team ===
Team	Championships
Pinamar	1
Platense	1
TOTAL	2
