= USA Rink Hockey National Championship =

- Founded: 1961
- Country: United States
- Confederation: CPRS
- Number of clubs: 10
- Level on pyramid: 1
- Current champions: Olympia Warriors (2025)
- Most championships: Olympia Warriors (14)
- Website: http://usarinkhockey.com

The USA Rink Hockey National Championship is the biggest Roller Hockey Clubs Championship in United States. In the U.S., the sport is largely owned by roller rink operators. The sport suffers stateside since players are mostly made up of operator's family members and a gaggle of childhood friends. Since the sport transitioned to the United States in the 1960s, teams and players competing in the United States have waned as roller rinks continue to close nationwide. Teams are often completed by tapping skaters from ice or inline hockey who are willing to give it a go and round out teams at U.S. nationals; many playing on inline skates. The sport is struggling in the U.S. due to the lack of public access to the sport found in other countries where the sport continues to grow. In contrast to other countries, the U.S. players and teams are managed and vetted by roller rink operators and their families. This practice explains the recurring players, teams, and regions who compete each year, and the loss of total number of teams since the 1960s and 1970s.

== USA National Championship ==
=== Participated Teams in the last Season ===
The clubs that competed in the season of 2025 were:

- Lubbock Phoenix
- Olympia Warriors
- Bedford Bandits
- Cumberland Raiders
- Ocala Cannons
- Salt Lake City Snipers
- Colorado Panthers
- Littleton Flames
- Colorado Springs Lightning
- Aurora Cougars

=== List of Winners ===
Year	Team
2025	Olympia Warriors
2024	Washington Crusaders
2023	Boyertown Phantoms
2022	Lubbock Phoenix
2021	Washington Crusaders
2019	Bremerton Hurricanes
2018	Bedford Bandits
2017	Boyertown Phantoms
2016	Olympia Warriors
2015	Burlington Spartans
2014	Olympia Warriors
2013	Burlington Spartans
2012	Olympia Warriors
2011	Olympia Warriors
2010	Olympia Warriors
2009	Olympia Warriors
2008	Olympia Warriors
2007	Merced Knights
2006	Cumberland
2005	Cumberland
2004	Olympia Warriors
2003	Boyertown Ph.
2002	Olympia Warriors
2001	Olympia Warriors
2000	Olympia Warriors
1999	Olympia Warriors
1998	Olympia Warriors
1997	Cumberland
1996	Bremerton Hurricanes
1995	Bremerton Hurricanes
1994	Boyertown Ph.
1993	Port Neches
1992	Port Neches
1991	Port Neches
1990	Port Neches
1989	Port Neches
1988	Glendora Hustlers
1987	Port Neches
1986	Glendora Hustlers
1985	Sacramento
1984	Cumberland
1983	Cumberland
1982	Cumberland
1981	Lubbock Ghosts
1980	Cumberland
1979	Lubbock Ghosts
1978	Boyertown Ph.
1977	Lubbock Ghosts
1976	Lubbock Ghosts
1975	Cumberland
1974	Glendora Hustlers
1973	Cumberland
1972	Lubbock Ghosts
1971	Lubbock Ghosts
1970	Lubbock Ghosts
1969	Knight Hawks of Port Neches
1968	Knight Hawks of Port Neches
1967	Knight Hawks of Port Neches
1966	Knight Hawks of Port Neches
1965	Angels
1964	Lubbock Ghosts
1963	Lubbock Ghosts
1962	Lubbock Ghosts
1961	Lubbock Ghosts

=== Number of Championships by team ===
Team	Number of Champions
Olympia Warriors	14
Lubbock Ghosts	11
Port Neches	10
Cumberland Raiders	9
Boyertown Phantoms	5
Bremerton Hurricanes	3
Glendora Hustlers	3
Washington Crusaders	2
Burlington Spartans	2
Merced Screaming eagles	1
Sacramento	1
Angels	1
Bedford Bandits	1
Lubbock Phoenix	1
TOTAL	64

== See also ==
- News about 2010 US National Roller Hockey in Bremerton
