= Herne Bay United =

English roller hockey club

- Full name: Herne Bay United Roller Hockey Sport Club
- League: NRHA Premier League
- Founded: 9 October 1924; 101 years ago
- Home ground: The Bay Arena, Herne Bay, England

Herne Bay United, also known as HBU, is a roller hockey club based in Herne Bay, England. The club was founded on 9 October 1924.

Since 1993 HBU have won 16 of the 20 English NRHA Premier League championships (more than any other club), winning their last one in the 2009-10 Season. The Club have also won 12 National Cup titles - the only teams winning more being Herne Bay RHC and Southsea RHC.

== History ==
Herne Bay United Roller Hockey Club was formed on 9 October 1924 with hockey, dance and speed sections. It expanded rapidly and swiftly became the most popular and best supported of all clubs. Today it still flourishes as the country's premier club with numbers and trophies won increasing constantly.

The club came about mainly because the existing Herne Bay Club had become too large and the ‘Second’ team wished to play in more prestigious competitions. The breakaway players soon established the Pier Pavilion as a home base and even requested one stand to be their own so that their supporters would not have to sit with the Herne Bay followers.

Over the next few years United quickly became a major force competing in, and winning, tournaments throughout England and continental Europe with regular trips to Belgium and France along with the occasional longer train trip to Montreux, Switzerland.

Although the war resulted in a number of lost years United continued to flourish with a peak membership of 468 in May 1948. On the rink the team continued to win tournaments but much to the chagrin of players and supporters alike Herne Bay seemed to have the edge in the regular ‘Derby’ matches. It has not been all plain sailing for United as the Pier Pavilion burning down nearly caused the club to fold. However, a few hardy individuals persevered to begin to mould the club into the success it is today.

Currently the club has teams at every level from under 9's through to a Senior team competing in the National Premier League. This is far and away the most successful period in the club's illustrious history with the 1st team having won the league 16 times in the last 20 years. Couple this with the highly successful youth section and hopefully the club can make it to its centenary at the top of English roller hockey.

== Titles ==
- 16 NRHA Premier League: 1993, 1994, 1995, 1996, 1997, 1998, 2000, 2001, 2002, 2003, 2004, 2006, 2007, 2008, 2009 and 2010
- 11 National Cup: 1935, 1937, 2000, 2001, 2002, 2003, 2004, 2006, 2007, 2008, 2009 and 2019

== 2012-2013 Squad ==
- Dave Garlick (Goalkeeper)
- Eddie Mount (Goalkeeper)
- Garret Priestley (Goalkeeper)
- Jay Williamson (Goalkeeper)
- Neil Austin
- Myles Barker
- Ashley Barton
- Daniel Butcher
- Rodrigo De Carvalho
- George Holmes
- Simon Hosking (Captain)
- Joe Singleton
- Karl Smith
- David Todd
- Fabio Vicente
- Tom White

Coach: (England) Phil McVey
