= Middlesbrough RHC =

Middlesbrough RHC
Club Name	Middlesbrough Roller Club
Image
Foundation	1947
Arena	Middlesbrough Sports Village; England
President	(England) Tony Czifra
Secretary	(England) Andrew Lee Simpson
League	Premier League
Position 2012 - 13	1st
Website	https://www.mrhc.co.uk

The Middlesbrough RHC (Middlesbrough Roller Hockey Club) is a Roller Hockey team from Middlesbrough, England. It was founded in 1947. In 2011, it won the 1st English title and its second in 2012 - 13, when the club won 11 consecutive matches after Christmas, scoring the winning goal in the last match of the season with 10 seconds left of the match. this was the only time in the season that the club had been top of the league.

The club trains Wednesdays (6-10pm) and Fridays (7-10pm) at the Middlesbrough Sports Village in Middlesbrough.

== Trophies ==
1st - English premier league 2010-12 & 2012-13 1st - national cup winners 2012, 2010, 2009 2013 NCRHA Elite Cup Winners 2013 NCRHA U18s League Winners 2013 NCRHA U16s Cup Winners 2013 NCRHA U16s League
