= Rink Hockey French Championship =

Hockey championship

- Sport: Roller Hockey
- Founded: 1911
- No. of teams: 12
- Country: France
- Most recent champion: SCRA Saint Omer (11th title)
- Most titles: Coutras (16 titles)
- Website: Fédération française de roller et skateboard

The main French Clubs Competition is called by Française Rink Hockey Nationale 1. It nowadays is disputed by 12 teams. The Champion in the last edition of Nationale 1 was SCRA Saint Omer.

== History ==
=== History after 1990 ===
Year	(gold) Gold	(silver) Silver	(bronze) Bronze
1989–1990	RSGM	La Vendéenne	SA Gazinet Cestas
1990–1991	SCRA Saint Omer	La Vendéenne	RSGM
1991–1992	SCRA Saint Omer	SA Gazinet Cestas	Nantes ARH
1992–1993	SCRA Saint Omer	Nantes ARH	RSGM
1993–1994	SCRA Saint Omer	La Vendéenne	Nantes ARH
1994–1995	Nantes ARH	SCRA Saint Omer	La Vendéenne
1995–1996	La Vendéenne	HC Dinan Quévert	SCRA Saint Omer
1996–1997	HC Dinan Quévert	ROC Vaulx en Velin	La Vendéenne
1997–1998	HC Dinan Quévert	SA Mérignac	La Vendéenne
1998–1999	HC Dinan Quévert	SCRA Saint Omer	SA Mérignac
1999–2000	HC Dinan Quévert	ROC Vaulx en Velin	SCRA Saint Omer
2000–2001	SCRA Saint Omer	HC Dinan Quévert	La Vendéenne
2001–2002	HC Dinan Quévert	SCRA Saint Omer	Nantes ARH
2002–2003	La Vendéenne	SCRA Saint Omer	SA Mérignac
2003–2004	La Vendéenne	HC Dinan Quévert	SCRA Saint Omer
2004–2005	La Vendéenne	SA Mérignac	HC Dinan Quévert
2005–2006	SCRA Saint Omer	La Vendéenne	US Coutras
2006–2007	La Vendéenne	SPRS	SCRA Saint Omer
2007–2008	HC Dinan Quévert	SCRA Saint Omer	SA Mérignac
2008–2009	SCRA Saint Omer	HC Dinan Quévert	US Coutras
2009–2010	US Coutras	HC Dinan Quévert	SCRA Saint Omer
2010–2011	US Coutras	SCRA Saint Omer	HC Dinan Quévert
2011–2012	HC Dinan Quévert	SCRA Saint Omer	US Coutras
2012–2013	SCRA Saint Omer	HC Dinan Quévert	RAC Saint Brieuc
2013–2014	HC Dinan Quévert	La Vendéenne	SCRA Saint Omer
2014–2015	HC Dinan Quévert	SA Mérignac	La Vendéenne
2015–2016	La Vendéenne	SA Mérignac	HC Dinan Quévert
2016–2017	La Vendéenne	HC Dinan Quévert	SCRA Saint Omer
2017–2018	HC Dinan Quévert	SCRA Saint Omer	SA Mérignac
2018–2019	HC Dinan Quévert	SCRA Saint Omer	La Vendéenne
2019–2020	SCRA Saint Omer	La Vendéenne	HC Dinan Quévert
2020–2021	No competition		
2021–2022	SCRA Saint Omer	HC Dinan Quévert	La Vendéenne
2022–2023	SCRA Saint Omer	HC Dinan Quévert	US Coutras
2023–2024	SCRA Saint Omer	La Vendéenne	HC Dinan Quévert
2024–2025	SCRA Saint Omer	HC Dinan Quévert	US Coutras

=== History between 1911 and 1989 ===
Season	Winner
1911	HC Orléans
1912	HCF Tourcoing
1913	HCF Tourcoing
1914	Paric HC
1915	Non joué
1916	Non joué
1917	Non joué
1918	Non joué
1919	Paris HC
1920	Paris HC
1921	Paris HC
1922	HCF Tourcoing
1923	HCF Tourcoing
1924	Rink Burdigalien
1925	Stade Bordeaux UC
1926	Non joué
1927	Stade Bordeaux UC
1928	HCF Tourcoing
1929	Stade Bordeaux UC
1930	Stade Bordeaux UC
1931	Satde Bordeaux UC
1932	Stade Bordeaux UC
1933	Stade Bordeaux UC
1934	Stade Bordeaux UC
1935	Wattrelos HC
1936	SA Gazinet
1937	Stade Bordeaux UC

Season	Winner
1938	FC Lyon
1939	FC Lyon
1940	Non joué
1941	Non joué
1942	Biarritz OL + FC Lyon
1943	Stade Bordeaux UC
1944	Girondins ASP Bordeaux
1945	Biarritz OL
1946	Biarritz OL
1947	SA Gazinet
1948	ASPTT Bordeaux
1949	ASPTT Bordeaux
1950	ASPTT Bordeaux
1951	ASPTT Bordeaux
1952	HCF Tourcoing ou Burdigala HC
1953	HCF Tourcoing ou SA Gazinet
1954	ACBL Nantes ou Burdigala HC
1955	ACBL Nantes ou RAC des Bretons de la Loire
1956	ASPTT Bordeaux
1957	
1958	Biarritz OL
1959	Biarritz OL
1960	Metallo Sport Nantes
1961	Metallo Sport Nantes
1962	Burdigala Bordeaux
1963	Metallo Sport Nantes
1964	US Coutras

Season	Winner
1965	RSGM
1966	US Coutras
1967	RSGM
1968	US Coutras
1969	RSGM
1970	US Coutras
1971	US Coutras
1972	US Coutras
1973	RSGM
1974	US Coutras
1975	US Coutras
1976	La Vendéenne
1977	US Coutras
1978	La Vendéenne
1979	La Vendéenne
1980	US Coutras
1981	RSGM
1982	La Vendéenne
1983	US Coutras
1984	US Coutras
1985	US Coutras
1986	US Coutras
1987	La Vendéenne
1988	RSGM
1989	La Vendéenne

== Titles by club ==
Nb	Club	Nb
1	US Coutras	16
2	La Vendéenne	13
3	SCRA Saint Omer	13
4	HC Dinan Quévert	11
5	Stade Bordelais UC	10
6	Roller Skating de Gujan-Mestras	7
7	Nantes Atlantique Rink Hockey	6
8	Tourcoing	5
9	ASPTT Bordeaux	5
10	Paris	4
11	Biarritz Olympique	4
12	Lyon	2
13	SAG Cestas	2
14	Orléans	1
15	Rink Burdigalien Bordeaux	1
16	Wattrelos	1
17	Bordeaux	1
18	Burdigala Bordeaux	1
