= Austrian Roller Hockey League =

National sports league

- Sport: Roller Hockey
- Founded: 1992
- No. of teams: 4
- Country: Austria
- Most recent champion: RHC Wolfurtn

The Austrian Roller Hockey National Championship is the biggest Roller Hockey Clubs Championship in Austria.

== Participated Teams in the last Season ==
RHC Villach, RHC Wolfurt, RHC Dornbirn and RHC Dornbirn B.

=== List of Winners ===
Year	Champion
2023	RHC Wolfurt
2022	RHC Dornbirn
2021	RHC Wolfurt
2019	RHC Wolfurt
2018	RHC Dornbirn
2017	RHC Dornbirn
2016	RHC Dornbirn
2015	RHC Wolfurt
2014	RHC Villach
2013	RHC Dornbirn
2012	RHC Dornbirn
2011	RHC Dornbirn
2010	RHC Dornbirn
2009	RHC Dornbirn
2008	RHC Dornbirn
2007	RHC Wolfurt
2006	RHC Dornbirn
2005	RHC Dornbirn
2004	RHC Dornbirn
2003	RHC Dornbirn
2002	RHC Dornbirn
2001	RHC Wolfurt
2000	RHC Dornbirn
1999	RHC Villach
1998	RHC Villach
1997	RHC Villach
1996	RHC Wolfurt
1995	RHC Wolfurt
1994	RHC Villach
1993	RHC Villach
1992	RHC Villach

=== Number of Championships by team ===
Team	Championships
RHC Dornbirn	16
RHC Wolfurt	8
RHC Villach	7
TOTAL	31
