= Israel Roller Hockey League =

Athletic event

- Sport: Roller Hockey
- Founded: 1957
- No. of teams: 7
- Country: Israel
- Most recent champion: Maalot
- Website: Roller Hockey in Israel

The Israel Roller Hockey League is the biggest Roller Hockey Clubs Championship in Israel.

== History and Information About the Israel Association ==
The Roller Hockey sport was brought to Israel in 1957 by "a handful of fanatics" led by Mr. Aaron Jordan. The founders of the league were Jordan Aaron, Aba Beker, Abraham Moses, Mordechai Sas, Sorkin Arthur (deceased), Phillip Abud, Ramon Irit, Tzvi Shot and Zora Auliven. Honorary Members are Yoav Kadosh, Judit Schumacher, Isaac Ashkenazi, Galiichagoets Sima, Holtzberg Ida (z), Wexler Janna, Efraim Levin, Eliezer Elkin, Luptin Ethel, Flatzor Ester (deceased), Pulber Rivi, Shemko Nathan and Sar Haya.

The association was founded in 1973 by organized skaters, who later grew and developed under the name Association of skates in Israel. Today, the association contains more than 800 members from 30 registered clubs. It also provides guidance and support to union workers, and contributes to the development of skating sports such as figure skating, Rink Hockey, inline skating and roller speed skating. All registered clubs are subject to local management committees consisting of corporate professionals. Each year the organization produces and distributes guidelines to suggest courses of action according to the needs of the area and the international guidelines for the organization. As a full-fledged member of the International Roller Sports Federation and the European Confederation of Roller Skating, the Israeli union is recognized by the International Olympic Committee and maintains a full professional cooperation with the Wingate Institute as well as the Ministry of Science Council of the gambling culture and sports.

== Goals ==
The primary goals of the league include:

- Managing and supervising the organization of national, international, league, and cup competitions
- Encouraging a professional representation for the skating arena throughout the world
- Creating, developing, and nurturing professional relationships with international associations and skating organizations
- Establishing regulations, instructions, and procedures for the registered clubs within its jurisdiction
- Obtaining and negotiating the necessary budget measures for union purposes
- Publishing a variety of professional movies, journal articles, and other content related to rink hockey, figure skating, inline skating, and roller speed skating
- Organizing mutual funds to provide income for development goals and the union as a whole
- Promoting trainers, judges, administrators, instructional courses, and clubs in Israel and abroad
- Amplifying and nurturing culture in the public consciousness regarding the roller skating industry
- Any other action authorized by the General Assembly in relation to management of the union or promotion of the industry

== Staff Training and Judging ==
A total of six training courses have been conducted for artistic skating instructors and coaches during summer projects at the Wingate Institute. Between 1997 and 1999, the first accredited training course of its kind for judges and coaches was held at the institute, in cooperation with the International Roller Sports Federation (FIRS). In the hockey sector, only two instructor courses have been held to date, resulting in a growing demand for additional training programs and educational manuals.

== Juniors league ==
In Israel, the Juniors league divided to 2. north and south. The south league administered by Radan Reis and Lior Uliel. There are a few teams, as Tzur Hadasa, Bee'r Tuvia, Nataf, etc.'. The north league administered by Alon Vizman. There are a few teams, some of them are competitiveness and some are there not. example for some competitiveness teams : Kiryat Bialik, Ramat Yishai, Nofit, The Academia for Galgiliot, Hayogev, Maalot, Bet Lehem. The junior league is divided to age strata: U16 (15–16), U14 (13–14), U12 (11–12), and U10 (9–10). Some of the junior U16 league play with their senior clubs.

== Israel League ==
Some of clubs that competed in the season of 2010 were: Kiryat Bialik, Ramat Yishai, Nofit, The Academia for Galgiliot, Hayogev, Maalot, Bet Lehem.

=== List of Winners ===
Year	Senior Champion	U19 Champion	U17 Champion	U15 Champion	U13 Champion	U11 Champion
2013–14	Kiryat Bialik					
2012–13	Ramat Yishai	Nofit				
2011–12	Nofit			Alona - Biniamina		
2010–11	Maalot		Nofit	Nofit	Alona - Biniamina	
2009–10	Ramat Yishai		Kiryat Bialik	Nofit	Nofit	Alona - Biniamina
2008–09	Ramat Yishai				Alona - Biniamina	

=== Number of Israeli National Seniors Championships by team ===
Team	Championships
Ramat Yishai	3
Maalot	1
Nofit	1
Kiryat Bialik	1
TOTAL	6

== Israel Cup ==
Israel Cup is the second main competition of Roller Hockey in Israel, and is disputed by all the Roller Hockey clubs in Israel.

=== Winners ===
Year	Senior Cup	U19 Cup	U16 Cup	U14 Cup	U12 Cup	U10 Cup
2013	Ramat Yishai	Nofit				
2012	Nofit			Alona - Biniamina		
2011	Academia Galgiliot		Nofit	Alona - Biniamina	Alona - Biniamina	
2010	Ramat Yishai		Nofit	Beit Lehem	Nofit	Beit Lehem
2009	Academia Galgiliot		Cancelled	Beit Lehem	Beit Lehem	Alona - Biniamina

=== Number of Israel Cups by Senior team ===
Team	Cups
Ramat Yishai	2
Academia Galgiliot	2
Nofit	1
TOTAL	5
