= Parede =

Civil parish in Cascais, Portugal

- Civil parish
- Location in Portugal
- Coordinates: 38°41′36″N 9°21′25″W
- Country: Portugal
- Region: Lisbon
- Metropolitan area: Lisbon
- District: Lisbon
- Municipality: Cascais
- Established: Civil parish: 14 May 1953
- Disbanded: 2013

Area
  - Total: 3.60 km^{2} (1.39 sq mi)
- Elevation: 49 m (161 ft)

Population (2001)
  - Total: 17,830
  - Density: 4,950/km^{2} (12,800/sq mi)
- Time zone: UTC+00:00 (WET)
  - Summer (DST): UTC+01:00 (WEST)
- Postal code: 2775-222
- Area code: (+351) 214 XX XX XX
- Patron: Nossa Senhora da Assunção
- Website: www.jf-parede.pt

Parede (Portuguese pronunciation: [ˈvilɐ ðɐ pɐˈɾeðɨ]) is a former civil parish in the municipality of Cascais, Portugal. In 2013, the parish merged into the new parish Carcavelos e Parede. In 2001 its resident population was approximately 17,830 inhabitants, covering an area of 3.6 km^{2}, west of Lisbon on the coast near the mouth of the Tagus estuary. Parede is a community between the larger towns of Oeiras and Cascais, in the district of Lisbon, along the Linha do Estoril railway line that follows the coast from Lisbon to Estoril and Cascais.

== History ==
The place's name is generally associated with the abundant rocks/boulders within the region, or the walled parcels, common until the growth of the urban settlement. Professor Diogo Correia, in his book Toponímia do Concelho de Cascais, refers to the topology in these terms: "In the opinion of authoritative specialists, the walls that gave the name to the homonymic settlements, were from ruined castles, dismantled redoubts, and many times, hilltop rocks. It was probably from one of these old constructions, not likely castros that fostered the name Parede, in the municipality of Cascais". Branca Colaço and Maria Archer, later confirm these ideas in their explanation for the locality: "...Parede...its old name, of three or four centuries...topology that many suggest from the many walls of loose rock, that were used to circle their properties...which even today are maintained, and that others attribute to the local terrain's structure, rich limestone in quarries, which, for centuries, were used in the construction of the walls of Lisbon".

The occupation of Parede extends over four thousand years, although only documented references exist from the late 19th century. Although evidence of a Roman presence within the municipality exists (particularly in the civil parish of Alcabideche, Cascais, Estoril, and São Domingos de Rana), there are no similar signs of their presence in Parede. Although not explicit, there is an assumption that Roman forces used the extracted stone from the region, in many of their artefacts or buildings. Vidal de Caldas Nogueira, in articles composed in 1957, suggest that: "The Romans would collect the rock for their constructions, monuments and many of the inscriptions in Olissipo (Lisbon) from the quarries in Lisbon and Sintra, is not difficult to believe that this antique burgh was today exists Parede, they became active in this inscription industry from marble and granite."

Until 1953, the parish was part of the neighbouring civil parish of São Domingos de Rana. At that time, it received administrative autonomy, bringing with it the places of Buzano, Junqueiro, Madorna, Murtal, Penedo and Rebelva. Its limits were established under Decree 39208, 14 May 1953.

== Geography ==
Parede is part of the municipality of Cascais, in the district of Lisbon in the historical province of Estremadura, pertaining to the old comarca of Cascais, and the Diocese of Lisbon. It is one of six civil parishes that comprise the municipality of Cascais, bordered on the south by the Atlantic Ocean, east by Carcavelos, north by São Domingos de Rana and in the west by Estoril. Apart from the road network, it is connected with other civil parishes by the Linha do Estoril railline which connects Cascais to Lisbon.

Open and green spaces include public parks and their beachfront coastal spaces, with rocky beaches and strong biodiversity, supporting a Blue flag designation.

The region is supported by many standard municipal services, including a police station, a fire department, a healthcare center, schools, a market, some banks, a supermarket, a small shopping center and many minor shops. Although two centres exist for specialized healthcare treatment, the Hospital de Santa Ana and the Hospital/Sanitario Dr. José d'Almeida (for endocrinology and ortopedy, respectively), its population has no general hospital.

== Architecture ==
=== Archaeological ===
- Inscription on the façade of the Municipal building (Portuguese: Lápide na parede fronteira à Casa da Câmara)
- Millennium Marker, Chapel of São Bartolomeu (Portuguese: Marco Miliário ainda não inventariado, embutido na parede do alpendre da capela de São Bartolomeu)

=== Civic ===
- Chalet Maria Amélia (Portuguese: Internato Infantil da Parede/Centro de Dia de Nossa Senhora da Visitação)
- Building of Correios, Telégrafos e Telefones (CTT) da Parede
- Primary School of Parede (Portuguese: Escola Primária da Parede)

=== Religious ===
- Chapel of Quinta da Parede Nova (Portuguese: Capela de Quinta da Parede Nova)
