= Roller Hockey Premier League =

English hockey league

ERH Premier League
- Sport: Roller Hockey
- Founded: 1930
- No. of teams: 10
- Country: England
- Most recent champion: King's Lynn
- Website: England Roller Hockey

The Premier League is the main competition in England Roller Hockey. It has a long history, and it has existed since 1930. It has some of the most historic European teams like Herne Bay and Herne Bay United. The top teams usually compete in European Club Competitions like European League or Cers Cup now organised by World Skate Europe - Rink Hockey.

== Participating teams: 2026–2027 season ==
The clubs that are competing in the 2025 - 2026 Season are: Ely and Chesterton United, Farnham, Herne Bay, Herne Bay United, Invicta, King's Lynn, Letchworth, Manchester, Middlesbrough, and Soham. The top tier of English rink hockey is the Premier League consisting of 10 teams playing single match home/away format hockey.

== History of the Premier League ==
Edition	Champion
1973–1974	Wolverhampton
1974–1975	Wolverhampton
1975–1976	Folkestone
1976–1977	Not disputed
1977–1978	Wolverhampton
1978–1979	Middlesbrough RHC
1979–1980	Middlesbrough RHC
1980–1981	Southsea
1981–1982	Southsea
1982–1983	Southsea
1983–1984	Southsea
1984–1985	Southsea
1985–1986	Southsea
1986–1987	Southsea
1987–1988	Southsea

Edition	Champion
1988–1989	Southsea
1989–1990	Southsea
1990–1991	Southsea
1991–1992	Southsea
1992–1993	Herne Bay United
1993–1994	Herne Bay United
1994–1995	Herne Bay United
1995–1996	Herne Bay United
1996–1997	Herne Bay United
1997–1998	Herne Bay United
1998–1999	Letchworth
1999–2000	Herne Bay United
2000–2001	Herne Bay United
2001–2002	Herne Bay United
2002–2003	Herne Bay United

Edition	Champion
2003–2004	Herne Bay United
2004–2005	Bury
2005–2006	Herne Bay United
2006–2007	Herne Bay United
2007–2008	Herne Bay United
2008–2009	Herne Bay United
2009–2010	Herne Bay United
2010–2011	Middlesbrough RHC
2011–2012	Grimsby
2012–2013	Middlesbrough RHC
2013–2014	Grimsby
2014–2015	Middlesbrough RHC
2015–2016	King's Lynn
2016–2017	King's Lynn
2017–2018	King's Lynn

Edition	Champion
2018 -2019	King's Lynn
2019 - 2020	King's Lynn
2020 - 2021	King’s Lynn
2021 - 2022	King’s Lynn
2022 - 2023	King’s Lynn
2023 - 2024	King’s Lynn
2024 - 2025	King’s Lynn
2025-2026	King's Lynn

=== Number of Championships by Team ===
Team	Championships
Herne Bay United	16
Southsea	12
King’s Lynn	11
Middlesbrough	5
Wolverhampton	3
Grimsby	2
Bury St Edmunds	1
Folkestone	1
Letchworth	1
TOTAL	52

== National Cup ==
The National Cup is the second main competition of Roller Hockey in England and is played by all the English clubs.

Year	Winners
1930	Herne Bay
1931	Herne Bay
1932	Herne Bay
1933	Herne Bay
1934	Herne Bay
1935	Herne Bay United
1936	Herne Bay
1937	Herne Bay United
1938	Herne Bay
1939	Herne Bay
1940	Herne Bay
1941	Herne Bay
1942	Herne Bay
1943	Herne Bay
1944	Herne Bay
1945	Herne Bay
1946	Herne Bay
1947	Herne Bay
1948	Herne Bay
1949	Herne Bay
1950	Herne Bay
1951	Herne Bay
1952	Herne Bay
1953	Herne Bay
1954	Great Harwood
1955	Herne Bay
1956	Herne Bay
1957	Great Harwood
1958	Herne Bay
1959	Rochester
1960	Rochester
1961	Birchpark
1962	Alexandra Palace
1963	Herne Bay

Year	Winners
1964	Wolverhampton
1965	Wolverhampton
1966	Folkestone
1967	Folkestone
1968	Folkestone
1969	Bury St. Edmunds
1970	Wolverhampton
1971	Wolverhampton
1972	Wolverhampton
1973	Southsea
1974	Herne Bay United
1975	Folkestone
1976	Southsea
1977	Southsea
1978	Herne Bay
1979	Herne Bay
1980	Southsea
1981	Southsea
1982	Southsea
1983	Southsea
1984	Herne Bay
1985	Southsea
1986	Southsea
1987	Southsea
1988	Southsea
1989	Southsea
1990	Maidstone
1991	Southsea
1992	Herne Bay
1993	Herne Bay
1994	Herne Bay
1995	Middlesbrough RHC
1996	Herne Bay United
1997	Maidstone

Year	Winners
1998	Letchworth
1999	Maidstone
2000	Herne Bay United
2001	Herne Bay United
2002	Herne Bay United
2003	Herne Bay United
2004	Herne Bay United
2005	Bury St. Edmunds
2006	Herne Bay United
2007	Herne Bay United
2008	Herne Bay United
2009	Herne Bay United
2010	Middlesbrough RHC
2011	Herne Bay United
2012	Middlesbrough RHC
2013	Grimsby
2014	Grimsby
2015	Middlesbrough RHC
2016	Middlesbrough RHC
2017	Middlesbrough RHC
2018	Soham
2019	King's Lynn

=== Number of English Cups by Team ===
Team	Cups
Herne Bay	32
Herne Bay United	14
Southsea	13
Wolverhampton	5
Middlesbrough RHC	5
Folkestone	4
Maidstone	3
Bury St Edmunds	2
Rochester	2
Great Harwood	2
Grimsby	2
Letchworth	1
Alexandra Palace	1
Birchpark	1
King's Lynn	4
Soham	1
TOTAL	89

== National Division 1 ==
The second tier of English rink hockey is National Division 1. It was played on a tournament basis where teams play twice a tournament, with a total of 10 games in the season. In 2018-19 ECU won the right to move up to the National Premier League, with Herne Bay also making the move up. The clubs that are competing in the National Division 1 2019 - 2020 Season were: Cambridge and Cottenham RHC, Ely & Chesterton United RHC, Farnham RHC, Letchworth RHC, RHC Invicta and Spen Valley Flyers RHC.

== The Regions ==
The next tier of the England Roller Hockey league is split into divisions based in each of the 3 regions. Teams in these divisions play tournaments with points going to their league position.

=== Northern Counties ===
==== List of clubs ====
Grimsby RHC, Manchester RSC, Middlesbrough, Plymouth RHC, RHC Sheffield, and Sheffield Wildcats RHC.

=== Eastern Counties ===
==== List of clubs ====
Cambridge and Cottenham RHC, Colchester RHC, Ely and Chesterton United RHC, King's Lynn RHC, Letchworth RHC, Norwich City RHC, Peterborough RHC, Skaters RHC, Soham.

=== South Eastern Counties ===
==== List of clubs ====
Farnham RHC, Herne Bay RHC, Herne Bay United RH&SC, London RHC, Maidstone RHC, RHC Invicta.
