= Dutch NRBB =

Roller Hockey championship

- Sport: Roller Hockey
- Founded: 1946
- No. of teams: 5
- Country: Netherlands
- Most recent champion: Valkenswaardse RC
- Website: Nederlands Rolhockey

NRBB is the biggest Roller Hockey Clubs Championship in Benelux. In 2015 is disputed by teams from EHRC Marathon, RV Brunssum/ZRC, RC de Lichtstad and Valkenswaardse RC from Netherlands, and Kon Modern RCW from Belgium.

== List of Winners ==
Year	Champion
1947	EHRC Marathon
1948	Residentie
1949	Residentie
1950	Residentie
1951	EHRC Marathon
1952	Residentie
1953	Residentie
1954	Residentie
1955	Not held
1956	EHRC Marathon
1957	Hollandia
1958	Hollandia
1959	Residentie
1960	Hollandia
1961	Hollandia
1962	Internos
1963	Internos
1964	EHRC Marathon
1965	Residentie
1966	Residentie
1967	Residentie
1968	Residentie
1969	Residentie
1970	RC de Lichtstad
1971	Dordt
1972	Dordt
1973	Hollandia
1974	RC de Lichtstad
1975	RC de Lichtstad
1976	Residentie
1977	RC de Lichtstad
1978	RC de Lichtstad
1979	RC de Lichtstad
1980	Dennenberg
1981	RC de Lichtstad
1982	Dennenberg
1983	RC de Lichtstad
1984	RC de Lichtstad
1985	Residentie
1986	Dennenberg
1987	Dennenberg
1988	Dennenberg
1989	Dennenberg
1990	Dennenberg
1991	Dennenberg
1992	RC de Lichtstad
1993	RC de Lichtstad
1994	Not held
1995	AGOR
1996	AGOR
1997	AGOR
1998	Valkenswaardse RC
1999	AGOR
2000	RC de Lichtstad
2001	RC de Lichtstad
2002	EHRC Marathon
2003	EHRC Marathon
2004	Valkenswaardse RC
2005	Valkenswaardse RC
2006	Valkenswaardse RC
2007	Valkenswaardse RC
2008	Valkenswaardse RC
2009	Valkenswaardse RC
2010	Valkenswaardse RC
2011	Valkenswaardse RC
2012	RC de Lichtstad
2013	RC de Lichtstad
2014	RC de Lichtstad
2015	EHRC Marathon
2016	Valkenswaardse RC
2017	Not held
2018	Valkenswaardse RC
2019	RC de Lichtstad
2023	Zaanse RC
2024	NL 2000
2025	Valkenswaardse RC

== Number of Championships by team ==
Team	Championships
RC de Lichtstad	17
Residentie	14
Valkenswaardse RC	12
Dennenberg	8
EHRC Marathon	7
Hollandia	5
AGOR	4
Internos	2
Dordt	2
Zaanse RC	1
NL 2000	1
TOTAL	73
