= Swiss LNA =

Roller hockey league in Switzerland

- Sport: Roller Hockey
- No. of teams: 9
- Country: Switzerland
- Most recent champion: RHC Diessbach NLA (5th title)
- Most titles: Montreux HC (50 titles)
- Website: rollhockey.ch

Swiss LNA is the biggest Roller Hockey Clubs Championship in Switzerland.

== List of Winners ==
Season	Winner
1924-25	Montreux
1925-26	Montreux
1926-27	Montreux
1927-28	Montreux
1928-29	Montreux
1929-30	Montreux
1930-31	Montreux
1931-32	Montreux
1932-33	Montreux
1933-34	Montreux
1934-35	Montreux
1935-36	Montreux
1936-37	Montreux
1937-38	Montreux
1938-39	Montreux
1939-40	Montreux
1940-41	Montreux
1941-42	Zürcher RSC
1942-43	Montreux
1943-44	Montreux
1944-45	Montreux
1945-46	Montreux
1946-47	Montreux
1947-48	Montreux
1948-49	Montreux

Season	Winner
1949-50	Montreux
1950-51	Montreux
1951-52	Montreux
1952-53	Montreux
1953-54	Montreux
1954-55	Montreux
1955-56	Montreux
1956-57	Montreux
1957-58	Montreux
1958-59	Montreux
1959-60	Montreux
1960-61	Montreux
1961-62	Genève
1962-63	Montreux
1963-64	Montreux
1964-65	Montreux
1965-66	Montreux
1966-67	RS Zürich
1967-68	RS Zürich
1968-69	Montreux
1969-70	RS Zürich
1970-71	RS Zürich
1971-72	RS Zürich
1972-73	RS Zürich
1973-74	RS Zürich

Season	Winner
1974-75	Montreux
1975-76	Montreux
1976-77	RS Zürich
1977-78	RS Zürich
1978-79	RC Zürich
1979-80	Thunerstern
1980-81	Vevey
1981-82	Montreux
1982-83	Montreux
1983-84	Montreux
1984-85	Basel
1985-86	Montreux
1986-87	Montreux
1987-88	Thunerstern
1988-89	Thunerstern
1989-90	Thunerstern
1990-91	Thunerstern
1991-92	Genève
1992-93	Genève
1993-94	Thunerstern
1994-95	Genève
1995-96	Genève
1996-97	Genève
1997-98	Genève
1998-99	Uttigen

Season	Winner
1999-00	Uttigen
2000-01	Thunerstern
2001-02	Uttigen
2002-03	Uttigen
2003-04	Uttigen
2004-05	Thunerstern
2005-06	Genève
2006-07	Wimmis
2007-08	Genève
2008-09	(Germany) Weil
2009-10	Genève
2010-11	Genève
2011-12	(Germany) Friedlingen
2012-13	Diessbach
2013-14	Genève
2014-15	Basel
2015-16	Diessbach
2016-17	Montreux
2017-18	Montreux
2018-19	Biasca
2019-20	
2020-21	
2021-22	Genève
2022-23	Diessbach
2023-24	Diessbach
2024-25	Diessbach

== Number of Swiss National Championships by team ==
Titles	Team	Seasons
50	Montreux	1924-25, 1925-26, 1926-27, 1927-28, 1928-29, 1929-30, 1930-31, 1931-32, 1932-33, 1933-34; 1934-35, 1935-36, 1936-37, 1937-38, 1938-39, 1939-40, 1940-41, 1942-43, 1943-44, 1944-45; 1945-46, 1946-47, 1947-48, 1948-49, 1949-50, 1950-51, 1951-52, 1952-53, 1953-54, 1954-55; 1955-56, 1956-57, 1957-58, 1958-59, 1959-60, 1960-61, 1962-63, 1963-64, 1964-65, 1965-66; 1968-69, 1974-75, 1975-76, 1981-82, 1982-83, 1983-84, 1985-86, 1986-87, 2016–17, 2017–18
13	Genève	1961-62, 1991-92, 1992-93, 1994-95, 1995-96, 1996-97, 1997-98, 2005-06, 2007-08, 2009-10; 2010-11, 2013-14, 2021-22
9	RS Zürich	1966-67, 1967-68, 1969-70, 1970-71, 1971-72, 1972-73, 1973-74, 1976-77, 1977-78
8	Thunerstern	1979-80, 1987-88, 1988-89, 1989-90, 1990-91, 1993-94, 2000-01, 2004-05
5	Uttigen	1998-99, 1999-00, 2001-02, 2002-03, 2003-04
5	Diessbach	2012-13, 2015-16, 2022-23, 2023-24, 2024-25
2	Basel	1984-85, 2014-15
1	Friedlingen	2011-12
1	Weil	2008-09
1	Wimmis	2006-07
1	Vevey	1980-81
1	RC Zürich	1978-79
1	Zürcher RSC	1941-42
1	Biasca	2018-19
