= Roller hockey (quad) =

Variation of hockey

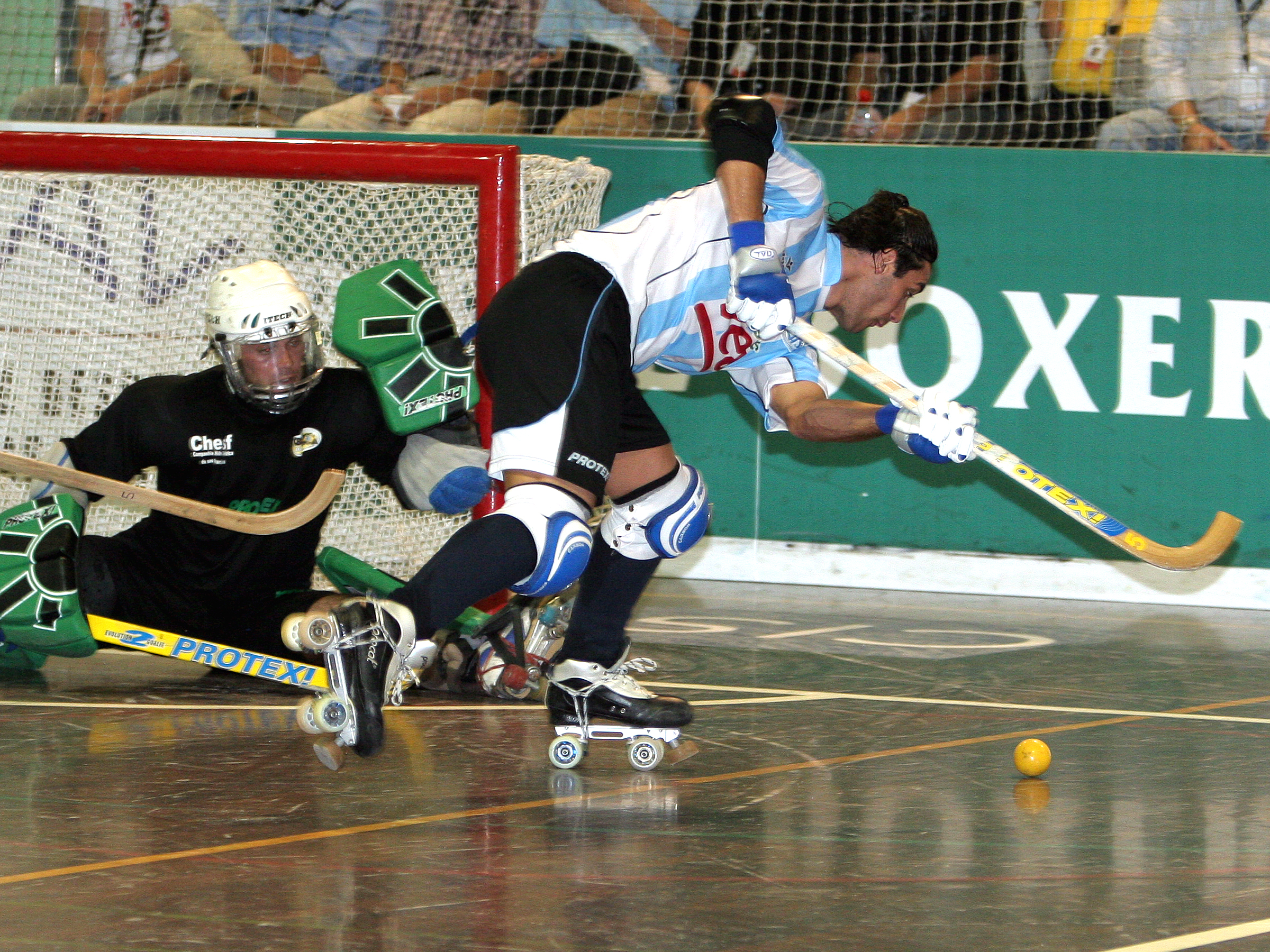
- Argentine player during the 2007 Rink Hockey World Championship.
- Highest governing body: World Skate
- Nicknames: Roller hockey rink hockey hardball hockey quad hockey
- First played: Late 19th century Great Britain

Characteristics
- Contact: Limited
- Team members: 5 per side, a goal-keeper and four floor players
- Mixed-sex: Yes, separate competitions
- Type: Team sport ball sport

Presence
- Olympic: Demonstration sport at 1992 Summer Olympics.
- World Games: 1981 – 1993, 2001

Roller hockey (in British English), rink hockey (in American English), quad hockey or ball roller hockey is a team sport played on roller skates. It is a quad-skate team sport where two teams face-off against one another, trying to drive a hard ball with their sticks into the opposing teams' goalnet. Each team has five players on the rink at a time, four of whom are skaters and one who is the goalkeeper. The game has two 25-minute halves, with 15-minute halftime intermission, plus up to two 5-minute golden goal (a.k.a. "sudden death") periods to settle ties with the clock stopping when the ball becomes dead. If the tie persists, a penalty shootout will determine the winner. Players – including the goalie – use quad skates, whereas inline skates are used in inline hockey. The sticks are similar to those in bandy and shinty. Excessive contact between players is forbidden in rink hockey, unlike inline hockey.

Since 2017, the World Championships for the sport have been part of the World Skate Games organised by World Skate.

Roller hockey was a demonstration rollersport in the 1992 Summer Olympics in Barcelona. There have been 44 editions of the Roller Hockey World Cup. Countries with the most world titles since the 1940s are: Spain (18 World titles), Portugal (16 World titles), Argentina (6 World titles) and Italy (4 World titles). Other countries, such as France, Brazil, Germany, Switzerland, Andorra and England are regular international competitors, but rarely overcome the traditional powers.

Roller hockey is a very fast sport, which may create a problem for TV transmissions, and new rinks are built using blue or white pavement to make the ball more visible on TV.

== History ==
The first recorded hardball roller hockey game was played in 1878 at the Denmark Rink in London, England. It was first known as "roller polo" due to the introduction of polo in 1876, skaters took polo to the rinks. The sport was introduced into the United States in 1882 with the formation of the National Roller Polo League in Dayton, Ohio, with teams in seven cities. In 1884, the Massachusetts Roller Polo league was operating with 14 teams. Organized roller skating sports developed as the popularity of roller skates increased in the late 19th and early 20th centuries. Roller hockey teams were playing throughout Europe as early as 1901. Roller Hockey was played by the famous silent film stars, Stan Laurel and Charlie Chaplin, in the early 1900s. The first World Championships in roller hockey were held in 1936 in Stuttgart, Germany.

During its existence, British Pathé produced a handful of film reels showing roller hockey outdoors as a part of life in different areas of the world. A number of reels were shot between 1940 and the end of the 1950s, mostly in London, UK. One reel shows British children on a street in London having a match. The contest was between the Vincent Harriers and Page Street Monarchs. Another reel taken in the UK shows men competing in an outdoor enclosure and titled, "Roller Hockey at Victoria Park, London (Wasps v Wanderers)". Another is simply titled, "Roller Hockey (1950-1959)".

One reel was shot in Europe in 1940 with young male players, specifically in "Holland, Netherlands", however the players use sticks with blades resembling ice hockey sticks rather than bandy sticks or curved sticks styled in the manner seen today. This particular reel is titled, "Pathetone Lightens The "Blackout" With - ROLLER HOCKEY!". The film was shot at a seaside town in southern Holland at a popular resort called Scheveningen while crowd of people watched, "from the sea front promenade".

Rink hockey was not organized by the Roller Skating Rink Operators Association (RSROA) in the United States until 1959. The sport debuted at the US National Championships in 1961. The Pan American Games introduced roller skating as a sport in 1979 and debuted roller hockey the same year. It was one of the Pan American Games sports in 1979, 1987, 1991 and 1995. It has since been discontinued. Roller hockey was present as an exhibition sport at the 1992 Summer Olympics in Barcelona, Spain. The sport was a regular part of The World Games program in 1981, 1985, 1989, 1993, and 2001.

Due to the 2022 Russian invasion of Ukraine, World Skate banned Russian and Belarusian athletes and officials from its competitions, and will not stage any events in Russia or Belarus in 2022.

== Name ==
Roller hockey was referred to as hardball hockey in the United States until November 2008 when the USOC adopted the sport's more common name, rink hockey. Other names for the sport include hardball roller hockey, ball roller hockey, international style ball hockey, international hockey, quad hockey, hockey, English roller hockey, hockey skids, traditional roller hockey, cane hockey, rollhockey, and rolhockey. In other languages, it is known as hockey sobre patines, hockey pista, hóquei em patins, hokej na koturaljkama, rulleskøjtehockey, rullskridskohockey and rulluisuhoki

== Rink ==
A quad hockey rink

The rink has usually a polished wooden surface, but any flat, non-abrasive and non-slippery material such as treated cement is acceptable. Likewise, it is allowed for rink owners to put advertisements in the playing area, as long as they don't interfere with ball or skate motion, which includes both physically (must be at exactly the same level as the remaining area) and visually (dark colours or any other pattern which can mask the ball).

There are three standard rink sizes: 34×17 meters (minimum), 40×20 meters (handball/futsal field), and 44×22 meters (maximum). Rinks can also be any size between the minimum and maximum values that has a 2:1 size ratio with a 10% margin of error.

The rink has rounded corners (1 m radius) and is surrounded by a 1 m wall. The wall also has a wooden base 2 cm wide and at least 20 cm high. Behind the goals there is a 4 m high net, even if there are no stands (to avoid the ball bouncing back from a wall and hitting a player). If the ball hits the net, it's considered to be out of bounds.

The markings are simple. The halfway line divides the rink into halves, and 22 m from the end wall an "anti-play" line is painted. The area is a 9×5.4 meters rectangle, placed from 2.7 to 3.3 m ahead of the end table. It has a protection area for goalkeepers, a half-circle with 1.5 m radius. All markings are 8 cm in width. The goal (painted in fluorescent orange) is 105 cm high by 170 cm wide. Inside the goal there is a thick net and a bar close to ground to trap the ball inside (before, two extra referees stayed behind the goal to judge goal decisions), and 92 cm deep. While not attached to the ground, it is extremely heavy to prevent movement.

== Equipment ==
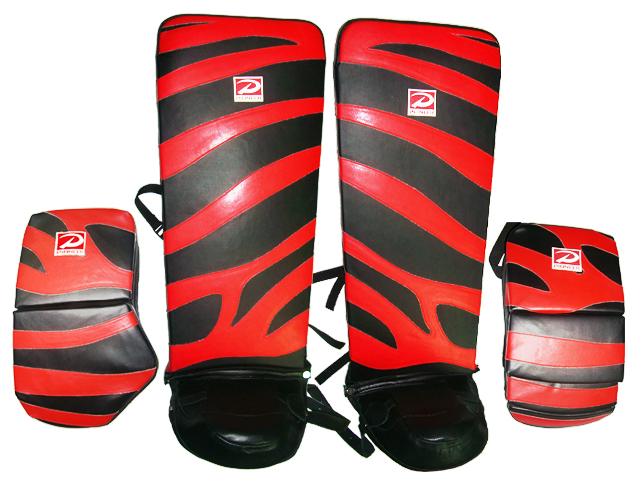
Goalkeeper gloves and leg pads

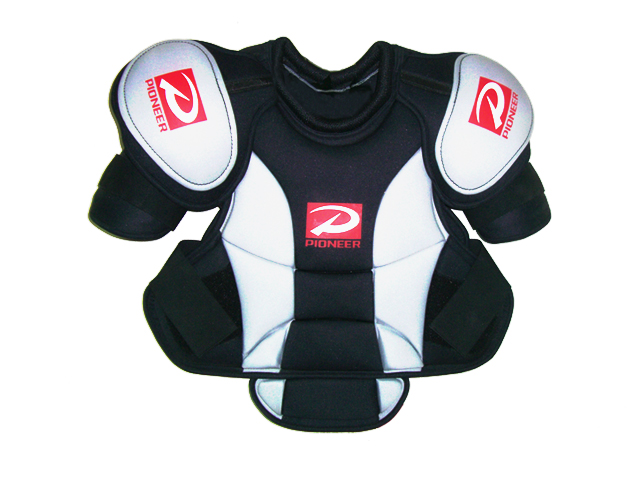
Goalkeeper chest pads

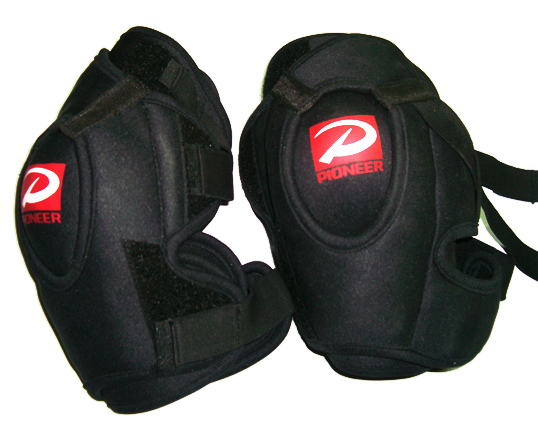
Goalkeeper elbow pads

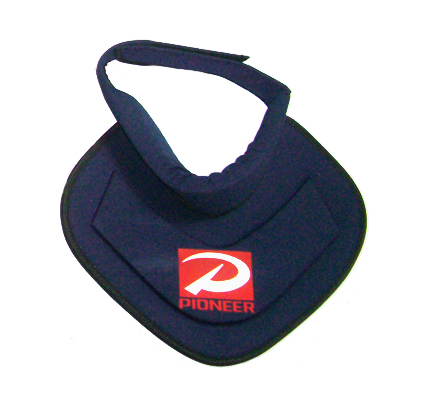
Goalkeeper neck protector

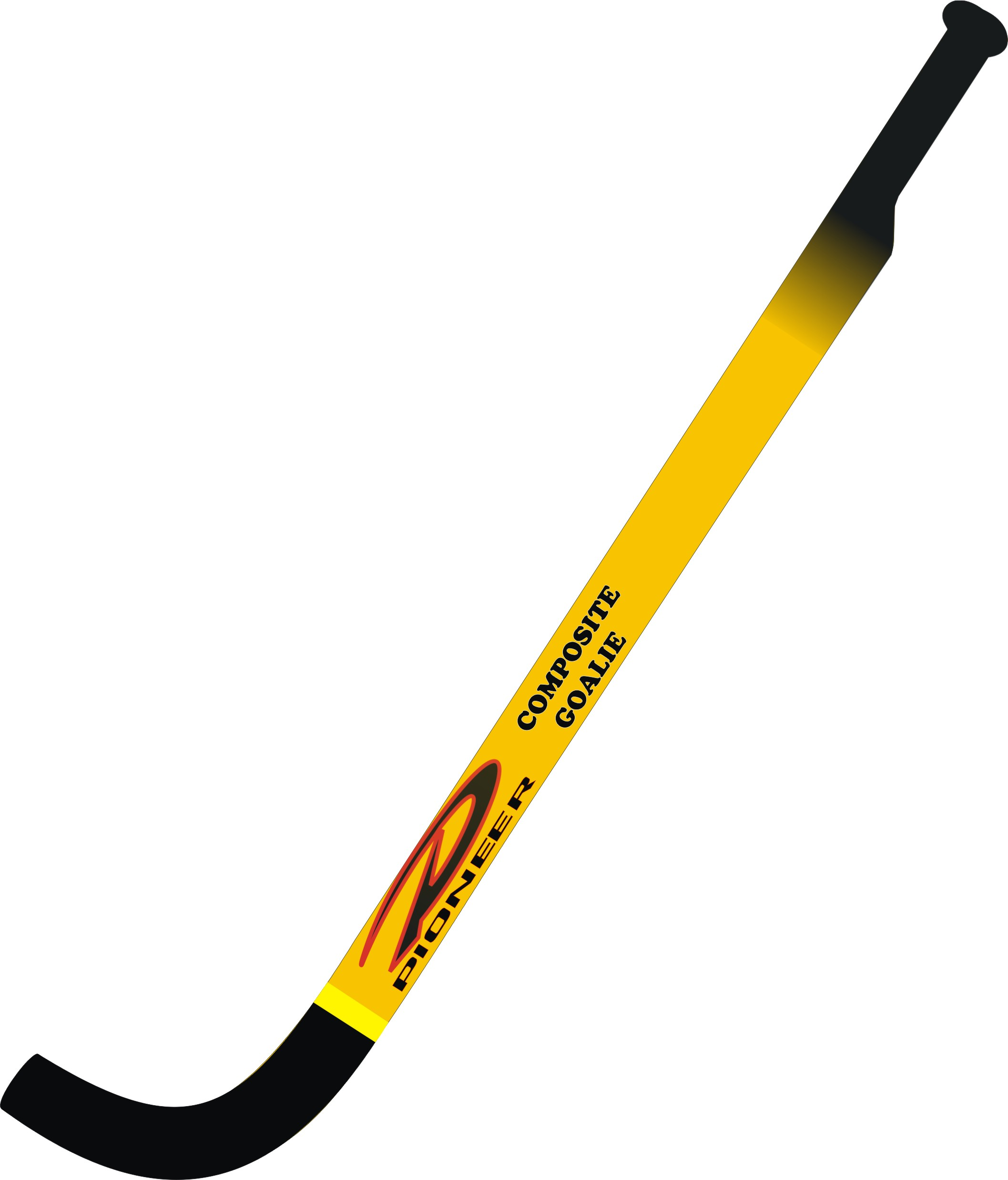
Goalkeeper stick

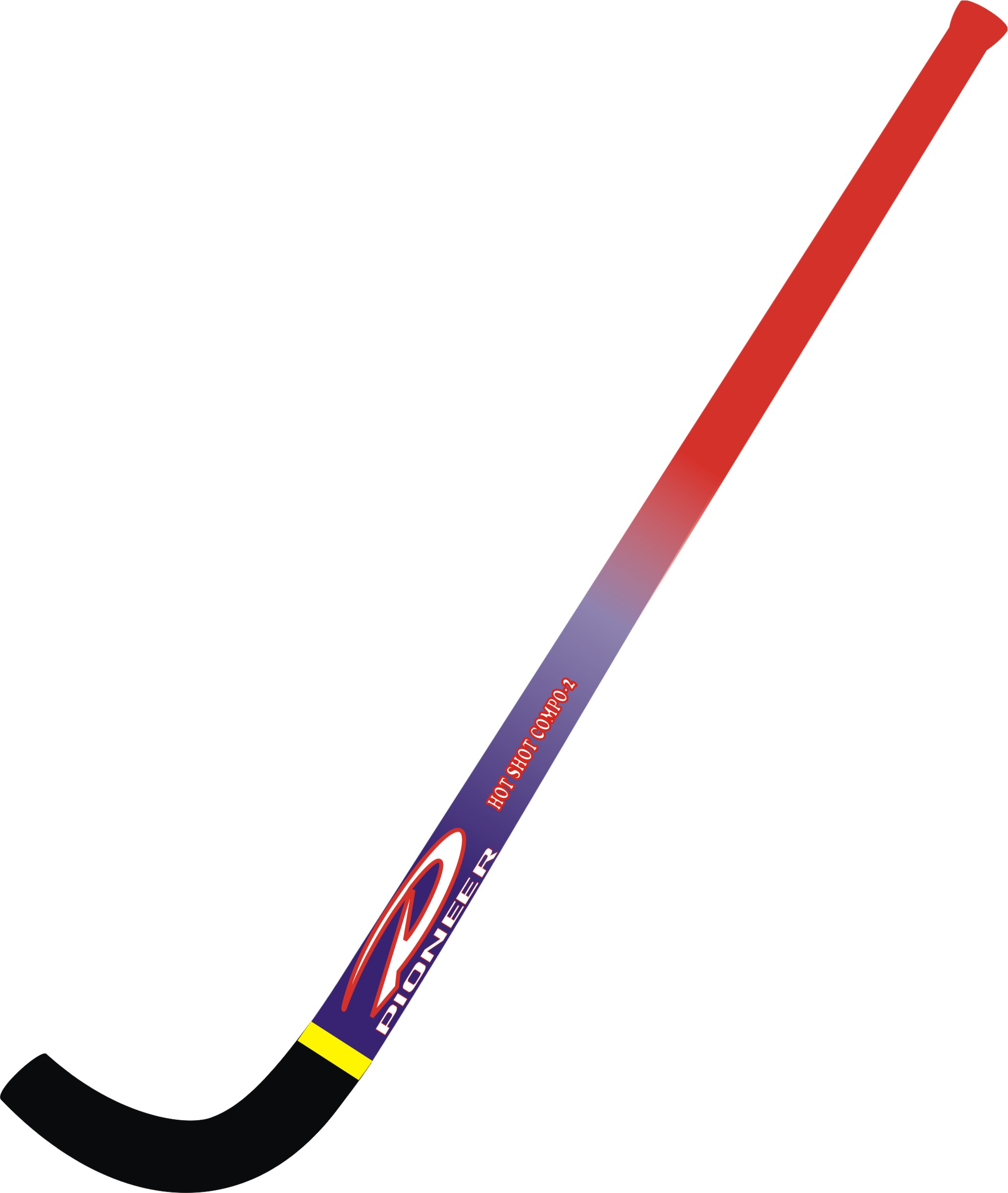
Skater stick

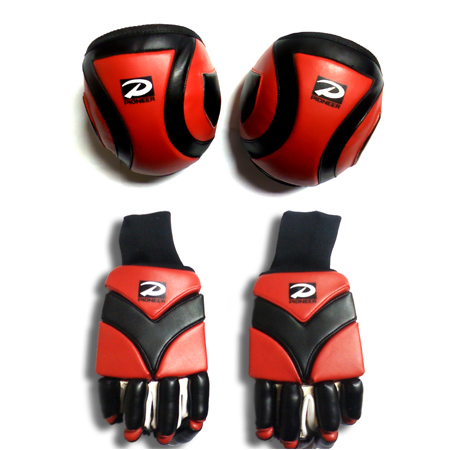
Skater gloves & knee pads

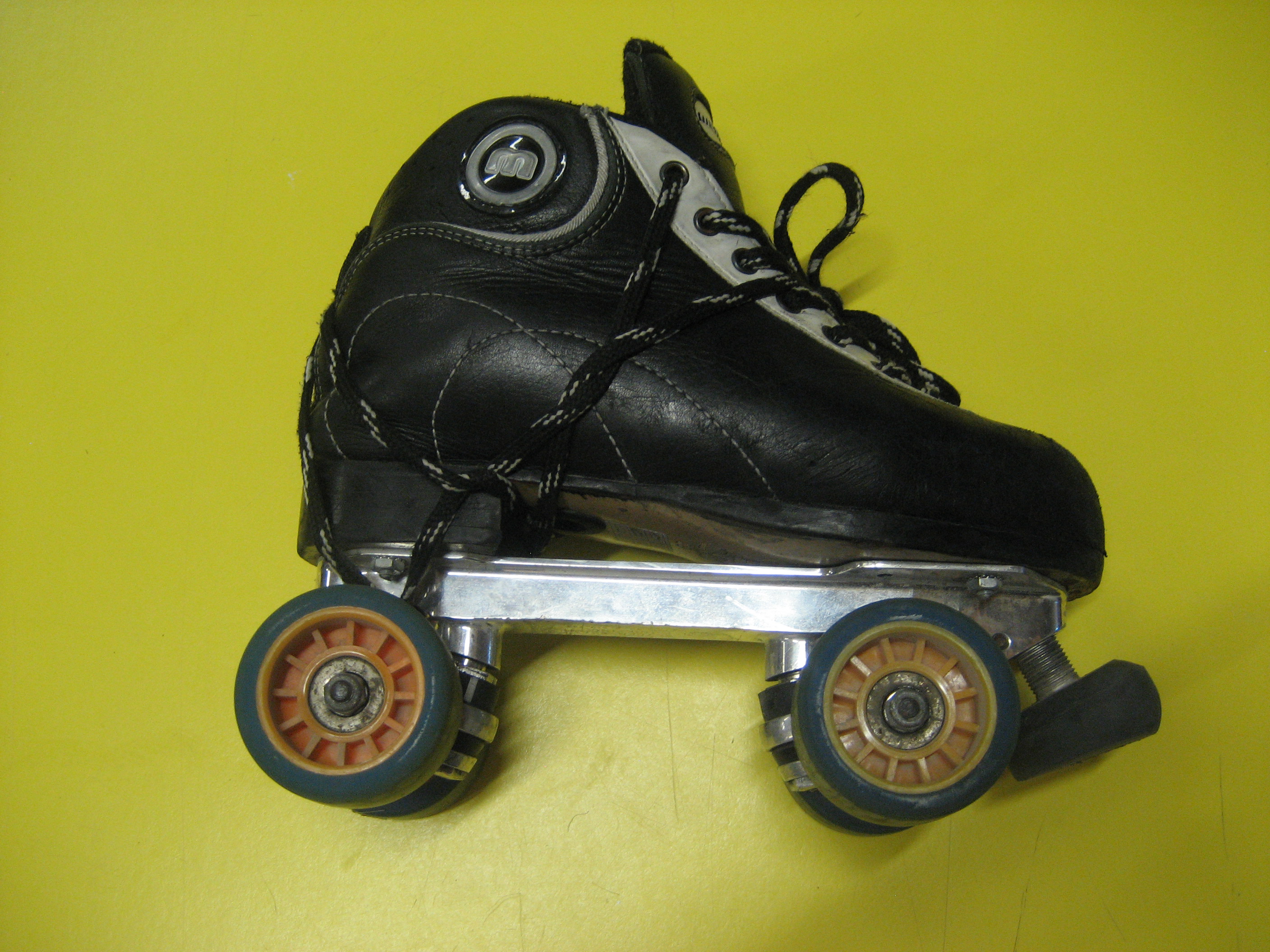
Skate

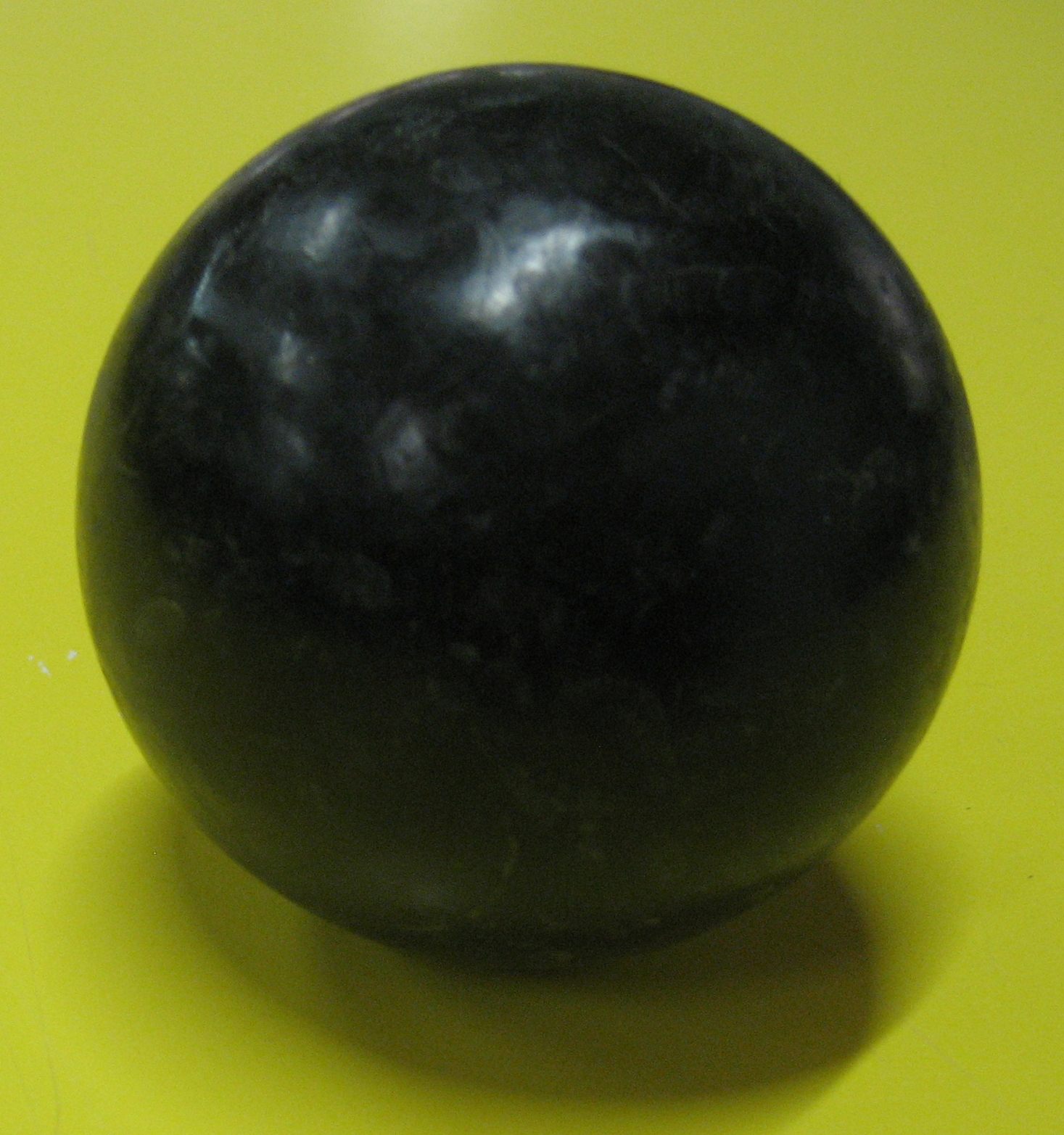
Ball
- The clothing is similar to that used in association football—socks up to the knee, shorts and a shirt.
- Sticks are different for skaters and goalkeepers. They can be of any material approved by the World Skate (although wooden sticks are still most often used), with a minimum length of 90 cm and maximum of 115 cm. They cannot be wider than 5 cm or weigh over 500 g.
- The ball is made of pressed cork, has a 23 cm in circumference, and weighs 155 g.
- The skates must have two pairs of wheels, with a minimum diameter of 3 cm. Players are allowed to use brakes in the front of the skate, with a diameter or larger side not larger than 5 cm.
- Protective material includes shin guards, knee caps, jock strap and gloves. Specifications for helmets and elbow caps vary from federation to federation.
- Goalkeepers (or netminders) use protective padding on the torso (plus shoulders) (the maximum amount is being regulated, since, as in ice hockey, many goalkeepers have been using massive protection to make them larger and broader), neck guard, large shin guards (not longer than 75 cm), gloves protecting the whole forearm and a helmet with either a grid or unbreakable transparent material. Unlike the inline goalie who uses a catch glove to catch the shot on goal, the rink hockey goalie uses a flat batting glove that provides rebound characteristics when blocking a shot on goal.

== Rules ==
World Skate provides the current rulebook at its website.

According to the rule book, the playing time can be reduced depending on the age of the players (competitions played by younger players will have a lower playing time) and the sequence of the competition's matches (a competition disputed in consecutive days can have the playing time reduced with the aim to preserve the health and recovery of the players). The playing time must be defined before the start of each competition.

== International competitions ==
There are several international competitions with national teams.

=== World ===
There are three world championships: men's, women's, and men's U20. Since 2017, World Skate has organised the World Skate Games, comprising all three of the world championships as regulated by the World Skate international federation.

- World Skate Games
  - Roller Hockey World Cup (men)
  - Women's Roller Hockey World Cup
  - Roller Hockey World Cup U-20

=== Africa ===
- Roller Hockey African Championship

=== Americas ===
- Roller Hockey Pan American Championships

=== Asia ===
- Asian Cup

=== Europe ===
- Rink Hockey European Championship
- European Women's Roller Hockey Championship
- World Skate Europe competitions

== Domestic competitions ==
=== Africa ===
- Angola
- Egypt
- Mozambique
- South Africa

=== Americas ===
- Argentina
- Brazil
- Chile
- Colombia
- Mexico
- Uruguay
- USA

=== Asia ===
- India
- Japan
- Pakistan

=== Europe ===
- Austria
- Belgium
- England
- France
- Germany
- Italy
- Israel
- Netherlands
- Portugal
- Spain
- Spain women's
- Switzerland

=== Oceania ===
- Australia
- New Zealand

== See also ==
- Roller hockey at the 1992 Summer Olympics
- Inline hockey
- Indoor field hockey
- Hockey
