= 2021 in sports by month =

2021 in sports describes the year's events in world sport.

== Calendar by month ==
Note: Sports that were originally intended to take place in 2020 but were delayed due to the COVID-19 pandemic are indicated using †.

=== January ===
Date	Sport	Venue/Event	Status	Winner
1–10	Cross-country skiing	(Switzerland) / (Italy) 2021 Tour de Ski	International	Men: (Russia) Alexander Bolshunov; Women: (United States) Jessie Diggins
3–15	Rally raid	(Saudi Arabia) 2021 Dakar Rally	International	Bikes: (Argentina) Kevin Benavides; Quads: (Argentina) Manuel Andújar; Cars: (France) Stéphane Peterhansel; Light Proto: (Czech Republic) Josef Macháček; UTV: (Chile) Francisco López Contardo; Trucks: (Russia) Dmitry Sotnikov
5–18	Association football	(Togo) 2021 WAFU Zone B U-17 Tournament	Regional	Ivory Coast
8–24	Bowls	(England) 2021 World Indoor Bowls Championship	International	Open: (England) Mark Dawes; Women: (Wales) Laura Daniels
9–10	Bobsleigh & Skeleton	(Germany) IBSF European Championships 2021	Continental	Germany
9–10	Luge	(Latvia) 2021 FIL European Luge Championships	Continental	Russia
10–17	Snooker	(England) 2021 Masters (Triple Crown #2)	International	(China) Yan Bingtao
11	American football	(United States) 2021 College Football Playoff National Championship	Domestic	Alabama Crimson Tide
11–13	Judo	(Qatar) 2021 Judo World Masters	International	France
13–31	Handball	(Egypt) 2021 World Men's Handball Championship	International	Denmark
13–8 May	Ice Hockey	(United States) / (Canada) 2020–21 NHL season	Domestic	Colorado Avalanche
16–17	Speed skating	(Netherlands) 2021 European Speed Skating Championships	Continental	Netherlands
16–7 February	Association football	(Cameroon) 2020 African Nations Championship^{†}	Continental	Morocco
18–24	Association football	(Algeria) 2021 UNAF U-17 Tournament	Regional	Algeria
21–24	Rallying	(Monaco) 2021 Monte Carlo Rally (WRC #1)	International	WRC: (France) Sébastien Ogier & (France) Julien Ingrassia ( (Japan) Toyota Gazoo Racing WRT); WRC-2: (Norway) Andreas Mikkelsen & (Norway) Ola Fløene ( (Germany) Toksport WRT); WRC-3: (France) Yohan Rossel & (France) Benoît Fulcrand
22–24	Bobsleigh & Skeleton	(Switzerland) IBSF Junior World Championships 2021	International	Germany
22–24	Short track speed skating	(Poland) 2021 European Short Track Speed Skating Championships	Continental	Men: (Russia) Semion Elistratov; Women: (Netherlands) Suzanne Schulting
23	Association football	(Argentina) 2020 Copa Sudamericana Final^{†}	Continental	(Argentina) Defensa y Justicia
27–31	Badminton	(Thailand) 2020 BWF World Tour Finals	International	Men: (Denmark) Anders Antonsen; Women: (Chinese Taipei) Tai Tzu-ying
27–31	Biathlon	(Poland) 2021 IBU Open European Championships	Continental	Latvia / Poland
29–31	Darts	(England) 2021 Masters	International	(Wales) Jonny Clayton
29–31	Extreme sport	(United States) Winter X Games XXV	International	United States
29–31	Luge	(Germany) 2021 FIL World Luge Championships	International	Germany
30	Association football	(Brazil) 2020 Copa Libertadores Final^{†}	Continental	(Brazil) Palmeiras
30–31	Cyclo-cross	(Belgium) 2021 UCI Cyclo-cross World Championships	International	Men: (Netherlands) Mathieu van der Poel; Women: (Netherlands) Lucinda Brand
30–31	Endurance racing	(United States) 2021 24 Hours of Daytona	International	(United States) Ricky Taylor, (Portugal) Filipe Albuquerque, (United States) Alexander Rossi & (Brazil) Hélio Castroneves ( (United States) Wayne Taylor Racing)
31	American football	(United States) 2021 Pro Bowl	Domestic	Cancelled

=== February ===
Date	Sport	Venue/Event	Status	Winner/s
2–7	Tennis	(Australia) 2021 ATP Cup	International	Russia
3	Association football	(Costa Rica) 2020 CONCACAF League Final	Continental	(Costa Rica) Alajuelense
4–11	Association football	(Qatar) 2020 FIFA Club World Cup^{†}	International	(Germany) Bayern Munich
5–13	Association football	(Senegal) 2021 WAFU Zone A U-17 Tournament	Regional	Senegal
5–14	Bobsleigh & Skeleton	(Germany) IBSF World Championships 2021	International	Germany
6	Basketball	(Argentina) 2021 FIBA Intercontinental Cup	International	(Spain) San Pablo Burgos
6–26 March	Rugby union	(England) / (France) / (Ireland) / (Italy) / (Scotland) / (Wales) 2021 Six Nations Championship	Continental	Wales
7	American football	(United States) Super Bowl LV	Domestic	(Florida) Tampa Bay Buccaneers
8–21	Alpine skiing	(Italy) FIS Alpine World Ski Championships 2021	International	Austria
8–21	Tennis	(Australia) 2021 Australian Open (Grand Slam #1)	International	Men: (Serbia) Novak Djokovic; Women: (Japan) Naomi Osaka
9–14	Nordic skiing	(Finland) 2021 Nordic Junior World Ski Championships	International	Norway
9–16 March	Freestyle skiing & Snowboarding	(Sweden) / (Slovenia) / (Kazakhstan) / (United States) FIS Freestyle Ski and Snowboarding World Championships 2021	International	Russian Ski Federation
9–7 November	Stock car racing	(United States) 2021 NASCAR Cup Series	Domestic	(California) Kyle Larson ( (North Carolina) Hendrick Motorsports)
10–21	Biathlon	(Slovenia) Biathlon World Championships 2021	International	Norway
11–14	Speed skating	(Netherlands) 2021 World Single Distances Speed Skating Championships	International	Netherlands
13–6 November	Stock car racing	(United States) 2021 NASCAR Xfinity Series	Domestic	(North Carolina) Daniel Hemric ( (North Carolina) Joe Gibbs Racing)
14	Stock car racing	(United States) 2021 Daytona 500	Domestic	(Arizona) Michael McDowell ( (North Carolina) Front Row Motorsports)
14–6 March	Association football	(Mauritania) 2021 Africa U-20 Cup of Nations	Continental	Ghana
15–20	Archery	(United Kingdom) 2021 IFAA World Indoor Archery Championships	International	Cancelled
16–20	Badminton	(Finland) 2021 European Mixed Team Badminton Championships	Continental	Denmark
18–28	Curling	(China) 2021 World Junior Curling Championships	International	Cancelled
19–21	Speed skating	(Japan) 2021 World Junior Speed Skating Championships	International	Cancelled
19–25	Multi-sport	(South Korea) 2021 International Children's Games	International	Postponed to 11–16 August 2022
20	Horse racing	(Saudi Arabia) 2021 Saudi Cup	International	Horse: (Republic of Ireland) Mishriff; Jockey: (Republic of Ireland) David Egan; Trainer: (United Kingdom) John Gosden
22–27	Archery	(Slovenia) 2021 European Indoor Archery Championships	Continental	Cancelled
22–28	Ski orienteering	(Estonia) 2021 World Ski Orienteering Championships	International	Neutral Athletes / Norway
22–28	Snooker	(England) 2021 Players Championship (Cazoo Cup #2)	International	(Scotland) John Higgins
24–7 March	Nordic skiing	(Germany) FIS Nordic World Ski Championships 2021	International	Norway
25–28	Golf	(United States) 2021 WGC-Workday Championship (WGC #1)	International	(United States) Collin Morikawa
26–27	Formula racing	(Saudi Arabia) 2021 Diriyah ePrix (FE #1/2)	International	Race 1: (Netherlands) Nyck de Vries ( (Germany) Mercedes-EQ); Race 2: (United Kingdom) Sam Bird ( (United Kingdom) Jaguar Racing)
26–28	Rallying	2021 Arctic Rally Finland (WRC #2)	International	WRC: (Estonia) Ott Tänak & (Estonia) Martin Järveoja ( (South Korea) Hyundai Shell Mobis WRT); WRC-2: (Finland) Esapekka Lappi & (Finland) Janne Ferm ( (Italy) Movisport); WRC-3: (Finland) Teemu Asunmaa & (Finland) Marko Salminen
27–6 March	Biathlon	(Austria) Biathlon Junior World Championships 2021	International	France

=== March ===
1–9	Baseball	(Mexico) 2021 Women's Baseball World Cup	International	Cancelled
3–10	Alpine skiing	(Bulgaria) World Junior Alpine Skiing Championships 2021	International	Austria
3–20	Association football	(Uzbekistan) 2020 AFC U-19 Championship	Continental	Cancelled
5–7	Athletics	(Poland) 2021 European Athletics Indoor Championships	Continental	Netherlands
5–7	Darts	(England) 2021 UK Open	International	(England) James Wade
5–7	Short track speed skating	(Netherlands) 2021 World Short Track Speed Skating Championships	International	Men: (Hungary) Shaoang Liu; Women: (Netherlands) Suzanne Schulting
5–13	Sailing	(Portugal) 2021 470 World Championships	International	Men: Sweden; Women: Spain; Mixed: Israel
5–21	Association football	(Argentina) 2020 Copa Libertadores Femenina^{†}	Continental	(Brazil) Ferroviária
7	Basketball	(United States) 2021 NBA All-Star Game	Domestic	Team LeBron
7–13	Windsurfing	(Portugal) 2021 RS:X European Championships	Continental	Men: (Netherlands) Kiran Badloe; Women: (France) Charline Picon
10–17	Sailing	(New Zealand) 2021 America's Cup	International	Emirates Team New Zealand
11–14	Golf	(United States) 2021 Players Championship	International	(United States) Justin Thomas
13–22	Baseball	(Mexico) 2021 U-15 Baseball World Cup	International	Cancelled
16–19	Swimming	(Argentina) 2021 South American Swimming Championships	Continental	Brazil
18–21	Telemarking	(Switzerland) 2021 World Telemarking Championships	International	Switzerland
18–27	Snowboarding	(Russia) FIS Freestyle Junior World Ski Championships 2021 (Russia) FIS Snowboarding Junior World Championships 2021	International	Ski: Russia; Snowboarding: Russia
18–5 April	Basketball	(United States) 2021 NCAA Division I men's basketball tournament	Domestic	(Texas) Baylor Bears
19–21	Cross-country skiing	(China) 2020–21 FIS Cross-Country World Cup Finals	International	Cancelled
20	Road bicycle racing	(Italy) 2021 Milan–San Remo (Monument #1)	International	(Belgium) Jasper Stuyven ( (United States) Trek–Segafredo)
20–29	Handball	(Iran) 2020 Asian Men's Junior Handball Championship	Continental	Cancelled
21–4 April	Basketball	(United States) 2021 NCAA Division I women's basketball tournament	Domestic	(California) Stanford Cardinal
22–28	Archery	(Mexico) 2021 Pan American Archery Championships	Continental	Colombia
22–28	Figure skating	(Sweden) 2021 World Figure Skating Championships^{†}	International	Men: (United States) Nathan Chen; Ladies: Anna Shcherbakova; Pair: Anastasia Mishina / Aleksandr Galliamov; Ice dance: Victoria Sinitsina / Nikita Katsalapov
22–28	Snooker	(Wales) 2021 Tour Championship (Cazoo Cup #3)	International	(Australia) Neil Robertson
23–3 April	Futsal	(Kuwait) 2020 AFC Futsal Championship	Continental	Cancelled
24–28	Golf	(United States) 2021 WGC-Dell Technologies Match Play (WGC #2)	International	(United States) Billy Horschel
24–4 April	Tennis	(United States) 2021 Miami Open^{†}	International	Men: (Poland) Hubert Hurkacz; Women: (Australia) Ashleigh Barty
26–28	Gymnastics	(Japan) 2021 World Parkour Championships	International	Cancelled
27	Horse racing	(United Arab Emirates) 2021 Dubai World Cup	International	Horse: (United States) Mystic Guide; Jockey: (Panama) Luis Saez; Trainer: (United States) Michael Stidham
27–28	Formula racing	(Bahrain) 2021 Sakhir Formula 2 round (F2 #1)	International	Sprint race 1: (New Zealand) Liam Lawson ( (United Kingdom) Hitech Grand Prix); Sprint race 2: (Australia) Oscar Piastri ( (Italy) Prema Racing); Feature race: (China) Guanyu Zhou ( (United Kingdom) UNI-Virtuosi Racing)
28	Formula racing	2021 Bahrain Grand Prix (F1 #1)	International	(United Kingdom) Lewis Hamilton ( (Germany) Mercedes)
28	Motorcycle racing	2021 Qatar motorcycle Grand Prix (MotoGP #1)	International	MotoGP: (Spain) Maverick Viñales ( (Japan) Monster Energy Yamaha MotoGP); Moto2: (United Kingdom) Sam Lowes ( (Belgium) Elf Marc VDS Racing Team); Moto3: (Spain) Jaume Masiá ( (Finland) Red Bull KTM Ajo)
30–4 April	Bandy	(Russia) 2021 Bandy World Championship	International	Cancelled
31–17 April	Association football	(Bahrain) 2020 AFC U-16 Championship	Continental	Cancelled

=== April ===
Date	Sport	Venue/Event	Status	Winner/s
1–4	Golf	(United States) 2021 ANA Inspiration	International	(Thailand) Patty Tavatanakit
1–3 October	Baseball	(United States) / (Canada) 2021 Major League Baseball season	Domestic	(Georgia (U.S. state)) Atlanta Braves
2–9	Beach handball	(Qatar) 2020 Asian Youth Beach Handball Championship	Continental	Postponed to 22–28 March 2022
2–10	Multi-sport	(China) 2021 Asian Beach Games	Continental	Postponed to 2023
2–11	Curling	(Canada) 2021 World Men's Curling Championship	International	Sweden
3–4	Off-road racing	(Saudi Arabia) 2021 Desert X-Prix (Extreme E #1)	International	(Sweden) Johan Kristoffersson & (Australia) Molly Taylor ( (Germany) Rosberg X Racing)
3–5	Field hockey	(Netherlands) 2021 Euro Hockey League (Netherlands) 2021 Euro Hockey League Women	Continental	Men: (Netherlands) Bloemendaal; Women: (Netherlands) Den Bosch
3–11	Fencing	(Egypt) 2021 Junior and Cadet World Fencing Championships	International	Russia
3–11	Weightlifting	(Russia) 2021 European Weightlifting Championships	Continental	Ukraine
3–25	Rugby union	(England) / (France) / (Ireland) / (Italy) / (Scotland) / (Wales) 2021 Women's Six Nations Championship	Continental	England
4	Motorcycle racing	(Qatar) 2021 Doha motorcycle Grand Prix (MotoGP #2)	International	MotoGP: (France) Fabio Quartararo ( (Japan) Monster Energy Yamaha MotoGP); Moto2: (United Kingdom) Sam Lowes ( (Belgium) Elf Marc VDS Racing Team); Moto3: (Spain) Pedro Acosta ( (Finland) Red Bull KTM Ajo)
4	Road bicycle racing	(Belgium) 2021 Tour of Flanders (Monument #2)	International	(Denmark) Kasper Asgreen ( (Belgium) Deceuninck–Quick-Step)
5–27 May	Darts	(England) 2021 Premier League Darts	International	(Wales) Jonny Clayton
6–9	Judo	(Kyrgyzstan) 2021 Asian-Pacific Judo Championships	Continental	South Korea
6–11	Wrestling	(Morocco) 2021 African Wrestling Championships	Continental	Postponed to 17–22 May 2022
7–14	Association football	(Argentina) / (Brazil) 2021 Recopa Sudamericana	Continental	(Argentina) Defensa y Justicia
8–11	Golf	(United States) 2021 Masters Tournament (Grand Slam #1)	International	(Japan) Hideki Matsuyama
8–11	Taekwondo	(Bulgaria) 2021 European Taekwondo Championships	Continental	Russia
9–11	Rowing	(Italy) 2021 European Rowing Championships	Continental	Great Britain
10	Horse racing	(United Kingdom) 2021 Grand National	International	Horse: (Republic of Ireland) Minella Times; Jockey: (Republic of Ireland) Rachael Blackmore; Trainer: (Republic of Ireland) Henry de Bromhead
10–11	Formula racing	(Italy) 2021 Rome ePrix (FE #3/4)	International	Race 1: (France) Jean-Éric Vergne ( (China) DS Techeetah); Race 2: (Belgium) Stoffel Vandoorne ( (Germany) Mercedes-EQ)
11–18	Tennis	(Monaco) 2021 Monte-Carlo Masters^{†}	International	(Greece) Stefanos Tsitsipas
13–18	Wrestling	(Kazakhstan) 2021 Asian Wrestling Championships	Continental	Freestyle: Iran; Greco-Roman: Iran; Women: Mongolia
13–23	Amateur boxing	(Poland) 2021 AIBA Youth World Boxing Championships	International	India
15–16	Judo	(Mexico) 2021 Pan American Judo Championships	Continental	Brazil
15–18	Figure skating	(Japan) 2021 ISU World Team Trophy	International	Russia
16–18	Basketball	(Turkey) 2021 EuroLeague Women Final Four	Continental	(Russia) UMMC Ekaterinburg
16–18	Judo	(Portugal) 2021 European Judo Championships	Continental	Kosovo
16–25	Weightlifting	(Uzbekistan) 2020 Asian Weightlifting Championships^{†}	Continental	China
17–3 May	Snooker	(England) 2021 World Snooker Championship (Triple Crown #3)	International	(England) Mark Selby
18	Formula racing	(Italy) 2021 Emilia Romagna Grand Prix (F1 #2)	International	(Netherlands) Max Verstappen ( (Austria) Red Bull Racing-Honda)
18	Motorcycle racing	(Portugal) 2021 Portuguese motorcycle Grand Prix (MotoGP #3)	International	MotoGP: (France) Fabio Quartararo ( (Japan) Monster Energy Yamaha MotoGP); Moto2: (Spain) Raúl Fernández ( (Finland) Red Bull KTM Ajo); Moto3: (Spain) Pedro Acosta ( (Finland) Red Bull KTM Ajo)
18–26 September	Indy car racing	(United States) / (Canada) 2021 IndyCar Series	International	(Spain) Álex Palou ( (United States) Chip Ganassi Racing)
19–24	Weightlifting	(Dominican Republic) 2020 Pan American Weightlifting Championships^{†}	Continental	Colombia
19–25	Wrestling	(Poland) 2021 European Wrestling Championships	Continental	Russia
19–28	Chess	(Russia) Candidates Tournament 2020–21	International	(Russia) Ian Nepomniachtchi
21–25	Artistic gymnastics	(Switzerland) 2021 European Artistic Gymnastics Championships	Continental	Russia
22–25	Rallying	2021 Croatia Rally (WRC #3)	International	WRC: (France) Sébastien Ogier & (France) Julien Ingrassia ( (Japan) Toyota Gazoo Racing WRT); WRC-2: (Norway) Mads Østberg & (Norway) Torstein Eriksen ( (Hungary) TRT World Rally Team); WRC-3: (Poland) Kajetan Kajetanowicz & (Poland) Maciej Szczepaniak; J-WRC: (United Kingdom) Jon Armstrong & (United Kingdom) Phil Hall
23–27	Windsurfing	(Spain) 2021 RS:X World Championships	International	Men: (Netherlands) Kiran Badloe; Women: (Netherlands) Lilian de Geus
23–2 May	Association football	(Curaçao) 2021 Caribbean Club Shield	Regional	Cancelled
24–25	Formula racing	(Spain) 2021 Valencia ePrix (FE #5/6)	International	Race 1: (Netherlands) Nyck de Vries ( (Germany) Mercedes-EQ); Race 2: (United Kingdom) Jake Dennis ( (United States) BMW i Andretti Motorsport)
25	Road bicycle racing	(Belgium) 2021 Liège–Bastogne–Liège (Monument #3)	International	(Slovenia) Tadej Pogačar ( (United Arab Emirates) UAE Team Emirates)
26–6 May	Ice hockey	(United States) 2021 IIHF World U18 Championships	International	Canada
27–2 May	Badminton	(China) 2021 Badminton Asia Championships	Continental	Cancelled
27–2 May	Badminton	(Ukraine) 2021 European Badminton Championships	Continental	Men: (Denmark) Anders Antonsen; Women: (Spain) Carolina Marín
28–2 May	Badminton	(Guatemala) 2021 Pan Am Badminton Championships	Continental	Men: (Canada) Brian Yang; Women: (United States) Beiwen Zhang
28–8 May	Beach soccer	(Thailand) 2021 AFC Beach Soccer Asian Cup	Continental	Cancelled
29–2 May	Trampolining	(Russia) 2021 European Trampoline Championships	Continental	Russia
29–9 May	Tennis	(Spain) 2021 Madrid Open^{†}	International	Men: (Germany) Alexander Zverev; Women: (Belarus) Aryna Sabalenka
30–9 May	Curling	(Canada) 2021 World Women's Curling Championship	International	Switzerland

=== May ===
Date	Sport	Venue/Event	Status	Winner/s
1	Endurance racing	(Belgium) 2021 6 Hours of Spa-Francorchamps (WEC #1)	International	Hypercar: (Switzerland) Sébastien Buemi, (New Zealand) Brendon Hartley & (Japan) Kazuki Nakajima ( (Japan) Toyota Gazoo Racing); LMP2: (Portugal) Filipe Albuquerque, (United Kingdom) Philip Hanson & (Switzerland) Fabio Scherer ( (United States) United Autosports USA); LMGTE Pro: (France) Kévin Estre & (Switzerland) Neel Jani ( (Germany) Porsche GT Team); LMGTE Am: (Denmark) Nicklas Nielsen, (France) François Perrodo & (Italy) Alessio Rovera ( (Italy) AF Corse)
1	Horse racing	(United States) 2021 Kentucky Derby (Triple Crown #1)	Domestic	Horse: (United States) Medina Spirit; Jockey: (Puerto Rico) John Velazquez; Trainer: (United States) Bob Baffert
1	Volleyball	(Italy) 2020–21 CEV Champions League Final	Continental	(Poland) ZAKSA Kędzierzyn-Koźle
1–2	Athletics	(Poland) 2021 World Athletics Relays	International	Poland
1–6	Diving	(Japan) 2021 FINA Diving World Cup	International	Great Britain
2	Formula racing	(Portugal) 2021 Portuguese Grand Prix (F1 #3)	International	(United Kingdom) Lewis Hamilton ( (Germany) Mercedes)
2	Motorcycle racing	(Spain) 2021 Spanish motorcycle Grand Prix (MotoGP #4)	International	MotoGP: (Australia) Jack Miller ( (Italy) Ducati Lenovo Team); Moto2: (Italy) Fabio Di Giannantonio ( (Italy) Federal Oil Gresini Moto2); Moto3: (Spain) Pedro Acosta ( (Finland) Red Bull KTM Ajo); MotoE: (Italy) Alessandro Zaccone ( (Italy) Octo Pramac MotoE)
3	Futsal	(Croatia) 2021 UEFA Futsal Champions League Final	Continental	(Portugal) Sporting CP
3–9	Futsal	(Guatemala) 2021 CONCACAF Futsal Championship	Continental	Costa Rica
3–9	Multi-sport	(Kazakhstan) 2021 World Combat Games	International	Cancelled
6–9	Canoe slalom	(Italy) 2021 European Canoe Slalom Championships	Continental	Czech Republic
6–22	Association football	(Cyprus) 2021 UEFA European Under-17 Championship	Continental	Cancelled
8	Formula racing	2021 Monaco ePrix (FE #7)	International	(Portugal) António Félix da Costa ( (China) DS Techeetah)
8–9	Formula racing	(Spain) 2021 Barcelona Formula 3 round (F3 #1)	International	Race 1: (Russia) Aleksandr Smolyar ( (France) ART Grand Prix); Race 2: (United Kingdom) Olli Caldwell ( (Italy) Prema Racing); Race 3: (Norway) Dennis Hauger ( (Italy) Prema Racing)
8–9	Athletics	(Croatia) 2021 European Throwing Cup	Continental	Poland
8–30	Road bicycle racing	(Italy) 2021 Giro d'Italia (Grand Tour #1)	International	(Colombia) Egan Bernal ( (United Kingdom) Ineos Grenadiers)
9	Formula racing	(Spain) 2021 Spanish Grand Prix (F1 #4)	International	(United Kingdom) Lewis Hamilton ( (Germany) Mercedes)
9–14	Nine-ball pool	(England) 2021 World Cup of Pool	International	Germany (Joshua Filler & Christoph Reintjes)
9–16	Tennis	(Italy) 2021 Italian Open	International	Men: (Spain) Rafael Nadal; Women: (Poland) Iga Świątek
10–23	Aquatics	(Hungary) 2020 European Aquatics Championships^{†}	Continental	Russia
13–16	Orienteering	(Switzerland) 2021 European Orienteering Championships	Continental	Sweden
14–16	Aesthetic group gymnastics	(Russia) 2021 European Aesthetic Group Gymnastics Championships	Continental	Russia
15	Association football	(Samoa) 2021 OFC Champions League Final	Continental	Cancelled
15	Horse racing	(United States) 2021 Preakness Stakes (Triple Crown #2)	Domestic	Horse: (United States) Rombauer; Jockey: (France) Flavien Prat; Trainer: (United States) Michael McCarthy
15–25	Association football	(Dominican Republic) 2021 Caribbean Club Championship	Regional	(Haiti) Cavaly
15–7 July	Ice hockey	(Canada) / (United States) 2021 Stanley Cup playoffs	Domestic	(Florida) Tampa Bay Lightning
16	Association football	(Sweden) 2021 UEFA Women's Champions League Final	Continental	(Spain) Barcelona
16	Athletics	(Czech Republic) 2021 European Race Walking Team Championships	Continental	Spain
16	Motorcycle racing	(France) 2021 French motorcycle Grand Prix (MotoGP #5)	International	MotoGP: (Australia) Jack Miller ( (Italy) Ducati Lenovo Team); Moto2: (Spain) Raúl Fernández ( (Finland) Red Bull KTM Ajo); Moto3: (Spain) Sergio García ( (Spain) Gaviota GasGas Aspar Team); MotoE: (Brazil) Eric Granado ( (Malaysia) One Energy Racing)
16–22	Futsal	(Uruguay) 2021 Copa Libertadores de Futsal	Continental	(Argentina) San Lorenzo
16–22	Para swimming	(Portugal) 2020 World Para Swimming European Open Championships^{†}	Continental	Italy
17–23	Beach soccer	(Costa Rica) 2021 CONCACAF Beach Soccer Championship	Continental	El Salvador
17–23	Curling	(Scotland) 2021 World Mixed Doubles Curling Championship	International	Scotland
19–23	Karate	(Croatia) 2021 European Karate Championships	Continental	Turkey
20	Association football	(Switzerland) 2021 UEFA Youth League Final	Continental	Cancelled
20–23	Rallying	2021 Rally de Portugal (WRC #4)	International	WRC: (United Kingdom) Elfyn Evans & (United Kingdom) Scott Martin ( (Japan) Toyota Gazoo Racing WRT); WRC-2: (Finland) Esapekka Lappi & (Finland) Janne Ferm ( (Italy) Movisport); WRC-3: (Poland) Kajetan Kajetanowicz & (Poland) Maciej Szczepaniak; J-WRC: (Latvia) Mārtiņš Sesks & (Latvia) Francis Renars ( (Latvia) LMT Autosporta Akademija)
20–23	Golf	(United States) 2021 PGA Championship (Grand Slam #2)	International	(United States) Phil Mickelson
20–23	Judo	(Senegal) 2021 African Judo Championships	Continental	Tunisia
20–29	Futsal	(Egypt) 2021 Arab Futsal Cup	International	Morocco
20–12 June	Association football	(Indonesia) 2021 FIFA U-20 World Cup	International	Cancelled
21–22	Formula racing	(Monaco) 2021 Monte Carlo Formula 2 round (F2 #2)	International	Sprint race 1: (China) Guanyu Zhou ( (United Kingdom) UNI-Virtuosi Racing); Sprint race 2: (United Kingdom) Dan Ticktum ( (United Kingdom) Carlin); Feature race: (France) Théo Pourchaire ( (France) ART Grand Prix)
21–6 June	Ice hockey	(Latvia) 2021 IIHF World Championship	International	Canada
22	Rugby union	(England) 2021 European Rugby Champions Cup Final	Continental	(France) Toulouse
22–25	Nine-ball pool	(Gibraltar) 2021 World Pool Masters	International	(Greece) Alexander Kazakis
22–5 June	Shooting	(Croatia) 2021 European Shooting Championships	Continental	Russia
22–20 July	Basketball	(United States) 2021 NBA playoffs	Domestic	(Wisconsin) Milwaukee Bucks
23	Formula racing	2021 Monaco Grand Prix (F1 #5)^{†}	International	(Netherlands) Max Verstappen ( (Austria) Red Bull Racing-Honda)
23–29	Beach soccer	(Senegal) 2021 Africa Beach Soccer Cup of Nations	Continental	Senegal
23–31	Amateur boxing	(United Arab Emirates) 2021 Asian Amateur Boxing Championships	Continental	Kazakhstan
23–31	Weightlifting	(Uzbekistan) 2021 Junior World Weightlifting Championships	International	Kazakhstan
25–25 June	Volleyball	(Italy) 2021 FIVB Volleyball Women's Nations League	International	United States
26	Association football	(Poland) 2021 UEFA Europa League Final	Continental	(Spain) Villarreal
26–27	Artistic gymnastics	(Egypt) 2021 African Artistic Gymnastics Championships	Continental	Men: (Egypt) Omar Mohamed; Women: (Egypt) Zeina Ibrahim
27–29	Aerobic gymnastics	(Azerbaijan) 2021 Aerobic Gymnastics World Championships	International	Russian Gymnastics Federation
27–29	Weightlifting	(Kenya) 2021 African Weightlifting Championships	Continental	Tunisia
27–30	Wrestling	(Guatemala) 2021 Pan American Wrestling Championships	Continental	United States
28	Association football	(Qatar) 2021 CAF Super Cup	Continental	(Egypt) Al Ahly
28–30	Basketball	(Germany) 2021 EuroLeague Final Four	Continental	(Turkey) Anadolu Efes
28–27 June	Volleyball	(Italy) 2021 FIVB Volleyball Men's Nations League	International	Brazil
29	Association football	(Portugal) 2021 UEFA Champions League Final	Continental	(England) Chelsea
29–30	Athletics	(Poland) 2021 European Athletics Team Championships (Super League)	Continental	Poland
29–30	Handball	(Hungary) 2020–21 Women's EHF Champions League (Final Four)	Continental	(Norway) Vipers Kristiansand
29–30	Off-road racing	(Senegal) 2021 Ocean X-Prix (Extreme E #2)	International	(Sweden) Johan Kristoffersson & (Australia) Molly Taylor ( (Germany) Rosberg X Racing)
29–31	Athletics	(Ecuador) 2021 South American Championships in Athletics	Continental	Brazil
29–6 June	Surfing	(El Salvador) 2021 ISA World Surfing Games	International	Men: (France) Joan Duru; Women: (Australia) Sally Fitzgibbons
30	Motorcycle racing	(Italy) 2021 Italian motorcycle Grand Prix (MotoGP #6)	International	MotoGP: (France) Fabio Quartararo ( (Japan) Monster Energy Yamaha MotoGP); Moto2: (Australia) Remy Gardner ( (Finland) Red Bull KTM Ajo); Moto3: (Italy) Dennis Foggia ( (Luxembourg) Leopard Racing)
30	Indy car racing	(United States) 2021 Indianapolis 500	International	(Brazil) Hélio Castroneves
30–6 June	Street skateboarding	(Italy) 2021 Street Skateboarding World Championships	International	Men: (Japan) Yuto Horigome; Women: (Japan) Aori Nishimura
30–13 June	Tennis	(France) 2021 French Open (Grand Slam #2)	International	Men: (Serbia) Novak Djokovic; Women: (Czech Republic) Barbora Krejčíková
31–6 June	Archery	(Turkey) 2021 European Archery Championships	Continental	Russia
31–6 June	Association football	(Hungary) / (Slovenia) 2021 UEFA European Under-21 Championship knockout stage	Continental	Germany

=== June ===
Date	Sport	Venue/Event	Status	Winner/s
1–5	Para-athletics	(Poland) 2021 World Para Athletics European Championships	Continental	Russia
3–4	Taekwondo	(Mexico) 2021 Pan American Taekwondo Championships	Continental	Mexico
3–5	Water polo	(Serbia) 2020–21 LEN Champions League (Final 8)	Continental	(Italy) Pro Recco
3–6	Association football	(United States) 2021 CONCACAF Nations League Finals	Continental	United States
3–6	Canoe sprint	(Poland) 2021 Canoe Sprint European Championships	Continental	Hungary
3–6	Golf	(United States) 2021 U.S. Women's Open	International	(Philippines) Yuka Saso
3–6	Rallying	(Italy) 2021 Rally Italia Sardegna (WRC #5)	International	WRC: (France) Sébastien Ogier & (France) Julien Ingrassia ( (Japan) Toyota Gazoo Racing WRT); WRC-2: (Finland) Jari Huttunen & (Finland) Mikko Lukka ( (South Korea) Hyundai Motorsport N); WRC-3: (France) Yohan Rossel & (France) Alexandre Coria
4–8	Freestyle BMX	(France) 2021 UCI Urban Cycling World Championships	International	United States
4–12	Field hockey	(Netherlands) 2021 Men's EuroHockey Nations Championship	Continental	Netherlands
4–13	Gymnastics	(Brazil) 2021 Pan American Gymnastics Championships	Continental	Brazil
5	Athletics	(United Kingdom) 2021 European 10,000m Cup	Continental	Men: (France) Morhad Amdouni; Women: (United Kingdom) Eilish McColgan
5	Horse racing	(United States) 2021 Belmont Stakes (Triple Crown #3)	Domestic	Horse: (United States) Essential Quality; Jockey: (Panama) Luis Saez; Trainer: (United States) Brad H. Cox
5	Horse racing	(United Kingdom) 2021 Epsom Derby	International	Horse: (Republic of Ireland) Adayar; Jockey: (United Kingdom) Adam Kirby; Trainer: (United Kingdom) Charlie Appleby
5–6	Formula racing	(Azerbaijan) 2021 Baku Formula 2 round (F2 #3)	International	Sprint race 1: (Russia) Robert Shwartzman ( (Italy) Prema Racing); Sprint race 2: (Estonia) Jüri Vips ( (United Kingdom) Hitech Grand Prix); Feature race: (Estonia) Jüri Vips ( (United Kingdom) Hitech Grand Prix)
5–6	Taekwondo	(Senegal) 2021 African Taekwondo Championships	Continental	Tunisia
5–13	Field hockey	(Netherlands) 2021 Women's EuroHockey Nations Championship	Continental	Netherlands
5–17	Handball	(Kazakhstan) 2020 Asian Men's Youth Handball Championship	Continental	Cancelled
6	Formula racing	2021 Azerbaijan Grand Prix (F1 #6)^{†}	International	(Mexico) Sergio Pérez ( (Austria) Red Bull Racing-Honda)
6	Motorcycle racing	(Catalonia) 2021 Catalan motorcycle Grand Prix (MotoGP #7)	International	MotoGP: (Portugal) Miguel Oliveira ( (Austria) Red Bull KTM Factory Racing); Moto2: (Australia) Remy Gardner ( (Finland) Red Bull KTM Ajo); Moto3: (Spain) Sergio García ( (Spain) Gaviota GasGas Aspar Team)
6–10	Nine-ball pool	(England) 2021 WPA World Nine-ball Championship	International	(Austria) Albin Ouschan
6–13	Judo	(Hungary) 2021 World Judo Championships	International	Japan
8–10	Rhythmic gymnastics	(Uzbekistan) 2021 Asian Rhythmic Gymnastics Championships	Continental	Uzbekistan
8–14	Modern pentathlon	(Egypt) 2021 World Modern Pentathlon Championships	International	Hungary
8–18	Handball	(Cameroon) 2021 African Women's Handball Championship	Continental	Angola
9–13	Para-cycling	(Portugal) 2021 UCI Para-cycling Road World Championships	International	Italy
9–13	Rhythmic gymnastics	(Bulgaria) 2021 Rhythmic Gymnastics European Championships	Continental	Russia
11–13	Triathlon	(Egypt) 2021 Africa Triathlon Championships	Continental	Men: (South Africa) Henri Schoeman; Women: (South Africa) Simone Ackermann
11–17	Association football	(Tajikistan) 2021 CAFA U-20 Women's Championship	Regional	Uzbekistan
11–19	Basketball	(Puerto Rico) 2021 FIBA Women's AmeriCup	Continental	United States
11–9 July	Association football	(Cameroon) 2021 Africa Cup of Nations	Continental	Postponed to 9 January–6 February 2022
11–11 July	Association football	(Azerbaijan) / (Denmark) / (England) / (Germany) / (Hungary) / (Italy) / (Netherlands) / (Romania) / (Russia) / (Scotland) / (Spain) UEFA Euro 2020^{†}	Continental	Italy
12	Triathlon	(Australia) 2021 Oceania Triathlon Championships	Continental	Men: (Australia) Luke Willian; Women: (Australia) Jaz Hedgeland
12–13	Handball	(Germany) 2020–21 EHF Champions League (Final Four)	Continental	(Spain) Barça
13	Endurance racing	(Portugal) 2021 8 Hours of Portimão (WEC #2)	International	Hypercar: (Switzerland) Sébastien Buemi, (New Zealand) Brendon Hartley & (Japan) Kazuki Nakajima ( (Japan) Toyota Gazoo Racing); LMP2: (United Kingdom) Anthony Davidson, (Portugal) António Félix da Costa & (Mexico) Roberto González ( (United Kingdom) Jota); LMGTE Pro: (United Kingdom) James Calado & (Italy) Alessandro Pier Guidi ( (Italy) AF Corse); LMGTE Am: (Italy) Antonio Fuoco, (Italy) Roberto Lacorte & (Italy) Giorgio Sernagiotto ( (Italy) Cetilar Racing)
13–19	Finswimming	(Italy) 2021 World Junior Finswimming Championship	International	Russia
13–10 July	Association football	(Brazil) 2021 Copa América^{†}	Continental	Argentina
14–19	Water polo	(Greece) 2020 FINA Women's Water Polo World League Super Final	International	United States
15–25	Amateur boxing	(Italy) 2021 European U22 Boxing Championships	Continental	Russia
16–18	Taekwondo	(Lebanon) 2021 Asian Taekwondo Championships	Continental	South Korea
17–20	Golf	(United States) 2021 U.S. Open (Grand Slam #3)	International	(Spain) Jon Rahm
17–27	Basketball	(France) / (Spain) EuroBasket Women 2021	Continental	Serbia
18–20	Artistic gymnastics	(Mexico) 2021 Junior Pan American Artistic Gymnastics Championships	Continental	United States
18–20	Triathlon	(Austria) 2021 Europe Triathlon Sprint and Relay Championships	Continental	Men: (Switzerland) Max Studer; Women: (Germany) Laura Lindemann; Mixed Relay: Great Britain
18–23	Test cricket	(England) 2021 ICC World Test Championship Final	International	New Zealand
19–20	Formula racing	(Mexico) 2021 Puebla ePrix (FE #8/9)	International	Race 1: (Brazil) Lucas di Grassi ( (Germany) Audi Sport ABT Schaeffler Formula E Team); Race 2: (Switzerland) Edoardo Mortara ( (Monaco) RoKiT Venturi Racing)
19–20	Formula racing	(France) 2021 Le Castellet Formula 3 round (F3 #2)	International	Race 1: (Russia) Aleksandr Smolyar ( (France) ART Grand Prix); Race 2: (Monaco) Arthur Leclerc ( (Italy) Prema Powerteam); Race 3: (Australia) Jack Doohan ( (Italy) Trident)
19–26	Para ice hockey	(Czech Republic) 2021 World Para Ice Hockey Championships	International	United States
19–30	Baseball	(United States) 2021 College World Series	Domestic	Mississippi State
20	Formula racing	(France) 2021 French Grand Prix (F1 #7)^{†}	International	(Netherlands) Max Verstappen ( (Austria) Red Bull Racing-Honda)
20	Motorcycle racing	(Germany) 2021 German motorcycle Grand Prix (MotoGP #8)	International	MotoGP: (Spain) Marc Márquez ( (Japan) Repsol Honda Team); Moto2: (Australia) Remy Gardner ( (Finland) Red Bull KTM Ajo); Moto3: (Spain) Pedro Acosta ( (Finland) Red Bull KTM Ajo)
20–6 July	Association football	(Egypt) 2021 Arab Cup U-20	International	Saudi Arabia
21–26	Softball	(Czech Republic) 2020 Men's Softball European Championship^{†}	Continental	Czech Republic
22–27	Squash	(Egypt) 2021 Men's PSA World Tour Finals (Egypt) 2021 Women's PSA World Tour Finals	International	Men: (Egypt) Mostafa Asal; Women: (Egypt) Nouran Gohar
22–27	Table tennis	(Poland) 2020 European Table Tennis Championships	Continental	Men: (Germany) Timo Boll; Women: (Germany) Petrissa Solja
22–3 July	Handball	(Hungary) 2021 Men's Junior World Handball Championship	International	Cancelled
23–29	Track cycling	(Peru) 2021 Pan American Track Cycling Championships	Continental	Colombia
24	Aquathlon	(Austria) 2021 Europe Triathlon Aquathlon Championships	Continental	Men: (Italy) Michele Bortolamedi; Women: (Italy) Bianca Seregni
24–27	Golf	(United States) 2021 Women's PGA Championship	International	(United States) Nelly Korda
24–27	Rallying	(Kenya) 2021 Safari Rally (WRC #6)	International	WRC: (France) Sébastien Ogier & (France) Julien Ingrassia ( (Japan) Toyota Gazoo Racing WRT); WRC-2: No classified finishers; WRC-3: (Kenya) Onkar Rai & (United Kingdom) Drew Sturrock
25–27	Indoor hockey	(United States) 2021 Men's Indoor Pan American Cup (United States) 2021 Women's Indoor Pan American Cup	Continental	Men: Argentina; Women: United States
25–27	Rhythmic gymnastics	(Guatemala) 2021 Junior Pan American Rhythmic Gymnastics Championships	Continental	United States
25–27	Rugby sevens	(Australia) 2021 Oceania Sevens Championship (Australia) 2021 Oceania Women's Sevens Championship	Continental	Men: Fiji; Women: New Zealand
26	Formula racing	(Austria) 2021 W Series Spielberg round (W Series #1)	International	(United Kingdom) Alice Powell
26–1 July	Water polo	(Georgia (country)) 2020 FINA Men's Water Polo World League Super Final	International	Montenegro
26–18 July	Road bicycle racing	2021 Tour de France (Grand Tour #2)	International	(Slovenia) Tadej Pogačar ( (United Arab Emirates) UAE Team Emirates)
27	Formula racing	(Austria) 2021 Styrian Grand Prix (F1 #8)	International	(Netherlands) Max Verstappen ( (Austria) Red Bull Racing-Honda)
27	Motorcycle racing	(Netherlands) 2021 Dutch TT (MotoGP #9)	International	MotoGP: (France) Fabio Quartararo ( (Japan) Monster Energy Yamaha MotoGP); Moto2: (Spain) Raúl Fernández ( (Finland) Red Bull KTM Ajo); Moto3: (Italy) Dennis Foggia ( (Luxembourg) Leopard Racing); MotoE: (Brazil) Eric Granado ( (Malaysia) One Energy Racing)
27	Golf	(United States) Senior Players Championship	International	(United States) Steve Stricker
28–11 July	Tennis	(United Kingdom) 2021 Wimbledon Championships (Grand Slam #3)^{†}	International	Men: (Serbia) Novak Djokovic; Women: (Australia) Ashleigh Barty
28–14 July	International draughts	(Estonia) 2021 Women's World Draughts Championship	International	(Russia) Matrena Nogovitsyna
29–5 July	Aeromodelling	(United States) 2021 FAI F3D-F3E World Championships for Pylon Racing Model Aircraft	International	Postponed to 8–14 July 2022
29–14 July	International draughts	(Estonia) 2021 World Draughts Championship	International	(Russia) Alexander Schwarzman
30–4 July	Volleyball	(Portugal) 2021 FIVB Volleyball Men's Challenger Cup (Croatia) 2021 FIVB Volleyball Women's Challenger Cup	International	Cancelled
30–9 July	Association football	(Tajikistan) 2021 CAFA U-17 Women's Championship	Regional	Uzbekistan
30–13 July	Association football	(Romania) 2021 UEFA European Under-19 Championship	Continental	Cancelled
June–July	Association football	(Peru) 2021 FIFA U-17 World Cup	International	Cancelled

=== July ===
Date	Sport	Venue/Event	Status	Winner/s
1–12	Amateur boxing	(Georgia (country)) 2021 Junior European Boxing Championships	Continental	Russia
2–4	Acrobatic gymnastics	(Switzerland) 2020 Acrobatic Gymnastics World Championships	International	Russian Gymnastics Federation
2–11	Road bicycle racing	(Italy) 2021 Giro Rosa	International	(Netherlands) Anna van der Breggen ( (Netherlands) SD Worx)
3	Mountain running	(Portugal) 2021 European Mountain Running Championships	Continental	Cancelled
3–4	Judo	(Poland) 2021 European Kata Judo Championships (Poland) 2021 European Kata Judo Junior Championships	Continental	Senior: Italy; Junior: Russia
3–4	Formula racing	(Austria) 2021 Spielberg Formula 3 round (F3 #3)	International	Race 1: (Norway) Dennis Hauger ( (Italy) Prema Racing); Race 2: (Germany) David Schumacher ( (Italy) Trident); Race 3: (Denmark) Frederik Vesti ( (France) ART Grand Prix)
3–9	Orienteering	(Czech Republic) 2021 World Orienteering Championships	International	Sweden
3–11	Basketball	(Latvia) 2021 FIBA Under-19 Basketball World Cup	International	United States
4	Formula racing	(Austria) 2021 Austrian Grand Prix (F1 #9)	International	(Netherlands) Max Verstappen ( (Austria) Red Bull Racing-Honda)
4–6	Surf ski	(Spain) 2021 ICF Canoe Ocean Racing World Championships	International	Men: (South Africa) Nicolas Notten; Women: (South Africa) Michelle Burn
5–8	Finswimming	(Russia) 2021 Finswimming World Championships	International	Russian Underwater Federation
5–11	Modern pentathlon	(Russia) 2021 European Modern Pentathlon Championships	Continental	Hungary
6–11	Canoe slalom	(Slovenia) 2021 World Junior and U23 Canoe Slalom Championships	International	Czech Republic
6–11	Swimming	(Italy) 2021 European Junior Swimming Championships	Continental	Russia
6–17	Paragliding	(Italy) 3rd FAI World Paragliding Aerobatic Championship	International	Spain
7–11	Rowing	(Czech Republic) 2021 World Rowing U23 Championships	International	Italy
7–18	Association football	(South Africa) 2021 COSAFA Cup	Regional	South Africa
7–1 August	Association football	(England) UEFA Women's Euro 2021	Continental	Postponed to 6–31 July 2022
8–11	Athletics	(Estonia) 2021 European Athletics U23 Championships	Continental	Italy
8–11	Canoe marathon	(Russia) 2021 Canoe Marathon European Championships	Continental	Hungary
8–18	Handball	(Slovenia) 2021 Women's U-19 European Handball Championship	Continental	Hungary
9–11	BMX racing	(Belgium) 2021 European BMX Championships	Continental	Men: (France) Arthur Pilard; Women: (Switzerland) Zoé Claessens
9–18	Volleyball	(Belgium) / (Netherlands) 2021 FIVB Volleyball Women's U20 World Championship	International	Italy
10	Association football	(Benin) 2021 CAF Confederation Cup Final	Continental	(Morocco) Raja Casablanca
10–11	Formula racing	(United States) 2021 New York City ePrix (FE #10/11)	International	Race 1: (Germany) Maximilian Günther ( (United States) BMW i Andretti Motorsport); Race 2: (United Kingdom) Sam Bird ( (United Kingdom) Jaguar Racing)
10–18	Volleyball	(Hungary) / (Slovakia) 2021 Girls' U16 European Volleyball Championship	Continental	Russia
10–1 August	Association football	(United States) 2021 CONCACAF Gold Cup	Continental	United States
11–18	Modern pentathlon	(Egypt) 2021 Modern Pentathlon Junior World Championships	International	Hungary
11–23	Gliding	(Lithuania) 5th FAI Junior European Gliding Championships	Continental	Club: (United Kingdom) Finn Sleigh; Standard: (Germany) Simon Briel
12–18	Basketball	(Hungary) 2021 FIBA U20 Women's European Championship	Continental	Cancelled
12–18	Beach soccer	(Portugal) 2021 Euro Winners Cup (Portugal) 2021 Women's Euro Winners Cup	Continental	Men: (Russia) Kristall; Women: (Spain) Madrid
12–3 August	Chess	(Russia) Women's Chess World Cup 2021	International	(Russia) Alexandra Kosteniuk
12–6 August	Chess	(Russia) Chess World Cup 2021	International	(Poland) Jan-Krzysztof Duda
13	Baseball	(United States) 2021 Major League Baseball All-Star Game	Domestic	American League
13–18	Beach handball	(Bulgaria) 2021 European Beach Handball Championship	Continental	Men: Denmark; Women: Germany
14–22	Squash	(United States) 2020–21 PSA Men's World Squash Championship (United States) 2020–21 PSA Women's World Squash Championship	International	Men: (Egypt) Ali Farag; Women: (Egypt) Nour El Sherbini
14–24	Aerobatics	(Czech Republic) 14th FAI World Advanced Aerobatic Championships	International	Cancelled
14–25	Futsal	(United Arab Emirates) 2021 AFC Futsal Club Championship	Continental	Cancelled
14–27	Multi-sport	(Serbia) 2020 European Universities Games	Continental	Cancelled
15–18	Athletics	(Estonia) 2021 European Athletics U20 Championships	Continental	Great Britain
15–18	Golf	(England) 2021 Open Championship (Grand Slam #4)^{†}	International	(United States) Collin Morikawa
15–18	Rallying	2021 Rally Estonia (WRC #7)	International	WRC: (Finland) Kalle Rovanperä & (Finland) Jonne Halttunen ( (Japan) Toyota Gazoo Racing WRT); WRC-2: (Norway) Andreas Mikkelsen & (Norway) Ola Fløene ( (Germany) Toksport WRT); WRC-3: Aleksey Lukyanuk & Yaroslav Fedorov; J-WRC: (Finland) Sami Pajari & (Finland) Marko Salminen ( (Finland) Porvoon Autopalvelu)
17	Association football	(Morocco) 2021 CAF Champions League Final	Continental	(Egypt) Al Ahly
17–18	Formula racing	(United Kingdom) 2021 Silverstone Formula 2 round (F2 #4)	International	Sprint race 1: (Russia) Robert Shwartzman ( (Italy) Prema Racing); Sprint race 2: (Netherlands) Richard Verschoor ( (Netherlands) MP Motorsport); Feature race: (China) Guanyu Zhou ( (United Kingdom) UNI-Virtuosi Racing)
17–25	Basketball	(Montenegro) 2021 FIBA U20 European Championship	Continental	Cancelled
17–25	Darts	(England) 2021 World Matchplay	International	Peter Wright
17–31	Association football	(Ethiopia) 2021 CECAFA U-23 Challenge Cup	Regional	Tanzania
18	Endurance racing	(Italy) 2021 6 Hours of Monza (WEC #3)	International	Hypercar: (United Kingdom) Mike Conway, (Japan) Kamui Kobayashi & (Argentina) José María López ( (Japan) Toyota Gazoo Racing); LMP2: (Portugal) Filipe Albuquerque, (United Kingdom) Philip Hanson & (Switzerland) Fabio Scherer ( (United States) United Autosports USA); LMGTE Pro: (France) Kévin Estre & (Switzerland) Neel Jani ( (Germany) Porsche GT Team); LMGTE Am: (Denmark) Nicklas Nielsen, (France) François Perrodo & (Italy) Alessio Rovera ( (Italy) AF Corse)
18	Formula racing	(United Kingdom) 2021 British Grand Prix (F1 #10)	International	(United Kingdom) Lewis Hamilton ( (Germany) Mercedes)
18–25	Inline speed skating	(Portugal) 2021 European Inline Speed Skating Championships	Continental	France
19–30	Hang gliding	(North Macedonia) 23rd FAI World Hang Gliding Class 1 Championship (North Macedonia) 9th FAI World Hang Gliding Class 5 Championship	International	Postponed to 6–19 August 2023
20–25	Basketball	(Cyprus) 2021 FIBA Women's European Championship for Small Countries	Continental	Luxembourg
21–31	Lacrosse	(Poland) 2020 European Lacrosse Championship	Continental	Cancelled
21–2 August	Association football	(Belarus) 2021 UEFA Women's Under-19 Championship	Continental	Cancelled
21–8 August	Multi-sport	(Japan) 2020 Summer Olympics^{†}	International	United States
22–25	Golf	(France) 2021 Evian Championship	International	(Australia) Minjee Lee
23–24	Rallycross	(Spain) 2021 World RX of Barcelona-Catalunya (WRX #1)	International	(Sweden) Kevin Hansen ( (Sweden) Hansen World RX Team)
23–21 May 2022	Association football	(Russia) 2021–22 Russian Premier League	Domestic	(Russia) Zenit Saint Petersburg
23–22 May 2022	Association football	(Belgium) 2021–22 Belgian First Division A	Domestic	(Belgium) Club Brugge
23–29 May 2022	Association football	(Austria) 2021–22 Austrian Football Bundesliga	Domestic	(Austria) Red Bull Salzburg
24–25	Formula racing	(United Kingdom) 2021 London ePrix (FE #12/13)	International	Race 1: (United Kingdom) Jake Dennis ( (United States) BMW i Andretti Motorsport); Race 2: (Netherlands) Robin Frijns ( (United Kingdom) Alex Lynn)
24–1 August	Basketball	(Greece) 2021 FIBA U18 Women's European Championship	Continental	Cancelled
26–31	Parachuting	(Czech Republic) 10th FAI European Freefall Style & Accuracy Landing Parachuting Championship (Czech Republic) 7th FAI Junior European Freefall Style and Accuracy Landing Championships	Continental	Cancelled
28–6 August	Aerobatics	(Poland) 23rd FAI World Glider Aerobatic Championships (Poland) 11th FAI World Advanced Glider Aerobatic Championships	International	Aerobatic: (Hungary) Ferenc Tóth; Advanced Aerobatic: (France) Charlie Levy-Louapre
29–7 August	Aerobatics	(Poland) 14th FAI World Advanced Aerobatic Championships	International	Russia
30–6 August	Aeromodelling	(Romania) 2021 FAI F3CN World Championships for Model Helicopters	International	Cancelled
31–1 August	Formula racing	(Hungary) 2021 Budapest Formula 3 round (F3 #4)	International	Race 1: (Japan) Ayumu Iwasa ( (United Kingdom) Hitech Grand Prix); Race 2: (Italy) Matteo Nannini ( (Germany) HWA Racelab); Race 3: (Norway) Dennis Hauger ( (Italy) Prema Racing)
31–8 August	Basketball	(Turkey) 2021 FIBA U18 European Championship	Continental	Cancelled

=== August ===
Date	Sport	Venue/Event	Status	Winner/s
1	Formula racing	(Hungary) 2021 Hungarian Grand Prix (F1 #11)	International	(France) Esteban Ocon ( (France) Alpine-Renault)
1–7	Multi-sport	(Trinidad and Tobago) 2021 Commonwealth Youth Games	International	Postponed to 4–11 August 2023
1–7	Aeromodelling	(Denmark) 2021 FAI F3B World Championship for Model Gliders	International	Cancelled
5–8	Multi-sport	(Canada) 2021 Masters Indigenous Games	International	Postponed to 17–23 August 2023
5–8	Golf	(United States) 2021 WGC-FedEx St. Jude Invitational (WGC #3)	International	(Mexico) Abraham Ancer
5–15	Handball	(Montenegro) 2021 European Women's U-17 Handball Championship	Continental	Hungary
6–14	Basketball	(Portugal) 2021 FIBA U16 Women's European Championship	Continental	Cancelled
6–15	Athletics	(United States) 2021 World Athletics Championships	International	Postponed to 15–24 July 2022
6–15	Basketball	(Egypt) 2021 FIBA Under-16 African Championship	Continental	Egypt
6–15 May 2022	Association football	(Portugal) 2021–22 Primeira Liga	Domestic	(Portugal) Porto
6–21 May 2022	Association football	(France) 2021–22 Ligue 1	Domestic	(France) Paris Saint-Germain
7–15	Basketball	(Egypt) 2021 FIBA U16 Women's African Championship	Continental	Mali
7–15	Basketball	(Hungary) 2021 FIBA Under-19 Women's Basketball World Cup	International	United States
7–15	Sailing	(United States) 2020 J/70 World Championship^{†}	International	(United States) Peter Duncan
7–21	Gliding	(France) 36th FAI World Gliding Championships	International	Club: (Germany) Uwe Wahlig; Standard: (Germany) Simon Schröder; 15 Metre: (Poland) Sebastian Kawa
8	Motorcycle racing	(Styria) 2021 Styrian motorcycle Grand Prix (MotoGP #10)	International	MotoGP: (Spain) Jorge Martín ( (Italy) Pramac Racing); Moto2: (Italy) Marco Bezzecchi ( (Italy) Sky Racing Team VR46); Moto3: (Spain) Pedro Acosta ( (Finland) Red Bull KTM Ajo)
8–15	Tennis	(Canada) 2021 Canadian Open	International	Men: (Russia) Daniil Medvedev; Women: (Italy) Camila Giorgi
9–14	Sailing	(United States) 2021 Youth Match Racing World Championship	International	(United States) David Wood
9–15	Archery	(Poland) 2021 World Archery Youth Championships	International	India
9–21	Parachuting	(Russia) 2020 FAI World Parachuting Championships^{†}	International	Russian Parachuting Federation
10–15	Basketball	(Republic of Ireland) 2020 FIBA European Championship for Small Countries^{†}	Continental	Ireland
11	Association football	(Northern Ireland) 2021 UEFA Super Cup	Continental	(England) Chelsea
11–15	Beach volleyball	(Austria) 2021 European Beach Volleyball Championships	Continental	Men: (Norway) Anders Mol / Christian Sørum; Women: (Switzerland) Nina Betschart / Tanja Hüberli
11–15	Rowing	(Bulgaria) 2021 World Rowing Junior Championships	International	United States
12–15	Taekwondo	(Bulgaria) 2021 World Taekwondo Cadet Championships	International	Cancelled
12–16	Fishing	(Finland) 2021 World Fly Fishing Championship	International	Individual: (Finland) Heikki Kurtti; Team: Finland
12–22	Handball	(Croatia) 2021 European Men's U-19 Handball Championship	Continental	Germany
13–15	Open water swimming	(Seychelles) 2021 FINA World Junior Open Water Swimming Championships	International	Postponed to 16–18 September 2022
13–15	Rallying	(Belgium) 2021 Ypres Rally (WRC #8)	International	WRC: (Belgium) Thierry Neuville & (Belgium) Martijn Wydaeghe ( (South Korea) Hyundai Shell Mobis WRT); WRC-2: (Finland) Jari Huttunen & (Finland) Mikko Lukka ( (South Korea) Hyundai Motorsport N); WRC-3: (France) Yohan Rossel & (France) Alexandre Coria; J-WRC: (United Kingdom) Jon Armstrong & (United Kingdom) Phil Hall
13–21	Basketball	(North Macedonia) 2021 FIBA U16 European Championship	Continental	Cancelled
13–22	Baseball	(Taiwan) 2021 U-12 Baseball World Cup	International	Postponed to 28 July–7 August 2022
13–14 May 2022	Association football	(Germany) 2021–22 Bundesliga	Domestic	(Germany) Bayern Munich
13–15 May 2022	Association football	(Netherlands) 2021–22 Eredivisie	Domestic	(Netherlands) Ajax
13–22 May 2022	Association football	(Spain) 2021–22 La Liga	Domestic	(Spain) Real Madrid
13–22 May 2022	Association football	(England) 2021–22 Premier League	Domestic	(England) Manchester City
14–15	Fishing	(France) 2021 Feeder Fishing World Championship	International	Individual: (Belgium) Benny Mertens; Team: Belgium
14–15	Formula racing	(Germany) 2021 Berlin ePrix (FE #14/15)	International	Race 1: (Brazil) Lucas di Grassi ( (Germany) Audi Sport ABT Schaeffler Formula E Team); Race 2: (France) Norman Nato ( (Monaco) ROKiT Venturi Racing)
14–21	Sailing	(Finland) 2021 12 Metre World Championship	International	(Denmark) Patrick Howaldt
14–5 September	Road bicycle racing	(Spain) 2021 Vuelta a España (Grand Tour #3)	International	(Slovenia) Primož Roglič ( (Netherlands) Team Jumbo–Visma)
14–2 October	Rugby union	(Argentina) / (Australia) / (New Zealand) / (South Africa) 2021 Rugby Championship	International	New Zealand
15	Motorcycle racing	(Austria) 2021 Austrian motorcycle Grand Prix (MotoGP #11)	International	MotoGP: (South Africa) Brad Binder ( (Austria) Red Bull KTM Factory Racing); Moto2: (Spain) Raúl Fernández ( (Finland) Red Bull KTM Ajo); Moto3: (Spain) Sergio García ( (Spain) Santander Consumer GasGas); MotoE: (Germany) Lukas Tulovic ( (France) Tech3 E-Racing)
16–21	Sailing	(Latvia) 2021 Raceboard World Championships	International	Men: (Lithuania) Juozas Bernotas; Women: (Latvia) Vita Matīse
16–22	Sailing	(Switzerland) 2021 iQFoil World Championships	International	Men: (France) Nicolas Goyard; Women: (France) Hélène Noesmoen
16–22	Tennis	(United States) 2021 Cincinnati Masters	International	Men: (Germany) Alexander Zverev; Women: (Australia) Ashleigh Barty
16–22	Wrestling	(Russia) 2021 World Junior Wrestling Championships	International	Russia
17–19	Judo	(Latvia) 2021 European Cadet Judo Championships	Continental	Russia
17–22	Track cycling	(Netherlands) 2021 UEC European Track Championships (under-23 & junior)	Continental	Russia
17–29	Basketball	(Indonesia) 2021 FIBA Asia Cup	Continental	Postponed to 12–24 July 2022
18–22	Athletics	(Kenya) 2021 World Athletics U20 Championships	International	Kenya
18–23	Volleyball	(Mexico) 2021 Men's NORCECA Volleyball Championship	Continental	Puerto Rico
18–29	Handball	(Greece) 2021 Men's Youth World Handball Championship	International	Cancelled
18–29	Multi-sport	(China) 2021 Summer World University Games	International	Postponed to 28 July–8 August 2023
18–4 September	Volleyball	(Serbia) / (Bulgaria) / (Croatia) / (Romania) 2021 Women's European Volleyball Championship	Continental	Italy
19–22	Canoe slalom	(Slovenia) 2021 European Junior and U23 Canoe Slalom Championships	Continental	Czech Republic
19–22	Golf	(Scotland) 2021 Women's British Open	International	(Sweden) Anna Nordqvist
19–22	Orienteering	(Lithuania) 2021 European Youth Orienteering Championships	Continental	Finland
19–29	Baseball	(United States) 2021 Little League World Series	Domestic	(Michigan) Taylor North Little League
19–29	Beach soccer	(Russia) 2021 FIFA Beach Soccer World Cup	International	RFU
19–5 September	Golf	(United States) 2021 FedEx Cup Playoffs	International	The Northern Trust: (United States) Tony Finau; BMW Championship: (United States) Patrick Cantlay; Tour Championship: (United States) Patrick Cantlay
20–22	BMX racing	(Netherlands) 2021 UCI BMX World Championships	International	Men: (Netherlands) Niek Kimmann; Women: (United Kingdom) Beth Shriever
20–22	Karate	(Finland) 2021 European Cadet, Junior & U21 Karate Championships	Continental	Turkey
20–22	Rallycross	2021 World RX of Sweden (WRX #2)	International	(Sweden) Timmy Hansen ( (Sweden) Hansen World RX Team)
20–28	Aerobatics	(Czech Republic) 22nd FAI European Aerobatic Championships	Continental	Cancelled
20–31	Ice hockey	(Canada) 2021 IIHF Women's World Championship	International	Canada
21–22	Endurance racing	(France) 2021 24 Hours of Le Mans (WEC #4)	International	Hypercar: (United Kingdom) Mike Conway, (Japan) Kamui Kobayashi & (Argentina) José María López ( (Japan) Toyota Gazoo Racing); LMP2: (Netherlands) Robin Frijns, (Austria) Ferdinand von Habsburg & (France) Charles Milesi ( (Belgium) Team WRT); LMGTE Pro: (United Kingdom) James Calado, (France) Côme Ledogar & (Italy) Alessandro Pier Guidi ( (Italy) AF Corse); LMGTE Am: (Denmark) Nicklas Nielsen, (France) François Perrodo & (Italy) Alessio Rovera ( (Italy) AF Corse)
21–28	Field hockey	(Chile) 2021 Men's Junior Pan American Championship (Chile) 2021 Women's Junior Pan American Championship	Continental	Men: Chile; Women: Canada
21–28	Fishing	(Italy) 2021 Long Casting of Sea Weights World Championships	International	Argentina
21–29	Artistic swimming	(Canada) 2021 FINA World Junior & Youth Artistic Swimming Championships	International	Postponed to 10–14 August 2022
21–29	Water Polo	(Croatia) 2021 LEN Women European Junior Water Polo Championship	Continental	Russia
21–31	Sport climbing	(Russia) 2021 IFSC Climbing World Youth Championship	International	Japan
21–22 May 2022	Association football	(Italy) 2021–22 Serie A	Domestic	(Italy) AC Milan
22–25	Handball	(United States) 2021 Nor.Ca. Women's Handball Championship	Regional	Puerto Rico
22–28	Sailing	(Lithuania) 2021 Platu 25 World Championship	International	(Estonia) Mati Sepp
23–29	Basketball	(Mexico) 2021 FIBA Under-16 Americas Championship	Continental	United States
23–29	Basketball	(Mexico) 2021 FIBA Under-16 Women's Americas Championship	Continental	United States
23–29	Equestrian	(Hungary) 2021 FEI World Vaulting Championships	International	Germany
24–29	Basketball	(Hungary) 2021 FIBA 3x3 U18 World Cup	International	Men: United States; Women: United States
24–2 September	Volleyball	(Iran) 2021 FIVB Volleyball Boys' U19 World Championship	International	Poland
24–5 September	Basketball	(Rwanda) AfroBasket 2021	Continental	Tunisia
24–5 September	Olympics	(Japan) 2020 Summer Paralympics^{†}	International	China
24–6 September	Association football	(Egypt) 2021 Arab Women's Cup	International	Jordan
25–28	Karate	(United States) 2021 Pan American Cadet, Junior and U21 Karate Championships	Continental	Postponed to 25–27 August 2022
25–29	Biathle & Triathle	(Germany) 2021 Biathle/Triathle World Championships	International	Czech Republic
25–29	Floorball	(Czech Republic) 2021 Men's under-19 World Floorball Championships	International	Czech Republic
25–29	Mountain bike racing	(Italy) 2021 UCI Mountain Bike World Championships	International	France
26–29	Athletics	(Italy) 2021 European Athletics U18 Championships	Continental	Cancelled
26–29	Summer biathlon	(Czech Republic) Summer Biathlon World Championships 2021	International	Czech Republic
27–30	Beach sambo	(Cyprus) 2021 World Beach Sambo Championships	International	Russian Sambo Federation
28–29	Fishing	(Bulgaria) 2021 Carnivorous Artificial Bait Shore Angling World Championship for Nations	International	Individual: (Ukraine) Nazariy Bozhenko; Team: Ukraine
28–29	Formula racing	(Belgium) 2021 Spa-Francorchamps FIA Formula 3 round (F3 #5)	International	Race 1: (Italy) Lorenzo Colombo ( (Spain) Campos Racing); Race 2: (Australia) Jack Doohan ( (Italy) Trident); Race 3: (Australia) Jack Doohan ( (Italy) Trident)
28–29	Off-road racing	(Greenland) 2021 Arctic X-Prix (Extreme E #3)	International	(Sweden) Johan Kristoffersson & (Australia) Molly Taylor ( (United States) Andretti United XE)
28–5 September	Water polo	(Czech Republic) 2021 FINA World Men's Junior Water Polo Championships	International	Serbia
29	Formula racing	(Belgium) 2021 Belgian Grand Prix (F1 #12)	International	(Netherlands) Max Verstappen ( (Austria) Red Bull Racing-Honda)
29	Motorcycle racing	(United Kingdom) 2021 British motorcycle Grand Prix (MotoGP #12)	International	MotoGP: (France) Fabio Quartararo ( (Japan) Monster Energy Yamaha MotoGP); Moto2: (Australia) Remy Gardner ( (Finland) Red Bull KTM Ajo); Moto3: (Italy) Romano Fenati ( (Italy) Sterilgarda Max Racing Team)
30–4 September	Archery	(Slovenia) 2021 European 3D Championships	Continental	Italy
30–12 September	Tennis	(United States) 2021 US Open (Grand Slam #4)	International	Men: (Russia) Daniil Medvedev; Women: (United Kingdom) Emma Raducanu
31–7 September	Sailing	(Italy) 2021 Moth World Championship	International	(Australia) Tom Slingsby

=== September ===
Date	Sport	Venue/Event	Status	Winner/s
1–4	Sailing	(Italy) 2021 Melges 32 World Championships	International	(Germany) Christian Schwörer
1–5	Casting	(Hungary) 2021 Casting Sport World Championships	International	Czech Republic
1–5	Floorball	(Sweden) 2020 Women's under-19 World Floorball Championships^{†}	International	Finland
1–5	Sailing	(Greece) 2021 IFCA Slalom World Championships	International	Men: (Croatia) Enrico Marotti; Women: (United Kingdom) Jenna Gibson
1–5	Track cycling	(Egypt) 2021 UCI Junior Track Cycling World Championships	International	Russia
1–5	Volleyball	(Brazil) 2021 Men's South American Volleyball Championship	Continental	Brazil
1–7	Table tennis	(Cameroon) 2021 African Table Tennis Championships	Continental	Men: (Egypt) Omar Assar; Women: (Egypt) Mariam Alhodaby
1–19	Volleyball	(Poland) / (Czech Republic) / (Estonia) / (Finland) 2021 Men's European Volleyball Championship	Continental	Italy
2–5	Mountain bike trials	(Spain) 2021 UCI Trials World Championships	International	Spain
3–5	Rallycross	2021 World RX of France (WRX #3)	International	(Sweden) Timmy Hansen ( (Sweden) Hansen World RX Team)
3–5	Triathlon	(Kazakhstan) 2021 Asian U23 and Junior Triathlon Championships	Continental	Cancelled
3–8	Sailing	(Germany) 2021 FarEast 28R World Championships	International	Cancelled
3–11	Artistic roller skating	(Italy) 2021 European Artistic Roller Skating Championships	Continental	Italy
3–12	Badminton	(Slovenia) 2021 European U17 Badminton Championships	Continental	Russia
4–5	Formula racing	(Netherlands) 2021 Zandvoort FIA Formula 3 round (F3 #6)	International	Race 1: (Monaco) Arthur Leclerc ( (Italy) Prema Racing); Race 2: (France) Victor Martins ( (Netherlands) MP Motorsport); Race 3: (Norway) Dennis Hauger ( (Italy) Prema Racing)
4–5	Rowing	(Poland) 2021 European Rowing U23 Championships	Continental	Romania
4–5	Triathlon	(Kazakhstan) 2021 Asian Mixed Relay Triathlon Championships	Continental	Cancelled
4–6	Golf	(United States) 2021 Solheim Cup	International	Europe
4–10	Aerobatics	(Belgium) 1st FAI European Intermediate Aerobatic Championship	Continental	(Russia) Ivan Barsov
4–11	Multi-sport	(Russia) 2021 CIS Games	Regional	Russia
4–11	Sailing	(Spain) 2021 Flying Dutchman World Championships	International	Hungary
4–11 December	American football	(United States) 2021 NCAA Division I FBS football season	Domestic	(Georgia (U.S. state)) Georgia Bulldogs
5	Mountain bike racing	(Austria) 2021 UCI Mountain Bike Eliminator World Championships	International	Men: (Germany) Simon Gegenheimer; Women: (Italy) Gaia Tormena
5	Formula racing	(Netherlands) 2021 Dutch Grand Prix (F1 #13)^{†}	International	(Netherlands) Max Verstappen ( (Austria) Red Bull Racing-Honda)
5–10	Orienteering	(Turkey) 2021 Junior World Orienteering Championships	International	Men: (Italy) Francesco Mariani; Women: (Denmark) Malin Agervig Kristiansson
5–11	Gliding	(France) 2021 FAI World Sailplane Grand Prix Championship	International	(Poland) Sebastian Kawa
5–12	Archery	(Croatia) 2021 European Field Championships	Continental	Italy
6–10	Pool	(United States) 2021 World Ten-ball Championship	International	(Albania) Eklent Kaçi
7–12	Artistic swimming	(Croatia) 2021 European Youth Artistic Swimming Championships	Continental	Russia
7–12	Dressage	(Germany) 2021 European Dressage Championships	Continental	Germany
7–15	Volleyball	(Rwanda) 2021 Men's African Nations Volleyball Championship	Continental	Tunisia
7–19	Bowls	(Australia) 2020 World Outdoor Bowls Championship	International	Cancelled
8–12	Road bicycle racing	(Italy) 2021 European Road Championships	Continental	Italy
8–19	Inline hockey	(Italy) 2021 InLine Hockey World Championships	International	Men: Czech Republic; Women: France
9–12	Standup paddleboarding	(Hungary) 2021 ICF SUP World Championships	International	Spain
9–12	Darts	(Germany) 2021 PDC World Cup of Darts	International	Scotland
9–12	Judo	(Luxembourg) 2021 European Junior Judo Championships	Continental	France
9–12	Rallying	(Greece) 2021 Acropolis Rally (WRC #9)	International	WRC: (Finland) Kalle Rovanperä & (Finland) Jonne Halttunen ( (Japan) Toyota Gazoo Racing WRT); WRC-2: (Norway) Andreas Mikkelsen & (United Kingdom) Elliott Edmondson ( (Germany) Toksport WRT); WRC-3: (Poland) Kajetan Kajetanowicz & (Poland) Maciej Szczepaniak
9–9 January 2022	American football	(United States) 2021 NFL season	Domestic	(Wisconsin) Green Bay Packers
10–12	3x3 basketball	(France) 2021 FIBA 3x3 Europe Cup	International	Men: Serbia; Women: Spain
10–12	Cable skiing	(Poland) 2021 IWWF Cableski World Championships	International	Belarus
10–19	Baseball	(United States) 2021 U-18 Baseball World Cup	International	Postponed to 9–18 September 2022
10–19	Multi-sport	(Turkey) 2021 Islamic Solidarity Games	International	Postponed to 9–22 August 2022
11–12	Formula racing	(Italy) 2021 Monza Formula 2 round (F2 #5)	International	Sprint race 1: (France) Théo Pourchaire ( (France) ART Grand Prix); Sprint race 2: (India) Jehan Daruvala ( (United Kingdom) Carlin); Feature race: (Australia) Oscar Piastri ( (Italy) Prema Racing)
11–20	Volleyball	(Dominican Republic) 2021 Women's Pan-American Volleyball Cup	Continental	Dominican Republic
12	Formula racing	(Italy) 2021 Italian Grand Prix (F1 #14)	International	(Australia) Daniel Ricciardo ( (United Kingdom) McLaren-Mercedes)
12	Motorcycle racing	2021 Aragon motorcycle Grand Prix (MotoGP #13)	International	MotoGP: (Italy) Francesco Bagnaia ( (Italy) Ducati Lenovo Team); Moto2: (Spain) Raúl Fernández ( (Finland) Red Bull KTM Ajo); Moto3: (Italy) Dennis Foggia ( (Luxembourg) Leopard Racing)
12–19	Baseball	(Italy) 2021 European Baseball Championship	Continental	Netherlands
12–19	Volleyball	(Japan) 2021 Asian Men's Volleyball Championship	Continental	Iran
12–19	Modern pentathlon	(Egypt) 2021 Modern Pentathlon Youth World Championships	International	Russia
12–19	Volleyball	(Rwanda) 2021 Women's African Nations Volleyball Championship	Continental	Cameroon
12–19	Water polo	(Malta) 2021 LEN Men's European Junior Water Polo Championships	Continental	Serbia
12–3 October	Futsal	(Lithuania) 2021 FIFA Futsal World Cup	International	Portugal
13–18	Ballooning	(Hungary) 22nd FAI European Hot Air Balloon Championship	Continental	France
13–19	Beach tennis	(Italy) 2021 ITF Beach Tennis World Championships	International	Men: (Russia) Nikita Burmakin and (Italy) Tommaso Giovannini; Women: (Italy) Giulia Gasparri and (Italy) Ninny Valentini
14	Surfing	(United States) 2021 World Surf League Finals	International	Men: (Brazil) Gabriel Medina; Women: (Hawaii) Carissa Moore
14–18	Athletics	(Chile) 2021 Pan American U20 Athletics Championships	Continental	Cancelled
15–17	Sport climbing	(Russia) 2021 IFSC Paraclimbing World Championships	International	France
15–19	Volleyball	(Colombia) 2021 Women's South American Volleyball Championship	Continental	Brazil
15–21	Sport climbing	(Russia) 2021 IFSC Climbing World Championships	International	Japan
15–25	Handball	(Jordan) 2021 Asian Women's Handball Championship	Continental	South Korea
16–19	Canoe sprint	(Denmark) 2021 ICF Canoe Sprint World Championships	International	Canoe sprint: Hungary; Paracanoe: Great Britain
17	Ironman triathlon	(United States) 2021 Ironman 70.3 World Championship	International	Men: (Norway) Gustav Iden; Women: (United Kingdom) Lucy Charles-Barclay
17–18	Triathlon	(Kyrgyzstan) 2021 Asian Sprint Triathlon Championships	Continental	Kazakhstan
17–19	Aerobic gymnastics	(Italy) 2021 Aerobic Gymnastics European Championships	Continental	Bulgaria
17–26	Basketball	(Cameroon) 2021 Women's Afrobasket	Continental	Nigeria
18–19	Motorcycle racing	2021 San Marino and Rimini Riviera motorcycle Grand Prix (MotoGP #14)	International	MotoGP: (Italy) Francesco Bagnaia ( (Italy) Ducati Lenovo Team); Moto2: (Spain) Raúl Fernández ( (Finland) Red Bull KTM Ajo); Moto3: (Italy) Dennis Foggia ( (Luxembourg) Leopard Racing); MotoE (race 1): (Spain) Jordi Torres ( (Spain) HP Pons 40); MotoE (race 2): (Italy) Matteo Ferrari ( (Italy) Indonesian E-Racing Gresini MotoE)
18–19	Rallycross	2021 World RX of Riga - Latvia (WRX #4/5)	International	(Finland) Niclas Grönholm ( (Finland) GRX-SET World RX Team)
18–19	Table tennis	(Greece) 2021 Europe Top 16 Cup	Continental	Men: (Germany) Patrick Franziska; Women: (Germany) Nina Mittelham
18–26	Rugby sevens	(Canada) 2021 World Rugby Sevens Series	International	South Africa
18–16 October	Rugby union	(New Zealand) 2021 Rugby World Cup	International	Postponed to 8 October–12 November 2022
19–26	Road bicycle racing	(Belgium) 2021 UCI Road World Championships	International	Italy
20–26	Archery	(United States) 2021 World Archery Championships	International	South Korea
20–29	Volleyball	(Mexico) 2021 FIVB Volleyball Girls' U18 World Championship	International	Russia
20–30	Shooting	(France) 2021 World Running Target Championships	International	Postponed to 2–9 August 2022
22–26	Canoe slalom	(Slovakia) 2021 ICF Canoe Slalom World Championships	International	France
22–26	Wildwater canoeing	(Slovakia) 2021 Wildwater Canoeing World Championships	International	France
22–27	Open-water diving	(Colombia) 2021 Open Water World Finswimming Championships	International	Junior: Egypt; Senior: France
23–3 October	Volleyball	(Italy) / (Bulgaria) 2021 FIVB Volleyball Men's U21 World Championship	International	Italy
24–26	Formula racing	(Russia) 2021 Sochi Formula 3 round (F3 #7)	International	Race 1: (United States) Logan Sargeant ( (Czech Republic) Charouz Racing System); Race 2: Cancelled; Race 3: (Australia) Jack Doohan ( (Italy) Trident)
24–26	Golf	(United States) 2021 Ryder Cup^{†}	International	United States
24–26	Tennis	(United States) 2021 Laver Cup^{†}	International	Europe
24–3 October	Baseball	(Mexico) 2021 U-23 Baseball World Cup	International	Venezuela
24–3 October	Weightlifting	(Finland) 2021 European Junior & U23 Weightlifting Championships	Continental	Russia
25	Professional boxing	(United Kingdom) Anthony Joshua vs. Oleksandr Usyk	International	(Ukraine) Oleksandr Usyk
25–26	Formula racing	(Russia) 2021 Sochi Formula 2 round (F2 #6)	International	Sprint race 1: (United Kingdom) Dan Ticktum ( (United Kingdom) Carlin); Sprint race 2: Cancelled; Feature race: (Australia) Oscar Piastri ( (Italy) Prema Racing)
25–26	Triathlon	(Spain) 2021 European Triathlon Championships	Continental	Men: (France) Dorian Coninx; Women: (Switzerland) Julie Derron
26	Endurance racing	(Japan) 2021 6 Hours of Fuji (WEC #5)	International	Cancelled
26	Formula racing	(Russia) 2021 Russian Grand Prix (F1 #15)	International	(United Kingdom) Lewis Hamilton ( (Germany) Mercedes)
26	Marathon	(Germany) 2021 Berlin Marathon (WMM #1)^{†}	International	Men: (Ethiopia) Guye Adola; Women: (Ethiopia) Gotytom Gebreslase
26–3 October	Badminton	(Finland) 2021 Sudirman Cup	International	China
27–10 October	Shooting	(Peru) 2021 ISSF Junior World Championships	International	India
28–3 October	Table tennis	(Romania) 2021 European Table Tennis Championships	Continental	Men: Germany; Women: Germany
28–3 October	Track cycling	(Kazakhstan) 2021 Asian Track Cycling Championships	Continental	Cancelled
28–5 October	Table tennis	(Qatar) 2021 Asian Table Tennis Championships	Continental	Japan
28–9 October	Association football	(South Africa) 2021 COSAFA Women's Championship	Regional	Tanzania
29–3 October	Acrobatic gymnastics	(Italy) 2021 Acrobatic Gymnastics European Championships	Continental	Senior: Russian Acrobatic Gymnastics Federation; Junior: Russian Acrobatic Gymnastics Federation
30–3 October	Canoe marathon	(Romania) 2021 ICF Canoe Marathon World Championships	International	Hungary
30–3 October	Triathlon	(Turkey) 2021 European Youth Triathlon Championships	Continental	Italy/Portugal

=== October ===
Date	Sport	Venue/Event	Status	Winner/s
1–3	Rallying	2021 Rally Finland (WRC #10)	International	WRC: (United Kingdom) Elfyn Evans & (United Kingdom) Scott Martin ( (Japan) Toyota Gazoo Racing WRT); WRC-2: (Finland) Teemu Suninen & (Finland) Mikko Markkula ( (Italy) Movisport); WRC-3: (Finland) Emil Lindholm & (Finland) Reeta Hämäläinen
1–4	Athletics	(Kuwait) 2021 Asian Youth Athletics Championships	Continental	Postponed to 1–4 March 2022
1–16	Association football	(Maldives) 2021 SAFF Championship	Regional	India
2	Mountain bike racing	(Italy) 2021 UCI Mountain Bike Marathon World Championships	International	Men: (Germany) Andreas Seewald; Women: (Austria) Mona Mitterwallner
2	Ultramarathon	(Romania) 2021 IAU 24 Hour World Championship	International	Cancelled
2–8	Air sports	(Romania) 2021 FAI S World Championships for Space Models	International	Poland
2–10	Wrestling	(Norway) 2021 World Wrestling Championships	International	Men's Greco-Roman: Russia; Men's freestyle: Russia; Women's freestyle: Japan
3	Horse racing	(France) 2021 Prix de l'Arc de Triomphe	International	Horse: (Germany) Torquator Tasso; Jockey: (Germany) René Piechulek; Trainer: (Germany) Marcel Weiß
3	Marathon	(United Kingdom) 2021 London Marathon (WMM #2)	International	Men: (Ethiopia) Sisay Lemma; Women: (Kenya) Joyciline Jepkosgei
3	Motorcycle racing	(United States) 2021 Motorcycle Grand Prix of the Americas (MotoGP #15)	International	MotoGP: (Spain) Marc Márquez ( (Japan) Repsol Honda Team); Moto2: (Spain) Raúl Fernández ( (Finland) Red Bull KTM Ajo); Moto3: (Spain) Izan Guevara ( (Spain) Solunion GasGas Aspar Team)
3	Road bicycle racing	(France) 2021 Paris–Roubaix (Monument #4)	International	(Italy) Sonny Colbrelli ( Team Bahrain Victorious)
3–9	Darts	(England) 2021 World Grand Prix	International	Jonny Clayton
4–9	Handball	(Saudi Arabia) 2021 IHF Men's Super Globe	International	(Germany) SC Magdeburg
4–12	Association football	(Saudi Arabia) 2021 WAFF U-23 Championship	Regional	Jordan
4–16	Multi-sport	(United States) 2021 Huntsman World Senior Games	International	Utah
4–17	Tennis	(United States) 2021 Indian Wells Masters^{†}	International	Men: (United Kingdom) Cameron Norrie; Women: (Spain) Paula Badosa
5–9	Handball	(Paraguay) 2021 South and Central American Women's Handball Championship	Continental	Brazil
5–9	Track cycling	(Switzerland) 2021 UEC European Track Championships	Continental	Netherlands
5–12	Weightlifting	(Saudi Arabia) 2021 Youth World Weightlifting Championships	International	Russia
6–10	Association football	(Italy) 2021 UEFA Nations League Finals	Continental	France
6–10	Judo	(Italy) 2021 World Judo Juniors Championships	International	Georgia
6–10	Beach volleyball	(Italy) 2021 FIVB Beach Volleyball World Tour Finals	International	Men: (Norway) Anders Mol and Christian Sørum; Women: (Germany) Karla Borger and Julia Sude
9	Ironman triathlon	(United States) 2021 Ironman World Championship	International	Postponed to 7 May 2022
9	Road bicycle racing	(Italy) 2021 Il Lombardia (Monument #5)	International	(Slovenia) Tadej Pogačar ( (United Arab Emirates) UAE Team Emirates)
9–16	Water polo	(Israel) 2021 FINA World Women's Junior Water Polo Championships	International	Spain
9–17	Badminton	(Denmark) 2020 Thomas & Uber Cup	International	Thomas Cup: Indonesia; Uber Cup: China
10	Formula racing	(Turkey) 2021 Turkish Grand Prix (F1 #16)	International	(Finland) Valtteri Bottas ( (Germany) Mercedes)
10	Formula racing	(Japan) 2021 Japanese Grand Prix (F1)	International	Cancelled
10	Marathon	(United States) 2021 Chicago Marathon (WMM #3)^{†}	International	Men: (Ethiopia) Seifu Tura; Women: (Kenya) Ruth Chepngetich
11	Marathon	(United States) 2021 Boston Marathon (WMM #4)^{†}	International	Men: (Kenya) Benson Kipruto; Women: (Kenya) Diana Kipyogei
11–17	Badminton	(China) 2021 BWF World Junior Championships	International	Cancelled
11–17	Swimming	(Ghana) 2021 African Swimming Championships	Continental	South Africa
11–17	Tennis	(China) 2021 Shanghai Masters	International	Cancelled
13–17	3x3 basketball	(China) 2021 FISU University 3x3 Basketball World Cup	International	Postponed to 27–29 October 2022
14–17	Darts	(Austria) 2021 European Championship	International	Rob Cross
14–17	Rallying	(Spain) 2021 Rally Catalunya (WRC #11)	International	WRC: (Belgium) Thierry Neuville & (Belgium) Martijn Wydaeghe ( (South Korea) Hyundai Shell Mobis WRT); WRC-2: (France) Eric Camilli & (France) Maxime Vilmot ( (Portugal) Sports & You); WRC-3: (Finland) Emil Lindholm & (Finland) Reeta Hämäläinen; JWRC: (Finland) Sami Pajari & (Finland) Marko Salminen ( (Finland) Porvoon Autopalvelu)
14–19	Fencing	(Bulgaria) 2021 European Fencing Championships	Continental	Postponed to 17–22 June 2022
15–17	Triathlon	(Bermuda) 2021 ITU Sprint Distance Triathlon World Championships (Bermuda) 2021 ITU Triathlon Mixed Relay World Championship	International	Postponed to 23–26 June 2022
15–17	Karate	(New Caledonia) 2021 Oceanian Karate Championships	Continental	New Zealand
15–17	Pump track	(Portugal) 2021 UCI Pump Track World Championships	International	Men: (France) Eddy Clerte; Women: (Belgium) Aiko Gommers
16–17	Speedway	(England) 2021 Speedway of Nations	International	Great Britain
16–17	Triathlon	(Hong Kong) 2021 Asian Youth Triathlon Championships	Continental	Cancelled
16–23	Multi-sport	(China) 2021 Gymnasiade	International	Postponed to 26 November–3 December 2022
17	Marathon	(Japan) 2021 Tokyo Marathon (WMM #5)	International	Postponed to 6 March 2022
17–24	Rowing	(China) 2021 World Rowing Championships	International	Cancelled
17–14 November	T20 cricket	(United Arab Emirates) / (Oman) 2021 ICC Men's T20 World Cup^{†}	International	Australia
18–24	Artistic gymnastics	(Japan) 2021 World Artistic Gymnastics Championships	International	China
19–10 April 2022	Basketball	(United States) / (Canada) 2021–22 NBA season	Domestic	(Arizona) Phoenix Suns
20–24	Track cycling	(France) 2021 UCI Track Cycling World Championships	International	Germany
21–28	Badminton	(Uganda) 2021 African Badminton Championships	Continental	Egypt
23–24	Off-road racing	(Italy) 2021 Island X-Prix (Extreme E #4)	International	(Sweden) Johan Kristoffersson & (Australia) Molly Taylor ( (Germany) Rosberg X Racing)
23–24	Karate	(Cyprus) 2021 Mediterranean Karate Championships	Regional	Egypt
23–27 November	Rugby league	(England) 2021 Rugby League World Cup	International	Postponed to 15 October–19 November 2022
24	Formula racing	2021 United States Grand Prix (F1 #17)^{†}	International	(Netherlands) Max Verstappen ( (Austria) Red Bull Racing-Honda)
24	Motorcycle racing	(Italy) 2021 Emilia Romagna motorcycle Grand Prix (MotoGP #16)	International	MotoGP: (Spain) Marc Márquez ( (Japan) Repsol Honda Team); Moto2: (United Kingdom) Sam Lowes ( (Belgium) Elf Marc VDS Racing Team); Moto3: (Italy) Dennis Foggia ( (Luxembourg) Leopard Racing)
24–30	Volleyball	(Philippines) 2021 Asian Women's Volleyball Championship	Continental	Postponed to 15–22 May 2022
25–8 November	Chess	(Latvia) FIDE Grand Swiss Tournament 2021	International	(France) Alireza Firouzja
26–27	Judo	(Portugal) 2021 World Kata Championships	International	France
26–2 November	Baseball	(United States) 2021 World Series	Domestic	(Georgia (U.S. state)) Atlanta Braves
26–6 November	Amateur boxing	(Serbia) 2021 AIBA World Boxing Championships	International	Cuba
27–31	Rhythmic gymnastics	(Japan) 2021 Rhythmic Gymnastics World Championships	International	Russian Rhythmic Gymnastics Federation
27–7 November	Chess	(Latvia) FIDE Women's Grand Swiss Tournament 2021	International	(China) Lei Tingjie
28	Association football	(Mexico) 2021 CONCACAF Champions League Final	Continental	(Mexico) Monterrey
29–31	Motorsport	(France) 2022 FIA Motorsport Games	International	Postponed to 29–30 October 2022
30	Endurance racing	2021 6 Hours of Bahrain (WEC #5)	International	Hypercar: (United Kingdom) Mike Conway, (Japan) Kamui Kobayashi & (Argentina) José María López ( (Japan) Toyota Gazoo Racing); LMP2: (Netherlands) Robin Frijns, (Austria) Ferdinand von Habsburg & (France) Charles Milesi ( (Belgium) Team WRT); LMGTE Pro: (France) Kévin Estre & (Switzerland) Neel Jani ( (Germany) Porsche GT Team); LMGTE Am: (United States) Ben Keating, (Brazil) Felipe Fraga & (Luxembourg) Dylan Pereira ( (United Kingdom) TF Sport)
31	Athletics	(Chinese Taipei) 2021 IAU 50 km World Championships	International	Cancelled

=== November ===
Date	Sport	Venue/Event	Status	Winner/s
1–6	Tennis	(Czech Republic) 2020–21 Billie Jean King Cup Finals^{†}	International	Russian Tennis Federation
1–7	Tennis	(France) 2021 Paris Masters	International	(Serbia) Novak Djokovic
1–7	Wrestling	(Serbia) 2021 U23 World Wrestling Championships	International	Russia
2	Horse racing	(Australia) 2021 Melbourne Cup	International	Horse: (New Zealand) Verry Elleegant; Jockey: (New Zealand) James McDonald; Trainer: (New Zealand) Chris Waller
2–6	Beach soccer	(United Arab Emirates) 2021 Beach Soccer Intercontinental Cup	International	Russia
2–7	Swimming	(Russia) 2021 European Short Course Swimming Championships	Continental	Russia
3–7	Weightlifting	(Ecuador) 2021 Pan American Weightlifting Championships	Continental	Colombia
3–8	Finswimming	(Egypt) 2021 Finswimming World Cup Golden Final (Pool & Open water)	International	Russian Underwater Federation
3–21	Association football	(Paraguay) / (Uruguay) 2021 Copa Libertadores Femenina	Continental	(Brazil) Corinthians
4–7	Rhythmic gymnastics	(Colombia) 2021 South American Rhythmic Gymnastics Championships	Continental	Brazil
5	Association football	(Bahrain) 2021 AFC Cup Final	Continental	(Bahrain) Al-Muharraq
5–7	Judo	(Hungary) 2021 European U23 Judo Championships	Continental	Georgia
6	Endurance racing	2021 8 Hours of Bahrain (WEC #6)	International	Hypercar: (Switzerland) Sébastien Buemi, (New Zealand) Brendon Hartley & (Japan) Kazuki Nakajima ( (Japan) No. 8 Toyota Gazoo Racing); LMP2: (Netherlands) Robin Frijns, (Austria) Ferdinand von Habsburg & (France) Charles Milesi ( (Belgium) No. 31 Team WRT); LMGTE Pro: (United Kingdom) James Calado & (Italy) Alessandro Pier Guidi ( (Italy) No. 51 AF Corse); LMGTE Am: (Denmark) Nicklas Nielsen, (France) François Perrodo & (Italy) Alessio Rovera ( (Italy) No. 83 AF Corse)
6	Horse racing	(United States) 2021 Breeders' Cup Classic	International	Horse: (United States) Knicks Go; Jockey: (Dominican Republic) Joel Rosario; Trainer: (United States) Brad H. Cox
6–7	Triathlon	(Portugal) 2021 World Triathlon Junior Championships	International	Men: (Spain) Igor Bellido Mikhailova; Women: (Germany) Julie Behrens
6–13	Inline speed skating	(Colombia) 2021 Inline Speed Skating World Championships	International	Colombia
6–15	Ten-pin bowling	(United Arab Emirates) 2021 WTBA World Tenpin Bowling Championships	International	Men: (Sweden) James Blomgren; Women: (Singapore) Shayna Ng
7	Formula racing	2021 Mexico City Grand Prix (F1 #18)^{†}	International	(Netherlands) Max Verstappen ( (Austria) Red Bull Racing-Honda)
7	Marathon	(United States) 2021 New York City Marathon (WMM #6)^{†}	International	Men: (Kenya) Albert Korir; Women: (Kenya) Peres Jepchirchir
7	Motorcycle racing	(Portugal) 2021 Algarve motorcycle Grand Prix (MotoGP #17)	International	MotoGP: (Italy) Francesco Bagnaia ( (Italy) Ducati Corse); Moto2: (Australia) Remy Gardner ( (Finland) Red Bull KTM Ajo); Moto3: (Spain) Pedro Acosta ( (Finland) Red Bull KTM Ajo)
7–13	Association football	(Jordan) 2021 AFC Women's Club Championship	Continental	(Jordan) Amman SC
7–13	Curling	(Kazakhstan) 2021 Pacific-Asia Curling Championships	Continental	Men: South Korea; Women: Japan
8–17	Association football	(Tunisia) 2021 UNAF U-20 Tournament	Regional	Tunisia
9–13	Tennis	(Italy) 2021 Next Generation ATP Finals	International	(Spain) Carlos Alcaraz
9–27	Rugby league	(England) 2021 Women's Rugby League World Cup	International	Postponed to 15 October–19 November 2022
10–17	Tennis	(Mexico) 2021 WTA Finals	International	Singles: (Spain) Garbiñe Muguruza; Doubles: (Czech Republic) Barbora Krejčíková & (Czech Republic) Kateřina Siniaková
11–26	Wheelchair rugby league	(England) 2021 Wheelchair Rugby League World Cup	International	Postponed to 15 October–19 November 2022
12–14	3x3 basketball	(United States) 2021 FIBA 3x3 AmeriCup	Continental	Men: United States; Women: United States
12–14	Sambo	(Uzbekistan) 2021 World Sambo Championships	International	Russian Sambo Federation
12–15	Taekwondo	(Bosnia and Herzegovina) 2021 European Junior Taekwondo Championships	Continental	Russia
13–19	Archery	(Bangladesh) 2021 Asian Archery Championships	Continental	South Korea
13–19	Table tennis	(Peru) 2021 Pan American Table Tennis Championships	Continental	Men: (Brazil) Hugo Calderano; Women: (Puerto Rico) Adriana Díaz
13–21	Darts	(England) 2021 Grand Slam of Darts	International	(Wales) Gerwyn Price
14	Formula racing	(Brazil) 2021 São Paulo Grand Prix (F1 #19)	International	(United Kingdom) Lewis Hamilton ( (Germany) Mercedes)
14	Motorcycle racing	(Spain) 2021 Valencian Community motorcycle Grand Prix (MotoGP #18)	International	MotoGP: (Italy) Francesco Bagnaia ( (Italy) Ducati Corse); Moto2: (Spain) Raúl Fernández ( (Finland) Red Bull KTM Ajo); Moto3: (Spain) Xavier Artigas ( (Luxembourg) Leopard Racing)
14–21	Tennis	(Italy) 2021 ATP Finals	International	Singles: (Germany) Alexander Zverev; Doubles: (France) Pierre-Hugues Herbert & (France) Nicolas Mahut
16–21	Karate	(United Arab Emirates) 2021 World Karate Championships	International	Japan
18–21	Golf	(United States) 2021 CME Group Tour Championship	International	(South Korea) Ko Jin-young
18–21	Rallying	(Italy) 2021 Rally Monza (WRC #12)	International	WRC: (France) Sébastien Ogier & (France) Julien Ingrassia ( (Japan) Toyota Gazoo Racing WRT); WRC-2: (Norway) Andreas Mikkelsen & (Norway) Ola Fløene ( (Germany) Toksport WRT); WRC-3: (Italy) Andrea Crugnola & (Italy) Pietro Ometto
18–21	Trampolining	(Azerbaijan) 2021 Trampoline Gymnastics World Championships	International	Russian Gymnastics Federation
19	Association football	(Egypt) 2021 CAF Women's Champions League Final	Continental	(South Africa) Mamelodi Sundowns
19–21	Aesthetic group gymnastics	(Finland) 2021 World Aesthetic Gymnastics Championships	International	Finland; Russia
19–23	Association football	(Tajikistan) 2021 CAFA U-15 Championship	Regional	Iran
20	Association football	(Uruguay) 2021 Copa Sudamericana Final	Continental	(Brazil) Athletico Paranaense
20–27	Curling	(Norway) 2021 European Curling Championships	Continental	Men: Scotland; Women: Scotland
20–28	Multi-sport	(China) 2021 Asian Youth Games	Continental	Postponed to 20–28 December 2022
21	Formula racing	2021 Qatar Grand Prix (F1 #20)	International	(United Kingdom) Lewis Hamilton ( (Germany) Mercedes)
21	Formula racing	(Australia) 2021 Australian Grand Prix (F1)	International	Cancelled
21–2 December	Multi-sport	(Vietnam) 2021 Southeast Asian Games	Regional	Postponed to 12–23 May 2022
23	Association football	(Saudi Arabia) 2021 AFC Champions League Final	Continental	(Saudi Arabia) Al-Hilal
23–29	Table tennis	(United States) 2021 World Table Tennis Championships	International	Men: (China) Fan Zhendong; Women: (China) Wang Manyu
23–5 December	Snooker	(England) 2021 UK Championship (Triple Crown #1)	International	(China) Zhao Xintong
24–3 December	Arm wrestling	(Romania) 2021 World Armwrestling Championship	International	Kazakhstan
24–5 December	Field hockey	(India) 2021 Men's FIH Hockey Junior World Cup	International	Argentina
24–10 December	Chess	(United Arab Emirates) World Chess Championship 2021	International	(Norway) Magnus Carlsen
25–4 December	Multi-sport	(Colombia) 2021 Junior Pan American Games	Continental	Brazil
25–5 December	Tennis	(Austria) / (Italy) / (Spain) 2021 Davis Cup Finals^{†}	International	Russian Tennis Federation
26–28	Darts	(England) 2021 Players Championship Finals	International	Peter Wright
27	Association football	(Uruguay) 2021 Copa Libertadores Final	Continental	(Brazil) Palmeiras
27	Judo	(Russia) 2021 European Mixed Team Judo Championships	Continental	Georgia
27–5 December	Floorball	(Sweden) 2021 Women's World Floorball Championships	International	Sweden
27–5 December	Para powerlifting	(Georgia (country)) 2021 World Para Powerlifting Championships	International	China
28	Darts	(England) 2021 PDC World Youth Championship	International	(England) Ted Evetts
29–6 December	Racquetball	(Guatemala) 2021 Racquetball World Championships	International	Men: (United States) Alejandro Landa; Women: (Mexico) Paola Longoria
29–6 December	Sailing	(Oman) 2021 Laser Radial World Championships	International	Men: (Slovenia) Nik Pletikos; Women: (Belgium) Emma Plasschaert
30–18 December	Association football	(Qatar) 2021 FIFA Arab Cup	International	Algeria

=== December ===
Date	Sport	Venue/Event	Status	Winner/s
1	Taekwondo	(China) 2021 World Taekwondo Championships	International	Cancelled
1–5	Badminton	(Indonesia) 2021 BWF World Tour Finals	International	Men: (Denmark) Viktor Axelsen; Women: (South Korea) An Se-young
1–10	Multi-sport	(Bahrain) 2021 Asian Youth Para Games	Regional	Iran
1–19	Handball	(Spain) 2021 World Women's Handball Championship	International	Norway
2–8	Table tennis	(Portugal) 2021 ITTF World Youth Championships	International	Japan
2–9	Diving	(Ukraine) 2021 FINA World Junior Diving Championships	International	Germany; Ukraine
3–5	Karate	(Egypt) 2021 African Junior & Senior Karate Championships	Continental	Egypt
3–11	Floorball	(Finland) 2020 Men's World Floorball Championships^{†}	International	Sweden
4–5	Formula racing	(Saudi Arabia) 2021 Jeddah Formula 2 round (F2 #7)	International	Sprint race 1: (New Zealand) Marcus Armstrong ( (France) DAMS); Sprint race 2: (Australia) Oscar Piastri ( (Italy) Prema Racing); Feature race: (Australia) Oscar Piastri ( (Italy) Prema Racing)
4–7	Table tennis	(Singapore) 2021 WTT Cup Finals	International	Men: (China) Fan Zhendong; Women: (China) Sun Yingsha
5	Formula racing	(Saudi Arabia) 2021 Saudi Arabian Grand Prix (F1 #21)	International	(United Kingdom) Lewis Hamilton ( (Germany) Mercedes)
5–11	Field hockey	(South Korea) 2021 Women's Asian Champions Trophy	Continental	Japan
5–12	Softball	(Peru) 2021 U-18 Women's Softball World Cup	International	United States
5–16	Field hockey	(South Africa) 2021 Women's FIH Hockey Junior World Cup	International	Postponed to 1–12 April 2022
5–19	Multi-sport	(El Salvador) 2021 Central American Games	Regional	Postponed to 4–19 November 2022
5–1 January 2022	Association football	(Singapore) 2020 AFF Championship^{†}	Regional	Thailand
6–8	Flag football	(Israel) 2021 IFAF Men's Flag Football World Championship (Israel) 2021 IFAF Women's Flag Football World Championship	International	Men: United States; Women: United States
6–9	Air sports	(Romania) 2021 FAI F1D World Championship for Indoor Model Aircraft	International	(United States) Brett Sanborn
6–11	Beach volleyball	(Thailand) 2021 FIVB Beach Volleyball U19 World Championships	International	Men: (France) Teo Rotar and Arthur Canet; Women: (United States) Megan Kraft and Delayne Maple
7–10	Nine-ball pool	(England) 2021 Mosconi Cup	International	Team Europe
7–11	Carom billiards	(Egypt) 2021 UMB World Three-cushion Championship	International	(Netherlands) Dick Jaspers
7–11	Volleyball	(Brazil) 2021 FIVB Volleyball Men's Club World Championship	International	(Brazil) Sada Cruzeiro
7–17	Weightlifting	(Uzbekistan) 2021 World Weightlifting Championships	International	South Korea
7–18	Parachuting	(United Arab Emirates) 6th Dubai International Parachuting Championship	International	Germany
8–11	Teqball	(Poland) 2021 Teqball World Championships	International	Men: (Hungary) Ádám Blázsovics; Women: (Hungary) Anna Izsák
8–12	Sailing	(United States) 2021 Melges 20 World Championships	International	(United States) Daniel Thielman
8–14	Association football	(Honduras) / (Guatemala) 2021 CONCACAF League Final	Continental	(Guatemala) Comunicaciones
8–18 January 2022	Cricket	(Australia) 2021–22 Ashes series	International	Australia
9–12	Figure skating	(Japan) 2021–22 Grand Prix of Figure Skating Final	International	Cancelled
10–12	Artistic gymnastics	(Argentina) 2021 South American Artistic Gymnastics Championships	Continental	Brazil
11–12	Taekwondo	(Turkey) 2021 World Para Taekwondo Championships	International	Russian Taekwondo Union
11–18	Multi-sport	(Finland) 2021 European Youth Olympic Winter Festival	Continental	Postponed to 20–25 March 2022
11–21	Multi-sport	(Switzerland) 2021 Winter Universiade	International	Cancelled
12	Canadian football	(Canada) 108th Grey Cup	Domestic	(Manitoba) Winnipeg Blue Bombers
12	Cross country running	(Republic of Ireland) 2021 European Cross Country Championships	Continental	Men: (Norway) Jakob Ingebrigtsen; Women: (Norway) Karoline Bjerkeli Grøvdal
12	Formula racing	(United Arab Emirates) 2021 Abu Dhabi Grand Prix (F1 #22)	International	(Netherlands) Max Verstappen ( (Austria) Red Bull Racing-Honda)
12–19	Badminton	(Spain) 2021 BWF World Championships	International	Men: (Singapore) Loh Kean Yew; Women: (Japan) Akane Yamaguchi
13–19	Snooker	(England) 2021 World Grand Prix (Cazoo Cup #1)	International	(England) Ronnie O'Sullivan
14–19	Beach volleyball	(Thailand) 2021 FIVB Beach Volleyball U21 World Championships	International	Men: (Sweden) David Åhman and Jonatan Hellvig; Women: (Ukraine) Anhelina Khmil and Tetiana Lazarenko
14–22	Field hockey	(Bangladesh) 2021 Men's Asian Champions Trophy	Continental	South Korea
15–17	Speed skating	(Canada) 2022 Four Continents Speed Skating Championships	International	United States
15–18	Parachuting	(Russia) 6th FAI European Para-Ski Championships	Continental	Cancelled
15–19	Volleyball	(Turkey) 2021 FIVB Volleyball Women's Club World Championship	International	(Turkey) VakıfBank İstanbul
15–3 January 2022	Darts	(England) 2022 PDC World Darts Championship	International	(Scotland) Peter Wright
16–18	Tennis	(United Arab Emirates) 2021 Mubadala World Tennis Championship	International	Men: (Russia) Andrey Rublev; Women: (Tunisia) Ons Jabeur
16–21	Swimming	(United Arab Emirates) 2021 FINA World Swimming Championships (25 m)	International	United States
17–18	3x3 basketball	(Saudi Arabia) 2021 FIBA 3x3 World Tour Final	International	(Serbia) Liman
18–19	Off-road racing	(United Kingdom) 2021 Jurassic X-Prix (Extreme E #5)	International	(Spain) Cristina Gutiérrez & (France) Sébastien Loeb ( (United Kingdom) Team X44)
19–22	Karate	(Kazakhstan) 2021 Asian Karate Championships	Continental	Japan
22	Association football	(Qatar) 2021 CAF Super Cup	Continental	(Egypt) Al Ahly
25–30	Chess	(Poland) World Rapid Chess Championship 2021 (Poland) World Blitz Chess Championship 2021	International	Open Rapid: (Uzbekistan) Nodirbek Abdusattorov; Women Rapid: Alexandra Kosteniuk; Open Blitz: (France) Maxime Vachier-Lagrave; Women Blitz: (Kazakhstan) Bibisara Assaubayeva
26–5 January 2022	Ice hockey	(Canada) 2022 World Junior Ice Hockey Championships	International	Cancelled
28–4 January 2022	Cross-country skiing	(Switzerland) / (Germany) / (Italy) 2021–22 Tour de Ski	International	Men's: (Norway) Johannes Høsflot Klæbo; Women's: (Russia) Natalya Nepryayeva
28–6 January 2022	Ski jumping	(Germany) / (Austria) 2021–22 Four Hills Tournament	International	(Japan) Ryōyū Kobayashi
TBD	Association football	(Jordan) 2021 WAFF Women's Clubs Championship	Regional	Postponed to 14–22 July 2022
