= 2021 WRC =

2021 WRC may refer to:

- 2021 World Rally Championship
- 2021 World Ringette Championships
- 2021 World Rowing Championships
- 2021 World Rowing Cup
