= 2021 LEN Men's European Junior Water Polo Championships =

Tournament details
- Venue: 1 (in 1 host city)
- Dates: 17–27 June 2021 (Qualification); 12–19 September 2021
- Teams: 16

Final positions
- Champions: Serbia
- Runners-up: Greece
- Third place: Hungary
- Fourth place: Spain

Tournament statistics
- Matches played: 48

The 2021 LEN Men's European Junior Water Polo Championships, took place between 12 and 19 September 2021, in Malta. It was the third time that Malta had hosted the event, after previously hosting it in 2007 and 2017.

== Qualification ==
The top 2 teams out of each group qualified for the tournament, along with the top 8 teams from the 2019 championships, leading to 16 qualified teams overall.

=== Group A ===
Group A of the qualifying round took place in Korčula, Croatia, between 25 and 27 June 2021.

Pos	Team	Pld	W	D	L	GF	GA	GD	Pts	Qualification
1	Croatia	3	3	0	0	63	12	+51	9	Qualified
2	Ukraine	3	2	0	1	26	35	−9	6	Qualified
3	France	3	1	0	2	33	30	+3	3	
4	Bulgaria	3	0	0	3	20	65	−45	0	

Source: Summary

Round Robin Summary Table
Country	Croatia	Ukraine	France	Bulgaria
Croatia	—N/a	15–4	17–4	32–4
Ukraine	4–15	—	9–8	13–12
France	4–17	8–9	—	21–4
Bulgaria	4–32	12–13	4–21	—

=== Group B ===
Group B of the qualifying round took place in Tbilisi, Georgia, between 17 and 20 June 2021.

Pos	Team	Pld	W	D	L	GF	GA	GD	Pts	Qualification
1	Georgia	4	4	0	0	81	32	+49	12	Qualified
2	Belarus	4	3	0	1	57	45	+12	9	Qualified
3	Slovakia	4	2	0	2	43	47	−4	6	
4	Lithuania	4	1	0	3	40	64	−24	3	
5	Moldova	4	0	0	4	39	72	−33	0	

Source: Summary

Round Robin Summary Table
Country	Georgia	Belarus	Slovakia	Lithuania	Moldova
Georgia	—	17–10	17–7	20–8	27–7
Belarus	10–17	—	12–7	20–8	15–13
Slovakia	7–17	7–12	—	12–11	17–7
Lithuania	8–20	8–20	11–12	—	13–12
Moldova	7–27	13–15	7–17	12–13	—

=== Group C ===
Group C of the qualifying round took place in Maribor, Slovenia, between 24 and 27 June 2021.

Pos	Team	Pld	W	D	L	GF	GA	GD	Pts	Qualification
1	Russia	4	4	0	0	87	12	+75	12	Qualified
2	Romania	4	3	0	1	63	31	+32	9	Qualified
3	Slovenia	4	2	0	2	56	48	+8	6	
4	Great Britain	4	1	0	3	38	69	−31	3	
5	Austria	4	0	0	4	17	101	−84	0	

Source: Summary

Round Robin Summary Table
Country	Russia	Romania	Slovenia	Great Britain	Austria
Russia	—	14–3	17–5	31–3	25–1
Romania	3–14	—	18–8	18–6	24–4
Slovenia	5–17	8–18	—	15–6	28–7
United Kingdom	3–31	6–18	6–15	—	24–5
Austria	1–25	4–24	7–28	5–24	—

=== Group D ===
Group D of the qualifying round took place in Prague, Czech Republic, between 24 and 27 June 2021.

Pos	Team	Pld	W	D	L	GF	GA	GD	Pts	Qualification
1	Netherlands	4	4	0	0	79	22	+57	12	Qualified
2	Turkey	4	3	0	1	59	35	+24	9	Qualified
3	Czech Republic	4	2	0	2	42	38	+4	6	
4	Switzerland	4	1	0	3	23	55	−32	3	
5	Poland	4	0	0	4	25	78	−53	0	

Source: Summary

Round Robin Summary Table
Country	Netherlands	Turkey	Czech Republic	Switzerland	Poland
Netherlands	—	15–10	16–6	24–2	24–4
Turkey	10–15	—	10–8	13–5	26–7
Czech Republic	6–16	8–10	—	11–5	17–7
Switzerland	2–24	5–13	5–11	—	11–7
Poland	4–24	7–26	7–17	7–11	—

== Preliminary round ==
All times are local (UTC+2).

=== Group A ===
Pos	Team	Pld	W	D	L	GF	GA	GD	Pts	Qualification
1	Montenegro	3	2	1	0	43	22	+21	7	Quarterfinals
2	Netherlands	3	2	0	1	33	17	+16	6	Play-offs
3	Italy	3	1	1	1	24	22	+2	4	Play-offs
4	Ukraine	3	0	0	3	15	54	−39	0	13th place classification

Updated to match(es) played on 14 September 2021. Source: LEN

12 September 2021; 09:00	Report	Montenegro	26–6	Ukraine	Referees: Carlos Ortega (ESP), Akif Uz (TUR)
12 September 2021; 09:00	Report	Score by quarters: 6–1, 8–0, 5–2, 7–3			Referees: Carlos Ortega (ESP), Akif Uz (TUR)

12 September 2021; 17:40	Report	Netherlands	8–5	Italy	Referees: Vladimir Golikov (RUS), Levan Berishvili (GEO)
12 September 2021; 17:40	Report	Score by quarters: 2–0, 3–1, 1–2, 2–2			Referees: Vladimir Golikov (RUS), Levan Berishvili (GEO)

13 September 2021; 13:00	Report	Ukraine	5–10	Italy	Referees: Vladimir Golikov (RUS), Maro Savinović (CRO)
13 September 2021; 13:00	Report	Score by quarters: 0–2, 0–4, 2–2, 3–2			Referees: Vladimir Golikov (RUS), Maro Savinović (CRO)

13 September 2021; 16:20	Report	Netherlands	7–8	Montenegro	Referees: Spyridon Achladiotis (GRE), Tamas Kovacs (HUN)
13 September 2021; 16:20	Report	Score by quarters: 3–5, 1–0, 1–2, 2–1			Referees: Spyridon Achladiotis (GRE), Tamas Kovacs (HUN)

14 September 2021; 11:40	Report	Montenegro	9–9	Italy	Referees: Maro Savinović (CRO), Carlos Ortega (ESP)
14 September 2021; 11:40	Report	Score by quarters: 3–1, 2–3, 2–3, 2–2			Referees: Maro Savinović (CRO), Carlos Ortega (ESP)

14 September 2021; 15:00	Report	Netherlands	18–4	Ukraine	Referees: Mihnea Ioan Alexandrescu (ROU), Ralf Muller (GER)
14 September 2021; 15:00	Report	Score by quarters: 3–0, 5–0, 3–3, 7–1			Referees: Mihnea Ioan Alexandrescu (ROU), Ralf Muller (GER)

=== Group B ===
Pos	Team	Pld	W	D	L	GF	GA	GD	Pts	Qualification
1	Spain	3	3	0	0	39	23	+16	9	Quarterfinals
2	Croatia	3	2	0	1	27	19	+8	6	Play-offs
3	Romania	3	1	0	2	20	32	−12	3	Play-offs
4	Malta (H)	3	0	0	3	23	35	−12	0	13th place classification

Updated to match(es) played on 14 September 2021. Source: LEN
(H) Hosts

12 September 2021; 13:00	Report	Croatia	7–8	Spain	Referees: Daniele Bianco (ITA), Tamás Kovács (HUN)
12 September 2021; 13:00	Report	Score by quarters: 1–0, 3–3, 2–2, 1–3			Referees: Daniele Bianco (ITA), Tamás Kovács (HUN)

12 September 2021; 19:00	Report	Malta	7–9	Romania	Referees: Veselin Mišković (MNE), Giorgi Makharadze (UKR)
12 September 2021; 19:00	Report	Score by quarters: 2–3, 2–2, 1–3, 2–1			Referees: Veselin Mišković (MNE), Giorgi Makharadze (UKR)

13 September 2021; 11:40	Report	Romania	6–15	Spain	Referees: Daniele Bianco (ITA), Akif Uz (TUR)
13 September 2021; 11:40	Report	Score by quarters: 2–4, 1–4, 3–4, 0–3			Referees: Daniele Bianco (ITA), Akif Uz (TUR)

13 September 2021; 19:00	Report	Malta	6–10	Croatia	Referees: Erwin Schapers (NED), Philipp Golosoun (BLR)
13 September 2021; 19:00	Report	Score by quarters: 2–1, 1–4, 2–2, 1–3			Referees: Erwin Schapers (NED), Philipp Golosoun (BLR)

14 September 2021; 10:20	Report	Croatia	10–5	Romania	Referees: Spyridon Achladiotis (GRE), Philipp Golosoun (BLR)
14 September 2021; 10:20	Report	Score by quarters: 2–1, 1–1, 4–2, 3–1			Referees: Spyridon Achladiotis (GRE), Philipp Golosoun (BLR)

14 September 2021; 19:00	Report	Malta	10–16	Spain
14 September 2021; 19:00	Report	Score by quarters: 5–3, 1–2, 3–5, 1–6

=== Group C ===
Pos	Team	Pld	W	D	L	GF	GA	GD	Pts	Qualification
1	Hungary	3	3	0	0	45	22	+23	9	Quarterfinals
2	Russia	3	2	0	1	36	28	+8	6	Play-offs
3	Germany	3	1	0	2	31	31	0	3	Play-offs
4	Belarus	3	0	0	3	22	53	−31	0	13th place classification

Updated to match(es) played on 14 September 2021. Source: LEN

12 September 2021; 10:20	Report	Germany	18–9	Belarus	Referees: Alex de Raffaele (MLT), Mihnea Iona Alexandrescu (ROU)
12 September 2021; 10:20	Report	Score by quarters: 6–1, 5–2, 4–2, 3–4			Referees: Alex de Raffaele (MLT), Mihnea Iona Alexandrescu (ROU)

12 September 2021; 16:20	Report	Russia	11–13	Hungary	Referees: Spyridon Achladiotis (GRE), Ivan Raković (SRB)
12 September 2021; 16:20	Report	Score by quarters: 2–6, 2–1, 3–4, 4–2			Referees: Spyridon Achladiotis (GRE), Ivan Raković (SRB)

13 September 2021; 10:20	Report	Belarus	6–19	Hungary	Referees: Levan Berishvili (GEO), Ivan Rakovic (SRB)
13 September 2021; 10:20	Report	Score by quarters: 2–5, 1–4, 2–4, 1–6			Referees: Levan Berishvili (GEO), Ivan Rakovic (SRB)

13 September 2021; 15:00	Report	Russia	9–8	Germany	Referees: Veselin Miskovic (MNE), Alex Ortega (ESP)
13 September 2021; 15:00	Report	Score by quarters: 2–3, 4–1, 2–2, 1–2			Referees: Veselin Miskovic (MNE), Alex Ortega (ESP)

14 September 2021; 13:00	Report	Germany	5–13	Hungary	Referees: Levan Berishvili (GEO), Akif Uz (TUR)
14 September 2021; 13:00	Report	Score by quarters: 1–4, 3–3, 0–5, 1–1			Referees: Levan Berishvili (GEO), Akif Uz (TUR)

14 September 2021; 16:20	Report	Russia	16–7	Belarus	Referees: Ivan Rakovic (SRB), Erwin Schapers (NED)
14 September 2021; 16:20	Report	Score by quarters: 4–0, 4–1, 5–2, 3–4			Referees: Ivan Rakovic (SRB), Erwin Schapers (NED)

=== Group D ===
Pos	Team	Pld	W	D	L	GF	GA	GD	Pts	Qualification
1	Serbia	3	3	0	0	43	24	+19	9	Quarterfinals
2	Greece	3	2	0	1	35	21	+14	6	Play-offs
3	Georgia	3	1	0	2	32	38	−6	3	Play-offs
4	Turkey	3	0	0	3	18	45	−27	0	13th place classification

Updated to match(es) played on 14 September 2021. Source: LEN

12 September 2021; 11:40	Report	Serbia	17–3	Turkey	Referees: Erwin Schapers (NED), Philipp Golosoun (BLR)
12 September 2021; 11:40	Report	Score by quarters: 4–0, 5–0, 5–2, 3–1			Referees: Erwin Schapers (NED), Philipp Golosoun (BLR)

12 September 2021; 15:00	Report	Georgia	7–11	Greece	Referees: Maro Savinović (CRO), Ralf Muller (GER)
12 September 2021; 15:00	Report	Score by quarters: 2–4, 1–1, 2–4, 2–2			Referees: Maro Savinović (CRO), Ralf Muller (GER)

13 September 2021; 09:00	Report	Turkey	5–16	Greece
13 September 2021; 09:00	Report	Score by quarters: 1–5, 1–3, 2–4, 1–4

13 September 2021; 17:40	Report	Georgia	13–17	Serbia	Referees: Mihnea Ioan Alexandrescu (ROU), Ralf Muller (GER)
13 September 2021; 17:40	Report	Score by quarters: 3–3, 6–5, 2–4, 2–5			Referees: Mihnea Ioan Alexandrescu (ROU), Ralf Muller (GER)

14 September 2021; 09:00	Report	Serbia	9–8	Greece	Referees: Daniele Bianco (ITA), Tamas Kovacs (HUN)
14 September 2021; 09:00	Report	Score by quarters: 2–2, 2–1, 3–4, 2–1			Referees: Daniele Bianco (ITA), Tamas Kovacs (HUN)

14 September 2021; 17:40	Report	Georgia	12–10	Turkey	Referees: Veselin Miskovic (MNE), Alex De Raffaele (MLT)
14 September 2021; 17:40	Report	Score by quarters: 3–3, 2–2, 3–2, 4–3			Referees: Veselin Miskovic (MNE), Alex De Raffaele (MLT)

== Knockout stage ==
=== Bracket ===
Play-offs
15 September
Netherlands	10
Germany	9
15 September
Croatia	17
Georgia	4
15 September
Russia	16
Italy (PSO)	17
15 September
Greece	5
Romania	4

Quarterfinals
16 September
Netherlands	10
Serbia	11
16 September
Croatia	4
Hungary	10
16 September
Italy	13
Spain (PSO)	14
16 September
Greece	12
Montenegro	11

Semifinals
17 September
Serbia	12
Hungary	10
17 September
Spain	8
Greece	11

Final
19 September
Serbia	10
Greece	6
Third place
19 September
Hungary (PSO)	13
Spain	12

5th place bracket

5–8th place semifinals
17 September
Netherlands	7
Croatia	10
17 September
Italy	9
Montenegro	10

Fifth place
19 September
Croatia	12
Montenegro	14
Seventh place
19 September
Netherlands	11
Italy	9

9th place bracket

9–12th place semifinals
16 September
Germany	11
Georgia	9
16 September
Russia	17
Romania	8

Ninth place
18 September
Germany	7
Russia	8
Eleventh place
18 September
Georgia	9
Romania	10

13th place bracket

13–16th place semifinals
15 September
Ukraine	10
Belarus	6
15 September
Malta (PSO)	13
Turkey	11

13th place
18 September
Ukraine	4
Malta	12
15th place
18 September
Belarus	12
Turkey	19

=== Play-offs ===
15 September 2021; 10:30	Report	Netherlands	10–9	Germany	Referees: Spyridon Achladiotis (GRE), Vladimir Golikov (RUS)
15 September 2021; 10:30	Report	Score by quarters: 3-1, 0-1, 3-4, 4-3			Referees: Spyridon Achladiotis (GRE), Vladimir Golikov (RUS)

15 September 2021; 12:00	Report	Russia	16–17 (PSO)	Italy	Referees: Tamás Kovács (HUN), Veselin Mišković (MNE)
15 September 2021; 12:00	Report	Score by quarters: 4–2, 3–1, 2–4, 0–2 PSO: 7–8			Referees: Tamás Kovács (HUN), Veselin Mišković (MNE)

15 September 2021; 16:00	Report	Croatia	17–4	Georgia	Referees: Carlos Ortega (ESP), Daniele Bianco (ITA)
15 September 2021; 16:00	Report	Score by quarters: 0–0, 7–1, 4–1, 6–2			Referees: Carlos Ortega (ESP), Daniele Bianco (ITA)

15 September 2021; 17:30	Report	Greece	5–4	Romania	Referees: Maro Savinović (CRO), Ivan Raković (SRB)
15 September 2021; 17:30	Report	Score by quarters: 2–1, 1–3, 1–0, 1–0			Referees: Maro Savinović (CRO), Ivan Raković (SRB)

=== Quarterfinals ===
16 September 2021; 12:00	Report	Netherlands	10–11	Serbia	Referees: Spyridon Achladiotis (GRE), Veselin Mišković (MNE)
16 September 2021; 12:00	Report	Score by quarters: 1–1, 2–1, 2–4, 5–5			Referees: Spyridon Achladiotis (GRE), Veselin Mišković (MNE)

16 September 2021; 16:00	Report	Italy	13–14 (PSO)	Spain	Referees: Ivan Rakovic (SRB), Levan Berishvili (GEO)
16 September 2021; 16:00	Report	Score by quarters: 1–3, 2–2, 4–1, 3–4 PSO: 3–4			Referees: Ivan Rakovic (SRB), Levan Berishvili (GEO)

16 September 2021; 17:30	Report	Croatia	4–10	Hungary	Referees: Carlos Ortega (ESP), Vladimir Golikov (RUS)
16 September 2021; 17:30	Report	Score by quarters: 1–2, 0–3, 2–2, 1–3			Referees: Carlos Ortega (ESP), Vladimir Golikov (RUS)

16 September 2021; 19:00	Report	Greece	12–11	Montenegro	Referees: Tamas Kovacs (HUN), Maro Savinović (CRO)
16 September 2021; 19:00	Report	Score by quarters: 2–2, 3–3, 4–6, 3–0			Referees: Tamas Kovacs (HUN), Maro Savinović (CRO)

=== 13–16th place semifinals ===
15 September 2021; 09:00	Report	Ukraine	10–6	Belarus	Referees: Ralf Muller (GER), Erwin Schapers (NED)
15 September 2021; 09:00	Report	Score by quarters: 2–2, 4–1, 2–2, 2–1			Referees: Ralf Muller (GER), Erwin Schapers (NED)

15 September 2021; 19:00	Report	Malta	13–11 (PSO)	Turkey	Referees: Levan Berishvili (GEO), Mihnea Ioan Alexandrescu (ROU)
15 September 2021; 19:00	Report	Score by quarters: 2–4, 0–2, 1–2, 5–0 PSO: 5–3			Referees: Levan Berishvili (GEO), Mihnea Ioan Alexandrescu (ROU)

=== 9–12th place semifinals ===
16 September 2021; 09:00	Report	Germany	11–9	Georgia	Referees: Akif Uz (TUR), Philipp Golosoun (BLR)
16 September 2021; 09:00	Report	Score by quarters: 3–2, 1–1, 3–3, 4–3			Referees: Akif Uz (TUR), Philipp Golosoun (BLR)

16 September 2021; 10:30	Report	Russia	17–8	Romania	Referees: Giorgi Makharadze (UKR), Alex De Raffaele (MLT)
16 September 2021; 10:30	Report	Score by quarters: 4–5, 2–1, 3–1, 8–1			Referees: Giorgi Makharadze (UKR), Alex De Raffaele (MLT)

=== 5–8th place semifinals ===
17 September 2021; 15:00	Report	Netherlands	7–10	Croatia	Referees: Carlos Ortega (ESP), Spyridon Achladiotis (GRE)
17 September 2021; 15:00	Report	Score by quarters: 2–3, 1–3, 3–1, 1–3			Referees: Carlos Ortega (ESP), Spyridon Achladiotis (GRE)

17 September 2021; 16:30	Report	Italy	9–10	Montenegro	Referees: Tamás Kovács (HUN), Ivan Raković (SRB)
17 September 2021; 16:30	Report	Score by quarters: 1–0, 1–4, 4–5, 3–1			Referees: Tamás Kovács (HUN), Ivan Raković (SRB)

=== Semifinals ===
17 September 2021; 18:00	Report	Serbia	12–10	Hungary	Referees: Maro Savinović (CRO), Vladimir Golikov (RUS)
17 September 2021; 18:00	Report	Score by quarters: 3–2, 3–0, 6–4, 0–4			Referees: Maro Savinović (CRO), Vladimir Golikov (RUS)

17 September 2021; 19:30	Report	Spain	8–11	Greece	Referees: Veselin Mišković (MNE), Daniele Bianco (ITA)
17 September 2021; 19:30	Report	Score by quarters: 3–3, 2–2, 2–3, 1–3			Referees: Veselin Mišković (MNE), Daniele Bianco (ITA)

=== 15th place game ===
18 September 2021; 15:00	Report	Belarus	12–19	Turkey	Referees: Ralf Muller (GER), Mihnea Ioan Alexandrescu (ROU)
18 September 2021; 15:00	Report	Score by quarters: 4–5, 1–8, 4–3, 3–3			Referees: Ralf Muller (GER), Mihnea Ioan Alexandrescu (ROU)

=== 13th place game ===
18 September 2021; 16:30	Report	Ukraine	4–12	Malta	Referees: Philipp Golosoun (BLR), Akif Uz (TUR)
18 September 2021; 16:30	Report	Score by quarters: 2–2, 0–2, 1–4, 1–4			Referees: Philipp Golosoun (BLR), Akif Uz (TUR)

=== Eleventh place game ===
18 September 2021; 18:00	Report	Georgia	9–10	Romania	Referees: Giorgi Makharadze (UKR), Alex de Raffaele (MLT)
18 September 2021; 18:00	Report	Score by quarters: 4–2, 1–5, 2–1, 2–2			Referees: Giorgi Makharadze (UKR), Alex de Raffaele (MLT)

=== Ninth place game ===
18 September 2021; 19:30	Report	Germany	7–8	Russia	Referees: Levan Berishvili (GEO), Erwin Schapers (NED)
18 September 2021; 19:30	Report	Score by quarters: 0–3, 1–0, 2–3, 4–2			Referees: Levan Berishvili (GEO), Erwin Schapers (NED)

=== Seventh place game ===
19 September 2021; 15:00	Report	Netherlands	11–9	Italy	Referees: Veselin Mišković (MNE), Vladimir Golikov (RUS)
19 September 2021; 15:00	Report	Score by quarters: 5–2, 2–2, 1–2, 3–3			Referees: Veselin Mišković (MNE), Vladimir Golikov (RUS)

=== Fifth place game ===
19 September 2021; 16:30	Report	Croatia	12–14	Montenegro	Referees: Carlos Ortega (ESP), Tamás Kovács (HUN)
19 September 2021; 16:30	Report	Score by quarters: 4–3, 3–4, 3–2, 2–5			Referees: Carlos Ortega (ESP), Tamás Kovács (HUN)

=== Third place game ===
19 September 2021; 18:00	Report	Hungary	13–12 (PSO)	Spain	Referees: Ivan Rakovic (SRB), Spyridon Achladiotis (GRE)
19 September 2021; 18:00	Report	Score by quarters: 1–2, 2–3, 3–2, 2–1 PSO: 5–4			Referees: Ivan Rakovic (SRB), Spyridon Achladiotis (GRE)

=== Final ===
19 September 2021; 19:30	Report	Serbia	10–6	Greece	Referees: Maro Savinovic (CRO), Daniele Bianco (ITA)
19 September 2021; 19:30	Report	Score by quarters: 2–0, 2–3, 3–1, 3–2			Referees: Maro Savinovic (CRO), Daniele Bianco (ITA)

== Final rankings ==
Rank	Team
1st place, gold medalist(s)	Serbia
2nd place, silver medalist(s)	Greece
3rd place, bronze medalist(s)	Hungary
4	Spain
5	Montenegro
6	Croatia
7	Netherlands
8	Italy
9	Russia
10	Germany
11	Romania
12	Georgia
13	Malta
14	Ukraine
15	Turkey
16	Belarus

== Medalists ==
Gold	Silver	Bronze
