= 2021 European Kata Judo Junior Championships =

Junior judo event held in 2021 in Poland

- Location: Warsaw, Poland
- Start date: 3 July 2021
- End date: 4 July 2021

The 2021 European Kata Judo Junior Championships was a judo competition, taking place from 3–4 July 2021 in Poland.

== Medal summary ==
One competition did not have a bronze and silver medal.

=== Medal table ===
* Host nation (Host)

Rank	Nation	Gold	Silver	Bronze	Total
1	Russia	1	2	1	4
2	Poland*	1	1	1	3
3	Netherlands	1	0	0	1
3	Slovakia	1	0	0	1
5	Ukraine	0	0	1	1
Totals (5 entries)		4	3	3	10

=== Results ===
Event	Gold	Silver	Bronze
Nage No Kata 3G	Russia; Borislav Khamidullin; Sviatoslav Khamidullin	Russia; Nikolai Zhikharev; Iaroslav Zhikharev	Ukraine; Diana Borysenko; Vitalii Khrapach
Nage No Kata 5G	Netherlands; Maik van der Hulst; Kevin van der Hulst	Poland; Aleksandra Masternak; Patryk Urban	Poland; Klaudia Wroblewska; Kacper Rola
Katame No Kata	Slovakia; Dominika Kincelova; Milan Rujak	Russia; German Savchenko; Ivan Isakov	Russia; Vladislav Burmentev; Daniil Sidorov
Ju No Kata	Poland; Antoni Ptak; Stanislaw Ptak	No silver medal	No bronze medal
