= 2021 World Kata Championships =

2021 Judo World Kata Championships
- Venue: Estádio Universitário de Lisboa
- Location: Lisbon, Portugal
- Dates: 26–27 October 2021
- Competitors: 206 from 25 nations

Competition at external databases
- Links: IJF • EJU

The 2021 World Kata Championships were held from 26 to 27 October 2021 in Lisbon, Portugal. During the 2021 World Kata Championships the athletes entered could perform in 5 kata (Nage-no-kata, Katame-no-kata, Ju-no-kata, Kime-no-kata, Kodokan-Goshin-jutsu), two of which (Nage-no-kata and katame-no-kata) were also accessible for the first time to junior competitors aged under 23.

== Medalists ==
Event	Gold	Silver	Bronze
Nage-no-kata	Netherlands; Erik Faes; Niels Neumann	Colombia; Glatenferd Escobar; Miguel Bermúdez	Spain; Antonio Marín Gómez Nieves; Eduardo Ayala Torrado
Katame-no-kata	Japan; Ryuji Kabata; Toshiji Odaten	Italy; Andrea Fregnan; Pietro Corcioni	Belgium; Nicolas Gilon; Jean-Philippe Gilon
Ju-no-kata	Japan; Momoko Ishida; Mariko Ishida	Germany; Wolfgang Dax-Romswinkel; Ursula Loosen	Romania; Alina Zaharia; Alina Cheru
Kime-no-kata	France; Michel Jeuffroy; Laurent Jeuffroy	France; Grégory Marques; Stéphane Bega	Spain; Miguel Ángel Vicens Siquier; Antonio Vicens Siquier
Kodokan-goshin-jutsu	Japan; Koo Ikeda; Fumitaka Sakamaki	France; Claude Jaume; Brice Bénard	Portugal; Pedro Gonçalves; Paulo Moreira
Nage-no-kata (junior)	France; Victoria Kraska; Dylan Meddour	Russian Judo Federation; Nikolai Zhikharev; Iaroslav Zhikharev	Poland; Aleksandra Masternak; Patryk Urban
Katame-no-kata (junior)	France; Dylan Meddour; Victoria Kraska	Portugal; João Baptista; José Farias	Russian Judo Federation; Vladislav Burmentev; Daniil Sidorov

== Medal table ==
* Host nation (Portugal)

Rank	Nation	Gold	Silver	Bronze	Total
1	France	3	2	0	5
2	Japan	3	0	0	3
3	Netherlands	1	0	0	1
4	Portugal*	0	1	1	2
4	Russian Judo Federation	0	1	1	2
6	Colombia	0	1	0	1
6	Germany	0	1	0	1
6	Italy	0	1	0	1
9	Spain	0	0	2	2
10	Belgium	0	0	1	1
10	Poland	0	0	1	1
10	Romania	0	0	1	1
Totals (12 entries)		7	7	7	21

== Results ==
=== Nage-no-kata ===
==== Group 1 ====
Place	Athletes	Country	Points
1	Glatenferd Escobar; Miguel Bermúdez	Colombia	412.5
2	Antonio Marín Gómez Nieves; Eduardo Ayala Torrado	Spain	406.0
3	Yagoub Al-Shmrani; Ali Meneiawi	Saudi Arabia	401.0
4	Ludovic Germa; Jessie Vinette	France	400.5
5	Maik van der Hulst; Kevin van der Hulst	Netherlands	396.5
6	Fabiano Rodrigo de Barros; Yann Fiorda Prando	Brazil	391.5
7	Nuno Ferreira; Diogo Ferreira	Portugal	388.5
8	Maciej Pudłowski; Anita Krawczyk	Poland	375.0
9	Gino Gianmarco Stefanel; Alessandro Cugini	Italy	373.5
10	Gerardo Tello; Sergio Suguieda	United States	343.5
11	Klaudia Wróblewska; Kacper Rola	Poland	335.5

==== Group 2 ====
Place	Athletes	Country	Points
1	Cedric Goulard; Thomas Caillard	France	410.5
2	Edwim Gómez; Gerardo Restrepo	Colombia	402.0
3	Erik Faes; Niels Neumann	Netherlands	399.5
4	Carlos Alberto Pereira; Taluan Nogueira	Brazil	391.5
5	Bartosz Machna; Dawid Kajdy	Poland	390.0
6	Unai Saralegui Vallejo; Unai Reguillaga Eizaguirre	Spain	388.0
7	Martin Hinteregger; Philipp Hinteregger	Austria	378.5
8	Luís Nogueira; Lucas Maia	Portugal	358.0
9	Ho Shing Heen; Hung Long Tsun	Hong Kong	328.0
10	Osama Niyaz; Mounis Hawsawi	Saudi Arabia	321.0
11	Erin Reim; Marika Boileau	Canada	303.5

==== Final ====
Place	Athletes	Country	Points
1st place, gold medalist(s)	Erik Faes; Niels Neumann	Netherlands	415.0
2nd place, silver medalist(s)	Glatenferd Escobar; Miguel Bermúdez	Colombia	414.0
3rd place, bronze medalist(s)	Antonio Marín Gómez Nieves; Eduardo Ayala Torrado	Spain	411.0
4	Edwim Gómez; Gerardo Restrepo	Colombia	408.0
5	Yagoub Al-Shmrani; Ali Meneiawi	Saudi Arabia	403.5
6	Cedric Goulard; Thomas Caillard	France	398.5

=== Katame-no-kata ===
==== Group 1 ====
Place	Athletes	Country	Points
1	Ryuji Kabata; Toshiji Odate	Japan	423.5
2	Tycho van der Werff; David Lefevere	Netherlands	412.5
3	Shane Rooney; Hu Xiao Kang	Canada	397.5
4	Nicolas Fourmaux; Jean Daniel Nguyen Van Loc	France	395.0
5	Dmitry Yung; Sergey Shchetinskiy	RJF	381.5
6	Vanessa Wenzl; Matthias Heinrich	Austria	380.5
7	Massimo Cester; Davide Mauri	Italy	380.0
8	Félix Jiménez Rodríguez; Rafael María Prado Ballestero	Spain	359.0
9	Luís Canaveira; Thiago Marçal Silva	Portugal	353.5
10	Beata Sypniewska; Sebastian Gembalczyk	Poland	353.0

==== Group 2 ====
Place	Athletes	Country	Points
1	Nicolas Gilon; Jean-Philippe Gilon	Belgium	417.5
2	Andrea Fregnan; Pietro Corcioni	Italy	409.5
3	Juan Pedro Goicoechandia Huete; Roberto Villar Aguilera	Spain	399.0
4	Eloy Carlos Rodriguez Matysek; Emmanuel Augeraud	France	398.5
5	Miriam Sikora; Christian Steinert	Germany	397.5
6	Kelly Palmer; Wesley Enns	Canada	385.0
7	Douglas Newcomer; Ray Cox	United States	375.0
8	Dominika Kincelová; Milan Ruják	Slovakia	365.5
9	Dmytro Kalchenko; Hennadii Riabchynskyi	Ukraine	312.0

==== Final ====
Place	Athletes	Country	Points
1st place, gold medalist(s)	Ryuji Kabata; Toshiji Odate	Japan	428.0
2nd place, silver medalist(s)	Andrea Fregnan; Pietro Corcioni	Italy	420.0
3rd place, bronze medalist(s)	Nicolas Gilon; Jean-Philippe Gilon	Belgium	415.5
4	Tycho van der Werff; David Lefevere	Netherlands	411.0
5	Juan Pedro Goicoechandia Huete; Roberto Villar Aguilera	Spain	407.0
6	Shane Rooney; Hu Xiao Kang	Canada	402.5

=== Ju-no-kata ===
==== Group 1 ====
Place	Athletes	Country	Points
1	Wolfgang Dax-Romswinkel; Ursula Loosen	Germany	395.5
2	Alessandro Nuzzi Herrero; Andrea Nuzzi Herrero	Spain	377.5
3	Giovanni Tarabelli; Angelica Tarabelli	Italy	377.0
4	Zoran Grba; Sandra Uršičić	Croatia	367.0
5	Ludovic Michelet; Alice Ballaud	France	362.0
6	Hanna Peinsipp; Paula Peinsipp	Austria	350.0
7	Dumitrita Rus; Mihaela Țipa	Romania	347.5
8	Marie-José Nieuwenhuizen; Irene Suurland	Netherlands	337.5
9	Meggie Aiko Lachaîne; Danielle Ferland	Canada	331.0
10	Frederick Dagdagan; Lee Pasteris	United States	324.0

==== Group 2 ====
Place	Athletes	Country	Points
1	Momoko Ishida; Mariko Ishida	Japan	422.5
2	Alina Zaharia; Alina Cheru	Romania	386.0
3	Mathieu Coulon; Carole Heras	France	381.0
4	Laura Bugo; Barbara Bruni Cerchier	Italy	370.0
5	Mariano Arroyo Martín; Juan Manuel García Pozo	Spain	368.5
6	Ulrich Bröckel; Elke Bröckel	Germany	359.5
7	Fabrice Beney; Laurence Jeanneret Berruex	Switzerland	357.0
8	Yik Lam Nikki Yu; Wing Yan Grace Chan	Hong Kong	346.5
9	Victoria Cleevely; Lisa Cleevely	Great Britain	334.5

==== Final ====
Place	Athletes	Country	Points
1st place, gold medalist(s)	Momoko Ishida; Mariko Ishida	Japan	427.5
2nd place, silver medalist(s)	Wolfgang Dax-Romswinkel; Ursula Loosen	Germany	411.5
3rd place, bronze medalist(s)	Alina Zaharia; Alina Cheru	Romania	398.0
4	Mathieu Coulon; Carole Heras	France	385.5
5	Giovanni Tarabelli; Angelica Tarabelli	Italy	381.0
6	Alessandro Nuzzi Herrero; Andrea Nuzzi Herrero	Spain	369.5

=== Kime-no-kata ===
==== Group 1 ====
Place	Athletes	Country	Points
1	Michel Jeuffroy; Laurent Jeuffroy	France	522.0
2	Grégory Marques; Stéphane Bega	France	517.0
3	Miguel Ángel Vicens Siquier; Antonio Vicens Siquier	Spain	501.0
4	Yuri Ferretti; Andrea Giani Contini	Italy	498.5
5	Mischa Fransen; Yoeri Fransen	Netherlands	498.5
6	Mario Pageau; Martin Vallières	Canada	441.0
7	Zbigniew Wojtowicz; Jacek Kutyba	Poland	435.0

==== Group 2 ====
Place	Athletes	Country	Points
1	Lisa Capriotti; Robert Gouthro	United States	516.5
2	Grégory Rieffel; Philippe Leger	France	514.5
3	Enrico Tommasi; Alberto Gainelli	Italy	509.5
4	Rubén Gil Pérez; Víctor Lechón Lidón	Spain	497.5
5	Sérgio Carvalho; Nuno Rosa	Portugal	482.5
6	Robert Hatzl; Franz Winter	Austria	476.5
7	Sönke Schillig; Johannes Eidinger	Germany	474.5

==== Final ====
Place	Athletes	Country	Points
1st place, gold medalist(s)	Michel Jeuffroy; Laurent Jeuffroy	France	521.5
2nd place, silver medalist(s)	Grégory Marques; Stéphane Bega	France	513.0
3rd place, bronze medalist(s)	Miguel Ángel Vicens Siquier; Antonio Vicens Siquier	Spain	509.0
4	Enrico Tommasi; Alberto Gainelli	Italy	503.5
5	Grégory Rieffel; Philippe Leger	France	500.5
6	Lisa Capriotti; Robert Gouthro	United States	465.5

=== Kodokan-goshin-jutsu ===
==== Group 1 ====
Place	Athletes	Country	Points
1	Koo Ikeda; Fumitaka Sakamaki	Japan	580.5
2	Pedro Gonçalves; Paulo Moreira	Portugal	553.5
3	Juana María Puigserver Sanso; Llorenç Gayà Puigserver	Spain	533.5
4	Thomas Hofmann; Daniel Koliander	Germany	528.0
5	Ilaria Placidi; Nicola Placidi	Italy	528.0
6	Didier Terwinghe; Nicolas Colson	Belgium	514.0
7	Ricky Cleevely; Richard Bannister	Great Britain	504.0
8	Lit Lok Yi; Ng Bo Fai	Hong Kong	502.5
9	Benjamin Mehić; Darko Krašovec	Slovenia	485.5

==== Group 2 ====
Place	Athletes	Country	Points
1	Claude Jaume; Brice Bénard	France	559.5
2	Antoni Obrador Mas; Pedro Marcos Rodríguez	Spain	540.5
3	Leszek Piąstka; Anna Jagiełło	Poland	531.5
4	Yves Engelen; Dimitri Closset	Belgium	523.5
5	José Costa; Verissimo Segurado	Portugal	523.5
6	Allyn Takahashi; Tony Walby	Canada	506.0
7	Xu Yiqi; Leung Cho Fung	Hong Kong	490.5
8	Sergio Loi; Giuseppe Guzzo	Italy	249.3

==== Final ====
Place	Athletes	Country	Points
1st place, gold medalist(s)	Koo Ikeda; Fumitaka Sakamaki	Japan	568.0
2nd place, silver medalist(s)	Claude Jaume; Brice Bénard	France	551.5
3rd place, bronze medalist(s)	Pedro Gonçalves; Paulo Moreira	Portugal	551.5
4	Leszek Piąstka; Anna Jagiełło	Poland	535.5
5	Antoni Obrador Mas; Pedro Marcos Rodríguez	Spain	535.5
6	Juana María Puigserver Sanso; Llorenç Gayà Puigserver	Spain	528.5

=== Nage-no-kata (Junior) ===
==== Preliminary ====
Place	Athletes	Country	Points
1	Nikolai Zhikharev; Iaroslav Zhikharev	RJF	382.5
2	Victoria Kraska; Dylan Meddour	France	371.0
3	Aleksandra Masternak; Patryk Urban	Poland	363.5
4	Ivan Fedorov; Egor Gaiazov	RJF	361.5
5	Álvaro Gayarre Mompel; Alberto Gayarre Mompel	Spain	340.0
6	José Farias; João Baptista	Portugal	335.5
7	Diana Borysenko; Vitalii Khrapach	Ukraine	331.0

==== Final ====
Place	Athletes	Country	Points
1st place, gold medalist(s)	Victoria Kraska; Dylan Meddour	France	393.5
2nd place, silver medalist(s)	Nikolai Zhikharev; Iaroslav Zhikharev	RJF	392.0
3rd place, bronze medalist(s)	Aleksandra Masternak; Patryk Urban	Poland	382.5
4	Ivan Fedorov; Egor Gaiazov	RJF	382.0
5	Álvaro Gayarre Mompel; Alberto Gayarre Mompel	Spain	377.0
6	José Farias; João Baptista	Portugal	373.0

=== Katame-no-kata (Junior) ===
==== Preliminary ====
Place	Athletes	Country	Points
1	Dylan Meddour; Victoria Kraska	France	369.0
2	Vladislav Burmentev; Daniil Sidorov	RJF	353.5
3	João Baptista; José Farias	Portugal	346.0
4	Diana Borysenko; Vitalii Khrapach	Ukraine	316.0

==== Final ====
Place	Athletes	Country	Points
1st place, gold medalist(s)	Dylan Meddour; Victoria Kraska	France	401.0
2nd place, silver medalist(s)	João Baptista; José Farias	Portugal	374.5
3rd place, bronze medalist(s)	Vladislav Burmentev; Daniil Sidorov	RJF	363.0
4	Diana Borysenko; Vitalii Khrapach	Ukraine	329.5
