= Time in Malta =

Time in Malta follows Central European Time (CET), which is one hour ahead of Coordinated Universal Time (UTC). Malta observes daylight saving time from the last Sunday in March until the last Sunday in October. Europe/Malta is the only IANA time zone database for Malta.
