= 2021 World Rowing Championships =

International rowing event

2021 World Championships
- Location: Shanghai, China
- Dates: 17–24 October

The 2021 World Rowing Championships was planned to be held from 17 to 24 October 2021 in Shanghai, China. Due to COVID-19-related mitigation issues, the event was cancelled by the World Rowing Association at the request of the Shanghai Organising Committee (OC).

Normally, in an Olympic year, the World Rowing Championships would include only the non-Olympic events, but despite the postponement of the 2020 Summer Olympics to 2021 this year's World Championships were planned to include the full range of events.
