= European Inline Speed Skating Championships =

- Status: Active
- Genre: Global sports event
- Frequency: Biannual
- Inaugurated: 1989
- Organiser: European Confederation of Roller Skating (World Skate Europe)

The European Inline Speed Skating Championships is the main inline speed skating championships in Europe, organized by European Confederation of Roller Skating.

== Ages ==
- Age Group: Senior, Junior A and Junior B.
- Junior A is for 18 and 19 year olds and Junior B is for 16 and 17 year olds.
- Veteran

== Editions ==
| # | Edition | City | Country | Events |
|---|---|---|---|---|
| 1 | 1989 | Pico | Portugal | |
| 2 | 1990 | Inzell | Germany | |
| 3 | 1991 | Pineto/Pescara | Italy | |
| 4 | 1992 | Acireale | Italy | |
| 5 | 1993 | Valence d'Agen | France | |
| 6 | 1994 | Pamplona | Spain | |
| 7 | 1995 | Praia da Vitória | Portugal | |
| 8 | 1996 | Saint-Brieuc/Lamballe | France | |
| 9 | 1997 | Roseto/Sulmona/Sangro | Italy | |
| 10 | 1998 | Coulaines | France | |
| 11 | 1999 | Zandvoorde/Ostend/Middelkerke | Belgium | |
| 12 | 2000 | Latina | Italy | |
| 13 | 2001 | Paços de Ferreira | Portugal | |
| 14 | 2002 | Valence d'Agen/Grenade-sur-l'Adour | France | |
| 15 | 2003 | Padua/Abano Terme | Italy | |
| 16 | 2004 | Heerde/Groningen | Netherlands | |
| 17 | 2005 | Jüterbog/Niedergörsdorf/Ludwigsfelde | Germany | |
| 18 | 2006 | Cassano d'Adda | Italy | |
| 19 | 2007 | Estarreja/Ovar | Portugal | |
| 20 | 2008 | Gera | Germany | |
| 21 | 2009 | Oostende | Belgium | |
| 22 | 2010 | San Benedetto del Tronto | Italy | |
| 23 | 2011 | Heerde/Zwolle | Netherlands | |
| 24 | 2012 | Szeged | Hungary | |
| 25 | 2013 | Almere | Netherlands | |
| 26 | 2014 | Geisingen | Germany | |
| 27 | 2015 | Wörgl | Austria | |
| 28 | 2016 | Heerde | Netherlands | |
| 29 | 2017 | Lagos | Portugal | |
| 30 | 2018 | Oostende | Belgium | |
| 31 | 2019 | Pamplona | Spain | |
| 32 | 2021 | Canelas | Portugal | |
| 33 | 2022 | L'Aquila | Italy | |
| 34 | 2023 | Valence-d'Agen | France | |
| 35 | 2024 | Oostende | Belgium | |
| 36 | 2025 | Groß-Gerau | Germany | |
| 37 | 2026 | Cardano al Campo | Italy | |

== Results ==
- de:Inline-Speedskating-Europameisterschaften
- http://www.the-sports.org/inline-skating-european-junior-a-speed-championships-results-2018-epr84375.html
- http://www.the-sports.org/inline-skating-european-junior-b-speed-championships-results-2018-epr84376.html

== Medals Per Editions ==
=== 1989 ===
* Host nation (Portugal)

| Rank | Nation | Gold | Silver | Bronze | Total |
|---|---|---|---|---|---|
| 1 | Italy (ITA) | 22 | 11 | 3 | 36 |
| 2 | Spain (ESP) | 2 | 11 | 4 | 17 |
| 3 | France (FRA) | 2 | 2 | 9 | 13 |
| 4 | Germany (GER) | 2 | 1 | 4 | 7 |
| 5 | Belgium (BEL) | 0 | 3 | 8 | 11 |
| Totals (5 entries) | | 28 | 28 | 28 | 84 |

=== 1990 ===
* Host nation (Germany)

| Rank | Nation | Gold | Silver | Bronze | Total |
|---|---|---|---|---|---|
| 1 | Italy (ITA) | 20 | 8 | 7 | 35 |
| 2 | France (FRA) | 4 | 4 | 6 | 14 |
| 3 | Germany (GER) | 3 | 1 | 2 | 6 |
| 4 | Belgium (BEL) | 1 | 8 | 10 | 19 |
| 5 | Spain (ESP) | 0 | 5 | 3 | 8 |
| 6 | Great Britain (GBR) | 0 | 2 | 0 | 2 |
| Totals (6 entries) | | 28 | 28 | 28 | 84 |

=== 1991 ===
* Host nation (Italy)

| Rank | Nation | Gold | Silver | Bronze | Total |
|---|---|---|---|---|---|
| 1 | Italy (ITA) | 23 | 11 | 4 | 38 |
| 2 | Belgium (BEL) | 2 | 7 | 8 | 17 |
| 3 | France (FRA) | 2 | 6 | 5 | 13 |
| 4 | Spain (ESP) | 1 | 2 | 4 | 7 |
| 5 | Germany (GER) | 0 | 2 | 6 | 8 |
| 6 | Great Britain (GBR) | 0 | 0 | 1 | 1 |
| Totals (6 entries) | | 28 | 28 | 28 | 84 |

=== 1992 ===
* Host nation (Italy)

| Rank | Nation | Gold | Silver | Bronze | Total |
|---|---|---|---|---|---|
| 1 | Italy (ITA) | 22 | 15 | 7 | 44 |
| 2 | France (FRA) | 3 | 3 | 7 | 13 |
| 3 | Belgium (BEL) | 3 | 3 | 4 | 10 |
| 4 | Spain (ESP) | 0 | 6 | 6 | 12 |
| 5 | Germany (GER) | 0 | 1 | 4 | 5 |
| Totals (5 entries) | | 28 | 28 | 28 | 84 |

=== 1993 ===
* Host nation (France)

| Rank | Nation | Gold | Silver | Bronze | Total |
|---|---|---|---|---|---|
| 1 | Italy (ITA) | 17 | 10 | 6 | 33 |
| 2 | France (FRA) | 8 | 5 | 9 | 22 |
| 3 | Spain (ESP) | 3 | 9 | 5 | 17 |
| 4 | Belgium (BEL) | 2 | 3 | 6 | 11 |
| 5 | Germany (GER) | 1 | 3 | 5 | 9 |
| 6 | Netherlands (NED) | 0 | 1 | 0 | 1 |
| Totals (6 entries) | | 31 | 31 | 31 | 93 |

=== 1994 ===
* Host nation (Spain)

| Rank | Nation | Gold | Silver | Bronze | Total |
|---|---|---|---|---|---|
| 1 | Italy (ITA) | 13 | 8 | 3 | 24 |
| 2 | France (FRA) | 12 | 12 | 10 | 34 |
| 3 | Spain (ESP) | 3 | 6 | 9 | 18 |
| 4 | Belgium (BEL) | 3 | 0 | 4 | 7 |
| 5 | Germany (GER) | 1 | 5 | 6 | 12 |
| 6 | Netherlands (NED) | 0 | 1 | 0 | 1 |
| Totals (6 entries) | | 32 | 32 | 32 | 96 |

=== 1995 ===
* Host nation (Portugal)

| Rank | Nation | Gold | Silver | Bronze | Total |
|---|---|---|---|---|---|
| 1 | Italy (ITA) | 12 | 8 | 7 | 27 |
| 2 | Spain (ESP) | 7 | 4 | 5 | 16 |
| 3 | France (FRA) | 6 | 10 | 8 | 24 |
| 4 | Belgium (BEL) | 3 | 3 | 5 | 11 |
| 5 | Germany (GER) | 0 | 3 | 3 | 6 |
| Totals (5 entries) | | 28 | 28 | 28 | 84 |

=== 1996 ===
* Host nation (France)

| Rank | Nation | Gold | Silver | Bronze | Total |
|---|---|---|---|---|---|
| 1 | Italy (ITA) | 18 | 18 | 12 | 48 |
| 2 | France (FRA) | 7 | 10 | 11 | 28 |
| 3 | Spain (ESP) | 3 | 0 | 2 | 5 |
| 4 | Germany (GER) | 0 | 0 | 2 | 2 |
| 5 | Belgium (BEL) | 0 | 0 | 1 | 1 |
| Totals (5 entries) | | 28 | 28 | 28 | 84 |

=== 1997 ===
* Host nation (Italy)

| Rank | Nation | Gold | Silver | Bronze | Total |
|---|---|---|---|---|---|
| 1 | Italy (ITA) | 27 | 18 | 14 | 59 |
| 2 | France (FRA) | 3 | 10 | 9 | 22 |
| 3 | Spain (ESP) | 2 | 4 | 5 | 11 |
| 4 | Belgium (BEL) | 0 | 0 | 2 | 2 |
| 4 | Germany (GER) | 0 | 0 | 2 | 2 |
| Totals (5 entries) | | 32 | 32 | 32 | 96 |

=== 1998 ===
* Host nation (France)

| Rank | Nation | Gold | Silver | Bronze | Total |
|---|---|---|---|---|---|
| 1 | Italy (ITA) | 14 | 13 | 8 | 35 |
| 2 | France (FRA) | 11 | 10 | 14 | 35 |
| 3 | Spain (ESP) | 7 | 6 | 6 | 19 |
| 4 | Belgium (BEL) | 0 | 2 | 1 | 3 |
| 5 | Germany (GER) | 0 | 0 | 2 | 2 |
| Totals (5 entries) | | 32 | 31 | 31 | 94 |

=== 1999 ===
* Host nation (Belgium)

| Rank | Nation | Gold | Silver | Bronze | Total |
|---|---|---|---|---|---|
| 1 | Italy (ITA) | 18 | 14 | 13 | 45 |
| 2 | France (FRA) | 9 | 10 | 7 | 26 |
| 3 | Spain (ESP) | 3 | 6 | 2 | 11 |
| 4 | Germany (GER) | 0 | 0 | 5 | 5 |
| 5 | Belgium (BEL) | 0 | 0 | 3 | 3 |
| Totals (5 entries) | | 30 | 30 | 30 | 90 |

=== 2000 ===
* Host nation (Italy)

| Rank | Nation | Gold | Silver | Bronze | Total |
|---|---|---|---|---|---|
| 1 | Italy (ITA) | 22 | 8 | 15 | 45 |
| 2 | France (FRA) | 5 | 14 | 7 | 26 |
| 3 | Spain (ESP) | 5 | 4 | 7 | 16 |
| 4 | Germany (GER) | 0 | 3 | 2 | 5 |
| 5 | Belgium (BEL) | 0 | 3 | 1 | 4 |
| Totals (5 entries) | | 32 | 32 | 32 | 96 |

=== 2001 ===
* Host nation (Portugal)

| Rank | Nation | Gold | Silver | Bronze | Total |
|---|---|---|---|---|---|
| 1 | Italy (ITA) | 17 | 14 | 10 | 41 |
| 2 | France (FRA) | 8 | 7 | 10 | 25 |
| 3 | Spain (ESP) | 6 | 5 | 4 | 15 |
| 4 | Germany (GER) | 1 | 3 | 3 | 7 |
| 5 | Belgium (BEL) | 0 | 3 | 4 | 7 |
| 6 | Portugal (POR) | 0 | 0 | 1 | 1 |
| Totals (6 entries) | | 32 | 32 | 32 | 96 |

=== 2002 ===
* Host nation (France)

| Rank | Nation | Gold | Silver | Bronze | Total |
|---|---|---|---|---|---|
| 1 | Italy (ITA) | 9 | 4 | 7 | 20 |
| 2 | France (FRA) | 4 | 5 | 6 | 15 |
| 3 | Spain (ESP) | 3 | 6 | 5 | 14 |
| 4 | Belgium (BEL) | 0 | 1 | 1 | 2 |
| 5 | Germany (GER) | 0 | 0 | 3 | 3 |
| Totals (5 entries) | | 16 | 16 | 22 | 54 |

=== 2003 ===
* Host nation (Italy)

| Rank | Nation | Gold | Silver | Bronze | Total |
|---|---|---|---|---|---|
| 1 | Italy (ITA) | 21 | 13 | 7 | 41 |
| 2 | France (FRA) | 2 | 5 | 5 | 12 |
| 3 | Sweden (SWE) | 1 | 0 | 0 | 1 |
| 4 | Belgium (BEL) | 0 | 3 | 2 | 5 |
| 5 | Spain (ESP) | 0 | 2 | 5 | 7 |
| 6 | Germany (GER) | 0 | 1 | 4 | 5 |
| 7 | Netherlands (NED) | 0 | 0 | 1 | 1 |
| Totals (7 entries) | | 24 | 24 | 24 | 72 |

=== 2004 ===
* Host nation (Netherlands)

| Rank | Nation | Gold | Silver | Bronze | Total |
|---|---|---|---|---|---|
| 1 | Italy (ITA) | 14 | 10 | 6 | 30 |
| 2 | France (FRA) | 9 | 3 | 6 | 18 |
| 3 | Great Britain (GBR) | 1 | 0 | 1 | 2 |
| 4 | Netherlands (NED) | 0 | 5 | 2 | 7 |
| 5 | Sweden (SWE) | 0 | 3 | 4 | 7 |
| 6 | Belgium (BEL) | 0 | 1 | 2 | 3 |
| 6 | Germany (GER) | 0 | 1 | 2 | 3 |
| 8 | Spain (ESP) | 0 | 1 | 1 | 2 |
| Totals (8 entries) | | 24 | 24 | 24 | 72 |

=== 2005 ===
* Host nation (Germany)

| Rank | Nation | Gold | Silver | Bronze | Total |
|---|---|---|---|---|---|
| 1 | France (FRA) | 13 | 5 | 3 | 21 |
| 2 | Italy (ITA) | 8 | 12 | 8 | 28 |
| 3 | Germany (GER) | 2 | 1 | 1 | 4 |
| 4 | Sweden (SWE) | 1 | 3 | 5 | 9 |
| 5 | Netherlands (NED) | 0 | 2 | 3 | 5 |
| 6 | Belgium (BEL) | 0 | 1 | 1 | 2 |
| 7 | Spain (ESP) | 0 | 0 | 3 | 3 |
| Totals (7 entries) | | 24 | 24 | 24 | 72 |

=== 2006 ===
* Host nation (Italy)

| Rank | Nation | Gold | Silver | Bronze | Total |
|---|---|---|---|---|---|
| 1 | Italy (ITA) | 13 | 11 | 10 | 34 |
| 2 | France (FRA) | 9 | 1 | 5 | 15 |
| 3 | Germany (GER) | 1 | 4 | 1 | 6 |
| 4 | Spain (ESP) | 1 | 3 | 3 | 7 |
| 5 | Sweden (SWE) | 0 | 2 | 3 | 5 |
| 6 | Belgium (BEL) | 0 | 2 | 2 | 4 |
| 7 | Netherlands (NED) | 0 | 1 | 2 | 3 |
| Totals (7 entries) | | 24 | 24 | 26 | 74 |

=== 2007 ===
* Host nation (Portugal)

| Rank | Nation | Gold | Silver | Bronze | Total |
|---|---|---|---|---|---|
| 1 | Italy (ITA) | 16 | 12 | 6 | 34 |
| 2 | France (FRA) | 5 | 4 | 5 | 14 |
| 3 | Spain (ESP) | 2 | 0 | 3 | 5 |
| 4 | Netherlands (NED) | 1 | 2 | 3 | 6 |
| 5 | Germany (GER) | 0 | 4 | 4 | 8 |
| 6 | Belgium (BEL) | 0 | 1 | 2 | 3 |
| 7 | Sweden (SWE) | 0 | 1 | 1 | 2 |
| Totals (7 entries) | | 24 | 24 | 24 | 72 |

=== 2008 ===
* Host nation (Germany)

| Rank | Nation | Gold | Silver | Bronze | Total |
|---|---|---|---|---|---|
| 1 | France (FRA) | 10 | 9 | 3 | 22 |
| 2 | Italy (ITA) | 9 | 9 | 10 | 28 |
| 3 | Germany (GER) | 3 | 1 | 2 | 6 |
| 4 | Belgium (BEL) | 2 | 1 | 0 | 3 |
| 5 | Spain (ESP) | 0 | 2 | 4 | 6 |
| 6 | Netherlands (NED) | 0 | 2 | 3 | 5 |
| 7 | Portugal (POR) | 0 | 0 | 1 | 1 |
| 7 | Sweden (SWE) | 0 | 0 | 1 | 1 |
| Totals (8 entries) | | 24 | 24 | 24 | 72 |

=== 2009 ===
* Host nation (Belgium)

| Rank | Nation | Gold | Silver | Bronze | Total |
|---|---|---|---|---|---|
| 1 | Italy (ITA) | 12 | 7 | 7 | 26 |
| 2 | Belgium (BEL) | 7 | 2 | 3 | 12 |
| 3 | Germany (GER) | 4 | 4 | 6 | 14 |
| 4 | France (FRA) | 1 | 3 | 5 | 9 |
| 5 | Netherlands (NED) | 0 | 6 | 3 | 9 |
| 6 | Spain (ESP) | 0 | 2 | 0 | 2 |
| Totals (6 entries) | | 24 | 24 | 24 | 72 |

=== 2010 ===
* Host nation (Italy)

| Rank | Nation | Gold | Silver | Bronze | Total |
|---|---|---|---|---|---|
| 1 | Italy (ITA) | 11 | 10 | 8 | 29 |
| 2 | Belgium (BEL) | 5 | 1 | 0 | 6 |
| 3 | Germany (GER) | 4 | 4 | 6 | 14 |
| 4 | Netherlands (NED) | 2 | 6 | 3 | 11 |
| 5 | France (FRA) | 2 | 2 | 2 | 6 |
| 6 | Spain (ESP) | 0 | 0 | 4 | 4 |
| Totals (6 entries) | | 24 | 23 | 23 | 70 |

=== 2011 ===
| # | Country | Gold | Silver | Bronze | Total |
|---|---|---|---|---|---|
| 1 | Belgium | 7 | 0 | 0 | 7 |
| 2 | Netherlands | 4 | 6 | 5 | 15 |
| 3 | France | 4 | 6 | 5 | 15 |
| 4 | Germany | 4 | 6 | 4 | 14 |
| 5 | Italy | 3 | 6 | 7 | 16 |
| 6 | Spain | 2 | 0 | 3 | 5 |
| Total | | 24 | 24 | 24 | 72 |

=== 2012 ===
| # | Country | Gold | Silver | Bronze | Total |
|---|---|---|---|---|---|
| 1 | Italy | 9 | 4 | 4 | 17 |
| 2 | France | 1 | 4 | 1 | 6 |
| 3 | Netherlands | 1 | 2 | 4 | 7 |
| 4 | Belgium | 1 | 0 | 2 | 3 |
| 5 | Germany | 0 | 2 | 1 | 3 |
| Total | | 12 | 12 | 12 | 36 |

=== 2013 ===
| # | Country | Gold | Silver | Bronze | Total |
|---|---|---|---|---|---|
| 1 | Netherlands | 14 | 2 | 5 | 21 |
| 2 | Italy | 5 | 7 | 4 | 16 |
| 3 | Spain | 3 | 0 | 6 | 9 |
| 4 | Germany | 2 | 9 | 4 | 15 |
| 5 | Belgium | 1 | 1 | 0 | 2 |
| 6 | France | 0 | 7 | 5 | 12 |
| Total | | 25 | 26 | 24 | 75 |

=== 2014 ===
| # | Country | Gold | Silver | Bronze | Total |
|---|---|---|---|---|---|
| 1 | Italy | 6 | 7 | 5 | 18 |
| 2 | Germany | 5 | 6 | 6 | 17 |
| 3 | France | 4 | 4 | 6 | 14 |
| 4 | Belgium | 4 | 0 | 2 | 6 |
| 5 | Spain | 3 | 1 | 1 | 5 |
| 6 | Netherlands | 2 | 5 | 3 | 10 |
| 7 | Switzerland | 0 | 1 | 0 | 1 |
| 8 | Portugal | 0 | 0 | 1 | 1 |
| Total | | 24 | 24 | 24 | 72 |

=== 2015 ===
| # | Country | Gold | Silver | Bronze | Total |
|---|---|---|---|---|---|
| 1 | Italy | 10 | 6 | 5 | 21 |
| 2 | Austria | 5 | 0 | 0 | 5 |
| 3 | France | 4 | 5 | 6 | 15 |
| 4 | Belgium | 3 | 5 | 6 | 14 |
| 5 | Germany | 2 | 3 | 0 | 5 |
| 6 | Netherlands | 0 | 5 | 5 | 10 |
| 7 | Spain | 0 | 0 | 1 | 1 |
| 8 | Switzerland | 0 | 0 | 1 | 1 |
| Total | | 24 | 24 | 24 | 72 |

=== 2016 ===
| # | Country | Gold | Silver | Bronze | Total |
|---|---|---|---|---|---|
| 1 | Italy | 8 | 4 | 2 | 14 |
| 2 | Germany | 5 | 5 | 3 | 13 |
| 3 | Belgium | 4 | 6 | 1 | 11 |
| 4 | France | 4 | 3 | 10 | 17 |
| 5 | Netherlands | 2 | 3 | 6 | 11 |
| 6 | Spain | 1 | 2 | 2 | 5 |
| 7 | Austria | 0 | 1 | 0 | 1 |
| Total | | 24 | 24 | 24 | 72 |

=== 2017 ===
| # | Country | Gold | Silver | Bronze | Total |
|---|---|---|---|---|---|
| 1 | Italy | 8 | 5 | 7 | 20 |
| 2 | Belgium | 4 | 9 | 1 | 14 |
| 3 | France | 3 | 3 | 5 | 11 |
| 4 | Germany | 3 | 1 | 2 | 6 |
| 5 | Austria | 3 | 1 | 1 | 5 |
| 6 | Spain | 2 | 4 | 7 | 13 |
| 7 | Netherlands | 1 | 0 | 1 | 2 |
| 8 | Portugal | 0 | 1 | 0 | 1 |
| Total | | 24 | 24 | 24 | 72 |

=== 2018 ===
| # | Country | Gold | Silver | Bronze | Total |
|---|---|---|---|---|---|
| 1 | Italy | 8 | 7 | 1 | 16 |
| 2 | Belgium | 7 | 3 | 5 | 15 |
| 3 | Spain | 4 | 3 | 4 | 11 |
| 4 | Germany | 2 | 2 | 5 | 9 |
| 5 | France | 1 | 1 | 3 | 5 |
| 6 | Netherlands | 0 | 4 | 5 | 9 |
| 7 | Portugal | 0 | 3 | 1 | 4 |
| Total | | 22 | 23 | 24 | 69 |

=== 2019 ===
| # | Country | Gold | Silver | Bronze | Total |
|---|---|---|---|---|---|
| 1 | Italy | 8 | 7 | 6 | 21 |
| 2 | Belgium | 7 | 3 | 2 | 12 |
| 3 | Spain | 6 | 5 | 4 | 15 |
| 4 | France | 2 | 6 | 5 | 13 |
| 5 | Germany | 1 | 0 | 3 | 4 |
| 6 | Portugal | 0 | 2 | 3 | 5 |
| 7 | Netherlands | 0 | 1 | 1 | 2 |
| Total | | 24 | 24 | 24 | 72 |

=== 2021 ===
| # | Country | Gold | Silver | Bronze | Total |
|---|---|---|---|---|---|
| 1 | France | 11 | 7 | 4 | 22 |
| 2 | Italy | 6 | 4 | 9 | 19 |
| 3 | Portugal | 4 | 0 | 1 | 5 |
| 4 | Germany | 1 | 8 | 6 | 15 |
| 5 | Spain | 1 | 2 | 1 | 4 |
| 6 | Netherlands | 0 | 1 | 2 | 3 |
| 7 | Belgium | 0 | 1 | 0 | 1 |
| Total | | 23 | 23 | 23 | 69 |

=== 2022 ===
| Rank | Nation | Gold | Silver | Bronze | Total |
|---|---|---|---|---|---|
| 1 | France (FRA) | 7 | 9 | 7 | 23 |
| 2 | Italy (ITA) | 6 | 2 | 2 | 10 |
| 3 | Belgium (BEL) | 4 | 5 | 2 | 11 |
| 4 | Spain (ESP) | 4 | 3 | 1 | 8 |
| 5 | Netherlands (NED) | 1 | 0 | 2 | 3 |
| 6 | Germany (GER) | 0 | 2 | 3 | 5 |
| 7 | Austria (AUT) | 0 | 1 | 3 | 4 |
| 8 | Switzerland (SUI) | 0 | 0 | 2 | 2 |
| Totals (8 entries) | | 22 | 22 | 22 | 66 |

=== 2023 ===
* Host nation (France)

| Rank | Nation | Gold | Silver | Bronze | Total |
|---|---|---|---|---|---|
| 1 | France (FRA) | 16 | 10 | 7 | 33 |
| 2 | Italy (ITA) | 3 | 6 | 3 | 12 |
| 3 | Spain (ESP) | 1 | 1 | 5 | 7 |
| 4 | Germany (GER) | 0 | 1 | 3 | 4 |
| 5 | Belgium (BEL) | 0 | 1 | 2 | 3 |
| 6 | Portugal (POR) | 0 | 1 | 0 | 1 |
| Totals (6 entries) | | 20 | 20 | 20 | 60 |

=== 2024 ===
* Host nation (Belgium)

| Rank | Nation | Gold | Silver | Bronze | Total |
|---|---|---|---|---|---|
| 1 | France (FRA) | 8 | 9 | 7 | 24 |
| 2 | Italy (ITA) | 6 | 6 | 4 | 16 |
| 3 | Belgium (BEL) | 5 | 4 | 5 | 14 |
| 4 | Spain (ESP) | 3 | 2 | 4 | 9 |
| 5 | Germany (GER) | 0 | 1 | 1 | 2 |
| 6 | Netherlands (NED) | 0 | 0 | 1 | 1 |
| Totals (6 entries) | | 22 | 22 | 22 | 66 |

== Medals (1989-2019) ==
| Rank | Country | Gold | Silver | Bronze | Total |
|---|---|---|---|---|---|
| 1 | Italy | 434 | 306 | 217 | 929 |
| 2 | France | 164 | 185 | 205 | 532 |
| 3 | Spain | 70 | 101 | 120 | 285 |
| 4 | Belgium | 69 | 77 | 88 | 231 |
| 5 | Germany | 46 | 78 | 105 | 223 |
| 6 | Netherlands | 28 | 52 | 58 | 133 |
| 7 | Austria | 8 | 2 | 1 | 11 |
| 8 | Switzerland | 2 | 9 | 14 | 24 |
| 9 | United Kingdom | 1 | 2 | 2 | 5 |
| 10 | Portugal | 0 | 6 | 6 | 12 |

- https://www.roller-results.com/countries/
- https://www.roller-results.com/competitions/

== See also ==
- World Inline Cup Since 2000
- Inline Speed Skating World Championships Since 1937 Informal and 1989 Formal
- Inline Speed Skating World Junior Championships Since 1999

== Related Events ==
- European Artistic Roller Skating Championships
- European Freestyle Skating Championships
- Rink Hockey Men (Roller Hockey)
- Rink Hockey Women (Roller Hockey)
- European Inline Hockey Championships
- European Inline Alpine Championships
- European Inline Downhill Championships
- European Inline Freestyle Championships
- European Skateboarding Championships
- European Scootering Championships
- European Roller Derby Championships
- European Roller Freestyle Championships

== Other websites ==
- CERS Official Website
- Results
- https://www.britishskatinglegends.com/cadeteurochampionships.htm
- https://www.britishskatinglegends.com/junioraeurochampionships.htm
- https://www.britishskatinglegends.com/juniorbeurochampionships.htm
- https://www.britishskatinglegends.com/senioreurochampionships.htm
- https://www.britishskatinglegends.com/senior-men-euros
- https://www.britishskatinglegends.com/senior-women-euros
- https://www.britishskatinglegends.com/junior-jun-a-boys-euros
- https://www.britishskatinglegends.com/junior-jun-a-girls-euros
- https://www.britishskatinglegends.com/jun-b-youth-boys-euros
- https://www.britishskatinglegends.com/jun-b-youth-girl-euros
- https://www.britishskatinglegends.com/cadet-boys-euros
- https://www.britishskatinglegends.com/cadet-girls-euros
