= 2022 European Inline Speed Skating Championships =

- Venue: three locations around L'Aquila
- Location: L'Aquila, (Italy)
- Start date: 4 September 2022
- End date: 11 September 2022

The 33rd European Inline Speed Skating Championships were held in L'Aquila, Italy, from 4–11 September 2022. Organized by European Confederation of Roller Skating and Federazione Italiana Sport Rotellistici.

L'Aquila hosted the Europeans Inline Speed for the first time, taking place in three different venues;

- Pista Vesmaco di Santa Barbara for track events. Pista Vesmaco Santa Barbara
- Viale Corrado IV for marathon events. Viale Corrado IV
- L'Aquila–Preturo Airport for road events.

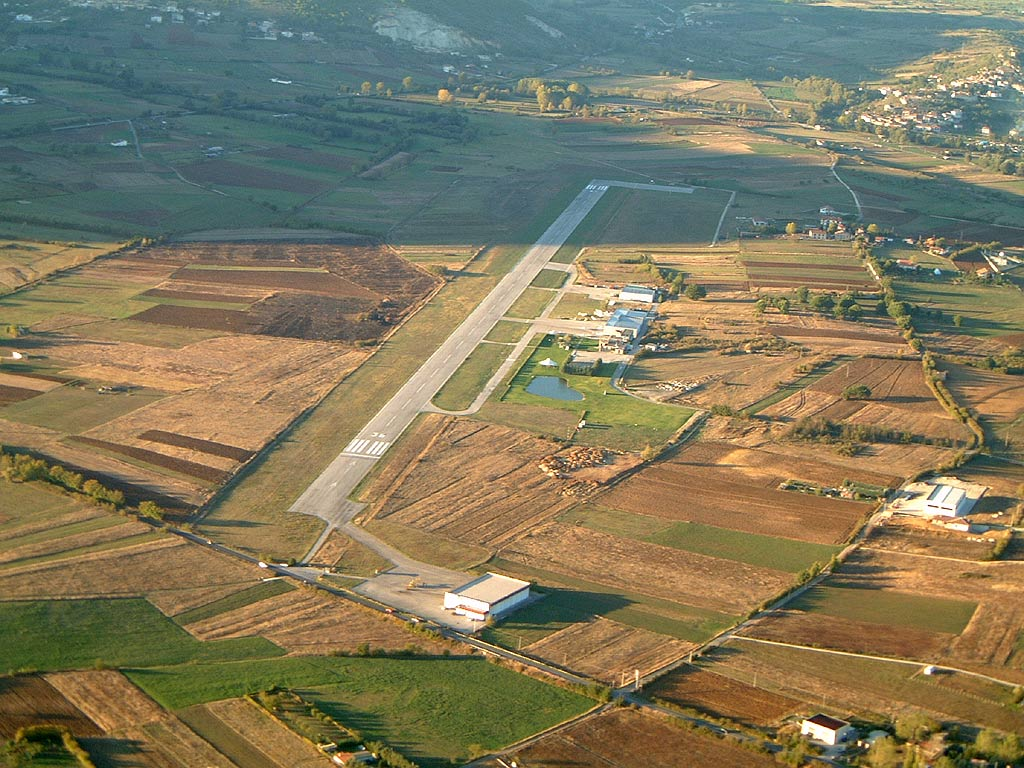
Preturo Airport, where the road events took place

Host country Italy topped the medal table with 50 medals including junior and youth events.

== Participating nations ==
16 nations entered the competition.

- Austria
- Belgium
- Czech Republic
- Denmark
- France
- Germany
- Great Britain
- Hungary
- Italy
- Latvia
- Netherlands
- Poland
- Portugal
- Spain
- Switzerland
- Ukraine

== Schedule ==
Times are Central European Summer Time (UTC+02:00)

=== Track ===
Date	Event	Time	Individual/Team
Sunday, September 4	200m Sprint	17:00	Individual
Sunday, September 4	10.000m points/elimination	19:00	Individual
Monday, September 5	10.000m eliminations	18:00	Individual
Monday, September 5	500m Sprint	21:00	Individual
Tuesday, September 6	1000m Sprint	18:00	Individual
Tuesday, September 6	3000m relay	19:00	Team

=== Road ===
Date	Event	Time	Individual/Team
Thursday, September 8	100m Sprint	17:00	Individual
Thursday, September 8	10.000m points	18:30	Individual
Friday, September 9	15.000m elimination	18:00	Individual
Friday, September 9	1-lap Sprint	20:00	Individual

=== Marathon ===
Date	Event	Time	Individual/Team
Sunday, September 11	42km	10:00	Ladies
Sunday, September 11	42km	11:30	Men's

== Medallists ==
Event	Gold		Silver		Bronze	
Track
Men's 200m sprint	Jhoan Guzmán (ESP)	16.934	Alessio Piergigli (ITA)	17.402	Yvan Sivilier (FRA)	17.459
Ladies 200m sprint	Asja Varani (ITA)	18.866	Mathilde Pédronno (FRA)	19.065	Vanessa Herzog (AUT)	19.123
Men's 10,000m pts/elim.	Bart Swings (BEL)	22 pts	Jason Suttels (BEL)	17 pts	Livio Wenger (SUI)	11 pts
Ladies 10,000m pts/elim.	Marine Lefeuvre (FRA)	14 pts.	Daniela Roldán (ESP)	9 pts.	Larissa Gaiser (GER)	8 pts.
Men's 10,000m elim.	Jason Suttels (BEL)	14.18.570	Bart Swings (BEL)	14.18.922	Livio Wenger (SUI)	14.19.364
Ladies 10,000m elim.	Alison Bernardi (FRA)	15.33.804	Marie Dupuy (FRA)	15.35.132	Marine Lefeuvre (FRA)	15.35.768
Men's 500m sprint	Duccio Marsili (ITA)	42.545	Elton de Souza (FRA)	42.626	Yvan Sivilier (FRA)	42.832
Ladies 500m sprint	Asja Varani (ITA)	46.525	Vanessa Herzog (AUT)	46.626	Mathilde Pédronno (FRA)	46.723
Men's 1,000m sprint	Jhoan Guzmán (ESP)	1.21.217	Valentin Thiébault (FRA)	1.21.425	Giuseppe Bramante (ITA)	1.21.566
Ladies 1,000m sprint	Veronica Luciani (ITA)	1.28.146	Marie Dupuy (FRA)	1.28.448	Vanessa Herzog (AUT)	1.28.624
Men's 3km relay	France; Valentin Thiébault; Yvan Sivilier; Martin Ferrié; Elton de Souza	3.57.293	Belgium; Bart Swings; Jason Suttels; Indra Médard	3.57.653	Italy; Duccio Marsili; Vincenzo Maiorca; Giuseppe Bramante	3.58.163
Ladies 3km relay	Italy; Asja Varani; Veronica Luciani; Luisa Woolaway; Melissa Gatti	4.15.303	Belgium; Anke Vos; Stien Vanhoutte; Fran Vanhoutte	4.15.353	France; Marine Lefeuvre; Manon Fraboulet; Alison Bernardi	4.15.380
Road
Men's 100m sprint	Jhoan Guzmán (ESP)	10.085	Ron Pucklitzsch (GER)	10.371	Jelmar Hempenius (NED)	10.438
Ladies 100m sprint	Asja Varani (ITA)	11.246	Almudena Blanco (ESP)	11.361	Vanessa Herzog (AUT)	11.476
Men's 10,000m points	Bart Swings (BEL)	53 points	Nolan Beddiaf (FRA)	13 points	Jason Suttels (BEL)	11 points
Ladies 10,000m points	Marine Balanant (FRA)	31 points	Angelina Otto (GER)	16 points	Fleur Veen (NED)	9 points
Men's 15,000m elim.	Bart Swings (BEL)	23.36.302	Nolan Beddiaf (FRA)	23.36.333	Jason Suttels (BEL)	23.45.155
Ladies 15,000m elim.	Marie Dupuy (FRA)		Marine Lefeuvre (FRA)		Alison Bernardi (FRA)	
Men's 1 Lap sprint	Jhoan Guzmán (ESP)	31.084	Duccio Marsili (ITA)	31.166	Nil Llop (ESP)	31.655
Ladies 1 Lap sprint	Mathilde Pédronno (FRA)	33.687	Luisa González (ESP)	33.786	Laethisia Schimek (GER)	33.952
Marathon
Men's marathon	Martin Ferrié (FRA)	1.01.38.718	Bart Swings (BEL)	1.01.38.750	Felix Rijhnen (GER)	1.01.38.948
Ladies marathon	Lianne van Loon (NED)	1.10.00.339	Marie Dupuy (FRA)	1.10.00.667	Marine Lefeuvre (FRA)	1.10.00.828

== Medal table ==
Rank	Nation	Gold	Silver	Bronze	Total
1	France (FRA)	7	9	7	23
2	Italy (ITA)	6	2	2	10
3	Belgium (BEL)	4	5	2	11
4	Spain (ESP)	4	3	1	8
5	Netherlands (NED)	1	0	2	3
6	Germany (GER)	0	2	3	5
7	Austria (AUT)	0	1	3	4
8	Switzerland (SUI)	0	0	2	2
Totals (8 entries)		22	22	22	66
