= 2014 European Inline Speed Skating Championships =

- Venue: Arena Geisingen
- Location: Geisingen, Germany
- Start date: July 28, 2014
- End date: August 3, 2014
- Competitors: 107 (71 men and 36 ladies) from 18 nations

The 26th European Inline Speed Skating Championships were held in Geisingen, Germany from July 28 to August 3, 2014. Organized by European Confederation of Roller Skating.

== Participating nations ==
19 nations entered the competition.

- Austria
- Belgium
- Croatia
- Czech Republic
- France
- Great Britain
- Germany
- Hungary
- Denmark
- Italy
- Portugal
- Poland
- Netherlands
- Norway
- Slovakia
- Slovenia
- Spain
- Sweden
- Switzerland

== Medallists ==
Event	Gold		Silver		Bronze	
Road
Men's 200 m Time Trial	Ioseba Fernández (ESP)	16.344	Ronald Mulder (NED)	16.527	Matthias Schwierz (GER)	16.734
Men's 500 m Sprint	Ioseba Fernández (ESP)	39.752	Gwendal Le Pivert (FRA)	39.852	Ronald Mulder (NED)	39.918
Men's 10,000 m Points Race	Francisco Peula (ESP)	16 pts. (13:09.666)	Fabio Francolini (ITA)	12 pts. (13:09.179 ER)	Ewen Fernandez (FRA)	12 pts. (13:19.166)
Men's 20,000 m Elimination Race	Bart Swings (BEL)	28:28.479	Fabio Francolini (ITA)	28:28.881	Ewen Fernandez (FRA)	28:29.030
Men's Marathon	Felix Rijhnen (GER)	1:04:27.631	Guillaume De Mallevoue (FRA)	1:05:11.360	Fabio Francolini (ITA)	1:06:29.875
Men's 5,000 m Relay	Belgium	6:39.634	Netherlands	6:39.982	Portugal	6:40.024
Women's 200 m Time Trial	Erika Zanetti (ITA)	18.274	Giulia Bongiorno (ITA)	18.340	Laethisia Schimek (GER)	18.530
Women's 500 m Sprint	Alisa Gutermuth (GER)	43.078	Laethisia Schimek (GER)	43.162	Erika Zanetti (ITA)	43.202
Women's 10,000 m Points Race	Francesca Lollobrigida (ITA)	14 pts. (15:12.893)	Manon Kamminga (NED)	14 pts. (15:17.491)	Mareike Thum (GER)	11 pts. (15:12.389)
Women's 20,000 m Elimination Race	Francesca Lollobrigida (ITA)	31:58.690	Sabine Berg (GER)	31:58.874	Manon Kamminga (NED)	31:59.060
Women's Marathon	Manon Kamminga (NED)	1:12:23.093	Francesca Lollobrigida (ITA)	1:12:23.420	Katharina Rumpus (GER)	1:12:23.578
Women's 5,000 m Relay	Germany	7:18.315	France	7:18.480	Italy	7:18.699
Track
Men's 300 m Time Trial	Darren De Souza (FRA)	23.538	Ioseba Fernández (ESP)	23.555	Nicolas Pelloquin (FRA)	23.758
Men's 500 m Sprint	Darren De Souza (FRA)	39.984	Matthias Schwierz (GER)	40.292	Niels Provoost (BEL)	40.495
Men's 1,000 m Sprint	Bart Swings (BEL)	1:18.665 (Qual. 1:17.431 ER)	Livio Wenger (SUI)	1:18.894	Gwendal Le Pivert (FRA)	1:18.919
Men's 10,000 m Points/Elimination Race	Alexis Contin (FRA)	15 pts. (13:46.488 ER)	Felix Rijhnen (GER)	15 pts. (13:48.654)	Bart Swings (BEL)	13 pts. (13:50.992)
Men's 15,000 m Elimination Race	Alexis Contin (FRA)	21:22.508 ER	Fabio Francolini (ITA)	21:22.660	Lorenzo Cassioli (ITA)	21:24.632
Men's 3,000 m Relay	Belgium	3:53.498	Germany	3:53.770	Netherlands	3:53.888
Women's 300 m Time Trial	Erika Zanetti (ITA)	25.889 (Qual. 25.839 ER)	Laethisia Schimek (GER)	25.992	Giulia Bongiorno (ITA)	26.032
Women's 500 m Sprint	Laethisia Schimek (GER)	42.175 ER	Erika Zanetti (ITA)	42.273	Alisa Gutermuth (GER)	42.332
Women's 1,000 m Sprint	Manon Kamminga (NED)	1:27.839	Erika Zanetti (ITA)	1:27.911 (Qual. 1:25.277 ER)	Mareike Thum (GER)	1:27.972
Women's 10,000 m Points/Elimination Race	Francesca Lollobrigida (ITA)	23 pts. (15:05.645)	Manon Kamminga (NED)	17 pts. (15:06.099)	Clemence Halbout (FRA)	7 pts. (15:11.572)
Women's 15,000 m Elimination Race	Francesca Lollobrigida (ITA)	23:48.049	Clemence Halbout (FRA)	23:48.544	Justine Halbout (FRA)	23:48.715
Women's 3,000 m Relay	Germany	4:08.551	Netherlands	4:10.321	Spain	4:11.119

== Senior Medal Table ==
Rank	Nation	Gold	Silver	Bronze	Total
1	Italy (ITA)	6	7	5	18
2	Germany (GER)	5	6	6	17
3	France (FRA)	4	4	6	14
4	Belgium (BEL)	4	0	2	6
5	Spain (ESP)	3	1	1	5
6	Netherlands (NED)	2	5	3	10
7	Switzerland (SUI)	0	1	0	1
8	Portugal (POR)	0	0	1	1
Totals (8 entries)		24	24	24	72
