= 2015 European Inline Speed Skating Championships =

- Location: Wörgl, Austria
- Start date: 20 July 2015
- End date: 26 July 2015

The 27th European Inline Speed Skating Championships were held in Wörgl, Austria, from 20 July to 26 July 2015. Organized by European Confederation of Roller Skating.

== Medallists ==
| Event | Gold | | Silver | | Bronze | |
|---|---|---|---|---|---|---|
Road
| Men's 200 m time trial | Simon Albrecht (GER) | 17.580 | Ronald Mulder (NED) | 17.892 | Edwin De Souza (FRA) | 17.944 |
| Men's 500 m sprint | Gwendal Le Pivert (FRA) | 42.664 | Andrea Angeletti (ITA) | 42.670 | Sargoni Danny (ITA) | 42.686 |
| Men's 10,000 m points race | Fabio Francolini (ITA) | 14 pts. | Bart Swings (BEL) | 10 pts. | Francisco Peula (ESP) | 8 pts. |
| Men's 20,000 m elimination race | Fabio Francolini (ITA) | 31:25.484 | Bart Swings (BEL) | 31:29.558 | Elton De Souza (FRA) | 31:24.144 (rr) |
| Men's marathon | Bart Swings (BEL) | 1:01:36.922 | Ewen Fernandez (FRA) | 1:02:07.874 | Nolan Beddiaf (FRA) | 1:02:14.264 |
| Men's relay | Italy | 7:08.108 | France | 7:08.229 | Netherlands | 7:08.985 |
| Women's 200 m time trial | Vanessa Bittner (AUT) | 19.335 | Giulia Bongiorno (ITA) | 19.407 | Erika Zanetti (ITA) | 19.420 |
| Women's 500 m sprint | Vanessa Bittner (AUT) | 45.405 | Erika Zanetti (ITA) | 45.724 | Giulia Bongiorno (ITA) | 45.885 |
| Women's 10,000 m points race | Francesca Lollobrigida (ITA) | 20 pts. | Manon Kamminga (NED) | 9 pts. | Sandrine Tas (BEL) | 8 pts. |
| Women's 20,000 m elimination race | Francesca Lollobrigida (ITA) | 34:50.259 | Manon Kamminga (NED) | 34:50.629 | Sandrine Tas (BEL) | 34:52.207 |
| Women's marathon | Francesca Lollobrigida (ITA) | 1:31:07.997 | Manon Kamminga (NED) | 1:31:08.052 | Sandrine Tas (BEL) | 1:31:08.492 |
| Women's relay | Italy | 7:42.540 | Germany | 7:43.188 | Netherlands | 7:43.485 |
Track
| Men's 300 m time trial | Simon Albrecht (GER) | 23.460 | Darren De Souza (FRA) | 23.553 | Ronald Mulder (NED) | 23.704 |
| Men's 500 m sprint | Elton De Souza (FRA) | 38.894 | Andrea Angeletti (ITA) | 39.237 | Darren De Souza (FRA) | 39.426 |
| Men's 1,000 m sprint | Bart Swings (BEL) | 1:19.466 | Alexis Contin (FRA) | 1:19.490 | Gwndal Le Pivert (FRA) | 1:19.534 |
| Men's 10,000 m points race | Bart Swings (BEL) | 16 pts. | Alexis Contin (FRA) | 13 pts. | Livio Wenger (SUI) | 6 pts. |
| Men's 15,000 m elimination race | Alexis Contin (FRA) | 21:11.750 | Bart Swings (BEL) | 21:11.768 | Elton De Souza (FRA) | 21:13.113 |
| Men's 3,000 m relay | France | | Italy | | Belgium | |
| Women's 300 m time trial | Vanessa Bittner (AUT) | 25.973 | Erika Zanetti (ITA) | 26.036 | Sandrine Tas (BEL) | 26.352 |
| Women's 500 m sprint | Vanessa Bittner (AUT) | 42.195 | Laethisia Schimek (GER) | 42.279 | Erika Zanetti (ITA) | 42.315 |
| Women's 1,000 m sprint | Vanessa Bittner (AUT) | 1:27.960 | Sandrine Tas (BEL) | 1:27.976 | Francesca Lollobrigida (ITA) | 1:28.205 |
| Women's 10,000 m points race | Francesca Lollobrigida (ITA) | 24 pts. | Sandrine Tas (BEL) | 11 pts. | Manon Kamminga (NED) | 11 pts. |
| Women's 15,000 m elimination race | Francesca Lollobrigida (ITA) | 23:44.209 | Manon Kamminga (NED) | 23:44.236 | Sandrine Tas (BEL) | 23:46.423 |
| Women's 3,000 m relay | Italy | | Germany | | Netherlands | |

== Medal table ==
| Rank | Nation | Gold | Silver | Bronze | Total |
|---|---|---|---|---|---|
| 1 | Italy (ITA) | 10 | 6 | 5 | 21 |
| 2 | Austria (AUT) | 5 | 0 | 0 | 5 |
| 3 | France (FRA) | 4 | 5 | 6 | 15 |
| 4 | Belgium (BEL) | 3 | 5 | 6 | 14 |
| 5 | Germany (GER) | 2 | 3 | 0 | 5 |
| 6 | Netherlands (NED) | 0 | 5 | 5 | 10 |
| 7 | Spain (ESP) | 0 | 0 | 1 | 1 |
| 7 | Switzerland (SUI) | 0 | 0 | 1 | 1 |
| Totals (8 entries) | | 24 | 24 | 24 | 72 |

== Total Medal Table (Senior, Junior A and Junior B) ==
| Rank | Nation | Gold | Silver | Bronze | Total |
|---|---|---|---|---|---|
| 1 | Italy (ITA) | 33 | 24 | 19 | 76 |
| 2 | France (FRA) | 16 | 16 | 19 | 51 |
| 3 | Belgium (BEL) | 8 | 8 | 7 | 23 |
| 4 | Austria (AUT) | 5 | 0 | 0 | 5 |
| 5 | Germany (GER) | 4 | 9 | 6 | 19 |
| 6 | Denmark (DEN) | 3 | 1 | 2 | 6 |
| 7 | Spain (ESP) | 1 | 6 | 4 | 11 |
| 8 | Netherlands (NED) | 0 | 6 | 13 | 19 |
| 9 | Portugal (POR) | 0 | 0 | 1 | 1 |
| 9 | Switzerland (SUI) | 0 | 0 | 1 | 1 |
| Totals (10 entries) | | 70 | 70 | 72 | 212 |
