= 2021 European Inline Speed Skating Championships =

- Venue: Complexo Desportivo do Arsenal que era de Canelas
- Location: Canelas, Estarreja, (Portugal)
- Start date: 18 July 2021
- End date: 25 July 2021

The 32nd European Inline Speed Skating Championships were held in Canelas, Portugal, from 18 – 25 July 2021. Organized by European Confederation of Roller Skating and Federação Portuguesa de Patinagem.

== Venues ==
Track & Road		Marathon circuit	
Canelas, Portugal	2021 European Inline Speed Skating Championships is located in Portugal	Estarreja, Portugal	2021 European Inline Speed Skating Championships is located in Portugal
Complexo Desportivo Arsenal que era de Canelas	2021 European Inline Speed Skating Championships is located in Portugal	EcoParque Empresarial de Estarreja	2021 European Inline Speed Skating Championships is located in Portugal
Capacity: 600	2021 European Inline Speed Skating Championships is located in Portugal	Capacity: n/a	2021 European Inline Speed Skating Championships is located in Portugal

== Schedule ==
Times are Western European Summer Time (UTC+01:00)

=== Track ===
Date	Event	Time	Individual/Team
Monday, July 19	200m Sprint	17:00	Individual
Monday, July 19	10.000m points/elimination	19:00	Individual
Monday, July 19	500m Sprint	following	Mixed Team
Tuesday, July 20	10.000m eliminations	17:00	Individual
Tuesday, July 20	500m Sprint	21:00	Individual
Wednesday, July 21	1000m Sprint	18:00	Individual
Wednesday, July 21	3000m relay	19:00	Team

=== Road ===
Date	Event	Time	Individual/Team
Friday, July 23	100m Sprint	17:00	Individual
Friday, July 23	10.000m points	18:30	Individual
Saturday, July 24	1-lap Sprint	16:00	Individual
Saturday, July 24	15.000m elimination	17:00	Individual

=== Marathon ===
Date	Event	Time	Individual/Team
Sunday, July 25	42km	09:30	Ladies
Sunday, July 25	42km	11:00	Men's

== Medallists ==
Event	Gold		Silver		Bronze	
Track
Men's 200m sprint	Duccio Marsili (ITA)	17.459	Gwendal Le Pivert (FRA)	17.547	Simon Albrecht (GER)	17.657
Ladies 200m sprint	Mathilde Pédronno (FRA)	18.901	Laethisia Schimek (GER)	19.131	Asja Varani (ITA)	19.277
Men's 10,000m pts/elim.	Diogo Marreiros (POR)	19 pts	Martin Ferrié (FRA)	16 pts	Felix Rijhnen (GER)	12 pts
Ladies 10,000m pts/elim.	Linda Rossi (ITA)	22 pts.	Marine Lefeuvre (FRA)	13 pts.	Josie Hofmann (GER)	12 pts.
500m Mixed Team	France; Valentin Thiebault; Alison Bernardi	43.386	Netherlands; Rémon Kwant; Lianne van Loon	43.562	Germany; Camilo Acosta; Josie Hofmann	43.780
Men's 10,000m elim.	Diogo Marreiros (POR)	16:02.909	Jason Suttels (BEL)	16:03.464	Martin Ferrié (FRA)	16:03.768
Ladies 10,000m elim.	Linda Rossi (ITA)	16:53.161	Marine Lefeuvre (FRA)	16:53.195	Marie Dupuy (FRA)	16:55.149
Men's 500m sprint	Gwendal Le Pivert (FRA)	43.193	Simon Albrecht (GER)	43.297	Duccio Marsili (ITA)	43.332
Ladies 500m sprint	Mathilde Pédronno (FRA)	46.525	Laethisia Schimek (GER)	46.626	Linda Rossi (ITA)	46.723
Men's 1,000m sprint	Duccio Marsili (ITA)	1:22.676	Gwendal Le Pivert (FRA)	1:22.529	Giuseppe Bramante (ITA)	1:12.529 (rr)
Ladies 1,000m sprint	Marie Dupuy (FRA)	1:28.891	Laethisia Schimek (GER)	1:29.329	Ana Humanes (ESP)	1:29.400
Men's 3km relay	Italy; Giuseppe Bramante; Duccio Marsili; Daniele di Stefano; Danny Sargoni	4:02.654	Spain; Nil Llop; Francisco Peula; Rafael Heredia; Daniel Milagros	4:02.919	Netherlands; Rémon Kwant; Luc ter Haar; Marc Middelkoop; Ruurd Dijkstra	4:03.369
Ladies 3km relay	Germany; Josie Hofmann; Larissa Gaiser; Angelina Otto; Laethisia Schimek	4:21.158	France; Mathilde Pédronno; Marine Lefeuvre; Marie Dupuy; Alison Bernardi	4:21.191	Italy; Linda Rossi; Giorgia Bormida; Luisa Woolaway; Asja Varani	4:21.340
Road
Men's 100m sprint	Ioseba Fernández (ESP)	09.956	Vincenzo Maiorca (ITA)	10.078	João Afonso (POR)	10.106
Ladies 100m sprint	Mathilde Pédronno (FRA)	10.627	Alice Fracassetto (ITA)	10.715	Maëlle Laune (FRA)	10.730
Men's 10,000m points	Diogo Marreiros (POR)	20 points	Francisco Peula (ESP)	17 points	Nolan Beddiaf (FRA)	12 points
Ladies 10,000m points	Marine Lefeuvre (FRA)	19 points	Josie Hofmann (GER)	12 points	Federica di Natale (ITA)	8 points
Men's 1 Lap sprint	Duccio Marsili (ITA)	30.499	Yvan Sivilier (FRA)	30.745	Rémon Kwant (NED)	30.968
Ladies 1 Lap sprint	Mathilde Pédronno (FRA)	33.687	Laethisia Schimek (GER)	33.786	Linda Rossi (ITA)	33.952
Men's 15,000m elim.	Diogo Marreiros (POR)	22:10.928	Giuseppe Bramante (ITA)	22:11.592	Daniele di Stefano (ITA)	22:11.741
Ladies 15,000m elim.	Marie Dupuy (FRA)	24:31.182	Josie Hofmann (GER)	24:31.314	Linda Rossi (ITA)	24:31.498
Marathon
Men's marathon	Nolan Beddiaf (FRA)	1:01:56.852	Daniele di Stefano (ITA)	1:01:57.235	Felix Rijhnen (GER)	1:01:57.404
Ladies marathon	Marine Lefeuvre (FRA)	1:12:36.910	Josie Hofmann (GER)	1:12:37.182	Katharina Rumpus (GER)	1:12:37.521

== Medal table ==
Rank	Nation	Gold	Silver	Bronze	Total
1	France (FRA)	11	7	4	22
2	Italy (ITA)	6	4	9	19
3	Portugal (POR)	4	0	1	5
4	Germany (GER)	1	8	6	15
5	Spain (ESP)	1	2	1	4
6	Netherlands (NED)	0	1	2	3
7	Belgium (BEL)	0	1	0	1
Totals (7 entries)		23	23	23	69
