= 2011 World Freestyle Skating Championships =

- Venue: Arena
- Location: Geisingen, Germany
- Start date: October 21, 2011
- End date: October 23, 2011

The 5th World Freestyle Skating Championships were held in Geisingen, Germany from October 21 to October 23, 2011. 27 countries took part in the competition.

== Medal table ==
Rank	Nation	Gold	Silver	Bronze	Total
1	China (CHN)	8	7	3	18
2	France (FRA)	2	1	2	5
3	Italy (ITA)	1	2	2	5
4	Singapore (SIN)	1	1	0	2
5	South Korea (KOR)	1	0	2	3
6	Russia (RUS)	0	1	3	4
7	Poland (POL)	0	1	0	1
8	Chinese Taipei (TPE)	0	0	1	1
Totals (8 entries)		13	13	13	39
