= 2018 European Artistic Roller Skating Championships =

- Venue: Escola Secundária da Lagoa
- Location: Lagoa, Portugal
- Start date: August 31, 2018
- End date: September 4, 2018
- Nations: 13

The 2018 European Artistic Roller Skating Championships were held in Lagoa, Portugal from August 31 to September 4, 2018. Organized by European Confederation of Roller Skating and Federação Portuguesa de Patinagem, the event took place at the Escola Secundária da Lagoa pavilhão with 960-seats capacity.

== Participating nations ==
13 nations entered the competition.

- Denmark
- Germany
- Great Britain
- France
- Israel
- Italy
- Netherlands
- Portugal
- Slovenia
- Spain
- Romania
- Russia
- Switzerland

== Medallists ==
Event	Gold	Silver	Bronze
Women's Compulsory Figures	Lina Goncharenko (GER)	Elena Donadelli (ITA)	Chiara Trentini (ITA)
Men's Compulsory Figures	Alessio Gangi (ITA)	Tim Jendricke (GER)	Aaron Wunder (GER)
Couple Dance	Portugal; Pedro Walgode; Ana Walgode	Portugal; José Cruz; Daniela Dias	Italy; Antonelli Massimiliano; Camilla Barguino
Women's Free Skating	Micol Zangoli (ITA)	Michela Cima (ITA)	Carla Escrich (ESP)
Men's Free Skating	Pere Marsinyach (ESP)	Michele Sica (ITA)	Marco Giustino (ITA)
Pairs Skating	Italy; Alessandro Fratalocchi; Alessia Gambardella	France; Thomas Picard; Camélia Chérifi	Spain; Artur Balagué; Elisenda Prat
Women's Solo Dance	Rachele Campagnol (ITA)	Ana Walgode (POR)	Anna Remondini (ITA)
Men's Solo Dance	Ricardo Pinto (POR)	Pedro Walgode (POR)	Andrea Bassi (ITA)

== Medal table ==
Rank	Nation	Gold	Silver	Bronze	Total
1	Italy (ITA)	4	3	5	12
2	Portugal (POR)	2	3	0	5
3	Germany (GER)	1	1	1	3
4	Spain (ESP)	1	0	2	3
5	France (FRA)	0	1	0	1
Totals (5 entries)		8	8	8	24
