= 2014 European Artistic Roller Skating Championships =

- Location: Roccaraso, Italy
- Start date: August 31, 2014
- End date: September 5, 2014
- Nations: 10

The 2014 European Artistic Roller Skating Championships were held in Roccaraso, Italy from August 31 to September 5, 2014. Organized by European Confederation of Roller Skating.

== Participating nations ==
10 nations entered the competition.

- France
- Great Britain
- Germany
- Israel
- Italy
- Portugal
- Netherlands
- Slovenia
- Spain
- Switzerland

== Medallists ==
Even	Gold	Silver	Bronze
Women's Compulsory Dances	Dalila Laneve (ITA)	Anna Remondini (ITA)	Cinzia Roana (ITA)
Women's Compulsory Figures	Beatrice Wachter (GER)	Valeria Barossi (ITA)	Cristina Berti (ITA)
Women's Solo Dance	Anna Remondini (ITA)	Dalila Laneve (ITA)	Cinzia Roana (ITA)
Men's Compulsory Dances	Ricardo Pinto (POR)	Andrea Bassi (ITA)	Paulo Santos (POR)
Men's Compulsory Figures	Andrea Poli (ITA)	Francesco Tonini (ITA)	Pierre Meriel (FRA)
Men's Solo Dance	Ricardo Pinto (POR)	Andrea Bassi (ITA)	Paulo Santos (POR)
Pair Dances	Italy; Matteo Fraschini; Dalila Laneve	Italy; Simone Cellarosi; Valentina Carrafiello	Italy; Gregorio Mazzini; Georgia Nanni
Men's Free Skating	Andrea Girotto (ITA)	David Mariano Malagon (ESP)	Kevin Bordas Li (ESP)
Women's Free Skating	Lucija Mlinaric (SLO)	Annalisa Graziosi (ITA)	Chiara Colpo (ITA)
Pairs Skating	Italy; Andrea Laurenzi; Federica Vico	Italy; Angelo de Bendictis; Veronica Saltalippi	France; Nathanael Fouly; Marine Portet
