= Oliver Martin =

Oliver Martin may refer to:

- Oliver Óge Martyn, Irish Jacobite and landowner
- Oliver Martin (cyclist) (born 1946), American cyclist
- Oliver Martin (skater), British figure skater and artistic roller skater
- Oliver Martin (snowboarder) (born 2008), American snowboarder
