= 2021 European Artistic Roller Skating Championships =

- Venue: Playhall di Riccione
- Location: Riccione, Italy
- Start date: September 3, 2021
- End date: September 11, 2021
- Nations: 14

The 2021 European Artistic Roller Skating Championships were held in Riccione, Italy from September 3 – 11, 2021. Organized by European Confederation of Roller Skating and Federazione Italiana Sport Rotellistici, the event took place at the playhall Arena with 1,500-seats capacity.

== Venue ==
Playhall di Riccione
| Riccione, Italy | 2021 European Artistic Roller Skating Championships is located in Italy |
| playhall | 2021 European Artistic Roller Skating Championships is located in Italy |
| Capacity: 1,572 | 2021 European Artistic Roller Skating Championships is located in Italy |

== Participating nations ==
14 nations entered the competition.

- Belgium
- Croatia
- Czech Republic
- Denmark
- France
- Germany
- Israel
- Italy
- Netherlands
- Portugal
- Russia
- Slovenia
- Spain
- Switzerland

== Medallists ==
| Event | Gold | Silver | Bronze |
|---|---|---|---|
| Women's Compulsory Figures | Alina de Silva (GER) | Chiara Trentini (ITA) | Desiree Cocchi (ITA) |
| Men's Compulsory Figures | Mirco Schiavoni (ITA) | Luca Innocenti (ITA) | Federico Trento (ITA) |
| Women's Inline Skating | Anna Semisynova (RUS) | Séréna Giraud (FRA) | Zoe Cattarin (ITA) |
| Men's Inline Skating | Antonio Panfili (ITA) | Àlex Ilici (ESP) | (25x17px) |
| Pairs Skating | Italy; Alice Esposito; Federico Rossi | Italy; Micol Mills; Tommaso Cortini | Italy; Caterina Locuratolo; Aldo Rrapushi |
| Couple Dance | Italy; Rachele Campagnol; Mattia Qualizza | Italy; Asya Sofia Testoni; Giovanni Piccolantonio | Portugal; Ana Walgode; Pedro Walgode |
| Women's Free Skating | Rebecca Tarlazzi (ITA) | Letizia Ghiroldi (ITA) | Andrea Silva (ESP) |
| Men's Free Skating | Pau García Domec (ESP) | Luca Lucaroni (ITA) | Pere Marsinyach (ESP) |
| Women's Solo Dance | Natalia Baldizzone (ESP) | Asya Sofia Testoni (ITA) | Emilia Zimermann (GER) |
| Men's Solo Dance | Llorenç Àlvarez (ESP) | Mattia Qualizza (ITA) | Pedro Walgode (POR) |

== Medal table ==
| Rank | Nation | Gold | Silver | Bronze | Total |
|---|---|---|---|---|---|
| 1 | Italy (ITA) | 5 | 8 | 4 | 17 |
| 2 | Spain (ESP) | 3 | 1 | 2 | 6 |
| 3 | Germany (GER) | 1 | 0 | 1 | 2 |
| 4 | Russia (RUS) | 1 | 0 | 0 | 1 |
| 5 | France (FRA) | 0 | 1 | 0 | 1 |
| 6 | Portugal (POR) | 0 | 0 | 2 | 2 |
| Totals (6 entries) | | 10 | 10 | 9 | 29 |
