= Oliver Martin (skater) =

British figure skater

Oliver James Martin is a British figure skater who also competes in artistic roller skating. He has won British Championship titles including Senior Men's Solo-Dance for Artistic Roller Skating, and Junior Men's Solo-Dance for Figure Skating. Oliver was ranked 9th in the 2018 World Artistic Roller Skating Championships held in La Vendée, France.

== International ranking ==
Year	Competition	Category	Ranking
2018	World Artistic Roller Skating Championships	Senior Men's Solo-Dance	9
2018	European Artistic Roller Skating Championships	Senior Men's Solo-Dance	9
2017	European Artistic Roller Skating Championships	Junior Men's Solo-Dance	7

== National ranking ==
Year	Competition	Category	Ranking
2018	British Artistic Roller Skating Championships	Senior Men's Solo-Dance	1
2018	British Solo Ice Dance Championships	Junior Men's Solo-Dance	1
2017	British Artistic Roller Skating Championships	Junior Men's Solo-Dance	1
