= European Freestyle Skating Championships =

International roller skating competition

The European Freestyle Skating Championships is the main freestyle skating championships in Europe, organized by World Skate Europe.

== Summary of Championships ==
Year	City	Country	Date	Venue	No. of Athletes
2015	Busto Arsizio	Italy	24–27 September		141
2016	Ciudad Real	Spain	6–9 October	Quijote Arena	
2017	Busto Arsizio	Italy	5–8 October		
2018	Barcelona	Spain	28–30 September	Fira Gran Vía	
2021	Valladolid	Spain	16–19 December	Pabellón Pilar Fernández Valderrama	
2023	Ciudad Real	Spain	1–3 September	Quijote Arena	
