= 2022 European Artistic Roller Skating Championships =

- Venue: Poliesportiu d'Andorra
- Location: Andorra la Vella, Andorra
- Start date: August 31, 2022
- End date: September 10, 2022
- Nations: 14

The 2022 European Artistic Roller Skating Championships were held in Andorra la Vella, Andorra from August 31 – September 10, 2022. Jointly organized by the Federació Andorrana de Patinatge and Real Federación Española de Patinaje, the 11-days championship took place at the Poliesportiu d'Andorra with 5,000-seats capacity.

== Venue ==
Poliesportiu d'Andorra
| Andorra la Vella, Andorra | 2022 European Artistic Roller Skating Championships is located in Andorra |
| Poliesportiu d'Andorra | 2022 European Artistic Roller Skating Championships is located in Andorra |
Capacity: 5,000

== Participating nations ==
17 nations entered the competition.

- Belgium
- Denmark
- France
- Germany
- United Kingdom
- Israel
- Italy
- Netherlands
- Poland
- Portugal
- Slovenia
- Spain
- Switzerland
- Romania
- Croatia
- Andorra
- Czech Republic

== Medallists ==
| Event | Gold | Silver | Bronze |
|---|---|---|---|
| Senior Men's Free Skating | Héctor Díez (ESP) | Alessandro Liberatore (ITA) | Diogo Craveiro (POR) |
| Senior Ladies Free Skating | Giada Luppi (ITA) | Carla Escrich (ESP) | Claudia Aguado (ESP) |
| Men's Inline Skating | Antonio Panfili (ITA) | Àlex Ilici (ESP) | (25x17px) |
| Ladies Inline Skating | Sofia Paronetto (ITA) | Metka Kuk (ITA) | Nonaya Cuervo (ESP) |
| Pairs Skating | Italy; Micol Mills; Tommaso Cortini | Italy; Alice Piazzi; Alessandro Bozzini | Italy; Caterina Locuratolo; Aldo Rrapushi |
| Senior Men's Solo Dance | Llorenç Àlvarez (ESP) | Raoul Allegranti (ITA) | Giorgio Casella (ITA) |
| Senior Ladies Solo Dance | Natalia Baldizzone (ESP) | Martina Nuti (ITA) | Carolina Gomes (POR) |
| Junior Men's Free Skating | Lucas Perez (ESP) | Aleix Bou (ESP) | Arnau Perez (ESP) |
| Junior Ladies Free Skating | Sira Bella (ESP) | Anouk Vizcarro (ESP) | (_) |
| Junior Men's Solo Dance | Gherardo Altieri (ITA) | Ot Font (ESP) | Diogo Costa (POR) |
| Ladies Solo Dance | Roberta Sasso (ITA) | Lidia Mateo (ESP) | Catarina Craveiro (POR) |
| Senior Couple's Dance | Portugal; Ana Walgode; Pedro Walgode | Italy; Caterina Artoni; Raoul Allegranti | Italy; Ilaria Golluscio; Samuele Stasi |
| Junior Couple's Dance | Italy; Roberta Sasso; Gherardo Altieri | Spain; Lidia Mateo; Manuel Delgado | Portugal; Andreia Oliveira; Diogo Costa |

== Medal table ==
| Rank | Nation | Gold | Silver | Bronze | Total |
|---|---|---|---|---|---|
| 1 | Italy (ITA) | 12 | 18 | 14 | 44 |
| 2 | Spain (ESP) | 12 | 10 | 5 | 27 |
| 3 | Portugal (POR) | 5 | 2 | 7 | 14 |
| 4 | Netherlands (NED) | 1 | 0 | 0 | 1 |
| Totals (4 entries) | | 30 | 30 | 26 | 86 |
