= Elton de Souza (speed skater) =

French inline speed skater

Personal information
- Full name: Elton de Souza
- Nationality: France
- Born: 23 March 1991 (age 35) Lyon, France
- Height: 1.67 m (5 ft 5 1/2 in)
- Weight: 62 kg (137 lb)

Sport
- Sport: Roller speed skating
Medal record
Men's inline speed skating
Representing France
World Games
Gold medal – first place	2017 Wrocław	15 km elimination
Bronze medal – third place	2017 Wrocław	1000 m sprint

Elton de Souza (born 23 March 1991) is a French inline speed skater. A member of the French national roller skating team since 2003, he competes internationally in indoor track and road racing championships. He is a double world champion in the relay and a World Games gold medallist in the 15 km elimination race.

== Biography ==
Elton de Souza began roller skating at a very young age, around the age of 3. His father, Terrance Anthony de Souza, serves as the coach for the entire family; his older brother Edwin de Souza and younger brother Darren de Souza also compete at a high international level in speed skating.

At age 10, de Souza won two bronze medals at the French Championships in the Poussins category. He joined the French national team at 12, and, at just 14 years old, he secured his first European champion title. Holding an official coaching license, he offers training camps for various clubs while continuing to be coached by his father.

== Career Achievements ==
Throughout his career, Elton de Souza has earned 27 French championship titles, 8 European championship titles, and 12 World Championship medals (including two gold medals in relays). He is also a World Games champion, winning the 15 km elimination race at the 2017 World Games in Wrocław after he decided to follow Felix Rijhnen's early sprint attack, coasting behind him for much of the race to conserve energy before rejoining the rear of the peloton with Rijhnen; de Souza made his winning move near the end of the race to overtake Rijhnen, and the chase group behind were unable to make up the distance. He also won a bronze medal in the 1,000 m sprint at the same Games.

Additional notable international victories include wins in Germany, Belgium, and Colombia:

- 2013: Won the Rollathlon, a 103 km roller marathon, finishing in 3h03:52.3 ahead of teammate Aurélien Roumagnac.
- 2014: Won the French Indoor Championships general classification as well as the 20 km road elimination race.
- 2015: Secured a second consecutive victory at the International Arena Geisingen in Germany and won the Trois Routes competition.

=== Major International Results ===
==== 2015 World Championships (Kaohsiung, Taiwan) ====
- Silver 3000 m American track relay (with Ewen Fernandez and Alexis Contin)
- Bronze Marathon

==== 2015 European Championships (Wörgl & Innsbruck, Austria) ====
- Gold Men's individual overall ranking
- Gold 3000 m American track relay (with Alexis Contin, Darren de Souza, and Gwendal le Pivert)
- Gold 500 m track sprint
- Bronze 20,000 m road elimination
- Bronze 15,000 m track elimination

==== 2014 World Championships (Rosario, Argentina) ====
- Bronze Track sprint
- Bronze Marathon
