= Freestyle skating =

Freestyle skating may refer to:

- Artistic roller free skating
- Freestyle inline skating
