= European Artistic Roller Skating Championships =

Artistic roller skating championships

The European Artistic Roller Skating Championships is the main artistic roller skating championships in Europe, organized by European Confederation of Roller Skating.

== Summary of Championships ==
The list is incomplete

Year	City	Country	Date	Venue	No. of Athletes	Top of Medal Table (Country)
2007	Gujan-Mestras	France	July 30 – August 5			
2008	Fuengirola	Spain	September 22 – 27			
2009	Nazaré	Portugal				
2010	Barcelona	Spain	August 20 – 29			
2011	Reggio Calabria	Italy				
2012	Arnas	France	August 27 – September 1			
2013	Porto Salvo	Portugal	September 16 – 23	Porto Salvo Recreation Club Sports Hall		
2014	Roccaraso	Italy	August 31 – September 5			Italy
2015	Ponte di Legno	Italy	August 25 – September 1			
2016	Freiburg	Germany	August 31 – September 3			
2017	Roana–Asiago	Italy	July 29 – August 5			
2018	Lagoa	Portugal	August 31 – September 8	Escola Secundária da Lagoa		Italy
2019	Harsefeld	Germany	August 31 – September 7	Icesport Arena		
2021	Riccione	Italy	September 3 – 11	Playhall		Italy
2022	Andorra la Vella	Andorra	August 31 – September 10	Poliesportiu d'Andorra		Italy
2023	Ponte di Legno	Italy	August 30 – September 10	Palazzetto dello Sport		
2024	Fafe	Portugal	July 21 – 31	Pavilhão Multiusos de Fafe		
2025	Trieste	Italy	September 2 – 13			
2026	Ponte di Legno	Italy	September 3 – 12	Palazzetto dello Sport		Italy
