= Geisingen =

- Town
- Coat of arms

- Location of Geisingen within Tuttlingen district
- Interactive map of Geisingen
- Location within Germany Location within Baden-Württemberg
- Coordinates: 47°55′20″N 08°38′47″E
- Country: Germany
- State: Baden-Württemberg
- Admin. region: Freiburg
- District: Tuttlingen

Government
  - Mayor (2019–27): Martin Numberger

Area
  - Total: 73.75 km^{2} (28.48 sq mi)
- Elevation: 667 m (2,188 ft)

Population (2025-12-31)
  - Total: 6,166
  - Density: 83.61/km^{2} (216.5/sq mi)
- Time zone: UTC+01:00 (CET)
  - Summer (DST): UTC+02:00 (CEST)
- Postal codes: 78187
- Dialling codes: 07704
- Vehicle registration: TUT
- Website: www.geisingen.de

Geisingen (German pronunciation: [ˈɡaɪzɪŋən]) is a town in the district of Tuttlingen, in Baden-Württemberg, Germany. It is situated on the Danube, 13 km southwest of Tuttlingen, and 21 km southeast of Villingen-Schwenningen.

== History ==
Geisingen is referenced (spelled variously as 'Chisincs' and 'Gisinga') in deeds dated in the years 724 and 829 recorded in the monastery of St. Gallen, Switzerland, and as such is attested as one of the oldest towns in the region.

== Geography ==
The town is on the left (here, the northern) bank of the Danube at the eastern edge of a plateau known as the Baar. Where the valley of the Danube leads out of town to the east, the altitude is 2162 feet. From the peak of the Wartenberg, a conical hill (altitude: 2756 feet) which overlooks the town from the west, one can on a clear day catch a glimpse of the Swiss alps.

Aulfingen, church: Kirche Sankt Nikolaus

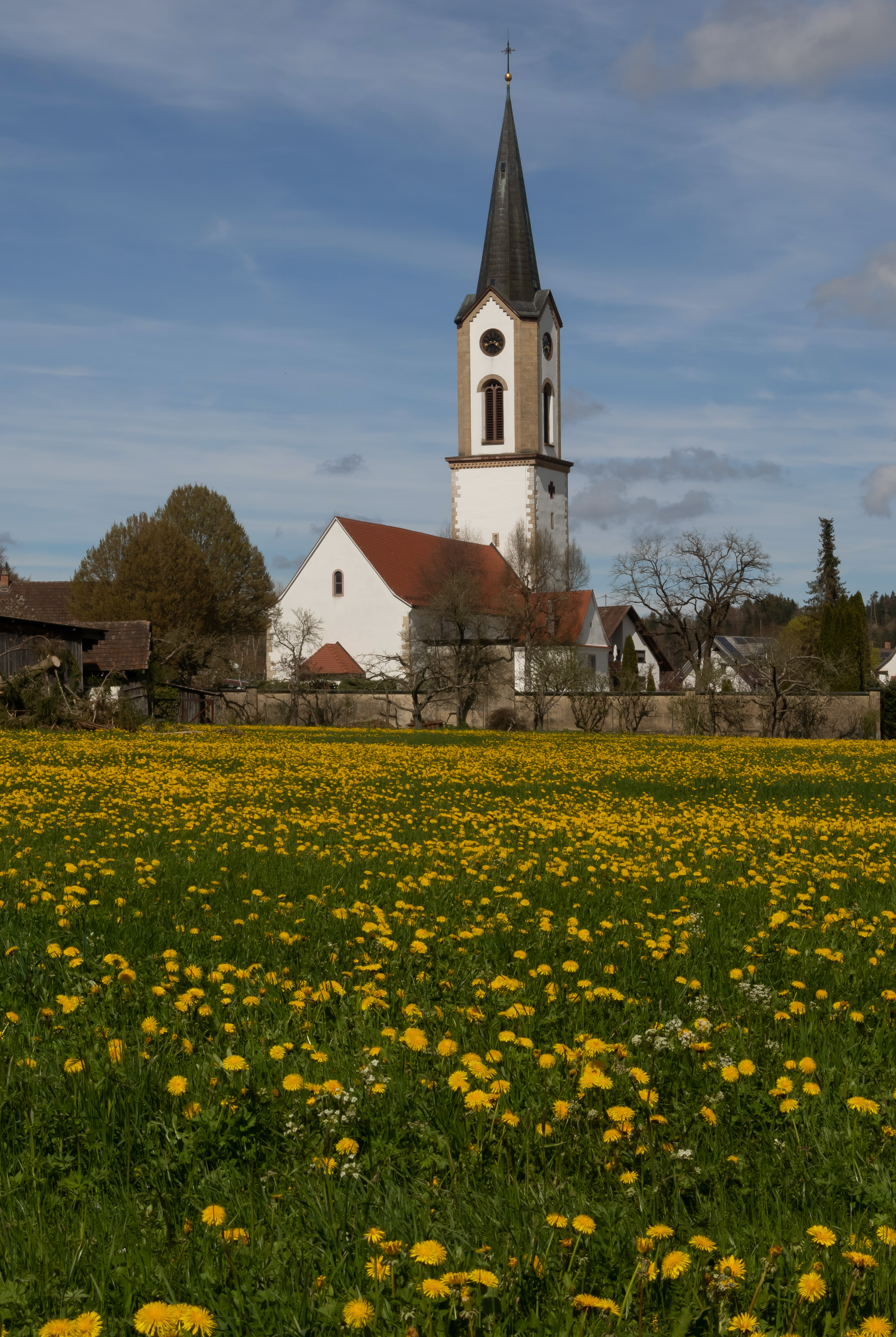
Kirchen Hausen, church: Pfarrkirche Sankt Marien

== Notable people ==
- Gustav Gihr (1894-1959), major general in the Second World War
- Siegfried Meister (1903-1982), engineer and politician (CDU), Member of Landtag, Member of Bundestag, Member of European Parliament
