= European Confederation of Roller Skating =

Governing body of roller skating and inline skating in Europe

World Skate Europe
- Abbreviation: WSE
- Affiliation: World Skate
- Headquarters: Rua António Pinto Machado, 60 Porto, Portugal
- President: Luís Sénica
- Vice president(s): Ignacio González Pereira; Fernando Leandro Naroli
- Secretary: Ricardo Araújo

Official website
- europe.worldskate.org

The European Confederation of Roller Skating (French: Confédération Européenne de Roller Skating, CERS), currently branded as World Skate Europe (WSE; infrequently as 'World Skate Europa'), is a governing body of roller skating and inline skating in Europe. The World Skate Europe is a member of World Skate, formerly the International Roller Sports Federation (FIRS).

Due to the 2022 Russian invasion of Ukraine, World Skate banned Russian and Belarusian athletes and officials from its competitions, and will not stage any events in Russia or Belarus in 2022.

== Sports ==
World Skate Europe is the highest regulating body of six roller sport disciplines in Europe:

- Artistic roller skating and inline figure skating
- Freestyle skating
- Inline hockey
- Inline speed skating
- Roller hockey
- Skateboarding*
- World Skate Europe - Rink Hockey

Skateboarding does not have a representative member in the Central Committee of World Skate Europe

== Events ==
- European Inline Speed Skating Championships
- European Artistic Roller Skating Championships
- European Freestyle Skating Championships
- Rink Hockey Men (Roller Hockey)
- Rink Hockey Women (Roller Hockey)
- European Inline Hockey Championships
- European Inline Alpine Championships
- European Inline Downhill Championships
- European Inline Freestyle Championships
- European Skateboarding Championships
- European Scootering Championships
- European Roller Derby Championships
- European Roller Freestyle Championships

== Subsidiaries ==
- World Skate Europe - Artistic Skating (WSE Artistic)
  - previously known as the Comite European de Patinage Artistico or CEPA
  - President: Margaret Brooks (Falerone, Italy)
- World Skate Europe - Inline Freestyle (WSE Freestyle)
  - President: Vladimir Tkachev (Moscow, Russia)
- World Skate Europe - Inline Hockey (WSE In-Line Hockey)
  - also known as the Comité Européen de Roller In Line Hockey or CERILH
  - President: Boris Darlet (Bordeaux, France)
- World Skate Europe - Speed Skating (WSE Speed)
  - also known as the Comité Européen de Course or CEC
- World Skate Europe - Rink Hockey (WSE Rink-Hockey)
  - also known as the Comité Européen de Rink-Hockey or CERH
  - President: Agostinho Peixoto da Silva (Porto, Portugal)
- World Skate Europe - Skateboarding
  - President: Luca Basilico (Lombardy, Italy)

== See also ==
- World Roller Games
- British Roller Sports Federation
- Roller derby
- Roller skiing
- World Skate Europe Rink Hockey
- Fédération Internationale de Roller Sports (FIRS)
- Confédération Européenne de Roller Skating (CERS)
- Roller Hockey International
- FIRS Inline Hockey World Championships
- CERILH
