= Campeonato Paulista de Futebol Amador do Estado =

Football tournament in Brazil

- Founded: 1942
- Region: (São Paulo (state)) São Paulo
- Current champions: C.A. Bandeirante (2025) (4th title)
- Most championships: Ferroviários A.C. (5 titles)

The Campeonato Paulista de Futebol Amador do Estado (São Paulo State Amateur Football Championship or Paulista Amateur Football Championship in English) is an amateur football association competition in the Brazilian state of São Paulo. Run by the FPF, it was established in 1942.

== History ==
In the early days of São Paulo football association, all competitions were amateur, so the winner of each tournament was also considered the amateur champion of a specific league for each season. With the irreversible process of professionalism in sports underway since the mid-1930s in Brazil, the Government of the State of São Paulo determined that there would be an entity to manage competitions for professional clubs and another to oversee championships for amateur teams. A federal government law standardized sports entities, stipulating that each federal unit of the country should have a single institution to manage football at the local level. As a result, in the State of São Paulo, the São Paulo Football Federation (FPF) was born, which in turn created specific departments for professional and amateur football. This separation between amateurs and professionals is a distinct characteristic of the Brazilian football association compared to other countries.

Thus, the amateur football department of the FPF was in charge of a series of official competitions specifically for amateur teams, creating, for example, the Amateur State Championship, which brought together the champions of the Campeonato do Interior (the São Paulo State Interior Amateur Championship, for amateur teams from outside Greater São Paulo) and the Torneio dos Campeões Amadores da Capital (the Tournament of Amateur Champions of the Capital of São Paulo, which brought the winners of the main amateur leagues from São Paulo).

During the 1970s, the FPF ceased to organize official competitions for amateur teams originating from the capital of São Paulo. As a result, the winner of the São Paulo State Interior Amateur Championship began to be directly recognized as the amateur champion of the entire state of São Paulo.

== Champions ==
=== Paulista Amateur Football Championship (1942–1977) ===
Year	Winners	Runners-up	Ref
1942	Laboratório Paulista de Biologia F.C. (São Paulo)	E.C. Taubaté (Taubaté)	
1943	Laboratório Paulista de Biologia F.C. (São Paulo)	E.C. Noroeste (Bauru)	
1944	Guarani F.C. (Campinas)	S.E. Palmeiras Amador (São Paulo)	
1945	S.E. Palmeiras Amador (São Paulo)	Batatais F.C. (Batatais)	
1946	Bauru A.C. (Bauru)	SAMS F.C. (São Paulo)	
1947	S.E. Palmeiras Amador (São Paulo)	Rio Pardo F.C. (São José do Rio Pardo)	
1948	Laboratório Paulista de Biologia F.C. (São Paulo)	São Paulo F.C. (Araraquara)	
1949	Laboratório Paulista de Biologia F.C. (São Paulo)	Altinópolis F.C. (Altinópolis)	
1950	América (Ibitinga)	Laboratório Paulista de Biologia F.C. (São Paulo)	
1951	A.A. Ponte Preta (Campinas)	A.A. Açucena (São Paulo)	
1952	Amparo A.C.(Amparo)	Acumuladores Durex F.C. (São Paulo)	
1953	Johnson Clube Brasil (São Paulo)	E.C. Santa Sofia (Pedreira)	
1954	C.A. Pirassununguense (Pirassununga)	Johnson Clube Brasil (São Paulo)	
1955	A.A. Matarazzo (São Paulo)	A.A. Itapetininga (Itapetininga)	
1956	CR Nitro-Química (São Paulo)	Atlético Brasil Clube (Paraguaçu Paulista)	
1957	E.C. Sampaio Moreira (São Paulo)	A.A. XI de Agosto (Tatuí)	
1958	E.C. Sampaio Moreira (São Paulo)	A.A. XI de Agosto (Tatuí)	
1959	Johnson Clube Brasil (São Paulo)	C.A. Flamengo (Araçatuba)	
1960	Usina São João F.C. (Araras)	A.A. Matarazzo (São Paulo)	
1961	(not held)		
1962	Usina São João F.C. (Araras)	A.E. Guarda Civil (São Paulo)	
1963	E.C. São José (Lençóis Paulista)	Gelomatic Clube (São Paulo)	
1964	E.C. São Geraldo (Sertãozinho)	A.A. Matarazzo (São Paulo)	
1965	E.C. Usina Santo Antônio (Sertãozinho)	A.A. Matarazzo (São Paulo)	
1966	Paulista F.C. (Jundiaí)	A.A. Matarazzo (São Paulo)	
1967	(not held)		
1968	Guaraci Clube (Guaraci)	C.A. Parque da Mooca (São Paulo)	
1969	C.A. Parque da Mooca (São Paulo)	E.C. União (Tambaú)	
1970	Torino E.C. (Jaú)	Máquinas Piratininga F.C. (São Paulo)	
1971	Máquinas Piratininga F.C. (São Paulo)	A.E. Industrial (Pindamonhangaba)	
1972	Santos E.C. (Andradina)	C.A. Pirelli (Santo André)	
1973	(not held)		
1974	A.E. Industrial (Pindamonhangaba)	Máquinas Piratininga F.C. (São Paulo)	
1975	(not held)		
1976	(not held)		
1977	A.D.C. Frum (São Paulo)	Rigesa E.C. (Valinhos)	

=== Paulista Amateur Football Championship (1978–present) ===
Year	Winners	Runners-up	Ref
1978	A.D.C. Rhodia (São José dos Campos)	E.C. Sanbra (Bauru)	
1979	A.D.C. Rhodia (São José dos Campos)	Palmeiras F.C. (Franca)	
1980	Torrinha E.C. (Torrinha)	C.A. Jardinopolense (Jardinópolis)	
1981	Corinthians F.C. (Pindamonhangaba)	Tabapuã F.C. (Tabapuã)	
1982	Corinthians F.C. (Pindamonhangaba)	Usina Junqueira (Igarapava)	
1983	E.C. Votoran (Boituva)	Brodowski F.C. (Brodowski)	
1984	C.A. Brotense (Brotas)	São Joaquim F.C. (Tatuí)	
1985	Associaçâo Olímpica (Jardinópolis)	Quatá F.C. (Quatá)	
1986	Brodowski F.C. (Brodowski)	Juventude Real Flamengo (Paulínia)	
1987	Quatá F.C. (Quatá)	Associaçâo Olímpica (Jardinópolis)	
1988	Katatumba Esporte (Piracicaba)	Grêmio F.C. (Bragança Paulista)	
1989	E.C. Votoran (Boituva)	São João F.C. (Capela do Alto)	
1990	Vila Santista F.C. (Americana)	S.E. Penha (Bragança Paulista)	
1991	Grêmio Igaraçuense (Igaraçu do Tietê)	A.A. Paulicéia (Jaú)	
1992	União F.C. (Valentim Gentil)	Katatumba Esporte (Piracicaba)	
1993	Associaçâo Olímpica (Jardinópolis)	A.E. Bandeirantes (Itatiba)	
1994	A.A. Pauliceia (Jaú)	União F.C. (Valentim Gentil)	
1995	A.A. Mocoembu (Dois Córregos)	Estrela do Mar (São José dos Campos)	
1996	A.A. Flamengo (Guarulhos)	Cruzeiro F.C. (Bauru)	
1997	G.R.E. Triagem (Bauru)	Associação (Bariri)	
1998	Nacional A.C. (Bauru)	Bandeirante (Suzano)	
1999	G.R.E. Triagem (Bauru)	Social Econômico A.C. (São José dos Campos)	
2000	A.A. Itapuí (Itapuí)	Jaraguá F.C. (Piracicaba)	
2001	A.A. Alvinlândia (Alvinlândia)	Social Econômico A.C. (São José dos Campos)	
2002	C.A. Bandeirante (Brodowski)	E.C. Paraíso do Sol (São José dos Campos)	
2003	S.E.C.H. Sumarezinho (Hortolândia)	Presidente Prudente F.C. (Presidente Prudente)	
2004	C.A. Brotense (Brotas)	São Joaquim F.C. (Tatuí)	
2005	Santos F.C. (Presidente Prudente)	S.E. Metalúrgicos (São Caetano do Sul)	
2006	E.C. Parque das Nações (Santo André)	A.A. Tacibense/Hinomoto (Taciba)	
2007	A.A. Estrela (Guarulhos)	Alvinlândia E.C. (Alvinlândia)	
2008	Real F.C. (Santo André)	E.C. Nacional da Vila Vivaldi (São Bernardo do Campo)	
2009	A.D.C. Valtra (Mogi das Cruzes)	A.D.C. Stefani (Jaboticabal)	
2010	União da Vila Sá F.C. (Santo André)	Sem Segredo E.C. (São José do Rio Preto)	
2011	S.A. Boa Vista (Diadema)	América F.C. (Atibaia)	
2012	S.A. Boa Vista (Diadema)	C.A. Juventus (Itu)	
2013	Ferroviários A.C. (Bragança Paulista)	E.C. Nacional da Vila Vivaldi (São Bernardo do Campo)	
2014	Ferroviários A.C. (Bragança Paulista)	A.A. Pontalindense (Pontalinda)	
2015	Vasco Vila Real F.C. (Guarulhos)	E.C. Nacional da Vila Vivaldi (São Bernardo do Campo)	
2016	Ferroviários A.C. (Bragança Paulista)	Garotos do América F.C. (Guarulhos)	
2017	S.E. Corinthians (São Bernardo do Campo)	Ferroviários A.C. (Bragança Paulista)	
2018	Ferroviários A.C. (Bragança Paulista)	C.A. Bandeirante (Brodowski)	
2019	Ferroviários A.C. (Bragança Paulista)	E.C. Sinésio Martins (São José dos Campos)	
2020	(not held)		
2021	(not held)		
2022	C.A. Bandeirante (Brodowski)	E.C. Santa Rita (São José dos Campos)	
2023	C.A. Bandeirante (Brodowski)	E.C. Nacional da Vila Vivaldi (São Bernardo do Campo)	
2024	C.A. Bandeirante (Brodowski)	Belenense F.C. (Mauá)	
2025	C.A. Bandeirante (Brodowski)	União F.C. (Atibaia)	

== See also ==
- Amateur Football Championship of São Paulo
