= Roller Hockey Intercontinental Cup =

Roller hockey competition

- Sport: Roller Hockey
- Founded: 1983
- Continent: International (World Skate)
- Most recent champions: (Spain) FC Barcelona (7 titles)
- Most titles: (Spain) FC Barcelona (7 titles)

The Intercontinental Cup was a roller hockey competition organized by World Skate and usually contested between the World Skate Europe and the World Skate America champions clubs.

== History ==
The Intercontinental Cup was established in 1985 and was organized by FIRS.

In 2006, the then-CIRH (Comité Internationale de Rink-Hockey) tried to establish a World Club Championship, but that competition was quickly discontinued in favor of the Intercontinental Cup.

In 2017, the Fédération Internationale de Roller Sports (FIRS) merged with the International Skateboarding Federation (ISF) to form World Skate, which organized the 2017 Intercontinental Cup played in a Final Four format by the 2016 and 2017 CERH European League champions, Benfica and Reus, and the 2016 and 2017 CSP South American Club Championship/CPP Pan-American Club Championship winners, Andes Talleres and Concepción, with Benfica facing Andes Talleres and Reus facing Concepción.

In 2018, the World Skate created the women's tournament, played in a Final Four formats by the four finalists of Europe and America.

In 2021, the Intercontinental Cup was disputed by the European champions Sporting and the runners-up FC Porto on a two-legged tie.

For the 2022 edition, FIRS struggled to find hosts to organize the edition. Valongo was the only team that offered to host the competition. FIRS could not get positive answers from South American teams and 2022 was disputed on 17 June 2023 in a single match between 2022 European League finalists.

In 2025, the Intercontinental Cup was replaced by Rink hockey World Club Championship

== Winners ==
Unofficial edition

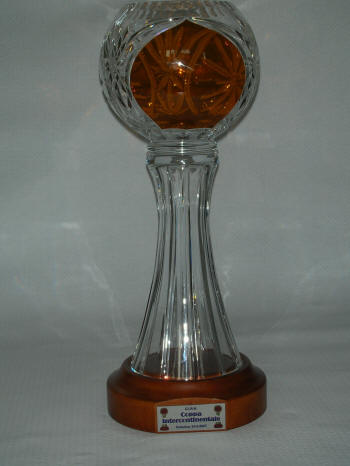
2007 trophy

Year	Location	Winner	Score	Runners-up
1983	(Brazil) Sertãozinho	(Spain) FC Barcelona	group	(Portugal) Porto
1985	(Brazil) Sertãozinho	(Brazil) Sertãozinho HC	group	(Brazil) Internacional Santos
1985	(Argentina) Rawson, San Juan	(Argentina) UVT	5–3, 5–4	(Spain) FC Barcelona
1987	(Spain) A Coruña	(Spain) HC Liceo	7–3, 17–2	(Argentina) Concepción PC
1989	(Spain) A Coruña	(Spain) HC Liceo	11–4, 8–2	(Argentina) CD Unión Estudiantil
1992	(Brazil) Sertãozinho	(Portugal) OC Barcelos	2–1, 7–3	(Brazil) Sertãozinho HC
1993	(Spain) A Coruña	(Spain) HC Liceo	7–5, 11–3	(Argentina) CD Unión Estudiantil
1998	(Spain) Barcelona	(Spain) FC Barcelona	13–1	(Argentina) UVT
2004	(Spain) Santiago de Compostela	(Spain) HC Liceo	9–1, 10–2	(Argentina) CD Unión Estudiantil
2006	(Spain) Alcoy	(Spain) FC Barcelona	8–3	(Argentina) Olimpia PC
2007	(Italy) Follonica	(Italy) Follonica Hockey	4–2	(Argentina) Concepción PC
2008	(Spain) Molins de Rei	(Spain) FC Barcelona	3–1	(Argentina) Concepción PC
2010	(Spain) Reus	(Spain) Reus Deportiu	4–1	(Argentina) Club Petroleros YPF
2012	(Spain) A Coruña	(Spain) HC Liceo	6–4	(Argentina) CA Huracán
2013	(Portugal) Torres Novas	(Portugal) SL Benfica	10–3	(Brazil) SC Recife
2014	(Spain) Barcelona	(Spain) FC Barcelona	6–2	(Argentina) Club Petroleros YPF
2016	(Spain) Vic	(Spain) CP Vic	5–1	(Argentina) CA Huracán
2017	(Spain) Reus	(Portugal) SL Benfica	5–3	(Spain) Reus Deportiu
2018	(Argentina) San Juan	(Spain) FC Barcelona	5–4	(Portugal) Porto
2021	(Portugal) Porto, Lisbon	(Portugal) Porto	6–3, 5–6	(Portugal) Sporting
2022	(Portugal) Valongo	(Italy) GSH Trissino	3–3 (3–1 (p))	(Portugal) AD Valongo
2023	(Argentina) San Juan	(Spain) FC Barcelona	6–3	(Portugal) Porto

== Statistics ==
=== Winners by team ===
Team	Winners	Runners-up
(Spain) FC Barcelona	7 (1983, 1998, 2006, 2008, 2014, 2018, 2023)	1 (1985)
(Spain) HC Liceo	5 (1987, 1989, 1993, 2004, 2012)	0
(Portugal) Benfica	2 (2013, 2017)	0
(Portugal) Porto	1 (2021)	3 (1983, 2018, 2023)
(Argentina) UVT	1 (1986)	1 (1998)
(Spain) Reus Deportiu	1 (2010)	1 (2017)
(Portugal) OC Barcelos	1 (1992)	0
(Italy) Follonica Hockey	1 (2007)	0
(Spain) CP Vic	1 (2016)	0
(Italy) GSH Trissino	1 (2022)	0
(Argentina) Concepción PC	0	3 (1987, 2007, 2008)
(Argentina) CD Unión Estudiantil	0	3 (1989, 1993, 2004)
(Argentina) Club Petroleros YPF	0	2 (2010, 2014)
(Argentina) CA Huracán	0	2 (2012, 2016)
(Brazil) Sertãozinho HC	0	1 (1992)
(Argentina) Olimpia PC	0	1 (2006)
(Brazil) SC Recife	0	1 (2013)
(Portugal) Sporting	0	1 (2021)
(Portugal) AD Valongo	0	1 (2022)

=== Winners by country ===
Country	Winners	Runners-up
Spain	14	3
Portugal	4	5
Italy	2	0
Argentina	1	12
Brazil	0	2
