= STZ =

STZ may refer to:

- Snowbird Tectonic Zone, a geological boundary in the Canadian Shield
- Stalingrad Tractor Factory (Russian: Stalingradskiy traktornyy zavod), now known as Volgograd Tractor Factory
- Stanozolol (STZ), an anabolic steroid
- Streptozotocin (streptozocin, STZ, Zanosar) is a naturally occurring chemical
- STZ, NYSE ticker symbol for Constellation Brands
- STZ TV, a Brazilian TV station
