= 1985 FIRS Intercontinental Cup =

Tournament details
- Host country: Argentina
- City: Rawson, San Juan
- Dates: August, 23 - 25, 1985
- Teams: 2

Final positions
- Champions: (Argentina) Unión Vecinal de Trinidad (1st title)
- Runners-up: (Spain) FC Barcelona

Tournament statistics
- Matches played: 2
- Goals scored: 17 (8.5 per match)

The 1985 FIRS Intercontinental Cup was the first official edition of the roller hockey tournament known as the Intercontinental Cup (after two non official editions), played between the 23 and 25 of August, 1985. This second edition saw a drastic change in format, as the winner of the CERH European Cup played the winner of the Roller Hockey South American Club Championship, in a two-legged final. Unión Vecinal de Trinidad won the cup, defeating FC Barcelona.

== Matches ==
August 23, 1985
August 23, 1985	Unión Vecinal de Trinidad (Argentina)	5 – 3	(Spain) FC Barcelona	Rawson, San Juan, Argentina

August 25, 1985
August 25, 1985	Unión Vecinal de Trinidad (Argentina)	5 – 4	(Spain) FC Barcelona	Rawson, San Juan, Argentina

== See also ==
- FIRS Intercontinental Cup
