= Caetetus Ecological Station =

- Estação Ecológica dos Caetetus
- IUCN category Ia (strict nature reserve)
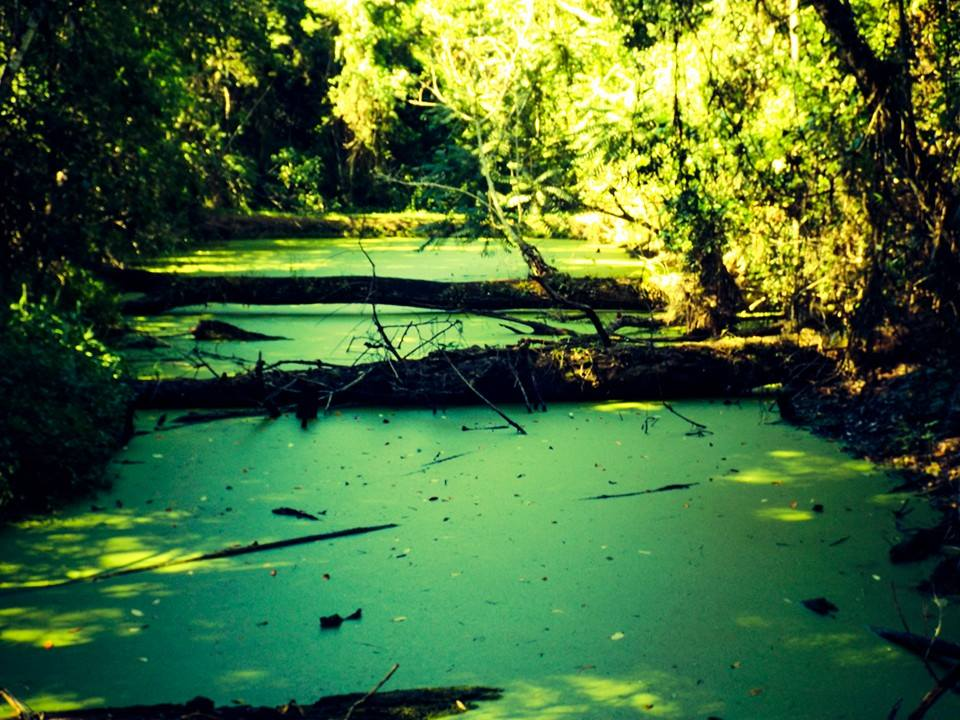
- A stream in the ESEC

- Location within Brazil
- Nearest city: Gália, São Paulo
- Coordinates: 22°24′11″S 49°42′08″W
- Area: 2,176.10 ha (8.4020 sq mi)
- Designation: Ecological station
- Created: 9 August 1976
- Administrator: Instituto Florestal SP

The Caetetus Ecological Station (Portuguese: Estação Ecológica dos Caetetus) is a state-level ecological station (ESEC) in the state of São Paulo, Brazil. It protects one of the last remnants of the semi-deciduous forest that once covered the west of the state, and is home to a population of the highly endangered black lion tamarin.

== Location ==
The Caetetus Ecological Station is divided between the municipalities of Alvinlândia (20.17%) and Gália (79.91%) in the state of São Paulo. It has an area of 2,176.10 hectares (5,377.3 acres). The ESEC is in the sandstone Marília Plateau region of the Western Plateau of São Paulo, formed by rocks of the Bauru group. The land in this region slopes slightly to the west, with an undulating relief. The ESEC has altitudes from 520 to 680 metres (1,710 to 2,230 ft), mainly with gentle slopes of less than 6%.

The ESEC is on the northern boundary of the Paranapanema basin. It lies south of the Peixe River basin, and contains the sources of streams that feed the Paranapanema. In the higher regions the streams form waterfalls. An escarpment cut by newly-formed valleys separates the upper plateau regions from the lower area where the Meio, Barreiro and Lagoa streams converge. The Meio stream is a tributary of the São João River, which in turn is a tributary of the Turvo River, which feeds the Paranapanema.

== History ==
The Gália State Reserve was created from part of the Fazenda Paraíso as a forest reserve on 9 August 1976 by decree 8.346 by Governor Paulo Egidio Martins, who declared the land to be of public utility, to be expropriated by the state treasury and to be used for research and preservation of natural reserves. Governor André Franco Montoro transformed it into the Caetetus Ecological Station by decree 26.718 of 6 February 1987. By law 9.264 of 19 December 1995 the name was changed to "Olavo Amaral Ferraz Ecological Station".

== Environment ==
The Köppen climate classification is Cwa, mesothermic with dry winter, rains from October to March and periods of drought from April to September. Average annual rainfall is 1,431 millimetres (56.3 in). Average annual temperature is 21.5 °C (70.7 °F). Average temperatures range from 16.5 °C (61.7 °F) in June to 24.7 °C (76.5 °F) in January and February. Minimum and maximum temperatures are 10 °C (50 °F) and 30 °C (86 °F) respectively.

The ESEC contains a significant remnant of broad leaved forest. Seasonal semi-deciduous forest once covered the western plateau of São Paulo, but only 6% survives. There are no other significant remnants of natural forest within a radius of 200 kilometres (120 mi), so the ESEC is of great importance in understanding the original regional ecosystem. Common plants species include chupa-ferro (Metrodorea nigra), guaraiúva (Savia dictyocarpa), canela (Ocotea indecora), catiguá (Trichilia Catagua) and peroba-rosa (Aspidosperma polyneuron), with heights varying from 8 to 32 metres (26 to 105 ft). The forests include the most valuable timber species exploited in the early 20th century, including the cedar, peroba, cabreúva, ipês, paumarfim, jequitibá, guarantã and amendoim, as well as many other less well known species.

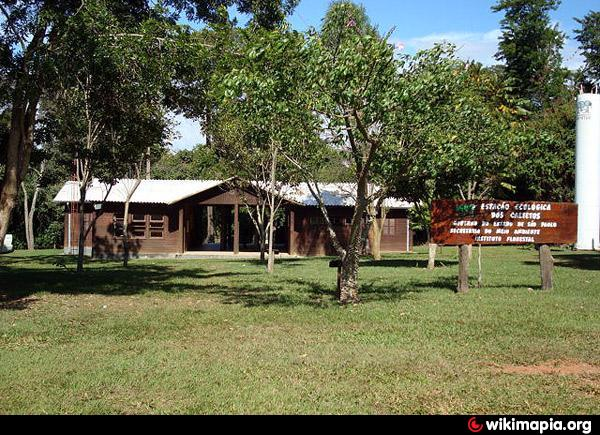
Visitor center

The ESEC is home to the black lion tamarin (Leontopithecus chrysopygus), one of the world's most endangered primates. After six years with no record of their presence, two adult black lion tamarins were discovered at the ESEC in August 2016 near the administrative headquarters. Other medium and large mammals threatened with extinction or vulnerable in the region include the cougar (Puma concolor), ocelot (Leopardus pardalis) and oncilla (Leopardus tigrinus). Vulnerable large animals, presumably threatened in the ESEC, include the collared peccary (Pecari tajacu), white-lipped peccary (Tayassu pecari) and South American tapir (Tapirus terrestris). 12 brown howler (Alouatta guariba) individuals were released in the ESEC in 1986, but this is too small a population to be viable.

A census of birds from October 2005 to December 2006 recorded 226. Another 68 species have been reported by other authors, making a total of 293 in the ESEC. Many were endemic to the Atlantic Forest of cerrado, and some were endangered in the state of São Paulo. The blue-winged macaw (Primolius maracana) is considered vulnerable.

== Visiting ==
The ESEC provides interpretation of nature and environmental education through the Paraiso Trail and the Cipó Trail, both of which have interpretive signs about the regional vegetation. Students and organized groups make scheduled visits daily, with the aim of promoting environmental awareness. The ESEC is supported by IPE (Instituto de Pesquisas Ecológicas) and by the FNMA (Fundo Nacional do Meio Ambiente).

== Sources ==
- Cavarzere, Vagner; Moraes, Gabriel Parmezani; Donatelli, Reginaldo José (2009), "Avifauna da Estação Ecológica dos Caetetus, interior de São Paulo, Brasil", Papéis Avulsos de Zoologia, 49 (35), São Paulo: 477–485, doi:10.1590/S0031-10492009003500001, hdl:11449/28492, ISSN 1807-0205
- ESEC dos Caetetus "Olavo Amaral Ferraz" (in Portuguese), ISA: Instituto Socioambiental
- "Estação Ecológica de Caetetus", Ambienta Brasil (in Portuguese)
- Mico-leão-preto ressurge na Estação Ecológica Caetetus (in Portuguese), Fundação Florestal, 8 September 2016
- Tabanez, Marlene Francisca; Durigan, Giselda; Keuroghlian, Alexine; Barbosa, Antonio Flávio (February 2005), Plano de Manejo da Estação Ecológica dos Caetetus (PDF) (in Portuguese), São Paulo: Instituto Florestal
