= Revived Presbyterian Church for the Nations =

Brazilian religious group

- Classification: Protestant
- Orientation: Pentecostalism
- Polity: Episcopalian
- Region: Brazil
- Founder: Eliseu Ribeiro da Silva
- Origin: 1998; Guarulhos, São Paulo, Brazil

The Revived Presbyterian Church for the Nations (in Portuguese Igreja Presbiteriana Avivada Para as Nações or IPAN) is a Pentecostal denomination, founded in 1998, in Guarulhos, São Paulo, by Bishop Eliseu Ribeiro da Silva.

The denomination became known in 2014 for accusations of involvement with ghost companies and money laundering.

In addition, it is known for its political involvement in Guarulhos and its social works.
