= 2018 Roller Hockey Women's Intercontinental Cup =

2018 Roller Hockey Intercontinental Cup
Tournament details
- Host country: Argentina
- City: San Juan
- Dates: 15–16 December
- Teams: 4
- Venue(s): 1 (in 1 host city)

Final positions
- Champions: (Argentina) Concepción (1st title)
- Runners-up: (Spain) Gijón

Tournament statistics
- Matches played: 3
- Goals scored: 20 (6.67 per match)

The 2018 Roller Hockey Women's Intercontinental Cup is the first edition of the roller hockey tournament known as the Women's Intercontinental Cup, endorsed by World Skate. It was held in the Estadio Aldo Cantoni in San Juan, Argentina.

It was played together with the men's tournament.

== Format ==
The tournament was a knockout competition in a final four format; four teams entered, with the host selected after the teams became known. To enter the tournament teams had to be a finalist from either the 2017–18 Euroleague or the South American Club Championship/Pan-American Club Championship of 2018.

== Teams ==
Team	Qualified as
(Spain) Gijón	2017–18 Euroleague winner
(Portugal) Benfica	2017–18 Euroleague runner-up
(Argentina) Concepción	2018 South American Roller Hockey Club Championship winner
(Argentina) Andes Talleres	2018 Pan-American Roller Hockey Club Championship runner-up

== Matches ==
In all matches, extra time and a penalty shootout were used to decide the winner if necessary.

=== Bracket ===
Semi-finals
15 December
(Argentina) Concepción	4
(Portugal) Benfica	3
15 December
(Argentina) Andes Talleres	3
(Spain) Gijón (a.e.t.)	4

Final
16 December
(Argentina) Concepción	4
(Spain) Gijón	2

=== Semi-finals ===
15 December 2018

Concepción (Argentina)	4–3	(Portugal) Benfica

Aldo Cantoni, San Juan
15 December 2018

Andes Talleres (Argentina)	3–4 (a.e.t.)	(Spain) Gijón

Aldo Cantoni, San Juan

=== Final ===
16 December 2018

Concepción (Argentina)	4–2	(Spain) Gijón

Aldo Cantoni, San Juan
