= 2012 FIRS Intercontinental Cup =

Tournament details
- Host country: Spain
- City: A Coruña
- Dates: November 13th, 2012
- Teams: 2

Final positions
- Champions: (Spain) HC Liceo La Coruña (5th title)
- Runners-up: (Argentina) Club Atlético Huracán

Tournament statistics
- Matches played: 1
- Goals scored: 10 (10 per match)

The 2012 FIRS Intercontinental Cup was the thirteenth edition of the roller hockey tournament known as the Intercontinental Cup, played on November 13, 2012, at the Palacio de los Deportes de Riazor, in A Coruña, Spain. HC Liceo La Coruña (winner of the 2011–12 CERH European League) won the cup for a record fifth time, defeating Club Atlético Huracán (winner of the 2011 CSP South American Club Championship).

== Match ==
November 13th, 2012; 21:00 (UTC +01:00)
November 13th, 2012; 21:00 (UTC +01:00)	HC Liceo La Coruña (Spain)	6 – 4 (5 – 0 HT)	(Argentina) Club Atlético Huracán	Palacio de los Deportes de Riazor, A Coruña
November 13th, 2012; 21:00 (UTC +01:00)	1–0 Josep Lamas 1'; 2–0 Josep Lamas 3'; 3–0 Jordi Bargalló 4'; 4-0 Josep Lamas 16'; 5–0 Toni Pérez 17'; 6–0 Eduard Lamas 34'	Report (p. 102)	6–1 Juan Pablo Glaría 39'; 6–2 Pablo Cabañuz 40'; 6–3 Pablo Cabañuz 42'; 6–4 Pablo Cabañuz 49'	Palacio de los Deportes de Riazor, A Coruña
	Umpires: Daniel Villar, Rubén Fernandez (Spain)

== See also ==
- FIRS Intercontinental Cup
