= Women's Roller Hockey South American Club Championship =

- Founded: 1997
- Region: South America (CSP)
- Teams: 8
- Current champions: (Argentina) Concepción Patín Club (2nd title)
- Most championships: (Argentina) Concepción Patín Club (2 titles)
- Website: CSP Official Website

The Women's South American Club Championship is an annual roller hockey club competition organized by CSP (South American Roller Confederation) with the most successful women's teams of South America.

== Winners ==
Season	City Host	Winner	Runner-up	3rd place
1997	(Brazil) São Paulo	(Brazil) Portuguesa	(Argentina) Concepción Patín Club	(Brazil) Minho Recife
1999	(Brazil) Recife	(Argentina) Concepción Patín Club	(Brazil) Minho Recife	(Brazil) Português do Recife
2015	(Brazil) Sertãozinho	(Argentina) Concepción Patín Club	(Argentina) Maipu-giol	(Argentina) Centro Valenciano
2016	(Argentina) Mendoza	(Argentina) Andes Talleres	(Argentina) SEC	(Argentina) Concepción Patín Club

=== Wins by team ===
Team	Wins
(Argentina) Concepción	2
(Brazil) Portuguesa	1
(Argentina) Andes Talleres	1

=== Wins by country ===
Country	Wins
Argentina	3
Brazil	1
