= 2018 Roller Hockey Intercontinental Cup =

Tournament details
- Host country: Argentina
- City: San Juan
- Dates: 14–16 December
- Teams: 4
- Venue: 1 (in 1 host city)

Final positions
- Champions: (Spain) Barcelona (5th title)
- Runners-up: (Portugal) Porto

Tournament statistics
- Matches played: 3
- Goals scored: 30 (10 per match)

The 2018 Roller Hockey Intercontinental Cup is the 17th edition of the roller hockey tournament known as the Intercontinental Cup, endorsed by World Skate. It was held in the Estadio Aldo Cantoni in San Juan, Argentina.

For the first time, it was played together with the newly created 2018 Roller Hockey Women's Intercontinental Cup.

== Format ==
The tournament was a knockout competition in a final four format; four teams entered, with the host selected after the teams became known. Entered the tournament the from the 2017–18 Euroleague finalists and the South American Club Championship/Pan-American Club Championship finalists of the 2018.

== Teams ==
Team	Qualified as
(Spain) Barcelona	2017–18 Euroleague winner
(Portugal) Porto	2017–18 Euroleague runner-up
(Argentina) Murialdo	2016 South American Roller Hockey Club Championship winner
(Argentina) Concepción	2018 Pan-American Roller Hockey Club Championship runner-up

== Matches ==
In all matches, extra time and a penalty shootout were used to decide the winner if necessary.

=== Bracket ===
Semi-finals
14 December
(Argentina) Murialdo	5
(Portugal) Porto	7
14 December
(Spain) Barcelona	7
(Argentina) Concepción	2

Final
16 December
(Portugal) Porto	4
(Spain) Barcelona (a.e.t.)	5

=== Semi-finals ===
14 December 2018

Murialdo (Argentina)	5–7	(Portugal) Porto

Aldo Cantoni, San Juan
14 December 2018

Barcelona (Spain)	7–2	(Argentina) Concepción

Aldo Cantoni, San Juan

=== Final ===
16 December 2018

Porto (Portugal)	4–5 (a.e.t.)	(Spain) Barcelona

Aldo Cantoni, San Juan
