= 2007 FIRS Intercontinental Cup =

Tournament details
- Host country: Italy
- City: Follonica
- Dates: March 24, 2007
- Teams: 2

Final positions
- Champions: (Italy) Follonica Hockey (1st title)
- Runners-up: (Argentina) Concepción PC

Tournament statistics
- Matches played: 1
- Goals scored: 6 (6 per match)

The 2007 FIRS Intercontinental Cup was the tenth edition of the roller hockey tournament known as the Intercontinental Cup, played on March 24, 2007, at Follonica, Italy. Follonica Hockey won the cup, defeating Concepción PC.

== Match ==
March 24, 2007
March 24, 2007	Follonica Hockey (Italy)	4 – 2	(Argentina) Concepción PC	Follonica, Italy

== See also ==
- FIRS Intercontinental Cup
