= Campeonato de Futebol Amador de São Paulo =

Football tournament in Brazil

Campeonato de Futebol Amador de São Paulo Campeonato de Futebol Varzeano de São Paulo
- Founded: 1942
- Region: São Paulo
- Most championships: E.C. Sampaio Moreira do Tatuapé (6 titles)

The Campeonato de Futebol Amador de São Paulo (in English: Amateur Football Championship of São Paulo), also known as the Campeonato de Futebol Varzeano de São Paulo, is the main official competition for amateur football association based in the city of São Paulo, Brazil.

== History ==
In the early 1940s, the federal government directly intervened in the organization of Brazilian football to resolve the intense disputes between amateurism and professionalism in the country. As a result, there was a complete separation between amateur and professional teams/athletes – a unique characteristic of Brazilian – and the government mandated that each federative units of Brazil should have only one governing body for controlling football at the state level. This led to the creation of the Federação Paulista de Futebol (FPF), which became the sole recognized organization to manage football throughout the state of São Paulo.

The FPF reorganized state football by establishing distinct and exclusive departments to manage football for amateurs and professionals, each with their own statutes and regulations within the federation. In the case of amateur football, numerous local leagues were established in cities to accommodate the numerous existing teams that chose to remain amateur, while others opted for professionalism and could participate in the league system of this category.

In São Paulo City, there was even a separation within amateurism itself, with three autonomous leagues. The Campeonato Amador da Capital (Capital Amateur Championship) brought together a select group of non-classist amateur clubs from São Paulo. The Campeonato Varzeano (São Paulo Varzeano Championship) was the largest in terms of participants, consisting of dozens of district sub-leagues from the city of São Paulo, whose winners competed for the street champion title of the season. Finally, there were "classist leagues" exclusively composed of teams formed by employees of specific sectors of the industry, commerce, and services, as well as public employees, such as the Commerce League (ACEA) and the Industrial League (LECI). At the end of the season, there was a competition known as the Torneio dos Campeões Amadores da Capital (Tournament of Amateur Champions of the Capital of São Paulo) to determine the city's representative in the final of the São Paulo State Amateur Football Championship.

In the 1970s, the FPF stopped directly organizing competitions for amateur team from São Paulo. It then fell to the Municipal Department of Sports and Leisure (SEME) of the São Paulo City Hall to take on the responsibility of organizing an official competition, the Campeonato Varzeano da SEME (São Paulo SEME Varzeano Championship).

The FPF briefly resumed the management of the municipal championship between 1985 and 1992, only to lose interest in its direct organization again. With the structural support of the FPF and sponsorship from Kaiser company, the SEME created the Copa Kaiser/SEME de Futebol Amador (Kaiser/SEME Amateur Football Cup), which had its first edition in 1995. Over the years, the tournament became a success in the city's amateur football scene and grew to the point of having two divisions with promotion and relegation.

The Copa Kaiser/SEME was discontinued shortly after its 2004 edition, replaced by the Copa Metropolitana (Metropolitan Cup), a competition conceived by the then Department of Youth, Sport, and Leisure (SELJ) of the São Paulo state government. It featured teams from São Paulo and its surrounding cities.

In 2007, the Copa Kaiser/SEME was revived. However, in 2014, the brewery company announced the end of its sponsorship. Another local beer brand, Itaipava, was announced as the new sponsor of the amateur competition, but the tournament was canceled a few weeks before its scheduled start on July 26, 2015.

== Champions ==
=== FPF (1941–1975) ===
| Year | Winner | Runner-up | Identity | Ref |
|---|---|---|---|---|
| 1942 | A.A. Light & Power | Lapeaninho F.C. da Lapa | Campeonato Amador da Capital | |
| 1942 | A.A. Guarani | C.E. Juventus da Penha | Campeonato Varzeano da Capital | |
| 1943 | C.E. América | União Vasco da Gama F.C. da Mooca | Campeonato Amador da Capital | |
| 1943 | Portuguesa Paulista F.C. do Brooklin | | Campeonato Varzeano da Capital | |
| 1944 | União Vasco da Gama F.C. da Mooca | Ícaro A.C. | Campeonato Amador da Capital | |
| 1944 | Portuguesa Paulista F.C. do Brooklin | | Campeonato Varzeano da Capital | |
| 1945 | São Cristóvão F.C. do Itaim Bibi | Ícaro A.C. | Campeonato Amador da Capital | |
| 1945 | R União Vila Esperança F.C. | | Campeonato Varzeano da Capital | |
| 1946 | Santo Amaro F.C. | Lapeaninho F.C. da Lapa | Campeonato Amador da Capital | |
| 1946 | Portuguesa Paulista F.C. do Brooklin | | Campeonato Varzeano da Capital | |
| 1947 | E.C. União Silva Teles do Pari | A.A. Açucena do Limão | Campeonato Amador da Capital | |
| 1947 | A.A.R. Vila Deodoro | | Campeonato Varzeano da Capital | |
| 1948 | A.A.R. Vila Deodoro | | Campeonato Amador da Capital | |
| 1948 | | | Campeonato Varzeano da Capital | |
| 1949 | R União Vila Esperança F.C. | | Campeonato Amador da Capital | |
| 1949 | Estrela da Saúde F.C. | | Campeonato Varzeano da Capital | |
| 1950 | A.C. Flor da Vila Ipojuca | | Campeonato Amador da Capital | |
| 1950 | Lausanne Paulista F.C. | | Campeonato Varzeano da Capital | |
| 1951 | A.A. Açucena do Limão | | Campeonato Amador da Capital | |
| 1951 | Jardim Europa F.C. | E.C. Ordem e Progresso do Bom Retiro | Campeonato Varzeano da Capital | |
| 1952 | A.A. Açucena do Limão | | Campeonato Amador da Capital | |
| 1952 | Sete de Setembro F.C. de Pinheiros | | Campeonato Varzeano da Capital | |
| 1953 | A.A. Açucena do Limão | | Campeonato Amador da Capital | |
| 1953 | Sete de Setembro F.C. de Pinheiros | São Cristóvão F.C. do Itaim Bibi | Campeonato Varzeano da Capital | |
| 1954 | A.A. União Tatuapé | | Campeonato Amador da Capital | |
| 1954 | E.C. Sampaio Moreira do Tatuapé | C.D.R. Carlos Gomes da Barra Funda | Campeonato Varzeano da Capital | |
| 1955 | Vila Primavera F.C. do Tatuapé | | Campeonato Amador da Capital | |
| 1955 | S.E.R. Sete de Setembro F.C. da Freguesia do Ó | | Campeonato Varzeano da Capital | |
| 1956 | Vila Primavera F.C. do Tatuapé | | Campeonato Amador da Capital | |
| 1956 | E.C. Sampaio Moreira do Tatuapé | Grêmio Maranhense do Tatuapé | Campeonato Varzeano da Capital | |
| 1957 | União Tietê F.C. de Guarulhos | | Campeonato Amador da Capital | |
| 1957 | E.C. Sampaio Moreira do Tatuapé | A.A.R. Nacional do Bom Retiro | Campeonato Varzeano da Capital | |
| 1958 | E.C. Sampaio Moreira do Tatuapé | A.A. União Tatuapé do Tatuapé | Campeonato Amador da Capital | |
| 1958 | Lestinho F.C. da Água Rasa | C.D.R. Carlos Gomes da Barra Funda | Campeonato Varzeano da Capital | |
| 1959 | E.C. Sampaio Moreira do Tatuapé | C.C.A.A. Guapira do Jaçanã | Campeonato Amador da Capital | |
| 1959 | Democráticos F.C. do Ipiranga | | Campeonato Varzeano da Capital | |
| 1960 | E.C. Sampaio Moreira do Tatuapé | C.C.A.A. Guapira do Jaçanã | Campeonato Amador da Capital | |
| 1960 | E.C. Estrela do Ipiranga | C.R. Vasco da Gama da Vila Matilde | Campeonato Varzeano da Capital | |
| 1961 | A.A. Açucena do Limão | E.C. Sampaio Moreira do Tatuapé | Campeonato Amador da Capital | |
| 1961 | A.A. Caramuru de Indianópolis | | Campeonato Varzeano da Capital | |
| 1962 | (not held or unfinished) | | Campeonato Amador da Capital | |
| 1962 | A.A. Caramuru de Indianópolis | | Campeonato Varzeano da Capital | |
| 1963 | (not held or unfinished) | | Campeonato Amador da Capital | |
| 1963 | C.R. Vasco da Gama da Vila Matilde | | Campeonato Varzeano da Capital | |
| 1964 | C.C.A.A. Guapira do Jaçanã | | Campeonato Amador da Capital | |
| 1964 | Saib F.C. de Chora Menino | | Campeonato Varzeano da Capital | |
| 1965 | A.A. Açucena do Limão | | Campeonato Amador da Capital | |
| 1965 | (not held or unfinished) | | Campeonato Varzeano da Capital | |
| 1966 | Clube Acco da Lapa | | Campeonato Amador da Capital | |
| 1966 | | | Campeonato Varzeano da Capital | |
| 1967 | (not held) | | Campeonato Amador da Capital | |
| 1967 | | | Campeonato Varzeano da Capital | |
| 1968 | (not held) | | Campeonato Amador da Capital | |
| 1968 | | | Campeonato Varzeano da Capital | |
| 1969 | C.A. Parque da Mooca | | Campeonato Amador da Capital | |
| 1970-1975 | (unknown or not held) | | Campeonato Amador da Capital | |

=== SEME (1976–1984) ===
| Year | Winner | Runner-up | Identity | Ref |
|---|---|---|---|---|
| 1976 | E.C. Corinthians da Vila Piauí | E.C. São José de Parelheiros | Campeonato Varzeano da Capital | |
| 1977 | A.E.R. Ford de São Bernardo do Campo | E.C. Corinthians da Vila Piauí | Campeonato Varzeano da Capital | |
| 1978 | Nacional Clube da Vila Mariana | E.C. Noroeste da Vila Formosa | Campeonato Varzeano da Capital | |
| 1979 | Paulista Clube da Vila Carrão | Flor do Parque da Lapa F.C. | Campeonato Varzeano da Capital | |
| 1980 | Real Madrid Clube de Osasco | Estrela Caçula F.C. da Vila Sabrina | Campeonato Varzeano da Capital | |
| 1981 | Luzitano F.C. da Vila Manchester | Sociedade Unidos de Pirituba | Campeonato Varzeano da Capital | |
| 1982-1984 | (unknown or not held) | | | |

=== FPF (1985–1992) ===
| Year | Winner | Runner-up | Identity | Ref |
|---|---|---|---|---|
| 1985 | Ressaca Clube do Tatuapé | Comercial F.C. de Pirituba | Campeonato Varzeano da FPF | |
| 1986 | XI Primos F.C. da Vila Carioca | Grêmio Botafogo F.C. de Guaianases | Campeonato Varzeano da FPF | |
| 1987 | C.A. Paulistano do Jardim Coimbra | S.E. Corinthians do Jardim Aricanduva | Campeonato Varzeano da FPF | |
| 1988 | (not held) | | Campeonato Varzeano da FPF | |
| 1989 | Grêmio Botafogo F.C. de Guaianases | G.R. Michelle da Vila Sabrina | Campeonato Varzeano da FPF | |
| 1990 | Grêmio Botafogo F.C. de Guaianases | C.A. Paulistano do Jardim Coimbra | Campeonato Varzeano da FPF | |
| 1991 | G.R. Michelle da Vila Sabrina | Grêmio Botafogo F.C. de Guaianases | Campeonato Varzeano da FPF | |
| 1992 | Ajax F.C. da Vila Rica | A.A. Pery Novo da Vila Nova Cachoeirinha | Campeonato Varzeano da FPF | |
| 1993-1994 | (not held) | | | |

=== SEME (1995–2004) ===
| Year | Winner | Runner-up | Identity | Ref |
|---|---|---|---|---|
| 1995 | C.A. Paulistano do Jardim Coimbra | Confiança F.C. de Sapopemba | Copa Kaiser/SEME | |
| 1996 | A.A. Boa Esperança de São Mateus | G.R. Michelle da Vila Sabrina | Copa Kaiser/SEME | |
| 1997 | Grêmio Botafogo F.C. de Guaianases | MAC F.C. de Cidade Tiradentes | Copa Kaiser/SEME | |
| 1998 | A.A. Cruz Credo da Vila Formosa | A.A. Boa Esperança de São Mateus | Copa Kaiser/SEME | |
| 1999 | Lausanne Paulista F.C. | Botafogo F.S. do Jaçanã | Copa Antarctica/SEME | |
| 2000 | A.A. Boa Esperança de São Mateus | 100 Mizéria F.S. do Parque Guarani | Copa Kaiser/SEME | |
| 2001 | S.C. XI Garotos de Ermelino Matarazzo | Mella Pé F.S. da Vila Mazzei | Copa Kaiser/SEME | |
| 2002 | E.C. Napoli da Vila Industrial | E.C. Riachuelo do Jardim Brasil | Copa Kaiser/SEME | |
| 2003 | E.C. Riachuelo do Jardim Brasil | AG Madeiras do Brás | Copa Kaiser/SEME | |
| 2004 | AG Madeiras do Brás | A.A. Boa Esperança de São Mateus | Copa Kaiser/SEME | |

=== SELJ (2004–2006) ===
| Year | Winner | Runner-up | Identity | Ref |
|---|---|---|---|---|
| 2004 | E.C. Água Santa de Diadema | Grêmio Botafogo F.C. de Guaianases | Copa Metropolitana | |
| 2005 | Leões da Geolândia da Vila Medeiros | Pânico F.R. de Cajamar | Copa Metropolitana | |
| 2006 | Grêmio Botafogo F.C. de Guaianases | Hooligans D-2 de Ferraz de Vasconcelos | Copa Metropolitana | |

=== SEME (2007–2014) ===
| Year | Winner | Runner-up | Identity | Ref |
|---|---|---|---|---|
| 2007 | G.D.R. Danúbio da Freguesia do Ó | E.C. Napoli da Vila Industrial | Copa Kaiser/SEME | |
| 2008 | A.E. Nós Travamos do Jardim Tupi | E.C. Vida Loka da Vila Brasilândia | Copa Kaiser/SEME | |
| 2009 | E.C. Vida Loka da Vila Brasilândia | Ajax F.C. da Vila Rica | Copa Kaiser/SEME | |
| 2010 | E.C. Pioneer da Vila Guacuri | A.E. Sedex da Cidade Tiradentes | Copa Kaiser/SEME | |
| 2011 | E.C. Classe A da Barra Funda | G.R. Turma do Baffô do Jardim Clímax | Copa Kaiser/SEME | |
| 2012 | Ajax F.C. da Vila Rica | G.R. Turma do Baffô do Jardim Clímax | Copa Kaiser/SEME | |
| 2013 | Leões da Geolândia da Vila Medeiros | A.A. Família 100 Valor do Jaraguá | Copa Kaiser/SEME | |
| 2014 | Nove de Julho F.C. da Casa Verde Alta | Leões da Geolândia da Vila Medeiros | Copa Kaiser/SEME | |
| 2015-2023 | (not held) | | | |
