= Municipal Conservatory of Guarulhos =

Coordinates: 23.4692°S 46.5333°W

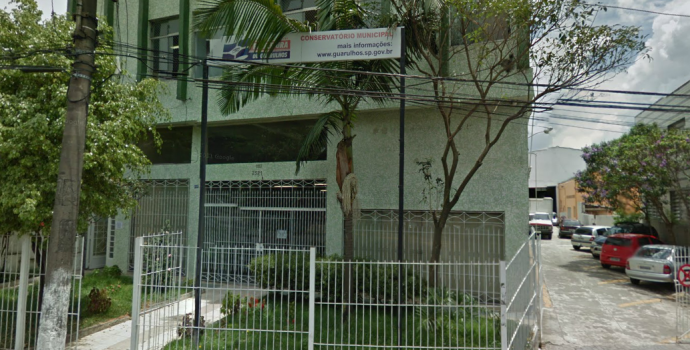
- Formation: 1961
- Legal status: Active
- Purpose: To develop human potential through music and the arts.
- Location(s): 2529, Tiradentes Avenue, Guarulhos, Sao Paulo
- Region served: Brazil
- Official language: Portuguese
- Website: Home page

The Municipal Conservatory of Guarulhos is a public educational institution of study and training of music, managed by the municipal government of the city of Guarulhos in the state of São Paulo in Brazil. The school provides courses in singing, clarinet, acoustic and electric bass guitar, flute, classical and popular percussion, piano, saxophone, trombone, trumpet, viola, guitar, violin, cello, and electric guitar.

== History ==
The Municipal Conservatory of Guarulhos was created by the Municipal Law No. 732, of January 3, 1961. It had as its main objective the teaching of music and its dissemination in various genres. The law guaranteed gratuity of all courses and decreed that the institution would operate, in principle, experimentally. At first, it were offered courses of musical instruments and singing, but the following year was the creation of the law No. 8483 that implemented to its curriculum, courses in drawing, painting and sculpture, thus, the entity had a new nomenclature and transferred its name to Municipal Conservatory of Music and Art, however, the extra courses did not last long. Then, in 2010, a new Municipal Law No. 6,742 of 22 October changed the nomenclature for Municipal Conservatory of Guarulhos. In 2011 the institution completed 50 years of existence and its instructions includes music theory and music history. Now it has 30 teachers, including specialists, masters and doctors and 813 students enrolled, today it is one of the most traditional cultural institutions of Guarulhos.

== Community participation ==
The school offers various integration activities that are open to students and the community, to exercise and develop the musical techniques through practice. The activities are developed by various groups including: popular and classical percussion, choir, stringed instruments, wind instruments and piano. Additionally, the institution regularly opens free public registrations for its music courses, which are available to children, youths, and adults at beginner, intermediate, and advanced levels. Today, the school is responsible for most of the musical performances in the City of Guarulhos, contributing to the cultural and artistic diffusion of the city. Each month, about 10 free performances are held by the students of the conservatory and the participants of the projects.
