= 1987 FIRS Intercontinental Cup =

Tournament details
- Host country: Spain
- City: A Coruña
- Dates: December, 23 - 29, 1987
- Teams: 2

Final positions
- Champions: (Spain) HC Liceo La Coruña (1st title)
- Runners-up: (Argentina) Concepción PC

Tournament statistics
- Matches played: 2
- Goals scored: 29 (14.5 per match)

The 1987 FIRS Intercontinental Cup was the third edition of the roller hockey tournament known as the Intercontinental Cup, played in December 1987. HC Liceo La Coruña won the cup, defeating Concepción PC.

== Matches ==
23 December, 1987
23 December, 1987	HC Liceo La Coruña (Spain)	7 – 3	(Argentina) Concepción PC	A Coruña, Spain

29 December, 1987
29 December, 1987	HC Liceo La Coruña (Spain)	17 – 2	(Argentina) Concepción PC	A Coruña, Spain

== See also ==
- FIRS Intercontinental Cup
