= 1993 FIRS Intercontinental Cup =

Tournament details
- Host country: Spain
- City: A Coruña
- Dates: 7-10 April 1993
- Teams: 2

Final positions
- Champions: (Spain) HC Liceo La Coruña (3rd title)
- Runners-up: (Argentina) CDU Estudiantil

Tournament statistics
- Matches played: 2
- Goals scored: 26 (13 per match)

The 1993 FIRS Intercontinental Cup was the sixth edition of the roller hockey tournament known as the Intercontinental Cup, played in April 1993. HC Liceo La Coruña won the cup, defeating CDU Estudiantil.

== Matches ==
7 April 1993
| 7 April 1993 | HC Liceo La Coruña (Spain) | 7 – 5 | (Argentina) CDU Estudiantil | A Coruña, Spain |

10 April 1993
| 10 April 1993 | HC Liceo La Coruña (Spain) | 11 – 3 | (Argentina) CDU Estudiantil | A Coruña, Spain |

== See also ==
- FIRS Intercontinental Cup
