= São Paulo Air Force Base =

Air base of the Brazilian Air Force

- Base Aérea de São Paulo
- Guarulhos, São Paulo in Brazil
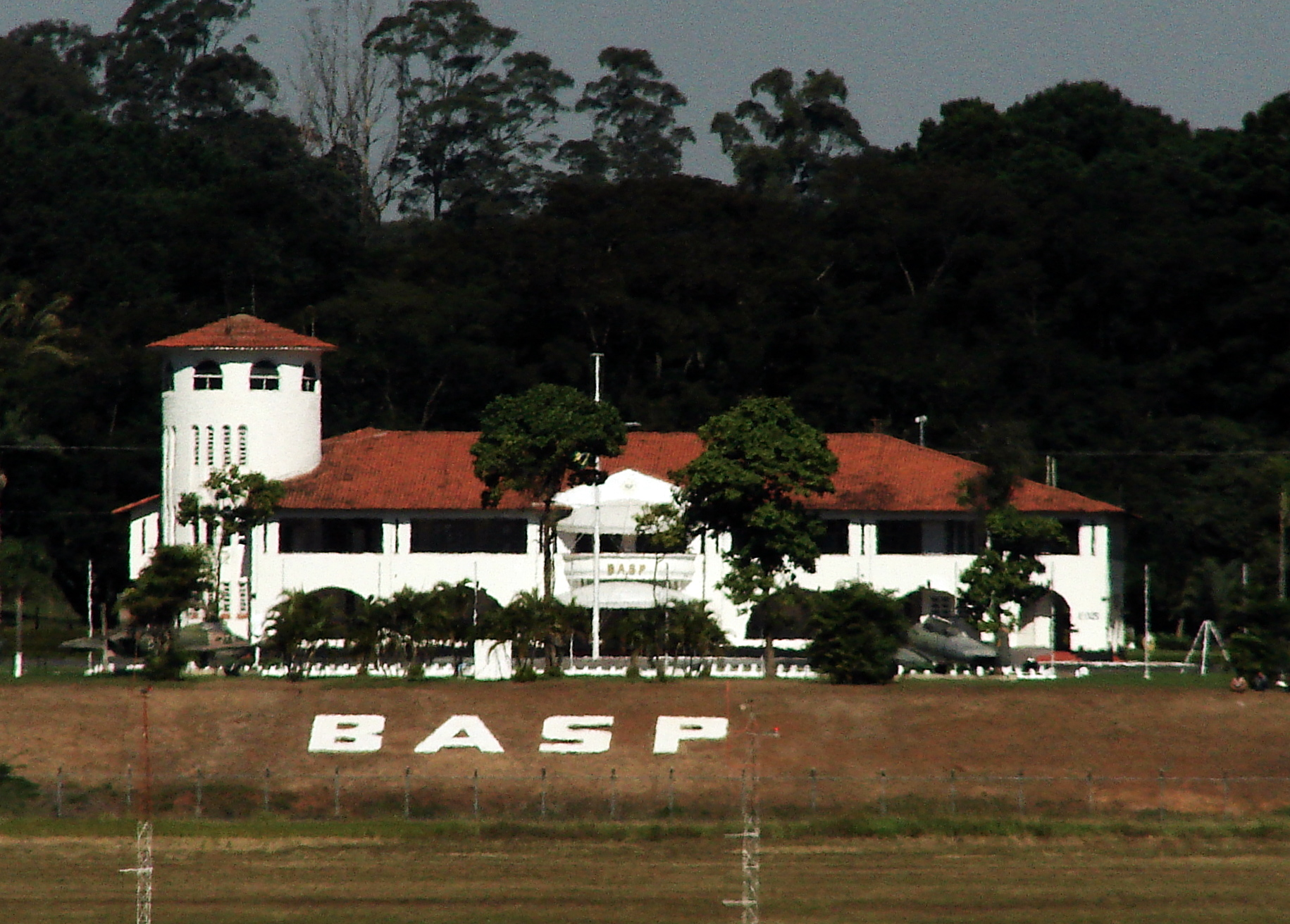
- São Paulo Air Force Base in 2010

Site information
- Type: Air Force Base
- Code: BASP
- Owner: Brazilian Air Force
- Controlled by: Brazilian Air Force
- Open to the public: No

Location
- Location in Brazil SBGR (Brazil)
- Coordinates: 23°26′08″S 46°28′23″W

Site history
- Built: 1945
- In use: 1945-present

Garrison information
- Current commander: Cel. Av. Fernando Campos Montenegro

Airfield information
- Identifiers: IATA: GRU, ICAO: SBGR, LID: SP0002
- Elevation: 750 metres (2,461 ft) AMSL
Runways
Direction	Length and surface
10R/28L	3,000 metres (9,843 ft) Asphalt
10L/28R	3,700 metres (12,139 ft) Asphalt

Base Aérea de São Paulo – BASP (IATA: GRU, ICAO: SBGR) is a base of the Brazilian Air Force, located in Guarulhos, Brazil.

It shares some facilities with Gov. André Franco Montoro International Airport.

== History ==
São Paulo Air Force Base was created on 22 May 1941 by Decree 3,302 at Campo de Marte Airport. On 26 January 1945 the base was transferred to its present location, then called Cumbica Farm.

== Units ==
Since January 2017 there are no permanent flying units assigned to São Paulo Air Force Base. Whenever needed, the aerodrome is used as a support facility to other air units of the Brazilian Air Force, Navy and Army.

Former Units
May 1969–January 2018: 4th Squadron of Air Transportation (4°ETA) Carajá. The squadron was deactivated on 10 January 2018 and aircraft and personnel transferred to the 3rd Squadron of Air Transportation (3°ETA) based at Santa Cruz Air Force Base.

== Access ==
The base is located 25 km from downtown São Paulo.

== Gallery ==
This gallery displays aircraft that have been based at São Paulo. The gallery is not comprehensive.

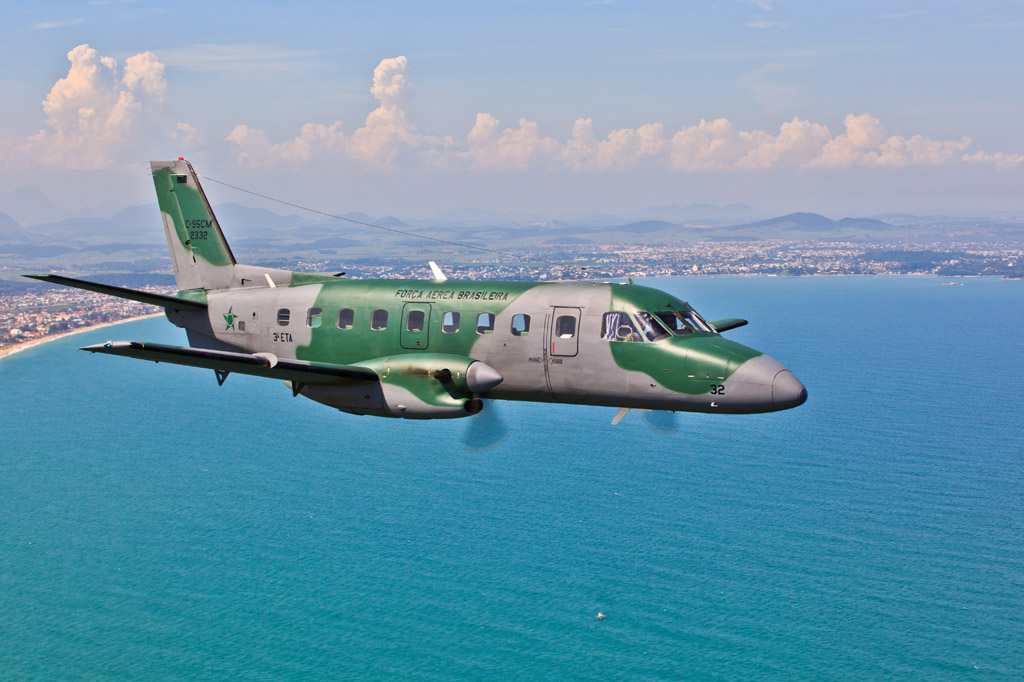
Embraer C-95B Bandeirante (FAB)

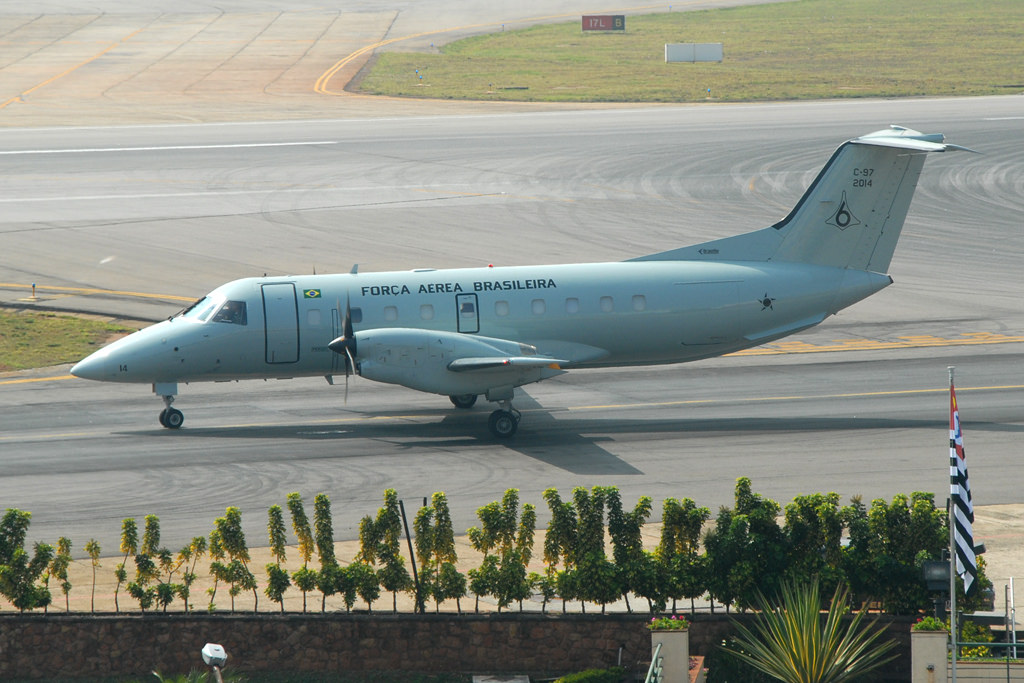
Embraer C-97 Brasília (FAB)

== See also ==
- List of Brazilian military bases
- Gov. André Franco Montoro International Airport
