= Torneio dos Campeões Amadores da Capital =

Campeonato Paulista de Futebol Amador do Estado
- Organiser(s): FPF
- Founded: 1942
- Abolished: 1969
- Region: (São Paulo (state)) São Paulo
- Qualifier for: Campeonato Paulista de Futebol Amador do Estado
- Related competitions: Campeonato de Futebol Amador de São Paulo
- Most championships: Laboratório Paulista de Biologia F.C. and A.A. Matarazzo (5 titles)

The Torneio dos Campeões Amadores da Capital (Tournament of Amateur Champions of the Capital of São Paulo in English) was an annual amateur super cup football tournament organised by FPF. Founded in 1942, it was contested by the winners of the main amateur club competitions in São Paulo at the time. The winner of the Torneio dos Campeões Amadores da Capital would compete against the winner of the Campeonato do Interior (the São Paulo State Interior Amateur Championship, for amateur teams from outside Greater São Paulo) for the title of Amateur Championship of the State of São Paulo.

From 1942 to 1958, the Torneio dos Campeões Amadores da Capital was contested among the winners of the Campeonato Amador da Capital (Capital Amateur Championship), the winners of the Campeonato Varzeano da Capital (Capital Amateur Varzea Championship), the winners of the Associação Classista de Esportes Atléticos (ACEA, Class Sports Athletic Association), and the winners of the Liga Esportiva de Comércio e Indústria (LECI, Sports League of Commerce and Industry).

After the merger of ACEA and LECI to create the Centro Paulista de Comércio e Indústria de Desportos (CPCID, Paulista Center for Commerce and Sports Industry) in 1959, it was contested by the winners of the Campeonato Amador da Capital, the winners of the Campeonato Varzeano da Capital, and the winners of the CPCID league.

After the discontinuation of the Campeonato Amador da Capital and the winners of the Campeonato Varzeano da Capital organized by FPF in the 1970s, the Torneio dos Campeões Amadores da Capital was abolished.

== Champions ==
Year	Winners	Runners-up	Ref
1942	Laboratório Paulista de Biologia F.C.	A.E.R. Recabo	
1943	Laboratório Paulista de Biologia F.C.	S.E. Palmeiras Amateur	
1944	S.E. Palmeiras Amateur	C.A. Departamento Estadual do Trabalho	
1945	S.E. Palmeiras Amateur	São Cristóvão F.C. do Itaim Bibi	
1946	SAMS F.C.	C.A. Ypiranga Amateur	
1947	S.E. Palmeiras Amateur	A.A.R. Vila Deodoro	
1948	Laboratório Paulista de Biologia F.C.	S.E. Palmeiras Amateur	
1949	Laboratório Paulista de Biologia F.C.	S.C. Corinthians Paulista Amateur	
1950	Laboratório Paulista de Biologia F.C.	S.C. Corinthians Paulista Amateur	
1951	A.A. Açucena do Limão	Jardim Europa F.C.	
1952	Acumuladores Durex F.C.	Laboratório Paulista de Biologia F.C.	
1953	Johnson Clube Brasil	A.A. Açucena do Limão	
1954	Johnson Clube Brasil	E.C. Sampaio Moreira do Tatuapé	
1955	A.A. Matarazzo	Vila Primavera F.C. do Tatuapé	
1956	CR Nitro-Química	E.C. Sampaio Moreira do Tatuapé	
1957	E.C. Sampaio Moreira do Tatuapé	Johnson Clube Brasil	
1958	E.C. Sampaio Moreira do Tatuapé	A.A. Matarazzo	
1959	Johnson Clube Brasil	E.C. Sampaio Moreira do Tatuapé	
1960	A.A. Matarazzo	E.C. Sampaio Moreira do Tatuapé	
1961	C.A. Pirelli	A.A. Açucena do Limão	
1962	A.E. Guarda Civil	A.A. Caramuru de Indianópolis	
1963	Gelomatic Clube	C.R. Vasco da Gama da Vila Matilde	
1964	A.A. Matarazzo	C.C.A.A. Guapira do Jaçanã	
1965	A.A. Matarazzo	A.A. Açucena do Limão	
1966	A.A. Matarazzo		
1967	A.E. Guarda Civil		
1968	C.A. Parque da Mooca	Máquinas Piratininga F.C.	
1969	C.A. Parque da Mooca	A.E. Guarda Civil	

== See also ==
- Amateur Football Championship of São Paulo
- São Paulo State Amateur Football Championship
