= List of mayors of Guarulhos =

The following is a list of mayors of the city of Guarulhos, in São Paulo state, Brazil.

- Joaquim Francisco de Paula Rabello, 1881-1890
- Antônio José de Siqueira Bueno, 1890-1891
- Lúcio Francisco Pereira, 1894-1896
- João Francisco da Silva Portilho, 1896-1902
- Leonardo Valtardi, 1902-1906
- João Teófilo de Assis Ferreira, 1906-1907
- Gabriel José Antônio, 1908-1915
- Felício Antônio Alves, 1915-1916
- Zeferino Pires de Freitas, 1917-1919
- José Maurício de Oliveira Sobrinho, 1919-1930
- João Eduardo da Silva, 1930-1931
- Delezino de Almeida Franco, 1930-1931
- Alberto Cardoso de Melo, 1931
- Ariovaldo Panadês, 1931-1932
- Alfredo Ferreira Paulino Filho, 1932-1933
- Carlos Panadês, 1933
- Guilhermino Rodrigues de Lima, 1933-1938
- Gentil Bicudo Contador, 1936, 1938, 1940, 1945
- José Saraceni, 1936-1938
- José Moreira Matos, 1938-1940
- José Maurício de Oliveira, 1940-1945
- Heitor Maurício de Oliveira, 1945-1947
- Vasco Elídio Egidio Brancaleoni, 1947
- João Mendonça Falcão, 1947
- Olivier Ramos Nogueira, 1947-1948
- Fioravante Iervolino, 1948-1952, 1957-1961
- Antônio Prátici, 1952-1953
- Rinaldo Poli, 1953-1957
- Mário Antonelli, 1961-1966
- Francisco Antunes Filho, 1962
- Waldomiro Pompêo, 1966-1970, 1973-1977
- Alfredo Antonio Nader, 1970
- Jean Pierre Hermann de Morais Barros, 1970-1973
- Nefi Tales, 1977-1982
- Rafael Rodrigues Filho, 1982-1983
- Oswaldo de Carlos, 1983-1988
- Paschoal Thomeu, 1988-1989
- Vicentino Papotto, 1993-1996
- Néfi Tales, 1997-1998
- Jovino Cândido, 1998-2000
- Elói Pietá, 2001-2008
- Sebastião Almeida, 2009-2016
- Guti, 2017-

== See also ==
- History of Guarulhos
- São Paulo history (state)
- History of São Paulo (state)
- List of mayors of largest cities in Brazil (in Portuguese)
