= 2013 South American Roller Hockey Clubs Championship =

Tournament details
- Host country: Chile
- Dates: 25–30 November
- Teams: 8 (from 1 confederation)
- Venue(s): (in Santiago host cities)

Final positions
- Champions: none

The South American Roller Hockey Clubs Championship was to be the 28th edition of the Roller Hockey South American Club Championship. It was held in November 2013 in Santiago, in Chile. The tournament was considered cancelled, after the illegalities committed during the tournament by the organization and the South American Roller Sports Confederation.

== Teams ==
(Brazil) Sport Recife (Title Holder)		
Petroleros/YPF (Argentina Champion)	CA Unión (Argentina Runner-up)	
(Colombia) Bufalos	(Colombia) Siete Rios	
(Chile) Liceo San Agustín	(Chile) Universidad Catolica	(Chile) Estudiantil San Miguel
