= Cinemais =

Cinema chain in Brazil

Cinemais is a cinema chain in Brazil. It operates in 11 cities, with 67 screens.

== Screens ==
Name	Mall	Established	No. of screens	Seating	City
Cinemais Anápolis	Brasil Park Shopping		5		Anápolis
Cinemais Cuiabá	Shopping 3 Américas		8		Cuiabá
Cinemais Guaratinguetá	Buriti Shopping Guará		4		Guaratinguetá
Cinemais Lorena	Eco Vale Shopping		4		Lorena
Cinemais Manaus Plaza Shopping	Manaus Plaza Shopping		8		Manaus
Cinemais Millennium Shopping	Millennium Shopping		8		Manaus
Cinemais Marília	Shopping Aquarius		5		Marília
Cinemais Patos de Minas	Pátio Central Shopping		3		Patos de Minas
Cinemais S. J. do Rio Preto			7		São José do Rio Preto
Cinemais Sertãozinho			2		Sertãozinho
Cinemais Tangará da Serra	Shopping Center Serra		2		Tangará da Serra
Cinemais Uberaba	Shopping Center Uberaba		6		Uberaba
Cinemais Uberlândia	Center Shopping		8		Uberlândia

- External links
- Cinemais official website
