= Our Lady of the Conception Cathedral, Guarulhos =

Our Lady of the Conception Cathedral
- Catedral Nossa Senhora da Conceiçao
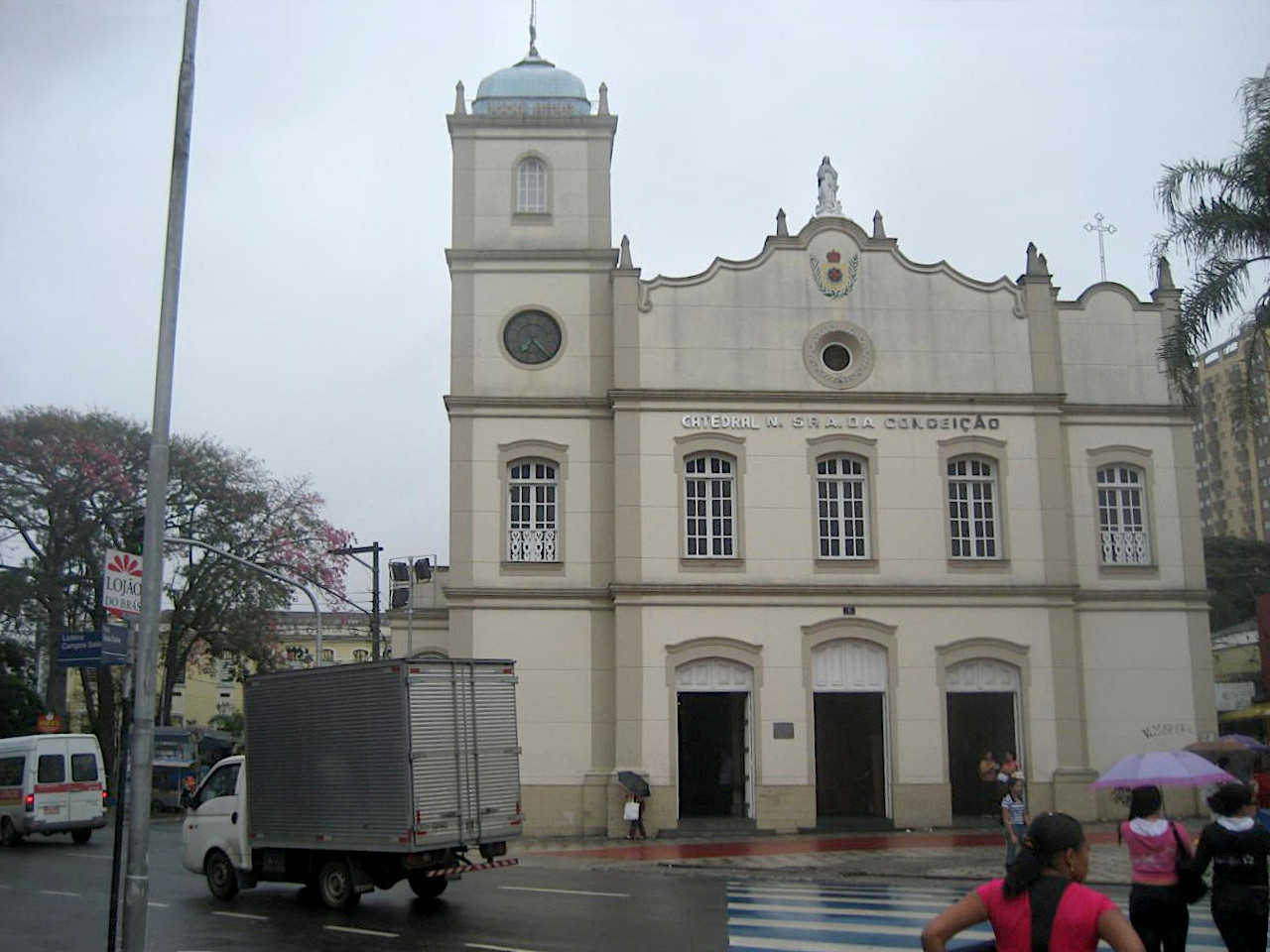
- Our Lady of the Conception Cathedral
- Location: Guarulhos
- Country: Brazil
- Denomination: Roman Catholic Church

The Our Lady of the Conception Cathedral (Portuguese: Catedral Nossa Senhora da Conceiçao), also known as Guarulhos Cathedral, is a religious building belonging to the Catholic Church. It was built in the year 1665 in the center of the city of Guarulhos in the South American country of Brazil. The Cathedral of Our Lady of the Conception is the headquarters of the Catholic Diocese of Guarulhos. Its architecture is one of the most beautiful in the state of São Paulo.

The cathedral has two communities:

- Cathedral of Our Lady of Conception - Tereza Cristina Square - Guarulhos Center
- Church of Our Lady of the Rosary of the Black Men (Igreja Nossa Senhora do Rosario dos Homens Pretos) - Rosario Square - Guarulhos Center

The current building is very contemporary. From its old structure in 1960 were created the two wide corridors known today. The altar has undergone many changes and even became moved forward, returning to its original position afterwards. Several of the changes in the church were also caused by the deterioration of the structure, which posed some risks.

== See also ==
- Roman Catholicism in Brazil
- Our Lady of the Immaculate Conception
