= 2010 FIRS Intercontinental Cup =

Tournament details
- Host country: Spain
- City: Reus
- Dates: March 21, 2010
- Teams: 2

Final positions
- Champions: (Spain) Reus Deportiu (1st title)
- Runners-up: (Argentina) CD Petroleros YPF

Tournament statistics
- Matches played: 1
- Goals scored: 5 (5 per match)

The 2010 FIRS Intercontinental Cup was the twelfth edition of the roller hockey tournament known as the Intercontinental Cup, played on March 21, 2010 at Reus, Spain. Reus Deportiu won the cup, defeating CD Petroleros YPF.

== Match ==
March 21, 2010
March 21, 2010	Reus Deportiu (Spain)	4 – 1	(Argentina) CD Petroleros YPF	Reus, Spain

== See also ==
- FIRS Intercontinental Cup
