= 2004 FIRS Intercontinental Cup =

Tournament details
- Host country: Spain
- City: Santiago de Compostela
- Dates: May 14–16, 2004
- Teams: 2

Final positions
- Champions: (Spain) HC Liceo La Coruña (4th title)
- Runners-up: (Argentina) CDU Estudiantil

Tournament statistics
- Matches played: 2
- Goals scored: 22 (11 per match)

The 2004 FIRS Intercontinental Cup was the eighth edition of the roller hockey tournament known as the Intercontinental Cup, played between 14 and 16 of May, 2004 (after a five-year hiatus). This edition rolled back to a two-legged final. HC Liceo La Coruña won the cup, defeating CDU Estudiantil.

== Matches ==
May 14, 2004
May 14, 2004	HC Liceo La Coruña (Spain)	9 – 1	(Argentina) CDU Estudiantil	Santiago de Compostela, Spain

May 16, 2004
May 16, 2004	HC Liceo La Coruña (Spain)	10 – 2	(Argentina) CDU Estudiantil	Santiago de Compostela, Spain

== See also ==
- FIRS Intercontinental Cup
