= 1989 FIRS Intercontinental Cup =

January, 3-4, 1989 FIRS Intercontinental Cup
Tournament details
- Host country: Spain
- City: A Coruña
- Dates: January, 1989
- Teams: 2

Final positions
- Champions: (Spain) HC Liceo La Coruña (2nd title)
- Runners-up: (Argentina) CDU Estudiantil

Tournament statistics
- Matches played: 2
- Goals scored: 25 (12.5 per match)

The 1989 FIRS Intercontinental Cup was the fourth edition of the roller hockey tournament known as the Intercontinental Cup, played in January 1989. HC Liceo La Coruña won the cup, defeating CDU Estudiantil.

== Matches ==
3 January 1989
3 January 1989	HC Liceo La Coruña (Spain)	11 – 4	(Argentina) CDU Estudiantil	A Coruña, Spain

4 January 1989
4 January 1989	HC Liceo La Coruña (Spain)	8 – 2	(Argentina) CDU Estudiantil	A Coruña, Spain

== See also ==
- FIRS Intercontinental Cup
