= 2015 South American Roller Hockey Clubs Championship =

The 2015 South American Roller Hockey Clubs Championship was to be the 30th edition of the Roller Hockey South American Club Championship. It was held in December 2015 in Club Ciudad, Buenos Aires, in Argentina.

== Final standings ==
Team
(Argentina) Huracán
(Argentina) Club Atletico Union
(Argentina) Centro Valenciano
(Argentina) Ciudad Buenos Aires
(Argentina) IMPSA
(Argentina) Estudiantil Porteno
(Argentina) Petroleros
(Argentina) San Lorenzo
(Argentina) Casa de Italia
(Argentina) GEBA
(Colombia) Manizales HC
(Chile) Leon Prado
(Chile) Thomas Bata
(Uruguay) Maldonado HPC
(Uruguay) Platense PC
(Uruguay) Pinamar HP
