= STZ TV =

STZ TV (ZYQ 880)
Sertãozinho, São Paulo; Brazil
- Channels: Digital: 41 (UHF); Virtual: 59

Programming
- Affiliations: TV Brasil

Ownership
- Owner: Fundação Cultural Educacional de Sertãozinho

History
- First air date: December 17, 2007
- Former channel number: 59 (analog)

Technical information
- Licensing authority: ANATEL
- ERP: 62 watts
- Transmitter coordinates: 21°9′15″S 47°56′50″W

Links
- Public license information: Profile
- Website: www.stztv.org.br

STZ TV (59.1 HD) is a noncommercial television channel broadcasting from Sertãozinho, state of São Paulo, Brazil. It has been on the air since 2008 and can also be watched online. An affiliate station of TV Brasil, STZ TV is owned by a local cultural foundation.
