= Savia dictyocarpa =

Scientific classification
- Kingdom: Plantae
- Clade: Tracheophytes
- Clade: Angiosperms
- Clade: Eudicots
- Clade: Rosids
- Order: Malpighiales
- Family: Phyllanthaceae
- Genus: Savia
- Species: S. dictyocarpa

Binomial name
- Savia dictyocarpa Müll.Arg.

Synonyms
- Kleinodendron riosulense L.B.Sm. & Downs

Species of flowering plant

Savia dictyocarpa is plant belonging to the family Phyllanthaceae, native to Brazil.

== Kleinodendron ==
The genus Kleinodendron was proposed in 1964 to contain a single species of woody plant, K. riosulense, from Santa Catarina, Brazil.

In 1982, however, botanist Grady Webster noted the similarity of those plants to S. dictyocarpa plants from Rio de Janeiro and São Paulo, and considered all three populations to be part of S. dictyocarpa. This conclusion has been accepted by subsequent authors. Savia has since been moved from the family Euphorbiaceae to the family Phyllanthaceae.
