= Guarulhos =

Municipality in the São Paulo Metropolitan Area

- Municipality
- Municipality of Guarulhos
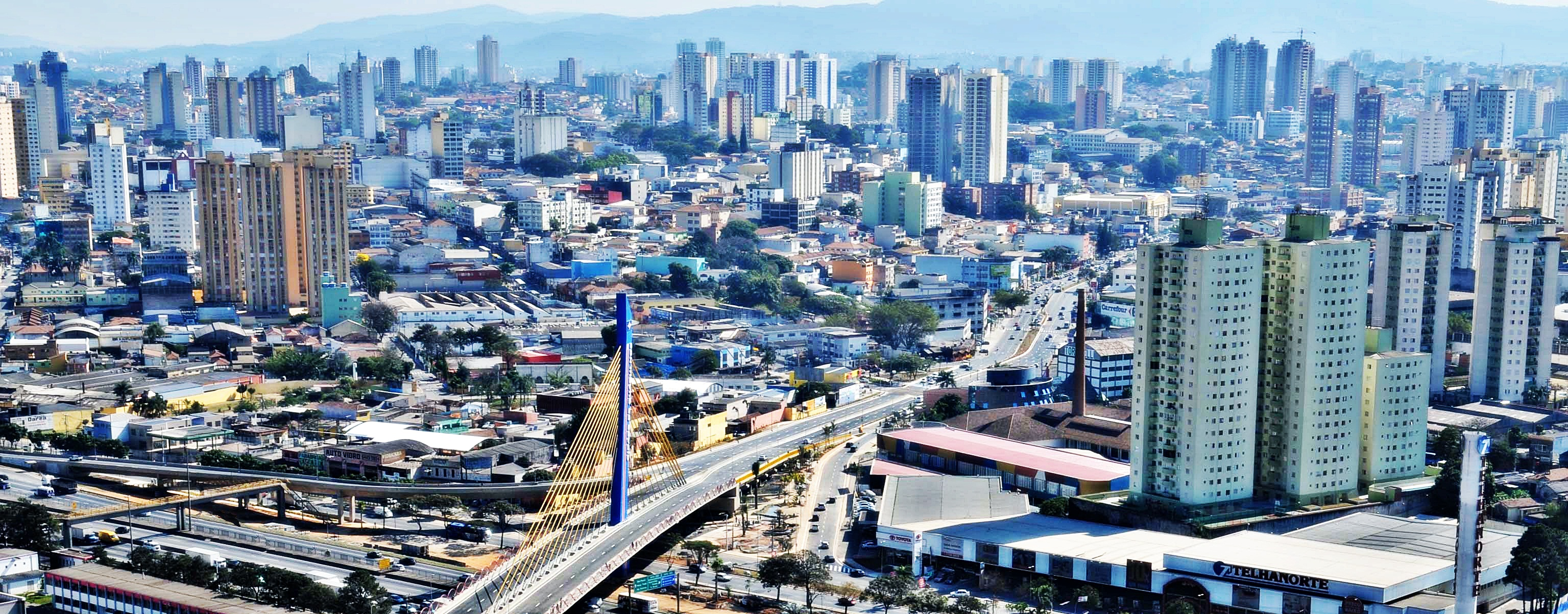
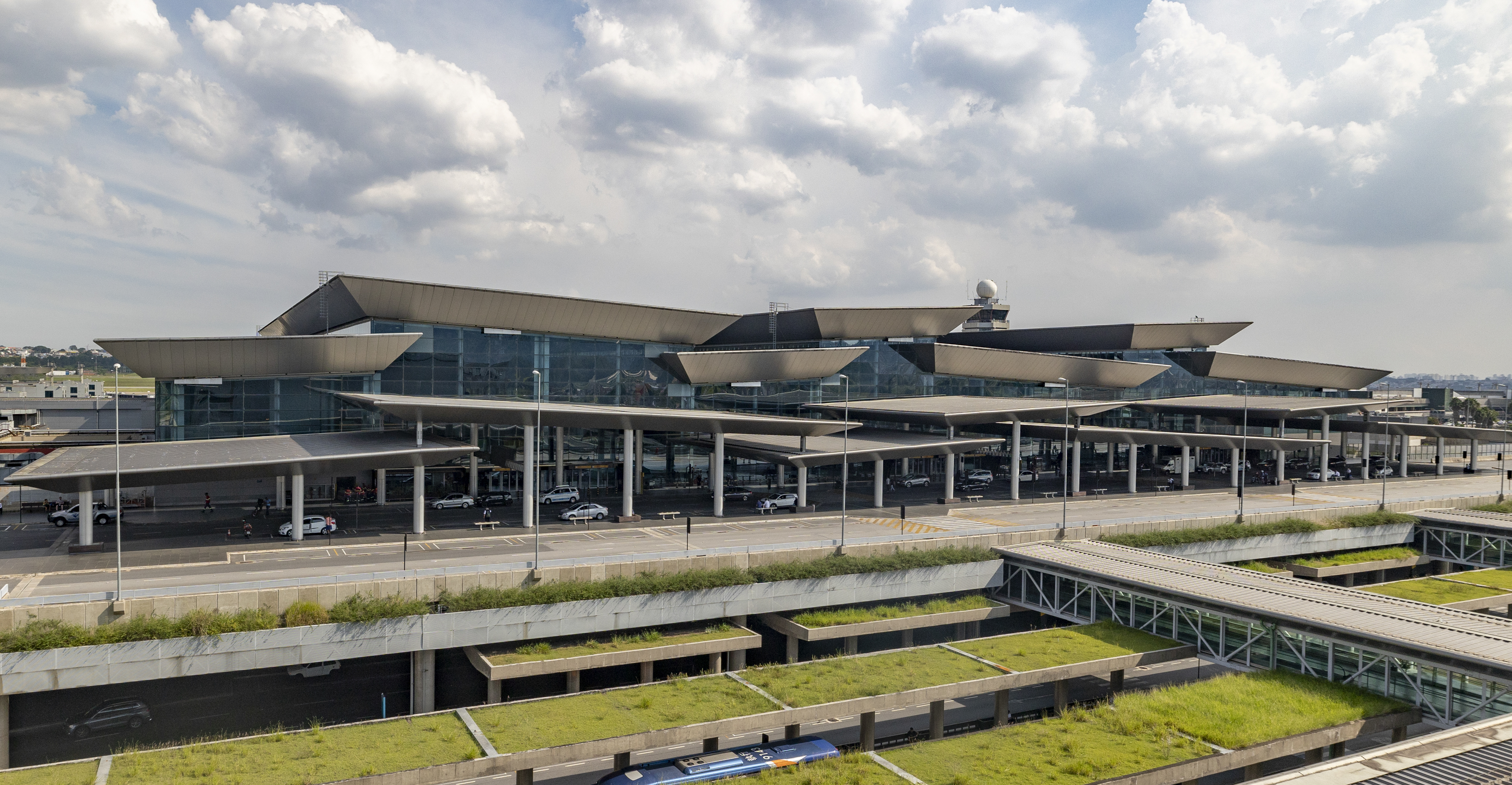
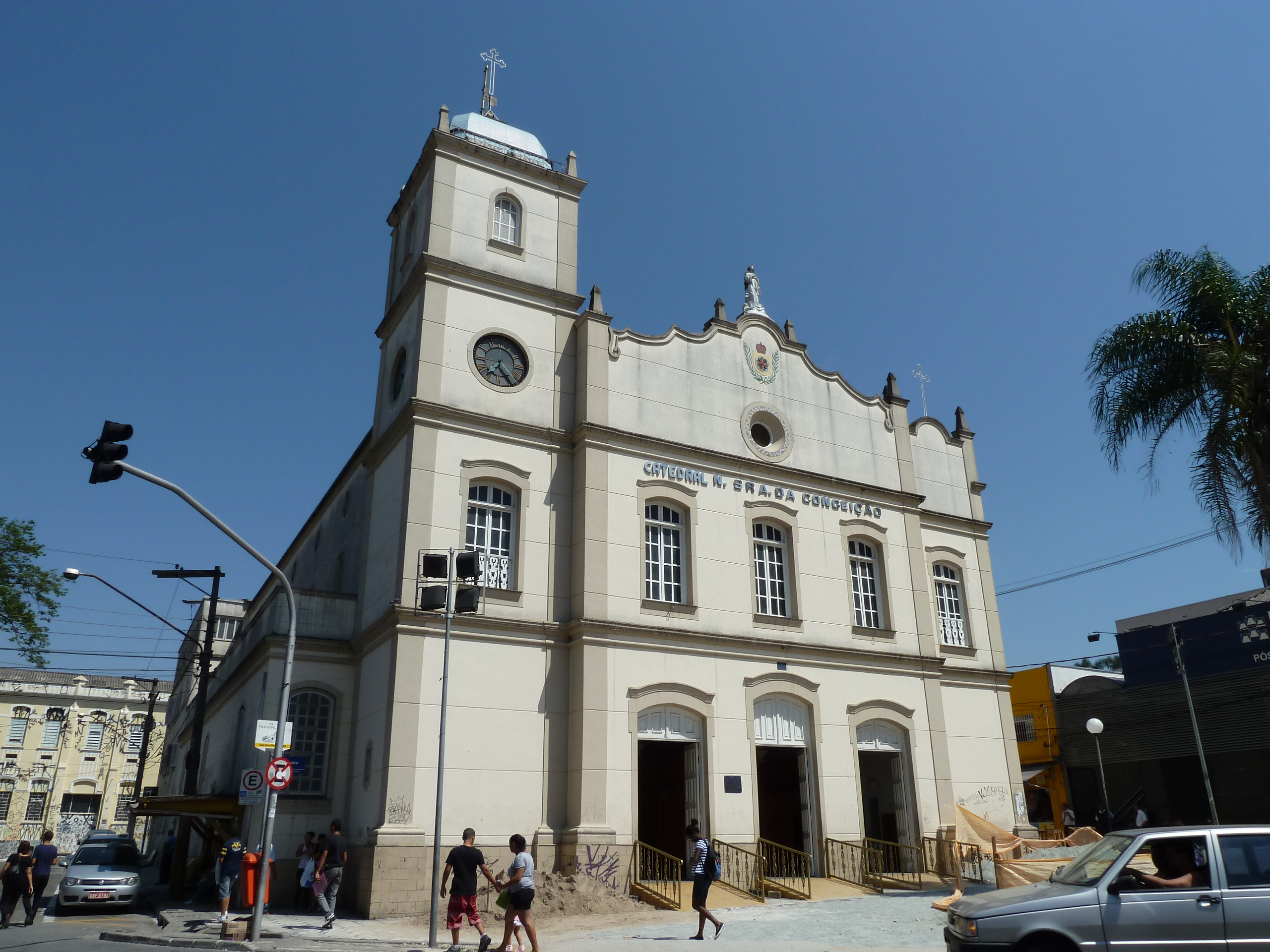
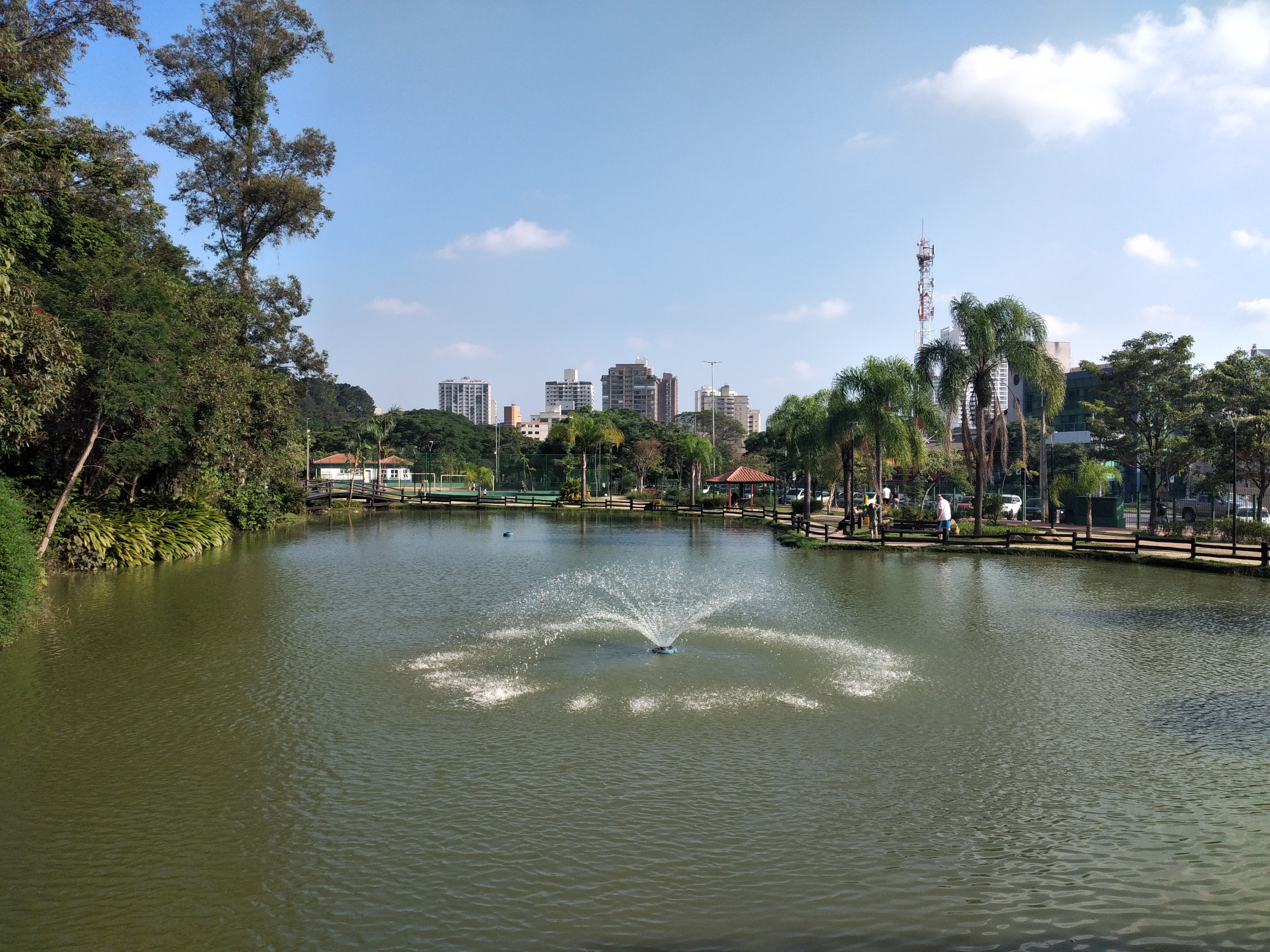
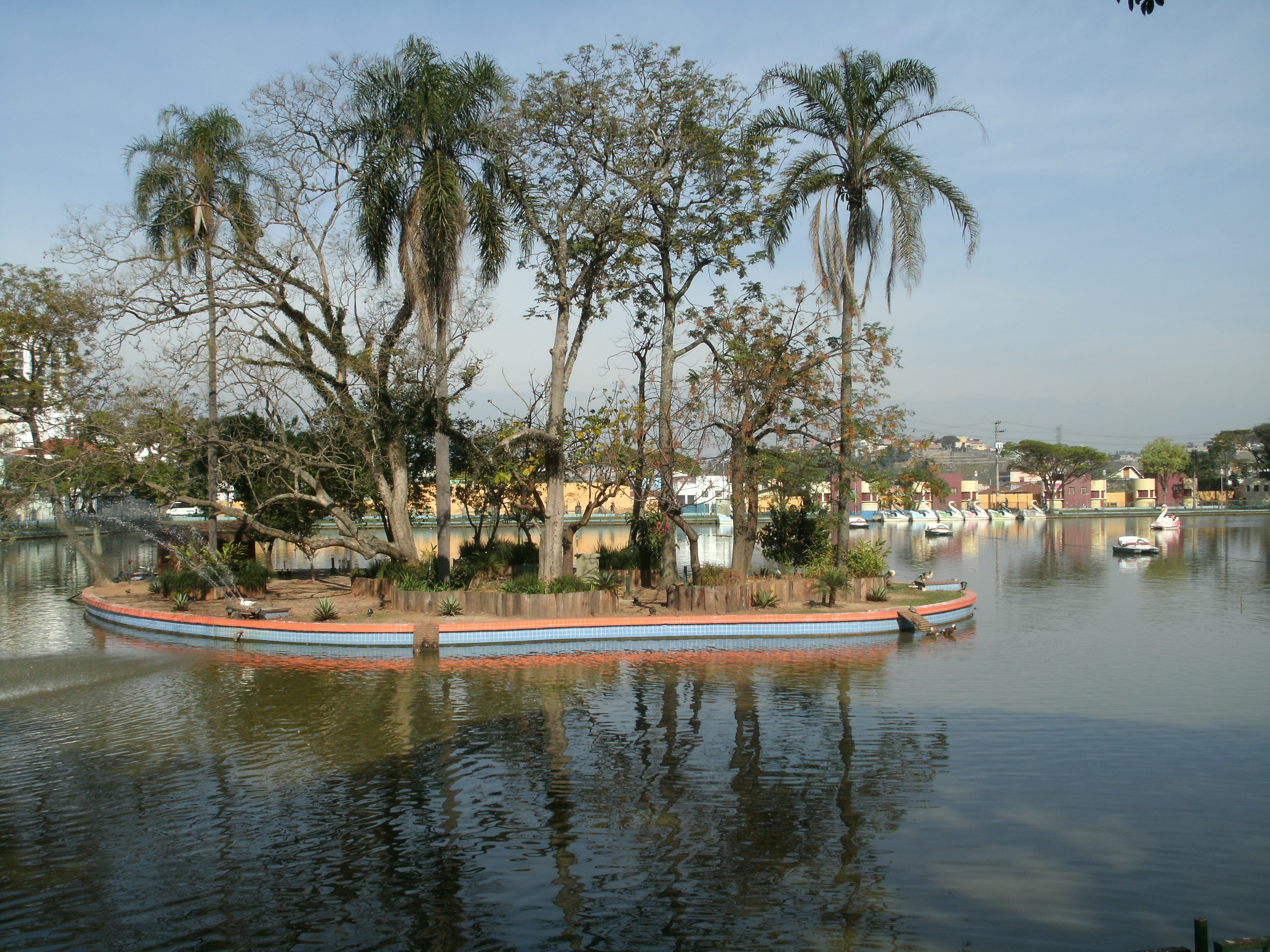
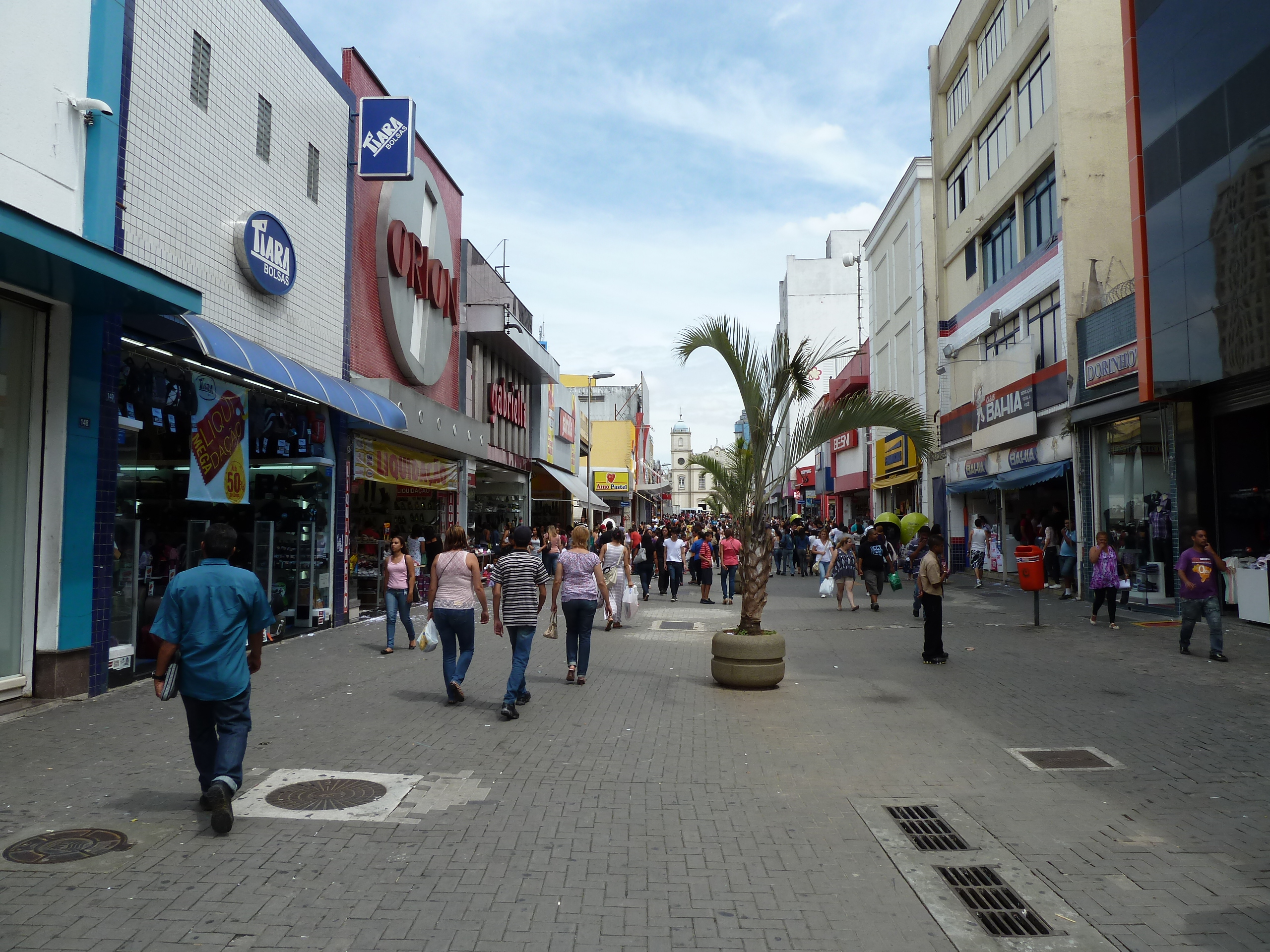
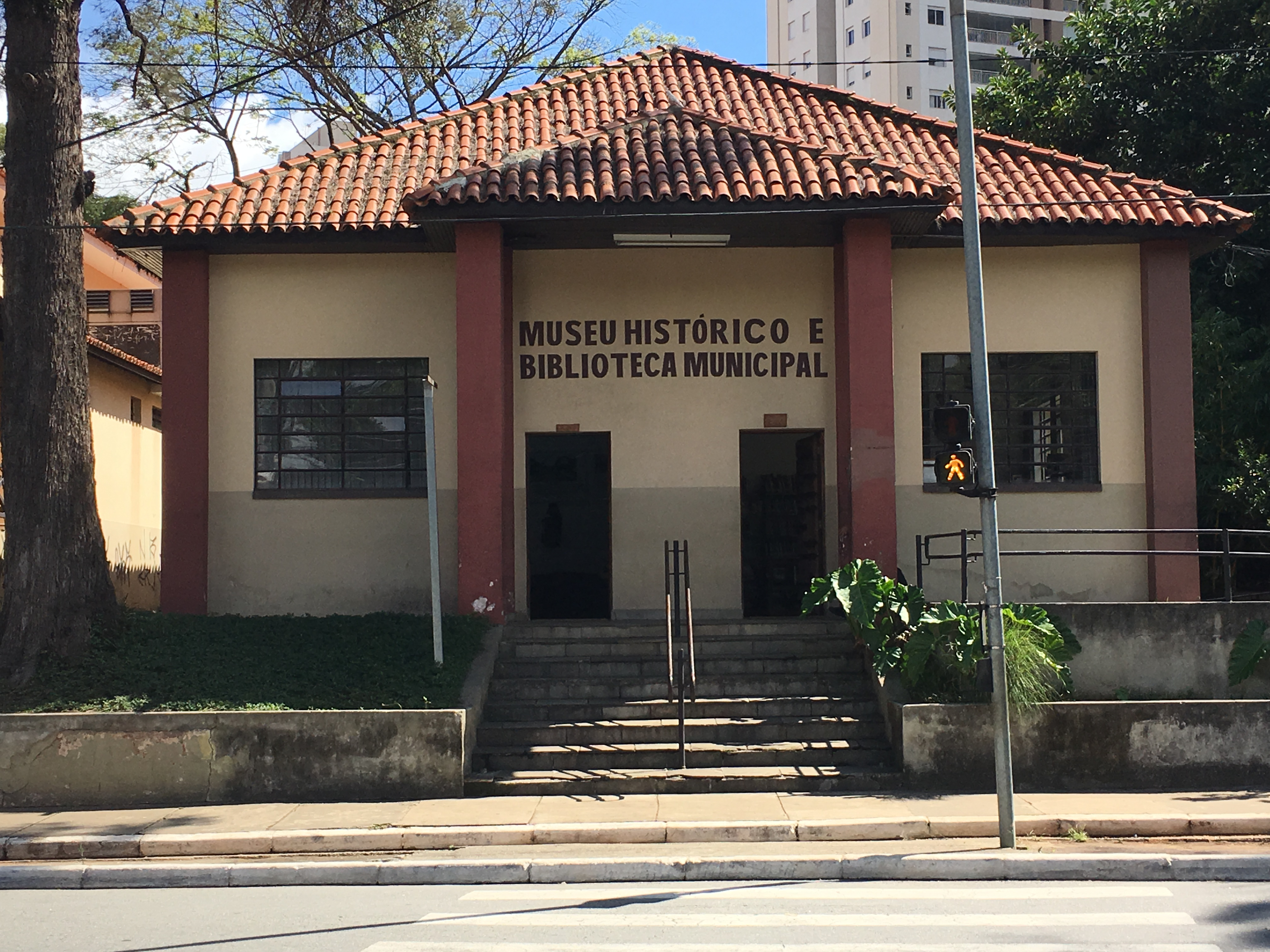
- Guarulhos Skyline São Paulo/Guarulhos International Airport Our Lady of the Conception Cathedral Bosque Maia Lago dos Patos Dom Pedro II Street Municipal History Museum of Guarulhos

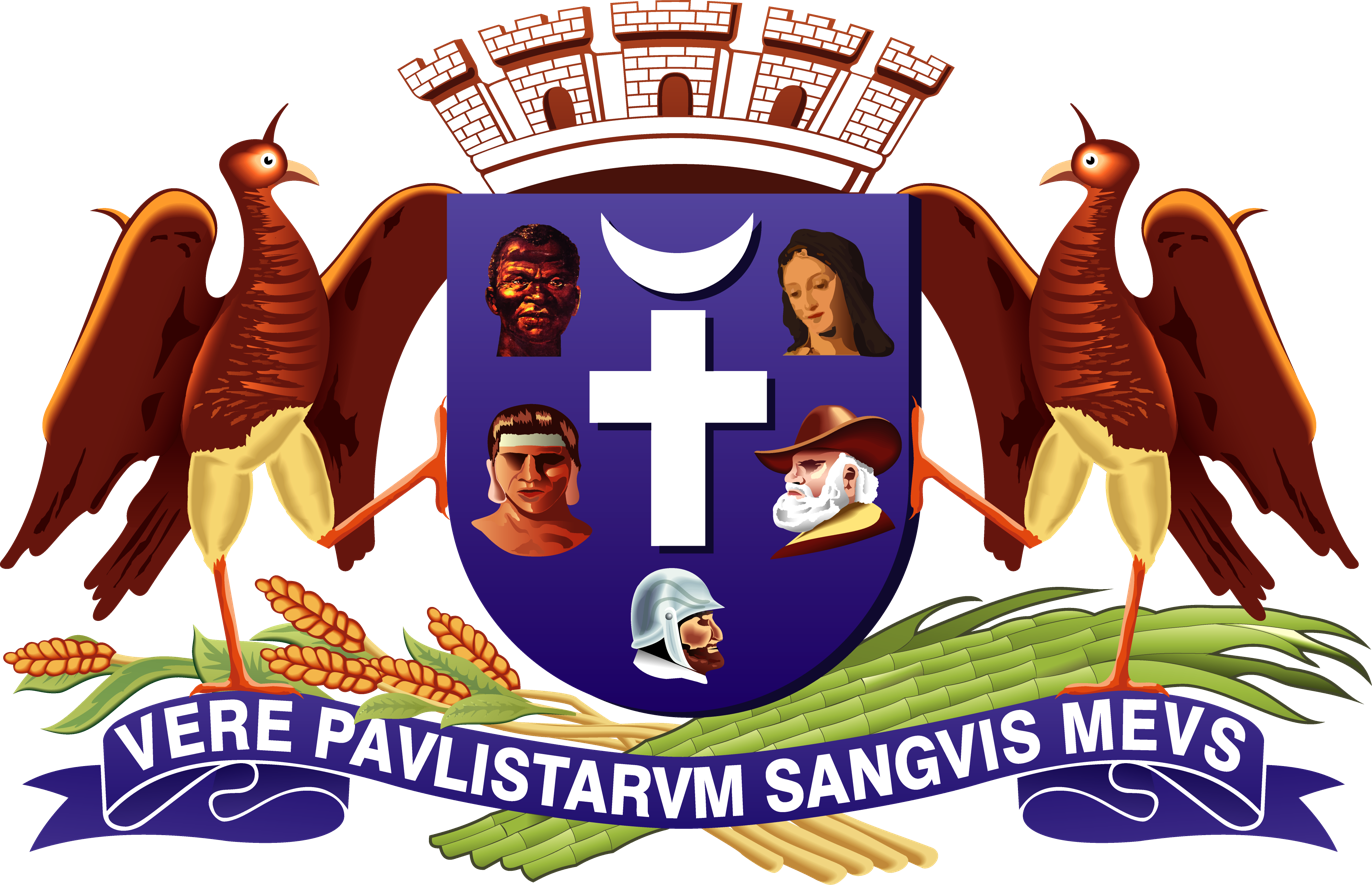
- Flag Coat of arms
- Nickname: Cidade Progresso ('Progress City')
- Motto(s): Vere paulistarum sanguis meus (Latin) ('My blood is genuinely from São Paulo')
- Location in São Paulo
- Coordinates: 23°27′46″S 46°31′58″W
- Country: Brazil
- Region: Southeast
- State: São Paulo
- Founded: December 8, 1560
- Founder: Manuel de Paiva
- Named for: Guarani Indigenous tribe

Government
  - Mayor: Lucas Sanches (PL)

Area
  - Municipality: 318.68 km^{2} (123.04 sq mi)
  - Urban: 156.52 km^{2} (60.43 sq mi)
- Elevation: 759 m (2,490 ft)

Population (2024)
  - Municipality: 1,345,364
  - Density: 4,221.7/km^{2} (10,934/sq mi)
- Time zone: UTC-3 (BRT)
- Postal Code: 07000-000
- Area code: +55 11
- HDI (2010): 0.763 – high
- Airport: São Paulo–Guarulhos International Airport
- Rapid Transit: CPTM Line 13
- Website: guarulhos.sp.gov.br

Guarulhos (/ɡwɑːˈruːljoʊs/ gwar-OO-lyohss; Brazilian Portuguese: [ɡwaˈɾuʎus]) is a city and municipality located in the Metropolitan Region of São Paulo, São Paulo state, Brazil. It is located northeast of the state capital, São Paulo. It is the second most populous city in the state of São Paulo, the 13th most populous city in Brazil, and the most populous city in the country that is not a state capital. Its population is 1,345,364 as of 2024, slightly above that of the nearby city of Campinas, with an area of 318.68 km^{2}.

== Overview ==
As of 2021, It ranked 10th by GDP among Brazilian cities and second in the state of São Paulo. It is the tenth largest suburb in the world. The GDP per capita for the municipality was R$55.084,22 as of 2021. The São Paulo/Guarulhos International Airport (GRU) is the primary airport serving São Paulo and is the largest airport in Brazil and South America. The city is the seat of the Roman Catholic Diocese of Guarulhos.

The municipality contains part of the 7,917-hectare (19,560-acre) Cantareira State Park, created in 1962, which protects a large part of the metropolitan São Paulo water supply. It also contains part of the 292,000-hectare (720,000-acre) Mananciais do Rio Paraíba do Sul Environmental Protection Area, created in 1982 to protect the sources of the Paraíba do Sul river.

== Etymology ==
According to José de Alcântara Machado de Oliveira, the name of the city derives from the name of the indigenous people who inhabited the region, the Guaramomis or Maromomins, which means "Eaters" or "big-bellied people" in the Tupi Language. The name of the indigenous settlement founded in 1595 that gave rise to the city was 'Conceição dos Guarulhos', in reference to Our Lady of the Conception.

== History ==
Guarulhos was founded on December 8, 1560, by Jesuit priest Manuel de Paiva and named Nossa Senhora da Conceição. Its origin is linked to five other small villages that were in charge of defending the boundaries of São Paulo de Piratininga Village against the Tamoios, a tribe of Indigenous people that lived in that region.

In the sixteenth century, Guarulhos was a strategic location: it bordered the future São Paulo's Capital and was surrounded by the Tietê (south), and Cabuçu de Cima (west) rivers. For similar reasons, São Miguel Village (now the São Miguel Paulista District in São Paulo) was established during the same period.

In 1880, Guarulhos separated from São Paulo and was named Nossa Senhora da Conceição dos Guarulhos. Its current name, Guarulhos, was adopted later, after the enactment of the law #1.021, on November 6, 1906.

The early 20th century was marked by the arrival of the railway and electricity (Light & Power), requests for the installation of the telephone network, licences for the establishment of industries and commercial activities, and passenger transport services.

During the 1930s, the city witnessed the actions of the Federal Intervention and the Constitutional Movement (Reflections of the Revolution that marked the end of the "Old Republic" during the 1930s in Brazil).

In 1940 the Monteiro Lobato Municipal Library was founded, in 1941, the first Health Center of the city, and ten years after that, the Holy House of Mercy of Guarulhos was established. On that decade arrive in the municipality industries from different sectors: electricity; metallurgy; plastics; food; rubber; footwear; vehicles; clocks, and leather.

In 1945 the São Paulo's Air Force Base (BASP) was transferred from Campo de Marte, a small airport in São Paulo, to the Cumbica neighborhood in Guarulhos.

In 1958 the Rotary Club established a branch in the city.

The Municipal Conservatory of Guarulhos was founded in 1961.

In 1963 the Commercial & Industrial Association of Guarulhos was founded, nowadays called the Commerce & Business Association of Guarulhos, Associação Comercial e Empresarial de Guarulhos – ACE.

With the big boom of the Industrial sector, a large number of manpower was drawn into the city. This new population settled in an urban area on a continuous process of land occupation. At this rate the population grew from 35,000 in 1950 to 101,000 in 1960, from 237,000 in 1970 to 532,726 in 1980. Most of these citizens devoted themselves to Industrial activities in Guarulhos (that hosts around 2,000 establishments), and São Paulo.

In 1985 the Cumbica Airport was opened. Today it is called "International Airport of São Paulo–Guarulhos Governor André Franco Montoro" (Aeroporto Internacional de São Paulo–Guarulhos Governador André Franco Montoro), the second-biggest airport in Latin America.

Between 2000 and 2006, its population grew three times as much as São Paulo State. According to IBGE, Guarulhos is the second most populous city in the State after São Paulo's capital. Most of its population is economically active and evenly distributed in terms of gender.

== Demographics ==
Historical population (municipality)
Year	Population	%±
1920	5,961
1940	13,439	125.4%
1950	34,683	158.1%
1960	101,273	192.0%
1970	236,811	133.8%
1980	532,724	125.0%
1991	787,866	47.9%
2000	1,072,717	36.2%
2010	1,221,979	13.9%
2022	1,291,771	5.7%

== Notable people ==
- Rebeca Andrade, gymnast
- Natália Araujo, brazilian indoor volleyball player, World Championship runner-up
- Marques Batista de Abreu, footballer and, beginning in 2011, politician
- Cris, footballer
- Edson Ribeiro, sprinter
- Mamonas Assassinas, rock band from the 1990s
- David Braz, footballer
- Gabriel Martinelli, footballer
- Jaimerson Xavier, footballer.
- David da Silva, footballer.
- Vinícius Silvestre, footballer.
- Any Gabrielly, singer, actress, dancer, and model
- Diogo Moreira, motorcycle racer

== Climate ==
Climate is characterized by relatively high temperatures and evenly distributed precipitation throughout the year. The Köppen Climate Classification subtype for this climate is "Cwa" (Humid Subtropical Climate).

Climate data for Guarulhos (1981–2010)
Month	Jan	Feb	Mar	Apr	May	Jun	Jul	Aug	Sep	Oct	Nov	Dec	Year
Mean daily maximum °C (°F)	29.2 (84.6)	29.4 (84.9)	28.5 (83.3)	26.9 (80.4)	23.9 (75.0)	23.0 (73.4)	22.8 (73.0)	24.5 (76.1)	24.8 (76.6)	26.6 (79.9)	27.6 (81.7)	28.4 (83.1)	26.3 (79.3)
Daily mean °C (°F)	23.4 (74.1)	23.5 (74.3)	22.8 (73.0)	21.3 (70.3)	18.5 (65.3)	17.1 (62.8)	16.6 (61.9)	17.8 (64.0)	18.8 (65.8)	20.4 (68.7)	21.5 (70.7)	22.5 (72.5)	20.4 (68.7)
Mean daily minimum °C (°F)	19.1 (66.4)	19.2 (66.6)	18.6 (65.5)	17.1 (62.8)	14.3 (57.7)	12.5 (54.5)	12.0 (53.6)	12.7 (54.9)	14.1 (57.4)	15.8 (60.4)	16.9 (62.4)	18.1 (64.6)	15.9 (60.6)
Average precipitation mm (inches)	210.1 (8.27)	224.9 (8.85)	203.9 (8.03)	86.6 (3.41)	79.0 (3.11)	41.7 (1.64)	10.5 (0.41)	10.1 (0.40)	88.9 (3.50)	122.5 (4.82)	134.8 (5.31)	226.8 (8.93)	1,439.8 (56.68)
Average precipitation days (≥ 1.0 mm)	16	14	14	7	7	4	4	3	7	9	10	15	110
Average relative humidity (%)	75.4	75.5	75.5	74.6	75.9	75.4	74.1	69.9	72.6	73.7	73.0	75.0	74.2
Mean monthly sunshine hours	141.1	136.6	156.1	162.1	157.5	155.2	162.0	169.9	127.2	138.2	145.2	139.5	1,790.6
Source: Instituto Nacional de Meteorologia

== Transportation ==
The main highway serving Guarulhos is the Rodovia Presidente Dutra, from São Paulo to Rio de Janeiro.

In 2018, the Companhia Paulista de Trens Metropolitanos commuter rail system's Line 13–Jade was opened, connecting the São Paulo–Guarulhos International Airport with the Engenheiro Goulart station. In 2021, construction was to begin on the first line of the São Paulo Metro to serve Guarulhos, Line 19–Sky Blue.

São Paulo Air Force Base - BASP, a base of the Brazilian Air Force, is located in Guarulhos.

== Media ==
In telecommunications, the city was served by Telecomunicações de São Paulo. In July 1998, this company was acquired by Telefónica, which adopted the Vivo brand in 2012. The company is currently an operator of cell phones, fixed lines, internet (fiber optics/4G) and television (satellite and cable).

== See also ==
- List of municipalities in São Paulo
