= Sertãozinho =

- Municipality
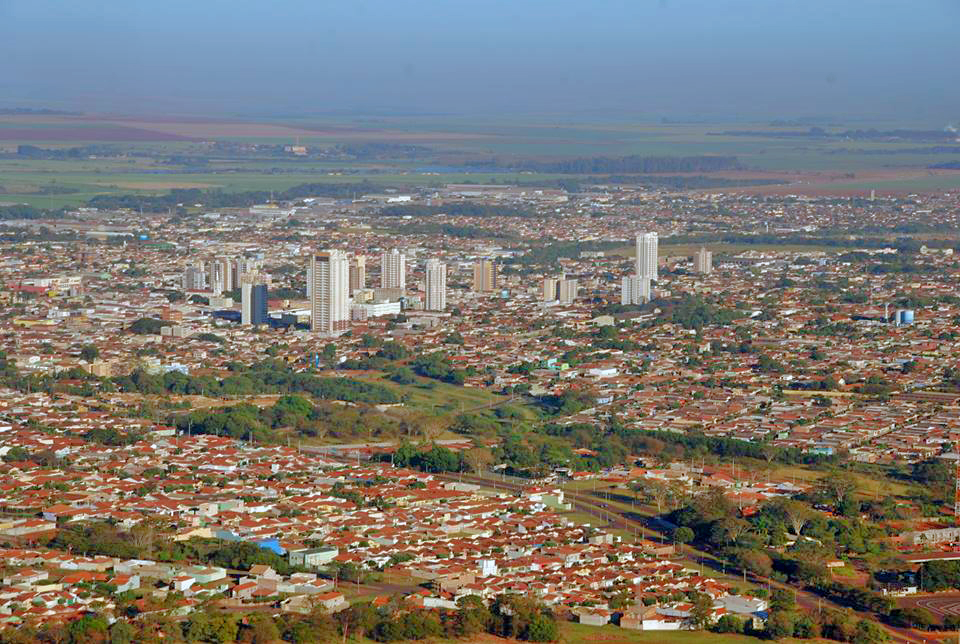

- Flag Coat of arms

- Location in São Paulo state

- Location in Brazil
- Coordinates: 21°8′17″S 47°59′26″W
- Country: Brazil
- Region: Southeast
- State: São Paulo

Area
  - Total: 403 km^{2} (156 sq mi)
- Elevation: 579 m (1,900 ft)

Population (2022 Census)
  - Total: 126,887
  - Estimate (2025): 132,176
  - Density: 315/km^{2} (815/sq mi)
- Time zone: UTC-03:00 (BRT)
  - Summer (DST): UTC-02:00 (BRST)
- Postal code: 16000-000
- Website: www.sertaozinho.sp.gov.br

Sertãozinho is a Brazilian municipality in the state of São Paulo. The population in 2020 was about 127,142. Its area is 403 km^{2}. The municipality consists of Sertãozinho city and two districts: Cruz das Posses and Vila Garcia. Sertãozinho is 325 km from São Paulo and 702 km from Brasília.

== History ==
In 1877, a settlement at Sertãozinho was founded on 148 acres (0.60 km^{2}) of land belonging to local farming estates. The land holders involved included Antonio Pedroso Malachi, Antonio Jose Rodrigues, Manoel Jacinto Bridge and Father Chico of Africa. Malachi, whose estate was called "Vila Nossa Senhora Aparecida", donated about 12 acres (49,000 m^{2}) of land which was divided amongst tenant farmers. He built a chapel dedicated to the Blessed Virgin Mary (located at 21 de Abril Plaza).

On 10 March 1885, under law 31, the village was made a district of peace. On 5 December 1896, the village was made a town and named Ali Sertãozinho by law 463. This was ratified on 21 April 1897. On 26 October 1906, under law 1018, the district was founded and ratified on 12 December 1906. The name of the municipality has changed over time, including, Capela de Sertãozinho, Engenho de Nossa Senhora Aparecida do Sertaozinho, Aparecida de Sertãozinho, and its current name, Sertãozinho. The first municipal magistrate was Renato Silveira da Motta.

For many years, the main industry of the municipality was coffee production. However, the coffee fields became exhausted and the land was sold to colonos (former colonists) and investors who planted cotton. By 1920, Sertãozinho was one of the top ten cotton producing areas in Brazil.

In 1928, although union membership was illegal in Brazil, communist entities organised dissident workers on the larger coffee plantations in Sertãozinho.

In the 1930s, traditional labour was replaced by gangs of labourers for hire, organised by labour contractors and communists.

After World War II, cotton crops became less profitable and sugar cane was planted in Sertaozinho. In the 1960s, Sertaozinho was again a center of conflicted labour relations in Brazil when sugar cane cutters and mill workers threatened to strike over pay.

== Geography ==
Sertãozinho is located about 20 km to the west of the town of Ribeirão Preto in the northern part of the state of São Paulo. The area of Sertãozinho is 418,803 km^{2} in total, metropolitan 265 km^{2} and rural 253,118 km^{2}. Sertãozinho is approximately 340 kilometres (210 mi) from the state capital, São Paulo.

== Demographics ==
Historical population
Year	Pop.	±%
1896	12,455	—
1900	28,243	+126.8%
1940	48,609	+72.1%
1960	61,287	+26.1%
1980	88,245	+44.0%
2000	94,560	+7.2%
2010	110,094	+16.4%

In the 2000 Brazil census, the total population of Sertãozinho was 110,999. 1,664 people lived in the rural part of the municipality. More than half the population of Sertãozinho is of Italian descent. Other ethnic groups include Spanish, Lebanese, Syrian, Portuguese, African, Germans and Japanese. White Brazilians make up 78.7% of the population, Afro Brazilians 4.2% and Asian Brazilians 0.8%. Pardos (Mixed race people) make up 15.7%.

== Media ==
Sertãozinho has a number of radio stations, television stations and periodicals. The FM radio stations include Nativa, Conquista, VIP, Mais, Nova Gospel, Comunitária, Novo Milênio, and Boa Vontade. The television stations include STZ TV, TVE Sertãozinho (educational), Rede de Televisão Boa vontade and TV Câmara Sertãozinho. The periodicals include Agora Sertãozinho, Momento, Momento Atual, Pinga Fogo, Classificados and Cia and Jornal do Farol.

== Urban development ==
In the south of the township, there are several condominiums and stores on Avenida Atilio Balbo, the Anhanguera University and a campus of the Institute of São Paulo. In the eastern part of the township are the Ceagesp vegetables and grains market, schools and a sports complex. In the northern part, there are parks such as the Gustavo Simioni ecological park. In the western part is a large sugar mill. In the downtown area is the Savegnago supermarket on Avenida Antônio Paschoal. There are a number of shopping precincts including the Baron gallery.

== Transportation ==
The only active railway in the northeastern São Paulo state is in Sertãozinho. It is a tourist attraction.

== Economy ==
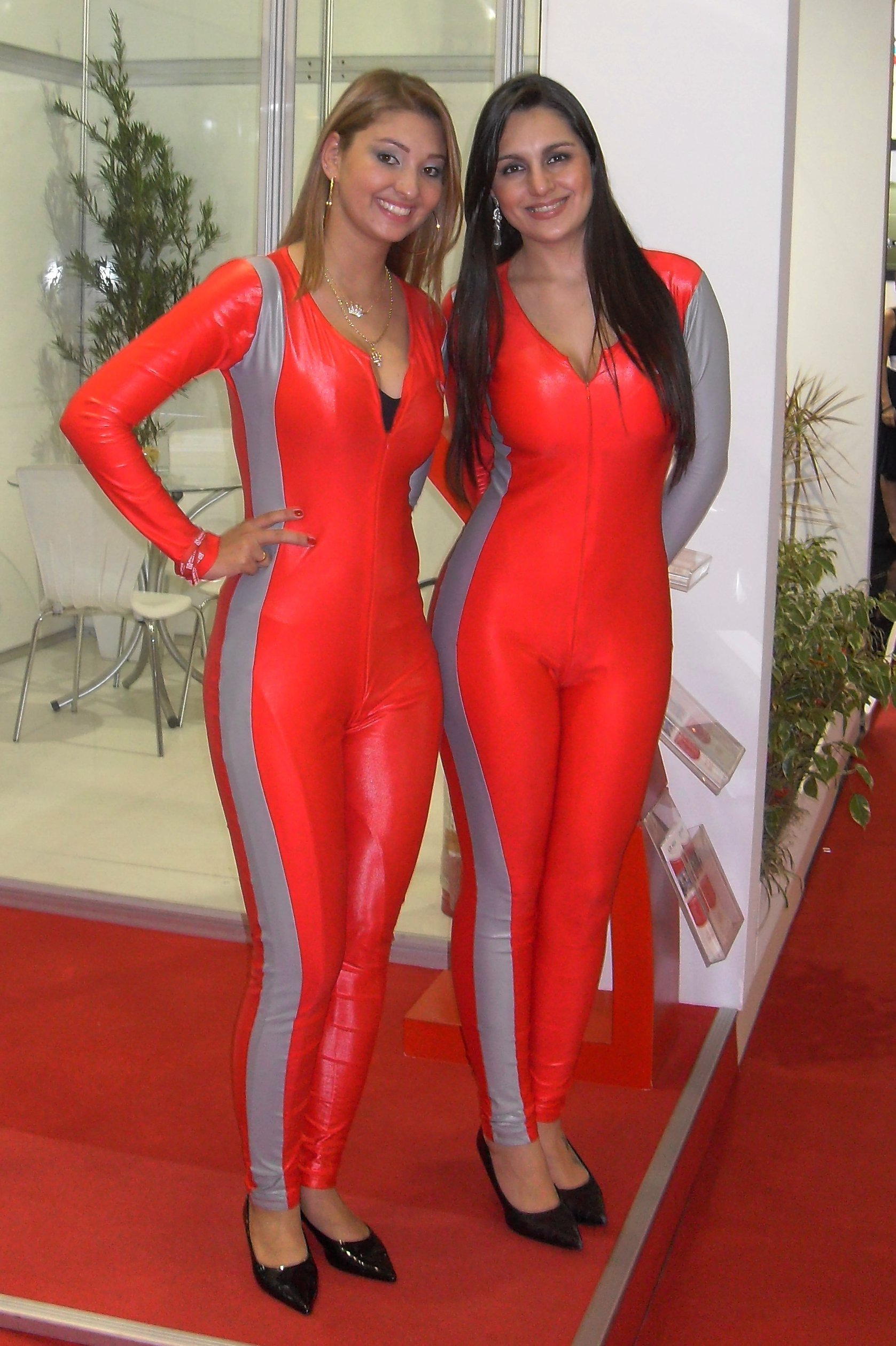
Promotional models at the Fenasucro fair, 2010

Sertãozinho is a major producer of ethanol. In September, the township hosts an annual sugarcane and ethanol production technology fair. It is sponsored by Fenasucro and Agrocana.

Sertãozinho has more than 500 industrial plants. Its Human Development Index (HDI) is 0,833.

== Media ==
In telecommunications, the city was served by Companhia Telefônica Brasileira until 1973, when it began to be served by Telecomunicações de São Paulo. In July 1998, this company was acquired by Telefónica, which adopted the Vivo brand in 2012.

The company is currently an operator of cell phones, fixed lines, internet (fiber optics/4G) and television (satellite and cable).

== Sports ==
Popular sports in Sertãozinho are football and roller hockey. Sertãozinho Futebol Clube is the local soccer team, and Sertãozinho Hóquei Clube is the roller hockey club. Sertãozinho Hóquei Clube has won several national titles. There are a number of sports stadiums including: the Frederick Dalmaso stadium, able to hold 2,100 people; the Adelino Furtado Simioni, able to hold 1,000 people; the Arnaldo Bonini stable, able to hold 500 people; and the Comendador Alcídio Balbo stadium, able to hold 1,500 people. Sports centers were built for the 2016 Summer Olympics. These included: the Silvério Selli center; the Edgard Dega Gonçalves center; and the Maria Rodrigues Zeferina Baldaia center.

== Culture ==
The Adami Faria de Aguiar Municipal Theatre is one of the largest in Brazil. There is a Cinemais theatre.

== Governance ==
Sertãozinho has four city hall offices: Ferroviário Paschoal; Parque dos Ipês; Vila Garcia; and Cruz das Posses.

== Notable people ==
- Éder Militão, footballer

== See also ==
- List of municipalities in São Paulo
- Interior of São Paulo
