= Roller Hockey South American Club Championship =

- Founded: 1982
- Region: Pan-America (World Skate America - Rink Hockey)
- Teams: 8
- Current champions: (Argentina) Concepción Patín Club
- Most championships: (Argentina) Estudantil (8 titles)
- 2018 Pan-American Roller Hockey Club Championship

The Pan-American Roller Hockey Club Championship is an annual roller hockey club competition organized by World Skate America - Rink Hockey with the most successful teams of the America. Since its foundation the Argentina teams have dominated the competition. Until 2013 and in 2015 and 2016 it was organized by the South American Skating Confederation (CSP), in 2017 it was organized by the Pan-American Skating Confederation and since 2018 it has been organized by World Skate America - Rink Hockey.

The 2013 edition was considered cancelled, after the illegalities committed during the tournament by the organization (CSP) and the South American Roller Sports Confederation. Due to a crisis in the South American Skating Confederation, the 2014 edition was organized by the Argentinian Federation, while in 2015 and 2016 it was again organized by the South American Skating Confederation. In 2017 it was organized by the Pan-American Skating Confederation. Since 2018 it has been organized by World Skate America - Rink Hockey.

== Winners ==
Season	City Host	Winner	Runner-up	3rd place
1982	(Argentina) San Juan	(Brazil) Sertãozinho	(Argentina) Club San Martín	(Argentina) Estudantil
1983	(Brazil) Sertãozinho	(Argentina) Concepción	(Chile) CE Manuel de Salas	(Brazil) Sertãozinho
1984	(Argentina) San Juan	(Argentina) UVT	(Argentina) Concepción	(Argentina) Club San Martín
1985	(Brazil) Sertãozinho	(Brazil) Sertãozinho	(Argentina) UVT	(Argentina) Club Atlético Huracán
1986	(Argentina) San Juan	(Argentina) Concepción	(Argentina) UVT	(Brazil) Sertãozinho
1987	(Chile) Santiago	(Argentina) UVT	(Argentina) Estudantil	(Argentina) Unión Social San Juan
1988	(Brazil) Sertãozinho	(Argentina) Estudantil	(Brazil) Sertãozinho	(Argentina) Concepción
1989	(Argentina)	(Argentina) Concepción	(Argentina) UVT	(Brazil) Smar Hóquei Clube
1990	(Chile) Santiago	(Argentina) UVT	(Brazil) Sertãozinho	(Brazil) Portuguesa
1991	(Brazil) Recife	(Brazil) Sertãozinho	(Argentina) Unión Social San Juan	(Argentina) Estudantil
1992	(Argentina)	(Argentina) Estudantil	(Argentina) Unión Social San Juan	(Argentina) Concepción
1993	(Argentina) Buenos Aires	(Argentina) Estudantil	(Argentina) Olimpia	(Argentina) Huracán
1994	(Brazil) Sertãozinho	(Argentina) Estudantil	(Argentina) UVT	(Argentina) Concepción
1995	Not Held			
1996	(Argentina) Buenos Aires	(Argentina) Estudantil	(Argentina) Concepción	(Argentina) Andes Talleres SC
1997	(Chile) Talcahuano	(Argentina) UVT	(Argentina) Casa Italia	(Argentina) Estudantil
1998	(Brazil)	(Argentina) UVT	(Argentina) Olimpia	(Argentina) Unión Social San Juan
1999	(Brazil) Sertãozinho	(Argentina) Concepción	(Brazil) Sertãozinho	(Brazil) Português do Recife
2000	(Chile) Santiago	(Argentina) Estudantil	(Brazil) Português do Recife	(Argentina) Bancaria
2001	(Argentina) Mendoza	(Argentina) Estudantil	(Argentina) Palmira	(Argentina) Olimpia
2002	Not Held			
2003	Not Held			
2004	(Brazil) Teresópolis	(Argentina) UVT	(Argentina) Concepción	(Brazil) EC Corrêas
2005	(Argentina) Mendoza	(Argentina) Olimpia	(Argentina) Estudantil	(Argentina) Andes Talleres SC
2006		(Argentina) Concepción		
2007	(Argentina) Malargue	(Argentina) Concepción	(Argentina) Centro Valenciano	(Argentina) Estudantil
2008	(Brazil) Recife	(Argentina) Club Petroleros YPF	(Argentina) Concepción	(Argentina) Andes Talleres SC
2009	(Argentina) San Juan	(Argentina) Estudantil	(Argentina) Concepción	(Argentina) Club Petroleros YPF
2010	(Chile) Santiago	(Argentina) Olimpia	(Chile) Universidad Católica	Universidad de Chile
2011	(Brazil) Sertãozinho	(Argentina) Huracán	(Argentina) Olimpia	(Brazil) Sport Recife
2012	(Argentina) Buenos Aires	(Brazil) Sport Recife	(Argentina) San Lorenzo	(Argentina) Huracán
2013	(Chile) Santiago	Canceled		
2014	(Argentina) Buenos Aires	(Argentina) Club Ciudad Buenos Aires	(Argentina) Huracán	(Brazil) Mogiana HC
2015	(Argentina) Buenos Aires	(Argentina) Huracán	(Argentina) Unión de Santa Fe	(Argentina) Centro Valenciano
2016	(Argentina) Mendoza	(Argentina) Andes Talleres	(Argentina) Estudantil Porteño	(Argentina) Concepción
2017	(Brazil) Recife	(Argentina) Concepción	(Argentina) Centro Valenciano	(Brazil) Sport Recife
2018	(Brazil) Santos	(Argentina) Club Leonardo Murialdo	(Argentina) Concepción	(Argentina) Andes Talleres
2019	(Argentina) San Juan	(Argentina) Club Leonardo Murialdo	(Argentina) Centro Valenciano	(Argentina) Casa Italia
2021	(Argentina) San Juan	(Argentina) UVT	(Argentina) Rivadavia	
2024	(Colombia) Ibagué	(Chile) HC San Jorge	(Argentina) Andes Talleres	(Argentina) Huracán
2025	(Argentina) San Juan	(Argentina) Andes Talleres	(Argentina) Atlético Unión	(Argentina) Lomas de Rivadavia

=== Wins by team ===
Team	Wins
(Argentina) Estudantil	8
(Argentina) Concepción	7
(Argentina) UVT	7
(Brazil) Sertãozinho	3
(Argentina) Olimpia	2
(Argentina) Huracán	2
(Argentina) Club Leonardo Murialdo	2
(Argentina) Andes Talleres	2
(Argentina) Club Petroleros YPF	1
(Brazil) Sport Recife	1
(Argentina) Club Ciudad Buenos Aires	1
(Chile) HC San Jorge	1

=== Wins by country ===
Country	Wins
Argentina	32
Brazil	4
Chile	1
