= Palmeiras-Barra Funda Intermodal Terminal =

Transportation hub in São Paulo, Brazil

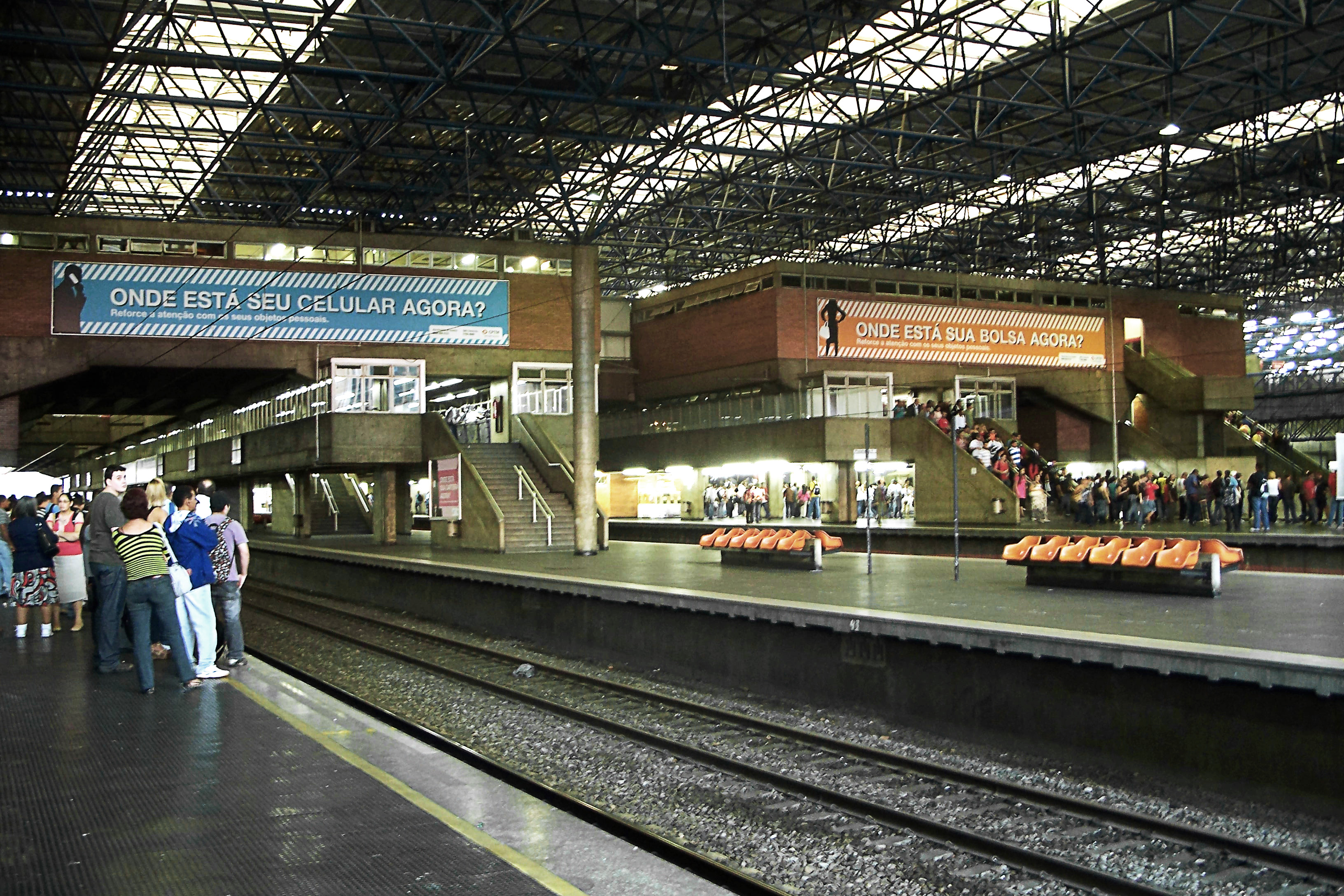
- Palmeiras-Barra Funda Intermodal Terminal

General information
- Location: Rua Mário de Andrade, 664, Barra Funda - São Paulo, SP
- Coordinates: 23°31′32″S 46°40′02″W
- System: Intermodal: rapid transit, commuter rail, bus
- Owner: Socicam; Companhia do Metropolitano de São Paulo; Companhia Paulista de Trens Metropolitanos; TIC Trens; ViaMobilidade
- Lines: Multiple bus lines; Multiple road lines

Construction
- Accessible: y

Other information
- Station code: BFU

History
- Opened: 18 December 1988

Services
Preceding station	São Paulo Metro	Following station
Terminus	Line 3	Marechal Deodoro towards Corinthians-Itaquera
Preceding station	São Paulo Metropolitan Trains	Following station
Água Branca towards Jundiaí	Line 7	Luz towards Palmeiras-Barra Funda
Água Branca towards Jundiaí	Service 710 (closed 27 August 2025)	Luz towards Rio Grande da Serra
Lapa towards Amador Bueno	Line 8	Júlio Prestes Terminus
Terminus	Line 10	Luz towards Rio Grande da Serra
Terminus	Line 11	Luz towards Estudantes
Terminus	Line 13-Airport Express	Luz towards Aeroporto–Guarulhos
Location

Palmeiras-Barra Funda Intermodal Terminal is the second largest intermodal transportation hub in São Paulo, Brazil. The terminal has access to the São Paulo Metro, CPTM commuter rail, and numerous bus lines.

== Bus terminal ==
=== Locations served ===
Domestic destinations

- São Paulo (state)

Regions
- São José do Rio Preto
- Araçatuba
- Presidente Prudente
- Bauru
- Marília
- Assis
- Itapetininga
- Sorocaba
- Piedade
- Registro
- Itapecerica da Serra

- Rondônia
- Acre
- Mato Grosso
- Mato Grosso do Sul
- Paraná (Except Curitiba)

International destinations

- Bolívia

* The remaining locations are served by the Tietê and Jabaquara bus terminals.

=== Companies and destinations ===
The following companies operate in the terminal. Its main destinations are shown in parentheses.

==== Domestic destinations ====
São Paulo

Greater São Paulo

Selective

- Airport Service (São Paulo-Guarulhos International Airport)
- Anhanguera (Osasco, Barueri, Santana de Parnaíba, Itapevi, Jandira, Carapicuíba, Pirapora do Bom Jesus)
- Intervias (Cotia)
- Anhanguera (Caieiras, Franco da Rocha, Francisco Morato)
Interior
- Andorinha (Presidente Prudente, Presidente Venceslau, Rosana, Assis, Palmital)
- Cometa (Sorocaba, Votorantim, São Miguel Arcanjo, Itapetininga, São Roque, Salto de Pirapora, São José do Rio Preto, Catanduva, Tatuí)
- Danúbio Azul (Cotia, Ibiúna, Vargem Grande Paulista, Piedade)
- Expresso de Prata (Bauru, Marília, Araçatuba, Adamantina, Lençóis Paulista, Penápolis, Panorama, Tupã)
- Expresso Regional (São Roque, Cotia, Itapevi, Mairinque, Araçariguama, Vargem Grande Paulista)
- Intersul (Registro, Juquitiba, Miracatu, Cajati)
- Itamarati (Mirassol, Jales, Votuporanga, Monte Aprazível, Fernandópolis)
- Manoel Rodrigues (Avaré, Ourinhos, Itaí, Piraju, Manduri, Paranapanema)
- Osastur (Avaré, Itatinga)
- Princesa do Norte (Itaí)
- Rápido Fênix (Botucatu, São Manuel, Conchas, Laranjal Paulista)
- Reunidas Paulista (Bauru, Marília, Jaú, Birigüi, Adamantina, Araçatuba, Dracena, Lins, Ilha Solteira, Tupã, Valparaíso)
- Santa Cruz (Botucatu, Jaú, Bariri, São Manuel, Barra Bonita)
- São Raphael (Catiguá, Riolândia, Tabapuã, Nova Granada, Icém, Palestina)
- Transpen (Ribeira, Iporanga, Capão Bonito, Itararé, Itapeva, Guapiara)
- Vale do Tietê (Tietê, Salto, Botucatu, Itu, Cabreúva, Cerquilho, Laranjal Paulista, Itupeva)
Coast
- Intersul (Itanhaém, Iguape, Peruíbe, Ilha Comprida, Cananéia)

Paraná

- Brasil Sul (Toledo, Assis Chateaubriand, Nova Aurora, Goioerê, Campo Mourão)
- Expresso Kaiowa (Londrina, Maringá, Cascavel, Ponta Grossa, Campo Mourão)
- Garcia (Londrina, Maringá, Paranavaí, Terra Roxa, Cianorte, Bandeirantes, Arapongas, Cornélio Procópio)
- Jóia (Pinhalão, Siqueira Campos, Jaboti, Figueira)
- Ouro Branco (Londrina, Paranavaí, Porecatu, Bandeirantes, Cornélio Procópio, Santa Margarida, Sertanópolis)
- Viação Pluma Internacional (Foz do Iguaçu, Cascavel, Toledo, Laranjeiras do Sul, Marechal Cândido Rondon)
- Princesa do Ivaí (Arapongas, Rolândia, Mamboré, Campo Mourão, Ubiratã)
- Princesa do Norte (Pinhalão, Jacarezinho, Jaboti, Wenceslau Braz, Joaquim Távora)
- Princesa dos Campos (Pato Branco, Campanema, Ponta Grossa, Prudentópolis, São João, Planalto)
- Transfada (Ponta Grossa, Castro, Piraí do Sul, Sengés, Jaguariaíva)

Mato Grosso

- Empresa de Transportes Andorinha (Cuiabá, Rondonópolis, Pontes e Lacerda)
- EUCATUR (Cuiabá, Rondonópolis, Pontes e Lacerda, Jaciara, Comodoro)
- Gontijo (Cuiabá, Rondonópolis, Pontes e Lacerda, Alto Araguaia, Jaciara, Comodoro)
- Itamarati (Araputanga)
- Motta (Cuiabá, Rondonópolis)
- Nacional Expresso (Pontes e Lacerda)
- Nova Integração (Sinop, Sorriso, Várzea Grande, Alta Floresta, Nobres)
- Rotas do Triângulo (Cuiabá, Pontes e Lacerda, Alto Araguaia, Várzea Grande)

Mato Grosso do Sul

- Andorinha (Campo Grande)
- Crucena (Porto Soares)
- Viação Motta (Campo Grande, Ponta Porã, Dourados, Bela Vista, Vincentina)
- Reunidas Paulista (Três Lagoas)
- Itamarati (Paranaíba, Aparecida do Taboado)

Rondônia

- Andorinha (Porto Velho, Ji Paraná)
- Eucatur (Porto Velho, Ariquemes, Jaru, Ouro Preto do Oeste, Jí-Paraná, Presidente Médici, Cacoal, Pimenta Bueno, Vilhena)
- Gontijo (Porto Velho, Ji Paraná, Vilhena)
- Rotas do Triângulo (Porto Velho, Ji Paraná, Vilhena, Cacoal, Pimenta Bueno, Ouro Preto do Oeste)

Acre

- Rotas do Triângulo (Rio Branco)

Goiás

- Eucatur (Santa Rita do Araguaia)
- Gontijo (Santa Rita do Araguaia)
- Rotas do Triângulo (Jataí, Itumbiara)

Minas Gerais

- Eucatur (Uberlândia, Uberaba)
- Rotas do Triângulo (Frutal)

==== International destinations ====
Bolívia

- Andorinha (Puerto Suárez)
- La Cruceña (Puerto Suárez)
- (La Preferida Bus) (Santa Cruz de la Sierra)
