= Microregion of Sorocaba =

Coordinates: 23°30′07″S 47°27′28″W

- Microregion
- Location of Microregion of Sorocaba in the state of São Paulo
- Country: Brazil
- Region: Southeast
- State: São Paulo
- Mesoregion: Macro Metropolitan Paulista

Area
  - Total: 4,202 km^{2} (1,622 sq mi)
- Time zone: UTC-3 (UTC-3)
  - Summer (DST): UTC-2 (UTC-2)

The Microregion of Sorocaba (Portuguese: Microrregião de Sorocaba) is a microregion in the central part of São Paulo State, Brazil.

== Municipalities ==
The microregion consists of the following municipalities:

- Alumínio
- Araçariguama
- Araçoiaba da Serra
- Cabreúva
- Capela do Alto
- Iperó
- Itu
- Mairinque
- Porto Feliz
- Salto
- Salto de Pirapora
- São Roque
- Sarapuí
- Sorocaba
- Votorantim

== Economy ==
Many people travel to São Paulo to work during the week, particularly from the larger of the municipalities. Those who work in São Paulo and thereby earn higher wages than obtainable locally can usually afford larger houses due to the lower cost of living outside of São Paulo. In the smaller towns such as Votorantim there is a lot of agricultural employment.
