= Pilar do Sul =

- Municipality
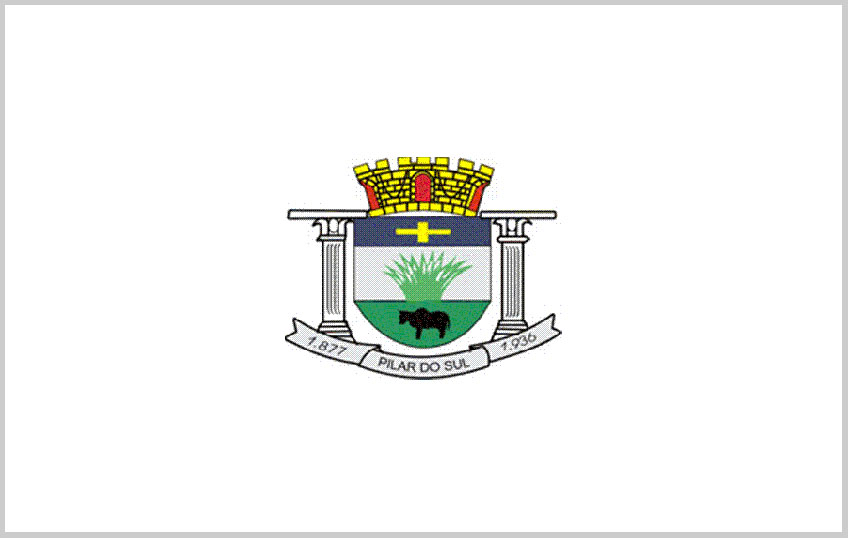
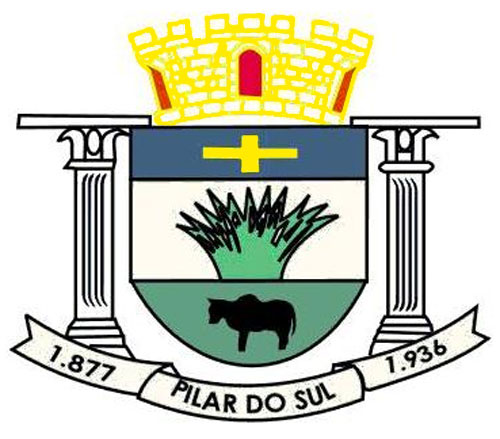
- Flag Coat of arms
- Nickname: Nascente das Águas (Spring of Waters)
- Location in São Paulo state

- Location in Brazil
- Coordinates: 23°48′46″S 47°42′57″W
- Country: Brazil
- Region: Southeast Brazil
- State: São Paulo
- Metropolitan Region: Sorocaba

Government
  - Prefect: Janete Pedrina de Carvalho Paes (PSDB)

Area
  - Total: 681.12 km^{2} (262.98 sq mi)
- Elevation: 689 m (2,260 ft)

Population (2020)
  - Total: 29,402
  - Density: 43.167/km^{2} (111.80/sq mi)
- Time zone: UTC−3 (BRT)
- Postal code: 18185
- Website: www.pilardosul.sp.gov.br

Pilar do Sul is a municipality in the state of São Paulo in Brazil. It is part of the Metropolitan Region of Sorocaba. The population is 29,402 (2020 est.) in an area of 681.12 km^{2} (262.98 sq mi). The elevation is 689 m.

== History ==
The history of Pilar do Sul city began in 1850, when drovers, hunters and miners passed through the region to search precious metals. The place name may derive from the fact that many families from the state of Minas Gerais came to the locality to acquire stones that they used to make pestles to tenderize meat. In Portuguese the word "Pilar" means “to pestle.” The local stone was also used for tanning leather of hunted animals. Another possible source of the city’s name may stem from the religiosity of those Minas Gerais’ families, who had great devotion to Our Lady of Pilar, a Spanish Saint.

In 1865, Lieutenant Almeida acquired an allotment in the region and brought slaves to build a farm, and after that he built a small chapel in honor of Bom Jesus do Bomfim, to which he was devoted. In 1868, the lieutenant gave the land to the Diocese of Sorocaba. In 1877, João Batista Ribeiro, with permission of the bishop at the time, founded the town of Pilar, raising the town to the category of parish by a providential law. On May 12, 1891, through a decree, the town became a municipality, and on 20th of the same month stewardship of the town was established, with Eusebio de Moraes Cunha named as the first mayor of Pilar.

The city was slow to develop during the twentieth century. The poor roads and the sluggish growth of agriculture caused stagnation and the loss of political autonomy, with the town becoming a district of Piedade city in 1934. On November 5, 1936, Pilar regained its autonomy as a town. In March of the following year, Eugenio Theodoro Sobrinho took office as first elected mayor. In the same year, the House of Councilors passed a law that gave away lands within the town to all who wanted to build buildings of any kind. In 1944, the city officially changed its name to “Pilar do Sul."

Recently, Pilar do Sul has grown every year, giving greater emphasis to agricultural development, which is responsible for 70% of the municipal economy. Tourism, largely attributable to the beauty of local natural springs known as the "Spring of Waters," has also begun to develop, providing a boost to the city’s economy.

== Geography ==
=== Borders ===
- North Sarapuí and Salto de Pirapora;
- South Tapiraí;
- East Piedade;
- West São Miguel Arcanjo and Itapetininga.

== Media ==
In telecommunications, the city was served by Companhia de Telecomunicações do Estado de São Paulo until 1975, when it began to be served by Telecomunicações de São Paulo. In July 1998, this company was acquired by Telefónica, which adopted the Vivo brand in 2012.

The company is currently an operator of cell phones, fixed lines, internet (fiber optics/4G) and television (satellite and cable).

== See also ==
- List of municipalities in São Paulo
- Interior of São Paulo
