= Poupatempo =

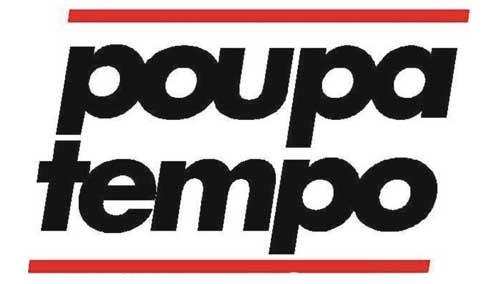
- Founded: 1996, São Paulo, Brazil

Poupatempo is a project created and implemented by the São Paulo State government, during the administration of Mário Covas, in 1996. The service offers in one place more than 400 services related to official documents, from the emission of ID Cards and Driver's License, to Employment record books, among others. Currently, there are 100 facilities across the state of São Paulo. The program also has online services starting in 2020, currently offering 184 services on the official website or smartphone app.

In 2015, a survey showed 97% of the users of the program approved of the service given in the facilities.

In October 2016, started being distributed self-service totems across the state in places like Shopping Centers, Supermarkets, Metro and Train stations, among others. These totems serve basic functions, like printing basic documents and scheduling services in the program's facilities. Currently, there are 34 such totems across the state.

With the opening of the Junqueirópolis Poupatempo, in December 2021, the program crossed the mark of 100 fixed facilities across the state.

== Facilities ==
Capital

- Alesp
- Cidade Ademar
- Itaquera
- Lapa
- Santo Amaro
- Sé

Greater São Paulo

- Caieiras
- Carapicuíba
- Cotia
- Diadema
- Ferraz de Vasconcelos
- Franco da Rocha
- Guarulhos
- Itaquaquecetuba
- Mauá
- Mogi das Cruzes
- Osasco
- Santo André
- São Bernardo do Campo
- Suzano
- Taboão da Serra

Coastal

- Caraguatatuba
- Guarujá
- Praia Grande
- Santos
- São Vicente
- Ubatuba

Inner State

- Aguaí
- Americana
- Andradina
- Araçatuba
- Araraquara
- Araras
- Assis
- Atibaia
- Avaré
- Barretos
- Bauru
- Bebedouro
- Birigui
- Boituva
- Botucatu
- Bragança Paulista
- Caçapava
- Campinas Shopping
- Capão Bonito
- Catanduva
- Cerquilho
- Dracena
- Fernandópolis
- Franca
- Guaratinguetá
- Hortolândia
- Ibaté
- Ibitinga
- Indaiatuba
- Itapetininga
- Itapeva
- Itatiba
- Itatinga
- Itu
- Jacareí
- Jahu
- Jales
- Jundiaí
- Junqueirópolis
- Lençóis Paulista
- Limeira
- Lins
- Lorena
- Marília
- Matão
- Mococa
- Mogi Guaçu
- Neves Paulista
- Ourinhos
- Penápolis
- Pindamonhangaba
- Piquete
- Piracicaba
- Porto Ferreira
- Presidente Prudente
- Registro
- Ribeirão Preto
- Rio Claro
- Salto
- Santa Bárbara d'Oeste
- São Carlos
- São João da Boa Vista
- São José do Rio Preto
- São José dos Campos
- Serra Negra
- Sertãozinho
- Sorocaba
- Sumaré
- Tatuí
- Taubaté
- Tupã
- Votuporanga

Note: Informations recovered from the official website.

== Scheduling ==
In light of the growing demand for services, the administration of the program instituted a scheduling system. To receive the following services, the user has to first mark a date in advance. The scheduling in Poupatempo has to be done for the following services:

- Employee Records
- Services related with a Driver's License
- Emission of an Employment record book
- Emission of a Criminal Background Record.
- Emission of an ID Card
- Entrance into Unemployment benefits
- Services related to vehicles
