= São Roque, São Paulo =

São Roque
- Municipality
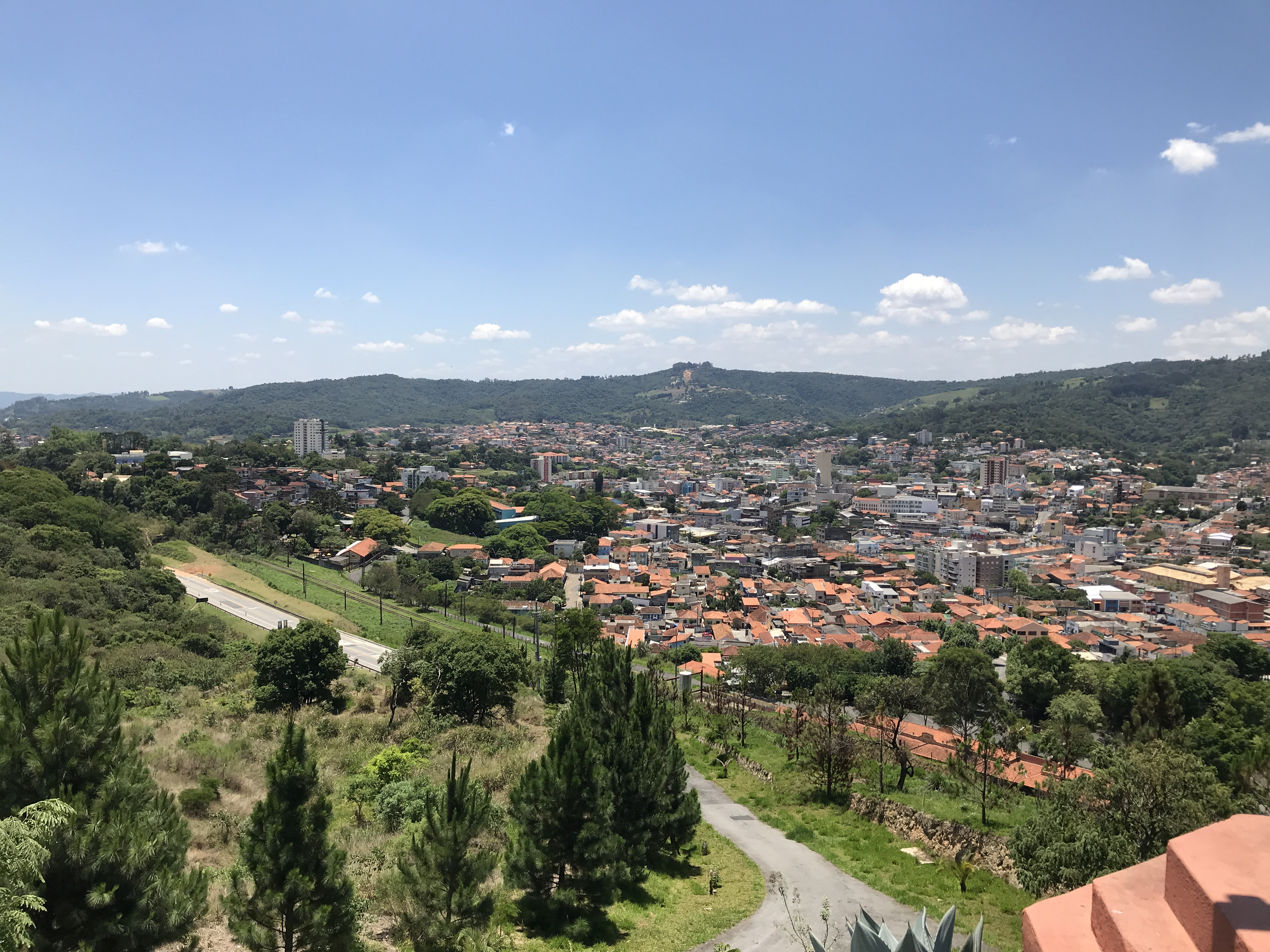

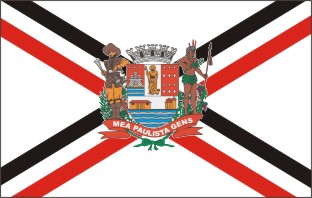
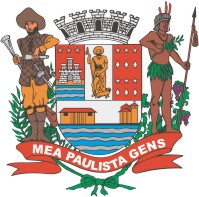
- Flag Coat of arms

- Location in São Paulo state

- Location in Brazil
- Coordinates: 23°31′45″S 47°08′07″W
- Country: Brazil
- Region: Southeast
- State: São Paulo
- Metrop. region: Sorocaba

Government
  - Mayor: Marcos Augusto Issa Henriques de Araújo (PODE, 2021–2024)

Area
  - Total: 306.91 km^{2} (118.50 sq mi)
- Elevation: 771 m (2,530 ft)

Population (2020)
  - Total: 92,060
  - Density: 300.0/km^{2} (776.9/sq mi)
- Time zone: UTC– 03:00 (BRT)
  - Summer (DST): UTC– 02:00 (BRST)
- Postal code: 18130-000
- Area code: +55 11
- Website: www.saoroque.sp.gov.br

São Roque (meaning Saint Roch in Portuguese) is a city in the state of São Paulo in Brazil. It is part of the Metropolitan Region of Sorocaba. The population is 92,060 (2020 est.) in an area of 306.91 km^{2} (118.50 sq mi). The city is at an altitude of 771 m. São Roque is connected by two main highways: Rodovia Raposo Tavares and Rodovia Castelo Branco. It is located 60 km west from the state capital. Some of the neighboring municipalities are Cotia, Vargem Grande Paulista, Ibiúna, Mairinque and Aluminio.

São Roque has protected greenspaces and maintains itself as a lush ecological paradise. It has a good climate with a wonderful countryside. The Serra do Mar mountains cover the southeast. It has an excellent infrastructure, especially well-developed for wine production. In the 19th century, immigrants from Italy and Portugal arrived in São Roque to work in vineyards. Tourism is also a significant part of the economy. It holds the largest artificial ski park in Latin America, the Ski Mountain Park.

== Demography ==
Historical population (municipality)
Year	Population	%±
1920	17,294
1940	21,806	26.1%
1950	27,217	24.8%
1960	29,100	6.9%
1970	37,049	27.3%
1980	49,548	33.7%
1991	63,900	29.0%
2000	66,637	4.3%
2010	78,821	18.3%
2022	79,484	0.8%

== Media ==
In telecommunications, the city was served by Companhia Telefônica Brasileira until 1973, when it began to be served by Telecomunicações de São Paulo. In July 1998, this company was acquired by Telefónica, which adopted the Vivo brand in 2012.

The company is currently an operator of cell phones, fixed lines, internet (fiber optics/4G) and television (satellite and cable).

== Transportation ==
The city is served by São Paulo Catarina Executive Airport.

The city also has several taxi stands located in the central area and at the bus station.

Intercity transportation is operated by two companies: Rápido Luxo Campinas (to Sorocaba, Mairinque, Alumínio, Ibiúna and Araçariguama, by EMTU) and Viação Danúbio Azul (to Itapevi, Pirapora do Bom Jesus, Vargem Grande Paulista, Cotia and Araçariguama, all including the latter by ARTESP, as it is a partial trip line -VP- between São Roque and Pirapora do Bom Jesus). All lines operate from a suburban terminal located next to the bus station. Viação Cometa operates bus lines (to São Paulo, Sorocaba, Itapetininga, Santos, São Vicente, Praia Grande and Mongaguá).

The city is connected to the state capital by two highways, Raposo Tavares SP-270 and Castelo Branco SP-280. The former also connects São Roque to Sorocaba, the most important regional economic center in the region. There is a railroad connecting São Roque to São Paulo and Sorocaba: it is the Trunk Line of the former Sorocabana Railroad. However, the railroad is currently deactivated in the region, since passenger transportation was discontinued in 1999, after the privatization of the company that owned the railroad, the state-owned company FEPASA.

== Notable people ==
- Juca de Oliveira, actor

== Religion ==
Christianity is present in the city as follows:

=== Catholic Church ===
The Catholic church in the municipality is part of the Diocese of Osasco.

=== Protestant Church ===
The most diverse evangelical beliefs are present in the city, mainly Pentecostal, including the Assemblies of God in Brazil (the largest evangelical church in the country), Christian Congregation in Brazil, among others. These denominations are growing more and more throughout Brazil.

== See also ==
- List of municipalities in São Paulo
- Interior of São Paulo
