= Arcanjo =

Arcanjo may refer to:

- Estádio José Arcanjo, a multi-use stadium in Olhão, Portugal
- São Miguel Arcanjo, São Paulo, a municipality in the state of São Paulo, Brazil
- Junio César Arcanjo (1983-), a Brazilian football attacking midfielder
- São Miguel Arcanjo (disambiguation)
- São Miguel Arcanjo (São Miguel)
