= Sorocaba metropolitan area =

The Metropolitan Region of Sorocaba (Portuguese: Região Metropolitana de Sorocaba) is an administrative division of the state of São Paulo in Brazil. It was created in 2014, and consists of the following municipalities:

- Alambari
- Alumínio
- Araçariguama
- Araçoiaba da Serra
- Boituva
- Capela do Alto
- Cerquilho
- Cesário Lange
- Ibiúna
- Iperó
- Itapetininga
- Itu
- Jumirim
- Mairinque
- Piedade
- Pilar do Sul
- Porto Feliz
- Salto
- Salto de Pirapora
- São Miguel Arcanjo
- São Roque
- Sarapuí
- Sorocaba
- Tapiraí
- Tatuí
- Tietê
- Votorantim
