= Cantate =

Cantate is a Latin word, meaning "sing!". It has become part of words in other languages, such as the French Cantate and the German Kantate, both meaning cantata. Cantata may refer to:

- Cantate Domino, or Psalm 98
- Cantate Sunday, a Sunday of the church year for which the reading begins with the word
- Cantate!, a Catholic hymnal in German
- Cantate de Noël, a Christmas cantata
- Cantate FM, a radio station of the Vatican
- Cantate (typeface)
