= Zecão (footballer) =

Brazilian footballer (1949–2020)

Personal information
- Full name: José Carlos Picini
- Date of birth: 15 May 1949
- Place of birth: Sorocaba, Brazil
- Date of death: 16 April 2020 (aged 70)
- Place of death: Sarapuí, Brazil
- Position: Goalkeeper

Youth career
- São Bento

Senior career*
Years	Team	Apps	(Gls)
1970–1973	São Bento		
1973–1976	Portuguesa	123	(0)
1976–1977	America-RJ		
1977–1979	Marília		
1979–1980	Operário-MS		
1981	Marília		

Managerial career
- 1988: Portuguesa
- * Club domestic league appearances and goals

José Carlos Picini (15 May 1949 – 16 April 2020), better known as Zecão, was a Brazilian professional footballer and manager who played as a goalkeeper.

== Career ==
Revealed by EC São Bento youth categories, Zecão began his career with the club. In 1973 he arrived at Portuguesa de Desportos, where he made history by being the goalkeeper of the shared title with Santos FC of the 1973 Campeonato Paulista. He also had spells for America-RJ, Marília and Operário-MS.

As a coach, Zecão had a brief spell at Portuguesa in 1988, where he led the club for 5 matches.

== Personal life and death ==
Zecão was a cousin of sports narrator Nilson César (Rádio Jovem Pan).

Zecão died of pancreatic cancer on his ranch in Sarapuí, near Sorocaba, on 16 April 2020 at the age of 70.

== Honours ==
Portuguesa

- Campeonato Paulista: 1973
- Taça Cidade de São Paulo: 1973
