= Vitória Gabrielly case =

2018 murder of a girl in São Paulo, Brazil

Vitória Gabrielly Case
- Location: Araçariguama, São Paulo, Brazil
- Date: June 8, 2018
- Attack type: Intentional homicide
- Weapon: Traumatic mechanical asphyxia by strangulation
- Deaths: 1
- Victim: Vitória Gabrielly Guimarães Vaz
- Accused: Bruno Oliveira, Mayara Abrantes, Julio Cesar Lima Ergesse

The Vitória Gabrielly Case refers to the murder of Vitória Gabrielly Guimarães Vaz, who disappeared in 2018, when she was 12 years old, after leaving home to go rollerblading in Araçariguama, São Paulo, Brazil.

The body was found in a thicket eight days later. Vitória Gabrielly was killed by traumatic mechanical asphyxiation by strangulation. The girl had 'defense injuries and restraint marks'; report speaks of 'cruel death'. Vitória was mistakenly killed in drug debt collection.

== Victim and murder ==
Vitória Gabrielly Guimarães Vaz was a 12-year-old girl who lived in Araçariguama, in the interior of São Paulo. On June 8, 2018, the girl left the house to go rollerblading when she disappeared. A camera caught the girl rollerblading. The girl's body was found 8 days after her disappearance. Victoria was killed by traumatic mechanical asphyxiation from strangulation. The girl had 'defense injuries and restraint marks'; report speaks of 'cruel death'.

== Sentenced letter to victim's father ==
The involved Júlio César Lima Ergesse, sentenced to 34 years in prison for the death of Vitória Gabrielly, sent a letter to Luís Alberto Vaz (the victim's father) contesting the course that the case took, claiming that he was condemned for what the other two defendants did, the girl's father handed the letter to delegate Bruna Racca Madureira (responsible for investigating the death), the defense lawyer Glauber Bez, said that he would not make any statement in this letter because the facts contained in it do not make sense, in addition to another statement by Bruna that says that the inquiry was closed and all the facts established at the time, the girl's father said that he felt "used" by the coldness of the letter and that Ergesse made no mention of his daughter's death to him and that he only wrote what was of interest to him.

== Tributes ==
On March 8, 2022 (International Women's Day), the Araçariguama police station created a room that bears the name of Vitória as a space intended for the care and reception of women, children and elderly victims of domestic violence. In addition, two teams from Araçariguama played a game using a banner with Vitória's face drawn and the words: "The princess of the pink skates", also in Araçariguama, in the last place that the girl was seen, were three paintings were fixed in memory of the girl, by artist Jack Ray Domingues (born in London and resident in São Roque).
