= Alumínio =

Municipality in the state of São Paulo in Brazil

- Municipality
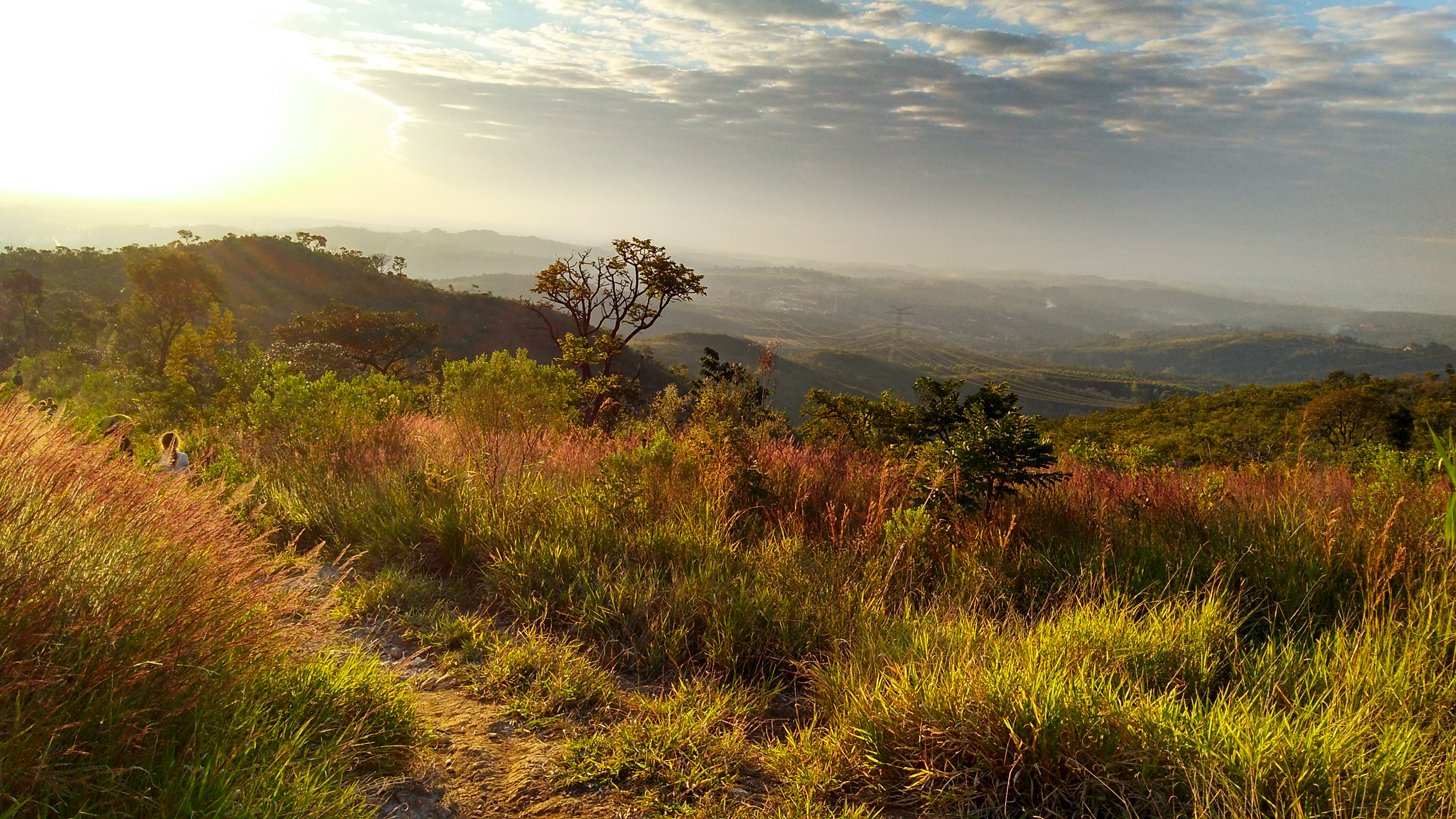

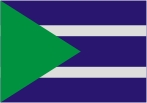
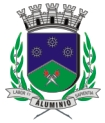
- Flag Coat of arms

- Location in São Paulo state

- Location in Brazil
- Coordinates: 23°32′7″S 47°15′44″W
- Country: Brazil
- Region: Southeast
- State: São Paulo
- Metrop. region: Sorocaba

Area
  - Total: 83.66 km^{2} (32.30 sq mi)
- Elevation: 790 m (2,590 ft)

Population (2020)
  - Total: 18,767
  - Density: 224.3/km^{2} (581.0/sq mi)
- Time zone: UTC−3 (BRT)
- Postal code: 18125
- Area code: +55 11
- Website: aluminio.sp.gov.br

Alumínio (Portuguese meaning aluminium) is a Brazilian municipality of the state of São Paulo. It is part of the Metropolitan Region of Sorocaba. The population is 18,767 (2020 est.) in an area of 83.66 km^{2}. The elevation is 790 m. Alumínio is located east of Sorocaba and is also a suburban area. The main employer in Alumínio is Companhia Brasileira de Aluminio.

== History ==
The history of the city starts with the Rodovalho Railway, named after Col. Antônio Proost Rodovalho, owner of a factory in Alumínio. His factory existed until 1920. Alumínio was part of São Roque city until Mairinque was emancipated as an independent city and yet, Alumínio was just a borough of Mairinque. In 1991, Alumínio was emancipated and became a city.

== Demography ==
Historical population (municipality)
Year	Population	%±
2000	15,252	—
2010	16,839	10.4%
2022	17,301	2.7%

Obs: According to the 2000 IBGE Census, the population was 15,252, of which 13,727 are urban and 1,525 are rural. The average life expectancy was 69.03 years. The literacy rate was at 92.89%.

== Geography ==
=== Neighbouring places ===
- Mairinque
- Sorocaba
- Votorantim
- Ibiúna

== Media ==
In telecommunications, the city was served by Telecomunicações de São Paulo. In July 1998, this company was acquired by Telefónica, which adopted the Vivo brand in 2012.

== The Lake Tancão ==
- O Tancão is a lake located in the rural area of the municipality of Alumínio, in the interior of São Paulo state, in the Alto Itararé and Baixo Itararé neighborhoods. It is part of the Médio Tietê basin and is a water source for the Itupararanga reservoir. The lake's official name is Lago Maurel Miller, also called Tanque Municipal Maurel Miller. This name was given by the Alumínio City Hall in May 2023, in honor of Maurel Miller, a well-known figure in the Alumínio and Mairinque communities, linked to the region's religious traditions. He received the title of Citizen of Alumínio during his lifetime, given to people who, even though not born in the municipality, greatly helped the local community. The river that forms Tancão was also known as Rio Toca da Onça, as some people say it originates in a region popularly called Toca da Onça. Before becoming a lake, the area was a shallow stream called Córrego do Tancão. The area was excavated, reaching depths of over 10 meters in some places, and then flooded. Tancão is one of several lakes and reservoirs in the region created to supply water to old settlements that worked on farms, such as Fazenda Gir, and also for fishing. It is one of the best known in the region and one of the few with its own name. When the water filled the area, the pine trees that were there drowned. For a long time, only one tree remained, with half its trunk underwater, which also ended up dying. Tancão receives water from a larger and deeper reservoir located on the other side of the street. The lake's water is used by Sabesp to supply the city. The soil in the region is clayey. Near Tancão there is a second, smaller and shallower tank, through which the river water flows. This tank and the river often receive untreated domestic sewage, dumped irregularly, which has already caused complaints from residents. The lake is also used for sport fishing. Every year a fishing championship takes place at the site, which has plenty of fish.
- The Tancão (large pond) requires caution, as there have been cases of drowning there. One of the cases recounted by the community, whose name is not known for sure due to the passage of time, is of a person who ate, went swimming in the middle of the lake, became ill, and ended up drowning without being able to return. There is also an unconfirmed story that a car went down the street without brakes and fell into the lake, killing the driver; according to the account, during dry periods it would be possible to see the car's wreckage.

https://commons.wikimedia.org/wiki/File:P%C3%A1gina_1.jpg

https://commons.wikimedia.org/wiki/File:P%C3%A1gina_2.jpg

https://commons.wikimedia.org/wiki/File:P%C3%A1gina_3.jpg

https://commons.wikimedia.org/wiki/File:P%C3%A1gina_4.jpg

https://commons.wikimedia.org/wiki/File:P%C3%A1gina_5.jpg

https://commons.wikimedia.org/wiki/File:P%C3%A1gina_6.jpg

https://commons.wikimedia.org/wiki/File:P%C3%A1gina_7.jpg

https://commons.wikimedia.org/wiki/File:P%C3%A1gina_8.jpg

https://commons.wikimedia.org/wiki/File:P%C3%A1gina_9.jpg

https://commons.wikimedia.org/wiki/File:P%C3%A1gina_10.jpg

https://commons.wikimedia.org/wiki/File:P%C3%A1gina_11.jpg

https://commons.wikimedia.org/wiki/File:P%C3%A1gina_12.jpg

The company is currently an operator of cell phones, fixed lines, internet (fiber optics/4G) and television (satellite and cable).

== Religion ==
Christianity is present in the city as follows:

=== Catholic Church ===
The Catholic church in the municipality is part of the Diocese of Osasco.

=== Protestant Church ===
The most diverse evangelical beliefs are present in the city, mainly Pentecostal, including the Assemblies of God in Brazil (the largest evangelical church in the country), Christian Congregation in Brazil, among others. These denominations are growing more and more throughout Brazil.

== See also ==
- List of municipalities in São Paulo
- Interior of São Paulo
