= Mega Filmes HD =

Streaming of films and series site

Mega Filmes
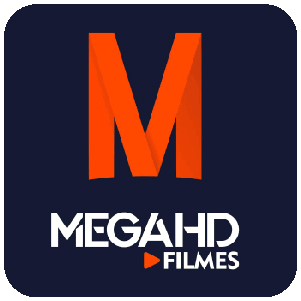
- Available in: Portuguese
- Country of origin: Brazil
- Area served: Worldwide
- Founders: Thalita Cardoso; Marcos Cardoso
- President: Thalita Cardoso and Marcos Cardoso
- Industry: Entertainment
- Revenue: BRL 70 thousand per month
- Registration: No
- Launched: 2011
- Current status: Extinct in 2015

Mega Filmes HD was a Brazilian portal that distributed films, documentaries, television series, miniseries, telenovelas, shows, anime, and cartoons without paying royalties or taxes. The site was on the air for five years and came to offer about 160 thousand files of international and national products. Mega Filmes HD was considered one of the biggest pirate sites in Latin America.

== Operation Blackbeard ==
On the morning of November 18, 2015, the Federal Police Department of Sorocaba (SP) launched Operation Barba Negra, which dismantled suspects who were broadcasting programs even before the official premieres. A couple was hastily arrested and another five people were taken to Federal Police units to be heard and later released. 14 court orders were executed – issued by the 1st Federal Court of Sorocaba – in the cities of Cerquilho (SP), Campinas (SP), and Ipatinga (MG). The bank accounts of the seven suspected of managing the site were blocked by the Court at the request of the Federal Police. Those investigated were indicted for committing crimes of constituting a criminal organization, with a penalty of three to eight years and a fine, in addition to copyright infringement with a penalty of two to four years and a fine.

A police estimate points out that the site received 60 million visits per month in the first half of 2015, of which 85% were from Brazilians and 15% from countries such as Portugal and Japan. On Facebook, the site had over 4.5 million followers. The income came from charging for advertising displayed on the site.

=== Mega Films Couple ===
The couple's lawyer who ran the site said they admitted they had the service and that they did not know the case was so serious. The website owner said he had the same business in Japan, where he lived for about nine years, and brought the service to Brazil. "My client arrived from Japan and there this practice is common. He did not imagine that he would be arrested", said the lawyer.

The couple was released a few days later, responding in freedom since November 28, 2015.

=== Repercussion ===
The announcement of the end of Mega Filmes HD took many netizens by surprise. On Twitter, the name of the site remained throughout the day among the most talked about topics on the social network. Some internet users even created a Facebook campaign to change their profile pictures in favor of the site. There was no shortage of people complaining about the site going offline or making memes and jokes about it.

A petition has also been created on behalf of Mega Filmes HD administrators through Avaaz.org.
