= Itapetininga =

- Municipality
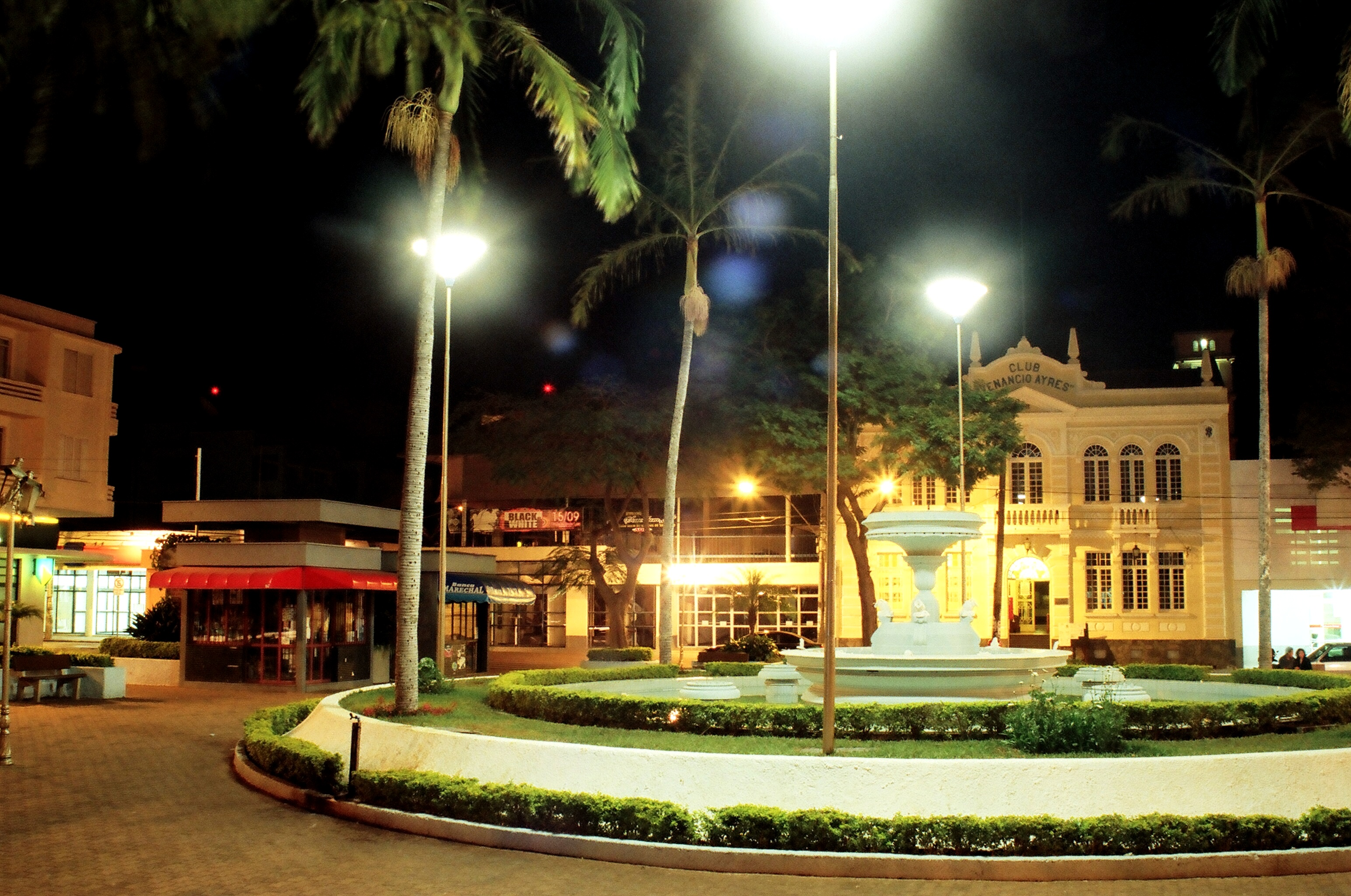
- Largo dos Amores square at night

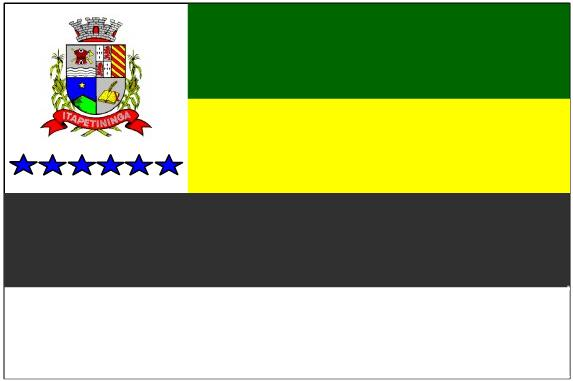
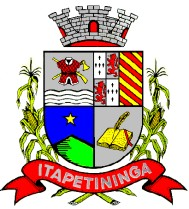
- Flag Coat of arms

- Location in São Paulo state

- Location in Brazil
- Coordinates: 23°35′30″S 48°3′11″W
- Country: Brazil
- Region: Southeast
- State: São Paulo

Government
  - Mayor: Jeferson Brun

Area
  - Total: 1,790 km^{2} (690 sq mi)

Population (2022 Census)
  - Total: 157,790
  - Estimate (2025): 164,256
  - Density: 88.2/km^{2} (228/sq mi)
- Time zone: UTC-03:00 (BRT)
  - Summer (DST): UTC-02:00 (BRST)
- Area code: 15

Itapetininga is a municipality in the state of São Paulo, Brazil. The population is 157,790 (2022 Census) in an area of 1790 km^{2}. The name comes from a Tupi-Guarani language, meaning "dry stone".

The city is the seat of the Government Region of Itapetininga, made up of twelve other municipalities: Alambari, Angatuba, Boituva, Campina do Monte Alegre, Capela do Alto, Cerquilho, Cesário Lange, Guareí, Quadra, São Miguel Arcanjo, Sarapuí and Tatuí, which together have more than 520 thousand inhabitants.

It is situated in the southern part of the state, and is known as cidade das escolas, meaning city of schools in Portuguese.

== History ==
Itapetininga developed along with the "tropeirismo" (Trooping), as a resting point of the cattle dealers, who were mounting groups and villages for the landing, before they travel towards the South. The first nucleus of cattle dealers in the region of Itapetininga appeared in 1724, when it was discovered that the pasture in the region was abundant and the land was fertile for planting. To these factors there was added up the distance to the Sorocaba town - 12 leagues - that was corresponding to a journey of a troop. About 1760, a group of Portuguese, led by Domingos José Vieira, left the first nucleus (today, district of Porto) and formed another, in a high place and surrounded by two streams.

At this time there was an argument between two nucleuses that wanted to be elevated to the condition of town. The results: on April 17, 1770, Simão Barbosa Franco was nominated to establish and administering the new village, and so was left to him the choice of the principal nucleus. Historians tell that a "marching" mule, offered as a present to Simão Barbosa Franco, guaranteed the victory to Domingos José Vieira. The town of Nossa Senhora dos Prazeres de Itapetininga was officially created on November 5, 1770, when a solemn mass was celebrated by the vicar of the new parish, Priest Inácio of Araújo Ferreira. It is in this date that was agreed to commemorate the anniversary of the municipality.

Besides Simão Barbosa Franco and Domingos José Vieira, an Itu town citizen. Salvador de Oliveira Leme (-nicknamed Sarutayá )- has been included among the historical founders of the municipality, since he was the second captain-mor of Itapetininga (the first one was Domingos José Vieira). The emancipation of the Town of Itapetininga happened in 1852, through the Law nº 11, on July 7, 1852. The law granted judicial autonomy, thus creating to judicature of Itapetininga. The town, however, only became a municipality, in fact, on March 13, 1855 with the name of Itapetininga.

The holy patron of Itapetininga is Our Lady of the Pleasures.

== Media ==
In telecommunications, the city was served by Companhia Telefônica Brasileira until 1973, when it began to be served by Telecomunicações de São Paulo. In July 1998, this company was acquired by Telefónica, which adopted the Vivo brand in 2012.

The company is currently an operator of cell phones, fixed lines, internet (fiber optics/4G) and television (satellite and cable).

== Geography ==
=== Climate ===
Climate data for Itapetininga, elevation 639 m (2,096 ft), (1995–2010 normals, extremes 1994–2011)
Month	Jan	Feb	Mar	Apr	May	Jun	Jul	Aug	Sep	Oct	Nov	Dec	Year
Record high °C (°F)	39.4 (102.9)	35.2 (95.4)	36.5 (97.7)	34.4 (93.9)	30.2 (86.4)	29.5 (85.1)	34.0 (93.2)	34.2 (93.6)	36.4 (97.5)	36.0 (96.8)	39.7 (103.5)	36.1 (97.0)	39.7 (103.5)
Mean daily maximum °C (°F)	28.9 (84.0)	29.0 (84.2)	28.4 (83.1)	26.4 (79.5)	22.8 (73.0)	21.9 (71.4)	22.1 (71.8)	23.6 (74.5)	24.3 (75.7)	26.1 (79.0)	27.3 (81.1)	29.0 (84.2)	25.8 (78.5)
Daily mean °C (°F)	24.4 (75.9)	24.6 (76.3)	24.1 (75.4)	22.0 (71.6)	18.4 (65.1)	17.3 (63.1)	17.1 (62.8)	18.5 (65.3)	19.5 (67.1)	21.3 (70.3)	22.4 (72.3)	24.0 (75.2)	21.1 (70.0)
Mean daily minimum °C (°F)	20.0 (68.0)	20.1 (68.2)	19.7 (67.5)	17.5 (63.5)	14.1 (57.4)	12.7 (54.9)	12.2 (54.0)	13.3 (55.9)	14.7 (58.5)	16.5 (61.7)	17.6 (63.7)	18.9 (66.0)	16.4 (61.6)
Record low °C (°F)	13.1 (55.6)	12.5 (54.5)	13.0 (55.4)	10.0 (50.0)	6.8 (44.2)	5.2 (41.4)	1.7 (35.1)	0.6 (33.1)	5.4 (41.7)	8.1 (46.6)	9.8 (49.6)	10.3 (50.5)	0.6 (33.1)
Average precipitation mm (inches)	264.3 (10.41)	148.9 (5.86)	141.8 (5.58)	72.1 (2.84)	62.0 (2.44)	48.4 (1.91)	62.8 (2.47)	34.1 (1.34)	88.5 (3.48)	111.3 (4.38)	121.2 (4.77)	199.2 (7.84)	1,354.6 (53.32)
Average precipitation days (≥ 1.0 mm)	14.6	11.1	7.9	5.8	5.8	4.0	4.1	3.6	7.2	8.0	8.6	12.3	93
Source: Centro Integrado de Informações Agrometeorológicas

== See also ==
- List of municipalities in São Paulo
- Interior of São Paulo
