= Wallace (footballer, born 1986) =

Brazilian footballer

Personal information
- Full name: Wallace Fernando Pereira
- Date of birth: 29 October 1986 (age 40)
- Place of birth: Cerquilho, Brazil
- Height: 1.83 m (6 ft 0 in)
- Position: Left back

Team information
- Current team: Ittihad Kalba FC

Senior career*
| Years | Team | Apps | (Gls) |
| 2004–2005 | São Carlos | 10 | (1) |
| 2005–2008 | Sheriff Tiraspol | 80 | (7) |
| 2008–2010 | Fredrikstad | 54 | (9) |
| 2010–2013 | Gent | 42 | (1) |
| 2014 | Hoverla | 5 | (0) |
| 2014–2017 | Xanthi | 61 | (0) |
| 2017–2018 | AEL | 22 | (0) |
| 2019 | Pelotas | 0 | (0) |
| 2020 | XV de Piracicaba | 0 | (0) |
- * Club domestic league appearances and goals as of 17:30, 10 March 2018 (UTC)

Wallace Fernando Pereira (born 29 October 1986 in Cerquilho) is a Brazilian professional footballer who plays as a left back.

== Career ==
=== Fredrikstad ===
After three seasons played at FC Sheriff Tiraspol, Wallace signed for Fredrikstad on 19 February 2008. He quickly adapted to his new surroundings, and his trademark free kick goals made him a crowd favourite.

=== Gent ===
On 31 August 2010, Wallace signed a 3-year deal with Belgian club Gent. On 1 December 2010, he netted the only goal in a 1:0 win against Levski Sofia in a UEFA Europa League game and helped preserve his team's chances of progression to the next stage of the competition.

=== Hoverla ===
On 5 March 2014, Wallace signed with Ukrainian Premier League side Hoverla.

=== Xanthi ===
Ον 29 July 2014, Wallace joined Super League club Xanthi on a three-year contract. On 31 May 2017, Xanthi officially announced that his contract wouldn't be renewed.

=== AEL ===
On 31 May 2017, Wallace stayed in the Super League, after signing with AEL a two-year contract on a free transfer.
