= São Miguel Arcanjo =

São Miguel Arcanjo (Portuguese for "Saint Michael Archangel") may refer to the following places:

- São Miguel Arcanjo (São Miguel), Santiago, Cape Verde
- São Miguel Arcanjo, São Paulo, Brazil
