= Jumirim =

- Municipality
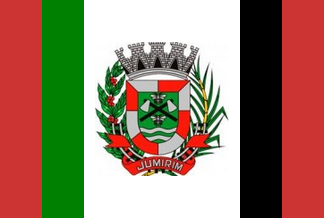
- Flag

- Location in São Paulo state

- Location in Brazil
- Coordinates: 23°5′12″S 47°47′3″W
- Country: Brazil
- Region: Southeast Brazil
- State: São Paulo
- Metropolitan Region: Sorocaba

Area
  - Total: 56.69 km^{2} (21.89 sq mi)
- Elevation: 561 m (1,841 ft)

Population (2020)
  - Total: 3,418
  - Density: 60.29/km^{2} (156.2/sq mi)
- Time zone: UTC−3 (BRT)

Jumirim is a municipality in the state of São Paulo in Brazil. It is part of the Metropolitan Region of Sorocaba. The population is 3,418 (2020 est.) in an area of 56.69 km^{2} (21.89 sq mi). The elevation is 561 m.

== Media ==
In telecommunications, the city was served by Telecomunicações de São Paulo. In July 1998, this company was acquired by Telefónica, which adopted the Vivo brand in 2012. The company is currently an operator of cell phones, fixed lines, internet (fiber optics/4G) and television (satellite and cable).

== See also ==
- List of municipalities in São Paulo
- Interior of São Paulo
