= Tietê =

Tietê may refer to:

- Tietê, São Paulo, a city in the state of São Paulo, Brazil
- Tietê River, a river in the state of São Paulo, Brazil
- Tietê Bus Terminal (Portuguese: Terminal Rodoviário Tietê), a bus station in the city of São Paulo, SP, Brazil
