= Jabaquara Intermunicipal Terminal =

Bus terminal in São Paulo, Brazil

Jabaquara Intermunicipal Terminal Terminal Intermunicipal Jabaquara
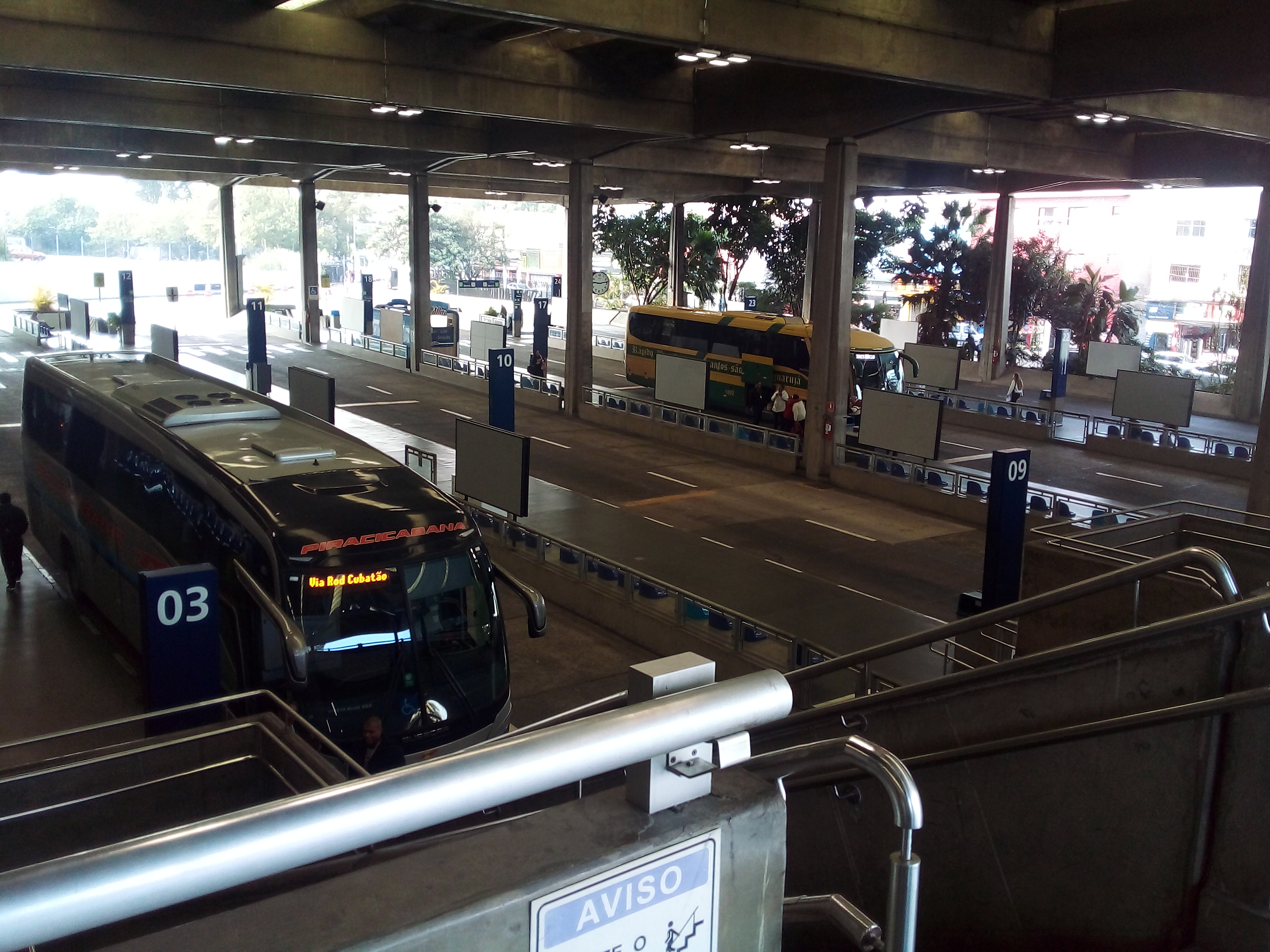
- Jabaquara Road Terminal

General information
- Location: Rua dos Jequitibás; São Paulo; Brazil
- Coordinates: 23°38′46″S 46°38′32″W
- Owner: State Government of São Paulo
- Lines: 10 (Road); 14 (Metropolitan)
- Bus routes: SPTrans: 605A–10, 675G–10, 675M–10, 675R–10, 695X–10, 4721–10, N603–11, N604–11, N633–11, N637–11; ARTESP: 867; ARTESP: 288, 289, 290
- Bus operators: Socicam (Road); ARTESP (Metropolitan)
- Connections: São Paulo Metro: at Jabaquara

Construction
- Platform levels: 3 (Road); 1 (Metropolitan)

History
- Opened: 2 May 1977 (Road); September 1990 (Metropolitan)
Location

Jabaquara Intermunicipal Terminal is an intermunicipal bus terminal in São Paulo, Brazil. Along with the Tietê Bus Terminal and the Palmeiras-Barra Funda Intermodal Terminal, it is one of the most important bus terminals in the State of São Paulo. tel.11 5060-4275 of ambulatory.
