= Piedade, São Paulo =

Piedade
- Municipality
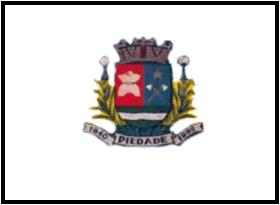
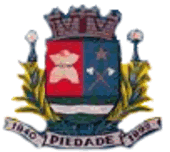
- Flag Coat of arms

- Location in São Paulo state

- Location in Brazil
- Coordinates: 23°42′43″S 47°25′40″W
- Country: Brazil
- Region: Southeast Brazil
- State: São Paulo
- Metropolitan Region: Sorocaba

Area
  - Total: 746.87 km^{2} (288.37 sq mi)
- Elevation: 781 m (2,562 ft)

Population (2020)
  - Total: 55,542
  - Density: 74.366/km^{2} (192.61/sq mi)
- Time zone: UTC−3 (BRT)

Piedade is a municipality in the state of São Paulo in Brazil. It is part of the Metropolitan Region of Sorocaba. The population is 55,542 (2020 est.) in an area of 746.87 km^{2} (288.37 sq mi). The elevation is 781 m (2,562 ft).

The municipality contains part of the 26,250 hectares (64,900 acres) Jurupará State Park, created in 1992.

== Media ==
In telecommunications, the city was served by Companhia Telefônica Brasileira until 1973, when it began to be served by Telecomunicações de São Paulo. In July 1998, this company was acquired by Telefónica, which adopted the Vivo brand in 2012.

The company is currently an operator of cell phones, fixed lines, internet (fiber optics/4G) and television (satellite and cable).

== Neighboring municipalities ==
- Ibiúna
- Pilar do Sul
- Salto de Pirapora
- Tapiraí
- Votorantim

== See also ==
- List of municipalities in São Paulo
- Interior of São Paulo
