= Ski Mountain Park =

Permanently closed artificial ski park in São Roque, Brazil

Coordinates: 23.506210°S 47.11837°W

The Ski Mountain Park was an artificial ski resort located in São Roque, a municipality in the state of São Paulo, Brazil. It got inaugurated in 1998 and currently sits at an altitude of 1,200 meters while being surrounded by the Atlantic Forest. It was considered the largest artificial mountain entertainment center in Latin America.

It was a family-oriented adventure park containing a mix of winter-themed sports, eco-tourism and leisure activities.

== Rides ==
The main rides were:

- Skiing and Snowboarding: The main ride in the ski park. It had artificial tracks made of special polyethylene blocks which simulate snow via a water and soap lubrication system, as well as a ski school for beginners.
- Toboggans (skibunda): Long, fast concrete tracks where visitors slide down a mountain with a specialized sled.
- Chairlift (teleférico): An aerial ride that connected the lower area to the top of the mountain, with aerial views of São Roque.

The park also had rope courses (arvorismo), archery, paintball and horseback riding.

== Toboggan incident and permanent closing ==
In April 8, 2023, a teacher who frequently visited the park (Luciana Cerri) was riding down the toboggan with her 7-year-old son, when the specialized sled started losing control, launching both into the air. They violently landed in a metal protective barrier, causing the teacher to die and her son to get head injuries.

Subsequent investigations by the Civil Police indicated that renovations carried out on the slide ramp months earlier had taken place without a technical design or oversight by experts. Furthermore, the surface was damp at the time of the accident due to a light drizzle that happened earlier, which drastically reduced friction and caused users to lift off the slide on a curve. In early 2024, the park’s administrator and manager were indicted for involuntary manslaughter and causing bodily injury through negligence.
