= Jurupará State Park =

State park in São Paulo, Brazil

- Parque Estadual do Jurupará
- IUCN category II (national park)
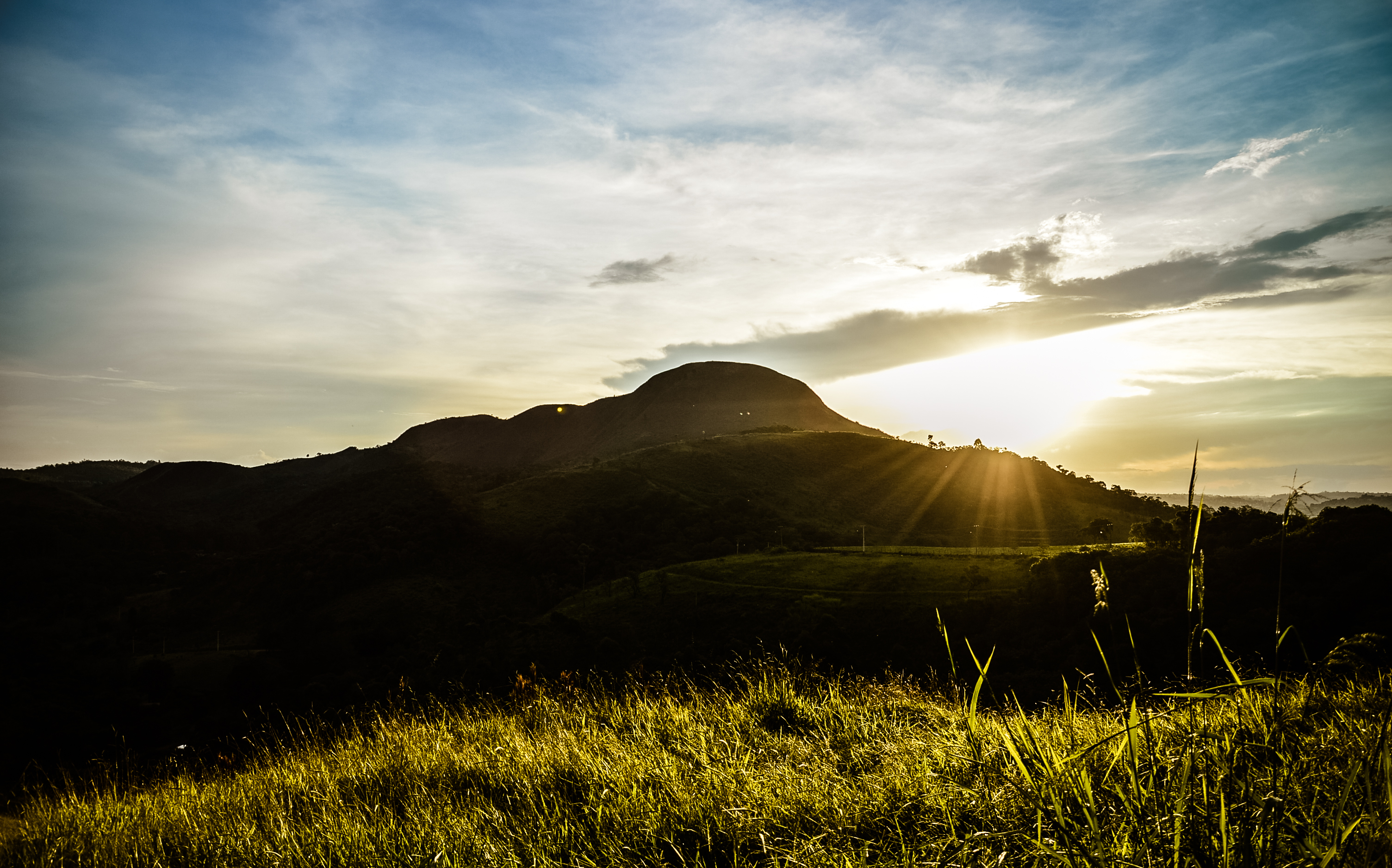
- Morro do Sabó

- Location within Brazil
- Nearest city: Ibiúna, São Paulo
- Coordinates: 23°50′35″S 47°12′44″W
- Area: 26,250.47 ha (101.3536 sq mi)
- Designation: State park
- Created: 22 September 1992
- Administrator: Fundação Florestal SP

The Jurupará State Park (Portuguese: Parque Estadual do Jurupará) is a state park in the state of São Paulo, Brazil. It protects an area of Atlantic Forest, and provides a bridge between other conservation units in the region.

== Location ==
The Jurupará State Park is in the municipalities of Ibiúna and Piedade, São Paulo. The park has an area of 26,250.47 hectares (64,866.3 acres) within a perimeter of 114.24 kilometres (70.99 mi). Of this 24,799.22 hectares (61,280.2 acres) are in Ibiúna and 1,450.51 hectares (3,584.3 acres) are in Piedade.

The park is an important water catchment area in the basin of the Ribeira de Iguape, a tributary of the Juquiá River. The park helps protect the watershed of the upper Juquiá, containing streams that feed the Juquiá, Juquiá-Guaçu and Peixe rivers. There are four hydroelectric power plants within the perimeter of the park.

The park is part of one of the largest corridors of Atlantic Forest in Brazil, and since 1991 has been part of the Atlantic Forest Biosphere Reserve. The park is located between the Paranapiacaba Ecological Continuum, the Serra do Mar State Park, the Itupararanga Environmental Protection Area and the Morro Grande State Reserve, and serves to connect these areas. It is thus part of an extensive corridor that protect the Atlantic Forest of the state of SP, although some of the forest remnants are in a secondary stage of conservation.

== History ==
The Jurupará State Park was created to protect and conserve its water resources, and to preserve the fragment of Atlantic Forest that it contains Ekos Brasil and the state's Forest Foundation worked together on developing the management plan. The consultative council was created on 29 July 2009. The management plan was published on 8 July 2010.

== Environment ==
During preparation of the management plan 68 species of endangered fauna and flora were found, and 182 endemic species. Threats include predatory hunting and fishing, and extraction of non-timber products, notably heart of palm. Some parts of the park have resident people, which may be a threat to biodiversity.

The vegetation is in the Atlantic Forest biome. It includes dense montane rainforest (primary and secondary), dense submontane rainforest (primary and secondary), dense high montane rainforest, rocky outcrop vegetation, anthropic fields and eucalyptus plantations. During preparation of the management plan 557 species of flora were identified, in 103 families and 303 genera. Of these, 31 species were classified as endangered, 41 endemic and 38 exotic. There is an estimated total of 587 species of vertebrates in the park, of which 94 are mammals, 258 birds, 161 amphibians or reptiles, and 74 fish. Of the total number of species recorded, 46 are threatened with extinction, 141 are considered endemic and 19 are exotic.

As of 2010 there was some surveillance of the park by employees, subcontractors and environmental police. The resident population is engaged in subsistence activities, with domestic and farmed animals. Hunting, fishing and extraction of non-timber products, particularly palm hearts, are practiced by inhabitants, squatters and visitors.

== Visiting ==
As of 2010 there was no regulated public use, although small numbers of the public were visiting at their own risk without supervision. Attractions at the Juquiá-Bonito operational base include the Juquiá-Bonito River Waterfall, Rio Bonito Waterfall, Paredão Waterfall and their access trails. The Juquiá-Guaçú base has its access trail, and there is the Descalvado Peak and Descalvado Peak Interpretive Trail, and the Estrada Jurupará Park / Estrada Juquiá-Guaçu Park cycling route.

== Sources ==
- Leonel, Cristiane; Passold, Anna Julia; Pasquini, Bruna Bianca (8 July 2010), Parque Estadual do Jurupará Plano de Manejo - Resumo Executivo (PDF) (in Portuguese), São Paulo: Ekos Brasil, Fundação Florestal, archived from the original (PDF) on 2017-02-06
- Plano de Manejo do Parque Estadual do Jurupará (SP) (in Portuguese), Ekos Brasil, archived from the original on 2017-02-05
