= Tietê, São Paulo =

Tietê
- Municipality
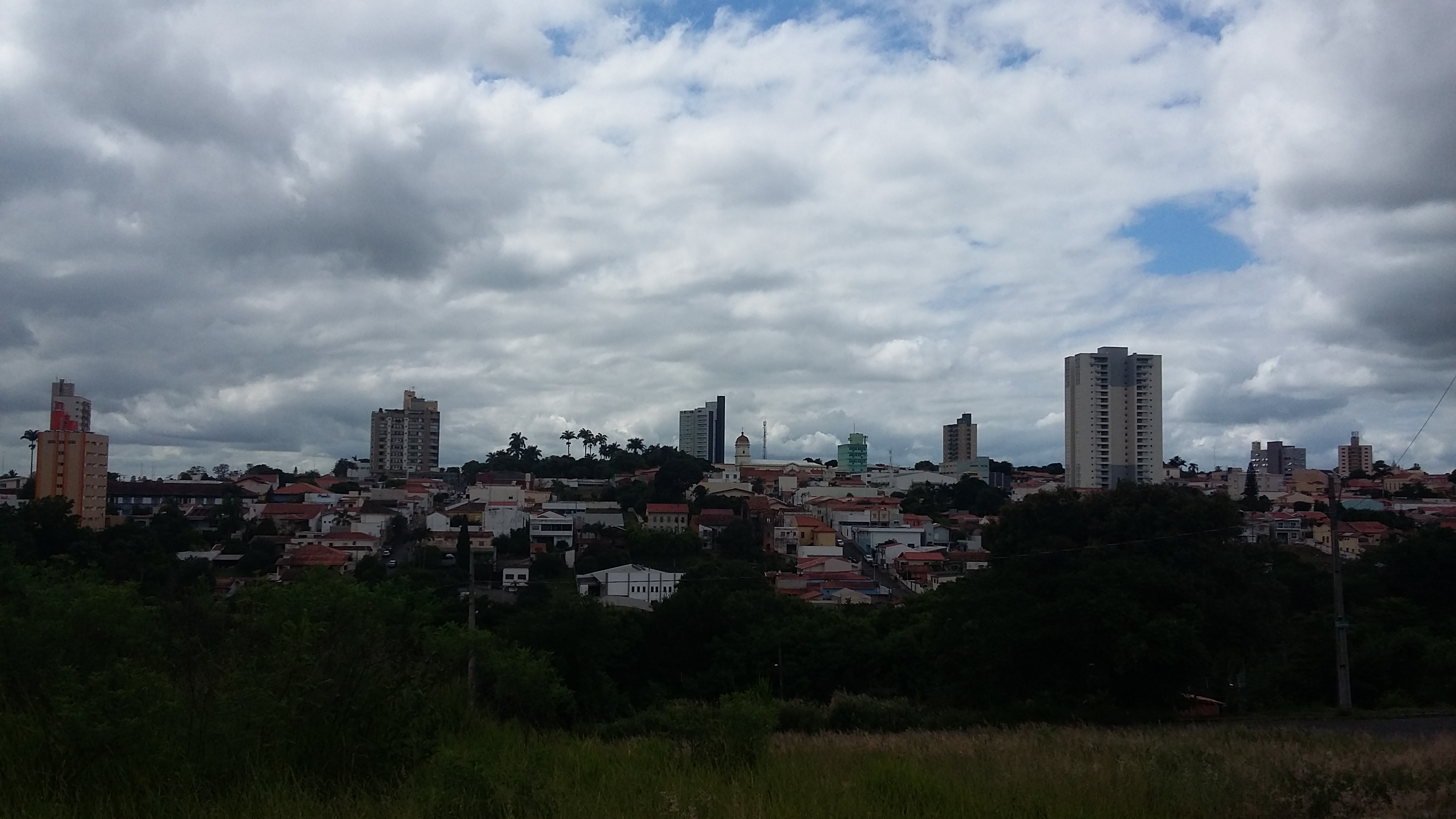

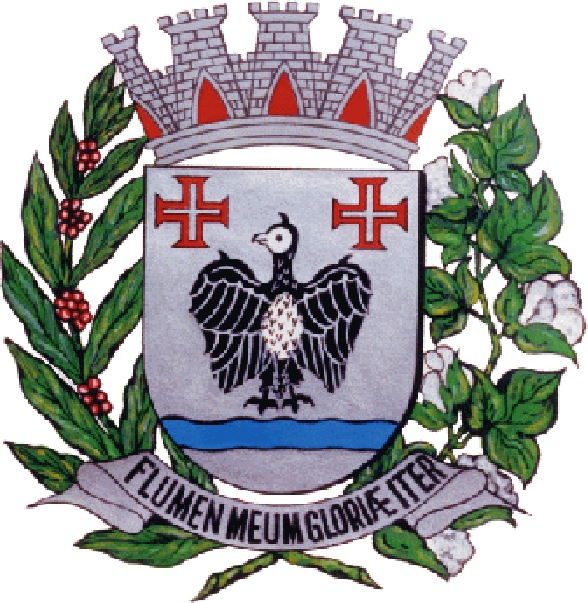
- Flag Coat of arms
- Motto: Flumen Meun Gloriae Iter "My River, Way of Glory"
- Location in São Paulo state

- Location in Brazil
- Coordinates: 23°6′7″S 47°42′53″W
- Country: Brazil
- Region: Southeast Brazil
- State: São Paulo
- Metropolitan Region: Sorocaba

Government
  - Prefect: Vlamir Sandei (PSDB) (2017 – 2020)

Area
  - Total: 404.40 km^{2} (156.14 sq mi)
- Elevation: 508 m (1,667 ft)

Population (2020)
  - Total: 42,517
  - Density: 105.14/km^{2} (272.30/sq mi)
- Time zone: UTC−3 (BRT)
- Postal code: 18530-000
- Phone code: 15

Tietê is a Brazilian municipality in the state of São Paulo, located in the Metropolitan Region of Sorocaba, in the Meso-region of Piracicaba and in the Microregion of Piracicaba. It is located at latitude 23º06'07" south and at a longitude 47º42'53" west, being at an altitude of 508 meters. Its estimated population in 2020 was 42,517 inhabitants. It has an area of 392,509 km^{2}. This corresponds to a population density of 86.6 inhabitants/km^{2}.

It is the hometown of the former President of the Republic, Michel Temer.

== History ==
The history of Tietê had origins with the bandeirantes that explored the interior of São Paulo sailing along the Tietê River.

The fertility of the soil has attracted a large number of adventurers and crop aficionados who came here. Almost at the mouth of Ribeirão do Pito Acceso (Ribeirão da Serra), there was an anchorage of canoes that, forming the monsoons demanded of Cuiabá loaded with gold and precious stones. At the riverbank, residents built the first dwellings, thus forming the village of Pirapora do Curuçá. It was named after a stone located on the left bank of the river, which the Indians called Curuçu-Guaçu (which in Tupi means cross) because there was a carved cross in it.

In 1570, as reported by Father José de Anchieta, a shipwreck occurred between Porto Feliz and Tietê. This report indicates the presence of colonizers from the beginning of the discovery. During the monsoon, at the end of the 18th century, Pirapora do Curuçá was the first and most important port of resupply and rest for the bandeirantes leaving Araritaguaba (Porto Feliz).

In 1747, the vicar Francisco Campos, making a brief survey that can be considered the first census of Tietê, found that in the region that descended the river a distance of four leagues from the matrix existed about one hundred and forty houses.

On August 3, 1811, Pirapora do Curuçá was elevated to the parish status of the Holy Trinity of Pirapora do Curuçá.

On March 8, 1842, the parish became a municipality and the name of the village lasted until 1867, when it was moved to Tietê.

== Media ==
In telecommunications, the city was served by Companhia Telefônica Brasileira until 1973, when it began to be served by Telecomunicações de São Paulo. In July 1998, this company was acquired by Telefónica, which adopted the Vivo brand in 2012.

The company is currently an operator of cell phones, fixed lines, internet (fiber optics/4G) and television (satellite and cable).

== See also ==
- List of municipalities in São Paulo
- Interior of São Paulo
