= Votorantim =

Votorantim Município de Votorantim
- Municipality
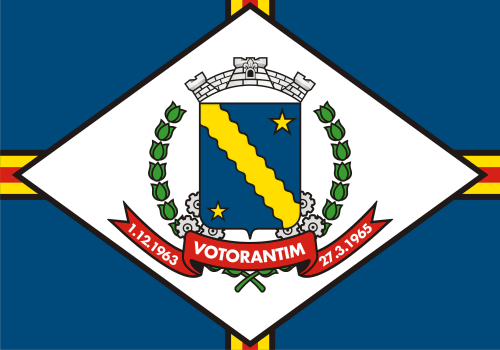
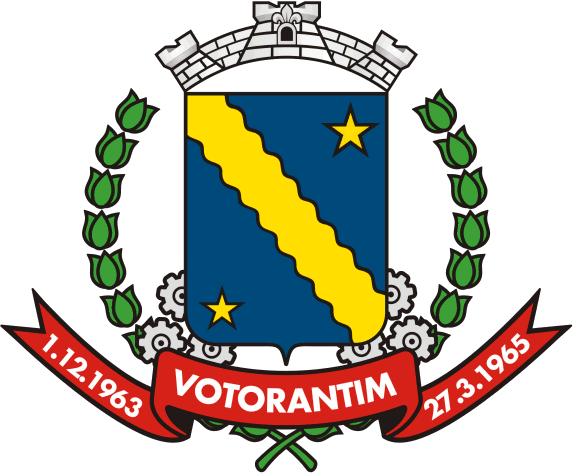
- Flag Coat of arms

- Location of Votorantim in São Paulo

- Location of Votorantim in Brazil
- Coordinates: 23°32′49″S 47°26′16″W
- Region: Southeast
- State: São Paulo
- Metropolitan Region: Sorocaba
- Founded: March 27, 1965

Government
  - Mayor: Fabiola Alves (PSDB, 2021 – 2024)

Area
  - Total: 183.52 km^{2} (70.86 sq mi)
- Elevation: 557 m (1,827 ft)

Population (2022 Census)
  - Total: 127,923
  - Estimate (2025): 133,510
  - Density: 697.05/km^{2} (1,805.4/sq mi)
- Demonym: Votorantinense
- Time zone: UTC−3 (BRT)
- Website: votorantim.sp.gov.br

Votorantim (Portuguese pronunciation: [votoɾɐ̃ˈtʃĩ]) is a city located at the southwest of São Paulo State in Brazil. It is part of the Metropolitan Region of Sorocaba. The population is 127,923 (2022 Census). The city is located about 100 km (62 mi) away from the capital of the state. It has 147 km^{2} (57 mi^{2}) of rural area, 30 km^{2} (12 mi^{2}) of urban area and a total area of 183.52 km^{2} (70.86 mi^{2}).

State Law No. 8,092 of February 28, 1964, separated the district of Votorantim from the municipality of Sorocaba, elevating it to the category of municipality. It is the largest cement producer in Brazil. It also has a privileged geographical location, since it is conurbated with Sorocaba and, therefore, close to its road network, connected to large national and regional centers, such as São Paulo and Campinas.

== Geography ==
It is located in a mountainous region and it has an average altitude of 557 m (1,827 ft). The city has a tropical weather and annual average temperature is 20 degrees. It makes borders with the cities of Sorocaba, Piedade, Ibiúna, Salto de Pirapora and Alumínio. It has important access ways to highways such as Castello Branco (SP-280), Raposo Tavares (SP-270), João Leme dos Santos (SP-264) and SP-79 which binds the city to the south coast of the State.

== Media ==
In telecommunications, the city was served by Telecomunicações de São Paulo. In July 1998, this company was acquired by Telefónica, which adopted the Vivo brand in 2012. The company is currently an operator of cell phones, fixed lines, internet (fiber optics/4G) and television (satellite and cable).

=== Radio station ===
- Cantate FM

== See also ==
- List of municipalities in São Paulo
- Interior of São Paulo
