= Cantate FM =

- Votorantim, São Paulo; Brazil
- Frequency: 104.5 MHz

Programming
- Format: Catholic radio

Ownership
- Owner: Fundação João XXIII

History
- First air date: 2004

Technical information
- Licensing authority: ANATEL
- Class: C
- ERP: 1 kW
- Transmitter coordinates: 23°32′48″S 47°26′16″W

Links
- Public license information: Profile
- Website: www.cantatefm.com.br

Cantate FM is a Catholic radio station in Votorantim, São Paulo. The station broadcasts for the entire region of Sorocaba and online on its official website. It is formed as a part of the Catholic Charismatic Renewal movement, by the Community and Alliance Life Cantate Domino and the granting of the radio Cantate. It was published in the official journal of the Union (Brazil), on July 8, 2004 by the then President of the Federal Senate, Senator José Sarney. It operates at 104.5 FM in Votorantim, Sorocaba and region.
