= Cabreúva =

- Municipality
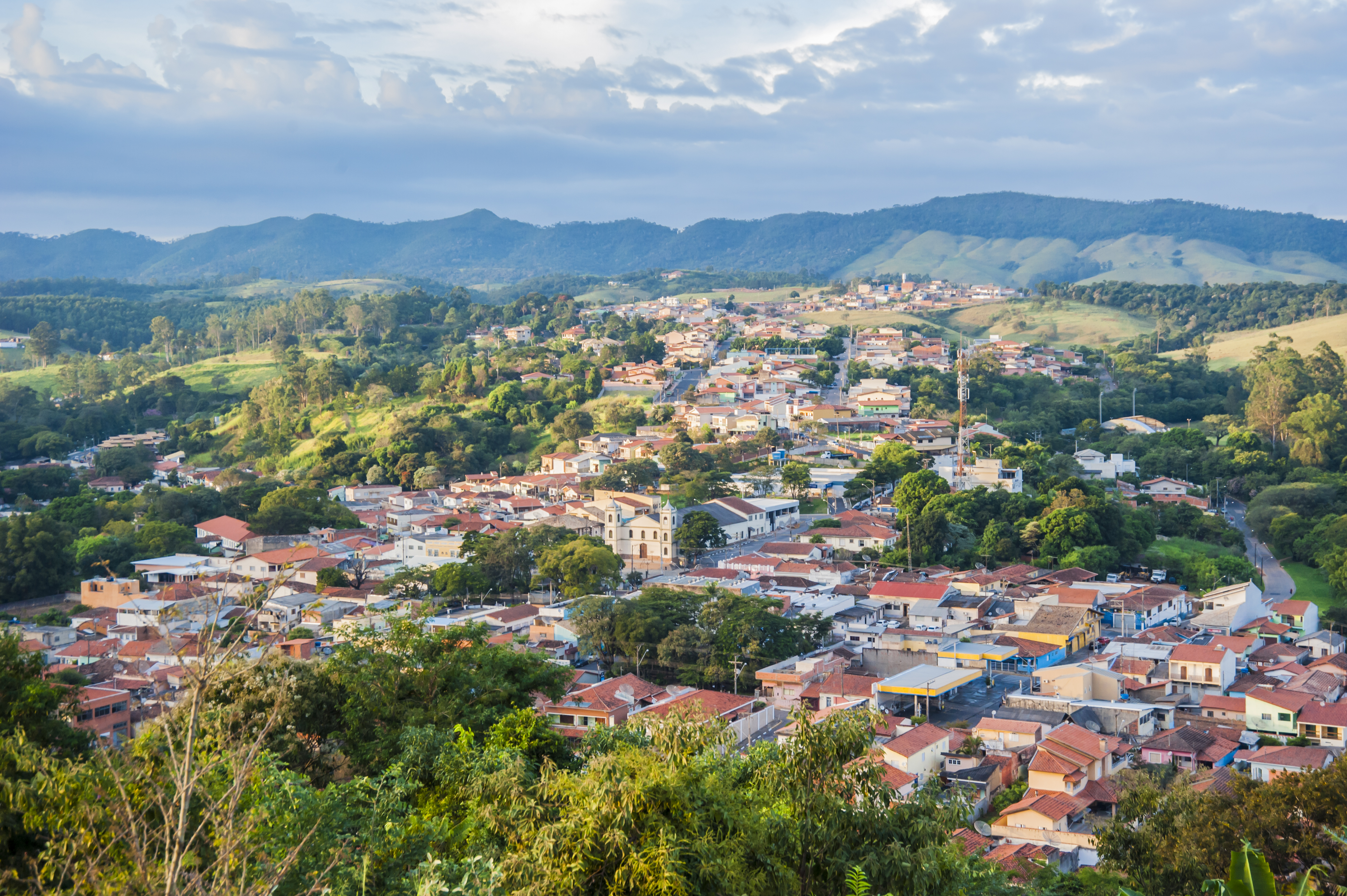

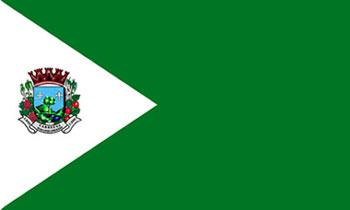
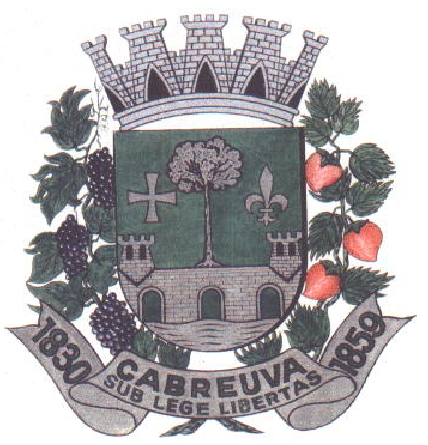
- Flag Coat of arms

- Location in São Paulo state

- Location in Brazil
- Coordinates: 23°18′27″S 47°7′59″W
- Country: Brazil
- Region: Southeast
- State: São Paulo
- Microregion: Sorocaba

Area
  - Total: 260.23 km^{2} (100.48 sq mi)
- Elevation: 640 m (2,100 ft)

Population (2020)
  - Total: 50,429
  - Density: 193.79/km^{2} (501.90/sq mi)
- Time zone: UTC−3 (BRT)
- Postal code: 13315-xxx
- Area code: +55-11
- Website: www.cabreuva.sp.gov.br

Cabreúva is a municipality (município) in the state of São Paulo in Brazil. The population is 50,429 (2020 est.) in an area of 260.23 km^{2}. The elevation is 640 m. The city takes its name from the Cabreúva tree (Myrocarpus frondosus), known as Kaburé-Iwa ("owl tree") in Tupi language.

== History ==
The city was established in the beginning of the 18th century by a member of the Martins e Ramos family, from the city of Itu, who followed the Tietê River to this place in a valley between the three mountains Japi, Guaxatuba and Taguá. Sugar cane was planted in the area for distilled beverage production, which earned the city its nickname Terra da Pinga.

== Geography ==
The landscape is dominated by the mountains (Japi, Guaxatuba and Taguá) and the Tietê river. The altitudes vary between 640 m in the center of the city up to 1,200 m Serra do Japi. The area of the city is 260 km^{2}, of which 96 km^{2} are urban and 165 km^{2} are rural.

== Demographics ==
Historical population (municipality)
Year	Population	%±
1920	5,884
1940	4,970	−15.5%
1950	6,347	27.7%
1960	6,512	2.6%
1970	7,679	17.9%
1980	11,716	52.6%
1991	18,814	60.6%
2000	33,100	75.9%
2010	41,604	25.7%
2022	47,011	13.0%

Obs: According to the 2000 IBGE Census, the population was 33,100, of which 25,760 are urban and 7,340 are rural. The life expectancy was 71.14 years. The literacy rate was 90.05%.

== Media ==
In telecommunications, the city was served by Telecomunicações de São Paulo. In July 1998, this company was acquired by Telefónica, which adopted the Vivo brand in 2012. The company is currently an operator of cell phones, fixed lines, internet (fiber optics/4G) and television (satellite and cable).

== Events ==
- March 24: Day of the municipal anniversary

== See also ==
- List of municipalities in São Paulo
