= Alambari =

- Municipality
- Location in São Paulo state

- Location in Brazil
- Coordinates: 23°33′03″S 47°53′56″W
- Country: Brazil
- Region: Southeast Brazil
- State: São Paulo
- Metropolitan Region: Sorocaba

Area
  - Total: 159.60 km^{2} (61.62 sq mi)
- Elevation: 585 m (1,919 ft)

Population (2020)
  - Total: 6,129
  - Density: 38.40/km^{2} (99.46/sq mi)
- Time zone: UTC−3 (BRT)
- Postal code: 18220

Alambari is a Brazilian municipality located in the state of São Paulo. It is part of the Metropolitan Region of Sorocaba. The population is 6,129 (2020 est.) in an area of 159.60 km^{2}. The municipality was established in 1993.

== Demographics ==
Historical population (municipality)
Year	Population	%±
2000	3,650	—
2010	4,884	33.8%
2022	6,141	25.7%

== Media ==
In telecommunications, the city was served by Telecomunicações de São Paulo. In July 1998, this company was acquired by Telefónica, which adopted the Vivo brand in 2012.

The company is currently an operator of cell phones, fixed lines, internet (fiber optics/4G) and television (satellite and cable).

== See also ==
- List of municipalities in São Paulo
- Interior of São Paulo
