= Araçoiaba da Serra =

Municipality in the state of São Paulo in Brazil

- Municipality
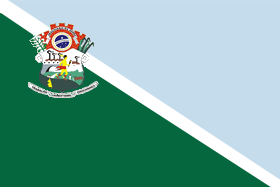
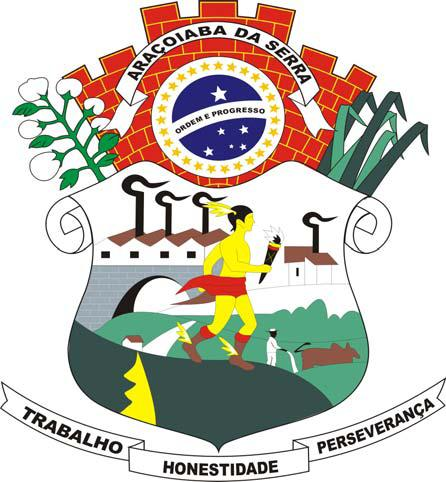
- Flag Coat of arms

- Location in São Paulo state

- Location in Brazil
- Coordinates: 23°30′19″S 47°36′51″W
- Country: Brazil
- Region: Southeast Brazil
- State: São Paulo
- Metropolitan Region: Sorocaba

Area
  - Total: 255.33 km^{2} (98.58 sq mi)
- Elevation: 625 m (2,051 ft)

Population (2020)
  - Total: 34,776
  - Density: 136.20/km^{2} (352.76/sq mi)
- Time zone: UTC−3 (BRT)
- Website: www.aracoiaba.sp.gov.br

Araçoiaba da Serra is a city in the state of São Paulo in Brazil. It is part of the Metropolitan Region of Sorocaba. The population is 34,776 (2020 est.) in an area of 255.33 km^{2} (98.58 sq mi). The elevation is 625 m. The name Araçoiaba comes from the Tupi language, meaning "hider of the sun". This name comes from a single mountain nearby that the natives noted hid the sun as it set in the area.

== Demographics ==
Historical population (municipality)
Year	Population	%±
1920	9,937
1940	10,916	9.9%
1950	10,711	−1.9%
1960	12,220	14.1%
1970	6,557	−46.3%
1980	8,539	30.2%
1991	14,544	70.3%
2000	19,816	36.2%
2010	27,299	37.8%
2022	32,443	18.8%

Obs: According to the 2000 IBGE Census, the population was 19,816, of which 13,679 are urban and 6,137 are rural. The average life expectancy was 71.1 years. The literacy rate was at 92.14%.

== Media ==
In telecommunications, the city was served by Companhia de Telecomunicações do Estado de São Paulo until 1973, when it began to be served by Telecomunicações de São Paulo. In July 1998, this company was acquired by Telefónica, which adopted the Vivo brand in 2012.

The company is currently an operator of cell phones, fixed lines, internet (fiber optics/4G) and television (satellite and cable).

== See also ==
- List of municipalities in São Paulo
- Interior of São Paulo
