= Porto Feliz =

- Municipality
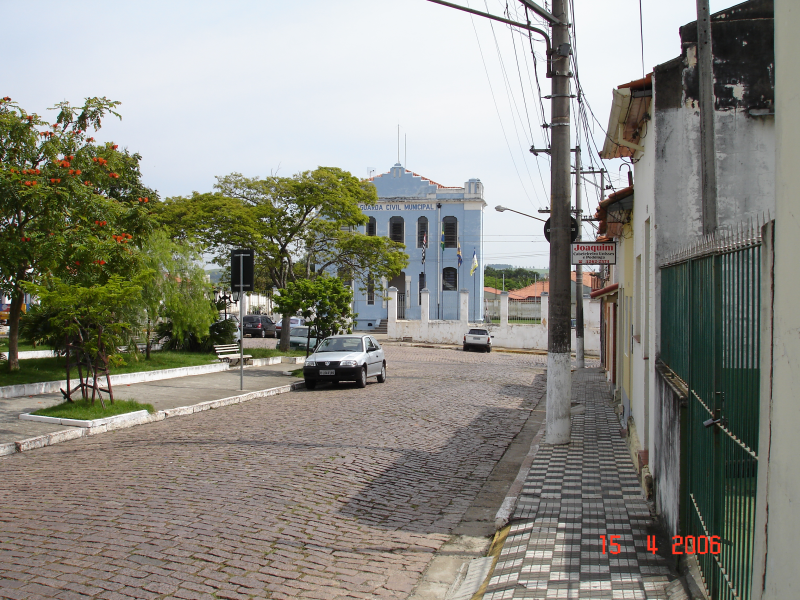
- A street in downtown Porto Feliz

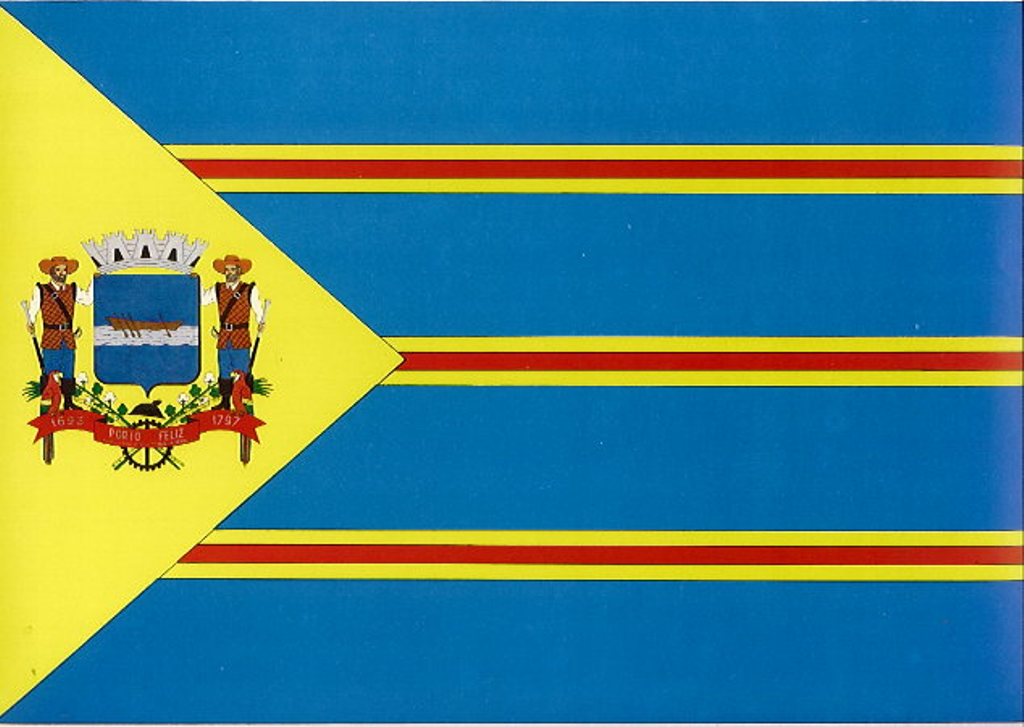
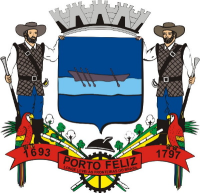
- Flag Coat of arms

- Location in São Paulo state

- Location in Brazil
- Coordinates: 23°12′53″S 47°31′26″W
- Country: Brazil
- Region: Southeast Brazil
- State: São Paulo
- Metropolitan Region: Sorocaba
- Founded: October 13, 1797

Government
  - Prefeito: Antonio Cassio Habice Prado (PTB)

Area
  - Total: 556.69 km^{2} (214.94 sq mi)
- Elevation: 523 m (1,716 ft)

Population (2020)
  - Total: 53,402
  - Density: 95.928/km^{2} (248.45/sq mi)
- Time zone: UTC−3 (BRT)
- Website: www.portofeliz.sp.gov.br

Porto Feliz (Portuguese: Happy Haven) is a municipality in the Brazilian state of São Paulo. It is part of the Metropolitan Region of Sorocaba. The population is 53,402 (2020 est.) in an area of 556.69 km^{2}. The elevation is 523 m. The largest factory in the city called a Porto Feliz S/A is responsible for the demand for corrugated cardboard packaging of the entire state and all Brazil. The mother of Queen Silvia of Sweden, Alice Soares de Toledo, was born in this city.

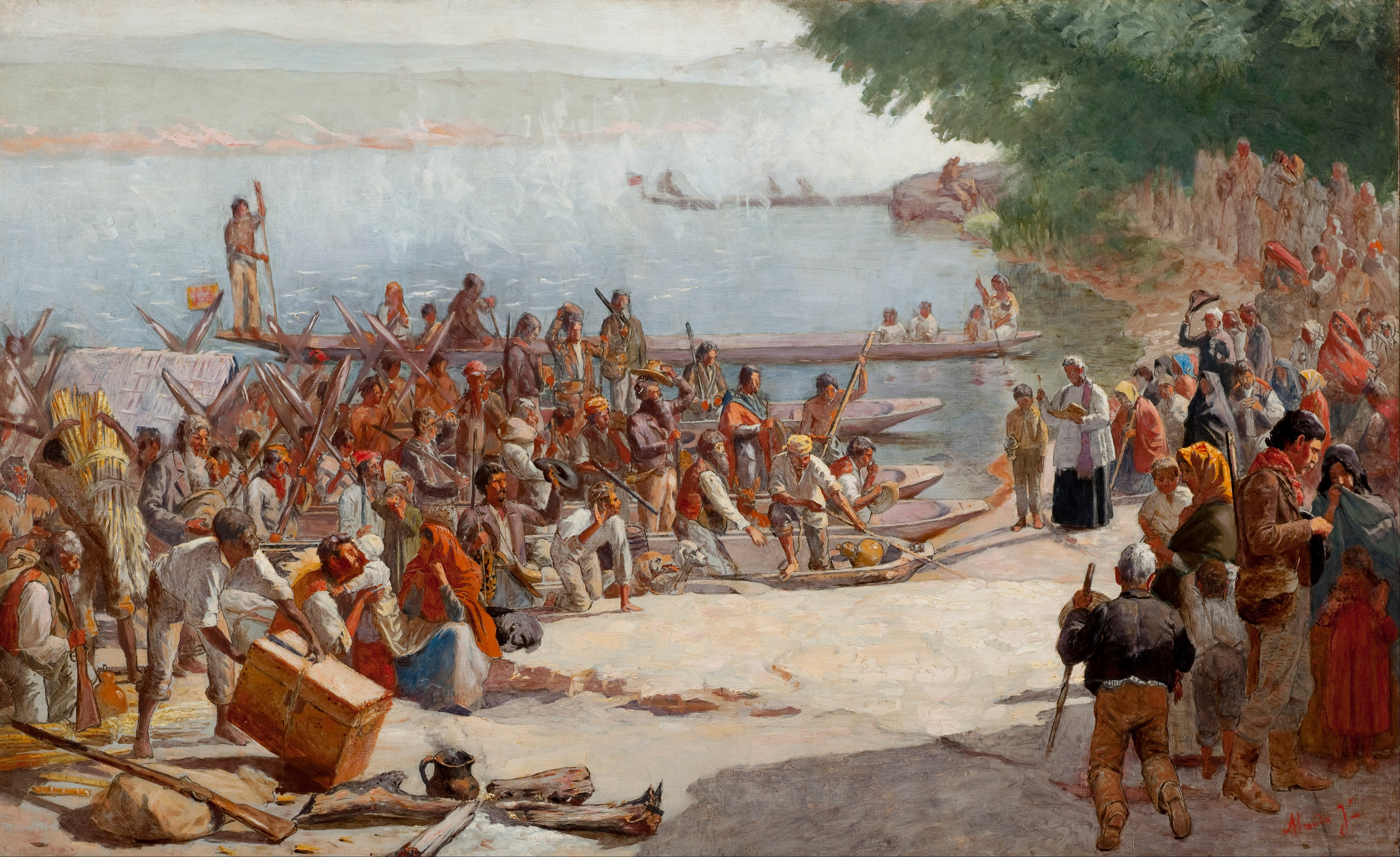
River expedition from Port of Araritaguaba (now Porto Feliz), Tietê River (Almeida Júnior, 1897, oil on canvas)

== Media ==
In telecommunications, the city was served by Companhia Telefônica Brasileira until 1973, when it began to be served by Telecomunicações de São Paulo. In July 1998, this company was acquired by Telefónica, which adopted the Vivo brand in 2012.

The company is currently an operator of cell phones, fixed lines, internet (fiber optics/4G) and television (satellite and cable).

== See also ==
- List of municipalities in São Paulo
- Interior of São Paulo
