= Salto, São Paulo =

Salto
- Municipality
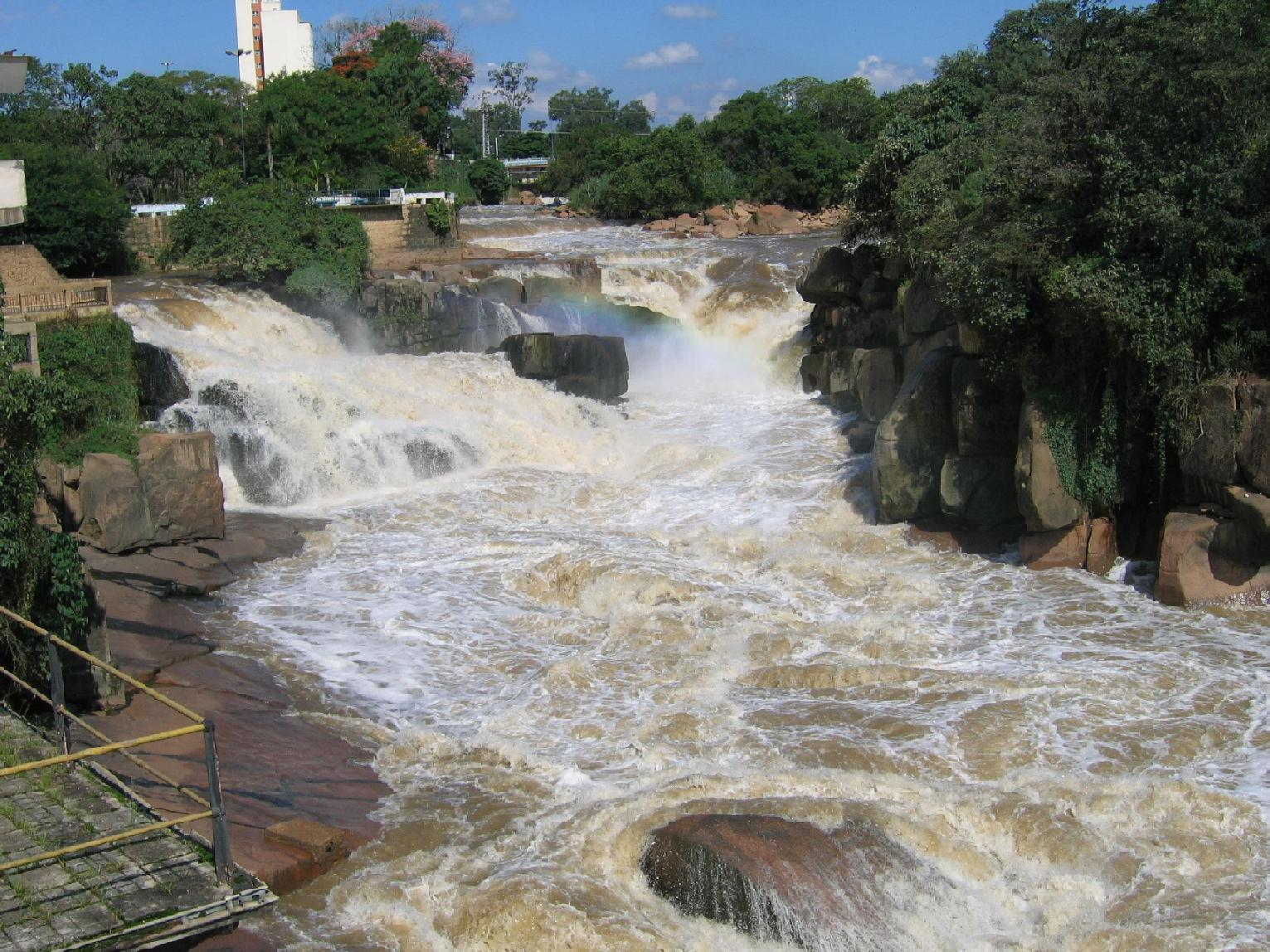
- View of the Tietê River, through the dam of Salto

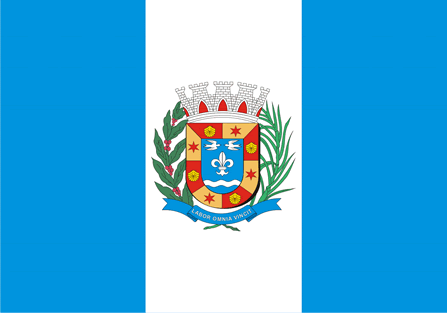
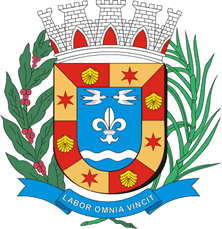
- Flag Coat of arms

- Location in São Paulo state

- Location in Brazil
- Coordinates: 23°12′3″S 47°17′13″W
- Country: Brazil
- Region: Southeast Brazil
- State: São Paulo
- Metropolitan Region: Sorocaba
- Microregion: Sorocaba

Government
  - Prefect: Juvenil Cirelli (PT)

Area
  - Total: 133.06 km^{2} (51.37 sq mi)
- Elevation: 555 m (1,821 ft)

Population (2022 Census)
  - Total: 134,319
  - Estimate (2025): 141,111
  - Density: 1,009.5/km^{2} (2,614.5/sq mi)
- Time zone: UTC-3 (BRT)
  - Summer (DST): UTC-2 (BRST)
- Website: www.salto.sp.gov.br

Salto (Brazilian Portuguese: [ˈsawtu]) is a municipality in the state of São Paulo in Brazil. It is part of the Metropolitan Region of Sorocaba. The population is 119,736 (2020 est.) in an area of 133.06 km^{2} (51.37 sq mi). The elevation is 555 m. The city has one main river, rio Tietê. The city has an important geological park, the Moutonée Park.

== Media ==
In telecommunications, the city was served by Companhia Telefônica Brasileira until 1973, when it began to be served by Telecomunicações de São Paulo. In July 1998, this company was acquired by Telefónica, which adopted the Vivo brand in 2012.

The company is currently an operator of cell phones, fixed lines, internet (fiber optics/4G) and television (satellite and cable).

== See also ==
- List of municipalities in São Paulo
- Interior of São Paulo
