= Vargem Grande Paulista =

- Municipality
- Flag Coat of arms

- Location in São Paulo state

- Location in Brazil
- Coordinates: 23°36′10″S 47°1′33″W
- Country: Brazil
- Region: Southeast Brazil
- State: São Paulo
- Metropolitan Region: São Paulo

Area
  - Total: 42.49 km^{2} (16.41 sq mi)

Population (2020)
  - Total: 53,468
  - Density: 1,258/km^{2} (3,259/sq mi)
- Time zone: UTC−3 (BRT)

Vargem Grande Paulista is a municipality in the state of São Paulo in Brazil. It is part of the Metropolitan Region of São Paulo. The population is 53,468 (2020 est.) in an area of 42.49 km^{2}.

== Demography ==
Historical population (municipality)
Year	Population	%±
1991	15,870	—
2000	32,683	105.9%
2010	42,997	31.6%
2022	50,415	17.3%

== Media ==
In telecommunications, the city was served by Telecomunicações de São Paulo. In July 1998, this company was acquired by Telefónica, which adopted the Vivo brand in 2012. The company is currently an operator of cell phones, fixed lines, internet (fiber optics/4G) and television (satellite and cable).

== Religion ==
Christianity is present in the city as follows:

=== Catholic Church ===
The Catholic church in the municipality is part of the Diocese of Osasco.

=== Protestant Church ===
The most diverse evangelical beliefs are present in the city, mainly Pentecostal, including the Assemblies of God in Brazil (the largest evangelical church in the country), Christian Congregation in Brazil, among others. These denominations are growing more and more throughout Brazil.

== See also ==
- List of municipalities in São Paulo
