= Boituva =

Municipality in the state of São Paulo in Brazil

- Municipality
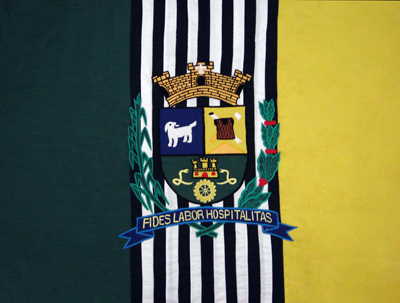
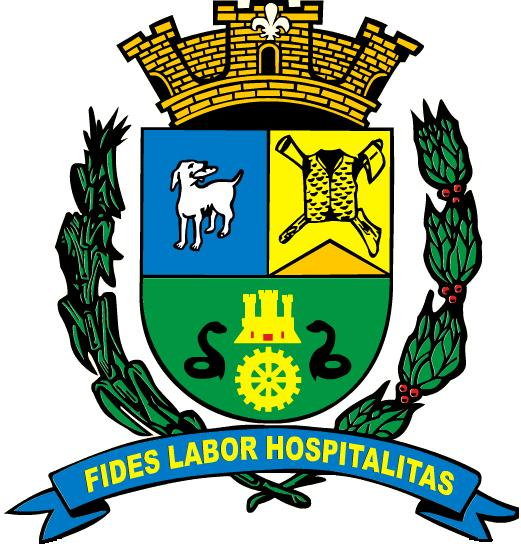
- Flag Coat of arms
- Nickname: National Skydive Capital
- Motto: Fides, Labor, Hospitalitas (Latin: Fidelity, Work, Hospitality)
- Location in São Paulo state

- Location in Brazil
- Coordinates: 23°17′0″S 47°40′20″W
- Country: Brazil
- Region: Southeast Brazil
- State: São Paulo
- Metropolitan Region: Sorocaba

Area
  - Total: 248.97 km^{2} (96.13 sq mi)
- Elevation: 637 m (2,090 ft)

Population (2020)
  - Total: 62,170
  - Density: 249.7/km^{2} (646.7/sq mi)
- Time zone: UTC-3 (BRT)
  - Summer (DST): UTC-2 (BRST)
- Website: boituva.sp.gov.br

Boituva is a municipality in the state of São Paulo in Brazil. It is part of the Metropolitan Region of Sorocaba. The population is 62,170 (2020 est.) in an area of 248.97 km^{2}. The elevation is 637 metres.

It is known as the "National Skydive Capital". In Tupi, Boituva means "many snakes".

== History ==
The first inhabitants that formed the settlement called at that time Boituva Fields, began settling here in the late 18th century according to official history.

Some scholars affirm that the pioneers of Boituva arrived by train, the former Sorocabana Railway. Others, however assert that the first inhabitants were ex-workers of the then extinct iron smeltery on Ipanema farm, thus closed, forcing them to acquire neighboring lands.

In the second or third decade Boituva gained fame – and is known until today – as The Land of Pineapple, since the first culture on a large scale was pineapple. The quality of the fruit was such that it was awarded a gold medal in a national level exposition, realized in São Paulo, thus emerging the Boituvana variety of pineapple.

The political-administrative emancipation of Boituva occurred on September 6, 1937, the date of which is now commemorated with the celebration known as Boituvana.

On 11 May 2022 a LBK Serviço Aéreo Especializado, operating for Skydive4Fun, Cessna 208 Caravan registration PT-OQR, during initial climb from Boituva-Centro Nacional de Páraquedismo Airfield, SP (SDOI) crashed in a field due to a loss of engine power and come to rest inverted next to a transmission tower. Two of the 16 occupants died of their injuries sustained in the accident.

== Demographics ==
Historical population (municipality)
Year	Population	%±
1940	7,674	—
1950	8,057	5.0%
1960	10,138	25.8%
1970	8,976	−11.5%
1980	12,573	40.1%
1991	23,140	84.0%
2000	34,368	48.5%
2010	48,314	40.6%
2022	61,081	26.4%

== Media ==
In telecommunications, the city was served by Companhia Telefônica Brasileira until 1973, when it began to be served by Telecomunicações de São Paulo. In July 1998, this company was acquired by Telefónica, which adopted the Vivo brand in 2012.

The company is currently an operator of cell phones, fixed lines, internet (fiber optics/4G) and television (satellite and cable).

== Hymn ==
(in Portuguese) (Music and lyrics by Roberto Resendo Camargo)

No antigo bairro "Campo de Boituva", desbravadores chegando aqui
Chamaram-te "Mboy-tuba" - muitas cobras, na lingua indígena tupí
A terra abençoada e prometida da fé que faz a força do labor
Da hospitalidade e o dom de bem servir
Ao próximo com muito amor!

(Chorus)
Boituva, boituva, terra onde reside a paz...
Quem chegou ficou, quem partiu chorou,
E não te esquece nunca mais!

O trem de ferro da "Sorocabana" fez o progresso chegar aqui...
Na época a cidade criou fama com as lavouras do abacaxi,
Depois o algodão e hoje a cana, são frutos do teu solo produtor,
Uniram-se a industria e o comércio aos ideais do agricultor.

(Chorus)

As chácaras, o camping, as fazendas, os grandes haras, tudo isso faz
Àqueles que procuram o aconchego, em teu sossego buscar a paz...
O centro do civil paraquedismo, O polo do turismo e do lazer...
Boituva nós sentimos ufanismo: é ótimo seu filho ser.

(Chorus)

O povo te dedica uma semana: a "Boituvana" que é tradição...
A "Águia da Castelo" se engalana e te proclama com emoção.
E ao comemorar seis de setembro, relembra teu passado triunfal,
E faz do seu presente uma certeza:
Que hoje és glória regional!

(Chorus)

== See also ==
- List of municipalities in São Paulo
- Interior of São Paulo
