= Mairinque =

Municipality in Southeast Brazil

- Municipality
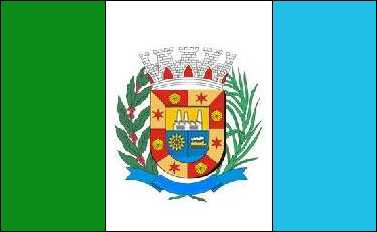
- Flag Coat of arms

- Location in São Paulo state

- Location in Brazil
- Coordinates: 23°32′47″S 47°11′01″W
- Country: Brazil
- Region: Southeast
- State: São Paulo
- Microregion: Sorocaba
- Metrop. region: Sorocaba

Area
  - Total: 210.15 km^{2} (81.14 sq mi)
- Elevation: 850 m (2,790 ft)

Population (2020)
  - Total: 47,441
  - Density: 225.75/km^{2} (584.69/sq mi)
- Time zone: UTC−3 (BRT)
- Postal code: 18120-000
- Area code: +55 11
- Website: www.mairinque.sp.gov.br

Mairinque is a municipality near Sorocaba, in the state of São Paulo in Brazil. It is part of the Metropolitan Region of Sorocaba. The population is 47,441 (2020 est.) in an area of 210.15 km^{2}. It is at an elevation of 850 m (2,955 ft). It is situated in the central part of the state of São Paulo, 70 km from the state capital.

== History ==
First known as Vila Mayrink, the town grew around a railway junction. It is named after Francisco de Paula Mayrink, railway entrepreneur and politician in the First Brazilian Republic. It was part of the municipality of São Roque until it became a separate municipality under the name "Mairinque" in 1959.

== Geography ==
The city's hinterland contains mountains and valleys. Its climate is temperate and dry, with an average temperature of 18 °C.

Since the creation of an industrial park, the city has grown markedly, with a boom in activity in its public, private and social sectors. Urban change has been rapid, with considerable commercial development.

== Demography ==
Historical population (municipality)
Year	Population	%±
1960	11,741	—
1970	18,858	60.6%
1980	30,828	63.5%
1991	43,205	40.1%
2000	39,975	−7.5%
2010	43,223	8.1%
2022	50,027	15.7%

=== Demographics ===
According to the 2000 IBGE Census, the population was 39,975, of which most, some 34,240, are urban and 5,635 are rural. The average life expectancy was 72.42 years. The literacy rate was at 92.79%.

== Economy ==
Many companies have head offices or regional offices in the city, including Cargill, Ibratele, Intertech, Agrosthal, Fiorella, Soldatopo, Chocolates Prink, Ferplast, Etrúria and Centrais de Estocagem Frigorificada (CEFRI).

== Transportation ==
Mairinque is surrounded by several other cities, such as the port of Santos (153 km away), Campinas (114 km) and Sorocaba (30 km). It is connected with São Paulo by two major highways, the Rodovia Raposo Tavares and Rodovia Castelo Branco. Several companies offer bus services to neighbouring cities.

== Media ==
In telecommunications, the city was served by Companhia Telefônica Brasileira until 1973, when it began to be served by Telecomunicações de São Paulo. In July 1998, this company was acquired by Telefónica, which adopted the Vivo brand in 2012.

The company is currently an operator of cell phones, fixed lines, internet (fiber optics/4G) and television (satellite and cable).

== Religion ==
Christianity is present in the city as follows:

=== Catholic Church ===
The Catholic church in the municipality is part of the Diocese of Osasco.

=== Protestant Church ===
The most diverse evangelical beliefs are present in the city, mainly Pentecostal, including the Assemblies of God in Brazil (the largest evangelical church in the country), Christian Congregation in Brazil, among others. These denominations are growing more and more throughout Brazil.

== See also ==
- List of municipalities in São Paulo
- Interior of São Paulo
