= Capela do Alto =

Municipality in the state of São Paulo in Brazil

- Municipality
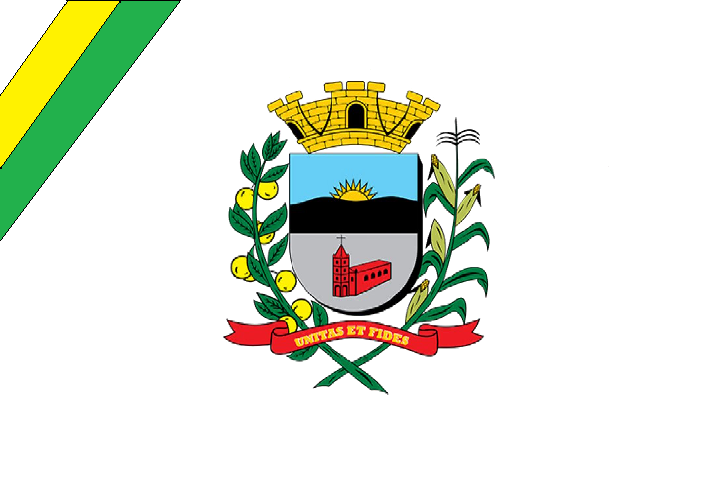
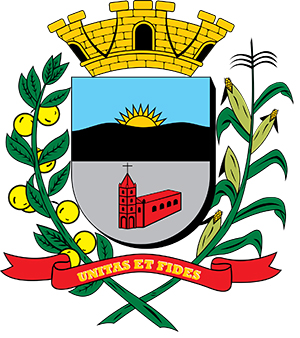
- Flag Coat of arms

- Location in São Paulo state

- Location in Brazil
- Coordinates: 23°28′14″S 47°44′05″W
- Country: Brazil
- Region: Southeast
- State: São Paulo
- Metrop. region: Sorocaba

Area
  - Total: 169.89 km^{2} (65.59 sq mi)
- Elevation: 625 m (2,051 ft)

Population (2020)
  - Total: 20,985
  - Density: 123.52/km^{2} (319.92/sq mi)
- Time zone: UTC−3 (BRT)
- Postal code: 18195
- Area code: +55 15
- Website: www.capeladoalto.sp.gov.br

Capela do Alto is a municipality in the state of São Paulo in Brazil. It is part of the Metropolitan Region of Sorocaba. The population is 20,985 (2020 est.) in an area of 169.89 km^{2}. The elevation is 625 m.

== Population history ==
Historical population
Year	Pop.	±%
2001	14,247	—
2004	16,030	+12.5%
2015	19,482	+21.5%

== Demographics ==
According to the 2000 IBGE Census, the population was 14,247, of which 11,111 are urban and 3,136 are rural. The average life expectancy was 69.31 years. The literacy rate was 89.43%.

== Media ==
In telecommunications, the city was served by Companhia de Telecomunicações do Estado de São Paulo until 1973, when it began to be served by Telecomunicações de São Paulo. In July 1998, this company was acquired by Telefónica, which adopted the Vivo brand in 2012.

The company is currently an operator of cell phones, fixed lines, internet (fiber optics/4G) and television (satellite and cable).

== See also ==
- List of municipalities in São Paulo
- Interior of São Paulo
