= Pirapora do Bom Jesus =

- Municipality
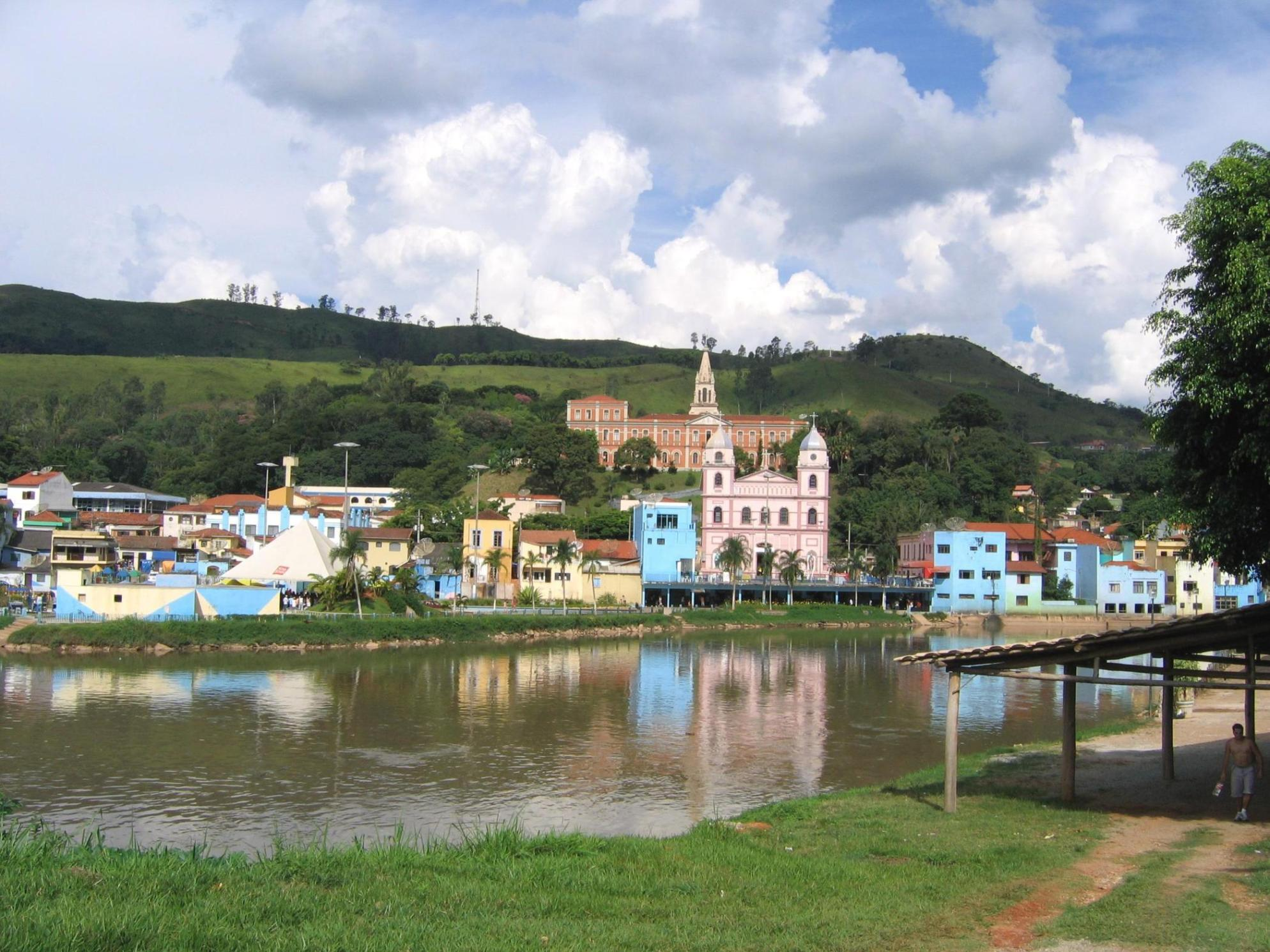
- The church

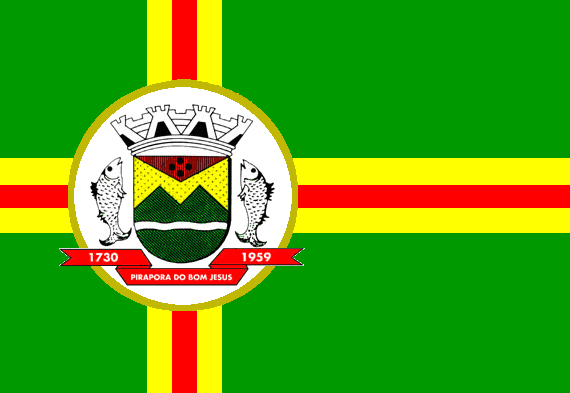
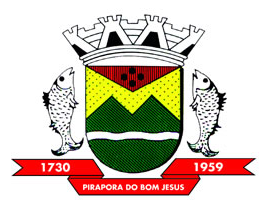
- Flag Coat of arms

- Location in São Paulo state

- Location in Brazil
- Coordinates: 23°23′50″S 47°0′10″W
- Country: Brazil
- Region: Southeast Brazil
- State: São Paulo
- Metropolitan Region: São Paulo

Area
  - Total: 108.49 km^{2} (41.89 sq mi)

Population (2020)
  - Total: 19,178
  - Density: 176.77/km^{2} (457.84/sq mi)
- Time zone: UTC−3 (BRT)

Pirapora do Bom Jesus is a municipality in the state of São Paulo in Brazil. It is part of the Metropolitan Region of São Paulo.

The population is 19,178 (2020 est.) in an area of 108.49 km^{2}. The name Pirapora comes from the Tupi language.

== Culture ==
Pirapora is the biggest Brazilian shrine after Aparecida. A sculpture of the Good Jesus is venerated here.

== Notable residents ==
- Bruno Caboclo (born 1995), basketball player in the Israeli Basketball Premier League
- Elias Silvério (born 1986), mixed martial artist

== See also ==
- Pirapora
- List of municipalities in São Paulo
