= Araçariguama =

Municipality in the state of São Paulo in Brazil

- Municipality
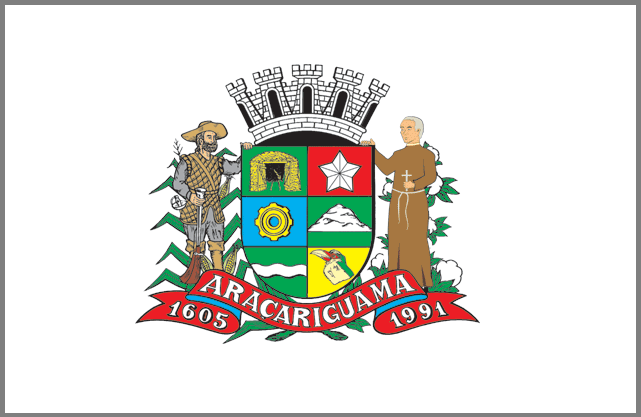
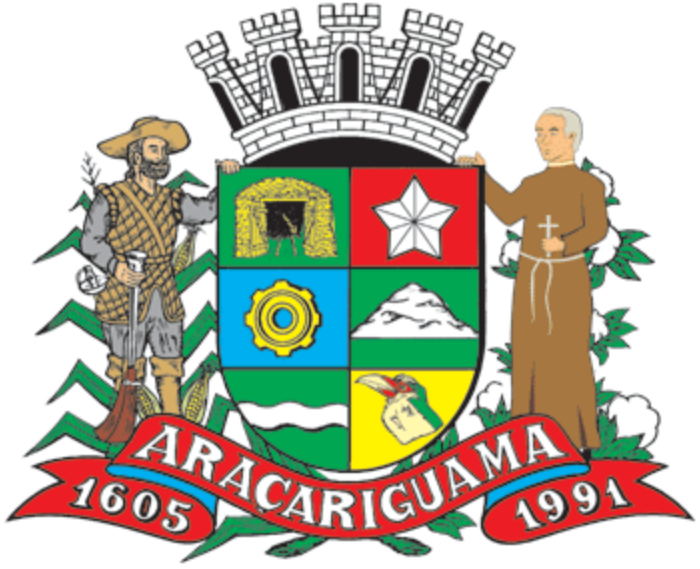
- Flag Coat of arms

- Location in São Paulo state

- Location in Brazil
- Coordinates: 23°26′19″S 47°03′41″W
- Country: Brazil
- Region: Southeast
- State: São Paulo
- Metrop. region: Sorocaba

Area
  - Total: 145.20 km^{2} (56.06 sq mi)
- Elevation: 695 m (2,280 ft)

Population (2020)
  - Total: 22,860
  - Density: 157.4/km^{2} (407.8/sq mi)
- Time zone: UTC−3 (BRT)
- Postal code: 18147
- Area code: +55 11
- Website: www.aracariguama.sp.gov.br

Araçariguama is a city on the state of São Paulo in Brazil. It is part of the Metropolitan Region of Sorocaba. The population of city is of 22,860 (2020 est.) in an area of 145.20 km^{2}. The elevation is 695 m. Araçariguama was established in 1653.

== Demography ==
Historical population (municipality)
Year	Population	%±
1920	4,310
2000	11,154	—
2010	17,080	53.1%
2022	21,522	26.0%

Obs: According to the 2000 IBGE Census, the population was 11,154, of which 7,240 are urban and 3,914 are rural. The average life expectancy was 69.03 years. The literacy rate was 89.99%.

== Media ==
In telecommunications, the city was served by Telecomunicações de São Paulo. In July 1998, this company was acquired by Telefónica, which adopted the Vivo brand in 2012. The company is currently an operator of cell phones, fixed lines, internet (fiber optics/4G) and television (satellite and cable).

== Religion ==
Christianity is present in the city as follows:

=== Catholic Church ===
The Catholic church in the municipality is part of the Diocese of Osasco.

=== Protestant Church ===
The most diverse evangelical beliefs are present in the city, mainly Pentecostal, including the Assemblies of God in Brazil (the largest evangelical church in the country), Christian Congregation in Brazil, among others. These denominations are growing more and more throughout Brazil.

== See also ==
- List of municipalities in São Paulo
- Interior of São Paulo
