= Salto de Pirapora =

- Municipality
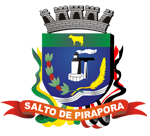
- Flag Coat of arms

- Location in São Paulo state

- Location in Brazil
- Coordinates: 23°38′56″S 47°34′24″W
- Country: Brazil
- Region: Southeast Brazil
- State: São Paulo
- Metropolitan Region: Sorocaba

Area
  - Total: 280.70 km^{2} (108.38 sq mi)
- Elevation: 630 m (2,070 ft)

Population (2020)
  - Total: 45,860
  - Density: 163.4/km^{2} (423.1/sq mi)
- Time zone: UTC−3 (BRT)

Salto de Pirapora (Brazilian Portuguese pronunciation: [ˈsawtu dʒi piɾɐˈpɔɾɐ]) is a municipality in the state of São Paulo in Brazil. It is part of the Metropolitan Region of Sorocaba. The population is 45,860 (2020 est.) in an area of 280.70 km^{2} (108.38 sq mi). The elevation is 630 m (2,070 ft).

== Media ==
In telecommunications, the city was served by Companhia de Telecomunicações do Estado de São Paulo until 1975, when it began to be served by Telecomunicações de São Paulo. In July 1998, this company was acquired by Telefónica, which adopted the Vivo brand in 2012.

The company is currently an operator of cell phones, fixed lines, internet (fiber optics/4G) and television (satellite and cable).

== See also ==
- Cafundó language
- List of municipalities in São Paulo
- Interior of São Paulo
