= Cerquilho =

Municipality in the state of São Paulo in Brazil

- Municipality
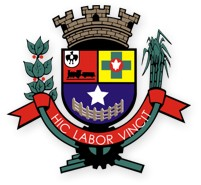
- Flag Coat of arms

- Location in São Paulo state

- Location in Brazil
- Coordinates: 23°9′54″S 47°44′37″W
- Country: Brazil
- Region: Southeast Brazil
- State: São Paulo
- Metropolitan Region: Sorocaba

Area
  - Total: 127.80 km^{2} (49.34 sq mi)
- Elevation: 595 m (1,952 ft)

Population (2020)
  - Total: 49,802
  - Density: 389.69/km^{2} (1,009.3/sq mi)
- Time zone: UTC−3 (BRT)

Cerquilho is a municipality in the state of São Paulo in Brazil. It is part of the Metropolitan Region of Sorocaba. The population is 49,802 (2020 est.) in an area of 127.80 km^{2} (49.34 sq mi). The elevation is 595 m.

== History ==
The municipality was created by state law in 1948.

Map of the state of São Paulo (1948).

== Media ==
In telecommunications, the city was served by Companhia Telefônica Brasileira until 1973, when it began to be served by Telecomunicações de São Paulo. In July 1998, this company was acquired by Telefónica, which adopted the Vivo brand in 2012.

The company is currently an operator of cell phones, fixed lines, internet (fiber optics/4G) and television (satellite and cable).

== See also ==
- List of municipalities in São Paulo
- Interior of São Paulo
