= São Miguel Arcanjo, São Paulo =

São Miguel Arcanjo
- Municipality
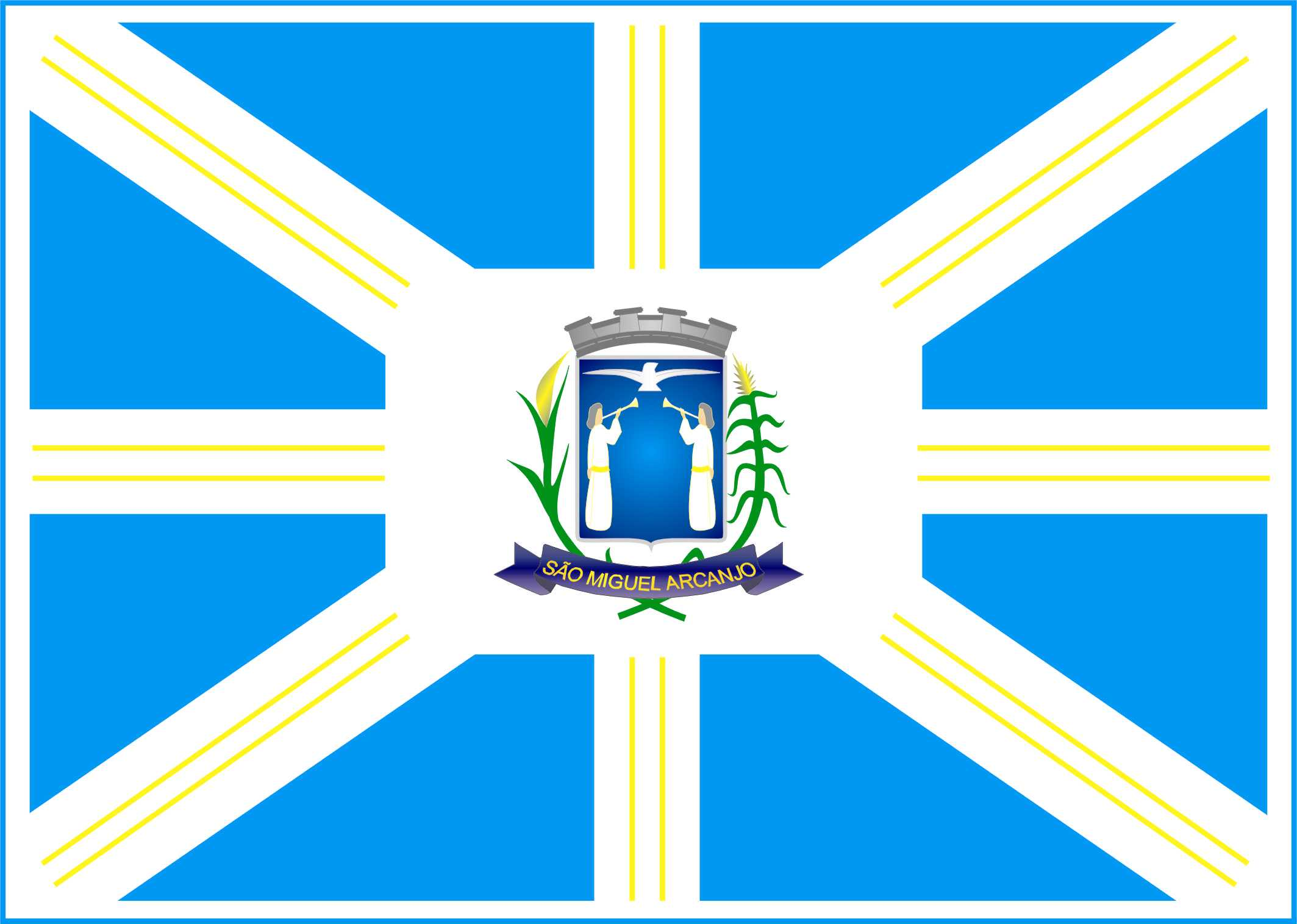
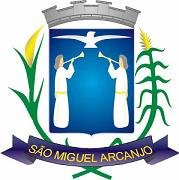
- Flag Coat of arms

- Location in São Paulo state

- Location in Brazil
- Coordinates: 23°52′42″S 47°59′50″W
- Country: Brazil
- Region: Southeast Brazil
- State: São Paulo
- Metropolitan Region: Sorocaba

Area
  - Total: 930.34 km^{2} (359.21 sq mi)

Population (2020)
  - Total: 33,002
  - Density: 35.473/km^{2} (91.875/sq mi)
- Time zone: UTC−3 (BRT)

São Miguel Arcanjo is a municipality in the state of São Paulo in Brazil founded on 1 April 1889. It is part of the Metropolitan Region of Sorocaba. The population is 33,002 (2020 est.) and it has an area of 930.34 km^{2}. The economy of São Miguel Arcanjo is mostly agricultural.

The municipality contains part of the 37,644-hectare (93,020-acre) Carlos Botelho State Park, created in 1982.

== History ==
The town was named after a chapel built in honor of St. Michael Archangel. The founders of São Miguel Arcanjo are Lt. Urias Emygdio Nogueira de Barros, known as Lt. Uriah, who moved here with his family in search of gold, and their two daughters: Maximina Nogueira Terra, who built the chapel, and Augusta Tereza Nogueira, who donated the land for construction.

== Media ==
In telecommunications, the city was served by Companhia de Telecomunicações do Estado de São Paulo until 1975, when it began to be served by Telecomunicações de São Paulo. In July 1998, this company was acquired by Telefónica, which adopted the Vivo brand in 2012.

The company is currently an operator of cell phones, fixed lines, internet (fiber optics/4G) and television (satellite and cable).

== See also ==
- List of municipalities in São Paulo
- Interior of São Paulo
