= Ipanema National Forest =

Protected area in São Paulo, Brazil

Coordinates: 23°25′54″S 47°37′08″W

The Ipanema National Forest (Portuguese: Floresta Nacional de Ipanema or FLONA de Ipanema) is a Brazilian conservation unit managed by the Chico Mendes Institute for Biodiversity Conservation (ICMBio). It is located in the interior of the state of São Paulo and covers parts of the municipalities of Araçoiaba da Serra, Iperó (Bacaetava district), and Capela do Alto.

The mission of the Ipanema National Forest is to protect, conserve, and restore the remnants of native vegetation within the Atlantic Forest biome, especially the Araçoiaba Hill and its associated environments, along with their natural, historical, and cultural attributes. It also aims to promote forest management, public use, and to serve as a reference in socio-environmental integration, research, and the dissemination of knowledge.

== History ==
The Ipanema National Forest was established by Presidential Decree No. 530, issued on May 20, 1992. When it was created, it was managed by the Brazilian Institute of Environment and Renewable Natural Resources (Ibama). It is currently administered by the Chico Mendes Institute for Biodiversity Conservation (ICMBio).

The FLONA holds testimonies of history, with archaeological sites that predate the arrival of the colonizers. These sites are protected by the dense forest of Araçoiaba Hill, a geological formation of volcanic origin, rich in mineral diversity, with magnetite being the predominant ore. Magnetite was used for iron production at the Royal Ironworks of St John.

The enterprise was founded by King Dom João VI in 1810, but iron extraction in the area had already been known since the 16th century, when the expedition of Afonso Sardinha and his son led to the construction of two forges in 1589. These forges are recognized by the World Steel Association as the first attempt at iron manufacturing on American soil.

== Characteristics ==
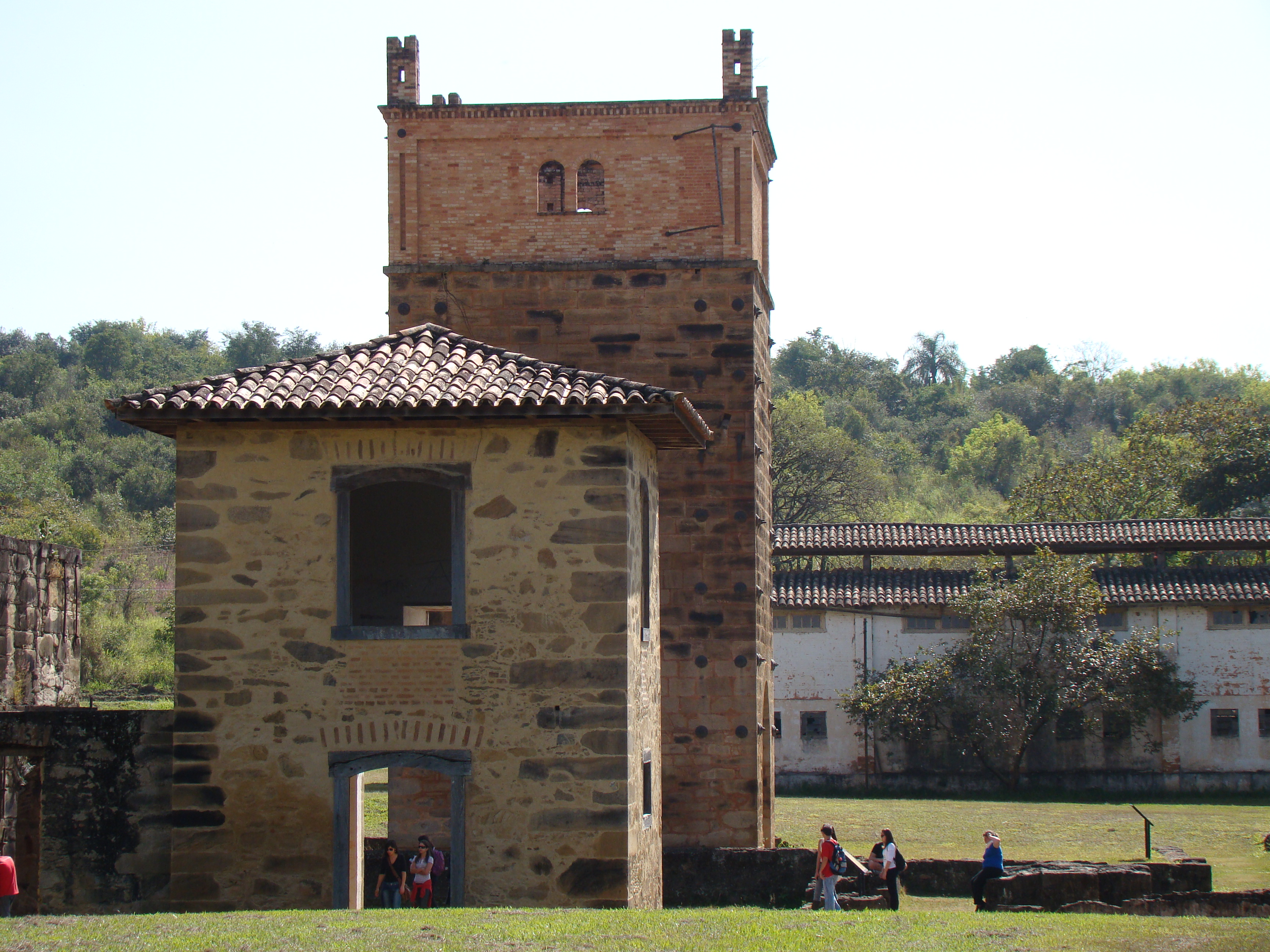
Part of the historical site of the Royal Ironworks of St John

With approximately 5,069 hectares of area, its vegetation is characterized as a transition between semideciduous seasonal forest and the São Paulo cerrado. Its fauna includes over 322 species of birds, 67 mammals, 18 amphibians, and 15 reptiles. Notable species include the maned wolf, ocelot, otter, crab-eating fox, tayra, giant anteater, king vulture, gray hawk, osprey, solitary tinamou, toco toucan, smith frog, urutu pit viper, rattlesnake, and black and white tegu.

In addition to its natural heritage, it is home to structures and remnants of the Royal Ironworks of St John, Ipanema. The FLONA also hosts Acadebio (the National Biodiversity Academy) of ICMBio.

== See also ==
- Fundição Ipanema
- Morro de Ipanema
