= Gil Rugai Case =

2004 murders in Sao Paulo, Brazil

- Location: São Paulo, Brazil
- Date: March 28, 2004; 21:30 (UTC-3)
- Attack type: Murder
- Weapon: Gun
- Deaths: 2
- Victims: Luiz Carlos Rugai; Alessandra de Fatima Troitino
- Defenders: Marcelo Feller; Rogerio Zagallo
- Accused: Gil Rugai
- Litigation: Criminal Court of Barra Funda
- Judge: Adilson Paukoski Simoni

The Gil Rugai Case refers to the murder, in 2004, by Gil Grego Rugai of his father Luiz Carlos Rugai and his stepmother Alessandra de Fátima Troitino. The case was included in the lists of crimes that impacted Brazil by Brasil Online (BOL) and Terra. The case was shown on the programs Criminal Investigation and Crime Doesn't Pay

== Case ==
Gil Grego Rugai would have embezzled more than 25 thousand reais to the company "Referencia Filmes", owned by his father, Luiz Carlos Rugai. For this reason, Gil was expelled from where he lived on March 22, 2004. Gil took care of the production company's accounting.

Around 9:30 pm on March 28, 2004, Luiz Carlos Rugai and Alessandra de Fátima Troitino, Gil Rugai's stepmother, were killed with eleven shots at the house where they lived on Rua Atibaia, in the neighborhood of Perdizes, in the West Zone of São Paulo. The day after the fact, the street watchman said he had seen Gil leaving his father's house on the night of the crime, in the company of another unidentified person.

== Investigation and conviction ==
A week later, the Technical-Scientific Police Expertise found the same cartridge fired by the weapon used in the murders in the student's room, at his father's house. On April 6, 2004, Gil Rugai was arrested after being indicted for double murder, but he denied the crime. The Prosecutor's Office alleged that it had as evidence the weapon used in the crime, found on June 25, 2005, more than a year after the murders, in the building where Gil Rugai had an office, as well as a footprint located on the broken-in door of the victims' house, which is consistent with that of the defendant.

Gil Rugai was imprisoned between 2004 and 2006, but was released by the Federal Supreme Court (STF). On September 9, 2008, he returned to jail after having his request for provisional release revoked at the request of the Public Ministry, for having moved to another city without notifying the judge; Rugai went to the city of Santa Maria to take the entrance exam.

The defense appealed and the student was released from the Tremembé penitentiary, in the interior of São Paulo, on February 10, 2010. Gil Rugai's trial was postponed twice, in 2011 and 2012, because of requests from the defense, which asked the Justice to carry out a new DNA test on the blood collected at the crime scene and on the accused. In addition, he asked for clarification from an expert.

In 2012, the defendant lived with his maternal grandmother, Conceição, and his routine was limited to going to mass every day. In 2013, he was sentenced to 33 years and 9 months in a closed regime for the murders, but judge Adilson Paukoski Simoni determined that the convict could appeal in freedom. Gil tried a new defense request in August 2020, but the Federal Supreme Court refused and upheld the conviction.

On November 16, 2021, Judge Sueli Zeraik de Oliveira Armani issued a decision allowing Gil Rugai to serve his sentence in a semi-open regime. On April 12 of the following year, at the request of the São Paulo Public Prosecutor's Office, the Justice revoked the decision and further determined that the Rorschach test should be performed .
