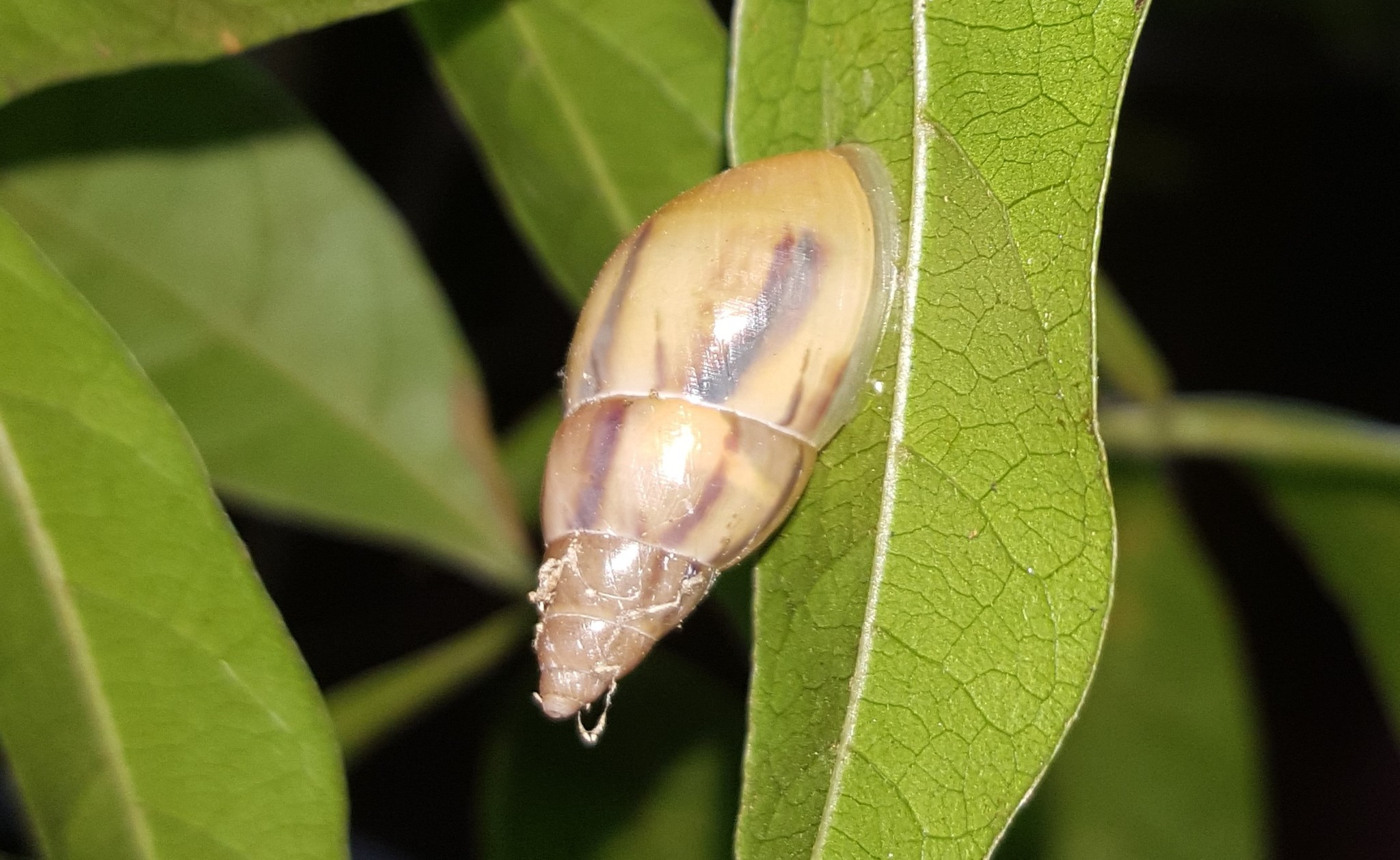
- A live specimen of Drymaeus semistriatus at Guarapiranga Reservoir, Brazil

Scientific classification
- Kingdom: Animalia
- Phylum: Mollusca
- Class: Gastropoda
- Order: Stylommatophora
- Family: Bulimulidae
- Genus: Drymaeus
- Species: D. semistriatus

Binomial name
- Drymaeus semistriatus F. Haas, 1955

Synonyms
- Drymaeus (Drymaeus) semistriatus F. Haas, 1955

= Drymaeus semistriatus =

Species of gastropod

Drymaeus semistriatus is a species of tropical air-breathing land snail, a pulmonate gastropod mollusc in the family Bulimulidae. It was first described in 1955, with the historical Fazenda Ipanema, located within the Ipanema National Forest in southeastern Brazil, as its type locality.

== Distribution and habitat ==
Drymaeus semistriatus is a species found only in Brazil, making it endemic to the country. It has been recorded in the southeastern states of Minas Gerais, specifically in the municipality of Juiz de Fora, and São Paulo. This species lives in forested environments, including areas like the Ipanema National Forest, which is part of Brazil’s richly biodiverse Atlantic Forest biome.
