= Interior of São Paulo =

São Paulo State Region

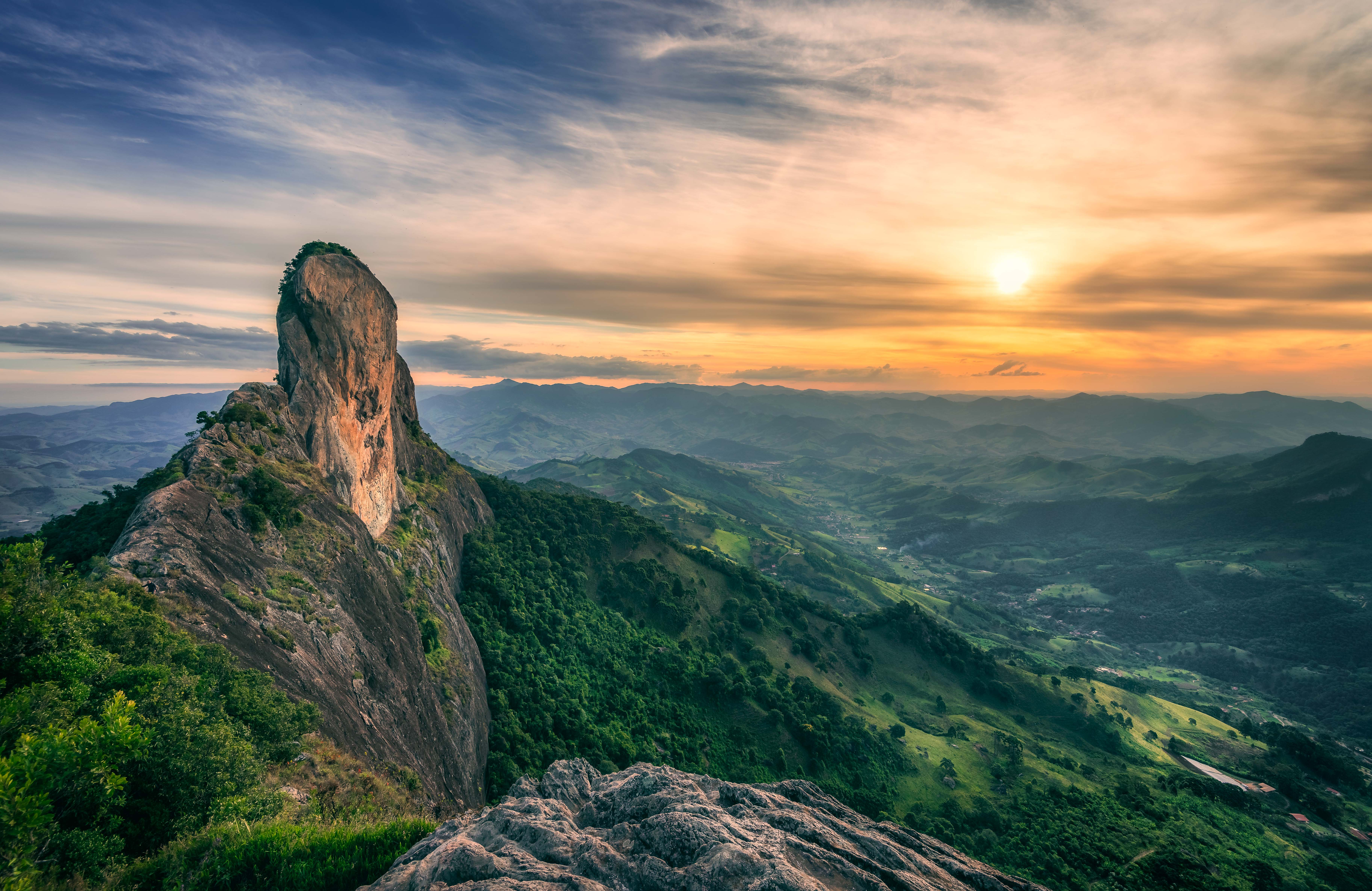
Pedra do Baú complex

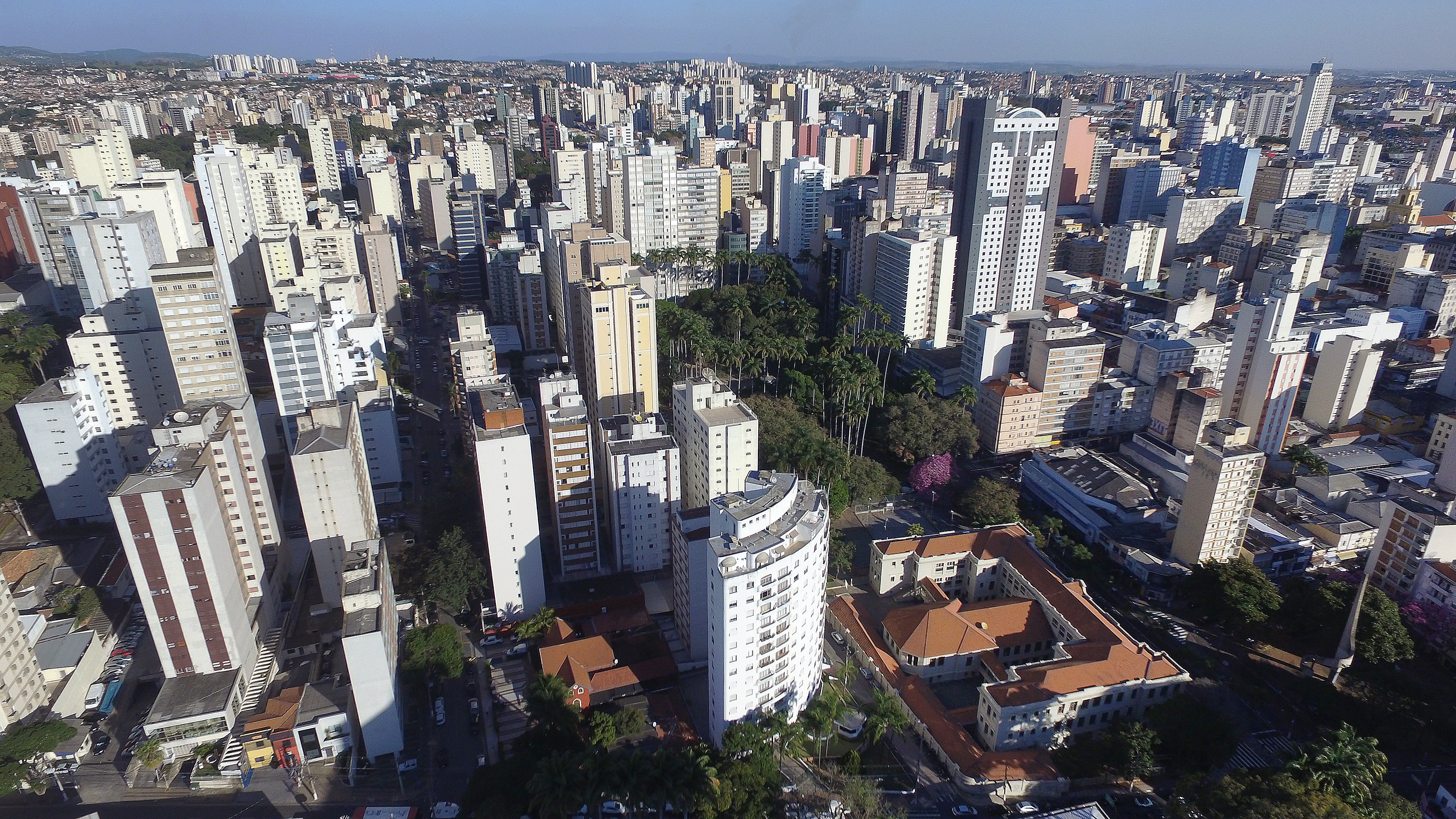
Campinas, the most populous city in the interior of São Paulo

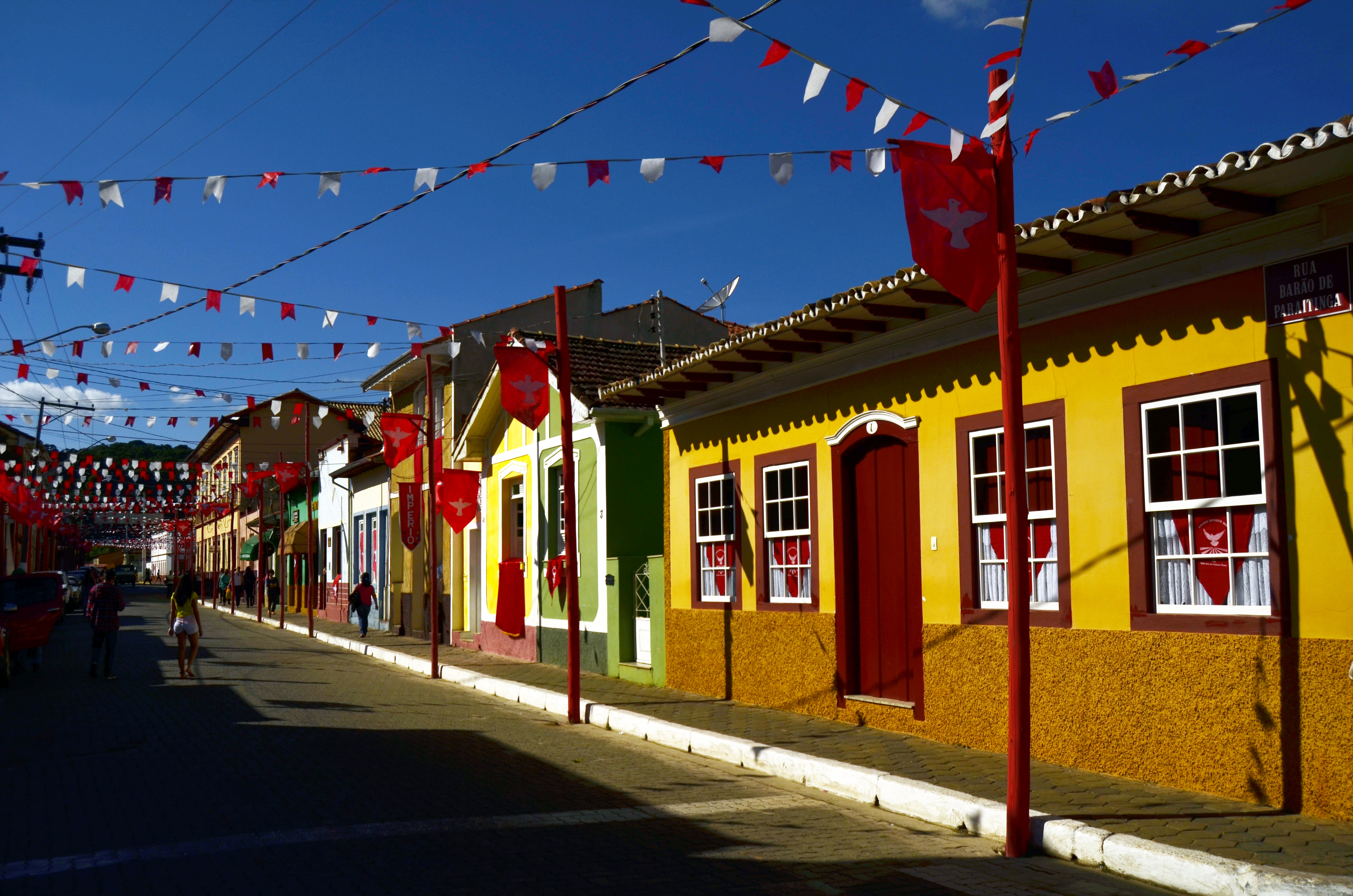
Historic Center of São Luiz do Paraitinga

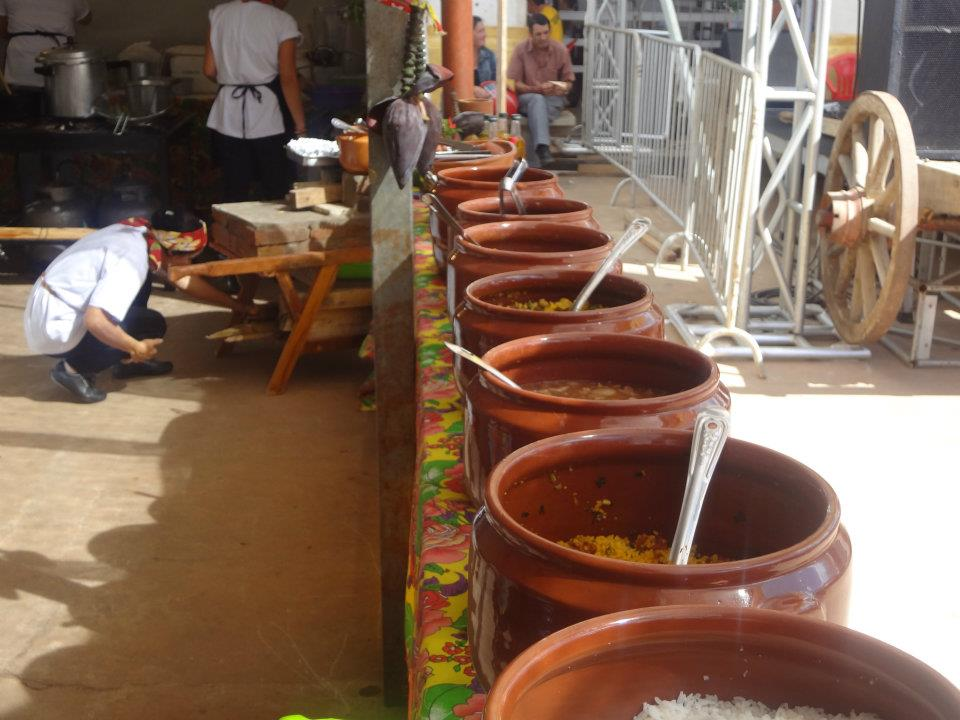
Typical country dishes during the Caipira Cousine Festival

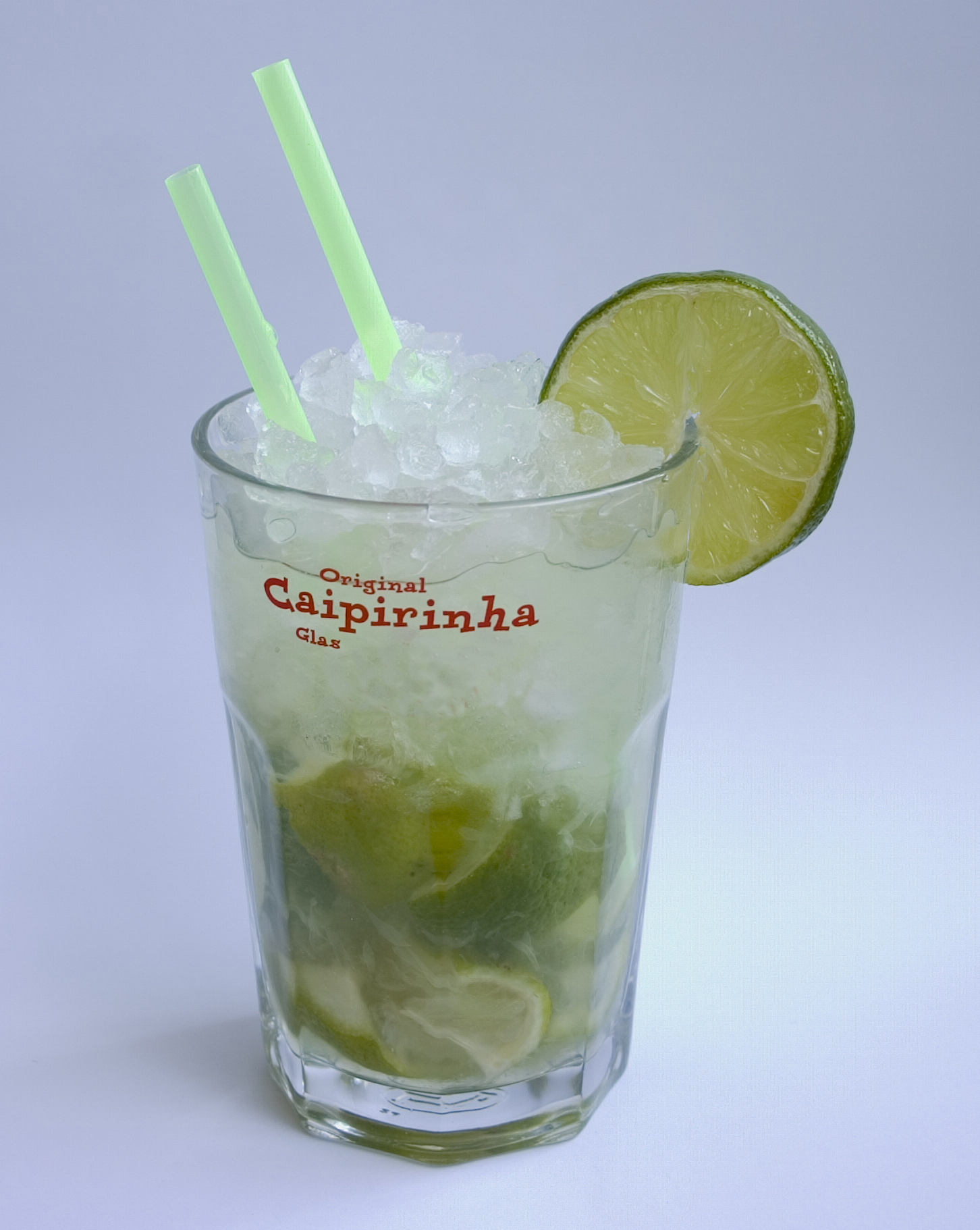
Caipirinha, originally from São Paulo

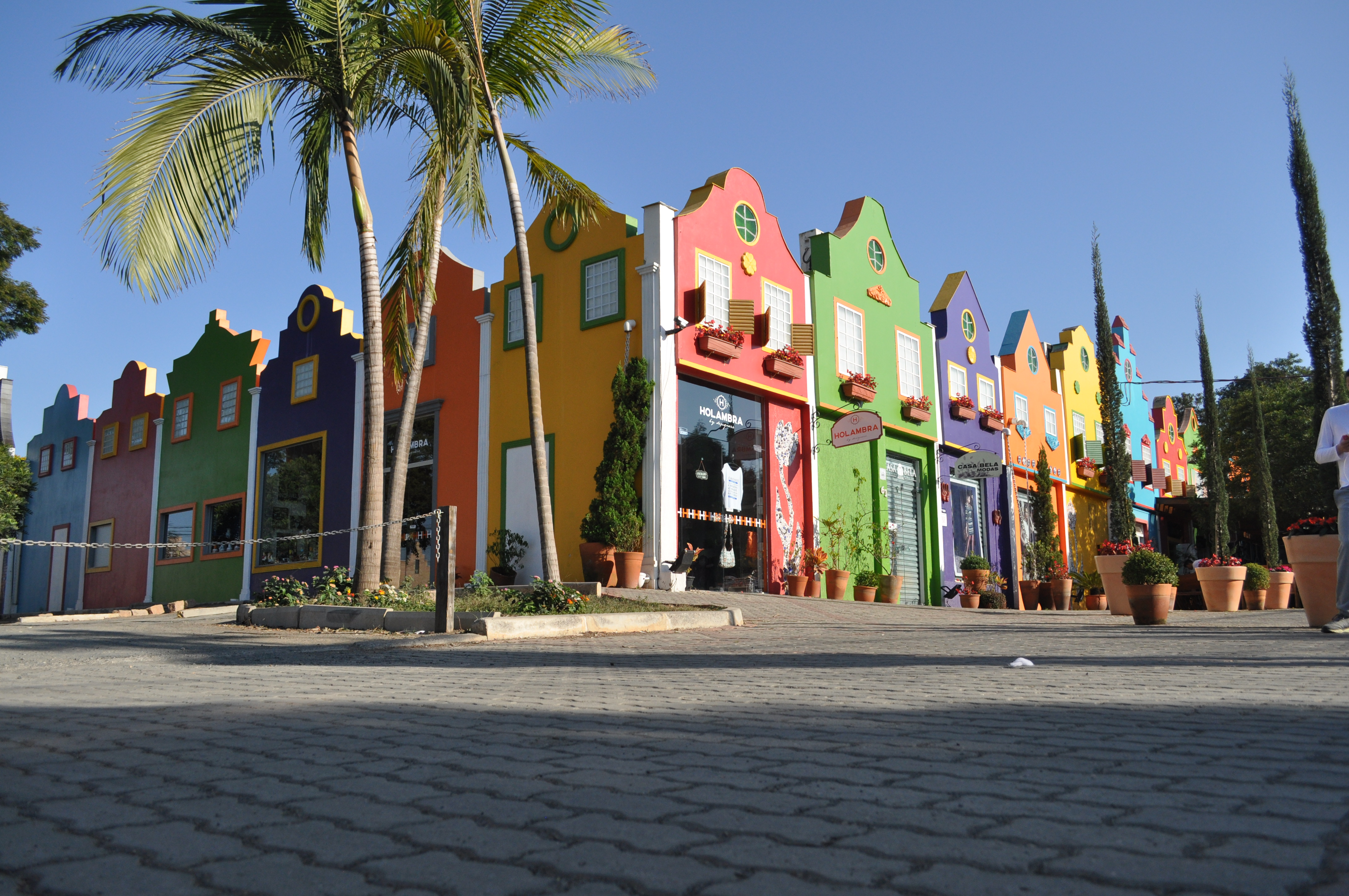
Holambra, the city of flowers

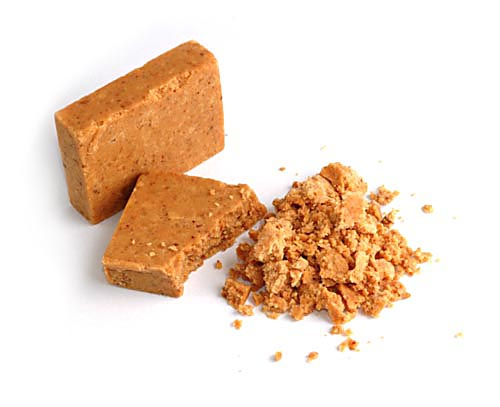
Paçoca, a sweet from the country cuisine of São Paulo

The interior of São Paulo is an informal term to describe the zone that covers the entire area of the state of São Paulo outside the Metropolitan Region and the coast of São Paulo. The interior stands out for having a very rich cultural set, including several unique accents different from those of the capital and the coast.

This area is densely industrialized and characterized by a large and diversified economy, being one of the richest regions in Latin America. About 1/4 of the interior's GDP is concentrated in the Metropolitan Region of Campinas, which is increasingly consolidating itself as the hub of the Brazilian automotive sector. The interior of São Paulo stands out for having a good infrastructure, becoming a pole of attraction for investments.

== History ==
=== 16th century – Beginning of the exploration of the territory ===
When the Portuguese arrived, there were a variety of indigenous tribes in the interior of São Paulo, predominantly from the macro-Jê linguistic group, such as the Kayapo, Xavante, Kaingang and Puri, and also territories inhabited by Guarani people.

In the 1560s, shortly after the founding of the town of São Paulo de Piratininga, the Paulistas, mostly caboclos (children of Portuguese settlers with indigenous women), began to explore the countryside in search of precious metals or to fight indigenous people according to the principle of fair warfare. One of the first expeditions of the Paulistas dates back to 1562, when João Ramalho left for the Paraíba Valley to fight the Guarani people who had surrounded São Paulo a short time before. In the 1580s, settlers from the towns of Santos, São Vicente and São Paulo departed on expeditions against the Guarani people in the valleys of the Tietê and Paraíba do Sul rivers. In 1585, Captain Major Jerônimo Leitão personally led a mission to Paranaguá to fight the native after requests from other settlers. During the 1590s, several punitive expeditions into the countryside were organized in retaliation for indigenous attacks on settlers and catechized Indians around São Paulo. Despite the defensive nature of these raids in retaliation for indigenous attacks, settlers often used them to obtain slave labor.

From the end of the 1580s, but especially in the 1590s, in addition to the punitive expeditions, there was an increase in the search for precious metals in the interior of São Paulo and Brazil. In 1589, Afonso Sardinha and his son of the same name discovered iron ore in the Ipanema Hill, which led to the construction of the first iron foundry in Brazil. In the same place, the first settlement of the interior of São Paulo was founded under the name of Vila de Nossa Senhora de Monte Serrat, but it declined due to the lack of gold in the area, with its inhabitants being transferred to the Itavuvu region, where Sorocaba is today, in 1611, by order of the governor-general of Brazil D. Francisco de Sousa; this settlement was also short-lived. In 1596, the Portuguese João de Sousa Pereira, also known as Botafogo, set out from São Paulo with at least 25 white settlers and a large number of natives in search of gold and precious stones in the valley of the São Francisco River, passing through the Paraíba Valley on the way, and also fighting hostile natives in the region.

=== 17th century – Settlement of the area and century of the bandeirantes ===
In the late 16th and early 17th centuries, the settlement of São Paulo territory, until then restricted to the coast and the Piratininga Plateau, expanded to the valleys of the Paraíba do Sul and Tietê rivers, which is probably related to the demand for new lands and bandeirantes.

In the first half of the 17th century, there was a large increase in the number of bandeirante expeditions. Sponsored by governor-general Francisco, the bandeirante André de Leão entered the Paraíba Valley in search of precious stones in the direction of the São Francisco River in 1601, followed a year later by another large expedition carried out by Nicolau Barreto, this time towards the mines of the Viceroyalty of Peru, down the Tietê River. Failing to find precious metals, Nicolau Barreto's expedition devastated the Paranapanema River Valley, enslaving around 2,000 indigenous people. Several other expeditions crossed the interior of São Paulo in this period, following the course of the Tietê River, such as those of Manuel Preto (1606), Belchior Dias Carneiro (1607), Martim Rodrigues Tenório de Aguiar (1608) and Antônio Raposo Tavares (1628). These expeditions had as their main objective the capture of indigenous people to enslave in the Spanish Jesuit missions in Guayrá, Paraguay and Siete Pueblos de las Misiones.

From the 1640s onwards, the decrease in the supply of Guarani natives led the São Paulo settlers to redirect their captivity expeditions towards the Paraíba Valley, contributing to the elevation of the settlements of Taubaté (1645), Guaratinguetá (1651) and Jacareí (1653) to the category of town; for the same reason, the settlements of Jundiaí (1656), Itu (1657) and Sorocaba (1661), in the west and northwest, were also promoted to the category of town. Based on a small agricultural economy and indigenous workforce, these villages supplied the expeditions that traveled through the area, as well as serving as a base for new missions. Despite being elevated to the category of town in the 1640s, these settlements arose years or even decades earlier: Taubaté was founded by the bandeirante Jacques Félix in 1639 with the construction of a chapel in honor of St. Francis of the Wounds; Félix also founded Guaratinguetá in 1630, with the construction of a chapel dedicated to Saint Anthony; Jacareí appeared in 1652 under the name of Nossa Senhora da Conceição do Paraíba, founded by Antônio Afonso; in the 1640s, Rafael de Oliveira settled where Jundiaí is today and his namesake son built a chapel in honor of Our Lady of the Exile in 1651; in 1610, Itu emerged with the construction of the chapel in honor of Our Lady of the Light by the bandeirante Domingos Fernandes (he also participated in the mission of Belchior Dias Carneiro, in 1607); and Sorocaba, which had already had two primitive settlements that did not succeed (Nossa Senhora de Monte Serrat and São Felipe do Itavuvu), was permanently founded with the construction of the chapel of Our Lady of the Bridge (today the monastery of São Bento), in 1654, by the bandeirante Baltasar Fernandes.

Still in the 17th century, the Paulistas also formed the settlements of Araçariguama (1605), Pindamonhangaba (1643 or 1672), São Roque (1657), Atibaia (1665) and Araritaguaba (today Porto Feliz, 1693).

In the second half of the 17th century, the focus of the expeditions was no longer the capture of indigenous people to enslave, but the search for precious stones in the interior of the colony, especially in the current territories of Goiás and Minas Gerais. Among the names of bandeirantes who searched for metals, the best known were Fernão Dias and Borba Gato.

=== 18th century – Mining expeditions and economic changes ===
Since the last decade of the 17th century, numerous expeditions left Taubaté mainly in the direction of the Mortes River in Minas Gerais, led by locals such as Tomé Portes del-Rei and his son-in-law Antônio Garcia da Cunha, discovering important gold deposits in the valley of this river in the early years of the 18th century, such as in the vicinity of Tiradentes (1702) and São João del-Rei (1704). To the west, using the Tietê River and starting from Porto Feliz, Moreira Cabral and Miguel Sutil discovered gold in the vicinity of Cuiabá between 1718 and 1722. Starting from São Paulo and passing through Jundiaí, the bandeirante Bartolomeu Bueno da Silva (son), known as Anhanguera, discovered gold in Goiás in 1725, forming, along the way, support centers that would become the settlements of Campinas, Mogi-Guaçu, Casa Branca, Batatais and Franca.

During the first half of the 18th century, slave labor still remained predominantly dependent on indigenous workforce, who came to be categorized as managed to circumvent legislation that increasingly restrained indigenous slavery. The complete transition from indigenous to African labor did not occur until the end of the century. Indigenous people worked on the cotton and other product farms, especially those that resupplied the expeditions to the interior of Brazil, as had already been done in the previous century. Porto Feliz, for example, served as a starting point for the monsoons to Mato Grosso, with natives also working in the manufacture of the canoes and in the transportation itself.

From the second half of the century, during the government of the Morgado de Mateus, there was an economic expansion of the captaincy of São Paulo with the introduction of sugar cane cultivation in the countryside, but without harming the diversified production of crops such as corn, beans and rice. New towns were founded, such as São José dos Campos (1767), which until then was an indigenous settlement; the villages of São Luiz do Paraitinga (1773), Cunha (1785) and Lorena (1788) were also elevated to the category of town in the Paraíba Valley. In the Jundiaí region, the parishes of Mogi Mirim (1769) and Atibaia (1769) ascended to the category of town, as well as Campinas (1774), which was raised to parish status, along with Bragança Paulista (1765) and Piracicaba (1767). In the southwest, in the Sorocaba region, Itapetininga (1770) and Itapeva (1769) were founded. Livestock was predominant in this region, with the transportation by mule between the cities of Sorocaba and Viamão, in Rio Grande do Sul, being of great importance for the towns and parishes on the way and causing the regular occurrence of the mule fairs of Sorocaba. In the region of Itu and Jundiaí, in addition to sugar production, the villages and towns served as supplies for the caravans that headed for Mato Grosso and Goiás on the roads opened at the beginning of the century. In the Paraíba Valley, besides sugar cane, the towns of the area supplied the mining region in the captaincy of Minas Gerais. At the end of the century, the "Quadrilátero do Açúcar" (English: Sugar Quadrilateral), an area delimited by the towns of Sorocaba, Piracicaba, Mogi Guaçu and Jundiaí, gained prominence due to the production of sugar for export.

Until the end of the 18th century, the common language spoken in the captaincy of São Paulo was Classical Tupi, known as paulista general, which was used in the day-to-day life of the predominantly mameluca population; this fact was noted by the Bishop of Olinda when he criticized the bandeirante Domingos Jorge Velho, who had been hired to put an end to Quilombo dos Palmares, claiming that he was basically a Tapuia native who did not even speak Portuguese. With the decree of the Marquis of Pombal in 1757 prohibiting its use, the paulista general language fell into disuse over time in favor of Portuguese, being spoken by the elders still in the 19th century and extinct only at the beginning of the 20th century. Despite this, its influence is still present today in the caipira dialect, which employs words of Tupi origin and also its phonetics.

=== 19th century – The coffee cycle ===
At the end of the 18th century and the first half of the 19th century, with the decline of gold mining in Minas Gerais, many miners settled in northeastern São Paulo, where they developed farming and cattle raising. They founded settlements, which were the basis of important cities in the region, such as Ribeirão Preto, Barretos and São José do Rio Preto.

In 1810, King John VI, who had settled in Brazil after the French invasion of Portugal, established the Real Fábrica de Ferro São João do Ipanema, a steel mill on the site where the bandeirante Afonso Sardinha had mined iron more than two centuries earlier in the present-day municipality of Iperó. Foreign technicians, mainly Swedish, were brought in to operate the machinery. Throughout the century, the Fundição Ipanema would manufacture a variety of utensils and products, from parts for agricultural production to cannons for military use.

Coffee was introduced to the province at the beginning of the century. Originally, its cultivation was restricted to the Paraíba Valley, but it gained prominence after Brazil's Independence, quickly making cities such as Bananal, Lorena, Guaratinguetá, Pindamonhangaba and Taubaté rich and creating a rural slave oligarchy. However, coffee growing in the Paraíba Valley began to decline in the middle of the century, due to soil exhaustion and restrictions on the slave trade. At the beginning of the next century, Taubaté remained one of the main producers in São Paulo.

In 1842, the Liberal Revolutions took place in São Paulo and Minas Gerais. The people of São Paulo, dissatisfied with the conservative legislation of the central government and with the removal of Rafael Tobias de Aguiar from office as president of the province, rebelled on May 17, 1842, in Sorocaba, which was declared the provisional capital. Soon, the movement spread to several other villages and cities in the countryside, such as Taubaté, Pindamonhangaba, Silveiras and Lorena, in the Paraíba Valley, and in other important locations such as Itu, Itapetininga, Porto Feliz and Capivari. After two months of fighting, the Paulistas were defeated by the central government on the outskirts of Campinas, in the Battle of Venda Grande, and then dispersed.

Slowly spreading to the west of the province, and competing with sugar cane production, coffee was effectively consolidated in the area of Campinas around the 1850s. Due to the restrictions on the slave trade in operation since at least the 1830s, São Paulo farmers began to encourage the immigration of German, Swiss, French and Portuguese settlers to work on both sugar cane and coffee farms. The pioneer of this partnership regime was Senator Vergueiro, who, in the 1840s, hired hundreds of Portuguese and later German settlers to work on the Ibicaba Farm he owned in Limeira (the farm's headquarters are now in Cordeirópolis). However, immigration continued at a slow pace until the 1870s, with the use of slaves of African origin still the main workforce. In the 1870s, due to the expansion of the railway network, coffee reached the area of Ribeirão Preto, where the favorable climate and soil would favor its cultivation on a large scale. In the 1880s, the increasing difficulty of obtaining slaves, who would be fully freed in 1888, forced farmers to invest considerably in immigration as a source of foreign workforce, resulting in almost 900,000 immigrants entering São Paulo between 1887 and 1900. The interior of São Paulo became one of the world's leading coffee producers.

=== 20th century – Crises, revolutions and industrialization ===
In the first decades of the 20th century, coffee remained the main product of farms in the interior of São Paulo, but other items were also grown on a smaller scale, such as rice in the Paraíba and Ribeira Valleys, or cotton in the Sorocaba region. Mass immigration, still largely subsidized by large farmers, remained strong, but the mistreatment suffered by settlers on farms decreased mainly Italian immigration to the state (the Italian government's Prinetti Decree made it difficult for these immigrants to leave for Brazil), causing an investment in the labor of other southern European workers, such as Spaniards and Portuguese, who registered a significant increase in entry during this period in relation to Italians. From 1908 onwards, Japanese immigrants began to enter São Paulo and Brazil, mainly heading for the west and northwest of São Paulo.

In the first half of the 20th century, the expansion of the railroads through the west and northwest of the state of São Paulo colonized these regions, through the arrival, above all, of European immigrants, of São Paulo descendants of a few generations of these, and of Brazilians coming from Minas Gerais and the Northeast of Brazil.

The World War I made it difficult to export to Brazil products manufactured in Europe, which accelerated the industrialization process of several Brazilian cities, many of them in the interior of São Paulo. Largely because cotton planting was already consolidated in the state, the fabric production factories ended up prevailing in this period, with production in the region of Sorocaba (Sorocaba, Itu, Tatuí, São Roque), Paraíba Valley (Taubaté, Jacareí, São José dos Campos) and Campinas (Campinas, Jundiaí, Americana and Santa Bárbara d'Oeste). Taking advantage of the historical planting of sugarcane, the sugar sector underwent a strong industrial development, mainly in Piracicaba and neighboring municipalities, and also stood out in other regions, such as Sorocaba (Porto Feliz), Paraíba Valley (Lorena), Ribeirão Preto (Sertãozinho).

During the 1920s, some municipalities in the interior of São Paulo exceeded 100,000 inhabitants. Campinas, an important coffee-growing center and already with a significant industrial base, registered 115,602 inhabitants, one fifth of them foreigners. São José do Rio Preto was the most populous municipality in the state after the capital and was ahead of Campinas, with 126,796 inhabitants, 17.67% of whom were immigrants. However, it is important to emphasize that this municipality in the north of the state went, at that time, as far as the Paraná River, on the border with Mato Grosso do Sul, being the largest in size of the entire state.

The crisis of 1929 reduced coffee exports, forcing the government to intervene by buying up part of the stocks and burning the surplus, and leading coffee growers to invest their resources in industry.

During the Constitutionalist Revolution of 1932, the countryside was the main stage of the war that lasted about three months. Some of the martyrs of May 23, when demonstrators were shot at a protest in the capital, were from the interior: Miragaia was from São José dos Campos; Martins, from São Manuel; and Camargo, although born in the capital, was from an important family in the Amparo region. With great popular appeal and volunteerism in all cities of São Paulo, the enlistment had to be contained by having many volunteers for few weapons. There was intense fighting on the borders of São Paulo territory, such as in the North sector (Paraíba Valley region), East/West sector (Campinas, Ribeirão Preto, São José do Rio Preto) and South sector (Itapetininga). Trenches, which still exist today, were dug in several municipalities, especially in the Historic Valley region, the most intense stage of the fighting. The São Paulo railway network was used for troop transportation and the Armored Train. Heroic cases included the farmer Paulo Virgínio, who, in Cunha, preferred death at the hands of federal troops to surrendering his position to the São Paulo soldiers with the words "I die, but São Paulo wins!", or the women who fought in hiding, like Maria Sguassábia, from São João da Boa Vista, initially combating without revealing her identity, or the boy Aldo Chioratto, a young scout from Campinas who was killed while delivering a letter during one of the several aerial bombings that the city suffered between September 15 and 29. Not only Campinas was bombed by airplanes during the conflict, but so were Jundiaí, Pedreira, Itapira, Buri, Cachoeira Paulista, Cunha and São José do Barreiro.

In the 1960s and 1970s, the São Paulo government promoted several works that stimulated the economy of the interior of the state, emptied since the coffee crisis in 1930. The opening and duplication of Via Dutra recovers and industrializes the Paraíba Valley, which is concentrated around the aeronautical industry of São José dos Campos. To the west, the establishment of the Viracopos International Airport, the creation of the State University of Campinas (Unicamp), the opening of highways such as Anhanguera, Bandeirantes and Washington Luís, the implementation of modern production techniques, especially sugar cane and its by-product ethanol fuel, brought progress again to the regions of Campinas, Sorocaba, Araraquara, Ribeirão Preto and Franca.

Until 1970, the industrial sector in the interior of São Paulo accounted for only 25% of production in this sector in the whole state. From this decade onwards, there is an accelerated expansion towards Campinas, São José dos Campos, Taubaté, Jundiaí, São Carlos, Piracicaba, Sorocaba, Amparo, Indaiatuba, Rio Claro, Americana, Araraquara, Santa Bárbara d'Oeste, Sumaré, Pindamonhangaba, Salto, Itu, Botucatu and other cities.

== Demographics ==
According to the 2010 census, the population of the interior of São Paulo was 19,628,510 inhabitants.

=== Ethnicities ===
Color/Race	Total	Percentage
White	13.664.477	69.6%
Brown	4.866.323	24.7%
Black	893.312	4.55%
Yellow	186.817	0.95%
Indigenous	16.659	0.08%

Most of the population of the interior of São Paulo is descended from European immigrants, mainly Italians, who arrived in the state between the end of the 19th century and the beginning of the 20th century to work on the coffee plantations to replace the slaves. In São Carlos, one of the main coffee-growing centers, around 30% of the total population was composed of Italian immigrants, according to a census conducted in 1907. In Ribeirão Preto, another coffee hub, there were 21,765 Italians living in 1902, which corresponded to almost half of the total inhabitants of the municipality. On the eve of the 1920 census, of the 400,000 Italians living in the state of São Paulo, 77% of them were in the countryside. In the current city of Jundiaí, more than 75% of the population is of Italian origin. In Taubaté, the district of Quiririm stands out, where the Italians settled in a colonial nucleus and preserved their customs, with the Italian festival of the district being considered one of the largest in São Paulo. The presence of the Spanish in the interior is also strong, especially in the region of Sorocaba, which has the largest Spanish colony in Brazil, forming more than 20% of the population of the municipality. Another prominent region is São José do Rio Preto, where, in 1920, more than 8,000 Spanish immigrants lived. The Portuguese, present since the colonial period, settled in large numbers in the coffee-producing regions, such as Campinas, Mogi Guaçu, Sorocaba.

The brown category is made up of caboclos, mulattos and zambos. The caboclos, historically known as mamelucos in São Paulo, are the result of the mixture between Europeans and Amerindians. Mamelucos predominated in the population of São Paulo until the mid-18th century, being descendants of the first Portuguese colonizers and the Tupi indigenous women. There was a large addition of indigenous people of Guarani origin brought by force from the missions of Paraguay to work as slaves after the preaching expeditions of the 17th century. It was common practice for settlers to have many illegitimate children with enslaved indigenous women, as was the case of the bandeirante Pedro Vaz de Barros, who had fourteen bastard children with six different native slaves.

The black population is predominantly of Bantu origin, especially Angolans. They were brought in large numbers from the second half of the 18th century as slave workforce on sugar cane and later coffee plantations. During the 19th century, they formed a significant portion of the general population until the mass arrival of European immigrants, amounting to around 20% of the total population in 1872. Currently, the area with the highest percentage is Ribeirão Preto (5.93%), a place of historical predominance of coffee, followed by Piracicaba (5.29%), an important sugar center in the first half of the 19th century. There are at least 64 quilombola communities in the interior of the state. Quilombos are communities formed in former places of refuge of the slave population of African origin. The Ribeira Valley is home to the largest number of quilombola families. Recently, the most prominent black immigration has come from Haiti (a country whose population is predominantly of African descent), with between 2,500 and 4,000 Haitians in Sorocaba and at least 950 in Campinas.

The yellow (Asian) population is predominantly descended from Japanese who arrived in 1908. They are mainly concentrated in the western regions, such as Araçatuba, Presidente Prudente and Marília, but also in the Ribeira Valley, in Registro. Recently, the most prominent Asian immigration is from China. There are around 250 Chinese families in Campinas.

=== Religions ===
In the interior of São Paulo, according to the 2010 census, around 90% of the population declared themselves Christian, predominantly Roman Catholics (64.0%), followed by Evangelicals (24.4%) and Jehovah's Witnesses (1.04%). Spiritists constitute 2.62%. The other religious denominations or beliefs form less than 1% each, with those declaring no religion being 6.22%.

The Catholic Church is strongly linked to the colonization of the interior, since the construction of chapels was one of the signs of the creation of a settlement in the colonial period. The chapel of Saint Bárbara, in the municipality of Araçariguama, was the first to be built in the interior of São Paulo and is still standing, raised in 1605 by the bandeirante Afonso Sardinha. In 1610, another bandeirante, Domingos Fernandes, founded a chapel in honor of Our Lady of the Light, originating the village of Itu (the old chapel was rebuilt in the 18th century and today is the Church of Our Lord Jesus). Born in 1739 in the municipality of Guaratinguetá, in the Paraíba Valley, Frei Galvão was canonized in 2007 by Pope Benedict XVI, becoming the first saint born in Brazil. The Cathedral of Our Lady of Aparecida in Aparecida is the second largest Catholic temple in the world, and the largest in Brazil. Every year, millions of devotees visit the Sanctuary.

Although there have been Protestant individuals since the colonial period, evangelicals only began to be present in a significant way after the immigration of German and Swiss Lutherans from the 19th century, when they began to organize themselves religiously within the coffee farms themselves. With the immigration of Confederates from the southern United States to the Santa Bárbara d'Oeste region after the American Civil War, there is the organization of Presbyterian, Baptist and Methodist communities in the countryside. In Cajati, in the Ribeira Valley, evangelicals form the largest group, ranging from 42% to 60% of the population.

== Economy ==
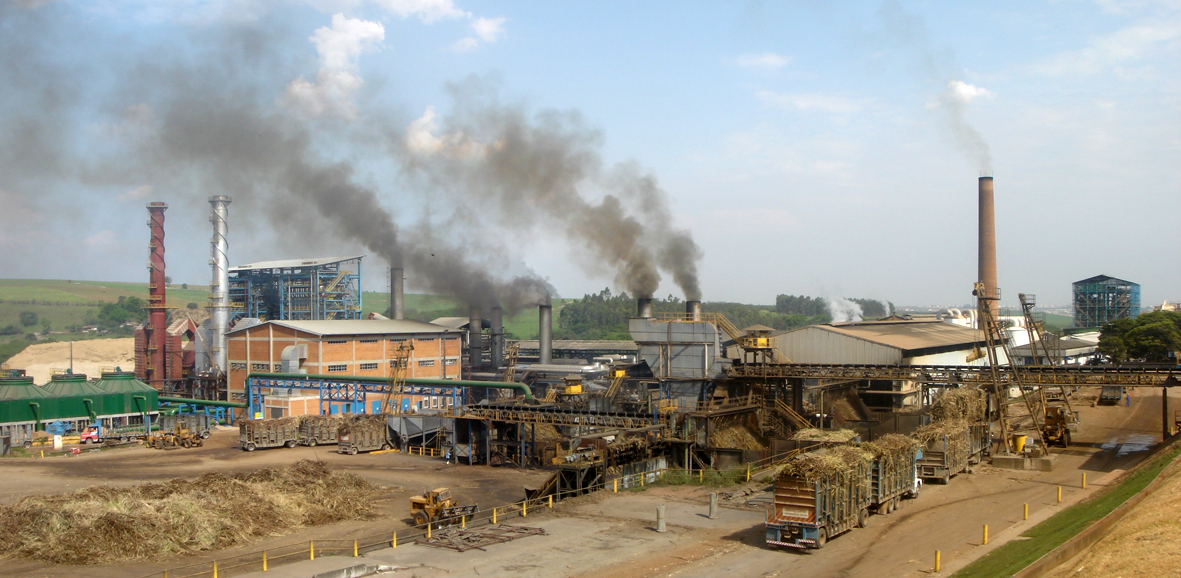
Panoramic view of the Costa Pinto Sugar Mill in Piracicaba, a factory that produces sugar and fuel ethanol as well as other types of alcohol.

With an economic strength greater than that of countries like Chile, the interior of São Paulo has attracted more and more companies from the capital and other states looking for lower costs, space to grow and a logistics system that favors the flow of production, without the chronic congestion of the city of São Paulo. Strengthened by this migration of companies, the Gross domestic product (GDP) of the interior of São Paulo grew by 3.7% in four years. Today, the region already accounts for almost half of the sum of all wealth produced in the state of São Paulo.

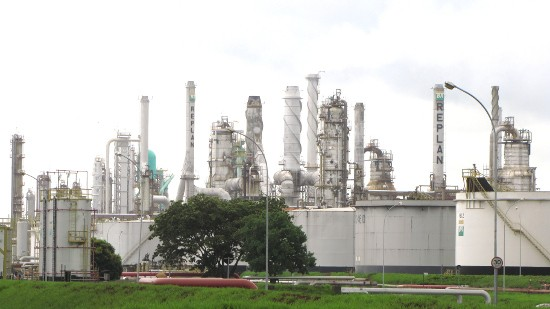
REPLAN, in Paulínia.

These factors make the region an investment hub, which has attracted many companies, mainly to the productive space formed by municipalities in the regions of Campinas, Piracicaba, Jundiaí, Taubaté, São José dos Campos, Sorocaba, Itu and Ribeirão Preto, concentrated within a radius of 150 to 250 kilometers, and focused on the metropolitan region. In addition to the regions near Greater São Paulo, other parts of the interior of the state are also the focus of investments such as the regions of Araçatuba, Araraquara, Bauru, Catanduva, Franca, Presidente Prudente, São Carlos, Marília, São José do Rio Preto and Birigui.

The interior of São Paulo is helping the state to reclaim its position as Brazil's main automotive park, with half of the country's car production once again coming from its territory. The region's economy surpasses several countries, such as New Zealand, Peru and is equivalent to that of Chile; cities in the interior of São Paulo also account for 44% of the wealth produced in São Paulo. In the ranking of the 30 largest municipalities in Brazil in 2008, 11 belonged to São Paulo. Inland municipalities account for about 15% of national GDP, according to data from the Seade Foundation.

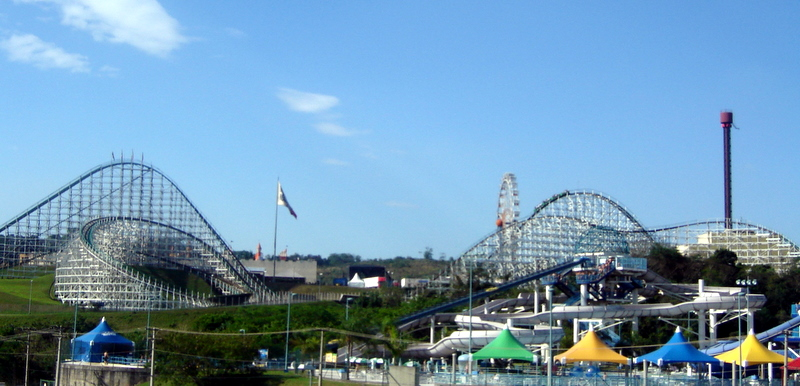
Hopi Hari Park on the banks of Bandeirantes Highway in Vinhedo.

The interior of São Paulo, supported by income from agribusiness and sugar cane, was the region that most expanded spending on food, beverages, hygiene and cleaning products in the first half of 2011 compared to the same period in 2010, ahead of even the most famous consumer markets, such as the Northeast and Central-West. The disbursement with these items grew 14.8% in the interior of São Paulo.

In 2012, the interior of the state of São Paulo overtook Greater São Paulo and won the position of largest consumer market in the country. In the same year, the consumption of the residences of the cities of the interior of São Paulo totaled R $382.3 billion, or 50.2% of the total of the state. Meanwhile, the Metropolitan Region of São Paulo, which includes the capital and 38 municipalities, will operate R$379.1 billion or 49.8% of the total spent on food, housing, transportation, health, clothing and education, reveals a study by IPC Marketing.

This result consolidates the trend of deconcentration of economic growth over the last five years, with state capitals losing their share in the total consumption of Brazilian households. One of the main factors for this expansion are the smaller cities in the interior, which are receiving heavy investments in shopping centers; Sertãozinho, with just over 118 thousand inhabitants, is a clear example of this race, since it will have two shopping centers in the coming years.

=== Technology ===
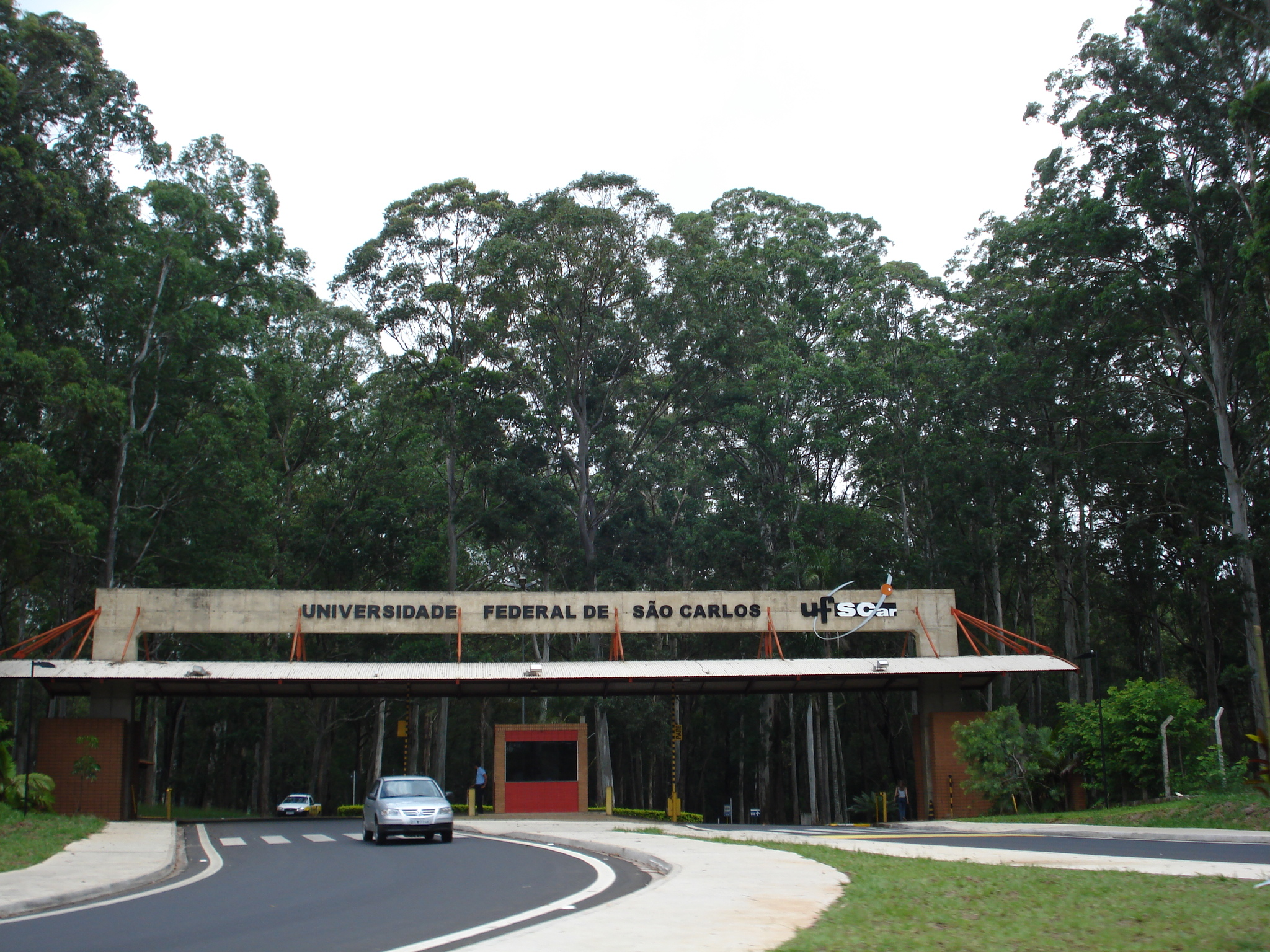
UFSCar, in São Carlos.

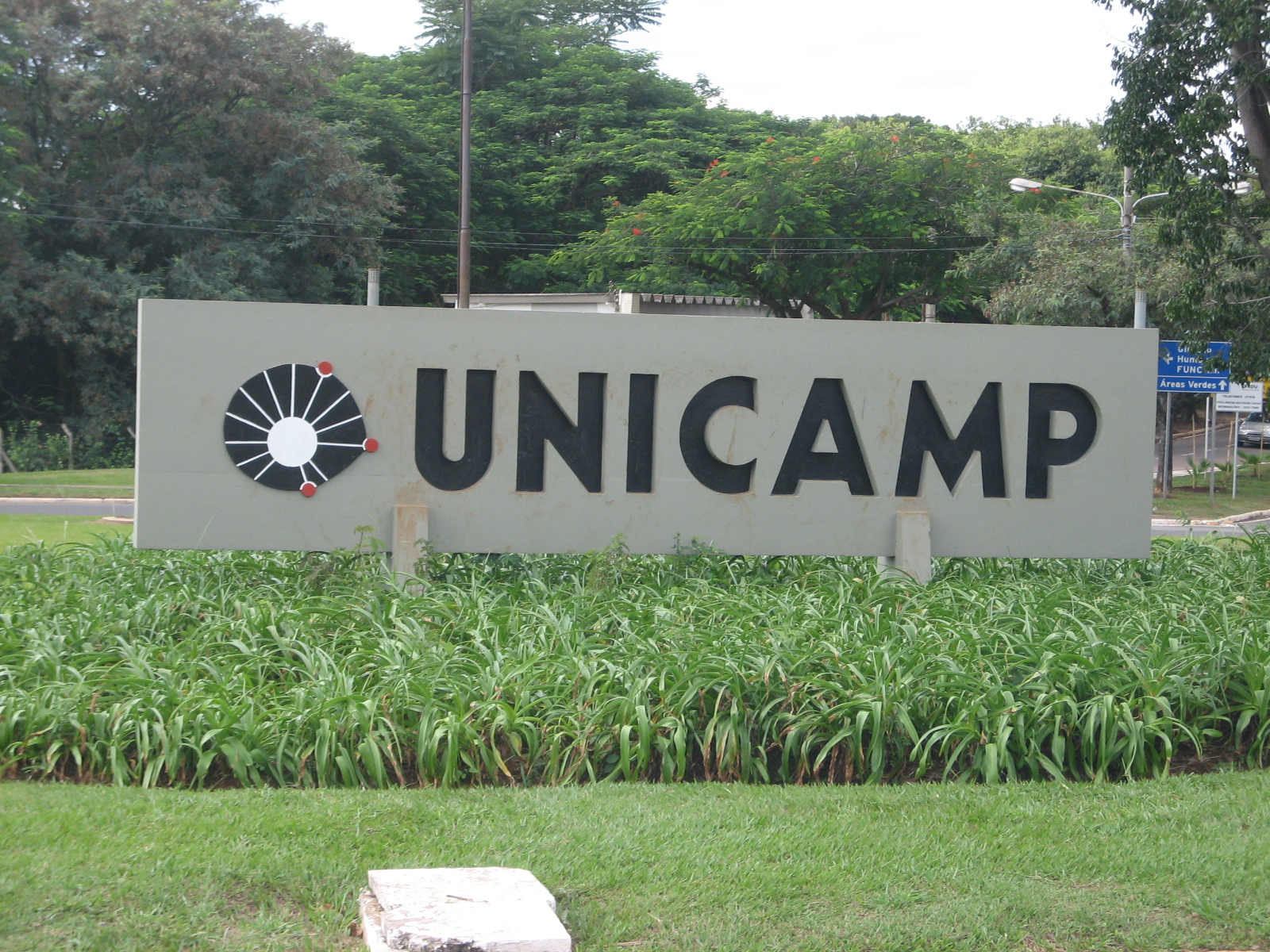
Unicamp, in Campinas.

The interior of São Paulo is one of the main high-tech centers in Brazil, with about a quarter of all national scientific production being produced by this region. The Metropolitan Region of Campinas is known as Brazil's Silicon Valley, in reference to Silicon Valley in California, United States, where several electronic and computer technology industries have settled. This region is home to 32 of the world's top 500 companies in the industry, including Lucent Technologies, IBM, Compaq, Dell and Hewlett-Packard (HP). Other cities in the state are also recognized in this regard, such as São Carlos, Ribeirão Preto and the Paraíba Valley region.

==== Aerospace – Aviation ====
The interior of São Paulo is the great inducer of space and aviation development in Brazil through poles scattered throughout the state, such as São José dos Campos (which has a Technological Park focused exclusively on the sector), Taubaté, Botucatu and Gavião Peixoto. All these cities have Embraer units that will soon begin building, in the city of Gavião Peixoto, the KC-390 freighter, the largest aircraft ever manufactured in Brazil, 12.15 meters high, 35.20 meters long, capable of carrying 20 tons and with a maximum speed of 870 km/h.

Other relevant municipalities that are emerging are Bauru, which has a Volare factory, São Carlos, where one of the largest technological centers of LATAM Brasil is located, and Ribeirão Preto, home of Voepass Linhas Aéreas and where the company's operational and engineering center is located.

== Infrastructure ==
=== Transportation ===
==== Airports ====
Passenger movement at Airports in the interior of São Paulo in 2015
Municipality	Quantity
Campinas (Viracopos)	▲10.324.658
Ribeirão Preto	▲1.109.809
São José do Rio Preto	▼691.559
Presidente Prudente	▼272.204
Bauru	▼143.015
Araçatuba	▼108.993
Marília	▼70.899
São José dos Campos	▼63.622
Sorocaba	▲54.200
Campinas (Amarais)	▲39.753
Bragança Paulista	▼36.624
Jundiaí	▼11.674
Araraquara	▼6.368
Source: DAESP and Infraero

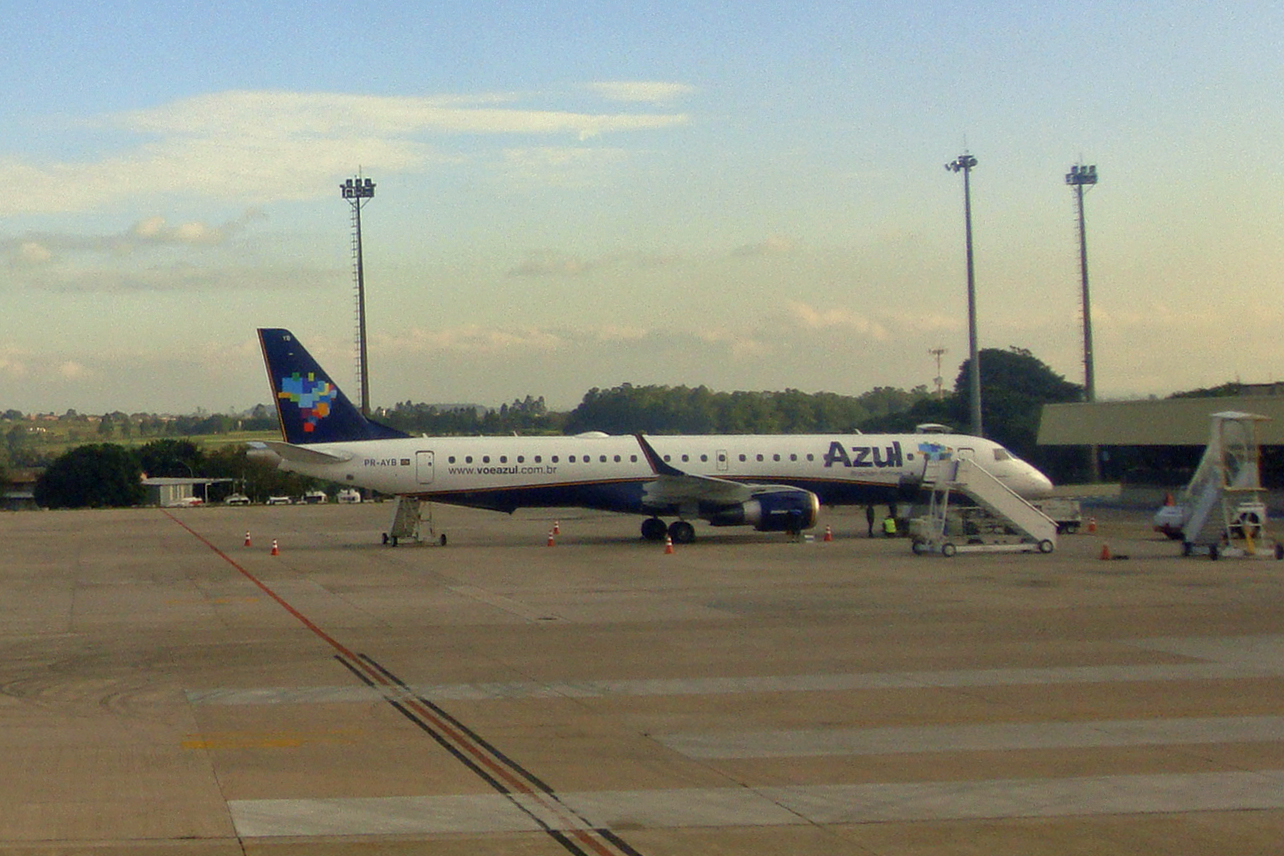
Viracopos International Airport, in Campinas.

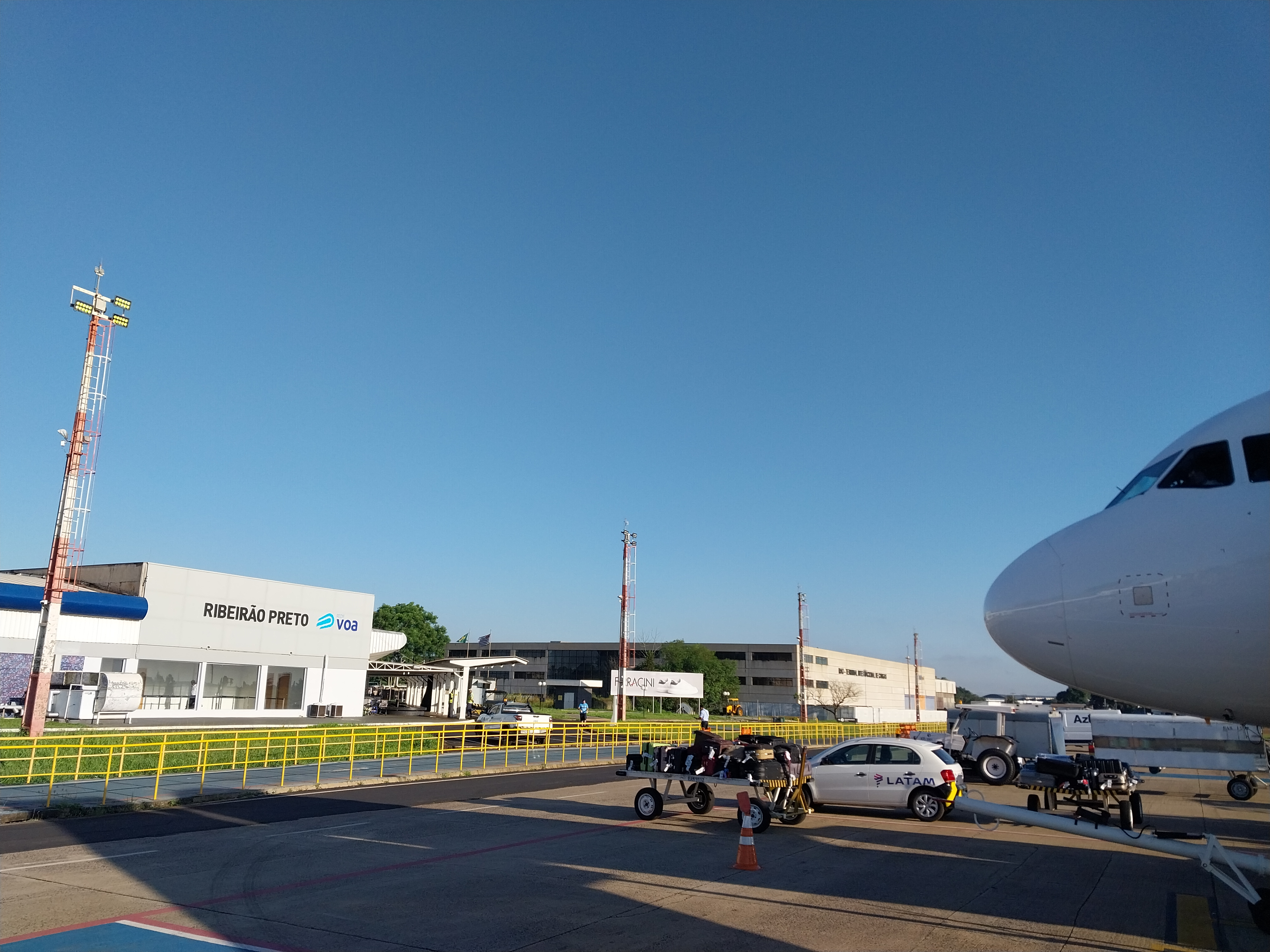
Leite Lopes Airport, in Ribeirão Preto.

The region counts with the Viracopos International Airport in Campinas, one of the largest cargo airports in Latin America and one of the main ones in Brazil. São Paulo also has the Leite Lopes Airport in Ribeirão Preto, which is in the process of becoming an international cargo airport, as well as other regional airports scattered throughout the interior of the state.

Demand at airports in the interior of São Paulo is growing strongly, having expanded by 40% in 2010. Viracopos International Airport was the second fastest growing in the world in 2010, while Leite Lopes Airport in Ribeirão Preto was the fastest growing in Brazil in the first half of 2011.

In 2022, the Legislative Assembly of São Paulo (ALESP) determined the extinction of the Airways Department of São Paulo State (DAESP), a decision published in the Official Gazette on April 15, 2022. DAESP's attributions were transferred to the Secretariat of Logistics and Transportation.

The 22 remaining airports linked to the extinct DAESP were divided into two lots, auctioned by the government of São Paulo and won by the Voa NW/Voa NE consortium, which took the Southeast block for the grant amount of R$14.7 million. The Aeroportos Paulistas consortium won the Northwest block for R$7.6 million. The investments foreseen over the thirty years of the concession in the 22 pieces of equipment were estimated at R$447 million.

==== Waterway ====
In addition to road and air transportation, the interior has the Paraná-Tietê Waterway, which contributes to the flow of cargo and people from the state of São Paulo and the Central-West and Northern regions of Brazil. The waterway comprises the Tietê, Paraná and Piracicaba rivers.

==== Railroads ====
The large railroads in São Paulo spread throughout the interior of the state due to the policy of coffee appreciation in the early 20th century. In 1901, there were a total of 3,471 kilometers of railway lines in the state of São Paulo, reaching a total of 8,622 kilometers in 1940, and stagnating in the subsequent period or even reducing to the present day.

There are ambitious projects, such as the implementation of the High Speed Train linking Campinas to the city of Rio de Janeiro, passing through the city of São Paulo and São José dos Campos, and possibly in the future linking Campinas to Brasília, passing through Ribeirão Preto. There is also the proposal of the Express Train from Jundiaí to the city of São Paulo, the first of the so-called regional trains that the government of São Paulo wants to spread throughout the state.

The state of São Paulo will have a Ferroanel, the engineering project of the 60 km stretch, under the responsibility of MRS Logística. The work, initially budgeted at approximately R$1.2 billion, should be delivered by 2014. The planned route for the line should leave Itaquaquecetuba, in the east of Greater São Paulo, pass through Guarulhos, bordering the Serra da Cantareira, arrive in Perus, in the north of São Paulo, and continue to Jundiaí. This route would mainly facilitate cargo transportation between the Paraíba Valley and the regions of Sorocaba, Campinas and Ribeirão Preto.

The government of the state of São Paulo is considering the creation of fast passenger train lines linking the capital to the interior, starting from cities with a radius of 100 kilometers from the capital. Designs are being designed to take passenger trains at an average speed of 120 km/h, to Piracicaba, a city 164 kilometers from the capital, and to Ribeirão Preto, 336 kilometers from São Paulo; in both cases, the lines will leave Campinas, in the interior of São Paulo. The model defined for the new lines is compact and modern trainsets with a maximum speed of 180 km/h, which ensures an average of 120 km/h.

==== Highways ====
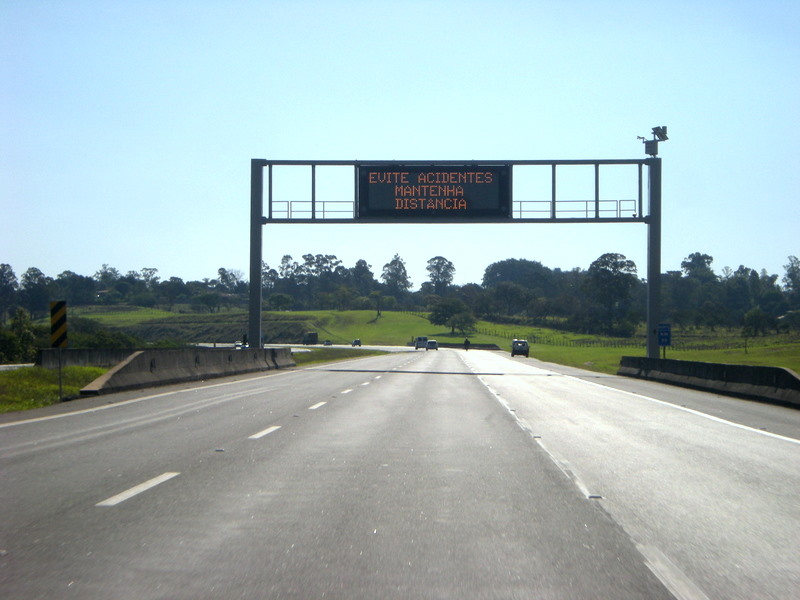
Bandeirantes Highway, considered the best road in Brazil by the National Transportation Confederation.

The road system in the state of São Paulo is the largest in Brazil, covering 34,650 km, which represents 17% of the country's total paved network. It is a huge interconnected system, divided into three levels, municipal (11 600 kilometers), state (22 000 kilometers) and federal (1 050 kilometers); more than 90% of São Paulo's population is within five kilometers of a paved road. The state has the largest number of duplicated roads in Latin America and, according to a survey conducted by the National Transportation Confederation, its road system is the best in Brazil, with 59.4% of its roads classified in the "excellent" category. The survey also pointed out that of the 10 best Brazilian highways, nine are from São Paulo.

The National Transportation Confederation, in a survey conducted in 2006, released a ranking that places São Paulo's highways, compared to others, at the top in terms of general state of conservation. The administration of part of São Paulo's highways was transferred to the private sector in the late 1990s as part of a broader privatization programme. The companies that won the bidding process were obliged to make a series of investments and meet quality targets, but despite the improvement in accident statistics, the collection of a toll considered high by Brazilian standards provokes criticism of the privatization model.

The interior of São Paulo has a complex transportation network, with the main axes being the Anhanguera, Castelo Branco, Raposo Tavares, Dutra, Bandeirantes, Washington Luís, Marechal Rondon, Carvalho Pinto, Dom Pedro I and Faria Lima highways.

The government of the state of São Paulo is building one of the largest road works in the interior of Brazil, the Sumaré-Campinas corridor, which will connect several cities in the Metropolitan Region of Campinas; this project is receiving investments of around R$150 million. In addition, the Euclides da Cunha Highway (SP-320) is undergoing 164.8 kilometers of duplication, with investments of R$775 million by the state government.

The government of the state is also building the largest road complex in Brazil, the Waldo Adalberto da Silveira interchange, one of the main accesses to Ribeirão Preto, located in a strategic area, connecting the Anhanguera, Abrão Assed, Antônio Machado Sant'Anna highways with Castelo Branco Avenue; the investment will cost approximately R$120 million. More than 1.5 million people will benefit from the work. Eight viaducts and 20 access loops will be built in a road complex over 11.8 kilometers long (almost the size of the Rio-Niterói bridge), which is about 13 kilometers long; the project also includes a pedestrian walkway. The new device is designed to withstand vehicle traffic for the next 30 years.

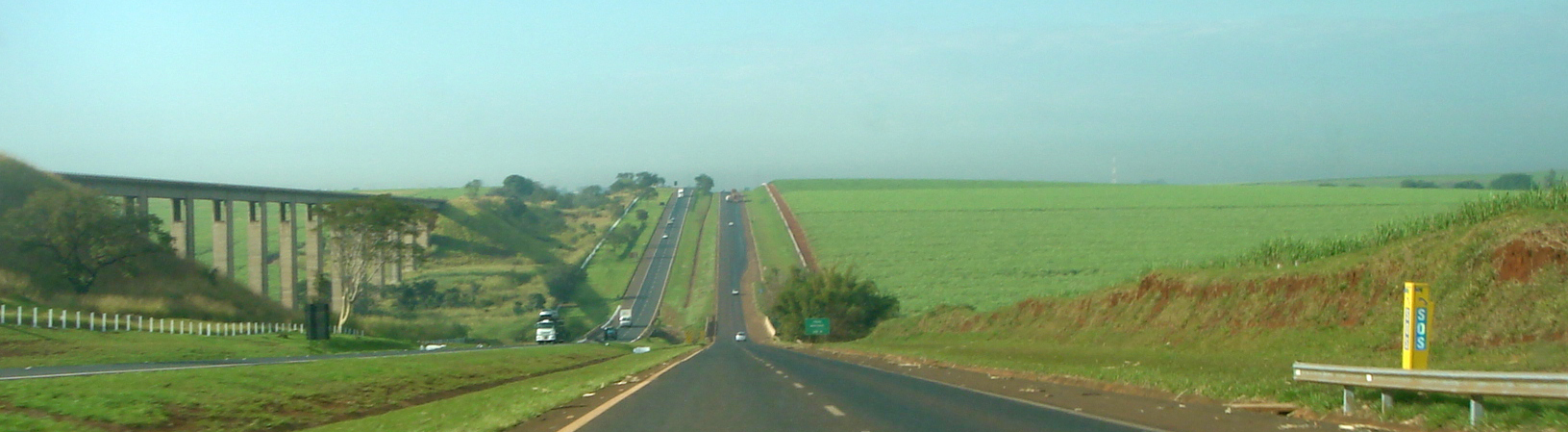
Anhanguera highway in the Ribeirão Preto region, surrounded by sugarcane fields.

== Education ==
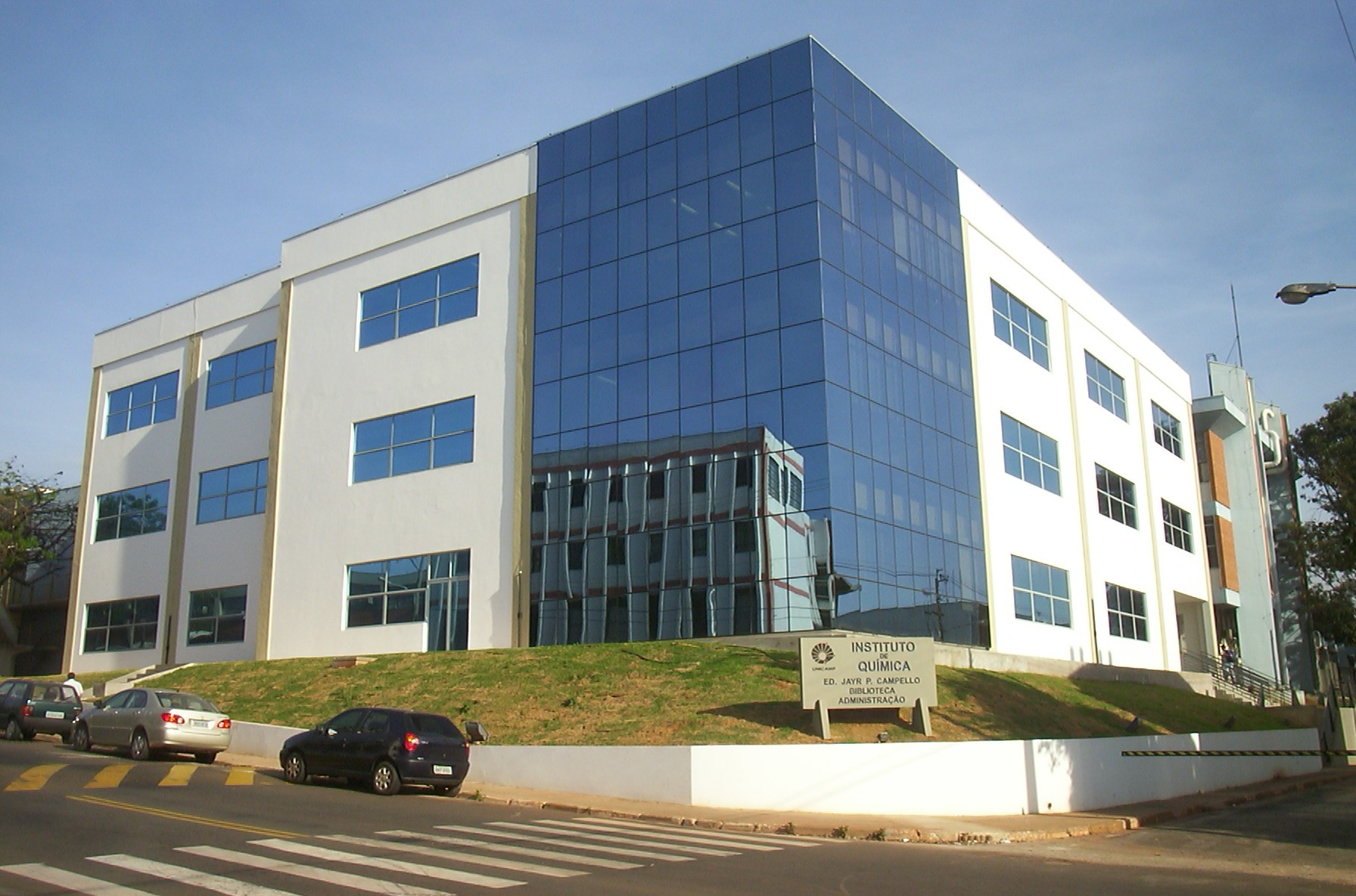
Administration and Library of the Institute of Chemistry of UNICAMP.

The interior of São Paulo is responsible for about 1/4 of all national scientific production. The region has important Brazilian higher education institutions, such as USP in São Carlos, Ribeirão Preto, Piracicaba and Bauru, UNICAMP, UNESP, ITA, UFSCar, UNIFESP, PUC Campinas, and FATEC – the latter present in almost the entire state – among others.

In 2012, the Webometrics Ranking of World Universities ranked the best universities in the world:

- University of São Paulo – the best Brazilian university and the 20st best university in the world;
- São Paulo State University – the 2nd best Brazilian university and the 122nd best in the world.
- State University of Campinas – the 3rd best Brazilian university and the 193rd best in the world;

Among the state technical schools, which stand out for the very high standard of teaching, there are:

- The Paula Souza Center;
- The Technical High School of Campinas, subordinated to UNICAMP;
- The Technical High School of Limeira, subordinate to UNICAMP;
- The Technical High School of Lorena, subordinate to USP;
- The Industrial Technical High School of Bauru, subordinated to UNESP;
- The Industrial Technical High School of Guaratinguetá, subordinated to UNESP;
- The Agricultural Technical High School of Jaboticabal, subordinated to UNESP;

== Culture ==
=== Sports ===
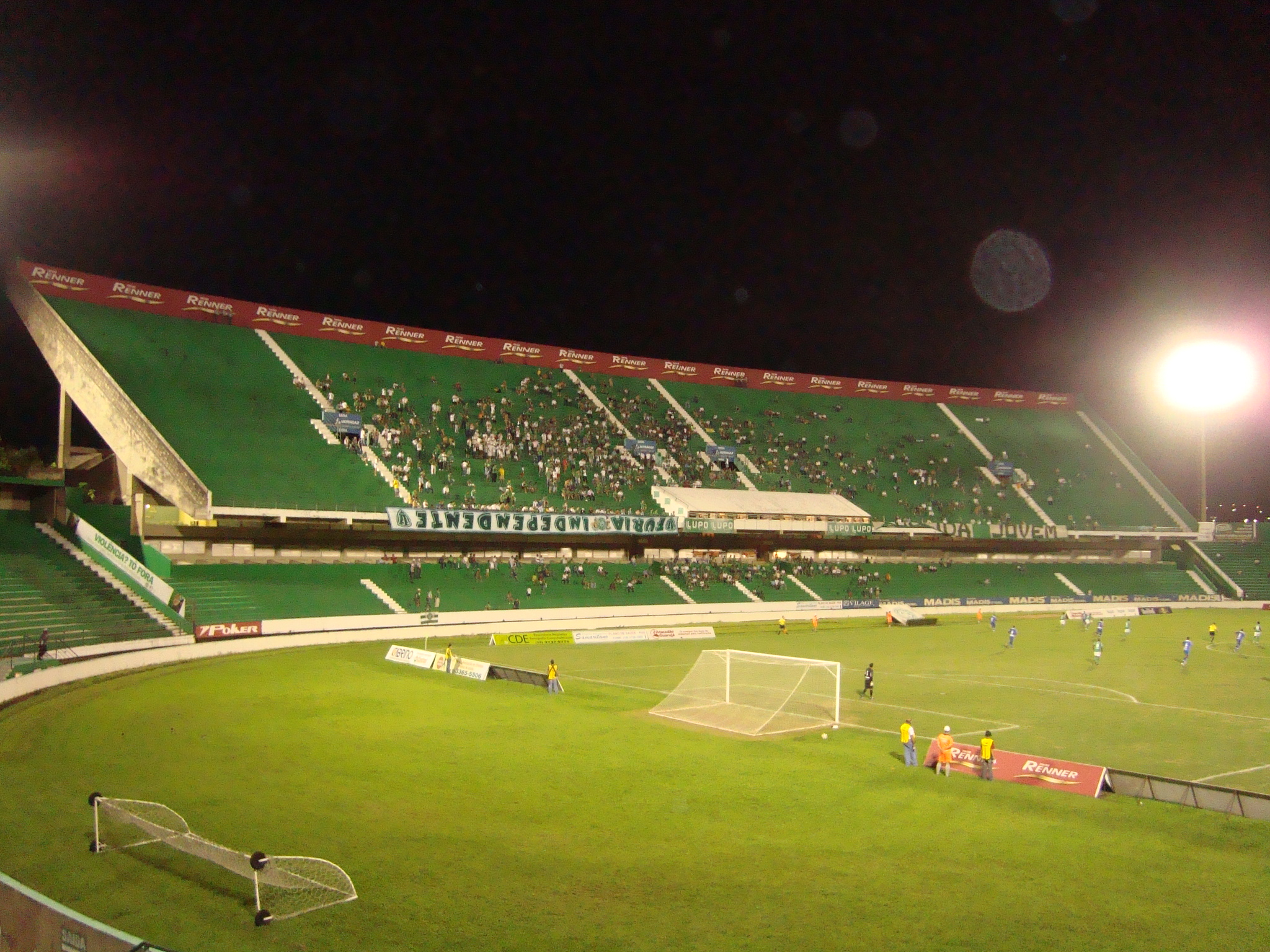
Guarani's Brinco de Ouro Stadium.

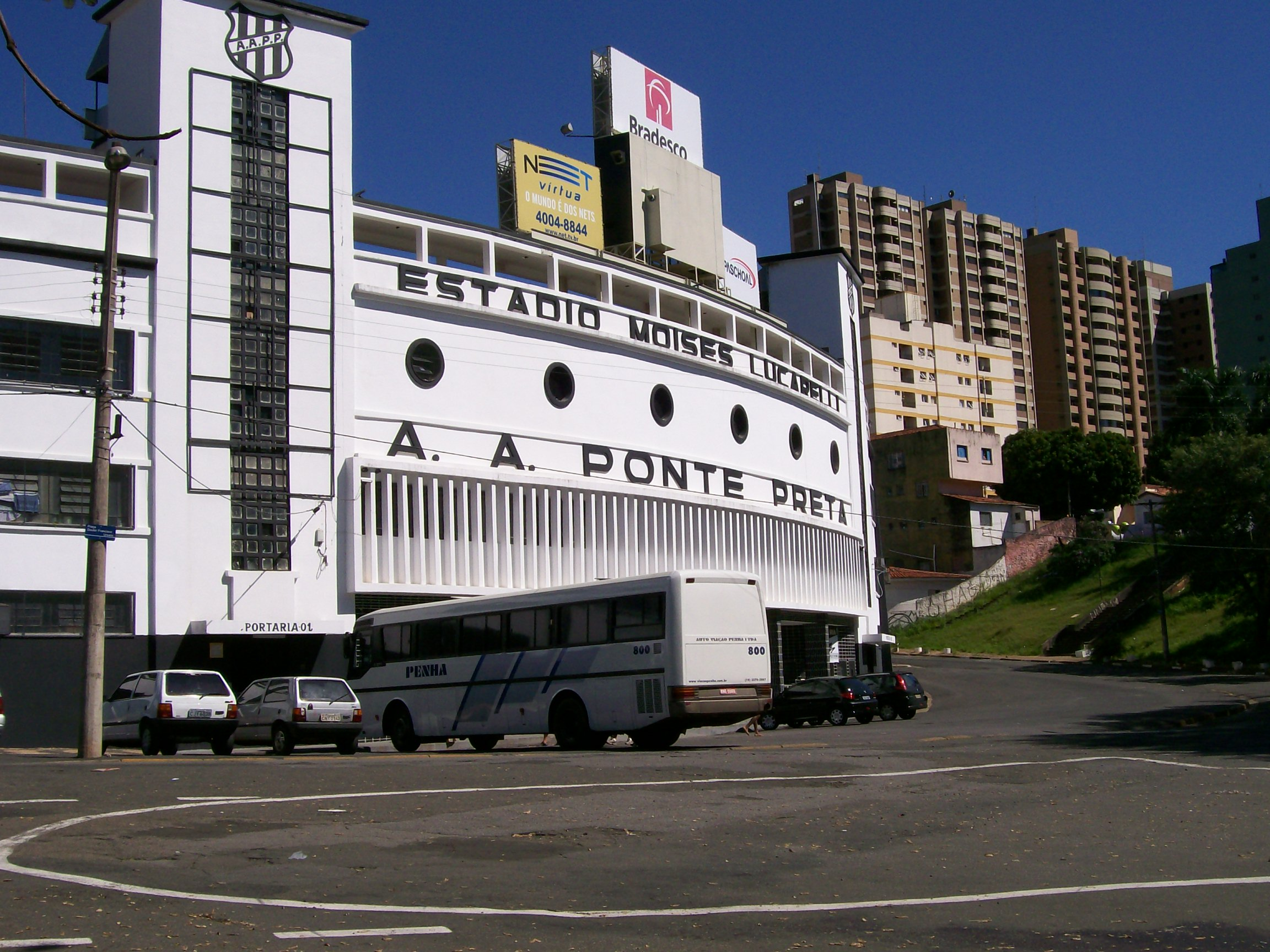
Ponte Preta's Moisés Lucarelli stadium, in Campinas.

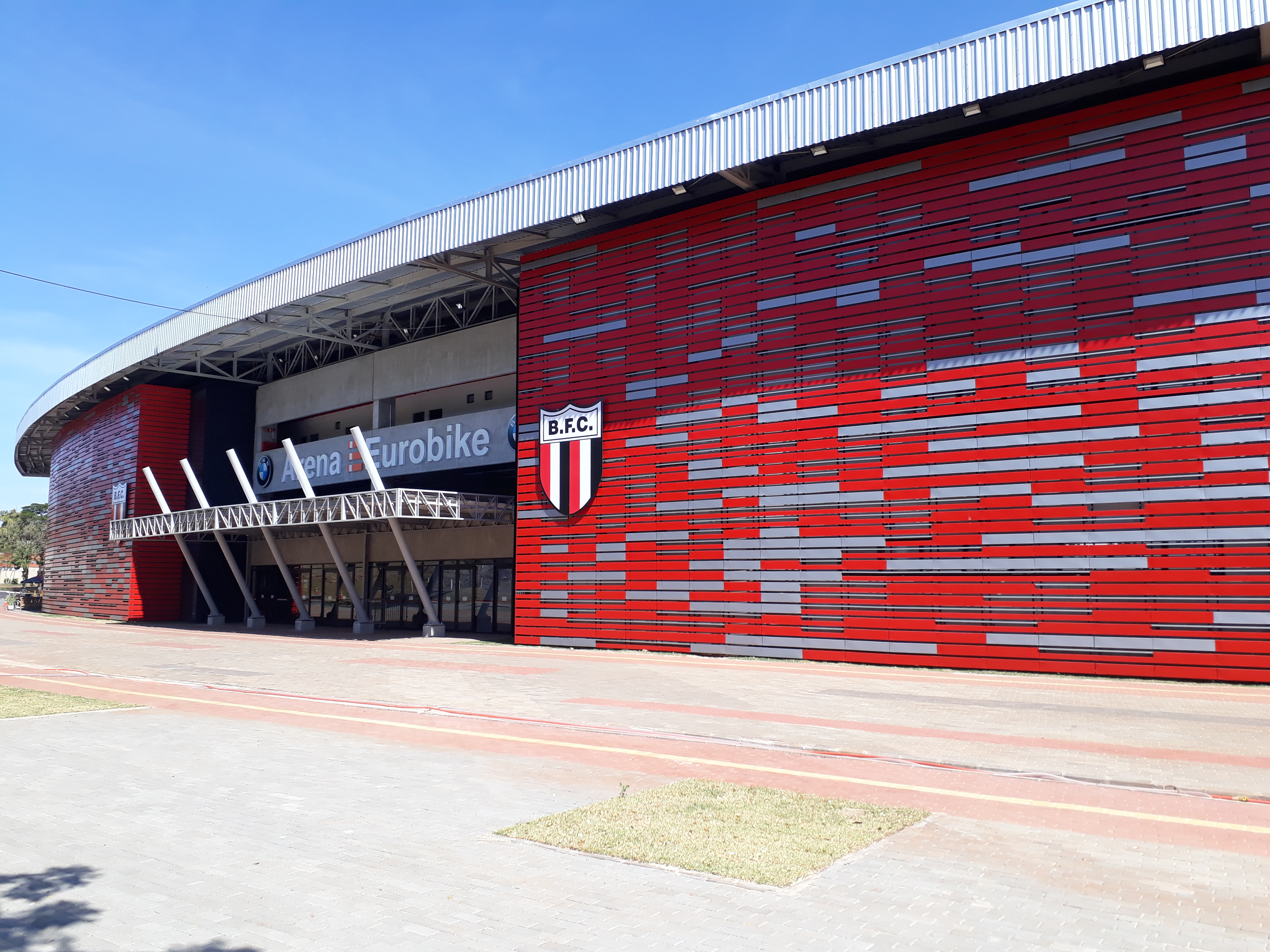
Santa Cruz Stadium, Botafogo of Ribeirão Preto.

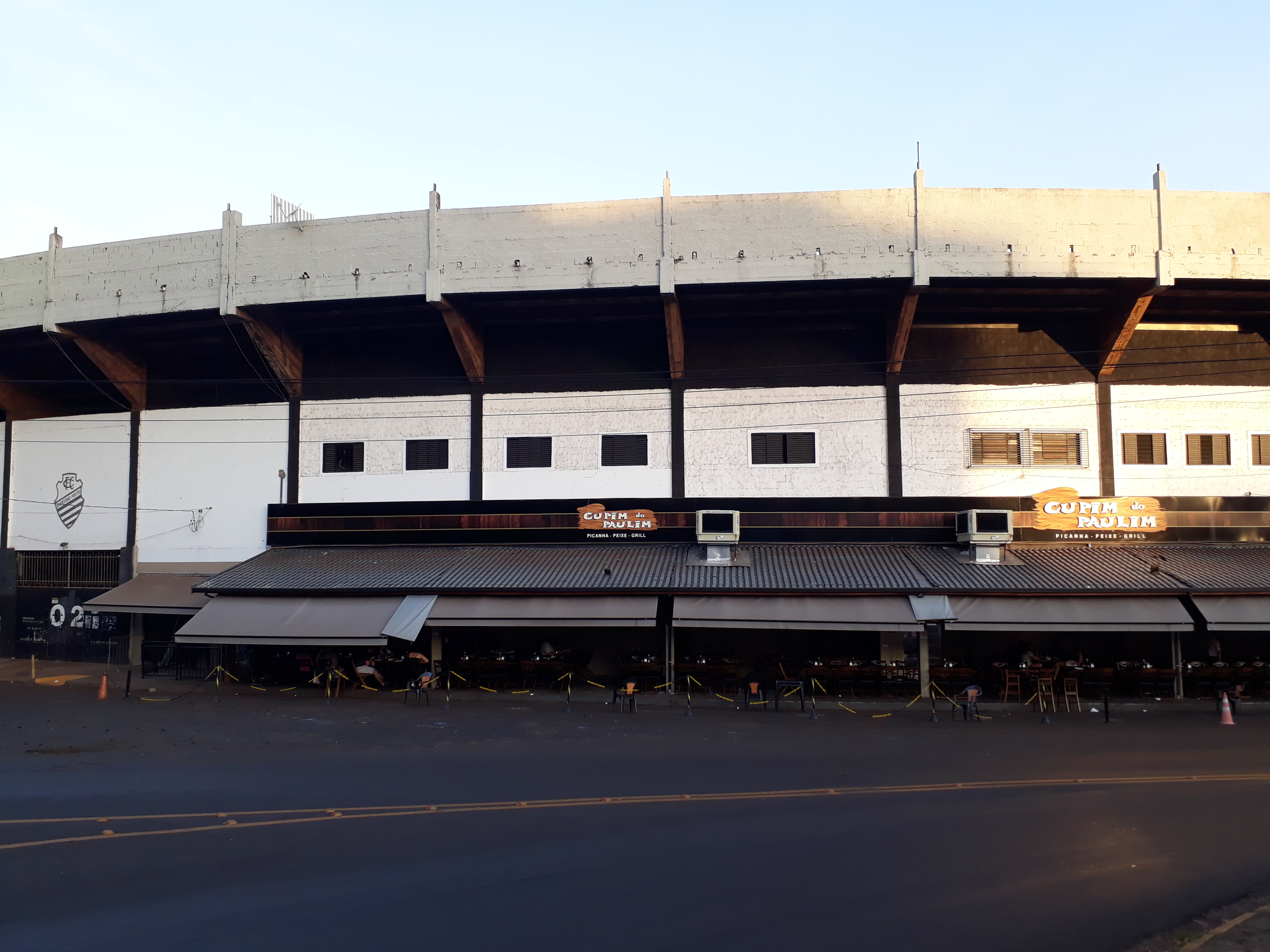
Palma Travassos Stadium, Comercial of Ribeirão Preto.

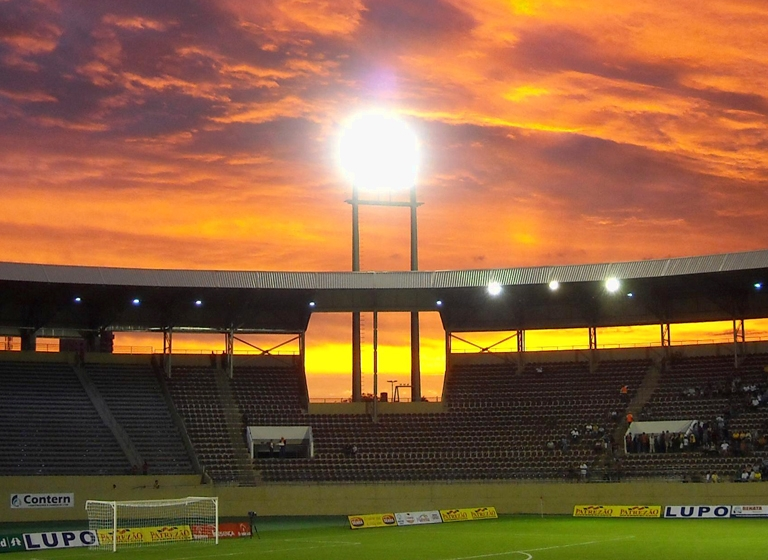
Arena da Fonte Luminosa, Araraquara.

The interior of São Paulo is a promoter for Brazilian sport, having representatives in several modalities that have won titles, medals, and many glories for Brazil. Some sportsmen who ennoble the state of São Paulo and Brazil are: Gustavo Borges, Felipe Massa, Hélio Castroneves, Hortência Marcari, Magic Paula, Abílio Couto, Laís Souza, Emerson Leão, Raí, Antônio de Oliveira Filho, Roberto Carlos da Silva, Fabíola Molina, Fernanda Venturini, Maurício Camargo Lima, Luís Fabiano Clemente, Marcos Roberto Silveira Reis, Nicholas Santos, Maria Zeferina Baldaia and Claudinei Quirino da Silva. At the Beijing Olympics, César Cielo and Maurren Maggi, the only two athletes to win individual gold medals, are from the interior of São Paulo.

==== Soccer ====
The interior of São Paulo has Guarani, the first and only Brazilian soccer champion from the interior of Brazil; Ponte Preta is the oldest soccer club in the state. Inter de Limeira, Bragantino and Ituano won the Paulista Championship. Paulista de Jundiaí and Santo André won the Brazil Cup.

The region still has several clubs of great history and tradition, such as América, Botafogo, Comercial, Ferroviária, Marília, Mogi Mirim, Noroeste, Oeste, São Bento, São José, Taubaté, União São João, XV de Jaú, XV de Piracicaba, among others.

In the countryside, there are some traditional classics, both local and regional, such as:

- Guarani x Ponte Preta
- Taubaté x São José
- Comercial x Botafogo
- Comercial x Ferroviária
- Botafogo x Ferroviária
- América x Rio Preto
- Independente x Internacional
- Paulista de Jundiaí x Ituano
- São Bento x Atlético Sorocaba
- Rio Claro x Velo Clube
- Noroeste x Marília
- Noroeste x XV de Jaú

The main stadiums in the interior of São Paulo are:

- Brinco de Ouro (Campinas) – private
- Moisés Lucarelli (Campinas) – private
- Fonte Luminosa (Araraquara) – public
- Santa Cruz (Ribeirão Preto) – private
- Palma Travassos (Ribeirão Preto) – private
- Martins Pereira (São José dos Campos) – public
- Teixeirão (São José do Rio Preto) – private
- Limeirão (Limeira) – public
- Prudentão (Presidente Prudente) – public
- Lanchão (Franca) – public
- Barão (Piracicaba) – public

==== Rodeos ====
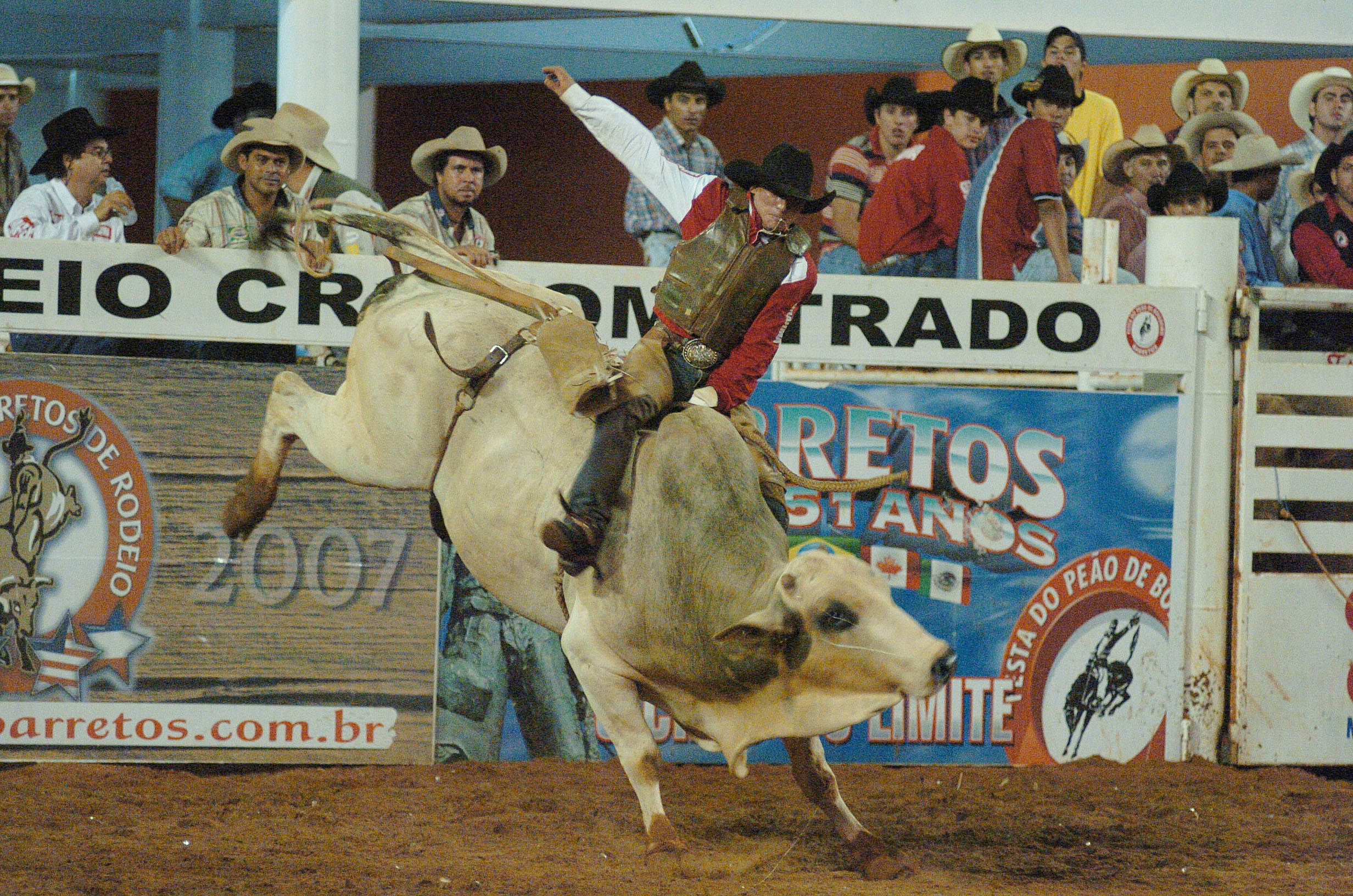
Cowboy Festival of Barretos.

The best rodeos in the country are in the interior of São Paulo, such as the Cowboy Festival of Barretos, Cowboy Festival of São José do Rio Preto, Rodeo of Ribeirão Preto, Cowboy Festival of Piracicaba, among others. In the world of rodeo, Brazil has been standing out more and more in international sports leagues, such as the PBR (Professional Bull Riders) in the United States.

More than 1,000 cowboys from countries such as Brazil, Canada, the United States, Mexico and Australia are part of the PBR. Among these, the Brazilians who stood out were Adriano Moraes, Silvano Alves de Almeida Goes, Renato Nunes Rosa, Kaike Pacheco, among others who each year has been standing out.

== Traditional festivals and events ==
The interior of São Paulo presents several events during the year such as: Cavalcades, Rodeos, Winter festivals in Campos do Jordão, June Festivals, Kermesses, Exhibitions and agricultural fairs, such as Agrishow, held every year in Ribeirão Preto.

== See also ==
- São Paulo macrometropolis
- GASBOL
- Metropolitan Region of Sorocaba
- Paraíba Valley and North Coast metropolitan area
