= Royal Ironworks of St John, Ipanema =

Coordinates: 23°25′32.41″S 47°35′46.38″W

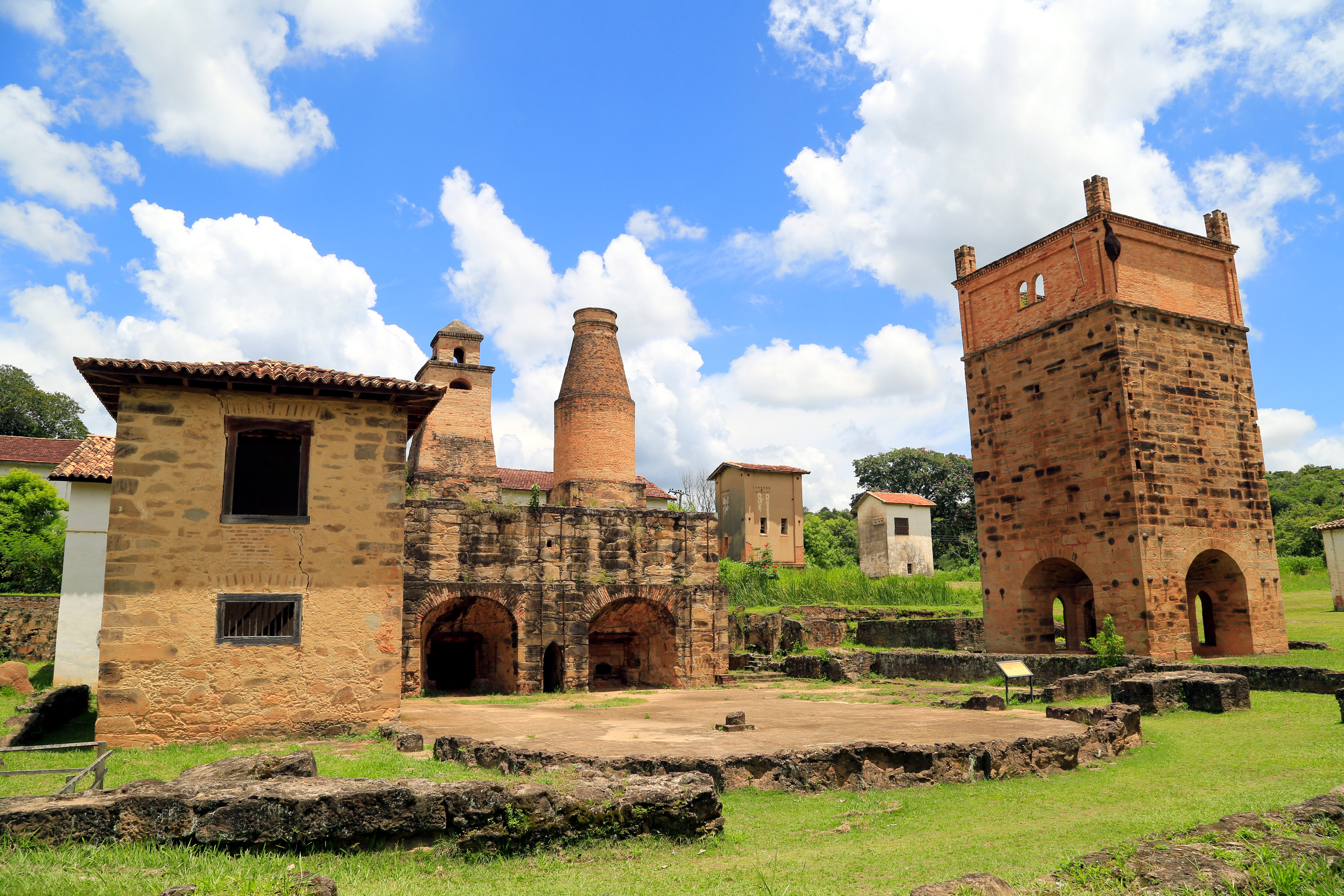
- Native name: Real Fábrica de Ferro São João do Ipanema
- Type: Ironworks
- Founded: 1810
- Defunct: 1926
- Headquarters: Sorocaba region, near Iperó, São Paulo, Brazil
- Key people: Carl Gustav Hedberg, Friedrich Ludwig Wilhelm Varnhagen
- Products: Iron, Pig iron, Ammunition, Iron plates, Pans, Iron rolls, Railings, Bars, Ladders, Lanterns, and more
- Owner: Portuguese Crown (1810-1821), Brazilian Imperial government (1822-1889), Brazilian Army (1865-1889), Private shareholders

The Royal Ironworks of St John, Ipanema (Portuguese: Real Fábrica de Ferro São João do Ipanema, or Fundição Ipanema), was the first ironworks (or foundry) to be continuously operated in Brazil. It is located in Sorocaba region, near the city of Iperó, state of São Paulo. Ruins of the twin blast furnaces are well preserved and nearby is Fazenda Ipanema, a small settlement.

== History ==
=== Background ===
This important industrial enterprise was the result of careful planning by the Portuguese Crown, built and operated from 1810 to 1821, continued by the Brazilian Imperial government from 1822 to 1889, closed in 1895 and reopened in 1917 because of the First World War, to be finally closed in 1926. Thousands of tons of cast iron were produced by its twin blast-furnaces.

The occurrence of magnetic iron ore at the Araçoiaba Hill, was recognized since 1590 by Afonso Sardinha (father and son). There, in what was called Furnas Valley (now Iron Creek, Ribeirão do ferro), they did install a bloomery for making iron by the direct method, in what may be the first attempt of iron manufacturing on American soil. It may have operated for twenty years. Iron samples from that site were subjected to microstructural analysis.

Until the arrival of the Portuguese royal family to Brazil, in 1808, the manufacture of iron was monitored in the Colony, having been allowed only in restricted periods. The venture started by Afonso Sardinha (father and son) worked where the Portuguese Crown allowed; and after them, Domingos Pereira Ferreira did the same.

After the Enlightenment reform of the University of Coimbra, its professor of chemistry Domingos Vandelli encouraged many of his students to study mineralogy and metallurgy. The Portuguese crown sent several of them to travel within Europe. Jose Alvares Maciel was a year and a half in Birmingham, England, and Jose Bonifacio de Andrada e Silva and Manuel Ferreira da Camara toured France, Germany, Italy and Sweden for eight years. Back from his travels, Bonifacio was commissioned to restore the iron factory of d'Alge Foz, Portugal, where he engaged the German metallurgists Frederico Luiz Varnhagen and Wilhelm Ludwig von Eschwege. Manuel Ferreira da Camara and Aguiar Sá Bittencout returned to Brazil with a project to deploy an iron factory in Minas Gerais. On the arrival of the royal family in Brazil, the two Germans were invited to contribute to the implementation of other iron ventures in Brazil.

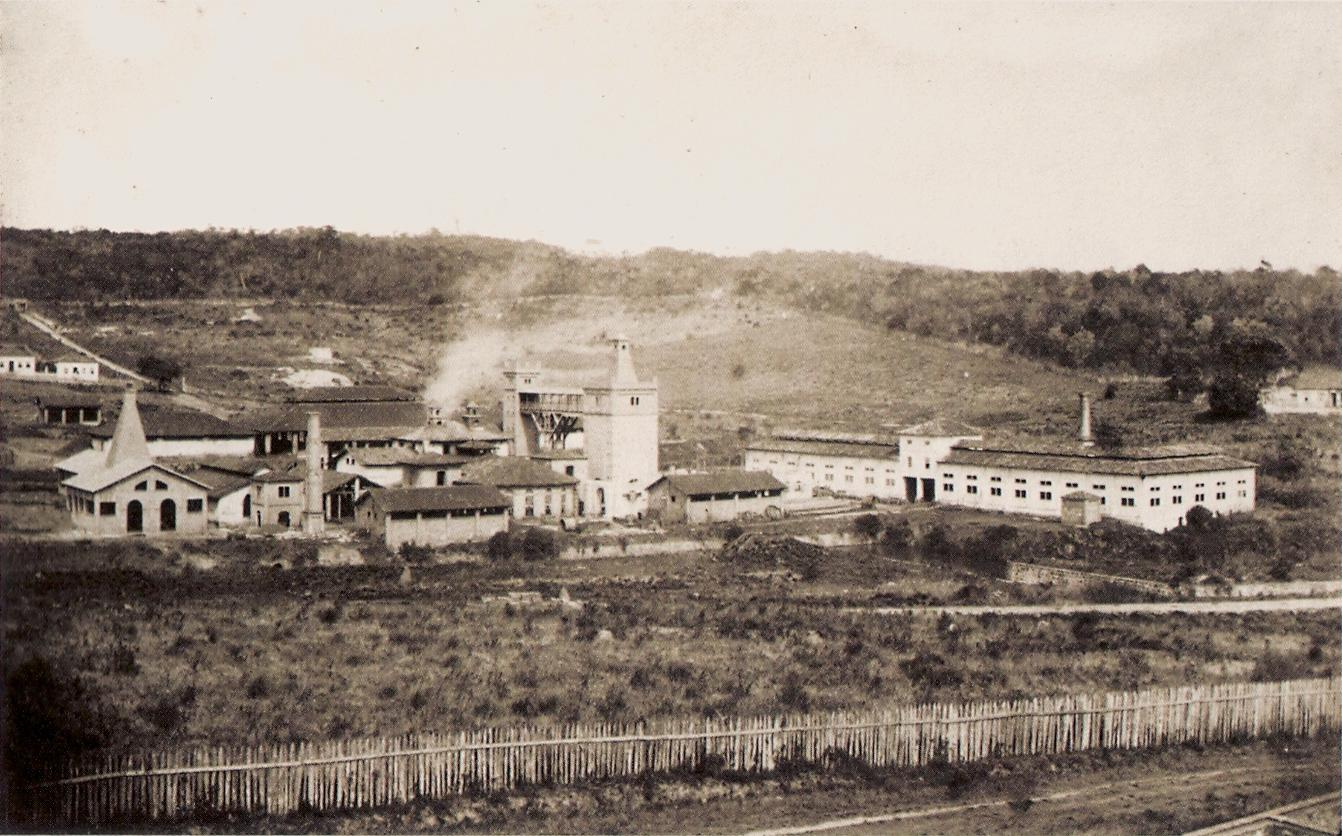
The Royal Ironworks of St John, Ipanema

=== Royal Ironworks of St John, Ipanema ===
D. Rodrigo de Souza Coutinho, minister of D. John VI, instructed Varnhagen and Martim Francisco de Andrada e Silva to design a modern factory to use the iron ore from Araçoiaba. The project was completed in July 1810, including an estimate of the needed investment. The proposal emphasized the need to bring in European experts experienced in technical aspects of ironmaking.

The company was established by a royal charter on December 4, 1810, as a mixed capital shareholder company, with 13 shares belonging to the Portuguese Crown and 47 to private shareholders of São Paulo, Rio de Janeiro and Bahia.

Decisive in the choice of location was the availability of wood to feed the furnaces, and of water to power the air blowing machines and hammers, in proximity to the deposits of magnetite. Thus, the ironmaking activities on the hill of Ipanema are related to the dam built in the waters of the River Ipanema.

Rodrigo S. Coutinho created the District of Ipanema and ordered a team of Swedish technicians, hired in December 1809, and led by Carl Gustav Hedberg. The Swedish team brought books, equipment and tools, but did not start building the blast furnaces as they were expected to do. Instead, they built four smaller furnaces for the direct method. These furnaces have since disappeared, as a much larger building was built later on that site, the so-called Fábrica de Armas Brancas. After he got into disagreement with the managing committee, in 1815, Hedberg was replaced by the German Friedrich Ludwig Wilhelm Varnhagen (father of Francisco Adolfo de Varnhagen), this time clearly commissioned to build the blast furnaces of the factory. Hedberg's foreman, the Swede Lars Hultgren, stayed with Varnhagen and played a great part in building and operating the furnace.

Varnhagen came to Portugal at the invitation of the Portuguese government to direct the Foz de Alge ironworks in 1803. He then traveled to Brazil in 1809, after the royal family and the entire court moved to Rio de Janeiro. The Royal Ironworks of St John was yet another of those consequences of the arrival of the royal family to Brazil in 1808. Varnhagen was successful in the following seven years. He was able to show that the ironworks at Ipanema could be productive and profitable. This ironworks marked the beginning of the production of iron by the indirect method (producing pig iron) in the country. For several periods it produced a ton and a half of iron per day, producing ironplates for kitchen charcoal ovens, pans, ammunition and war material, wire, spades, nails, axes, and sickles.

When the Portuguese king D. João VI decided to go back to Portugal, Varnhagen followed him, in 1821.

Later, the army showed concern and interest towards the national iron industry, so that by mid-nineteenth century, Lieutenant Francisco Carlos da Luz was assigned to coordinate both the technical and the financial aspects of the establishment of such industry.

Under the guidance of Johann Bloem, from the blast furnaces of the Real Fábrica de Ferro de Ipanema came guns and ammunition for use in the Liberal Revolt. It also produced many of the items necessary to Brazil in the nineteenth century such as pans, iron rolls for sugarcane mills, iron railings, bars, ladders, lanterns, etc. Some articles won prizes in national and international fairs, at the time.

The Ironworks was again supported by the Brazilian Imperial Government from 1865 to 1889, under the leadership of Joaquim de Souza Mursa.

During that period, the mine was connected to the ironworks by a 4 km railroad, the old blast furnaces were rebuilt with more capacity, a new iron refining unit was built with technology and technicians from Styria, in Austria, a rolling mill was installed, a mining engineer from Ouro Preto School of Mines was hired to help to run the plant (Mr. Leandro Dupré). They had plans to introduce a new, larger, blast furnace and a Bessemer reactor to produce liquid steel, but the operation was interrupted in 1895 due to insufficient income.

Considered the birthplace of the national steel industry, the Real Fábrica de Ferro de Ipanema retains less than 20% of its original set. Its twin blast furnaces still exist today and are in the custody of ICMBio through the National Forest of Ipanema, in Iperó.

Official documents of the factory are archived, and mostly for free consultation at different institutions: National Archives National Library of Brazil (Rio de Janeiro) and File State Public São Paulo (São Paulo).

== See also ==
- Ipanema Hill
- Francisco Adolfo de Varnhagen
- Sorocaba
- Iperó
- list of preserved historic blast furnaces
