= Francisco Adolfo de Varnhagen, Viscount of Porto Seguro =

Brazilian diplomat and historian

Francisco Adolfo de Varnhagen
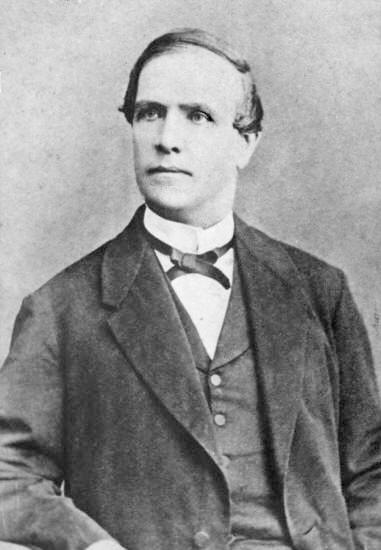
- Born: February 17, 1816; Iperó, Brazil
- Died: June 26, 1878 (aged 62); Vienna, Austria
- Education: Colégio Militar
- Occupations: Military, diplomat, historian
- Spouse: Carmen Ovalle y Vicuña
- Relatives: Friedrich Ludwig Wilhelm Varnhagen
- Writing career
- Notable work: História Geral do Brasil

Francisco Adolfo de Varnhagen, Viscount of Porto Seguro (February 17, 1816 – June 26, 1878), was a Brazilian diplomat and historian. He is the patron of the 39th chair of the Brazilian Academy of Letters. He is considered "the father of modern Brazilian historical scholarship."

== Life ==
Varnhagen was born in 1816, in the city of Iperó, Brazil. He was the son of Maria Flávia de Sá Magalhães and Friedrich Ludwig Wilhelm Varnhagen, a German-born military engineer, who was in service to the Portuguese crown and in Brazil to inspect iron foundries. He received his primary education in Rio de Janeiro. At an early age, he went with his family to Lisbon, where he studied at the Real Colégio Militar da Luz. In the civil war in Portugal, he served those supporting Dom Pedro I. He returned to his studies, where he learned paleography and studied political economy and languages (French, German, English).

His first history work would be Notícia do Brasil, written between 1835 and 1838. His research would lead him to find Pedro Álvares Cabral's long-lost grave at the Igreja da Graça, in Santarém. He was admitted at the Sciences Academy of Lisbon and graduated in military engineering at the Academia Real de Fortificação, Artilharia e Desenho.

He returned to Brazil in 1840, entering at the Brazilian Historic and Geographic Institute in 1841. In 1844 he obtained Brazilian citizenship, and could apply to a diplomatic career. He served in Portugal and Spain, where he was able to utilize the archives in Seville and Simancas for his history of Brazil. He later served in Paraguay, where he found the current regime of Carlos Antonio López odious, but he gathered further materials for his history of Brazil, particularly on the Tupí Indians. He also served in Venezuela, the Republic of New Granada (modern Colombia), Ecuador, Chile (where he met his wife, an aristocratic Chilean lady Doña Carmen Ovalle y Vicuña, marrying her in 1864), Peru and the Netherlands. He published the first volume of his masterpiece, História Geral do Brasil, in 1854. Its second volume was published in 1857.

In 1872, Emperor Pedro II would give him the title of Baron of Porto Seguro, being elevated to Viscount two years later. His final diplomatic service was in Vienna, Austria, where he was serving as a minister when he died in 1878.

His remains were transported to Santiago, Chile, but would be years later removed to a monument erected in honor of him at the city of Sorocaba. Part of his library was acquired by bibliophile José Mindlin.

== Works ==
Varnhagen's work was recognized at the time as a major contribution to historical writing on Brazil, with Alexander von Humboldt, the great Prussia scientist and intellectual, saying that "I will be glad to have [Varnhagen's history of Brazil] in its entirety and to see it reposing in our library." Varnhagen participated in political debate about the importance of Brazil's Indians in the formation of Brazil. He rejected the Indianist school that saw Brazil's Indians as "noble savages" and "a basis for brasilidade (Brazilianness)., In volume two of his História Geral do Brazil, Varnhagen added an appendix that dealt with this issue. "The Indians were not masters of Brazil nor is the name Brazilian applicable to them as savages. Nor could they be civilized without the presence of force, which was not abused as much as stated. and finally they can in no way be taken as our guides in the present or past in sentiments of patriotism or in the representation of nationality." In general, Varnhagen was pro-monarchy, since it gave Brazil a strong central government and took the part of Portuguese colonists in debates about the colonial era. He had a mixed assessment of the Jesuits in Brazil, whom he did credit for contributions. For the thirty-year Dutch occupation of Brazil's northeast, he viewed the episode as lamentable on one hand, but beneficial to Brazil on the other, viewing the Dutch as "a nation more active and industrious" than Brazil at the time.

- Notícia do Brasil (1839). Full title, Reflexões críticas sobre o escripto do século XVI impresso com o título de Noticia do Brasil no Tomo 3 da Collecção de Not. Ultr. Acompanhadas de interssantes notícias bibliográficas e importantes investigações históricas por francisco aldolfo de Varnhagen..... (Lisbon 1839)
- Chelmicki, José Carlos Conrado de; Varnhagen, Francisco Adolfo de (1841). Corografia caboverdiana ou descrição geográfico-histórica da província das Ilhas de Cabo Verde e Guiné (in Portuguese). Lisbon: Typ. de L. C. da Cunha.
- Épicos Brasileiros (1843)
- Amador Bueno (1847)
- Trovas e Cantares de um Códice do Século XVI (1849)
- Florilégio da Poesia Brasileira (1850)
- História Geral do Brasil (1854–1857)
- Sumé (1855)

Preceded by New creation	Baron of Porto Seguro; 1872–1874	Succeeded by None (title abolished)
Preceded by New creation	Viscount of Porto Seguro; 1874–1878	Succeeded by None
Preceded by New creation	Brazilian Academy of Letters – Patron of the 39th chair	Succeeded by Oliveira Lima (founder)
