= Iperó =

- Municipality
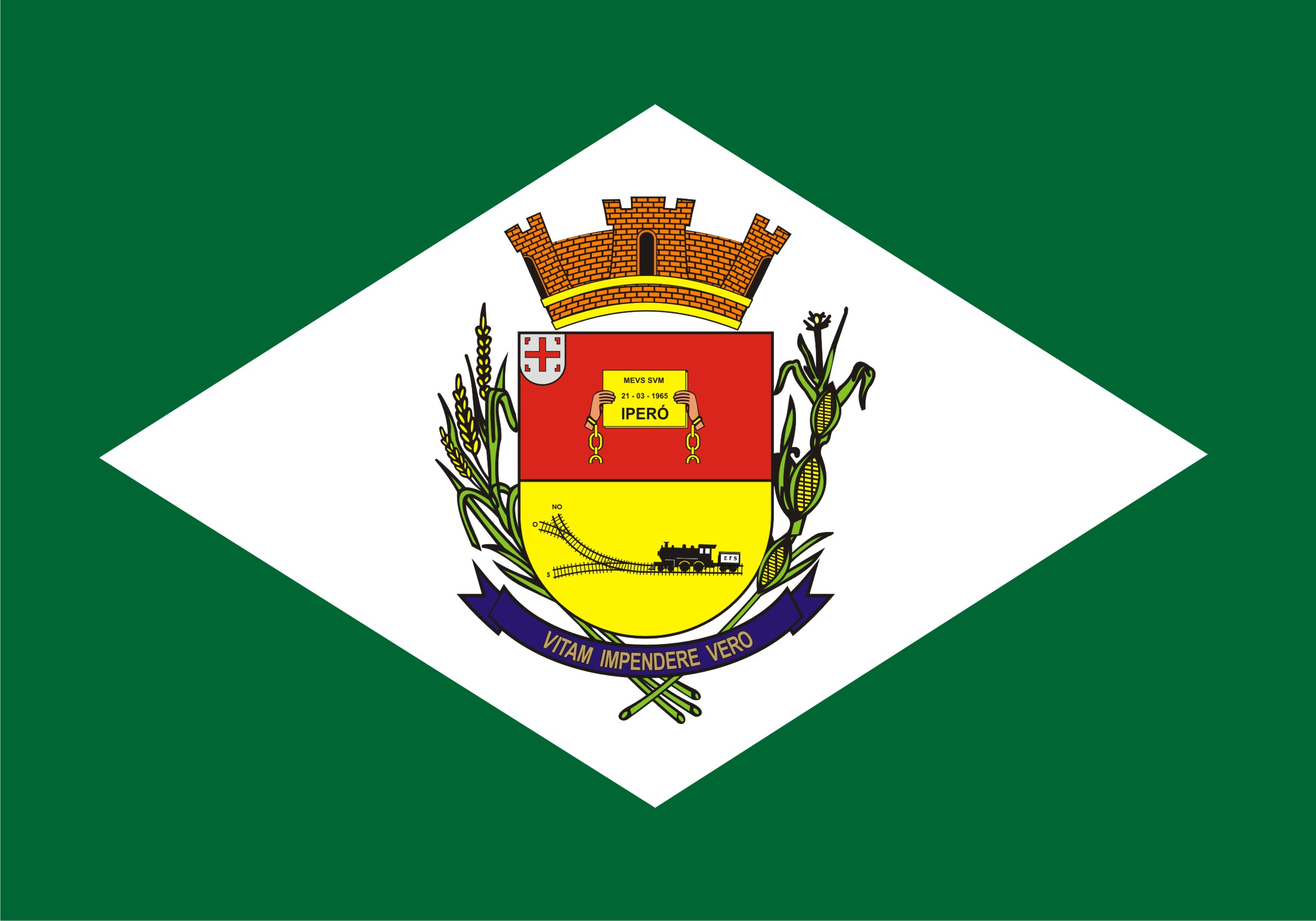
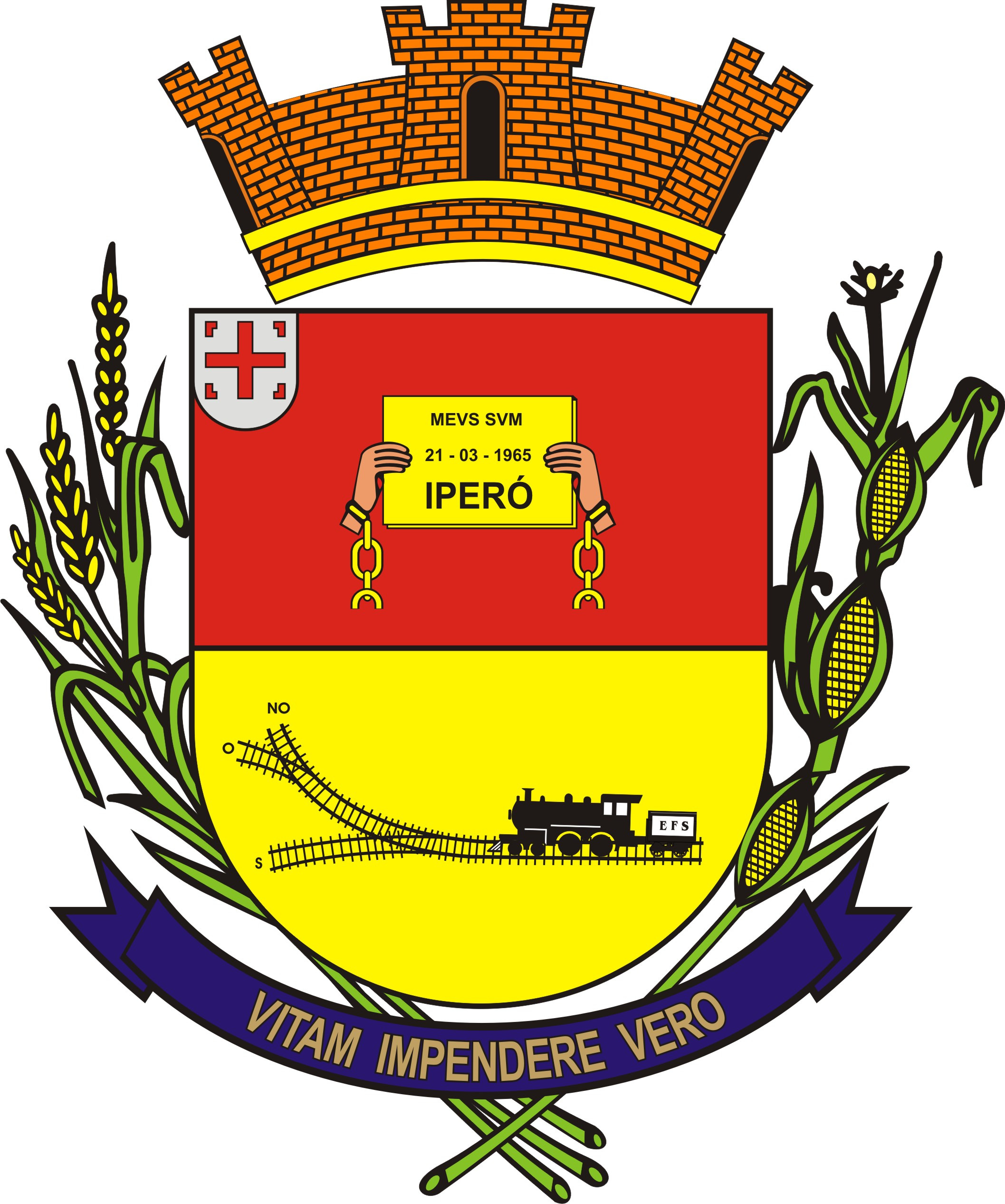
- Flag Coat of arms

- Location in São Paulo state

- Location in Brazil
- Coordinates: 23°21′1″S 47°41′19″W
- Country: Brazil
- Region: Southeast
- State: São Paulo
- Metrop. region: Sorocaba

Area
  - Total: 170.29 km^{2} (65.75 sq mi)
- Elevation: 590 m (1,940 ft)

Population (2020)
  - Total: 37,964
  - Density: 222.94/km^{2} (577.41/sq mi)
- Time zone: UTC−3 (BRT)
- Postal code: 18560
- Area code: +55 15
- Website: www.ipero.sp.gov.br

Iperó is a municipality in the state of São Paulo in Brazil. It is part of the Metropolitan Region of Sorocaba. The population is 37,964 (2020 est.) in an area of 170.29 km^{2} (65.75 sq mi). The elevation is 590 m. The Sorocaba River flows near Iperó. Iperó is accessed with the highway SP-280.

== Population history ==
Historical population
Year	Pop.	±%
2001	18,384	—
2007	24,239	+31.8%
2015	33,367	+37.7%

== Demographics ==
According to the 2000 IBGE Census, the population was 18,384, of which 12,649 are urban and 5,735 are rural. The average life expectancy was 72.42 years. The literacy rate was 91.8%.

== Media ==
In telecommunications, the city was served by Telecomunicações de São Paulo. In July 1998, this company was acquired by Telefónica, which adopted the Vivo brand in 2012. The company is currently an operator of cell phones, fixed lines, internet (fiber optics/4G) and television (satellite and cable).

== See also ==
- List of municipalities in São Paulo
- Interior of São Paulo
