= Rodovia Sen. José Ermírio de Moraes =

Highway in São Paulo, Brazil

SP-075 Rodovia Sen. José Ermírio de Moraes
- Castelinho

Route information
- Maintained by ViaOeste
- Length: 15 km (9.3 mi)

Major junctions
- North end: Rodovia Deputado Archimedes Lammoglia in Itu, SP
- Rodovia Castelo Branco
- South end: Av. Dom Aguirre in Sorocaba, SP

Location
- Country: Brazil
- State: São Paulo

Highway system
- Highways in Brazil; Federal; São Paulo State Highways

The SP-75 (Rodovia Senador José Ermírio de Moraes) is a highway in the state of São Paulo, connecting the municipalities of Sorocaba (Km 0), Itu, Salto, Indaiatuba (Km 50, 53, 55 and 57) and Campinas (Km 77). It is 77.6 km long and receives several names along its route. Currently, 70% of the public of Highway SP-75 are frequent users that use the highway basically to the displacement between their residence and the work. Its toll station is located at the border of the municipalities of Indaiatuba and Campinas, at Km 62, crossing the Alameda Pedro Wolf.

== History ==
The duplication of the SP-075 highway was completed in 1991 by Dersa, which employed the most modern motorway design techniques. Only 1.8 kilometers in the Salto region had a simple stretch until 2010, when the concessionaire Rodovias das Colinas performed the duplication of the stretch.

== Nomenclatures and descriptive report ==
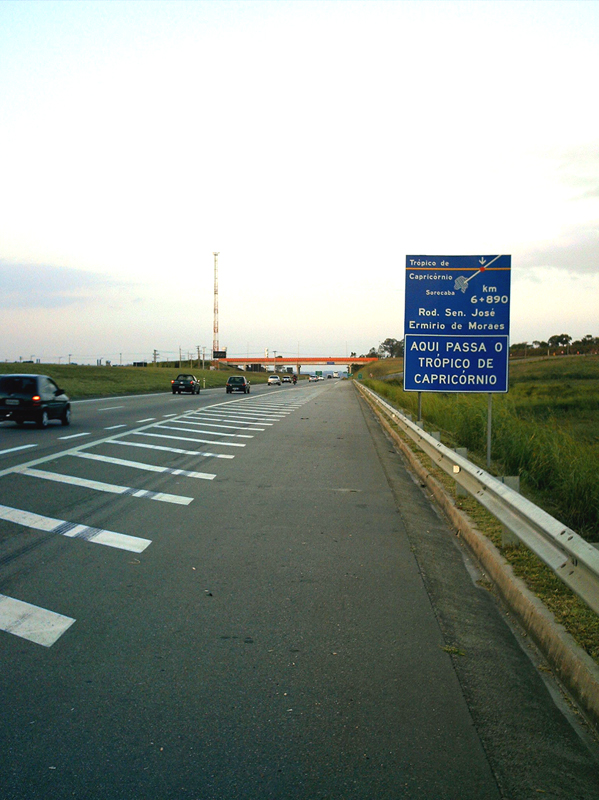
Excerpt from the highway Senador José Ermírio de Moraes (SP-75), near the city of Sorocaba.

The section of the highway that crosses the city of Campinas until the clover of access to the Viracopos International Airport receives the nomenclature of Santos Dumont Highway, being this the main connection of Campinas to the airport. The name of the highway was chosen in honor of the great Brazilian aviator Alberto Santos Dumont who studied in the city of Campinas and is considered the Brazilian father of aviation. Along this stretch, the Industrial District of Campinas is located with important industries of several segments and logistic companies.

In the stretch between the access road to the Viracopos International Airport, in the municipality of Campinas and the Highway SP-79, in the municipality of Salto, it is called the Engenheiro Ermênio de Oliveira Penteado Highway.

The highway called the Mayor Hélio Steffenis Highway is located between the two blocks of access to the SP-79 and the Açúcar highways, both in the municipality of Salto, also known as Contour de Salto, since it was used as a link between the SP-79 and the Sugar Road, before it was incorporated into the SP-75 highway, at the time of its duplication, bypassing the urban perimeter of Salto.

Between the access to the Sugar Road and the access of the Rodovia Castelo Branco, already in the city of Itu, receives the name of Rodovia Deputy Archimedes Lammoglia.

In the section between the municipalities of Sorocaba and Itu, in its initial stretch, its denomination is Rodovia Senator José Ermírio de Moraes. This stretch is also nicknamed "Castelinho" because of its resemblance to the Rodovia Castelo Branco.

The SP-75 starts in the access with Avenida Dom Aguirre, on the banks of the Sorocaba River in the homonymous city.
