= 2026 Ituano FC season =

Ituano FC
2026 season
- Manager: Mazola Júnior
- Stadium: Estádio Novelli Júnior
- Campeonato Brasileiro Série C: 5th
- Campeonato Paulista Série A2: Semi-finals
- Top goalscorer: League: All: Neto Berola (7)

The 2026 season is the 79th year in the history of Ituano Futebol Clube and its second consecutive season in the Campeonato Brasileiro Série C. In addition, the club participates in the Campeonato Paulista Série A2.

== Transfers ==
=== In ===
Pos.	Player	Transferred from	Fee	Date	Source
FW	(Brazil) Bruno Mezenga	(Brazil) Náutico		1 January 2026	
MF	(Brazil) Nelsinho	(Brazil) Primavera		1 January 2026	
MF	(Brazil) Xavier	(Brazil) Amazonas		1 January 2026	

== Competitions ==
=== Campeonato Brasileiro Série C ===
Pos	Team	Pld	W	D	L	GF	GA	GD	Pts
13	Maranhão	17	6	6	5	14	15	−1	24
14	Figueirense	17	6	6	5	17	21	−4	24
15	Ituano	17	6	4	7	18	18	0	22
16	Volta Redonda	17	6	3	8	12	21	−9	21
17	Barra	17	4	6	7	18	19	−1	18

Updated to match(es) played on 17 August 2026. Source: CBF
Rules for classification: 1) points; 2) wins; 3) goal difference; 4) goals scored; 5) fewest red cards; 6) fewest yellow cards; 7) draw.

==== Results by round ====
Round	1	2	3	4	5	6	7	8
Ground	H	A	A	H	A	H	A	H
Result	W	L	D	W	L	W	W	W
Position								

Updated to match(es) played on 25 May 2026. Source:
A = Away; H = Home; W = Win; D = Draw; L = Loss

==== Matches ====
5 April 2026 1	Ituano	2–0	Anápolis	Itu
17:00				Stadium: Estádio Novelli Júnior

12 April 2026 2	Amazonas	3–0	Ituano	Manaus

18 April 2026 3	Inter de Limeira	1–1	Ituano	Limeira
17:00				Stadium: Estádio Major José Levy Sobrinho; Referee: Emerson Souza Silva

26 April 2026 4	Ituano	4–1	Maringá	Itu
19:00				Stadium: Estádio Novelli Júnior; Referee: Paulo Belence Alves dos Prazeres Filho

5 May 2026 5	Ypiranga	2–0	Ituano	Erechim
15:00				Stadium: Estádio Olímpico Colosso da Lagoa; Referee: Jodis Nascimento de Souza

10 May 2026 6	Ituano	1–0	Confiança	Itu
19:30	Thassio 29'			Stadium: Estádio Novelli Júnior; Referee: Wanbelton Lisboa Valente

17 May 2026 7	Guarani	1–3	Ituano	Campinas
18:30				Stadium: Estádio Brinco de Ouro; Referee: Artur de Morais Fernandes

25 May 2026 8	Ituano	1–0	Botafogo-PB	Itu
20:00	Xavier 47'			Stadium: Estádio Novelli Júnior; Referee: Leonardo Willers Lorenzatto

30 May 2026 9	Caxias	2–1	Ituano
19:30

14 June 2026 10	Itabaiana	2–2	Ituano
16:30

21 June 2026 11	Ituano	0–0	Figueirense	Itu
20:30				Stadium: Estádio Novelli Júnior

28 June 2026 12	Ituano	0–0	Maranhão	Itu
20:30				Stadium: Estádio Novelli Júnior

4 July 2026 13	Santa Cruz	1–0	Ituano
19:30

12 July 2026 14	Ituano	1–3	Ferroviária	Itu
16:00				Stadium: Estádio Novelli Júnior

26 July 2026 15	Brusque	1–0	Ituano
16:00

8 August 2026 16	Ituano	2–0	Barra	Itu
19:30				Stadium: Estádio Novelli Júnior

15 August 2026 17	Volta Redonda	1–0	Ituano
17:00

22 August 2026 18	Ituano	v	Paysandu	Itu
17:00				Stadium: Estádio Novelli Júnior

=== Campeonato Paulista Série A2 ===
10 January 2026	Grêmio Prudente	1–1	Ituano
18:00

14 January 2026	Ituano	1–0	Votuporanguense
18:30

17 January 2026	Ituano	1–1	Ferroviária
18:00

21 January 2026	Linense	1–3	Ituano
19:30

25 January 2026	Ituano	2–1	São Bento
18:00

28 January 2026	Juventus	1–1	Ituano
15:00

1 February 2026	Taubaté	0–1	Ituano
15:00

8 February 2026	Ituano	1–0	Santo André
10:00

11 February 2026	Ituano	2–1	Inter de Limeira
19:00

14 February 2026	XV de Piracicaba	0–1	Ituano
18:00

18 February 2026	Ituano	0–1	Água Santa
19:00

21 February 2026	Ituano	4–0	Sertãozinho
18:00

25 February 2026	São José	2–1	Ituano
20:00

1 March 2026	Osasco	2–0	Ituano
10:00

7 March 2026	Ituano	3–3	Monte Azul
15:00

==== Championship round ====
14 March 2026 1	Votuporanguense	3–0	Ituano
18:00

18 March 2026 2	Ituano	0–0	XV de Piracicaba
19:00

25 March 2026 3	Ituano	3–0	Água Santa
18:00

28 March 2026 4	Água Santa	1–2	Ituano
15:00

8 April 2026 5	XV de Piracicaba	3–0	Ituano
21:00

15 April 2026 6	Ituano	2–1	Votuporanguense
19:00

==== Semi-finals ====
23 April 2026 First leg	Ituano	0–1	Ferroviária
19:00

30 April 2026 Second leg	Ferroviária	1–1 (2–1 agg.)	Ituano
19:00
