= São Francisco Ridge =

Brazil mountain

Coordinates: 23°36′S 47°23′W

The São Francisco Range (Portuguese: Serra de São Francisco) is a topographic elevation in the Brazilian Highlands, situated in the south of the cities of Votorantim and Sorocaba, state of São Paulo, Brazil.

== History ==
The origin of the name dates from the founding of Sorocaba 1654 by Baltasar Fernandes and as the aim was to transform the local village, built a chapel dedicated to Nossa Senhora da Ponte. Esteves Brás Leme stood near the mouth of the Sarapuí River and his son-Pascoal Moreira Cabral Leme in place that would be called Serra de São Francisco (Votorantim). Braz Tevês and Pascoal Moreira Cabral Leme built their big house in Itapeva starting the planting of sugar cane and the consequent use of milling. The farm, which was named São Francisco.

== Tourism and leisure ==
In the higher parts of the mountain there is the Penha Chapel, rebuilt in 1724 by Tim de Oliveira, still exists today in the hills. It is a landmark of the region and has been held annually for Votorantim pilgrimage to the site.

== See also ==
- Itupararanga Dam – Dam in São Paulo, Brazil
- Sorocaba
- Votorantim
