= Itupararanga Dam =

Dam in São Paulo, Brazil

- Location within Brazil
- Country: Brazil
- Coordinates: 23°36′43.35″S 47°23′49.87″W
- Construction began: 1913
- Opening date: 1914

Dam and spillways
- Impounds: Sorocaba River
- Height: 38 m (125 ft)
- Length: 415 m (1,362 ft)

Reservoir
- Total capacity: 286×10^{6} m^{3} (232,000 acre⋅ft)

Power Station
- Commission date: 26 May 1914
- Turbines: 4
- Installed capacity: 55 MW (74,000 hp)

The Itupararanga Dam is a dam, located on the Sorocaba River in the Sorocaba region of São Paulo state. It was built by Light S.A. from 1913 to 1914. The plant started its operation on 25 March 1914. It forms a lake with more than 40 kilometres (25 mi) and an area of 936 square kilometers with the main channel of 26 kilometres (16 mi) and 192 kilometres (119 mi) from shore. The estimated volume is 286 million cubic metres (232,000 acre⋅ft). The plant, with an installed capacity of 55 MW (74,000 hp) and average annual production of 150 gigawatt-hours (540 TJ), is used only by the industrial Votorantim Group, as Votorantim Cement Factory in St. Helena and the Companhia Brasileira de Alumínio – CBA, in Alumínio.

The dam is 415 metres (1,362 ft) in length and has a height of 38 metres (125 ft). It was built over the Sorocaba River canyon in the São Francisco Ridge. The water reservoir supplies Ibiúna 100%, Sorocaba 74%, Votorantim 92% and São Roque 32% and other neighboring cities. It is used to irrigate hundreds of farms in the vicinity. It is a leading tourist attraction in the region.
