= Sorocaba =

- Municipality
- Municipality of Sorocaba
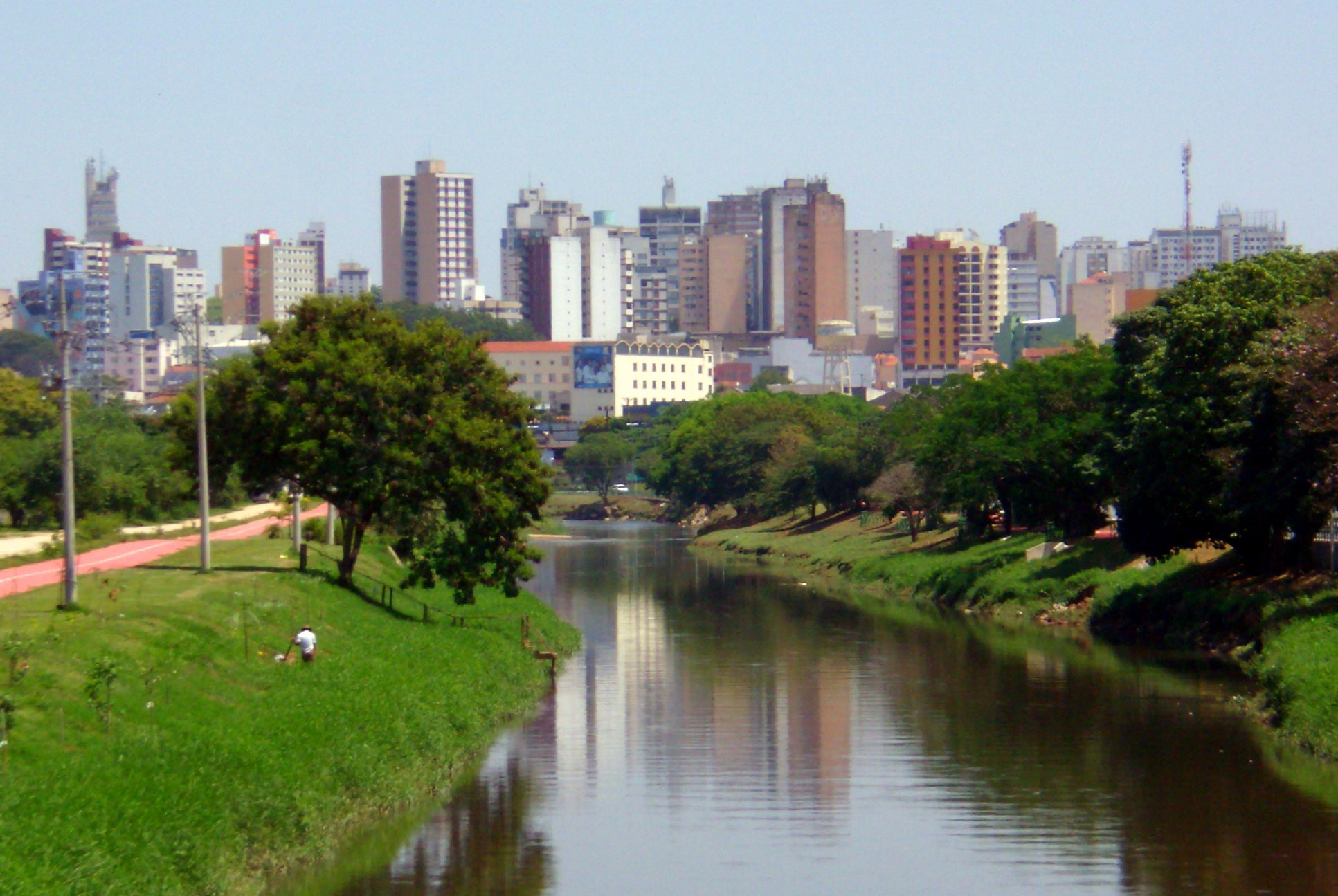
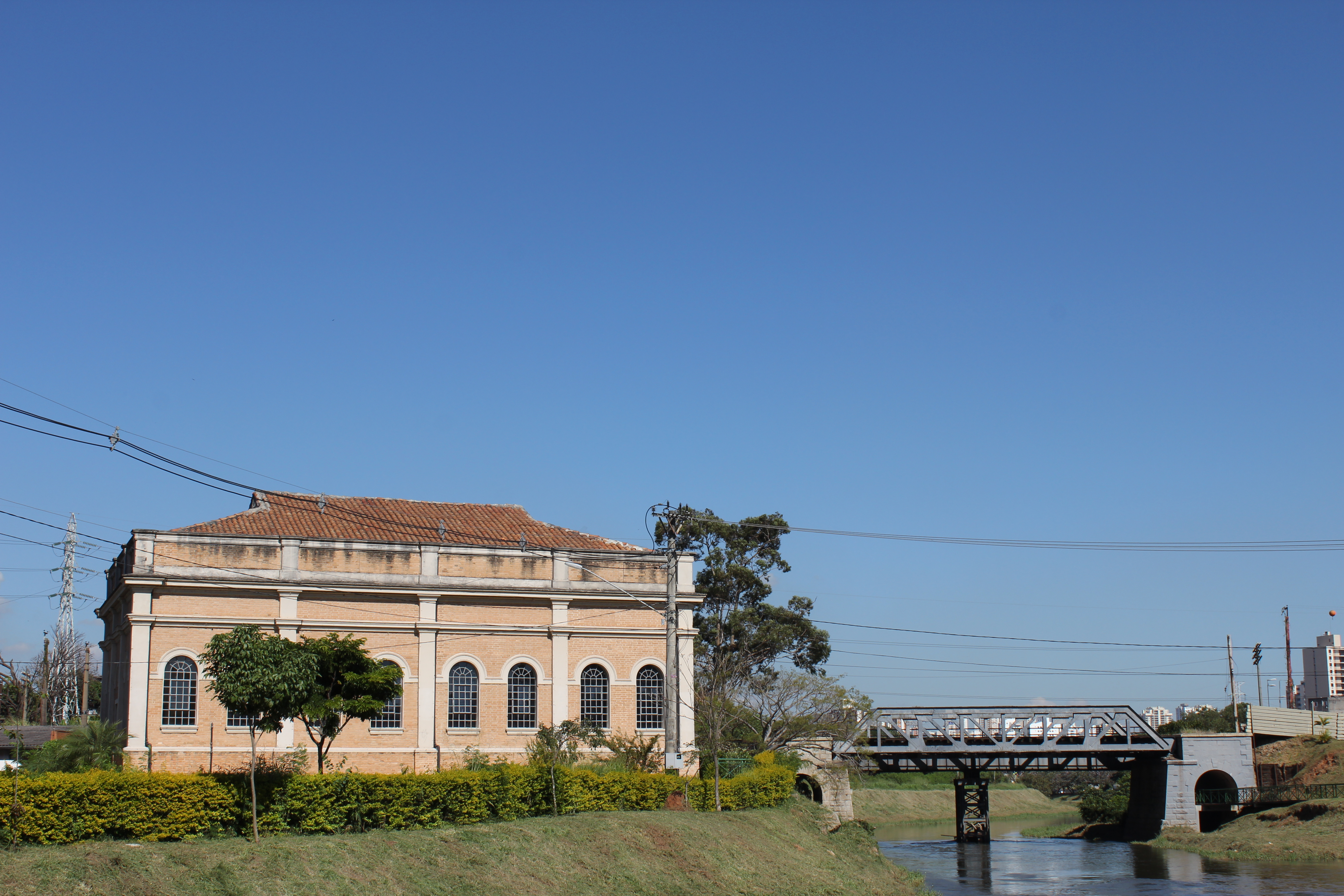
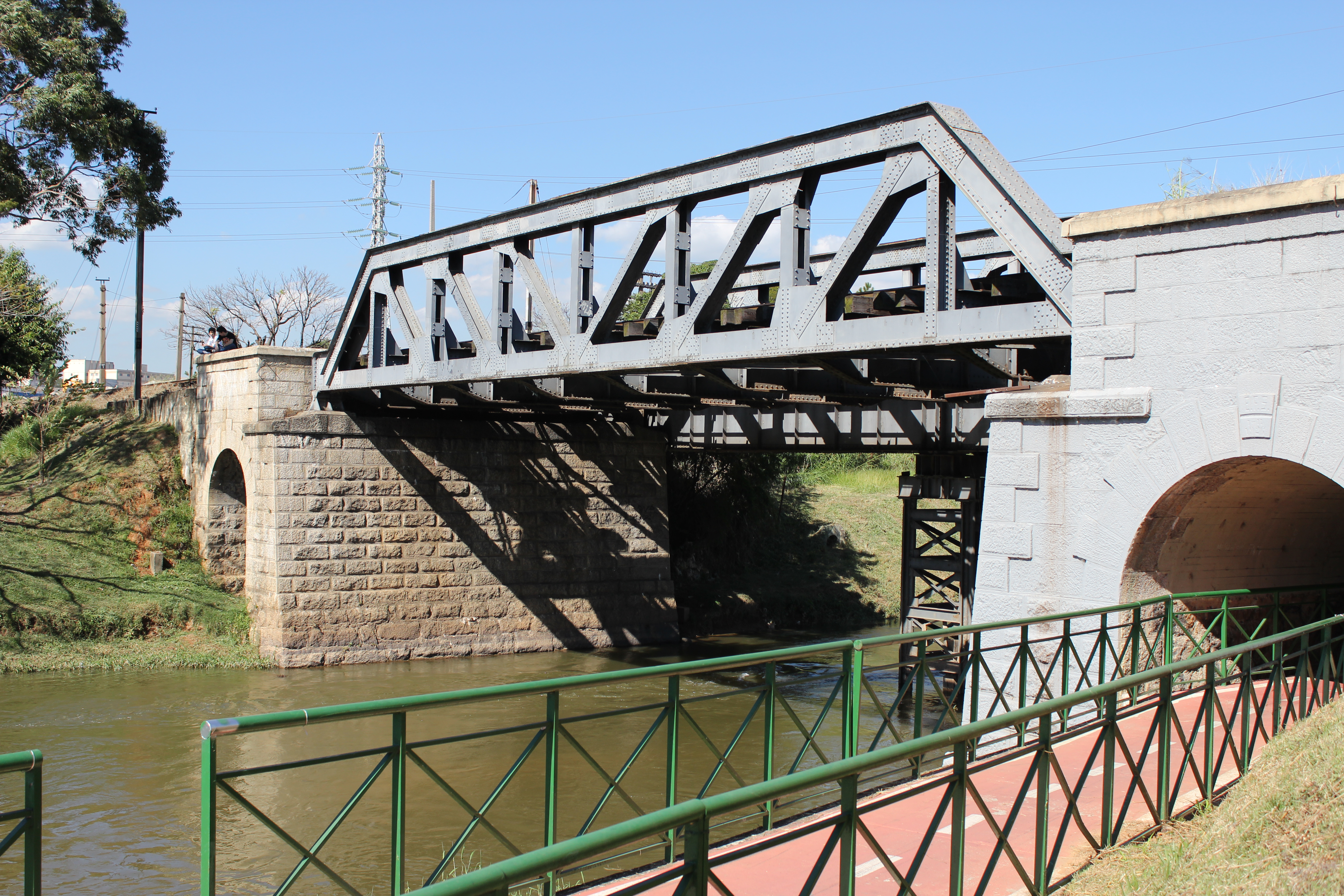
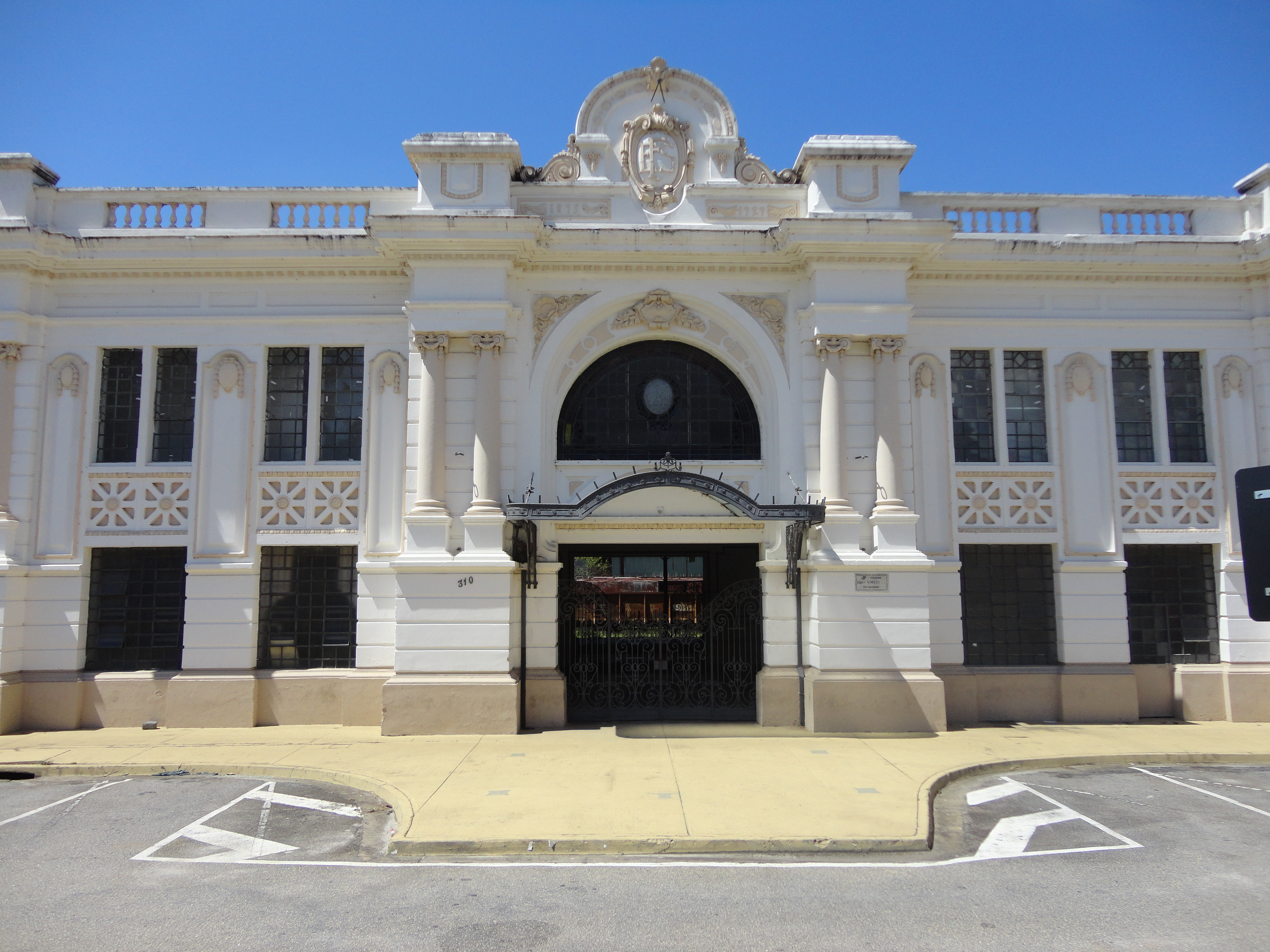
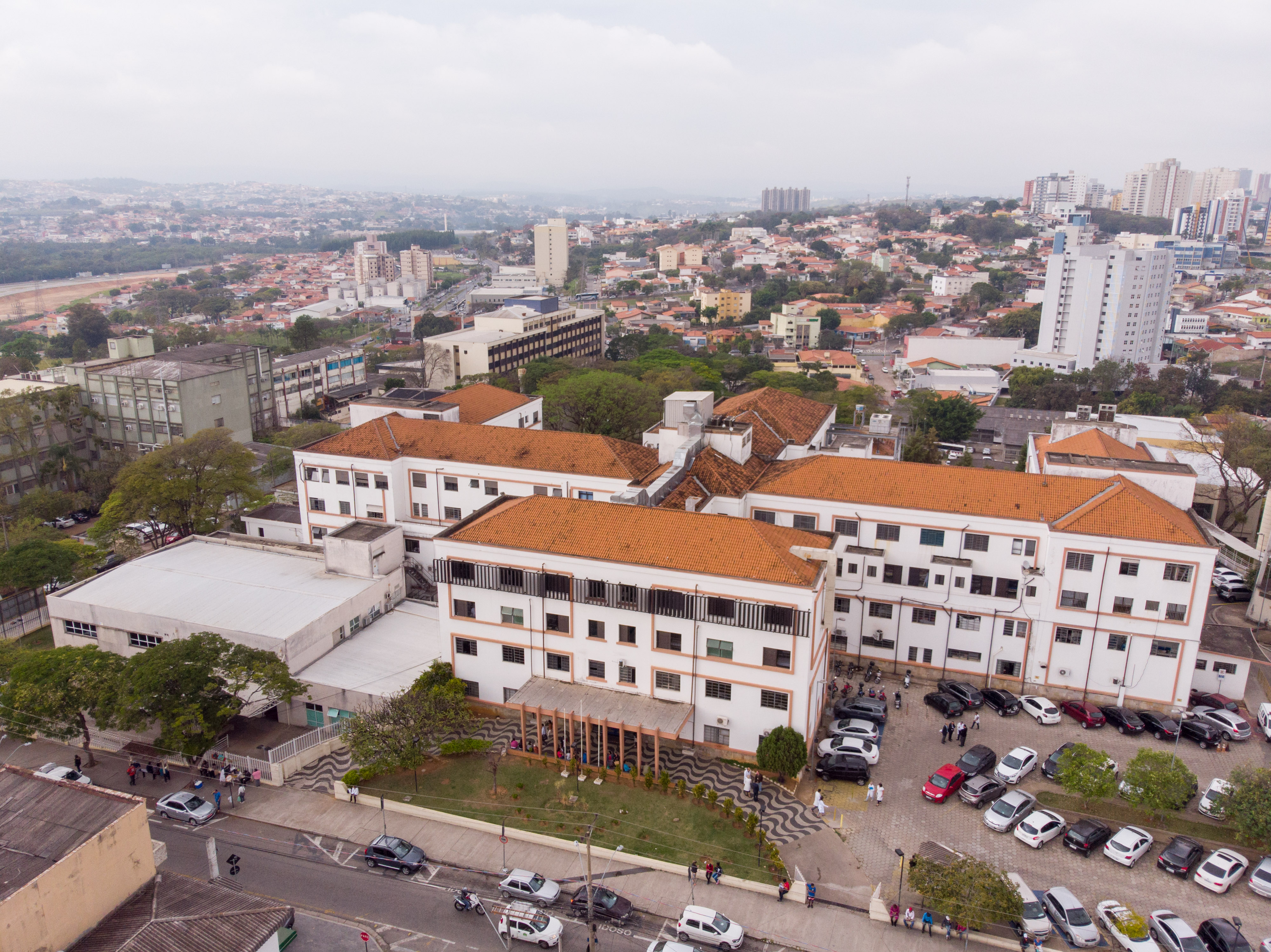
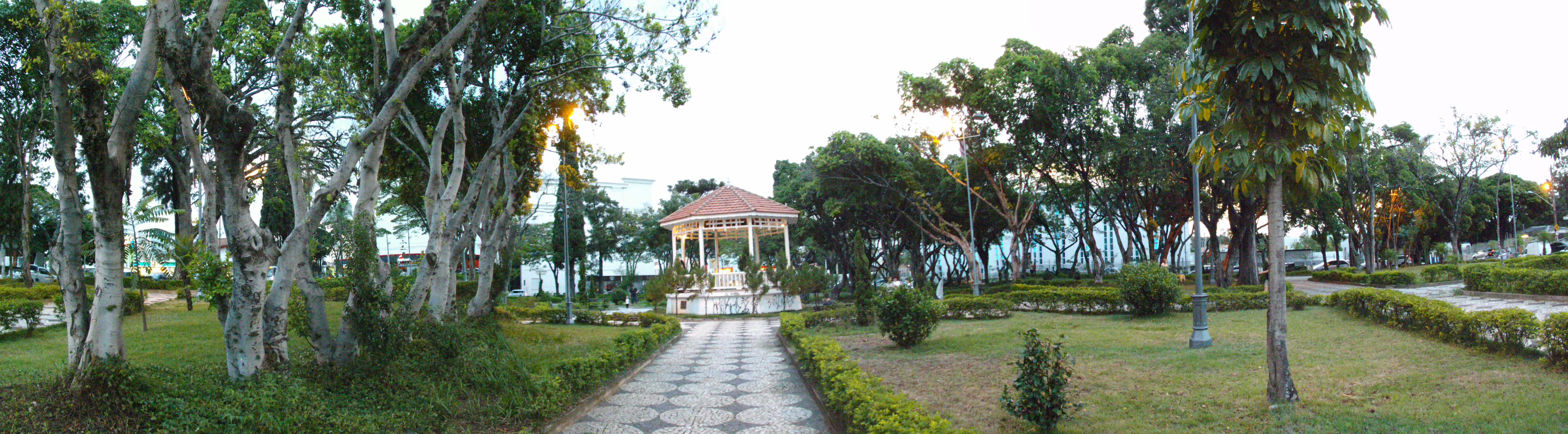

- Flag Coat of arms
- Motto: Pro una libera Patria pugnavi (Latin) "I fought for a free Fatherland"
- Location in São Paulo
- Coordinates: 23°30′6″S 47°27′29″W
- Country: Brazil
- Region: Southeast Brazil
- State: São Paulo
- Metropolitan Region: Sorocaba
- Founded: 1654
- Founder: Baltazar Fernandes
- Named for: Sorocaba River

Government
  - Type: Mayor–Council
  - Mayor: Fernando Martins da Costa Neto (acting vice)[2] (PSD, 2025– ) (Republicanos)

Area
  - Municipality: 450 km^{2} (170 sq mi)
- Elevation: 601 m (1,972 ft)

Population (2025 estimate)
  - Municipality: 762,172
  - Density: 1,700/km^{2} (4,400/sq mi)
  - Metro: 723,000
- Demonym: sorocabano
- Area code: +55 15
- HDI (2010): 0.798 – high
- Website: sorocaba.sp.gov.br

Sorocaba (Portuguese pronunciation: [soɾoˈkabɐ]) is a municipality in the interior of the state of São Paulo, Brazil. With over 723,000 inhabitants, it is the seventh-largest city in the state and the second-largest outside the Greater São Paulo region, ranking behind only Campinas. It forms its own Metropolitan Region of Sorocaba, comprising 27 municipalities with a total population of 2 million inhabitants, the 15th most populous in Brazil.

With a surface area of 450,38 km² (or about 170 sq mi), Sorocaba is integrated with Greater São Paulo and the Metropolitan Regions of Campinas, Jundiaí, Paraíba Valley and North Coast and Baixada Santista, forming the São Paulo macrometropolis, which is home to over 30 million people, about three quarters of the state's population and the first such urban agglomeration in the Southern Hemisphere.

The city is highly industrialized, with its industrial production reaching over 120 countries and a GDP of over R$ 32 billion, the 19th-largest in Brazil, surpassing state capitals such as São Luís, Belém, Vitória, Natal, and Florianópolis. Over 22,000 companies operate in the city, 2,000 of which are industries.

== History ==
Dom Francisco de Sousa, general governor of Brazil (1591 to 1602), believing in the existence of gold in the region, settled the Pelourinho —a Portuguese translation of the English "pillory", symbol of the Royal power, as the village Nova Vila de Nossa Senhora da Ponte de Mont Serrat. When gold wasn't found there, the governor returned to the Royal Court. Twelve years later, Dom Francisco de Sousa changed the name of the village to Itavuvu.

Baltasar Fernandes, a member of an expeditionary group called Bandeirantes, laid the foundation of Sorocaba in the 1654. The chapel of Nossa Senhora da Ponte (which is now the Cathedral located in Fernando Prestes square, downtown) was built by him, along with the São Bento de Parnaíba monastery (now São Bento monastery) years later. It was also Fernandes who brought the first Benedictine monks to teach, assist the poor and the ill, and convert the Native Americans of the region. The monastery was donated to the Benedictines in the year 1660, after which Friar Anselmo da Anunciação and Friar Mauro were chosen to take office. The first streets and houses started to spread around the neighborhood.

In the year of 1661, Baltasar Fernandes went to São Paulo to request that Sorocaba be named a village from the governor, Correia de Sá e Benevides. Thus, on March 3, 1661, Sorocaba became known as Vila de Nossa Senhora da Ponte de Sorocaba. The organization of the Municipal Council followed shortly, with the main nominees being: Baltasar Fernandes and André de Zunega (judges), Cláudio Furquim and Pascoal Leite Pais (city councillors), Domingos Garcia (procurator) and Francisco Sanches (clerk).

With the arrival of colonel Cristóvão Pereira de Abreu and his troops in 1773, begins the main chapter of the history of Sorocaba: the Tropeirismo.

The transportation of goods on the back of mules, that traversed the North-South route of the country came across Sorocaba, which was strategically placed in the main route between Rio Grande do Sul, Minas Gerais and Rio de Janeiro. Soon Sorocaba had its own Feira de Muares (mule/horse fair), where troops from all states came to feed and rest their cavalry on the way to the mineral and forest expeditions, and buy and sell goods, horses and enslaved Africans. Given the growing number of people working in the city, the commerce and the first industries began to appear. Goods bought in Sorocaba were known from across the Country, spread by the merchant troops. The main events of Tropeirismo comprehended a hundred years of the Sorocaba history, from 1770 to 1870. The Tropeirismo is also responsible for spreading a locally manufactured type of Knife that became known in Brazil is as the Sorocaban Knife.

During the American Civil War, English textile industries ran out of cotton, which was imported from the Southern United States. Soon, manufactures from England started to search around the world for alternative places to cultivate cotton - one of them was the then-Province of São Paulo, which included Sorocaba. In 1862, Lieutenant-Colonel Francisco Gonçalves de Oliveira Machado started the first cotton plantation in Sorocaba. The local environment and weather were ideal, and the plantation flourished. The first harvest exceeded all expectations, starting another cycle of industrial and economic development. Several textile industries from England built branches in the city, changing the landscape with chimneys, saw-styled roofs, large, orange brick-built buildings and smoke. During this time, Sorocaba received the title of Manchester Paulista--"São Paulo native" in Portuguese, given the resemblance with its laboring twin city.

With the opening of the Estrada de Ferro Sorocabana on June 20, 1872 and its transport of cotton products, animals and passengers to São Paulo, Sorocaba had a major leap in development. Six locomotives and 62 bandwagons were brought from England, with seven stations initially planned.

Telegraphic services started on April 3, 1873. Years later, the railway expanded to the borders of the state, with Sorocaba station as the hub.

== Geography ==
=== Location ===
The city is located in the southeastern region of the state of São Paulo, 92 km away from the state capital. The main highways are Castelo Branco (SP-280) and Raposo Tavares (SP-270). It straddles the Sorocaba River, a tributary of the left bank of the Tiete river. The municipality of Sorocaba is located on the Tropic of Capricorn, at latitude 23° 26 '16 " for the season of 2011, passes along the neighborhoods of Aparecidinha and Parque São Bento districts. At the junction of Highway José Ermírio José de Morais (SP-75) with the connection to the Raposo Tavares highway is a milestone signaling the Tropic. Among Brazil's largest cities (by population), Sorocaba is in 30th place. Sorocaba is among the major cities in São Paulo (population), is ranked ninth.

=== Climate ===
Sorocaba climate is subtropical, with the coldest month being July and warmest in January and February. Precipitation is around 1,300 mm (51.2 inches). According to Köppen, Sorocaba can be classified as a Cwa climate, featuring a warm climate with summer rainfall and temperature in the warmest month ≥ 22 °C (72 °F).

The climate table below shows the monthly mean temperatures, maximum and minimum recorded, rainfall and rainy days with monthly and annual averages for the period from 1 January 1995 to January 1, 2011 for the city of Sorocaba.

Climate data for Sorocaba, elevation 598 m (1,962 ft), (1981–2010 normals, extremes 1961–2001)
Month	Jan	Feb	Mar	Apr	May	Jun	Jul	Aug	Sep	Oct	Nov	Dec	Year
Record high °C (°F)	37.2 (99.0)	37.4 (99.3)	35.8 (96.4)	34.2 (93.6)	31.2 (88.2)	29.7 (85.5)	31.1 (88.0)	34.1 (93.4)	36.4 (97.5)	37.8 (100.0)	38.2 (100.8)	36.2 (97.2)	38.2 (100.8)
Mean daily maximum °C (°F)	29.2 (84.6)	30.0 (86.0)	29.4 (84.9)	27.6 (81.7)	24.8 (76.6)	23.9 (75.0)	24.0 (75.2)	25.8 (78.4)	26.4 (79.5)	27.8 (82.0)	28.8 (83.8)	29.1 (84.4)	27.2 (81.0)
Daily mean °C (°F)	23.5 (74.3)	23.9 (75.0)	23.3 (73.9)	21.6 (70.9)	18.6 (65.5)	17.1 (62.8)	17.0 (62.6)	18.4 (65.1)	19.6 (67.3)	21.1 (70.0)	22.4 (72.3)	23.0 (73.4)	20.8 (69.4)
Mean daily minimum °C (°F)	19.6 (67.3)	19.7 (67.5)	19.1 (66.4)	17.4 (63.3)	14.1 (57.4)	12.3 (54.1)	12.0 (53.6)	13.0 (55.4)	14.7 (58.5)	16.3 (61.3)	17.7 (63.9)	18.7 (65.7)	16.2 (61.2)
Record low °C (°F)	11.2 (52.2)	13.9 (57.0)	10.6 (51.1)	5.5 (41.9)	3.1 (37.6)	2.0 (35.6)	1.0 (33.8)	1.2 (34.2)	5.2 (41.4)	8.5 (47.3)	11.0 (51.8)	12.6 (54.7)	1.0 (33.8)
Average precipitation mm (inches)	284.2 (11.19)	155.5 (6.12)	142.9 (5.63)	64.7 (2.55)	82.5 (3.25)	54.5 (2.15)	55.7 (2.19)	31.9 (1.26)	67.9 (2.67)	100.6 (3.96)	131.5 (5.18)	183.7 (7.23)	1,355.6 (53.37)
Average precipitation days (≥ 1.0 mm)	15	12	9	5	7	4	4	4	7	9	9	13	98
Average relative humidity (%)	77.7	75.9	75.8	76.4	76.7	76.5	72.7	68.4	69.9	71.5	71.8	74.5	74.0
Mean monthly sunshine hours	149.7	161.4	189.3	180.2	177.5	166.8	187.1	202.0	168.0	177.9	178.6	161.4	2,099.9
Source: Instituto Nacional de Meteorologia

=== Land relief ===
The terrain is classified as a wavy strands and characterized by local ridges, with an average altitude of 632 meters above the sea level. The highest altitude is 1028 meters, in the Serra de Sao Francisco. The lower altitude is 539 meters, in the valley of the Sorocaba River. Sorocaba is located on the edge of the Peripheral Depression of São Paulo state, in the Appalachian Fall Line, as defined by Professor Aziz Ab'Saber. This configuration is due to the fact Sorocaba lies at the boundary between the Atlantic Plateau, which covers the area of crystalline rocks, with higher relief and the rocks of the Parana Sedimentary Basin and gently rolling topography with lower altitudes. The Sorocaba River and its hydrographic basin are responsible for the relief dissection.

=== Soil ===
The soil is characterized as red-yellow podzolic type, with gravelly clay, heavy clay, Typic dark clayey; oxisol with clay loam. Lithosols also occur, which are usually developed with little depressions.

=== Vegetation ===
The original natural vegetation was the Atlantic Forest, with local regions in a Montana Tropical Rainforest. Predominate the savannah vegetation in various stages of secondary succession.

=== Geology ===
Sorocaba is located exactly on the limit between the sedimentary rocks of Parana Sedimentary Basin (Itararé Group, in glacial and deltaic palaeoenvironments of Permian-Carboniferous age) and crystalline basement (Neoproterozoic). Important granite massifs are Sorocaba Massif (calc-alkaline I-Type) and São Francisco Massif (Subalkaline, A-Type). Metamorphic low grade rocks as phyllites, metacalcareous, metarenites, are marine metassediments are included in Sao Roque Group (Neoproterozoic) with structural trend northeast-southwest. The Ipanema Hill or Araçoiaba Ridge is a prominent and isolated topographic elevation, it comprises ultrabasic-alkaline intrusion age (Mesozoic, Early Cretaceous), remnant of ancient volcano. It was the first iron mine, ironworks and metallurgy of Brazil, Ipanema. The ore was exploited from magnetite, probably associated to carbonatite body.

== Demographics ==
Historical population (municipality)
Year	Population	%±
1920	43,323
1940	70,299	62.3%
1950	93,928	33.6%
1960	138,323	47.3%
1970	175,677	27.0%
1980	269,888	53.6%
1991	379,006	40.4%
2000	493,468	30.2%
2010	586,625	18.9%
2022	723,682	23.4%

According to IBGE, 2010 Census, the population of Sorocaba was 586,311 inhabitants. There was a growth of 18.81% compared to 2000. The population density is 1,305.46 inhabitants per square kilometer. Women are the majority in Sorocaba, being 51.1% of the total population. In absolute numbers, there are 299,513 women and 286,798 men, 12,715 more women than men. There is a large predominance of urban population in Sorocaba, with only 1% of the population (5,971 residents) living in rural areas, compared with 580,340 in urban areas. Among the largest cities in Brazil (in population), Sorocaba is in 30th place. Among the largest cities in São Paulo (in population), it is ranked ninth.

== Industry ==
Sorocaba's industrial park is well-served by roads, highways, and public transportation. The industrial park boasts more than 25 million square meters and over 1,600 industries. Main economic activities are: industrial machinery, heavy metallurgy, ironmaking and steelmaking, automotive parts, industrial textiles, agricultural equipment, chemical and petrochemical, cement production, solar module manufacturing, eolic energy, pharmaceutics, paper and cellulose, electronics, telecommunications, tools, commerce and services. Its tools, automotive parts and pharmaceutics industry are the biggest in Brazil.

The Ferroban railroad (formerly Sorocabana Railway and FEPASA) are connected to São Paulo and the Santos Seaport, the largest seaport in South America. The railroad is also an important link to Mercosur, reaching both Argentina and Bolivia.

Sorocaba also boasts a dry port terminal, which provides efficient road linkages to the various ports and airports of the region including Bertram Luiz Leupolz Airport, which has one of the busiest cargo terminals in the State. A second airport, with much higher traffic and passenger capacity is currently being planned for the upcoming years.

== Economy ==
Sorocaba's economic development is fifth in the state, with investments in the order of US$3,5 billion, with US$3 billion in Gross Domestic Product. Its industries export to over 115 countries, with an income of US$370 million per year. There are over eight thousand commerce organizations and another 8,000 service businesses.

== Education ==
Sorocaba has nine universities, seven private: University of Medical and Health Sciences at the Catholic University of São Paulo (PUC-SP), University of Sorocaba (UNISO), ESAMC Sorocaba, Anhanguera, Uirapuru Superior, Academia de Letras de Sorocaba, University Paulista (UNIP), and two public Universidade Estadual Paulista Julio de Mesquita Filho | Universidade Estadual Paulista (UNESP) and University of São Carlos (UFSCar).

It also has nine colleges: Law School of Sorocaba (FADI), recommended by OAB the year 2007 the FADI received the seal of quality issued by the institution to law courses that have had the best quality indexes in recent years. Engineering College of Sorocaba (FACENS), College of Technology of São Paulo - Sorocaba (FATEC-SO), College of Physical Education YMCA Sorocaba (FEFISO), Manchester Paulista Institute of Higher Education (IMAP), Academy of Higher Education (AES), Graduate School of Management, Marketing and Communication (ESAMC) Anhanguera Educational Sorocabano Uirapuru Education Center and the Union of Educational Institutions of São Paulo (UNIESP), among others schools.

There are four hundred public schools between municipal and private ones from elementary to high school, many with professionalizing courses. National Industry and Commerce Service Institutions like SENAI SENAC | Senac, are also present in the city, besides the State Technical School of London | State Technical School and Rubens de Faria e Souza, State Technical School of São Paulo | Technical School Fernando Prestes de Albuquerque and the Polytechnic School of Sorocaba (free of charge), which also houses the Standart School of Sorocaba, Antonio Padilha school.

== Health ==
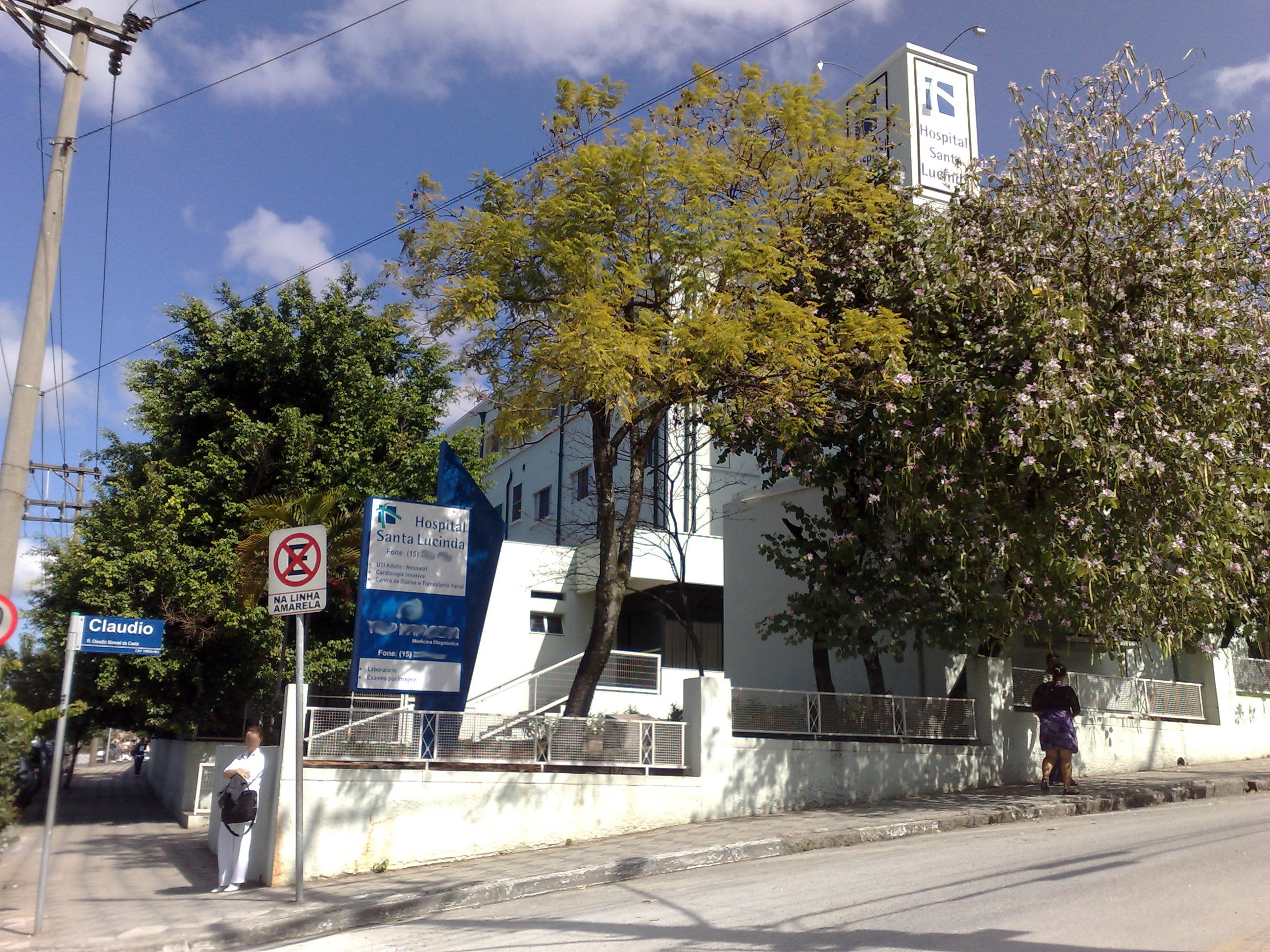
Hospital Santa Lucinda, located in Sorocaba Hospital Complex of the Sorocaba Conjunto Hospitalar ZonaSul

The city's health care is well served with many hospitals like Hospital Santa Lucinda, Conjunto Hospitalar de Sorocaba, Santa Casa de Misericórdia (founded over 200 years ago), Evangelical Hospital, Samaritan Hospital, Hospital Unimed, etc. The Ophthalmological Hospital is the hospital that performs more transplants and corneal uptake in Brazil. It was honored at the Distinction Award in Organ Donation of the Secretariat of Health of Brazil and has succeeded in eliminating the waiting list for transplants in the region of Sorocaba and the entire city of São Paulo.

Hospital Santa Lucinda achieved its 100th kidney transplant in 2004. In 2007, we opened 12 rooms with high-tech equipment, the result of an investment of about $2.5 million from the St. Paul Foundation.

The Sorocaba Hospital Complex is responsible for servicing the tertiary level of 48 municipalities in southwest São Paulo with a population of over 3 million inhabitants. Reference state is the treatment of burn victims and in 2009 over R$5 million were investing into building a new maternity ward. The scientific work in the area of burns in the year 2009 awarded by the Brazilian Society of Plastic Surgery and was coordinated by Dr. Hamilton Aleardo Gonella and held at CHS. For a year, Gonella's team researched the application of nanocrystalline silver dressings. The technique, tested in five patients of CHS, showed positive results, expanding the range of dressing change which reduces the patient's suffering and costs in hospital care. The Plastic Surgery Service CHS has 34 awards for scientific work in various areas. About burns, are at least ten.

The Ambulatory Hernia Surgery is the CHS model, several training sessions are conducted for surgeons throughout the country. Sorocaba is a technique performed the cut is between 2 and 2.5 cm, smaller than the procedures used elsewhere.

The Faculty of Medicine of Sorocaba—the first medical school in the interior of Brazil—was founded in 1950 and is one of the most responsible for Sorocaba be a reference center for health in Brazil having formed many renowned professionals.

== Media ==
In telecommunications, the city was served by Telecomunicações de São Paulo. In July 1998, this company was acquired by Telefônica, which adopted the Vivo brand in 2012. The company is currently an operator of cell phones, fixed lines, internet (fiber optics/4G) and television (satellite and cable).

== Resources ==
Two International Convention Centers are available. Sorocaba's three main newspapers are the Jornal Bom Dia, Cruzeiro do Sul and the Diário de Sorocaba.

== Sights ==
There are many parks open to the public, such as historical churches, walking and racing courses, historical monuments, museums, mausoleums and memorials, various spas and horse farms. The municipal Zoo "Quinzinho de Barros", is one of the largest zoos in South America.

== Sport ==
The main sporting venue in the city is Estádio Municipal Walter Ribeiro. The city's main association football team is EC São Bento. There is also a second team Atlético Sorocaba which in October 2016 the professional team licensed the professional competitions. Liga Sorocabana de Basquete is the city's main basketball team. There is a futsal team named Magnus Futsal which the main title were 2016 and 2018 Intercontinental Futsal Cup.

== Transport ==
Railway - Estrada de Ferro Sorocabana

=== Airport ===
Sorocaba Airport is used by small aircraft and it is served by almost no commercial flights. The services provided are mainly for cargo transport.

Azul Brazilian Airlines offers free bus transfers for its passengers between Sorocaba and Campinas-Viracopos International Airport at regular times.

=== Highways ===
- SP-75 - Rod. Santos Dumont (Sorocaba - Campinas)
- SP-79 - Rod. Waldomiro Correa de Camargo (Sorocaba - Itu), Rod. Raimundo Antunes Soares (Sorocaba - Piedade)
- SP-91/270 - Rodovia Dr. Celso Charuri (interligação entre as rodovias Raposo Tavares e Senador José Ermírio de Morais (Castelinho)
- SP-97 - Rod. Emerenciano Prestes de Barros (Sorocaba - Porto Feliz)
- SP-264 - Rod. João Leme dos Santos (Sorocaba - Salto de Pirapora)
- SP-270 - Rod. Raposo Tavares (Sorocaba - São Paulo, Sorocaba - Presidente Prudente)
- SP-280 - Rod. Castelo Branco (Sorocaba - São Paulo, Sorocaba - Ourinhos e Norte do Paraná)
- SP-354 - Rod. Sorocaba - Iperó

=== Urban Transport ===
Sorocaba has four urban bus terminals: São Paulo,Santo Antônio,Vitória Régia and São Bento.

=== Bike/cycle lanes ===
The city has 60 kilometers of bike lanes created in the city's main avenues, and it can be crossed only using bicycles for transportation. The planning of the municipality provides for the construction of the largest cycling network in Latin America in coming years and implement a public bike system, similar to European cities as Barcelona and Paris. Sorocaba is currently the second-largest cycling loop of Brazil, after Rio de Janeiro.

== Administration ==
The current mayor is Rodrigo Maganhato (REPUBLICANOS), who has been in office since January 1, 2021.

== Twin towns – sister cities ==
Sorocaba is twinned with:

- Anyang, Gyeonggi-do, South Korea
- Nanchang, Jiangxi, China
- Hegyvidék, Hungary
- Wuxi, Jiangsu, China

== Notable people ==
- Átila Abreu, racing driver
- Francisco Adolfo de Varnhagen, diplomat and Viscount of Porto Seguro
- Rafael Tobias de Aguiar, military officer and politician
- Marinho Peres, football player
- Diego Farias, football player

== See also ==
- List of municipalities in São Paulo
- Interior of São Paulo
