= Indaiatuba =

- Municipality
- Município de Indaiatuba; Municipality of Indaiatuba
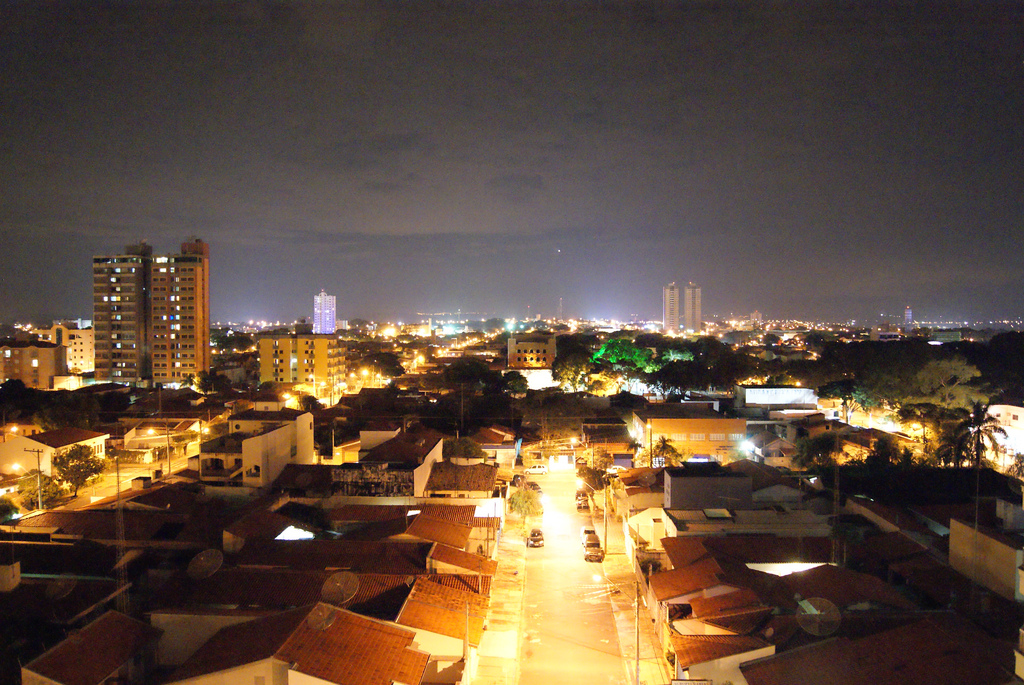
- Night-time view of the city

- Flag Coat of arms

- Location in the state of São Paulo

- Location in Brazil
- Coordinates: 23°05′25″S 47°13′05″W
- Country: Brazil
- Region: Southeast
- State: São Paulo
- Metropolitan Region: Campinas
- Founded: December 9, 1830

Area
  - Total: 311.55 km^{2} (120.29 sq mi)
- Elevation: 624 m (2,047 ft)

Population (2022 Brazilian census)
  - Total: 255,748
  - Estimate (2025): 269,657
  - Density: 820.89/km^{2} (2,126.1/sq mi)
- Time zone: UTC−3 (BRT)
  - Summer (DST): UTC−2 (BRST)
- Website: Indaiatuba.sp.gov.br

Indaiatuba is a municipality in the state of São Paulo, Brazil. It is part of the Metropolitan Region of Campinas. The population is 255,748 (2022 census) in an area of 311.5 km^{2} (120.3 sq mi). The elevation is 624 m (2,047 ft). The city's name derives from the Tupi language, which roughly translates to "gathering of palm trees". It is an important city in one of Brazil's main industrial regions.

Based on the latest IFDM social index data, Indaiatuba is ranked number one of the "Top 100 best cities to live in, in Brazil."

The Federation of Industries of Rio de Janeiro surveyed data and compared information on education, health, income, and employment (including wages and formal job creation) of all the municipalities within the country. With this data, they have created the Firjan Development Index Municipal (IFDM), which enabled the elaboration of a ranking system of the top 100 best cities to live in Brazil.

Data was collected from the Ministries of Education, Health and Labour for all municipalities.

== History ==
Indaiatuba was established in the late 18th century as a rural district within the town of Itu and its site was situated along a major corridor used for the transportation of military personnel and commodities, which facilitated its development and economic growth. The settlement, initially known as "Indayatiba", was first documented in a 1768 census. The area was also referred to as Cocais due to the abundance of Indaiá palm trees.

In the early 19th century, Indaiatuba was primarily an agricultural region. A significant landmark from this period is the Casarão do Pau Preto, a large house built between 1810 and 1820. The house was part of a sugar plantation and later a coffee plantation, reflecting the agricultural activity of the time.

The establishment of a chapel allowed Indaiatuba to become a local civic center. The chapel, which later became the Igreja Matriz de Nossa Senhora da Candelária, is one of the few remaining colonial-era religious buildings made of rammed earth in São Paulo. The area around the chapel developed into a town square, Largo da Candelária, which was the heart of the community.

Indaiatuba gained political autonomy from Itu in 1859 when it was elevated to the status of a village. This led to the establishment of its own Câmara de Vereadores (town council).

The railroad's arrival in the late 19th century significantly changed Indaiatuba's urban landscape. The railroad connected the town to São Paulo, facilitating the movement of people and goods. It also led to the arrival of immigrants from various countries, who primarily engaged in agriculture and contributed to the town's economic development.

With the beginning of the Republican period in Brazil, Indaiatuba's civic center shifted to the Largo da Cadeia (currently called Praça Prudente de Moraes). The square housed important civic buildings, including the Câmara, the Cadeia (jail), and the Prefeitura (city hall).

The mid-20th century saw a period of modernization and growth in Indaiatuba. The town's economy diversified into various agricultural products and industries. The population doubled between 1954 and 1964, accompanied by the establishment of different businesses and public services.

Indaiatuba's urban development was guided by a grid plan in the 19th century, which is still preserved in its historic center. In the 1960s, the town implemented its first urban plan. Later, in the 1980s, a new plan designed by Ruy Ohtake proposed the creation of the Parque Ecológico as a central element of the town's urban expansion.

Indaiatuba has experienced rapid population growth and economic development in recent decades. The town has consistently ranked high in economic growth indices and is well-connected to the surrounding region and the world through modern highways and Viracopos International Airport.

== Immigration ==
Indaiatuba is home to "Helvetia", a notable community of Swiss-descended immigrants. Each year, the colony hosts a festival to honor its unique customs and traditions. A prominent feature of the community is its shooting range, where members practice this traditional Swiss sport. In addition, Indaiatuba boasts a significant Nikkei population (people of Japanese descent), who actively contribute to the city's cultural landscape. Each year, they host a festival celebrating their rich heritage, showcasing various aspects of Japanese culture and its impact on the city.

The aforementioned community's influence also extends to sports, particularly baseball. The Japanese Brazilian institution ACENBI (Associação Cultural e Esportiva Nipo Brasileira de Indaiatuba) serves as a central hub for this activity, providing facilities for practices and tournaments for local teams.

== Media ==
In telecommunications, the city was served by Companhia Telefônica Brasileira until 1973, when it began to be served by Telecomunicações de São Paulo. In July 1998, this company was acquired by Telefónica, which adopted the Vivo brand in 2012.

The company is currently an operator of cellphones, landlines, internet (fiber optics/4G) and television (satellite and cable).

== Transportation ==
Viracopos International Airport is located 10 km from Indaiatuba, with easy access via the SP-75. Metropolitan bus lines run this route, from the Indaiatuba Bus Station directly to Viracopos and vice versa.

== Climate ==
Climate data for Indaiatuba, elevation 595 m (1,952 ft), (2008–2020 normals, extremes 2007–2022)
Month	Jan	Feb	Mar	Apr	May	Jun	Jul	Aug	Sep	Oct	Nov	Dec	Year
Record high °C (°F)	37.9 (100.2)	37.8 (100.0)	35.5 (95.9)	34.2 (93.6)	31.6 (88.9)	30.3 (86.5)	31.2 (88.2)	34.7 (94.5)	38.5 (101.3)	40.2 (104.4)	36.9 (98.4)	36.8 (98.2)	40.2 (104.4)
Mean daily maximum °C (°F)	30.3 (86.5)	31.0 (87.8)	29.9 (85.8)	28.6 (83.5)	25.8 (78.4)	24.8 (76.6)	25.4 (77.7)	26.6 (79.9)	28.8 (83.8)	29.6 (85.3)	29.6 (85.3)	30.6 (87.1)	28.4 (83.1)
Daily mean °C (°F)	25.0 (77.0)	25.5 (77.9)	24.5 (76.1)	22.8 (73.0)	19.8 (67.6)	18.7 (65.7)	18.7 (65.7)	19.7 (67.5)	22.2 (72.0)	23.6 (74.5)	24.0 (75.2)	25.1 (77.2)	22.5 (72.5)
Mean daily minimum °C (°F)	19.7 (67.5)	20.0 (68.0)	19.2 (66.6)	17.0 (62.6)	13.8 (56.8)	12.5 (54.5)	12.0 (53.6)	12.8 (55.0)	15.5 (59.9)	17.7 (63.9)	18.3 (64.9)	19.5 (67.1)	16.5 (61.7)
Record low °C (°F)	11.5 (52.7)	15.2 (59.4)	13.0 (55.4)	8.7 (47.7)	5.2 (41.4)	1.8 (35.2)	2.4 (36.3)	1.7 (35.1)	6.0 (42.8)	10.0 (50.0)	10.7 (51.3)	12.2 (54.0)	1.7 (35.1)
Average precipitation mm (inches)	205.2 (8.08)	144.8 (5.70)	133.7 (5.26)	79.4 (3.13)	53.3 (2.10)	64.0 (2.52)	38.2 (1.50)	36.6 (1.44)	58.7 (2.31)	84.3 (3.32)	129.7 (5.11)	179.5 (7.07)	1,207.4 (47.54)
Average precipitation days (≥ 1.0 mm)	18.5	13.5	13.1	6.6	5.8	7.3	5.1	4.6	7.3	10.8	11.9	14.2	118.7
Source: Centro Integrado de Informações Agrometeorológicas

== See also ==
- List of municipalities in São Paulo
- Interior of São Paulo
