= SP-79 (São Paulo highway) =

State highway in São Paulo, Brazil

SP-079

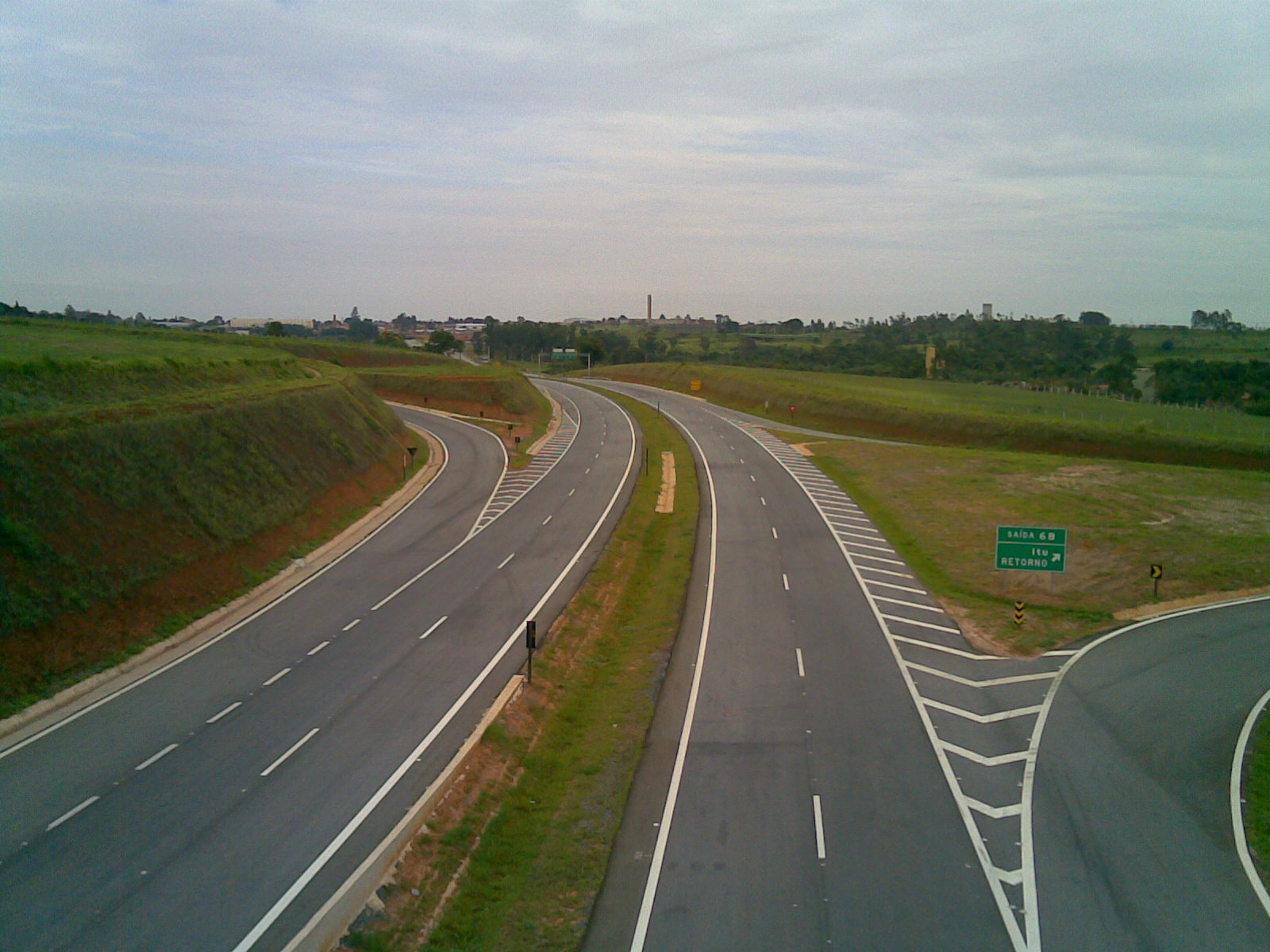

Route information
- Length: 177.630 km (110.374 mi)

Location
- Country: Brazil
- State: São Paulo

Highway system
- Highways in Brazil; Federal; São Paulo State Highways

The SP-79 is a highway in the southeastern part of the state of São Paulo in Brazil.

== Names ==
- Celestino Americo, Tenente (Tapiraí - Juquiá)
- Convençao Republicana, Rodovia (Itu's old street - Salto)
- Guilherme Hovel-Svd, Padre (Piedade - Tapiraí)
- Raimundo Antunes Soares (Votorantim - Piedade)
- Waldomiro Correa de Camargo (Sorocaba - Itu)

== Route ==
The highway begins at the junction with SP-75, in the municipality of Salto, enters its urban area, and continues toward Itu and Sorocaba along a dual carriageway section between Salto and Sorocaba. After Sorocaba, SP-79 overlaps with SP-264 until it reaches Votorantim.

From Votorantim onward, the highway becomes a single carriageway, passing through the urban areas of Piedade and Tapiraí, before reaching the municipality of Juquiá. The mountainous section of SP-79, between Tapiraí and Juquiá, is nicknamed "Serra de Juquiá" or "Serra da Cabeça da Anta," the latter named after a restaurant with the same name located midway along the mountain, on the roadside. In this 40 km stretch, there are no shoulders or cell phone signal, with many curves heading toward the southern coast of São Paulo.

The highway ends within the urban area of Juquiá, a few kilometers from the Rodovia Régis Bittencourt.
