= Estádio Novelli Júnior =

Soccer stadium in Itu, Brazil

- Novelli, Majestoso da Vila (Majestic of the Village)
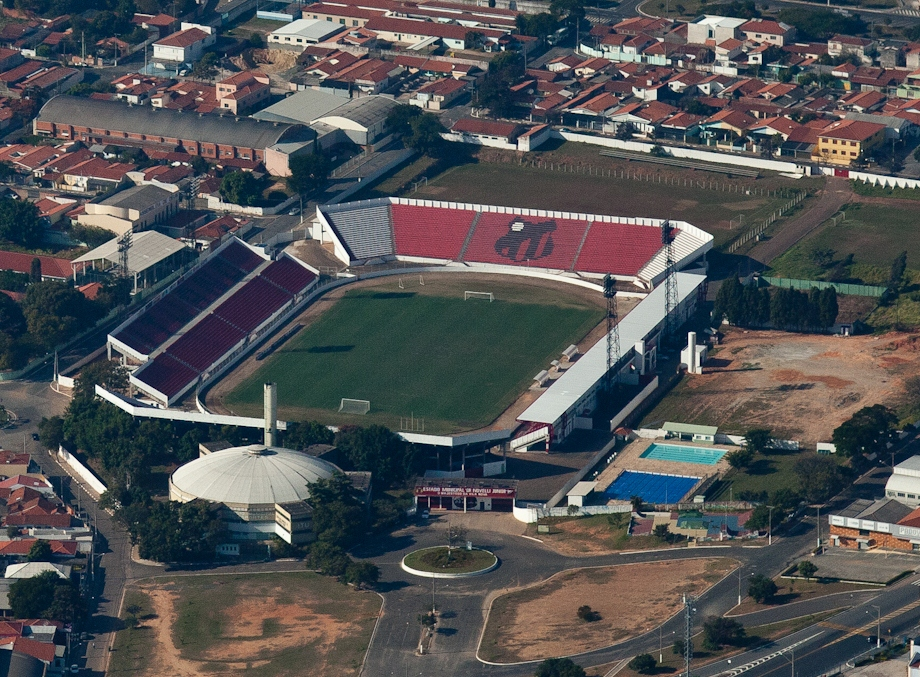
- Sisbrace
- Interactive map of Estádio Novelli Júnior
- Full name: Estádio Municipal Doutor Novelli Júnior
- Location: Itu, São Paulo, Brazil
- Coordinates: 23.280810°S 47.287675°W
- Owner: Municipality of Itu
- Capacity: 18,560
- Surface: Natural grass
- Field size: 105 by 68 metres (114.8 yd × 74.4 yd)

Construction
- Groundbreaking: 1946
- Built: 1946–1947
- Opened: 25 May 1947
- Renovated: 2011
- Expanded: 2011

Tenant
- Ituano

Estádio Municipal Dr. Novelli Júnior, usually known as Estádio Novelli Júnior, is a multi-use stadium in Itu, São Paulo, Brazil. It is used mostly for football matches. The stadium has a maximum capacity of 18,000 people.

The Estádio Novelli Júnior is owned by the Itu City Hall. Ituano Futebol Clube usually plays its home matches at the stadium.

== History ==
In 1947, the works on Estádio Novelli Júnior were completed. The inaugural match was played on May 25 of that year, when Ituano beat Amparo 6–1.
