= Law School of Sorocaba =

Law school in Sorocaba, Brazil

Law School of Sorocaba (Faculdade de Direito de Sorocaba)
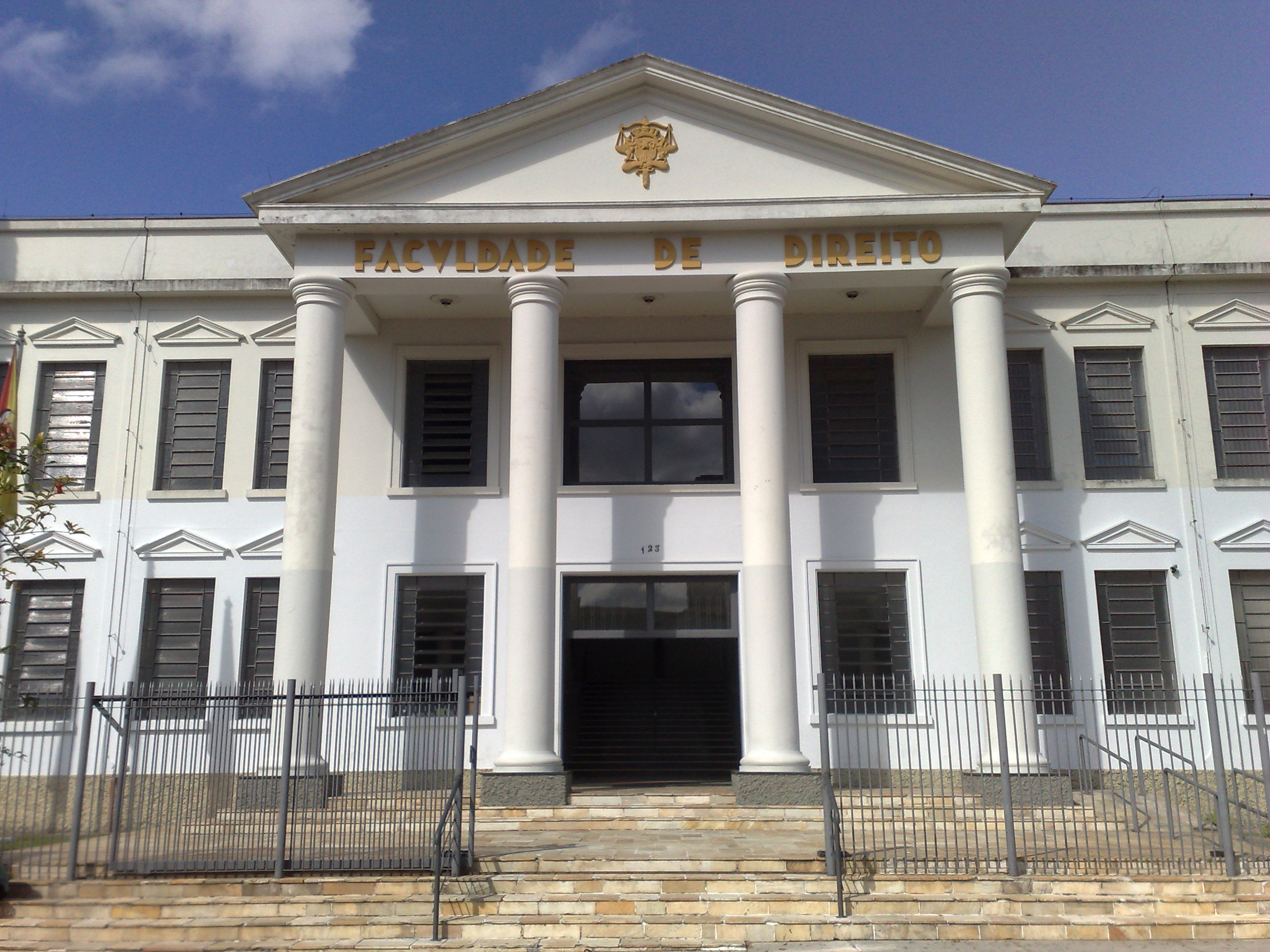
- Law School of Sorocaba
- Established: 1957
- School type: Private
- Location: Sorocaba, São Paulo, Brazil
- Enrollment: 895
- Website: www.fadi.br

The Law School of Sorocaba is a law school in Sorocaba in the state of São Paulo in Brazil.
