= Sarapuí River (São Paulo) =

Location
- Country: Brazil

Physical characteristics
- Source
  - location: São Paulo state
- Mouth
  - location: Sorocaba River
  - coordinates: 23°20′S 47°44′W

The Sarapuí River is a river of São Paulo state in southeastern Brazil. It is a tributary of the Sorocaba River, which flows into the Tietê River, an important tributary of the Paraná River.

== See also ==
- List of rivers of São Paulo
