= Itu, São Paulo =

Itu
- Municipality
- Municipality of Itu
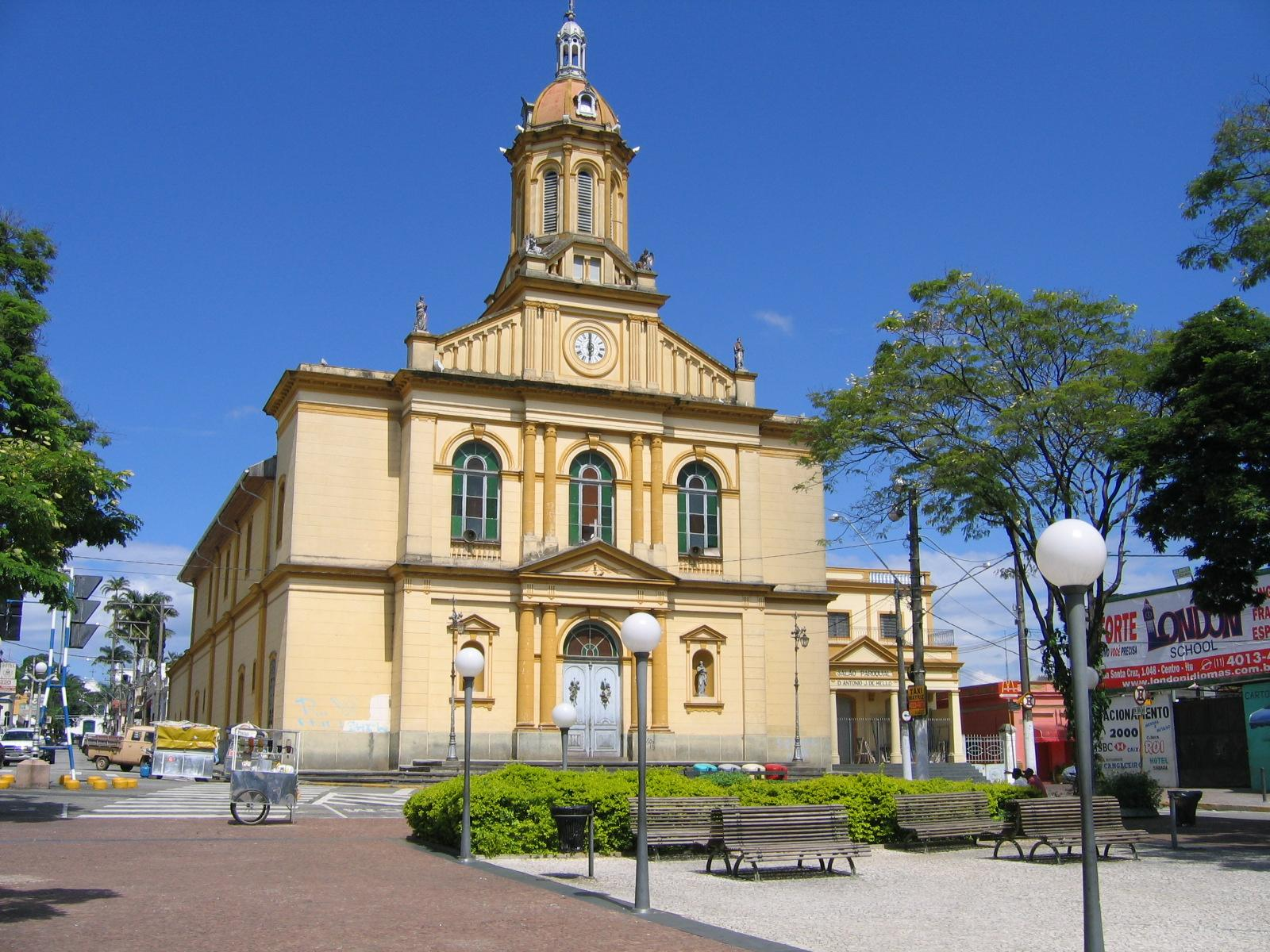
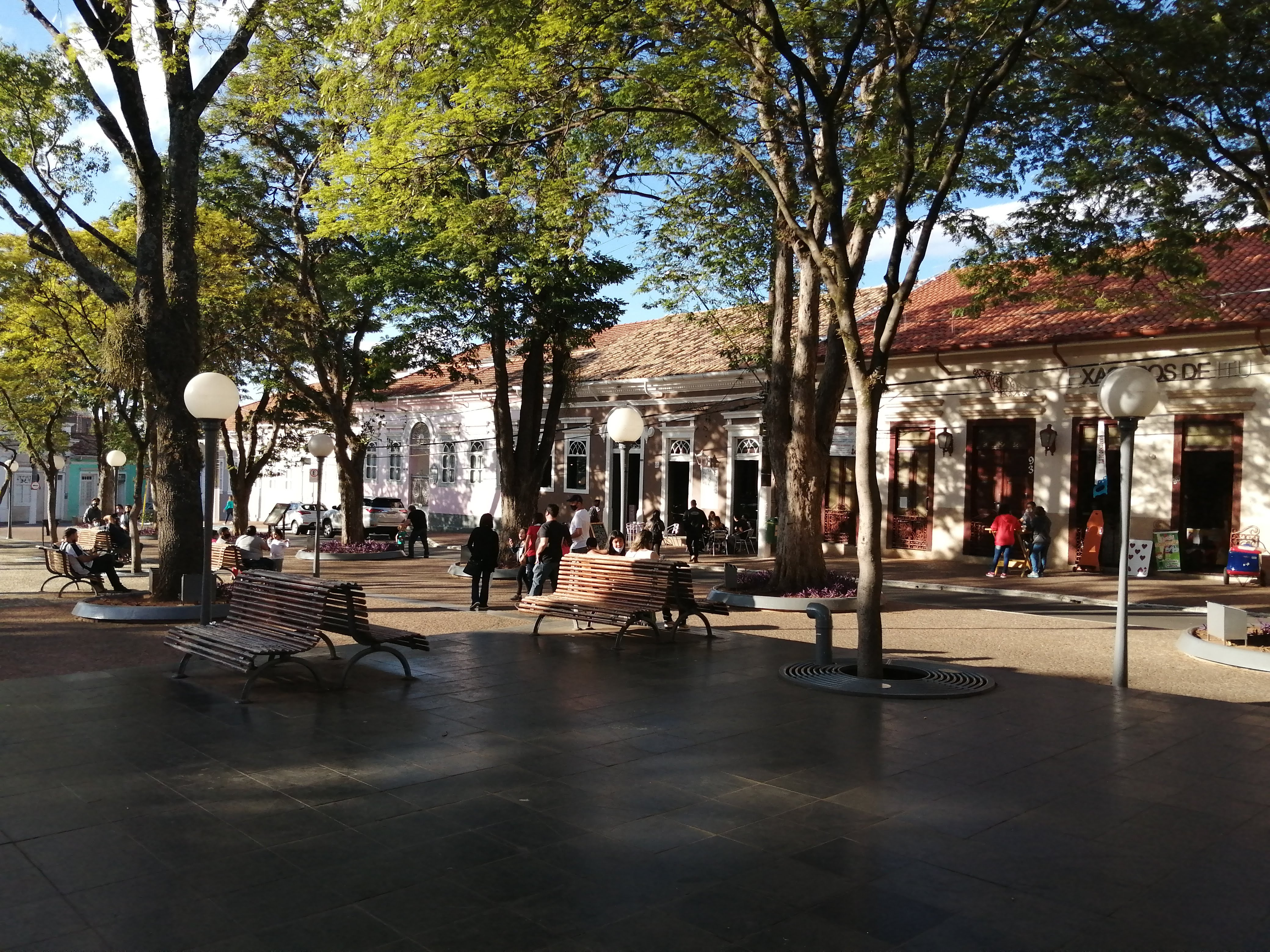
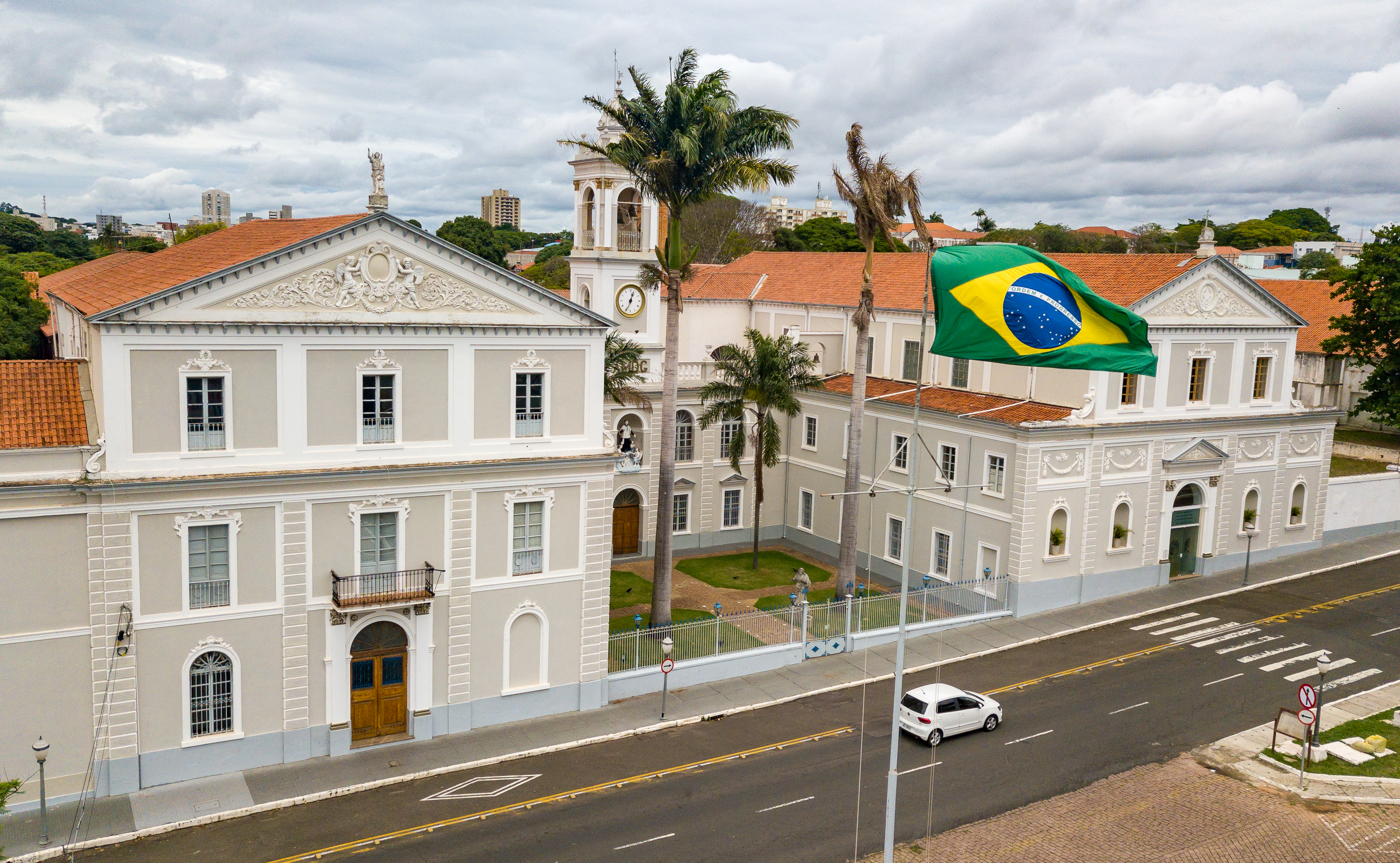
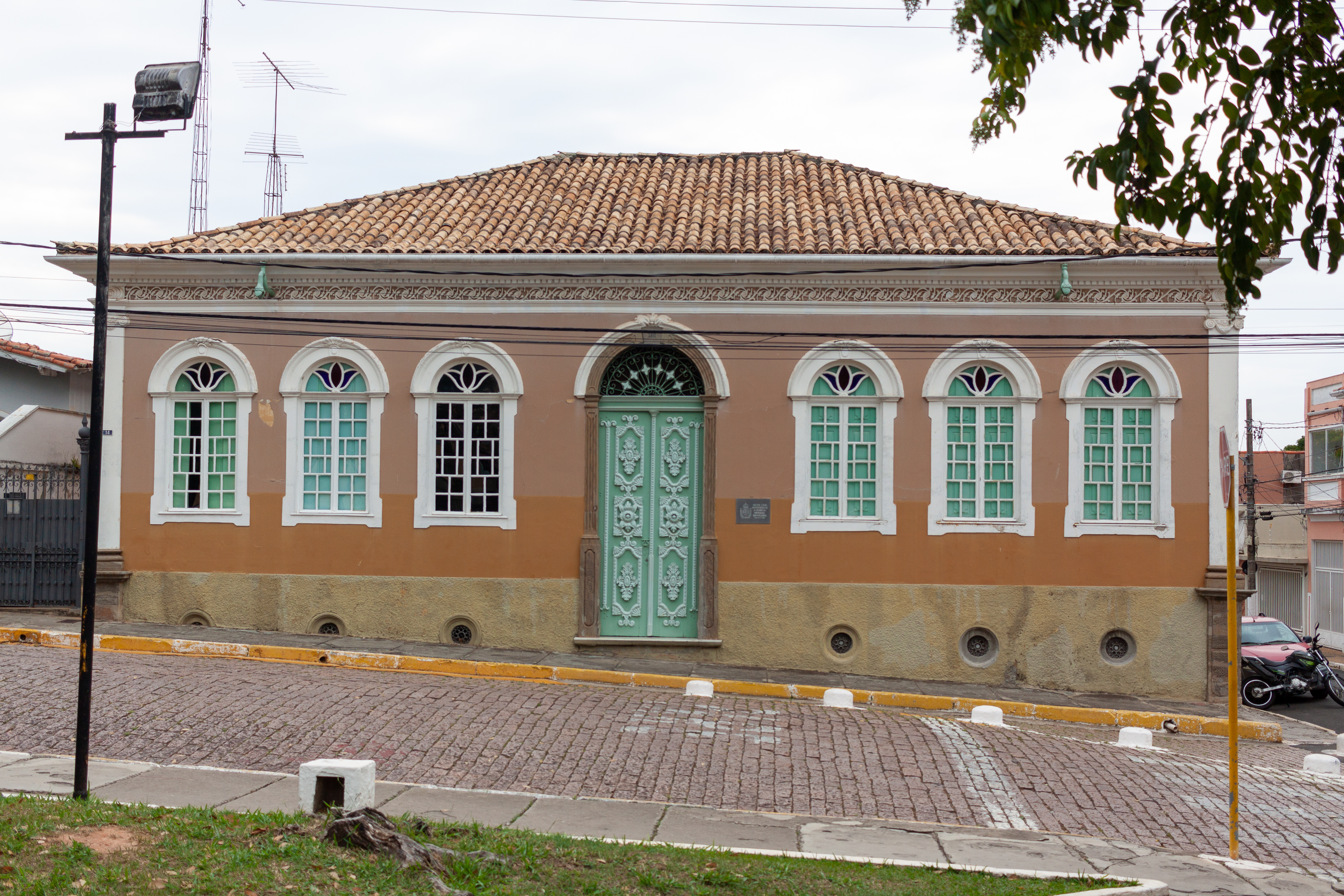
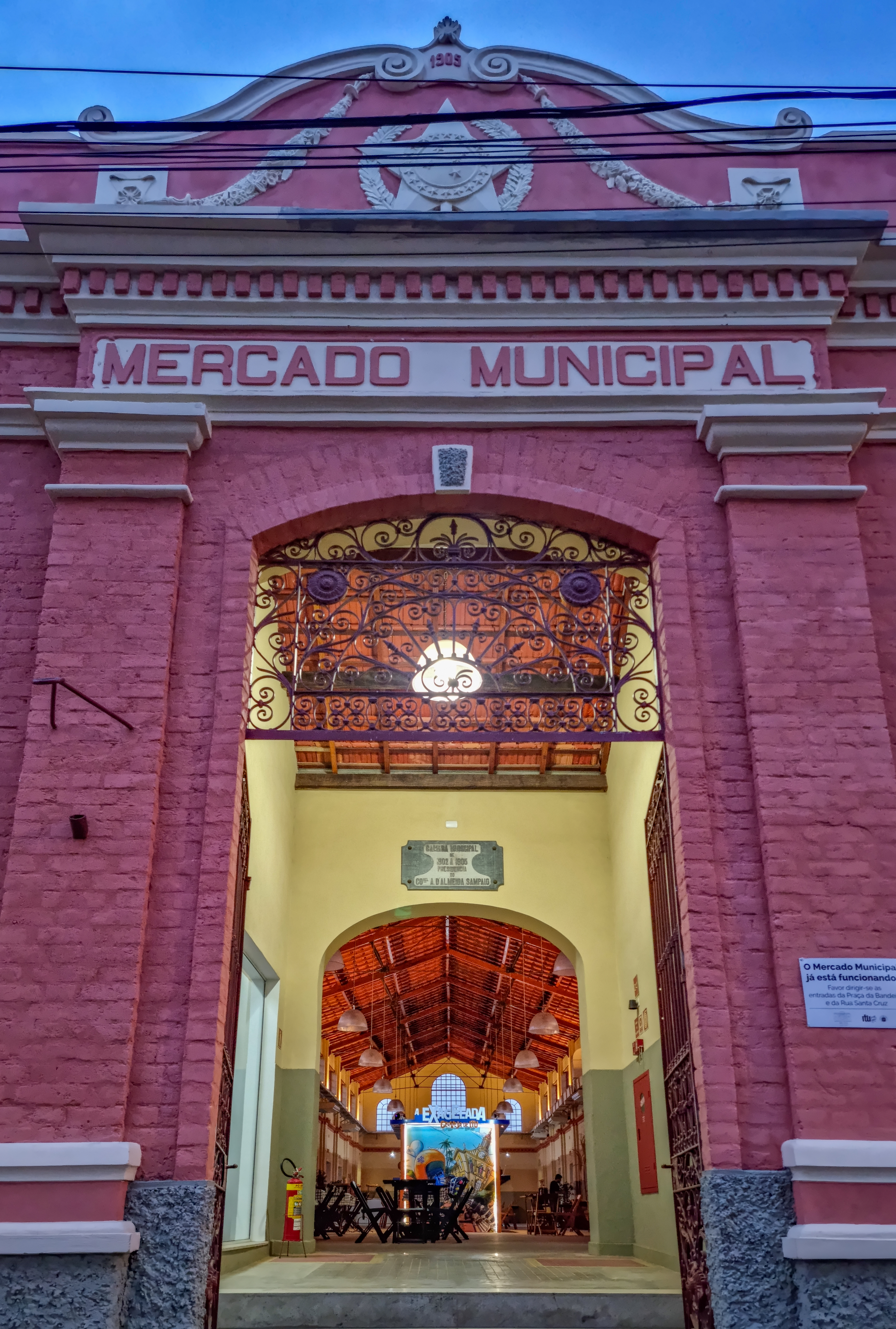
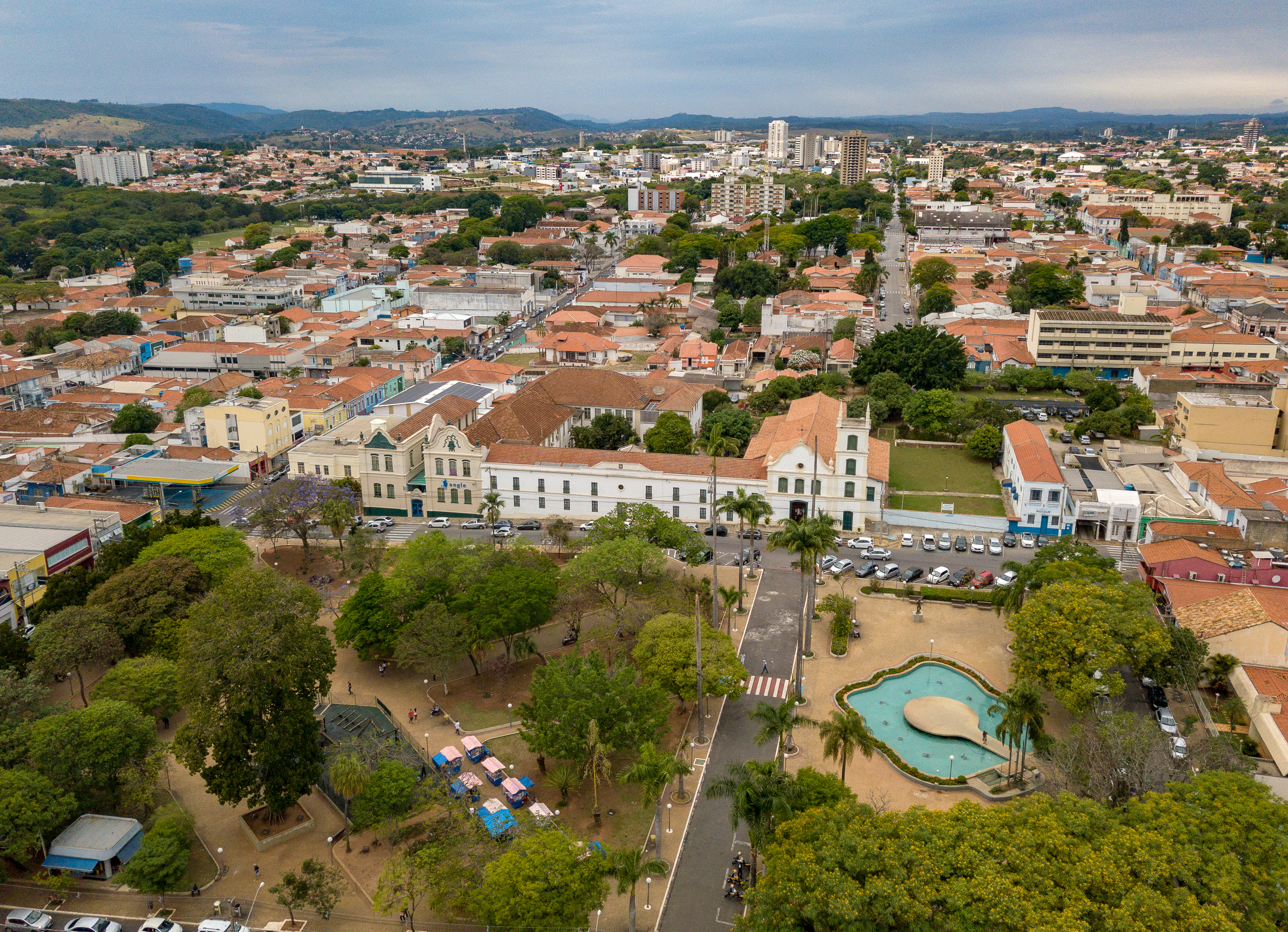
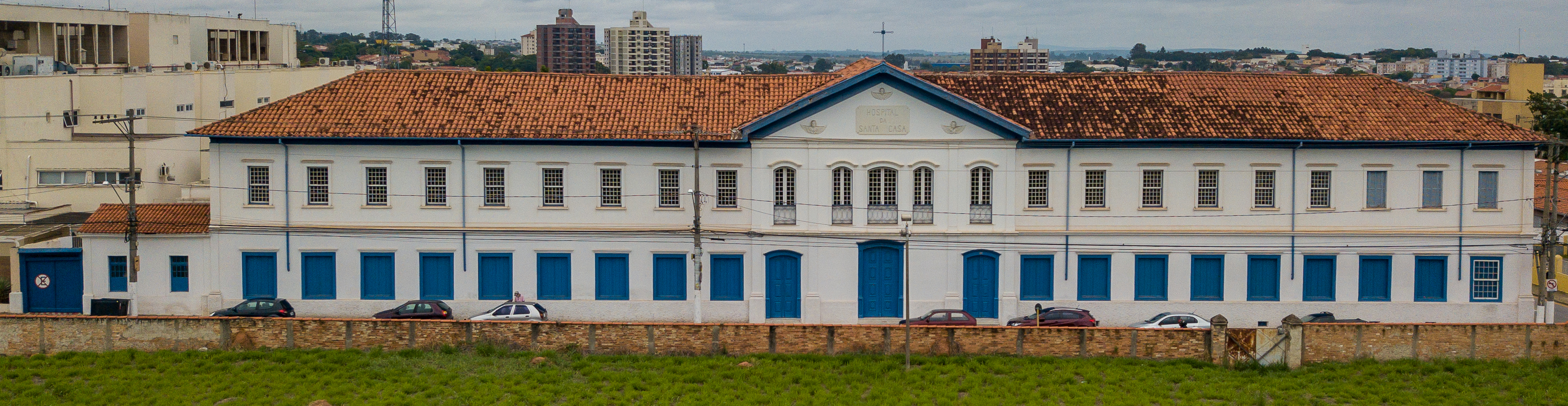

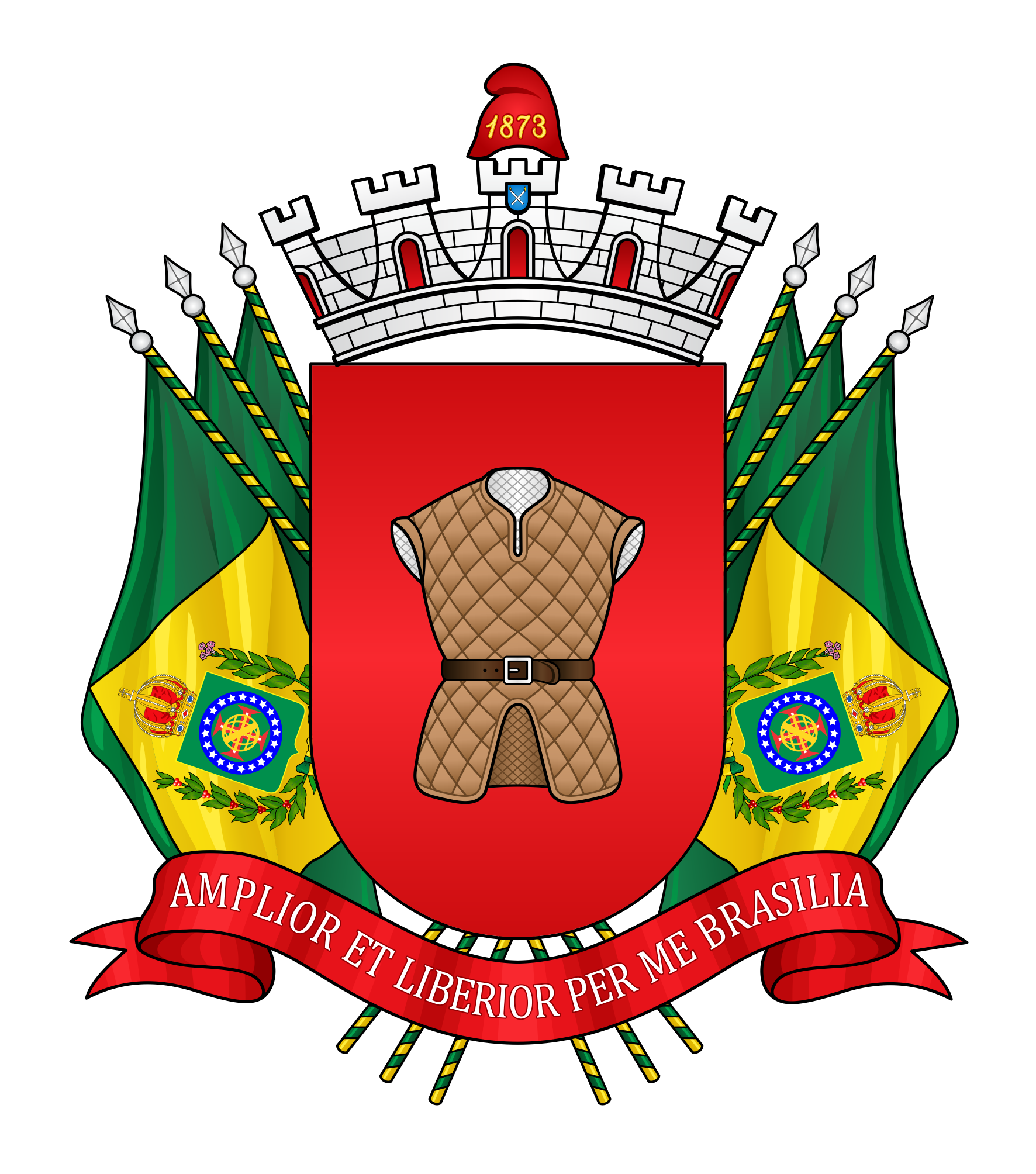
- Flag Coat of arms

- Location in São Paulo state

- Location in Brazil
- Coordinates: 23°15′51″S 47°17′57″W
- Country: Brazil
- Region: Southeast
- State: São Paulo
- Metrop. region: Sorocaba

Area
  - Total: 640.72 km^{2} (247.38 sq mi)
- Elevation: 583 m (1,913 ft)

Population (2022 Brazilian Census)
  - Total: 168,240
  - Estimate (2025): 175,047
  - Density: 262.58/km^{2} (680.08/sq mi)
- Time zone: UTC-03:00 (BRT)
  - Summer (DST): UTC-02:00 (BRST)
- Postal code: 13300
- Area code: +55 11
- HDI (2010): 0.773 – high
- Website: www.itu.sp.gov.br

Itu is a historic city and municipality in the state of São Paulo in Brazil. It is part of the Metropolitan Region of Sorocaba. The population was 168,240 as of 2022 Census, in an area of 640.72 km^{2}. The elevation is 583 m. This place name comes from the Tupi language, meaning big waterfall. Two rivers flow through Itu: Tietê and Jundiaí. Itu has five hospitals, eleven bank agencies and one shopping center, the Plaza Shopping Itu.

Itu was founded in 1610 by bandeirante Domingos Fernandes. It became a parish in 1653. In 1657, it was elevated to a town and municipality. It became a part of Brazil in 1822. It became a city in 1843.

It is the 46th most populous municipality in the state of São Paulo and the 174th in Brazil, in addition to being the second largest city in the Sorocaba Metropolitan Region, behind only Sorocaba.

== Geography ==
Its climate is predominantly subtropical, influenced by both its inland elevation and its proximity to seasonal monsoon patterns.

Summers are warm and rainy, with dense afternoon clouds that often gather over the nearby ridges before breaking into short, heavy downpours. Winters, by contrast, are cold and dry, and occasional frost settles in the sheltered valleys, lingering until the late morning sun reaches them.

The region occupies a transitional zone between the ancient crystalline plateau and the younger sedimentary basins. This mix gives rise to a patchwork of soils—thin, mineral-rich stretches alternating with softer alluvial layers—which in turn supports a varied landscape of scrub woodland, terraced fields, and scattered hamlets built along the natural contours of the terrain.

== Demographics ==
=== Population history ===
Year	Population
2001	135,366
2004	149,758
2009	157,384
2015	167,095

According to the 2000 IBGE Census, the population was 136,366, of which 123,942 are urban and 11,424 are rural. The average life expectancy was 71.53 years. The literacy rate was at 92.53%.

== Transportation ==
The main roads passing through the municipality are:

- SP-75
- SP-79
- SP-300
- SP-308
- SP-312

== Tourism ==
Itu was the birthplace of nationally-known comedian Simplicio, whose catchphrase was "back home in Itu everything is bigger". This led to the city becoming known as the "capital of large things", with a number of oversized objects being constructed there. The town's "exaggerations" include a 4m tall yellow pay phone called "orelhão", an oversized street light, a giant car tire (which was set on fire) and a mast decorated with a star, claimed to be the world's tallest artificial Christmas tree.

With the increase in domestic tourism the infrastructure soon developed to attract foreign visitors as well as international meetings, seminars and congress events. In 1999 and 2003 the Seventh Day Adventist Reform Movement held their international delegation session in Itu bringing people from over 80 countries to the city at each event.

== Media ==
In telecommunications, the city was served by Companhia Telefônica Brasileira until 1973, when it began to be served by Telecomunicações de São Paulo. In July 1998, this company was acquired by Telefónica, which adopted the Vivo brand in 2012.

The company is currently an operator of cell phones, fixed lines, internet (fiber optics/4G) and television (satellite and cable).

== Notable people ==
- Marcelo Chierighini, swimmer
- Ronaldo Mota Sardenberg (born 1940) is a Brazilian diplomat, at the United Nations (2003–2007), and politician

== Sister cities - twin towns ==
Itu is twinned with:

Salto, Brazil

== Gallery ==
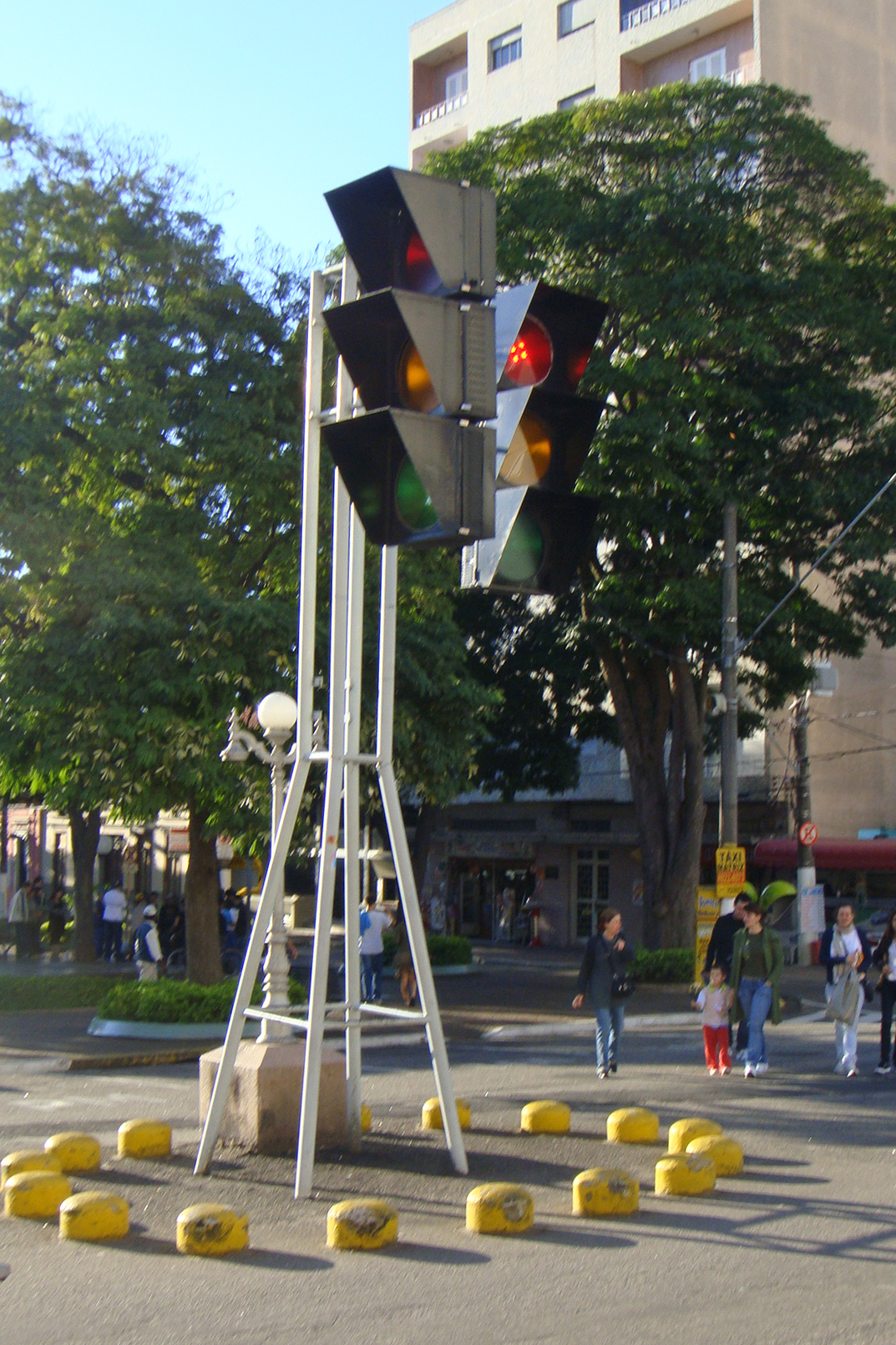
Giant traffic signal. Itu is known as the capital of "large things"

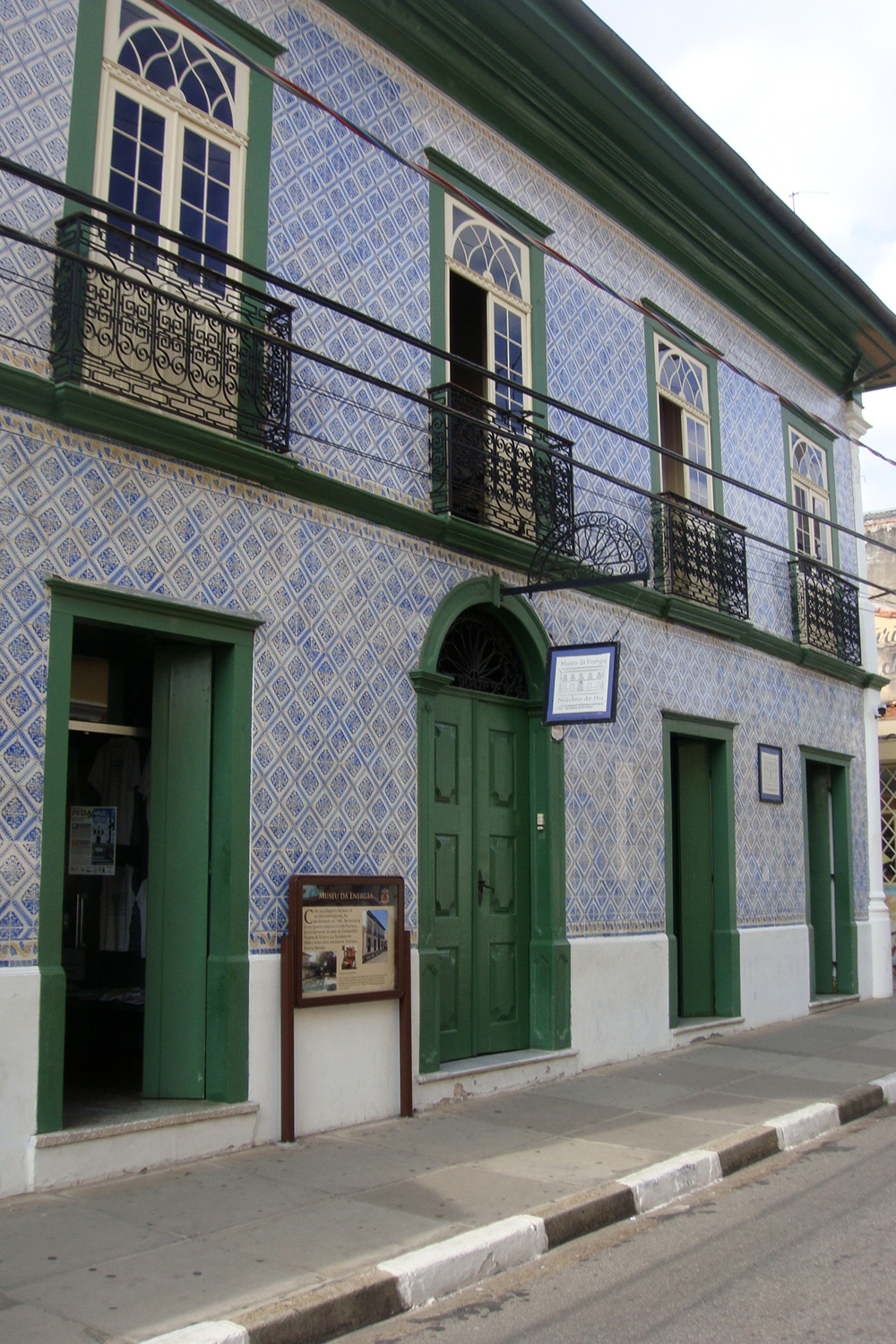
Energy Museum

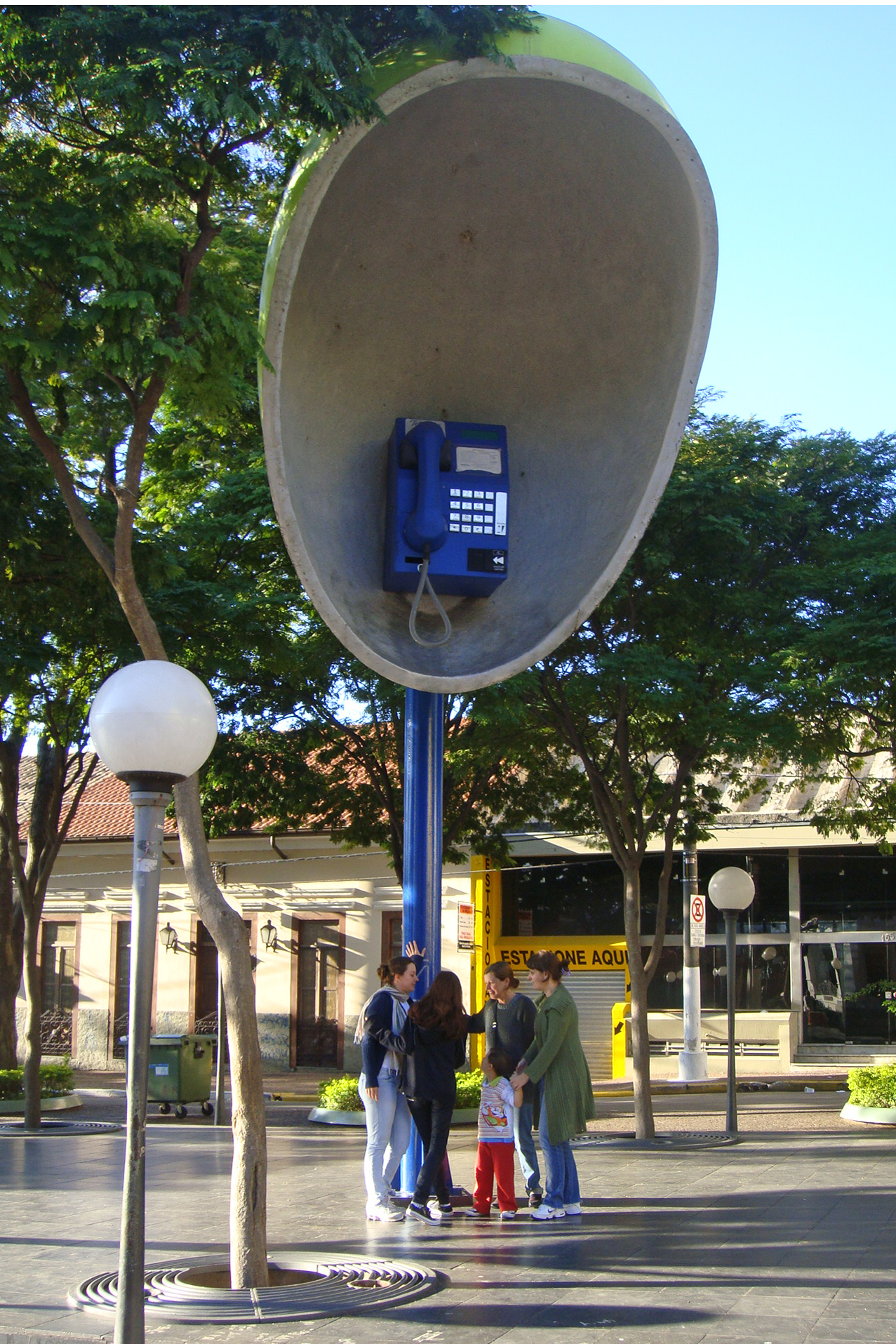
Giant public pay phone. Itu is known as the capital of "large things"

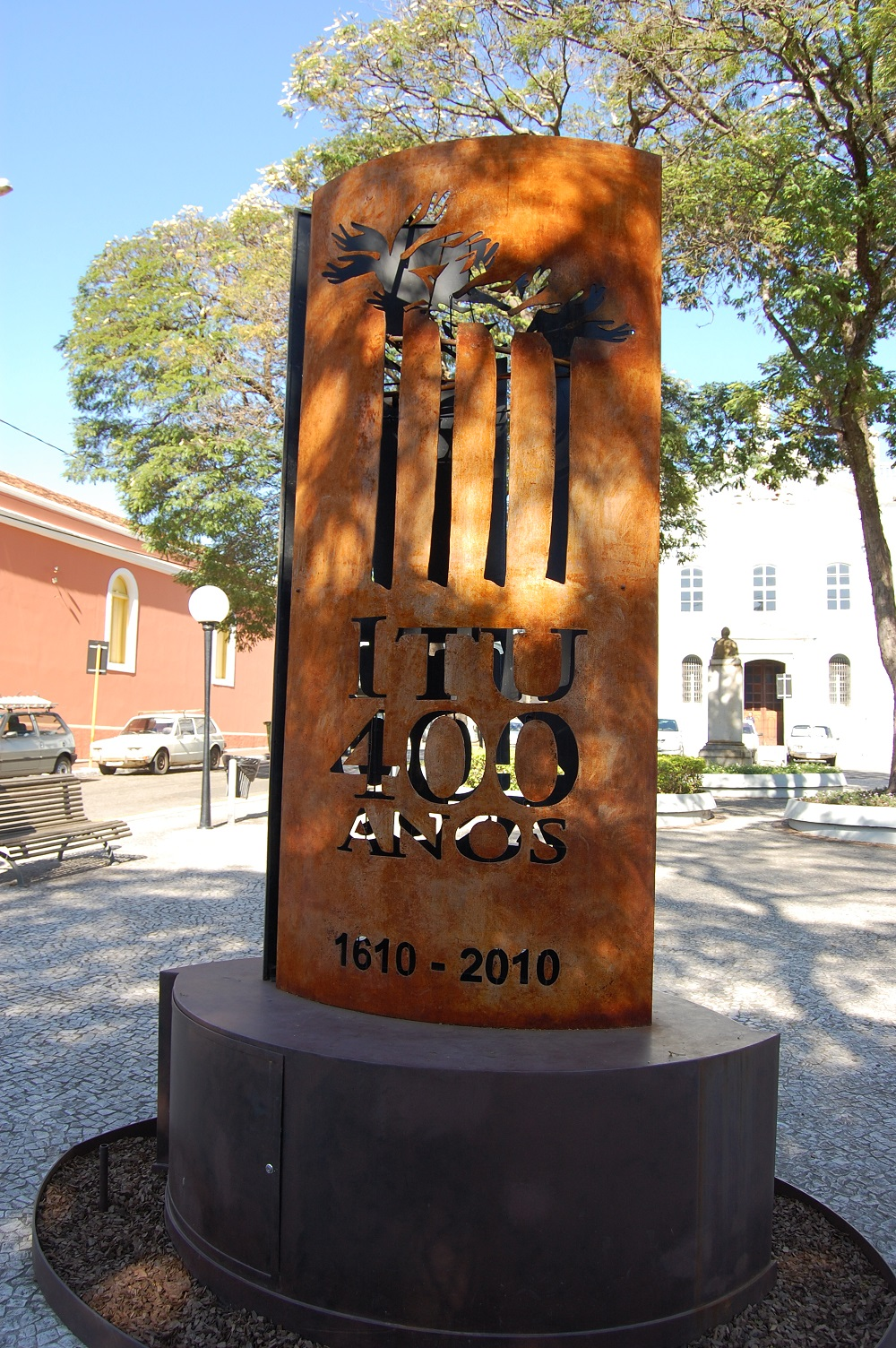
Itu celebrated its 400th birthday in 2010.

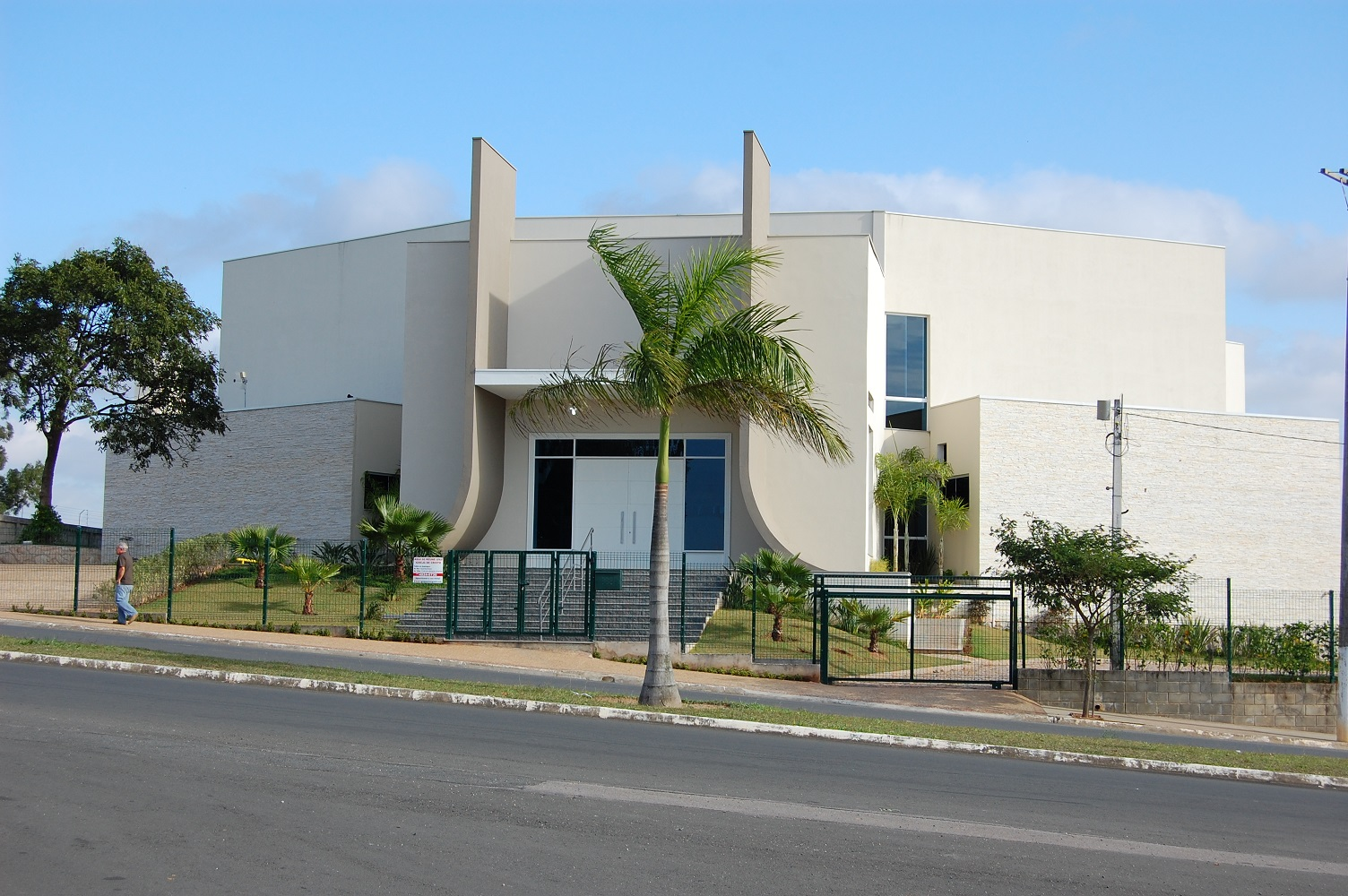
Igreja de Cristo (Church of Christ)

== See also ==
- List of municipalities in São Paulo
- Primo Schincariol
- Interior of São Paulo
