= Sorocaba River =

Coordinates: 22°58′56″S 47°48′24″W

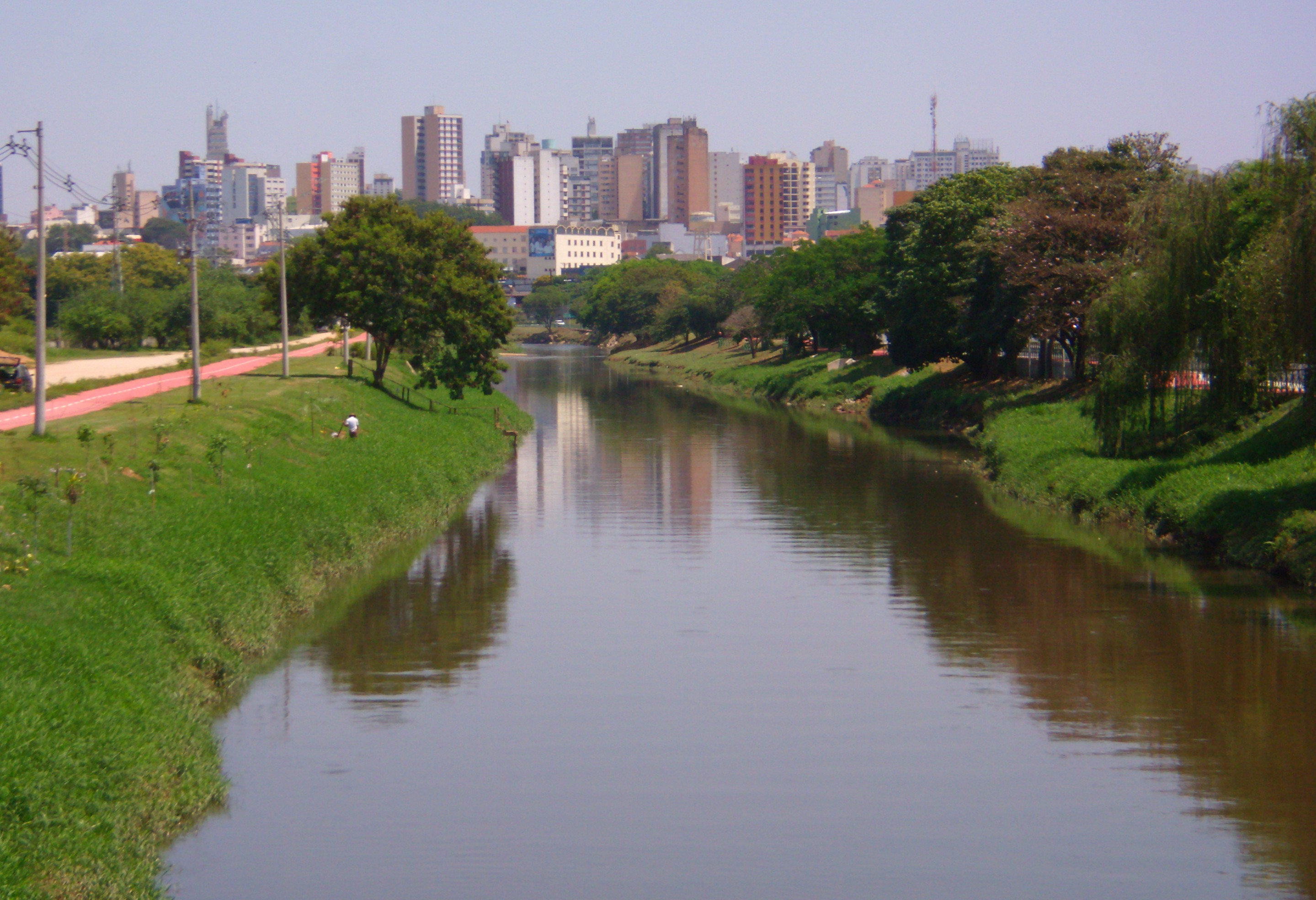

Location
- Country: Brazil

Physical characteristics
- Source
  - location: São Paulo state
  - elevation: 1,000 m (3,300 ft)
- Mouth
  - location: Tietê River
  - elevation: 467 m (1,532 ft)
- Length: 227 km (141 mi)
- Basin size: 5,296 km^{2} (2,045 sq mi)
- Discharge
  - average: 13 m^{3}/s (460 cu ft/s)

The Sorocaba River (Portuguese, Rio Sorocaba) is a river of São Paulo state in southeastern Brazil. It is a tributary of the Tietê River. The river runs large and important part of the municipality of Sorocaba.

== Geography ==
Sorocaba headwaters are located in the municipalities of Ibiúna, Cotia, Vargem Grande Paulista and São Roque. It occupies a drainage area of 5,269 km² and covers a distance of 180 km rural area flowing into Tiete River, in the municipality of Laranjal Paulista. The upper portion of the high Sorocaba is located on the Atlantic Plateau, where crystalline rocks dominate. From Sorocaba to its mouth is in Peripheral Depression in the domain of sedimentary rocks from Parana Basin Tubarão Supergroup.

It is one of the principal rivers of the state of São Paulo and considered the largest and main tributary of the left bank of the river Tietê, has 180 km long straight and 227 km, considering his bed in his natural path. It is bordered by the following cities: Ibiúna, Votorantim, Sorocaba, Iperó, Boituva, Tatuí, Cerquilho, Jumirim and Laranjal Paulista. Its flow is regulated to 13 m³/s.

=== Tributaries ===
The main tributaries of the Sorocaba are the rivers Sarapuí, Pirapora, Ipanema, and Tatuí Pirajibú.

== Management ==
The Watershed Committee of the Sorocaba River and Middle Tiete - CBH-SMT was formed in 1994. It is a collegiate body with an advisory and deliberative of the Integrated Water Resources Management - working on Unit Water Resources Management 10, built by the state, municipalities and civil society, equally. This committee took the initiative of civil society and currently includes 34 municipalities, 18 were located in Sorocaba River basin and 16 situated in the sub-basin of the upper Middle Tietê.

== Environment ==
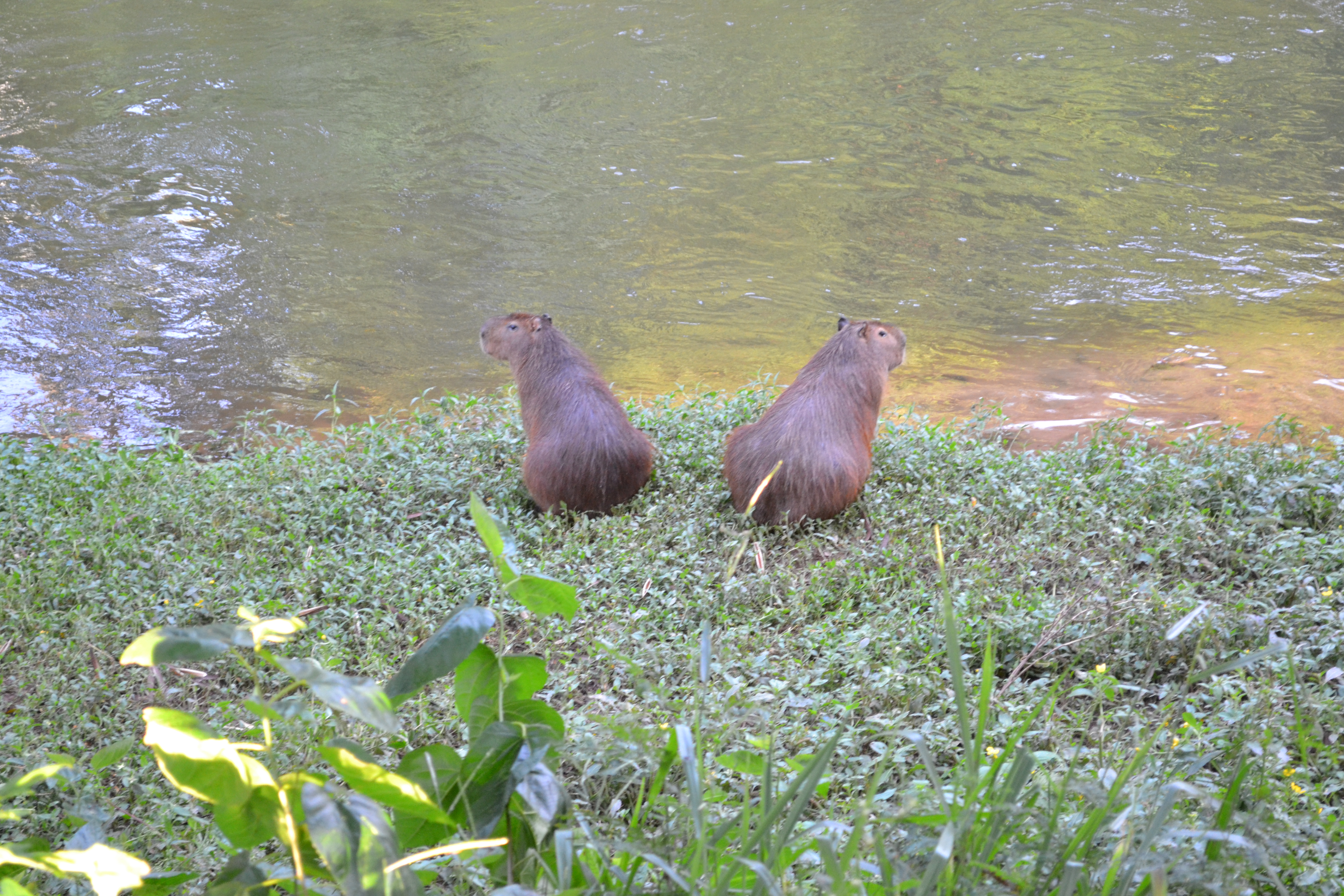
Capibaras on the river banks (Votorantim)

It has been a very polluted river due to industrial activities, mining, sewage without treatment, etc. With the awareness that occurred after the 1980s, there was greater commitment from the municipalities of the watershed in the conservation of water sources through environmental laws. This effort is evident when one observes an improvement in the appearance of the river crossing the urban area of Sorocaba.

== See also ==
- Itupararanga Dam
- Sorocaba
- List of rivers of São Paulo
- Tributaries of the Río de la Plata
