= SP-97 (São Paulo highway) =

Highway in the state of São Paulo

SP-097

Route information
- Length: 25.460 km (15.820 mi)

Location
- Country: Brazil
- State: São Paulo

Highway system
- Highways in Brazil; Federal; São Paulo State Highways

SP-97 is a state highway in the state of São Paulo in Brazil.
