= SP-308 (São Paulo highway) =

State highway in São Paulo, Brazil

SP-308

Route information
- Length: 114.260 km (70.998 mi)

Location
- Country: Brazil
- State: São Paulo

Highway system
- Highways in Brazil; Federal; São Paulo State Highways

SP-308 is a state highway in the state of São Paulo in Brazil.
