= Ibiúna =

- Municipality
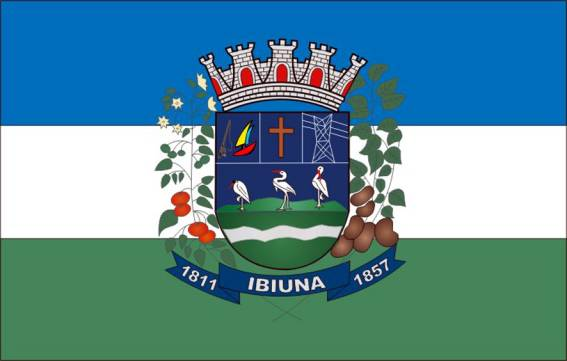
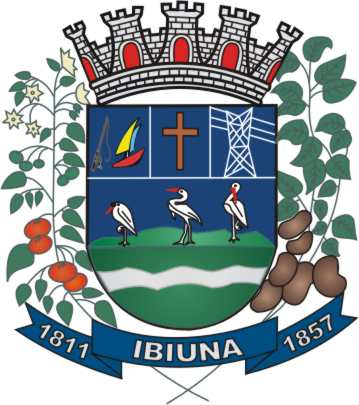
- Flag Coat of arms

- Location in São Paulo state

- Location in Brazil
- Coordinates: 23°39′23″S 47°13′21″W
- Country: Brazil
- Region: Southeast Brazil
- State: São Paulo
- Metropolitan Region: Sorocaba
- Motto: A agricultura é nosso forte (Agriculture is our strength)
- Demonym: ibiunense
- Founded: March 24, 1857

Government
  - Mayor: João Benedicto de Mello Neto (PSDB)

Area
  - Total: 1,058.08 km^{2} (408.53 sq mi)
- Elevation: 860 m (2,820 ft)

Population (2020)
  - Total: 79,479
  - Density: 75.116/km^{2} (194.55/sq mi)
- Time zone: UTC−3 (BRT)
- Website: www.ibiuna.com.br

Ibiúna is a municipality in the state of São Paulo in Brazil. It is part of the Metropolitan Region of Sorocaba. The population is 79,479 (2020 est.) in an area of 1058.08 km^{2}. The elevation is 860 m.

== Geography ==
Located in the middle of a valley, its main economical activity/resources are provided from agriculture (developed by the hundreds of Japanese immigrants established there) and the city has been recently turned to a tourist city a few years ago. The whole Ibiuna territory encompasses rainforests, bushes, and hundreds of kilometers of native vegetation and wildlife.

The municipality contains part of the 488,865-hectare (1,208,010-acre) Serra do Mar Environmental Protection Area, created in 1984. It also contains part of the 26,250-hectare (64,900-acre) Jurupará State Park, created in 1992.

== Demography ==
Historical population (municipality)
| Year | Population | %± |
|---|---|---|
| 1920 | 10,960 |
| 1940 | 12,423 | 13.3% |
| 1950 | 18,072 | 45.5% |
| 1960 | 23,671 | 31.0% |
| 1970 | 24,391 | 3.0% |
| 1980 | 31,826 | 30.5% |
| 1991 | 49,187 | 54.5% |
| 2000 | 64,384 | 30.9% |
| 2010 | 71,217 | 10.6% |
| 2022 | 75,605 | 6.2% |

=== People ===
The population is mostly situated outside the metropolitan area (15,000 inhabitants in the city and approximately 65,000 in the suburbs) and is a mix of Portuguese Colonialists descendants, Italians, Germans and Africans — as mostly any part of the country, Ibiuna is a mix of races and cultures. Once a year, the city held the famous "São Sebastian festival" party celebrated for nearly a century to reaffirm the faith of town's divine intervention by St. Sebastian during a Spanish influenza epidemic (the celebration occurs every year during the last weekend of May).

== Media ==
In telecommunications, the city was served by Companhia de Telecomunicações do Estado de São Paulo until 1975, when it began to be served by Telecomunicações de São Paulo. In July 1998, this company was acquired by Telefónica, which adopted the Vivo brand in 2012.

The company is currently an operator of cell phones, fixed lines, internet (fiber optics/4G) and television (satellite and cable).

== Religion ==
Christianity is present in the city as follows:

=== Catholic Church ===
The Catholic church in the municipality is part of the Diocese of Osasco.

=== Protestant Church ===
The most diverse evangelical beliefs are present in the city, mainly Pentecostal, including the Assemblies of God in Brazil (the largest evangelical church in the country), Christian Congregation in Brazil, among others. These denominations are growing more and more throughout Brazil.

== See also ==
- List of municipalities in São Paulo
- Interior of São Paulo
