= 2014–15 OK Liga =

- League: OK Liga
- Sport: Roller hockey
- Duration: 20 September 2014–16 May 2015
- Number of teams: 16
- League champions: FC Barcelona
- Runners-up: Liceo
- Top scorer: Josep Lamas, 54 goals
- Relegated to Primera División: Manlleu, MIS Ibérica Mataró & Tordera

OK Liga seasons
- ← 2013–14 2015–16 →

The 2014–15 season of the OK Liga is the 46th season of top-tier rink hockey in Spain.

FC Barcelona won its twenty-sixth title in their history, winning 28 matches, and losing only one.

== Teams ==
OK Liga 2014–15 teams
Catalonia

Team	Arena	Capacity	City/Area
Liceo	Pazo dos Deportes	5,000	A Coruña, Galicia
FC Barcelona	Palau Blaugrana	7,585	Barcelona
Moritz Vendrell	Pavelló Municipal	308	El Vendrell
Reus Deportiu	Pavelló del Reus Deportiu	2,500	Reus
Vic	Pavelló Olímpic	3,000	Vic
Noia Freixenet	Pavelló Olímpic	1,500	Sant Sadurní d'Anoia
ICG Software Lleida	Onze de Setembre	2,200	Lleida
Voltregà	Victorià Oliveras de la Riva	1,000	Sant Hipòlit de Voltregà
Monbús Igualada	Les Comes	3,000	Igualada
Calafell Tot l'Any	Joan Ortoll	600	Calafell
HockeyGlobal Cerceda	Presidente González Laxe	500	Cerceda, Galicia
Tordera	Pavelló Parroquial	800	Tordera
Vilafranca Capital del Vi	Pavelló d'Hoquei	1,000	Vilafranca del Penedès
Enrile Alcoy	Francisco Laporta	3,500	Alcoy, Valencian Community
Manlleu	Pavelló Municipal	1,000	Manlleu
MIS Ibérica Mataró	Jaume Parera	700	Mataró

== Standings ==
Pos	Team	Pld	W	D	L	GF	GA	GD	Pts	Qualification or relegation
1	FC Barcelona	30	28	1	1	163	54	+109	85	European League
2	Liceo	30	24	2	4	168	90	+78	74	European League
3	Moritz Vendrell	30	17	5	8	123	111	+12	56	European League
4	Vic	30	16	5	9	117	85	+32	53	European League
5	Reus Deportiu	30	16	3	11	114	103	+11	51	CERS Cup
6	HockeyGlobal Cerceda	30	13	9	8	117	120	−3	48	CERS Cup
7	Voltregà	30	11	8	11	96	87	+9	41	CERS Cup
8	Vilafranca Capital del Vi	30	11	8	11	100	108	−8	41	CERS Cup
9	Enrile Alcoy	30	11	5	14	105	131	−26	38	CERS Cup
10	Monbús Igualada	30	10	6	14	94	94	0	36	
11	ICG Software Lleida	30	9	7	14	107	117	−10	34	
12	Calafell Tot l'Any	30	9	5	16	85	116	−31	32	
13	Noia Freixenet	30	8	6	16	80	106	−26	30	
14	Manlleu	30	7	6	17	77	104	−27	27	Relegated
15	MIS Ibérica Mataró	30	8	2	20	99	130	−31	26	Relegated
16	Tordera	30	2	2	26	74	163	−89	8	Relegated

== Top goalscorers ==
#	Player	Goals	Team
1	(Spain) Josep Lamas	54	Liceo
2	(Argentina) Pablo Álvarez	38	FC Barcelona
2	(Spain) Martí Casas	38	MIS Ibérica Mataró
4	(Spain) Ferran Formatjé	36	Enrile Alcoy
4	(Spain) Antonio Pérez	36	Liceo

== Copa del Rey ==
2017 Copa del Rey
Tournament details
- Arena: Ciutat Esportiva, Blanes
- Dates: 26 February–1 March 2015

Final positions
- Champions: CP Vic (4th title)
- Runners-up: FC Barcelona

Awards and statistics
- MVP: (Spain) Carles Grau

The 2015 Copa del Rey was the 72nd edition of the Spanish men's roller hockey cup. It was played at the Pavelló d'Esports de Reus between the eight first qualified teams after the first half of the season.

CP Vic won its 4th cup.

=== Bracket ===
Quarter-finals
1	FC Barcelona	3
8	Enrile PAS Alcoy	2
4	Reus Deportiu	2
5	Voltregà	4
2	Liceo	8
7	HockeyGlobal Cerceda	1
3	Vic	6
6	Moritz Vendrell	3

Semi-finals
1	FC Barcelona	4
5	Voltregà	3
2	Liceo	1
3	Vic	2

Final
1	FC Barcelona	1
3	Vic	2

=== Quarter-finals ===
February 26, 2015	Liceo	8–1	HockeyGlobal Cerceda	Blanes
18:30 (UTC+1)	J Lamas 2'; T Pérez 4'; Bargalló 6', 31'; Vives 15', 48'; Carballeira 22'; E Lamas 38'	Report	Grasas 12'	Stadium: Ciutat Esportiva Blanes; Referee: Mayor Oliván, Ribó Navarro

February 26, 2015	Vic	6–3	Moritz Vendrell	Blanes
21:00 (UTC+1)	Torres 18', 28', 31'; C Rodríguez 34'; Font 46'; Ordeig 47'	Report	Miras 7'; Mitjans 9', 48'	Stadium: Ciutat Esportiva Blanes; Referee: González González, Garrote Arcelús

February 27, 2015	FC Barcelona	3–2	Enrile PAS Alcoy	Blanes
18:30 (UTC+1)	P Álvarez 1'; Pascual 8'; Panadero 47'	Report	Cañellas 6'; Formatjé 49'	Stadium: Ciutat Esportiva Blanes; Referee: Fernández García, Tavera Bellido

February 27, 2015	Reus Deportiu	2–4	Voltregà	Blanes
21:00 (UTC+1)	À Rodríguez 1'; Vargas 7', 37'; D Rodríguez 29'	Report	Coy 14'; Selva 34'	Stadium: Ciutat Esportiva Blanes; Referee: Gómez Sánchez, Veiga Martínez

=== Semifinals ===
February 28, 2015	Liceo	1–2 (a.e.t.)	Vic	Blanes
19:30 (UTC+1)	Carballeira 24'	Report	Font 37', 53'	Stadium: Ciutat Esportiva Blanes; Referee: Valverde Munuera, Gómez Sánchez

February 28, 2015	FC Barcelona	4–3	Voltregà	Blanes
21:45 (UTC+1)	Gual 1', 38'; P Álvarez 6'; Barroso 15'	Report	T Gómez 14', 45'; À Rodríguez 26'	Stadium: Ciutat Esportiva Blanes; Referee: García Romero, Melero López

=== Final ===
March 1, 2015	Vic	2–1	FC Barcelona	Blanes
15:00 (UTC+1)	Font 24'; Torres 27'	Report	Panadero 31'	Stadium: Ciutat Esportiva Blanes; Referee: Sandoval Santos, Sanz Rodríguez
