= 2012–13 OK Liga =

- League: OK Liga
- Sport: Roller hockey
- Duration: October 2012–June 15, 2013
- Teams: 16
- League champions: Coinasa Liceo
- Runners-up: FC Barcelona
- Top scorer: Raül Pelicano, 44 goals
- Relegated to Primera División: Fergo Aisa Sant Feliu & Enrile PAS Alcoy

OK Liga seasons
- ← 2011–12 2013–14 →

The 2012–13 season of the OK Liga was the 44th season of top-tier rink hockey in Spain.

Coinasa Liceo won the championship by a single point difference. It was its seventh overall title and the first since 1992–93 season.

== Teams ==
OK Liga 2012–13 teams
Catalonia

Team	Stadium	Capacity	City/Area
Calafell Tot l'Any	Joan Ortoll	600	Calafell
Coinasa Liceo	Pazo dos Deportes	5,000	A Coruña
Enrile PAS Alcoy	Francisco Laporta	3,500	Alcoy, Valencian Community
FC Barcelona	Palau Blaugrana	7,585	Barcelona
Fergo Aisa Sant Feliu	Francesc Cassart Roca	500	Sant Feliu de Codines
ICG Software Lleida	Onze de Setembre	2,200	Lleida
Igualada	Les Comes	3,000	Igualada
Lloret	Pavelló Municipal	1,140	Lloret de Mar
Mopesa Vilanova	Pavelló d'Esports	860	Vilanova i la Geltrú
Moritz Vendrell	Pavelló Municipal	308	El Vendrell
Muralla Òptica Blanes	Pavelló Municipal	700	Blanes
Noia Freixenet	Pavelló Olímpic	1,500	Sant Sadurní d'Anoia
Reus Deportiu	Palau d'Esports	2,500	Reus
SHUM Grupo Maestre	Pavelló Poliesportiu	965	Maçanet de la Selva
Vic	Pavelló Olímpic	3,000	Vic
Voltregà	Victorià Oliveras de la Riva	1,000	Sant Hipòlit de Voltregà

== Standings ==
Pos	Team	Pld	W	D	L	GF	GA	GD	Pts	Qualification or relegation
1	Coinasa Liceo	30	24	4	2	160	80	+80	76	European League
2	FC Barcelona	30	24	3	3	155	59	+96	75	European League
3	Moritz Vendrell	30	19	2	9	127	95	+32	59	European League
4	Reus Deportiu	30	17	3	10	144	112	+32	54	European League
5	Vic	30	15	7	8	109	73	+36	52	CERS Cup
6	Noia Freixenet	30	14	5	11	103	104	−1	47	CERS Cup
7	ICG Software Lleida	30	13	4	13	103	112	−9	43	CERS Cup
8	Voltregà	30	12	3	15	96	104	−8	39	CERS Cup
9	Igualada	30	12	3	15	107	115	−8	39	CERS Cup
10	Lloret	30	11	4	15	130	130	0	37	
11	Mopesa Vilanova	30	11	1	18	115	154	−39	34	
12	Muralla Óptica Blanes	30	9	7	14	94	101	−7	34	
13	Calafell Tot l'Any	30	9	6	15	98	126	−28	33	
14	SHUM Grupo Maestre	30	10	3	17	95	125	−30	33	Relegated
15	Fergo Aisa Sant Feliu	30	6	4	20	79	140	−61	22	Relegated
16	Enrile-PAS-Alcoy	30	4	1	25	70	155	−85	13	Relegated

Source: Federación Española de Patinaje

2012–13 OK Liga winners
(Galicia (Spain))
Coinasa Liceo
Seventh title

== Top goal scorers ==
Player	Goals	Team
(Spain) Raül Pelicano	44	CH Lloret
(Spain) Josep Maria Selva	41	Moritz Vendrell
(Spain) Marc Torra	40	FC Barcelona
(Spain) Francesc Bargalló	40	Muralla Óptica Blanes
(Spain) Jordi Bargalló	39	Coinasa Liceo

== Copa del Rey ==
2013 Copa del Rey
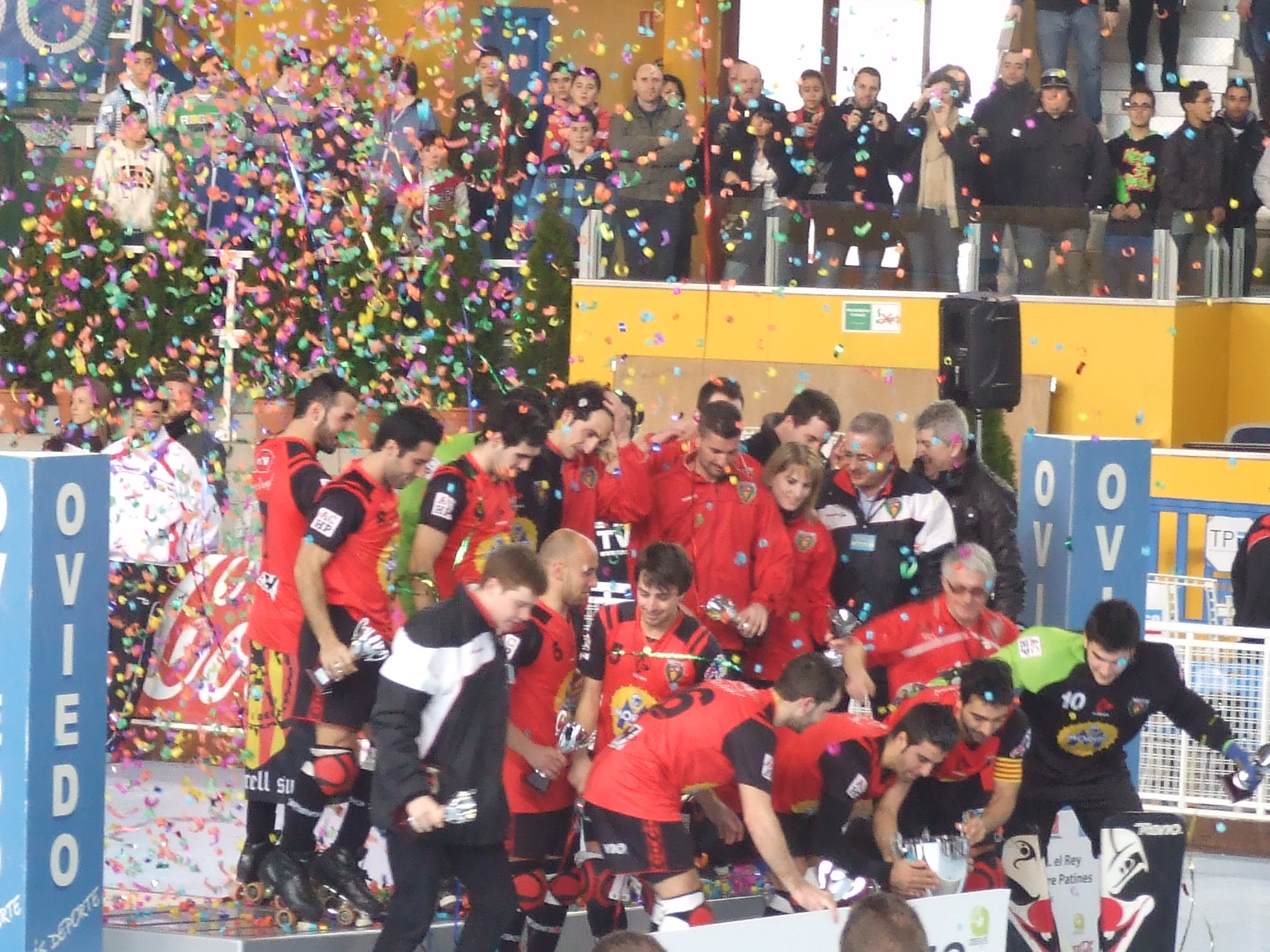
- Moritz Vendrell players celebrate the club's first title.

Tournament details
- Arena: Palacio de los Deportes, Oviedo
- Dates: 28 February–3 March 2013

Final positions
- Champions: Moritz Vendrell (1st title)
- Runners-up: Reus Deportiu

Awards and statistics
- MVP: (Spain) Xavier Costa

The 2013 Copa del Rey was the 70th edition of the Spanish men's roller hockey cup. It was played in Oviedo between the eight first qualified teams after the first half of the season.

Moritz Vendrell won its first title ever.

Quarter-finals
1	Coinasa Liceo	7
6	ICG Software Lleida	3
4	Vic	3
5	Reus Deportiu	5
2	FC Barcelona	7
8	Igualada	1
3	Moritz Vendrell	3
7	Mopesa Vilanova	2

Semi-finals
1	Coinasa Liceo	2 (1)
5	Reus Deportiu	2 (2)
2	FC Barcelona	3
3	Moritz Vendrell	7

Final
5	Reus Deportiu	3
3	Moritz Vendrell	4

=== Quarter-finals ===
February 28, 2013	ICG Software Lleida	3 – 7	Coinasa Liceo	Palacio de los Deportes, Oviedo
19:00 (UTC+1)	Rodero 10'; Raballo 17' (pen.); Soler 33'	Report	Bargalló 3', 7' (pen.), 42'; Toni Pérez 5', 49'; Lamas 11'; Pascual 49'	Referee: Garmendia Cano, Garrote Arcelús

February 28, 2013	Reus Deportiu	5 – 3	Vic	Palacio de los Deportes, Oviedo
21:00 (UTC+1)	Marín 3', 14', 39'; Casanovas 8'; Ollé 42'	Report	Roca 18'; Molera 21'; Rocasalbas 33'	Referee: Valverde Munuera, Ribó Navarro

March 1, 2013	Mopesa Vilanova	2 – 3	Moritz Vendrell	Palacio de los Deportes, Oviedo
19:00 (UTC+1)	Ferrer 10'; Gil 37'	Report	Costa 32', 37' (pen.); Albesa 42'	Referee: Gómez Sánchez, Mayor Oliván

March 1, 2013	Igualada	1 – 7	FC Barcelona	Palacio de los Deportes, Oviedo
21:00 (UTC+1)	Povedano 23'	Report	Álvarez 17', 47', 50'; Torra 21'; Gual 22'; García 23'; Ordeig 34'	Referee: García Romero, Fernández García

=== Semifinals ===
March 2, 2013	Coinasa Liceo	2 – 2 (a.e.t.) (1 – 2 p)	Reus Deportiu	Palacio de los Deportes, Oviedo
18:45 (UTC+1)	Bargalló 3'; Ordóñez 42'	Report	Marín 29'; Adroher 34'	Referee: Galán García, Mayor Oliván

March 2, 2013	Moritz Vendrell	7 – 3	FC Barcelona	Palacio de los Deportes, Oviedo
20:45 (UTC+1)	Albesa 7', 13'; Costa 10', 41', 48', 48'; Selva 25' (pen.)	Report	Álvarez 15', 36'; Gual 35'	Referee: García Romero, Valverde Munuera

=== Final ===
March 3, 2013	Reus Deportiu	3 – 4 (a.e.t.)	Moritz Vendrell	Palacio de los Deportes, Oviedo
12:45 (UTC+1)	Rubio 21'; Marín 33'; Salvat 44'	Report	Selva 28'; Costa 47'; Albesa 49'; Barroso 53'	Referee: Melero López, Garrote Arcelús
