= 2011–12 OK Liga =

- League: OK Liga
- Sport: Roller hockey
- Duration: October 2011–June 16, 2012
- Number of teams: 14
- League champions: FC Barcelona
- Runners-up: Coinasa Liceo
- Top scorer: Marc Coy, 42 goals
- Relegated to Primera División: Monjos

OK Liga seasons
- ← 2010–11 2012–13 →

The 2011–12 season of the OK Liga was the 43rd season of top-tier rink hockey in Spain.

Barcelona Hoquei won their twenty-fourth OK Liga title.

== Teams ==
OK Liga 2011–12 teams
Catalonia

Team	Arena	Capacity	City/Area
Calafell	Joan Ortoll	600	Calafell
Coinasa Liceo	Pazo dos Deportes	5,000	A Coruña
Enrile PAS Alcoy	Francisco Laporta	3,500	Alcoy, Valencian Community
FC Barcelona	Palau Blaugrana	7,585	Barcelona
Igualada	Les Comes	3,000	Igualada
Monjos	Pabelló Municipal	500	Santa Margarida i els Monjos
Moritz Vendrell	Pavelló Municipal	308	El Vendrell
Noia Freixenet	Pavelló Olímpic	1,500	Sant Sadurní d'Anoia
Roncato Patí Vic	Pavelló Olímpic	3,000	Vic
Sather Blanes	Pavelló d'Esports	700	Blanes
SHUM Grupo Maestre	Pavelló Poliesportiu	965	Maçanet de la Selva
Tecnol Reus Deportiu	Palau d'Esports	2,500	Reus
Vilanova	Pavelló d'Esports	860	Vilanova i la Geltrú
Voltregà	Victoriano Oliveras de la Riva	1,000	Sant Hipòlit de Voltregà

== Final standings ==
Pos	Team	Pld	W	D	L	GF	GA	GD	Pts	Qualification or relegation
1	FC Barcelona	26	21	4	1	133	63	+70	67	European League
2	Coinasa Liceo	26	17	3	6	131	90	+41	54	European League
3	Noia Freixenet	26	13	6	7	93	83	+10	45	European League
4	Igualada	26	13	5	8	92	77	+15	44	European League
5	Tecnol Reus Deportiu	26	12	5	9	111	98	+13	41	European League
6	Sather Blanes	26	11	7	8	82	80	+2	40	CERS Cup
7	Moritz Vendrell	26	11	6	9	101	96	+5	39	CERS Cup
8	Vilanova Mopesa	26	11	5	10	109	106	+3	38	CERS Cup
9	SHUM Grupo Maestre	26	11	5	10	97	93	+4	38	CERS Cup
10	Roncato Patí Vic	26	9	5	12	78	92	−14	32	CERS Cup
11	Calafell Tot l'Any	26	7	3	16	95	124	−29	24	
12	Voltregà	26	5	4	17	73	109	−36	19	
13	Enrile-PAS-Alcoy	26	5	4	17	69	99	−30	19	
14	Monjos	26	2	6	18	97	151	−54	12	Relegated

Source: Federación Española de Patinaje

2011–12 OK Liga winners
(Catalonia)
Barcelona
Twenty-fourth title

== Top goal scorers ==
Player	Goals	Team
(Spain) Marc Coy	42	Calafell Tot l'Any
(Spain) Raúl Marín	38	Tecnol Reus
(Spain) Francesc Gil	35	Vilanova Mopesa
(Spain) Josep Lamas	35	Coinasa Liceo
(Argentina) Lucas Ordóñez	35	Roncato Patí Vic
(Spain) David Ros	35	Monjos
(Spain) Marc Torra	34	FC Barcelona
(Spain) Xavier Costa	27	Moritz Vendrell
(Spain) Marc Roca	27	SHUM Grupo Maestre
(Spain) Jordi Bargalló	26	Coinasa Liceo

== Copa del Rey ==
2012 Copa del Rey
Tournament details
- Arena: Poliesportiu del Garraf, Vilanova i la Geltrú
- Dates: 1–4 March 2012

Final positions
- Champions: FC Barcelona (19th title)
- Runners-up: Noia Freixenet

The 2012 Copa del Rey was the 69th edition of the Spanish men's roller hockey cup. It was played in Vilanova i la Geltrú between the eight first qualified teams after the first half of the season.

Quarter-finals
1 March - Poliesportiu del Garraf
Noia Freixenet	2
Sather Blanes	1
1 March - Poliesportiu del Garraf
Coinasa Liceo	8
Moritz Vendrell	3
1 March - Poliesportiu del Garraf
FC Barcelona	8
Tecnol Reus	7
1 March - Poliesportiu del Garraf
Vilanova Mopesa	11
SHUM Grupo Maestre	10

Semi-finals
3 March - Poliesportiu del Garraf
Coinasa Liceo	2
Noia Freixenet	4
3 March - Poliesportiu del Garraf
FC Barcelona	5
Vilanova Mopesa	4

Final
4 March - Poliesportiu del Garraf
Noia Freixenet	2
FC Barcelona	3

=== Quarter-finals ===
March 1, 2012	Noia Freixenet	2 – 1	Sather Blanes	Poliesportiu del Garraf, Vilanova i la Geltrú
18:45 UTC+01:00	Mitjans 3'; Seró 37'	Report	Teixidó 31'	Referee: Valverde Munuera & Gómez Sánchez

March 1, 2012	Coinasa Liceo	8 – 3	Moritz Vendrell	Poliesportiu del Garraf, Vilanova i la Geltrú
20:45 UTC+01:00	Miras 3', 6'; Lamas 10' da Silva 25', 43', 47'; Pérez 33'; Lamas 43'	Report	Cristian Rodríguez 14'; Sánchez 23', 48'	Referee: López Varela & Garrote Arcelús

March 2, 2012	FC Barcelona	8 – 7	Tecnol Reus	Poliesportiu del Garraf, Vilanova i la Geltrú
19:30 UTC+01:00	Pablo Álvarez 1', 42'; Torra 5', 6', 30'; Gual 16'; Ordeig 32'; Borregán 47'	Report	Molet 9', 44', 46'; Ferrer 19'; Marín 24', 49'; Casanovas 26'	Referee: Gómez Sánchez & Ribó Navarro

March 2, 2012	Vilanova Mopesa	11 – 10	SHUM Grupo Maestre	Poliesportiu del Garraf, Vilanova i la Geltrú
21:30 UTC+01:00	Creus 1', 4'; Martínez 2', 36', 48'; Gil 9', 24', 47'; García 32'; Rodríguez 35'; Pujals 46'	Report	Plaza 14', 31', 47'; Bartrés 28', 40', 46'; Soler 44', 48', 49'; Roca 49'	Referee: García Romero & Sandoval Santos

=== Semifinals ===
March 3, 2012	Coinasa Liceo	2 – 4	Noia Freixenet	Poliesportiu del Garraf, Vilanova i la Geltrú
14:00 UTC+01:00	Lamas 23'; J Bargalló 49'	Report	Feixas 27', 47'; F Bargalló 34' del Amor 44'	Referee: Galán García & Gómez Sánchez

March 3, 2012	FC Barcelona	5 – 4	Vilanova Mopesa	Poliesportiu del Garraf, Vilanova i la Geltrú
16:00 UTC+01:00	Ordeig 9'; Torra 15', 26', 37'; Pablo Álvarez 32'	Report	García 4', 27'; Gil 15', 32'	Referee: Melero López & Gómez Sánchez

=== Final ===
March 4, 2012	Noia Freixenet	2 – 3	FC Barcelona	Poliesportiu del Garraf, Vilanova i la Geltrú
16:00 UTC+01:00	Seró 20', 49'	Report	Torra 20'; Pablo Álvarez 21'; Ordeig 24'	Referee: Valverde Munuera & García Romero
