= 2013–14 OK Liga =

- League: OK Liga
- Sport: Roller hockey
- Duration: 11 October, 2013–7 June, 2014
- Teams: 16
- League champions: FC Barcelona
- Runners-up: Coinasa Liceo
- Top scorer: Pablo Álvarez, 56 goals
- Relegated to Primera División: Lloret, Muralla Òptica Blanes & Vilanova

OK Liga seasons
- ← 2012–13 2014–15 →

The 2013–14 season of the OK Liga was the 45th season of top-tier rink hockey in Spain.

FC Barcelona returned to win the championship after a one-year hiatus. It was the twenty-fifth title of its history.

== Teams ==
OK Liga 2013–14 teams
Catalonia

Team	Arena	Capacity	City/Area
Coinasa Liceo	Pazo dos Deportes	5,000	A Coruña, Galicia
FC Barcelona	Palau Blaugrana	7,585	Barcelona
Moritz Vendrell	Pavelló Municipal	308	El Vendrell
Reus Deportiu	Palau d'Esports	2,500	Reus
Vic	Pavelló Olímpic	3,000	Vic
Noia Freixenet	Pavelló Olímpic	1,500	Sant Sadurní d'Anoia
ICG Software Lleida	Onze de Setembre	2,200	Lleida
Voltregà	Victorià Oliveras de la Riva	1,000	Sant Hipòlit de Voltregà
Monbús Igualada	Les Comes	3,000	Igualada
Lloret	Pavelló Municipal	1,140	Lloret de Mar
Vilanova	Pavelló d'Esports	860	Vilanova i la Geltrú
Muralla Òptica Blanes	Pavelló Municipal	700	Blanes
Calafell Tot l'Any	Joan Ortoll	600	Calafell
Cerceda	Presidente González Laxe	500	Cerceda, Galicia
Tordera	Pavelló Parroquial	800	Tordera
Vilafranca Capital del Vi	Pavelló d'Hoquei	1,000	Vilafranca del Penedès

== Standings ==
Pos	Team	Pld	W	D	L	GF	GA	GD	Pts	Qualification or relegation
1	FC Barcelona	30	27	1	2	207	66	+141	82	European League
2	Coinasa Liceo	30	23	3	4	167	81	+86	72	European League
3	Vic	30	19	4	7	116	81	+35	61	European League
4	Reus Deportiu	30	16	5	9	147	117	+30	53	European League
5	Moritz Vendrell	30	15	4	11	130	116	+14	49	CERS Cup
6	Noia Freixenet	30	13	6	11	111	100	+11	45	CERS Cup
7	Monbús Igualada	30	14	3	13	95	105	−10	45	CERS Cup
8	Calafell Tot l'Any	30	13	5	12	112	115	−3	44	CERS Cup
9	Cerceda	30	12	7	11	121	118	+3	43	CERS Cup
10	Voltregà	30	11	8	11	107	97	+10	41	
11	Vilafranca Capital del Vi	30	11	5	14	112	107	+5	38	
12	Tordera	30	10	2	18	85	126	−41	32	
13	ICG Software Lleida	30	9	4	17	90	118	−28	31	
14	Lloret	30	8	5	17	93	121	−28	29	Relegated
15	Muralla Òptica Blanes	30	7	2	21	72	130	−58	23	Relegated
16	Vilanova	30	0	0	30	74	241	−167	0	Relegated

2013–14 OK Liga winners
(Catalonia)
FC Barcelona
Twenty-fifth title

== Top goal scorers ==
#	Player	Goals	Team
1	(Argentina) Pablo Álvarez	56	FC Barcelona
2	(Argentina) Lucas Ordóñez	54	Coinasa Liceo
3	(Spain) Jordi Adroher	48	Reus Deportiu
4	(Spain) Marc Torra	44	FC Barcelona
5	(Spain) Sergio Miras	38	Moritz Vendrell

== Copa del Rey ==
2014 Copa del Rey
Tournament details
- Arena: Pavelló Onze de Setembre, Lleida
- Dates: 27 February–2 March 2014

Final positions
- Champions: Moritz Vendrell (2nd title)
- Runners-up: FC Barcelona

Awards and statistics
- MVP: (Spain) Xevi Puigbí

The 2014 Copa del Rey was the 71st edition of the Spanish men's roller hockey cup. It was played in Lleida between the seven first qualified teams after the first half of the season and ICG Software Lleida as host team.

Moritz Vendrell repeated as champion and achieved its second trophy.

Quarter-finals
2	Coinasa Liceo	3 (0)
6	Moritz Vendrell	3 (3)
3	Voltregà	2
5	Reus Deportiu	5
4	Vic	1
7	Cerceda	0
1	FC Barcelona	6
15	ICG Software Lleida	3

Semi-finals
6	Moritz Vendrell	2 (5)
5	Reus Deportiu	2 (4)
4	Vic	1
1	FC Barcelona	5

Final
6	Moritz Vendrell	6
1	FC Barcelona	3

=== Quarter-finals ===
February 27, 2014	Voltregà	2–5	Reus Deportiu	Lleida
19:15 (UTC+1)	Armengol 3'; À Rodríguez 15'	Report	Costa 7', 26', 34'; Casanovas 32'; Selva 43'	Stadium: Onze de Setembre; Referee: Ribó Navarro, Prades Martínez

February 27, 2014	Coinasa Liceo	3–3 (a.e.t.) (0–3 p)	Moritz Vendrell	Lleida
21:30 (UTC+1)	J Lamas 8'; Ordoñez 32'; E Lamas 36'	Report	Ferrer 35', 38'; Miras 37'	Stadium: Onze de Setembre; Referee: Gómez Sánchez, Garmendia Cano

February 28, 2014	Vic	1–0	Cerceda	Lleida
19:00 (UTC+1)	Roca 33'	Report		Stadium: Onze de Setembre; Referee: Sandoval Santos, Sanz Rodríguez

February 28, 2014	ICG Software	3–6	FC Barcelona	Lleida
21:30 (UTC+1)	Rodero 26', 44', 46'	Report	S Panadero 7'; Torra 13'; Pascual 15'; P Álvarez 32'; R García 43'	Stadium: Onze de Setembre; Referee: Molina Planelles, López Expósito

=== Semifinals ===
March 1, 2014	Moritz Vendrell	2–2 (a.e.t.) (5–4 p)	Reus Deportiu	Lleida
15:00 (UTC+1)	Creus 42'; Miras 46'	Report	Casanovas 31'; Salvat 40'	Stadium: Onze de Setembre; Referee: Fernández García, Mayor Oliván

March 1, 2014	Vic	1–5	FC Barcelona	Lleida
17:00 (UTC+1)	Roca 34'	Report	Torra 8'; Marín 14'; P Álvarez 44'; Barroso 45'; Gual 48'	Stadium: Onze de Setembre; Referee: Gómez Sánchez, Melero López

=== Final ===
March 2, 2014	Moritz Vendrell	6–3	FC Barcelona	Lleida
15:30 (UTC+1)	Miras 8'; Cortijo 17'; Albesa 26'; Rodríguez 33', 45'; Creus 47'	Report	S Panadero 31'; R García 31'; Torra 35'	Stadium: Onze de Setembre; Referee: García Romero, Valverde Munuera
