= 2015–16 OK Liga =

- League: OK Liga
- Sport: Roller hockey
- Duration: 20 September 2015–4 June 2015
- Number of teams: 16
- League champions: FC Barcelona Lassa
- Runners-up: CP Vic

OK Liga seasons
- ← 2014–15 2016–17 →

The 2015–16 season of the OK Liga is the 47th season of top-tier rink hockey in Spain.

== Teams ==
Catalan teams in OK Liga 2015–16 season
Remaining teams 2015–16 teams

Every team from Catalonia unless otherwise noted.

Team	Arena	Capacity	City/Area
FC Barcelona Lassa	Palau Blaugrana	7,585	Barcelona
Liceo	Pazo dos Deportes	5,000	A Coruña
Moritz Vendrell	Pavelló Municipal	308	El Vendrell
Vic	Pavelló Olímpic	3,000	Vic
Reus Deportiu	Pavelló del Reus Deportiu	2,500	Reus
HockeyGlobal Cerceda	Presidente González Laxe	500	Cerceda, Galicia
Voltregà	Victorià Oliveras de la Riva	1,000	Sant Hipòlit de Voltregà
Cafès Novell Vilafranca Capital del Vi	Pavelló d'Hoquei	1,000	Vilafranca del Penedès
Enrile PAS Alcoy	Francisco Laporta	1,500	Alcoy
Igualada Calaf Grup	Les Comes	3,000	Igualada
ICG Software Lleida	Onze de Setembre	2,200	Lleida
Vallès Calafell Tot l'Any	Joan Ortoll	600	Calafell
Noia Freixenet	Pavelló Olímpic	1,500	Sant Sadurní d'Anoia
Lloret Vila Esportiva	Pavelló Municipal	1,100	Lloret de Mar
SHUM Balder Técnica	Pavelló Municipal	700	Maçanet de la Selva
Recam Làser Caldes	Torre Roja	800	Caldes de Montbui

== Standings ==
Pos	Team	Pld	W	D	L	GF	GA	GD	Pts	Qualification or relegation
1	FC Barcelona Lassa	30	25	3	2	158	66	+92	78	European League
2	Vic	30	19	6	5	119	74	+45	63	European League
3	Liceo	30	19	4	7	147	88	+59	61	European League
4	Reus Deportiu	30	15	6	9	118	98	+20	51	European League
5	Moritz Vendrell	30	15	5	10	126	113	+13	50	CERS Cup
6	Cafès Novell Vilafranca Capital del Vi	30	12	8	10	89	82	+7	44	CERS Cup
7	Recam Làser Caldes	30	13	4	13	89	100	−11	43	CERS Cup
8	Igualada Calaf Grup	30	13	2	15	87	95	−8	41	CERS Cup
9	Noia Freixenet	30	10	9	11	100	116	−16	39	
10	Voltregà	30	12	2	16	97	103	−6	38	
11	HockeyGlobal Cerceda	30	10	5	15	87	122	−35	35	
12	Enrile PAS Alcoy	30	9	4	17	91	116	−25	31	
13	ICG Software Lleida	30	8	6	16	84	113	−29	30	
14	Lloret Vila Esportiva	30	9	3	18	81	115	−34	30	Relegated
15	SHUM Balder Técnica	30	7	6	17	100	120	−20	27	Relegated
16	Calafell Tot l'Any	30	6	3	21	78	130	−52	21	Relegated

== Top goalscorers ==
#	Player	Goals	Team
1	(Spain) Raúl Marín	50	Reus Deportiu
2	(Spain) Jordi Bargalló	49	Liceo
3	(Spain) Pablo Álvarez	39	FC Barcelona Lassa
4	(Spain) Andreu Tomàs	37	ICG Software Lleida
5	(Argentina) Lucas Ordóñez	37	FC Barcelona Lassa

== Copa del Rey ==
2017 Copa del Rey
Tournament details
- Arena: Pavelló d'Esports, Reus
- Dates: 23–26 February 2016

Final positions
- Champions: Barcelona Lassa (20th title)
- Runners-up: Vic

The 2016 Copa del Rey was the 73rd edition of the Spanish men's roller hockey cup. It was played at the Pavelló d'Esports de Reus between the eight first qualified teams after the first half of the season.

Barcelona Lassa won its 20th cup.

Quarter-finals
Barcelona Lassa	8
Igualada Calaf Grup	0
Noia Freixenet (pen.)	5 (2)
Recam Làser Caldes	5 (1)
Liceo	7
Voltregà	6
Vic	6
Reus Deportiu	5

Semi-finals
Barcelona Lassa	6
Noia Freixenet	1
Liceo	1
Vic	4

Final
Barcelona Lassa	4
Vic	1

=== Quarter-finals ===
February 25, 2016	Noia Feixenet	5–5 (a.e.t.) (2 – 1 p)	Recam Làser Caldes	Reus
19:00 (UTC+1)	Del Amor 2', 25'; Esteller 5'; Albesa 34', 42'	Report	Mendes 3'; Rovira 10'; Molera 30', 36'; Urbano 43'	Stadium: Palau d'Esports; Referee: Távera Bellido, López Expósito
	Penalties
	Rosa (penalty missed); Palau (penalty scored); Xaus (penalty missed); Caldú (penalty missed); Del Amor (penalty missed); Palau (penalty scored)		(penalty missed) Mendes; (penalty scored) Pastor; (penalty missed) Urbano; (penalty missed) Rovira; (penalty missed) Oller; (penalty missed) Oller

February 25, 2016	Barcelona Lassa	8–0	Igualada Calaf Grup	Reus
21:15 (UTC+1)	Álvarez 8'; Gual 9'; Panadero 24'; Pascual 33'; Ordóñez 39'; Costa 42', 47'; Barroso 48'	Report		Stadium: Palau d'Esports; Referee: Ribó Navarro, González González

February 26, 2016	Liceo	7–6	Voltregà	Reus
18:30 (UTC+1)	Vives 7', 47'; J. Bargalló 21', 32', 43'; P. Bargalló 46', 49'	Report	Rodríguez 20', 48'; Vargas 27', 30'; Armengol 41'; Alabart 44'	Stadium: Palau d'Esports; Referee: Garrote Arcelus, Melero López

February 26, 2016	Vic	6–5 (a.e.t.)	Reus Deportiu	Reus
21:00 (UTC+1)	Bancells 12'; Ordeig 30', 34'; Font 31'; Presas 45'; Rodríguez 57'	Report	Coy 27', 35'; Marín 30'; Platero 30'; Salvat 39'	Stadium: Palau d'Esports; Referee: Fernández García, Díaz Cosme

=== Semifinals ===
February 27, 2016	Barcelona Lassa	6–1	Noia Freixenet	Reus
19:00 (UTC+1)	Panadero 8'; Barroso 19'; Álvarez 27', 28'; Pascual 31'; Ordóñez 40'	Report	Rosa 33'	Stadium: Palau d'Esports; Referee: Gómez Sánchez, Mayor Oliván

February 27, 2016	Liceo	1–4	Vic	Reus
21:00 (UTC+1)	J. Bargalló 31'	Report	Rodríguez 6', 24'; Font 29', 40'	Stadium: Palau d'Esports; Referee: Gómez Sánchez, Mayor Oliván

=== Final ===
February 28, 2016	Barcelona Lassa	4–1	Vic	Reus
16:00 (UTC+1)	Álvarez 13', 34'; Panadero 29'; Ordóñez 48'	Report	Rodríguez 46'	Stadium: Palau d'Esports; Referee: Óscar Valverda, Fran González

== Supercopa de España ==
2015 Supercopa de España
Tournament details
- Arena: Pavelló Olímpic, Vic
- Dates: 31 October–1 November 2015

Final positions
- Champions: Barcelona Lassa (9th title)
- Runners-up: Liceo

The 2015 Supercopa de España was the 12th edition of the Spanish men's roller hockey cup. It was played in Vic.

Barcelona achieved its ninth title, the fifth consecutive.

Semifinals
31 October
Barcelona Lassa	4
Moritz Vendrell	3
31 October
Liceo (p)	5 (3)
Vic	5 (2)

Final
1 November
Barcelona Lassa	6
Liceo	5
