= 2016–17 OK Liga =

OK Liga
- Champions: Barcelona Lassa
- Relegated: Manlleu; Cafès Novell Vilafranca; Reicomsa Alcobendas
- European League: Barcelona Lassa; Reus Deportiu La Fira; Vic; Liceo
- CERS Cup: Voltregà; Moritz Vendrell; Noia Freixenet; Igualada Calaf Grup
- Matches played: 240
- Goals scored: 1,495 (6.23 per match)
- Top goalscorer: Raül Marín (38 goals)

The 2016–17 OK Liga is the 48th season of the top-tier league of rink hockey in Spain. It started on 24 September 2016 and finished on 3 June 2017.

== Teams ==
Non-Catalan teams 2016–17 teams
Catalan teams in OK Liga 2016–17 season

After the end of the previous season, Cerceda resigned to its spot in OK Liga, being Lloret Vila Esportiva spared from relegation.

Team	Arena	City/Area
Barcelona Lassa	Palau Blaugrana	Barcelona
Cafès Novell Vilafranca Capital del Vi	Pavelló d'Hoquei	Vilafranca del Penedès
Citylift Girona	Palau II	Girona
Enrile PAS Alcoy	Francisco Laporta	Alcoy
ICG Software Lleida	Onze de Setembre	Lleida
Igualada Calaf Grup	Les Comes	Igualada
Liceo	Riazor	A Coruña
Lloret Vila Esportiva	Pavelló Municipal	Lloret de Mar
Manlleu	Pavelló d'Esports	Manlleu
Moritz Vendrell	Pavelló Municipal	El Vendrell
Noia Freixenet	Pavelló Olímpic	Sant Sadurní d'Anoia
Recam Làser Caldes	Torre Roja	Caldes de Montbui
Reicomsa Alcobendas	Amaya Valdemoro	Alcobendas
Reus Deportiu La Fira	Pavelló del Reus Deportiu	Reus
Vic	Pavelló Olímpic	Vic
Voltregà	Victorià Oliveras de la Riva	Sant Hipòlit de Voltregà

== Overview ==
On 7 May 2017, Barcelona Lassa achieved its 28th title, fourth consecutive, after earning a 4–4 draw in the round 27 at the rink of its historic rival Reus Deportiu La Fira.

== League table ==
Pos	Team	Pld	W	D	L	GF	GA	GD	Pts	Qualification or relegation
1	Barcelona Lassa (C)	30	24	3	3	142	65	+77	75	Qualification to European League
2	Reus Deportiu La Fira	30	20	6	4	137	85	+52	66	Qualification to European League
3	Liceo	30	19	4	7	119	85	+34	61	Qualification to European League
4	Vic	30	18	5	7	120	83	+37	59	Qualification to European League
5	Voltregà	30	15	8	7	86	62	+24	53	Qualification to CERS Cup
6	Mortiz Vendrell	30	15	6	9	105	93	+12	51	Qualification to CERS Cup
7	Igualada Calaf Group	30	12	6	12	93	92	+1	42	Qualification to CERS Cup
8	Noia Freixenet	30	10	8	12	86	86	0	38	Qualification to CERS Cup
9	ICG Software Lleida	30	10	6	14	86	104	−18	36	Qualification to CERS Cup
10	Enrile PAS Alcoy	30	9	5	16	93	117	−24	32	
11	Recam Làser Caldes	30	8	8	14	71	86	−15	32	
12	Lloret Vila Esportiva	30	8	6	16	60	93	−33	30	
13	Citylift Girona	30	8	5	17	71	99	−28	29	
14	Reicomsa Alcobendas (R)	30	6	5	19	89	129	−40	23	Relegation to Primera Nacional
15	Cafès Novell Vilafranca Capital del Vi (R)	30	6	5	19	69	114	−45	23	Relegation to Primera Nacional
16	Manlleu (R)	30	4	10	16	68	102	−34	22	Relegation to Primera Nacional

Source: FEP.es
(C) Champions; (R) Relegated

== Results ==
Home \ Away	BAR	VFR	GIR	ALC	LLE	IGU	LIC	LLO	MAN	VEN	NOI	CAL	ACB	REU	VIC	VOL
Barcelona Lassa	—	7–1	4–1	6–2	7–0	7–3	2–1	8–0	4–0	5–0	6–2	4–1	7–3	6–6	4–4	2–3
Cafès Novell Vilafranca Capital del Vi	5–7	—	4–4	4–3	2–4	3–2	2–5	0–0	4–4	4–6	3–4	4–2	4–3	1–7	2–6	2–4
Citylift Girona	2–3	3–1	—	1–4	4–2	2–5	6–4	1–5	4–2	3–3	3–3	5–2	2–2	1–3	2–5	0–5
Enrile PAS Alcoy	1–4	3–3	5–4	—	8–5	5–2	2–3	1–2	5–4	3–6	3–5	2–3	5–4	3–5	3–4	2–2
ICG Software Lleida	4–6	5–2	4–2	2–1	—	2–4	1–3	2–1	3–3	4–7	4–3	6–5	7–3	2–3	2–1	2–4
Igualada Calaf Group	0–4	3–2	3–1	5–4	4–1	—	2–4	4–4	2–2	3–4	2–2	5–1	9–2	3–3	1–3	3–4
Liceo	5–3	5–1	3–1	4–4	2–3	7–1	—	4–3	3–5	7–2	4–3	3–2	7–2	5–8	2–2	5–0
Lloret Vila Esportiva	1–5	2–3	2–1	1–2	2–1	1–3	3–5	—	1–1	3–3	2–2	1–4	3–4	1–5	0–8	1–2
Manlleu	1–2	2–3	2–1	3–3	1–1	2–5	3–4	3–3	—	0–2	1–3	2–2	3–2	3–3	3–7	3–3
Mortiz Vendrell	2–3	3–2	4–5	5–2	4–2	2–2	2–2	3–4	5–2	—	6–2	2–2	5–2	4–5	8–6	1–5
Noia Freixenet	0–4	4–1	1–1	4–2	6–2	1–1	3–4	2–3	4–7	1–2	—	3–2	2–2	5–0	5–2	2–5
Recam Làser Caldes	1–3	1–1	1–0	2–4	3–3	5–4	5–3	4–2	3–0	1–3	2–2	—	3–4	1–1	4–4	1–3
Reicomsa Alcobendas	4–6	3–0	3–4	7–4	1–1	3–5	5–6	4–1	4–2	4–4	2–5	2–2	—	1–3	4–6	3–5
Reus Deportiu La Fira	4–4	3–5	12–5	4–1	7–6	6–2	5–2	4–1	8–1	3–4	6–4	5–3	4–1	—	4–6	2–0
Vic	6–4	1–0	1–0	7–1	3–3	4–2	3–6	3–5	4–3	3–1	1–0	4–1	9–3	3–5	—	2–3
Voltregà	2–5	6–1	1–2	4–4	2–2	1–3	1–1	1–2	4–0	4–1	3–3	1–2	5–2	1–1	2–2	—

Source: FEP.es
Legend: Blue = home team win; Yellow = draw; Red = away team win.

== Top scorers ==
Rank	Player	Club	Goals
1	(Spain) Raül Marín	Reus Deportiu La Fira	38
2	(Spain) Pablo Álvarez	Barcelona Lassa	36
3	(Spain) Ferran Formatjé	PAS Alcoy	31
4	(Spain) Raül Pelícano	Citylift Girona	29
5	(Portugal) Emanuel García	Igualada Calaf Grup	27
5	(Spain) Gonzalo Pérez	Reicomsa Alcobendas	27

== Copa del Rey ==
2017 Copa del Rey
Tournament details
- Arena: Polideportivo Amaya Valdemoro, Alcobendas
- Dates: 25–28 February 2017

Final positions
- Champions: Barcelona Lassa (21st title)
- Runners-up: Reus Deportiu La Fira

The 2017 Copa del Rey was the 74th edition of the Spanish men's roller hockey cup. It was played in Alcobendas between the seven first qualified teams after the first half of the season and Reicomsa Alcobendas as host team.

Barcelona Lassa defended successfully its title and won its 21st cup.

Quarterfinals
23 February
Vic (p)	4
Moritz Vendrell	4
23 February
Reus Deportiu La Fira	7
Reicomsa Alcobendas	6
24 February
Liceo	3
Lloret Vila Esportiva	1
24 February
Barcelona Lassa	6
Voltregà	3

Semifinals
25 February
Vic	3
Reus Deportiu La Fira (p)	3
25 February
Liceo	2
Barcelona Lassa (p)	2

Final
26 February
Reus Deportiu La Fira	3
Barcelona Lassa	4

== Supercopa de España ==
2016 Supercopa de España
Tournament details
- Arena: Pavelló del Reus Deportiu, Reus
- Dates: 17–18 September 2016

Final positions
- Champions: Liceo (1st title)
- Runners-up: Reus Deportiu La Fira

The 2016 Supercopa de España was the 13th edition of the Spanish men's roller hockey cup. It was played in Reus.

Liceo achieved its first official title ever.

Semifinals
17 September
Reus Deportiu La Fira	3
Barcelona Lassa	2
17 September
Liceo	4
Vic	2

Final
18 September
Reus Deportiu La Fira	1
Liceo	2
