= 2008–09 OK Liga =

- League: OK Liga
- Sport: Roller hockey
- League champions: Barcelona Sorli Discau
- Runners-up: Coinasa Liceo
- Relegated to Primera División: Grup Clima Mataró; Güell Voltregà; Sitges Arian

OK Liga seasons
- ← 2007–08 2009–10 →

The 2008–09 OK Liga was the 40th season of the top-tier league of rink hockey in Spain.

Barcelona Sorli Discau finished the league as champion.

== Competition format ==
Sixteen teams joined the league.

The eight first teams at the end of the regular season qualified for the playoffs while the three last teams were relegated to Primera División.

== Regular season ==
Pos	Team	Pld	W	D	L	GF	GA	GD	Pts	Qualification or relegation
1	Barcelona Sorli Discau	30	22	5	3	95	43	+52	71	Qualification to playoffs
2	Roncato Vic	30	22	2	6	87	49	+38	68	Qualification to playoffs
3	Coinasa Liceo	30	18	7	5	90	56	+34	61	Qualification to playoffs
4	Alnimar Reus Deportiu	30	19	4	7	100	58	+42	61	Qualification to playoffs
5	Noia Freixenet	30	14	6	10	87	89	−2	48	Qualification to playoffs
6	Proinosa Igualada	30	14	5	11	78	68	+10	47	Qualification to playoffs
7	Grup Lloret	30	13	6	11	68	57	+11	45	Qualification to playoffs
8	Grup Castillo Lleida	30	12	4	14	77	82	−5	40	Qualification to playoffs
9	Enrile PAS Alcoy	30	10	5	15	73	95	−22	35	
10	Viva Hàbitat Blanes	30	10	4	16	63	74	−11	34	
11	Vilanova L'Ull Blau	30	8	9	13	59	68	−9	33	
12	Astra Pool Maçanet	30	7	10	13	75	101	−26	31	
13	Cemex Tenerife	30	8	6	16	77	94	−17	30	
14	Grup Clima Mataró	30	6	11	13	62	73	−11	29	Relegation to Primera División
15	Güell Voltregà	30	6	7	17	51	93	−42	25	Relegation to Primera División
16	Sitges Arian	30	3	5	22	55	97	−42	14	Relegation to Primera División

== Playoffs ==
Quarterfinals were played with a best-of-three format, while semifinals and final were played with a best-of-five series.

Seeded teams played games 1 and 3 of the quarterfinals and 1, 2 and 5 of semifinals and finals at home.

Quarterfinals
Barcelona Sorli Discau	6	7
Grup Castillo Lleida	0	1
Alnimar Reus Deportiu	7	2	4
Noia Freixenet	4	3	3
Roncato Vic	3	3
Grup Lloret	2	0
Coinasa Liceo	4	4
Proinosa Igualada	2	2

Semifinals
Barcelona Sorli Discau	4	3	6
Alnimar Reus Deportiu	2	2	6
Roncato Vic	2	4	6	1
Coinasa Liceo	1	5	4	3

Finals
Barcelona Sorli Discau	10	12	6
Coinasa Liceo	0	10	5

== Final standings ==
Pos	Team	Qualification or relegation
1	Barcelona Sorli Discau	CERH European League
2	Coinasa Liceo	CERS Cup
3	Roncato Vic	CERH European League
4	Alnimar Reus Deportiu	CERH European League
5	Noia Freixenet	CERH European League
6	Proinosa Igualada	CERS Cup
7	Grup Lloret	CERH European League
8	Grup Castillo Lleida	
9	Enrile PAS Alcoy	CERS Cup
10	Viva Hàbitat Blanes	CERS Cup
11	Vilanova L'Ull Blau	CERS Cup
12	Astra Pool Maçanet	
13	Cemex Tenerife	
14	Grup Clima Mataró	Relegation and CERH European League
15	Güell Voltregà	Relegation to Primera División
16	Sitges Arian	Relegation to Primera División

== Copa del Rey ==
2009 Copa del Rey
Tournament details
- Arena: Riazor, A Coruña
- Dates: 19–22 March 2009

Final positions
- Champions: Roncato Vic (2nd title)
- Runners-up: Barcelona Sorli Discau

The 2009 Copa del Rey was the 66th edition of the Spanish men's roller hockey cup. It was played in A Coruña between the eight first qualified teams after the first half of the season.

Roncato Vic won its 2nd cup.

Quarterfinals
19 March
Coinasa Liceo	6
Proinosa Igualada	3
19 March
Roncato Vic	4
Noia Freixenet	1
20 March
Barcelona Sorli Discau	6
Viva Hàbitat Blanes	1
20 March
Alnimar Reus Deportiu	2
Grup Castillo Lleida	1

Semifinals
21 March
Coinasa Liceo	1
Roncato Vic	2
21 March
Barcelona Sorli Discau	4
Alnimar Reus Deportiu	2

Final
28 February
Roncato Vic	2
Barcelona Sorli Discau	1
