= 2006–07 OK Liga =

- League: OK Liga
- Sport: Roller hockey
- League champions: Barcelona Sorli Discau
- Runners-up: Alnimar Reus Deportiu
- Relegated to Primera División: Enrile PAS Alcoy; Cysugal Vigo Stick; Astra Pool Maçanet

OK Liga seasons
- ← 2005–06 2007–08 →

The 2006–07 OK Liga was the 38th season of the top-tier league of rink hockey in Spain.

Barcelona Sorli Discau finished the league as champion.

== Competition format ==
The eight first teams at the end of the regular season qualified for the playoffs while the three last teams were relegated to Primera División.

== Regular season ==
Pos	Team	Pld	W	D	L	GF	GA	GD	Pts	Qualification or relegation
1	Barcelona Sorli Discau	30	27	2	1	150	53	+97	83	Qualification to playoffs
2	Alnimar Reus Deportiu	34	21	6	7	97	52	+45	69	Qualification to playoffs
3	Roncato Vic	33	18	8	7	75	38	+37	62	Qualification to playoffs
4	Liceo Vodafone	30	17	3	10	96	68	+28	54	Qualification to playoffs
5	Vilanova L'Ull Blau	30	16	5	9	92	85	+7	53	Qualification to playoffs
6	Noia Freixenet	30	14	7	9	96	88	+8	49	Qualification to playoffs
7	Proinosa Igualada	30	12	9	9	73	59	+14	45	Qualification to playoffs
8	Cemex Tenerife	30	13	4	13	85	107	−22	43	Qualification to playoffs
9	Viva Hàbitat Blanes	30	10	8	12	67	75	−8	38	
10	Grup Lloret	30	8	8	14	60	90	−30	32	
11	Leche Celta Voltregà	30	9	4	17	63	88	−25	31	
12	Grup Clima Mataró	30	7	7	16	78	97	−19	28	
13	Grup Castillo Lleida	30	7	7	16	61	90	−29	28	
14	Enrile PAS Alcoy	30	6	4	20	78	123	−45	22	Relegation to Primera División
15	Cysugal Vigo Stick	30	4	8	18	70	100	−30	20	Relegation to Primera División
16	Astra Pool Maçanet	30	5	5	20	64	92	−28	20	Relegation to Primera División

== Playoffs ==
Quarterfinals were played with a best-of-three format, while semifinals and final were played with a best-of-five series.

Seeded teams played games 1 and 3 of the quarterfinals and the finals and games 1, 2 and 5 of the finals at home.

Quarterfinals
Barcelona Sorli Discau	9	4
Cemex Tenerife	3	3
Liceo Vodafone	6	2
Vilanova L'Ull Blau	3	2
Alnimar Reus Deportiu	3	3
Proinosa Igualada	2	2
Roncato Vic	1	3	1
Noia Freixenet	2	2	2

Semifinals
Barcelona Sorli Discau	5	2	8
Liceo Vodafone	1	3	2
Alnimar Reus Deportiu	3 (3)	3	2
Noia Freixenet	3 (1)	3 (p)	1

Finals
Barcelona Sorli Discau	5	4	2 (3)
Alnimar Reus Deportiu	1	2	2 (1)

== Final standings ==
Pos	Team	Qualification or relegation
1	Barcelona Sorli Discau	CERH European League
2	Alnimar Reus Deportiu	CERH European League
3	Coinasa Liceo	CERH European League
4	Noia Freixenet	CERH European League
5	Roncato Vic	CERH European League
6	Vilanova L'Ull Blau	CERH European League
7	Proinosa Igualada	CERH European League
8	Cemex Tenerife	CERS Cup
9	Viva Hàbitat Blanes	CERS Cup
10	Grup Lloret	CERS Cup
11	Leche Celta Voltregà	CERS Cup
12	Grup Clima Mataró	
13	Grup Castillo Lleida	
14	Enrile PAS Alcoy	Relegation to Primera División
15	Cysugal Vigo Stick	Relegation to Primera División
16	Astra Pool Maçanet	Relegation to Primera División

== Copa del Rey ==
2007 Copa del Rey
Tournament details
- Arena: Pavelló Francisco Laporta, Alcoy
- Dates: 1–4 March 2007

Final positions
- Champions: Barcelona Sorli Discau
- Runners-up: Alnimar Reus Deportiu

The 2007 Copa del Rey was the 64th edition of the Spanish men's roller hockey cup. It was played in Alcoy between the seven first qualified teams after the first half of the season and Enrile PAS Alcoy as host team.

Barcelona Sorli Discau won its 17th cup.

Quarterfinals
1 March
Alnimar Reus Deportiu	5
Vilanova L'Ull Blau	2
1 March
Noia Freixenet	5
Enrile PAS Alcoy	3
2 March
Liceo Vodafone	3
Viva Hàbitat Blanes	1
2 March
Barcelona Sorli Discau	2
Roncato Vic	1

Semifinals
3 March
Alnimar Reus Deportiu	2
Noia Freixenet	1
3 March
Liceo Vodafone	2
Barcelona Sorli Discau	5

Final
4 March
Alnimar Reus Deportiu	1
Barcelona Sorli Discau	3
