= 2004–05 OK Liga =

- League: OK Liga
- Sport: Roller hockey
- League champions: Barcelona Sorli Discau
- Runners-up: Alnimar Reus Deportiu
- Relegated to Primera División: Cysugal Vigo Stick; Aiscondel Vila-seca; Lleida Llista Blava

OK Liga seasons
- ← 2003–04 2005–06 →

The 2004–05 OK Liga was the 36th season of the top-tier league of rink hockey in Spain.

Barcelona Sorli Discau finished the league as champion.

== Competition format ==
Sixteen teams joined the league.

The eight first teams at the end of the regular season qualified for the playoffs while the three last teams were relegated to Primera División.

== Regular season ==
Pos	Team	Pld	W	D	L	GF	GA	GD	Pts	Qualification or relegation
1	Barcelona Sorli Discau	30	27	2	1	162	55	+107	83	Qualification to playoffs
2	Alnimar Reus Deportiu	30	20	3	7	104	57	+47	63	Qualification to playoffs
3	Hormipresa Igualada	30	16	5	9	103	77	+26	53	Qualification to playoffs
4	Noia Freixenet	30	14	9	7	89	72	+17	51	Qualification to playoffs
5	Vilanova L'Ull Blau	30	12	7	11	79	87	−8	43	Qualification to playoffs
6	Roncato Vic	30	12	6	12	90	86	+4	42	Qualification to playoffs
7	Lloret	30	12	6	12	77	77	0	42	Qualification to playoffs
8	Liceo Vodafone	30	11	7	12	90	83	+7	40	Qualification to playoffs
9	Viva Hàbitat Blanes	30	11	4	15	61	71	−10	37	
10	Cemex Tenerife	30	9	8	13	90	101	−11	35	
11	Enrile PAS Alcoy	30	10	3	17	78	111	−33	33	
12	Leche Celta Voltregà	30	9	5	16	69	87	−18	32	
13	Astra Pool Maçanet	30	7	11	12	84	104	−20	32	
14	Cysugal Vigo Stick	30	8	7	15	63	102	−39	31	Relegation to Primera División
15	Aiscondel Vila-seca	30	7	8	15	89	129	−40	29	Relegation to Primera División
16	Lleida Llista Blava	30	6	7	17	69	98	−29	25	Relegation to Primera División

== Playoffs ==
Quarterfinals were played with a best-of-three format, while semifinals and final were played with a best-of-five series.

Seeded teams played games 1, 2 and 5 of the series at home.

Quarterfinals
Barcelona Sorli Discau	6	5	5
Liceo Vodafone	0	1	4
Noia Freixenet	1	4	4
Vilanova L'Ull Blau	0	3	3
Alnimar Reus Deportiu	2	6	3
Grup Lloret	1	1	0
Hormipresa Igualada	5	2	3
Roncato Vic	6	3	8

Semifinals
Barcelona Sorli Discau	5	2	3
Noia Freixenet	1	1	2
Alnimar Reus Deportiu	2	5	3
Roncato Vic	0	1	1

Finals
Barcelona Sorli Discau	4	3 (4)	0	5
Alnimar Reus Deportiu	2	3 (3)	2	0

== Final standings ==
Pos	Team	Qualification or relegation
1	Barcelona Sorli Discau	CERH European League
2	Alnimar Reus Deportiu	CERH European League
3	Noia Freixenet	CERH European League
4	Roncato Vic	CERH European League
5	Hormipresa Igualada	CERS Cup
6	Vilanova L'Ull Blau	CERS Cup
7	Lloret	CERS Cup
8	Liceo Vodafone	
9	Viva Hàbitat Blanes	
10	Cemex Tenerife	
11	Enrile PAS Alcoy	
12	Leche Celta Voltregà	
13	Astra Pool Maçanet	
14	Cysugal Vigo Stick	Relegation to Primera División
15	Aiscondel Vila-seca	Relegation to Primera División
16	Lleida Llista Blava	Relegation to Primera División

== Copa del Rey ==
2005 Copa del Rey
Tournament details
- Arena: Pavelló Olímpic, Reus
- Dates: 10–13 March 2005

Final positions
- Champions: Barcelona Sorli Discau
- Runners-up: Roncato Vic

The 2005 Copa del Rey was the 62nd edition of the Spanish men's roller hockey cup. It was played in Reus between the eight first qualified teams after the first half of the season.

Barcelona Sorli Discau won the title.

Quarterfinals
10 March
Noia Freixenet	0
Roncato Vic	3
10 March
Alnimar Reus Deportiu	8
Enrile PAS Alcoy	3
11 March
Lloret	4
Vilanova L'Ull Blau	2
11 March
Barcelona Sorli Discau	6
Hormipresa Igualada	3

Semifinals
12 March
Roncato Vic	4
Alnimar Reus Deportiu	3
12 March
Lloret	3
Barcelona Sorli Discau	4

Final
13 March
Roncato Vic	0
Barcelona Sorli Discau	2
