= Carles Trullols i Clemente =

Spanish roller hockey player and coach (1948–2021)

Carles Trullols i Clemente (17 September 1948 – 12 April 2021) was a Spanish roller hockey player and coach, called the best goalkeeper of his time.

== Biography and career ==
Trullols was born in Barcelona on 17 September 1948. He was member of the teams CP Magnetos between 1965 and 1967, CE Vendrell between 1967 and 1969, RCD Espanyol Hoquei between 1969 and 1971, Cerdanyola CH between 1971 and 1975 and CP Vilanova between 1975 and 1977. But he was especially outstanding at FC Barcelona Hoquei where he spent 6 seasons and won 19 titles, including 6 European Cups and 5 Spanish Leagues. He also played for the Spanish national team 193 times, winning the World Championship four times and the European Championship four more times. He also coached the national team between 1987 and 1990 in which he won the 1989 World Cup in Argentina, and again in 1992, and also Catalunya U21 in 1990.

He received on 24 February 1984, the year he retired, the Golden Medal of Sports Merit from the hands of Romà Cuyàs, then State Secretary of Sports.

== Achievements ==
He had a successful career with the following prizes:

=== With FC Barcelona ===
- 6 Euro Cups: 1977–78, 1978–79, 1979–80, 1980–81, 1981–82, 1982–83.
- 5 Spanish leagues: 1977–78, 1978–79, 1979–80, 1980–81, 1981–82.
- 3 Copa del Rey de Hockey Patines: 1977–78, 1978–79, 1980–81.
- 4 Continental Cups: 1979–80, 1980–81, 1981–82, 1982–83.
- 1 Roller Hockey Intercontinental Cup: 1983.

=== With national team ===
- 6 Nations Cups: 1967, 1971, 1975, 1976, 1978, 1980.
- 4 Roller Hockey World Cups: 1970, 1972, 1976, 1980.
- 4 Rink Hockey European Championships: 1969, 1979, 1981, 1983.
- 1 CERH European U-20 Roller Hockey Championship: 1966.

== Death ==
He died on the night of 12 April 2021, in Barcelona at the age of 72 from COVID-19 during the COVID-19 pandemic in Spain.
