= 2005–06 OK Liga =

- League: OK Liga
- Sport: Roller hockey
- League champions: Barcelona Sorli Discau
- Runners-up: Alnimar Reus Deportiu
- Relegated to Primera División: Tordera; Oviedo; Caixa Penedès Vilafranca

OK Liga seasons
- ← 2004–05 2006–07 →

The 2005–06 OK Liga was the 37th season of the top-tier league of rink hockey in Spain.

Barcelona Sorli Discau finished the league as champion.

== Competition format ==
Sixteen teams joined the league.

The eight first teams at the end of the regular season qualified for the playoffs while the three last teams were relegated to Primera División.

== Regular season ==
Pos	Team	Pld	W	D	L	GF	GA	GD	Pts	Qualification or relegation
1	Barcelona Sorli Discau	30	24	2	4	151	56	+95	74	Qualification to playoffs
2	Alnimar Reus Deportiu	30	20	5	5	94	53	+41	65	Qualification to playoffs
3	Roncato Vic	30	15	8	7	101	75	+26	53	Qualification to playoffs
4	Hormipresa Igualada	30	15	4	11	92	78	+14	49	Qualification to playoffs
5	Vilanova L'Ull Blau	30	15	4	11	82	71	+11	49	Qualification to playoffs
6	Cemex Tenerife	30	14	4	12	80	85	−5	46	Qualification to playoffs
7	Noia Freixenet	30	12	7	11	86	73	+13	43	Qualification to playoffs
8	Astra Pool Maçanet	30	13	4	13	69	80	−11	43	Qualification to playoffs
9	Liceo Vodafone	30	12	6	12	87	79	+8	42	
10	Viva Hàbitat Blanes	30	11	5	14	72	88	−16	38	
11	Enrile PAS Alcoy	30	10	6	14	70	88	−18	36	
12	Leche Celta Voltregà	30	10	5	15	67	90	−23	35	
13	Lloret	30	8	9	13	69	98	−29	33	
14	Tordera	30	9	5	16	62	86	−24	32	Relegation to Primera División
15	Oviedo	30	6	7	17	66	94	−28	25	Relegation to Primera División
16	Caixa Penedès Vilafranca	30	4	4	22	53	107	−54	16	Relegation to Primera División

== Playoffs ==
Quarterfinals were played with a best-of-three format, while semifinals and final were played with a best-of-five series.

Seeded teams played games 1, 2 and 5 of the series at home.

Quarterfinals
Barcelona Sorli Discau	9	7	4
Astra Pool Maçanet	4	1	1
Hormipresa Igualada	3	7	3	1
Vilanova L'Ull Blau	0	1	4	0
Alnimar Reus Deportiu	2	1	5
Noia Freixenet	0	0	1
Roncato Vic	7	4	0	3
Cemex Tenerife	2	0	2	2

Semifinals
Barcelona Sorli Discau	5	4	4
Hormipresa Igualada	3	3	0
Alnimar Reus Deportiu	3	3	6
Roncato Vic	1	2	4

Finals
Barcelona Sorli Discau	3	5	5	3
Alnimar Reus Deportiu	1	3	6	2

== Final standings ==
Pos	Team	Qualification or relegation
1	Barcelona Sorli Discau	CERH European League
2	Alnimar Reus Deportiu	CERH European League
3	Roncato Vic	CERH European League
4	Hormipresa Igualada	CERS Cup
5	Vilanova L'Ull Blau	CERS Cup
6	Cemex Tenerife	CERS Cup
7	Noia Freixenet	
8	Astra Pool Maçanet	
9	Liceo Vodafone	
10	Viva Hàbitat Blanes	
11	Enrile PAS Alcoy	
12	Leche Celta Voltregà	
13	Lloret	
14	Tordera	Relegation to Primera División
15	Oviedo	Relegation to Primera División
16	Caixa Penedès Vilafranca	Relegation to Primera División

== Copa del Rey ==
2006 Copa del Rey
Tournament details
- Arena: Pavelló Municipal d'Esports, Lloret de Mar
- Dates: 9–12 March 2007

Final positions
- Champions: Alnimar Reus Deportiu
- Runners-up: Barcelona Sorli Discau

The 2006 Copa del Rey was the 63rd edition of the Spanish men's roller hockey cup. It was played in Lloret de Mar between the seven first qualified teams after the first half of the season and Lloret as host team.

23 years after its last title, Alnimar Reus Deportiu won its 6th cup.

Quarterfinals
9 March
Barcelona Sorli Discau	5
Astra Pool Maçanet	1
9 March
Lloret	1
Hormipresa Igualada	2
10 March
Alnimar Reus Deportiu	5
Vilanova L'Ull Blau	0
10 March
Roncato Vic	3
Cemex Tenerife	1

Semifinals
11 March
Barcelona Sorli Discau	5
Hormipresa Igualada	3
11 March
Alnimar Reus Deportiu	3
Roncato Vic	2

Final
12 March
Barcelona Sorli Discau	2
Alnimar Reus Deportiu	3
