= FC Barcelona Hoquei =

Hockey section of the FC Barcelona sports club

Barcelona Hoquei
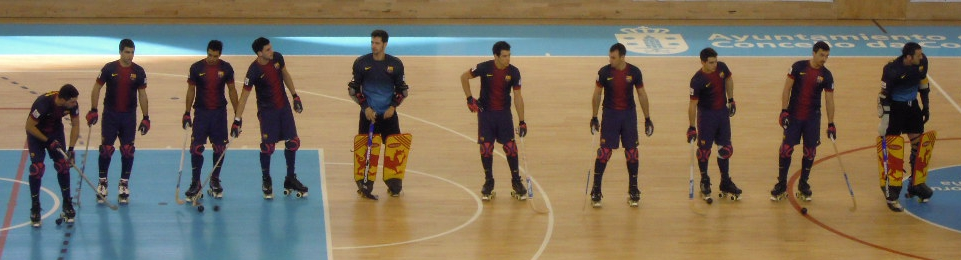
- Full name: Futbol Club Barcelona Hoquei
- League: OK Liga
- Founded: 1942
- Home ground: Palau Blaugrana; Barcelona, Spain (Capacity 8,000)

Personnel
- Coach: Edu Castro
- Chairman: Vacant
- Website: www.fcbarcelona.com/en/roller-hockey/
Home	Away

Futbol Club Barcelona Hoquei is a professional roller hockey team based in Barcelona, Spain. It is part of the FC Barcelona multi-sport club and plays in the OK Liga. It is the most successful roller hockey club in Spain and Europe with a record number of domestic, european and intercontinental titles.

== History ==
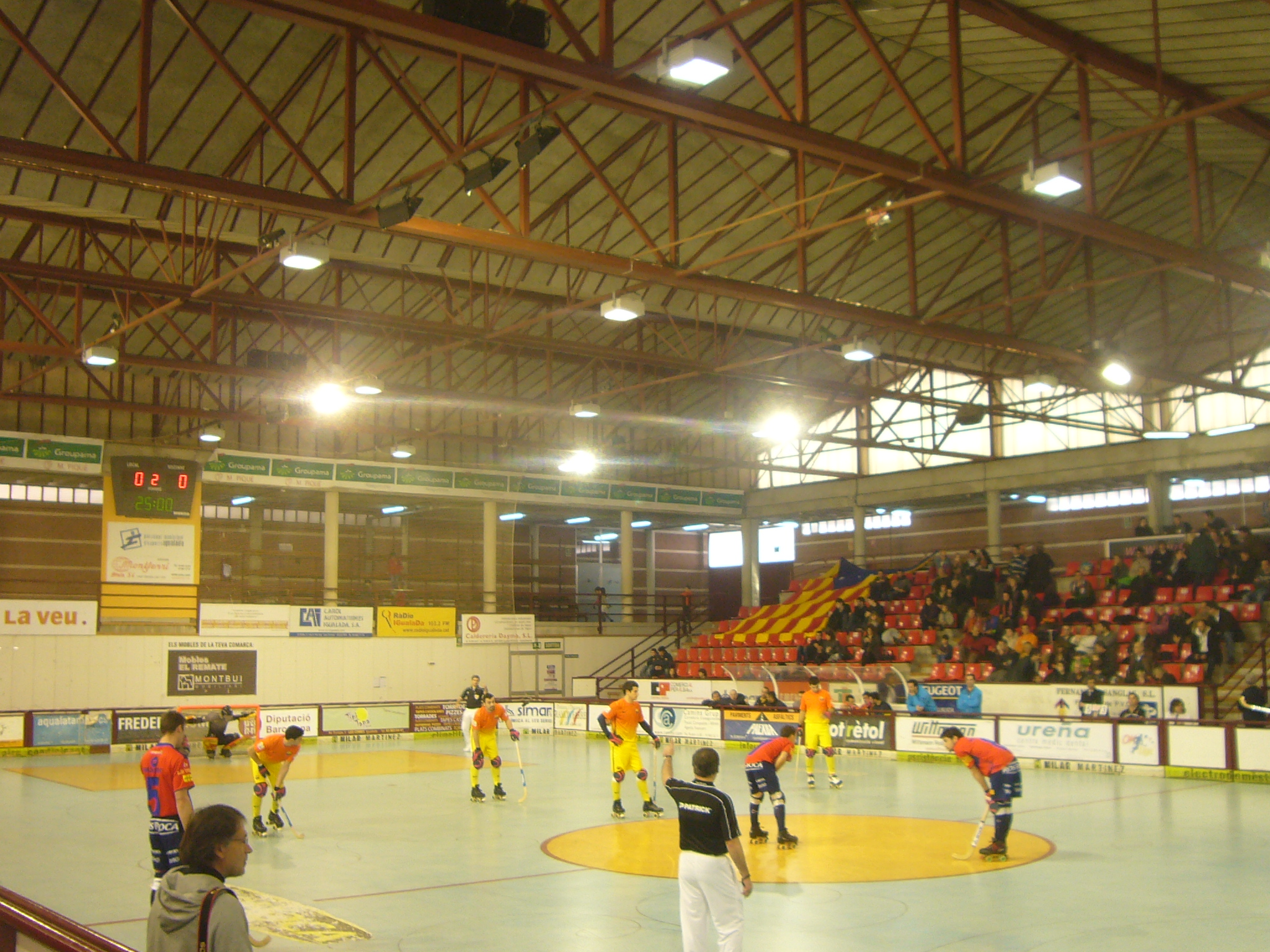
FC Barcelona Hoquei game against Igualada HC

The roller hockey section was founded in 1942 but due to problems with its venue, it played only one season until 1948, beginning the great history of this section. In terms of trophies, Barcelona are the most successful team in Europe having won 22 European Cups.

== Season to season ==
Season	Tier	Division	Pos.	Copa del Rey	Supercopa	Europe	
2001–02	1	OK Liga	1st	Champion	—N/a	1 European League	C
2002–03	1	OK Liga	1st	Champion	—N/a	1 European League	SF
2003–04	1	OK Liga	1st	Semifinalist	—N/a	1 European League	C
2004–05	1	OK Liga	1st	Champion	Champion	1 European League	C
2005–06	1	OK Liga	1st	Runner-up	Champion	2 CERS Cup	C
2006–07	1	OK Liga	1st	Champion	Runner-up	1 European League	C
2007–08	1	OK Liga	1st	Quarterfinalist	Champion	1 European League	C
2008–09	1	OK Liga	1st	Runner-up	Champion	1 European League	QF
2009–10	1	OK Liga	1st	Semifinalist	Runner-up	1 European League	C
2010–11	1	OK Liga	3rd	Champion	Runner-up	1 European League	QF
2011–12	1	OK Liga	1st	Champion	Champion	1 European League	RU
2012–13	1	OK Liga	2nd	Semifinalist	Champion	1 European League	SF
2013–14	1	OK Liga	1st	Runner-up	Champion	1 European League	C
2014–15	1	OK Liga	1st	Runner-up	Champion	1 European League	C
2015–16	1	OK Liga	1st	Champion	Champion	1 European League	SF
2016–17	1	OK Liga	1st	Champion	Semifinalist	1 European League	SF
2017–18	1	OK Liga	1st	Champion	Champion	1 European League	C
2018–19	1	OK Liga	1st	Champion	Runner-up	1 European League	SF
2019–20	1	OK Liga	1st	Not played	Runner-up	1 European League	—
2020–21	1	OK Liga	1st	Runner-up	Champion	1 European League	QP
2021–22	1	OK Liga	2nd	Champion	Runner-up		
2022–23	1	OK Liga	1st	Champion	Champion	1 Champions League	SF
2023–24	1	OK Liga	1st	Champion	Champion	1 Champions League	QF
2024–25	1	OK Liga	1st	Quarterfinalist	Champion	1 Champions League	GS
2025–26	1	OK Liga			Champion	1 Champions League	

== Trophies ==
=== Spain ===
- OK Liga: 35 (record)
  - 1973–74, 1976–77, 1977–78, 1978–79, 1979–80, 1980–81, 1981–82, 1983–84, 1984–85, 1995–96, 1997–98, 1998–99, 1999–00, 2000–01, 2001–02, 2002–03, 2003–04, 2004–05, 2005–06, 2006–07, 2007–08, 2008–09, 2009–10, 2011–12, 2013–14, 2014–15, 2015–16, 2016–17, 2017–18, 2018–19, 2019–20, 2020–21, 2022–23, 2023–24, 2024–25
- Copa del Rey: 26 (record)
  - 1953, 1958, 1963, 1972, 1975, 1978, 1979, 1981, 1985, 1986, 1987, 1994, 2000, 2002, 2003, 2005, 2007, 2011, 2012, 2016, 2017, 2018, 2019, 2022, 2023, 2024
- Spanish Super Cup: 15 (record)
  - 2004, 2005, 2007, 2008, 2011, 2012, 2013, 2014, 2015, 2017, 2020, 2022, 2023, 2024, 2025

=== European ===
- Champions League: 22 (record)
  - 1972–73, 1973–74, 1977–78, 1978–79, 1979–80, 1980–81, 1981–82, 1982–83, 1983–84, 1984–85, 1996–97, 1999–2000, 2000–01, 2001–02, 2003–04, 2004–05, 2006–07, 2007–08, 2009–10, 2013–14, 2014–15, 2017–18
- CERH Cup Winner's Cup: 1
  - 1986–87
- WSE Cup: 1
  - 2005–06
- Continental Cup: 18 (record)
  - 1980, 1981, 1982, 1983, 1984, 1985, 1997, 2000, 2001, 2002, 2004, 2005, 2006, 2007, 2008, 2010, 2015, 2018
- CERH Ciudad de Vigo Tournament: 5
  - 1997, 2000, 2001, 2004, 2007
- Nations Cup: 3
  - 1978, 1980, 1995
- Iberian Cup: 3 (record)
  - 1999–00, 2000–01, 2001–02

=== Intercontinental ===
- Intercontinental Cup: 7 (record)
  - 1983, 1998, 2005, 2008, 2014, 2018, 2024

=== Regional ===
- Catalan League: 9 (record)
  - 1994–95, 1996–97, 1997–98, 1998–99, 2018–19, 2019–20, 2020–21, 2021–22, 2023–24
- Catalonia Championship: 2
  - 1957, 1960

== Famous coaches ==
- Carlos Figueroa
- Josep Lorente
- Joaquim Paüls

== Famous players ==
- Ramón Benito
- Joaquim Paüls
- Gaby Cairo
- José Luis Páez
- Jordi Vila-Puig
- Carles Trullols
- Jordi Villacorta
- Joan Torner
- Josep Enric Torner
