= 2006 FIRS Intercontinental Cup =

Tournament details
- Host country: Spain
- City: Alcoy
- Dates: April 1, 2006
- Teams: 2

Final positions
- Champions: (Spain) FC Barcelona (3rd title)
- Runners-up: (Argentina) Olimpia PC

Tournament statistics
- Matches played: 1
- Goals scored: 11 (11 per match)

The 2006 FIRS Intercontinental Cup was the ninth edition of the roller hockey tournament known as the Intercontinental Cup, played on April 1, 2006 at Alcoy, Spain. This edition rolled back to a one-legged final again. FC Barcelona won the cup, defeating Olimpia PC.

== Match ==
April 1, 2006
April 1, 2006	FC Barcelona (Spain)	8 – 3	(Argentina) Olimpia PC	Alcoy, Spain

== See also ==
- FIRS Intercontinental Cup
