= 2008 FIRS Intercontinental Cup =

Tournament details
- Host country: Spain
- City: Molins de Rei
- Dates: September 29, 2008
- Teams: 2

Final positions
- Champions: (Spain) FC Barcelona (4th title)
- Runners-up: (Argentina) Concepción PC

Tournament statistics
- Matches played: 1
- Goals scored: 4 (4 per match)

The 2008 FIRS Intercontinental Cup was the eleventh edition of the roller hockey tournament known as the Intercontinental Cup, played on September 29, 2008, at Molins de Rei, Spain. FC Barcelona won the cup, defeating Concepción PC.

== Match ==
September 29, 2008
September 29, 2008	FC Barcelona (Spain)	3 – 1	(Argentina) Concepción PC	Molins de Rei, Spain

== See also ==
- FIRS Intercontinental Cup
