= 2002–03 OK Liga =

- League: OK Liga
- Sport: Roller hockey
- League champions: Barcelona
- Runners-up: Noia Freixenet
- Relegated to Primera División: AstralPool Maçanet; Distrito Macarena; Caixa Penedès Vilafranca

OK Liga seasons
- ← 2001–02 2003–04 →

The 2002–03 OK Liga was the 34th season of the top-tier league of rink hockey in Spain.

Barcelona finished the league as champion, after beating Noia Freixenet 3–0 in the finals. Noia Freixenet ended in the 12th position at the end of the regular season.

== Competition format ==
Sixteen teams joined the league. The three first teams at the end of the regular season qualified directly for the quarterfinals while teams from fourth to 13th joined the round of 16.

The three last teams were relegated to Primera División.

== Regular season ==
| Pos | Team | Pld | W | D | L | GF | GA | GD | Pts | Qualification or relegation |
|---|---|---|---|---|---|---|---|---|---|---|
| 1 | Barcelona | 30 | 24 | 3 | 3 | 140 | 62 | +78 | 75 | Qualification to quarterfinals |
| 2 | Vic | 30 | 19 | 5 | 6 | 101 | 62 | +39 | 62 | Qualification to quarterfinals |
| 3 | Barna Work Igualada | 30 | 19 | 4 | 7 | 110 | 62 | +48 | 61 | Qualification to quarterfinals |
| 4 | Viva Hàbitat Blanes | 30 | 18 | 2 | 10 | 85 | 62 | +23 | 56 | Qualification to round of 16 |
| 5 | Arenamar Reus Deportiu | 30 | 15 | 7 | 8 | 83 | 76 | +7 | 52 | Qualification to round of 16 |
| 6 | Lleida Llista Blava | 30 | 16 | 4 | 10 | 105 | 75 | +30 | 52 | Qualification to round of 16 |
| 7 | Liceo Vodafone | 30 | 15 | 6 | 9 | 109 | 88 | +21 | 51 | Qualification to round of 16 |
| 8 | Motul Voltregà | 30 | 11 | 7 | 12 | 83 | 73 | +10 | 40 | Qualification to round of 16 |
| 9 | Cemex Tenerife | 30 | 11 | 4 | 15 | 74 | 90 | −16 | 37 | Qualification to round of 16 |
| 10 | Grup Lloret | 30 | 10 | 5 | 15 | 108 | 121 | −13 | 35 | Qualification to round of 16 |
| 11 | Noia Freixenet | 30 | 10 | 5 | 15 | 72 | 89 | −17 | 35 | Qualification to round of 16 |
| 12 | Century21 Alcobendas | 30 | 10 | 3 | 17 | 89 | 120 | −31 | 33 | Qualification to round of 16 |
| 13 | Vilanova RSM | 30 | 7 | 8 | 15 | 75 | 108 | −33 | 29 | Qualification to round of 16 |
| 14 | AstralPool Maçanet | 30 | 7 | 5 | 18 | 66 | 97 | −31 | 26 | Relegation to Primera División |
| 15 | Distrito Macarena | 30 | 6 | 3 | 21 | 65 | 127 | −62 | 21 | Relegation to Primera División |
| 16 | Caixa Penedès Vilafranca | 30 | 5 | 3 | 22 | 74 | 127 | −53 | 18 | Relegation to Primera División |

== Playoffs ==
Quarterfinals were played with a best-of-three format, while semifinals and final were played with a best-of-five series.

Seeded teams played games 1, 2 and 5 of the series at home.

Round of 16
Motul Voltregà | 2 | 5 | 4
Cemex Tenerife | 1 | 4 | 3
Viva Hàbitat Blanes | 4 | 3 | 2 | 6
Vilanova RSM | 2 | 2 | 2 | 2
Arenamar Reus Dep. | 7 | 3 | 2 | 6
Century21 Alcobendas | 2 | 2 | 3 | 4
Liceo Vodafone | 2 | 2 | 2 | 3 | 4
Grup Lloret | 6 | 7 | 0 | 3 | 5
Lleida Llista Blava | 6 | 4 | 2 | 3 | 4
Noia Freixenet | 2 | 3 | 3 | 5 | 5

Quarterfinals
Barcelona | 5 | 7 | 3
Motul Voltregà | 3 | 2 | 2
Viva Hàbitat Blanes | 5 | 4 | 1 | 3
Arenamar Reus Dep. | 3 | 6 | 5 | 4
Vic | 3 | 5 | 5
Grup Lloret | 1 | 3 | 1
Barna Work Igualada | 1 | 3 | 1 | 1
Noia Freixenet | 1 | 2 | 2 | 2

Semifinals
Barcelona | 2 | 3 | 4(2)
Arenamar Reus Deportiu | 1 | 2 | 4(1)
Vic | 6 | 2 | 3 | 2 | 2
Noia Freixenet | 5 | 4 | 0 | 5 | 4

Finals
Barcelona | 6 | 3 | 3
Noia Freixenet | 0 | 2 | 2

== Final standings ==
| Pos | Team | Qualification or relegation |
|---|---|---|
| 1 | Barcelona | CERH European League |
| 2 | Noia Freixenet | CERH European League |
| 3 | Vic | CERH European League |
| 4 | Arenamar Reus Deportiu | CERS Cup |
| 5 | Barna Work Igualada | CERS Cup |
| 6 | Viva Hàbitat Blanes | CERS Cup |
| 7 | Motul Voltregà | CERS Cup |
| 8 | Grup Lloret | |
| 9 | Lleida Llista Blava | |
| 10 | Liceo Vodafone (Note: Liceo Vodafone qualified as 2002–03 CERH European League champion.) | CERH European League |
| 11 | Cemex Tenerife | |
| 12 | Century21 Alcobendas | |
| 13 | Vilanova RSM | |
| 14 | AstraPool Maçanet | Relegation to Primera División |
| 15 | Distrito Macarena | Relegation to Primera División |
| 16 | Caixa Penedès Vilafranca | Relegation to Primera División |

== Copa del Rey ==
2004 Copa del Rey
Tournament details
- Arena: Vilanova i la Geltrú
- Dates: 13–16 March 2003

Final positions
- Champions: Barcelona
- Runners-up: Vic

The 2003 Copa del Rey was the 60th edition of the Spanish men's roller hockey cup. It was played in Vilanova i la Geltrú between the seven first qualified teams after the first half of the season and Vilanova RMS as host team.

Barcelona won their 15th trophy.

Quarterfinals
13 March
Barna Work Igualada | 6
Motul Voltregà | 3
13 March
Barcelona | 3
Lleida Llista Blava | 2
14 March
Vic | 3
Viva Hàbitat Blanes | 1
14 March
Liceo Vodafone | 3
Vilanova RSM | 4

Semifinals
15 March
Barna Work Igualada | 3
Barcelona | 4
15 March
Roncato Vic | 3
Vilanova RSM | 1

Final
16 March
Barcelona | 2
Vic | 0
