= 2009–10 OK Liga =

- League: OK Liga
- Sport: Roller hockey
- League champions: Barcelona Sorli Discau
- Runners-up: Coinasa Liceo
- Relegated to Primera División: Cerceda; Grup Castillo Lleida; Astra Pool Maçanet; Caixa Penedès Vilafranca

OK Liga seasons
- ← 2008–09 2010–11 →

The 2009–10 OK Liga was the 41st season of the top-tier league of rink hockey in Spain.

Barcelona Sorli Discau finished the league as champion.

== Competition format ==
Sixteen teams joined the league.

For this season, the playoffs were abolished and four teams would be relegated to Primera División with the aim of reducing the league to only 14 teams.

== League table ==
Pos	Team	Pld	W	D	L	GF	GA	GD	Pts	Qualification or relegation
1	Barcelona Sorli Discau	30	25	1	4	146	63	+83	76	Qualification to European League
2	Coinasa Liceo	30	23	3	4	159	79	+80	72	Qualification to European League
3	Roncato Vic	30	22	4	4	123	77	+46	70	Qualification to European League
4	Tecnol Reus Deportiu	30	16	5	9	133	99	+34	53	Qualification to European League
5	Grup Lloret	30	16	4	10	101	87	+14	52	Qualification to CERS Cup
6	Vilanova L'Ull Blau	30	15	7	8	122	112	+10	52	Qualification to CERS Cup
7	Noia Freixenet	30	13	4	13	105	107	−2	43	Qualification to European League
8	Cemento Teide Tenerife	30	12	5	13	102	99	+3	41	Qualification to CERS Cup
9	Sather Blanes	30	11	5	14	107	108	−1	38	Qualification to European League
10	Proinosa Igualada	30	9	7	14	104	117	−13	34	Qualification to European League
11	Enrile PAS Alcoy	30	9	5	16	113	143	−30	32	Qualification to CERS Cup
12	GEiEG Sidorme Hotels	30	10	2	18	99	112	−13	32	Qualification to CERS Cup
13	Cerceda	30	9	4	17	94	133	−39	31	Relegation to Primera División
14	Grup Castillo Lleida	30	9	3	18	98	138	−40	30	Relegation to Primera División
15	Astra Pool Maçanet	30	5	3	22	80	148	−68	18	Relegation to Primera División
16	Caixa Penedès Vilafranca	30	3	4	23	75	139	−64	13	Relegation to Primera División

== Copa del Rey ==
2010 Copa del Rey
Tournament details
- Arena: Pavelló Municipal d'Esports, Lloret de Mar
- Dates: 25–28 February 2010

Final positions
- Champions: Roncato Vic (3rd title)
- Runners-up: Vilanova L'Ull Blau

The 2010 Copa del Rey was the 67th edition of the Spanish men's roller hockey cup. It was played in Lloret de Mar between the eight first qualified teams after the first half of the season.

Roncato Vic defended successfully its title and won its 3rd cup.

Quarterfinals
25 February
Coinasa Liceo	4
Cemento Telde Tenerife	2
25 February
Vilanova L'Ull Blau	6
Grup Lloret	1
26 February
Roncato Vic	3
Noia Freixenet	0
26 February
Barcelona Sorli Discau	6
Tecnol Reus Deportiu	1

Semifinals
27 February
Coinasa Liceo	3
Vilanova L'Ull Blau	4
27 February
Roncato Vic	1 (2)
Barcelona Sorli Discau	1 (1)

Final
28 February
Vilanova L'Ull Blau	2
Roncato Vic	4
