= 2001–02 CERH European League =

Tournament details
- Teams: 17

Final positions
- Champions: Barcelona (15th title)
- Runners-up: Barcelos

The 2001–02 CERH European League was the 37th edition of the CERH European League organized by CERH. Its Final Four was held on 27 and 28 April 2002 in Guimarães, Portugal.

== Preliminary round ==
| Team 1 | Agg. | Team 2 | 1st leg | 2nd leg |
|---|---|---|---|---|
| Wolfurt (Austria) | 6–10 | (Netherlands) Valkenswaardse | 5–5 | 1–5 |

== First round ==
| Team 1 | Agg. | Team 2 | 1st leg | 2nd leg |
|---|---|---|---|---|
| Benfica (Portugal) | 58–4 | (Netherlands) Valkenswaardse | 36–1 | 22–3 |
| Blanes (Spain) | 3–6 | (Portugal) Barcelos | 2–1 | 1–5 |
| Quévert (France) | 8–7 | (Switzerland) Genève | 5–5 | 3–2 |
| Saint-Omer (France) | 2–14 | (Italy) Novara | 1–7 | 1–7 |
| Thunerstern (Switzerland) | 0–13 | (Spain) Barcelona | 0–6 | 0–7 |
| La Vendéenne (France) | 0–14 | (Italy) Bassano | 0–7 | 0–7 |
| Vic (Spain) | 7–4 | (Italy) Prato | 3–1 | 4–3 |
| Porto (Portugal) | 1–2 | (Spain) Reus Deportiu | 1–1 | 0–1 |

== Group stage ==
In each group, teams played against each other home-and-away in a home-and-away round-robin format.

The two first qualified teams advanced to the Final Four.

=== Group A ===
| Pos | Team | Pld | W | D | L | GF | GA | GD | Pts | Qualification | BEN | REU | NOV | QUE |
|---|---|---|---|---|---|---|---|---|---|---|---|---|---|---|
| 1 | (Portugal) Benfica | 6 | 4 | 1 | 1 | 34 | 17 | +17 | 9 | Advance to Final Four | — | 7–1 | 3–1 | 8–3 |
| 2 | (Spain) Reus Deportiu | 6 | 2 | 3 | 1 | 14 | 18 | −4 | 7 | Advance to Final Four | 5–4 | — | 2–2 | 3–2 |
| 3 | (Italy) Novara | 6 | 1 | 3 | 2 | 22 | 20 | +2 | 5 | | 5–5 | 2–2 | — | 7–8 |
| 4 | (France) Quévert | 6 | 1 | 1 | 4 | 16 | 31 | −15 | 3 | | 2–7 | 1–1 | 0–5 | — |

=== Group B ===
| Pos | Team | Pld | W | D | L | GF | GA | GD | Pts | Qualification | BCS | BAR | VIC | BAS |
|---|---|---|---|---|---|---|---|---|---|---|---|---|---|---|
| 1 | (Portugal) Barcelos | 6 | 4 | 1 | 1 | 25 | 17 | +8 | 9 | Advance to Final Four | — | 3–1 | 3–3 | 7–1 |
| 2 | (Spain) Barcelona | 6 | 4 | 0 | 2 | 27 | 9 | +18 | 8 | Advance to Final Four | 8–0 | — | 2–3 | 6–0 |
| 3 | (Spain) Vic | 6 | 1 | 2 | 3 | 13 | 20 | −7 | 4 | | 1–4 | 2–6 | — | 1–1 |
| 4 | (Italy) Bassano | 6 | 1 | 1 | 4 | 10 | 29 | −19 | 3 | | 3–8 | 1–4 | 4–3 | — |

== Final four ==
The Final Four was played in the Pavilhão Multiusos of Guimarães, Portugal.

Barcelona achieved its 15th title, by winning their two games after a penalty shootout.

=== Bracket ===
Semifinals
27 April
(Portugal) Barcelos | 2
(Spain) Reus Deportiu | 1
27 April
(Portugal) Benfica | 2 (2)
(Spain) Barcelona | 2 (4)

Final
28 April
(Portugal) Barcelos | 1 (1)
(Spain) Barcelona | 1 (2)
