= 1998 FIRS Intercontinental Cup =

Tournament details
- Host country: Spain
- City: Barcelona
- Dates: 3 May 1998
- Teams: 2

Final positions
- Champions: (Spain) FC Barcelona (2nd title)
- Runners-up: (Argentina) Unión Vecinal de Trinidad

Tournament statistics
- Matches played: 1
- Goals scored: 14 (14 per match)

The 1998 FIRS Intercontinental Cup was the seventh edition of the roller hockey tournament known as the Intercontinental Cup, played in May 1998. This edition was disputed, for the first time, over one game only. FC Barcelona won the cup, defeating Unión Vecinal de Trinidad.

== Match ==
3 May 1998
3 May 1998	FC Barcelona (Spain)	13 – 1	(Argentina) Unión Vecinal de Trinidad	Barcelona, Spain

== See also ==
- FIRS Intercontinental Cup
