= 1983 FIRS Intercontinental Cup =

Tournament details
- Host country: Brazil
- City: Sertãozinho
- Dates: February, 1983
- Teams: 8

Final positions
- Champions: (Spain) FC Barcelona (1st title)
- Runners-up: (Portugal) FC Porto
- Third place: (Chile) LE Manuel de Salas
- Fourth place: (Brazil) Sertãozinho HC

Tournament statistics
- Matches played: 28
- Goals scored: 197 (7.04 per match)

The 1983 Intercontinental Cup was the inaugural roller hockey tournament known as the Intercontinental Cup, played in February 1983. This first edition saw a very different format compared with the other editions, as there were 8 teams (2 teams from Europe, 2 from Brazil, 2 from Argentina and 2 from Chile) playing a round robin pool, each team competing against every other. FC Barcelona won the tournament, above FC Porto. This edition wasn't official until it was recognize by World Skate in 2018.

== Results ==
Teams	MSa	TBa	Por	Est	Ser	SMa	Bar
(Chile) CE Manuel de Salas	X						
(Chile) CD Thomas Bata	5–5	X					
(Portugal) FC Porto	4–4	10–5	X				
(Argentina) CDU Estudiantil	3–7	5–4	4–10	X			
(Brazil) Sertãozinho HC	6–1	8–1	5–9	2–2	X		
(Argentina) Club San Martín	D/V	D/D	4–10	2–0	2–1	X	
(Spain) FC Barcelona	10–2	8–3	4–1	V/D	4–0	3–0	X
(Brazil) Portuguesa	3–7	2–6	4–10	D/D	D/V	1–2	1–7

== Standings ==
Key to colors
Winner, Intercontinental Champion

Team	Pld	W	D	L	GF	GA	GD	Pts
(gold) (Spain) FC Barcelona	7	7	0	0	36	7	+29	14
(silver) (Portugal) FC Porto	7	5	1	1	54	30	+24	11
(bronze) (Chile) CE Manuel de Salas	7	3	2	2	26	31	−5	8
(Brazil) Sertãozinho HC	7	3	1	3	22	19	+3	7
(Argentina) Club San Martín	7	3	1	3	10	15	−7	7
(Argentina) CDU Estudiantil	7	1	2	4	14	25	−4	7
(Chile) CD Thomas Bata	7	1	2	4	24	38	−4	3
(Brazil) Portuguesa	7	0	1	6	11	32	−1	0

== See also ==
- FIRS Intercontinental Cup
