= CE Lleida Llista Blava =

Lleida Llista Blava
- Full name: Club Esportiu Lleida Llista Blava
- Nickname(s): Listados, Llistats
- League: OK Liga
- Founded: 6 April 1951
- Home ground: Pavelló Onze de Setembre, Lleida, Catalonia, Spain (Capacity 2,200)

Personnel
- Chairman: (Spain) Enric Duch
- Manager: (Spain) Albert Folguera
Home	Away

Club Esportiu Lleida Llista Blava, also known as ICG Software Lleida for sponsorship reasons, is a Spanish rink hockey club based in Lleida, in the autonomous community of Catalonia. Founded in 1951, the club currently plays in the OK Liga, holding its home games at the Pavelló Onze de Setembre, with capacity of 2,000 seats.

== History ==
Founded on 6 April 1951 with the name Lérida Lista Azul by a group of friends, the club promoted for the first time to the honour division in 1956. In its first season in it, Lleida ended the league in the fourth position, and would continue playing in the top tier until its relegation in 1960.

In 1993 the team translates its name to Catalan and changes it to the current Lleida Llista Blava. In 2000, it comes back to the OK Liga, in that time called División de Honor and in 2003 makes its debut in European competition. In its first experience, the club reaches the final of the CERS Cup, but fails to win it after losing against Reus Deportiu.

In 2005, Lleida repeated participation, but this time was eliminated by Hockey Breganze in the round of 16. That season was a disaster as the club relegated to Primera División, but immediately comes back to OK Liga. Four years later, in 2010, Lleida Llista Blava would be relegated again, but after spending two seasons in the second tier, promoted again and consolidates as an OK Liga team.

In 2013 took place the third participation of the club in the CERS Cup, eliminated again in the round of 16, this time by Italian Forte dei Marmi.

On 29 April 2018, Lleida conquered their first European title by winning after a penalty shootout the 2017–18 CERS Cup, played at home, against Portuguese team Óquei Clube de Barcelos. They repeated achievement in the following season, again at home and this time defeating Italian squad Sarzana by 6–3.

== Season to season ==
Season	Tier	Division	Pos.	Copa del Rey	Europe	
2001–02	1	OK Liga	7th	Semifinalist		
2002–03	1	OK Liga	9th	Quarterfinalist	2 CERS Cup	RU
2003–04	1	OK Liga	7th	Quarterfinalist		
2004–05	1	OK Liga	16th		2 CERS Cup	R16
2005–06	2	1ª División	3rd			
2006–07	1	OK Liga	13th			
2007–08	1	OK Liga	11th			
2008–09	1	OK Liga	8th	Quarterfinalist		
2009–10	1	OK Liga	14th			
2010–11	2	1ª División	12th			
2011–12	2	1ª División	4th			
2012–13	1	OK Liga	7th	Quarterfinalist		
2013–14	1	OK Liga	13th	Quarterfinalist	2 CERS Cup	R16
2014–15	1	OK Liga	11th			
2015–16	1	OK Liga	13th			
2016–17	1	OK Liga	9th			
2017–18	1	OK Liga	5th	Quarterfinalist	2 CERS Cup	C
2018–19	1	OK Liga	6th	Semifinalist	2 WS Europe Cup	C

== Titles ==
- World Skate Europe Cup: (4)
  - 2018, 2019, 2021, 2026.

== Squad ==
No.		Position	Player
1	(Spain)	GK	Elagi seitg
3	(France)	FW	Bruno di Benedetto
4	(Spain)	DF/MF	Joan Cañellas
7	(Argentina)	FW	Maxi Oruste
9	(Spain)	DF/MF	Uri conony

No.		Position	Player
10	(Spain)	GK
14	(Spain)	FW	Jordi Creus
51	(Spain)	DF/MF	Raúl Fernández
68	(France)	FW	Roberto di Benedetto
75	(Mexico)	FW	Tete Uri Vaibe
