= 2010–11 OK Liga =

- League: OK Liga
- Sport: Roller hockey
- Number of teams: 14
- League champions: Tecnol Reus Deportiu
- Runners-up: Coinasa Liceo
- Relegated to Primera División: buyvip.com Tenerife; GEiEG Girona; Lloret

OK Liga seasons
- ← 2009–10 2011–12 →

The 2010–11 OK Liga was the 42nd season of the top-tier league of rink hockey in Spain.

Reus Deportiu conquered its fifth title, the first one since 1973.

== Competition format ==
For this season, the league reduced the number of teams to 14. As it was approved for the previous season, the league continued without playoffs at the end of the round-robin tournament.

== League table ==
| Pos | Team | Pld | W | D | L | GF | GA | GD | Pts | Qualification or relegation |
|---|---|---|---|---|---|---|---|---|---|---|
| 1 | Tecnol Reus Deportiu | 26 | 20 | 2 | 4 | 109 | 60 | +49 | 62 | Qualification to European League |
| 2 | Coinasa Liceo | 26 | 19 | 2 | 5 | 99 | 66 | +33 | 59 | Qualification to European League |
| 3 | Barcelona Sorli Discau | 26 | 18 | 3 | 5 | 117 | 55 | +62 | 57 | Qualification to European League |
| 4 | Noia Freixenet | 26 | 13 | 5 | 8 | 92 | 79 | +13 | 44 | Qualification to European League |
| 5 | Vilanova | 26 | 12 | 6 | 8 | 102 | 86 | +16 | 42 | Qualification to CERS Cup |
| 6 | Igualada | 26 | 13 | 3 | 10 | 92 | 80 | +12 | 42 | Qualification to CERS Cup |
| 7 | Roncato Vic | 26 | 11 | 4 | 11 | 73 | 80 | −7 | 37 | Qualification to European League |
| 8 | Sather Blanes | 26 | 9 | 4 | 13 | 76 | 86 | −10 | 31 | Qualification to CERS Cup |
| 9 | Mortiz Vendrell | 26 | 9 | 3 | 14 | 62 | 85 | −23 | 30 | Qualification to CERS Cup |
| 10 | Enrile PAS Alcoy | 26 | 9 | 1 | 16 | 80 | 94 | −14 | 28 | Qualification to CERS Cup |
| 11 | Voltregà | 26 | 7 | 5 | 14 | 72 | 98 | −26 | 26 | |
| 12 | buyvip.com Tenerife | 26 | 7 | 3 | 16 | 74 | 108 | −34 | 24 | Relegation to Primera División |
| 13 | GEiEG | 26 | 4 | 8 | 14 | 55 | 98 | −43 | 20 | Relegation to Primera División |
| 14 | Lloret | 26 | 4 | 5 | 17 | 54 | 82 | −28 | 17 | Relegation to Primera División |

== Copa del Rey ==
2011 Copa del Rey
Tournament details
- Arena: Ciutat Esportiva de Blanes, Blanes
- Dates: 24–27 February 2011

Final positions
- Champions: Barcelona Lassa (18th title)
- Runners-up: Tecnol Reus Deportiu

The 2011 Copa del Rey was the 68th edition of the Spanish men's roller hockey cup. It was played in Blanes between the eight first qualified teams after the first half of the season.

Barcelona Sorli Discau won its 18th cup.

Quarterfinals
24 February
Barcelona Sorli Discau | 6
Vilanova | 1
24 February
Coinasa Liceo | 3
Sather Blanes | 2
25 February
Tecnol Reus Deportiu | 6
Noia Freixenet | 3
25 February
Roncato Vic | 3
Moritz Vendrell | 2

Semifinals
26 February
Barcelona Sorli Discau | 4
Liceo | 1
26 February
Tecnol Reus Deportiu | 6
Roncato Vic | 4

Final
27 February
Barcelona Sorli Discau | 4
Tecnol Reus Deportiu | 2
