= Blanes HCF =

Roller hockey club in Catalonia

Muralla Òptica Blanes
- Full name: Blanes Hoquei Club Fundació
- League: Primera División
- Founded: 1961
- Dissolved: 2015
- Home ground: Pavelló Municipal, Blanes, Catalonia (Capacity 1,400)

Personnel
- Chairman: Josep Ridaura
- Manager: Ramón Benito
Home

Blanes Hoquei Club Fundació was a professional roller hockey team based in Blanes, Catalonia. Its major successes to date are winning the 2001 Copa del Rey and reaching the final of the 2010 CERS Cup, lost to Liceo La Coruña.

== History ==
Blanes HCF held since 2004 the international roller hockey tournament named Golden Cup, that has won twice (2006 and 2007).

The club was dissolved in 2015.

== Season to season ==
Season	Tier	Division	Pos.	Copa del Rey	Europe	
2001–02	1	OK Liga	4th	Quarterfinalist	1 European League	R1
2002–03	1	OK Liga	6th	Quarterfinalist	1 European League	R1
2003–04	1	OK Liga	9th	Quarterfinalist	2 CERS Cup	QF
2004–05	1	OK Liga	9th			
2005–06	1	OK Liga	10th			
2006–07	1	OK Liga	9th	Quarterfinalist		
2007–08	1	OK Liga	6th	Quarterfinalist	2 CERS Cup	SF
2008–09	1	OK Liga	10th	Quarterfinalist	2 CERS Cup	QF
2009–10	1	OK Liga	9th		2 CERS Cup	RU
2010–11	1	OK Liga	8th	Quarterfinalist	1 European League	QF
2011–12	1	OK Liga	6th		2 CERS Cup	QF
2012–13	1	OK Liga	12th		2 CERS Cup	R16
2013–14	1	OK Liga	15th	Quarterfinalist		
2014–15	2	1ª División	10th			

== Trophies ==
- Copa del Rey: 1
  - 2001
- Golden Cup: 2
  - 2006, 2007
