= 2012–13 CERS Cup =

Tournament details
- Dates: 10 November 2012 – 12 May 2013
- Teams: 30 (from 9 associations)

Final positions
- Champions: (Spain) Vendrell (1st title)
- Runners-up: (Spain) Vic

Tournament statistics
- Matches played: 55
- Goals scored: 459 (8.35 per match)

The 2012–13 CERS Cup was the 33rd season of the CERS Cup, Europe's second club roller hockey competition organized by CERH. Thirty teams from nine national associations qualified for the competition as a result of their respective national league placing in the previous season. Following a preliminary phase and two knockout rounds, Vendrell won the tournament at its final four, in Vendrell, Spain on 11 and 12 May 2013.

== Preliminary phase ==
The preliminary phase legs took place on 10 and 24 November 2012.

Team 1	Agg.	Team 2	1st leg	2nd leg
Blanes (Spain)	6–2	(France) Coutras	6–1	0–1
Follonica (Italy)	3–4	(France) La Vendéenne	2–0	1–3 (g.g.)
Breganze (Italy)	29–2	(Austria) Wolfurt	16–0	13–2
Wimmis (Switzerland)	9–18	(Italy) Giovinazzo	7–7	2–11
Weil (Switzerland)	1–15	(Spain) Vic	0–10	1–5
Biasca (Switzerland)	4–9	(France) Ploufragan	1–3	3–6
Dornbirn (Austria)	1–13	(Italy) Forte dei Marmi	0–7	1–6
Barcelos (Portugal)	12–5	(Switzerland) Uttigen	8–0	4–5
Germania Herringen (Germany)	5–13	(Spain) SHUM Maçanet	4–3	1–10
Darmstadt (Germany)	2–10	(Spain) Vendrell	0–3	2–7
Diessbach (Switzerland)	12–9	(Germany) Iserlohn	6–3	6–6
Mérignac (France)	18–8	(Germany) Remscheid	11–2	7–6
Uri (Switzerland)	11–5	(England) Herne Bay United	7–0	4–5
Vilanova (Spain)	12–8	(France) Saint-Brieuc	9–4	3–4

== Knockout stage ==
The knockout stage consisted in double-legged series for the round of 16 and the quarterfinals, where the four winners would join the Final Four in Vendrell, Spain.

Round of 16
(Italy) Breganze	3	4	7
(Spain) Blanes	3	3	6
(France) Ploufragan	3	2	5
(Italy) Bassano	8	8	16
(Portugal) Barcelos	5	2	7
(Italy) Forte dei Marmi	3	7	10
(Switzerland) Diessbach	4	1	5
(Spain) Vendrell	6	5	11
(Switzerland) Uri	1	0	1
(Spain) Vilanova	8	12	20
(France) Mérignac	4	4	8
(Italy) Giovinazzo	2	7	9
(Spain) SHUM Maçanet	1	3	4
(Spain) Vic	5	1	6
(Portugal) Braga	4	4	8
(France) La Vendéenne	7	3	10

Quarter-finals
(Italy) Breganze	1	1	2
(Italy) Bassano	3	2	5
(Italy) Forte dei Marmi	5	2	7
(Spain) Vendrell	6	4	10
(Spain) Vilanova	5	4	9
(Italy) Giovinazzo	1	6	7
(Spain) Vic	2	4	6
(France) La Vendéenne	2	0	2

Semi-finals
(Italy) Bassano	4
(Spain) Vendrell	6
(Spain) Vilanova	1
(Spain) Vic	6

Final
(Spain) Vendrell (g.g.)	3
(Spain) Vic	2

== See also ==
- 2012–13 CERH European League
- 2012–13 CERH Women's European League
