= Patín Alcodiam Salesiano =

Spanish roller hockey team

Enrile PAS Alcoy
- Full name: Patí Alcodiam Salesiano
- League: OK Liga
- Founded: 1951
- Home ground: Pabellón Francisco Laporta, Alcoy, Spain (Capacity 1,000)

Personnel
- Chairman: (Spain) Andrés Hernández Orquín
- Manager: (Argentina) Diego Mir
| Home | Away |

Patín Alcodiam Salesiano (Valencian: Patí Alcodiam Salesià), more commonly known as Pas Alcoy or Enrile PAS Alcoy for sponsorship reasons, is a Spanish roller hockey team based in Alcoy, Valencian Community.

== History ==
Founded in 1951 and integrated as the roller hockey section of the Real Alcodiam Deportivo, in 1957 merged with the Colegio Salesiano for creating the Patín Alcodiam Salesiano.

The team made its debut in the top tier in 1974 and made the debut in European Competition by playing the CERS Cup in the 2009–10 season. Its best European performance was in 2012, when the club qualified for the semifinals of the 2011–12 CERS Cup.

== Season to season ==
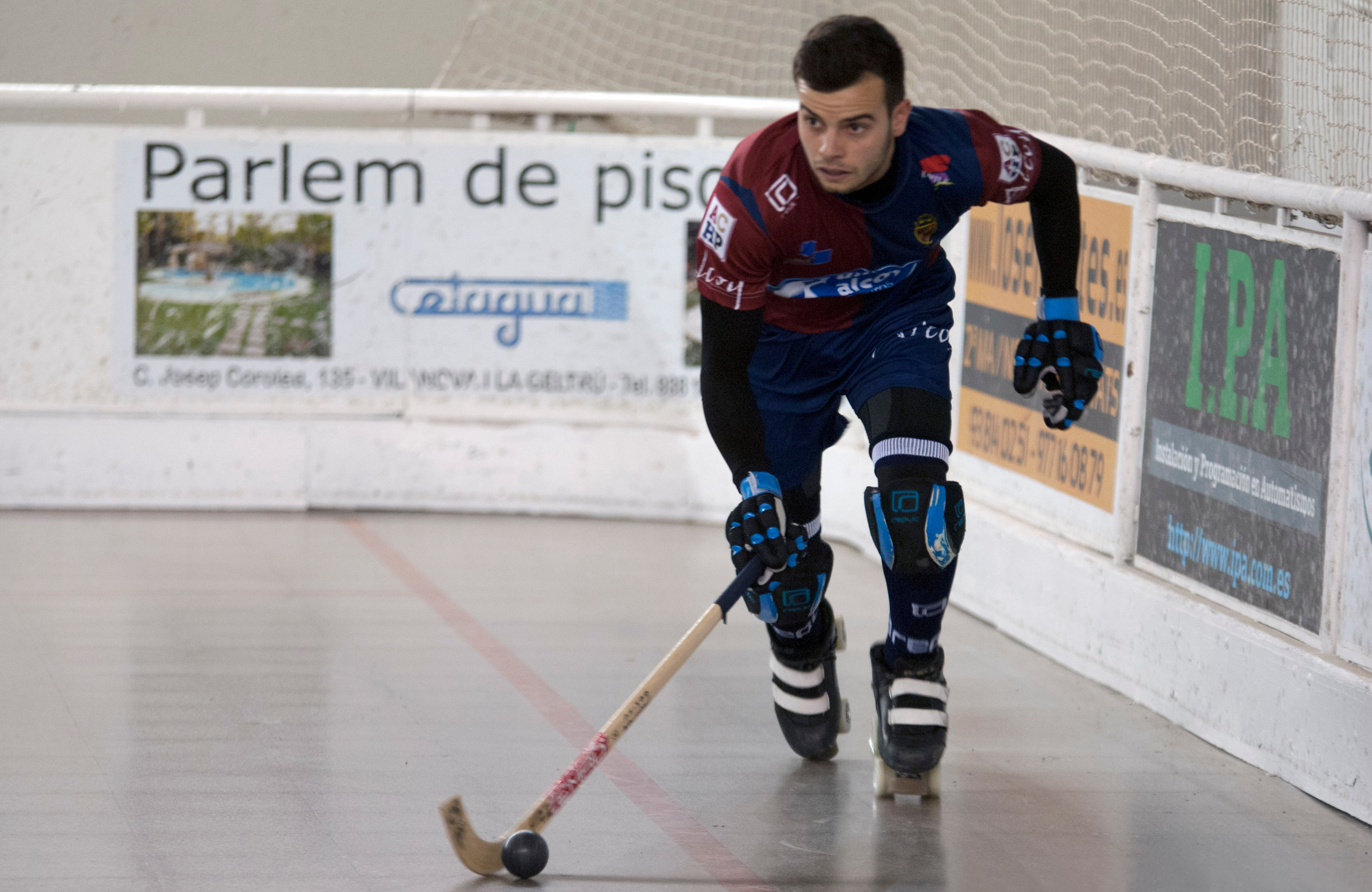
A player of the club in a match of the OK Liga.

| Season | Tier | Division | Pos. | Copa del Rey | Europe | |
|---|---|---|---|---|---|---|
| 2003–04 | 2 | 1ª División | 2nd | | | |
| 2004–05 | 1 | OK Liga | 11th | Quarterfinalist | | |
| 2005–06 | 1 | OK Liga | 11th | | | |
| 2006–07 | 1 | OK Liga | 14th | Quarterfinalist | | |
| 2007–08 | 2 | 1ª División | 2nd | | | |
| 2008–09 | 1 | OK Liga | 9th | | | |
| 2009–10 | 1 | OK Liga | 11th | | 2 CERS Cup | R16 |
| 2010–11 | 1 | OK Liga | 10th | | 2 CERS Cup | PR |
| 2011–12 | 1 | OK Liga | 13th | | 2 CERS Cup | SF |
| 2012–13 | 1 | OK Liga | 16th | | | |
| 2013–14 | 2 | 1ª División | 3rd | | | |
| 2014–15 | 1 | OK Liga | 9th | Quarterfinalist | | |
| 2015–16 | 1 | OK Liga | 12th | | 2 CERS Cup | R16 |
| 2016–17 | 1 | OK Liga | 10th | | | |
| 2017–18 | 1 | OK Liga | 13th | | | |
| 2018–19 | 1 | OK Liga | 16th | | | |

== Trophies ==
- Copa Princesa de Asturias: 1
  - 2014
