= 2005–06 CERS Cup =

Tournament details
- Dates: 3 December 2005 – 23 April 2006
- Teams: 18 (from 7 associations)

Final positions
- Champions: (Spain) Barcelona (1st title)
- Runners-up: (Spain) Vilanova

The 2005–06 CERS Cup was the 26th season of the CERS Cup, Europe's second club roller hockey competition organized by CERH. 18 teams from seven national associations qualified for the competition as a result of their respective national league placing in the previous season. Following a preliminary phase and four knockout rounds, Barcelona won its first title.

== Preliminary phase ==
Team 1	Agg.	Team 2	1st leg	2nd leg
Vilanova (Spain)	8–7	(Italy) Viareggio	5–3	3–4
Saint-Omer (France)	11–4	(Germany) Reimscheid	8–3	3–1

== Knockout stage ==
Round of 16
(France) Saint-Omer	W
(Italy) Novara (withdrew)	L
(Spain) Lloret	2	1	3
(Spain) Barcelona	6	2	8
(France) Quévert	0	1	1
(Spain) Igualada	7	8	15
(Switzerland) Montreux	5	1	6
(France) Ploufragan	6	5	11
(England) Herne Bay United	4	1	5
(Switzerland) Uttigen	6	6	12
(France) Nantes	2	1	3
(France) La Vendéenne	2	4	6
(Spain) Vilanova	6	1	7
(Switzerland) Genève	2	2	4
(Portugal) Portosantense	3	2	5
(Italy) Novara	5	4	9

Quarter-finals
(France) Saint-Omer	1	1	2
(Spain) Barcelona	4	10	14
(Spain) Igualada	7	8	15
(France) Ploufragan	2	0	2
(Switzerland) Uttigen	1	1	2
(France) La Vendéenne	1	4	5
(Spain) Vilanova	2	3	5
(Italy) Novara	0	3	3

Semi-finals
(Spain) Barcelona	4	3	7
(Spain) Igualada	0	1	1
(France) La Vendéenne	1	1	2
(Spain) Vilanova	3	4	7

Final
(Spain) Barcelona	3	2	5
(Spain) Vilanova	1	0	1

2006 CERS Cup winners
(Spain)
Barcelona
First title

== See also ==
- 2005–06 CERH European League
