= 2007–08 CERH European League =

Tournament details
- Teams: 16 (group stage); 4 (final)

Final positions
- Champions: Barcelona (18th title)
- Runners-up: Reus Deportiu

Tournament statistics
- Matches played: 51

The 2007–08 CERH European League was the 43rd edition of the CERH European League organized by CERH. Its Final Eight was held in May 2008 at the Palau Blaugrana, in Barcelona, Spain.

== Group stage ==
In each group, teams played against each other home-and-away in a home-and-away round-robin format.

The group winners advanced to the Final Four.

=== Group A ===
Pos	Team	Pld	W	D	L	GF	GA	GD	Pts	Qualification	BAR	FOL	VIL	WIM
1	(Spain) Barcelona	6	6	0	0	37	18	+19	18	Advance to Final Eight	—	5–3	8–3	7–1
2	(Italy) Follonica	6	4	0	2	38	18	+20	12		1–3	—	5–3	13–2
3	(Spain) Vilanova	6	2	0	4	15	27	−12	6		0–5	0–7	—	5–0
4	(Switzerland) Wimmis	6	0	0	6	10	47	−37	0		0–9	5–9	2–4	—

Source: Rinkhockey.net

=== Group B ===
Pos	Team	Pld	W	D	L	GF	GA	GD	Pts	Qualification	VIC	POR	PRA	HER
1	(Spain) Vic	6	5	0	1	56	6	+50	15	Advance to Final Eight	—	4–0	8–0	21–1
2	(Portugal) Porto	6	5	0	1	61	10	+51	15		4–1	—	10–1	20–1
3	(Italy) Prato	6	1	1	4	12	38	−26	4		1–8	3–6	—	4–4
4	(England) Herne Bay United	6	0	1	5	8	63	−55	1		0–14	0–21	2–3	—

Source: Rinkhockey.net

=== Group C ===
Pos	Team	Pld	W	D	L	GF	GA	GD	Pts	Qualification	REU	CAN	IGU	CRO
1	(Spain) Reus	6	4	1	1	21	8	+13	13	Advance to Final Eight	—	6–2	2–1	7–1
2	(Portugal) Candelária	6	4	0	2	21	17	+4	12		3–2	—	3–1	5–0
3	(Spain) Igualada	6	3	1	2	19	13	+6	10		8–3	1–1	—	4–2
4	(Germany) Cronenberg	6	0	0	6	5	28	−23	0		0–3	0–5	2–4	—

Source: Rinkhockey.net

=== Group D ===
Pos	Team	Pld	W	D	L	GF	GA	GD	Pts	Qualification	LIC	NOI	BAR	BAS
1	(Spain) Liceo	6	5	0	1	16	10	+6	15	Advance to Final Eight	—	3–1	1–0	1–0
2	(Spain) Noia	6	3	1	2	21	17	+4	10		1–2	—	3–2	6–5
3	(Portugal) Barcelos	6	2	0	4	12	19	−7	6		5–3	1–6	—	4–2
4	(Italy) Bassano	6	1	1	4	18	21	−3	4		3–6	4–4	4–0	—

Source: Rinkhockey.net

== Final four ==
The Final Four was played at Palau Blaugrana, in Barcelona, Spain.

Barcelona achieved its 18th title.

=== Bracket ===
Semifinals
10 May
(Spain) Liceo	1
(Spain) Reus	2
10 May
(Spain) Vic	3
(Spain) Barcelona	5

Final
11 May
(Spain) Reus	2
(Spain) Barcelona	5
