= 2006–07 CERH European League =

Tournament details
- Teams: 19

Final positions
- Champions: Barcelona (17th title)
- Runners-up: Bassano

Tournament statistics
- Matches played: 51

The 2006–07 CERH European League was the 42nd edition of the CERH European League organized by CERH. Its Final Four was held in May 2007 at the PalaBassano, in Bassano del Grappa, Italy.

== Preliminary round ==
Team 1	Agg.	Team 2	1st leg	2nd leg
Saint-Omer (France)	11–4	(England) Herne Bay United	5–1	6–3
Viareggio (Italy)	6–7	(Portugal) Juventude Viana	3–1	3–6
Coutras (France)	7–10	(Switzerland) Genève	2–4	5–6

== First round ==
The four eliminated teams with more points in the CERH ranking would be dropped to the 2006–07 CERS Cup.

Team 1	Agg.	Team 2	1st leg	2nd leg
Thunersten (Switzerland)	3–17	(Spain) Reus Deportiu	0–8	3–9
Porto (Portugal)	13–2	(France) La Vendéenne	6–1	7–1
Uttigen (Switzerland)	2–15	(Italy) Prato	1–5	1–10
Iserlohn (Germany)	2–13	(Spain) Barcelona	1–6	1–7
Saint-Omer (France)	2–12	(Italy) Bassano	1–2	1–10
Follonica (Italy)	12–8	(Portugal) Juventude Viana	9–3	3–5
Cronenberg (Germany)	6–14	(Spain) Vic	3–6	3–8
Genève (Switzerland)	7–16	(Portugal) Barcelos	3–7	4–9

== Group stage ==
In each group, teams played against each other home-and-away in a home-and-away round-robin format.

The two first qualified teams advanced to the Final Four.

=== Group A ===
Pos	Team	Pld	W	D	L	GF	GA	GD	Pts	Qualification	BAR	VIC	BAR	PRA
1	(Spain) Barcelona	6	5	0	1	28	11	+17	15	Advance to Final Eight	—	8–2	6–2	6–1
2	(Spain) Vic	6	3	0	3	13	17	−4	9	Advance to Final Eight	0–2	—	4–0	2–1
3	(Portugal) Barcelos	6	3	0	3	17	19	−2	9		4–3	2–3	—	4–2
4	(Italy) Prato	6	1	0	5	11	22	−11	3		2–3	4–2	1–5	—

Source: Rinkhockey.net

=== Group B ===
Pos	Team	Pld	W	D	L	GF	GA	GD	Pts	Qualification	BAS	POR	REU	FOL
1	(Italy) Bassano	6	3	2	1	16	14	+2	11	Advance to Final Eight	—	3–3	4–5	1–5
2	(Portugal) Porto	6	3	1	2	21	16	+5	10	Advance to Final Eight	1–2	—	4–1	5–1
3	(Spain) Reus Deportiu	6	2	2	2	13	17	−4	8		1–1	3–1	—	4–3
4	(Italy) Follonica	6	1	1	4	23	26	−3	4		4–5	6–7	4–4	—

Source: Rinkhockey.net

== Final four ==
The Final Four was played at PalaBassano, in Bassano del Grappa, Italy.

Barcelona achieved its 17th title.

=== Bracket ===
Semifinals
31 March
(Spain) Barcelona	3
(Portugal) Porto	2
31 March
(Italy) Bassano	3
(Spain) Vic	2

Final
1 April
(Spain) Barcelona	5
(Italy) Bassano	2
