= 2009–10 CERS Cup =

Tournament details
- Dates: 21 November 2009 – 16 May 2010
- Teams: 28 (from 8 associations)

Final positions
- Champions: (Spain) Liceo (3rd title)
- Runners-up: (Spain) Blanes

The 2009–10 CERS Cup was the 30th season of the CERS Cup, Europe's second club roller hockey competition organized by CERH. 28 teams from eight national associations qualified for the competition as a result of their respective national league placing in the previous season. Following a preliminary phase and two knockout rounds, Liceo won the tournament.

== Preliminary phase ==
Team 1	Agg.	Team 2	1st leg	2nd leg
Biaca (Switzerland)	5–7	(France) Mérignac	3–2	2–5
Giovinazzo (Italy)	14–1	(England) Herne Bay United	10–0	4–1
Amatori Lodi (Italy)	11–6	(France) Noisy le Grand	5–2	6–4
Wimmis (Switzerland)	12–23	(Spain) Igualada	5–8	7–15
Juventude Viana (Portugal)	8–11	(Spain) Liceo	4–5	4–6
Braga (Portugal)	15–7	(Germany) Germania Herringen	6–2	9–5
Genève (Switzerland)	12–8	(Germany) Cronenberg	7–4	5–4
Seregno (Italy)	5–13	(Spain) Vilanova	1–4	4–9
Bassano (Italy)	13–8	(Switzerland) Uttigen	9–2	4–6
Benfica (Portugal)	46–2	(England) Grimsby	23–1	23–1
Walsum (Germany)	6–14	(France) Coutras	2–9	4–5
PAS Alcoy (Spain)	13–5	(Austria) Dornbirn	8–2	5–3

== Knockout stage ==
The knockout stage consisted in double-legged series for the round of 16 and the quarterfinals, where the four winners would join the Final Four.

Round of 16
(France) Mérignac	5	4	9
(Italy) Giovinazzo	6	7	13
(Italy) Amatori Lodi	1	1	2
(Spain) Igualada	1	2	3
(Portugal) Oliveirense	13	5	18
(Switzerland) Genève	1	2	3
(Spain) Liceo	7	7	14
(Portugal) Braga	2	4	6
(Spain) Vilanova	8	3	11
(France) La Vendéenne	1	2	3
(Italy) Bassano	3	0	3
(Portugal) Benfica	4	5	9
(Switzerland) Thunersten	2	4	6
(Spain) Blanes	7	7	14
(France) Coutras	1	6	7
(Spain) PAS Alcoy	2	4	6

Quarter-finals
(Italy) Giovinazzo	4	0	4
(Spain) Igualada	1	8	9
(Portugal) Oliveirense	4	1	5
(Spain) Liceo	3	5	8
(Spain) Vilanova	2	3	5
(Portugal) Benfica	3	3	6
(Spain) Blanes	5	3	8
(France) Coutras	1	4	5

Semi-finals
(Spain) Igualada	1
(Spain) Liceo	2
(Portugal) Benfica	2
(Spain) Blanes	3

Final
(Spain) Liceo	7
(Spain) Blanes	2

=== Final Four matches ===
==== Semifinals ====
15 May
15:00

Igualada HC	1-2	HC Liceo La Coruña

Palácio dos Desportos de Torres Novas

==== Final ====
15 May
18:30

SL Benfica	2-3 a.e.t.	Blanes HCF
Ricardo Oliveira, João Rodrigues		Xavi Armengal, Dani Rodriguez, Alex Ridaura

Palácio dos Desportos de Torres Novas
Attendance: 800

2011 CERS Cup winners
(Spain)
Liceo
Third title

== See also ==
- 2010–11 CERH European League
- 2010–11 CERH Women's European Cup
