= CP Vilanova =

Spanish roller hockey team

Vilanova
- Full name: Club Patí Vilanova
- Nickname(s): --
- League: M: Nacional Catalana; W: Nacional Catalana
- Founded: 1951
- Home ground: Pavelló de les Casernes, Vilanova i la Geltrú, Catalonia (Capacity 890)

Personnel
- Chairman: Pau Viadel
- Manager: Jordi Costa
Home

Club Patí Vilanova is a roller hockey team from Vilanova i la Geltrú, Catalonia. It was founded in 1951. In the 2013–14 season, the men's team finished in last place with zero points, thus being relegated to the Primera División.

== Trophies ==
- Copa del Rey: 3
  - 1964, 1968, 1976
- CERS Cup: 1
  - 2006–07
- Catalan League: 2
  - 1963–64, 1965–66

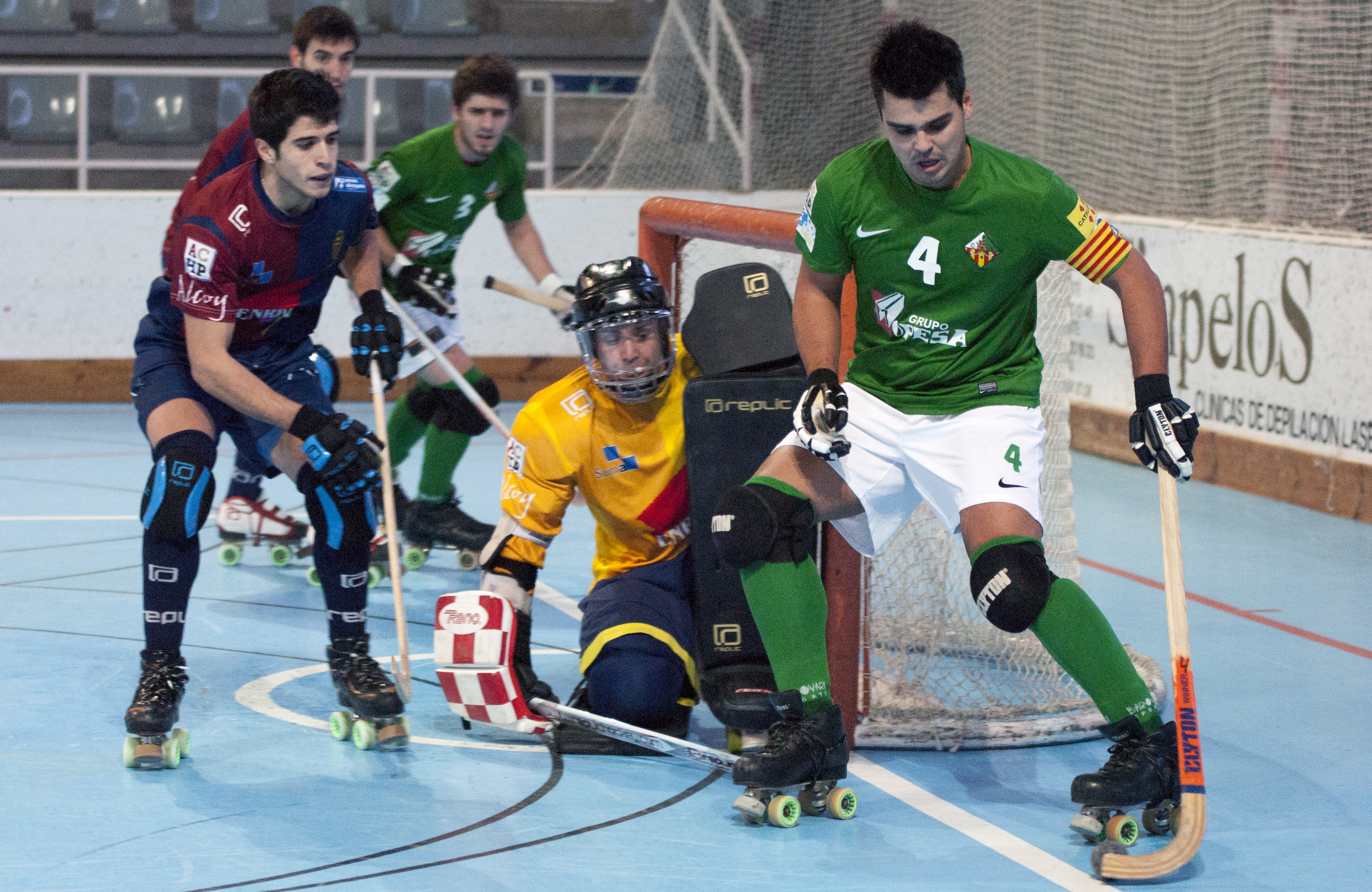
CP Vilanova

== Season to season ==
=== Men's team ===
Season	Tier	Division	Pos.	Copa del Rey	Europe	
2002–03	1	OK Liga	13th	Semifinalist		
2003–04	1	OK Liga	11th			
2004–05	1	OK Liga	6th	Quarterfinalist		
2005–06	1	OK Liga	5th	Quarterfinalist	2 CERS Cup	RU
2006–07	1	OK Liga	7th	Quarterfinalist	2 CERS Cup	C
2007–08	1	OK Liga	10th		1 European League	GS
2008–09	1	OK Liga	11th		1 European League	GS
2009–10	1	OK Liga	6th	Runner-up	2 CERS Cup	QF
2010–11	1	OK Liga	5th	Quarterfinalist	2 CERS Cup	RU
2011–12	1	OK Liga	8th	Semifinalist	2 CERS Cup	SF
2012–13	1	OK Liga	11th	Quarterfinals	2 CERS Cup	SF
2013–14	1	OK Liga	16th			
2014–15	2	1ª División	11th			
2015–16	2	1ª División	11th			
2016–17	2	1ª División	9th			
2017–18	2	1ª División	10th			
2018–19	2	OK Liga Plata	6th			

Season	Tier	Division	Pos.	Copa
2022–23	3	Nacional Catalana	9th	Semifinalist

=== Women's team ===
Season	Tier	Division	Pos.	Copa de la Reina
2008–09	(Note: Catalan teams refused to participate in the new OK Liga.)	Catalan league	2nd	Champion
2009–10	1	OK Liga	5th	Semifinalist
2010–11	1	OK Liga	5th	Fourth position
2011–12	1	OK Liga	8th	
2012–13	1	OK Liga	11th	
2013–14	1	OK Liga	4th	
2014–15	1	OK Liga	6th	
2015–16	1	OK Liga	5th	
2016–17	1	OK Liga	7th	
2017–18	1	OK Liga	5th	Champion
2018–19	1	OK Liga	9th	
