= Toni Pérez =

Spanish roller hockey player

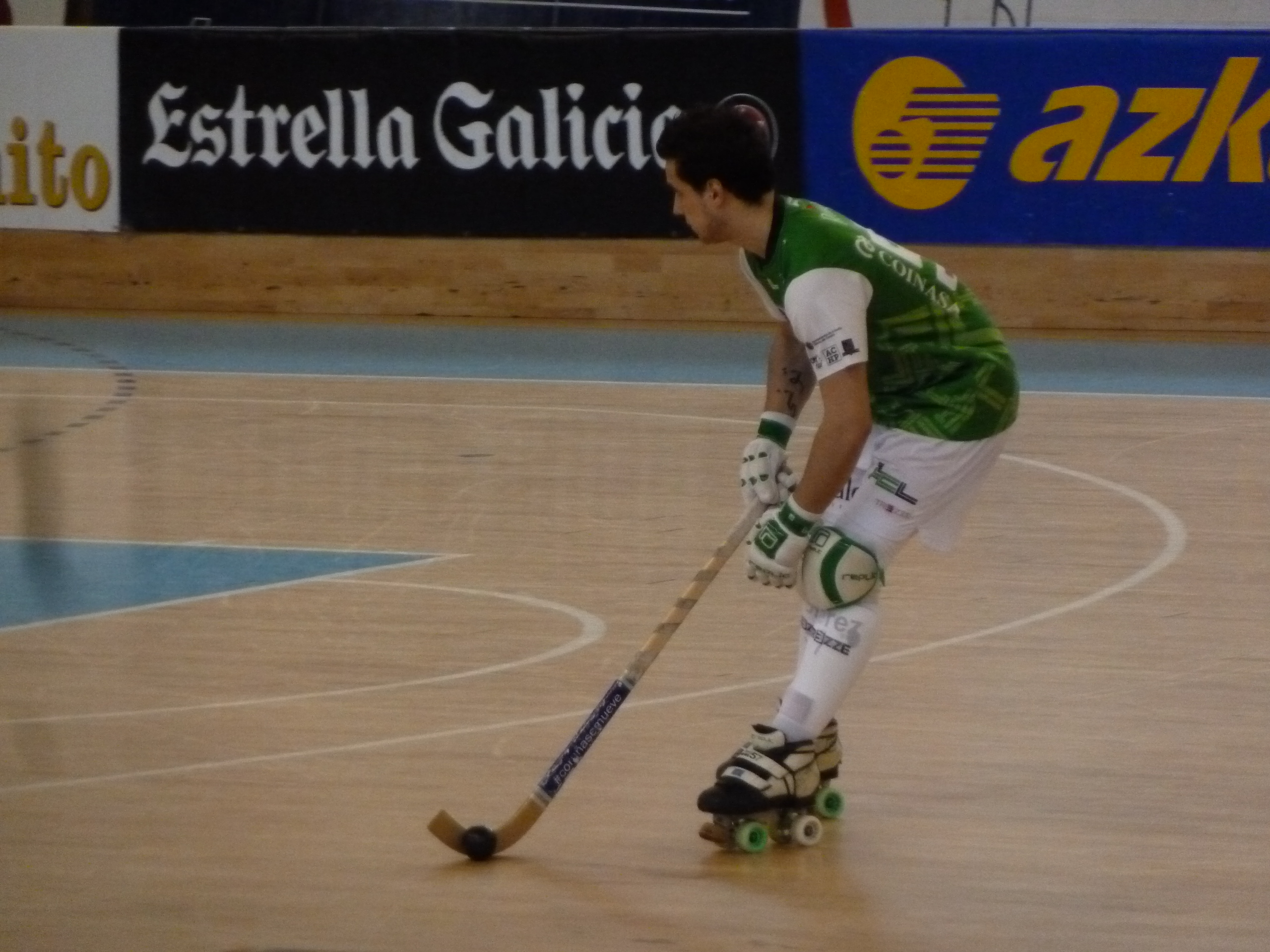

Personal information
- Full name: Antonio Pérez González
- Nationality: Spanish
- Born: 7 June 1990 (age 36) Oviedo, Spain
- Years active: 2006–

Sport
- Country: Spain
- Sport: Roller hockey
- Team: (Spain) Real Oviedo (2006–2008) (Spain) HC Liceo (2008–2009) (Spain) Cerceda (2009–2010) (Spain) PAS Alcoi (2010–2011) (Spain) HC Liceo (2011–2017) (Portugal) Sporting CP (2017–)

Antonio Pérez González (born 7 June 1990) is a professional roller hockey player who plays for Sporting CP.
