= Sant Hipòlit de Voltregà =

- Municipality
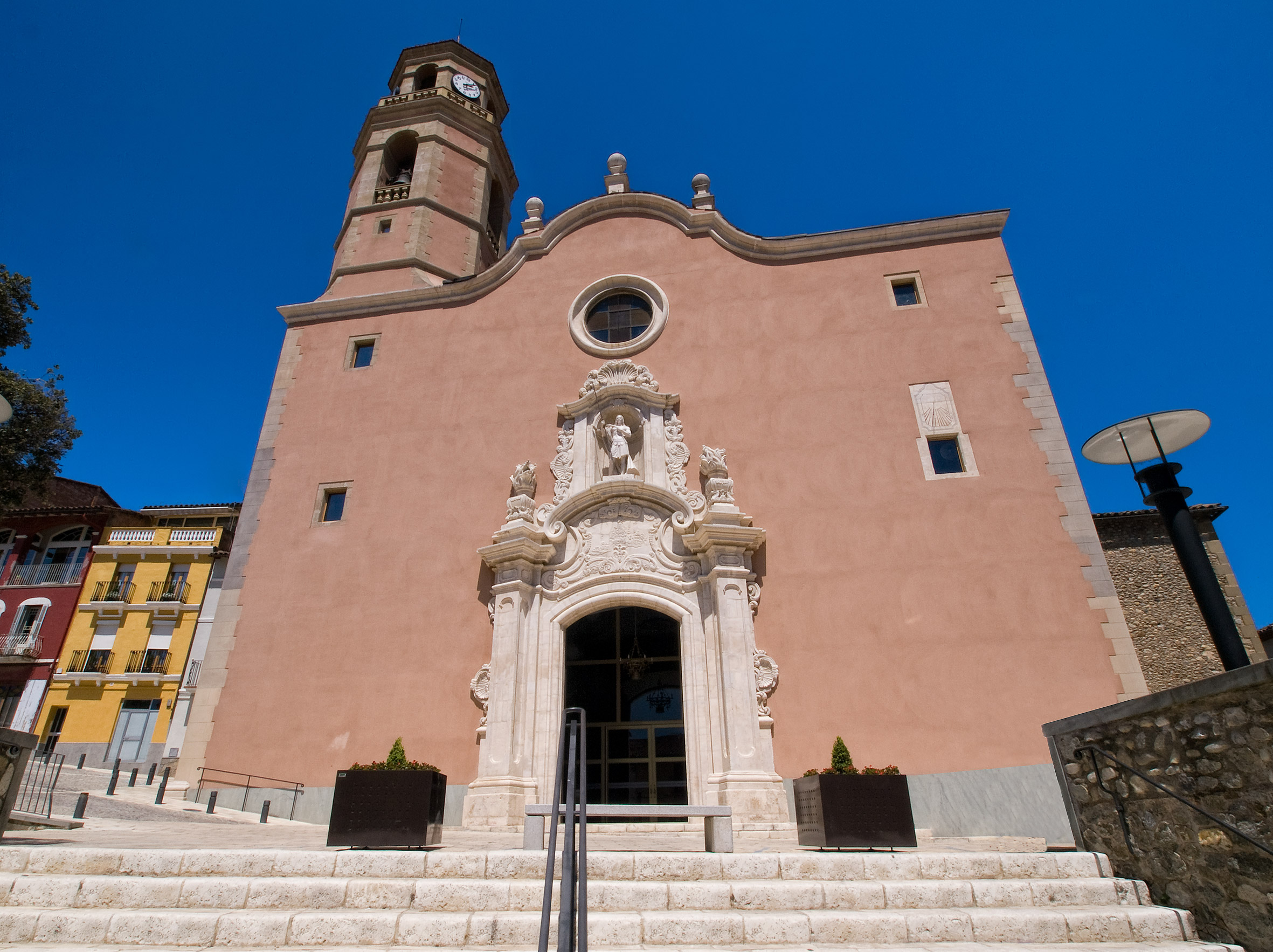
- Parish church

- Flag Coat of arms

- Location in Catalonia
- Coordinates: 42°1′2″N 2°14′20″E
- Country: Spain
- Community: Catalonia
- Province: Barcelona
- Comarca: Osona

Government
  - Mayor: Xavier Vilamala Bastarras (2015)

Area
  - Total: 0.9 km^{2} (0.35 sq mi)

Population (2025-01-01)
  - Total: 3,666
  - Density: 4,100/km^{2} (11,000/sq mi)
- Website: santhipolitdevoltrega.cat

Sant Hipòlit de Voltregà (Catalan pronunciation: [ˈsant iˈpɔlid də βultɾəˈɣa]; lit. 'St. Hippolytus of Voltregà') is a municipality in the comarca of Osona, Catalonia, Spain. It is surrounded by the municipality Les Masies de Voltregà.

== Sport ==
The city has a roller hockey team Club Patí Voltregà, one of the most important in Spain, and dispute the main League OK Liga.

== History ==
Sant Hipòlit de Voltregà was one of the so-called burnt villages attacked by the Bourbons during the War of the Spanish Succession. And the sanctuary of La Gleva, the last refuge of the Catalan troops of the town before the soldiers of Philip V massacred them.

In early 1714, the Bourbon marshal José Carrillo de Albornoz, Count of Montemar, entered the plain of Vic with a thousand horses and one thousand five hundred infantry. The Catalan army of Antoni Desvalls, Marquis of Poal, pursued the incursion and forced the Bourbon detachment to flee northwards along the Ter River.

In the last days of January, the column of the Count of Montemar reached La Gleva, where he imprisoned some civilians and executed a hundred of the subjects who had fortified themselves in the sanctuary of the Mare de Déu. The Philippist detachment then headed for the town of Sant Hipòlit de Voltregà. With the aim of spreading terror among those Catalan populations that had risen up against Philip V's new taxes, the troops sacked and set fire to the city. These events, which took place at the beginning of 1714, are known as the Fets de la Gleva.
