= Pazo dos Deportes de Riazor =

Sports arena in A Coruña, Galicia, Spain

Riazor
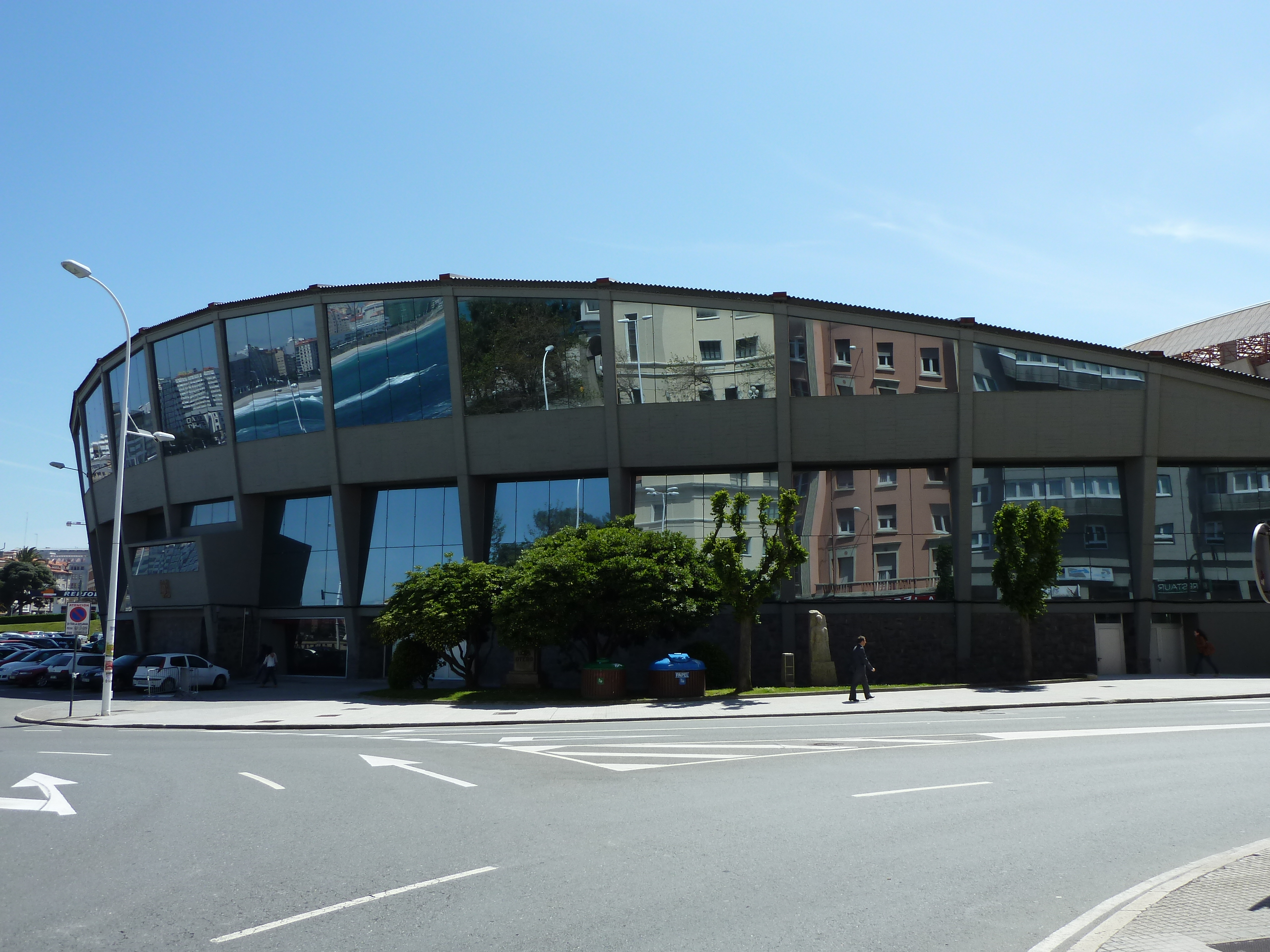
- Interactive map of Riazor
- Full name: Pazo dos Deportes de Riazor
- Location: A Coruña, Galicia, Spain
- Coordinates: 43°22′9″N 8°24′57″W
- Owner: A Coruña City Hall
- Capacity: 4,425 (expandable to 5,000)
- Surface: Parquet Floor

Construction
- Groundbreaking: November 1968
- Opened: 1 August 1970
- Renovated: 2011
- Architect: Santiago Rey Pedreira

Tenants
- HC Liceo; Básquet Coruña (1996–2024)

Pazo dos Deportes de Riazor is a multi-purpose sports arena in A Coruña, Galicia, Spain. Located at Riazor's sports complex, the venue has 4,425 seats and a maximum capacity of 5,000 people. The arena is owned by the A Coruña City Hall and faces Estadio Riazor.

== History ==
Construction started in November 1968 and finished with its opening on August 1, 1970, hosting a roller hockey match between Spain and a World Team composed of several players.

Riazor hosted the Roller Hockey World Cups of 1972 and 1988. In 2018, Riazor was the venue for one of that season's Women's Flat Track Derby Association Playoffs, featuring roller derby teams from the United States, Argentina, England, France, Finland and Sweden. The tournament was held from August 31 through September 2, and won by Arch Rival Roller Derby from St. Louis, United States.

The arena was renovated in 2011.

Currently, it is the home court of roller hockey team HC Liceo and basketball team Básquet Coruña.
