= 2013–14 CERS Cup =

Tournament details
- Dates: 9 November 2013 – 6 April 2014
- Teams: 31 (from 8 associations)

Final positions
- Champions: (Spain) CE Noia (2nd title)
- Runners-up: (Italy) Hockey Breganze

Tournament statistics
- Matches played: 55
- Goals scored: 501 (9.11 per match)

The 2013–14 CERS Cup was the 34th season of the CERS Cup, Europe's second club roller hockey competition organized by CERH. Thirty-one teams from eight national associations qualified for the competition as a result of their respective national league placing in the previous season. Following a preliminary phase and two knockout rounds, CE Noia won the tournament at its final four, in HC Forte dei Marmi, Italy on 5–6 April 2014.

== Teams ==
Thirty-one teams from eight national associations qualified for the competition.

Italy	Spain	France	Switzerland	Germany	Portugal	Austria	England
Hockey Breganze; HC Forte dei Marmi; Bassano Hockey 54; Hockey Prato 54; Follonica Hockey	CP Vic; CP Voltregà; CE Noia; Igualada HC; CE Lleida	RAC Saint-Brieuc; La Vendéenne; AS Mérignac; US Coutras; RHC Lyon	Genève RHC; Montreux HC; RC Biasca; RHC Wimmis; RHC Uri	RSC Cronenberg; IGR Remscheid; RSC Darmstadt; RESG Walsum	Candelária SC; HC Turquel; OC Barcelos; HC Braga	RHC Wolfurt; RHC Dornbirn	Herne Bay United

== Preliminary phase ==
The preliminary phase legs took place on 9 and 23 November 2013.

Team 1	Agg.	Team 2	1st leg	2nd leg
US Coutras (France)	8–10	(Italy) Hockey Prato 54	5–2	3–8
CP Voltregà (Spain)	7–8	(Italy) Bassano Hockey 54	3–3	4–5
RHC Wimmis (Switzerland)	3–19	(Spain) Igualada HC	2–7	1–12
Genève RHC (Switzerland)	8–7 (g.g.)	(France) La Vendéenne	6–3	2–4
Follonica Hockey (Italy)	26–0	(Austria) RHC Wolfurt	16–0	10–0
HC Forte dei Marmi (Italy)	23–8	(Switzerland) Montreux HC	11–2	12–6
IGR Remscheid (Germany)	Forfait	(England) Herne Bay United		
RESG Walsum (Germany)	3–8	(Spain) CE Lleida	1–3	2–5
Hockey Breganze (Italy)	10–7	(Portugal) Candelária SC	6–2	4–5
CE Noia (Spain)	8–4	(France) RHC Lyon	4–3	4–1
HC Turquel (Portugal)	21–3	(Germany) RSC Darmstadt	15–1	6–2
RHC Uri (Switzerland)	2–17	(Portugal) OC Barcelos	1–7	1–10
RHC Dornbirn (Austria)	4–15	(Portugal) HC Braga	3–11	1–4
AS Mérignac (France)	14–7	(Switzerland) RC Biasca	8–2	6–5
RAC Saint-Brieuc (France)	8–10	(Germany) RSC Cronenberg	5–6	3–4

== Knockout phase ==
First round
1	(Italy) Follonica Hockey	4	0	4
16	(Portugal) HC Turquel	5	1	6
8	(Spain) Lleida	4	6	10
9	(Italy) HC Forte dei Marmi	5	6	11
5	(Italy) Bassano Hockey 54	5	12	17
12	(France) AS Mérignac	3	5	8
4	(Spain) CE Noia	4	1	5
13	(Portugal) HC Braga	3	0	3
6	(Germany) IGR Remscheid	4	3	7
11	(Switzerland) Genève RHC	5	13	18
3	(Portugal) OC Barcelos	3	4	7
14	(Italy) Hockey Breganze	5	6	11
7	(Germany) RSC Cronenberg	3	1	4
10	(Spain) CP Vic	3	5	8
2	(Italy) Hockey Prato 54	4	2	6
15	(Spain) Igualada HC	3	10	13

Quarter-finals
(Portugal) HC Turquel	5	3	8
(Italy) HC Forte dei Marmi	3	14	17
(Italy) Bassano Hockey 54	3	2	5
(Spain) CE Noia	2	8	10
(Switzerland) Genève RHC	2	5	7
(Italy) Hockey Breganze	8	5	13
(Spain) CP Vic	2	2	4
(Spain) Igualada HC	2	4	6

Semi-finals
(Italy) HC Forte dei Marmi	1	P	2
(Spain) CE Noia	1	S	3
(Italy) Hockey Breganze	4	P	7
(Spain) Igualada HC	4	S	6

Final
(Spain) CE Noia	4
(Italy) Hockey Breganze	3

== Final-Four ==
=== Semi-finals ===
5 April
17:30 CET

Breganze (Italy)	4-4	(Spain) Igualada
1-1 Sérgio Silva 5.49'; 2-1 Mattia Cocco 8.48'; 3-1 Mattia Cocco 17.18'; 4-2 Gaston de Oro 10.43' (2nd Hf)		0-1 Oriol Vives 4.01'; 3-2 Ton Baliu 19.55'; 4-3 Jassel Oller 23.27' (2nd Hf); 4-4 Oriol Vives 24.33' (2nd Hf)
Penalties
Gaston de Oro (penalty missed); Mattia Cocco (penalty scored); Stefano dal Santo (penalty missed); Claudio Filho "Cacau" (penalty scored); Sérgio Silva (penalty scored)	3-2	(penalty missed) Sergi Pla; (penalty scored) Oriol Vives; (penalty scored) Jassel Oller; (penalty missed) Ton Baliu; (penalty missed) Met Molas

Forte dei Marmi
Referee: (Portugal) Rui Torres, (Portugal) Paulo Rainha
5 April
20:00 (CET)

Forte dei Marmi (Italy)	1-1	(Spain) Noia
1-0 Verona 24.33'		1-1 Marc Julià 17.55' (2nd Hf)
Penalties
Pablo Cancela (penalty missed); Alberto Orlandi (penalty missed); Pedro Gil (penalty missed); Alessandro Verona (penalty missed); Enric Torner (penalty missed)	1-2	(penalty scored) Eloi Mitjans; (penalty missed) Joan Feixas; (penalty missed) Francesc Gil; (penalty scored) Pau Bargallo; (penalty missed) Jordi Del Amor

Forte dei Marmi
Referee: (Switzerland) Roland Eggimann, (France) Xavier Bleuzen

=== Final ===
6 April
19:30 (CET)

Breganze (Italy)	3-4	(Spain) CE Noia
1-0 Cláudio Filho "Cacau" 5'; 2-1 Cláudio Filho "Cacau" 4' 2nd Hf; 3-1 Cláudio Filho "Cacau" 5' 2nd Hf		1-1 Joan Feixas 11'; 3-2 Aleix Esteller 10' 2nd Hf; 3-3 Marc Julia 14' 2nd Hf; 3-4 Aleix Esteller 24'2s 2nd Hf

Forte dei Marmi
Referee: (Portugal) Rui Torres, (Portugal) Paulo Rainha

(Spain) CE NOIA (2nd)
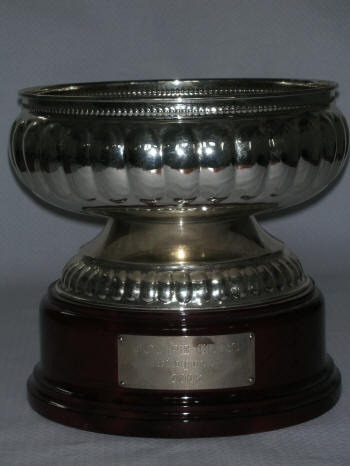

== See also ==
- 2013–14 CERH European League
- 2013–14 CERH Women's European League
