= 2008–09 CERS Cup =

Tournament details
- Dates: 18 October 2008 – 19 April 2009
- Teams: 27 (from 8 associations)

Final positions
- Champions: (Spain) Mataró (3rd title)
- Runners-up: (Spain) Lloret

The 2008–09 CERS Cup was the 29th season of the CERS Cup, Europe's second club roller hockey competition organized by CERH. 27 teams from eight national associations qualified for the competition as a result of their respective national league placing in the previous season. Following a preliminary phase and two knockout rounds, Mataró won the tournament.

== Preliminary phase ==
Team 1	Agg.	Team 2	1st leg	2nd leg
Walsum (Germany)	17–3	(England) Middlesbrough	12–1	5–2
Weil (Switzerland)	6–4	(Germany) Cronenberg	4–0	2–4
Lloret (Spain)	3–1	(Italy) Amatori Lodi	2–0	1–1
Germania Herringen (Germany)	5–6	(Portugal) Gulpilhares	2–2	3–4
Viareggio (Italy)	11–5	(France) Mérignac	10–4	1–1
Braga (Portugal)	18–7	(France) Coutras	10–4	8–3
Breganze (Italy)	8–4	(France) Wimmis	3–0	5–4
Oliveirense (Portugal)	12–8	(Italy) Trissino	6–4	6–4
Mataró (Spain)	8–6	(Portugal) Candelária	3–2	5–4
Biasca (Switzerland)	15–4	(England) Bury St. Edmunds	8–1	7–3
Dornbirn (Austria)	2–18	(Spain) Blanes	1–6	1–12

== Knockout stage ==
The knockout stage consisted in double-legged series for the round of 16 and the quarterfinals, where the four winners would join the Final Four, that was played in Lloret de Mar.

Round of 16
(Germany) Walsum	3	1	4
(Switzerland) Weil	3	3	6
(Spain) Lloret	4	3	7
(Portugal) Gulpilhares	1	3	4
(Italy) Novara	1	4	5
(France) La Vendéenne	4	5	9
(Italy) Viareggio	6	3	9
(Portugal) Braga	3	2	5
(Italy) Breganze	2	2	4
(France) Saint Omer	1	5	6
(Switzerland) Thunerstern	3	1	4
(Portugal) Oliveirense	3	8	11
(Switzerland) Genève	2	2	4
(Spain) Mataró	3	4	7
(Switzerland) Biasca	7	7	14
(Spain) Blanes	2	4	6

Quarter-finals
(Switzerland) Weil	3	0	3
(Spain) Lloret	4	2	6
(France) La Vendéenne	3	2	5
(Italy) Viareggio	8	6	14
(France) Saint Omer	2	1	3
(Portugal) Oliveirense	3	4	7
(Spain) Mataró	2	1	3
(Spain) Blanes	1	1	2

Semi-finals
(Spain) Lloret	3
(Italy) Viareggio	0
(Portugal) Oliveirense	2
(Spain) Mataró	3

Final
(Spain) Lloret	1
(Spain) Mataró	2

2009 CERS Cup winners
(Spain)
Mataró
First title

== See also ==
- 2008–09 CERH European League
- 2009 CERH Women's European Cup
