= 2010–11 CERH European League =

2010-11 CERH European League
- Poster for the Final 8 of the competition

Tournament details
- Dates: 20 November 2010 - 21 May 2011
- Teams: 16 (group stage); 8 (final)

Final positions
- Champions: (Spain) HC Coinasa Liceo (5th title)
- Runners-up: (Spain) Tecnol Reus

The 2010–11 CERH European League was the 46th edition of the CERH European League organized by CERH. The final eight was held in May 2011 in Andorra la Vella, Andorra.

== Group stage ==
In each group, teams played against each other home-and-away in a home-and-away round-robin format.

The group winners and runners-up advanced to the Final Eight.

=== Group A ===
Pos	Team	Pld	W	D	L	GF	GA	GD	Pts	Qualification	REU	LIC	BAS	GEN
1	(Spain) Reus	6	5	0	1	40	18	+22	15	Advance to Final Eight	—	6–3	5–3	7–1
2	(Spain) Liceo	6	4	0	2	37	18	+19	12	Advance to Final Eight	5–3	—	5–1	12–0
3	(Italy) Bassano	6	3	0	3	25	22	+3	9		4–5	6–4	—	7–0
4	(Switzerland) Genève	6	0	0	6	8	52	−44	0		2–14	2–8	3–4	—

Source: OKCat.cat

=== Group B ===
Pos	Team	Pld	W	D	L	GF	GA	GD	Pts	Qualification	BAR	BLA	FOL	SOM
1	(Spain) Barcelona	6	6	0	0	35	7	+28	18	Advance to final eight	—	5–1	9–0	8–2
2	(Spain) Blanes	6	2	2	2	13	15	−2	8	Advance to final eight	2–4	—	5–2	3–2
3	(Italy) Follonica	6	1	2	3	12	25	−13	5		2–4	2–2	—	4–4
4	(France) Saint Omer	6	0	2	4	9	22	−13	2		0–5	0–0	1–2	—

Source: OKCat.cat

=== Group C ===
Pos	Team	Pld	W	D	L	GF	GA	GD	Pts	Qualification	CAN	NOI	VIC	VIA
1	(Portugal) Candelária	6	3	1	2	24	18	+6	10	Advance to final eight	—	5–3	6–4	5–1
2	(Spain) Noia	6	3	0	3	19	21	−2	9	Advance to final eight	4–3	—	4–1	5–4
3	(Spain) Vic	6	3	0	3	18	20	−2	9		4–3	3–1	—	4–2
4	(Italy) Viareggio	6	2	1	3	17	19	−2	7		2–2	5–2	3–1	—

Source: OKCat.cat

=== Group D ===
Pos	Team	Pld	W	D	L	GF	GA	GD	Pts	Qualification	POR	VAL	COU	CRO
1	(Portugal) Porto	6	4	1	1	40	25	+15	13	Advance to final eight	—	5–1	11–4	11–1
2	(Italy) Valdagno	6	5	0	1	36	20	+16	15	Advance to final eight	10–3	—	7–3	7–3
3	(France) Coutras	6	1	2	3	26	34	−8	5		7–7	5–7	—	5–0
4	(Germany) Cronenberg	6	0	1	5	9	32	−23	1		2–3	1–4	2–2	—

Source: OKCat.cat

== Final eight ==
The final eight was played at the Poliesportiu d'Andorra. It is the biggest multi-arena in Andorra la Vella with a capacity of 1,750.

=== Bracket ===
Bracket for the final eight.

Quarter-finals
May 19, Andorra la Vella
(Portugal) Porto Império Bonança	4
(Spain) Barcelona Sorli Discau	3
May 18, Andorra la Vella
(Spain) Coinasa Liceo	7
(Spain) Noia Freixenet	4
May 19, Andorra la Vella
(Italy) Isello Valdagno	2
(Spain) Tecnol Reus	4
May 18, Andorra la Vella
(Spain) Sather Blanes	0
(Portugal) Candelária Bom Petisco	2

Semi-finals
May 20, Andorra la Vella
(Portugal) Porto Império Bonança	4
(Spain) Coinasa Liceo	5
May 20, Andorra la Vella
(Spain) Tecnol Reus	3
(Portugal) Candelária Bom Petisco	2

Final
May 21, Andorra la Vella
(Spain) Coinasa Liceo	7
(Spain) Tecnol Reus	4

=== Results ===
==== Quarterfinals ====
May 18, 2011; 18:45 CET
May 18, 2011; 18:45 CET	Sather Blanes	0-2	Candelária Bom Petisco	Poliesportiu d'Andorra, Andorra la Vella
May 18, 2011; 18:45 CET		Report	Sérgio Silva; Martin Montiver	Poliesportiu d'Andorra, Andorra la Vella
	Umpires: Gianni Fermi (ITA) & Alessandro da Prato (ITA)

May 18, 2011; 20:30 CET
May 18, 2011; 20:30 CET	Coinasa Liceo	7-4	Noia Freixenet	Poliesportiu d'Andorra, Andorra la Vella
May 18, 2011; 20:30 CET	Pedro Afonso(2); Pablo Álvarez(3); Ricardo Barreiro(1); Jordi Bargalló(1)	Report	Francesc Bargalló(1); Jordi del Amor(1); Eloi Mitjans(1); Aleix Esteller(1)	Poliesportiu d'Andorra, Andorra la Vella
	Umpires: Joaquim Carpelho (POR) & Luís Peixoto (POR)

May 19, 2011; 18:45 CET
May 19, 2011; 18:45 CET	Isello Valdagno	2-4	Tecnol Reus	Poliesportiu d'Andorra, Andorra la Vella
May 19, 2011; 18:45 CET	Valerio Antezza; Dario Rigo	Report	Xavier Caldú (2); Raúl Marín; José Luis Páez	Poliesportiu d'Andorra, Andorra la Vella
	Umpires: Luís Peixoto (POR) & Joaquim Carpelho (POR)

May 19, 2011; 20:30 CET
May 19, 2011; 20:30 CET	Porto Império Bonança	4-3	Barcelona Sorli Discau	Poliesportiu d'Andorra, Andorra la Vella
May 19, 2011; 20:30 CET	Pedro Gil (2); Reinaldo Ventura; Emanuel García	Report	Marc Torra; Carlos López; Reinaldo García	Poliesportiu d'Andorra, Andorra la Vella
	Umpires: Alessandro da Prato (ITA) & Gianni Fermi (ITA)

==== Semifinals ====
May 20, 2011; 18:45 CET
May 20, 2011; 18:45 CET	Tecnol Reus	3-2	Candelária Bom Petisco	Poliesportiu d'Andorra, Andorra la Vella
May 20, 2011; 18:45 CET	Marc Gual; Jordi Molet; José Luis Páez	Report	Tiago Resende (2)	Poliesportiu d'Andorra, Andorra la Vella
	Umpires: Gianni Fermi (ITA) & Alessandro da Prato (ITA)

May 20, 2011; 20:30 CET
May 20, 2011; 20:30 CET	Porto Império Bonança	4-5	Coinasa Liceo	Poliesportiu d'Andorra, Andorra la Vella
May 20, 2011; 20:30 CET	Pedro Gil; Gonçalo Suíssas; Reinaldo Ventura (2)	Report	Josep Lamas (2); Sergio Miras; Jordi Bargalló; Ricardo Barreiros	Poliesportiu d'Andorra, Andorra la Vella
	Umpires: Alessandro da Prato (ITA) & Gianni Fermi (ITA)

==== Final ====
May 21, 2011; 20:00 CET
May 21, 2011; 20:00 CET	Tecnol Reus	4-7	Coinasa Liceo	Poliesportiu d'Andorra, Andorra la Vella
May 21, 2011; 20:00 CET	Marc Gual (2); Raúl Marín (1), Albert Casanovas (1)	Report	Pablo Alvarez (4); Jordi Bargalló (1), Ricardo Barreiros (2)	Poliesportiu d'Andorra, Andorra la Vella
	Umpires: Luís Peixoto (POR) & Joaquim Carpelho (POR)

2011 CERH European League winners
(Spain)
HC Coinasa Liceo
Fifth title
