= 2011–12 CERH European League =

Tournament details
- Dates: 19 December 2011 - 27 May 2012
- Teams: 16 (group stage); 8 (final eight) (from 7 associations)

Final positions
- Champions: (Spain) HC Coinasa Liceo (6th title)
- Runners-up: (Spain) Barcelona Sorli Discau

The 2011–12 CERH European League was the 47th season of the CERH European League, Europe's premier roller hockey tournament, and the 15th season since it was renamed from Champions League to European League. It took place from 19 December 2011 to 27 May 2012. Sixteen teams from seven national associations qualified for the competition as a result of their domestic league placing in the previous season. Following a group stage the eight best teams contested a final eight tournament, which took place at the PalaCastellotti arena in Lodi. The tournament was won by HC Coinasa Liceo, who beat Barcelona Sorli Discau, obtaining their second consecutive win.

== Teams distribution ==
Since the title holders, HC Coinasa Liceo, qualified to the group stage through their domestic league, the spot reserved to the defending champion spot was vacated. The CERH decided to discontinue club ranking as a criterion to select the participating teams. In 2011–2012, for the first year, the qualifying clubs were selected using association ranking, with a criterion similar to that of the UEFA Champions League.

Teams allocation by country:

Rank	Association	Coeff.	Teams
1st	Spain		5
2nd	Portugal		4
3rd	Italy		3
4th	France		1
5th	Germany		1
6th	Switzerland		1
7th	England		1

== Teams ==
The following teams participated to the group stage:

Country	Team	Qualified as
(Spain)	HC Coinasa Liceo	Title holders
(Spain)	Tecnol Reus Deportiu	1st Position in 2010-11 OK Liga
(Spain)	Barcelona Sorli Discau	3rd Position in 2010-11 OK Liga
(Spain)	CE Noia Freixenet	4th Position in 2010-11 OK Liga
(Spain)	Roncato Patí Vic	7th Position in 2010-11 OK Liga
(Portugal)	FC Porto Império Bonança	1st Position in 2010-11 1ª Divisão
(Portugal)	Benfica	2nd Position in 2010-11 1ª Divisão
(Portugal)	UD Oliveirense	3rd Position in 2010-11 1ª Divisão
(Portugal)	Candelária Sport Clube	4th Position in 2010-11 1ª Divisão
(Italy)	CGC Viareggio	1st Position in 2010-11 Serie A1
(Italy)	Isello Hockey Valdagno	2nd Position in 2010-11 Serie A1
(Italy)	Amatori Lodi	3rd Position in 2010-11 Serie A1
(France)	US Coutras	1st Position in 2010-11 Nationale 1
(Germany)	RSC Cronenberg	1st Position in 2010-11 Bundesliga
(Germany)	ERG Iserlohn	2nd Position in 2010-11 Bundesliga
(Switzerland)	Genève RHC	1st Position in 2010-11 LNA

== Group stage ==
The 16 teams were placed in 4 groups, with the two best placed teams from each group advancing to the Final Eight.

=== Group A ===
Team	Pld	W	D	L	GF	GA	GD	Pts
(Spain) Barcelona Sorli Discau	6	3	2	1	23	14	+9	11
(Portugal) Candelária Sport Clube	6	3	1	2	16	14	+2	10
(Italy) CGC Viareggio	6	3	1	2	23	26	−3	10
(Spain) CE Noia Freixenet	6	1	0	5	16	24	−8	3

=== Group B ===
Team	Pld	W	D	L	GF	GA	GD	Pts
(Spain) Tecnol Reus Deportiu	6	4	2	0	25	13	+12	14
(Portugal) UD Oliveirense	6	3	3	0	23	7	+16	12
(Germany) RSC Cronenberg	6	2	0	4	14	27	−13	6
(France) US Coutras	6	0	1	5	14	29	−15	1

=== Group C ===
Team	Pld	W	D	L	GF	GA	GD	Pts
(Spain) HC Coinasa Liceo	6	4	0	2	29	19	+10	12
(Italy) Isello Hockey Valdagno	6	4	0	2	32	24	+8	12
(Portugal) FC Porto Império Bonança	6	4	0	2	42	30	+12	12
(Switzerland) Genève RHC	6	0	0	6	19	49	−30	0

=== Group D ===
Team	Pld	W	D	L	GF	GA	GD	Pts
(Portugal) Benfica	6	4	1	1	38	17	+21	13
(Italy) Amatori Lodi	6	4	0	2	24	20	+4	12
(Spain) Roncato Patí Vic	6	3	1	2	21	19	+2	10
(Germany) ERG Iserlohn	6	0	0	6	9	36	−27	0

== Final Eight ==
The 2012 Final Eight was contested in Lodi, in the PalaCastellotti arena, from 24 to 27 May 2012. HC Coinasa Liceo won the tournament, beating Barcelona Sorli Discau in the final.

Quarter-finals
24 May - PalaCastellotti
(Portugal) UD Oliveirense	2
(Spain) Barcelona Sorli Discau	6
24 May - PalaCastellotti
(Spain) Tecnol Reus Deportiu	3
(Italy) Amatori Lodi	1
25 May - PalaCastellotti
(Portugal) Candelária Sport Clube	2
(Spain) HC Coinasa Liceo	4
25 May - PalaCastellotti
(Portugal) Benfica	5
(Italy) Isello Hockey Valdagno	11

Semi-finals
26 May - PalaCastellotti
(Spain) Barcelona Sorli Discau	5
(Spain) Tecnol Reus Deportiu	2
26 May - PalaCastellotti
(Italy) Isello Hockey Valdagno	3
(Spain) HC Coinasa Liceo	5

Final
27 May - PalaCastellotti
(Spain) Barcelona Sorli Discau	2
(Spain) HC Coinasa Liceo	4

2012 CERH European League winners
(Spain)
HC Coinasa Liceo
Sixth title
