= 2004–05 CERS Cup =

Tournament details
- Dates: 4 December 2004 – 30 April 2005
- Teams: 22 (from 5 associations)

Final positions
- Champions: (Italy) Follonica (1st title)
- Runners-up: (Italy) Bassano

The 2004–05 CERS Cup was the 25th season of the CERS Cup, Europe's second club roller hockey competition organized by CERH. 22 teams from five national associations qualified for the competition as a result of their respective national league placing in the previous season. Following a preliminary phase and four knockout rounds, Follonica won its first title.

== Preliminary phase ==
Team 1	Agg.	Team 2	1st leg	2nd leg
Cronenberg (Germany)	1–13	(Spain) Noia	1–8	0–5
Benfica (Portugal)	6–3	(Spain) Vic	5–2	1–1
Breganze (Italy)	9–3	(Switzerland) Diessbach	9–0	0–3
Paço d'Arcos (Portugal)	1–11	(Spain) Lleida Lista Blava	1–1	0–10
Wimmis (Switzerland)	8–9	(Switzerland) Genève	2–4	6–5
Nantes (France)	1–15	(Italy) Novara	0–6	1–9

== Knockout stage ==
Round of 16
(France) Saint-Brieuc	2	0	2
(Italy) Novara	7	11	18
(Germany) Iserlohn	1	4	5
(Portugal) Portosantense	7	3	10
(Switzerland) Genève	2	3	5
(Italy) Bassano	8	10	18
(Spain) Lleida Llista Blava	3	3	6
(Italy) Breganze	3	5	8
(Germany) Walsum	0	2	2
(Portugal) Benfica	9	9	18
(Switzerland) Thunerstern	5	4	9
(Italy) Follonica	11	8	19
(Italy) Prato	7	10	17
(France) Mérignac	2	2	4
(Spain) Liceo	2	0	2
(Spain) Noia	3	5	8

Quarter-finals
(Italy) Novara	4	5	9
(Portugal) Portosantense	7	4	11
(Italy) Bassano	6	6	12
(Italy) Breganze	1	1	2
(Portugal) Benfica	6	2	8
(Italy) Follonica (g.g.)	3	6	9
(Italy) Prato	3	1	4
(Spain) Noia (g.g.)	2	3	5

Semi-finals
(Portugal) Portosantense	2	2	4
(Italy) Bassano	2	8	10
(Italy) Follonica	11	5	16
(Spain) Noia	4	6	10

Final
(Italy) Bassano	0	4	4
(Italy) Follonica	4	4	8

2005 CERS Cup winners
(Italy)
Follonica
First title

== See also ==
- 2004–05 CERH European League
