= 2003–04 CERS Cup =

Tournament details
- Dates: 6 December 2003 – 1 May 2004
- Teams: 19 (from 5 associations)

Final positions
- Champions: (Spain) Reus Deportiu (2nd title)
- Runners-up: (Italy) Bassano

The 2003–04 CERS Cup was the 24th season of the CERS Cup, Europe's second club roller hockey competition organized by CERH. 19 teams from five national associations qualified for the competition as a result of their respective national league placing in the previous season. Following a preliminary phase and four knockout rounds, Reus Deportiu won its second consecutive title.

== Preliminary phase ==
Team 1	Agg.	Team 2	1st leg	2nd leg
RAC Saint-Brieuc (France)	1–21	(Spain) Igualada	1–7	0–13
Iserlohn (Germany)	1–10	(Portugal) Portosantense	1–4	0–6
Blanes (Spain)	6–4	(Switzerland) Diessbach	3–1	3–3

== Knockout stage ==
Round of 16
(Portugal) Portosantense	3	1	4
(Spain) Voltregà	2	8	10
(France) Quévert	6	3	9
(Switzerland) Thunerstern	1	1	2
(Germany) Walsum	1	1	2
(Portugal) Gulpilhares	4	5	9
(Italy) Gorizia	2	1	3
(Italy) Bassano	7	4	11
(Italy) Follonica	1	3	4
(Spain) Igualada	6	7	13
(France) Gazinet-Cestas	2	2	4
(Switzerland) Genève	9	12	21
(Spain) Blanes	5	1	6
(France) Saint-Omer	1	1	2
(Switzerland) Uttigen	2	2	4
(Spain) Reus Deportiu	4	9	13

Quarter-finals
(Spain) Voltregà	2	5	7
(France) Quévert	2	3	5
(Portugal) Gulpilhares	2	0	2
(Italy) Bassano	7	1	8
(Spain) Igualada	7	12	19
(Switzerland) Genève	3	4	7
(Spain) Blanes	1	2	3
(Spain) Reus Deportiu	2	5	7

Semi-finals
(Spain) Voltregà	3	1	4
(Italy) Bassano	4	3	7
(Spain) Igualada	2	1	3
(Spain) Reus Deportiu	1	3	4

Final
(Italy) Bassano	0	1	1
(Spain) Reus Deportiu	4	0	4

2004 CERS Cup winners
(Spain)
Reus Deportiu
Second title

== See also ==
- 2003–04 CERH European League
