= 2009–10 CERH European League =

Tournament details
- Dates: 27–30 May (Final Six)
- Teams: 16 (group stage); 6 (final)

Final positions
- Champions: (Catalonia) FC Barcelona (19th title)
- Runners-up: (Catalonia) CP Vic

Tournament statistics
- Matches played: 7
- Goals scored: 113 (16.14 per match)

The 2009–10 CERH European League was the 45th edition of the CERH European League organized by CERH. Its Final Six was held in May 2010 at PalaLido in Valdagno, Italy.

== Group stage ==
In each group, teams played against each other home-and-away in a home-and-away round-robin format.

The group winners advanced directly to the Final Six while the runners-up advanced to a qualifying play-off.

=== Group A ===
Pos	Team	Pld	W	D	L	GF	GA	GD	Pts	Qualification	VIC	FOL	MAT	SOM
1	(Spain) Vic	6	5	1	0	22	9	+13	16	Advance to Final Six	—	2–1	5–2	3–1
2	(Italy) Follonica	6	3	0	3	23	17	+6	9	Advance to qualifying play-off	2–5	—	9–1	6–2
3	(Spain) Mataró	6	2	0	4	15	27	−12	6		1–5	4–1	—	5–3
4	(France) Saint Omer	6	1	1	4	15	22	−7	4		2–2	3–4	4–2	—

Source: OKCat.cat

=== Group B ===
Pos	Team	Pld	W	D	L	GF	GA	GD	Pts	Qualification	NOI	REU	CAN	WEI
1	(Spain) Noia	6	4	1	1	23	18	+5	13	Advance to knockout phase	—	3–2	5–1	4–3
2	(Spain) Reus Deportiu	6	4	1	1	22	13	+9	13	Advance to qualifying play-off	4–4	—	5–1	7–0
3	(Portugal) Candelária	6	3	0	3	23	21	+2	9		7–2	2–3	—	6–4
4	(Switzerland) Weil-Am-Reihn	6	0	0	6	11	31	−20	0		1–5	1–3	2–6	—

Source: OKCat.cat

=== Group C ===
Pos	Team	Pld	W	D	L	GF	GA	GD	Pts	Qualification	BAR	LLO	BAS	QUE
1	(Spain) Barcelona	6	6	0	0	36	6	+30	18	Advance to knockout phase	—	4–0	9–3	10–1
2	(Spain) Lloret	6	3	1	2	20	25	−5	10	Advance to qualifying play-off	2–6	—	6–5	3–2
3	(Italy) Bassano	6	2	1	3	27	33	−6	7		0–4	6–6	—	6–3
4	(France) Quévert	6	0	0	6	13	32	−19	0		0–3	2–3	5–7	—

Source: OKCat.cat

=== Group D ===
Pos	Team	Pld	W	D	L	GF	GA	GD	Pts	Qualification	VAL	POR	VIA	ISE
1	(Italy) Valdagno	6	4	1	1	34	18	+16	13	Advance to knockout phase	—	5–3	3–5	7–3
2	(Portugal) Porto	6	3	1	2	38	21	+17	10	Advance to qualifying play-off	3–5	—	10–6	15–3
3	(Italy) Viareggio	6	2	2	2	22	24	−2	8		4–4	1–1	—	3–2
4	(Germany) Iserlohn	6	1	0	5	13	44	−31	3		0–10	1–6	4–3	—

Source: OKCat.cat

== Qualifying play-off ==
The two winners of this play-off would join the Final Six competition with the four group winners.

Team 1	Agg.	Team 2	1st leg	2nd leg
Reus Deportiu (Spain)	9–6	(Spain) Lloret	5–1	4–5
Follonica (Italy)	6–11	(Portugal) Porto	4–6	2–5

== Final Six ==
The 2010 European League Final Six was held in May 2010 in Valdagno, Italy.

=== Group stage ===
==== Group E ====
Team	Pld	W	D	L	GF	GA	GD	Pts
(Spain) Barcelona	2	1	1	0	15	7	+8	4
(Portugal) Porto	2	1	1	0	8	6	+2	4
(Italy) Valdagno	2	0	0	2	5	15	–10	0

27 May 2010
19:00 (+0 GMT

FC Porto	4 – 4	FC Barcelona
Jorge Silva, Reinaldo Ventura, Pedro Gil, Filipe Santos		David Paez, Josep Maria Ordeig, Reinaldo Garcia, Carlitos Lopez

PalaLido
Referee: Massimiliano Carmazzi, Gianni Fermi (Italy)

28 May 2010
19:00 (+0GMT)

FC Porto	4 – 2	AS Valdagno
Reinaldo Ventura, Pedro Gil, Emanuel Garcia (2), Emanuel Garcia		Massimo Tataranni, Carlos Nicolia

PalaLido
Referee: Josep Ribo and Jose Gómez (Spain)

29 May 2010
19:00 (+0GMT)

AS Valdagno	3 – 11	FC Barcelona

PalaLido

==== Group F ====
Team	Pld	W	D	L	GF	GA	GD	Pts
(Spain) Vic	2	1	1	0	9	8	+1	4
(Spain) Reus Deportiu	2	1	0	1	9	7	+2	3
(Spain) Noia	2	0	1	1	8	11	–3	1

27 May 2010
17:00(+0GMT)

Reus Deportiu	6 – 3	CE Noia
Bertolucci Alessandro, Bertolucci Mirko, Molet Jordi, Caldu Xavier(3)		Bargallò Francesc, Cabestany Guillerm(2)

PalaLido

28 May 2010

CP Vic	4 – 3	Reus Deportiu
Marc Torra(2), Titi Roca(2)		Jordi Molet(2), Mirko Bertolucci

PalaLido

29 May 2010
17:00(+0GMT)

CE Noia	5 – 5	CP Vic

PalaLido

=== Final ===
30 May 2010
16:00 (+0GMT)

FC Barcelona	4-1	CP Vic

PalaLido
Attendance: 1500

FC Barcelona
19th Title
