= 2014–15 CERS Cup =

Tournament details
- Dates: 18 October 2014 – 26 April 2014
- Teams: 32 (from 8 associations)

Final positions
- Champions: (Portugal) Sporting CP (2nd title)
- Runners-up: (Spain) Reus Deportiu

Tournament statistics
- Matches played: 59
- Goals scored: 433 (7.34 per match)

The 2014–15 CERS Cup was the 35th season of the CERS Cup, Europe's second club roller hockey competition organized by CERH. Thirty-two teams from eight national associations qualified for the competition as a result of their respective national league placing in the previous season.

== Teams ==
Thirty-two teams from eight national associations qualified for the competition.

Spain	Portugal	Germany	Switzerland	France	Italy	Austria	England
Cerceda; Reus Deportiu; CP Calafell; CE Noia; Igualada HC	Oliveirense; Candelária SC; OC Barcelos; Sporting; HC Turquel	IGR Remscheid; RSC Darmstadt; Iserlohn; RSC Cronenberg; Bison-Calenberg	RSC Uttigen; Diessbach; RHC Basel; RC Biasca; RHC Uri	RHC Lyon; Saint Omer; AS Merignac; CS Noisy le Grand	Follonica Hockey; Trissino; Sarzana; CGC Viareggio	RHC Wolfurt; RHC Dornbirn; RHC Villach	Herne Bay United

== Preliminary phase ==
The preliminary phase legs took place on 18 October and 1 November 2014.

Team 1	Agg.	Team 2	1st leg	2nd leg
IGR Remscheid (Germany)	14–6	(England) Herne Bay United	11–4	3–2
Candelária SC (Portugal)	13–3	(Germany) Bison-Calenberg	11–3	2–0
Sarzana (Italy)	6–10	(France) Saint Omer	3–4	3–6
RSC Darmstadt (Germany)	2–6	(Switzerland) RHC Basel	1–4	1–2
Reus Deportiu (Spain)	30–3	(Austria) RHC Villach	17–1	13–2
RHC Lyon (France)	9–6	(Switzerland) RC Biasca	5–1	4–5
RHC Dornbirn (Austria)	1–8	(Italy) CGC Viareggio	0–4	1–4
Oliveirense (Portugal)	11–5	(Spain) Cerceda	6–3	5–2
RHC Wolfurt (Austria)	4–11	(Switzerland) Diessbach	1–2	3–9
RSC Uttigen (Switzerland)	7–9	(Germany) RSC Cronenberg	5–2	2–7
CP Calafell (Spain)	3–6	(Portugal) Sporting CP	2–3	1–3
Igualada HC (Spain)	9–4	(Portugal) HC Turquel	6–0	3–4
Follonica Hockey (Italy)	11–4	(Switzerland) RHC Uri	7–3	4–2
OC Barcelos (Portugal)	5–4	(Spain) CE Noia	2–1	3–3
Iserlohn (Germany)	7–12	(France) AS Merignac	5–8	2–4
Trissino (Italy)	9–8	(France) CS Noisy le Grand	8–4	1–4

== Knockout phase ==
Round of 16
(Spain) Igualada HC	3	4	7
(Italy) Trissino	2	3	5
(Italy) Follonica Hockey	3	4	8
(France) AS Merignac	3	4	7
(Switzerland) RHC Basel	3	3	6
(Portugal) Sporting	4	5	9
(Portugal) Oliveirense	7	5	12
(Italy) CGC Viareggio	3	2	5
(France) RHC Lyon	1	4	5
(France) Saint Omer	5	3	8
(Germany) RSC Cronenberg	2	2	4
(Portugal) OC Barcelos	5	5	10
(Germany) IGR Remscheid	0	2	2
(Spain) Reus Deportiu	13	11	24
(Portugal) Candelária SC	3	3	7
(Switzerland) Diessbach	2	4	8

Quarterfinals
(Spain) Igualada HC	4	0	4
(Italy) Follonica Hockey	2	1	3
(Portugal) Sporting	2	4	6
(Portugal) Oliveirense	3	1	4
(France) Saint Omer	1	5	6
(Portugal) OC Barcelos	4	4	8
(Spain) Reus Deportiu	5	4	9
(Switzerland) Diessbach	2	2	4

Semifinals
(Spain) Igualada HC	2
(Portugal) Sporting	3
(Portugal) OC Barcelos	1
(Spain) Reus Deportiu	6

Final
(Portugal) Sporting	2 (2g)
(Spain) Reus Deportiu	2 (1p)

== Final-Four ==
=== Semi-finals ===
25 Abril
18:00 CET

OC Barcelos (Portugal)	1-6	(Spain) Reus Deportiu
1-4 Luís Querido 13.13' (2nd Hf)	report	0-1 Matias Platero 7.35'; 0-2 Xavier "Xavi" Costa 23'; 0-3 Xavier "Xavi" Rubio 6.25' (2ªP); 0-4 Marc Coy 7.24' (2ªP, LD Azul); 1-5 Marc Coy LD 20ªF 14.12' (2ªP, LD); 1-6 Joan Salvat 24.53' (2ªP, GP)

Pabellon Municipal Les Comes
Referee: Massimiliano Carmazzi (Italy) e Ulderico Barbarisi (Italy)
25 Abril
20:30 (CET)

Igualada HC (Spain)	2-3 (a.e.t.)	(Portugal) Sporting
1-1 Antonio "Ton" Baliu 20.42'; 2-2 Jaume Molas 22.33' (2nd Hf, LD)	report	1-0 João Pinto "Mustang" 19.35'; 1-2 Tiago Losna 21.46'; 2-3 Ricardo Figueira 50+4' (golden goal)

Pabellon Municipal Les Comes
Referee: Dereck Bell (England) e T. Ulrich (Germany)

=== Final ===
26 Abril
20:30 (CET)

Sporting (Portugal)	2-2	(Spain) Reus Deportiu
0-1 Tiago Losna 3'; 2-2 João Pinto "Mustang" 21' (2nd Hf)	report	1-1 Marc Coy 12' (2nd Hf); 2-1 Marc Coy 16' (2nd Hf)
Penalties
Ricardo Figueira (penalty missed); Daniel Oliveira "Poka" (penalty scored); Nicolas "Nico" Fernandez (penalty scored); João Pinto "Mustang" (penalty missed)	2-1	(penalty missed) Xavier Costa; (penalty missed) Xavi Rubio; (penalty missed) Matias Platero; (penalty scored) Joan Salvat; (penalty missed) Marc Coy

Pabellon Municipal Les Comes
Referee: Arnau Esoli (FRA) and Xavier Bleuzen (FRA)

(Portugal) SPORTING CP (2nd)
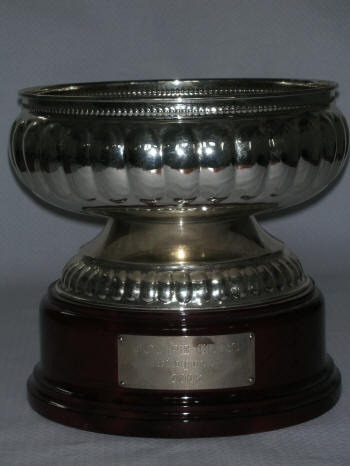

== See also ==
- 2014–15 CERH European League
- 2014–15 CERH Women's European League
