= 2003–04 CERH European League =

Tournament details
- Teams: 17

Final positions
- Champions: Barcelona (15th title)
- Runners-up: Porto

The 2003–04 CERH European League was the 39th edition of the CERH European League organized by CERH. Its Final Four was held on 15 and 16 May 2004 at PalaBarsacchi, in Viareggio, Italy.

== Preliminary round ==
Team 1	Agg.	Team 2	1st leg	2nd leg
Wimmis (Switzerland)	6–14	(France) Mérignac	4–9	2–5

== First round ==
The four eliminated teams with best ranking joined the CERS Cup.

Team 1	Agg.	Team 2	1st leg	2nd leg
Bassano (Italy)	2–4	(Italy) Prato	1–2	1–2
Benfica (Portugal)	7–4	(France) La Vendéenne	6–3	1–1
Vic (Spain)	10–2	(France) Saint-Omer	7–1	3–1
Porto (Portugal)	13–6	(Italy) Roller Salerno	9–0	4–6
Barcelona (Spain)	16–1	(Switzerland) Genève	10–1	6–1
Liceo (Spain)	7–7 (p)	(Spain) Noia	3–1	4–6
Mérignac (France)	4–20	(Portugal) Barcelos	0–10	4–10
Uttigen (Switzerland)	6–6 (p)	(Germany) Cronenberg	2–3	4–3

== Group stage ==
In each group, teams played against each other home-and-away in a home-and-away round-robin format.

The two first qualified teams advanced to the Final Four.

=== Group A ===
Pos	Team	Pld	W	D	L	GF	GA	GD	Pts	Qualification	BAR	BCS	LIC	CRO
1	(Spain) Barcelona	6	5	1	0	29	11	+18	11	Advance to Final Four	—	5–2	2–2	9–3
2	(Portugal) Barcelos	6	4	0	2	36	15	+21	8	Advance to Final Four	2–4	—	5–2	14–0
3	(Spain) Liceo	6	2	1	3	27	18	+9	5		1–6	2–10	—	4–8
4	(Germany) Cronenberg	6	0	0	6	11	59	−48	0		2–7	1–3	0–7	—

Source: Rinkhockey.net

=== Group B ===
Pos	Team	Pld	W	D	L	GF	GA	GD	Pts	Qualification	POR	PRA	VIC	BEN
1	(Portugal) Porto	6	5	0	1	27	13	+14	10	Advance to Final Four	—	4–2	8–1	3–2
2	(Italy) Prato	6	4	0	2	33	24	+9	8	Advance to Final Four	4–5	—	5–2	7–6
3	(Spain) Vic	6	3	0	3	21	28	−7	6		5–3	4–8	—	4–1
4	(Portugal) Benfica	6	0	0	6	15	30	−15	0		0–4	3–7	3–5	—

Source: Rinkhockey.net

== Final four ==
The Final Four was played at PalaBarsacchi, in Viareggio, Italy.

Barcelona achieved its 15th title.

=== Bracket ===
Semifinals
15 May
(Italy) Hockey Prato	0
(Spain) Barcelona	3
15 May
(Portugal) Barcelos	4
(Portugal) Porto	7

Final
16 May
(Spain) Barcelona	3
(Portugal) Porto	0
