= 2002–03 CERS Cup =

Tournament details
- Dates: 30 November 2002– 26 April 2003
- Teams: 25 (from 7 associations)

Final positions
- Champions: (Spain) Reus Deportiu (1st title)
- Runners-up: (Spain) Lleida

The 2002–03 CERS Cup was the 23rd season of the CERS Cup, Europe's second club roller hockey competition organized by CERH. 25 teams from seven national associations qualified for the competition as a result of their respective national league placing in the previous season. Following a preliminary phase and four knockout rounds, Reus Deportiu won its first title.

== Preliminary phase ==
Team 1	Agg.	Team 2	1st leg	2nd leg
Walsum (Germany)	4–24	(Spain) Lleida	4–7	0–17
Mérignac (France)	w.o.	(England) Grimsby	–	–
Modena (Italy)	29–5	(England) Herne Bay United	15–1	14–4
Reimscheid (Germany)	3–7	(France) La Vendéenne	1–2	2–5
Düsseldorf-Nord (Germany)	3–29	(Portugal) Gulpilhares	1–17	2–12
Follonica (Italy)	9–4	(Switzerland) Wimmis	5–3	4–3
Forte dei Marmi (Italy)	14–7	(Switzerland) Langenthal	11–4	3–3
Diessbach (Switzerland)	5–9	(France) Gazinet-Cestas	3–3	2–6
Reus Deportiu (Spain)	9–7	(Portugal) Infante Sagres	4–2	5–5

== Knockout stage ==
Round of 16
(France) Gazinet-Cestas	3	1	4
(Italy) Follonica	8	5	13
(Spain) Lleida	11	5	16
(France) La Vendéenne	2	2	4
(Switzerland) Thunerstern	1	1	2
(Italy) Bassano	6	15	21
(France) Quévert	2	2	4
(Switzerland) Genève	2	0	2
(Portugal) Oliveirense	6	1	7
(Italy) Modena	3	3	6
(Spain) Noia	6	6	12
(Italy) Forte dei Marmi	0	2	2
(Spain) Voltregà	6	7	13
(France) Mérignac	1	1	2
(Portugal) Gulpilhares	4	1	5
(Spain) Reus Deportiu	6	4	10

Quarter-finals
(Italy) Follonica	3	2	5
(Spain) Lleida	4	7	11
(Italy) Hockey Bassano	8	6	14
(France) Quévert	1	1	2
(Portugal) Oliveirense	4	0	4
(Spain) Noia	2	3	5
(Spain) Voltregà	2	2	4
(Spain) Reus Deportiu	1	4	5

Semi-finals
(Spain) Lleida	5	5	10
(Italy) Bassano	2	7	9
(Spain) Noia	2	2	4
(Spain) Reus Deportiu	2	3	5

Final
(Spain) Lleida	3	0	3
(Spain) Reus Deportiu	2	5	7

2003 CERS Cup winners
(Spain)
Reus Deportiu
First title

== See also ==
- 2002–03 CERH European League
