= 2005–06 CERH European League =

Tournament details
- Teams: 20

Final positions
- Champions: Follonica (1st title)
- Runners-up: Porto

The 2005–06 CERH European League was the 41st edition of the CERH European League organized by CERH. Its Final Four was held in May 2007 in Torres Novas, Portugal.

== Preliminary round ==
Team 1	Agg.	Team 2	1st leg	2nd leg
Cronenberg (Germany)	5–11	(Italy) Follonica	2–7	3–4
Iserlohn (Germany)	9–3	(England) Bury St Edmunds	5–2	4–1
Wimmis (Switzerland)	2–4	(Spain) Noia	0–3	2–1
Mérignac (France)	6–12	(Spain) Vic	2–5	4–7

== First round ==
The four eliminated teams with more points in the CERH ranking would be dropped to the 2005–06 CERS Cup.

Team 1	Agg.	Team 2	1st leg	2nd leg
Barcelona (Spain)	4–5	(Italy) Follonica	3–1	1–4
Dornbirn (Austria)	7–17	(Switzerland) Thunersten	7–7	0–10
Quevert (France)	5–9	(Italy) Prato	1–3	4–6
Oliveirense (Portugal)	2–7	(Italy) Bassano	1–4	1–3
La Vendéenne (France)	1–10	(Portugal) Porto	1–5	0–5
Noia (Spain)	10–3	(Switzerland) Uttigen	6–3	4–0
Reus Deportiu (Spain)	15–3	(Germany) Iserlohn	10–3	5–0
Benfica (Portugal)	4–6	(Spain) Vic	2–2	2–4

== Group stage ==
In each group, teams played against each other home-and-away in a home-and-away round-robin format.

The two first qualified teams advanced to the Final Four.

=== Group A ===
Pos	Team	Pld	W	D	L	GF	GA	GD	Pts	Qualification	FOL	POR	BAS	THU
1	(Italy) Follonica	6	5	1	0	34	17	+17	16	Advance to Final Four	—	3–2	5–2	12–3
2	(Portugal) Porto	6	3	2	1	32	16	+16	11	Advance to Final Four	4–4	—	3–2	11–0
3	(Italy) Bassano	6	2	1	3	28	18	+10	7		2–3	5–5	—	10–2
4	(Switzerland) Thunerstern	6	0	0	6	11	54	−43	0		4–7	2–7	0–7	—

=== Group B ===
Pos	Team	Pld	W	D	L	GF	GA	GD	Pts	Qualification	NOI	REU	VIC	PRA
1	(Spain) Noia	6	4	1	1	16	8	+8	13	Advance to Final Four	—	5–1	1–1	5–1
2	(Spain) Reus Deportiu	6	3	1	2	13	11	+2	10	Advance to Final Four	2–0	—	2–3	4–0
3	(Spain) Vic	6	2	2	2	10	10	0	8		1–2	2–2	—	2–1
4	(Italy) Prato	6	1	0	5	7	17	−10	3		2–3	1–2	2–1	—

== Final four ==
The Final Four was played at the Palácio dos Desportos in Torres Novas, Portugal.

Follonica won its first continental title.

Pos	Team	Pld	W	D	L	GF	GA	GD	Pts	Qualification	FOL	POR	REU	NOI
1	(Italy) Follonica	3	3	0	0	16	9	+7	9	Champion	—	—	3–2	4–3
2	(Portugal) Porto	3	2	0	1	12	13	−1	6		4–9	—	4–3	—
3	(Spain) Reus Deportiu	3	1	0	2	8	7	+1	3		—	—	—	3–0
4	(Spain) Noia	3	0	0	3	4	11	−7	0		—	1–4	—	—

Source: OKCat.cat
