= CP Cerceda =

Spanish roller hockey team

Cerceda
- Full name: Clube Patín Cerceda
- League: OK Liga
- Founded: 2009
- Home ground: Polideportivo Fernando González Laxe, Cerceda, Galicia (Capacity 500)

Personnel
- Chairman: Isabel Bermúdez
- Manager: Juan Copa
| Home | Away |

Clube Patín Cerceda is a Spanish roller hockey team based in Cerceda, Galicia. It currently plays in the OK Liga, the top Spanish league.

== History ==
CP Cerceda was created in 2009, a year after the second team of Liceo de La Coruña won promotion to the OK Liga at the end of the season 2008–2009. Because two teams of the same club can not compete in the same category this team was created and Liceo conceded them the place in the maximum category that had been achieved by Liceo B. Several players and the trainer from Liceo B signed for the new team. 3 new players came from other teams.

Liceo B's name had already been Cerceda Liceo Hockey Club from 2008, when the municipality of Cerceda decided to sponsor the team.

=== 2009–10 season ===
CP Cerceda finished 13th out of 16 in the OK Liga. Last 4 teams get relegated to the second category (Primera División), being CP Cerceda one of them. At the end of the season 6 players left the team, Xevi Meilán and Eduard Lamas left to Liceo de La Coruña, Pablo Cancela and Toni Pérez left to Enrile-PAS Alcoy, Santi Teixidó left to CP Voltregà and Tito Torres quit hockey.

=== 2010–11 season ===
Five new players joined CP Cerceda for this season: Adrián Vallina, Chus Gende, Adrián Boo and Álvaro Rodríguez from Liceo de La Coruña and Jorge González from Club Compañía de María.

=== 2016: resign to OK Liga ===
On 15 July 2016, CP Cerceda announced it resign to its spot in the OK Liga.

== Season by season ==
| Season | Tier | Division | Pos. | Copa del Rey | Europe | |
|---|---|---|---|---|---|---|
| 2009–10 | 1 | OK Liga | 13th | | | |
| 2010–11 | 2 | 1ª División | 6th | | | |
| 2011–12 | 2 | 1ª División | 14th | | | |
| 2012–13 | 2 | 1ª División | 1st | | | |
| 2013–14 | 1 | OK Liga | 9th | Quarterfinalist | | |
| 2014–15 | 1 | OK Liga | 6th | Quarterfinalist | 2 CERS Cup | PR |
| 2015–16 | 1 | OK Liga | 11th | | 2 CERS Cup | PR |

- 4 seasons in OK Liga
- 3 seasons in Primera División

== Honours ==
- Primera División: 1
  - 2012–13

== Notable former players ==
- (Spain) Toni Pérez
- (Spain) Eduard Lamas
