= 2001–02 División de Honor de Hockey Patines =

OK Liga
- Champions: Barcelona Lassa
- Relegated: Chasis Mataró; Tordera; Areces

The 2001–02 División de Honor de Hockey Patines was the 33rd season of the top-tier league of rink hockey in Spain.

Barcelona finished the league as champion, after beating Igualada 3–0 in the finals.

== Competition format ==
Sixteen teams joined the league and the eight first qualified teams at the end of the regular season joined the playoffs.

The three last teams were relegated to Primera División.

== Regular season ==
Pos	Team	Pld	W	D	L	GF	GA	GD	Pts	Qualification or relegation
1	Barcelona (C)	30	27	0	3	159	63	+96	81	Qualification to playoffs
2	Motul Voltregà	30	18	7	5	85	63	+22	61	Qualification to playoffs
3	Noia Freixenet	30	17	5	8	111	86	+25	56	Qualification to playoffs
4	Liceo Vodafone	30	17	5	8	123	84	+39	56	Qualification to playoffs
5	Cirsa Lleida	30	17	4	9	119	99	+20	55	Qualification to playoffs
6	Caprabo Igualada	30	16	7	7	116	88	+28	55	Qualification to playoffs
7	Viva Hàbitat Blanes	30	15	5	10	99	80	+19	50	Qualification to playoffs
8	Cafès Brasilia Reus	30	15	2	13	107	96	+11	47	Qualification to playoffs
9	AstralPool Maçanet	30	12	6	12	88	105	−17	42	
10	Vic	30	12	3	15	100	111	−11	39	
11	Caixa Penedès Vilafranca	30	9	5	16	68	96	−28	32	
12	Factory Alcobendas	30	8	6	16	92	110	−18	30	
13	Cepsa Tenerife	30	7	5	18	84	115	−31	26	
14	Chasis Mataró (R)	30	5	7	18	85	111	−26	22	Relegation to Primera División
15	Tordera (R)	30	4	5	21	103	162	−59	17	Relegation to Primera División
16	Areces (R)	30	3	4	23	79	149	−70	13	Relegation to Primera División

(C) Champions; (R) Relegated

== Playoffs ==
The quarterfinals were played with a best-of-three format, while semifinals and final were played with a best-of-five series.

Seeded teams played games 1 and 3 of the quarterfinals and 1, 2 and 5 of the semifinals and finals at home.

Quarter-finals
Barcelona	5	3 (3)	7
Cafès Brasilia Reus	2	3 (4)	2
Liceo Vodafone	4	3	7
Cirsa Lleida	2	4	3
Voltregà	2	1 (1)
Viva Hàbitat Blanes	3	1 (2)
Noia Freixenet	4	3
Caprabo Igualada	5	4

Quarterfinals
Barcelona	4 (5)	3	5	1	3
Liceo Vodafone	4 (4)	4	2	2	1
Viva Hàbitat Blanes	2	3	1 (1)	4	0
Caprabo Igualada	6	2	1 (2)	2	4

Semifinals
Barcelona	5	3	5
Caprabo Igualada	1	1	2

== Final standings ==
Pos	Team	Qualification or relegation
1	Barcelona	CERH European League
2	Caprabo Igualada	CERH European League
3	Liceo Vodafone	CERH European League
4	Viva Hàbitat Blanes	CERH European League
5	Motul Voltregà	CERS Cup
6	Noia Freixenet	CERS Cup
7	Cirsa Lleida	CERS Cup
8	Cafès Brasilia Reus	CERS Cup
9	AstraPool Maçanet	
10	Vic	
11	Caixa Penedès Vilafranca	
12	Factory Alcobendas	
13	Cepsa Tenerife	
14	Chasis Mataró	Relegation to Primera División
15	Tordera	Relegation to Primera División
16	Areces	Relegation to Primera División

== Copa del Rey ==
2002 Copa del Rey
Tournament details
- Arena: Vic
- Dates: 7–10 March 2002

Final positions
- Champions: Barcelona
- Runners-up: Caprabo Igualada

The 2003 Copa del Rey was the 59th edition of the Spanish men's roller hockey cup. It was played in Vic between the seven first qualified teams after the first half of the season and Vic as host team.

Barcelona won their 14th trophy.

Quarterfinals
7 March
Barcelona	4
Noia Freixenet	1
7 March
Cirsa Lleida	6
Vic	4
8 March
Caprabo Igualada (a.e.t.)	4
Viva Hàbitat Blanes	2
8 March
Motul Voltregà	2
Liceo Vodafone	1

Semifinals
9 March
Barcelona	6
Cirsa Lleida	4
9 March
Motul Voltregà	3
Caprabo Igualada (p)	3

Final
10 March
Barcelona	3
Caprabo Igualada	1
