= 2010–11 CERS Cup =

Tournament details
- Dates: 20 November 2010 – 8 May 2011
- Teams: 27 (from 8 associations)

Final positions
- Champions: (Portugal) Benfica (2nd title)
- Runners-up: (Spain) Vilanova

The 2010–11 CERS Cup was the 31st season of the CERS Cup, Europe's second club roller hockey competition organized by CERH. 28 teams from nine national associations qualified for the competition as a result of their respective national league placing in the previous season. Following a preliminary phase and two knockout rounds, Benfica won the tournament at its final four, in Vilanova i la Geltrú, Spain, on 7 and 8 May 2011.

== Preliminary phase ==
Team 1	Agg.	Team 2	1st leg	2nd leg
Weil (Switzerland)	1–9	(France) Saint-Brieuc	0–4	1–5
Thunersten (Switzerland)	2–10	(Italy) Amatori Lodi	1–2	1–8
Braga (Portugal)	32–2	(England) Middlesbrough	19–1	13–1
Wimmis (Switzerland)	9-6	(Germany) Darmstadt	5–1	4–4
PAS Alcoy (Spain)	6–7	(Italy) Seregno	2–0	4–7
Diessbach (Switzerland)	11–6	(Germany) Walsum	6–4	5–2
Dornbirn (Austria)	3–17	(France) Mérignac	1–8	2–9
Tenerife (Spain)	12–4	(Italy) Sarzana	5–1	7–3
Quévert (France)	3–11	(Portugal) Física	1–3	2–8
La Vendéenne (France)	4–3	(Germany) Iserlohn	3–1	1–2
Herne Bay United (England)	2–16	(Spain) Lloret	2–6	0–10 (Note: Match given to Lloret as Herne Bay United refused to travel due to bad meteorological conditions.)

== Knockout stage ==
The knockout stage consisted in double-legged series for the round of 16 and the quarterfinals, where the four winners would join the Final Four.

Round of 16
(Spain) Igualada	2	1	3
(Portugal) Oliveirense	2	4	6
(Italy) Seregno	2	2	4
(Spain) Vilanova	9	4	13
(France) Saint-Brieuc	7	5	12
(France) La Vendéenne	2	4	6
(Portugal) Braga	15	7	22
(France) Mérignac	5	6	11
(Portugal) Benfica	7	5	12
(Italy) Amatori Lodi	4	7	11
(Spain) Tenerife	2	5	7
(Spain) Lloret	3	7	10
(Switzerland) Wimmis	1	2	3
(Portugal) Física	6	15	21
(Italy) Giovinazzo	6	5	11
(Switzerland) Diessbach	3	5	8

Quarter-finals
(Portugal) Oliveirense	7	1	8
(Spain) Vilanova	4	5	9
(France) Saint-Brieuc	5	1	6
(Portugal) Braga	9	5	14
(Portugal) Benfica	6	6	12
(Spain) Lloret	0	3	3
(Portugal) Física	6	7	13
(Italy) Giovinazzo	3	3	6

Semi-finals
(Spain) Vilanova	5
(Portugal) Braga	3
(Portugal) Benfica	4
(Portugal) Física	1

Final
(Spain) Vilanova	4
(Portugal) Benfica	6

2011 CERS Cup winners
(Portugal)
Benfica
Second title

== See also ==
- 2011–12 CERH European League
- 2011–12 CERH Women's European League
