= 2003–04 OK Liga =

- League: OK Liga
- Sport: Roller hockey
- League champions: Barcelona Excelent
- Runners-up: Barna Work Igualada
- Relegated to Primera División: Cibeles Deasa; Alcobendas; Tordera

OK Liga seasons
- ← 2002–03 2004–05 →

The 2003–04 OK Liga was the 35th season of the top-tier league of rink hockey in Spain.

Barcelona Excelent finished the league as champion.

== Competition format ==
Sixteen teams joined the league.

The eight first teams at the end of the regular season qualified for the playoffs while the three last teams were relegated to Primera División.

== Regular season ==
Pos	Team	Pld	W	D	L	GF	GA	GD	Pts	Qualification or relegation
1	Barcelona Excelent	30	24	3	3	132	47	+85	75	Qualification to playoffs
2	Alnimar Reus Deportiu	30	20	5	5	103	55	+48	65	Qualification to playoffs
3	Barna Work Igualada	30	17	6	7	99	63	+36	57	Qualification to playoffs
4	Noia Freixenet	30	16	6	8	73	61	+12	54	Qualification to playoffs
5	Liceo Vodafone	30	16	2	12	95	87	+8	50	Qualification to playoffs
6	Roncato Vic	30	15	5	10	105	89	+16	50	Qualification to playoffs
7	Grup Castillo Lleida	30	13	10	7	92	75	+17	49	Qualification to playoffs
8	Cemex Tenerife	30	11	6	13	102	107	−5	39	Qualification to playoffs
9	Viva Hàbitat Blanes	30	10	6	14	68	71	−3	36	
10	Celta Voltregà	30	9	8	13	93	95	−2	35	
11	Vilanova L'Ull Blau	30	9	8	13	98	116	−18	35	
12	Lloret	30	9	5	16	82	97	−15	32	
13	Aiscondel Vila-seca	30	9	4	17	81	103	−22	31	
14	Cibeles Deasa	30	9	1	20	80	123	−43	28	Relegation to Primera División
15	Alcobendas	30	8	3	19	73	120	−47	27	Relegation to Primera División
16	Tordera	30	3	6	21	83	150	−67	15	Relegation to Primera División

== Playoffs ==
All series were played with a best-of-five series.

Seeded teams played games 1, 2 and 5 of the series at home.

Quarterfinals
Barcelona Excelent	6	5	7
Cemex Tenerife	2	2	2
Noia Freixenet	3	3	1	3
Liceo Vodafone	7	2	3	4
Alnimar Reus Deportiu	2	2	0	3	5
Grup Castillo Lleida	4	1	1	2	4
Barna Work Igualada	8	4	1	3	4
Roncato Vic	1	3	4	3	0

Semifinals
Barcelona Excelent	5	3	6
Liceo Vodafone	2	0	2
Alnimar Reus Deportiu	4	6	1	3	2
Barna Work Igualada	1	5	2	5	4

Finals
Barcelona Excelent	7	6	7
Barna Work Igualada	1	2	4

== Final standings ==
Pos	Team	Qualification or relegation
1	Barcelona Excelent	CERH European League
2	Barna Work Igualada	CERH European League
3	Alnimar Reus Deportiu	CERH European League
4	Liceo Vodafone	CERH European League
5	Noia Freixenet	CERS Cup
6	Roncato Vic	CERS Cup
7	Grup Castillo Lleida	CERS Cup
8	Cemex Tenerife	
9	Viva Hàbitat Blanes	
10	Leche Celta Voltregà	
11	Vilanova L'Ull Blau	
12	Lloret	
13	Aiscondel Vila-seca	
14	Cibeles Deasa	Relegation to Primera División
15	Alcobendas	Relegation to Primera División
16	Tordera	Relegation to Primera División

== Copa del Rey ==
2004 Copa del Rey
Tournament details
- Arena: Jerez de la Frontera
- Dates: 25–28 March 2004

Final positions
- Champions: Liceo Vodafone
- Runners-up: Barna Work Igualada

The 2004 Copa del Rey was the 61st edition of the Spanish men's roller hockey cup. It was played in Reus between the eight first qualified teams after the first half of the season.

Liceo Vodafone won its ninth title, the first one since 1997.

Quarterfinals
25 March
Barcelona Excelent	4
Grup Castillo Lleida	1
25 March
Liceo Vodafone	4
Roncato Vic	3
26 March
Barna Work Igualada	3
Viva Hàbitat Blanes	2
10 March
Noia Freixenet	2
Alnimar Reus Deportiu (p)	2

Semifinals
27 March
Barcelona Excelent	3
Liceo Vodafone (p)	3
27 March
Barna Work Igualada (p)	3
Alnimar Reus Deportiu	3

Final
28 March
Liceo Vodafone	2
Barna Work Igualada	0
