= CP Vic =

- Full name: Club Patí Vic
- League: OK Liga
- Founded: 1951
- Home ground: Pavelló del Club Patí Vic, Vic, Catalonia, Spain (Capacity 3,500)

Personnel
- Manager: (Spain) Joaquim López
Home

Club Patí Vic is a Spanish rink hockey club based in Vic, in the autonomous community of Catalonia. Founded in 1951, the club currently plays in the OK Liga, holding its home games at the Pavelló del Club Patí Vic, with capacity of 3,500 seats.

== History ==
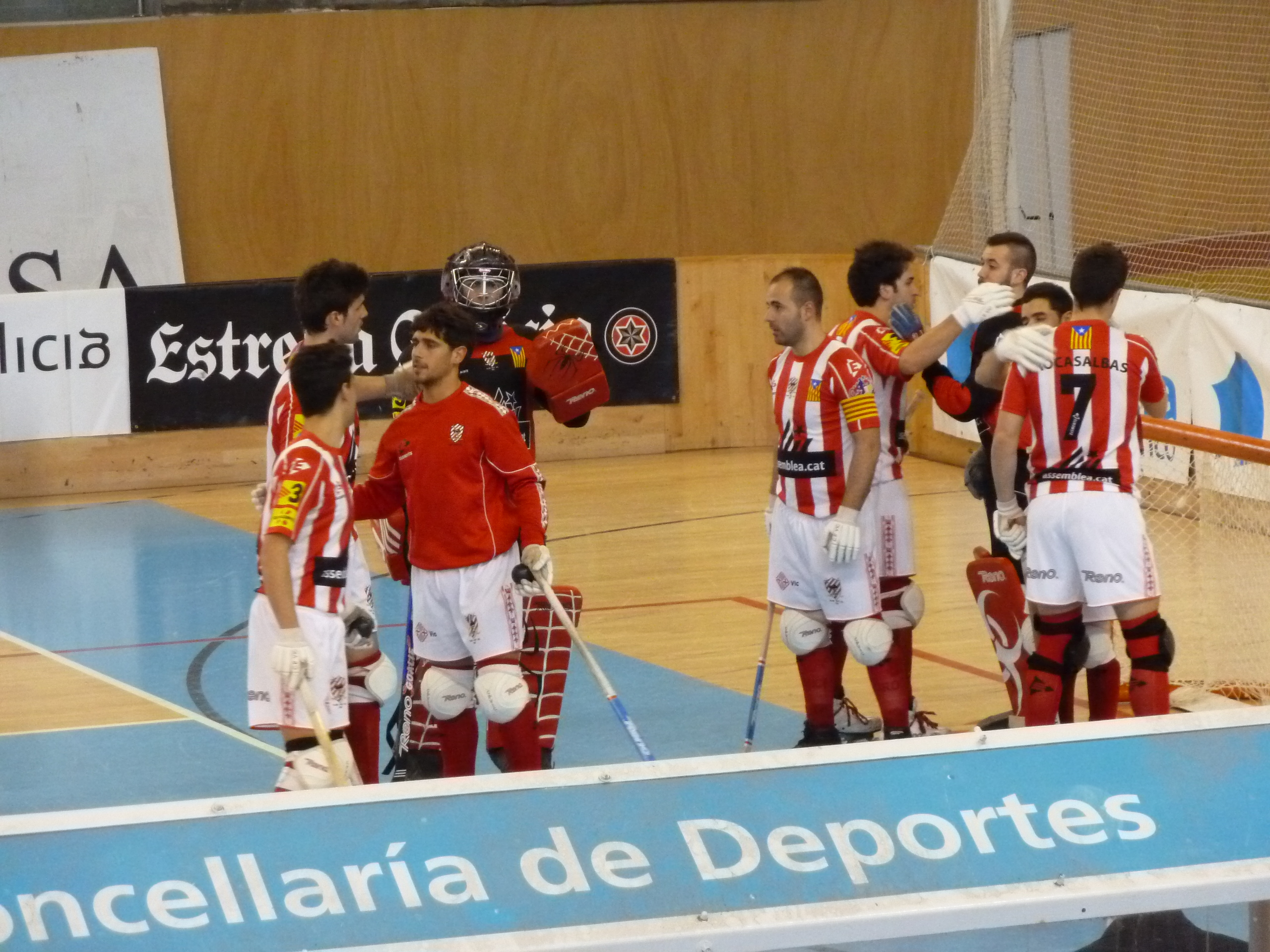
Vic players, against Liceo in 2012.

Founded in 1951, CP Vic is the oldest hockey club in the Catalan comarca of Osona. In the 1970s, the club acquired some terrains for its own development and its main arena was used for the 1992 Summer Olympics.

In 1999, CP Vic won its first national title by conquering the Copa del Rey, repeating this achievement in 2009, 2010 and most recently, in 2015.

In 2001, the club won its first European title by defeating Noia in the CERS Cup final. Vic also played three times the final of the CERH European League, but could not lift yet the trophy of the top European competition.

The club's last title was the Intercontinental Cup won in 2016 against Argentine club Huracán by 5–1. However, this title is not considered as official by the CERS.

== Season to season ==
Season	Tier	Division	Pos.	Copa del Rey	Supercopa	Europe	
2001–02	1	OK Liga	10th		—N/a	1 European League	GS
2002–03	1	OK Liga	3rd	Runner-up	—N/a		
2003–04	1	OK Liga	6th	Quarterfinalist	—N/a	1 European League	GS
2004–05	1	OK Liga	4th	Runner-up		2 CERS Cup	PR
2005–06	1	OK Liga	3rd	Semifinalist	Runner-up	1 European League	GS
2006–07	1	OK Liga	5th	Quarterfinalist		1 European League	SF
2007–08	1	OK Liga	5th	Runner-up		1 European League	SF
2008–09	1	OK Liga	3rd	Champion		1 European League	RU
2009–10	1	OK Liga	3rd	Champion	Champion	1 European League	RU
2010–11	1	OK Liga	7th	Semifinalist	Champion	1 European League	GS
2011–12	1	OK Liga	10th			1 European League	GS
2012–13	1	OK Liga	5th	Quarterfinalist		2 CERS Cup	RU
2013–14	1	OK Liga	3rd	Semifinalist		2 CERS Cup	QF
2014–15	1	OK Liga	4th	Champion		1 European League	RU
2015–16	1	OK Liga	2nd	Runner-up	Semifinalist	1 European League	QF
2016–17	1	OK Liga	4th	Semifinalist	Semifinalist	1 European League	GS
2017–18	1	OK Liga	11th			1 European League	GS
2018–19	1	OK Liga	11th				

== Trophies ==
- OK Liga:
  - runners-up (3)
- Copa del Rey: 4
  - 1999, 2009, 2010, 2015
- Supercopa de España: 2
  - 2009, 2010
- European Cup/Champions League:
  - runners-up (3)
- CERS Cup: 1
  - 2001
