= Poliesportiu d'Andorra =

Indoor sporting arena in Andorra la Vella

Coordinates: 42°30′17.4″N 1°30′59.9″E

- La BMB
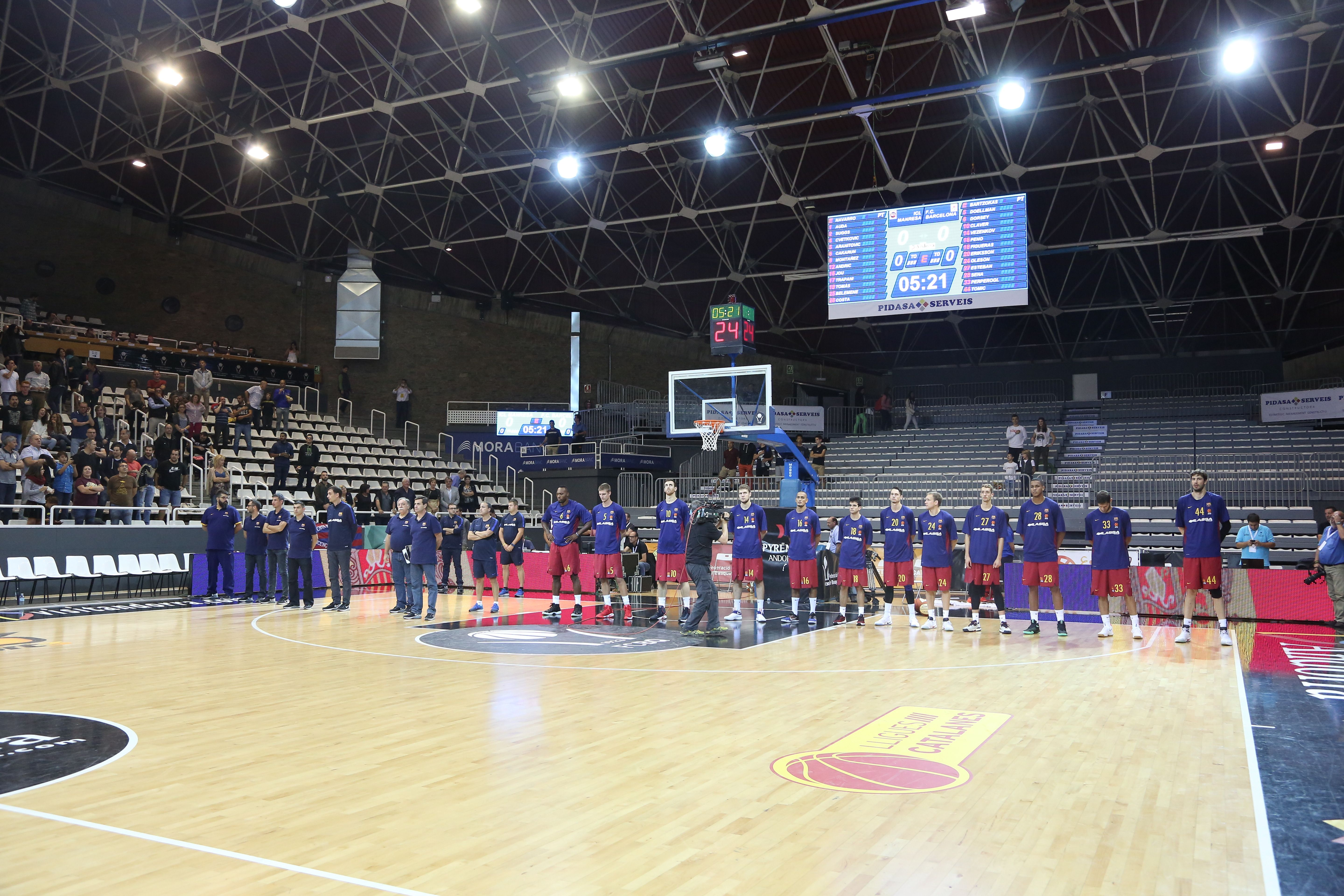
- Interactive map of Poliesportiu d'Andorra
- Location: Andorra La Vella, Andorra
- Capacity: 5,000
- Surface: Parquet Floor
- Record attendance: 5,012; Festina Andorra v Real Madrid (24 January 1993)

Construction
- Opened: 1991
- Expanded: 1993, 2014

Tenant
- BC Andorra

Poliesportiu d'Andorra, also known as Pavelló Toni Martí, is an indoor sporting arena located in Andorra la Vella, Andorra.

== History ==
Opened in 1991, the initial capacity of the arena was 3,000 people. It was temporarily expanded to 5,000 with additional seats from 1993 to 1996 when BC Andorra played in Liga ACB. It also hosts various sporting events such as team handball and futsal matches.

In 2011, the Poliesportiu d'Andorra hosted the Final Eight of the roller hockey's European League and the 2021 WSE Cup.

In 2014, after the second promotion of BC Andorra to the Spanish top basketball league, the National Government decided to expand the arena to 5,000 seats. The venue has other complementary spaces such as a weight training gym, meeting rooms and VIP spaces.

== League attendances ==
This is a list of games attendances of BC Andorra at Poliesportiu d'Andorra since its expansion in 2014.

Liga ACB					European competitions				
Season	Total	High	Low	Average	Season	Total	High	Low	Average
2014–15	61,181	4,774	2,480	3,599	Did not enter any European competition				
2015–16	68,625	4,630	3,623	4,037	Did not enter any European competition				
2016–17	71,869	4,873	3,423	4,228	Did not enter any European competition				
2017–18	76,032	5,000	3,620	4,224	2017–18 EC	15,642	3,479	2,462	3,128
2018–19	68,778	4,500	3,518	4,046	2018–19 EC	29,775	4,124	1,874	2,978
2019–20 (Note: Season suspended due to the COVID-19 pandemic.)	47,888	4,523	3,194	3,991	2019–20 EC	19,597	3,614	1,790	2,450
