= CP Tenerife =

Spanish roller hockey club

Tenerife
- Full name: Club Patín Tenerife
- Founded: 1970
- Dissolved: 2011
- Home ground: Santa Cruz de Tenerife, Canary Islands
Home

Club Patín Tenerife was a Spanish rink hockey club from Santa Cruz de Tenerife, Canary Islands.

== History ==
Founded in 1970, Tenerife promoted for the first time to the first division in 1982, but was immediately relegated in the next season. Fifteen years later, it promoted again to the top tier, where they remained until 2011.

In 2008, Tenerife conquered the CERS Cup and made the debut in the next season of the European League.

Three years later, the club relegated to Primera División but did not join the competition as it was dissolved due to the financial trouble.

== Season to season ==
=== Men's team ===
Season	Tier	Division	Pos.	Copa del Rey	Europe	
2000–01	2	1ª División	3rd			
2001–02	1	OK Liga	13th			
2002–03	1	OK Liga	11th			
2003–04	1	OK Liga	8th			
2004–05	1	OK Liga	10th			
2005–06	1	OK Liga	6th	Quarterfinalist		
2006–07	1	OK Liga	8th		2 CERS Cup	R16
2007–08	1	OK Liga	7th	Quarterfinalist	2 CERS Cup	C
2008–09	1	OK Liga	13th		1 European League	GS
2009–10	1	OK Liga	8th	Quarterfinalist		
2010–11	1	OK Liga	12th		2 CERS Cup	R16

== Trophies ==
- CERS Cup: 1
  - 2008
