= Mario Agüero (roller hockey) =

Argentine roller hockey player (1957–2025)

Mario Rodolfo Agüero (Spanish: [ˈmaɾjo roˈðolfo aˈɣweɾo]; 25 June 1957 – 6 August 2025) was an Argentine roller hockey player.

== Life and career ==
Agüero began playing roller hockey in Argentina, Spain and Italy and played for HC Liceo during the 1981–82 and 1982–83 seasons. During his time with the club, the team won both the Copa del Rey and the CERS Cup.

Agüero died on 6 August 2025, at the age of 68.
