= 2002–03 CERH European League =

Tournament details
- Teams: 18

Final positions
- Champions: Liceo (4th title)
- Runners-up: Igualada

The 2002–03 CERH European League was the 38th edition of the CERH European League organized by CERH. Its Final Four was held on 10 and 11 May 2004 at Pazo dos Deportes de Riazor, in A Coruña, Spain.

== Preliminary round ==
Team 1	Agg.	Team 2	1st leg	2nd leg
Dornbirn (Austria)	3–30	(Germany) Cronenberg	1–5	2–25
Nantes (France)	5–9	(Switzerland) Uttigen	3–2	2–7

== First round ==
Team 1	Agg.	Team 2	1st leg	2nd leg
Igualada (Spain)	17–4	(France) Saint-Omer	10–1	7–3
Thunerstern (Switzerland)	4–14	(Portugal) Porto	3–6	1–8
Benfica (Portugal)	13–2	(Switzerland) Genève	10–1	3–1
Novara (Italy)	10–6	(Germany) Cronenberg	5–2	5–4
Quévert (France)	6–7	(Switzerland) Uttigen	2–4	4–3
Blanes (Spain)	4–5	(Spain) Liceo	2–3	2–2
Bassano (Italy)	2–19	(Spain) Barcelona	0–8	2–11
Barcelos (Portugal)	8–9	(Italy) Prato	4–3	4–6

== Group stage ==
In each group, teams played against each other home-and-away in a home-and-away round-robin format.

The two first qualified teams advanced to the Final Four.

=== Group A ===
Pos	Team	Pld	W	D	L	GF	GA	GD	Pts	Qualification	BAR	PRA	BEN	NOV
1	(Spain) Barcelona	6	5	1	0	31	7	+24	11	Advance to Final Four	—	9–1	6–1	6–2
2	(Italy) Prato	6	4	1	1	32	19	+13	9	Advance to Final Four	1–1	—	4–1	13–1
3	(Portugal) Benfica	6	2	0	4	15	23	−8	4		1–4	6–7	—	2–1
4	(Italy) Novara	6	0	0	6	7	36	−29	0		1–5	1–6	1–4	—

=== Group B ===
Pos	Team	Pld	W	D	L	GF	GA	GD	Pts	Qualification	IGU	LIC	POR	UTT
1	(Spain) Igualada	6	4	1	1	28	10	+18	9	Advance to Final Four	—	3–1	7–2	12–0
2	(Spain) Liceo	6	4	0	2	24	15	+9	8	Advance to Final Four	4–0	—	3–4	7–1
3	(Portugal) Porto	6	3	1	2	26	22	+4	7		2–2	4–5	—	10–2
4	(Switzerland) Uttigen	6	0	0	6	10	41	−31	0		1–4	3–4	3–4	—

== Final four ==
The Final Four was played at Pazo dos Deportes de Riazor, in A Coruña, Spain.

Home team Liceo achieved its 4th title. Al games were decided after a penalty shootout.

=== Bracket ===
Semifinals
10 May
(Spain) Liceo	1 (3)
(Spain) Barcelona	1 (1)
10 May
(Spain) Igualada	1 (4)
(Italy) Prato	1 (3)

Final
11 May
(Spain) Liceo	2 (4)
(Spain) Igualada	2 (3)
