= 2004–05 CERH European League =

Tournament details
- Teams: 15

Final positions
- Champions: Barcelona (16th title)
- Runners-up: Porto

The 2004–05 CERH European League was the 40th edition of the CERH European League organized by CERH. Its Final Four was held on 14 and 15 May 2007 at the Pavelló d'Esports, in Reus, Spain.

== Preliminary round ==
The eliminated teams joined the CERS Cup. Uttigen received a wildcard after the draw.

Team 1	Agg.	Team 2	1st leg	2nd leg
Quévert (France)	3–13	(Spain) Barcelona	1–5	2–8
Saint-Omer (France)	5–13	(Portugal) Barcelos	2–7	3–6
Igualada (Spain)	6–3	(Italy) Bassano	4–0	2–3
La Vendéenne (France)	2–14	(Spain) Reus Deportiu	0–6	2–8
Salerno (Italy)	6–5	(Spain) Liceo	2–3	4–2
Oliveirense (Portugal)	8–4	(Italy) Prato	5–3	3–1
Porto (Portugal)	11–6	(Switzerland) Thunerstern	11–1	0–5

== Group stage ==
In each group, teams played against each other home-and-away in a home-and-away round-robin format.

The two first qualified teams advanced to the Final Four.

=== Group A ===
Pos	Team	Pld	W	D	L	GF	GA	GD	Pts	Qualification	BAR	OLI	IGU	UTT
1	(Spain) Barcelona	6	5	0	1	42	29	+13	10	Advance to Final Four	—	2–3	6–1	17–3
2	(Portugal) Oliveirense	6	4	0	2	36	23	+13	8	Advance to Final Four	3–6	—	5–4	22–2
3	(Spain) Igualada	6	3	0	3	37	15	+22	6		1–4	8–0	—	16–0
4	(Switzerland) Uttigen	6	0	0	6	8	72	−64	0		2–7	1–3	0–7	—

Source: Rinkhockey.net

=== Group B ===
Pos	Team	Pld	W	D	L	GF	GA	GD	Pts	Qualification	POR	REU	BCS	SAL
1	(Portugal) Porto	6	6	0	0	24	6	+18	12	Advance to Final Four	—	3–0	4–1	7–1
2	(Spain) Reus Deportiu	6	4	0	2	22	8	+14	8	Advance to Final Four	2–3	—	2–0	6–0
3	(Portugal) Barcelos	6	2	0	4	12	18	−6	4		2–3	0–5	—	3–2
4	(Italy) Salerno	6	0	0	6	7	33	−26	0		0–4	2–7	2–6	—

Source: Rinkhockey.net

== Final four ==
The Final Four was played at Palau d'Esports del Reus Deportiu, in Reus, Spain.

Barcelona achieved its 16th title.

=== Bracket ===
Semifinals
14 May
(Spain) Reus Deportiu	4
(Spain) Barcelona (g.g.)	5
14 May
(Portugal) Oliveirense	4
(Portugal) Porto (p)	4

Final
15 May
(Spain) Barcelona	3
(Portugal) Porto	2
