= 2007–08 OK Liga =

- League: OK Liga
- Sport: Roller hockey
- League champions: Barcelona Sorli Discau
- Runners-up: Alnimar Reus Deportiu
- Relegated to Primera División: Epson Cerdanyola; Caixa Penedès Vilafranca; Esfer Oviedo

OK Liga seasons
- ← 2006–07 2008–09 →

The 2007–08 OK Liga was the 39th season of the top-tier league of rink hockey in Spain.

Barcelona Sorli Discau finished the league as champion.

== Competition format ==
Sixteen teams joined the league.

The eight first teams at the end of the regular season qualified for the playoffs while the three last teams were relegated to Primera División.

== Regular season ==
Pos	Team	Pld	W	D	L	GF	GA	GD	Pts	Qualification or relegation
1	Barcelona Sorli Discau	30	25	3	2	123	48	+75	78	Qualification to playoffs
2	Alnimar Reus Deportiu	33	20	9	4	113	71	+42	69	Qualification to playoffs
3	Coinasa Liceo	30	16	5	9	92	66	+26	53	Qualification to playoffs
4	Roncato Vic	30	15	7	8	70	47	+23	52	Qualification to playoffs
5	Noia Freixenet	30	15	6	9	77	66	+11	51	Qualification to playoffs
6	Viva Hàbitat Blanes	30	15	4	11	70	57	+13	49	Qualification to playoffs
7	Cemex Tenerife	30	13	8	9	90	83	+7	47	Qualification to playoffs
8	Proinosa Igualada	30	13	6	11	85	78	+7	45	Qualification to playoffs
9	Grup Clima Mataró	30	13	4	13	77	78	−1	43	
10	Vilanova L'Ull Blau	30	10	8	12	64	75	−11	38	
11	Grup Castillo Lleida	30	8	7	15	73	87	−14	31	
12	Grup Lloret	30	7	9	14	58	82	−24	30	
13	Güell Voltregà	30	6	11	13	63	92	−29	29	
14	Epson Cerdanyola	30	8	5	17	70	94	−24	29	Relegation to Primera División
15	Caixa Penedès Vilafranca	30	8	4	18	65	94	−29	28	Relegation to Primera División
16	Esfer Oviedo	30	2	2	26	51	123	−72	8	Relegation to Primera División

== Playoffs ==
Quarterfinals were played with a best-of-three format, while semifinals and final were played with a best-of-five series.

Seeded teams played games 1, 2 and 5 of each series at home.

Quarterfinals
Barcelona Sorli Discau	5	2	5
Proinosa Igualada	4	1	4
Roncato Vic	4 (0)	4	1	3
Noia Freixenet	4 (1)	2	4	5
Alnimar Reus Deportiu	1 (1)	3	2	3	3
Cemex Tenerife	1 (2)	2	2	5	0
Coinasa Liceo	2	3 (1)	1	0	6
Viva Hàbitat Blanes	0	3 (1)	3	5	0

Semifinals
Barcelona Sorli Discau	3	4	3	3
Noia Freixenet	5	1	2	1
Alnimar Reus Deportiu	4	2	3 (1)
Coinasa Liceo	1	1	3 (0)

Finals
Barcelona Sorli Discau	7	2	3 (1)	4	5
Alnimar Reus Deportiu	0	3	3 (2)	3	2

== Final standings ==
Pos	Team	Qualification or relegation
1	Barcelona Sorli Discau	CERH European League
2	Alnimar Reus Deportiu	CERH European League
3	Coinasa Liceo	CERH European League
4	Noia Freixenet	CERH European League
5	Roncato Vic	CERH European League
6	Viva Hàbitat Blanes	CERS Cup
7	Cemex Tenerife	CERH European League
8	Proinosa Igualada	CERH European League
9	Grup Clima Mataró	CERS Cup
10	Vilanova L'Ull Blau	CERH European League
11	Grup Castillo Lleida	
12	Grup Lloret	CERS Cup
13	Güell Voltregà	
14	Epson Cerdanyola	Relegation to Primera División
15	Caixa Penedès Vilafranca	Relegation to Primera División
16	Esfer Oviedo	Relegation to Primera División

== Copa del Rey ==
2008 Copa del Rey
Tournament details
- Arena: Poliesportiu Les Comes, Igualada
- Dates: 28 February–2 March 2008

Final positions
- Champions: Noia Freixenet
- Runners-up: Roncato Vic

The 2008 Copa del Rey was the 65th edition of the Spanish men's roller hockey cup. It was played in Igualada between the eight first qualified teams after the first half of the season.

Noia Freixenet won its 2nd cup, ten years after its first one.

Quarterfinals
28 February
Alnimar Reus Deportiu	3
Cemex Tenerife	1
28 February
Roncato Vic	3
Proinosa Igualada	1
29 February
Barcelona Sorli Discau	2
Liceo Vodafone	3
29 February
Noia Freixenet	3
Viva Hàbitat Blanes	2

Semifinals
1 March
Alnimar Reus Deportiu	2
Roncato Vic	3
1 March
Liceo Vodafone	1
Noia Freixenet	3

Final
1 March
Roncato Vic	2
Noia Freixenet	3
