= 2006–07 CERS Cup =

Tournament details
- Dates: 4 November 2006 – 18 March 2007
- Teams: 19 (from 7 associations)

Final positions
- Champions: (Spain) Vilanova (1st title)
- Runners-up: (Portugal) Candelária

The 2005–06 CERS Cup was the 27th season of the CERS Cup, Europe's second club roller hockey competition organized by CERH. 19 teams from seven national associations qualified for the competition as a result of their respective national league placing in the previous season. Following a preliminary phase and four knockout rounds, Vilanova won its first title.

== Preliminary phase ==
Team 1	Agg.	Team 2	1st leg	2nd leg
Candelária (Portugal)	14–2	(Switzerland) Uttigen	8–2	6–0
Tenerife (Spain)	27–5	(England) Bury St. Edmunds	18–5	9–0
Germania Herringen (Germany)	9–11	(France) Mérignac	2–6	7–5

== Knockout stage ==
Round of 16
(Spain) Igualada	11	5	16
(France) Saint-Omer	1	2	3
(Portugal) Candelária	11	7	18
(Switzerland) Wimmis	0	6	6
(Italy) Novara	4	3	7
(Switzerland) Thunerstern	0	0	0
(Italy) Salerno	1	1	2
(France) La Vendéenne	1	2	3
(France) Quévert	0	1	1
(Italy) Valdagno	2	7	9
(Spain) Tenerife	2	3	5
(Spain) Vilanova	3	4	7
(Switzerland) Uttigen	6	1	7
(France) Ploufragan	5	8	13
(Germany) Reimscheid	2	3	5
(France) Mérignac	1	9	10

Quarter-finals
(Spain) Igualada	1	1	2
(Portugal) Candelária	3	1	4
(Italy) Novara	8	6	14
(France) La Vendéenne	2	4	6
(Italy) Valdagno	3	1	4
(Spain) Vilanova	4	5	9
(France) Ploufragan	5	4	9
(France) Mérignac	5	6	11

Semi-finals
(Portugal) Candelária	4	4	8
(Italy) Novara	2	3	5
(Spain) Vilanova	4	3	7
(France) Mérignac	1	2	3

Final
(Portugal) Candelária	1	2	3
(Spain) Vilanova	1	4	5

2007 CERS Cup winners
(Spain)
Vilanova
First title

== See also ==
- 2006–07 CERH European League
- 2007 CERH Women's European Cup
