= Reus Deportiu =

- Full name: Reus Deportiu
- League: M: OK Liga; W: OK Liga Femenina
- Founded: 1909
- Home ground: Pavelló del Reus Deportiu, Reus, Catalonia, Spain (Capacity 2,500)

Personnel
- Chairman: Monica Balsells
Home

Reus Deportiu is a Catalan sports club best known for its professional roller hockey team based in Reus, Catalonia, Spain.

== History ==
CD Reus was founded on 23 November 1909 after the dissolution of Reus Sport Club. On 29 September 1917, the club merged with Club Velocipedista and SC Olímpia becoming the multi-sports club Reus Deportiu. In 1951, Reus Deportiu was restructured into two independent entities: CF Reus Deportiu, entirely dedicated to football, and Reus Deportiu, for the rest of the sections. Apart from the roller hockey team, which plays in the OK Liga, it also has athletics, basketball, chess, rhythmic gymnastics, hiking, karate, artistic roller skating, rugby, table tennis and tennis sections.

Reus enjoyed its golden era between 1967 and 1973, winning six European Cups in a row, four Spanish Leagues and four national Cups. One decade later, it won the 1983 national Cup and Supercup and the 1984 Cup Winners' Cup.

The club had to wait nearly two decades for its next trophies, the CERS Cup in 2003 and 2004. In subsequent years Reus won its sixth national cup in 2006, the World Championship in 2008 and its seventh European League in 2009 plus the consequent Continental Cup and Intercontinental Cup.

In 2011, Reus Deportiu achieved its eighth OK Liga in 2011, 38 years after their last title of the national League. On 14 May 2017, Reus conquered its eighth European League, exactly 50 years after the first one in the history of the club.

=== Women's team ===
In addition to these achievements, Reus Deportiu created a women's section in 2007 that would get a vacant berth in the women's OK Liga in 2011, but would resign to continue in the first division two years later, due to the financial problems of the club.

Six years later, the club came back after finishing in the third position of the Nacional Catalana and the resigns of HC Borbolla and CP Coslada to promote.

== Season to season ==
=== Men's team ===
Season	Tier	Division	Pos.	Copa del Rey	Supercopa	Europe	
2001–02	1	OK Liga	8th		—N/a	1 European League	SF
2002–03	1	OK Liga	4th		—N/a	2 CERS Cup	C
2003–04	1	OK Liga	3rd	Semifinalist	—N/a	2 CERS Cup	C
2004–05	1	OK Liga	2nd	Semifinalist		1 European League	SF
2005–06	1	OK Liga	2nd	Champion		1 European League	3rd
2006–07	1	OK Liga	2nd	Runner-up	Champion	1 European League	GS
2007–08	1	OK Liga	2nd	Semifinalist	Runner-up	1 European League	RU
2008–09	1	OK Liga	4th	Semifinalist		1 European League	C
2009–10	1	OK Liga	4th	Quarterfinalist		1 European League	L6
2010–11	1	OK Liga	1st	Runner-up		1 European League	RU
2011–12	1	OK Liga	5th	Quarterfinalist	Runner-up	1 European League	SF
2012–13	1	OK Liga	4th	Runner-up		1 European League	QF
2013–14	1	OK Liga	4th	Semifinalist	Runner-up	1 European League	QF
2014–15	1	OK Liga	5th	Quarterfinalist	Semifinalist	2 CERS Cup	RU
2015–16	1	OK Liga	4th	Quarterfinalist		2 CERS Cup	QF
2016–17	1	OK Liga	2nd	Runner-up	Runner-up	1 European League	C
2017–18	1	OK Liga	3rd	Semifinalist	Semifinalist	1 European League	SF
2018–19	1	OK Liga	3rd	Quarterfinalist	Semifinalist	1 European League	GS
2019–20	1	OK Liga			Champion	1 European League	

=== Women's team ===
Season	Tier	Division	Pos.	Copa de la Reina
2009–10	2	Nacional	12th (Note: Remained in the league.)	
2010–11	2	Nacional	4th	
2011–12	1	OK Liga	6th	Semifinalist
2012–13	1	OK Liga	5th (Note: Resigned to continue playing in OK Liga.)	Semifinalist
2013–14	2	Nacional	3rd	
2014–15	2	Nacional	11th	
2015–16	2	Nacional	10th	
2016–17	2	Nacional	3rd (Note: Promoted thanks to the resignation of other teams.)	
2017–18	1	OK Liga	13th	
2018–19	1	OK Liga	12th	

== Trophies ==
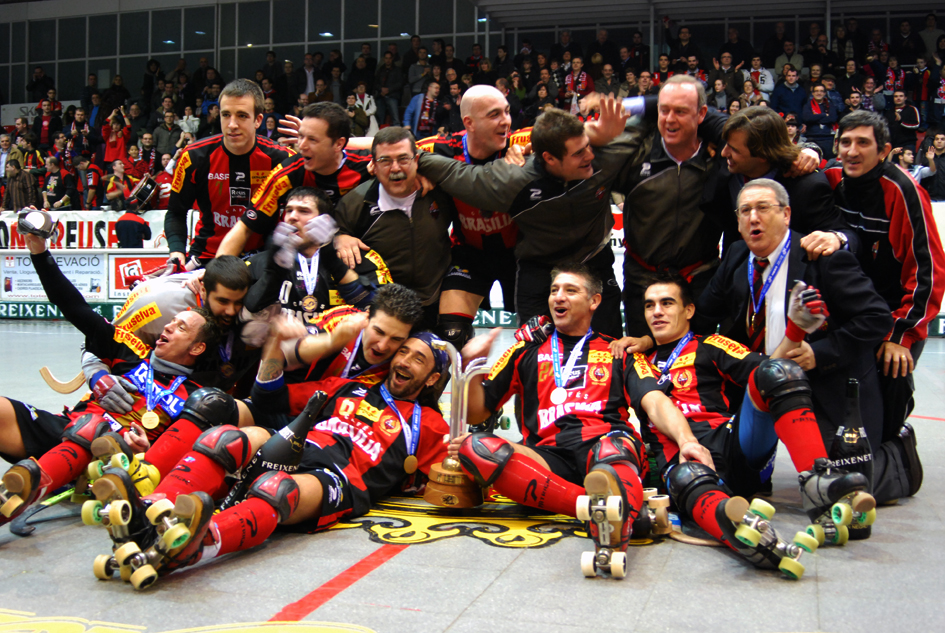
2009 Intercontinental Cup winners

- Campeonato de España: 2
  - 1947, 1952.
- Liga Nacional: 3
  - 1965–66, 1966–67, 1968–69.
- OK Liga: 5
  - 1969–70, 1970–71, 1971–72, 1972–73, 2010–11.
- Copa del Rey: 6
  - 1966, 1970, 1971, 1973, 1983, 2006.
- Supercopa de España: 2
  - 2006, 2019.
- European Cup/Champions League: 8
  - 1967, 1968, 1969, 1970, 1971, 1972, 2009, 2017.
- CERS Cup : 2
  - 2003, 2004.
- Cup Winners Cup : 1
  - 1984.
- Continental Cup/European Super Cup: 1
  - 2009.
- World Club Championship: 1
  - 2008.
- Intercontinental Cup: 1
  - 2009.
- Catalan Championships: 1
  - 1967.
- Little World Cup: 1
  - 1969.

== Presidents ==
- Joan Solé Anguera 1909–1913
- Josep Balsells Bofarull 1913–1916
- Pere Barrufet Puig 1916–1917
- Salvador Bonet Marsillach 1917–1918
- Joaquim Gibert Gras 1918–1919
- Joan Martorell Alegret 1919–1920
- Josep Valls Fonts 1920–1922
- Joan Domenech Mas 1922–1924
- Josep Llop Martorell 1926–1928
- Antoni Martí Bages 1929–1933
- Agustí Esteve Fabregat 1933–1934
- Joan Busquets Crusat 1934–1942
- Josep Castellà Baró 1942–1943
- Antoni Sabater Esteve 1943–1948
- Francesc Llevat Rosell 1948–1952
- Baldomer Pamies Jové 1953–1957
- Antoni Sabater Roca 1957–1959
- Josep Maria Massó Coll 1959–1966
- Francesc Llevat Rosell 1966–1970
- Joan Domenech Mas 1970–1971
- Valero Camps Simó 1971–1973
- Andreu Olest Cabrito 1973–1977
- Joan Basora Musté 1977–1986
- Pere Vinaixa Ollé 1987–1995
- Joan Sabater Escudé 1995–2011
- Mònica Balsells Pere 2011–present
