= Pavelló del Club Patí Vic =

The Pavelló del Club Patí Vic is an indoor arena located in Vic, Catalonia, Spain. This venue was one of the hosts for the demonstration roller hockey competitions at the 1992 Summer Olympics. It's the home place of CP Vic.
