= Igualada HC =

Catalan roller hockey club

Monbús Igualada
- Full name: Igualada Hoquei Club
- Nickname(s): Arlequinats
- League: OK Liga
- Founded: 1950
- Home ground: Les Comes, Igualada, Catalonia, Spain (Capacity 3,000)

Personnel
- Chairman: Manel Burón
- Manager: Cesc Monclús
Home

Igualada Hoquei Club is a Catalan roller hockey club based in Igualada, Catalonia, Spain. The Pavelló Poliesportiu Les Comes, with a capacity of 3,000 seats, currently serves as its pavilion.

== History ==
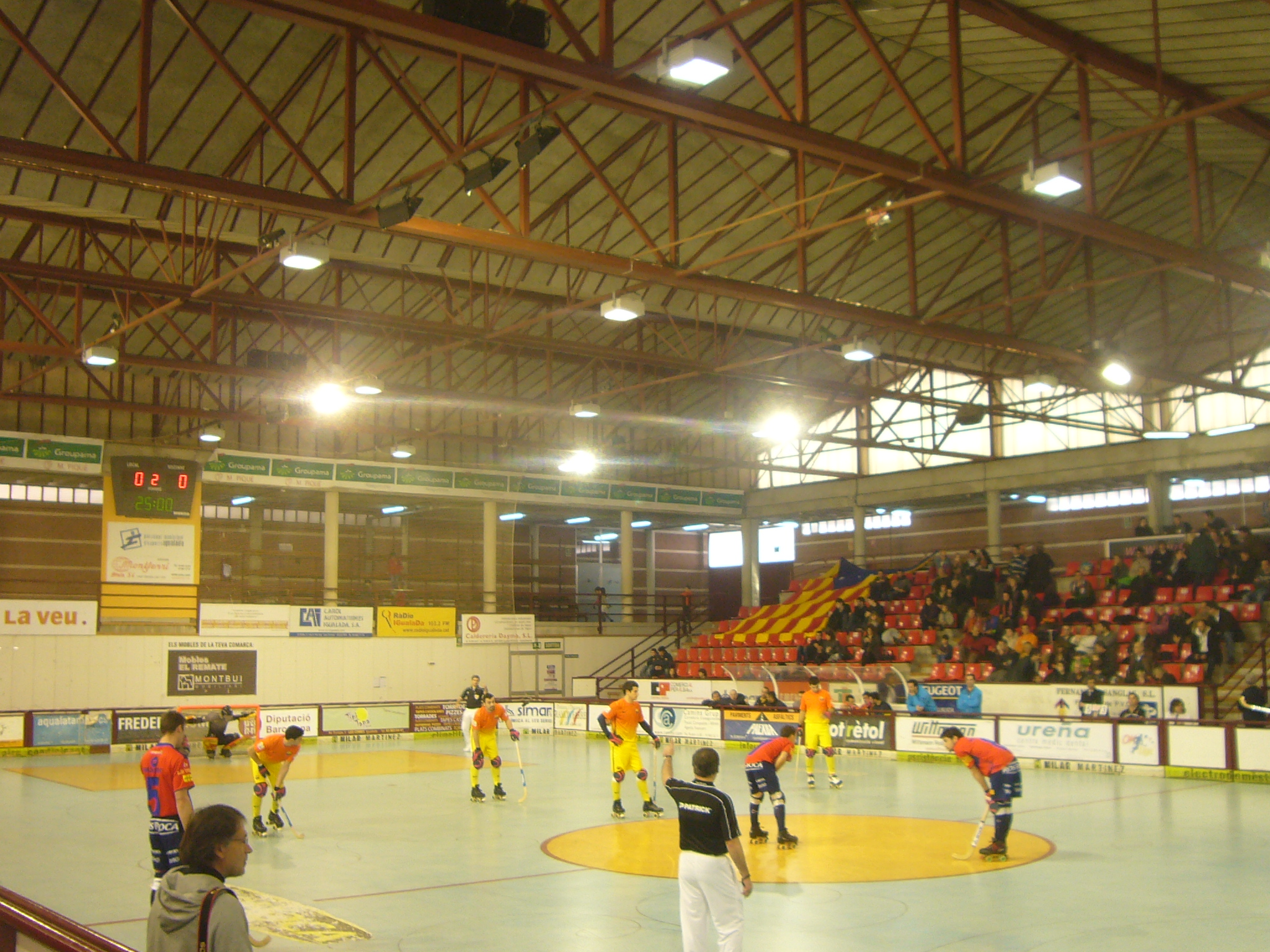
Igualada HC European League game against FC Barcelona Hoquei in Les Comes

The club was founded in 1950. It played in the top nacional category from 1955 to 1964, 1969 to 1973, and from 1984 to nowadays. The team enjoyed its golden era through the 1990s, winning six European Leagues, five European Supercups, five Spanish championships and four national cups between 1989 and 1999. CN Igualada's women's rink hockey team, which would become Igualada HC's women's section in 2008, also won seven Spanish championships between 1993 and 2000. This women's club would split from Igualada HC in 2013 for creating a new Igualada Femení CHP.

== Season by season ==
Season	Tier	Division	Pos.	Copa del Rey	Supercopa	Europe	
2001–02	1	OK Liga	2nd	Runner-up	—N/a	2 CERS Cup	PR
2002–03	1	OK Liga	5th	Semifinalist	—N/a	1 European League	RU
2003–04	1	OK Liga	2nd	Runner-up	—N/a	2 CERS Cup	SF
2004–05	1	OK Liga	5th	Quarterfinalist		1 European League	GS
2005–06	1	OK Liga	4th	Semifinalist		2 CERS Cup	SF
2006–07	1	OK Liga	7th			2 CERS Cup	QF
2007–08	1	OK Liga	8th	Quarterfinalist		1 European League	GS
2008–09	1	OK Liga	6th	Quarterfinalist		1 European League	GS
2009–10	1	OK Liga	10th			2 CERS Cup	SF
2010–11	1	OK Liga	6th			2 CERS Cup	R16
2011–12	1	OK Liga	4th			2 CERS Cup	QF
2012–13	1	OK Liga	9th			1 European League	QF
2013–14	1	OK Liga	7th			2 CERS Cup	SF
2014–15	1	OK Liga	10th	Semifinalist		2 CERS Cup	SF
2015–16	1	OK Liga	8th	Quarterfinalist			
2016–17	1	OK Liga	7th			2 CERS Cup	QF
2017–18	1	OK Liga	6th	Semifinalist		2 CERS Cup	R16
2018–19	1	OK Liga	5th	Quarterfinalist		2 WS Europe Cup	QF
2019–20	1	OK Liga			Semifinalist	2 WS Europe Cup	

== Titles ==
- OK Liga: 6
  - 1988–89, 1991–92, 1993–94, 1994–95, 1996–97, 2025-26
- Copa del Rey: 2
  - 1991–92, 1992–93
- Supercopa de España: 1
  - 1993–94
- European Cup/Champions League: 6
  - 1992–93, 1993–94, 1994–95, 1995–96, 1997–98, 1998–99
- World Skate Europe Cup: 2
  - 2023-24, 2024–25
- Continental Cup: 5
  - 1993, 1994, 1995, 1998, 1999
- Catalan leagues: 4
  - 1991–92, 1992–93, 1993–94, 1998-99
