= CE Noia =

Professional roller hockey team based in Sant Sadurní d'Anoia, Catalonia

Noia Freixenet
- Full name: Club Esportiu Noia
- League: OK Liga
- Founded: 1951
- Home ground: Pavelló Olímpic, Sant Sadurní d'Anoia, Catalonia, Spain (Capacity 1,200)

Personnel
- Chairman: Ferran Andreu
- Manager: Pere Varias
Home	Away

Club Esportiu Noia, also known as CE Noia Freixenet for sponsorship reasons, is a professional roller hockey team based in Sant Sadurní d'Anoia, Catalonia. Nowadays, they play in the OK Liga, the most important division in Spain.

== History ==
CE Noia was founded in 1951 as Sección Deportiva Noia and changed its name first in 1959 to Ateneo Agrario de Noia and finally in 1992 to its current denomination as Club Esportiu Noia.

The club won the Spanish championship in 1988, and the following year it won the European Cup and the Continental Cup. In 1998, the team won the CERS Cup and the Copa del Rey. In 2008, it won its second national cup, and in 2014, it won its second CERS Cup

== Season to season ==
Season	Tier	Division	Pos.	Copa del Rey	Supercopa	Europe	
2001–02	1	OK Liga	6th	Quarterfinalist	—N/a	2 CERS Cup	SF
2002–03	1	OK Liga	2nd		—N/a	2 CERS Cup	SF
2003–04	1	OK Liga	5th	Quarterfinalist	—N/a	1 European League	R1
2004–05	1	OK Liga	3rd	Semifinalist		2 CERS Cup	SF
2005–06	1	OK Liga	7th			1 European League	4th
2006–07	1	OK Liga	4th	Semifinalist			
2007–08	1	OK Liga	4th	Champion		1 European League	GS
2008–09	1	OK Liga	5th	Quarterfinalist	Runner-up	1 European League	QF
2009–10	1	OK Liga	7th	Quarterfinalist		1 European League	L6
2010–11	1	OK Liga	4th	Quarterfinalist		1 European League	QF
2011–12	1	OK Liga	3rd	Runner-up		1 European League	GS
2012–13	1	OK Liga	6th		Runner-up	1 European League	QF
2013–14	1	OK Liga	6th			2 CERS Cup	C
2014–15	1	OK Liga	13th			2 CERS Cup	PR
2015–16	1	OK Liga	9th	Semifinalist			
2016–17	1	OK Liga	8th			2 CERS Cup	PR
2017–18	1	OK Liga	4th	Quarterfinalist		2 CERS Cup	R16
2018–19	1	OK Liga	4th	Quarterfinalist	Semifinalist	1 European League	

== Trophies ==
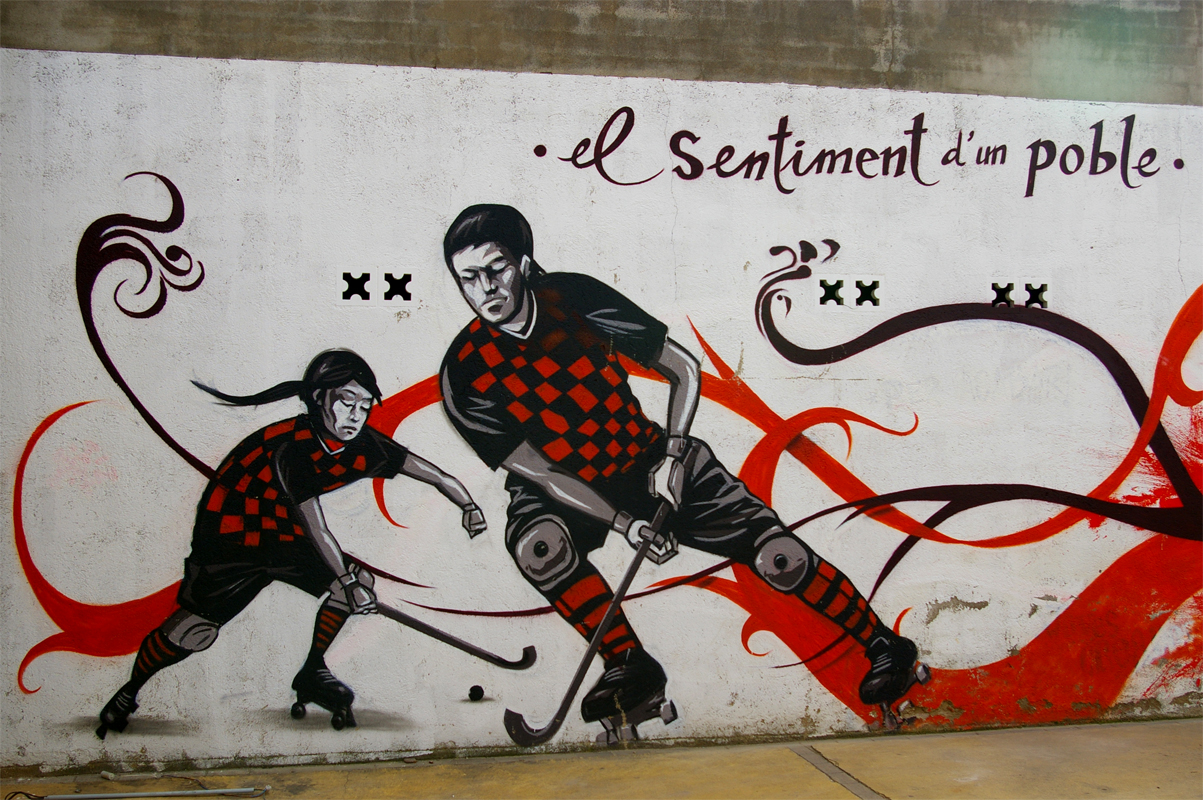
CE Noia Graffiti

- OK Liga: 1
  - 1987–88
- Copa del Rey: 2
  - 1998, 2008
- European League: 1
  - 1988–89
- CERH Cup Winners' Cup: 1
  - 1987-88
- Continental Cup: 2
  - 1988–89, 2014–15
- CERS Cup: 2
  - 1997–98, 2013–14
- Catalan League: 2
  - 1989–90, 2023–24
- Federation Cup: 1
  - 2001–02
