= WSE Cup =

European club roller hockey competition

- Current season, competition or edition: 2025–26 World Skate Europe Cup
- Sport: Roller hockey
- Founded: 1980; 46 years ago (rebranded in 2022)
- Organising body: World Skate Europe - Rink Hockey
- No. of teams: 28 (since 2022–23)
- Most recent champion: (Spain) Pons Lleida (4th title)
- Most titles: (Spain) Pons Lleida (4 titles)
- Related competitions: WSE Champions League (1st tier); WSE Continental Cup
- Website: WSE Cup

The WSE Cup is an annual European club roller hockey competition organised by the World Skate Europe - Rink Hockey since 1980. It is the second most important club competition and features teams who did not qualify for the top-tier WSE Champions League. The winners of the WSE Cup earn the right to play the WSE Continental Cup against the winners of the WSE Champions League.

== Format ==
The World Skate Europe Cup is a two-legged knockout competition between the 16 clubs qualified. To determine these 16 teams, a preliminary round is played. The last four teams advance to a final-four playoff, organized by one of the four contestant clubs.

== Finals ==
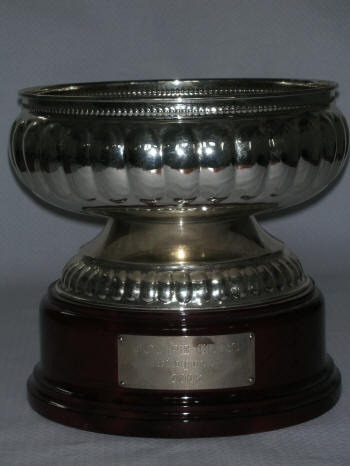
Trophy given to the winners

Season	Winners	Score	Runners-up	Location (final-four)
1980–81	(Portugal) GD Sesimbra	4–1, 2–0	(Netherlands) RC Lichtstad	Two-legged finals
1981–82	(Spain) HC Liceo	12–4, 8–6	(Italy) HC Monza	Two-legged finals
1982–83	(Italy) Amatori Vercelli	6–4, 7–2	(Italy) AFP Giovinazzo	Two-legged finals
1983–84	(Portugal) Sporting CP	1–4, 11–3	(Italy) Hockey Novara	Two-legged finals
1984–85	(Italy) Hockey Novara	4–4, 7–4	(Spain) Cerdanyola CH	Two-legged finals
1985–86	(Spain) CP Tordera	6–6, 11–4	(Italy) Hockey Bassano	Two-legged finals
1986–87	(Italy) Amatori Lodi	5–7, 6–3	(Spain) CE Noia	Two-legged finals
1987–88	(Italy) Amatori Vercelli	3–4, 4–1	(Portugal) CD Paço d'Arcos	Two-legged finals
1988–89	(Italy) HC Monza	13–4, 4–5	(Spain) Igualada HC	Two-legged finals
1989–90	(Italy) Hockey Seregno	3–3, 7–6	(Spain) FC Barcelona	Two-legged finals
1990–91	(Portugal) Benfica	4–6, 10–3	(Spain) Reus Deportiu	Two-legged finals
1991–92	(Italy) Hockey Novara	2–4, 4–1	(Spain) Igualada HC	Two-legged finals
1992–93	(Italy) Hockey Novara	8–2, 6–3	(Italy) Hockey Thiene	Two-legged finals
1993–94	(Portugal) Porto	2–5, 7–1	(Spain) CP Vic	Two-legged finals
1994–95	(Portugal) OC Barcelos	4–6, 6–0	(Spain) CP Tordera	Two-legged finals
1995–96	(Portugal) Porto	3–0, 7–1	(Spain) CP Tordera	Two-legged finals
1996–97	(Portugal) UD Oliveirense	3–2, 5–3	(Portugal) ACR Gulpilhares	Two-legged finals
1997–98	(Spain) CE Noia	5–2, 2–4	(Portugal) CD Paço d'Arcos	Two-legged finals
1998–99	(Spain) HC Liceo	4–7, 5–0	(Portugal) OC Barcelos	Two-legged finals
1999–00	(Portugal) CD Paço d'Arcos	8–2, 3–2	(Spain) CP Voltregà	Two-legged finals
2000–01	(Spain) CP Vic	4–4, 5–3	(Spain) CE Noia	Two-legged finals
2001–02	(Spain) CP Voltregà	3–5, 5–2	(Portugal) Porto	Two-legged finals
2002–03	(Spain) Reus Deportiu	2–3, 5–0	(Spain) CE Lleida	Two-legged finals
2003–04	(Spain) Reus Deportiu	4–0, 0–1	(Italy) Hockey Bassano	Two-legged finals
2004–05	(Italy) Follonica Hockey	4–0, 4–4	(Italy) Hockey Bassano	Two-legged finals
2005–06	(Spain) FC Barcelona	3–1, 2–0	(Spain) CP Vilanova	Two-legged finals
2006–07	(Spain) CP Vilanova	1–1, 4–2	(Portugal) Candelária SC	Two-legged finals
2007–08	(Spain) CP Tenerife	4–4 (2–1 p.)	(Italy) Hockey Valdagno	(France) Dinan
2008–09	(Spain) CH Mataró	2–1 (a.e.t.)	(Spain) CH Lloret	(Spain) Lloret de Mar
2009–10	(Spain) HC Liceo	7–2	(Spain) Blanes HCF	(Portugal) Torres Novas
2010–11	(Portugal) Benfica	6–4	(Spain) CP Vilanova	(Spain) Vilanova i la Geltrú
2011–12	(Italy) Hockey Bassano	2–2 (3–1 p.)	(Portugal) HC Braga	(Italy) Bassano del Grappa
2012–13	(Spain) CE Vendrell	3–2 (a.e.t.)	(Spain) CP Vic	(Spain) El Vendrell
2013–14	(Spain) CE Noia	4–3	(Italy) Hockey Breganze	(Italy) Forte dei Marmi
2014–15	(Portugal) Sporting CP	2–2 (2–1 p.)	(Spain) Reus Deportiu	(Spain) Igualada
2015–16	(Portugal) OC Barcelos	6–3	(Spain) CP Vilafranca	(Portugal) Barcelos
2016–17	(Portugal) OC Barcelos	4–2	(Italy) CGC Viareggio	(Italy) Viareggio
2017–18	(Spain) CE Lleida	2–2 (1–0 p.)	(Portugal) OC Barcelos	(Spain) Lleida
2018–19	(Spain) CE Lleida	6–3	(Italy) Hockey Sarzana	(Spain) Lleida
2019–20	Abandoned (due to the COVID-19 pandemic in Europe).			
2020–21	(Spain) CE Lleida	5–3	(Italy) Hockey Sarzana	Andorra la Vella
2021–22	(Spain) CP Calafell	6–5	(Italy) Follonica Hockey	(Portugal) Paredes
2022–23	(Spain) CP Voltregà	5–4	(Portugal) HC Braga	(Spain) Lleida
2023–24	(Spain) Igualada HC	4–2	(Italy) Follonica Hockey	(Spain) Igualada
2024–25	(Spain) Igualada HC	2–0	(Portugal) SC Tomar	(Spain) Igualada
2025–26	(Spain) Pons Lleida	2–1	(Spain) CP Calafell	(Spain) Lleida

== Performances ==
=== By club ===
Club	Won	Runners-up	Years won	Years runners-up
(Spain) CE Lleida	4	1	2018, 2019, 2021, 2026	2003
(Portugal) OC Barcelos	3	2	1995, 2016, 2017	1999, 2018
(Italy) Hockey Novara	3	1	1985, 1992, 1993	1984
(Spain) HC Liceo	3	0	1982, 1999, 2010	—
(Spain) CE Noia	2	2	1998, 2014	1987, 2001
(Spain) Reus Deportiu	2	2	2003, 2004	1991, 2015
(Spain) Igualada HC	2	2	2024, 2025	1988, 1992
(Portugal) Porto	2	1	1994, 1996	2002
(Spain) CP Voltregà	2	1	2002, 2023	2000
(Italy) Amatori Vercelli	2	0	1983, 1988	—
(Portugal) Benfica	2	0	1991, 2011	—
(Portugal) Sporting CP	2	0	1984, 2015	—
(Italy) Hockey Bassano	1	3	2012	1986, 2004, 2005
(Spain) CP Tordera	1	2	1986	1995, 1996
(Portugal) CD Paço d'Arcos	1	2	2000	1988, 1998
(Spain) CP Vilanova	1	2	2007	2006, 2011
(Spain) CP Vic	1	2	2001	1994, 2013
(Italy) Follonica Hockey	1	2	2005	2022, 2024
(Italy) HC Monza	1	1	1989	1982
(Spain) FC Barcelona	1	1	2006	1990
(Spain) CP Calafell	1	1	2022	2026
(Portugal) GD Sesimbra	1	0	1981	—
(Italy) Amatori Lodi	1	0	1987	—
(Italy) Hockey Seregno	1	0	1990	—
(Portugal) UD Oliveirense	1	0	1997	—
(Spain) CP Tenerife	1	0	2008	—
(Spain) CH Mataró	1	0	2009	—
(Spain) CE Vendrell	1	0	2013	—
(Italy) Hockey Sarzana	0	2	—	2019, 2021
(Portugal) HC Braga	0	2	—	2012, 2023
(Netherlands) RC Lichtstad	0	1	—	1981
(Italy) AFP Giovinazzo	0	1	—	1983
(Spain) Cerdanyola CH	0	1	—	1985
(Italy) Hockey Thiene	0	1	—	1993
(Portugal) ACR Gulpilhares	0	1	—	1997
(Portugal) Candelária SC	0	1	—	2007
(Italy) Hockey Valdagno	0	1	—	2008
(Spain) CH Lloret	0	1	—	2009
(Spain) Blanes HCF	0	1	—	2010
(Italy) Hockey Breganze	0	1	—	2014
(Spain) CP Vilafranca	0	1	—	2016
(Italy) CGC Viareggio	0	1	—	2017
(Portugal) SC Tomar	0	1	—	2025

=== By country ===
Country	Winners	Runners-up	Winners	Runners-up
Spain	23	20	HC Liceo (4), CE Lleida (3), CE Noia (2), Reus Deportiu (2), CP Voltregà (2), Igualada HC (2), CP Tordera (1), CP Vic (1), FC Barcelona (1), CP Vilanova (1), CP Tenerife (1), CH Mataró (1), CE Vendrell (1), CP Calafell (1)	CE Noia (2), Igualada HC (2), CP Vic (2), CP Tordera (2), CP Vilanova (2), Reus Deportiu (2), Cerdanyola CH (1), FC Barcelona (1), CP Voltregà (1), CE Lleida (1), CH Lloret (1), Blanes HCF (1), CP Vilafranca (1), CP Calafell (1)
Portugal	12	10	OC Barcelos (3), Benfica (2), Porto (2), Sporting CP (2), GD Sesimbra (1), UD Oliveirense (1), CD Paço d'Arcos (1)	CD Paço d'Arcos (2), OC Barcelos (2), HC Braga (2), ACR Gulpilhares (1), Porto (1), Candelária SC (1), SC Tomar (1)
Italy	10	14	Hockey Novara (3), Amatori Vercelli (2), Amatori Lodi (1), HC Monza (1), Hockey Seregno (1), Follonica Hockey (1), Hockey Bassano (1)	Hockey Bassano (3), Hockey Sarzana (2), HC Monza (1), AFP Giovinazzo (1), Hockey Novara (1), Hockey Thiene (1), Hockey Valdagno (1), Hockey Breganze (1), CGC Viareggio (1), Follonica Hockey (2)
Netherlands	0	1	—	RC Lichtstad (1)
