= OK Liga =

Spanish men's rink hockey league

- Current season, competition or edition: 2026–27 OK Liga
- Sport: Roller hockey
- Founded: 1969; 57 years ago
- No. of teams: 16
- Country: Spain
- Confederation: WSE
- Most recent champions: Igualada (6th title) (2025–26)
- Most titles: Barcelona (35 titles)
- Broadcasters: Esport3 / Teledeporte; Barça TV
- Relegation to: OK Liga Plata
- International cups: European League; WS Europe Cup
- Website: hockeypatines.fep.es

The OK Liga is the Spanish rink hockey league.

== History ==
The league was founded in 1969 as División de Honor as an expansion to all the Spanish territory of the Catalan Championship. Until 1971 teams from outside Catalonia did not join the competition.

The league changed its name to OK Liga in 2003 and in 2009 the playoffs for the title, that were established in the 2000–01 season, were abolished while several rules from other sports were approved.

In April 2017, a new name change for the 2017–18 season was approved and the top tier would be renamed as the OK Liga Oro while the second tier as OK Liga Plata. Also, a new national third tier competition OK Liga Bronce (with four interregional groups) was foreseen, but due to the lack of interested teams, it wasn't created and the third tier remained at regional level.

All titles were won by Catalan teams except the editions achieved by Liceo. Barcelona is the most successful team.

== Competition format ==
The championship is played through 30 matchdays in a round-robin format, a format quite common in other sports, such as football. The top team when finished to play the 30 matchdays is the champion.

Conversely, the last team qualified is relegated to Primera División.

Points are awarded as follows:

- 3 points for the winner team
- 1 point if a draw for each team
- 0 points for loser team

== Champions by year ==
=== División de Honor ===
Year	Champion	Runner-up
1969–70	Reus Deportiu	Noia
1970–71	Reus Deportiu	Noia
1971–72	Reus Deportiu	Barcelona
1972–73	Reus Deportiu	Sentmenat
1973–74	Barcelona	Voltregà
1974–75	Voltregà	Barcelona
1975–76	Voltregà	Vilanova
1976–77	Barcelona	Reus Deportiu
1977–78	Barcelona	Voltregà
1978–79	Barcelona	Reus Deportiu
1979–80	Barcelona	Tordera
1980–81	Barcelona	Noia
1981–82	Barcelona	Liceo
1982–83	Liceo	Barcelona
1983–84	Barcelona	Tordera
1984–85	Barcelona	Liceo
1985–86	Liceo	Barcelona

Year	Champion	Runner-up
1986–87	Liceo	Barcelona
1987–88	Noia	Liceo
1988–89	Igualada	Liceo
1989–90	Liceo	Igualada
1990–91	Liceo	Igualada
1991–92	Igualada	Liceo
1992–93	Liceo	Igualada
1993–94	Igualada	Barcelona
1994–95	Igualada	Barcelona
1995–96	Barcelona	Liceo
1996–97	Igualada	Barcelona
1997–98	Barcelona	Vic
1998–99	Barcelona	Liceo
1999–00	Barcelona	Liceo
2000–01	Barcelona	Vic
2001–02	Barcelona	Igualada

=== OK Liga ===
Year	Champion	Runner-up
2002–03	Barcelona	Noia
2003–04	Barcelona	Igualada
2004–05	Barcelona	Reus Deportiu
2005–06	Barcelona	Reus Deportiu
2006–07	Barcelona	Reus Deportiu
2007–08	Barcelona	Reus Deportiu
2008–09	Barcelona	Liceo
2009–10	Barcelona	Liceo
2010–11	Reus Deportiu	Liceo
2011–12	Barcelona	Liceo
2012–13	Liceo	Barcelona
2013–14	Barcelona	Liceo
2014–15	Barcelona	Liceo
2015–16	Barcelona	Vic
2016–17	Barcelona	Reus Deportiu
2017–18	Barcelona	Liceo
2018–19	Barcelona	Liceo
2019–20	Barcelona	Liceo
2020–21	Barcelona	Liceo
2021–22	Liceo	Reus Deportiu
2022–23	Barcelona	Liceo
2023–24	Barcelona	Noia
2024–25	Barcelona	Liceo
2025–26	Igualada	Liceo

=== Performance by club ===
Club	Titles	Runners-up	Years winners
Barcelona	35	9	1974, 1977, 1978, 1979, 1980, 1981, 1982, 1984, 1985, 1996, 1998, 1999, 2000, 2001, 2002, 2003, 2004, 2005, 2006, 2007, 2008, 2009, 2010, 2012, 2014, 2015, 2016, 2017, 2018, 2019, 2020, 2021, 2023, 2024, 2025
Liceo	8	21	1983, 1986, 1987, 1990, 1991, 1993, 2013, 2022
Igualada	6	5	1989, 1992, 1994, 1995, 1997, 2026
Reus Deportiu	5	8	1970, 1971, 1972, 1973, 2011
Voltregà	2	2	1975, 1976
Noia	1	5	1988
Vic	0	3	
Tordera	0	2	
Sentmenat	0	1	
Vilanova	0	1	

=== Champions by Autonomous Communities ===
Titles	Autonomous Community
49	Catalonia
8	(Galicia (Spain)) Galicia
57	TOTAL

== See also ==
- Copa del Rey de Hockey Patines
- Supercopa de España de Hockey Patines
- OK Liga Femenina
