= HC Liceo =

Liceo
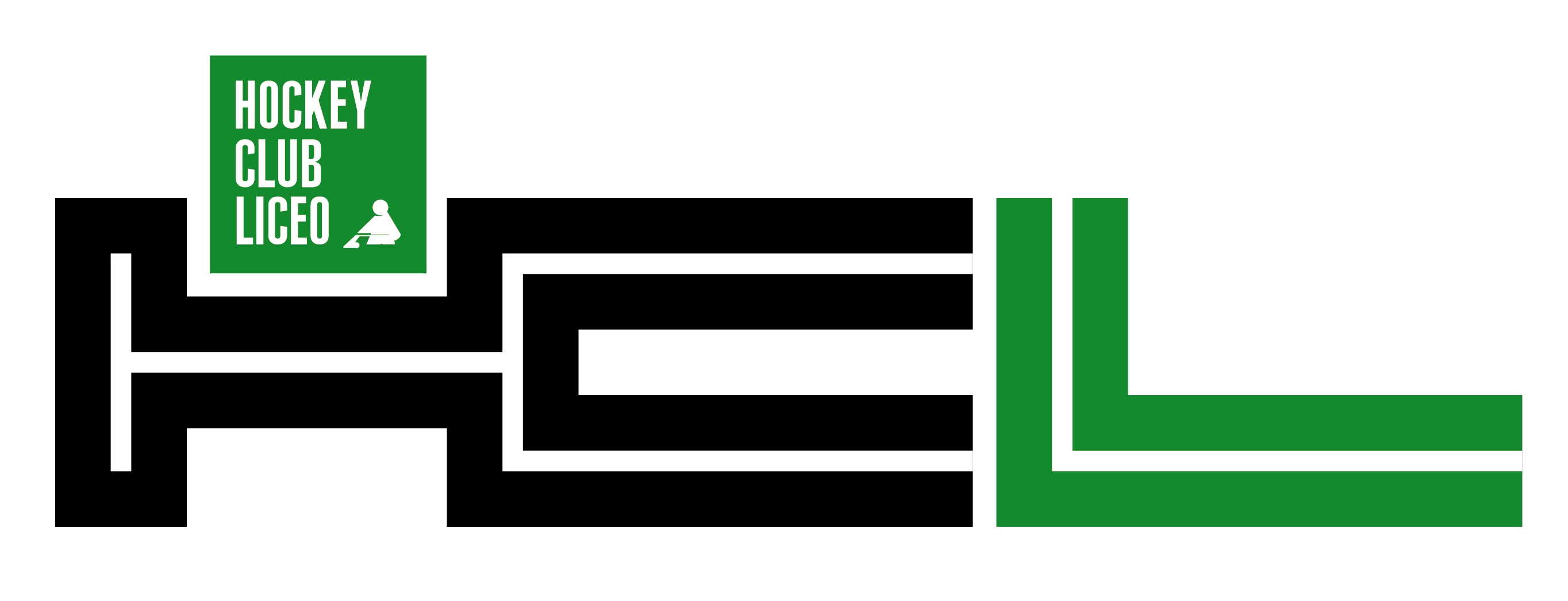
- Full name: Hockey Club Liceo de La Coruña
- League: OK Liga
- Founded: 1972
- Home ground: Pazo dos Deportes de Riazor, A Coruña, Galicia, Spain (Capacity 5,000)

Personnel
- Chairman: (Spain) Eduardo Lamas
- Manager: (Argentina) Carlos Gil
Home	Away

Hockey Club Liceo (also known as Deportivo Liceo for sponsorship reasons) is a Spanish rink hockey club based in A Coruña, Spain.

Founded in 1972, Liceo is the only team from outside Catalonia to have won the Spanish league.

== History ==
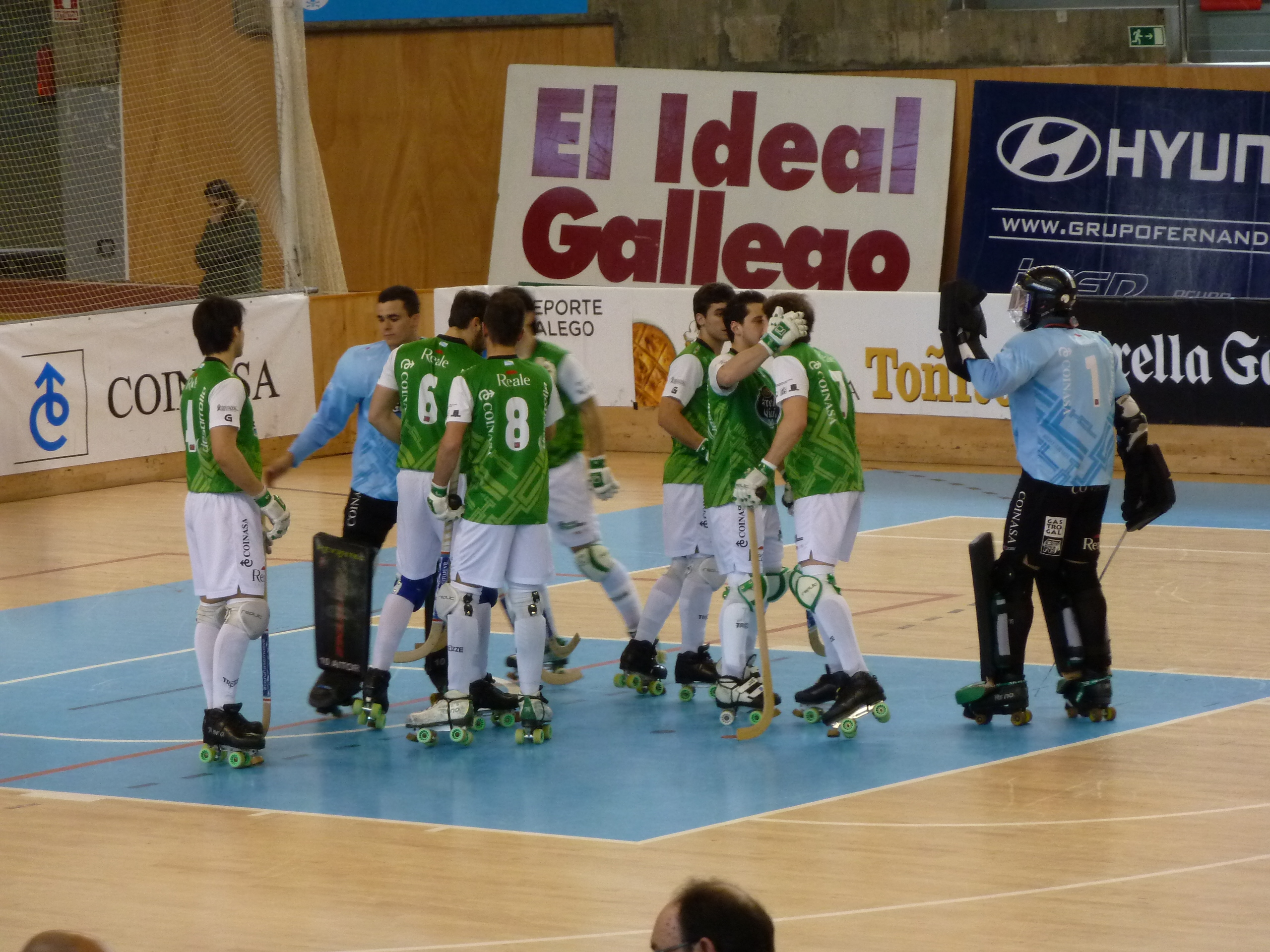
Liceo players, before an OK Liga match.

Founded in 1972 at the school Liceo La Paz, the club achieved the promotion to the first division in only seven years. In the 1980–81 season, only their second at the top tier, the club ended in the third position and secured the qualification to the World Skate Europe Cup.

The 1980s became the golden years of the club. They started in 1982 with the title of the World Skate Europe Cup in their European debut and continued with the first Copa del Rey.

In 1983 Liceo won their first League and later, the club would win two consecutive European Cups in 1987 and 1988. The golden years of the club ended in the 1990s with six national leagues, eight cups and three European Cups.

At the end of the 1990s the club starts a decline of results, winning no titles for several years until the European League of 2003. Years later, the club grew again until it returned to the European elite by winning the European Leagues of 2011 and 2012 and, later, the 2012–13 OK Liga.

In 2016, the women's team would make their debut in the OK Liga Femenina. Liceo promoted also in 2014, but in that time, refused to play in the Spanish women's roller hockey first division.

In 2016 and 2018 the men's team enlarged their list of trophies by winning the Spanish SuperCup.

== Season to season ==
=== Men's team ===
Season	Tier	Division	Pos.	Copa del Rey	Supercopa	Europe	
2001–02	1	OK Liga	3rd	Quarterfinalist	—N/a		
2002–03	1	OK Liga	10th	Quarterfinalist	—N/a	1 European League	C
2003–04	1	OK Liga	4th	Champion	—N/a	1 European League	GS
2004–05	1	OK Liga	8th		Runner-up	2 CERS Cup	R16
2005–06	1	OK Liga	9th				
2006–07	1	OK Liga	3rd	Semifinalist			
2007–08	1	OK Liga	3rd	Semifinalist		1 European League	SF
2008–09	1	OK Liga	2nd	Semifinalist		1 European League	SF
2009–10	1	OK Liga	2nd	Semifinalist		2 CERS Cup	C
2010–11	1	OK Liga	2nd	Semifinalist		1 European League	C
2011–12	1	OK Liga	2nd	Semifinalist		1 European League	C
2012–13	1	OK Liga	1st	Semifinalist		1 European League	QF
2013–14	1	OK Liga	2nd	Quarterfinalist	Semifinalist	1 European League	QF
2014–15	1	OK Liga	2nd	Semifinalist	Runner-up	1 European League	QF
2015–16	1	OK Liga	3rd	Semifinalist	Runner-up	1 European League	QF
2016–17	1	OK Liga	3rd	Semifinalist	Champion	1 European League	QF
2017–18	1	OK Liga	2nd	Runner-up	Semifinalist	1 European League	QF
2018–19	1	OK Liga	2nd	Runner-up	Champion	1 European League	GS
2019–20	1	OK Liga			Semifinalist	1 European League	

=== Women's team ===
Season	Tier	Division	Pos.	Copa de la Reina
2014–15	2	Autonómica	2nd	
2015–16	2	Autonómica	1st	
2016–17	1	OK Liga	10th	Quarterfinalist
2017–18	1	OK Liga	12th (Note: Remained in the league as the reserve team promoted.)	
2018–19	1	OK Liga	14th	

== Trophies ==
- OK Liga: 8
  - 1982–83, 1985–86, 1986–87, 1989–90, 1990–91, 1992–93, 2012–13, 2021–22
- Copa del Rey: 11
  - 1982, 1984, 1988, 1989, 1991, 1995, 1996, 1997, 2004, 2021, 2026
- Supercopa de España: 3
  - 2016, 2018, 2021
- European League: 6
  - 1987, 1988, 1992, 2003, 2011, 2012
- World Skate Europe Cup: 3
  - 1982, 1999, 2010
- Cup Winners Cup: 2
  - 1990, 1996
- Continental Cup: 6
  - 1987, 1988, 1989, 1992, 2003, 2012
- Intercontinental Cup: 5
  - 1987, 1989, 1993, 2004, 2012
- Ciudad de Vigo Tournament: 3
  - 2002, 2005, 2006

== Notable players ==
- Alberto Areces
- Carlos Gil
- Cristiano Pereira
- Daniel Martinazzo
- Facundo Salinas
- Jaume Llaverola
- Jordi Bargalló
- Mario Agüero
- Mario Rubio
- Martín Payero
- Pablo Álvarez
- Ramón Canalda
- Reinaldo García
- Ricardo Barreiros
- Rui Lopes
- Willy Duarte
