= HC Braga =

Hóquei Clube de Braga / SPORMEX
- Full name: HC Braga
- Nickname(s): Bracarenses
- League: 1ª Divisão
- Founded: March 18, 1988; 38 years ago
- Home ground: Pavilhão das Goladas, Braga (Capacity 500)

Personnel
- Chairman: (Portugal) Luís Botelho
- Manager: (Portugal) André Torres
- Website: facebook.com/HCBraga
Home	Away

Hóquei Clube de Braga/ SPORMEX (sponsored by events company SPORMEX) is a professional roller hockey club from Braga, Portugal. It was founded on 18 March 1988, after the extinction of the rink hockey squad of ABC Braga, a local handball club. It has about 400 members. The senior team participates in the Portuguese Roller Hockey First Division and in last years qualified to CERS Cup. The club has youth teams with several regional, national and European titles.

== 2013-14 Technical Team ==
Technical Team
	Name	Post
(Portugal)	Vítor Silva	Head coach
(Portugal)	Miguel Soares	Assistant Coach and Fitness Coach
(Portugal)	Jorge Mendes	Mechanic
(Portugal)	André Carneiro	Youth Coordinator

== 2013-14 Squad ==
Note: Flags indicate national team as defined under FIFA eligibility rules; some limited exceptions apply. Players may hold more than one non-FIFA nationality.

No.	Pos.	Nation	Player
1	GK	POR	Rodolfo Sobral
2	DF	POR	Luís Filipe
3	MF	POR	Eduardo Brás
4	FW	POR	Miguel Vieira
5	FW	POR	Rodrigo Sousa
6	FW	POR	Frederico Saraiva "Fred"
8	MF	POR	José Campos "Ziga"

No.	Pos.	Nation	Player
9	MF	POR	Ricardo Ramos "Piolho"
23	GK	POR	Guilherme Silva
55	MF	POR	César Carvalho "Chumbinho"
—	FW	POR	Gabi Silva (junior)
—	FW	POR	Miguel Castro (junior)
—	FW	POR	Sérgio Campos (junior)
—	FW	POR	Luís Lima (junior)

== Titles ==
=== Senior team ===
- Seniors Premiere - 2001/02;
- 2nd National Division Champion (2004/05 and 2006/07);
- Portuguese Roller Hockey First Division debut - 2005/06;
- Portuguese Roller Hockey First Division

8 Appearances (2005/06 and from 2007/08 until 2013/14);
Best rank: 5th place in 2010/11

- Portuguese Cup runner-up (2006/07 and 2007/08);
- Portuguese Supercup runner-up in 2008/09);
- 6 attendances in CERS Cup - from 2008/2009 until 2013/2014 (Best rank: runner-up in 2011/12);

=== Youth Teams ===
U-15: National Champions in 2010/11
U-17: European and National Champions in 2013/14 and runner-up in 2010/11 and 2012/13
U-20: National championship runner-up in 2013/14

HC Braga won several Regional Championships and Regional Cups in all levels.

=== Players at Portugal national roller hockey team ===
In 2010/2011, some HC Braga athletes Braga have been elected to play at National teams like Helder Nunes, who was selected to compete in the 2011 CIRH U-20 World Cup, where the Portuguese finished in 2nd place. In 2012, Helder Nunes was summoned to the Senior National Team, participating in the 2012 CERH European Championship in Lordelo (Paredes Municipality), Portugal. Another HC Braga athlete elected to the Portugal national team, was Miguel Vieira (U-15 National Champion in 2010/2011), playing in the 2012 European Roller Hockey Juvenile Championship (U-17), where the Portuguese team finished in 2nd place. In 2013, Carlos Loureiro was crowned U-17 European Champion while Miguel Vieira won th 2013 FIRS Roller Hockey World Cup U-20.
