= Hockey Breganze =

Italian roller hockey team

- Full name: Associazione Sportiva Dilettantistica Hockey Breganze
- League: Serie A2
- Founded: 1961
- Home ground: PalaFerrarin, Breganze, Italy (Capacity 1,500)
| Home | Away |

Associazione Sportiva Dilettantistica Hockey Breganze is a roller hockey team from Breganze, Italy.

== History ==
Hockey Breganze was founded in 1961 with the name of Polisportiva CSI Breganze. The golden years of the club were in the 1970s, when it won the two Italian leagues that currently owns.

In the 2000s, Breganze consolidated as one of the top Italian clubs and uses to play European competitions.

== Honours ==
- Italian Championship: 2
  - 1975–76, 1978–79
- Coppa Italia: 4
  - 1968, 1975, 2015, 2019
- Italian Supercup: 1
  - 2016
