= Follonica Hockey =

- Full name: Follonica Hockey
- League: Serie A1
- Founded: 1952
- Home ground: Palasport Armeni, "Capannino", Follonica, Italy (Capacity 3,500)
Home	Away

Follonica Hockey or Associazione Sportiva Dilettantistica Follonica Hockey is a roller hockey team from Follonica, Italy. It was established in 1952.

== History ==
Merged in 1962 with another team belonging to the same town, Follonica Hockey made their debut in the Serie A italian championship in 1962. After alternating during several seasons the first and second tiers, in the 1970s the club consolidates in the top league and wins their first national cup in 1977 and five years later the second one.

In 2005, Follonica wins their first continental title by winning the 2004–05 CERS Cup and weeks later, they would achieve the first of their four consecutive Italian leagues.

One year later, Follonica became the first Italian team to win the CERH European League, the top European club competition.

== Honours ==
=== National ===
- Serie A1 italian championship: 4
  - 2005, 2006, 2007, 2008
- Coppa Italia: 9
  - 1977, 1982, 2005, 2006, 2007, 2008, 2009, 2010, 2018
- Coppa di Lega: 1
  - 1985
- Supercoppa Italiana: 3
  - 2005, 2006, 2008

=== International ===
- Intercontinental Cup: 1
  - 2007
- European League: 1
  - 2006
- CERS Cup: 1
  - 2005
