= C.G.C. Viareggio =

Italian multi-sport team

- Full name: S.C. Centro Giovani Calciatori Viareggio A.S.D.
- League: Lega Nazionale Hockey
- Founded: 20 November 1947
- Home ground: Viareggio, Italy

S.C. Centro Giovani Calciatori Viareggio Associazione Sportiva Dilettantistica, or simply C.G.C. Viareggio, is a multi-sport team from Viareggio, Italy. It was founded on 20 November 1947. The club consists of roller hockey section and football section, etc. It is the organiser of Torneo di Viareggio.

== Honours ==
- Lega Nazionale Hockey: 1
  - 2010–11
- Coppa Italia: 1
  - 2010–11
