= Candelária Sport Clube =

Portuguese rink Hockey team

- Sport: Rink hockey
- Founded: 24 January 1990
- League: Portuguese Roller Hockey First Division
- Arena: Candelária
- Manager: Vitor Silva
- Short name: Candelária SC
- Website: www.csc-candelaria.com

Candelária Sport Clube is a Rink Hockey team from Candelária, Azores, Portugal. It was founded on 24 January 1990 and played the 2011 European League Final Eight for the first time of its history.

== 2010/2011 squad ==
#		Name	Age	Last Club
3	(Portugal)	Tiago Resende	27	CD Paço d'Arcos
5	(Portugal)	André Moreira	27	Porto Santo SAD
6	(Portugal)	Bruno Dutra	29	Armada Verde
7	(Argentina)	Mauro Fernandez	34
8	(Portugal)	Rui Ribeiro	29
9	(Portugal)	João Matos	29	Armada Verde
11	(Portugal)	Milton Jorge	29
18	(Argentina)	Maxi Oliva	29
20	(Portugal)	Edgar Pereira	25
33	(Portugal)	Sérgio Silva	37	Asd Bassano Hockey 54
99	(Portugal)	Paulo Matos (GK)	38
