= RSC Cronenberg =

- Full name: Rollschuh-Club Cronenberg e.V.
- Nickname(s): RSC Cronenberg
- League: Roller Hockey Bundesliga
- Founded: August 1954, 7; 71 years ago
- Home ground: Alfred Henckels Halle, Wuppertal, Germany (Capacity 700)

The Rollschuh-Club Cronenberg e.V. is a roller hockey team from Wuppertal, North Rhine-Westphalia, Germany. It was founded on 7 August 1954. Both the men's and women's team are among the most successful ones in Germany, with the men having won 13 league and 12 cup titles and the women having won 12 league and 11 cup titles as of 2025. The men's team reached rank 2 and the women's team rank 1 in season 2024/25.

In the official World Club Ranking, the men's team are currently 89th and the 2nd best German team.

== Trophies ==
- 13 German Championship
