= Genève RHC =

Swiss hockey team

- Full name: Genève Roller Hockey Club
- League: LNA
- Founded: 1939

Personnel
- Chairman: Piero Tosi
- Manager: Pierluigi Brescani

The Genève Rink Hockey Club is a roller hockey team from Geneva, Switzerland. It was founded in 1939 and won its 11th Swiss title in 2011.

== Trophies ==
- 11 Swiss Championship
