= Hockey Bassano =

- Full name: Hockey Bassano 1954
- League: Serie A1
- Founded: 1954 (re-founded in 2011)
- Home ground: PalaSind, Bassano del Grappa, Italy (Capacity 3,500)
- Website: Official website
Home	Away

Hockey Bassano 1954 is a roller hockey team from Bassano del Grappa, Italy. It was founded in 1954 and later refounded in 2011 due to their financial struggle.

The biggest titles of the clubs are the CERS Cup won in the 2011–12 season and the 2006 Rink hockey World Club Championship.

== Honours ==
=== National ===
- Italian Championship: 2
  - 2003–04, 2008–09
- Coppa Italia: 2
  - 1980–81, 2003–04
- Italian Supercup: 2
  - 2008, 2010

=== International ===
- CERS Cup: 1
  - 2011–12
- World Club Championship: 1
  - 2006
