= 2023–24 WSE Champions League =

Tournament details
- City: Final four: Porto, Portugal
- Dates: 13 October 2023 – 12 May 2024
- Teams: Group stage: 16; Total: 30 (from 7 associations)

Final positions
- Champions: Sporting CP (4th title)
- Runners-up: UD Oliveirense

The 2023–24 WSE Champions League is the 59th season of Europe's premier club roller hockey tournament organized by World Skate Europe – Rink Hockey, and the second season under the WSE Champions League branding. Compared to the previous season, the knockout stage quarter-finals will be contested as two-legged fixtures followed by a final-four tournament, scheduled to be played on 11 and 12 May 2024.

FC Porto were the defending champions, having beaten AD Valongo 5–1 in an all-Portuguese 2022–23 final. They were eliminated in the semi-finals by domestic rivals Sporting CP, who went on to beat another Portuguese side in the final (UD Oliveirense, 2–1) and win their fourth title in the competition. This was the second consecutive all-Portuguese final, which was assured after four Portuguese teams – OC Barcelos, UD Oliveirense, FC Porto, and Sporting CP – secured qualification for the final four tournament.

== Team allocation ==
=== Association ranking ===
For the 2023–24 WSE Champions League, the associations were allocated places according to their coefficient, which takes into account the performance of each association's representative teams in European competitions between the 2018–19 and the 2022–23 seasons (except for the 2019–20 season, which was discarded due to being interrupted). The coefficient is calculated by dividing the total of points accumulated by the number of participating teams.

The D'Hondt method was applied to the coefficient of each association to determine the number of teams entering in each round:

1st qualifying round	PRT SC Tomar	ESP Igualada	ESP Lleida	ITA Follonica Hockey
1st qualifying round	ITA Sarzana	ITA Grosseto	ITA Valdagno	FRA CS Noisy
1st qualifying round	FRA US Coutras	FRA La Vendéenne	SWI SC Thunerstern	GER SK Germania Herringen
1st qualifying round	GER ESG Walsum	ENG King's Lynn RHC		
2nd qualifying round	PRT FC Porto	PRT UD Oliveirense	PRT AD Valongo	ESP Reus Deportiu
2nd qualifying round	ESP CE Noia	ESP CF Calafell	ITA Forte dei Marmi	GER RHC Diessbach
Group stage	POR Benfica	POR Sporting	POR Barcelos	ESP Barcelona
Group stage	ESP Liceo Coruña	ITA GSH Trissino	ITA Amatori Lodi	FRA SCRA Saint-Omer

== Schedule ==
Schedule for 2023–24 WSE Champions League
Phase	Round	Draw date	Date
Qualifying rounds	First qualifying round	11 August 2023	13–15 October 2023
Qualifying rounds	Second qualifying round	16 October 2023	17–19 November 2023
Group stage	Matchday 1	6 November 2023	30 November 2023
Group stage	Matchday 2	6 November 2023	14 December 2023
Group stage	Matchday 3	6 November 2023	11 January 2024
Group stage	Matchday 4	6 November 2023	25 January 2024
Group stage	Matchday 5	6 November 2023	8 February 2024
Group stage	Matchday 6	6 November 2023	29 February 2024
Quarter-finals	First leg	No draw (pre-defined)	14 March 2024
Quarter-finals	Second leg	No draw (pre-defined)	11 April 2024
Final four	Semi-finals	No draw (pre-defined)	11 May 2024
Final four	Final	No draw (pre-defined)	12 May 2024

== Qualifying rounds ==
=== First qualifying round ===
==== Group A ====
Follonica flight got cancelled and they failed to attend the competition; they were awarded defeats by 0–10 in both matches.

Pos	Team	Pld	W	D	L	GF	GA	GD	Pts	Qualification	(France) VEN	(Germany) HER	(Italy) FOL
1	(France) La Vendéenne (H)	2	2	0	0	15	0	+15	6	Advance to 2nd qualifying round	—	5–0	10–0
2	(Germany) Germania Herringen	2	1	0	1	10	5	+5	3	Advance to 2nd qualifying round		—	10–0
3	(Italy) Follonica	2	0	0	2	0	20	−20	0	Relegated to WSE Cup			—

Source: World Skate Europe
(H) Hosts

==== Group B ====
Pos	Team	Pld	W	D	L	GF	GA	GD	Pts	Qualification	(Portugal) SCT	(France) CSN	(Italy) GRO	(Germany) WAL
1	(Portugal) SC Tomar	3	3	0	0	20	6	+14	9	Advance to 2nd Qualifying Round	—	4–2	5–4	11–0
2	(France) CS Noisy-le-Grand (H)	3	2	0	1	19	8	+11	6	Advance to 2nd Qualifying Round		—	9–2	8–2
3	(Italy) CP Grosseto	3	1	0	2	13	15	−2	3	Relegated to WSE Cup			—	7–1
4	(Germany) RESG Walsum	3	0	0	3	3	26	−23	0	Relegated to WSE Cup				—

Source: World Skate Europe
(H) Hosts

==== Group C ====
Pos	Team	Pld	W	D	L	GF	GA	GD	Pts	Qualification	(Spain) IGU	(Italy) SAR	(Switzerland) THU	(England) KIN
1	(Spain) Igualada (H)	3	3	0	0	32	8	+24	9	Advance to 2nd Qualifying Round	—	11–7	5–1	16–0
2	(Italy) Sarzana	3	2	0	1	26	13	+13	6	Advance to 2nd Qualifying Round		—	6–0	13–2
3	(Switzerland) Thunerstern	3	1	0	2	7	11	−4	3	Relegated to WSE Cup			—	6–0
4	(England) King's Lynn	3	0	0	3	2	35	−33	0	Relegated to WSE Cup				—

(H) Hosts

==== Group D ====
Pos	Team	Pld	W	D	L	GF	GA	GD	Pts	Qualification	(Spain) LLE	(France) COU	(Italy) VAL
1	(Spain) Lleida	2	2	0	0	8	3	+5	6	Advance to 2nd Qualifying Round	—	2–0	6–3
2	(France) Coutras (H)	2	0	1	1	3	5	−2	1	Advance to 2nd Qualifying Round		—	3–3
3	(Italy) Valdagno	2	0	1	1	6	9	−3	1	Relegated to WSE Cup			—

(H) Hosts

=== Second qualifying round ===
==== Group A ====
Pos	Team	Pld	W	D	L	GF	GA	GD	Pts	Qualification	(Portugal) OLI	(Italy) FOR	(Spain) IGU	(Switzerland) DIE
1	(Portugal) Oliveirense	3	3	0	0	16	3	+13	9	Advance to Group stage	—	3–1	3–1	10–1
2	(Italy) Forte dei Marmi (H)	3	2	0	1	12	4	+8	6	Advance to Group stage		—	3–0	8–1
3	(Spain) Igualada	3	1	0	2	4	7	−3	3	Relegated to WSE Cup			—	3–1
4	(Switzerland) RHC Diessbach	3	0	0	3	3	21	−18	0	Relegated to WSE Cup				—

(H) Hosts

==== Group B ====
Pos	Team	Pld	W	D	L	GF	GA	GD	Pts	Qualification	(Portugal) TOM	(Portugal) VAL	(Spain) NOI	(Germany) GER
1	(Portugal) SC Tomar (H)	3	3	0	0	17	7	+10	9	Advance to Group stage	—	5–4	6–2	6–1
2	(Portugal) Valongo	3	2	0	1	21	11	+10	6	Advance to Group stage		—	6–4	11–2
3	(Spain) Noia	3	1	0	2	14	12	+2	3	Relegated to WSE Cup			—	8–0
4	(Germany) Germania Herringen	3	0	0	3	3	25	−22	0	Relegated to WSE Cup				—

(H) Hosts

==== Group C ====
Pos	Team	Pld	W	D	L	GF	GA	GD	Pts	Qualification	(Portugal) POR	(Spain) LEI	(France) NOI	(France) COU
1	(Portugal) FC Porto	3	2	1	0	22	3	+19	7	Advance to Group stage	—	1–1	9–1	12–1
2	(Spain) Lleida (H)	3	2	1	0	10	3	+7	7	Advance to Group stage		—	4–1	5–1
3	(France) Noisy Le Grand	3	1	0	2	6	15	−9	3	Relegated to WSE Cup			—	4–2
4	(France) Coutras	3	0	0	3	4	21	−17	0	Relegated to WSE Cup				—

(H) Hosts

==== Group D ====
Pos	Team	Pld	W	D	L	GF	GA	GD	Pts	Qualification	(Spain) CAL	(Spain) REU	(France) VEN	(Italy) SAR
1	(Spain) Calafell (H)	3	2	1	0	15	5	+10	7	Advance to Group stage	—	2–2	4–1	9–2
2	(Spain) Reus	3	2	1	0	17	8	+9	7	Advance to Group stage		—	8–3	7–3
3	(France) La Vendéenne	3	0	1	2	9	17	−8	1	Relegated to WSE Cup			—	5–5
4	(Italy) Sarzana	3	0	1	2	10	21	−11	1	Relegated to WSE Cup				—

(H) Hosts

== Group stage ==
=== Group A ===
Pos	Team	Pld	W	D	L	GF	GA	GD	Pts	Qualification	(Spain) FCB	(Portugal) OCB	(Italy) FOR	(Spain) LIC
1	(Spain) FC Barcelona	6	5	1	0	25	7	+18	16	Advance to quarter-finals	—	3–1	6–0	8–2
2	(Portugal) OC Barcelos	6	3	2	1	18	12	+6	11	Advance to quarter-finals	1–1	—	2–1	4–4
3	(Italy) Forte dei Marmi	6	1	1	4	10	22	−12	4		1–3	1–6	—	4–2
4	(Spain) HC Liceo	6	0	2	4	15	27	−12	2		2–4	2–4	3–3	—

Source: World Skate Europe

=== Group B ===
Pos	Team	Pld	W	D	L	GF	GA	GD	Pts	Qualification	(Portugal) BEN	(Portugal) SPO	(Spain) CAL	(Spain) REU
1	(Portugal) SL Benfica	6	5	0	1	25	15	+10	15	Advance to quarter-finals	—	3–1	3–2	4–2
2	(Portugal) Sporting CP	6	3	2	1	20	17	+3	11	Advance to quarter-finals	7–6	—	2–2	3–2
3	(Spain) Calafell	6	1	2	3	14	16	−2	5		0–3	2–2	—	4–1
4	(Spain) Reus Deportiu	6	1	0	5	15	26	−11	3		3–6	2–5	5–4	—

Source: World Skate Europe

=== Group C ===
Pos	Team	Pld	W	D	L	GF	GA	GD	Pts	Qualification	(Portugal) POR	(Italy) TRI	(Portugal) TOM	(Spain) LEI
1	(Portugal) FC Porto	6	5	0	1	28	15	+13	15	Advance to quarter-finals	—	5–4	9–0	4–2
2	(Italy) Trissino	6	2	2	2	26	23	+3	8	Advance to quarter-finals	3–5	—	4–2	8–4
3	(Portugal) SC Tomar	6	2	2	2	14	22	−8	8		5–3	2–2	—	2–1
4	(Spain) Lleida	6	0	2	4	16	24	−8	2		1–2	5–5	3–3	—

Source: World Skate Europe

=== Group D ===
Pos	Team	Pld	W	D	L	GF	GA	GD	Pts	Qualification	(Portugal) OLI	(Italy) LOD	(France) STO	(Portugal) VAL
1	(Portugal) UD Oliveirense	6	5	0	1	29	15	+14	15	Advance to quarter-finals	—	3–4	7–2	4–2
2	(Italy) Amatori Lodi	6	3	1	2	14	13	+1	10	Advance to quarter-finals	2–3	—	1–4	3–1
3	(France) SCRA Saint-Omer	6	2	0	4	14	20	−6	6		2–4	0–2	—	5–2
4	(Portugal) AD Valongo	6	1	1	4	14	23	−9	4		3–8	2–2	4–1	—

Source: World Skate Europe

== Knockout stage ==
=== Quarter-finals ===
In the quarter-finals, each group stage winner plays against a runner-up from another group over two legs in a home-and-away basis. The group winners play away the first leg on 14 March and host the second leg on 11 April 2024.

Team 1	Agg.	Team 2	1st leg	2nd leg
Sporting CP (Portugal)	8–6	(Spain) FC Barcelona	4–1	4–5
Amatori Lodi (Italy)	5–13	(Portugal) FC Porto	1–4	4–9
OC Barcelos (Portugal)	9–3	(Portugal) SL Benfica	4–2	5–1
Trissino (Italy)	9–12	(Portugal) UD Oliveirense	4–4	5–8

14 March 2024
18:30

Sporting CP (Portugal)	4–1	(Spain) FC Barcelona

Pavilhão João Rocha, Lisbon
Referee: Filippo Fronte, Marco Rondina (Italy)
11 April 2024
20:30

FC Barcelona (Spain)	5–4	(Portugal) Sporting CP

Palau Blaugrana, Barcelona
Referee: Franco Ferrari, Claudio Ferraro (Italy)

Sporting CP won 8–6 on aggregate.

14 March 2024
21:00

Amatori Lodi (Italy)	1–4	(Portugal) FC Porto

PalaCastelotti, Lodi
Referee: Sergi Mayor, Alvaro de la Hera Jaudenes (Spain)
11 April 2024
20:00

FC Porto (Portugal)	9–4	(Italy) Amatori Lodi

Dragão Arena, Porto
Referee: Ruben Fernandez, Daniel Villar (Spain)

FC Porto won 13–5 on aggregate.

14 March 2024
21:00

OC Barcelos (Portugal)	4–2	(Portugal) SL Benfica

Pavilhão Municipal de Barcelos, Barcelos
Referee: Ruben Fernandez, Daniel Villar (Spain)
11 April 2024
18:00

SL Benfica (Portugal)	1–5	(Portugal) OC Barcelos

Pavilhão Fidelidade, Lisbon
Referee: Miguel Diaz, Jonathan Sanchez (Spain)

OC Barcelos won 9–3 on aggregate.

14 March 2024
20:45

Trissino (Italy)	4–4	(Portugal) UD Oliveirense

PalaDante, Trissino
Referee: Ivan Gonzalez, Oriol Perez (Spain)
11 April 2024
21:00

UD Oliveirense (Portugal)	8–5	(Italy) Trissino

Pavilhão Dr. Salvador Machado, Oliveira de Azeméis
Referee: Sergi Mayor, David Cantos (Spain)

UD Oliveirense won 12–9 on aggregate.

=== Final-four ===
The semi-finals and final were contested as a final-four tournament, which was played on 11 and 12 May 2024 at the Super Bock Arena in Porto, Portugal.

Semi-finals
11 May
(Portugal) Sporting CP	6
(Portugal) FC Porto	5
11 May
(Portugal) OC Barcelos	3 (1)
(Portugal) UD Oliveirense (p)	3 (2)

Final
12 May
(Portugal) Sporting CP	2
(Portugal) UD Oliveirense	1

==== Semi-finals ====
11 May 2024
12:00

Sporting CP (Portugal)	6–5	(Portugal) FC Porto
Gonzalo Romero 7'; Toni Pérez 16'; Alessandro Verona 28'; Henrique Magalhães 32', 45'; Rafael Bessa 46'		Carlo di Benedetto 21', 47', 48'; Hélder Nunes 23'; Telmo Pinto 40'

Super Bock Arena, Porto
Referee: Miguel Diaz, Jonathan Sánchez (Spain)

11 May 2024
16:30

OC Barcelos (Portugal)	3–3	(Portugal) UD Oliveirense
Miguel Rocha 6'; Luís Querido 23'; Daniel Oliveira 45'		Marc Torra 3'; Facundo Navarro van Kets 20', 30'
Penalties
Miguel Rocha (penalty scored); Daniel Oliveira (penalty missed); Danilo Rampulla (penalty missed); Luís Querido (penalty missed); Álvaro Morais (penalty missed); Miguel Rocha (penalty missed); Bruno Ferreira (penalty missed)	1–2	Marc Torra (penalty missed); Diogo Araújo Abreu (penalty scored); Facundo Navarro van Kets (penalty missed); Lucas Martinez Cristal (penalty missed); Bruno di Benedetto (penalty missed); Diogo Araújo Abreu (penalty missed); Marc Torra (penalty scored)

Super Bock Arena, Porto
Referee: Marco Rondina, Francesco Stallone (Italy)

==== Final ====
12 May 2024
15:00

Sporting CP (Portugal)	2–1	(Portugal) UD Oliveirense
Gonzalo Romero 4'; João Souto 38'		Lucas Martinez Cristal 36'

Super Bock Arena, Porto
Referee: Ruben Fernandez, Daniel Villar (Spain)
