= 2021–22 Rink Hockey Euroleague =

Tournament details
- Host country: Portugal
- City: Torres Novas
- Dates: 23 October 2021– 15 May 2022
- Teams: 8 (from 4 associations)
- Venue: 1 (in 1 host city)

Final positions
- Champions: (Italy) Trissino (1st title)
- Runners-up: (Portugal) Valongo

Tournament statistics
- Matches played: 27
- Goals scored: 181 (6.7 per match)
- Top scorer: (Spain) Pol Galbas (10 goals)

The 2021–22 Rink Hockey Euroleague was the 57th season of Europe's premier club roller hockey tournament organised by World Skate Europe – Rink Hockey, and the 25th and last season since it was renamed from European Champion Clubs' Cup to Euroleague.

GHS Trissino claimed their first time in the club's history against AD Valongo, being the second time in the history of the competition since 1966 that a team outside of Portugal and Spain won the tournament (after Follonica Hockey in 2006).

== Background ==
Taking advantage of the dispute in Luso of the four-team final of the 2020-21 Men's European League on 15 and 16 May, the representatives of the European Roller Hockey Clubs Association (known by its acronym EHCA) and the World Skate roller hockey committee held a meeting to begin working together on the new edition of the continent's top roller hockey competition, with the aim of improving and professionalising it, as well as giving the sport greater visibility.

According to the EHCA clubs, the need to modify the European League was due to the difficult economic situation of European roller hockey, in the words of the Association's spokesman, Toni Miró: "It costs us money to play in Europe. We spend on travel but we don't have any income."

Two months after this first meeting, during the EHCA General Assembly held on 16 July, the EHCA member clubs unanimously agreed not to enter the 2021-22 European League. In a statement issued on 26 July, it was noted that after several meetings were held between the association, the WSE-RH and the WSRH, the European roller hockey committee had not ruled on the recognition of the EHCA as co-organiser, as requested at the last meeting on 21 July, nor had it announced the details of the new edition of the top European roller hockey competition. At this point, it seemed that the EHCA would organise its own competition in September, comprising its member clubs as well as those that had earned their participation through sporting merit.

However, talks continued and after a teleconference held on 29 July, in which the Director of the WS Sports Department, Francesco Zangarini, the Director of WS-RHTC and president of the Royal Spanish Roller Skating Federation (RFEP), Carmelo Paniagua, the Director of WSE-RHTC Agostinho da Silva and president of the FPP, and the President of the EHCA Joao Nuno Araujo, the situation changed. All parties reached an agreement on the competition model for the 2021-22 European League, which would feature a maximum of 16 teams in two groups of eight, with a double-round-robin format and matches played on Thursdays, culminating in a final eight to be contested by the top four teams from each group. The entry of more teams into the competition would necessitate the scheduling of a preliminary round. The EHCA was confident that dialogue would lead to a definitive agreement to work together on organising the top continental roller hockey competition. However, far from reaching a solution, 48 hours after reaching an agreement on the competition model, WS Europe backtracked and maintained the format of four groups of four teams each for a single round. The EHCA announced on 9 September that all its 12 members (Barcelona, Barcelos, Benfica, Caldes, Forte dei Marmi, Liceo, Noia, Oliveirense, Porto, Reus, Saint-Omer and Sporting CP) would only play in the European League under the system agreed by the parties. The top competition in European roller hockey was in a similar situation to that experienced by European basketball when the Euroleague organised its own tournament outside of FIBA.

Finally, the competition draw, held on 10 September, in Paredes, being highlighted the split between WS Europe and the EHCA, as none of its members attended and the draw followed without them.

== Teams ==
League positions of the previous season shown in parentheses (TH: Title holders). Initially, 20 teams were supposed to participate in the event, but the 12 member clubs of the EHCA, in disagreement with the European federation, withdrew before the group stage draw, including the defending champions Sporting CP and the runner-up Porto. This would mark the first time in the competition's history that teams from Spain wouldn't participate, only remaining 8 teams from 4 different countries.

Group stage
~~(Portugal) Sporting CP^{TH} (1st)~~	~~(Spain) Barcelona (1st)~~	~~(Italy) Forte dei Marmi (1st)~~	~~(France) Saint-Omer (-)~~
~~(Portugal) Porto (2nd)~~	~~(Spain) Liceo (2nd)~~	(Italy) Amatori Lodi (2nd)	(France) Coutras (-)
~~(Portugal) Benfica (3rd)~~	~~(Spain) Caldes (3rd)~~	(Italy) Trissino (3rd)	(France) La Vendéenne (-)
~~(Portugal) Barcelos (4th)~~	~~(Spain) Reus (4th)~~	(Italy) Sarzana (4th)	(Portugal) Tomar (6th)
~~(Portugal) Oliveirense (5th)~~	~~(Spain) Noia (6th)~~	(Switzerland) Diessbach (-)	(Portugal) Valongo (7th)

Notes

1. Despite CE Lleida finishing 5th in the 2020–21 OK Liga, CE Noia was a founder member of the EHCA, and therefore qualifying for the competition.

== Group stage ==
In each group, teams played against each other home-and-away in a home-and-away round-robin format, with a total of four national associations were represented in the group stage.

=== Group A ===
Pos	Team	Pld	W	D	L	GF	GA	GD	Pts	Qualification	TRI	TOM	LOD	VEN
1	(Italy) Trissino	6	4	2	0	19	13	+6	14	Advance to semifinals	—	4–4	2–1	2–1
2	(Portugal) Tomar	6	3	3	0	22	15	+7	12	Advance to semifinals	3–3	—	5–2	2–0
3	(Italy) Amatori Lodi	6	2	1	3	16	17	−1	7		2–3	4–4	—	4–1
4	(France) La Vendéenne	6	0	0	6	8	20	−12	0		2–5	2–4	2–3	—

Updated to match(es) played on 21 December 2025. Source:

=== Group B ===
Pos	Team	Pld	W	D	L	GF	GA	GD	Pts	Qualification	VAL	SAR	DIE	COU
1	(Portugal) Valongo	6	4	1	1	28	15	+13	13	Advance to semifinals	—	4–0	5–2	4–1
2	(Italy) Sarzana	6	4	1	1	30	25	+5	13	Advance to semifinals	6–6	—	7–4	5–3
3	(Switzerland) Diessbach	6	2	0	4	20	29	−9	6		1–5	4–7	—	3–1
4	(France) Coutras	6	1	0	5	18	27	−9	3		5–4	4–5	4–6	—

Updated to match(es) played on 21 December 2025. Source:

== Knockout stage ==
The final four tournament took place on 14 and 15 May 2022, and was played at the Palácio dos Desportos in Torres Novas, Portugal.

All times listed below are local time (UTC+00:00).

Semi-finals
14 May 2022
(Italy) Trissino	4
(Italy) Sarzana	0
14 May 2022
(Portugal) Valongo (pen.)	4 (3)
(Portugal) Tomar	4 (1)

Final
15 May 2022
(Italy) Trissino (pen.)	4 (3)
(Portugal) Valongo	4 (1)

=== Semi-finals ===
14 May 2022
15:00

Trissino (Italy)	4–0	(Italy) Sarzana
Emanuel García 12'; João Pinto 17'; Giulio Cocco 32', 42'

Palácio dos Desportos, Torres Novas
14 May 2022
12:00

Valongo (Portugal)	4–4	(Portugal) Tomar
Rafael Bessa 2'; Facundo Bridge 38'; Diogo Barata 41'; Facundo Navarro 47'		Lucas Honório 19', 24'; Guilherme Silva 22'; Tomás Moreira 38'
Penalties
Diogo Abreu (penalty scored); Rafael Bessa (penalty scored); Facundo Navarro (penalty scored)	3–1	(penalty missed) Tomás Moreira; (penalty missed) Lucas Honório; (penalty scored) Filipe Almeida; (penalty missed) Caio

Palácio dos Desportos, Torres Novas

=== Final ===
15 May 2022
15:00

Trissino (Italy)	4–4	(Portugal) Valongo
Davide Gavioli 11'; Andrea Malagoli 14', 22'; Giulio Cocco 45'		Facundo Bridge 1'; Diogo Barata 21'; Facundo Navarro 24'; Rafael Bessa 32'
Penalties
Giulio Cocco (penalty scored); João Pinto (penalty missed); Emanuel Garcia (penalty scored); Andrea Malagoli (penalty scored)	3–1	(penalty missed) Diogo Abreu; (penalty missed) Rafael Bessa; (penalty scored) Facundo Navarro; (penalty missed) Rúben Pereira

Palácio dos Desportos, Torres Novas

2022 Rink Hockey Euroleague winners
(Italy)
Trissino
First title
