= 2022–23 WSE Champions League =

Tournament details
- Cities: Final eight: Viana do Castelo, Portugal
- Dates: 30 September 2022 – 7 May 2023
- Teams: Group stage: 16; Total: 32 (from 7 associations)

Final positions
- Champions: Porto (3rd title)
- Runners-up: Valongo

Tournament statistics
- Matches played: 103
- Goals scored: 654 (6.35 per match)
- Top scorer: (Italy) Giulio Cocco (15 goals)

The 2022–23 WSE Champions League was the 58th season of Europe's premier club roller hockey tournament organised by World Skate Europe – Rink Hockey, and the first season under the WSE Champions League branding. This season expanded the maximum number of participating teams from 16 to 32, introducing two preliminary rounds prior to the group stage. The knockout stage was contested as a final-eight tournament played at the Pavilhão Municipal José Natário in Viana do Castelo, Portugal from 4 to 7 May 2023.

The final was contested between Porto and Valongo, the fifth to feature two Portuguese sides. Porto won 5–1 to secure the club's third title in the competition, ending a 33-year drought since their last win and a run of 11 consecutive final losses. Italian side Trissino were the defending champions, as a result of their win over Valongo in the 2022 final, but were unable to retain their title after elimination in the quarter-finals by Portuguese side Oliveirense.

== Team allocation ==
=== Association ranking ===
For the 2022–23 WSE Champions League, the associations were allocated places according to their coefficient, which takes into account the performance of each association's representative teams in European competitions between the 2017–18 and the 2021–22 seasons (except for the 2019–20 season, which was discarded due to being interrupted). The coefficient is calculated by dividing the total of points accumulated by the number of participating teams.

The D'Hondt method was applied to the coefficient of each association to determine the number of teams entering in each round:

Association ranking and number of participating teams
Rank	Association	Coefficient	Teams	Teams per round		
Rank	Association	Coefficient	Teams	GS	QR2	QR1
1	Portugal	21.667	7	3	2	2
2	Spain	18.500	7	2	2	3
3	Italy	16.235	7	2	2	3
4	France	8.560	5	1	0	4
5	Switzerland	5.727	4	0	1	3
6	Germany	4.909	2	0	1	1
7	England	3.000	2	0	0	2

== Schedule ==
Schedule for 2022–23 WSE Champions League
Phase	Round	Draw date	Date
Qualifying rounds	First qualifying round	23 July 2022	30 September–2 October 2022
Qualifying rounds	Second qualifying round	11 October 2022	16–18 December 2022
Group Stage	Matchday 1	29 December 2022	26 January 2023
Group Stage	Matchday 2	29 December 2022	9 February 2023
Group Stage	Matchday 3	29 December 2022	23 February 2023
Group Stage	Matchday 4	29 December 2022	9 March 2023
Group Stage	Matchday 5	29 December 2022	23 March 2023
Group Stage	Matchday 6	29 December 2022	13 April 2023
Final eight	Quarter-finals	29 December 2022	4–5 May 2023
Final eight	Semi-finals	29 December 2022	6 May 2023
Final eight	Final	29 December 2022	7 May 2023

== First Qualifying Round ==
A total of 16 teams participated, divided into 4 groups of 4 teams by means of a conditional draw so that teams from the same country would not face each other. The teams played in an all-against-all format in a single round, with the team with the lowest ranking in each group hosting the games played between September 30th and October 2nd, 2022. The two best ranked teams from each group advanced to next phase, while the remaining were relegated to the WSE Cup.

=== Group A ===
Pos	Team	Pld	W	D	L	GF	GA	GD	Pts	Qualification	FOR	BRA	ALC	COU
1	(Italy) HC Forte dei Marmi	3	2	1	0	12	4	+8	7	advance to 2nd phase	—	1–1	6–2	5–1
2	(Portugal) HC Braga	3	1	2	0	7	6	+1	5	advance to 2nd phase		—	3–2	3–3
3	(Spain) PAS Alcoy	3	1	0	2	9	10	−1	3	relegated to WSE Cup			—	5–1
4	(France) US Coutras (H)	3	0	1	2	5	13	−8	1	relegated to WSE Cup				—

(H) Hosts

=== Group B ===
Pos	Team	Pld	W	D	L	GF	GA	GD	Pts	Qualification	GRO	VEN	LEI	KIN
1	(Italy) CP Grosseto	3	2	0	1	18	6	+12	6	advance to 2nd phase	—	1–3	3–1	13–2
2	(France) La Vendéenne (H)	3	2	0	1	9	6	+3	6	advance to 2nd phase		—	2–4	4–1
3	(Spain) Lleida	3	2	0	1	19	7	+12	6	relegated to WSE Cup			—	14–1
4	(England) King's Lynn	3	0	0	3	4	31	−27	0	relegated to WSE Cup				—

(H) Hosts

=== Group C ===
Pos	Team	Pld	W	D	L	GF	GA	GD	Pts	Qualification	CAL	VAL	NOI	GEN
1	(Spain) CP Calafell	3	2	1	0	9	4	+5	7	advance to 2nd phase	—	4–2	2–2	3–0
2	(Italy) Hockey Valdagno	3	2	0	1	11	6	+5	6	advance to 2nd phase		—	4–2	5–0
3	(France) Noisy Le Grand	3	1	1	1	10	9	+1	4	relegated to WSE Cup			—	6–3
4	(Switzerland) Geneve RHC (H)	3	0	0	3	3	14	−11	0	relegated to WSE Cup				—

(H) Hosts

=== Group D ===
Pos	Team	Pld	W	D	L	GF	GA	GD	Pts	Qualification	CAL	VAL	QUE	BAS
1	(Spain) CH Caldes	3	1	2	0	7	5	+2	5	advance to 2nd phase	—	1–1	1–1	5–3
2	(Portugal) AD Valongo	3	1	2	0	5	4	+1	5	advance to 2nd phase		—	3–2	1–1
3	(France) HC Quévert (H)	3	1	1	1	9	9	0	4	relegated to WSE Cup			—	6–5
4	(Italy) Hockey Bassano	3	0	1	2	9	12	−3	1	relegated to WSE Cup				—

(H) Hosts

== Second Qualifying Round ==
A total of 16 teams participated: 8 teams that entered this phase and the 8 teams qualified from the previous phase, distributed across 4 groups of 4 teams. The teams played in an all-against-all format in a single round, with the lowest ranked team in each group hosting the games played between December 16th and 18th, 2022. The two best placed in each group qualified for the Group Stage, with the rest being relegated to the WSE Cup.

=== Group A ===
Pos	Team	Pld	W	D	L	GF	GA	GD	Pts	Qualification	OLI	CAL	GRO	DIE
1	(Portugal) U.D. Oliveirense	3	3	0	0	15	7	+8	9	advance to Group stage	—	3–2	7–4	5–1
2	(Spain) CP Calafell	3	2	0	1	13	7	+6	6	advance to Group stage		—	6–1	5–3
3	(Italy) CP Grosseto	3	1	0	2	9	16	−7	3	relegated to WSE Cup			—	4–3
4	(Switzerland) RHC Diessbach (H)	3	0	0	3	7	14	−7	0	relegated to WSE Cup				—

(H) Hosts

=== Group B ===
Pos	Team	Pld	W	D	L	GF	GA	GD	Pts	Qualification	REU	OCB	BRA	VAL
1	(Spain) Reus Deportiu	3	2	1	0	11	8	+3	7	advance to Group stage	—	2–2	3–2	6–4
2	(Portugal) OC Barcelos	3	1	2	0	7	6	+1	5	advance to Group stage		—	3–3	2–1
3	(Portugal) HC Braga	3	1	1	1	6	6	0	4	relegated to WSE Cup			—	1–0
4	(Italy) HC Valdagno (H)	3	0	0	3	5	9	−4	0	relegated to WSE Cup				—

(H) Hosts

=== Group C ===
Pos	Team	Pld	W	D	L	GF	GA	GD	Pts	Qualification	NOI	FOR	FOL	CAL
1	(Spain) CE Noia	3	2	1	0	11	7	+4	7	advance to Group stage	—	3–1	5–3	3–3
2	(Italy) HC Forte dei Marmi (H)	3	2	0	1	7	4	+3	6	advance to Group stage		—	4–0	2–1
3	(Italy) Follonica Hockey	3	1	0	2	8	13	−5	3	relegated to WSE Cup			—	5–4
4	(Spain) CH Caldes	3	0	1	2	8	10	−2	1	relegated to WSE Cup				—

(H) Hosts

=== Group D ===
Pos	Team	Pld	W	D	L	GF	GA	GD	Pts	Qualification	VAL	LOD	VEN	GER
1	(Portugal) AD Valongo	3	3	0	0	17	6	+11	9	advance to Group stage	—	3–3		4–2
2	(Italy) Amatori Wasken Lodi	3	1	1	1	8	7	+1	4	advance to Group stage		—		5–2
3	(France) La Vendéenne RH	3	1	1	1	10	11	−1	4	relegated to WSE Cup	2–1	6–2	—	9–3
4	(Germany) SK Germania Herringen (H)	3	0	0	3	7	18	−11	0	relegated to WSE Cup				—

(H) Hosts

== Group stage ==
A total of 16 teams participate: 8 teams that entered this phase and the 8 teams qualified from the previous phase, distributed across 4 groups of 4 teams. The teams play in a two-round, all-against-all format, between January 26th and April 13th, 2023. The two best classified teams from each group qualify for the Final-Eight.

=== Group A ===
Pos	Team	Pld	W	D	L	GF	GA	GD	Pts	Qualification	BEN	OLI	LIC	CAL
1	(Portugal) Benfica	6	3	3	0	21	14	+7	12	Advance to Final eight	—	4–2	2–2	5–3
2	(Portugal) Oliveirense	6	3	1	2	17	13	+4	10	Advance to Final eight	2–5	—	5–1	4–0
3	(Spain) Liceo	6	1	3	2	16	20	−4	6		3–3	2–3	—	4–4
4	(Spain) Calafell	6	0	3	3	13	20	−7	3		2–2	1–1	3–4	—

Source: World Skate Europe

=== Group B ===
Pos	Team	Pld	W	D	L	GF	GA	GD	Pts	Qualification	TRI	POR	NOI	SAR
1	(Italy) Trissino	6	4	2	0	33	19	+14	14	Advance to Final eight	—	6–2	9–5	7–3
2	(Portugal) Porto	6	3	2	1	22	13	+9	11	Advance to Final eight	3–3	—	5–1	5–0
3	(Spain) Noia	6	2	2	2	18	23	−5	8		4–4	0–0	—	4–2
4	(Italy) Sarzana	6	0	0	6	13	31	−18	0		2–4	3–4	3–4	—

Source: World Skate Europe

=== Group C ===
Pos	Team	Pld	W	D	L	GF	GA	GD	Pts	Qualification	BAR	VAL	FOR	LOD
1	(Spain) Barça	6	4	1	1	26	15	+11	13	Advance to Final eight	—	3–4	6–2	5–0
2	(Portugal) Valongo	6	3	2	1	19	16	+3	11	Advance to Final eight	3–5	—	4–4	2–1
3	(Italy) Forte dei Marmi	6	2	3	1	19	21	−2	9		4–4	3–3	—	3–2
4	(Italy) Amatori Lodi	6	0	0	6	7	19	−12	0		2–3	0–3	2–3	—

Source: World Skate Europe

=== Group D ===
Pos	Team	Pld	W	D	L	GF	GA	GD	Pts	Qualification	SCP	OCB	REU	STO
1	(Portugal) Sporting CP	6	3	2	1	25	16	+9	11	Advance to Final eight	—	3–1	5–7	6–1
2	(Portugal) Barcelos	6	3	1	2	18	15	+3	10	Advance to Final eight	2–2	—	3–1	4–5
3	(Spain) Reus	6	3	1	2	22	20	+2	10		2–2	1–4	—	4–2
4	(France) SCRA Saint-Omer	6	1	0	5	18	32	−14	3		3–7	3–4	4–7	—

Source: World Skate Europe

== Final eight ==
The knockout phase of the competition consists of a final-eight tournament held at the Pavilhão Municipal José Natário in Viana do Castelo, Portugal, from 4 to 7 May 2023. In the quarter-finals, the group stage winners play against a group stage runner-up other than the one from their own group.

All times are local, WEST (UTC+1).

=== Bracket ===
Quarter-finals
4 May
(Portugal) Benfica	2
(Portugal) Porto	4
4 May
(Spain) Barça (a.e.t.)	5
(Portugal) Barcelos	3
5 May
(Italy) Trissino	5 (1)
(Portugal) Oliveirense (p)	5 (3)
5 May
(Portugal) Sporting CP	2
(Portugal) Valongo	3

Semi-finals
6 May
(Portugal) Porto	4
(Spain) Barça	3
6 May
(Portugal) Oliveirense	4
(Portugal) Valongo (a.e.t.)	6

Final
7 May
(Portugal) Porto	5
(Portugal) Valongo	1

=== Quarter-finals ===
4 May 2023
18:00

Benfica (Portugal)	2–4	(Portugal) Porto
Pablo Álvarez 9'; Nil Roca 47'	Report	Gonçalo Alves 3' (pen.), 46'; Carlo di Benedetto 44'; Rafa 49'

Pavilhão Municipal José Natário, Viana do Castelo
Referee: Miguel Díaz, Jonathan Sanchez (Spain)

4 May 2023
21:00

Barça (Spain)	5–3 (a.e.t.)	(Portugal) Barcelos
Pau Bargalló 30'; João Rodrigues 34', 56', 59'; Hélder Nunes 59'	Report	Alvarinho 30'; Vieirinha 47'; Danilo Rampulla 57'

Pavilhão Municipal José Natário, Viana do Castelo
Referee: Claudio Ferraro, Marco Rondina (Italy)

5 May 2023
18:00

Trissino (Italy)	5–5 (a.e.t.)	(Portugal) Oliveirense
João Pinto 7'; Giulio Cocco 23', 42'; Joan Galbas 32'; Andrea Malagoli 58'	Report	Alexandre Marques 16', 36'; Marc Torra 27'; Xavier Cardoso 47'; Lucas Martínez 57'
Penalties
Giulio Cocco (penalty missed); Andrea Malagoli (penalty scored); Joan Galbas (penalty missed); Jordi Mendez (penalty missed)	1–3	Xavier Cardoso (penalty scored); Tomás Pereira (penalty missed); Marc Torra (penalty missed); Lucas Martínez (penalty scored); Nuno Araújo (penalty scored)

Pavilhão Municipal José Natário, Viana do Castelo
Referee: Miguel Díaz, Jonathan Sánchez (Spain)

5 May 2023
21:00

Sporting CP (Portugal)	2–3	(Portugal) Valongo
Gonzalo Romero 34', 46'	Report	Rafa Bessa 30'; Facundo Navarro 36', 45'

Pavilhão Municipal José Natário, Viana do Castelo
Referee: Ivan González (Spain), Francesco Stallone (Italy)

=== Semi-finals ===
6 May 2023
15:00

Porto (Portugal)	4–3	(Spain) Barça
Rafa 5'; Gonçalo Alves 33'; Xavi Barroso 37'; Ezequiel Mena 40'	Report	Pau Bargalló 12', 43'; Hélder Nunes 42'

Pavilhão Municipal José Natário, Viana do Castelo
Referee: Francesco Stallone, Marco Rondina (Italy)

6 May 2023
18:00

Oliveirense (Portugal)	4–6 (a.e.t.)	(Portugal) Valongo
Tomás Pereira 1', 29'; Lucas Martínez 37'; Xavier Cardoso 43'	Report	Facundo Bridge 4', 41'; Nuno Santos 27'; Diogo Abreu 36', 54', 60'

Pavilhão Municipal José Natário, Viana do Castelo
Referee: Miguel Díaz, Jonathan Sánchez (Spain)

=== Final ===
7 May 2023
15:00

Porto (Portugal)	5–1	(Portugal) Valongo
Rafa 8'; Carlo di Benedetto 18', 30'; Gonçalo Alves 23'; Xavi Barroso 49'	Report	Miguel Moura 13'

Pavilhão Municipal José Natário, Viana do Castelo
Referee: Miguel Díaz, Rubén Fernández (Spain)
