= 2017–18 CERH European League =

Tournament details
- Dates: 4 November 2017 – 13 May 2018
- Teams: 16 (from 6 associations)

Final positions
- Champions: (Spain) Barcelona (22nd title)
- Runners-up: (Portugal) Porto

Tournament statistics
- Matches played: 55
- Goals scored: 439 (7.98 per match)
- Top scorer(s): (Portugal) Gonçalo Alves (20 goals)
- All statistics correct as of 5 November 2017.

The 2017–18 CERH European League was the 53rd season of Europe's premier club roller hockey tournament organised by CERH, and the 21st season since it was renamed from European Champion Clubs' Cup to the CERH Champions League/European League.

Reus Deportiu were the defending champions. Barcelona won the trophy for a record 22nd time, winning 4–2 over Porto, who lost their 9th consecutive final and 11th overall, 7 of which against Barcelona.

== Format changes ==
There are not any format changes in the competition system but, as new, the CERH introduced possession clocks as in basketball. Each possession would have a maximum of 45 seconds.

== Team allocation ==
=== Federation ranking ===
For the 2017–18 CERH European League, the associations are allocated places according to their Federation points, which takes into account their performance in European competitions from the 2013–14 to the 2015–16 seasons. Points are calculated by dividing the total of points accumulated by the number of participating teams.

Participation in the European League is reserved to that federations that have an effective capacity to organize annually their own national championships. They all will have at least one place. For allocating the other nine places, the D'Hondt method is used with the coefficient of each federation.

In case of resigns, priority will be given according to the order established by the D'Hondt method.

Rank	Association	Coeff.	Teams	D'Hondt points		
1	Portugal	20.10	4	10.048	6.699	5.024
2	Spain	19.79	4	9.959	6.640	4.980
3	Italy	15.18	3	7.591	5.061	3.795
4	France	8.84	2	4.420	2.947	2.210
5	Germany	6.27	1	3.136	2.091	1.568
6	Switzerland	6.08	1	3.042	2.028	1.521
7	Austria	3.86	0	Not eligible		
8	England	3.00	1	1.500	1.000	0.750

=== Teams ===
League positions of the previous season shown in parentheses (TH: Title holders). As English champions King's Lynn resigned to its place, following the allocation criteria, Italian Follonica occupied its vacant berth.

Participant teams were confirmed on 19 September 2017.

Group stage
(Portugal) Porto (1st)	(Spain) Barcelona (1st)	(Italy) Amatori Lodi (1st)	(France) La Vendéenne (1st)
(Portugal) Benfica (2nd)	(Spain) Reus^{TH} (2nd)	(Italy) Forte dei Marmi (2nd)	(France) Quévert (2nd)
(Portugal) Oliveirense (3rd)	(Spain) Liceo (3rd)	(Italy) Viareggio (3rd)	(Germany) Iserlohn (1st)
(Portugal) Sporting CP (4th)	(Spain) Vic (4th)	(Italy) Follonica (4th)	(Switzerland) Montreux (1st)

== Round dates ==
The schedule of the competition is as follows.

Phase	Round	First leg	Second leg
Group stage	Matchday 1	4 November 2017	
Group stage	Matchday 2	25 November 2017	
Group stage	Matchday 3	9 December 2017	
Group stage	Matchday 4	13 January 2018	
Group stage	Matchday 5	17 February 2018	
Group stage	Matchday 6	10 March 2018	
Knockout phase	Quarter-finals	25 March 2018	7 April 2018
Knockout phase	Semi-finals	12 May 2018	
Knockout phase	Final	13 May 2018	

== Draw ==
The 16 teams were allocated into four pots, with the title holders, Reus Deportiu, being placed directly as head-team of the Group A. The other three seeded teams will be from the three top ranked federations according to these priorities:

1. National champions of those leagues.
2. Highest ranked teams.

In each group, teams played against each other home-and-away in a home-and-away round-robin format.

The group stage will be drawn on 23 September 2017 in Lisbon.

=== Pots ===
Below are the participating teams (with their points at the CERS ranking). Title holders and the champions of the three top leagues in the ranking were assigned to pot 1, while the rest of the pots were established by nationalities.

Pot 1 (by Fed. rank)
Team	Pts
(Spain) Reus	80
(Portugal) Porto	135
(Spain) Barcelona	160
(Italy) Amatori Lodi	45

Pot 2 (Portugal)
Team	Pts
(Portugal) Benfica	155
(Portugal) Oliveirense	90
(Portugal) Sporting CP	52

Pot 3 (Italy)
Team	Pts
(Italy) Forte dei Marmi	80
(Italy) Viareggio	66
(Italy) Follonica	25

Pot 4 (Spain)
Team	Pts
(Spain) Liceo	100
(Spain) Vic	95

Pot 5 (rest of Europe)
Team	Pts
(France) Quévert	65
(France) La Vendéenne	36
(Germany) Iserlohn	36
(Switzerland) Montreux	6

Notes

1. ^{TH} Title holders, automatically placed in Group A.
2. ^{POR} Portuguese league champions, automatically placed in Group B.
3. ^{ESP} Spanish league champions, automatically placed in Group C.
4. ^{ITA} Italian league champions, automatically placed in Group D.

== Group stage ==
Location of teams of the 2017–18 CERH European League group stage.
Red: Group A; Green: Group B; Blue: Group C; Yellow: Group D.

The 16 teams were allocated into four pots, with the title holders, Reus Deportiu, being placed as seeded team in the Group A automatically. The other 3 seeded teams, Porto, Barcelona and Amatori Lodi, were automatically placed in groups B, C and D, respectively. The rest of the teams were drawn into four groups of four, with the restriction that teams from the same association could not be drawn against each other.

In each group, teams played against each other home-and-away in a home-and-away round-robin format.

A total of six national associations were represented in the group stage.

=== Group A ===
Pos	Team	Pld	W	D	L	PF	PA	PD	Pts	Qualification	REU	OLI	VIA	ISE
1	(Spain) Reus Deportiu	6	5	1	0	37	15	+22	16	Advance to quarterfinals	—	5–0	4–4	10–2
2	(Portugal) Oliveirense	6	3	1	2	33	19	+14	10	Advance to quarterfinals	3–6	—	9–3	8–1
3	(Italy) Viareggio	6	2	2	2	31	24	+7	8		2–4	4–4	—	15–2
4	(Germany) Iserlohn	6	0	0	6	10	53	−43	0		4–8	0–9	1–3	—

Source: CERS-Rink Hockey

=== Group B ===
Pos	Team	Pld	W	D	L	PF	PA	PD	Pts	Qualification	POR	FOL	VEN	VIC
1	(Portugal) Porto	6	5	1	0	50	17	+33	16	Advance to quarterfinals	—	7–4	8–3	13–2
2	(Italy) Follonica	6	4	0	2	29	29	0	12	Advance to quarterfinals	1–7	—	6–4	9–6
3	(France) La Vendéenne	6	1	1	4	21	34	−13	4		3–11	5–8	—	1–1
4	(Spain) Vic	6	0	2	4	13	33	−20	2		4–4	0–1	0–5	—

Source: CERS-Rink Hockey

=== Group C ===
Pos	Team	Pld	W	D	L	PF	PA	PD	Pts	Qualification	BAR	BEN	FOR	MON
1	(Spain) Barcelona	6	6	0	0	29	6	+23	18	Advance to quarterfinals	—	2–0	2–0	3–0
2	(Portugal) Benfica	6	3	1	2	36	21	+15	10	Advance to quarterfinals	4–8	—	6–4	14–2
3	(Italy) Forte dei Marmi	6	2	1	3	23	16	+7	7		2–4	1–1	—	12–1
4	(Switzerland) Montreux	6	0	0	6	9	54	−45	0		0–10	4–11	1–4	—

Source: CERS-Rink Hockey

=== Group D ===
Pos	Team	Pld	W	D	L	PF	PA	PD	Pts	Qualification	SCP	LIC	LOD	QUE
1	(Portugal) Sporting CP	6	4	1	1	24	13	+11	13	Advance to quarterfinals	—	5–3	7–1	6–1
2	(Spain) Liceo	6	3	2	1	23	16	+7	11	Advance to quarterfinals	1–1	—	1–1	6–3
3	(Italy) Amatori Lodi	6	2	2	2	19	24	−5	8		7–4	4–7	—	3–3
4	(France) Quévert	6	0	1	5	11	24	−13	1		0–1	3–5	2–3	—

Source: CERS-Rink Hockey

== Knockout phase ==
The knockout phase comprises a quarter-final round and the final four tournament. In the quarter-finals, group stage winners play against group stage runners-up, the latter hosting the first of two legs. The winners qualify for the final four, which will take place at the ground of one of the four finalists.

=== Quarter-finals ===
Team 1	Agg.	Team 2	1st leg	2nd leg
Liceo (Spain)	6–8	(Spain) Reus Deportiu	4–1	2–7
Benfica (Portugal)	5–11	(Portugal) Porto	3–2	2–9
Follonica (Italy)	4–8	(Spain) Barcelona	3–3	1–5
Oliveirense (Portugal)	4–6	(Portugal) Sporting CP	2–3	2–3

=== Final Four bracket ===
The Final Four will be played on 12 and 13 May in Porto, Portugal.

Semifinals
(Spain) Reus Deportiu	2
(Spain) Barcelona	4
(Portugal) Porto	5
(Portugal) Sporting CP	2

Final
(Spain) Barcelona	4
(Portugal) Porto	2

==== Semifinals ====
12 May 2018

Reus Deportiu (Spain)	2–4	(Spain) Barcelona
Raül Marín 4', 34'	Report	Pau Bargalló 2'; Xavi Barroso 19' (pen.); Lucas Ordóñez 21'; Pablo Álvarez 22'

Dragão Caixa, Porto
Referee: Paulo Rainha (POR), Joaquim Pinto (POR)

12 May 2018

Porto (Portugal)	5–2	(Portugal) Sporting CP
Antoni Baliu 8', 45'; Hélder Nunes 9', 34'; Gonçalo Alves 12' (pen.)	Report	Toni Pérez 22', 48'

Dragão Caixa, Porto
Referee: Óscar Valverde (ESP), Alberto López (ESP)

=== Final ===
13 May 2018

Barcelona (Spain)	4–2	(Portugal) Porto
Lucas Ordóñez 12'; Pablo Alvarez 27'; Pau Bargalló 32', 49'	Report	Gonçalo Alves 33'; Hélder Nunes 36'

Dragão Caixa, Porto
Referee: Alessandro Eccelsi (ITA), Filippo Fronte (ITA)

== See also ==
- 2017–18 CERS Cup
- 2017 CERH Continental Cup
- 2017–18 CERH Women's European Cup
