= WSE Champions League =

European roller hockey competition

- Current season, competition or edition: 2026–27 WSE Champions League
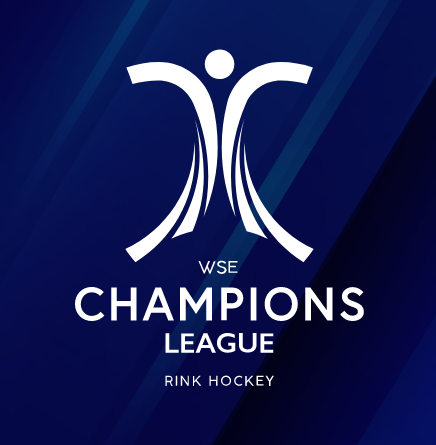
- Sport: Roller hockey
- Founded: 1965; 61 years ago (rebranded in 2022)
- Organising body: World Skate Europe - Rink Hockey
- No. of teams: 32 (since 2022–23)
- Most recent champion: (Portugal) Porto (4th title)
- Most titles: (Spain) Barcelona (22 titles)
- Broadcaster: WSE TV
- Related competitions: Europe: World Skate Europe Cup (2nd tier); Continental Cup; International: Intercontinental Cup
- Website: Official website

The WSE Champions League is an annual club roller hockey competition organised by the World Skate Europe - Rink Hockey and contested by teams from the top-ranked European leagues. It is the top-level European club competition and its winner earns the right to play the Continental Cup, against the winners of the second-tier World Skate Europe Cup, and the Intercontinental Cup, against the winners of the South American Club Championship.

The current champions are Portuguese side Porto, who defeated Barcelona in the 2026 final to secure their fourth title in the competition. It was the first win for Porto in a final against Barcelona, after losing their previous seven final appearances against the Catalans in 1985, 1997, 2000, 2004, 2005, 2014 and 2018.

== History ==
Since its foundation in 1965, under the name of European Cup, the competition has been dominated by teams from Spain (mainly from Catalonia), Portugal and Italy. In 1997, the European Cup and the European Cup Winners' Cup were merged to create the Champions League. In 2007, the competition name and format was changed to form the European League, a 16-team competition with no preliminary rounds. In 2020, the format was changed to a 9-team competition with no preliminary rounds. In 2021, the format was changed to an 8-team competition with no preliminary rounds. In 2023, along with a renaming back to Champions League, the format was again changed to accommodate 32 teams and two preliminary rounds.

The most successful team is Barcelona, having won a record 22 titles, including eight consecutive between 1978 and 1985. Barcelona are followed by four other Spanish teams, making Spain the most successful country in the competition, with 44 titles. Four Portuguese teams have won the trophy by nine times, while two Italian teams have won the trophy by two times.

== Format ==
Since 2023, the competition is composed by 16 teams placed into 4 groups. The first 2 teams of each group play the final-eight.

== Finals ==
Trophy given to the winners from the 2012–13 to the 2021–22 seasons.

Season	Winners	Score	Runners-up	Venue (finals)
1965–66	(Spain) Voltregà	3–1, 6–2	(Italy) HC Monza	Two-legged finals
1966–67	(Spain) Reus Deportiu	3–3, 6–3	(Italy) HC Monza	Two-legged finals
1967–68	(Spain) Reus Deportiu (2)	2–0, 6–2	(Italy) Triestina	Two-legged finals
1968–69	(Spain) Reus Deportiu (3)	7–1, 0–3	(Portugal) Benfica	Two-legged finals
1969–70	(Spain) Reus Deportiu (4)	12–5, 8–6	(Spain) Voltregà	Two-legged finals
1970–71	(Spain) Reus Deportiu (5)	7–7, 9–4	(Italy) Novara	Two-legged finals
1971–72	(Spain) Reus Deportiu (6)	2–10, 11–0	(Italy) Novara	Two-legged finals
1972–73	(Spain) Barcelona	5–3, 7–7	(Portugal) Benfica	Two-legged finals
1973–74	(Spain) Barcelona (2)	8–5, 4–5	(Portugal) Lourenço Marques	Two-legged finals
1974–75	(Spain) Voltregà (2)	5–5, 6–4	(Spain) Barcelona	Two-legged finals
1975–76	(Spain) Voltregà (3)	2–2, 3–1	(Spain) Barcelona	Two-legged finals
1976–77	(Portugal) Sporting CP	6–0, 6–3	(Spain) Vilanova	Two-legged finals
1977–78	(Spain) Barcelona (3)	8–3, 5–1	(Belgium) Royal Sunday	Two-legged finals
1978–79	(Spain) Barcelona (4)	1–3, 6–2	(Spain) Reus Deportiu	Two-legged finals
1979–80	(Spain) Barcelona (5)	5–2, 6–3	(Portugal) Benfica	Two-legged finals
1980–81	(Spain) Barcelona (6)	6–1, 6–2	(Italy) Giovinazzo	Two-legged finals
1981–82	(Spain) Barcelona (7)	4–1, 6–4	(Italy) Amatori Lodi	Two-legged finals
1982–83	(Spain) Barcelona (8)	9–1, 14–6	(Spain) Sentmenat	Two-legged finals
1983–84	(Spain) Barcelona (9)	2–3, 6–2	(Spain) Liceo	Two-legged finals
1984–85	(Spain) Barcelona (10)	4–5, 6–4	(Portugal) Porto	Two-legged finals
1985–86	(Portugal) Porto	5–3, 7–5	(Italy) Novara	Two-legged finals
1986–87	(Spain) Liceo	4–2, 4–3	(Portugal) Porto	Two-legged finals
1987–88	(Spain) Liceo (2)	1–2, 4–1	(Italy) Novara	Two-legged finals
1988–89	(Spain) Noia	7–4, 3–1	(Portugal) Sporting CP	Two-legged finals
1989–90	(Portugal) Porto (2)	6–0, 5–2	(Spain) Noia	Two-legged finals
1990–91	(Portugal) Barcelos	4–4, 4–3	(Italy) Roller Monza	Two-legged finals
1991–92	(Spain) Liceo (3)	7–6, 2–2	(Italy) Seregno	Two-legged finals
1992–93	(Spain) Igualada	4–1, 8–3	(Portugal) Benfica	Two-legged finals
1993–94	(Spain) Igualada (2)	7–4, 2–3	(Portugal) Barcelos	Two-legged finals
1994–95	(Spain) Igualada (3)	3–4, 3–1	(Portugal) Benfica	Two-legged finals
1995–96	(Spain) Igualada (4)	0–0, 2–2 (a)	(Spain) Barcelona	Two-legged finals
1996–97	(Spain) Barcelona (11)	4–3	(Portugal) Porto	(Spain) Palau Blaugrana, Barcelona
1997–98	(Spain) Igualada (5)	8–1	(Italy) Amatori Vercelli	(Italy) PalaPregnolato, Vercelli
1998–99	(Spain) Igualada (6)	6–5	(Portugal) Porto	(Spain) Pavelló Poliesportiu de Les Comes, Igualada
1999–2000	(Spain) Barcelona (12)	3–2	(Portugal) Porto	(Portugal) Pavilhão Rosa Mota, Porto
2000–01	(Spain) Barcelona (13)	4–2	(Spain) Liceo	(Spain) Palacio de Deportes San Pablo, Seville
2001–02	(Spain) Barcelona (14)	2–1	(Portugal) Barcelos	(Portugal) Pavilhão Multiusos, Guimarães
2002–03	(Spain) Liceo (4)	4–3	(Spain) Igualada	(Spain) Pazo dos Deportes de Riazor, A Coruña
2003–04	(Spain) Barcelona (15)	3–0	(Portugal) Porto	(Italy) PalaBarsacchi, Viareggio
2004–05	(Spain) Barcelona (16)	3–2	(Portugal) Porto	(Spain) Palau d'Esports del Reus Deportiu, Reus
2005–06	(Italy) Follonica	League	(Portugal) Porto	(Portugal) Palácio dos Desportos, Torres Novas
2006–07	(Spain) Barcelona (17)	5–2	(Italy) Bassano	(Italy) PalaBassano, Bassano del Grappa
2007–08	(Spain) Barcelona (18)	5–2	(Spain) Reus Deportiu	(Spain) Palau Blaugrana, Barcelona
2008–09	(Spain) Reus Deportiu (7)	2–2 (2–1 p)	(Spain) Vic	(Italy) PalaBassano, Bassano del Grappa
2009–10	(Spain) Barcelona (19)	4–1	(Spain) Vic	(Italy) PalaLido, Valdagno
2010–11	(Spain) Liceo (5)	7–4	(Spain) Reus Deportiu	Poliesportiu d'Andorra, Andorra la Vella
2011–12	(Spain) Liceo (6)	4–2	(Spain) Barcelona	(Italy) PalaCastellotti, Lodi
2012–13	(Portugal) Benfica	6–5 (a.e.t.)	(Portugal) Porto	(Portugal) Dragão Caixa, Porto
2013–14	(Spain) Barcelona (20)	3–1	(Portugal) Porto	(Spain) Palau Blaugrana, Barcelona
2014–15	(Spain) Barcelona (21)	4–3	(Spain) Vic	(Italy) PalaSind, Bassano del Grappa
2015–16	(Portugal) Benfica (2)	5–3	(Portugal) Oliveirense	(Portugal) Pavilhão Fidelidade, Lisbon
2016–17	(Spain) Reus Deportiu (8)	4–1	(Portugal) Oliveirense	(Spain) Pavelló Barris Nord, Lleida
2017–18	(Spain) Barcelona (22)	4–2	(Portugal) Porto	(Portugal) Dragão Caixa, Porto
2018–19	(Portugal) Sporting CP (2)	5–2	(Portugal) Porto	(Portugal) Pavilhão João Rocha, Lisbon
2019–20	Abandoned (due to the COVID-19 pandemic in Europe).			
2020–21	(Portugal) Sporting CP (3)	4–3 (a.e.t.)	(Portugal) Porto	(Portugal) Pavilhão Gimnodesportivo Municipal, Luso
2021–22	(Italy) GSH Trissino	4–4 (3–1 p)	(Portugal) Valongo	(Portugal) Palácio dos Desportos, Torres Novas
2022–23	(Portugal) Porto (3)	5–1	(Portugal) Valongo	(Portugal) Pavilhão Municipal José Natário, Viana do Castelo
2023–24	(Portugal) Sporting CP (4)	2–1	(Portugal) Oliveirense	(Portugal) Super Bock Arena, Porto
2024–25	(Portugal) Barcelos (2)	1–1 (2–0 p)	(Portugal) Porto	(Portugal) Centro de Desportos e Congressos, Matosinhos
2025–26	(Portugal) Porto (4)	3–1	(Spain) Barcelona	(Portugal) Pavilhão Multidesportos Dr. Mário Mexia, Coimbra

== Performances ==
=== By club ===
Club	Winners	Runners-up	Years won	Years runners-up
(Spain) Barcelona	22	5	1973, 1974, 1978, 1979, 1980, 1981, 1982, 1983, 1984, 1985, 1997, 2000, 2001, 2002, 2004, 2005, 2007, 2008, 2010, 2014, 2015, 2018	1975, 1976, 1996, 2012, 2026
(Spain) Reus Deportiu	8	3	1967, 1968, 1969, 1970, 1971, 1972, 2009, 2017	1979, 2008, 2011
(Spain) Liceo	6	2	1987, 1988, 1992, 2003, 2011, 2012	1984, 2001
(Spain) Igualada	6	1	1993, 1994, 1995, 1996, 1998, 1999	2003
(Portugal) Porto	4	14	1986, 1990, 2023, 2026	1985, 1987, 1997, 1999, 2000, 2004, 2005, 2006, 2013, 2014, 2018, 2019, 2021, 2025
(Portugal) Sporting CP	4	1	1977, 2019, 2021, 2024	1989
(Spain) Voltregà	3	1	1966, 1975, 1976	1970
(Portugal) Benfica	2	5	2013, 2016	1969, 1973, 1980, 1993, 1995
(Portugal) Barcelos	2	2	1991, 2025	1994, 2002
(Spain) Noia	1	1	1989	1990
(Italy) Follonica	1	0	2006	—
(Italy) GSH Trissino	1	0	2022	—
(Italy) Novara	0	4	—	1971, 1972, 1986, 1988
(Spain) Vic	0	3	—	2009, 2010, 2015
(Portugal) Oliveirense	0	3	—	2016, 2017, 2024
(Italy) HC Monza	0	2	—	1966, 1967
(Portugal) Valongo	0	2	—	2022, 2023
(Italy) Triestina	0	1	—	1968
(Portugal) Lourenço Marques	0	1	—	1974
(Spain) Vilanova	0	1	—	1977
(Belgium) Royal Sunday	0	1	—	1978
(Italy) Giovinazzo	0	1	—	1981
(Italy) Amatori Lodi	0	1	—	1982
(Spain) Sentmenat	0	1	—	1983
(Italy) Roller Monza	0	1	—	1991
(Italy) Seregno	0	1	—	1992
(Italy) Amatori Vercelli	0	1	—	1998
(Italy) Bassano	0	1	—	2007

=== By country ===
Country	Winners	Runners-up	Winners	Runners-up
Spain	46	18	Barcelona (22), Reus Deportiu (8), Liceo (6), Igualada (6), Voltregà (3), Noia	Barcelona (5), Vic (3), Reus Deportiu (3), Liceo (2), Voltregà, Vilanova, Sentmenat, Noia, Igualada
Portugal	12	28	Sporting CP (4), Porto (4), Benfica (2), Barcelos (2)	Porto (14), Benfica (5), Oliveirense (3), Barcelos (2), Valongo (2), Lourenço Marques, Sporting CP
Italy	2	13	Follonica, Trissino	Novara (4), HC Monza (2), Triestina, Giovinazzo, Amatori Lodi, Roller Monza, Seregno, Amatori Vercelli, Bassano
Belgium	0	1	—	Royal Sunday
