= 1996–97 CERH European League =

Tournament details
- Teams: 21

Final positions
- Champions: Barcelona (11th title)
- Runners-up: Porto

Tournament statistics
- Matches played: 52
- Goals scored: 479 (9.21 per match)

The 1996–97 CERH European League was the 32nd edition of the CERH European League organized by CERH. Its Final Four was held in Barcelona, Spain.

== Format changes ==
As a result of the expansion of the competition, two preliminary rounds were played before the group stage, composed by eight teams divided into two groups of four each one, thus qualifying the two first qualified teams to the Final Four.

== Preliminary round ==
| Team 1 | Agg. | Team 2 | 1st leg | 2nd leg |
|---|---|---|---|---|
| Wimmis (Switzerland) | 11–8 | (Netherlands) Agor Dordrecht | 6–3 | 5–5 |
| Reus Deportiu (Spain) | 4–5 | (Italy) Salerno | 4–2 | 0–3 |
| Wolfurt (Austria) | 3–26 | (Spain) Vic | 1–9 | 2–17 |
| Saint-Omer (France) | 8–12 | (France) La Vendéenne | 5–4 | 3–8 |
| Herne Bay (England) | 7–11 | (France) Quévert | 4–7 | 3–4 |

== First round ==
| Team 1 | Agg. | Team 2 | 1st leg | 2nd leg |
|---|---|---|---|---|
| Cronenberg (Germany) | 6–23 | (Portugal) Porto | 3–10 | 3–13 |
| Barcelona (Spain) | 24–2 | (Switzerland) Thunerstern | 14–1 | 10–1 |
| Genève (Switzerland) | 2–10 | (Italy) Novara | 1–1 | 1–9 |
| La Vendéenne (France) | w.o. | (Portugal) Benfica | w.o. | w.o. |
| Quévert (France) | 4–26 | (Spain) Igualada | 1–11 | 3–15 |
| Amatori Vercelli (Italy) | 19–1 | (Switzerland) Wimmis | 12–0 | 7–1 |
| Salerno (Italy) | 6–5 | (Portugal) Barcelos | 4–3 | 2–2 |
| Liceo (Spain) | 7–4 | (Spain) Vic | 6–3 | 1–1 |

== Group stage ==
In each group, teams played against each other home-and-away in a home-and-away round-robin format.

The two first qualified teams advanced to the Final Four.

=== Group A ===
| Pos | Team | Pld | W | D | L | GF | GA | GD | Pts | Qualification | IGU | POR | NOV | SAL |
|---|---|---|---|---|---|---|---|---|---|---|---|---|---|---|
| 1 | (Spain) Igualada | 6 | 4 | 0 | 2 | 21 | 9 | +12 | 8 | Advance to Final Four | — | 4–3 | 4–1 | 7–0 |
| 2 | (Portugal) Porto | 6 | 4 | 0 | 2 | 24 | 21 | +3 | 8 | Advance to Final Four | 2–1 | — | 5–4 | 4–2 |
| 3 | (Italy) Novara | 6 | 3 | 1 | 2 | 23 | 17 | +6 | 7 | | 3–0 | 7–5 | — | 7–2 |
| 4 | (Italy) Salerno | 6 | 0 | 1 | 5 | 8 | 29 | −21 | 1 | | 0–5 | 3–5 | 1–1 | — |

=== Group B ===
| Pos | Team | Pld | W | D | L | GF | GA | GD | Pts | Qualification | LIC | BAR | VER | VEN |
|---|---|---|---|---|---|---|---|---|---|---|---|---|---|---|
| 1 | (Spain) Liceo | 6 | 4 | 1 | 1 | 43 | 19 | +24 | 9 | Advance to Final Four | — | 4–1 | 4–0 | 12–1 |
| 2 | (Spain) Barcelona | 6 | 3 | 2 | 1 | 46 | 16 | +30 | 8 | Advance to Final Four | 5–5 | — | 4–3 | 25–2 |
| 3 | (Italy) Amatori Vercelli | 6 | 3 | 1 | 2 | 32 | 19 | +13 | 7 | | 10–4 | 1–1 | — | 10–3 |
| 4 | (France) La Vendéenne | 6 | 0 | 0 | 6 | 12 | 79 | −67 | 0 | | 2–14 | 1–10 | 3–8 | — |

== Final four ==
The Final Four was played in the Palau Blaugrana in Barcelona, Spain.

Barcelona achieved their eleventh title.

=== Bracket ===
Semifinals
(Spain) Barcelona | 3
(Spain) Igualada | 2
(Spain) Liceo | 6
(Portugal) Porto | 8

Final
(Spain) Barcelona (p) | 3 (4)
(Portugal) Porto | 3 (3)
Third place
(Spain) Igualada | 9
(Spain) Liceo | 2
