= 1997–98 CERH European League =

Tournament details
- Teams: 17

Final positions
- Champions: Igualada (5th title)
- Runners-up: Amatori Vercelli

The 1997–98 CERH European League was the 34th edition of the CERH European League organized by CERH. Its Final Four was held in Vercelli, Italy.

== Preliminary round ==
Team 1	Agg.	Team 2	1st leg	2nd leg
Benfica (Portugal)	17–6	(France) Vaulx-en-Velin	10–2	7–4

== First round ==
Team 1	Agg.	Team 2	1st leg	2nd leg
Oliveirense (Portugal)	4–14	(Spain) Barcelona	2–5	2–9
Uttigen (Switzerland)	7–28	(Portugal) Porto	3–7	4–21
Amatori Vercelli (Italy)	10–2	(Switzerland) Genève	7–0	3–2
Liceo (Spain)	4–4 (p)	(Portugal) Benfica	2–2	2–2
Herne Bay (England)	5–11	(France) La Vendéenne	2–3	3–8
Novara (Italy)	5–4	(Spain) Vic	3–2	2–2
Barcelos (Portugal)	9–7	(Italy) Salerno	5–1	4–6
Igualada (Spain)	13–1	(France) Quévert	9–1	4–0

== Group stage ==
In each group, teams played against each other home-and-away in a home-and-away round-robin format.

The two first qualified teams advanced to the Final Four.

=== Group A ===
Pos	Team	Pld	W	D	L	GF	GA	GD	Pts	Qualification	NOV	IGU	BCS	VEN
1	(Italy) Novara	6	5	1	0	47	15	+32	11	Advance to Final Four	—	3–2	5–3	21–1
2	(Spain) Igualada	6	3	1	2	41	14	+27	7	Advance to Final Four	5–6	—	10–3	11–0
3	(Portugal) Barcelos	6	2	2	2	32	29	+3	6		3–3	1–1	—	19–9
4	(France) La Vendéenne	6	0	0	6	13	75	−62	0		1–9	1–12	1–3	—

=== Group B ===
Pos	Team	Pld	W	D	L	GF	GA	GD	Pts	Qualification	BAR	VER	POR	LIC
1	(Spain) Barcelona	6	5	1	0	29	18	+11	11	Advance to Final Four	—	7–1	3–3	4–3
2	(Italy) Amatori Vercelli	6	3	1	2	21	22	−1	7	Advance to Final Four	3–4	—	6–3	3–1
3	(Portugal) Porto	6	1	2	3	20	27	−7	4		5–7	5–5	—	3–2
4	(Spain) Liceo	6	1	0	5	15	18	−3	2		3–4	2–3	4–1	—

== Final four ==
The Final Four was played in Vercelli, Italy.

Igualada achieved their fifth title.

=== Bracket ===
Semifinals
(Spain) Igualada	8
(Spain) Barcelona	1
(Italy) Amatori Vercelli	4
(Italy) Novara	3

Final
(Spain) Igualada	8
(Italy) Amatori Vercelli	1
Third place
(Spain) Barcelona	5
(Italy) Novara	3
