= 1998–99 CERH European League =

Tournament details
- Teams: 17

Final positions
- Champions: Igualada (6th title)
- Runners-up: Porto

The 1998–99 CERH European League was the 35th edition of the CERH European League organized by CERH. Its Final Four was held on 1 and 2 May 1999 in Igualada, Spain.

== Preliminary round ==
Team 1	Agg.	Team 2	1st leg	2nd leg
Thunerstern (Switzerland)	4–7	(Portugal) Paço d'Arcos	0–2	4–5
Mérignac (France)	4–10	(France) Quévert	2–3	2–7

== First round ==
Team 1	Agg.	Team 2	1st leg	2nd leg
Paço d'Arcos (Portugal)	7–5	(Italy) Amatori Vercelli	4–2	3–3
Genève (Switzerland)	3–17	(Spain) Vic	2–8	1–9
Benfica (Portugal)	30–2	(Netherlands) Valkenswaardse	19–1	11–1
Noia (Spain)	3–9	(Spain) Igualada	3–4	0–5
Uttigen (Switzerland)	6–18	(Spain) Barcelona	2–9	4–9
Prato (Italy)	4–7	(Italy) Novara	2–3	2–4
Quévert (France)	3–30	(Portugal) Porto	1–5	2–25
Herne Bay (England)	14–5	(France) La Vendéenne	5–4	9–1

== Group stage ==
In each group, teams played against each other home-and-away in a home-and-away round-robin format.

The two first qualified teams advanced to the Final Four.

=== Group A ===
Pos	Team	Pld	W	D	L	GF	GA	GD	Pts	Qualification	POR	IGU	BEN	PAR
1	(Portugal) Porto	6	5	1	0	31	13	+18	11	Advance to Final Four	—	8–3	3–1	8–2
2	(Spain) Igualada	6	3	1	2	25	20	+5	7	Advance to Final Four	2–2	—	6–3	6–1
3	(Portugal) Benfica	6	2	0	4	24	25	−1	4		4–5	3–1	—	9–5
4	(Portugal) Paço d'Arcos	6	1	0	5	17	39	−22	2		1–5	3–7	5–4	—

=== Group B ===
Pos	Team	Pld	W	D	L	GF	GA	GD	Pts	Qualification	BAR	NOV	VIC	HER
1	(Spain) Barcelona	6	6	0	0	38	12	+26	12	Advance to Final Four	—	3–1	6–1	9–3
2	(Italy) Novara	6	3	1	2	30	16	+14	7	Advance to Final Four	2–5	—	2–2	16–2
3	(Spain) Vic	6	2	1	3	32	21	+11	5		3–6	2–3	—	9–1
4	(England) Herne Bay	6	0	0	6	13	64	−51	0		2–9	2–6	3–15	—

== Final four ==
The Final Four was played in the Poliesportiu Les Comes, Igualada, Spain.

Igualada achieved their sixth title.

=== Bracket ===
Semifinals
1 May
(Spain) Igualada	3
(Spain) Barcelona	1
1 May
(Portugal) Porto	7
(Italy) Novara	4

Final
2 May
(Spain) Igualada (p)	5 (6)
(Portugal) Porto	5 (5)
Third place
2 May
(Spain) Barcelona	5
(Italy) Novara	2
