= 1999–2000 CERH European League =

Tournament details
- Teams: 17

Final positions
- Champions: Barcelona (13th title)
- Runners-up: Porto

The 1999–2000 CERH European League was the 36th edition of the CERH European League organized by CERH. Its Final Four was held on 29 and 30 April 2000 in Porto, Portugal.

== Preliminary round ==
| Team 1 | Agg. | Team 2 | 1st leg | 2nd leg |
|---|---|---|---|---|
| Saint-Omer (France) | 14–5 | (England) Letchworth | 11–3 | 7–2 |

== First round ==
| Team 1 | Agg. | Team 2 | 1st leg | 2nd leg |
|---|---|---|---|---|
| Benfica (Portugal) | 19–4 | (France) Saint-Omer | 8–0 | 11–4 |
| Porto (Portugal) | 10–1 | (France) Quévert | 7–0 | 3–1 |
| Thunerstern (Switzerland) | 5–22 | (Italy) Novara | 4–16 | 1–6 |
| Mérignac (France) | 7–25 | (Spain) Igualada | 4–12 | 3–13 |
| Liceo (Spain) | 5–6 | (Portugal) Barcelos | 4–0 | 1–6 |
| Scandiano (Italy) | 3–17 | (Spain) Barcelona | 1–5 | 2–12 |
| Uttigen (Switzerland) | 8–16 | (Switzerland) Genève | 5–3 | 3–3 |
| Prato (Italy) | 4–5 | (Spain) Vic | 4–2 | 0–3 |

== Group stage ==
In each group, teams played against each other home-and-away in a home-and-away round-robin format.

The two first qualified teams advanced to the Final Four.

=== Group A ===
| Pos | Team | Pld | W | D | L | GF | GA | GD | Pts | Qualification | BEN | NOV | IGU | BCS |
|---|---|---|---|---|---|---|---|---|---|---|---|---|---|---|
| 1 | (Portugal) Benfica | 6 | 4 | 1 | 1 | 19 | 12 | +7 | 9 | Advance to Final Four | — | 2–3 | 3–1 | 4–3 |
| 2 | (Italy) Novara | 6 | 2 | 2 | 2 | 24 | 23 | +1 | 6 | Advance to Final Four | 4–4 | — | 1–2 | 9–7 |
| 3 | (Spain) Igualada | 6 | 2 | 1 | 3 | 11 | 15 | −4 | 5 | | 0–2 | 3–2 | — | 3–5 |
| 4 | (Portugal) Barcelos | 6 | 1 | 2 | 3 | 23 | 27 | −4 | 4 | | 1–4 | 5–5 | 2–2 | — |

=== Group B ===
| Pos | Team | Pld | W | D | L | GF | GA | GD | Pts | Qualification | BAR | POR | VIC | UTT |
|---|---|---|---|---|---|---|---|---|---|---|---|---|---|---|
| 1 | (Spain) Barcelona | 6 | 5 | 0 | 1 | 34 | 14 | +20 | 10 | Advance to Final Four | — | 5–2 | 4–0 | 8–3 |
| 2 | (Portugal) Porto | 6 | 5 | 0 | 1 | 27 | 15 | +12 | 10 | Advance to Final Four | 3–2 | — | 4–3 | 9–2 |
| 3 | (Spain) Vic | 6 | 2 | 0 | 4 | 28 | 21 | +7 | 4 | | 3–4 | 2–3 | — | 15–2 |
| 4 | (Switzerland) Uttigen | 6 | 0 | 0 | 6 | 15 | 54 | −39 | 0 | | 3–11 | 1–6 | 4–5 | — |

== Final four ==
The Final Four was played in the Pavilhão Rosa Mota, Porto, Portugal.

Barcelona achieved their 13th title.

=== Bracket ===
Semifinals
29 April
(Portugal) Porto | 4
(Portugal) Benfica | 1
29 April
(Italy) Novara | 1
(Spain) Barcelona | 4

Final
30 April
(Portugal) Porto | 2 (2)
(Spain) Barcelona (p) | 2 (3)
Third place
30 April
(Portugal) Benfica | 3
(Italy) Novara | 6
