= 1987–88 Roller Hockey Champions Cup =

1987–88 Champions Cup
Tournament details
- Teams: 10

Final positions
- Champions: Liceo (2nd title)
- Runners-up: Novara

Tournament statistics
- Matches played: 18
- Goals scored: 177 (9.83 per match)

The 1987–88 Roller Hockey Champions Cup was the 24th edition of the Roller Hockey Champions Cup organized by CERH.

Liceo achieved their second consecutive title.

== Teams ==
The champions of the main European leagues played this competition, consisting in a double-legged knockout tournament. As Spanish league champions Liceo qualified as title holder, Barcelona was also admitted as the Spanish representative.

== Bracket ==
First round
(France) La Vendéenne	3	4	7
(Italy) Novara	13	24	37
(Germany) Walsum	4	3	7
(Switzerland) Thunerstern	2	7	9

Quarterfinals
(Italy) Novara	5	5	10
(Spain) Barcelona	5	4	9
(Netherlands) Residentie	6	6	12
(Belgium) Kurink	4	4	8
(England) Southsea	3	2	5
(Switzerland) Thunerstern	1	7	8
(Portugal) Porto	4	2	6
(Spain) Liceo	0	7	7

Semifinals
(Italy) Novara	11	6	17
(Netherlands) Residentie	3	3	6
(Switzerland) Thunerstern	2	1	3
(Spain) Liceo	11	7	18

Final
(Italy) Novara	2	1	3
(Spain) Liceo	1	4	5
