= 1969–70 Roller Hockey Champions Cup =

1969–70 Champions Cup
Tournament details
- Teams: 11

Final positions
- Champions: Reus Deportiu (4th title)
- Runners-up: Voltregà

Tournament statistics
- Matches played: 19
- Goals scored: 229 (12.05 per match)

The 1969–70 Roller Hockey Champions Cup was the 5th edition of the Roller Hockey Champions Cup organized by CERH.

Reus Deportiu achieved their fourth consecutive title.

== Teams ==
The champions of the main European leagues, and Reus Deportiu as title holders, played this competition, consisting in a double-legged knockout tournament. As Reus Deportiu was also the Spanish league champions, Voltregà also joined the tournament.

== Bracket ==
First round
(Italy) Novara | 3 | 10 | 13
(Switzerland) Montreux | 1 | 4 | 5
(Spain) Voltregà | 26 | 9 | 35
(Belgium) Royal Sunday | 6 | 4 | 10
(East Germany) SV Granschütz | 0 | – | —
(England) Bury St Edmunds | 5 | w.o. | —
(France) Gujan-Mestras | 4 | 4 | 8
(Netherlands) Residentie | 2 | 4 | 6

Quarterfinals
(Germany) Remscheid | 2 | 5 | 7
(Portugal) Porto | 10 | 8 | 18
(Italy) Novara | 6 | 2 | 8
(Spain) Voltregà | 4 | 9 | 13
(England) Bury St Edmunds | 3 | 3 | 6
(France) Gujan-Mestras | 3 | 4 | 7

Semifinals
(Portugal) Porto | 5 | 4 | 9
(Spain) Reus Deportiu | 3 | 9 | 12
(France) Gujan-Mestras | 7 | 4 | 11
(Spain) Voltregà | 14 | 11 | 25

Final
(Spain) Reus Deportiu | 12 | 6 | 18
(Spain) Voltregà | 5 | 8 | 13
