= 2000–01 CERH European League =

Tournament details
- Teams: 17

Final positions
- Champions: Barcelona (14th title)
- Runners-up: Liceo

The 2000–01 CERH European League was the 36th edition of the CERH European League organized by CERH. Its Final Four was held on 28 and 29 April 2001 in Seville, Spain.

== Preliminary round ==
Team 1	Agg.	Team 2	1st leg	2nd leg
Bassano (Italy)	25–5	(France) Vaulx-en-Velin	11–2	14–3
Dornbirn (Austria)	1–31	(Spain) Reus Deportiu	1–14	0–17

== First round ==
Team 1	Agg.	Team 2	1st leg	2nd leg
Porto (Portugal)	26–4	(England) Herne Bay	13–2	14–2
Quévert (France)	5–15	(Portugal) Barcelos	2–6	3–9
Reus Deportiu (Spain)	3–5	(Spain) Barcelona	0–0	3–5
Bassano (Italy)	5–13	(Italy) Novara	0–5	5–8
Igualada (Spain)	9–4	(Italy) Prato	6–3	3–1
Uttigen (Switzerland)	5–16	(Switzerland) Thunerstern	1–8	4–8
Genève (Switzerland)	4–15	(Portugal) Benfica	2–7	2–8
Saint-Omer (France)	1–18	(Spain) Liceo	0–12	1–6

== Group stage ==
In each group, teams played against each other home-and-away in a home-and-away round-robin format.

The two first qualified teams advanced to the Final Four.

=== Group A ===
Pos	Team	Pld	W	D	L	GF	GA	GD	Pts	Qualification	BCS	BEN	IGU	POR
1	(Portugal) Barcelos	6	4	0	2	21	17	+4	8	Advance to Final Four	—	4–1	2–0	4–1
2	(Portugal) Benfica	6	2	2	2	22	23	−1	6	Advance to Final Four	4–7	—	2–0	7–4
3	(Spain) Igualada	6	2	1	3	16	13	+3	5		7–1	3–3	—	6–2
4	(Portugal) Porto	6	2	1	3	19	25	−6	5		4–3	5–5	3–0	—

=== Group B ===
Pos	Team	Pld	W	D	L	GF	GA	GD	Pts	Qualification	LIC	BAR	NOV	THU
1	(Spain) Liceo	6	3	3	0	28	16	+12	9	Advance to Final Four	—	3–3	2–2	11–3
2	(Spain) Barcelona	6	3	2	1	30	7	+23	8	Advance to Final Four	2–2	—	5–1	10–0
3	(Italy) Novara	6	3	1	2	22	17	+5	7		3–6	1–0	—	9–1
4	(Switzerland) Thunerstern	6	0	0	6	10	50	−40	0		3–4	0–10	3–6	—

== Final four ==
The Final Four was played in the Palacio de Deportes de San Pablo, Seville, Spain.

Barcelona achieved its 14th title.

=== Bracket ===
Semifinals
28 April
(Portugal) Benfica	3 (3)
(Spain) Liceo	3 (4)
28 April
(Portugal) Barcelos	3 (5)
(Spain) Barcelona	3 (6)

Final
29 April
(Spain) Liceo	1 (2)
(Spain) Barcelona	1 (4)
Third place
29 April
(Portugal) Benfica	2
(Portugal) Barcelos	6
