= 1994–95 Roller Hockey Champions Cup =

1994–95 Champions Cup
Tournament details
- Teams: 9

Final positions
- Champions: Igualada (3rd title)
- Runners-up: Benfica

Tournament statistics
- Matches played: 16
- Goals scored: 209 (13.06 per match)

The 1994–95 Roller Hockey Champions Cup was the 30th edition of the Roller Hockey Champions Cup organized by CERH.

Igualada won its third consecutive title.

== Teams ==
The champions of the main European leagues played this competition, consisting in a double-legged knockout tournament.

As Igualada, champion of the Spanish League, is the title holder, runners-up Barcelona achieved the place representing the Spanish league.

== Bracket ==
First round
(Spain) Barcelona	4	10	14
(Switzerland) Thunerstern	0	0	0

Quarterfinals
(Spain) Barcelona	5	0	5
(Portugal) Benfica	1	8	9
(England) Herne Bay	2	3	5
(Italy) Novara	29	20	49
(Spain) Igualada	15	6	21
(France) Saint-Omer	1	4	5
(Austria) Villach	3	5	8
(Germany) Remscheid	10	14	24

Semifinals
(Portugal) Benfica	5	5	10
(Italy) Novara	1	7	8
(Spain) Igualada	20	16	36
(Germany) Remscheid	2	3	5

Final
(Portugal) Benfica	4	1	5
(Spain) Igualada	3	3	6
