= 2007–08 CERS Cup =

Tournament details
- Dates: 20 October 2007 – 20 April 2008
- Teams: 25 (from 8 associations)

Final positions
- Champions: (Spain) Tenerife (1st title)
- Runners-up: (Italy) Valdagno

The 2007–08 CERS Cup was the 28th season of the CERS Cup, Europe's second club roller hockey competition organized by CERH. 27 teams from eight national associations qualified for the competition as a result of their respective national league placing in the previous season. Following a preliminary phase and two knockout rounds, Tenerife won the tournament in the Final Four, that was played in Dinan, France.

Tenerife achieved their first title ever.

== Preliminary phase ==
Team 1	Agg.	Team 2	1st leg	2nd leg
Coutras (France)	16–4	(Austria) Wolfurt	8–2	8–2
Weil (Switzerland)	3–16	(Spain) Voltregà	1–10	2–6
Dornbirn (Austria)	1–10	(Switzerland) Uttigen	0–5	1–5
Thunerstern (Switzerland)	9–10	(Germany) Iserlohn	4–3	5–7
Blanes (Spain)	17–4	(Germany) Walsum	10–1	7–3
Germania Herringen (Germany)	2–9	(Portugal) Portosantense	1–1	1–8
Bury St. Edmunds (England)	5–28	(Italy) Viareggio	1–13	4–15
Breganze (Italy)	3–5	(Switzerland) Genève	2–1	1–4
Lloret (Spain)	9–6	(Italy) Trissino	6–1	3–5

== Knockout stage ==
The knockout stage consisted in double-legged series for the round of 16 and the quarterfinals, where the four winners would join the Final Four, that was played in Dinan, France.

Round of 16
(France) Coutras	4	4	8
(Switzerland) Genève	3	7	10
(Spain) Lloret	4	3	7
(Italy) Viareggio	0	2	2
(Portugal) Portosantense	13	6	19
(Germany) Iserlohn	0	2	2
(Italy) Valdagno	7	4	11
(France) Saint-Omer	2	4	6
(France) Mérignac	2	4	6
(Italy) Novara	7	6	13
(France) Ploufragan	2	1	3
(Spain) Blanes	8	6	14
(France) La Vendéenne	5	4	9
(Switzerland) Uttigen	6	2	8
(Spain) Tenerife	2	2	4
(Spain) Voltregà	0	3	3

Quarter-finals
(Switzerland) Genève	1	3	4
(Spain) Lloret	3	7	10
(Portugal) Portosantense	2	3	5
(Italy) Valdagno	3	4	7
(Italy) Novara	1	3	4
(Spain) Blanes	2	6	8
(France) La Vendéenne	0	0	0
(Spain) Tenerife	2	4	6

Semi-finals
(Spain) Lloret	2
(Italy) Valdagno	6
(Spain) Blanes	3
(Spain) Tenerife	5

Final
(Italy) Valdagno	4 (1)
(Spain) Tenerife	4 (2)

2008 CERS Cup winners
(Spain)
Tenerife
First title

== See also ==
- 2006–07 CERH European League
- 2008 CERH Women's European Cup
