= 2008–09 CERH European League =

Tournament details
- Teams: 16 (group stage); 8 (final)

Final positions
- Champions: Reus Deportiu (7th title)
- Runners-up: Club Patí Vic

The 2008–09 CERH European League was the 44th edition of the CERH European League organized by CERH. Its Final Eight was held in May 2009 in Bassano del Grappa, Italy.

== Group stage ==
In each group, teams played against each other home-and-away in a home-and-away round-robin format.

The group winners and runners-up advanced to the final eight.

=== Group A ===
Pos	Team	Pld	W	D	L	GF	GA	GD	Pts	Qualification	BAR	VIC	VAL	ISE
1	(Spain) Barcelona	6	4	1	1	20	9	+11	13	Advance to Final Eight	—	2–3	2–1	4–0
2	(Spain) Vic	6	4	0	2	25	15	+10	12	Advance to Final Eight	1–3	—	3–2	9–2
3	(Italy) Valdagno	6	3	1	2	23	12	+11	10		2–2	4–3	—	4–2
4	(Germany) Iserlohn	6	0	0	6	8	40	−32	0		2–7	2–6	0–10	—

Source: OKCat.cat

=== Group B ===
Pos	Team	Pld	W	D	L	GF	GA	GD	Pts	Qualification	NOI	POR	IGU	QUE
1	(Spain) Noia	6	4	1	1	22	16	+6	13	Advance to Final Eight	—	3–2	6–4	5–1
2	(Portugal) Porto	6	3	2	1	33	12	+21	11	Advance to Final Eight	4–4	—	3–1	10–0
3	(Spain) Igualada	6	3	1	2	24	17	+7	10		4–1	3–3	—	8–1
4	(France) Quévert	6	0	0	6	7	41	−34	0		1–3	1–11	3–4	—

Source: OKCat.cat

=== Group C ===
Pos	Team	Pld	W	D	L	GF	GA	GD	Pts	Qualification	REU	BAS	TEN	HER
1	(Spain) Reus	6	4	2	0	35	13	+22	14	Advance to Final Eight	—	2–2	4–3	17–0
2	(Italy) Bassano	6	3	2	1	50	10	+40	11	Advance to Final Eight	3–3	—	3–2	19–0
3	(Spain) Tenerife	6	3	0	3	38	12	+26	9		1–2	3–2	—	19–1
4	(England) Herne Bay United	6	0	0	6	5	93	−88	0		4–7	0–21	0–10	—

Source: OKCat.cat

=== Group D ===
Pos	Team	Pld	W	D	L	GF	GA	GD	Pts	Qualification	LIC	FOL	VIL	BAR
1	(Spain) Liceo	6	4	0	2	17	10	+7	12	Advance to Final Eight	—	1–0	2–0	6–0
2	(Italy) Follonica	6	4	1	1	19	11	+8	13	Advance to Final Eight	4–3	—	3–3	5–2
3	(Spain) Vilanova	6	2	1	3	12	14	−2	7		4–0	1–5	—	1–3
4	(Portugal) Barcelos	6	1	0	5	9	22	−13	3		2–5	1–2	1–3	—

Source: OKCat.cat

== Final eight ==
The final eight was played at PalaBassano, in Bassano del Grappa, Italy.

Reus Deportiu finally conquered its seventh title, 37 years after their last win.

=== Bracket ===
Quarterfinals
30 April
(Spain) Reus Deportiu	2 (4)
(Spain) Barcelona	2 (3)
1 May
(Portugal) Porto	2
(Italy) Bassano	3
30 April
(Spain) Liceo	5
(Spain) Noia	2
1 May
(Spain) Roncato Vic	3 (4)
(Italy) Follonica	3 (3)

Semifinals
2 May
(Spain) Reus Deportiu	7
(Italy) Bassano	1
2 May
(Spain) Vic	4
(Spain) Liceo	1

Final
3 May
(Spain) Reus Deportiu	2 (4)
(Spain) Vic	2 (3)
