= 1968–69 Roller Hockey Champions Cup =

1968–69 Champions Cup
Tournament details
- Teams: 7

Final positions
- Champions: Reus Deportiu (3rd title)
- Runners-up: Benfica

Tournament statistics
- Matches played: 11
- Goals scored: 81 (7.36 per match)

The 1968–69 Roller Hockey Champions Cup was the 4th edition of the Roller Hockey Champions Cup organized by CERH.

Reus Deportiu achieved their third consecutive title.

== Teams ==
The champions of the main European leagues, and Reus Deportiu as title holders, played this competition, consisting in a double-legged knockout tournament. As Reus Deportiu was also the Spanish league champions, Vilanova also joined the tournament.

== Bracket ==
Quarterfinals
(France) Coutras	5	2	7
(Portugal) Benfica	9	7	16
(Spain) Vilanova	6	4	10
(Italy) Monza	0	5	5
(Germany) Remscheid	5	w.o.	—
(Switzerland) RS Zürich	0	–	—

Semifinals
(Portugal) Benfica	1	2	3
(Spain) Vilanova	0	2	2
(Spain) Reus Deportiu	8	9	17
(Germany) Remscheid	2	3	5

Final
(Spain) Reus Deportiu	7	0	7
(Portugal) Benfica	1	3	4
