= 1978–79 Roller Hockey Champions Cup =

1978–79 Champions Cup
Tournament details
- Teams: 10

Final positions
- Champions: Barcelona (4th title)
- Runners-up: Reus Deportiu

Tournament statistics
- Matches played: 18
- Goals scored: 197 (10.94 per match)

The 1978–79 Roller Hockey Champions Cup was the 14th edition of the Roller Hockey Champions Cup organized by CERH.

Barcelona achieved their fourth title.

== Teams ==
The champions of the main European leagues, and Barcelona as title holders, played this competition, consisting in a double-legged knockout tournament. As Barcelona qualified also as Spanish champion, Reus Deportiu joined also the competition.

== Bracket ==
First round
(Italy) Trissino	5	6	11
(Germany) Remscheid	6	7	13
(England) Middlesbrough	6	2	8
(France) La Vendéenne	22	9	31

Quarterfinals
(Belgium) Royal Sunday	9	4	13
(Switzerland) RS Zürich	1	6	7
(Spain) Reus Deportiu	11	3	14
(Germany) Remscheid	0	2	2
(Netherlands) Lichtstad	2	2	4
(Portugal) Sporting CP	2	5	7
(France) La Vendéenne	4	3	7
(Spain) Barcelona	7	14	21

Semifinals
(Belgium) Royal Sunday	2	3	5
(Spain) Reus Deportiu	4	10	14
(Portugal) Sporting CP	5	5	10
(Spain) Barcelona	10	5	15

Final
(Spain) Reus Deportiu	3	2	5
(Spain) Barcelona	1	6	7
