= 1990–91 Roller Hockey Champions Cup =

1990–91 Champions Cup
Tournament details
- Teams: 9

Final positions
- Champions: Barcelos (1st title)
- Runners-up: Monza

Tournament statistics
- Matches played: 16
- Goals scored: 190 (11.88 per match)

The 1990–91 Roller Hockey Champions Cup was the 27th edition of the Roller Hockey Champions Cup organized by CERH.

Barcelos achieved their first title ever.

== Teams ==
The champions of the main European leagues and Porto, as title holder, played this competition, consisting in a double-legged knockout tournament.

== Bracket ==
First round
(Germany) Walsum	2	4	6
(Portugal) Barcelos	13	16	29

Quarterfinals
(Portugal) Barcelos	4	5	9
(Portugal) Porto	4	4	8
(Belgium) Kurink	6	2	8
(France) La Vendéenne	4	5	9
(Spain) Liceo	4	2	6
(Italy) Monza	5	3	8
(Netherlands) Dennenberg	7	1	8
(Switzerland) Thunerstern	10	11	21

Semifinals
(Portugal) Barcelos	22	23	45
(France) La Vendéenne	3	0	3
(Italy) Monza	11	3	14
(Switzerland) Thunerstern	2	1	3

Final
(Portugal) Barcelos (a.e.t.)	4	4	8
(Italy) Monza	4	3	7
