= 1977–78 Roller Hockey Champions Cup =

1977–78 Champions Cup
Tournament details
- Teams: 10

Final positions
- Champions: Barcelona (3rd title)
- Runners-up: Royal Sunday

Tournament statistics
- Matches played: 18
- Goals scored: 162 (9 per match)

The 1977–78 Roller Hockey Champions Cup was the 13th edition of the Roller Hockey Champions Cup organized by CERH.

Barcelona achieved their third title.

== Teams ==
The champions of the main European leagues, and Sporting CP as title holders, played this competition, consisting in a double-legged knockout tournament. As Sporting CP qualified also as Spanish champion, Valongo joined also the competition.

== Bracket ==
First round
(Spain) Barcelona	8	4	12
(Italy) Novara	1	0	1
(Belgium) Royal Sunday	9	11	20
(England) Wolverhampton	4	5	9

Quarterfinals
(Portugal) Sporting CP	2	2	4
(Spain) Barcelona	5	5	10
(Portugal) Valongo	6	6	12
(Germany) Iserlohn	7	3	10
(Switzerland) RS Zürich	2	2	4
(Belgium) Royal Sunday	2	7	9
(Netherlands) Lichtstad	6	3	9
(France) Coutras (0–1 p)	3	6	9

Semifinals
(Spain) Barcelona	8	3	11
(Portugal) Valongo	0	5	5
(Belgium) Royal Sunday	6	8	14
(France) Coutras	4	3	7

Final
(Spain) Barcelona	8	5	13
(Belgium) Royal Sunday	2	1	3
