= 1985–86 Roller Hockey Champions Cup =

1985–86 Champions Cup
Tournament details
- Teams: 9

Final positions
- Champions: Porto (1st title)
- Runners-up: Novara

Tournament statistics
- Matches played: 16
- Goals scored: 166 (10.38 per match)

The 1985–86 Roller Hockey Champions Cup was the 21st edition of the Roller Hockey Champions Cup organized by CERH.

Porto achieved their first title ever.

== Teams ==
The champions of the main European leagues played this competition, consisting of a double-legged knockout tournament. As Spanish champions, Barcelona qualified as title holder with Liceo also admitted as the Spanish representative.

== Bracket ==
First round
(Germany) Walsum	4	6	10
(Netherlands) Residentie	6	6	12

Quarterfinals
(Switzerland) Basel	1	3	4
(Spain) Barcelona	2	12	14
(Netherlands) Residentie	6	5	11
(Portugal) Porto	10	4	14
(France) Coutras	5	3	8
(England) Southsea	3	2	5
(Spain) Liceo	6	1	7
(Italy) Novara	7	5	12

Semifinals
(Spain) Barcelona	5	3	8
(Portugal) Porto	5	6	11
(France) Coutras	1	1	2
(Italy) Novara	6	13	19

Final
(Portugal) Porto	5	7	12
(Italy) Novara	3	5	8
