= 1974–75 Roller Hockey Champions Cup =

1974–75 Champions Cup
Tournament details
- Teams: 9

Final positions
- Champions: Voltregà (2nd title)
- Runners-up: Barcelona

Tournament statistics
- Matches played: 16
- Goals scored: 221 (13.81 per match)

The 1974–75 Roller Hockey Champions Cup was the 10th edition of the Roller Hockey Champions Cup organized by CERH.

Voltregà achieved their second title.

== Teams ==
The champions of the main European leagues, and Barcelona as title holders, played this competition, consisting in a double-legged knockout tournament. As Barcelona qualified also as Spanish champion, Voltregà joined also the competition.

== Bracket ==
First round
(Netherlands) Lichtstad	5	2	7
(Spain) Voltregà	4	11	15

Quarterfinals
(Switzerland) RS Zürich	3	2	5
(Spain) Barcelona	11	25	36
(Belgium) Royal Sunday	7	2	9
(Spain) Voltregà	9	11	20
(Germany) Walsum	4	0	4
(Portugal) Benfica	3	8	11
(Italy) Novara	13	9	22
(France) Coutras	4	7	11

Semifinals
(Spain) Barcelona	5	6	11
(Italy) Novara	4	5	9
(Portugal) Benfica	3	7	10
(Spain) Voltregà	7	15	22

Final
(Spain) Voltregà	5	6	11
(Spain) Barcelona	5	4	9
