= 1970–71 Roller Hockey Champions Cup =

1970–71 Champions Cup
Tournament details
- Teams: 9

Final positions
- Champions: Reus Deportiu (5th title)
- Runners-up: Novara

Tournament statistics
- Matches played: 16
- Goals scored: 188 (11.75 per match)

The 1970–71 Roller Hockey Champions Cup was the 6th edition of the Roller Hockey Champions Cup organized by CERH.

Reus Deportiu achieved their fifth consecutive title.

== Teams ==
The champions of the main European leagues, and Reus Deportiu as title holders, played this competition, consisting in a double-legged knockout tournament. As Reus Deportiu was also the Spanish league champions, Voltregà also joined the tournament.

== Bracket ==
First round
(Italy) Novara	10	5	15
(Germany) Herten	4	4	8
(France) Coutras	4	3	7
(Belgium) Royal Sunday	6	10	16
(Switzerland) RS Zürich	2	3	5
(Netherlands) Lichtstad	2	12	14
(Portugal) Benfica (3–0 p)	8	5	13
(Spain) Voltregà	5	8	13

Quarterfinals
(Italy) Novara	12	9	21
(Belgium) Royal Sunday	5	2	7
(Netherlands) Lichtstad	3	2	5
(Spain) Reus Deportiu	6	12	18
(Portugal) Benfica

Semifinals
(Italy) Novara
(Spain) Reus Deportiu	8	4	12
(Portugal) Benfica	4	3	7

Final
(Italy) Novara	7	4	11
(Spain) Reus Deportiu	7	9	16
