= 1988–89 Roller Hockey Champions Cup =

1988–89 Champions Cup
Tournament details
- Teams: 8

Final positions
- Champions: Noia (1st title)
- Runners-up: Sporting CP

Tournament statistics
- Matches played: 14
- Goals scored: 144 (10.29 per match)

The 1988–89 Roller Hockey Champions Cup was the 25th edition of the Roller Hockey Champions Cup organized by CERH.

Noia achieved their first title ever.

== Teams ==
The champions of the main European leagues and Liceo, as title holder, played this competition, consisting in a double-legged knockout tournament.

== Bracket ==
Quarterfinals
(Portugal) Sporting CP	12	9	21
(Belgium) Kurink	2	3	5
(France) Gujan-Mestras	0	5	5
(Germany) Darmstadt	5	11	16
(Spain) Liceo	1	3	4
(Spain) Noia	7	11	18
(Switzerland) Thunerstern	3	5	8
(Italy) Novara	4	13	17

Semifinals
(Portugal) Sporting CP	8	6	14
(Germany) Darmstadt	1	3	4
(Spain) Noia	5	4	9
(Italy) Novara	4	4	8

Final
(Portugal) Sporting CP	4	1	5
(Spain) Noia	7	3	10
