= 1984–85 Roller Hockey Champions Cup =

1984–85 Champions Cup
Tournament details
- Teams: 10

Final positions
- Champions: Barcelona (10th title)
- Runners-up: Porto

Tournament statistics
- Matches played: 18
- Goals scored: 204 (11.33 per match)

The 1985–86 Roller Hockey Champions Cup was the 20th edition of the Roller Hockey Champions Cup organized by CERH.

Barcelona achieved their tenth title ever.

== Teams ==
The champions of the main European leagues played this competition, consisting in a double-legged knockout tournament. As Spanish champions Barcelona qualified as title holder, Tordera was also admitted as the Spanish representative.

== Bracket ==
First round
(Belgium) Royal Sunday	8	10	18
(Switzerland) Montreux	10	6	16
(Germany) Cronenberg	3	2	5
(Spain) Tordera	5	6	11

Quarterfinals
(Netherlands) Lichtstad	11	4	15
(France) Coutras	1	2	3
(Portugal) Porto	12	9	21
(Belgium) Royal Sunday	3	4	7
(Italy) Amatori Vercelli	6	2	8
(Spain) Tordera	4	5	9
(England) Southsea	2	5	7
(Spain) Barcelona	9	12	21

Semifinals
(Netherlands) Lichtstad	4	1	5
(Portugal) Porto	4	7	11
(Spain) Tordera	5	6	11
(Spain) Barcelona	7	10	17

Final
(Portugal) Porto	5	4	9
(Spain) Barcelona	4	6	10
