= 1982–83 Roller Hockey Champions Cup =

1982–83 Champions Cup
Tournament details
- Teams: 9

Final positions
- Champions: Barcelona (8th title)
- Runners-up: Sentmenat

Tournament statistics
- Matches played: 16
- Goals scored: 201 (12.56 per match)

The 1982–83 Roller Hockey Champions Cup was the 17th edition of the Roller Hockey Champions Cup organized by CERH.

Barcelona achieved their eighth title.

== Teams ==
The champions of the main European leagues, and Barcelona as title holders, played this competition, consisting in a double-legged knockout tournament. As Barcelona qualified also as Spanish champion, Sentmenat joined also the competition.

== Bracket ==
First round
(Switzerland) Montreux	2	8	10
(Portugal) Sporting CP	8	20	28

Quarterfinals
(France) La Vendéenne	4	5	9
(Spain) Sentmenat	6	14	20
(Germany) Cronenberg	26	17	43
(England) Southsea	2	2	4
(Italy) Reggiana	2	2	4
(Portugal) Sporting CP	5	3	8
(Netherlands) Dennenberg	2	3	5
(Spain) Barcelona	4	10	14

Semifinals
(Spain) Sentmenat	6	1	7
(Germany) Cronenberg	3	2	5
(Portugal) Sporting CP	1	4	5
(Spain) Barcelona	0	9	9

Final
(Spain) Sentmenat	1	6	7
(Spain) Barcelona	9	14	23
