= Gonzalo Romero (roller hockey) =

Argentinian roller hockey player

Personal information
- Full name: Gonzalo Miguel Romero López
- Born: 9 September 1992 (age 33) Mendoza, Argentina
- Years active: 2011–

Sport
- Country: Argentina
- Sport: Roller hockey
- Team: (Argentina) AS San Juan (2011–2012) (Italy) Novara (2012) (Argentina) Richet y Zapata (2012–2015) (Italy) Forte dei Marmi (2016–2018) (Portugal) Sporting CP (2018–)

Gonzalo Miguel Romero López (born 9 September 1992), in San Juan, is a professional roller hockey player who plays for Sporting CP.
