= 1966–67 Roller Hockey Champions Cup =

1966–67 Champions Cup
Tournament details
- Teams: 7

Final positions
- Champions: Reus Deportiu (1st title)
- Runners-up: Monza

Tournament statistics
- Matches played: 12
- Goals scored: 77 (6.42 per match)

The 1966–67 Roller Hockey Champions Cup was the 2nd edition of the Roller Hockey Champions Cup organized by CERH.

Reus Deportiu achieved their first title ever.

== Teams ==
The champions of the main European leagues, and Voltregà as title holders, played this competition, consisting in a double-legged knockout tournament.

== Bracket ==
Quarterfinals
(Switzerland) Montreux	3	0	3
(Italy) Monza	3	3	6
(France) Coutras	5	5	10
(Germany) Herten	4	4	8
(Spain) Reus Deportiu	3	4	7
(Portugal) Fabril	1	0	1

Semifinals
(Italy) Monza	5	3	8
(France) Coutras	2	3	5
(Spain) Reus Deportiu	6	3	9
(Spain) Voltregà	4	1	5

Final
(Italy) Monza	3	3	6
(Spain) Reus Deportiu	3	6	9
