= 1981–82 Roller Hockey Champions Cup =

1981–82 Champions Cup
Tournament details
- Teams: 10

Final positions
- Champions: Barcelona (7th title)
- Runners-up: Amatori Lodi

Tournament statistics
- Matches played: 18
- Goals scored: 171 (9.5 per match)

The 1981–82 Roller Hockey Champions Cup was the 17th edition of the Roller Hockey Champions Cup organized by CERH.

Barcelona achieved their seventh title.

== Teams ==
The champions of the main European leagues, and Barcelona as title holders, played this competition, consisting in a double-legged knockout tournament. As Barcelona qualified also as Spanish champion, Noia joined also the competition.

== Bracket ==
First round
(Spain) Noia	7	3	10
(France) Gujan-Mestras	1	4	5
(Italy) Amatori Lodi	17	7	24
(England) Sothsea	0	0	0

Quarterfinals
(Spain) Barcelona	10	4	14
(Germany) Walsum	4	2	6
(Belgium) Royal Sunday	0	4	4
(Portugal) Benfica	4	15	19
(Switzerland) Vevey	3	6	9
(Spain) Noia	6	12	18
(Netherlands) Lichtstad	3	1	4
(Italy) Amatori Lodi	2	8	10

Semifinals
(Spain) Barcelona	11	2	13
(Portugal) Benfica	2	4	6
(Spain) Noia	4	4	8
(Italy) Amatori Lodi	3	8	11

Final
(Spain) Barcelona	4	6	10
(Italy) Amatori Lodi	1	4	5
