= 2012 CERH European League Final Eight =

2011-12 CERH European League
Tournament details
- Host country: Italy
- Dates: 24–27 May
- Teams: 8

Final positions
- Champions: HC Coinasa Liceo
- Runners-up: Barcelona Sorli Discau

Tournament statistics
- Matches played: 7
- Goals scored: 55 (7.86 per match)
- Top scorer(s): de Oro, Tataranni, 5

The 2012 CERH European League Final Eight was the 47th edition of the CERH European League organized by CERH. It was held in May 2012 in Lodi, Italy.

== Arena ==
The arena that hosted the Final Eight - PalaCastellotti is the biggest multi-arena in Lodi. The seating capacity of the arena is 2600.

== Competition ==
=== Bracket ===
Quarter-finals
24 May - PalaCastellotti
Oliveirense | 2
Barcelona Sorli Discau | 6
24 May - PalaCastellotti
Tecnol Reus | 3
Amatori Lodi | 1
25 May - PalaCastellotti
Candelária | 2
Coinasa Liceo | 4
25 May - PalaCastellotti
Benfica | 5
Isello Hockey Valdagno | 11

Semi-finals
26 May - PalaCastellotti
Barcelona Sorli Discau | 5
Tecnol Reus | 2
26 May - PalaCastellotti
Isello Hockey Valdagno | 3
Coinasa Liceo | 5

Final
27 May - PalaCastellotti
Barcelona Sorli Discau | 2
Coinasa Liceo | 4

=== Results ===
==== Quarterfinals ====
May 24, 2012; 20:00 CEST
| May 24, 2012; 20:00 CEST | Oliveirense | 2 – 6 | Barcelona Sorli Discau | PalaCastellotti, Lodi |
| May 24, 2012; 20:00 CEST | Silva (2) | Report | Torra (2), Pablo Álvarez (2), Panadero (1), García (1) | PalaCastellotti, Lodi |
| | Umpires: Bisacco, Corponi (ITA) |

May 24, 2012; 22:00 CEST
| May 24, 2012; 22:00 CEST | Tecnol Reus | 3 – 1 | Amatori Lodi | PalaCastellotti, Lodi |
| May 24, 2012; 22:00 CEST | Caldú (1); Marín (1); Adroher (1) | Report | Festa (1) | PalaCastellotti, Lodi |
| | Umpires: Monteiro, Pinto (POR) |

May 25, 2012; 19:15 CEST
| May 25, 2012; 19:15 CEST | Candelária | 2 – 4 | Coinasa Liceo | PalaCastellotti, Lodi |
| May 25, 2012; 19:15 CEST | Fernández (1); Silva (1) | Report | Bargalló (2); Pascual (1); Barreiros (1) | PalaCastellotti, Lodi |
| | Umpires: Corponi, Bissaco (ITA) |

May 25, 2012; 21:15 CEST
| May 25, 2012; 21:15 CEST | Benfica | 5 – 11 | Isello Hockey Valdagno | PalaCastellotti, Lodi |
| May 25, 2012; 21:15 CEST | Viana (2); Silva (1); López (1); Rodrigues (1) | Report | de Oro (5); Tataranni (4); Nicolia (1); Rossi (1) | PalaCastellotti, Lodi |
| | Umpires: García, Valverde (ESP) |

==== Semifinals ====
May 26, 2012; 18:00 CEST
| May 26, 2012; 18:00 CEST | Barcelona Sorli Discau | 5 – 2 | Tecnol Reus | PalaCastellotti, Lodi |
| May 26, 2012; 18:00 CEST | Pablo Álvarez (2); Gual (1); Ordeig (1); García (1) | Report | Casanovas (1); Marín (1) | PalaCastellotti, Lodi |
| | Umpires: Bissaco, Corponi (ITA) |

May 26, 2012; 20:00 CEST
| May 26, 2012; 20:00 CEST | Isello Hockey Valdagno | 3 – 5 | Coinasa Liceo | PalaCastellotti, Lodi |
| May 26, 2012; 20:00 CEST | Nicolia (2); Tataranni (1) | Report | Lamas (1); Pascual (1); Miras (1); Pérez (1); Barreiros (1) | PalaCastellotti, Lodi |
| | Umpires: Pinto, Monteiro (POR) |

==== Final ====
May 27, 2012; 17:45 CEST
| May 27, 2012; 17:45 CEST | Barcelona Sorli Discau | 2 – 4 | Coinasa Liceo | PalaCastellotti, Lodi |
| May 27, 2012; 17:45 CEST | Gual (1); García (1) | Report | Bargalló (2); Lamas (1); Barreiros (1) | PalaCastellotti, Lodi |
| | Umpires: Pinto, Monteiro (POR) |

2012 CERH European League winners
(Spain)
HC Coinasa Liceo
Sixth title

== See also ==
- 2012 CERS Cup Final Four
