= 1992–93 Roller Hockey Champions Cup =

1992–93 Champions Cup
Tournament details
- Teams: 10

Final positions
- Champions: Igualada (1st title)
- Runners-up: Benfica

Tournament statistics
- Matches played: 18
- Goals scored: 230 (12.78 per match)

The 1992–93 Roller Hockey Champions Cup was the 29th edition of the Roller Hockey Champions Cup organized by CERH.

Igualada won their first title ever.

== Teams ==
The champions of the main European leagues and Liceo, as title holder, played this competition, consisting in a double-legged knockout tournament.

== Bracket ==
First round
(Germany) Remscheid	24	19	43
(Austria) Villach	2	2	4
(Switzerland) Genève	3	0	3
(Italy) Monza	4	9	13

Quarterfinals
(Netherlands) RC Lichtstad	4	0	4
(Spain) Igualada	13	21	34
(Germany) IGR Remscheid	7	6	13
(France) Saint-Omer	6	1	7
(Spain) Liceo	20	14	34
(Belgium) Kurink	5	4	9
(Portugal) Benfica	6	2	8
(Italy) Monza	2	1	3

Semifinals
(Spain) Igualada	12	8	20
(Germany) Remscheid	1	2	3
(Spain) Liceo	3	4	7
(Portugal) Benfica	3	5	8

Final
(Spain) Igualada	4	8	12
(Portugal) Benfica	1	3	4
