= 1965–66 Roller Hockey Champions Cup =

1965–66 Champions Cup
Tournament details
- Teams: 4

Final positions
- Champions: Voltregà (1st title)
- Runners-up: Monza

Tournament statistics
- Matches played: 6
- Goals scored: 51 (8.5 per match)

The 1965–66 Roller Hockey Champions Cup was the first edition of the Roller Hockey Champions Cup organized by CERH.

Voltregà was the first team to win this tournament.

== Teams ==
The champions of the main European leagues played this competition, consisting in a double-legged knockout tournament.

== Bracket ==
Semifinals
(Germany) Herten	3	0	3
(Italy) Monza	6	5	11
(Spain) Voltregà	13	9	22
(Spain) Reus Deportiu	2	1	3

Final
(Italy) Monza	2	1	3
(Spain) Voltregà	6	3	9
