= 1995–96 Roller Hockey Champions Cup =

1995–96 Champions Cup
Tournament details
- Teams: 9

Final positions
- Champions: Igualada (4th title)
- Runners-up: Barcelona

Tournament statistics
- Matches played: 16
- Goals scored: 167 (10.44 per match)

The 1995–96 Roller Hockey Champions Cup was the 31st edition of the Roller Hockey Champions Cup organized by CERH.

Igualada won its fourth consecutive title.

== Teams ==
The champions of the main European leagues played this competition, consisting in a double-legged knockout tournament.

As Igualada, champion of the Spanish League, is the title holder, runners-up Barcelona achieved the place representing the Spanish league.

== Bracket ==
First round
(Switzerland) Genève	9	6	15
(Netherlands) Agor Dordrecht	0	3	3

Quarterfinals
(Germany) Weil	11	10	21
(Austria) Wolfurt	2	0	2
(Switzerland) Genève	0	0	0
(Spain) Igualada	5	8	13
(France) Nantes	5	2	7
(Portugal) Benfica	8	21	29
(Italy) Novara	2	2	4
(Spain) Barcelona	1	5	6

Semifinals
(Germany) Weil	3	3	6
(Spain) Igualada	6	18	24
(Portugal) Benfica	3	1	4
(Spain) Barcelona	1	4	5

Final
(Spain) Igualada (a)	0	2	2
(Spain) Barcelona	0	2	2
