= 1979–80 Roller Hockey Champions Cup =

1979–80 Champions Cup
Tournament details
- Teams: 10

Final positions
- Champions: Barcelona (5th title)
- Runners-up: Benfica

Tournament statistics
- Matches played: 18
- Goals scored: 175 (9.72 per match)

The 1979–80 Roller Hockey Champions Cup was the 15th edition of the Roller Hockey Champions Cup organized by CERH.

Barcelona achieved their fifth title.

== Teams ==
The champions of the main European leagues, and Barcelona as title holders, played this competition, consisting in a double-legged knockout tournament. As Barcelona qualified also as Spanish champion, Reus Deportiu joined also the competition.

== Bracket ==
First round
(Germany) Herten	12	6	18
(Belgium) Rolta	3	7	10
(Italy) Breganze	0	2	2
(Portugal) Benfica	2	1	3

Quarterfinals
(Switzerland) RC Zürich	4	2	6
(Spain) Barcelona	8	13	21
(Spain) Reus Deportiu	7	8	15
(Germany) Herten	1	0	1
(England) Middlesbrough	1	3	4
(Netherlands) Lichtstad	9	20	29
(Portugal) Benfica	13	7	20
(France) La Vendéenne	1	3	4

Semifinals
(Spain) Barcelona	5	3	8
(Spain) Reus Deportiu	0	5	5
(Netherlands) Lichtstad	3	3	6
(Portugal) Benfica	5	3	8

Final
(Spain) Barcelona	5	6	11
(Portugal) Benfica	2	3	5
