= 1967–68 Roller Hockey Champions Cup =

1967–68 Champions Cup
Tournament details
- Teams: 7

Final positions
- Champions: Reus Deportiu (2nd title)
- Runners-up: Triestina

Tournament statistics
- Matches played: 12
- Goals scored: 68 (5.67 per match)

The 1967–68 Roller Hockey Champions Cup was the 3rd edition of the Roller Hockey Champions Cup organized by CERH.

Reus Deportiu achieved their second consecutive title.

== Teams ==
The champions of the main European leagues, and Reus Deportiu as title holders, played this competition, consisting in a double-legged knockout tournament. As Reus Deportiu was also the Spanish league champions, Mataró also joined the tournament.

== Bracket ==
Quarterfinals
(Italy) Triestina	5	2	7
(France) Gujan-Mestras	0	1	1
(Germany) Hüls	2	2	4
(Netherlands) Residentie	8	11	19
(Portugal) Benfica	4	1	5
(Spain) Mataró	3	3	6

Semifinals
(Italy) Triestina	6	3	9
(Netherlands) Residentie	0	2	2
(Spain) Reus Deportiu	3	0	3
(Spain) Mataró	0	1	1

Final
(Italy) Triestina	0	2	2
(Spain) Reus Deportiu	2	6	8
