= 1975–76 Roller Hockey Champions Cup =

1975–76 Champions Cup
Tournament details
- Teams: 9

Final positions
- Champions: Voltregà (1st title)
- Runners-up: Barcelona

Tournament statistics
- Matches played: 16
- Goals scored: 184 (11.5 per match)

The 1975–76 Roller Hockey Champions Cup was the 11th edition of the Roller Hockey Champions Cup organized by CERH.

Voltregà achieved their third title.

== Teams ==
The champions of the main European leagues, and Voltregà as title holders, played this competition, consisting in a double-legged knockout tournament. As Voltregà qualified also as Spanish champion, Barcelona joined also the competition.

== Bracket ==
First round
(Switzerland) Montreux | 7 | 2 | 9
(Portugal) Sporting CP | 21 | 22 | 43

Quarterfinals
(Germany) Walsum | 6 | 6 | 12
(Belgium) Rolta | 1 | 4 | 5
(Italy) Novara | 3 | 3 | 6
(Spain) Barcelona | 9 | 6 | 15
(Netherlands) Lichtstad | 2 | 1 | 3
(Portugal) Sporting CP | 5 | 9 | 14
(Spain) Voltregà | 14 | 9 | 23
(France) Coutras | 2 | 8 | 10

Semifinals
(Germany) Walsum | 1 | 1 | 2
(Spain) Barcelona | 5 | 6 | 11
(Portugal) Sporting CP | 5 | 6 | 11
(Spain) Voltregà | 3 | 9 | 12

Final
(Spain) Barcelona | 2 | 1 | 3
(Spain) Voltregà | 2 | 3 | 5
