= 1986–87 Roller Hockey Champions Cup =

1986–87 Champions Cup
Tournament details
- Teams: 9

Final positions
- Champions: Liceo (1st title)
- Runners-up: Porto

Tournament statistics
- Matches played: 16
- Goals scored: 159 (9.94 per match)

The 1986–87 Roller Hockey Champions Cup was the 22nd edition of the Roller Hockey Champions Cup organized by CERH.

Liceo achieved their first title ever.

== Teams ==
The champions of the main European leagues played this competition, consisting in a double-legged knockout tournament. As Portuguese champions Porto qualified as title holder, Benfica was also admitted as the Portuguese representative.

== Bracket ==
First round
(Germany) Iserlohn	2	2	4
(Netherlands) Dennenberg	9	6	15

Quarterfinals
(Netherlands) Dennenberg	12	8	20
(England) Southsea	4	0	4
(Portugal) Porto	13	3	16
(Portugal) Benfica	1	3	4
(Italy) Amatori Vercelli	11	8	19
(France) Coutras	0	3	3
(Spain) Liceo	10	13	23
(Switzerland) Montreux	1	1	2

Semifinals
(Netherlands) Dennenberg	2	2	4
(Portugal) Porto	5	11	16
(Italy) Amatori Vercelli	3	0	3
(Spain) Liceo	4	9	13

Final
(Portugal) Porto	2	3	5
(Spain) Liceo	4	4	8
