= 1993–94 Roller Hockey Champions Cup =

1993–94 Champions Cup
Tournament details
- Teams: 9

Final positions
- Champions: Igualada (2nd title)
- Runners-up: Barcelos

Tournament statistics
- Matches played: 16
- Goals scored: 234 (14.63 per match)

The 1993–94 Roller Hockey Champions Cup was the 30th edition of the Roller Hockey Champions Cup organized by CERH.

Igualada won their second consecutive title.

== Teams ==
The champions of the main European leagues and Igualada, as title holder, played this competition, consisting in a double-legged knockout tournament.

== Bracket ==
First round
(England) Herne Bay	1	3	4
(Italy) Novara	22	22	44

Quarterfinals
(Germany) Weil	23	14	37
(Austria) Villach	6	4	10
(Switzerland) Genève	4	2	6
(Portugal) Barcelos	6	13	19
(France) Saint-Omer	1	3	4
(Spain) Igualada	12	10	22
(Italy) Novara	5	7	12
(Spain) Liceo	2	2	4

Semifinals
(Germany) Weil	2	11	13
(Portugal) Barcelos	6	19	25
(Spain) Igualada	6	5	11
(Italy) Novara	2	2	4

Final
(Portugal) Barcelos	4	3	7
(Spain) Igualada	7	2	9
