= 1972–73 Roller Hockey Champions Cup =

1972–73 Champions Cup
Tournament details
- Teams: 9

Final positions
- Champions: Barcelona (1st title)
- Runners-up: Benfica

Tournament statistics
- Matches played: 16
- Goals scored: 153 (9.56 per match)

The 1972–73 Roller Hockey Champions Cup was the 8th edition of the Roller Hockey Champions Cup organized by CERH.

Barcelona achieved their first title ever.

== Teams ==
The champions of the main European leagues, and Reus Deportiu as title holders, played this competition, consisting in a double-legged knockout tournament. As Reus Deportiu was also the Spanish league champions, Barcelona also joined the tournament.

== Bracket ==
First round
(France) Coutras	3	3	6
(Switzerland) RS Zürich	3	6	9
(Italy) Novara	4	5	9
(Spain) Barcelona (2–0 p)	4	5	9
(Netherlands) Dordt	2	3	5
(Belgium) Rolta	4	7	11
(Portugal) Benfica	8	5	13
(Germany) Walsum	3	1	4

Quarterfinals
(Switzerland) RS Zürich	6	2	8
(Spain) Barcelona	4	14	18
(Belgium) Rolta	4	4	8
(Spain) Reus Deportiu	4	14	18
(Portugal) Benfica

Semifinals
(Spain) Barcelona
(Spain) Reus Deportiu	2	2	4
(Portugal) Benfica	5	2	7

Final
(Spain) Barcelona	5	7	12
(Portugal) Benfica	3	7	10
