= 1971–72 Roller Hockey Champions Cup =

1971–72 Champions Cup
Tournament details
- Teams: 9

Final positions
- Champions: Reus Deportiu (6th title)
- Runners-up: Novara

Tournament statistics
- Matches played: 16
- Goals scored: 206 (12.88 per match)

The 1971–72 Roller Hockey Champions Cup was the 7th edition of the Roller Hockey Champions Cup organized by CERH.

Reus Deportiu achieved their sixth consecutive title.

== Teams ==
The champions of the main European leagues, and Reus Deportiu as title holders, played this competition, consisting in a double-legged knockout tournament. As Reus Deportiu was also the Spanish league champions, Noia also joined the tournament.

== Bracket ==
First round
(Switzerland) RS Zürich	12	5	17
(France) Coutras	4	13	17
(Belgium) Rolta	5	3	8
(Italy) Novara	11	11	22
(Germany) Walsum	16	13	29
(Netherlands) Dordt	2	6	8
(Spain) Reus Deportiu	7	0	7
(Spain) Noia	3	2	5

Quarterfinals
(France) Coutras	3	3	6
(Italy) Novara	8	13	21
(Germany) Walsum	3	5	8
(Spain) Reus Deportiu	3	9	12

Semifinals
(Italy) Novara	8	3	11
(Portugal) Lourenço Marques	3	8	11
(Spain) Reus Deportiu

Final
(Italy) Novara	10	0	10
(Spain) Reus Deportiu	2	11	13
