= 1976–77 Roller Hockey Champions Cup =

1976–77 Champions Cup
Tournament details
- Teams: 9

Final positions
- Champions: Sporting CP (1st title)
- Runners-up: Vilanova

Tournament statistics
- Matches played: 16
- Goals scored: 166 (10.38 per match)

The 1976–77 Roller Hockey Champions Cup was the 12th edition of the Roller Hockey Champions Cup organized by CERH.

Sporting CP achieved their first title ever.

== Teams ==
The champions of the main European leagues, and Voltregà as title holders, played this competition, consisting in a double-legged knockout tournament. As Voltregà qualified also as Spanish champion, Vilanova joined also the competition.

== Bracket ==
First round
(Germany) Iserlohn	5	5	10
(Italy) Breganze	3	12	15

Quarterfinals
(Netherlands) Residentie	6	2	8
(France) La Vendéenne	4	2	6
(Belgium) Rolta	2	1	3
(Spain) Vilanova	6	10	16
(Spain) Voltregà	9	5	14
(Italy) Breganze	0	5	5
(Portugal) Sporting CP	18	11	29
(Switzerland) Montreux	1	3	4

Semifinals
(Netherlands) Residentie	4	2	6
(Spain) Vilanova	2	12	14
(Spain) Voltregà	5	3	8
(Portugal) Sporting CP	2	8	10

Final
(Portugal) Sporting CP	6	6	12
(Spain) Vilanova	0	3	3
