= 1991–92 Roller Hockey Champions Cup =

1991–92 Champions Cup
Tournament details
- Teams: 8

Final positions
- Champions: Liceo (3rd title)
- Runners-up: Seregno

Tournament statistics
- Matches played: 14
- Goals scored: 145 (10.36 per match)

The 1991–92 Roller Hockey Champions Cup was the 28th edition of the Roller Hockey Champions Cup organized by CERH.

Liceo achieved their third title.

== Teams ==
The champions of the main European leagues and Barcelos, as title holder, played this competition, consisting in a double-legged knockout tournament.

== Bracket ==
Quarterfinals
(Italy) Seregno	9	7	16
(Germany) Walsum	2	6	8
(Belgium) Kurink	5	5	10
(Portugal) Barcelos	7	12	19
(France) Saint-Omer	2	3	5
(Portugal) Porto	5	14	19
(Switzerland) Thunerstern	3	1	4
(Spain) Liceo	8	9	17

Semifinals
(Italy) Seregno	6	2	8
(Portugal) Barcelos	3	3	6
(Portugal) Porto	2	5	7
(Spain) Liceo	4	5	9

Final
(Italy) Seregno	6	2	8
(Spain) Liceo	7	2	9
