= 1973–74 Roller Hockey Champions Cup =

1973–74 Champions Cup
Tournament details
- Teams: 9

Final positions
- Champions: Barcelona (2nd title)
- Runners-up: Lourenço Marques

Tournament statistics
- Matches played: 15
- Goals scored: 185 (12.33 per match)

The 1973–74 Roller Hockey Champions Cup was the 9th edition of the Roller Hockey Champions Cup organized by CERH.

Barcelona achieved their second title.

== Teams ==
The champions of the main European leagues, and Barcelona as title holders, played this competition, consisting in a double-legged knockout tournament.

== Bracket ==
First round
(Germany) Walsum	28	9	37
(France) Gujan-Mestras	3	5	8
(Italy) Novara	8	11	19
(England) Southsea	1	2	3
(Portugal) Lourenço Marques	13	7	20
(Switzerland) RS Zürich	3	3	6
(Belgium) Royal Sunday	5	1	6
(Spain) Reus Deportiu	6	15	21

Quarterfinals
(Spain) Barcelona	6	2	8
(Germany) Walsum	5	3	8
(Italy) Novara	4	–	—
(Portugal) Lourenço Marques	13	w.o.	—
(Spain) Reus Deportiu

Semifinals
(Spain) Barcelona
(Spain) Reus Deportiu	5	1	6
(Portugal) Lourenço Marques	4	3	7

Final
(Spain) Barcelona	8	4	12
(Portugal) Lourenço Marques	2	5	7
