= 1983–84 Roller Hockey Champions Cup =

1983–84 Champions Cup
Tournament details
- Teams: 10

Final positions
- Champions: Barcelona (9th title)
- Runners-up: Liceo

Tournament statistics
- Matches played: 18
- Goals scored: 215 (11.94 per match)

The 1984–85 Roller Hockey Champions Cup was the 19th edition of the Roller Hockey Champions Cup organized by CERH.

Barcelona achieved their ninth title ever.

== Teams ==
The champions of the main European leagues, and Barcelona as title holders, played this competition, consisting in a double-legged knockout tournament.

== Bracket ==
First round
(Germany) Ober-Ramstadt	4	4	8
(Italy) Amatori Vercelli	9	7	16
(Portugal) Porto	15	10	25
(Belgium) Royal Sunday	3	2	5

Quarterfinals
(Italy) Amatori Vercelli	6	4	10
(Portugal) Porto	3	13	16
(Switzerland) Montreux	6	5	11
(Spain) Barcelona	11	16	27
(England) Southsea	6	3	9
(France) Coutras	3	2	5
(Spain) Liceo	10	6	16
(Netherlands) Lichtstad	3	4	7

Semifinals
(Portugal) Porto	8	1	9
(Spain) Barcelona	3	9	12
(England) Southsea	3	2	5
(Spain) Liceo	5	13	18

Final
(Spain) Barcelona	6	2	8
(Spain) Liceo	2	3	5
