= 1989–90 Roller Hockey Champions Cup =

1989–90 Champions Cup
Tournament details
- Teams: 9

Final positions
- Champions: Porto (2nd title)
- Runners-up: Noia

Tournament statistics
- Matches played: 16
- Goals scored: 167 (10.44 per match)

The 1989–90 Roller Hockey Champions Cup was the 26th edition of the Roller Hockey Champions Cup organized by CERH.

Porto achieved their second title ever.

== Teams ==
The champions of the main European leagues and Noia, as title holder, played this competition, consisting in a double-legged knockout tournament.

== Bracket ==
First round
(Italy) Monza	4	2	6
(Portugal) Porto (p)	3	3	6

Quarterfinals
(Belgium) Kurink	2	4	6
(Spain) Igualada	10	20	30
(Portugal) Porto	4	1	5
(Germany) Walsum	1	0	1
(Netherlands) Dennenberg	5	2	7
(Switzerland) Thunerstern	4	9	13
(France) La Vendéenne	4	0	4
(Spain) Noia	12	17	29

Semifinals
(Spain) Igualada	4	2	6
(Portugal) Porto	8	4	12
(Switzerland) Thunerstern	4	1	5
(Spain) Noia	5	14	19

Final
(Portugal) Porto	6	5	11
(Spain) Noia	0	2	2
