= 1980–81 Roller Hockey Champions Cup =

1980–81 Champions Cup
Tournament details
- Teams: 10

Final positions
- Champions: Barcelona (6th title)
- Runners-up: Giovinazzo

Tournament statistics
- Matches played: 17
- Goals scored: 159 (9.35 per match)

The 1980–81 Roller Hockey Champions Cup was the 16th edition of the Roller Hockey Champions Cup organized by CERH.

Barcelona achieved their sixth title.

== Teams ==
The champions of the main European leagues, and Barcelona as title holders, played this competition, consisting in a double-legged knockout tournament. As Barcelona qualified also as Spanish champion, Tordera joined also the competition.

== Bracket ==
First round
(England) Sothsea	7	0	7
(France) Coutras	3	15	18
(Belgium) Royal Sunday	8	7	15
(Switzerland) Thunerstern	4	6	10

Quarterfinals
(Germany) Cronenberg	2	1	3
(Spain) Tordera	0	9	9
(Portugal) Benfica	3	5	8
(Spain) Barcelona	2	10	12
(Netherlands) Valkenswaardse	2	1	3
(Italy) Giovinazzo	1	8	9
(France) Coutras	3	–	—
(Belgium) Royal Sunday	6	w.o.	—

Semifinals
(Spain) Tordera	0	4	4
(Spain) Barcelona	4	9	13
(Italy) Giovinazzo	15	2	17
(Belgium) Royal Sunday	1	6	7

Final
(Spain) Barcelona	6	6	12
(Italy) Giovinazzo	1	2	3
