= Hockey Club Lodi =

Defunct Italian rink-hockey team

- Full name: Hockey Club Lodi
- Founded: 1948
- Dissolved: 1996
- Home ground: PalaCastellotti, Lodi, Lombardy, Italy
| Home | Away |

Hockey Club Lodi was a roller hockey team from Lodi, Italy. It was founded in 1948 and it was dissolved in 1996 due to financial hardship.

== See also ==
- Amatori Wasken Lodi
