= US Triestina Hockey =

Italian roller hockey team

US Triestina Hockey
Club Name	Hockey Club Monza
Foundation	1922
Extinction	1990

US Triestina Hockey was a Roller Hockey team from Trieste, Italy. It was founded in 1925 and disappeared in 1990.

== Honours ==
- Serie A1 italian championship: 19
  - 1925°, 1926°, 1927°, 1928°, 1929°, 1937*, 1938*, 1939*, 1940*, 1941*, 1942*, 1945°, 1952°, 1954°, 1955°, 1962°, 1963°, 1964°, 1967°

° as US Triestina (as one of the many sports sections composing the "Unione Sportiva").
* as Pubblico Impiego Trieste.
