= Sporting Clube de Tomar =

Portuguese sports club

Sporting Clube de Tomar (also known as Sporting de Tomar, SC Tomar and Sp. Tomar) is a Portuguese sports club from Tomar, founded on 26 February 1915. It has had particular competitive success and notability in the sports of rink hockey and artistic roller skating. Its main men's roller hockey team plays in the Portuguese Roller Hockey First Division and won the Portuguese Roller Hockey Cup in 2023. Other sports practiced in the club are billiards, judo, krav maga and table tennis.

It is one of the most representative clubs in the Centro Region of Portugal due to its history, being the 1st branch of Sporting Clube de Portugal (Sporting CP). It has been distinguished with the Municipal Medal of Merit (Gold Grade) awarded by the Municipality of Tomar, the Medal of Merit and Leonine Dedication by Sporting CP, the Medal of Good Sports Services by the Portuguese Ministry of Education, and the Public Utility Entity (Entidade de Utilidade Pública) status in Portugal.
