= AD Valongo =

Roller hockey club from Valongo, Portugal

- Full name: Associação Desportiva de Valongo
- League: 1ª Divisão
- Founded: 1955
- Home ground: Pavilhão Municipal de Valongo (Capacity 1,300)

Personnel
- Chairman: João Paupério
- Manager: Edo Bosch
- Website: facebook.com/ADValongo
Home	Away

Associação Desportiva de Valongo is a roller hockey club from Valongo, Portugal.

== Current squad ==
2022–23
#	Nationality	Name	Position	Age	Last Club
30	Portugal	Gonçalo Bento	Goalkeeper	19	AD Valongo
47	Portugal	Xano Edo	Goalkeeper	21	CP Calafell
2	Portugal	Gabriel Azevedo	Defender/Midfielder	20	AD Valongo
6	Portugal	Francisco Silva	Defender/Midfielder	32	Juventude de Viana
11	Portugal	Carlos Ramos	Defender/Midfielder	22	FC Porto
22	Portugal	Nuno Santos	Defender/Midfielder	26	Juventude de Viana
78	Portugal	Diogo Abreu	Defender/Midfielder	21	AD Valongo
2	Portugal	Martim Leite	Forward	19	AD Valongo
5	Portugal	Miguel Moura	Forward	22	HC Braga
17	Portugal	Rafael Bessa	Forward	21	AD Valongo
33	Argentina	Facundo Navarro	Forward	22	AD Sanjoanense
87	Argentina	Facundo Bridge	Forward	23	Riba D´Ave
–	Spain	Edo Bosch	Coach	47	Portugal (assistant coach)

== Honours ==
=== International competitions ===
- WSE Continental Cup: 1
  - 2022–23

=== Domestic competitions ===
- Portuguese First Division: 1
  - 2013–14
- Portuguese Super Cup: 1
  - 2014
- Portuguese Second Division: 4
  - 1983–84, 1985–86, 1988–89, 1996–97

==== B Team ====
- Portuguese Third Division: 1
  - 2018–19
