= HC Monza =

Roller Hockey team from Monza, Italy

HC Monza
| Club Name | Hockey Club Monza |
| Foundation | 1933 |
| Extinction | 2004 |

Hockey Club Monza was a Roller Hockey team from Monza, Italy. It was founded in 1933 and closed in 2004.

== Honours ==
=== National ===
- Serie A1 italian championship: 7
  - 1951, 1953, 1956, 1961, 1965, 1966, 1968
- Coppa Italia: 3
  - 1971, 1984, 1989

=== International ===
- CERS Cup: 1
  - 1988–89
