= HC Forte dei Marmi =

Forte dei Marmi
- Full name: Hockey Club Forte dei Marmi
- League: Serie A1
- Founded: 1962
- Home ground: PalaForte, Forte dei Marmi, Italy (Capacity 1,200)

Personnel
- Chairman: Piero Tosi
- Manager: Pierluigi Brescani
- Website: Official website
Home	Away

Hockey Club Forte dei Marmi is a roller hockey team from Forte dei Marmi, Italy. It was founded in 1962 and later refounded in 1995 due to their financial struggle.

== Honours ==
=== National ===
- Italian Championship: 3
  - 2013–14, 2014–15, 2015–16
- Coppa Italia: 1
  - 2016–17
- Italian Supercup: 2
  - 2014, 2017
