= IGR Remscheid =

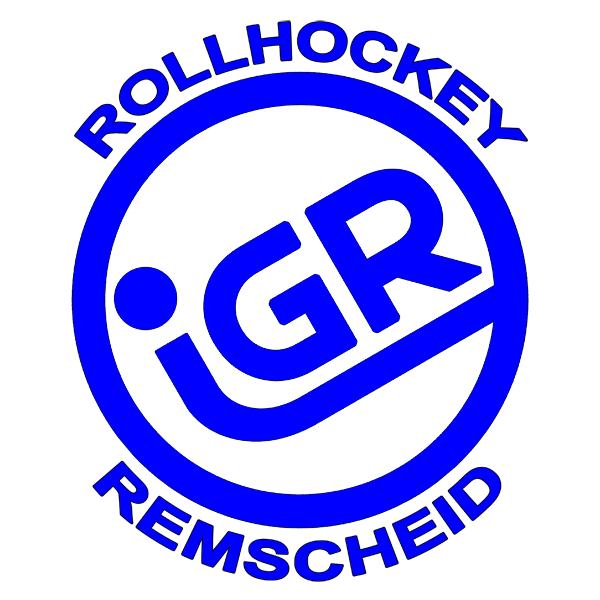
- Full name: Rollsportverein IGR Remscheid
- League: Bundesliga
- Founded: April 1962, 1; 63 years ago
- Home ground: Sporthalle Hackenberg, Remscheid, Germany (Capacity 400)

The IGR Remscheid is a Roller Hockey team from Remscheid, North Rhine-Westphalia, Germany.

== History ==
Founded on 1 April 1962, IGR Remscheid won 5 German championships (1968, 69, 78, 92 and 94). In the preliminary round of the Rollhockey-Bundesliga 2015-16 IGR Remscheid finished on no. 7. For the first time in club history IGR Remscheid won the German cup in 2016.

== Trophies ==
- 5 German Championship
- 1 German Cup
