= Amatori Wasken Lodi =

Amatori Lodi
- Full name: Amatori Wasken Lodi
- League: Serie A1
- Founded: 1965
- Home ground: PalaCastellotti, Lodi, Lombardy, Italy (Capacity 4,000)

Personnel
- Chairman: (Italy) Gianni Blanchetti
- Manager: (Italy) Pierluigi Bresciani
- Website: Official website
Home	Away

Amatori Wasken Lodi (Italian pronunciation: [amaˈtoːri ˈvasken ˈlɔːdi]) is a roller hockey team from Lodi, Italy. It was established in 1965.

== Honours ==
=== National ===
- Serie A1 italian championship: 4
  - 1980–81, 2016–17, 2017–18, 2020–21
- Coppa Italia: 4
  - 1978, 2011–12, 2015–16, 2020–21
- Italian Supercup: 2
  - 2016, 2018
- League Cup: 1
  - 2009–10

=== International ===
- WS Europe Cup: 1
  - 1986–87
- Cup Winners' Cup: 1
  - 1993–94

== See also ==
- Hockey Club Lodi
