= HC Dinan Quévert =

Roller hockey team in France

Quévert
- Full name: HC Dinan Quévert Côtes d'Armor - Team Cordon
- League: Nationale 1
- Founded: 1987
- Home ground: Salle Omnisports, Dinan, France (Capacity 1,400)

Hockey Club Quévertois is a roller hockey team from Dinan, France, founded in 1987.

== Trophies ==
- French Championship: (11)
  - 1997, 1998, 1999, 2000, 2002, 2012, 2014, 2015, 2018, 2019
- French Cup: 3
  - 2008, 2013, 2015
