= La Vendéenne =

- Full name: La Vendéenne La Roche-sur-Yon
- League: Nationale 1
- Founded: 1956
- Home ground: Salle de l'Angelmière, La Roche-sur-Yon, France (Capacity 264)

La Vendéenne is a Roller Hockey team from La Roche-sur-Yon, France, founded in 1956.

== Trophies ==
- French Championship: (13)
  - 1975–76, 1977–78, 1978–79, 1981–82, 1986–87, 1988–89, 1995–96, 2002–03, 2003–04, 2004–05, 2006–07, 2015–16, 2016–17
- French Cup: 6
  - 2002, 2006, 2007, 2011, 2014, 2016
