= FC Porto (roller hockey) =

Roller hockey section of FC Porto

- Full name: Futebol Clube do Porto Fidelidade
- League: Portuguese First Division
- Founded: 1955 (71 years ago)
- Home ground: Dragão Arena (Capacity 2,200)

Personnel
- Coach: Paulo Freitas
- Manager: Franklim Pais
- Website: fcporto.pt
Home	Away

Futebol Clube do Porto (Portuguese pronunciation: [futɨˈβɔl ˈkluβɨ ðu ˈpoɾtu]), commonly referred to as FC Porto (or FC Porto Fidelidade, for sponsorship purposes), or simply Porto, is a Portuguese professional roller hockey team based in Porto. They compete in the Portuguese First Division, the top-tier league in the country, and play their home matches at the Dragão Arena.

In domestic competitions, Porto have won 26 league titles (10 of which conquered consecutively between the 2001–02 and 2010–11 seasons, a Portuguese roller hockey record), 19 Portuguese Cups, 23 Portuguese Super Cups and three Portuguese Elite Cups. Internationally, they have won four WSE Champions League titles, two WSE Cups, two CERH Cup Winners' Cups, two WSE Continental Cups and one Intercontinental Cup.

== Current squad ==
Squad for the 2024–25 season:

Goalkeepers

- 1 (Spain) Xavier Malián
- 24 (Portugal) Leonardo Pais

Defenders / Midfielders

- 5 (Portugal) Telmo Pinto
- 6 (Spain) Edu Lamas
- 78 (Portugal) Hélder Nunes
- 88 (Portugal) Diogo Barata

Forwards

- 4 (Portugal) Tomás Santos
- 7 (Argentina) Ezequiel Mena
- 9 (Portugal) Rafael Costa
- 19 (France) Carlo Di Benedetto
- 77 (Portugal) Gonçalo Alves

== Technical staff ==
Technical staff for the 2024–25 season:

Position	Name
Section director	(Portugal) Eurico Pinto
Assistant director	(Portugal) João Baldaia
Team manager	(Portugal) Franklim Pais
Head coach	(Spain) Ricardo Ares
Assistant coaches	(Portugal) Diogo Oliveira (Portugal) Nélson Filipe
Equipment technician	(Portugal) Francisco Monteiro
Doctor	(Portugal) Frederico Raposo
Physiotherapist	(Portugal) Pedro Quintas
Nurse	(Portugal) Daniel Cunha

== Honours ==
=== Domestic Competitions ===
- Portuguese First Division

Winners (26) – record: 1982–83, 1983–84, 1984–85, 1985–86, 1986–87, 1988–89, 1989–90, 1990–91, 1998–99, 1999–00, 2001–02, 2002–03, 2003–04, 2004–05, 2005–06, 2006–07, 2007–08, 2008–09, 2009–10, 2010–11, 2012–13, 2016–17, 2018–19, 2021–22, 2023–24, 2024–25

- Portuguese Cup

Winners (19) – record: 1982–83, 1984–85, 1985–86, 1986–87, 1987–88, 1988–89, 1995–96, 1997–98, 1998–99, 2004–05, 2005–06, 2007–08, 2008–09, 2012–13, 2015–16, 2016–17, 2017–18, 2021–22, 2023–24

- Portuguese Super Cup

Winners (23) – record: 1984, 1985, 1986, 1987, 1988, 1989, 1990, 1991, 1992, 1996, 1998, 2000, 2005, 2006, 2007, 2008, 2009, 2011, 2013, 2016, 2017, 2018, 2019

- Portuguese Elite Cup

Winners (3): 2019, 2022, 2026

=== European Competitions ===
- WSE Champions League

Winners (4): 1985–86, 1989–90, 2022–23, 2025–26

- WSE Cup

Winners (2): 1993–94, 1995–96

- Cup Winners' Cup

Winners (2): 1981–82, 1982–83

- WSE Continental Cup

Winners (3): 1986, 2023, 2026

=== World Competitions ===
- Intercontinental Cup

Winners (1): 2021
