= Hockey Novara =

Roller Hockey team from Novara, Italy

Hockey Novara
Club Name	Hockey Novara
Image
Foundation	1924
Arena	Novara; Italy

Hockey Novara is a Roller Hockey team from Novara, Italy. It was founded in 1924 and interrupted the activities in 2009. Activities restart in 2021.

== Honours ==
=== National ===
- Serie A1 italian championship: 32 (italian record)
  - 1930, 1931, 1932, 1933, 1934, 1936, 1946, 1947, 1949, 1950, 1958, 1959, 1969, 1970, 1971, 1972, 1973, 1974, 1975, 1977, 1985, 1987, 1988, 1993, 1994, 1995, 1997, 1998, 1999, 2000, 2001, 2002
- Coppa Italia: 20 (italian record)
  - 1966, 1967, 1969, 1970, 1972, 1976, 1985, 1986, 1987, 1988, 1993, 1994, 1995, 1996, 1997, 1998, 1999, 2000, 2001, 2002
- Coppa di Lega: 3 (italian record)
  - 1999, 2000, 2001

=== International ===
- World Skate Europe Cup: 3
  - 1985, 1992, 1993
