= 2020–21 Rink Hockey Euroleague =

Tournament details
- Host country: Portugal
- City: Luso
- Dates: 9 April 2021– 16 May 2021
- Teams: 9 (from 2 associations)
- Venue(s): 1 (in 1 host city)

Final positions
- Champions: (Portugal) Sporting CP (3rd title)
- Runners-up: (Portugal) Porto

Tournament statistics
- Matches played: 12
- Goals scored: 101 (8.42 per match)
- Attendance: 0 (0 per match)
- Top scorer(s): (Spain) Pol Manrubia (Spain) Marc Torra (Spain) Toni Pérez (5 goals)
- Best player(s): Gonzalo Romero
- Best goalkeeper: Ângelo Girão

The 2020–21 Rink Hockey Euroleague was the 56th season of Europe's premier club roller hockey tournament organised by World Skate Europe – Rink Hockey, and the 24th season since it was renamed from European Champion Clubs' Cup to Euroleague.

The defending champions Sporting CP defeated Porto in the final to claim their second consecutive title and third overall.

== Team allocation ==
=== Association ranking ===
Due to the cancelation of the tournament's last edition, the 2019–20 season was discarded and associations were allocated places according to the same coefficient as in the 2018–19 season, taking in account the performance of each association's representative teams in European competitions between the 2015–16 and the 2018–19 seasons.

Participation is reserved to teams from associations that have an effective capacity to organise annually their own national championships. They will all have at least one team entering the competition. To allocate the other nine places, the D'Hondt method was applied to the coefficient of each association, for a maximum of four teams. In case of withdrawals, priority would be given according to the order established by the D'Hondt method.

Rank	Association	Coefficient	Teams	D'Hondt points		
1	Portugal	21.667	4	10.833	7.222	5.417
2	Spain	18.500	4	9.250	6.167	4.625
3	Italy	16.235	3	8.118	5.412	4.059
4	France	8.560	2	4.280	2.853	2.140
5	Switzerland	5.727	1	2.864	1.909	1.432
6	Germany	4.909	1	2.455	1.636	1.227
7	England	3.000	1	1.500	1.000	0.750

=== Teams ===
The labels in the parentheses show how each team qualified for the place of its starting round:

- TH: Euroleague title holders
- 1st, 2nd, 3rd, 4th, etc.: League positions of the previous season
- Abd-: League positions of abandoned season due to the COVID-19 pandemic in Europe as determined by the national association
- Dis-: The previous season was discarded due to the COVID-19 pandemic in Europe and the 2018–19 season positions were used for qualification

Qualified teams for 2020–21 Rink Hockey Euroleague
Entry round	Teams			
QP	(Portugal) Sporting (Dis-3rd)^{TH}	(Portugal) Porto (Dis-1st)	(Portugal) Oliveirense (Dis-2nd)	(Portugal) Benfica (Dis-4th)
QP	(Spain) Barcelona (Abd-1st)	(Spain) Liceo (Abd-2nd)	(Spain) Noia (Abd-3rd)	(Spain) Reus (Abd-4th)
QP	(Portugal) Barcelos (Dis-5th)			

Originally, as stated by World Skate Europe – Rink Hockey (WSE–RH), thirteen teams registered to play the tournament. Missing three teams to complete the regular field of sixteen, WSE–RH sent a request to three teams qualified for the World Skate Europe Cup to join the competition. The teams joining the field of sixteen were Barcelos, from Portugal, Coutras, from France, and Genève, from Switzerland. The original 2020–21 Rink Hockey Euroleague tournament field was as follows:

Original qualified teams for 2020–21 Rink Hockey Euroleague
Entry round	Teams			
GS	(Portugal) Sporting (Dis-3rd)^{TH}	(Portugal) Porto (Dis-1st)	(Portugal) Oliveirense (Dis-2nd)	(Portugal) Benfica (Dis-4th)
GS	(Spain) Barcelona (Abd-1st)	(Spain) Liceo (Abd-2nd)	(Spain) Noia (Abd-3rd)	(Spain) Reus (Abd-4th)
GS	(Italy) Bassano (Abd-12th)	(France) Saint-Omer (Abd-1st)	(France) La Vendéenne (Abd-2nd)	(Switzerland) Diessbach (Abd-2nd)
GS	(Germany) Germania Herringen (Abd-1st)	(Portugal) Barcelos (Abd-5th)	(France) Coutras (Abd-4th)	(Switzerland) Genève (Abd-1st)

Notes

1. Spain (ESP): The 2019–20 OK Liga was abandoned due to the COVID-19 pandemic in Spain. The league positions at the time of the abandonment were used to determine the champion and the teams selected to play in the 2020–21 WS Europe Cup.
2. Portugal (POR): The 2019–20 Portuguese Roller Hockey First Division was abandoned due to the COVID-19 pandemic in Portugal. The season was discarded, with no title awarded nor relegations. The previous season league positions were used to determine the teams selected to play in the 2020–21 Rink Hockey Euroleague.

=== Effects of the COVID-19 pandemic ===
On 18 October 2020, the World Skate Europe-Rink Hockey Committee decided to postpone most matchday 1 matches due to travel restrictions imposed by the COVID-19 pandemic in Europe. Later that month, on 29 October, it was announced that all WSERHC international competitions would be suspended until the end of the year.

On 17 January 2021, an updated list of clubs interested in participating under new conditions was published, with all but the nine Portuguese and Spanish clubs giving up on the competition. A new format for the 9 teams was established, consisting of two stages. The first stage, the qualifying stage, consists of three groups of three teams, each one playing one match against the other two teams in the same group at a centralized location. The second stage, the final four, consists of single-legged semi-finals and final with the teams finishing first in each qualifying stage group as well as the best runner up, also played at a centralized location.

== Round and draw dates ==
The schedule of the competition was as follows.

Schedule for 2020–21 Rink Hockey Euroleague
Phase	Round	Draw date	Date
Qualifying phase	Matchday 1	27 February 2021	9 April 2021
Qualifying phase	Matchday 2	27 February 2021	10 April 2021
Qualifying phase	Matchday 3	27 February 2021	11 April 2021
Final four	Semi-finals	27 February 2021	15 May 2021
Final four	Final	27 February 2021	16 May 2021

The original schedule of the competition, as planned before the pandemic, was as follows.

Original schedule for 2020–21 Rink Hockey Euroleague
Phase	Round	Draw date	Date
Group stage	Matchday 1	12 September 2020	7 November 2020
Group stage	Matchday 2	12 September 2020	21 November 2020
Group stage	Matchday 3	12 September 2020	12 December 2020
Group stage	Matchday 4	12 September 2020	16 January 2021
Group stage	Matchday 5	12 September 2020	30 January 2021
Group stage	Matchday 6	12 September 2020	13 February 2021
Knockout phase	Quarter-finals	TBD	20 March 2021
Knockout phase	Semi-finals	TBD	17 April 2021
Knockout phase	Final	TBD	15 May 2021

== Qualifying phase ==
=== Tiebreakers ===
Teams were ranked according to points (3 points for a win, 1 point for a draw, 0 points for a loss). If two or more teams were tied on points, the following tiebreaking criteria were applied, in the order given, to determine the rankings:

1. Points in head-to-head matches among the tied teams;
2. Goal difference in all group matches;
3. Goal ratio, resulting from dividing the total number of goals scored by the total number of goals conceded;
4. Team fouls;
5. Blue cards;
6. Red cards.

=== Group A ===
Pos	Team	Pld	W	D	L	GF	GA	GD	Pts	Qualification	POR	OCB	NOI
1	(Portugal) Porto	2	1	1	0	10	7	+3	4	Advance to final four	—	—	7–4
2	(Portugal) Barcelos	2	0	2	0	8	8	0	2		3–3	—	—
3	(Spain) Noia	2	0	1	1	9	12	−3	1		—	5–5	—

Source: wseurope-rinkhockey.org
Rules for classification: Tiebreakers

=== Group B ===
Pos	Team	Pld	W	D	L	GF	GA	GD	Pts	Qualification	OLI	SPO	REU
1	(Portugal) Oliveirense	2	1	1	0	11	7	+4	4	Advance to final four	—	6–6	—
2	(Portugal) Sporting	2	1	1	0	11	9	+2	4	Advance to final four	—	—	5–3
3	(Spain) Reus	2	0	0	2	4	10	−6	0		1–5	—	—

Source: wseurope-rinkhockey.org
Rules for classification: Tiebreakers

=== Group C ===
Pos	Team	Pld	W	D	L	GF	GA	GD	Pts	Qualification	BEN	FCB	LIC
1	(Portugal) Benfica	2	2	0	0	13	4	+9	6	Advance to final four	—	6–2	—
2	(Spain) Barcelona	2	0	1	1	4	8	−4	1		—	—	2–2
3	(Spain) Liceo	2	0	1	1	4	9	−5	1		2–7	—	—

Source: wseurope-rinkhockey.org
Rules for classification: Tiebreakers

=== Ranking of second-placed teams ===
Pos	Grp	Team	Pld	W	D	L	GF	GA	GD	Pts	Qualification
1	B	(Portugal) Sporting	2	1	1	0	11	9	+2	4	Advance to final four
2	A	(Portugal) Barcelos	2	0	2	0	8	8	0	2	
3	C	(Spain) Barcelona	2	0	1	1	4	8	−4	1	

Source: wseurope-rinkhockey.org
Rules for classification: 1) Points; 2) Goal difference; 3) Goal ratio; 4) Team fouls; 5) Blue cards; 6) Red cards; 7) 2018–19 Euroleague Ranking.

== Final four ==
All times are local, WEST (UTC+1).

=== Bracket ===
Semi-finals
15 May 2021
(Portugal) Porto	6
(Portugal) Oliveirense	4
15 May 2021
(Portugal) Benfica	5 (1)
(Portugal) Sporting (pen.)	5 (2)

Final
16 May 2021
(Portugal) Porto	3
(Portugal) Sporting (a.e.t.)	4

=== Semi-finals ===
15 May 2021
17:00

Porto (Portugal)	6–4	(Portugal) Oliveirense
	Report

Pavilhão Gimnodesportivo Municipal, Luso
Attendance: 0
Referee: Sergi Mayor, Iván González (Spain)

15 May 2021
21:00

Benfica (Portugal)	5–5 (a.e.t.)	(Portugal) Sporting
	Report
Penalties
	1–2

Pavilhão Gimnodesportivo Municipal, Luso
Attendance: 0
Referee: Franco Ferrari, Filippo Fronte (Italy)

=== Final ===
16 May 2021
17:30

Porto (Portugal)	3–4 (a.e.t.)	(Portugal) Sporting
	Report

Pavilhão Gimnodesportivo Municipal, Luso
Attendance: 0
Referee: Sergi Mayor, Iván González (Spain)

== See also ==
- 2020–21 World Skate Europe Cup
- 2020–21 Rink Hockey European Female League
