= 2019–20 World Skate Europe Cup =

2019–20 WS Europe Cup
Tournament details
- Teams: 30 (from 8 associations)

The 2019–20 World Skate Europe Cup will be the 40th season of the World Skate Europe Cup, the second one with the new name of the formerly known as CERS Cup, Europe's second club roller hockey competition organized by World Skate Europe. Lleida Llista Blava are the defending champions.

== Teams ==
30 teams from seven national associations participated in the competition. League positions of the previous season, after eventual playoffs, are shown in parentheses.

Participating teams
(France) La Vendéenne (3rd)	(Spain) Voltregà (8th)	(Germany) Düsseldorf-Nord (3rd)	(Portugal) Barcelos (5th)
(France) Coutras (4th)	(Spain) Girona (9th)	(Germany) Darmstadt (4th)	(Portugal) Braga (6th)
(France) Ploufragan (5th)	(Switzerland) Diessbach (3rd)	(Germany) Cronenberg (5th)	(Portugal) Juventude Viana (8th)
(France) Nantes (6th)	(Switzerland) Montreux (4th)	(Italy) Valdagno (3rd)	(Austria) Dornbirn (1st)
(France) Lyon (9th)	(Switzerland) Genève (5th)	(Italy) Follonica (6th)	(Austria) Wolfurt (2nd)
(Spain) Igualada (5th)	(Switzerland) Uttigen (8th)	(Italy) Trissino (8th)	(England) London (2nd)
(Spain) Lleida Llista Blava (6th)	(Switzerland) Wimmis (9th)	(Italy) Scandiano (10th)	(England) Soham
(Spain) Caldes (7th)	(Germany) Remscheid (2nd)		

== Bracket ==
The draw was held on 6 September 2019 at World Skate Europe headquarters in Lisbon, Portugal. Spanish side Lleida Llista Blava and Italian side Valdagno received byes to the round of 16 as winners and semifinalists of the 2018–19 World Skate Europe Cup, respectively.

Round of 32
73/87
(France) Coutras	3	2	5
(Spain) Voltregà (a.e.t.)	2	5	7
67/81
(Austria) Wolfurt	4	4	8
(France) Ploufragan	2	5	7
69/83
(Spain) Caldes	6	4	10
(France) Nantes	1	0	1
74/88
(France) La Vendéenne	8	3	11
(Germany) Cronenberg	6	1	7
75/89
(Switzerland) Uttigen	2	2	4
(Portugal) Juventude Viana	5	14	19
71/85
(Italy) Trissino	3	4	7
(Switzerland) Diessbach	1	2	3
76/90
(France) Lyon	7	3	10
(England) London	1	2	3
66/80
(Austria) Dornbirn	8	1	9
(England) Soham	0	0	0
68/82
(Portugal) Barcelos	8	4	12
(Switzerland) Genève	1	1	2
65/79
(Italy) Scandiano	15	8	23
(Germany) Darmstadt	4	4	8
70/84
(Switzerland) Wimmis	1	2	3
(Spain) Igualada	10	6	16
64/78
(Germany) Remscheid	0	1	1
(Portugal) Braga	16	8	24
72/86
(Germany) Düsseldorf-Nord	0	2	2
(Spain) Girona	7	7	14
63/77
(Italy) Follonica	5	4	9
(Switzerland) Montreux	3	2	5

Round of 16
98/106
(Spain) Voltregà	6	7	13
(Austria) Wolfurt	1	2	3
94/102
(Spain) Caldes	4	2	6
(France) La Vendéenne	1	2	3
93/101
(Portugal) Juventude Viana	3	0	3
(Italy) Trissino (pso 2–3)	0	3	3
92/100
(France) Lyon	3	3	6
(Austria) Dornbirn	4	5	9
95/103
(Portugal) Barcelos	5	2	7
(Spain) Lleida Llista Blava	1	2	3
97/105
(Italy) Scandiano	4	6	10
(Spain) Igualada (pso 2–3)	3	7	10
96/104
(Portugal) Braga	5	3	8
(Italy) Valdagno	5	2	7
91/99
(Spain) Girona	0	4	4
(Italy) Follonica	1	6	7

Quarterfinals
107/111
(Spain) Voltregà	3	3
(Spain) Caldes	2	2
110/114
(Italy) Trissino	10	10
(Austria) Dornbirn	2	2
108/112
(Portugal) Barcelos	6	6
(Spain) Igualada	4	4
109/113
(Portugal) Braga	7	7
(Italy) Follonica	4	4

Semifinals
115
(Spain)
116

Final
117

== See also ==
- 2019–20 Rink Hockey Euroleague
- 2019 Rink Hockey Continental Cup
- 2019–20 Rink Hockey European Female League
