= 2020–21 World Skate Europe Cup =

2020–21 WS Europe Cup
Tournament details
- Host country: Andorra
- City: Andorra la Vella
- Dates: 18 June 2021– 20 June 2021
- Teams: 7 (from 3 associations)
- Venue(s): 1 (in 1 host city)

Final positions
- Champions: (Spain) Lleida Llista Blava (3rd title)
- Runners-up: (Italy) Sarzana

Tournament statistics
- Matches played: 6
- Goals scored: 36 (6 per match)
- Attendance: 0 (0 per match)

The 2020–21 Rink Hockey Euroleague is the 41st season of Europe's second club roller hockey tournament organised by World Skate Europe – Rink Hockey, and the 3rd season since it was renamed from CERS Cup to World Skate Europe Cup.

As the previous season was interrupted due to the COVID-19 pandemic in Europe, Lleida Llista Blava remain as defending champions, as the winners of the 2018–19 World Skate Europe Cup.

== Teams ==
Each national federation could enter up to five teams.

A total of 26 teams was initially registered to play the WS Europe Cup, but 3 teams were invited to fill vacancies in the Euroleague. Invitations were sent according to the association ranking: Switzerland side Genève and French Coutras took the first two spots, and Portuguese side Barcelos took the third even though Portugal already had the maximum number of teams, as no team from Germany, Austria or England accepted the invitation. This way, the first draw had 23 participating teams, with both 2018–19 World Skate Europe Cup finalists and the best placed team form the seven best associations entering directly on the round of 16 and remaining teams playing a preliminary round.

Original qualified teams for 2020–21 WS Europe Cup
Entry round	Teams			
R16	(Spain) Lleida Llista Blava	(Italy) Sarzana	(Portugal) Braga	(Spain) Girona
R16	(Italy) Follonica	(France) Dinan Quévert	(Switzerland) Biasca	(Germany) Düsseldorf-Nord
R16	(Austria) Wolfurt			
PR	(Portugal) Riba de Ave	(Portugal) Sanjoanense	(Spain) Caldes	(Spain) Igualada
PR	(Spain) Calafell	(France) Noisy-le-Grand	(Switzerland) Montreux	(Switzerland) Uttigen
PR	(Switzerland) Wimmis	(Germany) Walsum	(Germany) Remscheid	(Austria) Dornbirn
PR	(England) King´s Lynn			

On 18 October 2020, the World Skate Europe-Rink Hockey Committee decided to postpone preliminary round matches due to travel restrictions imposed by the COVID-19 pandemic in Europe. Later that month, on 29 October, it was announced that all WSERHC international competitions would be suspended until the end of the year.

On 17 January 2021, an updated list of clubs interested in participating under new conditions was published, with all but the seven teams from three associations withdrawing from the competition. A new format was established for the 7 teams, consisting of a final seven played at a single venue and one-legged matches, with title holders Lleida Llista Blava having a bye to the semi-finals and remaining teams entering the quarter-finals.

The labels in the parentheses show how each team qualified for the place of its starting round:

- 1st, 2nd, 3rd, 4th, etc.: League positions of the previous season
- QF, SF, RU, W: Playoff finish round
- Abd-: League positions of abandoned season due to the COVID-19 pandemic in Europe as determined by the national association
- Dis-: The previous season was discarded due to the COVID-19 pandemic in Europe and the 2018–19 season positions were used for qualification

Qualified teams for 2020–21 WS Europe Cup
Entry round	Teams		
SF	(Spain) Lleida Llista Blava(Abd-9th)		
QF	(Portugal) Riba de Ave (Dis-9th)	(Spain) Girona (Abd-5th)	(Spain) Caldes (Abd-6th)
QF	(Spain) Igualada (Abd-7th)	(Spain) Calafell (Abd-8th)	(Italy) Sarzana (Dis-7th/QF)

Notes

1. Spain (ESP): The 2019–20 OK Liga was abandoned due to the COVID-19 pandemic in Spain. The league positions at the time of the abandonment were used to determine the champion and the teams selected to play in the 2020–21 WS Europe Cup.
2. Italy (ITA): The 2019–20 Serie A1 was abandoned due to the COVID-19 pandemic in Italy. The season was discarded, with no title awarded nor relegations. The previous season league positions were used to determine the teams selected to play in the 2020–21 Rink Hockey Euroleague.
3. Portugal (POR): The 2019–20 Portuguese Roller Hockey First Division was abandoned due to the COVID-19 pandemic in Portugal. The season was discarded, with no title awarded nor relegations. The previous season league positions were used to determine the teams selected to play in the 2020–21 Rink Hockey Euroleague.

== Round and draw dates ==
The schedule of the competition was as follows.

Schedule for 2020–21 WS Europe Cup
Phase	Draw date	Date
Quarter-finals	27 February 2021	18 June 2021
Semi-finals	27 February 2021	19 June 2021
Final	27 February 2021	20 June 2021

The original schedule of the competition, as planned before interruption, was as follows.

Original schedule for 2020–21 WS Europe Cup
Phase	Draw date	First leg	Second leg
Preliminary phase	12 September 2020	7 November 2020	21 November 2020
Round of 16	12 September 2020	12 December 2020	16 January 2021
Quarter-finals	12 September 2020	30 January 2021	13 February 2021
Semi-finals	12 September 2020	24 April 2021	
Final	12 September 2020	25 April 2021	

== Final seven ==
The final seven will be played at the Poliesportiu d'Andorra in Andorra la Vella from 18 to 20 June 2021. It was originally set to be played from 30 April to 2 May 2021, but was postponed to a new date on 23 April 2021.

=== Bracket ===
Quarter-finals
18 June 2021
(Spain) Calafell	2
(Spain) Girona	4
18 June 2021
(Spain) Caldes	6
(Portugal) Riba de Ave	2
18 June 2021
(Italy) Sarzana	3
(Spain) Igualada	2

Semi-finals
19 June 2021
(Spain) Lleida Llista Blava	3
(Spain) Girona	1
19 June 2021
(Spain) Caldes	1
(Italy) Sarzana	4

Final
20 June 2021
(Spain) Lleida Llista Blava	5
(Italy) Sarzana	3

=== Quarter-finals ===
18 June 2021

Calafell (Spain)	2–4	(Spain) Girona
	Report

Poliesportiu d'Andorra, Andorra la Vella

18 June 2021

Caldes (Spain)	6–2	(Portugal) Riba de Ave
	Report

Poliesportiu d'Andorra, Andorra la Vella

18 June 2021

Sarzana (Italy)	3–2	(Spain) Igualada
	Report

Poliesportiu d'Andorra, Andorra la Vella

=== Semi-finals ===
19 June 2021

Lleida Llista Blava (Spain)	3–1	(Spain) Girona
	Report

Poliesportiu d'Andorra, Andorra la Vella

19 June 2021

Caldes (Spain)	1–4	(Italy) Sarzana
	Report

Poliesportiu d'Andorra, Andorra la Vella

=== Final ===
20 June 2021

Lleida Llista Blava (Spain)	5–3	(Italy) Sarzana
	Report

Poliesportiu d'Andorra, Andorra la Vella

== See also ==
- 2020–21 Rink Hockey Euroleague
- 2020–21 Rink Hockey European Female League
