= 2019–20 Rink Hockey Euroleague =

Tournament details
- Dates: 19 October 2019 – 17 May 2020
- Teams: 16 (from 6 associations)

The 2019–20 Rink Hockey Euroleague is the 55th season of Europe's premier club roller hockey tournament organised by World Skate Europe-Rink Hockey Committee, and the 23rd season since it was renamed from European Champion Clubs' Cup to Euroleague.

Sporting CP were the defending champions, but they were eliminated in the group stage.

== Team allocation ==
=== Association ranking ===
For the 2019–20 Rink Hockey Euroleague, the associations were allocated places according to their coefficient, which takes into account the performance of each association's representative teams in European competitions between the 2014–15 and the 2018–19 seasons. The coefficient is calculated by dividing the total of points accumulated by the number of participating teams.

Participation is reserved to teams from associations that have an effective capacity to organise annually their own national championships. They will all have at least one team entering the competition. To allocate the other nine places, the D'Hondt method was applied to the coefficient of each association. In case of withdrawals, priority would be given according to the order established by the D'Hondt method.

Rank	Association	Coefficient	Teams	D'Hondt points		
1	Portugal	21.667	4	10.833	7.222	5.417
2	Spain	18.500	4	9.250	6.167	4.625
3	Italy	16.235	3	8.118	5.412	4.059
4	France	8.560	2	4.280	2.853	2.140
5	Switzerland	5.727	1	2.864	1.909	1.432
6	Germany	4.909	1	2.455	1.636	1.227
7	England	3.000	1	1.500	1.000	0.750

=== Teams ===
League positions of the previous season shown in parentheses (TH: Title holders). As English champions King's Lynn resigned to its place, that was occupied by a fourth Italian team following the allocation criteria.

Group stage
(Portugal) Sporting CP^{TH} (3rd)	(Spain) Barcelona (1st)	(Italy) Forte dei Marmi (1st)	(France) Quévert (1st)
(Portugal) Porto (1st)	(Spain) Liceo (2nd)	(Italy) Amatori Lodi (1st reg)	(France) Saint-Omer (2nd)
(Portugal) Oliveirense (2nd)	(Spain) Reus (3rd)	(Italy) Sarzana (7th)	(Switzerland) Biasca (1st)
(Portugal) Benfica (4th)	(Spain) Noia (4th)	(Italy) Monza (9th)	(Germany) Germania Herringen (1st)

== Round dates ==
The schedule of the competition is as follows.

Phase	Round	First leg	Second leg
Group stage	Matchday 1	19 October 2019	
Group stage	Matchday 2	16 November 2019	
Group stage	Matchday 3	14 December 2019	
Group stage	Matchday 4	18 January 2020	
Group stage	Matchday 5	15 February 2020	
Group stage	Matchday 6	14 March 2020	
Knockout phase	Quarter-finals	28 March 2020	18 April 2020
Knockout phase	Semi-finals	16 May 2020	
Knockout phase	Final	17 May 2020	

== Draw ==
The 16 teams were allocated into four pots, with the title holders, Sporting CP, being placed directly as head-team of the Group A. The other three seeded teams will be from the three top ranked federations according to these priorities:

1. National champions of those leagues.
2. Highest ranked teams.

In each group, teams played against each other home-and-away in a home-and-away round-robin format.

== Group stage ==
The 16 teams were allocated into four pots, with the title holders, Sporting CP, being placed as seeded team in the Group A automatically. The other 3 seeded teams, Porto, Barcelona and Forte dei Marmi, were automatically placed in groups B, C and D, respectively. The rest of the teams were drawn into four groups of four, with the restriction that teams from the same association could not be drawn against each other.

In each group, teams played against each other home-and-away in a home-and-away round-robin format.

A total of six national associations were represented in the group stage.

=== Group A ===
Pos	Team	Pld	W	D	L	GF	GA	GD	Pts	Qualification	LOD	REU	SCP	QUE
1	(Italy) Amatori Lodi (Q)	5	4	0	1	21	11	+10	12	Advance to quarterfinals	—	3–2	5–1	5–4
2	(Spain) Reus Deportiu (Q)	5	3	1	1	17	11	+6	10	Advance to quarterfinals		—	3–3	6–2
3	(Portugal) Sporting CP (E)	5	2	1	2	12	14	−2	7		4–2	2–3	—	
4	(France) Dinan Quévert (E)	5	0	0	5	8	22	−14	0		0–6	1–3	1–2	—

Updated to match(es) played on 15 February 2020. Source: World Skate Europe
(E) Eliminated; (Q) Qualified for the phase indicated

=== Group B ===
Pos	Team	Pld	W	D	L	GF	GA	GD	Pts	Qualification	POR	NOI	MON	BIA
1	(Portugal) Porto (Q)	5	4	0	1	33	12	+21	12	Advance to quarterfinals	—	4–2	10–1	
2	(Spain) Noia	5	3	1	1	26	14	+12	10	Advance to quarterfinals	6–4	—		10–0 (Note: Biasca did not attend to the match.)
3	(Italy) Monza	5	2	1	2	17	22	−5	7		2–3	3–3	—	6–4
4	(Switzerland) Biasca (E)	5	0	0	5	10	38	−28	0		1–12	3–5	2–5	—

Updated to match(es) played on 15 February 2020. Source: World Skate Europe
(E) Eliminated; (Q) Qualified for the phase indicated

=== Group C ===
Pos	Team	Pld	W	D	L	GF	GA	GD	Pts	Qualification	BAR	BEN	SAR	GER
1	(Spain) Barcelona (Q)	5	4	1	0	33	10	+23	13	Advance to quarterfinals	—	5–5	7–1	
2	(Portugal) Benfica (Q)	5	3	1	1	32	14	+18	10	Advance to quarterfinals	2–4	—		14–0
3	(Italy) Sarzana (E)	5	1	1	3	15	32	−17	4		0–10	2–7	—	9–5
4	(Germany) Germania Herringen (E)	5	0	1	4	13	37	−24	1		2–7	3–4	3–3	—

Updated to match(es) played on 15 February 2020. Source: World Skate Europe
(E) Eliminated; (Q) Qualified for the phase indicated

=== Group D ===
Pos	Team	Pld	W	D	L	GF	GA	GD	Pts	Qualification	OLI	LIC	FOR	SOM
1	(Portugal) Oliveirense (Q)	5	4	0	1	19	8	+11	12	Advance to quarterfinals	—		7–2	3–0
2	(Spain) Liceo (Q)	5	4	0	1	19	11	+8	12	Advance to quarterfinals	1–4	—	2–1	5–2
3	(Italy) Forte dei Marmi (E)	5	1	1	3	11	20	−9	4		1–0	2–6	—	
4	(France) Saint-Omer (E)	5	0	1	4	13	23	−10	1		4–5	2–5	5–5	—

Updated to match(es) played on 15 February 2020. Source: World Skate Europe
(E) Eliminated; (Q) Qualified for the phase indicated

== Knockout phase ==
The knockout phase comprises a quarter-final round and a final four tournament with two semi-finals and a final. In the quarter-finals, group stage winners play against group stage runners-up (other than the one from their own group), the latter hosting the first of two legs. The winners qualify for the final four tournament, which will take place at the ground of one of the four finalists.

=== Bracket ===
Quarter-finals
28 March–18 April 2020
Runners-up Group D	0
Winners Group A	0
28 March–18 April 2020
Runners-up Group A	0
Winners Group D	0
28 March–18 April 2020
Runners-up Group C	0
Winners Group B	0
28 March–18 April 2020
Runners-up Group B	0
Winners Group C	0

Semi-finals
16 May 2020
16 May 2020

Final
17 May 2020

== See also ==
- 2019–20 World Skate Europe Cup
- 2019 Rink Hockey Continental Cup
- 2019–20 Rink Hockey European Female League
