= SD Espanyol =

Spanish sport club

- Full name: Secciones Deportives Espanyol
- Founded: 2017
- Based in: Barcelona, Catalonia, Spain
- Colors: Blue and white
- President: Arnau Baqué
- Website: sdespanyol.com

Seccions Deportives Espanyol (transl. Espanyol Sporting Sections) is a multisport club based in Barcelona, Catalonia, Spain. It was founded in 2017 by supporters of football club RCD Espanyol.

== History ==
During several years, football club RCD Espanyol had sections of different sports, being specially notable the sections of rink hockey, 11 times winner of the Copa del Rey, basketball, one-time winner of the Copa del Rey and played ten times in the top-tier, and women's volleyball, three times league champions and five times cup champions. Sections were being disbanded during years and finally Espanyol dedicated only to football.

In March 2017, the Association of Supporters and Shareholders of RCD Espanyol boosted a project for recovering the sporting sections of the club, but this time without any economic link with the football team. The new multisports club was created with the name of Seccions Deportives Espanyol (Sporting sections Espanyol).

Two months later, the Association confirmed that Espanyol would start competing with a rink hockey team in the 2017–18 fifth tier. The club also would launch a women's volleyball team.

For its second season, after the promotion of the rink hockey club to the fourth tier, the club would expand its sections to handball and basketball.

== Basketball ==
=== Season by season ===
Season	Tier	Division	Pos.	W–L
2018–19	3ª Catalana	8	1st	23-3
2019–20	2ª Catalana	7	1st	18-2
2020-21	1ª Catalana	6	1st	7-3
2021-22	Copa Catalunya (Fase Previa)	5	5th	14-8
2021-22	Copa Catalunya (Fase Permanencia)	5	1st	4-2
2022-23	Copa Catalunya (Fase Previa)	5	5th	6-4

== Roller hockey ==
=== Season by season ===
Season	Tier	Division	Pos.
2017–18	5	2ª Catalana	1st
2018–19	4	1ª Catalana	3rd
