= Eurockey Cup =

- Founded: 2012 (U15); 2014 (U17); 2021 (FEM15)
- Region: Europe
- Teams: 16
- Current champions: U15 – 2025 (Spain) FC Barcelona (4th title); FEM15 - 2025 (Spain) HC Salt (1st title); U17 – 2025 (Portugal) SL Benfica (3rd title)
- Website: Official website

Eurockey Cup is a European roller hockey club competition for youth players. It is an initiative of Eurockey.com company and supported by the CERH, the Royal Spanish Roller Skating Federation and the Catalonia Roller Skating Federation.

The participating teams are invited by the organization, while being taken into consideration their respective National Leagues classification for each season, in order to replicate the spirit of the CERH European League. The competition comprises itself into two youth categories, one for the under-15 (since 2012) and another for the under-17 players (since 2014).

== Eurockey Cup U-15 ==
Eurockey Cup U-15 (also referred as U-15 Roller Hockey Champions League) is a European roller hockey club competition for under-15 players.

=== Editions and Winners ===
Year	Ed.	Place	Winner	Runner-up	Losing semi-finalists		Ref.
2025	13th	(Spain) Lloret de Mar/Blanes	(Spain) FC Barcelona	(Portugal) SL Benfica	(Portugal) UD Oliveirense and (Italy) Roller Bassano		
2024	12th	(Spain) Lloret de Mar/Blanes	(Spain) FC Barcelona	(Portugal) UD Oliveirense	(Portugal) SL Benfica and (Italy) Pumas Viareggio		
2023	11th	(Spain) Lloret de Mar/Blanes	(Spain) FC Barcelona	(Portugal) UD Oliveirense	(Portugal) SL Benfica and (Italy) Roller Bassano		
2022	10th	(Spain) Lloret de Mar/Blanes	(Spain) FC Barcelona	(Portugal) SL Benfica	(Portugal) FC Porto and (Portugal) AD Oeiras		
2021	9th	(Spain) Lloret de Mar/Blanes	(Portugal) SL Benfica	(Portugal) Sporting CP	(Italy) Follonica Hockey and (Portugal) SL Benfica		
Year	Ed.	Place	Winner	Runner-up	3rd place	4th place	Ref.
2019	8th	(Spain) Vilanova i la Geltrú	(Portugal) AD Valongo	(Spain) CH Caldes	(Spain) CP Vilanova	(Portugal) FC Porto	
2018	7th	(Spain) Vilanova i la Geltrú	(Portugal) CD Paço d'Arcos	(Spain) CP Vilanova	(Portugal) SL Benfica	(France) La Vendéenne	
2017	6th	(Spain) Vilanova i la Geltrú	(Portugal) Sporting CP	(Spain) FC Barcelona	(Spain) CP Manlleu	(Italy) Follonica Hockey	
2016	5th	(Spain) Vilanova i la Geltrú	(Portugal) FC Porto	(Spain) CP Manlleu	(Italy) SPV Viareggio	(Portugal) SL Benfica	
2015	4th	(Spain) Vilanova i la Geltrú	(Spain) CE Arenys de Munt	(Italy) Follonica Hockey	(Portugal) SL Benfica	(Spain) HC Sentmenat	
2014	3rd	(Spain) Vilanova i la Geltrú	(Spain) CE Arenys de Munt	(Spain) SHUM Maçanet	(Spain) CP Vilanova	(Italy) Hockey Breganze	
2013	2nd	(Spain) Vilanova i la Geltrú	(Spain) Reus Deportiu	(Portugal) Sporting CP	(Italy) Hockey Breganze	(Spain) CH Caldes	
2012	1st	(Spain) Vilanova i la Geltrú	(Italy) UVP Mirandola e Modena	(Spain) CAA Dominicos	(Italy) Hockey Breganze	(Spain) CP Voltregà	

=== Medal table ===
Rank	Nation	Gold	Silver	Bronze	Total
1	(Spain) FC Barcelona	4	1	0	5
2	(Spain) CE Arenys de Munt	2	0	0	2
3	(Portugal) SL Benfica	1	2	2	5
4	(Portugal) Sporting CP	1	2	0	3
5	(Portugal) AD Valongo	1	0	0	1
5	(Portugal) CD Paço d'Arcos	1	0	0	1
5	(Portugal) FC Porto	1	0	0	1
5	(Spain) Reus Deportiu	1	0	0	1
5	(Italy) UVP Mirandola e Modena	1	0	0	1
10	(Portugal) UD Oliveirense	0	2	0	2
11	(Spain) CP Vilanova	0	1	2	3
12	(Spain) CP Manlleu	0	1	1	2
13	(Spain) AA Dominicos	0	1	0	1
13	(Spain) CH Caldes	0	1	0	1
13	(Italy) Follonica Hockey	0	1	0	1
13	(Spain) SHUM Maçanet	0	1	0	1
17	(Italy) Hockey Breganze	0	0	2	2
18	(Italy) SPV Viareggio	0	0	1	1
Totals (18 entries)		13	13	8	34

== Eurockey Cup FEM-15 ==
Eurockey Cup FEM-15 (also referred as FEM-15 Roller Hockey Champions League) is a European roller hockey club competition for under-15 female players.

=== Editions and Winners ===
Year	Ed.	Place	Winner	Runner-up	Losing semi-finalists	
2025	5th	(Spain) Lloret de Mar/Blanes	(Spain) HC Salt	(Spain) HC Palau de Plegamans	(Spain) Cerdanyola CH and (Spain) HPR Team	
2024	4th	(Spain) Lloret de Mar/Blanes	(Spain) Cerdanyola CH	(Spain) CP Cubelles	(Spain) Cerdanyola CH and (Spain) CP Vila-sana	
2023	3rd	(Spain) Lloret de Mar/Blanes	(Spain) CP Manlleu	(Spain) HC Palau de Plegamans	(France) Rink Atlantik and (Spain) CH Caldes	
2022	2nd	(Spain) Lloret de Mar/Blanes	(Spain) CP Manlleu	(Spain) PHC Sant Cugat	(Portugal) AA Coimbra and (Spain) CHP Bigues i Riells	
Year	Ed.	Place	Winner	Runner-up	3rd place	4th place
2021	1st	(Spain) Lloret de Mar/Blanes	(Spain) CP Vilanova	(Spain) CH Caldes	(Italy) RS Cornedo	(Spain) CP Manlleu

=== Medal table ===
Rank	Nation	Gold	Silver	Bronze	Total
1	(Spain) CP Manlleu	2	0	0	2
2	(Spain) CP Vilanova	1	0	0	1
2	(Spain) Cerdanyola CH	1	0	0	1
2	(Spain) HC Salt	1	0	0	1
5	(Spain) HC Palau de Plegamans	0	2	0	2
6	(Spain) CH Caldes	0	1	0	1
6	(Spain) CP Cubelles	0	1	0	1
8	(Italy) RS Cornedo	0	0	1	1
Totals (8 entries)		5	4	1	10

== Eurockey Cup U-17 ==
Eurockey Cup U-17 (also referred as U-17 Roller Hockey Champions League) is a European roller hockey club competition for under-17 players.

=== Editions and Winners ===
Year	Ed.	Place	Winner	Runner-up	Losing semi-finalists		Ref.
2025	11th	(Spain) Lloret de Mar/Blanes	(Portugal) SL Benfica	(Spain) FC Barcelona	(Portugal) UD Oliveirense and (Portugal) AD Valongo		
2024	10th	(Spain) Lloret de Mar/Blanes	(Portugal) AD Valongo	(Portugal) SL Benfica	(Portugal) UD Oliveirense and (Spain) FC Barcelona		
2023	9th	(Spain) Lloret de Mar/Blanes	(Portugal) UD Oliveirense	(Portugal) AD Valongo	(Portugal) Sporting CP and (Spain) FC Barcelona		
2022	8th	(Spain) Lloret de Mar/Blanes	(Portugal) UD Oliveirense	(Portugal) AD Valongo	(Spain) CE Noia and (Portugal) HC Turquel		
2021	7th	(Spain) Lloret de Mar/Blanes	(Portugal) UD Oliveirense	(Spain) Igualada HC	(Spain) CP Alcobendas and (Portugal) FC Porto		
Year	Ed.	Place	Winner	Runner-up	3rd place	4th place	Ref.
2019	6th	(Spain) Blanes	(Portugal) SL Benfica	(Spain) CP Manlleu	(Spain) FC Barcelona	(Spain) CP Alcobendas	
2018	5th	(Spain) Blanes	(Portugal) SL Benfica	(Portugal) Sporting CP	(Spain) CH Caldes	(Portugal) AD Valongo	
2017	4th	(Spain) Blanes	(Spain) FC Barcelona	(Italy) Follonica Hockey	(Portugal) FC Porto	(Portugal) Sporting CP	
2016	3rd	(Spain) Blanes	(Spain) ICG Lleida	(Spain) CE Arenys de Munt	(Portugal) SL Benfica	(Spain) CP Manlleu	
2015	2nd	(Spain) Blanes	(Spain) CP Manlleu	(Spain) FC Barcelona	(Spain) HC Braga	(Spain) CAA Dominicos	
2014	1st	(Spain) Vilanova i la Geltrú	(Portugal) HC Braga	(Italy) UVP Mirandola e Modena	(Spain) FC Barcelona	(Spain) CP Manlleu	

=== Medal table ===
Rank	Nation	Gold	Silver	Bronze	Total
1	(Portugal) SL Benfica	3	1	1	5
2	(Portugal) UD Oliveirense	3	0	0	3
3	(Spain) FC Barcelona	1	2	2	5
4	(Portugal) AD Valongo	1	2	0	3
5	(Spain) CP Manlleu	1	1	0	2
6	(Portugal) HC Braga	1	0	0	1
6	(Spain) ICG Lleida	1	0	0	1
8	(Spain) CE Arenys de Munt	0	1	0	1
8	(Italy) Follonica Hockey	0	1	0	1
8	(Spain) Igualada HC	0	1	0	1
8	(Portugal) Sporting CP	0	1	0	1
8	(Italy) UVP Mirandola e Modena	0	1	0	1
13	(Spain) AC Ordenes	0	0	1	1
13	(Spain) CH Caldes	0	0	1	1
13	(Portugal) FC Porto	0	0	1	1
Totals (15 entries)		11	11	6	28
