= 2018–19 Rink Hockey Euroleague =

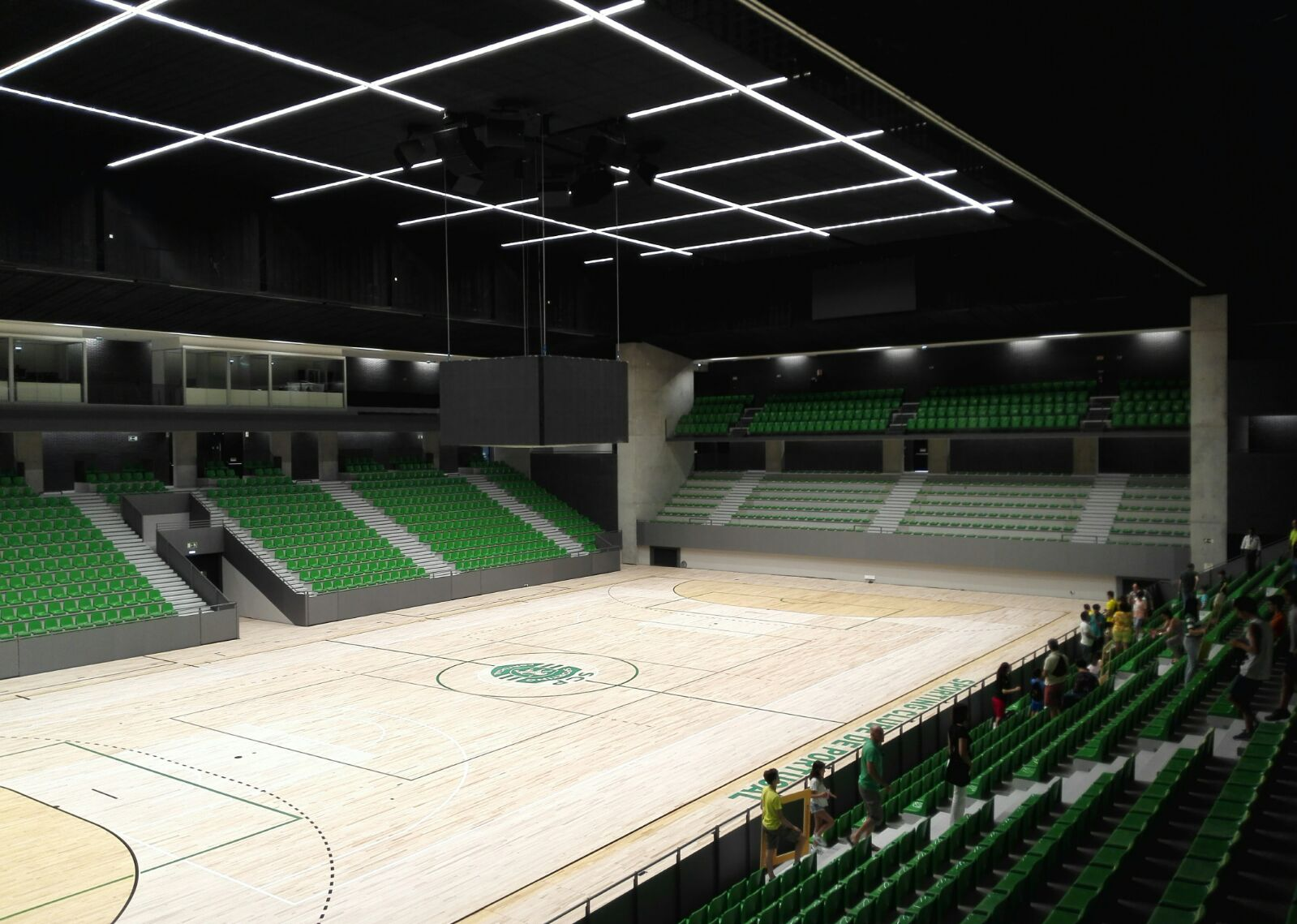
- The Pavilhão João Rocha in Lisbon hosted the Final Four.

Tournament details
- Dates: 20 October 2018 – 20 May 2019
- Teams: 16 (from 6 associations)

Final positions
- Champions: (Portugal) Sporting CP (2nd title)
- Runners-up: (Portugal) Porto

The 2018–19 Rink Hockey Euroleague is the 54th season of Europe's premier club roller hockey tournament organised by World Skate Europe-Rink Hockey Committee, and the 22nd season since it was renamed from European Champion Clubs' Cup to Euroleague.

The defending champions Barcelona were eliminated by Porto in the semi-finals. In the final, Sporting CP beat Porto 5–2 to win their second trophy in the competition, while Porto lost their 10th consecutive final and 12th overall.

== Team allocation ==
=== Association ranking ===
For the 2018–19 Rink Hockey Euroleague, the associations were allocated places according to their coefficient, which takes into account the performance of each association's representative teams in European competitions between the 2014–15 and the 2017–18 seasons. The coefficient is calculated by dividing the total of points accumulated by the number of participating teams.

Participation is reserved to teams from associations that have an effective capacity to organise annually their own national championships. They will all have at least one team entering the competition. To allocate the other nine places, the D'Hondt method was applied to the coefficient of each association. In case of withdrawals, priority would be given according to the order established by the D'Hondt method.

Rank	Association	Coefficient	Teams	D'Hondt points		
1	Portugal	19.903	4	9.952	6.634	4.976
2	Spain	19.472	4	9.736	6.491	4.868
3	Italy	15.588	3	7.794	5.196	3.897
4	France	9.292	2	4.646	3.097	2.323
5	Germany	6.000	1	3.000	2.000	1.500
6	Switzerland	5.958	1	2.979	1.986	1.490
7	England	3.000	1	1.500	1.000	0.750

=== Teams ===
League positions of the previous season shown in parentheses (TH: Title holders). As English champions King's Lynn resigned to its place, that was occupied by a fourth Italian team following the allocation criteria.

Group stage
(Portugal) Sporting CP (1st)	(Spain) Barcelona^{TH} (1st)	(Italy) Amatori Lodi (1st)	(France) Quévert (1st)
(Portugal) Benfica (2nd)	(Spain) Liceo (2nd)	(Italy) Forte dei Marmi (2nd)	(France) Saint-Omer (2nd)
(Portugal) Porto (3rd)	(Spain) Reus (3rd)	(Italy) Follonica (CW)	(Germany) Germania Herringen (1st)
(Portugal) Oliveirense (4th)	(Spain) Noia (4th)	(Italy) Monza (8th)	(Switzerland) Montreux (1st)

== Round dates ==
The schedule of the competition is as follows.

Phase	Round	First leg	Second leg
Group stage	Matchday 1	20 October 2018	
Group stage	Matchday 2	17 November 2018	
Group stage	Matchday 3	1 December 2018	
Group stage	Matchday 4	19 January 2019	
Group stage	Matchday 5	16 February 2019	
Group stage	Matchday 6	9 March 2019	
Knockout phase	Quarter-finals	23 March 2019	6 April 2019
Knockout phase	Semi-finals	11 May 2019	
Knockout phase	Final	12 May 2019	

== Draw ==
The 16 teams were allocated into four pots, with the title holders, Reus Deportiu, being placed directly as head-team of the Group A. The other three seeded teams will be from the three top ranked federations according to these priorities:

1. National champions of those leagues.
2. Highest ranked teams.

In each group, teams played against each other home-and-away in a home-and-away round-robin format.

== Group stage ==
The 16 teams were allocated into four pots, with the title holders, Reus Deportiu, being placed as seeded team in the Group A automatically. The other 3 seeded teams, Porto, Barcelona and Amatori Lodi, were automatically placed in groups B, C and D, respectively. The rest of the teams were drawn into four groups of four, with the restriction that teams from the same association could not be drawn against each other.

In each group, teams played against each other home-and-away in a home-and-away round-robin format.

A total of six national associations were represented in the group stage.

=== Group A ===
Pos	Team	Pld	W	D	L	PF	PA	PD	Pts	Qualification	BAR	OLI	FOL	QUE
1	(Spain) Barcelona	6	5	0	1	35	16	+19	15	Advance to quarterfinals	—	7–6	9–2	7–2
2	(Portugal) Oliveirense	6	3	0	3	26	25	+1	9	Advance to quarterfinals	4–2	—	6–5	6–4
3	(Italy) Follonica	6	3	0	3	17	26	−9	9		0–4	3–2	—	4–3
4	(France) Quévert	6	1	0	5	17	28	−11	3		2–6	4–2	2–3	—

Source: World Skate Europe

=== Group B ===
Pos	Team	Pld	W	D	L	PF	PA	PD	Pts	Qualification	SPO	FOR	LIC	GER
1	(Portugal) Sporting CP	6	5	1	0	27	8	+19	16	Advance to quarterfinals	—	2–1	6–4	10–2
2	(Italy) Forte dei Marmi	6	3	1	2	22	11	+11	10	Advance to quarterfinals	0–0	—	5–2	6–0
3	(Spain) Liceo	6	3	0	3	24	24	0	9		1–4	6–3	—	8–4
4	(Germany) Germania Herringen	6	0	0	6	9	39	−30	0		0–5	1–7	2–3	—

Source: World Skate Europe

=== Group C ===
Pos	Team	Pld	W	D	L	PF	PA	PD	Pts	Qualification	POR	LOD	REU	SOM
1	(Portugal) Porto	6	4	2	0	29	15	+14	14	Advance to quarterfinals	—	8–3	6–3	6–2
2	(Italy) Amatori Lodi	6	3	1	2	20	18	+2	10	Advance to quarterfinals	1–1	—	3–1	7–1
3	(Spain) Reus Deportiu	6	3	0	3	19	20	−1	9		2–4	6–3	—	5–3
4	(France) Saint-Omer	6	0	1	5	12	27	−15	1		4–4	1–3	1–2	—

Source: World Skate Europe

=== Group D ===
Pos	Team	Pld	W	D	L	PF	PA	PD	Pts	Qualification	BEN	NOI	MON	MNX
1	(Portugal) Benfica	6	5	1	0	32	11	+21	16	Advance to quarterfinals	—	4–4	3–1	10–2
2	(Spain) Noia	6	3	1	2	24	12	+12	10	Advance to quarterfinals	1–2	—	7–2	6–0
3	(Italy) Monza	6	3	0	3	15	18	−3	9		0–5	4–0	—	6–2
4	(Switzerland) Montreux	6	0	0	6	8	38	−30	0		3–8	0–6	1–2	—

Source: World Skate Europe

== Knockout phase ==
The knockout phase comprises a quarter-final round and a final four tournament with two semi-finals and a final. In the quarter-finals, group stage winners play against group stage runners-up (other than the one from their own group), the latter hosting the first of two legs. The winners qualify for the final four tournament, which will take place at the ground of one of the four finalists.

=== Bracket ===
Quarter-finals
(Spain) Noia	3	0	3
(Spain) Barcelona	4	7	11
(Italy) Forte dei Marmi	1	2	3
(Portugal) Porto	5	3	8
(Italy) Amatori Lodi	3	2	5
(Portugal) Sporting CP	5	8	13
(Portugal) Oliveirense	2	1	3
(Portugal) Benfica	3	3	6

Semi-finals
(Spain) Barcelona	1 (0)
(Portugal) Porto (pen.)	1 (1)
(Portugal) Sporting CP	5
(Portugal) Benfica	4

Final
(Portugal) Porto	2
(Portugal) Sporting CP	5

=== Quarter-finals ===
Team 1	Agg.	Team 2	1st leg	2nd leg
Noia (Spain)	3–11	(Spain) Barcelona	3–4	0–7
Amatori Lodi (Italy)	5–13	(Portugal) Sporting CP	3–5	2–8
Forte dei Marmi (Italy)	3–8	(Portugal) Porto	1–5	2–3
Oliveirense (Portugal)	3–6	(Portugal) Benfica	2–3	1–3

=== Final four ===
The final four tournament is taking place at Pavilhão João Rocha in Lisbon, Portugal, on 11–12 May 2019. The home ground of Sporting CP, one of the teams qualified for the final four, was selected as the host venue on 18 April. It is the first time that the Euroleague final four is played in this venue, and the second time it is hosted in Lisbon, after the 2016 edition was played at Benfica's Pavilhão Fidelidade.

All times are local time (WEST or UTC+02:00).

==== Semi-finals ====
11 May 2019
12:00

Barcelona (Spain)	1–1 (a.e.t.)	(Portugal) Porto
Matias Pascual 4'	Report	Gonçalo Alves 29'
Penalties
João Rodrigues (penalty missed); Pablo Álvarez (penalty missed); Ignacio Alabart (penalty missed); Marc Gual (penalty missed); Pau Bargalló (penalty missed)	0–1	(penalty missed) Gonçalo Alves; (penalty missed) Poka; (penalty missed) Reinaldo Garcia; (penalty scored) Hélder Nunes; (penalty missed) Telmo Pinto

Pavilhão João Rocha, Lisbon
Referee: Luca Molli (Italy), Claudio Ferraro (Italy)

11 May 2019
18:00

Sporting CP (Portugal)	5–4	(Portugal) Benfica
Pedro Gil 8'; Matias Platero 16', 23'; Henrique Magalhães 41'; Gonzalo Romero 49'	Report	Diogo Rafael 16', 43'; Carlos Nicolía 44'; Lucas Ordoñez 47'

Pavilhão João Rocha, Lisbon
Referee: Ivan González (Spain), Miguel Diaz (Spain)

==== Final ====
12 May 2019
18:00

Porto (Portugal)	2–5	(Portugal) Sporting CP
Nalo García 7'; Gonçalo Alves 39'	Report	Antonio Pérez 6'; Vitor Hugo 9'; Ferran Font 11'; Gonzalo Romero 23'; Ferran Font 41'

Pavilhão João Rocha, Lisbon
Referee: Alessandro Eccelsi (Italy), Joseph Silecchia (Italy)

== See also ==
- 2018–19 World Skate Europe Cup
- 2018 CERH Continental Cup
- 2018–19 CERH Women's European Cup
- World Skate Europe - all competitions
