= Asturhockey CP =

Spanish roller hockey team

Asturhockey
- Full name: Asturhockey Club Patín
- Founded: 2015
- Home ground: Polideportivo Municipal; Grado, Asturias (Capacity 1,000)

Personnel
- Chairman: Adrián Fernández
- Manager: David Miranda
Home	Away

Asturhockey Club Patín is a Spanish roller hockey team based in Grado, Asturias. It was founded in 2015.

== History ==
Asturhockey Club Patín was founded in 2015 by a group of supporters of the local and historic team CP Areces, who disagreed with the board of directors after the relegation of the club to the third tier.

In their first season, the club finished as regional champion and promoted to Primera División, the second tier. They would repeat success on 20 May 2017, when they achieved promotion to OK Liga, Spanish first division, by finishing as runners-up of Primera División. However, the club was relegated after finishing in the last position of the league in their debut season and, two months later, the club resigned to play in the second division.

Two years later, in May 2019, the newly created women's teams achieved promotion to the OK Liga Femenina.

After this success, Asturhockey and CP Areces agreed to merge after a four-year separation.

== Season to season ==
=== Men's team ===
Season	Tier	Division	Pos.
2015–16	3	Autonómica	1st
2016–17	2	1ª División	2nd
2017–18	1	OK Liga	16th
2018–19	3	Autonómica	1st
2018–19	3	OK Bronce	5th

=== Women's team ===
Season	Tier	Division	Pos.
2018–19	3	Autonómica	2nd
