= 2012 Eurockey Cup U-15 =

2012 2012 Eurockey Cup U-15
Tournament details
- Host country: Spain
- Dates: 1–4 November
- Teams: 13 (from 1 confederation)
- Venue(s): (in Vilanova i la Geltrú host cities)

Final positions
- Champions: (Italy) UVP Mirandola e Modena (1st title)
- Runners-up: (Spain) AA Dominicos
- Third place: (Italy) Hockey Breganze
- Fourth place: (Spain) CP Voltregá

Tournament statistics
- Matches played: 34
- Goals scored: 233 (6.85 per match)
- Top scorer(s): (Italy) Francesco Compagno
- Best player(s): (Spain) Alejandro Soto Rodríguez

The 2012 Eurockey Cup U-15 was the 1st edition of the Eurockey Cup U-15. It was held in November 2012 in Vilanova i la Geltrú, in Spain.

== Teams ==
| CP Voltregá (Spain Champion) | HF Sant Josep (Spain runner-up) | AA Dominicos (Spain 3rd place) | Rivas las Lagunas (Spain 4th) | (Spain) CP Vilanova (Host) |
| (Italy) UVP Mirandola e Modena (Italia Champion) | (Italy) Hockey Trissino (Italia runner-up) | (Italy) Hockey Breganze (Italia 3rd place) | | |
| US Vilejuif (France Champion) | Quintin RC (France runner-up | | | |
| (Switzerland) RSC Uttigen (Swiss Champion) | | | | |
HC Andorra (Andorra Champion)
RHC Dornbirn (Austria Champion)

== Group stage ==
=== Groupo A ===
| Team | Pts | Pld | W | D | L | GF | GA | GD |
|---|---|---|---|---|---|---|---|---|
| (Spain) HF Sant Josep | 6 | 3 | 2 | 0 | 1 | 11 | 5 | 6 |
| (Spain) Rivas las Lagunas | 6 | 3 | 2 | 0 | 1 | 9 | 7 | 2 |
| (Italy) Hockey Trissino | 3 | 3 | 2 | 0 | 2 | 16 | 16 | 0 |
| (Austria) RHC Dornbirn | 3 | 3 | 1 | 0 | 2 | 8 | 16 | -8 |

| | SAN | RIV | TRI | DOR |
|---|---|---|---|---|
| HF Sant Josep (Spain) | – | 2-0 | 7-2 | - |
| Rivas las Lagunas (Spain) | - | – | - | 3-2 |
| Hockey Trissino (Italy) | - | 3-6 | – | 11-3 |
| RHC Dornbirn (Austria) | 3-2 | - | - | – |

=== Group B ===
| Team | Pts | Pld | W | D | L | GF | GA | GD |
|---|---|---|---|---|---|---|---|---|
| (Italy) UVP Mirandola e Modena | 9 | 3 | 3 | 0 | 0 | 9 | 4 | 5 |
| | 4 | 3 | 1 | 1 | 1 | 14 | 4 | 10 |
| HC Andorra | 4 | 3 | 1 | 1 | 1 | 7 | 2 | 5 |
| (France) Quintin RC | 0 | 3 | 0 | 0 | 3 | 4 | 24 | -20 |

| | MIR | VOL | AND | QUI |
|---|---|---|---|---|
| UVP Mirandola e Modena (Italy) | – | - | 6-3 | 1-0 |
| CP Voltregá (Spain) | 1-2 | – | 1-1 | - |
| HC Andorra | - | - | – | 6-0 |
| Quintin RC (France) | - | 1-12 | - | – |

=== Group C ===
| Team | Pts | Pld | W | D | L | GF | GA | GD |
|---|---|---|---|---|---|---|---|---|
| (Spain) AA Dominicos | 10 | 4 | 3 | 1 | 0 | 14 | 5 | 9 |
| (Italy) Hockey Breganze | 9 | 4 | 3 | 0 | 1 | 21 | 4 | 17 |
| (France) US Villejuif | 7 | 4 | 2 | 1 | 1 | 14 | 11 | 3 |
| (Spain) CP Vilanova | 3 | 4 | 1 | 0 | 3 | 8 | 17 | -9 |
| (Switzerland) RSC Uttigen | 0 | 4 | 0 | 0 | 4 | 5 | 23 | -23 |

| | DOM | BRE | USV | CPV | UTT |
|---|---|---|---|---|---|
| AA Dominicos (Spain) | – | 3-0 | - | - | 6-2 |
| Hockey Breganze (Italy) | - | – | - | 8-1 | 6-0 |
| US Villejuif (France) | 3-3 | - | – | - | 6-1 |
| CP Vilanova (Spain) | 0-2 | - | 1-5 | – | - |
| RSC Uttigen Switzerland | - | 0-7 | - | 2-5 | – |

== Final stage ==
=== Championship ===
Quarter-finals
3-Nov 9:00
(Spain) HF Sant Josep | 2
(Spain) CP Voltrerá | 5
3-Nov 10:10
(Spain) AA Dominicos | 4
HC Andorra | 3
3-Nov 11:20
(Spain) Rivas las Lagunas | 4
(Italy) Hockey Breganze | 6
3-Nov 12:30
(Italy) UVP Mirandola e Modena | 4
(France) US Vilejuif | 2

Semi-finals
3-Nov 18:00
(Spain) CP Voltregá | 2
(Spain) AA Dominicos | 3
3-Nov 19:15
(Italy) Hockey Breganze | 2
(Italy) UVP Mirandola e Modena | 5

Final
4-Nov 11:00
(Spain) AA Dominicos | 2
(Italy) UVP Mirandola e Modena | 5
Third place
4-Nov 9:30
(Spain) CP Voltregá | 2
(Italy) Hockey Breganze | 3

=== 9th - 13th place ===
| | Res | |
|---|---|---|
| RHC Dornbirn (Austria) | 4-7 | (France) Quintin RC |
| Hockey Trissino (Italy) | 6-3 | (Spain) CP Vilanova |
| RSC Uttigen (Switzerland) | 3-7 | (Austria) RHC Dornbirn |
| Quintin RC (France) | 0-9 | (Italy) Hockey Trissino |

== Final standing ==
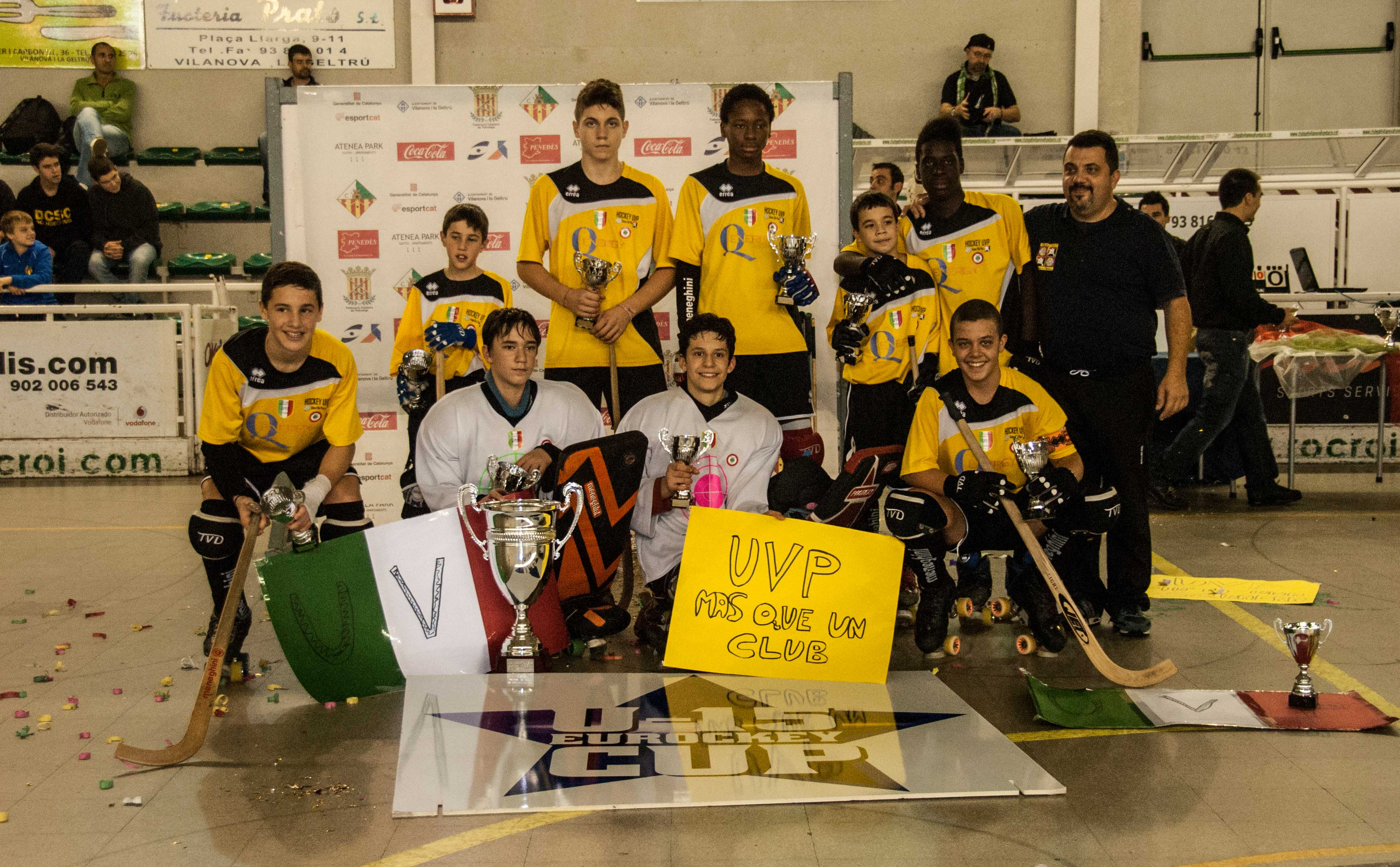
UVP Mirandola e Modena

| Rank | Team |
|---|---|
| Gold medal | (Italy) UVP Mirandola e Modena |
| Silver medal | (Spain) AA Dominicos |
| Bronze medal | (Italy) Hockey Breganze |
| 4 | (Spain) CP Voltregá |
| 5 | (Spain) HF Sant Josep |
| 5 | HC Andorra |
| 5 | (Spain) Rivas las Lagunas |
| 5 | (France) US Vilejuif |
| 9 | (France) Quintin RC |
| 9 | (Austria) RHC Dornbirn |
| 9 | (Italy) Hockey Trissino |
| 12 | (Switzerland) RSC Uttigen |
| 12 | (Spain) CP Vilanova |

2012 European Champions
UVP Mirandola e Modena
1st
