= 2017–18 OK Liga =

OK Liga
- Season: 2017–18
- Dates: 7 October 2017–27 May 2018
- Champions: Barcelona Lassa
- Relegated: Arenys de Munt; Corredor Mató Palafrugell; Asturhockey
- European League: Barcelona Lassa; Liceo; Reus Deportiu; Noia Freixenet
- CERS Cup: ICG Software Lleida; Igualada Rigat; Citylift Girona; Voltregà; Recam Làser Caldes
- Matches played: 240
- Goals scored: 1,477 (6.15 per match)
- Top goalscorer: Raül Marín (58 goals)
- Biggest home win: Liceo 11–1 Asturhockey (15 October 2017); Barcelona 10–0 Vic (1 May 2018)
- Biggest away win: Asturhockey 1–9 Barcelona (7 October 2017)
- Highest scoring: Lleida 13–4 Palafrugell (15 April 2018)

The 2017–18 OK Liga is the 49th season of the top-tier league of rink hockey in Spain. It will start on 7 October 2017 and will finish on 27 May 2018.

== Teams ==
Non-Catalan teams 2017–18 teams
Catalan teams in OK Liga 2017–18 season

Team	Arena	City/Area
Arenys de Munt	Pavelló Municipal	Arenys de Munt
Asturhockey	Polideportivo Municipal	Grado
Barcelona Lassa	Palau Blaugrana	Barcelona
Citylift Girona	Palau II	Girona
Corredor Mató Palafrugell	Pavelló Municipal	Palafrugell
ICG Software Lleida	Onze de Setembre	Lleida
Igualada Rigat	Les Comes	Igualada
Liceo	Riazor	A Coruña
Lloret Vila Esportiva	Pavelló Municipal	Lloret de Mar
Noia Freixenet	Pavelló Olímpic	Sant Sadurní d'Anoia
PAS Alcoy	Francisco Laporta	Alcoy
Recam Làser Caldes	Torre Roja	Caldes de Montbui
Reus Deportiu	Pavelló del Reus Deportiu	Reus
Vendrell	Pavelló Municipal	El Vendrell
Vic	Pavelló Olímpic	Vic
Voltregà	Victorià Oliveras de la Riva	Sant Hipòlit de Voltregà

== League table ==
Pos	Team	Pld	W	D	L	GF	GA	GD	Pts	Qualification or relegation
1	Barcelona Lassa (C)	30	25	4	1	147	47	+100	79	Qualification to European League
2	Liceo	30	22	2	6	133	66	+67	68	Qualification to European League
3	Reus Deportiu	30	22	1	7	148	87	+61	67	Qualification to European League
4	Noia Freixenet	30	15	8	7	105	75	+30	53	Qualification to European League
5	ICG Software Lleida	30	16	4	10	122	92	+30	52	Qualification to CERS Cup
6	Igualada Rigat	30	15	3	12	85	73	+12	48	Qualification to CERS Cup
7	Citylift Girona	30	13	5	12	89	86	+3	44	Qualification to CERS Cup
8	Voltregà	30	12	8	10	84	89	−5	44	Qualification to CERS Cup
9	Recam Làser Caldes	30	13	5	12	74	86	−12	44	Qualification to CERS Cup
10	Vendrell	30	13	5	12	82	87	−5	44	
11	Vic	30	8	9	13	68	90	−22	33	
12	Lloret Vila Esportiva	30	8	7	15	69	91	−22	31	
13	PAS Alcoy	30	9	4	17	81	105	−24	31	
14	Arenys de Munt (R)	30	5	4	21	57	124	−67	19	Relegation to Primera División
15	Corredor Mató Palafrugell (R)	30	4	3	23	69	129	−60	15	Relegation to Primera División
16	Asturhockey (R)	30	3	2	25	64	150	−86	11	Relegation to Primera División

Source: FEP.es
(C) Champions; (R) Relegated

== Results ==
Home \ Away	ARE	AST	BAR	GIR	PAL	LLE	IGU	LIC	LLO	NOI	ALC	CAL	REU	VEN	VIC	VOL
Arenys de Munt	—	4–5	3–9	3–4	3–2	1–6	2–3	0–4	2–2	0–3	1–3	2–6	1–6	0–5	2–2	4–3
Asturhockey	2–4	—	1–9	2–3	2–2	1–6	1–4	1–5	4–1	1–5	3–2	2–3	4–6	2–4	3–4	3–3
Barcelona Lassa	2–0	10–1	—	4–3	7–1	4–1	2–0	3–1	8–2	2–2	6–1	7–2	6–0	5–1	10–0	5–5
Citylift Girona	3–1	6–1	4–7	—	3–2	1–2	2–1	2–4	4–0	2–2	6–1	4–2	3–5	2–5	4–1	2–2
Corredor Mató Palafrugell	6–7	7–4	0–7	1–3	—	0–3	1–4	3–5	4–5	4–5	1–3	3–2	2–8	1–1	2–2	2–5
ICG Software Lleida	5–0	6–2	2–4	5–2	13–4	—	2–2	2–9	3–3	6–3	4–3	4–1	6–3	6–6	1–2	3–4
Igualada Rigat	3–0	5–2	4–6	1–3	5–0	1–4	—	2–4	5–5	4–5	8–4	3–1	4–3	0–2	2–2	4–2
Liceo	9–2	11–1	2–2	1–0	4–2	3–5	6–2	—	5–0	4–2	8–0	7–3	3–2	4–0	7–1	2–3
Lloret Vila Esportiva	4–1	2–1	0–1	6–4	1–0	6–5	0–3	2–3	—	2–2	3–3	2–3	3–4	2–3	2–1	2–2
Noia Freixenet	9–3	7–4	3–4	8–3	7–2	3–3	2–0	2–3	3–3	—	4–0	1–1	0–4	2–1	5–2	5–0
PAS Alcoy	5–3	4–2	2–5	2–1	5–6	6–3	1–3	3–4	0–2	3–3	—	1–1	0–3	2–2	5–1	6–2
Recam Làser Caldes	2–2	3–1	0–1	1–1	3–1	5–4	1–2	1–3	3–2	2–1	3–2	—	2–4	4–2	2–1	4–4
Reus Deportiu	5–1	7–5	3–2	6–2	4–3	3–1	4–6	6–6	6–3	4–5	4–2	10–3	—	7–1	9–4	8–0
Vendrell	3–1	5–1	0–5	4–6	3–2	4–5	1–2	4–1	3–2	2–2	4–8	6–4	3–2	—	2–1	2–4
Vic	2–2	6–0	3–3	3–3	4–3	2–3	2–0	3–1	2–0	0–2	6–3	1–2	4–6	3–3	—	2–2
Voltregà	1–2	6–2	0–1	3–3	1–2	4–3	3–2	7–4	3–2	6–2	3–1	2–4	2–6	1–0	1–1	—

Source: FEP.es statistics center
Legend: Blue = home team win; Yellow = draw; Red = away team win.

== Top goalscorers ==
Raül Marín beat the record of goals in a season with 58.

Rank	Player	Team	Goals
1	(Spain) Raül Marín	Reus Deportiu	58
2	(Spain) Pablo Álvarez	Barcelona Lassa	45
3	(France) Carlo di Benedetto	Liceo	28
4	(Argentina) Darío Giménez	ICG Software Lleida	27
4	(Argentina) Maximiliano Oruste	PAS Alcoy	27
6	(Spain) Jordi Ferrer	Vendrell	17
6	(Spain) Raül Pelícano	Citylift Girona	17
6	(Spain) Sergi Pla	Igualada Rigat	17
6	(Spain) Marc Torra	Reus Deportiu	17
6	(Spain) David Torres	Liceo	17

== Copa del Rey ==
2018 Copa del Rey
Tournament details
- Arena: Pavelló Municipal, Lloret de Mar
- Dates: 22–25 February 2018

Final positions
- Champions: Barcelona Lassa (22nd title)
- Runners-up: Liceo

The 2018 Copa del Rey was the 75th edition of the Spanish men's roller-hockey cup. The tournament was hosted in Lloret de Mar.

The first seven qualified teams after the end of the first half of the season and Lloret Vila Esportiva as home team will play the Cup. Barcelona Lassa defended successfully its title, by defeating 2–1 Liceo in the final.

=== Qualified teams ===
Pos	Team	Pld	W	D	L	GF	GA	GD	Pts	Seed
1	Liceo	15	13	0	2	70	25	+45	39	Seeded team
2	Barcelona Lassa	15	12	2	1	52	16	+36	38	Seeded team
3	Reus Deportiu	15	11	0	4	63	43	+20	33	Seeded team
4	Noia Freixenet	15	8	5	2	44	32	+12	29	Seeded team
5	Igualada	15	8	2	5	43	32	+11	26	Non-seeded team
6	ICG Software Lleida	15	7	3	5	51	47	+4	24	Non-seeded team
7	Citylift Girona	15	7	3	5	41	32	+9	24	Non-seeded team
13	Lloret Vila Esportiva (H)	15	4	1	10	25	40	−15	13	Non-seeded team

(H) Hosts

=== Bracket ===
Quarterfinals
23 February
Barcelona Lassa	5
Citylift Girona	1
23 February
Reus Deportiu	7
ICG Software Lleida	6
22 February
Liceo	3
Lloret Vila Esportiva	0
22 February
Noia Freixenet	0
Igualada Rigat	3

Semifinals
24 February
Barcelona Lassa	3
Reus Deportiu	1
24 February
Liceo	2
Igualada Rigat	1

Final
25 February
Barcelona Lassa	2
Liceo	1

Source: FEP.es

== Supercopa de España ==
2017 Supercopa de España
Tournament details
- Arena: Poliesportiu Victorià Oliveras de la Riva, Sant Hipòlit de Voltregà
- Dates: 29–30 September 2017

Final positions
- Champions: Barcelona Lassa (10th title)
- Runners-up: Voltregà

Awards and statistics
- Top scorer(s): Pau Bargalló (Barcelona Lassa) (3 goals)

The 2017 Supercopa de España was the 14th edition of the Spanish men's roller hockey supercup.

It was played in a Final Four format between Voltregà, who qualified as host team, Barcelona Lassa as league and cup champion, and Reus Deportiu and Liceo as second and third qualified of the previous season.

Barcelona Lassa achieved their tenth title in a tournament where Liceo was the defending champion.

Semifinals
29 September
Barcelona Lassa	5
Reus Deportiu	2
29 September
Liceo	2 (1)
Voltregà	2 (2)

Final
30 September
Barcelona Lassa	4
Voltregà	0

== See also ==
- 2017–18 OK Liga Femenina
