= 2013 Eurockey Cup U-15 =

2013 2013 Eurockey Cup U-15
Tournament details
- Host country: Spain
- Dates: 31 October – 3 November
- Teams: 16 (from 1 confederation)
- Venue(s): (in Vilanova i la Geltrú host cities)

Final positions
- Champions: (Spain) Reus Deportiu (1st title)
- Runners-up: (Portugal) Sporting CP
- Third place: (Italy) Hockey Breganze
- Fourth place: (Spain) CH Caldes

Tournament statistics
- Matches played: 27
- Goals scored: 265 (9.81 per match)

The 2013 Eurockey Cup U-15 was the 2nd edition of the Eurockey Cup U-15. It was held in November 2013 in Vilanova i la Geltrú, in Spain.

== Teams ==
(Spain) AA Dominicos (Spanish Champion)	Reus Deportiu (Spain Runner-up)	CH Caldes (Spain 3rd class)	CP Alcobendas (Spain 4th class)	(Spain) CP Vilanova (host)
(Italy) UVP Mirandola e Modena (European Champion)	(Italy) Hockey Breganze (Italian Champion)	(Italy) H. Prato 54 (Italia runner-up)	(Italy) Montecchio Precalcino (Italia 3rd class)	
(Portugal) Sporting CP (Portuguese Champion)	(Portugal) C.D. Paço d'Arcos (Portuguese Champion Runner-up)	(Portugal) HC Braga (Portuguese 3rd class)		
(France) US Villejuif (French Champion)	RHC Lyon (France runner-up)			
(Switzerland) RSC Uttigen (Swiss Champion)				
RHC Dornbirn (Austria Champion)

== Group stage ==
=== Group A ===
Team	Pts	Pld	W	D	L	GF	GA	GD
(Spain) CP Alcobendas	6	3	2	0	1	11	9	+2
(Italy) UVP Mirandola e Modena	4	3	1	1	1	6	5	−1
(Portugal) HC Braga	4	3	1	1	1	12	9	+3
(France) US Villejuif	3	3	1	0	2	6	12	−6

	MIR	BRA	VIL	ALC
UVP Mirandola e Modena (Italy)		2–2*	2–0	2–3
HC Braga (Portugal)	–		7–2	3–5
US Villejuif (France)	–	–		4–3
CP Alcobendas (Spain)	–	–	–	

* – UVP Mirandola e Modena wins the Free-kick tie-up

=== Group B ===
Team	Pts	Pld	W	D	L	GF	GA	GD
(Portugal) Sporting CP	9	3	3	0	0	18	7	+11
(Italy) Hockey Breganze	6	3	2	0	1	24	5	+19
(Spain) AA Dominicos	3	3	1	0	2	13	19	−6
(Switzerland) RSC Uttigen	0	3	0	0	3	8	32	−24

	BRE	SPO	UTT	DOM
Hockey Breganze (Italy)		1–3	16–1	7–1
Sporting CP (Portugal)	–		7–3	8–3
RSC Uttigen (Switzerland)	–	–		4–9
AA Dominicos (Spain)	–	–	–	

=== Group C ===
Team	Pts	Pld	W	D	L	GF	GA	GD
(Spain) Reus Deportiu	7	3	2	1	0	10	2	+8
(Portugal) C.D. Paço d'Arcos	6	3	2	0	1	15	6	+9
(Italy) H. Prato 54	2	3	0	2	1	3	7	−4
(France) RHC Lyon	1	3	0	1	2	3	16	−13

	PRA	PAÇ	LYO	REU
H. Prato 54 (Italy)		0–4	2–2	1–1
C.D. Paço d'Arcos (Portugal)	–		10–1	1–5
RHC Lyon (France)	–	–		0–4
Reus Deportiu (Spain)	–	–	–	

=== Group D ===
Team	Pts	Pld	W	D	L	GF	GA	GD
(Spain) CH Caldes	9	3	3	0	0	20	0	+20
(Spain) CP Vilanova	6	3	2	0	1	8	9	−1
(Italy) Montecchio Precalcino	3	3	1	0	2	4	12	−8
(Austria) RHC Dornbirn	0	3	0	0	3	4	15	−11

	MON	DOR	VIL	CAL
Montecchio Precalcino (Italy)		3–2	1–4	0–6
RHC Dornbirn (Austria)	–		2–4	0–8
CP Vilanova (Spain)	–	–		0–6
CH Caldes (Spain)	–	–	–	

== Final stage ==
=== Championship ===
Quarter-finals
2 Nov 08:00
(Spain) CP Alcobendas	1
(Italy) Hockey Breganze	4
2 Nov 09:10
(Spain) Reus Deportiu	4
(Spain) CP Vilanova	0
2 Nov 10:20
(Portugal) Sporting CP	3
(Italy) UVP Mirandola e Modena	1
2 Nov 11:30
(Spain) CH Caldes	4
(Portugal) C.D. Paço d'Arcos	2

Semi-finals
2 Nov 17:30
(Italy) Hockey Breganze	2
(Spain) Reus Deportiu	3
2 Nov 18:45
(Portugal) Sporting CP	6
(Spain) CH Caldes	3

Final
3 Nov 11:00
(Spain) Reus Deportiu	3
(Portugal) Sporting CP	2
Third place
3 Nov 09:30
(Italy) Hockey Breganze	2
(Spain) CH Caldes	0

=== 9th – 16th place ===
Qualifier 1
2 Nov 08:00
(Portugal) HC Braga	9
(Switzerland) RSC Uttigen	8
2 Nov 09:10
(Italy) H. Prato 54	3
(Austria) RHC Dornbirn	0
2 Nov 10:20
(Spain) AA Dominicos	3
(France) US Villejuif	4
2 Nov 11:30
(Italy) Montecchio Precalcino	6
(France) RHC Lyon	4

qualifier 2
2 Nov 15:00
(Portugal) HC Braga	4
(Italy) H. Prato 54	3
2 Nov 16:15
(France) US Villejuif	4
(Italy) Montecchio Precalcino	3

9th place
3 Nov 08:15
(Portugal) HC Braga	6
(France) US Villejuif	3

== Final standing ==
Rank	Team
Gold medal	(Spain) Reus Deportiu
Silver medal	(Portugal) Sporting CP
Bronze medal	(Italy) Hockey Breganze
4	(Spain) CH Caldes
5	(Spain) CP Alcobendas
5	(Spain) CP Vilanova
5	(Italy) UVP Mirandola e Modena
5	(Portugal) C.D. Paço d'Arcos
9	(Portugal) HC Braga
10	(France) US Villejuif
11	(Italy) Hockey Prato 54
11	(Italy) Montecchio Precalcino
13	(Switzerland) RSC Uttigen
13	(Austria) RHC Dornbirn
13	(Spain) AA Dominicos
13	(France) RHC Lyon

2013 European Champions
Reus Deportiu
1st
