= RCD Espanyol Hoquei =

RCD Espanyol
- League: Segona Catalana
- Founded: 1942
- Dissolved: 1972

Personnel
- Manager: Bernat Bosch
Home

Reial Club Deportiu Espanyol Hoquei was a Spanish roller hockey club from Barcelona, Catalonia. Established in 1942 and folded in 1972.

== History ==
Founded in 1942, until its dissolution in 1972, Espanyol was one of the main teams in the Catalan and Spanish roller hockey.

Before the creation of the Spanish League, the club was the great dominator of the Catalan League, with 15 titles won and also eleven National Cups.

=== Refoundation ===
In March 2017, the Association of Supporters and Shareholders of RCD Espanyol boosted a project for recovering the sporting sections of the club, but this time without any economic link with the football team. The new multi-sports club was created with the name of Seccions Deportives Espanyol (Sporting sections Espanyol).

Two months later, the Association confirmed that Espanyol will start competing in the 2017–18 fifth tier, but it would be possible to start playing in the Spanish second division.

== Trophies ==
- Copa del Rey: 11
  - 1944, 1947, 1948, 1949, 1951, 1954, 1955, 1956, 1957, 1961, 1962
- Nations Cup: 1
  - 1953
