= Supercopa de España de Hockey Patines =

Annual Spanish rink hockey tournament

Supercopa de Hockey Patines
- Sport: Roller hockey
- Founded: 2004
- No. of teams: 4
- Country: Spain
- Most recent champions: FC Barcelona (16th title)
- Most titles: FC Barcelona (16 titles)
- Broadcaster: Esport3
- Website: www.fep.es

The Supercopa de España de Hockey Patines is an annual Spanish rink hockey tournament played by the winners and runners-up of both OK Liga and Copa del Rey. It's managed by Federación Española de Patinaje.

Until 2012, if a team won both OK Liga and Copa del Rey, its Supercopa opponent was the Copa del Rey runners-up.

Since that year, the tournament changed to a Final Four format.

== Winners by year ==
Year	Venue	Champion	Runners-up	Score
1984*	–	Reus Deportiu	–	–
1985–93	DNP			
1994*	As Pontes	ONCE Igualada	Liceo Caixa Galicia	6–3
1995–03	DNP			
2004	Two-legs	Barcelona Excelent	Liceo Vodafone	7–3/2–2
2005	Two-legs	Barcelona Sorli Discau	Roncato Vic	4–2/6–3
2006	Two-legs	Alnimar Reus	Barcelona Sorli Discau	3–2/3–3
2007	Two-legs	Barcelona Sorli Discau	Alnimar Reus	4–2/1–2
2008	Two-legs	Barcelona Sorli Discau	Noia Freixenet	5–1/4–3
2009	Two-legs	Roncato Vic	Barcelona Sorli Discau	4–1/3–4
2010	Two-legs	Roncato Vic	Barcelona Sorli Discau	2–5/4–0
2011	Sant Sadurní d'Anoia	Barcelona	Tecnol Reus	5–1
2012	Two-legs	Barcelona	Noia Freixenet	3–1/6–1
2013	El Vendrell	Barcelona	Reus Deportiu	3–3 (1–0 p)
2014	Reus	Barcelona	Liceo	5–4
2015	Vic	Barcelona Lassa	Liceo	6–5
2016	Reus	Liceo	Reus Deportiu La Fira	2–1
2017	Sant Hipòlit de Voltregà	Barcelona Lassa	Voltregà	4–0
2018	Sant Sadurní d'Anoia	Liceo	Barcelona Lassa	3–2
2019	Igualada	Reus Deportiu	Barcelona	3–2
2020	Lloret de Mar	Barcelona	Reus Deportiu	4–1
2021	Sant Sadurní d'Anoia	Deportivo Liceo	Barcelona	3–2
2022	Olot	Barcelona	Reus Deportiu	4–0
2023	Reus	Barcelona	Deportivo Liceo	3–2
2024	A Coruña	Barcelona	Reus Deportiu	1–0
2025	Igualada	Barcelona	Igualada	3–1
2026	Olot	Barcelona	Igualada	2–2 (3–2 p)

- Unofficial trophy.

== Wins by club ==
Team	Titles	Runners-up	Champion Years
Barcelona	16	6	2004, 2005, 2007, 2008, 2011, 2012, 2013, 2014, 2015, 2017, 2020, 2022, 2023, 2024, 2025, 2026
Liceo	3	4	2016, 2018, 2021
Reus Deportiu	2	7	2006, 2019
Vic	2	1	2009, 2010
Noia	0	2	
Igualada	0	2	
Voltregà	0	1	

== See also ==
- OK Liga
- Copa del Rey de Hockey Patines
