= 2018–19 World Skate Europe Cup =

2018–19 WS Europe Cup
Tournament details
- Teams: 28 (from 7 associations)

Final positions
- Champions: (Spain) Lleida Llista Blava (2nd title)
- Runners-up: (Italy) Sarzana

Tournament statistics
- Matches played: 47
- Goals scored: 403 (8.57 per match)
- Top scorer(s): (Italy) Massimo Tataranni (15 goals)

The 2018–19 World Skate Europe Cup was the 39th season of the World Skate Europe Cup, the first one with the new name of the formerly known as CERS Cup, Europe's second club roller hockey competition organized by World Skate Europe. Lleida Llista Blava won its second title in a row.

== Teams ==
28 teams from seven national associations qualified for the competition. League positions of the previous season shown in parentheses.

Participating teams
(France) Mérignac (3rd)	(Germany) Darmstadt (4th)	(Spain) Caldes (9th)	(Switzerland) Uttigen (4th)
(France) Noisy le Grand (4th)	(Germany) Iserlohn (5th)	(Portugal) Barcelos (6th)	(Switzerland) Uri (5th)
(France) Nantes (5th)	(Germany) Walsum (6th)	(Portugal) Juventude Viana (7th)	(Italy) Viareggio (4th)
(France) Coutras (6th)	(Spain) Lleida Llista Blava ^{TH} (5th)	(Portugal) Sporting Tomar (8th)	(Italy) Valdagno (7th)
(France) La Vendéenne (7th)	(Spain) Igualada (6th)	(Portugal) Turquel (9th)	(Italy) Sarzana (9th)
(Germany) Düsseldorf-Nord (2nd)	(Spain) Girona (7th)	(Switzerland) Biasca (2nd)	(Austria) Dornbirn (1st)
(Germany) Remscheid (3rd)	(Spain) Voltregà (8th)	(Switzerland) Diessbach (3rd)	(Austria) Wolfurt (2nd)

== Bracket ==
The draw was held at World Skate Europe headquarters in Lisbon, Portugal.

Round of 32
(Italy) Sarzana	8	3	11
(France) Noisy le Grand	2	3	5
(Portugal) Sporting Tomar	4	4	8
(Spain) Caldes	2	4	6
(Spain) Igualada	7	13	20
(Switzerland) Uri	1	1	2
(Switzerland) Diessbach	6	5	11
(France) La Vendéenne	6	1	7
(Germany) Walsum	4	4	8
(Portugal) Turquel	4	5	9
(Germany) Iserlohn	4	3	7
(Switzerland) Biasca	5	7	12
(Italy) Valdagno	11	7	18
(Germany) Düsseldorf-Nord	2	2	4
(Portugal) Barcelos	5	0	5
(France) Nantes	4	10	14
(France) Coutras	4	4	8
(Germany) Remscheid	3	3	6
(Germany) Darmstadt	1	1	2
(Spain) Girona	6	7	13
(Austria) Wolfurt	5	10	15
(Switzerland) Uttigen	4	4	8
(Austria) Dornbirn	2	0	2
(Portugal) Juventude Viana	5	10	15

Round of 16
(Italy) Sarzana	6	3	9
(Portugal) Sporting Tomar	4	4	8
(Spain) Igualada	4	4	8
(Switzerland) Diessbach	1	3	4
(Portugal) Turquel	2	4	6
(Italy) Viareggio	5	4	9
(Switzerland) Biasca	5	6	11
(Italy) Valdagno	6	9	15
(France) Nantes	4	6	10
(France) Coutras	2	7	9
(Spain) Girona	1	5	6
(Spain) Lleida Llista Blava	6	6	12
(Austria) Wolfurt	10	2	12
(France) Mérignac	0	4	4
(Portugal) Juventude Viana	2	2	4
(Spain) Voltregà	2	4	6

Quarterfinals
(Italy) Sarzana	5	3	8
(Spain) Igualada	4	3	7
(Italy) Viareggio	5	3	8
(Italy) Valdagno	5	4	9
(France) Nantes	3	3	6
(Spain) Lleida Llista Blava	5	8	13
(Austria) Wolfurt	1	3	4
(Spain) Voltregà	8	7	15

Semifinals
(Italy) Sarzana (a.e.t.)	4
(Italy) Valdagno	2
(Spain) Lleida Llista Blava	5
(Spain) Voltregà	2

Final
(Italy) Sarzana	3
(Spain) Lleida Llista Blava	6

== Round of 32 ==
The first leg was played on 20 October and the second leg on 17 November 2018.

Team 1	Agg.	Team 2	1st leg	2nd leg
Dornbirn (Austria)	2–15	(Portugal) Juventude Viana	2–5	0–10 (Note: Dornbirn lost by forfeit due to lack of delegate in the bench.)
Walsum (Germany)	8–9	(Portugal) Turquel	4–4	4–5
Igualada (Spain)	20–2	(Switzerland) Uri	7–1	13–1
Barcelos (Portugal)	5–14	(France) Nantes	5–4	0–10 (Note: Barcelos lost by forfeit due to lack of coach in the bench.)
Sarzana (Italy)	11–5	(France) Noisy le Grand	8–2	3–3
Diessbach (Germany)	11–7	(France) La Vendéenne	6–6	5–1
Valdagno (Italy)	18–4	(Germany) Düsseldorf-Nord	11–2	7–2
Darmstadt (Germany)	2–13	(Spain) Girona	1–6	1–7
Wolfurt (Austria)	15–8	(Switzerland) Uttigen	5–4	10–4
Iserlohn (Germany)	7–12	(Switzerland) Biasca	4–5	3–7
Sporting Tomar (Portugal)	8–6	(Spain) Caldes	4–2	4–4
Coutras (France)	8–6	(Germany) Remscheid	4–3	4–3 (a.e.t.)

== Round of 16 ==
The first leg was played on 1 December 2018 and the second leg on 19 January 2019.

Team 1	Agg.	Team 2	1st leg	2nd leg
Wolfurt (Austria)	10–0	(France) Mérignac	10–0 (Note: Mérignac lost by forfeit due to lack of coach in the bench.)	w/o
Juventude Viana (Portugal)	4–6	(Spain) Voltregà	2–2	2–4
Biasca (Switzerland)	11–15	(Italy) Valdagno	5–6	6–9
Girona (Spain)	6–12	(Spain) Lleida Llista Blava	1–6	5–6
Nantes (France)	9–9 (p)	(France) Coutras	4–2	5–7 (a.e.t.)
Sarzana (Italy)	9–7	(Portugal) Sporting Tomar	6–2	3–5
Turquel (Portugal)	6–9	(Italy) Viareggio	2–5	4–4
Igualada (Spain)	8–4	(Germany) Diessbach	4–1	4–3

== Quarterfinals ==
The first leg was played on 16 February and the second leg on 9 March 2019 (with exception Valdagno-Viareggio on 16 March).

Team 1	Agg.	Team 2	1st leg	2nd leg
Nantes (France)	6–13	(Spain) Lleida Llista Blava	3–5	3–8
Sarzana (Italy)	8–7	(Spain) Igualada	5–4	3–3 (a.e.t.)
Wolfurt (Austria)	4–15	(Spain) Voltregà	1–8	3–7
Viareggio (Italy)	8–9	(Italy) Valdagno	5–5	3–4

== Final Four ==
The Final Four was played on 27 and 28 April in Lleida, Spain.

Semifinals
(Italy) Sarzana (a.e.t.)	4
(Italy) Valdagno	2
(Spain) Lleida Llista Blava	5
(Spain) Voltregà	2

Final
(Italy) Sarzana	3
(Spain) Lleida Llista Blava	6

== See also ==
- 2018–19 CERH European League
- 2018 Rink Hockey Continental Cup
- 2019 Rink Hockey Continental Cup
- 2018–19 CERH Women's European Cup
