= 2018–19 OK Liga =

OK Liga
- Season: 2018–19
- Dates: 22 September 2018 – 1 June 2019
- Biggest home win: Barcelona 12–0 Alcobendas (12 January 2019)
- Biggest away win: Calafell 1–6 Barcelona (28 October 2018)
- Highest scoring: Barcelona 9–3 Sant Cugat (23 October 2018)

The 2018–19 OK Liga is the 50th season of the top-tier league of rink hockey in Spain. It started on 22 September 2018 and end on 1 June 2019.

== Teams ==
Non-Catalan teams 2018–19 teams
Catalan teams in OK Liga 2018–19 season

Team	Arena	City/Area
Alcobendas	Amaya Valdemoro	Alcobendas
Barcelona Lassa	Palau Blaugrana	Barcelona
Calafell Tot l'Any	Joan Ortoll	Calafell
Citylift Girona	Palau II	Girona
Deportivo Liceo	Riazor	A Coruña
Igualada	Les Comes	Igualada
Lleida Llista Blava	Onze de Setembre	Lleida
Lloret Vila Esportiva	Pavelló Municipal	Lloret de Mar
Noia Freixenet	Pavelló Olímpic	Sant Sadurní d'Anoia
PAS Alcoy	Francisco Laporta	Alcoy
Recam Làser Caldes	Torre Roja	Caldes de Montbui
Reus Deportiu Miró	Pavelló del Reus Deportiu	Reus
Sant Cugat	Pavelló Municipal	Sant Cugat del Vallès
Vendrell	Pavelló Municipal	El Vendrell
Vic	Pavelló Olímpic	Vic
Voltregà Stern Motor	Victorià Oliveras de la Riva	Sant Hipòlit de Voltregà

== League table ==
Pos	Team	Pld	W	D	L	GF	GA	GD	Pts	Qualification or relegation
1	Barcelona Lassa	30	27	3	0	161	48	+113	84	Qualification to European League
2	Deportivo Liceo	30	21	3	6	136	73	+63	66	Qualification to European League
3	Reus Deportiu Miró	30	18	9	3	121	71	+50	63	Qualification to European League
4	Noia Freixenet	30	19	4	7	110	76	+34	61	Qualification to European League
5	Igualada Rigat	30	16	3	11	99	76	+23	51 (Note: Igualada Rigat is ahead of Lleida Llista Blava on head-to-head points: Lleida Llista Blava–Igualada Rigat 1–5, Igualada Rigat–Lleida Llista Blava 5–1)	Qualification to CERS Cup
6	Lleida Llista Blava	30	15	6	9	109	91	+18	51	Qualification to CERS Cup
7	Recam Làser Caldes	30	11	6	13	78	99	−21	39	Qualification to CERS Cup
8	Voltregà Stern Motor	30	10	4	16	70	87	−17	34	Qualification to CERS Cup
9	Citylift Girona	30	9	6	15	76	97	−21	33 (Note: Citylift Girona is ahead of Calafell Tot l'Any on head-to-head goal difference: Calafell Tot l'Any–Citylift Girona 6–5, Citylift Girona–Calafell Tot l'Any 5–1)	Qualification to CERS Cup
10	Calafell Tot l'Any	30	9	6	15	76	113	−37	33	
11	Vic	30	8	8	14	61	79	−18	32 (Note: Vic is ahead of Lloret Vila Esportiva on head-to-head points: Vic–Lloret Vila Esportiva 3–3, Lloret Vila Esportiva–Vic 2–4)	
12	Lloret Vila Esportiva	30	8	8	14	75	110	−35	32	
13	Alcobendas	30	8	5	17	91	129	−38	29 (Note: Alcobendas is ahead of Vendrell on head-to-head points: Vendrell–Alcobendas 4–4, Alcobendas–Vendrell 3–1)	Relegation to OK Liga Plata
14	Vendrell	30	7	8	15	70	96	−26	29	Relegation to OK Liga Plata
15	Sant Cugat	30	5	8	17	80	107	−27	23	Relegation to OK Liga Plata
16	PAS Alcoy	30	4	3	23	65	126	−61	15	Relegation to OK Liga Plata

Source: FEP.es

== Results ==
Home \ Away	ACB	BAR	CLF	GIR	LIC	IGU	LLE	LLO	NOI	ALC	CAL	REU	SCU	VEN	VIC	VOL
Alcobendas	—	2–5	3–3	7–2	2–3	1–5	4–0	3–3	2–3	3–2	5–3	4–5	3–2	3–1	3–2	3–3
Barcelona Lassa	12–0	—	7–0	3–0	6–2	7–2	3–3	11–2	2–1	11–4	5–0	2–0	9–3	4–0	5–0	5–2
Calafell Tot l'Any	6–4	1–6	—	6–5	1–3	4–3	2–5	4–3	3–2	8–4	1–5	0–6	3–3	4–4	1–3	1–0
Citylift Girona	6–3	2–3	5–1	—	2–4	2–2	2–2	3–3	6–2	4–1	1–1	5–5	3–2	2–2	1–4	1–4
Deportivo Liceo	8–3	4–5	4–1	6–1	—	7–2	3–3	10–0	6–1	8–1	4–0	4–4	3–1	8–2	1–2	8–4
Igualada	10–1	1–5	7–3	3–1	0–2	—	5–1	4–2	2–1	2–0	3–2	3–5	4–4	2–3	5–0	3–1
Lleida Llista Blava	8–6	4–9	2–0	6–5	5–4	1–5	—	1–3	2–4	6–2	6–2	3–3	7–3	5–2	4–0	6–2
Lloret Vila Esportiva	4–2	1–3	3–5	2–3	1–7	3–1	0–4	—	4–1	5–4	0–0	3–3	5–4	4–4	2–4	1–1
Noia Freixenet	7–2	2–2	6–2	7–2	7–1	6–4	3–3	7–2	—	5–1	5–4	2–1	4–3	3–1	5–1	5–3
PAS Alcoy	5–3	1–6	4–4	1–2	3–4	1–4	1–5	2–2	1–2	—	3–5	2–7	3–1	3–2	1–5	0–2
Recam Làser Caldes	3–2	0–4	2–2	3–1	3–6	2–1	5–4	3–2	2–3	4–3	—	0–7	5–3	1–4	2–2	2–4
Reus Deportiu Miró	5–2	4–4	2–2	1–0	5–1	5–3	4–4	7–1	5–5	5–1	5–2	—	10–5	3–2	3–3	2–1
Sant Cugat	3–3	3–7	2–1	6–2	3–3	3–5	3–1	4–1	2–3	2–4	3–3	2–3	—	0–2	2–1	2–2
Vendrell	4–4	1–5	4–2	3–1	2–5	2–2	3–1	1–5	3–5	5–4	1–3	1–2	2–2	—	2–2	5–6
Vic	2–5	1–2	6–4	2–3	1–2	0–3	1–2	3–3	2–2	1–0	5–5	2–3	3–3	1–1	—	0–3
Voltregà Stern Motor	4–3	2–3	0–1	2–3	2–5	1–3	2–5	1–5	2–1	3–3	4–6	2–1	2–1	4–1	1–2	—

Source: FEP.es
Legend: Blue = home team win; Yellow = draw; Red = away team win.

== Copa del Rey ==
2019 Copa del Rey
Tournament details
- Arena: 21–24 February 2019
- Dates: Olympic Pavilion, Reus

Final positions
- Champions: Barcelona Lassa (23rd title)
- Runners-up: Deportivo Liceo

Awards and statistics
- MVP: (Portugal) João Rodrigues

The 2019 Copa del Rey was the 76th edition of the Spanish men's roller hockey cup.

Barcelona Lassa defended successfully the title.

=== Draw ===
The draw was held at the Olympic Pavilion of Reus on 7 February 2019.

=== Bracket ===
Quarterfinals
21 February
Deportivo Liceo	5
Igualada Rigat	1
21 February
Reus Deportiu	1
Lleida Llista Blava	2
22 February
Recam Làser Caldes	3
Voltregà Stern Motor	1
22 February
Barcelona Lassa	4
Noia Freixenet	2

Semifinals
23 February
Deportivo Liceo	3
Lleida Llista Blava	1
23 February
Recam Làser Caldes	1
Barcelona Lassa	2

Final
24 February
Deportivo Liceo	1
Barcelona Lassa	4

Source: FEP.es

== Supercopa de España ==
2018 Supercopa de España
Tournament details
- Arena: Olímpic de l'Ateneu, Sant Sadurní d'Anoia
- Dates: 15–16 September 2018

Final positions
- Champions: Liceo (2nd title)
- Runners-up: Barcelona Lassa

Awards and statistics
- Top scorer(s): Pau Bargalló; Carlo di Benedetto; Edu Lamas (2 goals each)

The 2018 Supercopa de España was the 15th edition of the Spanish men's roller hockey supercup, played on 15 and 16 September 2018 in Sant Sadurní d'Anoia.

It was played in a Final Four format between Noia Freixenet, who qualified as host team, Barcelona Lassa as league and cup champion, and Liceo and Reus Deportiu as second and third qualified of the previous season.

Barcelona Lassa, defending champion, lost the title in the last 10 seconds of the final against Liceo, that achieved their second Supercup ever.

Semifinals
15 September
Reus Deportiu	2
Liceo	3
15 September
Barcelona Lassa	3
Noia Freixenet	2

Final
16 September
Liceo	3
Barcelona Lassa	2

== Lower divisions ==
=== OK Liga Plata ===
The OK Liga Plata, until the previous season known as Primera División, is the second division of Spanish men's roller hockey.

Pos	Team	Pld	W	D	L	GF	GA	GD	Pts	Promotion or relegation
1	Corredor Mató Palafrugell	26	14	5	7	104	74	+30	47 (Note: Corredor Mató Palafrugell is ahead of Taradell on overall goal difference)	Promotion to OK Liga
2	Taradell	26	13	8	5	88	61	+27	47	Promotion to OK Liga
3	Lleidanet Alpicat	26	14	4	8	133	105	+28	46 (Note: Lleidanet Alpicat is ahead of Mataró on head-to-head points: Lleidanet Alpicat–Mataró 6–6, Mataró–Lleidanet Alpicat 2–4)	
4	Mataró	26	13	7	6	98	76	+22	46	
5	Manlleu	26	13	3	10	93	88	+5	42	
6	Vilanova	26	11	5	10	79	97	−18	38 (Note: Vilanova is ahead of SHUM Frit Ravich on head-to-head points: SHUM Frit Ravich–Vilanova 3–4, Vilanova–SHUM Frit Ravich 4–3)	
7	SHUM Frit Ravich	26	11	5	10	98	92	+6	38	
8	Cafés Novell Vilafranca	26	10	4	12	81	74	+7	34	
9	Tordera	26	10	3	13	80	104	−24	33	
10	Barcelona Lassa B	26	8	8	10	76	79	−3	32 (Note: Barcelona Lassa B is ahead of Deportivo Liceo B and Arenys de Munt on head-to-head points: Barcelona Lassa B 6 pts, Deportivo Liceo B 5 pts, Arenys de Munt 3 pts)	
11	Deportivo Liceo B	26	9	5	12	100	104	−4	32	
12	Arenys de Munt	26	7	11	8	79	70	+9	32	
13	Sant Feliu	26	3	10	13	77	96	−19	19 (Note: Sant Feliu is ahead of Raspeig on overall goal difference)	
14	Raspeig	26	5	4	17	69	135	−66	19	Relegation to OK Liga Bronce

Source: FEP.es

=== OK Liga Bronce ===
The OK Liga Bronce is the new third tier, played with the best teams in the Regional leagues. For this first season, only the winners of the Catalan playoffs and four teams from the groups North and South each will be promoted to OK Liga Plata.

The two non-Catalan groups were composed by:

- Group North: 3 teams from Galicia, 3 teams from Asturias and 2 teams from the Northern league
- Group South: 4 teams from Madrid and 4 teams from the Southern league. However, the fourth team from the latest renounced to the OK Liga Bronce.

Group North
Pos	Team	Pld	Pts
1	Jolaseta	14	40
2	Dominicos	14	27
3	Compañía de María	14	26
4	Oviedo Booling	14	26
5	Asturhockey	14	14
6	Areces	14	14
7	Iruña	14	11
8	Calvo Escola Lubiáns	14	1

Source: FEP.es

Group South
Pos	Team	Pld	Pts
1	Las Rozas	12	26
2	Rivas H2O	12	25
3	Santa María del Pilar	12	24
4	Burguillos del Cerro	12	19
5	Alcorcón	12	14
6	Cájar Granada	12	10
7	Cocentaina	12	4

Source: FEP.es

Catalan playoffs

Round of 16
Capellades	2	4	6
Cerdanyola	3	2	5
Ripollet Serveis Inmobiliaris	2	3	5
Olot	2	5	7
Manlleu B	2	4	6
Recam Làser Caldes B	4	1	5
Vila-seca	4	1	5
GEiEG	2	4	6

Quarter-finals
Sentmenat	5	6
Capellades	4	1
Sant Just	4	4	5
Olot	6	1	3
Noia Freixenet B	1	3
Manlleu B	3	6
Piera	6	4	4
GEiEG	3	5	3

Semi-finals
Sentmenat	3	3
Sant Just	5	4
Manlleu B	7	3
Piera	10	6

Final
Sant Just	5	2	4
Piera	2	5	2

Source: OKCat.cat

== See also ==
- 2018–19 OK Liga Femenina
