= 2019–20 OK Liga =

OK Liga
- Season: 2019–20
- Dates: 20 September 2019 – 9 June 2020
- Champions: Barcelona

The 2019–20 OK Liga was the 51st season of the top-tier league of rink hockey in Spain. As the season was unfinished, Barcelona were declared champions.

== Format changes ==
The competition recovered the playoffs for the title and relegation. The first ten qualified teams would fight for the title after the regular season, while the last four teams would try to avoid relegation. Two teams would be relegated to OK Liga Plata.

However, the season was suspended due to the COVID-19 pandemic after remaining one round for ending the regular season.

== Teams ==
Non-Catalan teams 2019–20 teams
Catalan teams in OK Liga 2019–20 season

Team	Arena	City/area
Barcelona	Palau Blaugrana	Barcelona
Calafell Tot l'Any	Joan Ortoll	Calafell
Caldes Recam Làser	Torre Roja	Caldes de Montbui
Corredor Mató Palafrugell	Pavelló Municipal	Palafrugell
Deportivo Liceo	Riazor	A Coruña
Garatge Plana Girona	Palau II	Girona
Igualada Rigat	Les Comes	Igualada
Lleida Llista Blava	Onze de Setembre	Lleida
Lloret Vila Esportiva	Pavelló Municipal	Lloret de Mar
Noia Freixenet	Pavelló Olímpic	Sant Sadurní d'Anoia
Reus Deportiu Miró	Pavelló del Reus Deportiu	Reus
Stern Motor Voltregà	Victorià Oliveras de la Riva	Sant Hipòlit de Voltregà
Taradell	El Pujoló	Taradell
Vic	Pavelló Olímpic	Vic

== Regular season ==
=== League table ===
Pos	Team	Pld	W	D	L	GF	GA	GD	Pts	Relegation
1	Barcelona	25	24	0	1	158	43	+115	72	Qualification to the European League
2	Deportivo Liceo	25	20	1	4	126	51	+75	61	Qualification to the European League
3	Noia Freixenet	25	15	4	6	89	60	+29	49	Qualification to the European League
4	Reus Deportiu Miró	25	14	5	6	84	72	+12	47	Qualification to the European League
5	Garatge Plana Girona	25	11	8	6	54	64	−10	41	Qualification to the WS Europe Cup
6	Caldes Recam Làser	25	11	7	7	87	77	+10	40	Qualification to the WS Europe Cup
7	Igualada Rigat	25	13	1	11	92	92	0	40	Qualification to the WS Europe Cup
8	Calafell Tot l'Any	25	10	6	9	68	61	+7	36	Qualification to the WS Europe Cup
9	Lleida Llista Blava	25	7	4	14	61	88	−27	25	Qualification to the WS Europe Cup
10	Stern Motor Voltregà	25	5	6	14	45	68	−23	21	
11	Corredor Mató Palafrugell	25	6	3	16	51	104	−53	21	
12	Taradell	25	4	4	17	47	100	−53	16	
13	Lloret Vila Esportiva	25	4	3	18	46	89	−43	15	
14	Vic	25	3	4	18	49	88	−39	13	

Source: FEP.es

=== Results ===
Home \ Away	BAR	CLF	CAL	PAL	LIC	GIR	IGU	LLE	LLO	NOI	REU	VOL	TAR	VIC
Barcelona	—	6–3	8–1	14–1	9–3	8–2	8–4	9–2	7–2	5–1	7–1	3–2	5–0	8–0
Calafell Tot l'Any	2–3	—	2–2	3–2	1–2	1–1	4–3	4–2	6–1	6–4	4–3	3–0	4–4	5–1
Caldes Recam Làser	2–9	4–2	—	3–1	4–3	2–2	5–3	2–2	6–2	3–3	4–5	5–3	7–1	6–2
Corredor Mató Palafrugell	2–6	1–3	3–3	—	2–9	3–3	3–7	2–1	3–1	2–3	4–6	2–3	3–1	2–1
Deportivo Liceo	2–1	4–0	5–2	13–0	—	10–1	9–0	2–1	10–1	3–4		5–1	8–2	7–3
Garatge Plana Girona	0–4	2–2		3–2	1–1	—	3–7	2–1	1–0	3–2	5–1	3–0	4–2	2–1
Igualada Rigat	3–5	4–3	3–7		3–5	1–0	—	3–2	0–3	1–5	3–3	4–2	2–0	3–2
Lleida Llista Blava	0–6		1–5	1–0	3–4	4–4	6–8	—	4–1	2–5	0–5	4–2	3–2	4–2
Lloret Vila Esportiva		2–2	0–3	2–2	1–3	3–4	2–7	4–4	—	0–1	2–4	5–2	3–4	3–2
Noia Freixenet	2–4	2–1	5–2	5–1	2–5	1–1	4–3	7–2	4–0	—	4–4	5–1	6–1	5–2
Reus Deportiu Miró	2–6	3–4	5–3	8–4	1–4	3–0	3–2	2–1	4–2	4–4	—	1–1	4–1	3–0
Stern Motor Voltregà	2–5	1–0	2–2	3–0	1–2	1–1	2–6	1–1	1–3	3–2	2–3	—		1–1
Taradell	0–5	2–2	3–2	0–3	4–3	1–2	6–9	4–5	3–2	1–3	2–2	0–6	—	1–5
Vic	4–7	2–1	2–2	2–3	3–4	3–4	0–3	2–5	2–1		3–4	2–2	2–2	—

Source: FEP.es
Legend: Blue = home team win; Yellow = draw; Red = away team win.

== Copa del Rey ==
2019 Copa del Rey
Tournament details
- Arena: Riazor, A Coruña
- Dates: 19–22 March 2020

The 2020 Copa del Rey was the 78th edition of the Spanish men's roller hockey cup. The draw was held in A Coruña on 30 January 2020.

It was suspended due to the COVID-19 pandemic.

=== Bracket ===
Quarterfinals
19 March
Deportivo Liceo
Reus Deportiu Miró
19 March
Igualada Rigat
Calafell Tot l'Any
20 March
Barcelona
Garatge Plana Girona
20 March
Noia Freixenet
Recam Làser Caldes

Semifinals
21 March
21 March

Final
22 March

Source: FEP

== Supercopa de España ==
2019 Supercopa de España
Tournament details
- Arena: Les Comes, Igualada
- Dates: 14–15 September 2019
- Champions: Reus Deportiu Miró (2nd title)

The 2019 Supercopa de España was the 16th edition of the Spanish men's roller hockey supercup, played on 14 and 15 September 2019.

Liceo were the defending champions.

Semifinals
14 September
Reus Deportiu Miró	4
Deportivo Liceo	2
14 September
Igualada Rigat	1
Barcelona	3

Final
15 September
Reus Deportiu Miró	3
Barcelona	2

== Lower divisions ==
=== OK Liga Plata ===
The OK Liga Plata will be played by 24 teams.

==== Group North ====
Pos	Team	Pld	W	D	L	GF	GA	GD	Pts	Promotion, qualification or relegation
1	Mataró	16	10	0	6	68	39	+29	30	Promotion to OK Liga
2	Manlleu Embotits Solà	16	9	3	4	66	41	+25	30	Qualification to promotion playoffs
3	Digittecnic Vilafranca	16	8	5	3	54	36	+18	29	
4	Compañía de María	16	8	4	4	60	44	+16	28	
5	Arenys de Munt	16	8	3	5	49	34	+15	27	
6	Alpicat	16	8	2	6	59	57	+2	26	
7	Deportivo Liceo B	16	6	3	7	46	57	−11	21	
8	Dominicos	16	6	2	8	56	70	−14	20	
9	Tordera	16	6	1	9	51	63	−12	19	
10	Vilanova	16	5	2	9	45	64	−19	17	
11	Oviedo Booling	16	4	2	10	46	74	−28	14	Relegation to OK Liga Bronce
12	Jolaseta	16	4	1	11	38	59	−21	13	Relegation to OK Liga Bronce

Updated to match(es) played on 7 March 2020. Source: FEP.es

==== Group South ====
Pos	Team	Pld	W	D	L	GF	GA	GD	Pts	Promotion, qualification or relegation
1	Vendrell	16	12	3	1	72	36	+36	39	Promotion to OK Liga
2	PAS Alcoi	16	11	3	2	82	42	+40	36	Qualification to promotion playoffs
3	Sant Cugat	16	10	2	4	79	44	+35	32	
4	Barcelona B	16	9	3	4	50	36	+14	30	
5	SHUM Frit Ravich	16	9	3	4	51	44	+7	30	
6	Alcobendas	16	8	2	6	57	44	+13	26	
7	Sant Just	16	7	3	6	54	44	+10	24	
8	Sant Feliu	17	6	2	9	74	71	+3	20	
9	Santa María del Pilar	16	4	1	11	46	71	−25	13	
10	Rivas H2O	16	3	4	9	35	60	−25	13	
11	Las Rozas	17	3	1	13	29	68	−39	10	Relegation to OK Liga Bronce
12	Burguillos Extremadura	16	1	1	14	25	93	−68	4	Relegation to OK Liga Bronce

Updated to match(es) played on 8 March 2020. Source: FEP.es

=== OK Liga Bronce ===
The two non-Catalan groups were composed by:

- Group North: 3 teams from Galicia, 3 teams from Asturias and 2 teams from the Northern league
- Group South: 4 teams from Madrid and 4 teams from the Southern league.

Group North
Pos	Team	Pld	Pts
1	Patinalón	3	9
2	Areces	3	7
3	Compañía de María B	3	4
4	Iruña	3	4
5	Órdenes	3	4
6	Oviedo Roller	3	3
7	Urdaneta	2	0
8	Calvo Escola Lubiáns	2	0

Updated to match(es) played on 8 March 2020. Source: FEP

Group South
Pos	Team	Pld	Pts
1	Raspeig	3	9
2	Rivas Las Lagunas B	3	6
3	Alcorcón	2	4
4	Alhambra Cájar	3	4
5	Alcobendas B	3	3
6	Cocentaina	2	0
7	Virgen de Europa	2	0

Updated to match(es) played on 7 March 2020. Source: FEP

Catalan playoffs

== See also ==
- 2019–20 OK Liga Femenina
