= Hockey Roller Club Monza =

Italian roller hockey team

HRC Monza
- Full name: Hockey Roller Club Monza
- League: Serie A1
- Founded: 2007, as Hockey Monza e Brianza; 2013, as Hockey Roller Club Monza
- Home ground: PalaSomaschini, Seregno, Italy (Capacity 1560)

Personnel
- Chairman: Andrea Brambilla
- Manager: Ivan Jaquierz
- Website: Official website
Home	Away

Hockey Roller Club Monza is a roller hockey team from Monza, Italy. It was founded in 2007 as Hockey Monza e Brianza. Nowadays plays in the Lega Nazionale Hockey (Serie A1), the most important division in Italy.
