= 2018 Rink Hockey Continental Cup =

Tournament details
- Dates: 29–30 September 2018
- Teams: 4 (from 2 associations)

Final positions
- Champions: (Spain) Barcelona (18th title)
- Runners-up: (Portugal) Porto

Tournament statistics
- Matches played: 3
- Goals scored: 22 (7.33 per match)

The 2018 Rink Hockey Continental Cup was the 38th season of the Continental Cup, Europe's roller hockey Super Cup, organized by the World Skate Europe - Rink Hockey.

Four teams from two federations played for the title on 29 and 30 September 2018 in Barcelos, Portugal.

Spanish club Barcelona achieved their eighteenth title ever.

== Teams ==
Team	Qualified as	Appearance
(Spain) Barcelona	CERH European League champion	20th
(Portugal) Porto	CERH European League runner-up	5th
(Spain) Lleida Llista Blava	CERS Cup champion	1st
(Portugal) Barcelos	CERS Cup runner-up	3rd

== Bracket ==
Semi-finals
29 September
(Spain) Barcelona	6
(Portugal) Barcelos	2
29 September
(Spain) Lleida Llista Blava	3
(Portugal) Porto	5

Final
30 September
(Spain) Barcelona	3 (3)
(Portugal) Porto	3 (2)

== See also ==
- World Skate Europe - all competitions
