= Serie A1 (italian roller hockey) =

Roller hockey league

- Current season, competition or edition: 2025–26 Serie A1
- Sport: Roller Hockey
- Founded: 1922; 104 years ago
- Administrator: FISR
- No. of teams: 14
- Country: Italy
- Confederation: WSE
- Most recent champion: GSH Trissino (4th title) (2024–25)
- Most titles: Hockey Novara (32 titles)
- Broadcaster: Rai Sport
- Level on pyramid: Level 1
- Relegation to: Serie A2
- Domestic cups: Coppa Italia; Supercoppa
- International cups: European League; WS Europe Cup
- Website: Serie A1

The main Italian clubs competition is the Serie A1 (english Serie A1 italian roller). It contains 14 teams.

== History ==
The italian championship was formed in 1922 by the first teams who subscribed to the newborn italian federation FIPR (Federazione Italiana Pattinaggio a Rotelle).

After 3 years the teams attending the national championship were divided into two different federations and none of them controlled by the fascist regime so that the national team wasn't representing nor being nominated by the regime.

The CONI's President Lando Ferretti decided to close both federations acting a forced merging of skating and hockey teams into the new FIPR supervising the programmed developing of the roller skating sport in Italy.

The "italian championship" turned into "National Division", new denomination adopted from 1928 to 1942. Season 1942 had been last played one before the Allied forces entered Italy during WW2.

At the end of the war the championship had been reestablished on a national basis changing the name and adopting Serie A as commonly used for the football national championship.

In 1982 the Serie A and Serie B teams decided to developing both championships by nominating a new organization in order to directly run press information and championship fixtures. This organization took same italian basketball name and purposes copying part of the name: Lega Nazionale Hockey Pista. Offices were settled in Monza up to season 1986-1987. At the beginning of season 1987-1988 offices moved to Milan just to find a closer location suitable to air and railway main transport stations. The board of direction opted for the Stazione Centrale, in Via Ponte Seveso, just 100 meters away the railway station.

The board decided to change "Serie A" and "Serie B" into "Serie A1" and "Serie A2", leaving "Serie B" for the lower inter regional championships - the former "Serie C".

Serie A1 and Serie A2 are still the names of the top italian championships, but the "Lega Nazionale Hockey Pista" is no more organizing them because FIHP decided to close the milanese offices in 2018.

== Competition format ==
=== Regular season ===
The first stage (stagione regolare) is played as a regular league with each of the 14 teams playing each other home and away. A win is worth 3 points and a draw one. The last three teams are relegated to the Serie A2.

=== Play-out ===
The 11th and 12th placed teams face two teams from the Serie A2 in a best-out-of-3 series. The winners remain in the top league.

=== Championship play-off ===
The first eight placed teams of the regular season fight for the championship in an elimination format in a best-out-of-3 series. The final is played in a best-out-of-5 format with the winner claiming the national championship.

== Teams ==
Locations of the 2025–26 Serie A1 teams

Team	Location	Arena
AFP Giovinazzo	Giovinazzo	PalaPansini
Amatori Lodi	Lodi	PalaCastellotti
Azzurra Novara	Novara	Palasport Stefano Dal Lago
Bassano	Bassano del Grappa	PalaUbroker
Breganze	Breganze	PalaFerrarin
Castiglione	Castiglione della Pescaia	Pala Casa Mora
CGC Viareggio	Viareggio	PalaBarsacchi
Follonica	Follonica	Pista Armeni
Forte dei Marmi	Forte dei Marmi	PalaForte
Grosseto	Grosseto	Pista Mario Parri
HRC Monza	Monza	PalaRovagnati di Biassono
Sarzana	Sarzana	Pista Vecchio Mercato
Trissino	Trissino	PalaDante
Valdagno	Valdagno	PalaLido

== Champions ==
Year	Winner
1922	HC Polese
1923	HC Sempione
1924	HC Sempione (2)
1925	US Triestina
1926	US Triestina (2)
1927	US Triestina (3)
1928	US Triestina (4)
1929	US Triestina (5)
1930	Hockey Novara
1931	Hockey Novara (2)
1932	Hockey Novara (3)
1933	Hockey Novara (4)
1934	Hockey Novara (5)
1935	Milan SHC
1936	Hockey Novara (6)
1937	Pubblico Impiego Trieste (6)
1938	Pubblico Impiego Trieste (7)
1939	Pubblico Impiego Trieste (8)
1940	Pubblico Impiego Trieste (9)
1941	Pubblico Impiego Trieste (10)
1942	Pubblico Impiego Trieste (11)
1943	not held
1944	not held
1945	US Triestina (12)
1946	Hockey Novara (7)
1947	Hockey Novara (8)
1948	Edera Trieste
1949	Hockey Novara (9)
1950	Hockey Novara (10)
1951	Hockey Monza
1952	US Triestina (13)
1953	Hockey Monza (2)
1954	US Triestina (14)
1955	US Triestina (15)
1956	Hockey Monza (3)

Year	Winner
1957	Amatori Modena
1958	Hockey Novara (11)
1959	Hockey Novara (12)
1960	Amatori Modena (2)
1961	Hockey Monza (4)
1962	US Triestina (16)
1963	US Triestina (17)
1964	US Triestina (18)
1965	Hockey Monza (5)
1966	Hockey Monza (6)
1967	US Triestina (19)
1968	Hockey Monza (7)
1969	Hockey Novara (13)
1970	Hockey Novara (14)
1971	Hockey Novara (15)
1972	Hockey Novara (16)
1973	Hockey Novara (17)
1974	Hockey Novara (18)
1975	Hockey Novara (19)
1976	Hockey Breganze
1977	Hockey Novara (20)
1978	GSH Trissino
1979	Hockey Breganze (2)
1979–80	AFP Giovinazzo
1980–81	Amatori Lodi
1981–82	Reggiana Hockey
1982–83	Amatori Vercelli
1983–84	Amatori Vercelli (2)
1984–85	Hockey Novara (21)
1985–86	Amatori Vercelli (3)
1986–87	Hockey Novara (22)
1987–88	Hockey Novara (23)
1988–89	Roller Monza
1989–90	Roller Monza (2)
1990–91	Seregno Hockey
1991–92	Roller Monza (3)
1992–93	Hockey Novara (24)
1996–97	Hockey Novara (27)

Year	Winner
1993–94	Hockey Novara (25)
1994–95	Hockey Novara (26)
1995–96	Roller Monza (4)
1997–98	Hockey Novara (28)
1998–99	Hockey Novara (29)
1999–00	Hockey Novara (30)
2000–01	Hockey Novara (31)
2001–02	Hockey Novara (32)
2002–03	Primavera Prato
2003–04	Bassano Hockey 54
2004–05	Follonica Hockey
2005–06	Follonica Hockey (2)
2006–07	Follonica Hockey (3)
2007–08	Follonica Hockey (4)
2008–09	Bassano Hockey 54 (2)
2009–10	Hockey Valdagno
2010–11	CGC Viareggio
2011–12	Hockey Valdagno (2)
2012–13	Hockey Valdagno (3)
2013–14	Forte dei Marmi
2014–15	Forte dei Marmi (2)
2015–16	Forte dei Marmi (3)
2016–17	Amatori Lodi (2)
2017–18	Amatori Lodi (3)
2018–19	Forte dei Marmi (4)
2019–20	Abandoned (COVID-19 pandemic in Europe)
2020–21	Amatori Lodi (4)
2021–22	GSH Trissino (2)
2022–23	GSH Trissino (3)
2023–24	Forte dei Marmi (5)
2024–25	GSH Trissino (4)

== Wins by team ==
- Extinct clubs in italics.

Nr	Team	Year
32	Hockey Novara	1930, 1931, 1932, 1933, 1934, 1936, 1946, 1947, 1949, 1950, 1958, 1959, 1969, 1970, 1971, 1972, 1973, 1974, 1975, 1977, 1985, 1987, 1988, 1993, 1994, 1995, 1997, 1998, 1999, 2000, 2001, 2002
19	US Triestina/DPI Trieste	1925, 1926, 1927, 1928, 1929, 1937, 1938, 1939, 1940, 1941, 1942, 1945, 1952, 1954, 1955, 1962, 1963, 1964, 1967
7	Hockey Monza	1951, 1953, 1956, 1961, 1965, 1966, 1968
5	Forte dei Marmi	2014, 2015, 2016, 2019, 2024
4	Roller Monza	1989, 1990, 1992, 1996
4	Follonica	2005, 2006, 2007, 2008
4	Amatori Lodi	1981, 2017, 2018, 2021
4	GSH Trissino	1978, 2022, 2023, 2025
3	Amatori Vercelli	1983, 1984, 1986
3	Valdagno	2010, 2012, 2013
2	HC Sempione	1923, 1924
2	Amatori Modena	1957, 1960
2	Breganze	1976, 1979
2	Bassano 54	2004, 2009
1	HC Polese; Milan SHC; Edera Trieste; AFP Giovinazzo; Reggiana Hockey; Seregno Hockey; Primavera Prato; CGC Viareggio	1922; 1935; 1948; 1978; 1980; 1982; 1991; 2003; 2011
