= Copa del Rey de Hockey Patines =

Spanish rink hockey competition

- Sport: Roller hockey
- Founded: 1944
- No. of teams: 8
- Country: Spain
- Most recent champions: HC Liceo (2026)
- Most titles: FC Barcelona (26 titles)
- Broadcasters: Teledeporte, Esport3, RFEP TV
- Website: www.fep.es

The Copa del Rey de Hockey Patines is an annual Spanish rink hockey competition which is contested by eight teams. It held every year at a neutral venue. The first eight teams in standings just to half-season take part in Copa del Rey. The Copa del Rey's winners play in the next edition of CERS Cup.

== Competition format ==
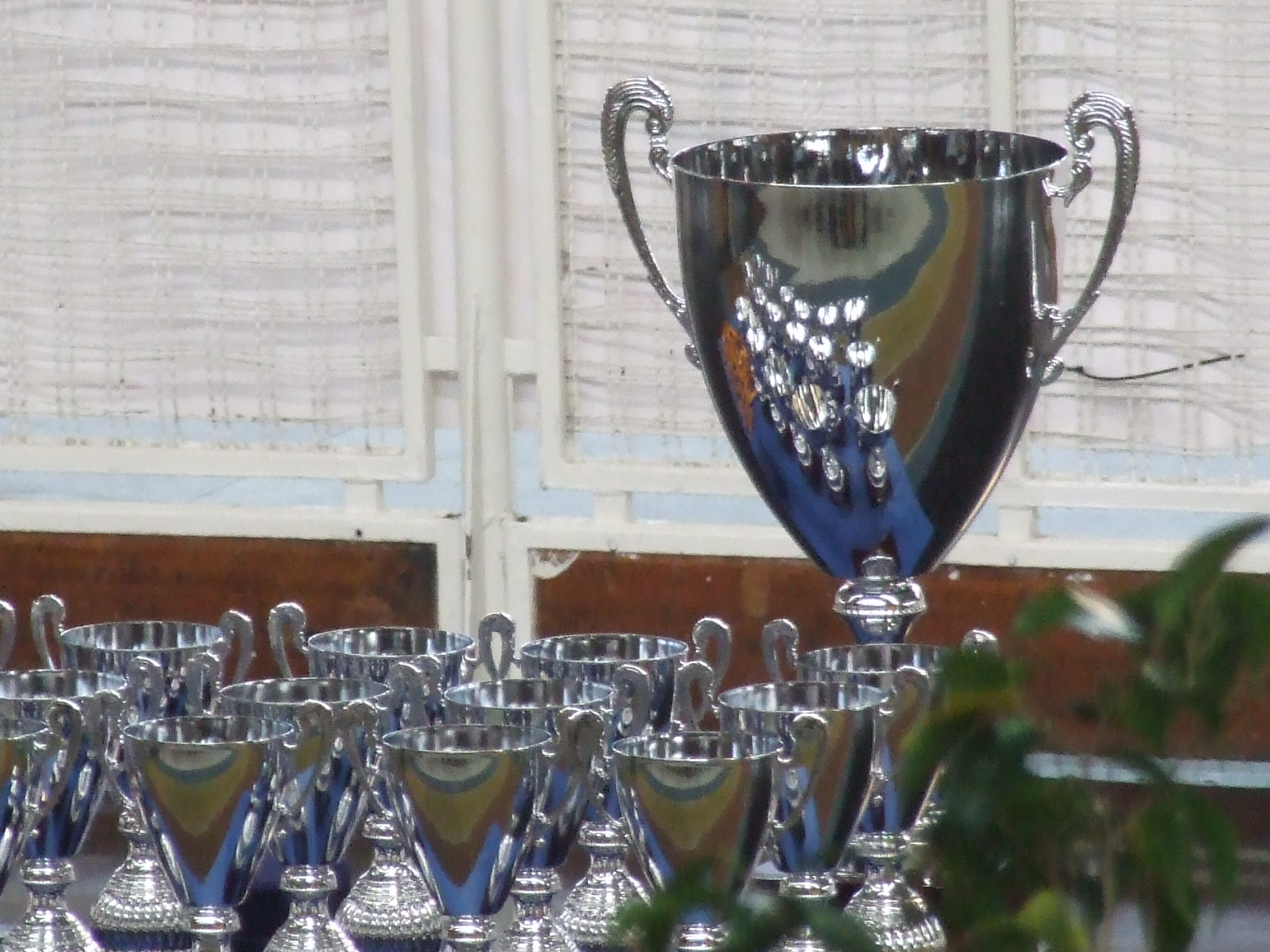
Trophy given to the winners.

Since 1999, the competition is played with a Final Eight format. At the end of the first half of the regular season, the top seven teams from the Spanish League and the host one, if it is not between these teams, qualify for the tournament. The eight teams play a play-off at one venue, over four days, eventually producing a winner.

== Champions by year ==
Year	Host	Winners	Runners-up	Score
1944	Barcelona	Espanyol	Cerdanyola	4–1
1945	Reus	Unió Barcelona	Girona	2–1
1946	Girona	Reus Ploms	Espanyol	6–3
1947	Barcelona	Espanyol	GEiEG	9–3
1948	Reus	Espanyol	Club Patí	3–1
1949	Barcelona	Espanyol	GEiEG	6–0
1950	Barcelona	Club Patí	Reus Deportiu	5–2
1951	Barcelona	Espanyol	Reus Deportiu	9–4
1952	Barcelona	Reus Deportiu	Espanyol	2–1
1953	Barcelona	FC Barcelona	Espanyol	2–1
1954	Valencia	Espanyol	Reus Deportiu	2–1
1955	Madrid	Espanyol	FC Barcelona	2–1
1956	Barcelona	Espanyol	FC Barcelona	2–1
1957	Salamanca	Espanyol	FC Barcelona	2–1
1958	Madrid	FC Barcelona	Espanyol	League
1959	Sant Hipòlit de Voltregà	Arrahona	Voltregà	League
1960	Barcelona	Voltregà	FC Barcelona	League
1961	Salt	Espanyol	Igualada	League
1962	Palma de Mallorca	Espanyol	Voltregà	League
1963	Cerdanyola del Vallès	FC Barcelona	Voltregà	League
1964	A Coruña	Vilanova	Voltregà	League
1965	Girona	Voltregà	Arrahona	2–0
1966	Barcelona	Reus Deportiu	Vilanova	1–0
1967	Mataró	Mataró	Vilanova	2–1
1968	Alicante	Vilanova	Montemar	2–1
1969	Sant Carles de la Ràpita	Voltregà	FC Barcelona	4–1
1970	Barcelona	Reus Deportiu	Voltregà	5–1
1971	Barcelona	Reus Deportiu	Noia	4–1
1972	Sabadell	FC Barcelona	Reus Deportiu	3–1
1973	Mieres	Reus Deportiu	Cerdanyola	5–4
1974	Sevilla	Voltregà	FC Barcelona	4–2
1975	Sabadell	FC Barcelona	Voltregà	3–1
1976	Alcoy	Vilanova	Voltregà	5–5
1977	Murcia	Voltregà	FC Barcelona	7–2
1978	Lloret de Mar	FC Barcelona	Voltregà	5–4
1979	Alcobendas	FC Barcelona	Reus Deportiu	2–0
1980	Salamanca	Cibeles	FC Barcelona	4–0
1981	Vic	FC Barcelona	Cibeles	4–2
1982	Alcoy	Liceo	Reus Deportiu	8–5
1983	Santa Cruz de Tenerife	Reus Deportiu	Liceo	4–1
1984	A Coruña	Liceo	FC Barcelona	4–2
1985	Palma de Mallorca	FC Barcelona	Liceo	7–0
1986	A Coruña / Barcelona	FC Barcelona	Liceo	3–3 / 5–2
1987	Barcelona / A Coruña	FC Barcelona	Liceo	12–3 / 6–6
1988	Oviedo	Liceo	Noia	Did not attend
1989	A Coruña / Igualada	Liceo	Igualada	7–7 / 4–3
1990	Alcobendas	Dominicos	Reus Deportiu	2–1
1991	Oviedo	Liceo	Voltregà	5–1
1992	Lloret de Mar	Igualada	Voltregà	2–1
1993	Santiago de Compostela	Igualada	Voltregà	6–3
1994	Sant Sadurní d'Anoia	FC Barcelona	Liceo	5–3
1995	Cerdanyola del Vallès	Liceo	Vic	5–2
1996	Cerdanyola del Vallès	Liceo	Igualada	5–4
1997	Alcobendas	Liceo	Igualada	9–3
1998	Blanes	Noia	Igualada	3–3
1999	Alcobendas	Vic	Igualada	6–6
2000	Blanes	FC Barcelona	Voltregà	3–3
2001	Sant Sadurní d'Anoia	Blanes	Voltregà	3–2
2002	Vic	FC Barcelona	Igualada	3–1
2003	Vilanova i la Geltrú	FC Barcelona	Vic	2–0
2004	Jerez de la Frontera	Liceo	Igualada	2–0
2005	Reus	FC Barcelona	Vic	2–0
2006	Lloret de Mar	Reus Deportiu	FC Barcelona	3–2
2007	Alcoy	FC Barcelona	Reus Deportiu	3–1
2008	Igualada	Noia	Vic	2–2 (p. 1–0)
2009	A Coruña	Vic	FC Barcelona	2–1
2010	Lloret de Mar	Vic	Vilanova	4–2
2011	Blanes	FC Barcelona	Reus Deportiu	4–2
2012	Vilanova i la Geltrú	FC Barcelona	Noia	3–2
2013	Oviedo	Vendrell	Reus Deportiu	4–3
2014	Lleida	Vendrell	FC Barcelona	6–3
2015	Blanes	Vic	FC Barcelona	2–1
2016	Reus	FC Barcelona	Vic	4–1
2017	Alcobendas	FC Barcelona	Reus Deportiu	4–3
2018	Lloret de Mar	FC Barcelona	Liceo	2–1
2019	Reus	FC Barcelona	Liceo	4–1
2021	A Coruña	Liceo	FC Barcelona	3–2
2022	Lleida	FC Barcelona	Reus Deportiu	4–0
2023	Calafell	FC Barcelona	Liceo	4–2
2024	Calafell	FC Barcelona	Sant Just	6–0
2025	Calafell	Reus Deportiu	CE Lleida Llista Blava	5–4
2026	Sant Sadurní d'Anoia	Liceo	Calafell	4–1

=== Performance by club ===
Club	Titles	Runners-up	Seasons
FC Barcelona	26	14	1953, 1958, 1963, 1972, 1975, 1978, 1979, 1981, 1985, 1986, 1987, 1994, 2000, 2002, 2003, 2005, 2007, 2011, 2012, 2016, 2017, 2018, 2019, 2022, 2023, 2024
Liceo	11	8	1982, 1984, 1988, 1989, 1991, 1995, 1996, 1997, 2004, 2021, 2026
Espanyol	11	4	1944, 1947, 1948, 1949, 1951, 1954, 1955, 1956, 1957, 1961, 1962
Reus Deportiu	8	12	1952, 1966, 1970, 1971, 1973, 1983, 2006, 2025
Voltregà	5	13	1960, 1965, 1969, 1974, 1977
Vic	4	5	1999, 2009, 2010, 2015
Vilanova	3	3	1964, 1968, 1976
Igualada	2	8	1992, 1993
Noia	2	3	1998, 2008
Moritz Vendrell	2	0	2013, 2014
Arrahona	1	1	1959
Cibeles	1	1	1980
Unió Barcelona	1	0	1945
Reus Ploms	1	0	1946
CP Barcelona	1	0	1950
Mataró	1	0	1967
Dominicos	1	0	1990
Blanes	1	0	2001
GEiEG	0	2	
Cerdanyola	0	2	
Girona	0	1	
Club Patí	0	1	
Montemar	0	1	
Sant Just	0	1	
CE Lleida Llista Blava	0	1	
Calafell	0	1	

=== Champions by Autonomous Communities ===
Titles	Autonomous Community
69	Catalonia
12	(Galicia (Spain)) Galicia
1	Asturias
82	TOTAL

== See also ==
- OK Liga
- Supercopa de España de Hockey Patines
