= CH Caldes =

- Full name: Club Hoquei Caldes
- League: OK Liga
- Founded: 1961
- Home ground: Pavelló Municipal de Caldes, Caldes de Montbui; Catalonia, Spain
Home

Club Hoquei Caldes, also known as Recam Làser Caldes for sponsorship reasons, is a Spanish sports club based in Caldes de Montbui, in the autonomous community of Catalonia. Founded in 1961, the club currently plays in the OK Liga.

== History ==
In 2015, Caldes achieved promotion to OK Liga, the second in a row. In its first season, the club ended in the fifth position, and consequently qualified for the first time to the CERS Cup.

In debut season, Caldes reached the semifinals where it was eliminated by Italian team CGC Viareggio.

== Season to season ==
Season	Tier	Division	Pos.	Copa del Rey	Europe	
2007–08	3	Nacional	10th			
2008–09	3	Nacional	11th			
2009–10	3	Nacional	6th			
2010–11	3	Nacional	3rd			
2011–12	3	Nacional	7th			
2012–13	3	Nacional	3rd			
2013–14	3	Nacional	1st			
2014–15	2	1ª División	3rd			
2015–16	1	OK Liga	5th	Quarterfinalist		
2016–17	1	OK Liga	11th		2 CERS Cup	SF
2017–18	1	OK Liga	9th			
2018–19	1	OK Liga	7th	Semifinalist	2 WS Europe Cup	R32
