= 2025–26 FC Barcelona Bàsquet season =

Spanish basketball club season

FC Barcelona
2025–26 season
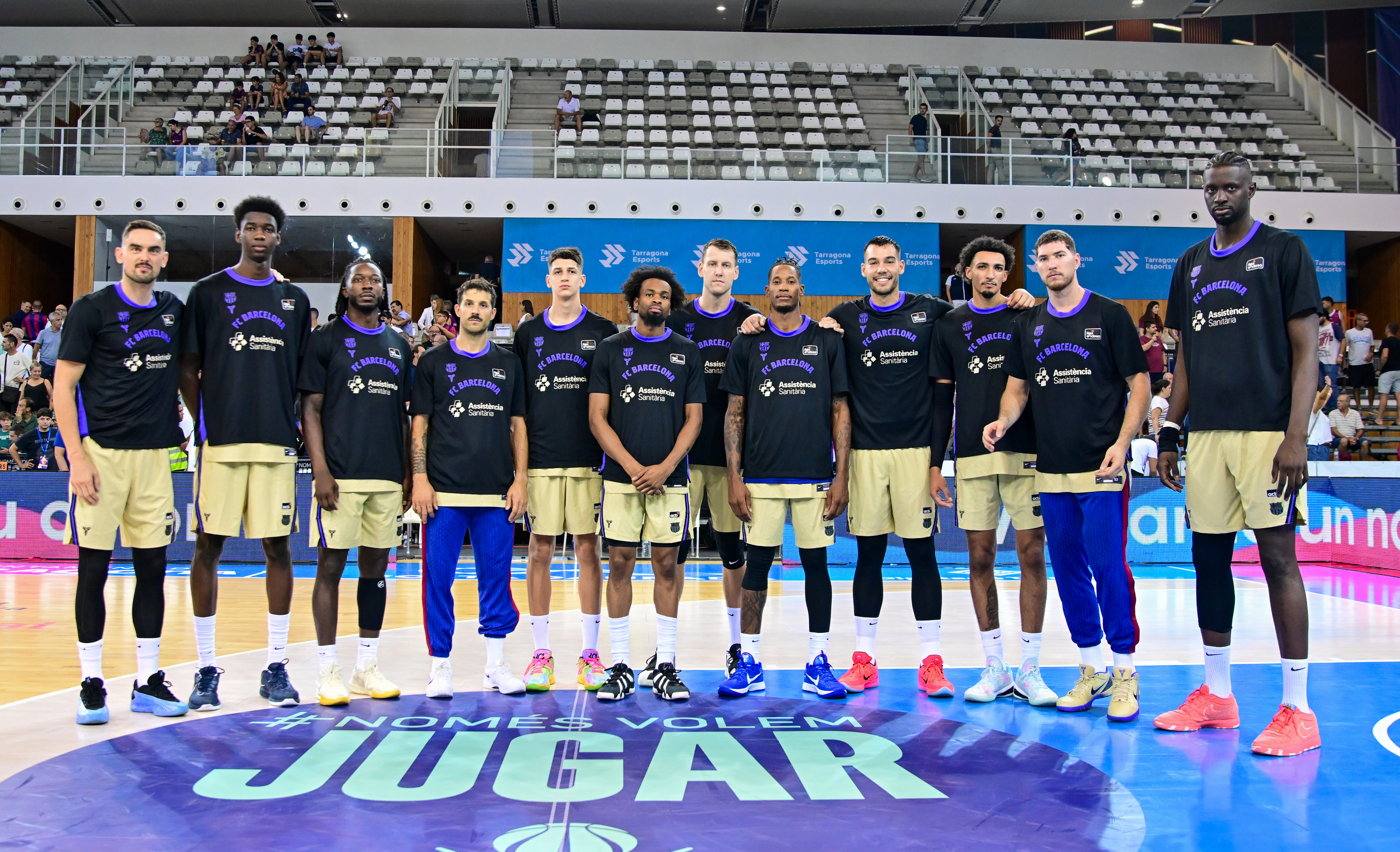
- FC Barcelona roster in September 2025
- President: Joan Laporta
- Head coach: Joan Peñarroya (September–November); Xavi Pascual (November–June)
- Arena: Palau Blaugrana
- Liga ACB: Runners-up
- EuroLeague: Play-in
- Copa del Rey: Semifinals
- Highest home attendance: 7,410 vs Valencia Basket (24 June 2026)
- Average home attendance: 5,514 (in EuroLeague); 5,391 (in Liga ACB)
- Biggest win: 108–71 vs Coviran Granada (11 January 2026); 97–60 vs BAXI Manresa (15 February 2026)
- Biggest defeat: 102–75 vs Valencia Basket (20 June 2026)
Home	Away
- All statistics correct as of 24 June 2026.

The 2025–26 season was FC Barcelona's 99th in existence, their 60th consecutive season in the top flight of Spanish basketball and 27th consecutive season in the EuroLeague.

In the 2025–26 season, FC Barcelona competed in the Liga ACB, the EuroLeague and the Copa del Rey.

== Overview ==
=== Pre-season ===
At the end of a 2024–25 season marked by injuries, general manager Juan Carlos Navarro announced Joan Peñarroya would remain as head coach for the following season. On 18 June, the club announced Víctor Sada was leaving his role as assistant coach. On July 25, the season's coaching staff was confirmed, with Albert Oliver taking over the vacant post left by Sada.

During the summer, both Joel Parra and Darío Brizuela signed contract extensions linking them to the club until 2028. While the club initially announced Youssoupha Fall would be leaving after his contract expired on June 30, his contract would eventually be extended for one more season on August 19.

American small forward Myles Cale was the first signing of the season on 20 June. He played the previous season for Dolomiti Energia Trento, with notable performances in the EuroCup. Point guard Juani Marcos reached an agreement for his return on 30 June, after spending only one season away with Bàsquet Girona. Georgian power forward Tornike Shengelia was the third addition of the summer, being announced on July 21. Shengelia last played for Virtus Bologna and had previous Liga ACB experience with Baskonia and Valencia. On 23 July, veteran EuroLeague forward Will Clyburn was signed on a two-season deal. Clyburn also played the previous season with Virtus Bologna. On August 22, American power forward Miles Norris was announced as the summer's last addition, previously playing on a two-way contract for the Boston Celtics and the affiliated Maine Celtics.

Unexpectedly, Barcelona announced on 23 June that an agreement had been reached to part ways with star player Jabari Parker, after two seasons at the club. Parker would go on the join Partizan. Several players would leave the team after their contract expired on 30 June, including Justin Anderson and Chimezie Metu. Team captain Álex Abrines announced his retirement on 22 July, after ten seasons at the club, playing 660 games and winning 15 trophies. On August 1, the club announced it was parting ways with center James Nnaji, after he had spent the previous season on loan with Bàsquet Girona and Merkezefendi.

=== Managerial change ===
After a poor start of the season, with especially negative results in the Liga ACB, the club decided to fire head coach Joan Peñarroya. The decision was announced on November 9, 2025, after an away loss against Bàsquet Girona. Assistant coach Óscar Orellana was named interim coach until a new head coach was appointed. On November 13, 2025, Xavi Pascual was announced as the new head coach, 9 year after his previous stint at the helm of FC Barcelona. Officially taking over the job on November 17, Pascual signed a contract until 2028.

== Players ==
=== Roster ===
Note: Flags indicate national team eligibility at FIBA-sanctioned events. Players may hold other non-FIBA nationalities not displayed.

FC Barcelona roster
Players
Coaches

Pos.	No.	Nat.	Name	Ht.	Wt.	Age
SG	0	(United States) (Serbia)	Punter, Kevin	1.93 m (6 ft 4 in)	81 kg (179 lb)	32 – 25 June 1993
PG	2	(Argentina) (Italy)	Marcos, Juani	1.90 m (6 ft 3 in)	80 kg (176 lb)	26 – 10 April 2000
SF	3	(United States)	Cale, Myles	1.98 m (6 ft 6 in)	95 kg (209 lb)	27 – 5 March 1999
PF	5	(United States)	Norris, Miles	2.06 m (6 ft 9 in)	100 kg (220 lb)	26 – 15 April 2000
F/C	6	(Czech Republic)	Veselý, Jan	2.13 m (7 ft 0 in)	110 kg (243 lb)	36 – 24 April 1990
SG	8	(Spain)	Brizuela, Darío	1.88 m (6 ft 2 in)	78 kg (172 lb)	31 – 8 November 1994
PG	13	(Czech Republic)	Satoranský, Tomáš (C)	2.00 m (6 ft 7 in)	95 kg (209 lb)	34 – 30 October 1991
C	14	(Spain)	Hernangómez, Willy	2.10 m (6 ft 11 in)	113 kg (249 lb)	32 – 27 May 1994
PG	17	(Spain)	Núñez, Juan	1.94 m (6 ft 4 in)	86 kg (190 lb)	22 – 4 June 2004
C	19	(Senegal) (France)	Fall, Youssoupha	2.22 m (7 ft 3 in)	125 kg (276 lb)	31 – 12 January 1995
G	20	(Argentina) (Italy)	Laprovíttola, Nicolás	1.91 m (6 ft 3 in)	82 kg (181 lb)	36 – 31 January 1990
F	21	(United States)	Clyburn, Will	2.01 m (6 ft 7 in)	95 kg (209 lb)	36 – 17 May 1990
PF	23	(Georgia (country))	Shengelia, Tornike	2.06 m (6 ft 9 in)	109 kg (240 lb)	34 – 5 October 1991
C	41	(Mali)	Keita, Sayon (Y)	2.12 m (6 ft 11 in)	93 kg (205 lb)	18 – 1 March 2008
SF	43	(Serbia)	Kusturica, Nikola (Y)	2.03 m (6 ft 8 in)	90 kg (198 lb)	17 – 30 April 2009
F	44	(Spain)	Parra, Joel	2.03 m (6 ft 8 in)	88 kg (194 lb)	26 – 4 April 2000

Head coach

- (Spanish Basketball Federation) Xavi Pascual

Assistant coach(es)

- (Spanish Basketball Federation) Óscar Orellana
- (Spanish Basketball Federation) Iñigo Zorzano
- (Spanish Basketball Federation) Albert Oliver

Team manager

- (Spanish Basketball Federation) Juan Carlos Navarro

Legend

- (C) Team captain
- (Y) Youth player
- Injured

- Roster
- Transactions

=== Depth chart ===
Pos.	Starting 5	Bench 1	Bench 2	Bench 3
C	Jan Veselý	Youssoupha Fall	Willy Hernangómez †	Sayon Keita ‡
PF	Tornike Shengelia †	Joel Parra †	Miles Norris *
SF	Will Clyburn *	Myles Cale *		Nikola Kusturica ‡
SG	Kevin Punter	Darío Brizuela †	Nicolás Laprovíttola
PG	Tomáš Satoranský	Juani Marcos	Juan Núñez †

Notes: Blue † – homegrown player; (Note: A homegrown player is a player that played for at least three years before the age of 20 on a Spanish team. In Liga ACB, the team must register at least four homegrown players in rosters of 10–12 players or at least three homegrown players in rosters of 8–9 players. In EuroLeague, the team did not have any limitations regarding the number of homegrown players.) Red * – overseas player; (Note: An overseas player is a player from outside EEA, FIBA Europe or ACP states. In Liga ACB, the team may register at most two overseas players. In EuroLeague, the team did not have any limitations regarding the number of overseas players.) Green ‡ – youth player (Note: In Liga ACB, the team may register under-22 players linked to the youth system. In EuroLeague, the team may register under-20 players linked to the youth system.)

=== Roster changes ===
==== In ====
No.	Pos.	Nat.	Name	Moving from		Type	Date	Source
3	SF	(United States)	Myles Cale	Aquila Basket Trento	(Italy)	End of contract	20 Jun 2025	
2	PG	(Argentina)	Juani Marcos	Bàsquet Girona	(Spain)	Contract buyout	30 Jun 2025	
23	PF	(Georgia (country))	Tornike Shengelia	Virtus Bologna	(Italy)	End of contract	21 Jul 2025	
21	SF	(United States)	Will Clyburn	Virtus Bologna	(Italy)	Parted ways	23 Jul 2025	
5	PF	(United States)	Miles Norris	Boston Celtics	(United States)	Waived	22 Aug 2025	

==== Out ====
No.	Pos.	Nat.	Name	Moving to		Type	Date	Source
22	PF	(United States)	Jabari Parker	Partizan	(Serbia)	Parted ways	23 Jun 2025	
2	G/F	(Italy)	Dame Sarr	Duke Blue Devils	(United States)	End of contract	30 Jun 2025	
1	SF	(United States)	Justin Anderson	Dubai Basketball	(United Arab Emirates)	End of contract	30 Jun 2025	
10	PF/C	(Nigeria)	Chimezie Metu	Gran Canaria	(Spain)	End of contract	30 Jun 2025	
21	SF	(Spain)	Álex Abrines			Retirement	22 Jul 2025	
23	C	(Nigeria)	James Nnaji	Baylor Bears	(United States)	Parted ways	1 Aug 2025	

== Pre-season and friendlies ==
=== Friendly matches ===
6 September 2025	FC Barcelona (Catalonia)	91–90	(French Federation of Basketball) Paris Basketball	Encamp
12:00	Scoring by quarter: 25–19, 23–22, 26–27, 17–22
	Pts: Laprovíttola 23; Rebs: Keita 6 Asts: Núñez 5 PIR: Laprovíttola 16	Boxscore	Pts: Robinson 20; Rebs: Faye 9 Asts: Ayayi 4 PIR: Faye 12	Arena: Complex Esportiu i Sociocultural d'Encamp; Attendance: 200; Referees: Òscar Perea, Alberto Baena, Igor Esteve

12 September 2025 Torneig Platja d’Aro	Bàsquet Girona (Catalonia)	77–88	(Catalonia) FC Barcelona	Platja d'Aro
20:30	Scoring by quarter: 22–26, 19–23, 20–22, 16–17
	Pts: Livingston 21; Rebs: Busquets, Martínez 5 Asts: Geben, Ferrando 5 PIR: Livingston 19	Boxscore	Pts: Parra 19; Rebs: Fall 8 Asts: Laprovíttola 5 PIR: Clyburn, Parra 22	Arena: Palau d'Esports i Congressos; Attendance: 985; Referees: Victor Mas, José María Olivares, Miguel Remisa

26 September 2025 Trofeu Ciutat de Lleida	Hiopos Lleida (Catalonia)	74–63	(Catalonia) FC Barcelona	Lleida
20:00	Scoring by quarter: 21–22, 11–12, 15–12, 27–17
	Pts: Agada 14; Rebs: Agada 8 Asts: three players 4 PIR: Agada 24	Boxscore	Pts: Punter 11; Rebs: Laprovíttola 5 Asts: Satoranský 3 PIR: Shengelia 13	Arena: Pavelló Barris Nord; Attendance: 4,067; Referees: Martín Caballero, Carlos Merino, Fábio Fernández

=== Lliga Catalana de Bàsquet ===
17 September 2025	MoraBanc Andorra (Andorran Basketball Federation)	81–90	(Catalonia) FC Barcelona	Tarragona
21:00	Scoring by quarter: 20–23, 16–23, 18–15, 27–29
	Pts: Evans 22; Rebs: Kuric, McKoy 4 Asts: Evans, Kuric 4 PIR: Evans 23	Boxscore	Pts: Punter 16; Rebs: Hernangómez 6 Asts: Laprovíttola 8 PIR: Hernangómez 20	Arena: Palau d'Esports Catalunya; Attendance: 1,407; Referees: Jordi Aliaga Solé, Arnau Padrós Feliu, Yasmina Alcaraz Moreno

19 September 2025	FC Barcelona (Catalonia)	80–81	(Catalonia) Joventut Badalona	Tarragona
21:00	Scoring by quarter: 17–21, 21–16, 23–25, 19–19
	Pts: Satoranský 14; Rebs: Fall 6 Asts: Laprovíttola, Satoranský 3 PIR: Satoranský 15	Boxscore	Pts: Hunt 25; Rebs: Tomić 6 Asts: Rubio 5 PIR: Hunt 24	Arena: Palau d'Esports Catalunya; Attendance: 1,151; Referees: Jordi Aliaga Solé, Juan de Dios Oyón Cauqui, Yasmina Alcaraz Moreno

== Competitions ==
=== Overview ===
Competition	First match	Last match	Starting round	Final position	Record							
Competition	First match	Last match	Starting round	Final position	Pld	W	D	L	PF	PA	PD	Win %
Liga ACB	5 October 2025	24 June 2026	Round 1	Runners-up	44	30		14	3,958	3,691	+267	68.18
EuroLeague	30 September 2025	24 April 2026	Round 1	Play-in	40	22		18	3,317	3,298	+19	55.00
Copa del Rey	20 February 2026	21 February 2026	Quarter-finals	Semi-finals	2	1		1	158	155	+3	50.00
Total					86	53	0	33	7,433	7,144	+289	61.63

Last updated: 24 June 2026
Source: Competitions

=== Liga ACB ===
==== League table ====
Pos	Team	Pld	W	L	PF	PA	PD	Qualification or relegation
3	Kosner Baskonia	34	25 (Note: Head–to–head record: Valencia Basket 2–2 (+14), Kosner Baskonia 2–2 (+2), UCAM Murcia 2–2 (−16).)	9	3177	2950	+227	Qualification to playoffs
4	UCAM Murcia	34	25	9	3113	2876	+237	Qualification to playoffs
5	Barça	34	24	10	3046	2815	+231	Qualification to playoffs
6	Asisa Joventut	34	22	12	2906	2766	+140	Qualification to playoffs
7	Surne Bilbao	34	19	15	2884	2924	−40	Qualification to playoffs

Source: ACB
Rules for classification: 1) Win–loss record; 2) Head–to–head record; 3) Head–to–head point difference; 4) Point difference; 5) Points scored; 6) Sum of quotients of points scored (Note: Head–to–head record is used only after all the matches between the teams in question have been played)

==== Results summary ====
Overall						Home					Away				
Pld	W	L	PF	PA	PD	W	L	PF	PA	PD	W	L	PF	PA	PD
34	24	10	3046	2815	+231	12	5	1553	1377	+176	12	5	1493	1438	+55

Source: Competitive matches

==== Results by round ====
Round	1	2	3	4	5	6	7	8	9	10	11	12	13	14	15	16	17	18	19	20	21	22	23	24	25	26	27	28	29	30	31	32	33	34
Ground	A	H	A	H	H	A	H	A	H	A	H	A	H	A	H	A	H	A	H	H	A	A	H	H	A	H	A	A	H	H	A	A	H	A
Result	L	L	W	W	L	L	W	W	W	W	W	W	W	W	W	W	L	L	W	W	W	L	L	W	W	W	L	W	W	W	W	W	L	W
Position	12	13	12	9	10	11	9	7	7	7	5	5	4	4	3	3	3	3	3	4	3	3	5	6	5	5	5	4	4	4	3	3	5	5

Source: Competitive matches
A = Away; H = Home; W = Win; L = Loss; R = Rest

==== Matches ====
5 October 2025 1	Valencia Basket	93–81	FC Barcelona	Valencia
19:00	Scoring by quarter: 24–15, 22–18, 23–25, 24–23
	Pts: Thompson 16; Rebs: Costello, Moore 6 Asts: de Larrea 6 PIR: Thompson 25	Boxscore	Pts: Clyburn 16; Rebs: Clyburn 9 Asts: Satoranský 5 PIR: Clyburn 23	Arena: Roig Arena; Attendance: 14,818; Referees: Carlos Peruga, Luis Miguel Castillo, Fabio Fernández

12 October 2025 2	FC Barcelona	86–91	Hiopos Lleida	Barcelona
12:15	Scoring by quarter: 21–25, 22–23, 22–15, 21–28
	Pts: Shengelia 20; Rebs: Cale, Fall 6 Asts: Brizuela 5 PIR: Shengelia 25	Boxscore	Pts: Agada 18; Rebs: Jiménez 6 Asts: three players 3 PIR: Agada 17	Arena: Palau Blaugrana; Attendance: 4,616; Referees: Jordi Aliaga, Javier Torres, Alberto Baena

19 October 2025 3	Unicaja	77–83	FC Barcelona	Málaga
19:00	Scoring by quarter: 18–22, 16–17, 23–23, 20–21
	Pts: three players 11; Rebs: Kravish, Pérez 6 Asts: Perry 3 PIR: Pérez, Perry 15	Boxscore	Pts: Shengelia 18; Rebs: Clyburn 6 Asts: three players 3 PIR: Punter 21	Arena: Martín Carpena; Attendance: 10,309; Referees: Emilio Pérez Pizarro, Francisco Araña, Vicente Martínez

25 October 2025 4	FC Barcelona	100–85	Río Breogán	Barcelona
19:00	Scoring by quarter: 28–18, 16–23, 28–26, 28–18
	Pts: Clyburn 21; Rebs: Parra 5 Asts: Parra, Shengelia 4 PIR: Parra 22	Boxscore	Pts: Alonso 17; Rebs: Dibba 4 Asts: Mavra 6 PIR: Alonso 20	Arena: Palau Blaugrana; Attendance: 4,389; Referees: Fernando Calatrava, Juan de Dios Oyón, Rubén Sánchez Mohedas

2 November 2025 5	FC Barcelona	78–81	UCAM Murcia	Barcelona
17:00	Scoring by quarter: 16–34, 26–22, 19–17, 17–8
	Pts: Shengelia 21; Rebs: Clyburn 8 Asts: Satoranský 4 PIR: Shengelia 21	Boxscore	Pts: Cacok 20; Rebs: Raieste 9 Asts: Ennis 9 PIR: Cacok 20	Arena: Palau Blaugrana; Attendance: 4,291; Referees: Luis Miguel Castillo, Arnau Padrós, Iyán González

9 November 2025 6	Bàsquet Girona	96–78	FC Barcelona	Girona
12:15	Scoring by quarter: 30–18, 17–15, 30–21, 19–24
	Pts: Busquets 18; Rebs: Marić 6 Asts: Livingston 6 PIR: Livingston 21	Boxscore	Pts: Hernangómez 18; Rebs: Clyburn 7 Asts: Satoranský 4 PIR: Hernangómez 21	Arena: Fontajau; Attendance: 5,427; Referees: Martín Caballero, Alberto Sánchez Sixto, Esperanza Mendoza

16 November 2025 7	FC Barcelona	91–83	Baskonia	Barcelona
19:00	Scoring by quarter: 19–19, 20–24, 31–19, 21–21
	Pts: Clyburn 24; Rebs: Shengelia 7 Asts: Satoranský 6 PIR: Clyburn 23	Boxscore	Pts: Luwawu-Cabarrot 21; Rebs: Kurucs 11; Asts: three players 3 PIR: Diakite 20	Arena: Palau Blaugrana; Attendance: 5,168; Referees: Óscar Perea, Sergio Manuel, Carlos Merino

23 November 2025 8	Dreamland Gran Canaria	61–72	FC Barcelona	Las Palmas
19:00	Scoring by quarter: 17–14, 12–18, 17–14, 15–26
	Pts: Tobey 16; Rebs: Tobey 9 Asts: Brussino 7 PIR: Tobey 17	Boxscore	Pts: Laprovíttola, Shengelia 14; Rebs: Hernangómez 7 Asts: Parra, Satoranský 3 PIR: Shengelia 17	Arena: Gran Canaria Arena; Attendance: 7,624; Referees: Antonio Conde, Rafael Serrano, Roberto Lucas

7 December 2025 9	FC Barcelona	102–71	MoraBanc Andorra	Barcelona
17:00	Scoring by quarter: 16–14, 22–16, 35–21, 29–20
	Pts: Parra 24; Rebs: Parra 9 Asts: Marcos 6 PIR: Parra 34	Boxscore	Pts: Evans 12; Rebs: three players 4 Asts: Evans 7 PIR: Evans 20	Arena: Palau Blaugrana; Attendance: 5,240; Referees: Carlos Peruga, Vicente Martínez, Igor Esteve

14 December 2025 10	BAXI Manresa	62–89	FC Barcelona	Manresa
19:00	Scoring by quarter: 21–28, 16–22, 17–21, 8–18
	Pts: Reyes 16; Rebs: Olinde 4 Asts: Gaspà 6 PIR: Reyes 15	Boxscore	Pts: Brizuela 22; Rebs: Hernangómez 9 Asts: Satoranský 7 PIR: Satoranský 24	Arena: Nou Congost; Attendance: 4,960; Referees: Carlos Cortés, Juan de Dios Oyón, Yasmina Alcaraz

21 December 2025 11	FC Barcelona	90–80	Joventut	Barcelona
12:30	Scoring by quarter: 26–17, 8–23, 31–15, 25–25
	Pts: Punter 20; Rebs: Parra 8 Asts: Satoranský 7 PIR: Satoranský 24	Boxscore	Pts: Tomić 19; Rebs: Tomić 7 Asts: Rubio 6 PIR: Tomić 17	Arena: Palau Blaugrana; Attendance: 6,503; Referees: Rafael Serrano, Joaquín García, Ariadna Chueca

28 December 2025 12	Surne Bilbao Basket	66–71	FC Barcelona	Bilbao
17:00	Scoring by quarter: 25–16, 8–18, 13–15, 20–22
	Pts: Bagayoko 14; Rebs: Bagayoko 7 Asts: Krampelj 3 PIR: Bagayoko 20	Boxscore	Pts: Hernangómez 19; Rebs: Hernangómez 7 Asts: Satoranský 6 PIR: Hernangómez 26	Arena: Bilbao Arena; Attendance: 9,734; Referees: Fernando Calatrava, Jorge Martínez, Carlos Merino

2 January 2026 13	FC Barcelona	100–80	Casademont Zaragoza	Barcelona
20:00	Scoring by quarter: 21–22, 27–11, 25–22, 27–25
	Pts: Norris 15; Rebs: Fall 9 Asts: three players 3 PIR: Fall 20	Boxscore	Pts: Rodríguez 12; Rebs: Bell-Haynes 5 Asts: Bell-Haynes 5 PIR: Bell-Haynes, Rodríguez 14	Arena: Palau Blaugrana; Attendance: 5,725; Referees: Martín Caballero, Esperanza Mendoza, Andrés Fernández

4 January 2026 14	Real Madrid	100–105	FC Barcelona	Madrid
12:30	Scoring by quarter: 24–28, 20–20, 31–29, 25–28
	Pts: Hezonja 30; Rebs: Hezonja 4 Asts: Llull 8 PIR: Hezonja 30	Boxscore	Pts: Laprovíttola, Punter 19; Rebs: Hernangómez 10; Asts: Laprovíttola 9 PIR: Laprovíttola 27	Arena: Movistar Arena; Attendance: 11,736; Referees: Carlos Peruga, Carlos Cortés, Alberto Sánchez Sixto

11 January 2026 15	FC Barcelona	108–71	Coviran Granada	Barcelona
17:00	Scoring by quarter: 26–22, 35–12, 25–16, 22–21
	Pts: Fall 15; Rebs: Parra 5 Asts: Laprovíttola 6 PIR: Fall 19	Boxscore	Pts: Pérez 21; Rebs: Pérez 4 Asts: Božić 5 PIR: Pérez 27	Arena: Palau Blaugrana; Attendance: 5,082; Referees: Arnau Padrós, Rubén Sánchez Mohedas, Guillermo Ríos

18 January 2026 16	San Pablo Burgos	79–80	FC Barcelona	Burgos
12:00	Scoring by quarter: 19–12, 19–21, 18–24, 23–23
	Pts: Samuels 23; Rebs: Meindl 6 Asts: Neto 5 PIR: Samuels 25	Boxscore	Pts: Laprovíttola 23; Rebs: Hernangómez 8 Asts: Punter 6 PIR: Hernangómez 25	Arena: Coliseum Burgos; Attendance: 8,979; Referees: Rafael Serrano, Alberto Baena, Esperanza Mendoza

25 January 2026 17	FC Barcelona	82–89	La Laguna Tenerife	Barcelona
19:30	Scoring by quarter: 17–23, 28–13, 21–26, 16–27
	Pts: Veselý 17; Rebs: Norris 7 Asts: Satoranský 5 PIR: Norris 21	Boxscore	Pts: Shermadini 14; Rebs: Shermadini 5 Asts: Fernández, Huertas 5 PIR: Shermadini 18	Arena: Palau Blaugrana; Attendance: 5,472; Referees: Jordi Aliaga, Francisco Araña, Igor Esteve

1 February 2026 18	UCAM Murcia	84–83	FC Barcelona	Murcia
19:00	Scoring by quarter: 18–30, 24–21, 19–17, 23–15
	Pts: Cacok 23; Rebs: Cacok, Nakić 5 Asts: Ennis 9 PIR: Cacok 25	Boxscore	Pts: Laprovíttola 15; Rebs: Fall 4 Asts: Laprovíttola 9 PIR: Laprovíttola 22	Arena: Palacio de Deportes; Attendance: 7,308; Referees: Carlos Cortés, Jorge Martínez, Carlos Merino

8 February 2026 19	FC Barcelona	97–92	Bàsquet Girona	Barcelona
19:00	Scoring by quarter: 32–22, 20–18, 20–27, 25–25
	Pts: Clyburn 21; Rebs: Shengelia 6 Asts: Laprovíttola 6 PIR: Hernangómez 21	Boxscore	Pts: Busquets 22; Rebs: Geben 8 Asts: Livingston 10; PIR: Geben 20	Arena: Palau Blaugrana; Attendance: 5,450; Referees: Fernando Calatrava, Iyán González, Esperanza Mendoza

15 February 2026 20	FC Barcelona	97–60	BAXI Manresa	Barcelona
17:00	Scoring by quarter: 22–14, 21–17, 30–12, 24–17
	Pts: Clyburn 14; Rebs: Fall 12; Asts: Laprovíttola, Parra 4 PIR: Parra 19	Boxscore	Pts: Reyes, Ubal 10; Rebs: Reyes 9 Asts: Bassas 4 PIR: Reyes 14	Arena: Palau Blaugrana; Attendance: 5,896; Referees: Luis Miguel Castillo, Joaquín García, Guillermo Ríos

8 March 2026 21	Río Breogán	78–109	FC Barcelona	Lugo
12:15	Scoring by quarter: 13–27, 18–30, 11–26, 36–26
	Pts: three players 13; Rebs: Branković 6 Asts: Quintela 5 PIR: Mavra 16	Boxscore	Pts: Cale 24; Rebs: Shengelia 6 Asts: Marcos 6 PIR: Shengelia 26	Arena: Pazo dos Deportes; Attendance: 5,310; Referees: Carlos Peruga, Francisco Araña, David Sánchez

15 March 2026 22	Joventut	84–72	FC Barcelona	Badalona
19:00	Scoring by quarter: 19–15, 23–22, 22–21, 20–14
	Pts: Hunt, Rubio 17; Rebs: Tomić 8 Asts: Håkanson 5 PIR: Rubio 24	Boxscore	Pts: Parra 19; Rebs: Clyburn 5 Asts: Clyburn 4 PIR: Parra 20	Arena: Palau Municipal d'Esports; Attendance: 12,179; Referees: Óscar Perea, Arnau Padrós, Cristóbal Sánchez

22 March 2026 23	FC Barcelona	76–95	Real Madrid	Barcelona
19:00	Scoring by quarter: 18–15, 15–36, 20–20, 23–24
	Pts: Veselý 15; Rebs: Clyburn, Parra 4 Asts: Satoranský 4 PIR: Clyburn 16	Boxscore	Pts: Campazzo 15; Rebs: Tavares 7 Asts: Campazzo 5 PIR: Campazzo 20	Arena: Palau Blaugrana; Attendance: 7,032; Referees: Antonio Conde, Rafael Serrano, Joaquín García

29 March 2026 24	FC Barcelona	97–91	Unicaja	Barcelona
19:00	Scoring by quarter: 22–17, 25–24, 27–28, 23–22
	Pts: Veselý 18; Rebs: Veselý 7 Asts: Satoranský 5 PIR: Veselý	Boxscore	Pts: Sulejmanović 19; Rebs: three players 5 Asts: Perry 5 PIR: Balcerowski 24	Arena: Palau Blaugrana; Attendance: 4,964; Referees: Emilio Pérez Pizarro, Alfonso Olivares, Igor Esteve

5 April 2026 25	Casademont Zaragoza	86–92	FC Barcelona	Zaragoza
19:00	Scoring by quarter: 25–32, 14–18, 27–22, 20–20
	Pts: Yusta 32; Rebs: Dubljević 7 Asts: Spissu 5 PIR: Yusta 32	Boxscore	Pts: Punter 22; Rebs: Norris, Shengelia 6 Asts: Parra 6 PIR: Shengelia 21	Arena: Pabellón Príncipe Felipe; Attendance: 6,052; Referees: Rafael Serrano, Juan de Dios Oyón, Raúl Zamorano

12 April 2026 26	FC Barcelona	90–61	Surne Bilbao Basket	Barcelona
17:00	Scoring by quarter: 21–7, 20–16, 24–20, 25–18
	Pts: Fall 17; Rebs: Parra 8 Asts: five players 3 PIR: Parra 23	Boxscore	Pts: Krampelj 16; Rebs: Pantzar 5 Asts: three players 3 PIR: Krampelj 17	Arena: Palau Blaugrana; Attendance: 5,889; Referees: Jordi Aliaga, Javier Torres, Cristóbal Sánchez

19 April 2026 27	Hiopos Lleida	90–80	FC Barcelona	Lleida
12:00	Scoring by quarter: 24–21, 17–25, 24–15, 25–19
	Pts: Paulí 27; Rebs: Ejim 9 Asts: Krutwig, Paulí 7 PIR: Paulí 35	Boxscore	Pts: Brizuela 21; Rebs: Veselý 5 Asts: Clyburn 5 PIR: Brizuela 19	Arena: Pavelló Barris Nord; Attendance: 5,579; Referees: Óscar Perea, Sergio Manuel, Vicente Martínez

26 April 2026 28	Baskonia	92–95	FC Barcelona	Vitoria-Gasteiz
12:15	Scoring by quarter: 20–26, 25–21, 24–21, 23–27
	Pts: Simmons 25; Rebs: Diakite 7 Asts: Simmons 5 PIR: Simmons 27	Boxscore	Pts: Shengelia 20; Rebs: Parra 7 Asts: Marcos 4 PIR: Shengelia 26	Arena: Buesa Arena; Attendance: 10,153; Referees: Antonio Conde, Jorge Martínez, Carlos Merino

3 May 2026 29	FC Barcelona	91–69	Dreamland Gran Canaria	Barcelona
19:00	Scoring by quarter: 29–20, 19–14, 17–12, 26–23
	Pts: Punter 23; Rebs: Norris 7 Asts: Brizuela 3 PIR: Punter 24	Boxscore	Pts: Robertson 14; Rebs: Pelos 6 Asts: three players 2 PIR: Alocén, Robertson 14	Arena: Palau Blaugrana; Attendance: 3,861; Referees: Luis Miguel Castillo, Alberto Sánchez Sixto, Rubén Sánchez Mohedas

9 May 2026 30	FC Barcelona	91–76	San Pablo Burgos	Barcelona
18:00	Scoring by quarter: 29–15, 26–20, 18–22, 18–19
	Pts: Punter 17; Rebs: Hernangómez 10; Asts: Núñez 6 PIR: Fall 21	Boxscore	Pts: Heidegger 24; Rebs: three players 6 Asts: Guðmundsson, Neto 3 PIR: Heidegger 20	Arena: Palau Blaugrana; Attendance: 4,192; Referees: Martín Caballero, Iyán González, Andrés Fernández

13 May 2026 31	Coviran Granada	98–101	FC Barcelona	Granada
19:30	Scoring by quarter: 16–20, 19–22, 33–26, 30–33
	Pts: Pérez 26; Rebs: Božić 10; Asts: Božić 5 PIR: Božić 35	Boxscore	Pts: Punter 19; Rebs: three players 5 Asts: Núñez 4 PIR: Hernangómez 24	Arena: Palacio de Deportes; Attendance: 6,957; Referees: Jordi Aliaga, Javier Torres, Cristóbal Sánchez

17 May 2026 32	La Laguna Tenerife	97–102	FC Barcelona	San Cristóbal de la Laguna
20:00	Scoring by quarter: 16–29, 27–29, 28–17, 26–27
	Pts: Huertas 20; Rebs: Abromaitis 5 Asts: Fitipaldo 7 PIR: Fitipaldo 22	Boxscore	Pts: Marcos 18; Rebs: Fall 7 Asts: six players 2 PIR: Marcos 27	Arena: Santiago Martín; Attendance: 5,079; Referees: Antonio Conde, Alfonso Olivares, Fabio Fernández

29 May 2026 34	MoraBanc Andorra	95–100(OT)	FC Barcelona	Andorra la Vella
20:30	Scoring by quarter: 15–19, 24–22, 23–20, 24–25, Overtime: 9–14
	Pts: Evans 16; Rebs: Evans 8 Asts: Evans 6 PIR: Evans 26	Boxscore	Pts: Punter 26; Rebs: Shengelia 7 Asts: Punter 4 PIR: Punter 29	Arena: Poliesportiu d'Andorra; Attendance: 4,602; Referees: Carlos Cortés, Luis Miguel Castillo, Cristóbal Sánchez

31 May 2026 33	FC Barcelona	77–102	Valencia Basket	Barcelona
19:00	Scoring by quarter: 14–28, 13–18, 26–29, 24–27
	Pts: Shengelia 17; Rebs: Shengelia 6 Asts: Satoranský 4 PIR: Shengelia 20	Boxscore	Pts: Montero 19; Rebs: Pradilla 11; Asts: three players 4 PIR: Pradilla 24	Arena: Palau Blaugrana; Attendance: 4,703; Referees: Emilio Pérez Pizarro, Sergio Manuel, Vicente Martínez

=== ACB Playoffs ===
==== Quarterfinals ====
2 June 2026 1	UCAM Murcia	68–91	FC Barcelona	Murcia
19:00	Scoring by quarter: 14–16, 16–30, 22–20, 16–25
	Pts: Martin 12; Rebs: Radebaugh 8 Asts: Radebaugh 4 PIR: Radebaugh 17	Boxscore	Pts: Brizuela 18; Rebs: Cale 7 Asts: Brizuela 5 PIR: Brizuela, Veselý 17	Arena: Palacio de Deportes; Attendance: 5,824; Referees: Antonio Conde, Arnau Padrós, Javier Torres

4 June 2026 2	FC Barcelona	87–90	UCAM Murcia	Barcelona
19:00	Scoring by quarter: 18–22, 22–21, 26–24, 21–23
	Pts: Shengelia 18; Rebs: Shengelia 7 Asts: Satoranský 4 PIR: Shengelia 22	Boxscore	Pts: DeJulius 22; Rebs: Raieste 8 Asts: DeJulius 5 PIR: DeJulius 26	Arena: Palau Blaugrana; Attendance: 4,982; Referees: Fernando Calatrava, Rafael Serrano, Alberto Baena

6 June 2026 3	UCAM Murcia	76–100	FC Barcelona	Murcia
21:00	Scoring by quarter: 17–27, 19–25, 25–27, 15–21
	Pts: Forrest 20; Rebs: Cacok 5 Asts: Radebaugh 5 PIR: Radebaugh 20	Boxscore	Pts: Clyburn 23; Rebs: Fall 7 Asts: Shengelia 4 PIR: Clyburn 28	Arena: Palacio de Deportes; Attendance: 7,114; Referees: Emilio Pérez Pizarro, Óscar Perea, Alberto Sánchez Sixto

==== Semifinals ====
9 June 2026 1	FC Barcelona	100–67	La Laguna Tenerife	Barcelona
20:00	Scoring by quarter: 19–11, 27–16, 26–21, 28–19
	Pts: Brizuela 18; Rebs: Shengelia 7 Asts: Laprovíttola 6 PIR: Shengelia 24	Boxscore	Pts: Yebo 16; Rebs: Yebo 6 Asts: Mills 5 PIR: Yebo 12	Arena: Palau Blaugrana; Attendance: 4,571; Referees: Carlos Peruga, Rafael Serrano, Javier Torres

11 June 2026 2	FC Barcelona	97–89	La Laguna Tenerife	Barcelona
20:00	Scoring by quarter: 25–27, 23–11, 21–25, 28–26
	Pts: Veselý 19; Rebs: Fall, Shengelia 6 Asts: Brizuela, Satoranský 3 PIR: Veselý 23	Boxscore	Pts: Mills 36; Rebs: Guerra 6 Asts: Huertas 8 PIR: Mills 37	Arena: Palau Blaugrana; Attendance: 5,985; Referees: Carlos Cortés, Jorge Martínez, Sergio Manuel

13 June 2026 3	La Laguna Tenerife	76–85	FC Barcelona	San Cristóbal de La Laguna
20:00	Scoring by quarter: 19–19, 23–15, 16–22, 18–29
	Pts: Huertas 17; Rebs: Yebo 6 Asts: Huertas 6 PIR: Huertas 18	Boxscore	Pts: Clyburn 19; Rebs: Clyburn 7 Asts: Laprovíttola, Satoranský 3 PIR: Clyburn 21	Arena: Santiago Martín; Attendance: 5,100; Referees: Antonio Conde, Luis Miguel Castillo, Alberto Sánchez Sixto

==== Finals ====
18 June 2026 1	Valencia Basket	112–113(OT)	FC Barcelona	Valencia
20:00	Scoring by quarter: 25–13, 27–34, 20–28, 29–26, Overtime: 11–12
	Pts: Montero 24; Rebs: Pradilla 7 Asts: Montero 7 PIR: Montero 29	Boxscore	Pts: Clyburn 21; Rebs: Veselý 6 Asts: Laprovittola 7 PIR: Laprovíttola 25	Arena: Roig Arena; Attendance: 14,423; Referees: Rafael Conde, Martín Caballero, Luis Miguel Castillo

20 June 2026 2	Valencia Basket	102–75	FC Barcelona	Valencia
20:00	Scoring by quarter: 26–11, 19–27, 29–14, 28–23
	Pts: Montero 19; Rebs: Pradilla 7 Asts: Montero 6 PIR: Montero 27	Boxscore	Pts: Parra 16; Rebs: Cale, Hernangómez 6 Asts: Brizuela 5 PIR: Laprovittola 15	Arena: Roig Arena; Attendance: 14,865; Referees: Emilio Pérez Pizarro, Fernando Calatrava, Arnau Padrós

22 June 2026 3	FC Barcelona	80–88	Valencia Basket	Barcelona
20:00	Scoring by quarter: 17–15, 19–25, 21–31, 23–17
	Pts: Shengelia 25; Rebs: Clyburn, Shengelia 6 Asts: three players 3 PIR: Shengelia 30	Boxscore	Pts: Montero 29; Rebs: Key 8 Asts: Montero 6 PIR: Montero 37	Arena: Palau Blaugrana; Attendance: 7,190; Referees: Carlos Peruga, Óscar Perea, Rafael Serrano

24 June 2026 4	FC Barcelona	84–108	Valencia Basket	Barcelona
20:00	Scoring by quarter: 23–26, 12–21, 29–35, 20–26
	Pts: Punter 26; Rebs: Veselý 8 Asts: Shengelia 5 PIR: Punter 27	Boxscore	Pts: Montero 23; Rebs: Key, Pradilla 6 Asts: three players 3 PIR: Montero 28	Arena: Palau Blaugrana; Attendance: 7,410; Referees: Antonio Conde, Martín Caballero, Alfonso Olivares

=== EuroLeague ===
==== League table ====
Pos	Team	Pld	W	L	PF	PA	PD	Qualification
7	(Hellenic Basketball Federation) Panathinaikos AKTOR	38	22	16	3314	3228	+86	Qualification to play-in
8	(French Federation of Basketball) Monaco	38	22	16	3417	3282	+135	Qualification to play-in
9	(Spanish Basketball Federation) Barcelona	38	21	17	3167	3147	+20	Qualification to play-in
10	(Basketball Federation of Serbia) Crvena zvezda Meridianbet	38	21	17	3287	3245	+42	Qualification to play-in
11	(United Arab Emirates Basketball Association) Dubai Basketball	38	19	19	3324	3325	−1	

Source: EuroLeague
Rules for classification: Regular season tiebreakers

==== Results summary ====
Overall						Home					Away				
Pld	W	L	PF	PA	PD	W	L	PF	PA	PD	W	L	PF	PA	PD
38	21	17	3167	3147	+20	12	7	1618	1591	+27	9	10	1549	1556	−7

Last updated: 17 April 2026.
Source: Competitive matches

==== Results by round ====
Round	1	2	3	4	5	6	7	8	9	10	11	12	13	14	15	16	17	18	19	20	21	22	23	24	25	26	27	28	29	30	31	32	33	34	35	36	37	38
Ground	A	A	H	A	A	H	H	A	H	A	H	A	H	A	H	A	H	A	H	H	H	A	H	A	A	H	A	H	A	A	H	A	H	H	A	H	A	H
Result	L	W	W	W	L	L	W	W	L	W	W	L	W	W	W	W	W	L	L	W	W	L	W	W	L	L	W	L	L	L	L	W	W	W	L	L	L	W
Position	19	14	9	3	6	11	9	8	9	8	6	9	9	6	3	3	2	4	6	5	4	6	6	4	6	8	4	5	8	8	10	10	10	8	8	10	10	9

Source: Competitive matches
A = Away; H = Home; W = Win; L = Loss; P = Postponed

==== Matches ====
30 September 2025 1	Hapoel IBI Tel Aviv (Israeli Basketball Association)	103–87	(Spanish Basketball Federation) FC Barcelona	Sofia (Note: During the 2025–26 EuroLeague season, Hapoel IBI Tel Aviv played their home matches in Bulgaria (Sofia and Botevgrad) due to the inability to host matches in Israel as a result of the Gaza war until further notice.)
18:00	Scoring by quarter: 26–26, 25–19, 31–25, 21–17
	Pts: Blakeney 20; Rebs: three players 4 Asts: Bryant 8 PIR: Blakeney 22	Boxscore	Pts: Clyburn 23; Rebs: Clyburn, Shengelia 7 Asts: Satoranský 4 PIR: Clyburn 30	Arena: Arena Sofia; Attendance: 8,000; Referees: Saša Pukl, Tomislav Hordov, Thomas Bissuel

3 October 2025 2	Panathinaikos AKTOR (Hellenic Basketball Federation)	96–103	(Spanish Basketball Federation) FC Barcelona	Marousi
20:15	Scoring by quarter: 17–26, 28–25, 24–24, 27–28
	Pts: Hernangómez 27; Rebs: Hernangómez, Mitoglou 8 Asts: Sloukas 11; PIR: Hernangómez 39	Boxscore	Pts: Clyburn 23; Rebs: Clyburn, Hernangómez 6 Asts: Laprovíttola 9 PIR: Clyburn 26	Arena: OAKA Altion; Attendance: 18,492; Referees: Robert Lottermoser, Milivoje Jovčić, Sašo Petek

10 October 2025 3	FC Barcelona (Spanish Basketball Federation)	108–102	(Spanish Basketball Federation) Valencia Basket	Barcelona
20:30	Scoring by quarter: 26–25, 22–24, 30–26, 30–27
	Pts: Punter 27; Rebs: Hernangómez 6 Asts: Punter, Satoranský 7 PIR: Punter 31	Boxscore	Pts: Moore 21; Rebs: Costello, Moore 4 Asts: de Larrea 8 PIR: Moore 27	Arena: Palau Blaugrana; Attendance: 5,363; Referees: Borys Ryzhyk, Oļegs Latiševs, Mario Majkić

14 October 2025 4	Maccabi Rapyd Tel Aviv (Israeli Basketball Association)	71–92	(Spanish Basketball Federation) FC Barcelona	Belgrade (Note: Since 24 October 2023, Maccabi Playtika Tel Aviv play their home matches in Belgrade due to the inability to host matches in Israel as a result of the Gaza war until further notice.)
19:00	Scoring by quarter: 18–31, 14–29, 16–13, 23–19
	Pts: Santos 18; Rebs: Leaf 8 Asts: Clark 5 PIR: Santos 19	Boxscore	Pts: Hernangómez 19; Rebs: Hernangómez, Shengelia 7 Asts: Shengelia 8 PIR: Hernangómez 27	Arena: Aleksandar Nikolić Hall; Attendance: 400; Referees: Tomislav Hordov, Luka Kardum, Steve Bittner

16 October 2025 5	Dubai Basketball (United Arab Emirates Basketball Association)	83–78	(Spanish Basketball Federation) FC Barcelona	Dubai
18:00	Scoring by quarter: 24–15, 9–19, 25–22, 25–22
	Pts: Petrušev 23; Rebs: Kabengele 13; Asts: Wright 6 PIR: Petrušev 28	Boxscore	Pts: Brizuela, Shengelia 19; Rebs: Parra 8 Asts: Marcos 5 PIR: Shengelia 16	Arena: Coca-Cola Arena; Attendance: 6,309; Referees: Ilija Belošević, Uroš Nikolić, Michele Rossi

23 October 2025 6	FC Barcelona (Spanish Basketball Federation)	73–88	(Lithuanian Basketball Federation) Žalgiris Kaunas	Barcelona
20:30	Scoring by quarter: 14–26, 25–26, 15–23, 19–13
	Pts: Parra 17; Rebs: Veselý 7 Asts: Shengelia 3 PIR: Parra 20	Boxscore	Pts: Lô 20; Rebs: Wright 7 Asts: Lô 5 PIR: Lô 21	Arena: Palau Blaugrana; Attendance: 4,125; Referees: Sreten Radović, Jakub Zamojski, Maxime Boubert

28 October 2025 7	FC Barcelona (Spanish Basketball Federation)	74–72	(Italian Basketball Federation) EA7 Emporio Armani Milan	Barcelona
20:30	Scoring by quarter: 14–19, 22–22, 28–20, 10–11
	Pts: Clyburn 17; Rebs: three players 5 Asts: Satoranský 7 PIR: Clyburn, Satoranský 16	Boxscore	Pts: Brooks 15; Rebs: Ricci 5 Asts: Bolmaro 4 PIR: Brooks 16	Arena: Palau Blaugrana; Attendance: 5,561; Referees: Mehdi Difallah, Borys Ryzhyk, Thomas Bissuel

31 October 2025 8	Partizan Mozzart Bet (Basketball Federation of Serbia)	76–78	(Spanish Basketball Federation) FC Barcelona	Belgrade
20:30	Scoring by quarter: 17–18, 24–15, 15–25, 20–20
	Pts: Washington 21; Rebs: Jones 13; Asts: Jones 7 PIR: Jones 29	Boxscore	Pts: Shengelia 24; Rebs: Satoranský, Shengelia 5 Asts: Shengelia 5 PIR: Shengelia 42	Arena: Belgrade Arena; Attendance: 20,003; Referees: Emin Moğulkoç, Seffi Shemmesh, Adar Peer

7 November 2025 9	FC Barcelona (Spanish Basketball Federation)	92–101	(Spanish Basketball Federation) Real Madrid	Barcelona
20:30	Scoring by quarter: 24–34, 24–24, 21–27, 23–16
	Pts: Clyburn 18; Rebs: Shengelia 6 Asts: Shengelia 7 PIR: Clyburn 23	Boxscore	Pts: Lyles 29; Rebs: Tavares 10; Asts: Campazzo, Maledon 5 PIR: Lyles 32	Arena: Palau Blaugrana; Attendance: 7,294; Referees: Sreten Radović, Artūras Šukys, Kristaps Konstantinovs

12 November 2025 10	FC Bayern Munich (German Basketball Federation)	74–75	(Spanish Basketball Federation) FC Barcelona	Munich
20:30	Scoring by quarter: 15–20, 17–23, 25–18, 17–14
	Pts: da Silva, Dinwiddie 17; Rebs: da Silva 9 Asts: three players 3 PIR: da Silva 25	Boxscore	Pts: Satoranský 13; Rebs: Shengelia 5 Asts: Satoranský, Shengelia 4 PIR: Satoranský 22	Arena: SAP Garden; Attendance: 11,500; Referees: Oļegs Latiševs, Luka Kardum, Kerem Baki

14 November 2025 11	FC Barcelona (Spanish Basketball Federation)	88–81	(Italian Basketball Federation) Virtus Bologna	Barcelona
20:30	Scoring by quarter: 20–19, 25–24, 16–24, 27–14
	Pts: Punter 17; Rebs: Shengelia 7 Asts: Satoranský 6 PIR: Veselý 16	Boxscore	Pts: Morgan 17; Rebs: three players 6 Asts: Pajola 5 PIR: Morgan 15	Arena: Palau Blaugrana; Attendance: 5,264; Referees: Borys Ryzhyk, Sérgio Silva, Amit Balak

20 November 2025 12	Anadolu Efes (Turkish Basketball Federation)	74–73	(Spanish Basketball Federation) FC Barcelona	Istanbul
18:30	Scoring by quarter: 18–19, 17–27, 23–9, 16–18
	Pts: Cordinier 14; Rebs: Osmani, Weiler-Babb 6 Asts: Weiler-Babb 8 PIR: Osmani, Weiler-Babb 19	Boxscore	Pts: Veselý 16; Rebs: Veselý 8 Asts: Satoranský 5 PIR: Veselý 23	Arena: Basketball Development Center; Attendance: 9,814; Referees: Ilija Belošević, Saulius Račys, Vassilis Pitsilkas

26 November 2025 13	FC Barcelona (Spanish Basketball Federation)	88–78	(French Federation of Basketball) LDLC ASVEL	Barcelona
20:30	Scoring by quarter: 20–19, 25–25, 23–21, 20–13
	Pts: Punter 24; Rebs: Hernangómez, Shengelia 6 Asts: Punter 7 PIR: Punter 33	Boxscore	Pts: de Colo 22; Rebs: Massa 9 Asts: de Colo 9 PIR: de Colo 34	Arena: Palau Blaugrana; Attendance: 5,418; Referees: Tomislav Hordov, Ioannis Foufis, Franko Gracin

5 December 2025 14	Crvena zvezda Meridianbet (Basketball Federation of Serbia)	79–89	(Spanish Basketball Federation) FC Barcelona	Belgrade
20:00	Scoring by quarter: 17–21, 22–25, 18–17, 22–26
	Pts: Miller-McIntyre 19; Rebs: Moneke 9 Asts: Butler, Miller-McIntyre 5 PIR: Moneke 19	Boxscore	Pts: Clyburn 22; Rebs: Veselý 7 Asts: Punter 6 PIR: Clyburn 24	Arena: Belgrade Arena; Attendance: 20,610; Referees: Emin Moğulkoç, Marcin Kowalski, Guido Giovannetti

12 December 2025 15	FC Barcelona (Spanish Basketball Federation)	98–85	(Hellenic Basketball Federation) Olympiacos Piraeus	Barcelona
20:30	Scoring by quarter: 21–22, 21–17, 30–17, 26–29
	Pts: Clyburn 28; Rebs: three players 6 Asts: Satoranský, Veselý 4 PIR: Clyburn 33	Boxscore	Pts: Vezenkov 22; Rebs: Hall 8 Asts: Walkup 10; PIR: Vezenkov 25	Arena: Palau Blaugrana; Attendance: 5,572; Referees: Sreten Radović, Saulius Račys, Maxime Boubert

16 December 2025 16	Paris Basketball (French Federation of Basketball)	69–85	(Spanish Basketball Federation) FC Barcelona	Paris
20:45	Scoring by quarter: 13–30, 16–22, 23–16, 17–17
	Pts: Hifi 16; Rebs: Dokossi 9 Asts: Robinson 5 PIR: Dokossi 24	Boxscore	Pts: Punter 21; Rebs: Clyburn 12; Asts: Satoranský 5 PIR: Clyburn 33	Arena: Adidas Arena; Attendance: 7,933; Referees: Damir Javor, Gytis Vilius, Hüseyin Çelik

19 December 2025 17	FC Barcelona (Spanish Basketball Federation)	134–124(OT)	(Spanish Basketball Federation) Baskonia	Barcelona
20:30	Scoring by quarter: 17–26, 30–27, 23–22, 27–22, Overtime: 9–9, 16–16, 12–2
	Pts: Punter 43; Rebs: Hernangómez, Satoranský 8 Asts: Satoranský 6 PIR: Punter 40	Boxscore	Pts: Howard 33; Rebs: Frisch 9 Asts: Forrest 8 PIR: Howard 35	Arena: Palau Blaugrana; Attendance: 5,462; Referees: Robert Lottermoser, Milan Nedović, Manuel Attard

23 December 2025 18	Fenerbahçe Beko (Turkish Basketball Federation)	72–71	(Spanish Basketball Federation) FC Barcelona	Istanbul
18:45	Scoring by quarter: 17–13, 18–20, 18–19, 19–19
	Pts: Biberović, Horton-Tucker 16; Rebs: Melli 10; Asts: Hall 4 PIR: Melli 16	Boxscore	Pts: Punter 20; Rebs: Hernangómez 9 Asts: Laprovíttola 6 PIR: Brizuela 18	Arena: Ülker Sports Arena; Attendance: 9,796; Referees: Tomislav Hordov, Ioannis Foufis, Luka Kardum

30 December 2025 19	FC Barcelona (Spanish Basketball Federation)	74–90	(French Federation of Basketball) AS Monaco	Barcelona
20:30	Scoring by quarter: 13–22, 17–25, 23–22, 21–21
	Pts: Brizuela 25; Rebs: Fall 6 Asts: Punter, Satoranský 4 PIR: Brizuela 21	Boxscore	Pts: James 19; Rebs: Blossomgame, Hayes 5 Asts: James, Okobo 5 PIR: Hayes 24	Arena: Palau Blaugrana; Attendance: 7,212; Referees: Saša Pukl, Piotr Pastusiak, Vasiliki Tsaroucha

6 January 2026 20	FC Barcelona (Spanish Basketball Federation)	93–83	(Israeli Basketball Association) Maccabi Rapyd Tel Aviv	Barcelona
20:30	Scoring by quarter: 32–19, 24–25, 21–19, 16–20
	Pts: Shengelia 22; Rebs: Hernangómez 10; Asts: Satoranský 6 PIR: Shengelia 27	Boxscore	Pts: Blatt 17; Rebs: Hoard 5 Asts: Blatt 9 PIR: Blatt 26	Arena: Palau Blaugrana; Attendance: 0 (Note: The game was played behind closed doors due to security concerns, after the Mossos d'Esquadra classified it as a high risk game.); Referees: Milan Nedović, Jakub Zamojski, Stefan Ćalić

9 January 2026 21	FC Barcelona (Spanish Basketball Federation)	88–70	(Basketball Federation of Serbia) Partizan Mozzart Bet	Barcelona
20:30	Scoring by quarter: 13–20, 28–15, 21–15, 26–20
	Pts: Hernangómez 16; Rebs: Hernangómez 8 Asts: Laprovíttola 8 PIR: Hernangómez 22	Boxscore	Pts: Washington 20; Rebs: three players 7 Asts: Washington 5 PIR: Washington 19	Arena: Palau Blaugrana; Attendance: 5,574; Referees: Mehdi Difallah, Borys Ryzhyk, Hugues Thépénier

16 January 2026 22	Real Madrid (Spanish Basketball Federation)	80–61	(Spanish Basketball Federation) FC Barcelona	Madrid
20:45	Scoring by quarter: 21–14, 22–17, 20–16, 17–14
	Pts: Garuba 16; Rebs: Okeke 8 Asts: Campazzo 5 PIR: Tavares 20	Boxscore	Pts: Brizuela 13; Rebs: Parra 7 Asts: Laprovíttola, Shengelia 3 PIR: Shengelia 12	Arena: Movistar Arena; Attendance: 12,156; Referees: Damir Javor, Tomislav Hordov, Gytis Vilius

20 January 2026 23	FC Barcelona (Spanish Basketball Federation)	91–89	(United Arab Emirates Basketball Association) Dubai Basketball	Barcelona
20:30	Scoring by quarter: 18–22, 31–19, 30–26, 12–22
	Pts: Brizuela 25; Rebs: Parra 6 Asts: Satoranský 5 PIR: Punter 26	Boxscore	Pts: Wright 29; Rebs: Kabengele 4 Asts: Bacon, Wright 5 PIR: Wright 30	Arena: Palau Blaugrana; Attendance: 5,251; Referees: Saša Pukl, Seffi Shemmesh, Maxime Boubert

23 January 2026 24	LDLC ASVEL (French Federation of Basketball)	91–98	(Spanish Basketball Federation) FC Barcelona	Villeurbanne
20:45	Scoring by quarter: 26–22, 23–25, 21–27, 21–24
	Pts: Watson 23; Rebs: Ndiaye 6 Asts: Angola 5 PIR: Angola 27	Boxscore	Pts: Punter 31; Rebs: Shengelia 5 Asts: Satoranský 5 PIR: Punter 34	Arena: Astroballe; Attendance: 5,560; Referees: Artūras Šukys, Saulius Račys, Manuel Attard

29 January 2026 25	Olympiacos Piraeus (Hellenic Basketball Federation)	87–75	(Spanish Basketball Federation) FC Barcelona	Piraeus
20:15	Scoring by quarter: 27–13, 19–24, 13–27, 28–11
	Pts: Vezenkov 20; Rebs: Vezenkov 11; Asts: Ward 5 PIR: Jones 29	Boxscore	Pts: Punter 15; Rebs: Shengelia 8 Asts: Satoranský 5 PIR: Clyburn 15	Arena: Peace and Friendship Stadium; Attendance: 12,737; Referees: Sreten Radović, Piotr Pastusiak, Kristaps Konstantinovs

3 February 2026 26	FC Barcelona (Spanish Basketball Federation)	78–82	(Turkish Basketball Federation) Fenerbahçe Beko	Barcelona
20:30	Scoring by quarter: 14–29, 27–24, 15–20, 22–9
	Pts: Punter 24; Rebs: Veselý 7 Asts: Satoranský 7 PIR: Punter 23	Boxscore	Pts: Biberović 19; Rebs: Birch 8 Asts: Baldwin 7 PIR: Baldwin 26	Arena: Palau Blaugrana; Attendance: 6,397; Referees: Robert Lottermoser, Luka Kardum, Uroš Obrknežević

6 February 2026 27	Baskonia (Spanish Basketball Federation)	91–97	(Spanish Basketball Federation) FC Barcelona	Vitoria-Gasteiz
20:30	Scoring by quarter: 27–17, 24–31, 17–28, 23–21
	Pts: Diakite 16; Rebs: Diakite 5 Asts: Luwawu-Cabarrot 5 PIR: Diakite 21	Boxscore	Pts: Parra, Shengelia 16; Rebs: Parra, Veselý 6 Asts: three players 4 PIR: Parra 25	Arena: Buesa Arena; Attendance: 10,066; Referees: Mehdi Difallah, Oļegs Latiševs, Guido Giovannetti

12 February 2026 28	FC Barcelona (Spanish Basketball Federation)	74–85	(French Federation of Basketball) Paris Basketball	Barcelona
20:30	Scoring by quarter: 18–21, 25–18, 12–28, 19–18
	Pts: Brizuela 15; Rebs: Norris 9 Asts: Marcos 5 PIR: Shengelia 19	Boxscore	Pts: Hifi 21; Rebs: Dokossi 9 Asts: three players 3 PIR: Hifi 20	Arena: Palau Blaugrana; Attendance: 4,368; Referees: Tomislav Hordov, Saulius Račys, Ioannis Tiganis

25 February 2026 29	Virtus Bologna (Italian Basketball Federation)	85–80	(Spanish Basketball Federation) FC Barcelona	Bologna
20:30	Scoring by quarter: 20–28, 27–15, 21–14, 17–23
	Pts: Edwards 22; Rebs: Diarra 9 Asts: Vildoza 7 PIR: Smalagić 21	Boxscore	Pts: Punter 27; Rebs: Shengelia 7 Asts: Laprovíttola 12; PIR: Punter 26	Arena: Virtus Arena; Attendance: 8,670; Referees: Emin Moğulkoç, Joseph Bissang, Artūras Šukys

5 March 2026 30	EA7 Emporio Armani Milan (Italian Basketball Federation)	87–84	(Spanish Basketball Federation) FC Barcelona	Milan
20:30	Scoring by quarter: 24–17, 22–17, 32–17, 9–33
	Pts: Leday 16; Rebs: Leday, Nebo 7 Asts: Bolmaro 6 PIR: Bolmaro, Leday 22	Boxscore	Pts: Shengelia, Veselý 15; Rebs: Shengelia 7 Asts: Satoranský 5 PIR: Satoranský 22	Arena: Allianz Cloud; Attendance: 5,362; Referees: Robert Lottermoser, Borys Ryzhyk, Marcin Kowalski

13 March 2026 31	FC Barcelona (Spanish Basketball Federation)	75–80	(Israeli Basketball Association) Hapoel IBI Tel Aviv	Barcelona
20:30	Scoring by quarter: 26–19, 14–27, 21–20, 14–14
	Pts: Punter 17; Rebs: Norris 7 Asts: Satoranský 4 PIR: Punter 17	Boxscore	Pts: Oturu 22; Rebs: Edwards 8 Asts: Micić 7 PIR: Bryant 32	Arena: Palau Blaugrana; Attendance: 0 (Note: The game was played behind closed doors due to security concerns, after the Mossos d'Esquadra classified it as a high risk game.); Referees: Emin Moğulkoç, Artūras Šukys, Robert Vyklický

19 March 2026 32	Valencia Basket (Spanish Basketball Federation)	62–66	(Spanish Basketball Federation) FC Barcelona	Valencia
18:00	Scoring by quarter: 15–18, 18–17, 19–18, 10–13
	Pts: Sako 12; Rebs: Puerto, Sako 5 Asts: Thompson 4 PIR: Sako 14	Boxscore	Pts: Parra 14; Rebs: Parra 9 Asts: Brizuela, Satoranský 4 PIR: Parra 19	Arena: Roig Arena; Attendance: 13,558; Referees: Ilija Belošević, Mehdi Difallah, Sašo Petek

24 March 2026 33	FC Barcelona (Spanish Basketball Federation)	78–71	(Turkish Basketball Federation) Anadolu Efes	Barcelona
20:30	Scoring by quarter: 19–15, 23–15, 15–24, 21–17
	Pts: Clyburn 21; Rebs: Shengelia 8 Asts: Brizuela, Shengelia 3 PIR: Shengelia 25	Boxscore	Pts: Osmani 18; Rebs: Osmani 8 Asts: Dozier, Jones 3 PIR: Osmani 23	Arena: Palau Blaugrana; Attendance: 4,861; Referees: Saša Pukl, Tomislav Hordov, Sérgio Silva

27 March 2026 34	FC Barcelona (Spanish Basketball Federation)	92–88(OT)	(Basketball Federation of Serbia) Crvena zvezda Meridianbet	Barcelona
21:00	Scoring by quarter: 18–20, 24–20, 22–18, 11–17, Overtime: 17–13
	Pts: Clyburn 18; Rebs: Satoranský 8 Asts: Satoranský 6 PIR: Satoranský 24	Boxscore	Pts: Nwora 26; Rebs: Nwora 9 Asts: Miller-McIntyre 7 PIR: Nwora 24	Arena: Palau Blaugrana; Attendance: 4,889; Referees: Ioannis Foufis, Piotr Pastusiak, Saulius Račys

2 April 2026 35	Žalgiris Kaunas (Lithuanian Basketball Federation)	83–71	(Spanish Basketball Federation) FC Barcelona	Kaunas
19:00	Scoring by quarter: 22–21, 17–19, 20–16, 24–15
	Pts: Wright 18; Rebs: Wright 11; Asts: Francisco 8 PIR: Wright 28	Boxscore	Pts: Punter 16; Rebs: Parra, Shengelia 4 Asts: Satoranský 4 PIR: Punter 13	Arena: Žalgirio Arena; Attendance: 15,278; Referees: Damir Javor, Luka Kardum, Eduard Udyanskyy

7 April 2026 36	FC Barcelona (Spanish Basketball Federation)	79–93	(Hellenic Basketball Federation) Panathinaikos AKTOR	Barcelona
20:30	Scoring by quarter: 23–27, 15–28, 11–25, 30–13
	Pts: Parra 18; Rebs: Norris 6 Asts: Marcos 7 PIR: Norris 22	Boxscore	Pts: Osman 21; Rebs: Lessort 7 Asts: Sloukas 5 PIR: Osman 27	Arena: Palau Blaugrana; Attendance: 5,461; Referees: Robert Lottermoser, Oļegs Latiševs, Manuel Attard

10 April 2026 37	AS Monaco (French Federation of Basketball)	93–86	(Spanish Basketball Federation) FC Barcelona	Fontvieille
19:30	Scoring by quarter: 18–26, 28–18, 26–23, 21–19
	Pts: James, Okobo 16; Rebs: Blossomgame 7 Asts: Okobo 8 PIR: Okobo 21	Boxscore	Pts: Punter 27; Rebs: three players 5 Asts: Shengelia 7 PIR: Punter 29	Arena: Salle Gaston Médecin; Attendance: 5,000; Referees: Sreten Radović, Jakub Zamojski, Anne Panther

17 April 2026 38	FC Barcelona (Spanish Basketball Federation)	95–69	(German Basketball Federation) FC Bayern Munich	Barcelona
20:30	Scoring by quarter: 20–19, 22–12, 26–17, 27–21
	Pts: Clyburn 22; Rebs: Fall 12; Asts: Clyburn, Satoranský 5 PIR: Clyburn 33	Boxscore	Pts: Mike 17; Rebs: Lučić 7 Asts: Lučić, Rathan-Mayes 3 PIR: Mike 16	Arena: Palau Blaugrana; Attendance: 5,930; Referees: Ilija Belošević, Miloš Koljenšić, Marcin Kowalski

=== EuroLeague Playoffs ===
==== Play-in ====
21 April 2026 Play-in B	FC Barcelona (Spanish Basketball Federation)	80–72	(Basketball Federation of Serbia) Crvena zvezda Meridianbet	Barcelona
20:45	Scoring by quarter: 29–21, 18–12, 16–18, 17–21
	Pts: Clyburn, Punter 22; Rebs: Clyburn 7 Asts: Satoranský 7 PIR: Clyburn 26	Boxscore	Pts: Miller-McIntyre 19; Rebs: Izundu, Moneke 7 Asts: Miller-McIntyre 3 PIR: Izundu 15	Arena: Palau Blaugrana; Attendance: 5,252; Referees: Robert Lottermoser, Mehdi Difallah, Gytis Vilius

24 April 2026 Play-in C	AS Monaco (French Federation of Basketball)	79–70	(Spanish Basketball Federation) FC Barcelona	Fontvieille
19:30	Scoring by quarter: 26–14, 23–21, 9–18, 21–17
	Pts: Theis 16; Rebs: Blossomgame 10; Asts: James 10; PIR: Blossomgame 23	Boxscore	Pts: Clyburn 16; Rebs: Clyburn, Shengelia 7 Asts: Shengelia, Veselý 3 PIR: Shengelia 19	Arena: Salle Gaston Médecin; Attendance: 4,055; Referees: Saša Pukl, Emin Moğulkoç, Luka Kardum

=== Copa del Rey ===
==== Quarterfinals ====
20 February 2026	FC Barcelona	91–85	UCAM Murcia	Valencia
21:00	Scoring by quarter: 20–19, 22–25, 18–18, 31–23
	Pts: Punter 20; Rebs: Hernangómez 5 Asts: Laprovíttola 9 PIR: Laprovíttola 19	Boxscore	Pts: Ennis 25; Rebs: Cacok 10; Asts: DeJulius, Ennis 4 PIR: Cacok 24	Arena: Roig Arena; Attendance: 15,124; Referees: Antonio Conde, Fernando Calatrava, Alberto Sánchez Sixto

==== Semifinals ====
21 February 2026	FC Barcelona	67–70	Kosner Baskonia	Valencia
21:00	Scoring by quarter: 21–16, 16–22, 21–11, 9–21
	Pts: Laprovíttola, Shengelia 12; Rebs: Shengelia 7 Asts: Laprovíttola 4 PIR: Clyburn 15	Boxscore	Pts: Kurucs 14; Rebs: Luwawu-Cabarrot 7 Asts: Forrest 8 PIR: Forrest 20	Arena: Roig Arena; Attendance: 15,088; Referees: Emilio Pérez Pizarro, Fernando Calatrava, Alfonso Olivares

== Individual awards ==
=== Liga ACB ===
Player of the Round

- (Spain) Joel Parra – Round 9

=== EuroLeague ===
MVP of the Round

- (Georgia (country)) Tornike Shengelia – Round 8
- (United States) Will Clyburn – Round 15
- (United States) Kevin Punter – Round 17, Round 24

MVP of the Month

- (United States) Kevin Punter – December
