= Juani Marcos =

Argentine basketball player (born 2000)

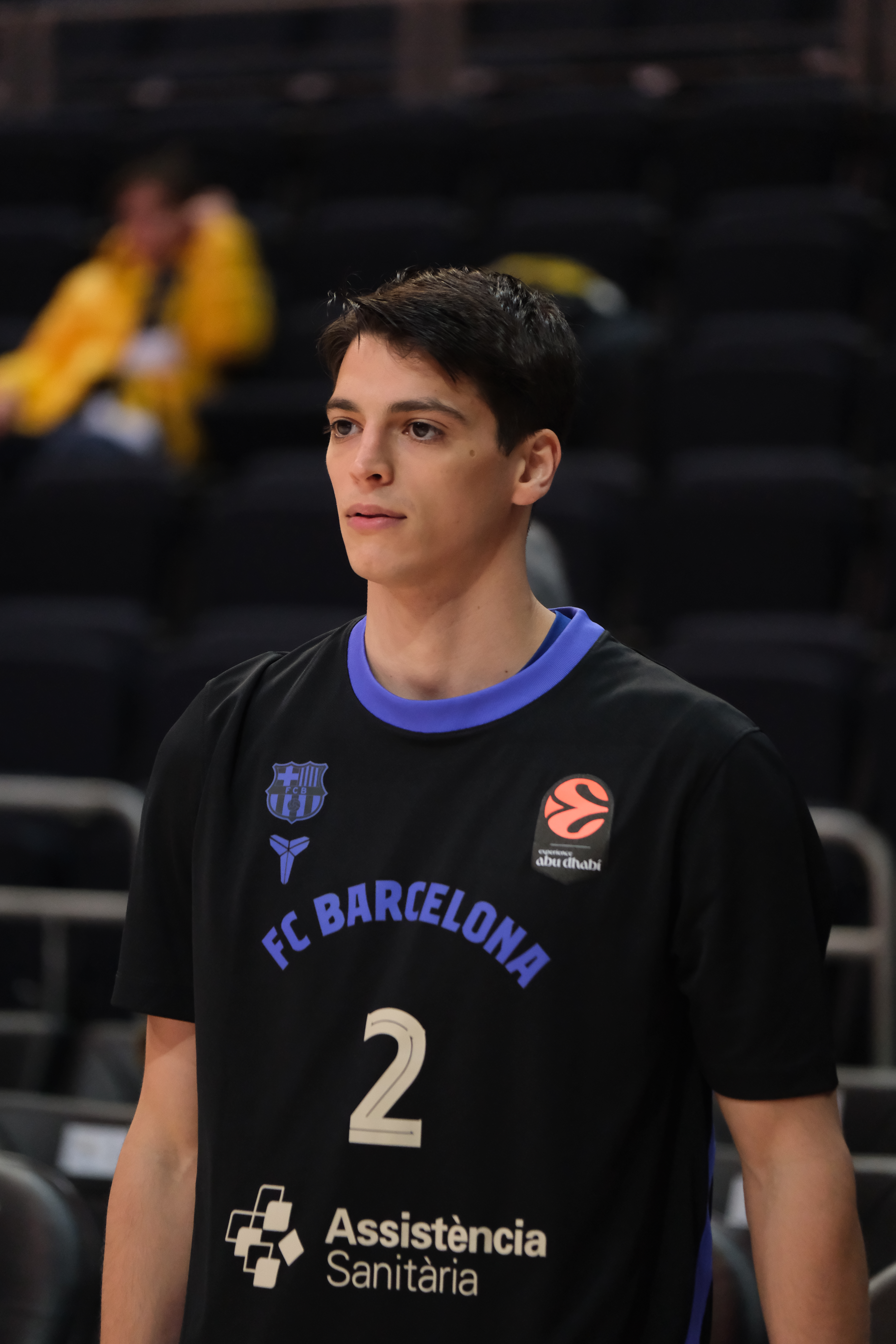
- Marcos with FC Barcelona in 2025

No. 6 – UCAM Murcia
- Position: Point guard
- League: Liga ACB

Personal information
- Born: 10 April 2000 (age 26) Rosario, Argentina
- Listed height: 1.90 m (6 ft 3 in)
- Listed weight: 80 kg (176 lb)

Career information
- NBA draft: 2022: undrafted
- Playing career: 2015–present

Career history
- 2015–2019: Peñarol de Mar del Plata
- 2019–2024: FC Barcelona
- 2019–2021: →FC Barcelona B
- 2021–2023: →Força Lleida
- 2023–2024: →Bàsquet Girona
- 2024–2025: Bàsquet Girona
- 2025–2026: FC Barcelona
- 2026–present: UCAM Murcia
Medals
Men's basketball
Representing Argentina
FIBA AmeriCup
Silver medal – second place	2025 Managua
South American Games
Silver medal – second place	2018 Cochabamba	U18 Team

Juan Ignacio 'Juani' Marcos (born 6 July 2000) is an Argentine professional basketball player for UCAM Murcia of the Liga ACB. Standing at 6 ft 3 inches (1.90 m), Marcos plays as a point guard. Marcos also has Italian citizenship.

== Early life and youth career ==
Born in Rosario, Argentina, Marcos played in the youth ranks of Club El Coatí, a basketball club based in Eldorado, Misiones. Marcos would go on to join Club Atlético Peñarol in Mar del Plata and make his debut in the Liga Nacional de Básquet at age 15.

== Professional career ==
Marcos would remain a Peñarol player until 2019, averaging 6.8 points per game and 2 assists in 33 games in the 2018–19 Liga Nacional de Básquet.

=== FC Barcelona (2019–2024) ===
In July 2019, Marcos signed with FC Barcelona. He would play the two following seasons with the reserve team, FC Barcelona B, in the LEB Plata. Averaging 9 points per game and 3.1 assists in 54 total games, Marcos became a key player in the reserve team's roster.

In September 2021, Marcos joined Força Lleida in the LEB Oro on loan from Barcelona. Becoming an important player in Lleida's rotation in his first season, the club reached an agreement with Barcelona to extend Marcos' loan for a second season.

Marcos would spend a further season on loan after joining Bàsquet Girona of the Liga ACB in the summer of 2023. He made his Liga ACB debut in an away win against Valencia Basket in September 2023. At the end of the 2023–24 season FC Barcelona decided not to extend Marcos' contract, bringing an end to his 5 years with the Catalan club.

=== Bàsquet Girona (2024–2025) ===
In July 2024, Marcos signed with Bàsquet Girona, returning after spending the previous season on loan.

=== FC Barcelona (2025–2026) ===
On 30 June 2025, FC Barcelona announced an agreement had been reached for the return of Marcos. The Argentine signed a two-season deal after Barcelona triggered the buyout clause on his contract with Girona. On 30 June 2026, Barcelona announced the club had reached an agreement with Marcos to terminate the player's contract.

=== UCAM Murcia (2026–present) ===
On 30 June 2026, Marcos signed with UCAM Murcia of the Liga ACB.

== National team career ==
Marcos has represented Argentina's youth ranks in several international tournaments, such as the 2019 U19 World Cup with the U19 Team.

He made his debut for the senior Argentine national team against Chile in February 2024, during the 2025 FIBA AmeriCup qualification. Marcos was a member of Argentina's roster in the 2025 FIBA AmeriCup, in which they were runners-up.

== Career statistics ==
Legend
GP	Games played	GS	Games started	MPG	Minutes per game
FG%	Field-goal percentage	3P%	3-point field-goal percentage	FT%	Free-throw percentage
RPG	Rebounds per game	APG	Assists per game	SPG	Steals per game
BPG	Blocks per game	PPG	Points per game	PIR	Performance index rating
**Bold**	Career high

=== Domestic leagues ===
Year	Team	League	GP	MPG	FG%	3P%	FT%	RPG	APG	SPG	BPG	PPG
2023–24	(Spain) Girona	ACB	22	22.5	.420	.357	.841	3.1	3.5	1.3	.2	9.7
2024–25	(Spain) Girona	ACB	28	21.1	.400	.351	.837	1.9	4.3	.9	.1	8.3
