= Cameron Hunt (basketball) =

American basketball player (born 1997)

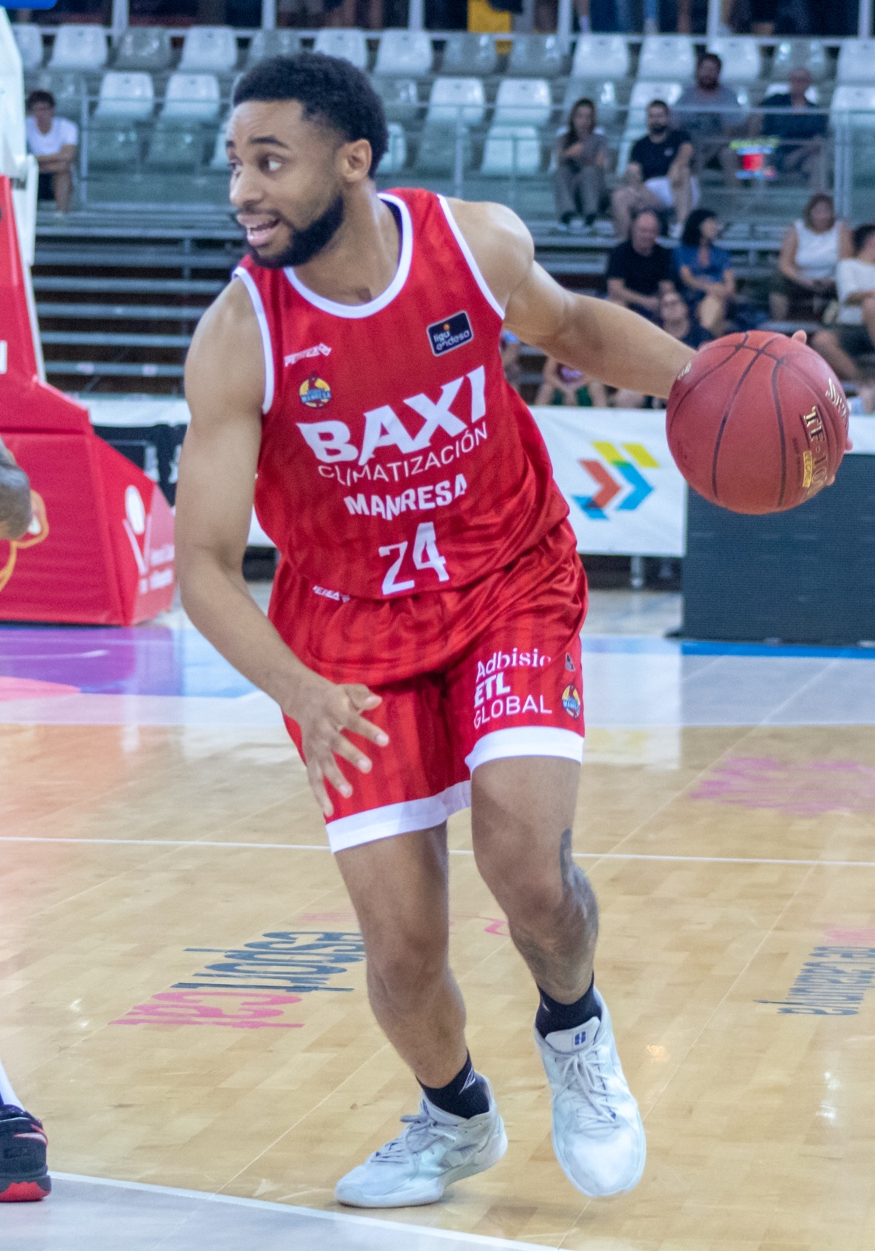
- Hunt with Bàsquet Manresa in 2024

No. 24 – Unicaja Málaga
- Position: Shooting guard
- League: Liga ACB; BCL

Personal information
- Born: August 25, 1997 (age 29) Duncanville, Texas, U.S.
- Listed height: 1.91 m (6 ft 3 in)
- Listed weight: 79 kg (174 lb)

Career information
- High school: Duncanville (Duncanville, Texas)
- College: Southwestern (KS) (2015–2019)
- NBA draft: 2019: undrafted
- Playing career: 2019–present

Career history
- 2019–2020: TG Würzburg
- 2020–2023: Würzburg
- 2023: Derthona Basket
- 2023–2024: JDA Dijon
- 2024–2025: Manresa
- 2025–2026: Joventut Badalona
- 2026–present: Unicaja Málaga

Career highlights
- French Cup winner (2024); NABC NAIA DII Player of the Year (2019); First-team NAIA Division II All-American (2019)

Cameron Lee Hunt (born August 25, 1997) is an American professional basketball player for Unicaja Málaga of the Spanish Liga ACB and the Basketball Champions League (BCL). Standing at 6 ft 3 in (1.91 m), Hunt plays as a shooting guard.

== Early life and youth career ==
Born in Duncanville, Texas, Hunt attended and played basketball for Duncanville High School. He would go on to play college basketball for Southwestern Moundbuilders in the NAIA. Hunt's improving performances over 4 seasons with Southwestern caught media attention in 2019, being regarded as 'the nation’s best basketball player at the NAIA level'. He would be named Player of the Year of the 2018-19 NAIA Division II in March 2019.

== Professional career ==
After finishing his college basketball career, Hunt signed with TG Würzburg, the reserve team of Würzburg Baskets then playing in the ProB, the third tier of German basketball. His good performances earned him a spot in the first team, signing a 3 year contract to play with Würzburg in the Basketball Bundesliga at the start of the 2020–21 season. Hunt played three seasons with Würzburg, averaging 17.1 points per game and 3.3 assists in his last one.

After finishing the 2022–23 regular season with Würzburg, Hunt joined Italian side Derthona Basket to play the 2023 LBA Playoffs.

In June 2023, Hunt signed a one year contract with JDA Dijon of the LNB Élite.

In July 2024, Hunt signed a one year contract with Bàsquet Manresa of the Liga ACB. In April 2025, Hunt was the player of the round for round 28 of the 2024–25 ACB season, after scoring 30 points in a win against Bàsquet Girona.

On July 7, 2025, he signed with Joventut Badalona of the Liga ACB.

On Jun 26, 2026, he signed with Unicaja of the Liga ACB and the Basketball Champions League, after activating the release clause on his contract with Joventut. Hunt signed a two-season contract.

== Career statistics ==
Legend
GP	Games played	GS	Games started	MPG	Minutes per game
FG%	Field-goal percentage	3P%	3-point field-goal percentage	FT%	Free-throw percentage
RPG	Rebounds per game	APG	Assists per game	SPG	Steals per game
BPG	Blocks per game	PPG	Points per game	PIR	Performance index rating
**Bold**	Career high

=== Domestic leagues ===
==== Regular season ====
Year	Team	League	GP	MPG	FG%	3P%	FT%	RPG	APG	SPG	BPG	PPG
2023–24	(France) Dijon	LNB	33	25.4	.488	.374	.830	1.7	2.2	1.2	.4	12.1
2024–25	(Spain) Manresa	ACB	31	24.6	.486	.403	.876	2.0	2.6	1.0	.2	13.7
