= Avinguda de Prat de la Riba, Lleida =

Coordinates: 41°37′16″N 0°37′26″E

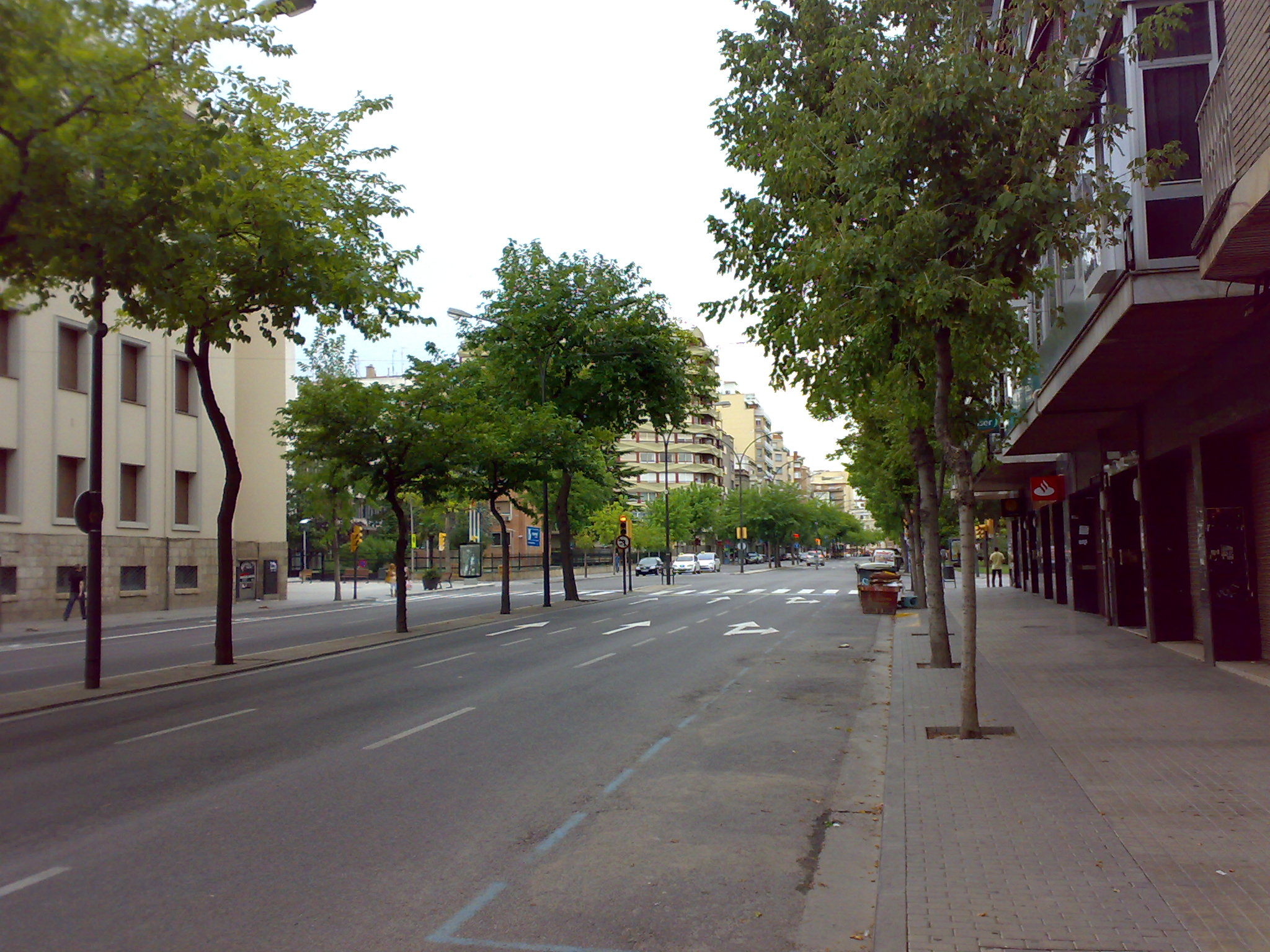
Prat de la Riba Avenue

Avinguda Prat de la Riba, formerly called Avenida del General Mola in Francoist Spain, is one of the main avenues of the city of Lleida. It is 2.5 km in length and 25 meters wide, with 3 lanes in each traffic direction. It is named after the Catalan politician Enric Prat de la Riba, whereas its former namesake was Emilio Mola. When created, it was a merely 805 meters long originating at Plaça de Ricard Viñes and ending by Carrer del Príncep de Viana. Years later, with the expansion of the neighbouring Pardinyes district, the street grew to reach the railway tracks. The latest addition to Prat de la Riba was a bridge and green area covering the now-underground railway tracks.

The Barris Nord Hall, the current home of CE Lleida Bàsquet, is located at the intersection with Rambla de Pardinyes. Other notable buildings are the old Military Government Building at number 36, and Clínica la Aliança at number 73.
