= 2016–17 CERH European League =

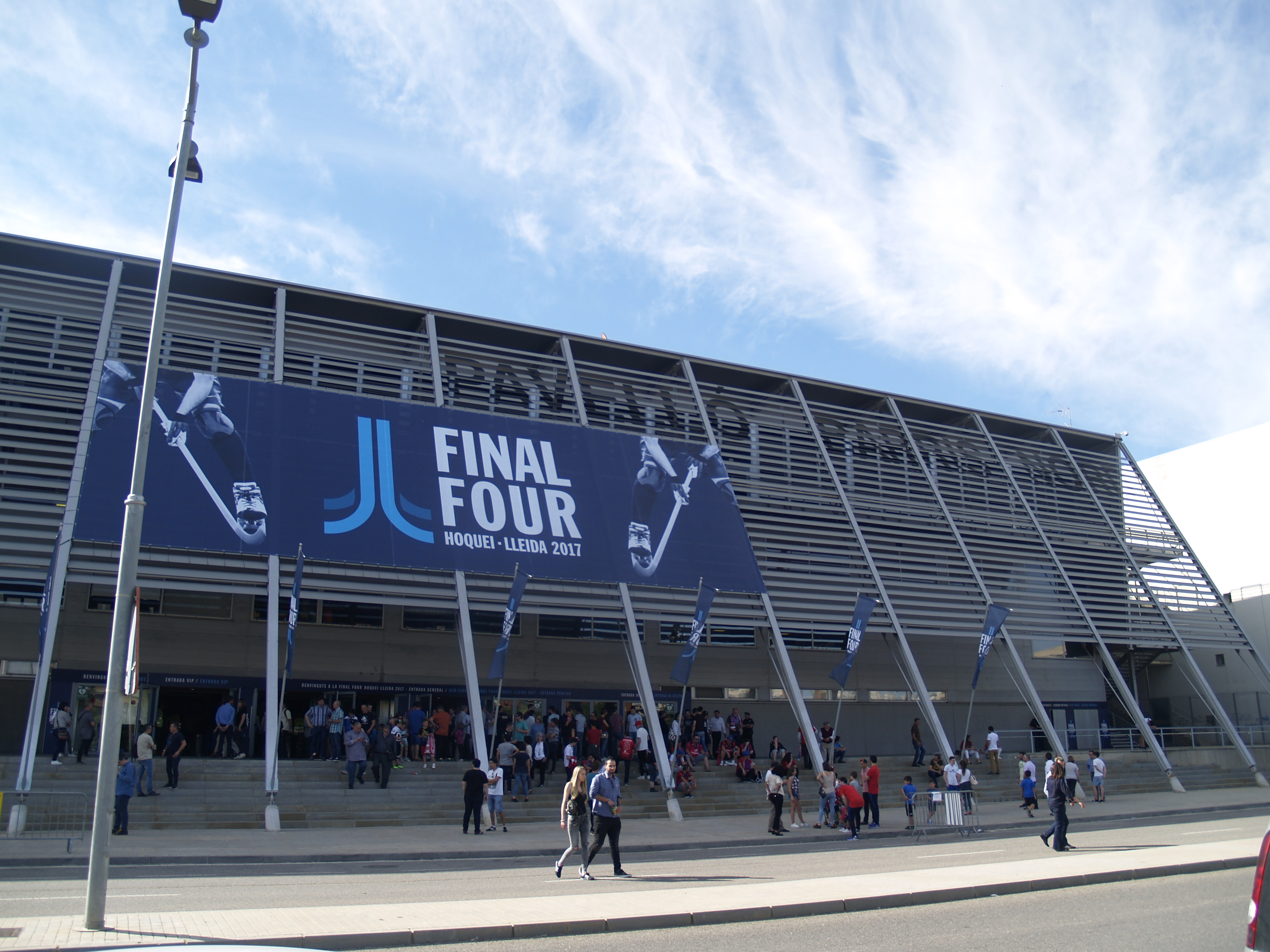
- The Pavelló Barris Nord in Lleida hosted the Final Four.

Tournament details
- Dates: 5 November 2016 – 14 May 2017
- Teams: 16 (from 5 associations)

Final positions
- Champions: (Spain) Reus (8th title)
- Runners-up: (Portugal) Oliveirense

Tournament statistics
- Matches played: 59
- Goals scored: 472 (8 per match)
- Top scorer(s): (Italy) Federico Ambrosio (15 goals)

The 2016–17 CERH European League was the 52nd season of Europe's premier club roller hockey tournament organised by CERH, and the 20th season since it was renamed from European Champion Clubs' Cup to the CERH Champions League/European League.

The winners of the 2016–17 CERH European League earn the right to play against the winners of the 2016–17 CERS Cup in the 2017 CERH Continental Cup.

Benfica were the defending champions.

== Teams ==
League positions of the previous season shown in parentheses (TH: Title holders, LQF: Losing quarter-finalists). Bold means seeded teams.

Group stage
(Spain) **Barcelona** (1st)	(Portugal) **Benfica**^{TH} (1st)	(Italy) **Forte dei Marmi** (1st)	(France) La Vendéenne (1st)
(Spain) Vic (2nd)	(Portugal) Porto (2nd)	(Italy) Amatori Lodi (2nd)	(France) Mérignac (2nd)
(Spain) Liceo (3rd)	(Portugal) Oliveirense (3rd)	(Italy) Breganze (LQF)	(France) Dinan Quévert (3rd)
(Spain) **Reus** (4th)	(Portugal) Sporting CP (4th)	(Italy) Bassano (LQF)	(Switzerland) Diessbach (1st)

- There was a berth for the winner of the National Roller Hockey League (from England), but the champions King's Lynn declined the invitation. The losing quarter-finalists of the Lega Nazionale Hockey, Bassano, were then awarded with the spot.
- There was also a berth for the winner of the Roller Hockey Bundesliga (from Germany), but the champions Iserlohn also declined the invitation. The 3rd place of the Nationale 1 Elite, Dinan Quévert, were then awarded with the spot.

== Round dates ==
The schedule of the competition is as follows (draw held in Mieres, Spain, on 10 September 2016).

Phase	Round	First leg	Second leg
Group stage	Matchday 1	5 November 2016	
Group stage	Matchday 2	26 November 2016	
Group stage	Matchday 3	17 December 2016	
Group stage	Matchday 4	14 January 2017	
Group stage	Matchday 5	4 February 2017	
Group stage	Matchday 6	18 February 2017	
Knockout phase	Quarter-finals	11 March 2017	1 April 2017
Knockout phase	Semi-finals	13 May 2017	
Knockout phase	Final	14 May 2017	

== Group stage ==
Location of teams of the 2016–17 CERH European League group stage.
Red: Group A; Green: Group B; Blue: Group C; Yellow: Group D.

The 16 teams were allocated into four pots, with the title holders, Benfica, being placed in Pot 1 automatically. The other 3 seeded teams, Barcelona, Forte dei Marmi and Liceo, were automatically placed in groups B, C and D, respectively. They were drawn into four groups of four, with the restriction that teams from the same association could not be drawn against each other.

In each group, teams played against each other home-and-away in a home-and-away round-robin format.

A total of 5 national associations were represented in the group stage. Sporting CP made its debut appearance in the group stage.

The group winners and runners-up advanced to the quarter-finals.

=== Group A ===
Pos	Team	Pld	W	D	L	GF	GA	GD	Pts	Qualification	BEN	LOD	VIC	DIE
1	(Portugal) Benfica	6	5	1	0	37	20	+17	16	Advance to knockout phase	—	7–3	3–2	12–2
2	(Italy) Amatori Lodi	6	3	1	2	30	25	+5	10	Advance to knockout phase	6–7	—	6–3	8–3
3	(Spain) Vic	6	2	2	2	30	18	+12	8		4–4	2–2	—	10–1
4	(Switzerland) Diessbach	6	0	0	6	14	48	−34	0		3–4	3–5	2–9	—

Source: CERH

=== Group B ===
Pos	Team	Pld	W	D	L	GF	GA	GD	Pts	Qualification	BAR	POR	BAS	MER
1	(Spain) Barcelona	6	5	0	1	32	11	+21	15	Advance to knockout phase	—	3–1	14–3	5–1
2	(Portugal) Porto	6	4	1	1	27	13	+14	13	Advance to knockout phase	2–1	—	13–3	1–1
3	(Italy) Bassano	6	2	0	4	24	40	−16	6		2–3	3–4	—	6–4
4	(France) Mérignac	6	0	1	5	12	31	−19	1		2–6	2–6	2–7	—

Source: CERH

=== Group C ===
Pos	Team	Pld	W	D	L	GF	GA	GD	Pts	Qualification	REU	FOR	SPO	QUE
1	(Spain) Reus	6	5	0	1	25	18	+7	15	Advance to knockout phase	—	7–5	3–2	5–4
2	(Italy) Forte dei Marmi	6	4	0	2	27	24	+3	12	Advance to knockout phase	2–4	—	3–1	2–1
3	(Portugal) Sporting CP	6	3	0	3	23	19	+4	9		6–3	5–7	—	5–1
4	(France) Dinan Quévert	6	0	0	6	16	27	−11	0		2–3	6–8	2–4	—

Source: CERH

=== Group D ===
Pos	Team	Pld	W	D	L	GF	GA	GD	Pts	Qualification	OLI	LIC	BRE	VEN
1	(Portugal) Oliveirense	6	6	0	0	29	20	+9	18	Advance to knockout phase	—	2–1	5–4	4–2
2	(Spain) Liceo	6	4	0	2	32	20	+12	12	Advance to knockout phase	6–7	—	5–2	8–2
3	(Italy) Breganze	6	0	2	4	23	31	−8	2		3–4	4–7	—	4–4
4	(France) La Vendéenne	6	0	2	4	21	34	−13	2		4–7	3–5	6–6	—

Source: CERH

== Knockout phase ==
The knockout phase comprises a quarter-final round and the final four tournament. In the quarter-finals, group stage winners play against group stage runners-up, the latter hosting the first of two legs. The winners qualify for the final four, which will take place at the ground of one of the four finalists.

=== Quarter-finals ===
The first-leg matches were played on 11 March, and the second-leg matches were played on 1 April 2017.

Team 1	Agg.	Team 2	1st leg	2nd leg
Liceo (Spain)	4–9	(Portugal) Benfica	2–3	2–6
Forte dei Marmi (Italy)	5–6	(Spain) Barcelona	1–3	4–3
Porto (Portugal)	9–9 (0–2 p)	(Spain) Reus	7–7	2–2 (a.e.t.)
Amatori Lodi (Italy)	6–8	(Portugal) Oliveirense	3–5	3–3

=== Final four ===
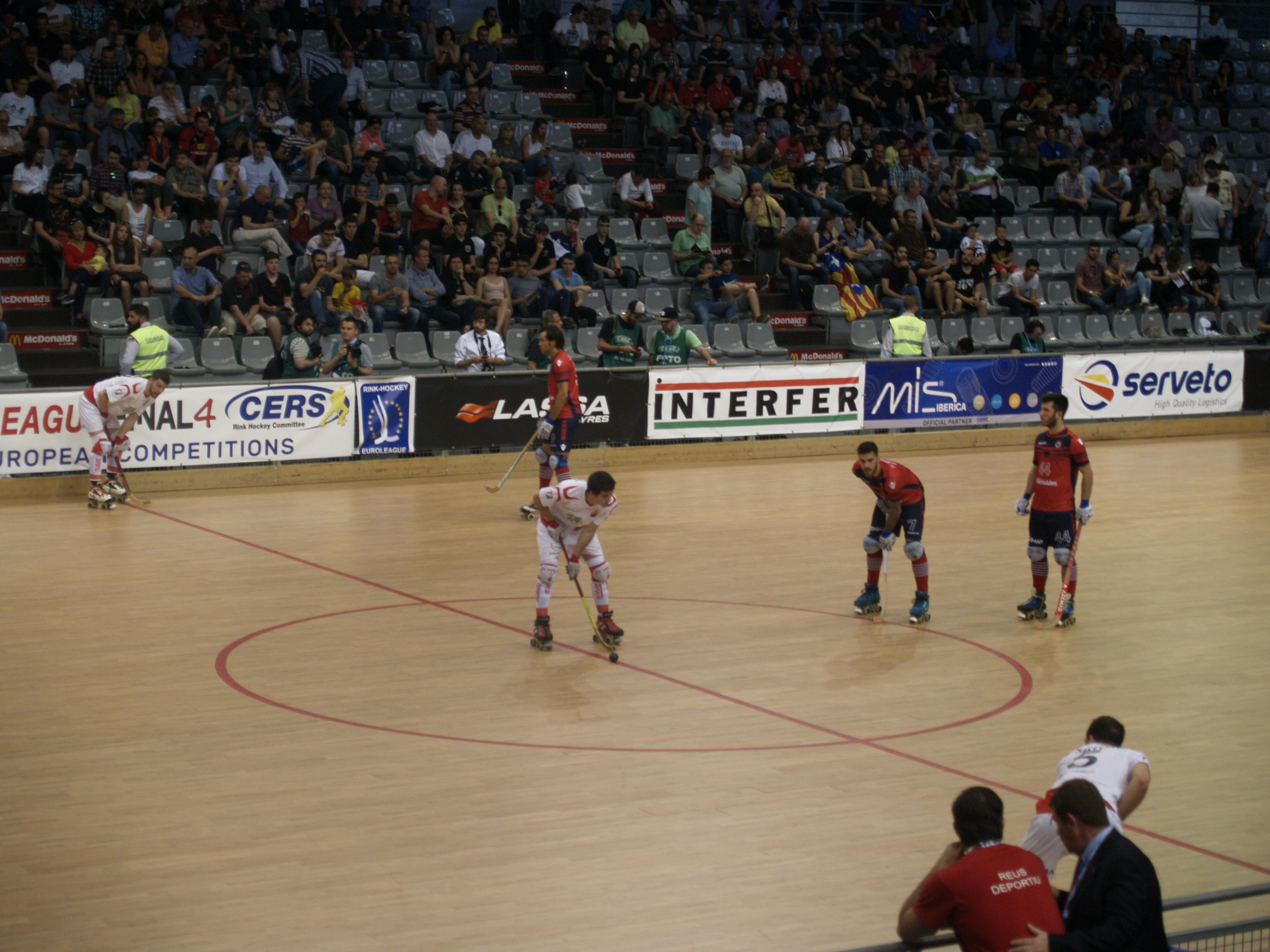
The final was played by Reus Deportiu and Oliveirense.

The final four tournament took place on 13 and 14 May 2017. It was hosted by Barcelona at the Pavelló Barris Nord in Lleida, Spain.

All times listed below are local time (UTC+02:00).

Semi-finals
13 May 2017
(Portugal) Benfica	4 (1)
(Spain) Reus (pen.)	4 (2)
13 May 2017
(Spain) Barcelona	0
(Portugal) Oliveirense (a.e.t.)	1

Final
14 May 2017
(Spain) Reus	4
(Portugal) Oliveirense	1

==== Semi-finals ====
13 May 2017
17:15

Barcelona (Spain)	0–1 (a.e.t.)	(Portugal) Oliveirense
	Report	Ricardo Barreiros 56'

Pavelló Barris Nord, Lleida
Attendance: Alessandro Eccelsi, Filippo Fronte (Italy)
13 May 2017
19:30

Benfica (Portugal)	4–4 (a.e.t.)	(Spain) Reus
Diogo Rafael 3'; João Rodrigues 11'; Carlos Nicolía 36'; Jordi Adroher 40'	Report	Albert Casanovas 1', 22'; Raül Marín 13'; Matías Platero 42'
Penalties
Miguel Rocha (penalty missed); Jordi Adroher (penalty missed); João Rodrigues (penalty missed); Carlos Nicolía (penalty scored); Valter Neves (penalty missed)	1–2	(penalty missed) Raül Marín; (penalty missed) Àlex Rodríguez; (penalty missed) Marc Torra; (penalty scored) Joan Salvat; (penalty scored) Albert Casanovas

Pavelló Barris Nord, Lleida
Referee: Massimiliano Carmazzi, Franco Ferrari (Italy)

==== Final ====
14 May 2017
16:00

Reus (Spain)	4–1	(Portugal) Oliveirense
Raül Marín 2'; Albert Casanovas 33'; Marc Torra 40', 41'	Report	Pablo Cancela 25'

Pavelló Barris Nord, Lleida
Referee: Filippo Fronte, Alessandro Eccelsi (Italy)

== See also ==
- 2016–17 CERS Cup
- 2017 CERH Continental Cup
- 2016–17 CERH Women's European Cup
