= Pavelló Barris Nord =

Coordinates: 41°37′33″N 0°37′53″E

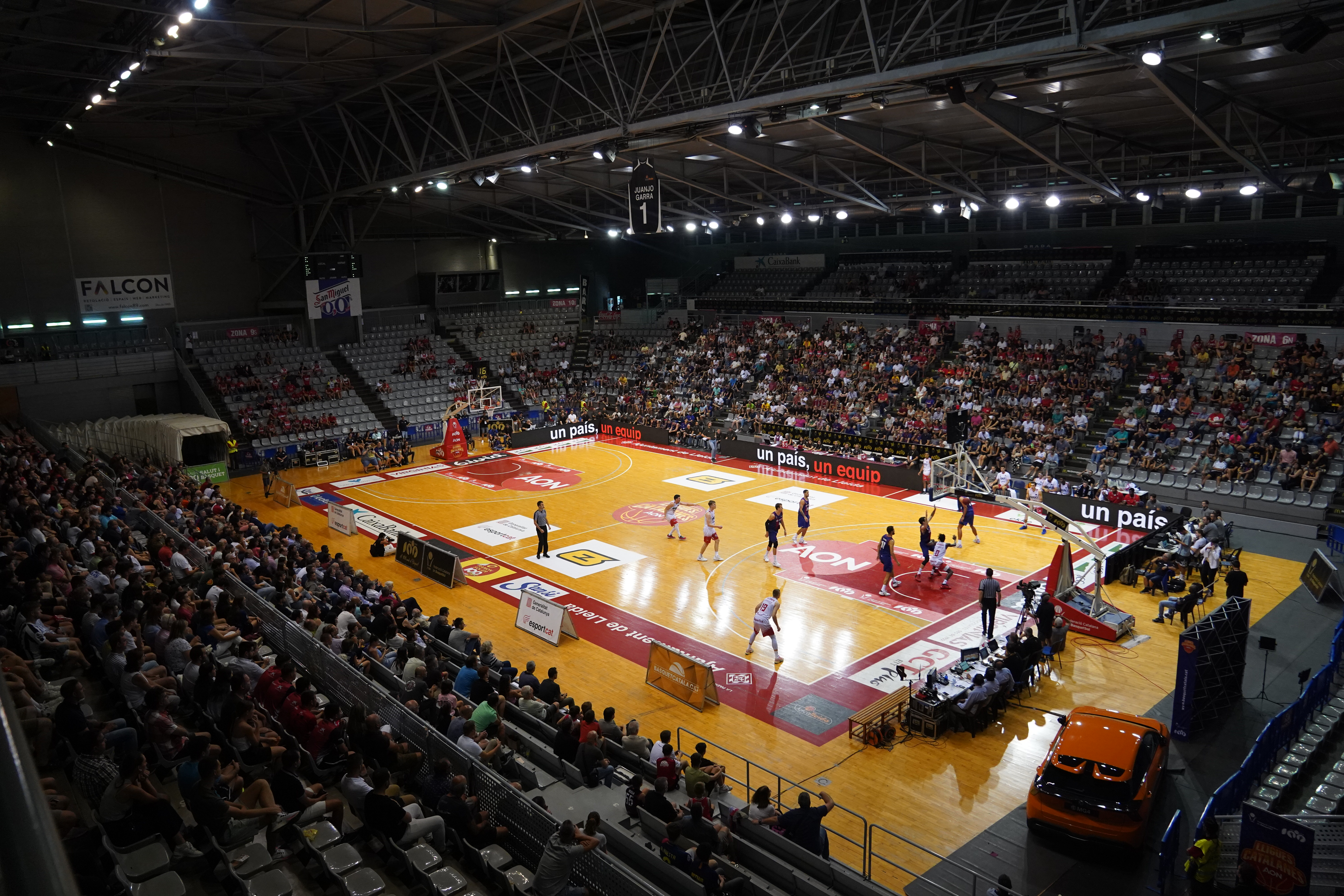
- Interactive map of Pavelló Barris Nord
- Location: Lleida, Catalonia, Spain
- Owner: Ajuntament de Lleida
- Capacity: 6,100

Construction
- Opened: 2001

Tenants
- CE Lleida Bàsquet (2001–2012); Força Lleida CE (2012–present)

Pavelló Barris Nord (Catalan for Northern Neighborhood Pavilion) is an arena in Lleida, Catalonia, Spain. It is primarily used for basketball games and the home arena of Força Lleida CE.

== History ==
The construction of the Pavelló Barris Nord began on 1 June 2001, after the promotion of CE Lleida Bàsquet to Liga ACB, with the aim to give to the club an arena that fulfills the requirements to play in the league. Built in four months, it was opened on 4 October 2001. From an initial capacity of 5,500 people, after being expanded in summer of 2003, its new capacity is of 6,100 seats.

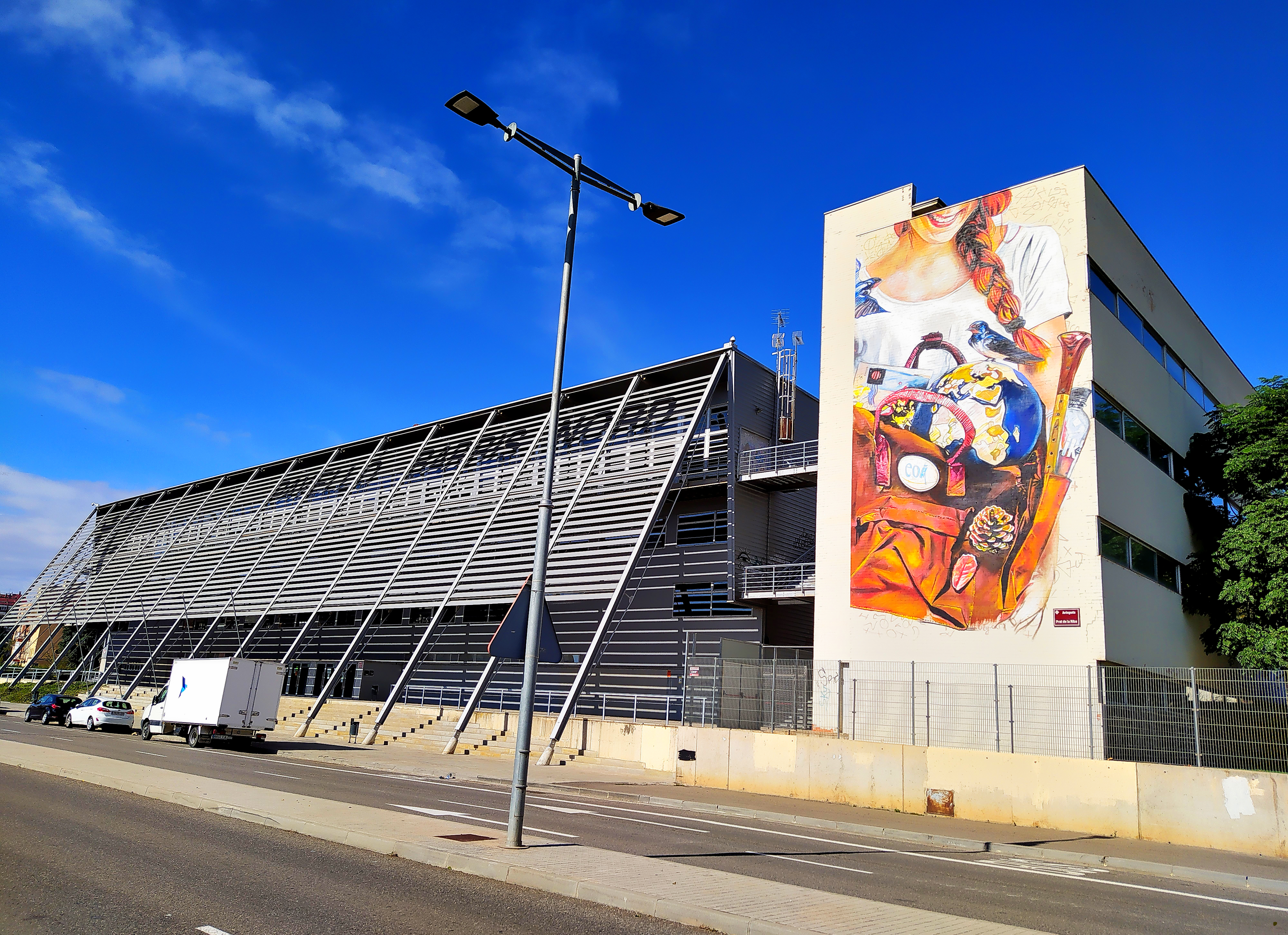
Outside view

The pavilion is located in Barris Nord, an area of Lleida made out of parts of the neighborhoods of Pardinyes, Secà de Sant Pere and Balàfia, in the intersection of Rambla de Pardinyes with Avinguda de Prat de la Riba.

When CE Lleida Bàsquet reached the ACB league, the team left the old Pavilion "Onze de Setembre" as the former did not fulfill the minimum requirements of capacity marked by league. The construction of a new pavilion was entrusted to a team of forty companies of Lleida, which achieved every a milestone: finishing it before the first day of the league, that is, 125 days afterwards.

The venue has hosted many musical events, including concerts by Fito & Fitipaldis, Miguel Bosé or El Canto del Loco, among others.

On August 23, 2008, the arena hosted the opening ceremony of the Fédération Aéronautique Internationale World Championships for Spacemodels.

On April 29, 2012, Barris Nord hosted the Final Four of the 2011–12 UEFA Futsal Cup.

On 13 and 14 May 2017, Barris Nord hosted the Final Four of the rink hockey's 2016–17 CERH European League.

== See also ==
- List of indoor arenas in Spain
