= Miles Norris =

American basketball player (born 2000)

- Norris with Bayern Munich in 2026

No. 0 – Bayern Munich
- Position: Power forward
- League: BBL; EuroLeague

Personal information
- Born: April 15, 2000 (age 26) San Francisco, California, U.S.
- Listed height: 6 ft 7 in (2.01 m)
- Listed weight: 220 lb (100 kg)

Career information
- High school: Mater Dei Catholic (Chula Vista, California); Helix (La Mesa, California); Brewster Academy (Wolfeboro, New Hampshire)
- College: Oregon (2018–2019); CC of San Francisco (2019–2020); UC Santa Barbara (2020–2023)
- NBA draft: 2023: undrafted
- Playing career: 2023–present

Career history
- 2023–2024: College Park Skyhawks
- 2024: Çağdaş Bodrumspor
- 2024–2025: Memphis Hustle
- 2025: Boston Celtics
- 2025: →Maine Celtics
- 2025–2026: FC Barcelona
- 2026–present: Bayern Munich

Career highlights
- Second-team All-Big West (2023)
- Stats at NBA.com
- Stats at Basketball Reference

Miles Benjamin Norris (born April 15, 2000) is an American professional basketball player for Bayern Munich of the German Basketball Bundesliga (BBL) and the EuroLeague. He played college basketball for Oregon, CC of San Francisco, and UC Santa Barbara.

== Early life and high school career ==
Norris grew up in San Diego and attended Mater Dei Catholic High School in Chula Vista for his freshman and sophomore years. Following his sophomore campaign, Norris was named All-CIF San Diego Section First Team after leading Mater Dei to a league title and CIF semifinals. For his junior season Norris attended Helix High School in La Mesa in which he averaged 11 points and 10 rebounds per game, helping Helix to a 31-win season and to the Division IV CIF State Championship Tournament game. Norris transferred to Brewster Academy in New Hampshire for his senior year where he helped Brewster claim the 2018 New England Prep School Athletic Council (NEPSAC) Class AAA regular season championship. He was rated a four-star recruit with a scout grade of 87 by ESPN and he was ranked 78th in ESPN's top-100 going into college.

== College career ==
Norris started his college career during the 2018-19 season at the University of Oregon, and appeared in 27 games all coming off the bench, averaging 10.5 minutes played per contest, 3.3 points and 1.9 rebounds per game.

He transferred to City College of San Francisco for his sophomore season. He helped CCSF to a 30–0 record, a Coast Conference north title and the Northern California Community College championship in 2019–20, where he averaged a team-leading 16.0 points, 6.1 rebounds, 1.4 blocked shots and 2.0 steals per game for the Rams.

The following season Norris transferred again to UC Santa Barbara where he played three seasons from 2020 to 2023 averaging 29.8 minutes played, 11.6 points and 5.5 rebounds per game.

== Professional career ==
=== College Park Skyhawks (2023–2024) ===
After going undrafted in the 2023 NBA draft, on July 6, 2023, Norris signed a two-way contract with the Atlanta Hawks, splitting time with their NBA G League affiliate, College Park Skyhawks. On December 22, he was waived by Atlanta without playing for them and four days later, he was acquired by College Park.

=== Çağdaş Bodrumspor (2024) ===
On April 3, 2024, Norris signed with Çağdaş Bodrumspor of the Basketbol Süper Ligi.

=== Memphis Hustle (2024–2025) ===
On October 16, 2024, Norris signed with the Memphis Grizzlies, but was waived three days later. On October 28, he joined the Memphis Hustle.

=== Boston Celtics / Maine Celtics (2025) ===
On March 2, 2025, Norris signed a two-way contract with the Boston Celtics. In three appearances for the Celtics, he averaged 2.3 points and 3.0 rebounds. On August 10, Norris was waived by Boston.

=== FC Barcelona (2025–2026) ===
On August 22, 2025, Norris signed a one-season contract with FC Barcelona of the Liga ACB and EuroLeague. On June 30, 2026, Norris left Barcelona upon the expiration of his contract.

=== Bayern Munich (2026–present) ===
On July 30, 2026, Norris signed with Bayern Munich of the German Basketball Bundesliga (BBL) and the EuroLeague.

== Career statistics ==
Legend
| GP | Games played | GS | Games started | MPG | Minutes per game |
| FG% | Field goal percentage | 3P% | 3-point field goal percentage | FT% | Free throw percentage |
| RPG | Rebounds per game | APG | Assists per game | SPG | Steals per game |
| BPG | Blocks per game | PPG | Points per game | **Bold** | Career high |

=== NBA ===
==== Regular season ====
| Year | Team | GP | GS | MPG | FG% | 3P% | FT% | RPG | APG | SPG | BPG | PPG |
|---|---|---|---|---|---|---|---|---|---|---|---|---|
| 2024–25 | Boston | 3 | 0 | 11.7 | .222 | .286 | .500 | 3.0 | .0 | .7 | .3 | 2.3 |
| Career | | 3 | 0 | 11.7 | .222 | .286 | .500 | 3.0 | .0 | .7 | .3 | 2.3 |

=== College ===
| Year | Team | GP | GS | MPG | FG% | 3P% | FT% | RPG | APG | SPG | BPG | PPG |
|---|---|---|---|---|---|---|---|---|---|---|---|---|
| 2018–19 | Oregon | 27 | 0 | 10.5 | **.540** | .240 | .500 | 1.9 | .1 | .5 | .3 | 3.3 |
| 2020–21 | UC Santa Barbara | 27 | 25 | 25.5 | .481 | .378 | .757 | 4.6 | **1.8** | .7 | **.9** | 9.7 |
| 2021–22 | UC Santa Barbara | 28 | 28 | 29.4 | .447 | .356 | .794 | 5.6 | 1.3 | .8 | .6 | 10.3 |
| 2022–23 | UC Santa Barbara | **35** | **35** | **33.5** | .490 | **.391** | **.844** | **6.1** | 1.2 | **1.1** | **.8** | **14.1** |
| Career | | 117 | 88 | 25.4 | .480 | .367 | .772 | 4.6 | 1.1 | .8 | .7 | 9.7 |
