= Pep Busquets =

Spanish basketball player (born 1999)

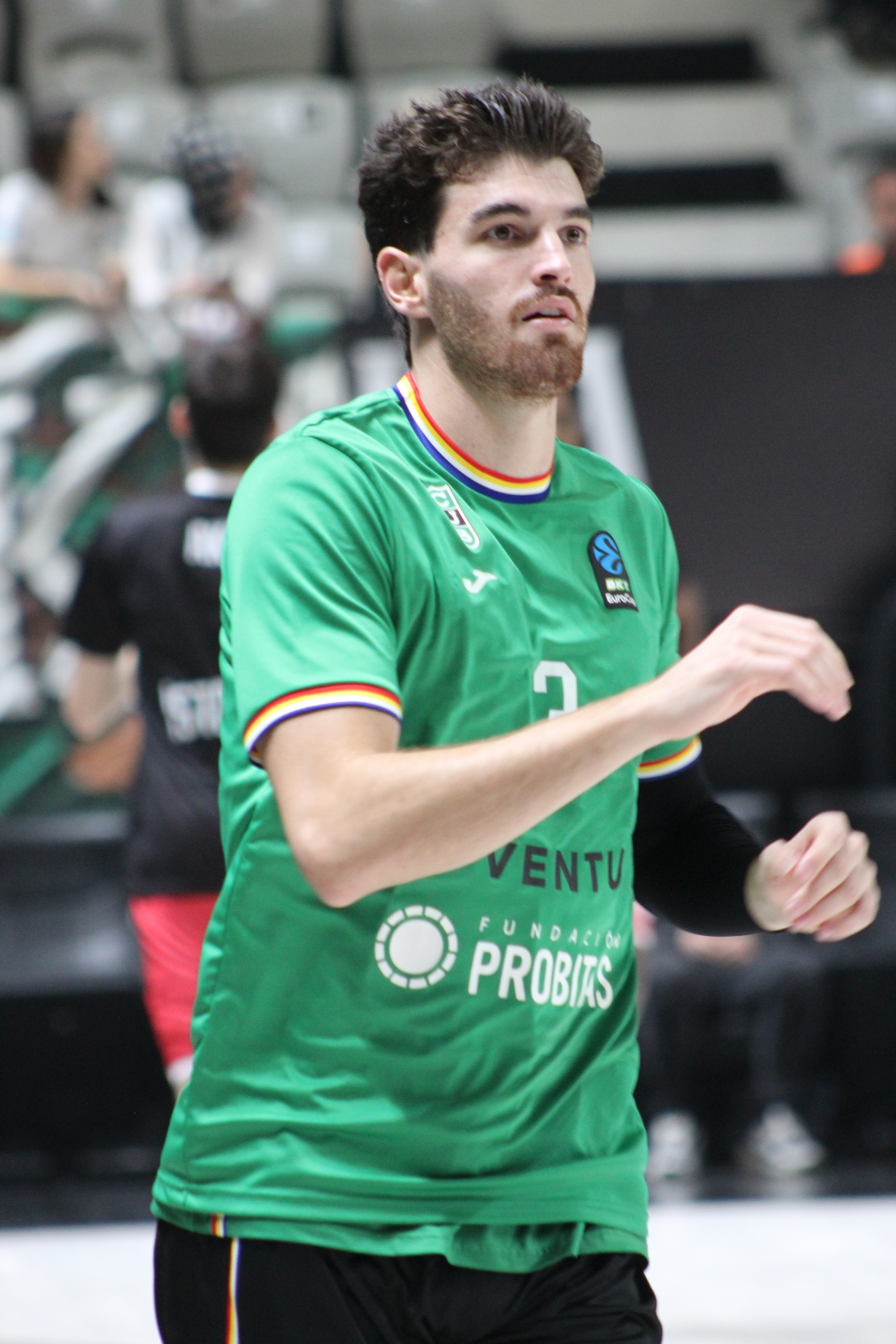
- Busquets with Joventut in 2024

No. 4 – Bàsquet Girona
- Position: Shooting guard / small forward
- League: Liga ACB

Personal information
- Born: 2 March 1999 (age 26) Granollers, Spain
- Listed height: 2.01 m (6 ft 7 in)
- Listed weight: 90 kg (198 lb)

Career information
- Playing career: 2017–present

Career history
- 2017–2025: Joventut
- 2017–2018: →Arenys Bàsquet
- 2018–2019: →CB Prat
- 2019–2020: →Lucentum Alicante
- 2020–2021: →Bàsquet Girona
- 2025–present: Bàsquet Girona
Medals
Men's basketball
Representing Spain
U18 European Championship
Silver medal – second place	2017 Slovakia	U18 Team
U20 European Championship
Silver medal – second place	2019 Israel	U20 Team

Josep "Pep" Busquets Costa (born 2 March 1999), is a Spanish professional basketball player for Bàsquet Girona of the Spanish Liga ACB. He has also represented the Spanish national team. Standing at 6 ft 7 in (2.01 m), Busquets can play both as a guard or a forward.

== Early life and youth career ==
Growing up in Granollers, Catalonia, Busquets is a product of the Joventut Badalona basketball academy, which he joined in 2011. After making his way through the club's youth ranks, Busquets made his debut for the first team in 2017.

== Professional career ==
=== Joventut Badalona (2017–2025) ===
In 2017, Busquets was loaned to associated club Bàsquet Arenys to compete in the Liga EBA. The following season, he was loaned to CB Prat, then playing in the LEB Oro.

He would make his Liga ACB debut with Joventut at the end of the 2018–19 season, before joining Lucentum Alicante in the LEB Oro on loan for the rest of the season. He would return to Joventut in Jun 2020 and take part in the 2020 ACB Playoffs

He would join Bàsquet Girona on loan in June 2020, playing in the 2020–21 LEB Oro. He spent the next three and a half seasons playing in the Liga ACB with Joventut, playing 213 official games with 'la Penya' before leaving the Badalona-based team in January 2025.

=== Bàsquet Girona (2025–present) ===
Busquets was announced as a new Bàsquet Girona player on January 2, 2025. When Busquets joined, the team was in a relegation battle at the bottom of the Liga ACB. By the end of the season, Girona successfully secured a spot in the 2025–26 ACB season and Busquets extended his contract with the Catalans until 2028.

== National team career ==
Busquets has played in several international tournaments with the youth ranks of the Spanish national team, playing the U18 European Championship in 2017 and the U20 European Championship in 2019.

He made his debut the senior Spanish national team in a qualifier game for 2023 FIBA Basketball World Cup.

== Awards and accomplishments ==
=== Spanish junior national team ===
- 2017 U18 European Championship: Silver
- 2019 U20 European Championship: Silver
