= Nikola Marić =

Bosnian basketball player (born 1998)

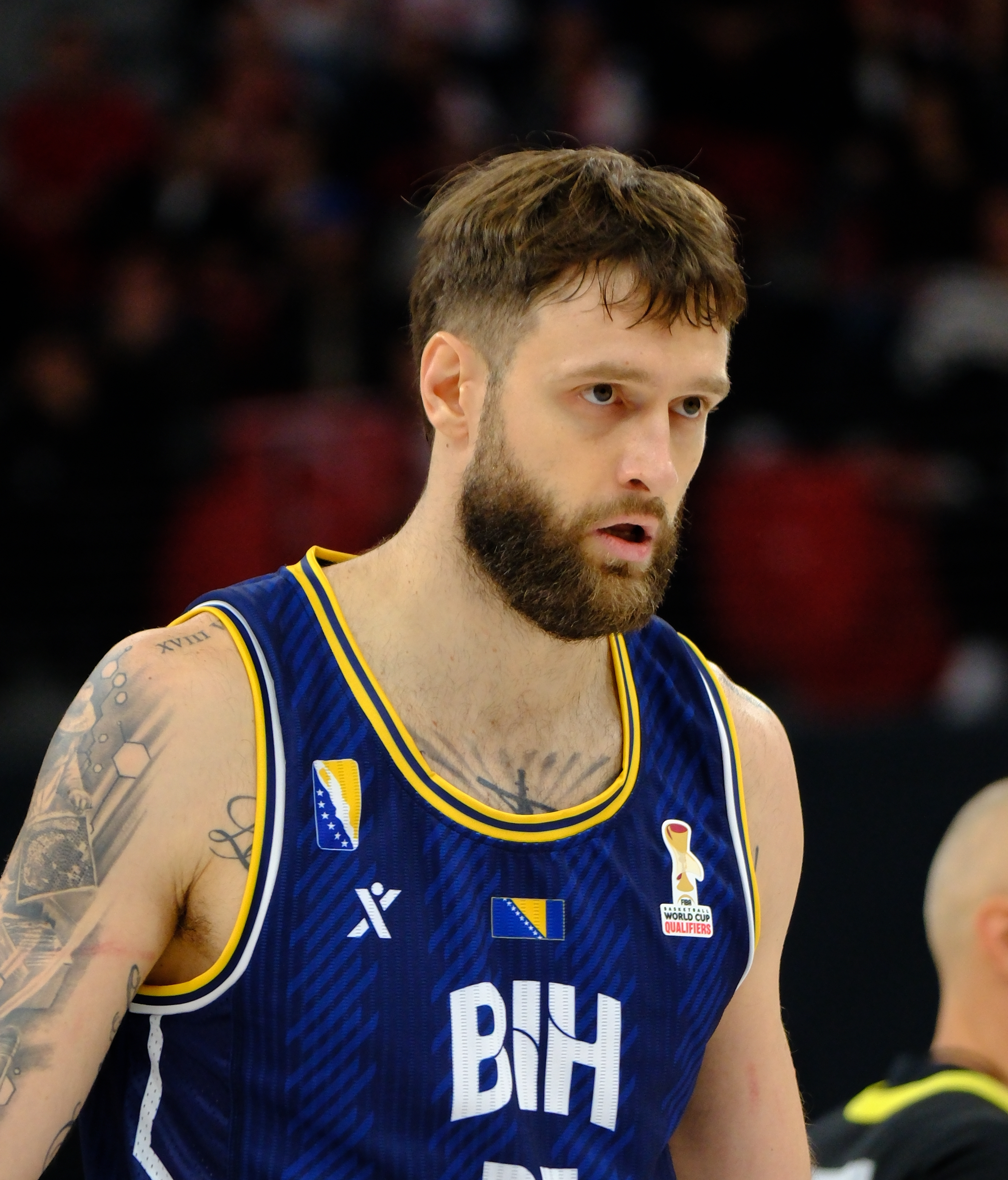
- Marić with Bosnia and Herzegovina in 2025

No. 25 – Bàsquet Girona
- Position: Power forward
- League: Liga ACB

Personal information
- Born: December 19, 1998 (age 27) Trebinje, Bosnia and Herzegovina
- Listed height: 2.06 m (6 ft 9 in)
- Listed weight: 113 kg (249 lb)

Career information
- College: UALR (2018–2022)
- NBA draft: 2023: undrafted
- Playing career: 2016–present

Career history
- 2016–2017: MoraBanc Andorra
- 2022–2025: Igokea
- 2025–present: Bàsquet Girona

Nikola Marić (born December 19, 1998) is a Bosnian professional basketball player who plays for Bàsquet Girona of the Spanish Liga ACB. Standing at 6 ft 9 in (2.06 m), Marić plays as a power forward.

== Early life and youth career ==
Born in Trebinje, Bosnia and Herzegovina, Marić started playing basketball in the youth ranks of his hometown's team, KK Leotar. He would later play for the youth teams of Joventut Badalona and Baloncesto Fuenlabrada in Spain, playing in the Liga EBA category with the latter.

In 2016, he signed for MoraBanc Andorra and made his professional debut in the Liga ACB, playing 7 games in the 2016–17 ACB season.

== College career ==
Marić played college basketball for the Little Rock Trojans of the NCAA between 2018 and 2022. He played 87 games over four seasons, averaging 11.7 points per game and 5.1 rebounds per game. In the 2020–21 season he led the Sun Belt Conference in 2-point field goals, with 143 in total.

== Professional career ==
After finishing his college career, Marić signed for KK Igokea of the Bosnian Liga BiH and the ABA League in August 2022. Playing for three seasons with Igokea, his best ABA League performance was on a 2023–24 season win over SC Derby in which he Marić scored 20 points and recorded 4 rebounds and 2 blocks. In his time with Igokea, Marić also played in the Basketball Champions League.

On June 30, 2025, he signed for Bàsquet Girona of the Liga ACB. After averaging 7.1 points and 3.2 rebounds per game in 20 games with the Catalans, Marić signed a contract extension for one more season with Girona on February 27, 2026.

== National team career ==
Marić has represented the Bosnia and Herzegovina national team's youth categories, taking part in the 2016 FIBA U18 European Championship with the Bosnia and Herzegovina U18 national team. He has also represented the senior Bosnia and Herzegovina national team, taking part in 2027 FIBA Basketball World Cup qualification games.
