= Bàsquet Girona =

- League: Liga ACB; Europe Cup
- Founded: 16 May 2014; 12 years ago
- History: CEB Marc Gasol (2014–2016); CEB Girona Marc Gasol (2016–2017); Bàsquet Girona (2017–present)
- Arena: Fontajau
- Capacity: 5,200
- Location: Girona, Spain
- Team colors: Red and white
- President: Marc Gasol
- Vice-president: Pau Gasol
- Head coach: Moncho Fernández
- Website: basquetgirona.com
| Home | Away | Europe |

Club Bàsquet Girona 2014, SAD, commonly known as Bàsquet Girona (pronounced [βasˈket ʝiˈɾona]), is a professional basketball club based in Girona, Spain. It was founded in 2014 by former NBA player Marc Gasol. The team plays in the Liga ACB. Its home arena is Fontajau.

== History ==
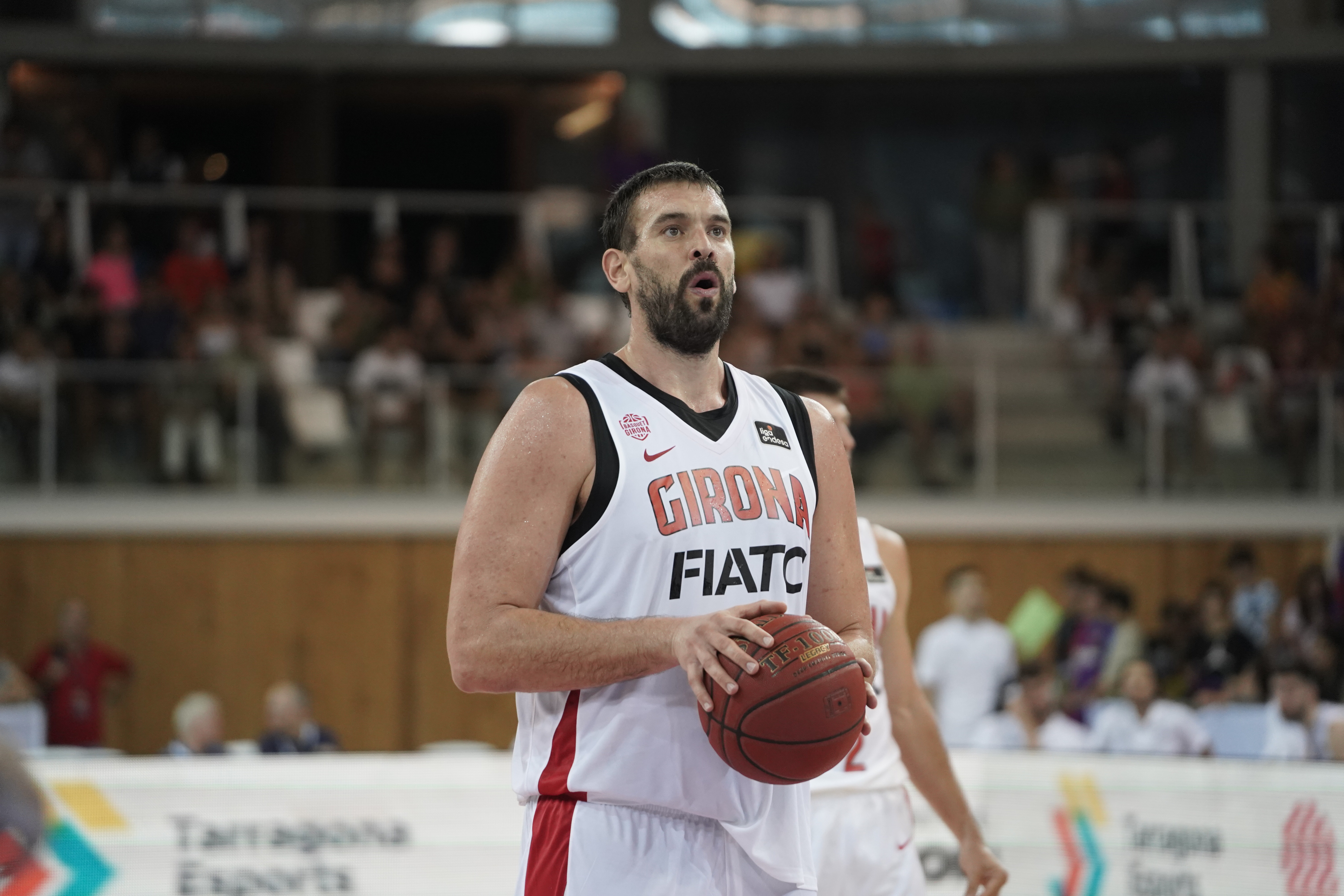
Marc Gasol with Girona in 2022

The club was founded in 2014 by NBA player Marc Gasol, who previously played in CB Girona between 2006 and 2008, with the name of Club Escola Bàsquet Marc Gasol. In its first years, the club only competed in youth categories.

In 2016, it added the name of the city of Girona to the name of the club thus becoming CEB Girona Marc Gasol and one year later, it changed again its name to simply Bàsquet Girona.

Also in 2017, and with the aim to become the main men's basketball club in the city, the club created the senior squad that would start competing in the fourth-tier Liga EBA after achieving a vacant spot in the league. Quim Costa would be the head coach for the debut season.

In November 2021, Gasol announced he would play with the club, by that time in LEB Oro, through the end of the 2021–22 season before deciding whether to retire from play.

The club earned promotion to the Liga ACB for the first time in its history in June 2022, after defeating Movistar Estudiantes in the LEB Oro playoff final, 66–60.

== Season by season ==
| Season | Tier | Division | Pos. | W–L | Copa del Rey | Other cups | | European competitions |
|---|---|---|---|---|---|---|---|---|
| 2017–18 | 4 | Liga EBA | 3rd (Note: Achieved one of the places after the expansion of the LEB Plata.) | 17–9 | | | | |
| 2018–19 | 3 | LEB Plata | 9th | 18–16 | | | | |
| 2019–20 | 3 | LEB Plata | 2nd (Note: Season curtailed due to the COVID-19 pandemic.) | 19–6 | | Copa LEB Plata | RU | |
| 2020–21 | 2 | LEB Oro | 4th | 12–14 | | | | |
| 2021–22 | 2 | LEB Oro | 2nd | 26–13 | | | | |
| 2022–23 | 1 | Liga ACB | 15th | 11–23 | | | | |
| 2023–24 | 1 | Liga ACB | 14th | 13–21 | | | | |
| 2024–25 | 1 | Liga ACB | 14th | 12–22 | | | | |
| 2025–26 | 1 | Liga ACB | 12th | 14–20 | | | | |

== Players ==
=== Current roster ===
Note: Flags indicate national team eligibility at FIBA-sanctioned events. Players may hold other non-FIBA nationalities not displayed.

Bàsquet Girona roster
Players
Coaches

| Pos. | No. | Nat. | Name | Ht. | Age |
|---|---|---|---|---|---|
| G | 0 | (United States) | McClung, Mac | 1.88 m (6 ft 2 in) | 27 – 6 January 1999 |
| F/C | 1 | (Netherlands) | N'Guessan, David | 2.06 m (6 ft 9 in) | 26 – 12 June 2000 |
| G/F | 2 | (Argentina) | Fjellerup, Máximo | 1.98 m (6 ft 6 in) | 28 – 25 November 1997 |
| G/F | 4 | (Spain) | Busquets, Pep | 2.01 m (6 ft 7 in) | 27 – 2 March 1999 |
| F/C | 5 | (Slovenia) | Kunc, Aljaž | 2.07 m (6 ft 9 in) | 27 – 30 July 1999 |
| SG | 7 | (Slovenia) | Glas, Gregor | 1.97 m (6 ft 6 in) | 25 – 29 April 2001 |
| PG | 9 | (Lithuania) | Stenionis, Dominykas | 1.79 m (5 ft 10 in) | 24 – 3 July 2002 |
| G | 10 | (Spain) | Vázquez, Isaac | 1.93 m (6 ft 4 in) | 22 – 10 October 2004 |
| G | 11 | (United States) | Whittaker, Stanley | 1.83 m (6 ft 0 in) | 32 – 21 October 1994 |
| C | 12 | (Lithuania) | Geben, Martinas | 2.08 m (6 ft 10 in) | 32 – 20 October 1994 |
| G | 21 | (Poland) | Pluta Jr., Andrzej | 1.90 m (6 ft 3 in) | 26 – 3 June 2000 |
| F | 23 | (Spain) | Martínez, Sergi (C) | 2.02 m (6 ft 8 in) | 27 – 10 May 1999 |
| SG | 24 | (Dominican Republic) | Pérez, Jassel | 1.95 m (6 ft 5 in) | 25 – 24 September 2001 |
| F/C | 25 | (Bosnia and Herzegovina) | Marić, Nikola | 2.04 m (6 ft 8 in) | 27 – 19 December 1998 |

Head coach

- (Spanish Basketball Federation) Moncho Fernández

Assistant coach(es)

- (Spanish Basketball Federation) Miquel Fuentes
- (Spanish Basketball Federation) Albert Sàbat
- (Spanish Basketball Federation) Roger Dehesa

Legend

- (C) Team captain
- (Y) Youth player
- Injured

- Roster
- Transactions
Updated: October 25, 2026

=== Depth chart ===
| Pos. | Starting 5 | Bench 1 | Bench 2 | Bench 3 |
|---|---|---|---|---|
| C | Martinas Geben | Aljaž Kunc |
| PF | David N'Guessan | Nikola Marić |
| SF | Sergi Martínez † | Pep Busquets † | Máximo Fjellerup |
| SG | Stanley Whittaker * | Jassel Pérez | Isaac Vázquez † | Gregor Glas |
| PG | Mac McClung * | Andrzej Pluta Jr. | Dominykas Stenionis |

Notes: Blue † – homegrown player; (Note: A homegrown player is a player that played for at least three years before the age of 20 on a Spanish team. In Liga ACB, the team must register at least four homegrown players in rosters of 10–12 players or at least three homegrown players in rosters of 8–9 players.) Red * – overseas player; (Note: An overseas player is a player from outside EEA, FIBA Europe or ACP states. In Liga ACB, the team may register at most two overseas players.) Green ‡ – youth player (Note: In Liga ACB, the team may register under-22 players linked to the youth system.)

== Head coaches ==
- (Spanish Basketball Federation) Quim Costa (2017−2019)
- (Spanish Basketball Federation) Àlex Formento (2019−2020)
- (Spanish Basketball Federation) Carles Marco (2020−2021)
- (Spanish Basketball Federation) Jordi Sargatal (2021−2022)
- (Spanish Basketball Federation) Aíto García Reneses (2022−2023)
- (Spanish Basketball Federation) Salva Camps (2023−2024)
- (Hellenic Basketball Federation) Fotios Katsikaris (2024)
- (Spanish Basketball Federation) Moncho Fernández (2024−present)

== Notable players ==
Note: Flags indicate national team eligibility at FIBA-sanctioned events. Players may hold other non-FIBA nationalities not displayed.

Criteria

To appear in this section a player must have either:

- Set a club record or won an individual award while at the club
- Played at least one official international match for their national team at any time
- Played at least one official NBA match at any time.

- (Spain) Quino Colom
- (Spain) Marc Gasol
- (Spain) Pierre Oriola
- (Spain) Jordi Trias
- (Spain) Eric Vila
- (Argentina) Máximo Fjellerup
- (Argentina) Patricio Garino
- (Canada) Khem Birch
- (France) Yves Pons
- (Croatia) Roko Prkačin
- (Serbia) Dušan Miletić
- (United States) (Nigeria) Ike Iroegbu
- (United States) (Uganda) Nike Sibande
- (United States) John Jenkins
- (United States) Kameron Taylor
