= Galicia national basketball team =

Basketball team of Galicia (Spain)

Galicia
- National federation: Galician Basketball Federation
- Coach: Quino Salvo
Home

First international
- (Galicia (Spain)) Galicia 63–58 Japan (Lugo, Spain; 20 June 2006)

Biggest win
- (Galicia (Spain)) Galicia 70–62 Portugal (Girona, Spain; 6 June 2008)

Biggest defeat
- Catalonia 93–72 Galicia (Galicia (Spain)) (Bilbao, Spain; 27 June 2009)

The Galicia national basketball team is the basketball team of Galicia (Spain). The team is not affiliated with FIBA and only plays friendly games.

== History ==
Galicia's first game was held in 2006 in Lugo against Japan; the following year, the team played against Cuba. Galicia won only the first game.

One year later, Galicia started to play the Torneo de las Naciones, a tournament co-organized with the Basque Country and Catalonia. It was played from 2008 to 2010.

== Games played ==
| 20 June 2006 | Galicia | 63–58 | Japan | Lugo |
| | | | | Arena: Pavillón dos Deportes |

| 21 June 2007 | Galicia | 76–89 | Cuba | Ourense |
| 21:00 | Scoring by quarter: 18–25, 9–22, 22–20, 27–22 |
| | Pts: E. Gómez 15 | Report | Pts: Hemmott 21 | Arena: Pazo Paco Paz; Attendance: 1,200; Referees: Cortés, Castro, Guillán |

| 6 June 2008 | Galicia | 70–62 | Portugal | Fontajau, Girona |
| 18:00 | Scoring by quarter: 16–15, 20–8, 14–20, 20–19 |
| | Pts: L. Fernández 17 | Report | Pts: Gomes 20 |

| 7 June 2008 | Basque Country | 80–72 | Galicia | Girona |
| | Pts: L. Fernández 18 | Report | Pts: Salgado 19 | Arena: Fontajau |

| 27 June 2009 | Basque Country | 84–80 | Galicia | Bilbao |
| | Scoring by quarter: 25–21, 22–22, 20–12, 17–25 |
| | Pts: Otegi 20; Rebs: Otegi 11; Asts: Alonso 4 PIR: Otegi 29 | Report; Stats | Pts: Castro 15; Rebs: Antelo 8 Asts: Seijo 2 PIR: Castro 15 | Arena: Pabellón Municipal de Deportes La Casilla; Referees: García, Alonso, López |

| 27 June 2009 | Catalonia | 93–72 | Galicia | Bilbao |
| | Scoring by quarter: 24–15, 22–16, 26–20, 21–21 |
| | Pts: B. Álvarez 26; Rebs: Fornas, M. Fernández 8 Asts: M. Fernández 4 PIR: Fornas 25 | Report; Stats | Pts: R. Fernández 11; Rebs: Cabanas 6 Asts: De la Fuente, Esmorís 2 PIR: Esmorís 13 | Arena: Pabellón Municipal de Deportes La Casilla; Referees: Loroño, Quintas |

| 3 July 2010 | Galicia | 71–76 | Lithuania 'B' | Lugo |
| 20:00 | Scoring by quarter: 26–21, 19–19, 11–14, 15–22 |
| | Pts: Cabanas 20; Rebs: three players 7 Asts: L. López 5 PIR: Cabanas 25 | Stats | Pts: Vingelis 22; Rebs: Birbalas 8 Asts: Malasauskas, Vingelis 4 PIR: Birbalas, Vingelis 21 | Arena: Pazo dos Deportes |

| 3 July 2010 | Galicia | 71–79 | Basque Country | Lugo |
| 18:00 | Scoring by quarter: 17–12, 21–26, 16–14, 17–27 |
| | Pts: L. Fernández, L. López 11; Rebs: Cabanas 11; Asts: L. López 5 PIR: Pereiro 17 | Stats | Pts: Casado, Lasa 15; Rebs: Iglesias, M. Uriz 6 Asts: R. Uriz 3 PIR: R. Uriz 16 | Arena: Pazo dos Deportes |

== Women's team ==
=== Games played ===
| 29 June 2006 | Galicia | 59–75 | Japan | Vigo |
| | | | | Arena: As Travesas |

| 20 June 2007 | Galicia | 63–81 | Cuba | Vilagarcía de Arousa |
| | | | | Arena: Fontecarmoa |

| 16 May 2008 | Galicia | 96–62 | Basque Country | Santiago de Compostela |
| | | | | Arena: Santa Isabel |

| 17 May 2008 | Galicia | 51–66 | Catalonia | Santiago de Compostela |
| | | | | Arena: Santa Isabel |

| 22 May 2010 | Basque Country | 44–62 | Galicia | Durango |

| 13 May 2011 | Basque Country | 58–52 | Galicia | Getxo |

| 18 May 2012 | Galicia | 51–62 | Basque Country | Noia |

== List of Galician basketball players who also represented FIBA teams in international matches ==
- Alberto Abalde
- Jonathan Barreiro
- Miguel Juane
- Javi Rodríguez Pérez
- Fernando Romay
- Manel Sánchez
- Ismael Santos
- Fran Vázquez

== See also ==
- Galicia national football team
- Torneo de las Naciones
