= Basketball in Spain =

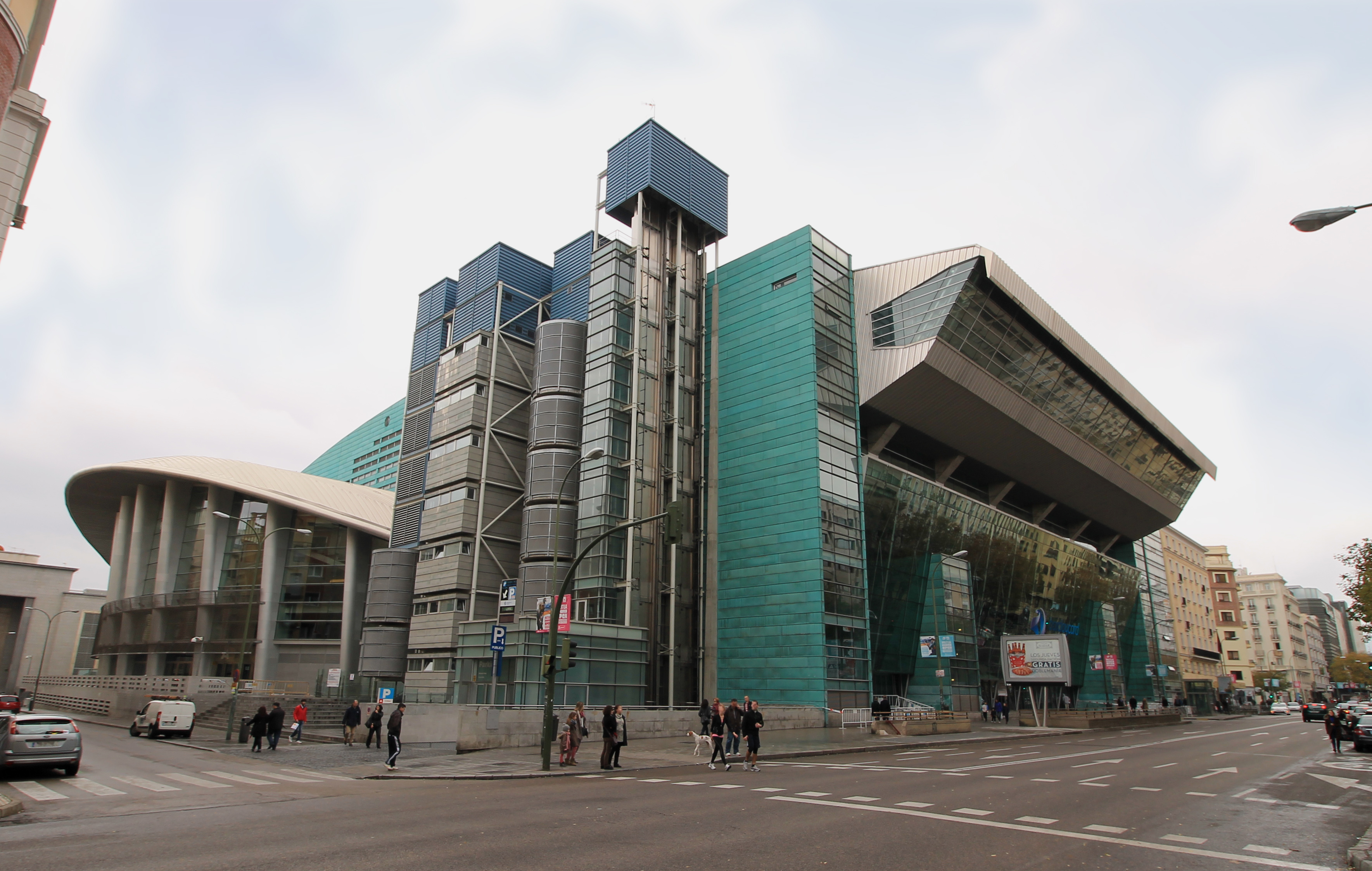
- Barclaycard Center, Real Madrid’s Arena.
- Country: Spain
- Governing body: FEB
- National team: Spain
- First played: 1923
- Registered players: 385,110
- Clubs: 3,619

National competitions
- List: FIBA World Cup; EuroBasket; Summer Olympics

Club competitions
- List: League: Liga Endesa LEB Oro LEB Plata Liga EBA Primera División; Cups: Copa del Rey Copa Federación Supercopa de España

International competitions
- List: Euroleague; Eurocup; Basketball Champions League; FIBA Europe Cup

Basketball is the second most popular sport in Spain, directly behind association football. The top Spanish League, Liga ACB, is a member of ULEB, and the top Spanish League teams can compete in Europe, most notably in the Euroleague and Eurocup, and also under the FIBA Europe umbrella, in the FIBA Europe Cup. The Spanish teams also compete in a national domestic cup competition each year, called the Copa del Rey de Baloncesto, which is played by the top eight teams in the standings of the Liga ACB, at the end of the first half of the regular season.

== Spanish basketball league system ==
=== The tier levels ===
For the 2018–19 season, the Spanish basketball league system is as follows:

Level	League				
1	Liga ACB (18 teams) (previously Liga Nacional)				
2	Primera FEB; Formerly LEB Oro (18 teams)				
3	Segunda FEB; Formerly LEB Plata (24 teams)				
4	Tercera FEB Group A Formerly Liga EBA (Asturias) (Basque Country (autonomous community)) (Cantabria) (Castile and León) (Galicia (Spain)) (Navarre) (La Rioja) (2 sub-groups of 14 teams each)	Tercera FEB Group B Formerly Liga EBA (Canary Islands) (Castilla–La Mancha) (Community of Madrid) (16 teams)	Tercera FEB Group C Formerly Liga EBA (Aragon) (Balearic Islands) (Catalonia) (2 sub-groups of 14 teams each)	Tercera FEB Group D Formerly Liga EBA (Andalusia) (Ceuta) (Extremadura) (Melilla) (2 sub-groups of 10 teams each)	Tercera FEB Group E Formerly Liga EBA (Region of Murcia) (Valencian Community) (16 teams)
5	Primera División (15 groups, one for each autonomous community except Basque Country, La Rioja, and Navarra, who share the same group; in Catalonia, known as Copa Catalunya)				
	Regional and lower divisions				

== Evolution of the Spanish basketball league system ==
Tier\Years	1957–78	1978–83	1983–90	1990–94	1994–96	1996–2000	2000–07	2007–09	2009–
1	1ª División		ACB						
2	2ª División	1ª División B		1ª División	EBA	LEB (since 2007, LEB Oro)			
3	3ª División	2ª División				EBA	LEB 2 (since 2007, LEB Plata)		
4	Lower	3ª División	Lower	Lower	Lower	2ª División	EBA	LEB Bronce	EBA
5	Lower	Lower	Lower	Lower	Lower	Lower	1ª División	EBA	1ª División
6	Lower	Lower	Lower	Lower	Lower	Lower	Lower	1ª División	Lower
7	Lower	Lower	Lower	Lower	Lower	Lower	Lower	Lower	Lower

== Spanish women's basketball league system ==
Level	League				
1	Liga Femenina (14 teams)				
2	Liga Femenina Challenge (16 teams)				
3	Liga Femenina 2 Group A (12 teams)			Liga Femenina 2 Group B (12 teams)	
4	1ª División Group A (Asturias) (Cantabria) (Castile and León) (Galicia (Spain))	1ª División Group B (Aragon) (Basque Country (autonomous community)) (La Rioja) (Navarre)	1ª División Group C (Balearic Islands) (Catalonia)	1ª División Group D (Castilla–La Mancha) (Community of Madrid) (Region of Murcia) (Valencian Community)	1ª División Group E (Andalusia) (Canary Islands) (Ceuta) (Extremadura) (Melilla)

== Spain national basketball team ==
In 2022, Spain won its fourth EuroBasket title after defeating France 88–76 in the final. Willy Hernangómez was named the tournament's Most Valuable Player.

== Autonomous teams ==
Like in football, several Autonomous Communities have their own autonomous team. These teams are not recognized by FIBA Europe, and only play in friendly games.

Between 2008 and 2010, the Torneo de las Naciones was played between the teams of Basque Country, Catalonia, and Galicia, and a foreign national team was invited. The following Autonomous Communities have played at least one friendly game:

- Andalusia
- Aragon
- Asturias
- Balearic Islands
- Basque Country
- Cantabria
- Castile and León
- Catalonia
- Galicia

Also, Menorca has got a basketball team which plays biennially in the Island Games.

On the other hand, Gibraltar has its own national team recognized by FIBA Europe. Gibraltar plays biannually in the European Basketball Championship for Small Countries and, like Menorca, the Island Games.

== Other competitions ==
- Copa del Rey de Baloncesto
- Supercopa de España de Baloncesto
- Copa Príncipe de Asturias

== Attendances ==
The average attendance per top-flight league season and the basketball club with the highest average attendance:

Season	League average	Best club	Best club average
2024-25	6,633	Unicaja	9,940
