= Lucho Fernández =

Lucho Fernández may refer to:

- Lucho Fernández (basketball)
- Lucho Fernandez (actor)
