= 2023–24 FC Barcelona Bàsquet season =

Spanish basketball club season

FC Barcelona
2023–24 season
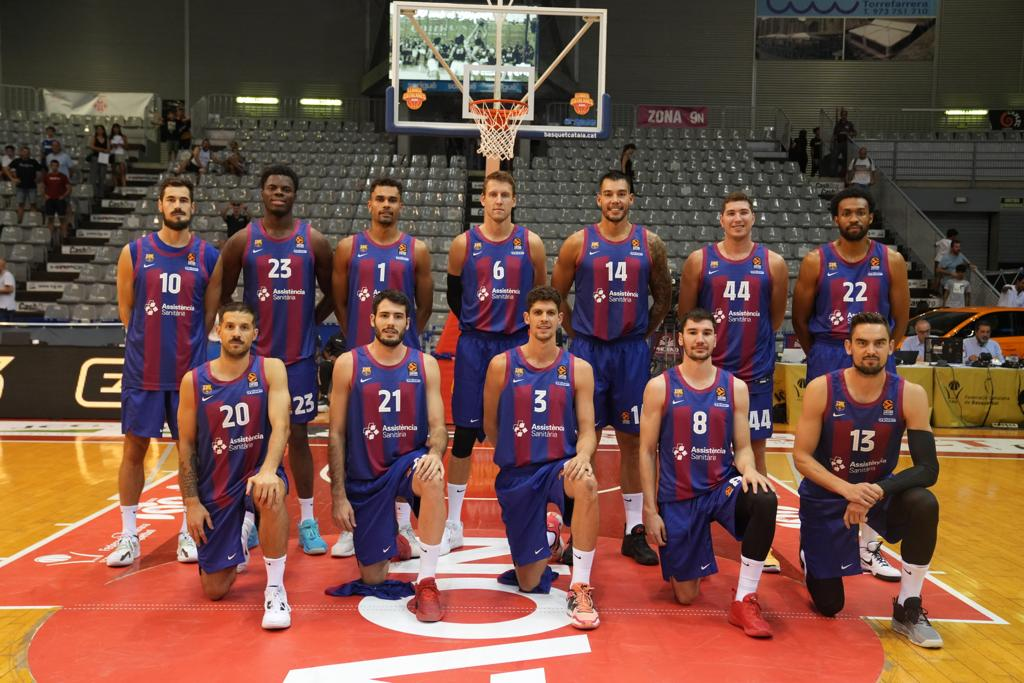
- Barcelona roster in September 2023
- President: Joan Laporta
- Head coach: Roger Grimau
- Arena: Palau Blaugrana
- Liga ACB: Semifinals
- EuroLeague: Playoff series
- Copa del Rey: Runners-up
- Supercopa de España: Semifinals
- Highest home attendance: 7,742 vs Olympiacos (8 May 2024)
- Average home attendance: 6,444 (in EuroLeague); 5,614 (in Liga ACB)
- Biggest win: 109–68 vs Casademont Zaragoza (3 March 2024)
- Biggest defeat: 92–58 vs Olympiacos (2 May 2024)
Home	Away	Third
- All statistics correct as of 18 June 2025.

The 2023–24 season was FC Barcelona's 97th in existence, their 58th consecutive season in the top flight of Spanish basketball and 25th consecutive season in the EuroLeague.

In the 2023–24 season, FC Barcelona competed in the Liga ACB, Copa del Rey, Spanish Supercup and EuroLeague.

== Overview ==
=== Pre-season ===
After three seasons as the team's head coach, Šarūnas Jasikevičius parted ways with Barcelona on June 26, 2023. On the same day, the club announced former player Roger Grimau would take over after signing a two-season contract.

The first signing of the summer was Joel Parra, a Joventut Badalona academy product who won the ACB Best Young Player award in the 2021-22 season. Parra signed a four-year contract, with the agreement announced on July 7. Darío Brizuela, a shooting guard with experience in Unicaja Málaga and Estudiantes, was the second signing. He was announced on July 13 and signed a three-season contract. Spanish center Willy Hernangómez became a Barcelona player on the same day, as Real Madrid decided not to match the offer made by the Catalans on July 7 (Madrid held rights over Hernangómez as their former club). Hernangómez had previously played in the NBA, his last team being the New Orleans Pelicans. 2014 NBA Draft number 2 pick Jabari Parker was the last summer addition, signing a one-year contract. Parker had last played for the Boston Celtics and Barcelona was his first experience in European basketball.

In early September, Barcelona played a friendly game against Força Lleida CE at the Pavelló Barris Nord. Between September 11 and 12, Barcelona took part in the 2023 edition of the Lliga Catalana de Bàsquet, held in Lleida. Barcelona won the final against Bàsquet Manresa and Nicolás Laprovíttola was named Finals MVP.

== Players ==
=== Roster ===
Note: Flags indicate national team eligibility at FIBA-sanctioned events. Players may hold other non-FIBA nationalities not displayed.

FC Barcelona roster
Players
Coaches

Pos.	No.	Nat.	Name	Ht.	Wt.	Age
F/C	1	(Germany)	da Silva, Oscar	2.06 m (6 ft 9 in)	105 kg (231 lb)	25 – 21 September 1998
SF	3	(Spain)	Paulí, Oriol	2.01 m (6 ft 7 in)	84 kg (185 lb)	29 – 20 May 1994
F/C	6	(Czech Republic)	Veselý, Jan	2.13 m (7 ft 0 in)	110 kg (243 lb)	34 – 24 April 1990
SG	8	(Spain)	Brizuela, Darío	1.88 m (6 ft 2 in)	73 kg (161 lb)	29 – 8 November 1994
PG	9	(Spain)	Rubio, Ricky	1.88 m (6 ft 2 in)	86 kg (190 lb)	33 – 21 October 1990
F	10	(Serbia)	Kalinić, Nikola	2.03 m (6 ft 8 in)	105 kg (231 lb)	32 – 8 November 1991
G	13	(Czech Republic)	Satoranský, Tomáš	2.00 m (6 ft 7 in)	95 kg (209 lb)	32 – 30 October 1991
C	14	(Spain)	Hernangómez, Willy	2.11 m (6 ft 11 in)	113 kg (249 lb)	29 – 27 May 1994
G	20	(Argentina)	Laprovíttola, Nicolás	1.91 m (6 ft 3 in)	82 kg (181 lb)	34 – 31 January 1990
G/F	21	(Spain)	Abrines, Álex (C)	1.98 m (6 ft 6 in)	91 kg (201 lb)	30 – 1 August 1993
PF	22	(United States)	Parker, Jabari	2.03 m (6 ft 8 in)	108 kg (238 lb)	29 – 15 March 1995
C	23	(Nigeria)	Nnaji, James	2.12 m (6 ft 11 in)	113 kg (249 lb)	19 – 14 August 2004
G/F	24	(Spain)	Caicedo, Michael	1.98 m (6 ft 6 in)	90 kg (198 lb)	20 – 21 June 2003
PG	31	(Lithuania)	Jokubaitis, Rokas	1.93 m (6 ft 4 in)	88 kg (194 lb)	23 – 19 November 2000
F	44	(Spain)	Parra, Joel	2.03 m (6 ft 8 in)	95 kg (209 lb)	24 – 4 April 2000

Head coach

- (Spain) Roger Grimau

Assistant coach(es)

- (Spain) Carles Marco
- (Spain) Victor Sada
- (Spain) Oscar Orellana

Team manager

- (Spain) Juan Carlos Navarro

Legend

- (C) Team captain
- Injured

- Roster

=== Depth chart ===
Pos.	Starting 5	Bench 1	Bench 2	Bench 3
C	Jan Veselý	Willy Hernangómez †		James Nnaji ‡
PF	Jabari Parker *	Joel Parra †	Oscar da Silva
SF	Álex Abrines †	Nikola Kalinić
SG	Nicolás Laprovíttola	Darío Brizuela †		Oriol Paulí †
PG	Tomáš Satoranský	Ricky Rubio †	Rokas Jokubaitis	Michael Caicedo ‡

Notes: Blue † – homegrown player; (Note: A homegrown player is a player that played for at least three years before the age of 20 on a Spanish team. In Liga ACB, the team must register at least four homegrown players in rosters of 10–12 players or at least three homegrown players in rosters of 8–9 players. In EuroLeague, the team did not have any limitations regarding the number of homegrown players.) Red * – overseas player; (Note: An overseas player is a player from outside EEA, FIBA Europe or ACP states. In Liga ACB, the team may register at most two overseas players. In EuroLeague, the team did not have any limitations regarding the number of overseas players.) Green ‡ – youth player (Note: In Liga ACB, the team may register under-22 players linked to the youth system. In EuroLeague, the team may register under-20 players linked to the youth system.)

=== On loan ===
Players out on loan
Nat.	Player	Position	Team	On loan since
(Spain)	Sergi Martínez	SF	(Spain) Girona	August 2023–June 2024
(Spain)	Rafa Villar	PG	(Spain) Lleida	August 2023–June 2024
(Uruguay)	Agustín Ubal	G/F	(Spain) Palencia	September 2023–June 2024
(Argentina)	Juani Marcos	PG	(Spain) Girona	August 2023–June 2024

=== Roster changes ===
==== In ====
No.	Pos.	Nat.	Name	Moving from		Type	Date	Source
44	F	(Spain)	Joel Parra	Joventut Badalona	(Spain)	Contract buyout	7 Jul 2023	
8	SG	(Spain)	Darío Brizuela	Unicaja Málaga	(Spain)	Contract buyout	13 Jul 2023	
14	C	(Spain)	Willy Hernangómez	New Orleans Pelicans	(United States)	End of contract	13 Jul 2023	
22	PF	(United States)	Jabari Parker	Boston Celtics	(United States)	End of contract	7 Aug 2023	
9	PG	(Spain)	Ricky Rubio	Cleveland Cavaliers	(United States)	End of contract	6 Feb 2024	

==== Out ====
No.	Pos.	Nat.	Name	Moving to		Type	Date	Source
24	SG	(United States)	Kyle Kuric	Zenit Saint Petersburg	(Russia)	End of contract	30 Jun 2023	
5	C	(Turkey)	Sertaç Şanlı	Fenerbahçe	(Turkey)	End of contract	30 Jun 2023	
23	F/C	(United States)	Mike Tobey	Crvena zvezda	(Serbia)	End of contract	30 Jun 2023	
33	F/C	(Spain)	Nikola Mirotić	Olimpia Milano	(Italy)	Contract termination	20 Jul 2023	
22	SG	(United States)	Cory Higgins	Free agent		Contract termination	1 Aug 2023	

== Pre-season and friendlies ==
=== Friendly matches ===
7 September 2023 Trofeu Orum	Força Lleida (Catalonia)	80–103	(Catalonia) FC Barcelona	Lleida
20:30	Scoring by quarter: 20–16, 23–28, 11–34, 26–25
	Pts: Kuath 14	Report	Pts: Laprovíttola 24	Arena: Pavelló Barris Nord

=== Lliga Catalana de Bàsquet ===
11 September 2023 Semifinal	FC Barcelona (Catalonia)	104–92	(Catalonia) Bàsquet Girona	Lleida
20:45	Scoring by quarter: 29–24, 17–27, 31–17, 27–24
	Pts: Laprovíttola 20	Report	Pts: Golomán 14	Arena: Pavelló Barris Nord

12 September 2023 Final	FC Barcelona (Catalonia)	81–79	(Catalonia) Baxi Manresa	Lleida
20:45	Scoring by quarter: 18–20, 16–27, 32–11, 15–21
	Pts: Veselý 13	Report	Pts: Badio 25	Arena: Pavelló Barris Nord

== Competitions ==
=== Overview ===
Competition	First match	Last match	Starting round	Final position	Record							
Competition	First match	Last match	Starting round	Final position	Pld	W	D	L	PF	PA	PD	Win %
Liga ACB	24 September 2023	2 June 2024	Round 1	Semi-finals	39	25		14	3,446	3,243	+203	64.10
EuroLeague	5 October 2023	8 May 2024	Round 1	Playoff series	39	24		15	3,152	3,064	+88	61.54
Copa del Rey	16 February 2024	18 February 2024	Quarter-finals	Finals	3	2		1	295	263	+32	66.67
Supercopa de España	16 September 2023	16 September 2023	Semi-finals	Semi-finals	1	0		1	80	90	−10	0.00
Total					82	51	0	31	6,973	6,660	+313	62.20

Last updated: 17 June 2025
Source: Competitions

=== Liga ACB ===
==== League table ====
Pos	Team	Pld	W	L	PF	PA	PD	Qualification or relegation
1	Unicaja	34	28	6	3016	2627	+389	Qualification to playoffs
2	Real Madrid	34	28	6	3001	2707	+294	Qualification to playoffs
3	Barça	34	23	11	2985	2769	+216	Qualification to playoffs
4	Valencia Basket	34	21	13	2856	2788	+68	Qualification to playoffs
5	UCAM Murcia	34	21	13	2829	2735	+94	Qualification to playoffs

Source: ACB
Rules for classification: 1) Win–loss record; 2) Head–to–head record; 3) Head–to–head point difference; 4) Point difference; 5) Points scored; 6) Sum of quotients of points scored (Note: Head–to–head record is used only after all the matches between the teams in question have been played)

==== Results summary ====
Overall						Home					Away				
Pld	W	L	PF	PA	PD	W	L	PF	PA	PD	W	L	PF	PA	PD
34	23	11	2985	2769	+216	13	4	1562	1388	+174	10	7	1423	1381	+42

Source: Competitive matches

==== Results by round ====
Round	1	2	3	4	5	6	7	8	9	10	11	12	13	14	15	16	17	18	19	20	21	22	23	24	25	26	27	28	29	30	31	32	33	34
Ground	H	A	A	H	A	H	A	A	H	A	H	H	A	H	H	A	H	A	A	H	H	A	H	A	H	A	A	H	A	H	A	H	H	A
Result	W	W	L	W	W	W	L	W	W	L	W	W	L	W	L	L	W	W	W	W	L	W	W	L	L	W	W	W	W	W	L	W	L	W
Position	5	4	7	6	3	2	3	2	2	4	4	3	3	3	3	3	3	3	3	3	3	3	3	3	3	3	3	3	3	3	3	3	3	3

Source: Competitive matches
A = Away; H = Home; W = Win; L = Loss; R = Rest

==== Matches ====
24 September 2023 1	FC Barcelona	95–79	Joventut	Barcelona
18:30	Scoring by quarter: 22–20, 22–20, 24–17, 27–22
	Pts: Parker 13; Rebs: Hernangómez 6 Asts: Jokubaitis 4 PIR: Kalinić 20	Boxscore	Pts: Andrews 15; Rebs: Brodziansky 5 Asts: Feliz 3 PIR: Brodziansky 15	Arena: Palau Blaugrana; Attendance: 6,644; Referees: Juan Carlos García González, Luis Miguel Castillo, Alberto Baena

29 September 2023 2	Zunder Palencia	83–84(OT)	FC Barcelona	Palencia
19:00	Scoring by quarter: 18–19, 7–15, 23–16, 24–22, Overtime: 11–12
	Pts: Brown 21; Rebs: N'Diaye 13; Asts: Brown, Benite 5 PIR: Brown 20	Boxscore	Pts: Hernangómez 21; Rebs: Hernangómez 10; Asts: Laprovíttola 7 PIR: Laprovíttola 26	Arena: Pabellón Municipal de Deportes; Attendance: 4,700; Referees: Miguel Ángel Pérez Pérez, Carlos Cortés, Fabio Fernández

1 October 2023 3	Real Madrid	86–79	FC Barcelona	Madrid
18:30	Scoring by quarter: 14–13, 23–20, 22–17, 27–29
	Pts: Poirier 22; Rebs: Diagne, Poirier 8 Asts: three players 5 PIR: Poirier 29	Boxscore	Pts: Brizuela 14; Rebs: Parra 8 Asts: three players 4 PIR: Jokubaitis 18	Arena: WiZink Center; Attendance: 11,235; Referees: Martín Caballero, Juan de Dios Oyón, Joaquín García

8 October 2023 4	FC Barcelona	91–87	MoraBanc Andorra	Barcelona
12:30	Scoring by quarter: 16–24, 21–23, 27–18, 27–22
	Pts: Laprovíttola 17; Rebs: Hernangómez 10; Asts: Satoranský 8 PIR: Satoranský 23	Boxscore	Pts: Okoye 21; Rebs: Llovet, Marić 8 Asts: Starks 8 PIR: Marić 23	Arena: Palau Blaugrana; Attendance: 4,966; Referees: Benjamín Jiménez, Arnau Padrós, Carlos Merino

15 October 2023 5	Dreamland Gran Canaria	73–83	FC Barcelona	Las Palmas
18:30	Scoring by quarter: 14–18, 23–14, 22–24, 14–27
	Pts: Brussino 18; Rebs: Lammers, Salvó 6 Asts: Albicy 9 PIR: Brussino 19	Boxscore	Pts: Jokubaitis 14; Rebs: Hernangómez 6 Asts: Jokubaitis 6 PIR: Jokubaitis 21	Arena: Gran Canaria Arena; Attendance: 8,102; Referees: Antonio Conde, Sergio Manuel, Vicente Martínez

22 October 2023 6	FC Barcelona	91–82	Surne Bilbao Basket	Barcelona
12:30	Scoring by quarter: 21–19, 26–20, 22–18, 22–25
	Pts: Hernangómez 20; Rebs: Hernangómez 7 Asts: Satoranský 9 PIR: Hernangómez 26	Boxscore	Pts: Smith 20; Rebs: Hlinason 6 Asts: Smith, Renfroe 3 PIR: Smith 22	Arena: Palau Blaugrana; Attendance: 5,360; Referees: Óscar Perea, Joaquín García, Roberto Lucas

29 October 2023 7	Valencia Basket	71–68	FC Barcelona	Valencia
18:30	Scoring by quarter: 18–19, 27–14, 13–16, 13–19
	Pts: Jones 17; Rebs: Claver, Davies 5 Asts: Jović 4 PIR: Jones 19	Boxscore	Pts: Hernangómez 22; Rebs: Hernangómez, Kalinić 8 Asts: Satoranský 7 PIR: Kalinić 30	Arena: La Fonteta; Attendance: 7,972; Referees: Juan Carlos García González, Luis Miguel Castillo, Alfonso Olivares

5 November 2023 8	Río Breogán	63–79	FC Barcelona	Lugo
17:00	Scoring by quarter: 19–21, 12–18, 20–19, 12–21
	Pts: Sajus 15; Rebs: three players 3 Asts: Jogėla 5 PIR: Sajus 17	Boxscore	Pts: Veselý 14; Rebs: Veselý 7 Asts: Satoranský 7 PIR: Veselý 24	Arena: Pazo dos Deportes; Attendance: 5,269; Referees: Carlos Peruga, Javier Torres, Alberto Baena

12 November 2023 9	FC Barcelona	94–83	Lenovo Tenerife	Barcelona
18:30	Scoring by quarter: 21–19, 19–16, 22–23, 32–25
	Pts: Parker 18; Rebs: Veselý 7 Asts: Veselý 7 PIR: Parker 20	Boxscore	Pts: Cook 18; Rebs: Ristić, Abromaitis 4 Asts: Huertas 8 PIR: Huertas 21	Arena: Palau Blaugrana; Attendance: 4,302; Referees: Fernando Calatrava, Carlos Cortés, Sergio Manuel

19 November 2023 10	UCAM Murcia	82–73	FC Barcelona	Murcia
18:30	Scoring by quarter: 23–20, 12–18, 23–24, 24–11
	Pts: Ennis 19; Rebs: Birgander 8 Asts: Ennis 5 PIR: Birgander 21	Boxscore	Pts: Hernangómez 15; Rebs: Satoranský, Parra 5 Asts: Jokubaitis, Laprovíttola 4 PIR: Satoranský 17	Arena: Palacio de Deportes; Attendance: 6,860; Referees: Benjamín Jiménez, Francisco Araña, Iyán González

11 November 2023 11	FC Barcelona	115–78	Bàsquet Girona	Barcelona
17:00	Scoring by quarter: 26–14, 25–23, 33–18, 31–23
	Pts: Brizuela, Hernangómez 20; Rebs: Hernangómez 10; Asts: Paulí 7 PIR: Hernangómez 36	Boxscore	Pts: Vila 17; Rebs: Iroegbu 5 Asts: Iroegbu 6 PIR: Iroegbu 11	Arena: Palau Blaugrana; Attendance: 5,504; Referees: Rafael Serrano, Alberto Sánchez Sixto, Esperanza Mendoza

3 December 2023 12	FC Barcelona	80–69	Covirán Granada	Barcelona
17:00	Scoring by quarter: 11–15, 24–16, 19–23, 26–15
	Pts: Jokubaitis 20; Rebs: Hernangómez, Jokubaitis 5 Asts: Satoranský 5 PIR: Jokubaitis 25	Boxscore	Pts: Cheatham 17; Rebs: Felício 13; Asts: Costa 6 PIR: Felício 25	Arena: Palau Blaugrana; Attendance: 3,592; Referees: Miguel Ángel Pérez Pérez, Jorge Martínez, Alberto Baena

10 December 2023 13	Casademont Zaragoza	101–99	FC Barcelona	Zaragoza
18:30	Scoring by quarter: 21–18, 27–26, 33–31, 20–24
	Pts: Watt 22; Rebs: Gielo 6 Asts: Bell-Haynes 13; PIR: Bell-Haynes 31	Boxscore	Pts: Parker 23; Rebs: Hernangómez 8 Asts: Laprovíttola 9 PIR: Laprovíttola 25	Arena: Pabellón Príncipe Felipe; Attendance: 5,510; Referees: Antonio Conde, Jordi Aliaga, David Sánchez

17 December 2023 14	FC Barcelona	82–62	Baskonia	Barcelona
18:00	Scoring by quarter: 17–19, 20–14, 19–11, 26–18
	Pts: Hernangómez, Parker 14; Rebs: Parra 6 Asts: Jokubaitis, Satoranský 4 PIR: Parker 20	Boxscore	Pts: Howard 20; Rebs: Kotsar, Moneke 8 Asts: Miller-McIntyre 3 PIR: Howard 18	Arena: Palau Blaugrana; Attendance: 5,219; Referees: Carlos Peruga, Javier Torres, Cristóbal Sánchez

13 December 2023 15	FC Barcelona	82–83	Baxi Manresa	Barcelona
20:30	Scoring by quarter: 14–24, 22–15, 24–26, 22–18
	Pts: Brizuela 17; Rebs: Satoranský 6 Asts: Jokubaitis 3 PIR: Laprovíttola 15	Boxscore	Pts: Šteinbergs 15; Rebs: three players 6 Asts: García 9 PIR: three players 17	Arena: Palau Blaugrana; Attendance: 3,286; Referees: Alfonso Olivares, Joaquín García, Fabio Fernández

27 December 2023 16	Unicaja	91–71	FC Barcelona	Málaga
21:00	Scoring by quarter: 19–26, 29–11, 21–23, 22–11
	Pts: Thomas 16; Rebs: Osetkowski, Taylor 6 Asts: Taylor 5 PIR: Thomas 24	Boxscore	Pts: Parra, Veselý 11; Rebs: Hernangómez 8 Asts: Satoranský 7 PIR: Veselý 15	Arena: Martín Carpena; Attendance: 10,681; Referees: Emilio Pérez Pizarro, Rafael Serrano, Rubén Sánchez Mohedas

7 January 2024 17	FC Barcelona	92–90	Monbus Obradoiro	Barcelona
17:00	Scoring by quarter: 17–25, 25–17, 32–19, 23–23
	Pts: Hernangómez 23; Rebs: Hernangómez 13; Asts: Laprovíttola 9 PIR: Hernangómez 30	Boxscore	Pts: Howard 20; Rebs: Scrubb 9 Asts: three players 3 PIR: Howard 18	Arena: Palau Blaugrana; Attendance: 5,836; Referees: Martín Caballero, Raúl Zamorano, Iyán González

14 January 2024 18	Lenovo Tenerife	80–83	FC Barcelona	San Cristóbal de La Laguna
18:00	Scoring by quarter: 20–24, 19–15, 25–24, 16–20
	Pts: Shermadini 22; Rebs: Shermadini 8 Asts: Huertas 7 PIR: Shermadini 23	Boxscore	Pts: Brizuela 16; Rebs: Hernangómez 5 Asts: Jokubaitis 6 PIR: Brizuela, Veselý 14	Arena: Santiago Martín; Attendance: 5,153; Referees: Óscar Perea, Joaquín García, Fabio Fernández

21 January 2024 19	Covirán Granada	61–94	FC Barcelona	Granada
12:30	Scoring by quarter: 16–19, 16–23, 15–25, 14–27
	Pts: Cheatham 20; Rebs: Cheatham 6 Asts: Rousselle 5 PIR: Cheatham 14	Boxscore	Pts: Hernangómez 20; Rebs: Hernangómez 9 Asts: Kalinić, Jokubaitis 4 PIR: Hernangómez 19	Arena: Palacio de Deportes; Attendance: 7,906; Referees: Carlos Cortés, Jordi Aliaga, Carlos Merino

28 January 2024 20	FC Barcelona	102–94	Zunder Palencia	Barcelona
18:30	Scoring by quarter: 29–16, 23–27, 18–25, 32–26
	Pts: Parker 18; Rebs: Hernangómez 7 Asts: Jokubaitis 6 PIR: Satoranský 18	Boxscore	Pts: Pasečņiks 26; Rebs: Ortega 7 Asts: van der Vuurst 11; PIR: Pasečņiks 25	Arena: Palau Blaugrana; Attendance: 5,521; Referees: Emilio Pérez Pizarro, Jorge Martínez, Yasmina Alcaraz

4 February 2024 21	FC Barcelona	76–79	Valencia Basket	Barcelona
18:30	Scoring by quarter: 19–19, 21–19, 18–22, 18–19
	Pts: Hernangómez 16; Rebs: Hernangómez 9 Asts: Satoranský 7 PIR: Hernangómez 25	Boxscore	Pts: Ojeleye 17; Rebs: Jović 7 Asts: Jones 7 PIR: Ojeleye 20	Arena: Palau Blaugrana; Attendance: 6,706; Referees: Miguel Ángel Pérez Pérez, Rafael Serrano, Alberto Sánchez Sixto

11 February 2024 22	Baxi Manresa	77–87	FC Barcelona	Manresa
18:30	Scoring by quarter: 19–27, 19–20, 23–17, 16–23
	Pts: Robinson 15; Rebs: Vaulet 6 Asts: Pérez 5 PIR: Vaulet 15	Boxscore	Pts: Parker 16; Rebs: Hernangómez 9 Asts: Satoranský 5 PIR: Satoranský 24	Arena: Nou Congost; Attendance: 5,000; Referees: Benjamín Jiménez, Alfonso Olivares, Cristóbal Sánchez

3 March 2024 23	FC Barcelona	109–68	Casademont Zaragoza	Barcelona
18:30	Scoring by quarter: 21–16, 29–18, 29–20, 30–14
	Pts: Hernangómez 23; Rebs: Hernangómez 14; Asts: Jokubaitis 8 PIR: Hernangómez 44	Boxscore	Pts: Kravić 18; Rebs: three players 6 Asts: Yusta 4 PIR: Kravić 20	Arena: Palau Blaugrana; Attendance: 6,588; Referees: Jordi Aliaga, Sergio Manuel, Rubén Sánchez Mohedas

10 March 2024 24	Baskonia	103–96	FC Barcelona	Vitoria-Gasteiz
18:30	Scoring by quarter: 23–19, 27–23, 32–28, 21–26
	Pts: Howard 37; Rebs: Sedekerskis 11; Asts: Theodore 5 PIR: Costello 29	Boxscore	Pts: Parker 21; Rebs: Hernangómez 7 Asts: Laprovíttola 4 PIR: Parker 24	Arena: Buesa Arena; Attendance: 13,338; Referees: Fernando Calatrava, Martín Caballero, Javier Torres

17 March 2024 25	FC Barcelona	85–88	Río Breogán	Barcelona
12:30	Scoring by quarter: 23–26, 24–20, 25–21, 13–21
	Pts: Hernangómez 20; Rebs: Hernangómez 9 Asts: Brizuela 5 PIR: Hernangómez 29	Boxscore	Pts: García 23; Rebs: Jogėla 6 Asts: García 5 PIR: García 28	Arena: Palau Blaugrana; Attendance: 5,386; Referees: Juan Carlos García González, Juan de Dios Oyón, Guillermo Ríos

24 March 2024 26	Joventut	75–93	FC Barcelona	Badalona
18:30	Scoring by quarter: 21–28, 19–17, 15–25, 20–23
	Pts: Brodziansky 18; Rebs: Brodziansky, Prey 9 Asts: Evans 3 PIR: Brodziansky 23	Boxscore	Pts: Brizuela 18; Rebs: Parker 8 Asts: Rubio, Satoranský 4 PIR: Rubio 19	Arena: Palau Municipal d'Esports; Attendance: 12,193; Referees: Carlos Peruga, Luis Miguel Castillo, Andrés Fernández

31 March 2024 27	Monbus Obradoiro	84–89	FC Barcelona	Santiago de Compostela
18:30	Scoring by quarter: 15–25, 29–21, 24–16, 16–27
	Pts: Scrubb 24; Rebs: Scrubb 7 Asts: Howard 5 PIR: Scrubb 28	Boxscore	Pts: Laprovíttola 21; Rebs: Veselý 7 Asts: Satoranský 6 PIR: Silva, Veselý 19	Arena: Pavillón Fontes do Sar; Attendance: 5,500; Referees: Óscar Perea, Alberto Sánchez Sixto, Roberto Lucas

7 April 2024 28	FC Barcelona	85–79	Real Madrid	Barcelona
18:30	Scoring by quarter: 27–11, 18–22, 19–25, 21–21
	Pts: Laprovíttola 25; Rebs: Veselý 8 Asts: Laprovíttola, Satoranský 5 PIR: Laprovíttola 23	Boxscore	Pts: Deck, Musa 14; Rebs: Deck 13; Asts: Campazzo 6 PIR: Deck 25	Arena: Palau Blaugrana; Attendance: 7,726; Referees: Carlos Peruga, Martín Caballero, Francisco Araña

14 April 2024 29	Bàsquet Girona	75–81	FC Barcelona	Girona
17:00	Scoring by quarter: 12–26, 19–11, 24–24, 20–20
	Pts: Iroegbu 25; Rebs: Pons 10; Asts: Marcos 5 PIR: Iroegbu 21	Boxscore	Pts: Parker 20; Rebs: Parker 8 Asts: Rubio 4 PIR: Parker 27	Arena: Fontajau; Attendance: 5,269; Referees: Miguel Ángel Pérez Pérez, Jorge Martínez, Andrés Fernández

20 April 2024 30	FC Barcelona	97–86	UCAM Murcia	Barcelona
20:45	Scoring by quarter: 21–22, 26–18, 32–28, 18–18
	Pts: Veselý 20; Rebs: three players 4 Asts: Laprovíttola 7 PIR: Veselý 22	Boxscore	Pts: Ennis 16; Rebs: Radović 6 Asts: Caupain, Radović 3 PIR: Todorović 19	Arena: Palau Blaugrana; Attendance: 6,590; Referees: Antonio Conde, Arnau Padrós, Guillermo Ríos

28 April 2024 31	MoraBanc Andorra	108–92	FC Barcelona	Andorra la Vella
18:30	Scoring by quarter: 28–24, 27–19, 20–31, 33–18
	Pts: Harding 20; Rebs: Marić 8 Asts: Luz 8 PIR: Luz 21	Boxscore	Pts: Parra 22; Rebs: Hernangómez 8 Asts: Laprovíttola 5 PIR: Parra 24	Arena: Pavelló de Govern; Attendance: 4,827; Referees: Jordi Aliaga, Luis Miguel Castillo, Raúl Zamorano

5 May 2024 32	FC Barcelona	95–89(OT)	Dreamland Gran Canaria	Barcelona
17:00	Scoring by quarter: 16–17, 17–20, 17–28, 30–15, Overtime: 15–9
	Pts: Laprovíttola 29; Rebs: Satoranský 8 Asts: Satoranský 6 PIR: Laprovíttola 25	Boxscore	Pts: Happ 24; Rebs: Happ, Pelos 7 Asts: four players 4 PIR: Happ 29	Arena: Palau Blaugrana; Attendance: 5,867; Referees: Emilio Pérez Pizarro, Fabio Fernández, Vicente Martínez

10 May 2024 33	FC Barcelona	91–92	Unicaja	Barcelona
19:00	Scoring by quarter: 27–20, 20–24, 19–23, 25–25
	Pts: Parker 22; Rebs: three players 4 Asts: Satoranský 6 PIR: Parker 20	Boxscore	Pts: Carter 16; Rebs: Kravish, Osetkowski 7 Asts: Perry 6 PIR: Osetkowski, Thomas 16	Arena: Palau Blaugrana; Attendance: 4,476; Referees: Juan Carlos García González, Carlos Cortés, Sergio Manuel

12 May 2024 34	Surne Bilbao Basket	68–72	FC Barcelona	Bilbao
18:30	Scoring by quarter: 19–24, 18–14, 10–18, 21–16
	Pts: Killeya-Jones 21; Rebs: Hlinason 8 Asts: Rabaseda 3 PIR: Killeya-Jones 21	Boxscore	Pts: da Silva 20; Rebs: three players 6 Asts: Jokubaitis 6 PIR: da Silva 23	Arena: Bilbao Arena; Attendance: 9,204; Referees: Rafael Serrano, Francisco Araña, Roberto Lucas

=== ACB Playoffs ===
==== Quarterfinals ====
19 May 2024 1	Barça	96–86	Lenovo Tenerife	Barcelona
12:30	Scoring by quarter: 28–16, 22–30, 22–26, 24–14
	Pts: Parker 23; Rebs: Parra 7 Asts: Rubio 10; PIR: Parker 26	Boxscore	Pts: Guy 34; Rebs: Guerra 9 Asts: Huertas 10; PIR: Guy 29	Arena: Palau Blaugrana; Attendance: 6,033; Referees: Benjamín Jiménez, Luis Miguel Castillo, Yasmina Alcaraz

23 May 2024 2	Lenovo Tenerife	92–97	Barça	San Cristóbal de La Laguna
20:30	Scoring by quarter: 21–22, 25–22, 25–28, 21–25
	Pts: Fitipaldo 20; Rebs: Abromaitis 10; Asts: Fitipaldo 7 PIR: Fitipaldo 20	Boxscore	Pts: Satoranský 24; Rebs: Veselý 5 Asts: Veselý, Jokubaitis 4 PIR: Satoranský 28	Arena: Santiago Martín; Attendance: 5,121; Referees: Antonio Conde, Alfonso Olivares, Cristóbal Sánchez

==== Semifinals ====
29 May 2024 1	Real Madrid	97–78	Barça	Madrid
20:30	Scoring by quarter: 24–14, 20–22, 28–26, 25–16
	Pts: Campazzo 20; Rebs: Tavares 15; Asts: Campazzo 10; PIR: Tavares 35	Boxscore	Pts: Laprovíttola 13; Rebs: da Silva 7 Asts: Rubio 10; PIR: Rubio 22	Arena: WiZink Center; Attendance: 11,274; Referees: Carlos Peruga, Jordi Aliaga, Luis Miguel Castillo

31 May 2024 2	Real Madrid	104–98	Barça	Madrid
20:30	Scoring by quarter: 22–24, 22–16, 29–22, 31–36
	Pts: Llull, Musa 18; Rebs: Tavares 9 Asts: Hezonja 6 PIR: Hezonja 23	Boxscore	Pts: Veselý 24; Rebs: Rubio 5 Asts: Satoranský 11; PIR: Satoranský 26	Arena: WiZink Center; Attendance: 12,025; Referees: Emilio Pérez Pizarro, Fernando Calatrava, Alberto Sánchez Sixto

2 June 2024 3	Barça	92–95	Real Madrid	Barcelona
18:30	Scoring by quarter: 20–28, 25–21, 31–23, 16–23
	Pts: Parker 27; Rebs: Hernangómez 8 Asts: Laprovíttola 9 PIR: Parker 26	Boxscore	Pts: Campazzo 21; Rebs: Tavares, Yabusele 5 Asts: Musa 7 PIR: Campazzo 27	Arena: Palau Blaugrana; Attendance: 7,066; Referees: Antonio Conde, Javier Torres, Alfonso Olivares

=== EuroLeague ===
==== League table ====
Pos	Team	Pld	W	L	PF	PA	PD	Qualification
2	(Hellenic Basketball Federation) Panathinaikos AKTOR	34	23	11	2752	2580	+172	Qualification to playoffs
3	(French Federation of Basketball) AS Monaco	34	23	11	2770	2671	+99	Qualification to playoffs
4	(Spanish Basketball Federation) Barcelona	34	22	12	2812	2692	+120	Qualification to playoffs
5	(Hellenic Basketball Federation) Olympiacos	34	22	12	2658	2538	+120	Qualification to playoffs
6	(Turkish Basketball Federation) Fenerbahçe Beko	34	20	14	2855	2723	+132	Qualification to playoffs

Source: EuroLeague
Rules for classification: All points scored in extra period(s) were not counted in the standings, nor for any tie-break situation.

==== Results summary ====
Overall						Home					Away				
Pld	W	L	PF	PA	PD	W	L	PF	PA	PD	W	L	PF	PA	PD
34	22	12	2812	2692	+120	15	2	1484	1309	+175	7	10	1328	1383	−55

Last updated: 10 April 2025.
Source: Competitive matches

==== Results by round ====
Round	1	2	3	4	5	6	7	8	9	10	11	12	13	14	15	16	17	18	19	20	21	22	23	24	25	26	27	28	29	30	31	32	33	34
Ground	H	A	A	H	A	H	H	A	H	A	H	A	H	H	A	A	A	H	H	H	H	A	A	H	A	H	H	A	H	A	A	A	H	A
Result	W	W	W	W	L	W	W	L	W	W	W	L	W	L	L	W	L	W	W	W	W	L	L	W	W	W	L	W	W	L	L	W	W	L
Position	2	1	2	1	2	2	2	2	2	2	2	2	2	2	3	2	3	3	3	2	2	2	2	2	2	2	2	2	2	2	4	4	4	4

Source: Competitive matches
A = Away; H = Home; W = Win; L = Loss; P = Postponed

==== Matches ====
5 October 2023 1	Barcelona (Spanish Basketball Federation)	91–74	(Turkish Basketball Federation) Anadolu Efes	Barcelona
20:30	Scoring by quarter: 22–19, 18–15, 29–30, 22–10
	Pts: Hernangómez 18; Rebs: Veselý 7 Asts: Laprovíttola 8 PIR: Hernangómez 24	Boxscore	Pts: Larkin 16; Rebs: Willis 6 Asts: Larkin 12; PIR: Larkin 26	Arena: Palau Blaugrana; Attendance: 5,577; Referees: Sreten Radović, Mehdi Difallah, Milivoje Jovčić

13 October 2023 2	Olympiacos (Hellenic Basketball Federation)	68–77	(Spanish Basketball Federation) Barcelona	Piraeus
20:15	Scoring by quarter: 16–23, 18–17, 20–16, 14–21
	Pts: Walkup 14; Rebs: three players 4 Asts: three players 3 PIR: Milutinov 18	Boxscore	Pts: Laprovíttola 17; Rebs: Hernangómez 7 Asts: Laprovíttola 7 PIR: Laprovíttola 22	Arena: Peace and Friendship Stadium; Attendance: 12,219; Referees: Saša Pukl, Gytis Vilius, Sérgio Silva

17 October 2023 3	Partizan Mozzart Bet (Basketball Federation of Serbia)	83–92	(Spanish Basketball Federation) Barcelona	Belgrade
18:30	Scoring by quarter: 16–23, 18–21, 26–25, 23–23
	Pts: Nunnally 14; Rebs: LeDay 5 Asts: Dozier 5 PIR: LeDay 17	Boxscore	Pts: Laprovíttola 20; Rebs: Parker 11; Asts: Laprovíttola, Satoranský 6 PIR: Laprovíttola, Veselý 22	Arena: Štark Arena; Attendance: 19,227; Referees: Fernando Rocha, Piotr Pastusiak, Artūras Šukys

20 October 2023 4	Barcelona (Spanish Basketball Federation)	98–59	(German Basketball Federation) Bayern Munich	Barcelona
20:30	Scoring by quarter: 27–11, 16–16, 27–13, 28–19
	Pts: Parker 15; Rebs: Hernangómez 7 Asts: Laprovíttola 6 PIR: Veselý 18	Boxscore	Pts: Ibaka 13; Rebs: Ibaka 8 Asts: four players 2 PIR: Francisco 13	Arena: Palau Blaugrana; Attendance: 6,519; Referees: Tomislav Hordov, Eduard Udyanskyy, Uroš Obrknežević

26 October 2023 5	Real Madrid (Spanish Basketball Federation)	65–64	(Spanish Basketball Federation) Barcelona	Madrid
20:45	Scoring by quarter: 12–19, 16–11, 23–11, 14–23
	Pts: Deck 20; Rebs: Hezonja 10; Asts: Campazzo 7 PIR: Deck 20	Boxscore	Pts: Hernangómez 13; Rebs: Veselý 10; Asts: Jokubaitis 4 PIR: Veselý 18	Arena: WiZink Center; Attendance: 11,432; Referees: Ilija Belošević, Milan Nedović, Luka Kardum

3 November 2023 6	Barcelona (Spanish Basketball Federation)	80–72	(Hellenic Basketball Federation) Panathinaikos	Barcelona
20:30	Scoring by quarter: 21–20, 24–13, 26–14, 9–25
	Pts: Parker 17; Rebs: Satoranský 7 Asts: Kalinić, Satoranský 3 PIR: Parker, Satoranský 17	Boxscore	Pts: Grant 15; Rebs: Mitoglou 6 Asts: Moraitis 4 PIR: Balcerowski 17	Arena: Palau Blaugrana; Attendance: 7,225; Referees: Sreten Radović, Oļegs Latiševs, Joseph Bissang

10 November 2023 7	Barcelona (Spanish Basketball Federation)	86–81	(Basketball Federation of Serbia) Crvena zvezda Meridianbet	Barcelona
20:30	Scoring by quarter: 21–18, 26–25, 18–19, 21–19
	Pts: Parker 20; Rebs: three players 5 Asts: Satoranský 6 PIR: Parker, Satoranský 19	Boxscore	Pts: Mitrović 22; Rebs: Bolomboy 9 Asts: Teodosić 9 PIR: Mitrović 19	Arena: Palau Blaugrana; Attendance: 5,473; Referees: Damir Javor, Carmelo Paternicò, Robert Vyklický

15 November 2023 8	Baskonia (Spanish Basketball Federation)	94–71	(Spanish Basketball Federation) Barcelona	Vitoria-Gasteiz
20:30	Scoring by quarter: 26–18, 29–11, 15–24, 24–18
	Pts: Howard 26; Rebs: Sedekerskis 12; Asts: Miller-McIntyre 7 PIR: Miller-McIntyre 29	Boxscore	Pts: Laprovíttola 14; Rebs: Parra 7 Asts: Laprovíttola, Brizuela 4 PIR: Laprovíttola, da Silva 14	Arena: Buesa Arena; Attendance: 10,033; Referees: Emin Moğulkoç, Sašo Petek, Maxime Boubert

17 November 2023 9	Barcelona (Spanish Basketball Federation)	74–70	(Spanish Basketball Federation) Valencia Basket	Barcelona
20:30	Scoring by quarter: 25–16, 12–17, 17–19, 20–18
	Pts: Veselý 17; Rebs: Parker 7 Asts: Laprovíttola 5 PIR: Veselý 20	Boxscore	Pts: Jones 15; Rebs: López-Arostegui 7 Asts: three players 2 PIR: López-Arostegui, Toure 10	Arena: Palau Blaugrana; Attendance: 5,128; Referees: Fernando Rocha, Igor Dragojević, Steve Bittner

23 November 2023 10	Maccabi Playtika Tel Aviv (Israeli Basketball Association)	90–92	(Spanish Basketball Federation) Barcelona	Belgrade (Note: From 24 October onwards, Maccabi Playtika Tel Aviv will play their home matches in Belgrade due to the inability to host matches in Israel as a result of the Gaza war until further notice.)
20:05	Scoring by quarter: 31–26, 20–25, 17–19, 22–22
	Pts: Baldwin 19; Rebs: Colson 7 Asts: Baldwin 8 PIR: Baldwin 22	Boxscore	Pts: Laprovíttola 23; Rebs: Hernangómez 8 Asts: Satoranský 4 PIR: Laprovíttola 19	Arena: Aleksandar Nikolić Hall; Attendance: 0 Referees: Mehdi Difallah, Milan Nedović, Hugues Thépénier

30 November 2023 11	Barcelona (Spanish Basketball Federation)	101–92	(French Federation of Basketball) LDLC ASVEL	Barcelona
18:45	Scoring by quarter: 28–24, 22–23, 28–24, 23–21
	Pts: Laprovíttola 28; Rebs: Parker 6 Asts: Laprovíttola 9 PIR: Laprovíttola 31	Boxscore	Pts: Luwawu-Cabarrot 20; Rebs: Fall 7 Asts: Lee 7 PIR: Luwawu-Cabarrot 21	Arena: Palau Blaugrana; Attendance: 4,612; Referees: Tomislav Hordov, Gytis Vilius, Robert Vyklický

6 December 2023 12	Virtus Segafredo Bologna (Italian Basketball Federation)	80–75	(Spanish Basketball Federation) Barcelona	Bologna
20:30	Scoring by quarter: 18–24, 15–21, 23–16, 24–14
	Pts: Lundberg 21; Rebs: Shengelia 9 Asts: Hackett 6 PIR: Lundberg 21	Boxscore	Pts: Hernangómez 15; Rebs: Veselý 6 Asts: Laprovíttola 8 PIR: Hernangómez 18	Arena: Segafredo Arena; Attendance: 8,299; Referees: Robert Lottermoser, Ioannis Foufis, Maxime Boubert

8 December 2023 13	Barcelona (Spanish Basketball Federation)	89–81	(Turkish Basketball Federation) Fenerbahçe Beko	Barcelona
20:30	Scoring by quarter: 16–19, 22–31, 25–14, 26–17
	Pts: Hernangómez 21; Rebs: Hernangómez 9 Asts: Satoranský 6 PIR: Hernangómez 26	Boxscore	Pts: Hayes-Davis 18; Rebs: Pierre 6 Asts: Dorsey 7 PIR: Dorsey 18	Arena: Palau Blaugrana; Attendance: 6,787; Referees: Damir Javor, Milivoje Jovčić, Artūras Šukys

15 December 2023 14	Barcelona (Spanish Basketball Federation)	86–90	(Italian Basketball Federation) EA7 Emporio Armani Milan	Barcelona
20:30	Scoring by quarter: 19–29, 21–22, 19–17, 27–22
	Pts: Kalinić 17; Rebs: Hernangómez 6 Asts: Laprovíttola 5 PIR: Veselý 19	Boxscore	Pts: Hall 21; Rebs: Melli 6 Asts: Melli 3 PIR: Melli 24	Arena: Palau Blaugrana; Attendance: 4,588; Referees: Ilija Belošević, Anne Panther, Kristaps Konstantinovs

19 December 2023 15	ALBA Berlin (German Basketball Federation)	74–70	(Spanish Basketball Federation) Barcelona	Berlin
20:00	Scoring by quarter: 19–22, 19–19, 18–11, 18–18
	Pts: Thomas 13; Rebs: Koumadje, Thiemann 7 Asts: Delow 6 PIR: Thiemann 14	Boxscore	Pts: Laprovíttola 15; Rebs: Satoranský 10; Asts: three players 4 PIR: Satoranský 14	Arena: Mercedes-Benz Arena; Attendance: 10,592; Referees: Gytis Vilius, Saulius Račys, Guido Giovannetti

22 December 2023 16	Žalgiris (Lithuanian Basketball Federation)	80–85	(Spanish Basketball Federation) Barcelona	Kaunas
19:00	Scoring by quarter: 22–28, 29–28, 22–14, 7–15
	Pts: Birutis 18; Rebs: Šmits 7 Asts: Dimša 4 PIR: Ulanovas, Birutis 20	Boxscore	Pts: Laprovíttola 18; Rebs: Kalinić, Parker 8 Asts: Kalinić, Satoranský 6 PIR: Veselý 22	Arena: Žalgirio Arena; Attendance: 14,953; Referees: Carmelo Paternicò, Sašo Petek, Hugues Thépénier

29 December 2023 17	AS Monaco (French Federation of Basketball)	91–71	(Spanish Basketball Federation) Barcelona	Fontvieille
21:00	Scoring by quarter: 27–15, 20–21, 20–16, 24–19
	Pts: James 20; Rebs: Hall 6 Asts: James 5 PIR: Diallo, James 23	Boxscore	Pts: Parker 15; Rebs: Hernangómez 6 Asts: Satoranský 4 PIR: Parker 14	Arena: Salle Gaston Médecin; Attendance: 5,000; Referees: Fernando Rocha, Luka Kardum, Adar Peer

3 January 2024 18	Barcelona (Spanish Basketball Federation)	83–78	(Spanish Basketball Federation) Real Madrid	Barcelona
21:00	Scoring by quarter: 21–25, 24–22, 15–15, 23–16
	Pts: Veselý 27; Rebs: Satoranský, Hernangómez 6 Asts: Laprovíttola 8 PIR: Veselý 28	Boxscore	Pts: Musa 19; Rebs: Tavares 7 Asts: Campazzo 8 PIR: Musa 24	Arena: Palau Blaugrana; Attendance: 7,611; Referees: Emin Moğulkoç, Mehdi Difallah, Kristaps Konstantinovs

5 January 2024 19	Barcelona (Spanish Basketball Federation)	89–85	(Spanish Basketball Federation) Baskonia	Barcelona
20:30	Scoring by quarter: 24–23, 23–19, 15–26, 27–17
	Pts: Veselý 23; Rebs: Satoranský 9 Asts: Laprovíttola 8 PIR: Veselý 28	Boxscore	Pts: Howard 21; Rebs: Sedekerskis 6 Asts: Miller-McIntyre 7 PIR: Sedekerskis 20	Arena: Palau Blaugrana; Attendance: 4,971; Referees: Damir Javor, Miloš Koljenšić, Leandro Lezcano

10 January 2024 20	Barcelona (Spanish Basketball Federation)	86–78	(Hellenic Basketball Federation) Olympiacos	Barcelona
20:30	Scoring by quarter: 27–20, 17–21, 31–22, 11–15
	Pts: Parker 21; Rebs: Hernangómez 5 Asts: Satoranský 5 PIR: Hernangómez 23	Boxscore	Pts: Peters 22; Rebs: Milutinov 8 Asts: Williams-Goss 5 PIR: Peters 16	Arena: Palau Blaugrana; Attendance: 6,053; Referees: Matej Boltauzer, Milivoje Jovčić, Jakub Zamojski

12 January 2024 21	Barcelona (Spanish Basketball Federation)	91–73	(Lithuanian Basketball Federation) Žalgiris	Barcelona
20:30	Scoring by quarter: 26–12, 18–25, 24–20, 23–16
	Pts: Brizuela 24; Rebs: Hernangómez 8 Asts: Kalinić 5 PIR: Brizuela 23	Boxscore	Pts: Sumner 15; Rebs: Manek 6 Asts: Evans 5 PIR: Evans 15	Arena: Palau Blaugrana; Attendance: 6,655; Referees: Carmelo Paternicò, Igor Dragojević, Hugues Thépénier

18 January 2024 22	Anadolu Efes (Turkish Basketball Federation)	98–74	(Spanish Basketball Federation) Barcelona	Istanbul
18:30	Scoring by quarter: 18–13, 24–26, 30–21, 26–14
	Pts: Beaubois 21; Rebs: Pleiß, Willis 7 Asts: Larkin 8 PIR: Larkin 23	Boxscore	Pts: Hernangómez 18; Rebs: Parker 6 Asts: Satoranský, Jokubaitis 5 PIR: Hernangómez 15	Arena: Sinan Erdem Dome; Attendance: 15,124; Referees: Tomislav Hordov, Ioannis Foufis, Vasiliki Tsaroucha

26 January 2024 23	EA7 Emporio Armani Milan (Italian Basketball Federation)	74–70	(Spanish Basketball Federation) Barcelona	Assago
20:30	Scoring by quarter: 23–12, 24–16, 10–21, 17–21
	Pts: Shields 23; Rebs: Melli 7 Asts: Napier, Shields 5 PIR: Shields 26	Boxscore	Pts: Veselý 28; Rebs: Kalinić 10; Asts: Jokubaitis 6 PIR: Veselý 29	Arena: Forum; Attendance: 11,516; Referees: Mehdi Difallah, Milan Nedović, Josip Radojković

31 January 2024 24	Barcelona (Spanish Basketball Federation)	84–57	(Italian Basketball Federation) Virtus Segafredo Bologna	Barcelona
20:30	Scoring by quarter: 20–17, 21–10, 20–17, 23–13
	Pts: Hernangómez 17; Rebs: Veselý 13; Asts: Satoranský 7 PIR: Hernangómez 20	Boxscore	Pts: Cordinier 12; Rebs: Cordinier 5 Asts: three players 2 PIR: Cordinier 14	Arena: Palau Blaugrana; Attendance: 6,588; Referees: Ilija Belošević, Uroš Nikolić, Gentian Cici

2 February 2024 25	Crvena zvezda Meridianbet (Basketball Federation of Serbia)	76–85	(Spanish Basketball Federation) Barcelona	Belgrade
20:00	Scoring by quarter: 17–18, 15–27, 19–19, 25–21
	Pts: Nedović 21; Rebs: Bolomboy 10; Asts: dos Santos 7 PIR: Bolomboy 21	Boxscore	Pts: Brizuela 20; Rebs: Veselý 8 Asts: Satoranský 6 PIR: Brizuela 22	Arena: Štark Arena; Attendance: 20,875; Referees: Fernando Rocha, Saulius Račys, Kristaps Konstantinovs

9 February 2024 26	Barcelona (Spanish Basketball Federation)	93–77	(German Basketball Federation) ALBA Berlin	Barcelona
20:30	Scoring by quarter: 31–26, 20–13, 29–12, 13–26
	Pts: Hernangómez 18; Rebs: da Silva 10; Asts: Kalinić 5 PIR: Hernangómez 26	Boxscore	Pts: Schneider 14; Rebs: Spagnolo 5 Asts: three players 2 PIR: Schneider 14	Arena: Palau Blaugrana; Attendance: 6,976; Referees: Milivoje Jovčić, Ioannis Foufis, Michele Rossi

1 March 2024 27	Barcelona (Spanish Basketball Federation)	67–77	(French Federation of Basketball) AS Monaco	Barcelona
20:30	Scoring by quarter: 21–12, 14–21, 16–27, 16–17
	Pts: Veselý 19; Rebs: Veselý 10; Asts: Satoranský 4 PIR: Veselý 32	Boxscore	Pts: James 17; Rebs: James 8 Asts: James, Okobo 4 PIR: Hall 20	Arena: Palau Blaugrana; Attendance: 7,045; Referees: Sreten Radović, Seffi Shemmesh, Sašo Petek

7 March 2024 28	Valencia Basket (Spanish Basketball Federation)	78–88	(Spanish Basketball Federation) Barcelona	Valencia
20:30	Scoring by quarter: 18–18, 24–19, 15–22, 21–29
	Pts: Ojeleye 19; Rebs: Inglis 6 Asts: Harper 4 PIR: Jones 19	Boxscore	Pts: Veselý 21; Rebs: Satoranský 8 Asts: Laprovíttola 7 PIR: Veselý 25	Arena: La Fonteta; Attendance: 7,437; Referees: Robert Lottermoser, Milan Nedović, Gentian Cici

14 March 2024 29	Barcelona (Spanish Basketball Federation)	94–76	(Basketball Federation of Serbia) Partizan Mozzart Bet	Barcelona
20:30	Scoring by quarter: 29–24, 22–24, 23–20, 20–8
	Pts: Laprovíttola 17; Rebs: Rubio 6 Asts: Rubio 6 PIR: Veselý 17	Boxscore	Pts: Avramović 27; Rebs: LeDay 6 Asts: Avramović, Punter 3 PIR: Avramović 25	Arena: Palau Blaugrana; Attendance: 7,047; Referees: Oļegs Latiševs, Piotr Pastusiak, Artūras Šukys

20 March 2024 30	Fenerbahçe Beko (Turkish Basketball Federation)	88–74	(Spanish Basketball Federation) Barcelona	Istanbul
18:45	Scoring by quarter: 23–11, 23–14, 16–32, 26–17
	Pts: Wilbekin 18; Rebs: Motley 6 Asts: Gudurić 4 PIR: Hayes-Davis 26	Boxscore	Pts: Brizuela 18; Rebs: da Silva 7 Asts: Laprovíttola 7 PIR: Hernangómez 14	Arena: Ülker Sports and Event Hall; Attendance: 12,960; Referees: Matej Boltauzer, Joseph Bissang, Luka Kardum

22 March 2024 31	Panathinaikos AKTOR (Hellenic Basketball Federation)	89–81	(Spanish Basketball Federation) Barcelona	Marousi
20:15	Scoring by quarter: 20–23, 14–23, 26–15, 29–20
	Pts: Nunn 22; Rebs: Mitoglou 10; Asts: Sloukas 8 PIR: Sloukas 25	Boxscore	Pts: Veselý, Hernangómez 13; Rebs: Satoranský, Hernangómez 5 Asts: Satoranský 6 PIR: Satoranský 20	Arena: OAKA Altion; Attendance: 17,948; Referees: Mehdi Difallah, Gytis Vilius, Michele Rossi

28 March 2024 32	Bayern Munich (German Basketball Federation)	79–87	(Spanish Basketball Federation) Barcelona	Munich
20:30	Scoring by quarter: 19–25, 11–22, 23–24, 26–16
	Pts: Weiler-Babb, Ibaka 17; Rebs: Ibaka 12; Asts: Francisco, Bolmaro 5 PIR: Ibaka 23	Boxscore	Pts: Parker 15; Rebs: Hernangómez 8 Asts: Satoranský 7 PIR: Parker 18	Arena: BMW Park; Attendance: 6,396; Referees: Ilija Belošević, Milan Nedović, Amit Balak

4 April 2024 33	Barcelona (Spanish Basketball Federation)	92–89	(Israeli Basketball Association) Maccabi Playtika Tel Aviv	Barcelona
20:30	Scoring by quarter: 19–19, 25–24, 26–20, 22–26
	Pts: Veselý, Abrines 17; Rebs: Satoranský 11; Asts: Laprovíttola 9 PIR: Laprovíttola 20	Boxscore	Pts: Baldwin 22; Rebs: Nebo 9 Asts: Blatt 9 PIR: Nebo 20	Arena: Palau Blaugrana; Attendance: 7,258; Referees: Damir Javor, Saša Pukl, Robert Vyklický

12 April 2024 34	LDLC ASVEL (French Federation of Basketball)	76–72	(Spanish Basketball Federation) Barcelona	Décines-Charpieu
21:00	Scoring by quarter: 24–18, 14–24, 19–15, 19–15
	Pts: Lauvergne 20; Rebs: Fall 8 Asts: Lee 8 PIR: Fall, Lee 20	Boxscore	Pts: Jokubaitis 12; Rebs: Nnaji 9 Asts: Rubio 6 PIR: Nnaji 17	Arena: LDLC Arena; Attendance: 11,329; Referees: Sreten Radović, Anne Panther, Gentian Cici

=== EuroLeague Playoffs ===
==== Playoff series ====
24 April 2024 Game 1	Barcelona (Spanish Basketball Federation)	75–77	(Hellenic Basketball Federation) Olympiacos	Barcelona
21:00 (CEST)	Scoring by quarter: 18–19, 17–25, 19–17, 21–16
	Pts: Hernangómez, Parker 13; Rebs: Parker 7 Asts: Rubio 7 PIR: Hernangómez, Rubio 14	Boxscore	Pts: Williams-Goss 15; Rebs: Petrušev 5 Asts: Walkup 5 PIR: Petrušev 16	Arena: Palau Blaugrana; Attendance: 7,328; Referees: Damir Javor, Tomislav Hordov, Rain Peerandi

26 April 2024 Game 2	Barcelona (Spanish Basketball Federation)	77–69	(Hellenic Basketball Federation) Olympiacos	Barcelona
21:00 (CEST)	Scoring by quarter: 27–14, 16–23, 17–20, 17–12
	Pts: Parker 24; Rebs: Veselý 7 Asts: Rubio 6 PIR: Parker 22	Boxscore	Pts: Peters 20; Rebs: Sikma 6 Asts: Walkup 7 PIR: Peters 19	Arena: Palau Blaugrana; Attendance: 7,692; Referees: Sreten Radović, Carmelo Paternicò, Uroš Nikolić

30 April 2024 Game 3	Olympiacos (Hellenic Basketball Federation)	80–82(OT)	(Spanish Basketball Federation) Barcelona	Piraeus
20:30 (CEST)	Scoring by quarter: 13–13, 24–19, 14–25, 20–14, Overtime: 9–11
	Pts: Petrušev 18; Rebs: Wright 8 Asts: Walkup 6 PIR: Wright 24	Boxscore	Pts: Veselý 16; Rebs: Parker 9 Asts: Laprovíttola 8 PIR: Satoranský 20	Arena: Peace and Friendship Stadium; Attendance: 12,240; Referees: Ilija Belošević, Mehdi Difallah, Milan Nedović

2 May 2024 Game 4	Olympiacos (Hellenic Basketball Federation)	92–58	(Spanish Basketball Federation) Barcelona	Piraeus
18:45 (CEST)	Scoring by quarter: 21–23, 32–14, 19–10, 20–11
	Pts: McKissic 21; Rebs: Milutinov 11; Asts: Williams-Goss 4 PIR: McKissic 28	Boxscore	Pts: Parker 10; Rebs: da Silva 7 Asts: Brizuela 3 PIR: Veselý 12	Arena: Peace and Friendship Stadium; Attendance: 12,240; Referees: Sreten Radović, Saša Pukl, Tomislav Hordov

8 May 2024 Game 5	Barcelona (Spanish Basketball Federation)	59–63	(Hellenic Basketball Federation) Olympiacos	Barcelona
21:00 (CEST)	Scoring by quarter: 12–9, 15–16, 13–15, 19–23
	Pts: Laprovíttola 17; Rebs: Satoranský 8 Asts: Satoranský 5 PIR: Laprovíttola, Satoranský 18	Boxscore	Pts: McKissic 12; Rebs: Milutinov 10; Asts: Williams-Goss 4 PIR: Milutinov 26	Arena: Palau Blaugrana; Attendance: 7,742; Referees: Sreten Radović, Damir Javor, Uroš Nikolić

=== Copa del Rey ===
==== Quarterfinals ====
16 February 2024	Barça	102–91	Baxi Manresa	Málaga
18:00	Scoring by quarter: 22–23, 28–20, 24–28, 28–20
	Pts: Parker 19; Rebs: Hernangómez 10; Asts: Laprovíttola 8 PIR: Laprovíttola 25	Boxscore	Pts: Taylor 17; Rebs: Vaulet 9 Asts: Taylor 6 PIR: Geben 16	Arena: Martín Carpena; Attendance: 10,423; Referees: Juan Carlos García González, Fernando Calatrava, Carlos Cortés

==== Semifinals ====
17 February 2024	Barça	108–76	Lenovo Tenerife	Málaga
21:00	Scoring by quarter: 14–16, 40–8, 24–24, 30–28
	Pts: Hernangómez 15; Rebs: Hernangómez 7 Asts: Satoranský 7 PIR: Hernangómez 22	Boxscore	Pts: Abromaitis 16; Rebs: Diop, Shermadini 4 Asts: Huertas 4 PIR: Abromaitis 17	Arena: Martín Carpena; Attendance: 10,547; Referees: Juan Carlos García González, Emilio Pérez Pizarro, Alfonso Olivares

==== Final ====
18 February 2024	Real Madrid	96–85	Barça	Málaga
18:30	Scoring by quarter: 19–19, 24–26, 23–18, 30–22
	Pts: Campazzo 18; Rebs: Yabusele 9 Asts: Campazzo 6 PIR: Poirier 32	Boxscore	Pts: Parker 19; Rebs: Hernangómez 8 Asts: Laprovíttola 4 PIR: Parker 17	Arena: Martín Carpena; Attendance: 10,900; Referees: Antonio Conde, Rafael Serrano, Arnau Padrós

=== Supercopa de España ===
==== Semifinals ====
16 September 2023	Barça	80–90	Real Madrid	Murcia
18:30	Scoring by quarter: 25–22, 15–20, 19–25, 21–23
	Pts: Laprovíttola 27; Rebs: Abrines 4 Asts: Laprovíttola 5 PIR: Laprovíttola 32	Boxscore	Pts: Musa 24; Rebs: Tavares 11; Asts: Campazzo 5 PIR: Tavares 28	Arena: Palacio de Deportes; Attendance: 7,400; Referees: Benjamín Jiménez, Rafael Serrano, Cristóbal Sánchez

== Individual awards ==
=== Lliga Catalana ===
Finals MVP

- (Argentina) Nicolás Laprovíttola

=== Liga ACB ===
Player of the Round

- (Spain) Willy Hernangómez – Round 11, Round 23.
