= Basque Country autonomous basketball team =

Basque Country
- National federation: Basque Basketball Federation
- Coach: Pablo Laso
Home	Away

First international
- Catalonia 102–84 Basque Country (Basque Country (autonomous community)) (Valls, Spain; 23 April 1980)

Biggest win
- Córdoba 65–96 Basque Country (Basque Country (autonomous community)) (Córdoba, Argentina; 4 August 2011)

Biggest defeat
- Argentina 92–28 Basque Country (Basque Country (autonomous community)) (Resistencia, Argentina; 31 July 2011)

The Basque Country autonomous basketball team is the basketball team of the Basque Country. The team is not affiliated to FIBA, so only plays friendly games.

== History ==
Basque Country played the Torneo de las Naciones, a tournament co-organized with Galicia and Catalonia. It was played from 2008 to 2010 and basques won the 2008 and 2009 editions.

In summer 2011, Basque Country, coached by Pablo Laso, played three games at Argentina. One against the 'B' team of, other with a team of players of Córdoba and a third game with the Argentina national basketball team. In this last game, where Argentina played with the team of the FIBA Americas Championship won Basque Country by a huge 92–28.

In 2012 the team, coached again by Laso, played two games against Senegal. Basque Country won the first game by 86–74 and lost the second one by 66–82.

== Roster ==
This is the roster of the Basque Country team for the 2016 games against Venezuela.

Basque Country Basketball Team roster
Players
Coaches

Pos.	No.	Name	Age – Date of birth	Height	Club	Ctr.
C		Jon Ander Aramburu	23 – 3 September 1992	2.04 m (6 ft 8 in)	Fundación Lucentum	(Spain)
SG		Darío Brizuela	21 – 8 November 1994	1.96 m (6 ft 5 in)	Estudiantes	(Spain)
C		Jorge Bilbao	–	2.03 m (6 ft 8 in)	Texas–Arlington	(United States)
PF		Sergio de la Fuente	26 – 1 October 1989	1.98 m (6 ft 6 in)	Ciudad de Valladolid	(Spain)
SF		Lander Lasa	28 – 16 January 1988	1.93 m (6 ft 4 in)	TAKE Tolosa	(Basque Country (autonomous community))
PG		Gaizka Maiza	20 – 14 June 1996	1.91 m (6 ft 3 in)	Iraurgi	(Basque Country (autonomous community))
SF		Mikel Motos	23 – 30 January 1993	1.94 m (6 ft 4 in)	Gipuzkoa Basket	(Basque Country (autonomous community))
C		Julen Olaizola	23 – 4 March 1993	2.02 m (6 ft 8 in)	Gipuzkoa Basket	(Basque Country (autonomous community))
C		Urko Otegi	34 – 11 August 1981	2.03 m (6 ft 8 in)	Gipuzkoa Basket	(Basque Country (autonomous community))
PG		Javier Salgado	35 – 6 August 1980	1.78 m (5 ft 10 in)	Estudiantes	(Spain)
SG		Ander Zubizarreta	–		College of Idaho	(United States)

Head coach

- (Basque Country (autonomous community)) Pablo Laso

Assistant coaches

- (Basque Country (autonomous community)) Lorenzo Encinas

Legend

- Club – describes last club
  before the tournament
- Age – describes age
  on 17 July 2016

== Games played ==
23 April 1980	Catalonia	102–84	Basque Country	Valls

24 April 1980	Catalonia	99–92	Basque Country	Vic

26 April 1980	Basque Country	96–101	Catalonia	Vitoria-Gasteiz

27 April 1980	Basque Country	129–124	Catalonia	Bilbao

29 May 1989	Basque Country	96–112	San Marino	Bilbao

31 May 1989	Basque Country	86–116	Soviet Union	Bilbao

29 June 2001	Basque Country	79–82	Egypt	Bilbao

28 June 2002	Basque Country	93–97	Croatia	Bilbao

27 June 2002	Basque Country	88–77	Uruguay	Vitoria-Gasteiz

28 June 2005	Basque Country	72–74	Cuba	Bilbao

22 June 2006	Basque Country	82–73	Japan	Bilbao
	Scoring by quarter: 20–14, 13–9, 23–20, 26–30
	Pts: Salgado, T. Urtasun 15	Report	Pts: Amino 13	Referees: García, Sánchez

6 June 2008	Catalonia	79–81	Basque Country	Girona
	Pts: Ribas 14	Report	Pts: Cortaberría 14	Arena: Fontajau; Referees: García, Sánchez

7 June 2008	Basque Country	80–72	Galicia	Girona
	Pts: L. Fernández 18	Report	Pts: Salgado 19	Arena: Fontajau

27 June 2009	Basque Country	84–80	Galicia	Bilbao
	Scoring by quarter: 25–21, 22–22, 20–12, 17–25
	Pts: Otegi 20; Rebs: Otegi 11; Asts: Alonso 4 PIR: Otegi 29	Report; Stats	Pts: Castro 15; Rebs: Antelo 8 Asts: Seijo 2 PIR: Castro 15	Arena: La Casilla; Referees: García, Alonso, López

28 June 2009	Basque Country	75–68	Canada	Bilbao
	Scoring by quarter: 18–19, 13–23, 22–12, 22–14
	Pts: Otegi 23	Report	Pts: Kabongo 12	Arena: La Casilla; Referees: Uruñuela, García, Manuel

2 July 2010	Basque Country	72–76	Catalonia	Lugo
18:00	Scoring by quarter: 22–19, 18–16, 13–24, 19–17
	Pts: Iglesias 19; Rebs: Lasa 8 Asts: M. Uriz, R. Uriz 3 PIR: Lasa 17	Stats	Pts: Blanch, G. Rubio 15; Rebs: Fornas 7 Asts: Rabaseda 2 PIR: G. Rubio 18	Arena: Pazo dos Deportes

3 July 2010	Galicia	71–79	Basque Country	Lugo
18:00	Scoring by quarter: 17–12, 21–26, 16–14, 17–27
	Pts: L. Fernández, L. López 11; Rebs: Cabanas 11; Asts: L. López 5 PIR: Pereiro 17	Stats	Pts: Casado, Lasa 15; Rebs: Iglesias, M. Uriz 6 Asts: R. Uriz 3 PIR: R. Uriz 16	Arena: Pazo dos Deportes

31 July 2011	Argentina 'B'	75–59	Basque Country	Resistencia (Argentina)
	Scoring by quarter: 22–13, 25–21, 18–6, 10–19
	Pts: Alloatti 13		Pts: Otegi 20	Arena: Estadio de Sarmiento

4 August 2011	Córdoba	65–96	Basque Country	Córdoba (Argentina)
	Scoring by quarter: 14–22, 25–21, 12–27, 14–26
	Pts: M. García 18	Report	Pts: Otegi 20	Arena: Sociedad Unión Eléctrica; Referees: Tarifeño, Zanabone, Aramayo

7 August 2011	Argentina	92–28	Basque Country	Salta (Argentina)
	Scoring by quarter: 19–9, 21–8, 23–6, 29–5
	Pts: Nocioni 24	Report	Pts: Salgado 11

6 July 2012	Basque Country	86–74	Senegal	Azpeitia
	Scoring by quarter: 27–20, 11–17, 21–20, 27–17
	Pts: Calbarro 17; Rebs: Aranburu 7 Asts: Salgado 7 PIR: Calbarro 20	Report; Stats	Pts: Ndoye 16; Rebs: Seck 10; Asts: Ndoye 2 PIR: Seck 19	Arena: Polideportivo Azpeitia

7 July 2012	Basque Country	66–82	Senegal	Gernika
	Scoring by quarter: 19–24, 21–19, 10–19, 16–20
	Pts: Salgado 15	Report	Pts: Faye 12	Arena: Polideportivo Maloste

5 July 2013	Tunisia	79–64	Basque Country	Tunisia
	Scoring by quarter: 18–20, 17–10, 18–15, 26–19
		Report	Pts: Arruti, 18

7 July 2013	Tunisia	77–60	Basque Country	Tunisia
	Scoring by quarter: 22–4, 23–10, 19–26, 13–20
	Pts: Ben Romdhane 15	Report	Pts: Lasa, Aranburu 9

19 August 2014	Basque Country	75–66	Philippines	San Sebastián
20:30	Scoring by quarter: 23-12, 20-12, 14-15, 18-27
	Pts: Cortaberría 14; Rebs: M. Uriz 7 Asts: Cortaberría 4	Report; Stats	Pts: Blatche 19; Rebs: Pingris 9 Asts: Alapag 2	Arena: Polideportivo J.A. Gasca; Referees: Antonio Sacristán, Rubén Sánchez, Paul Urbano

20 August 2014	Basque Country	77–80	Angola	San Sebastián
20:30	Scoring by quarter: 12-21, 26-16, 10-27, 29-16
	Pts: Cortaberría 19; Rebs: Otegi 14; Asts: Lasa 3	Report; Stats	Pts: Mingas, Joaquim 12; Rebs: Moreira 9 Asts: Costa 3	Arena: Polideportivo J.A. Gasca; Referees: Carlos Julio, Sergio Manuel, Gorka García

27 July 2016	Basque Country	58–59	Venezuela	Getxo
19:00	Scoring by quarter: 8–17, 20–15, 19–8, 11–19
	Pts: Salgado 12	Report	Pts: Cox 12	Arena: Polideportivo Fadura; Referees: Manuel, Sacristán

== Women's team ==
=== Games played ===
27 April 1980	Basque Country	82–85	Mexico	San Sebastián

9 June 1983	Basque Country	66–99	Bosnia and Herzegovina	Lasarte-Oria

6 December 2000	Basque Country	104–63	Australia	San Sebastián

30 December 2001	Basque Country	91–62	Ireland	Vitoria-Gasteiz

27 December 2002	Basque Country	75–40	Algeria	Durango

8 June 2003	Basque Country	44–69	Cuba	Irun

9 June 2003	Basque Country	43–82	Cuba	Gernika

28 June 2005	Basque Country	49–72	Cuba	Bilbao

22 June 2006	Basque Country	48–43	Japan	Bilbao

20 June 2007	Castile and León	53–66	Basque Country	Palencia

16 May 2008	Galicia	94–62	Basque Country	Santiago de Compostela

17 May 2008	Basque Country	66–45	Portugal	Santiago de Compostela

22 May 2009	Catalonia	56–61	Basque Country	La Seu d'Urgell

23 May 2009	Basque Country	65–87	Cuba	La Seu d'Urgell

22 May 2010	Basque Country	44–62	Galicia	Durango

23 May 2010	Basque Country	82–75	Lithuania	Durango

13 May 2011	Basque Country	58–52	Galicia	Getxo

15 May 2011	Basque Country	48–55	Catalonia	Getxo

18 May 2012	Galicia	51–62	Basque Country	Noia

19 May 2012	Basque Country	54–74	Catalonia	Noia

10 August 2013	Senegal	61–42	Basque Country	Dakar
	Pts: Nar 11	Report	Pts: Asurmendi 10

12 August 2013	Senegal	71–35	Basque Country	Dakar
	Pts: Sène 10	Report	Pts: García, Moreno 8

13 August 2013	Senegal	71–40	Basque Country	Dakar
	Pts: Traoré 23	Report	Pts: Díaz 9

12 June 2015	Basque Country	71–44	Venezuela	Vitoria-Gasteiz
	Scoring by quarter: 16–13, 13–16, 17–5, 25–10
	Pts: Pardo 14; Rebs: Lázaro, Pardo 9 PIR: Pardo 24	Boxscore	Pts: Silva 12; Rebs: three players 4 PIR: Silva 16	Referees: Uruñuela, García

13 June 2015	Basque Country	84–49	Venezuela	Tolosa
	Scoring by quarter: 21–18, 19–9, 22–8, 22–14
	Pts: Olabarria 15; Rebs: Pardo 6 PIR: Asurmendi 20	Boxscore	Pts: Silva 31; Rebs: Corrales, Silva 6 PIR: Silva 32	Referees: Uruñuela, García

3 June 2016	Basque Country	53–58	Venezuela	Zornotza
	Scoring by quarter: 9–20, 16–15, 14–14, 14–9
	Pts: Díez 12; Rebs: Díez 5 PIR: Díez 10	Boxscore	Pts: Silva 16; Rebs: Pérez 9 PIR: Silva 22	Referees: Urbano, Gómez

4 June 2016	Basque Country	53–59	Argentina	Zornotza
	Scoring by quarter: 21–8, 19–12, 5–20, 8–19
	Pts: Asurmendi 12; Rebs: Díez 7 PIR: Asurmendi 14	Boxscore	Pts: Boquete 10; Rebs: Boquete 6 PIR: Gretter, Santana 13	Referees: Pérez Bermejo, París Sarasúa

8 July 2017	Basque Country	51–69	Russia Under-19	Barakaldo
		Boxscore

9 July 2017	Basque Country	71–66	Spain Under-19	Barakaldo
		Boxscore

== Notable players ==
- Román Carbajo
- José Luis Galilea
- Iker Iturbe
- Pablo Laso
- Juanma López Iturriaga
- Juan Antonio Morales
- Santiago Zabaleta

== See also ==
- Torneo de las Naciones
- Basque Country national football team
