= Guillem Jou =

Spanish basketball player (born 1997)

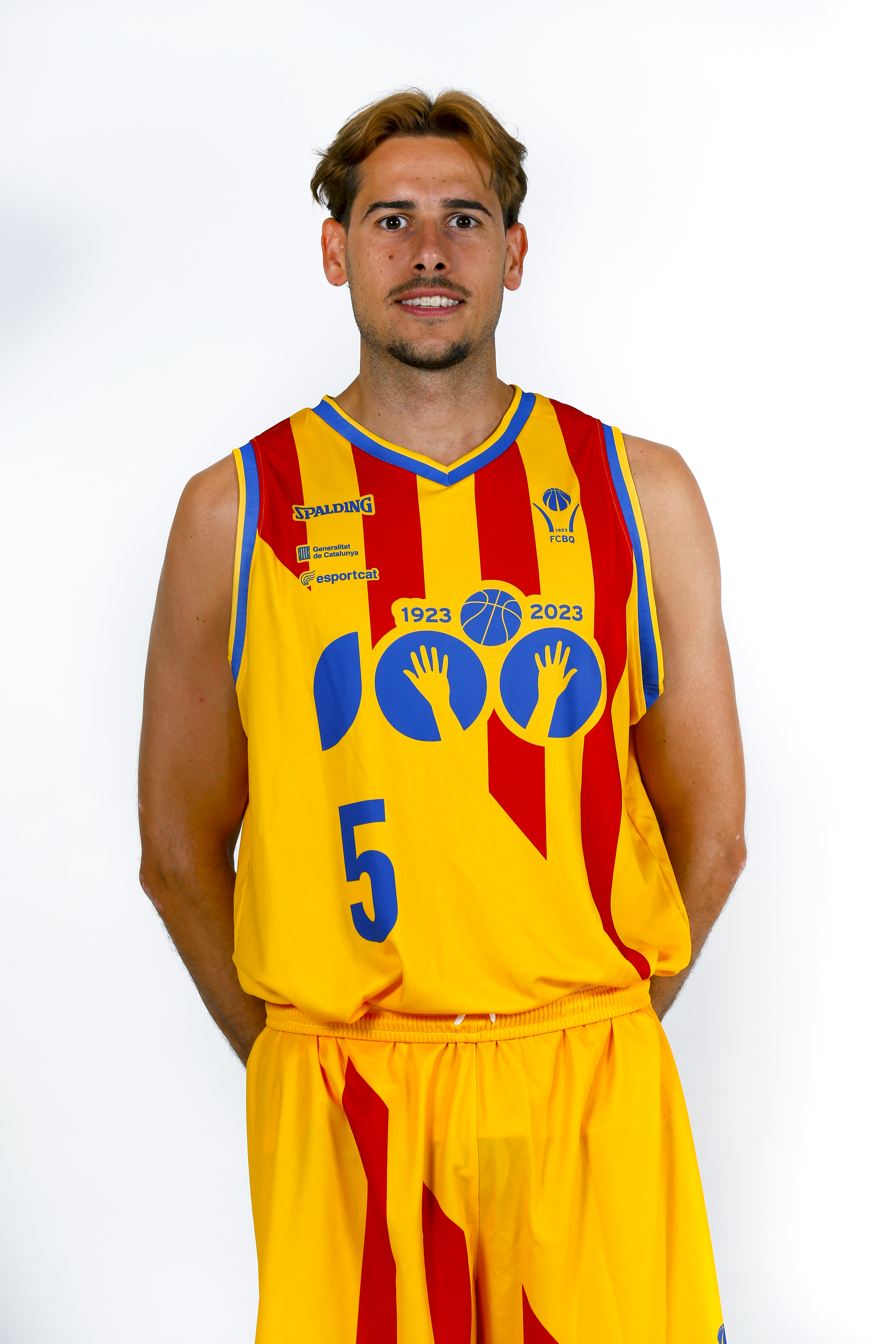
- Jou with the Catalan national team in 2023

No. 5 – Básquet Coruña
- Position: Shooting guard
- League: Primera FEB

Personal information
- Born: July 15, 1997 (age 29) Llagostera, Spain
- Listed height: 1.95 m (6 ft 5 in)
- Listed weight: 80 kg (176 lb)

Career information
- Playing career: 2015–present

Career history
- 2015–2025: Manresa
- 2015–2017: →Martorell
- 2025–present: Leyma Coruña

Guillem Jou Coll (born July 15, 1997) is a Spanish professional basketball player for Básquet Coruña of the Spanish Primera FEB. Standing at 6 ft 5 in (1.95 m), Jou plays as a shooting guard.

== Early life and youth career ==
Born in Llagostera, Catalonia, Jou started playing basketball for local club CB Llagostera. He later joined the youth ranks of CB Sant Josep in Girona before joining Bàsquet Manresa's junior team.

== Professional career ==
In 2015, Jou was loaned out to CB Martorell, a club associated to Bàsquet Manresa then playing in the Liga EBA. After playing the 2015–16 Liga EBA season with Martorell, Jou extended his stay for a second season, taking part in the 2016–17 Liga EBA season. While being part of the Martorell roster for two seasons, Jou was occasionally called up by the senior Bàsquet Manresa team. He made his Liga ACB debut in one of these occasions, at 18 years old, playing a few seconds in a game against Joventut Badalona in November 2015.

In 2017, with the team relegated to the LEB Oro after the 2016–17 ACB season, Jou joined the Bàsquet Manresa roster. Winning the 2018 LEB Oro Playoffs, Manresa achieved promotion to the Liga ACB.

Playing an increasingly important role with the Catalans in the Spanish top flight, Jou was named team captain in August 2020. In March 2021, Jou extended his contract with Manresa for two more seasons. His contract was once again extended for two more seasons in July 2023, remaining an important player for Manresa both in domestic competitions and the Basketball Champions League.

On June 18, 2025, Manresa announced Jou would be leaving the team as his contract expired by the end of the month. He spent 12 years with Manresa, playing 10 seasons for the senior team and being the third player with most games played for the Catalans after Jordi Singla and Joan Peñarroya. Additionally, he had been team captain since the 2019-20 season.

On July 15, 2025, Jou was announced as a new player for Básquet Coruña of the Primera FEB.

== National team career ==
Jou has represented the youth ranks of the Spanish national team internationally, taking part in the 2017 FIBA U20 European Championship with the Spanish U20 team.

Jou has also represented the Catalan national team.

== Career statistics ==
Legend
GP	Games played	GS	Games started	MPG	Minutes per game
FG%	Field-goal percentage	3P%	3-point field-goal percentage	FT%	Free-throw percentage
RPG	Rebounds per game	APG	Assists per game	SPG	Steals per game
BPG	Blocks per game	PPG	Points per game	PIR	Performance index rating
**Bold**	Career high

=== Domestic leagues ===
==== Regular season ====
Year	Team	League	GP	MPG	FG%	3P%	FT%	RPG	APG	SPG	BPG	PPG
2018–19	(Spain) Manresa	ACB	27	6.7	.444	.458	.652	1.	.1	.5	.1	2.1
2019–20	(Spain) Manresa	ACB	21	14.0	.364	.300	.714	1.9	.5	.3	.2	3.0
2020–21	(Spain) Manresa	ACB	23	19.4	.377	.282	.786	4.0	.9	.7	.2	5.3
2021–22	(Spain) Manresa	ACB	13	18.7	.310	.250	.818	4.0	.6	.8	.1	4.3
2022–23	(Spain) Manresa	ACB	26	18.9	.435	.313	.680	3.8	.8	1.0	.1	4.5
2023–24	(Spain) Manresa	ACB	7	12.4	.182	.100	.500	2.0	.6	.6	.1	.9
2024–25	(Spain) Manresa	ACB	16	11.6	.486	.438	1.0	2.2	.3	.4	.1	3.9
