= Catalonia national basketball team =

Catalonia
- National federation: Federació Catalana de Basquetbol
- Coach: Jaume Ponsarnau
Home	Away

First international
- Catalonia 16–50 Hindú Club (Argentina) (Catalonia, Spain; 25 March 1927)

Biggest win
- Catalonia 101–70 Cuba (Badalona, Spain; 30 June 2005)

Biggest defeat
- Catalonia 82–118 Croatia (Badalona, Spain; 24 May 1992)

The Catalonia national basketball team is the basketball team of Catalonia. Managed by the Catalan Basketball Federation, the team is not affiliated to FIBA, so it only plays exhibition games. Their last game was played in 2023 against Argentina.

== History ==
Catalonia started to play in 1927 a friendly game against Hindú Club of Buenos Aires, Argentina. Catalonia lost by 50–16.

From 1929 to 1936, the team played several friendly games with another European regions.

In April 1980, Catalonia plays several games against Basque Country, and other games against important teams like the Soviet Union, Czechoslovakia or Yugoslavia.

In 1992, Catalonia played a game against Croatia; Croatia won by 118-82 led with 30 points of Toni Kukoč and 21 point of Dražen Petrović. The game was played as the opening of new Olympic arena, before the special qualifying tournament that was held for European teams to allocate four extra berths.

Several years later, in 2002 Catalonia played for a second time against Croatia in Palau Sant Jordi, with a record attendance of 16,471 spectators. With players like Juan Carlos Navarro or Pau Gasol, Catalonia wins by 82–75.

In 2005, Catalonia played against Cuba at Palau Municipal d'Esports de Badalona winning by a huge margin: 101–70.

Last Catalonia appearances were in the Torneo de las Naciones, a tournament co-organized with Galicia and Basque Country. It was played from 2008 to 2010 and Catalans won the last edition.

In 2018, the women's team returned to activity with an 83–57 win against Montenegro at Pavelló Fontajau in Girona.

After 13 years, the Catalonia men's national team played a friendly game against Argentina on 25 July 2023, at the Nou Congost in Manresa. The game was organized to celebrate the 100th anniversary of the Catalan Basketball Federation.

== Games played ==
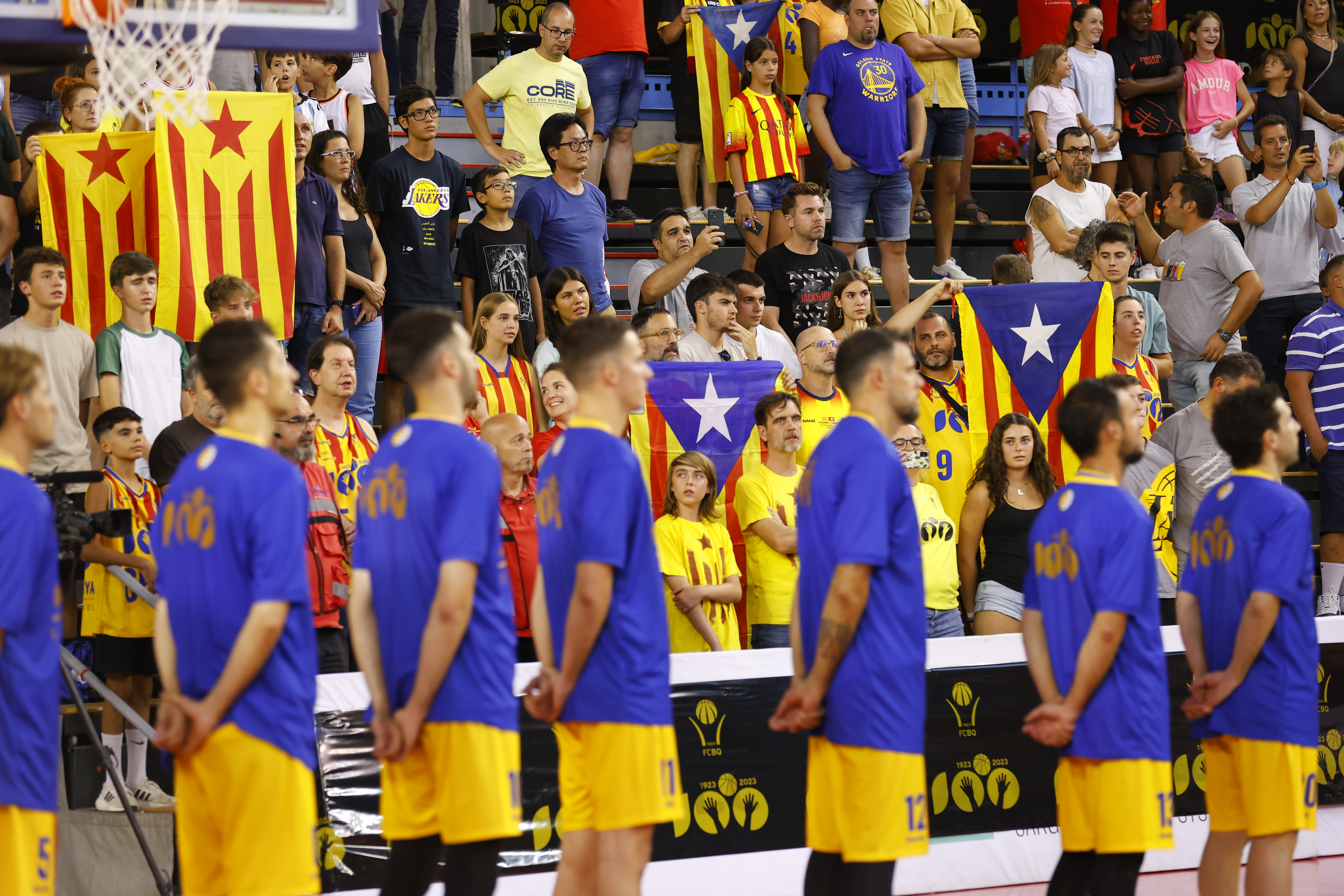
The Catalonia national basketball team before their last exhibition game in 2023

Date	Venue	Home team	Visitor	Score
25 Mar 1927	Catalonia	Catalonia	(Argentina) Hindú Club	16–50
8 Dec 1929	Barcelona	Catalonia	(Italy) Ambrosiana Milano	29–42
13 Jul 1930	Barcelona	Catalonia	(France) Foyer alsacien Mulhouse	29–26
17 Jul 1932	Barcelona	Catalonia	(France) CA Colonne	31–22
1933	Barcelona	Catalonia	(Castile (historical region)) Castile	29–33
Apr 1980	Valls	Catalonia	Basque Country	102–84
Apr 1980	Vic	Catalonia	Basque Country	99–92
Apr 1980	Vitoria-Gasteiz	Basque Country	Catalonia	96–101
Apr 1980	Bilbao	Basque Country	Catalonia	129–124
Apr 28 1980	Badalona	Catalonia	Soviet Union	97–109
Jun 1982	Barcelona	Catalonia	Brazil	81–76
Jun 1982	Barcelona	Catalonia	France	111–98
Jun 1982	Barcelona	Catalonia	Czechoslovakia	110–94
Dec 26 1987	Barcelona	Catalonia	Yugoslavia	95–120
May 24 1992	Badalona	Catalonia	Croatia	82–118
Jun 27 2002	Barcelona	Catalonia	Croatia	82–75
Jun 30 2005	Badalona	Catalonia	Cuba	101–70
Jun 6 2008	Girona	Catalonia	Basque Country	79–81
Jun 7 2008	Girona	Catalonia	Portugal	93–63
Jun 26 2009	Bilbao	Catalonia	Canada	68–69
Jun 26 2009	Bilbao	Catalonia	Galicia	93–72
Jul 2 2010	Lugo	Catalonia	Basque Country	76–72
Jul 3 2010	Lugo	Catalonia	Lithuania 'B'	78–67

=== 2010–present ===
25 July 2023 Partit del Centenari	Catalonia	88–94	Argentina	Manresa
20:30 (UTC+1)	Scoring by quarter: 15–21, 16–28, 29–22, 28–23
	Pts: Oriola 15	Boxscore	Pts: Redivo 21	Arena: Nou Congost; Attendance: 5,500; Referees: Solé, Lezcano, Baena

28 June 2026	Catalonia	74–76	Great Britain	Manresa
12:15 (UTC+1)	Scoring by quarter: 22–20, 17–12, 17–18, 18–26
	Pts: Lobo 14; Rebs: Platteeuw 6 Asts: three players 4	Boxscore	Pts: Hesson, Olaseni 11; Rebs: Boardman-Raffet 7 Asts: Wheatle 6	Arena: Nou Congost; Attendance: 2,513; Referees: Òscar Perea, Arnau Padrós, Andrés Fernández

== Roster ==
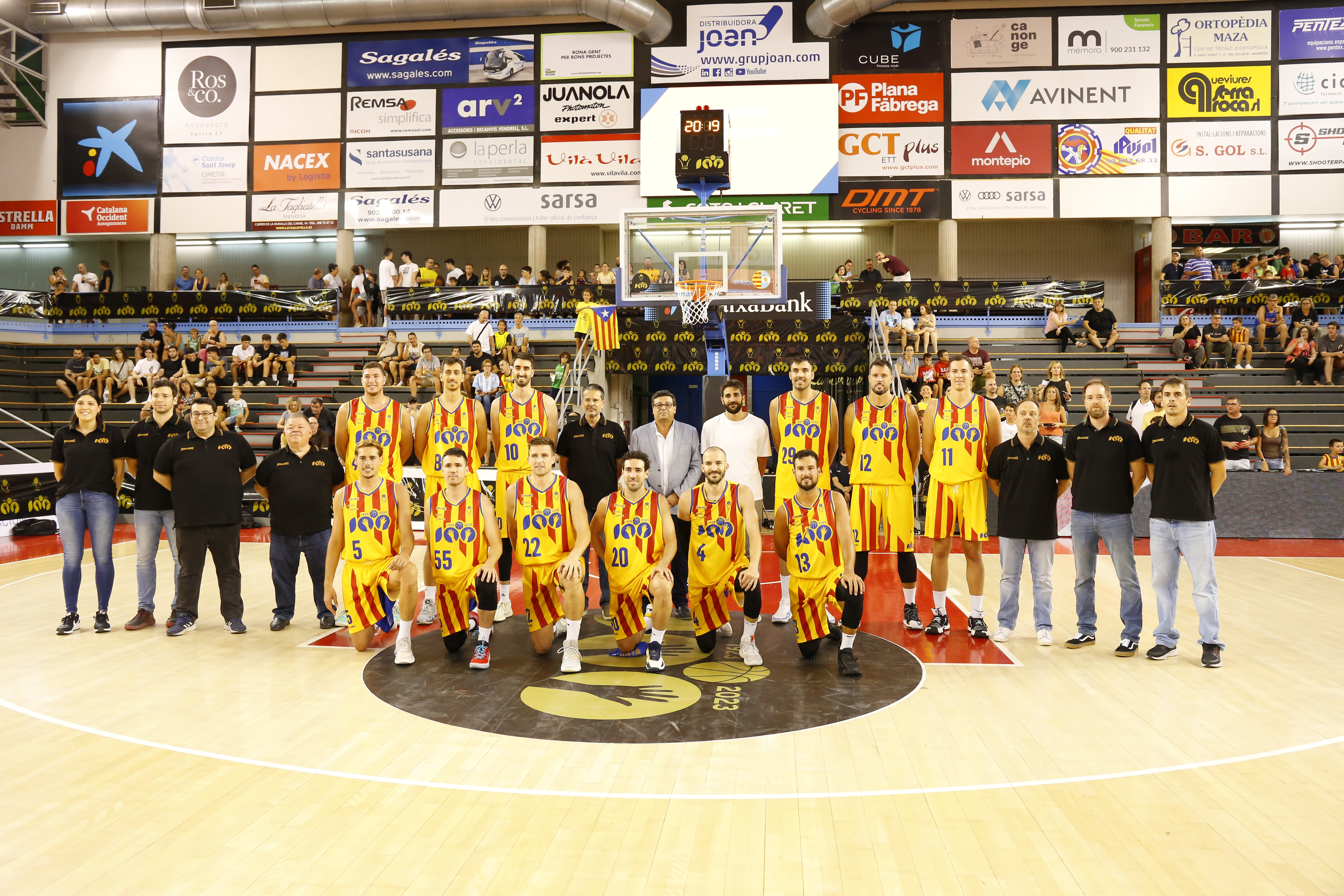
The Catalonia team for their July 2023 friendly against Argentina

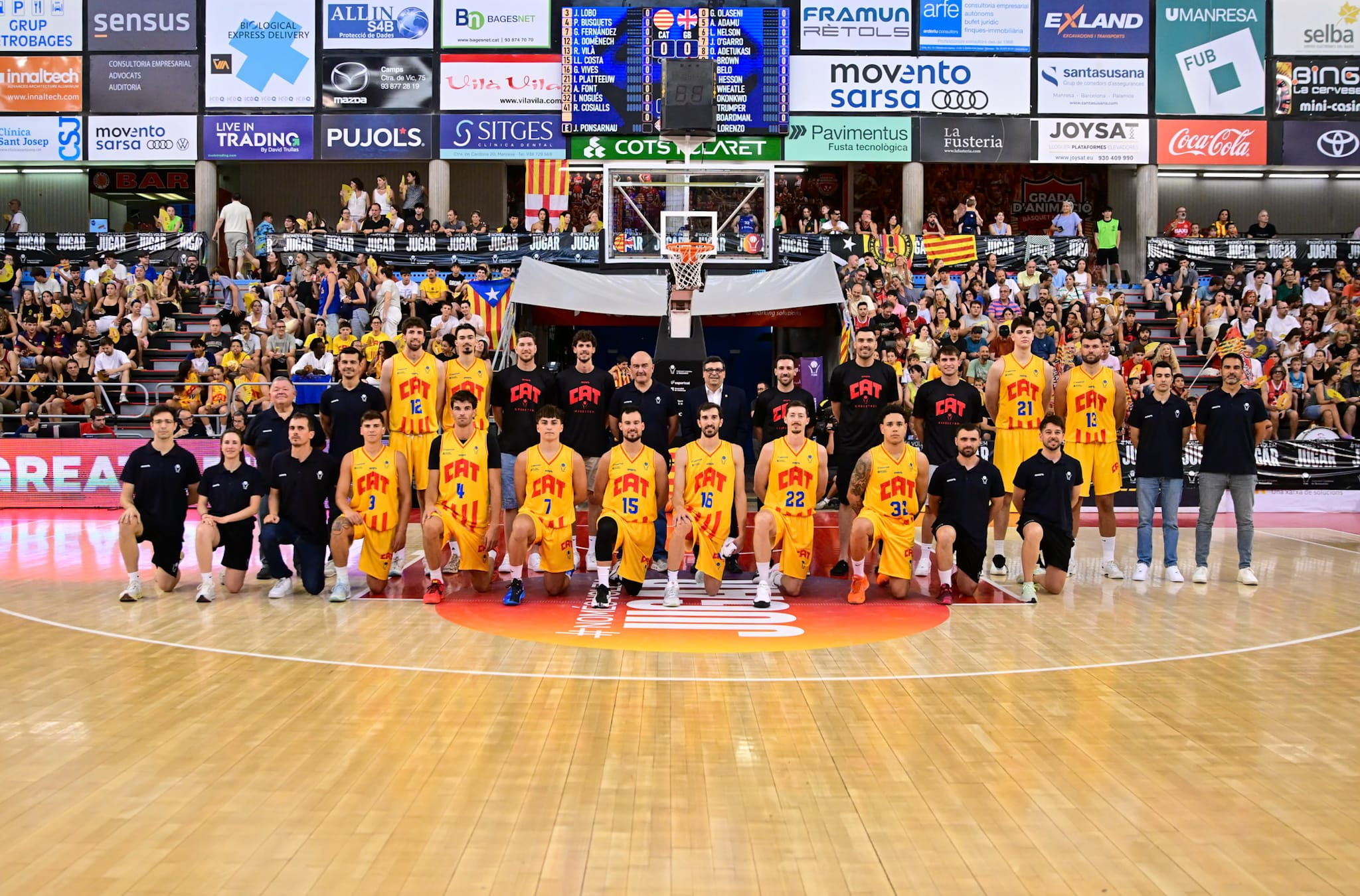
The Catalonia team for their June 2026 friendly against Great Britain

This was the roster in the Catalan national team's latest game against Great Britain (2026).

Catalonia Basketball Team roster
Players
Coaches

Pos.	No.	Name	Age – Date of birth	Height	Club	Ctr.
SG	3	Jaume Lobo	28 – 31 July 1997	1.80 m (5 ft 11 in)	CB Menorca	(Spain)
G/F	4	Pep Busquets	27 – 2 March 1999	2.01 m (6 ft 7 in)	Bàsquet Girona	(Catalonia)
PG	7	Gerard Fernández	17 – 23 August 2008	1.84 m (6 ft 0 in)	Bàsquet Manresa	(Catalonia)
PF	12	Adrià Domènech	23 – 18 July 2002	2.08 m (6 ft 10 in)	Basket Cartagena	(Spain)
C	13	Ramón Vilà	28 – 11 September 1997	2.03 m (6 ft 8 in)	CB Tizona	(Spain)
SG	15	Lluís Costa	33 – 27 February 1993	1.87 m (6 ft 2 in)	Coviran Granada	(Spain)
PG	16	Guillem Vives	33 – 16 June 1993	1.92 m (6 ft 4 in)	Joventut	(Catalonia)
C	21	Ian Platteeuw	18 – 3 November 2007	2.10 m (6 ft 11 in)	Davidson Wildcats	(United States)
SG	22	Aleix Font	28 – 11 March 1998	1.94 m (6 ft 4 in)	Bilbao Basket	(Spain)
SG	32	Isaac Nogués	22 – 10 February 2004	1.96 m (6 ft 5 in)	Valencia Basket	(Spain)
PF	41	Robert Cosialls	29 – 20 December 1996	2.04 m (6 ft 8 in)	Oviedo CB	(Spain)

Head coach

- Jaume Ponsarnau

Assistant coach

- Gerard Encuentra
- Jesús Ramírez
- Xavi Schelling

Legend

- (C) Team captain
- Club field describes pro club
  during the 2025–26 season

== Notable players ==
- Ferran Bassas
- José Lluis Cortés
- Lluís Costa
- Juan de la Cruz
- Pau Gasol
- Marc Gasol
- Rafael Jofresa
- Tomás Jofresa
- Guillem Jou
- Raúl López
- Enrique Margall
- Josep Maria Margall
- Ferran Martínez
- Juan Carlos Navarro
- Pierre Oriola
- Joel Parra
- Dani Pérez
- Xavier Rabaseda
- Pau Ribas
- Ricky Rubio
- Miquel Salvó
- Luis Miguel Santillana
- Ignacio Solozábal
- Eric Vila
- Jordi Villacampa

== See also ==
- Catalonia national football team
- Torneo de las Naciones
