= Torneo de las Naciones =

The Torneo de las Naciones (Nations Tournament) is a friendly basketball tournament held in Spain co-organized by the basketball federations of Basque Country, Catalonia and Galicia. This three regional teams participate each year in a Final Four format with an invited national team.

The players in the tournament are not identified with the Spain men's national basketball team, and the invited teams usually do not participate with their best players.

== Champions ==
Ed.	Year	Host	Winner	Runner-up	Score	MVP	Third place	Fourth place
I	2008	(Catalonia) Girona	Basque Country	Galicia	80–72	(Basque Country (autonomous community)) Javi Salgado	Catalonia	Portugal
II	2009	(Basque Country (autonomous community)) Bilbao	Basque Country	Canada	75–68	(Basque Country (autonomous community)) Urko Otegi	Catalonia	Galicia
III	2010	(Galicia (Spain)) Lugo	Catalonia	Lithuania	78–67	(Catalonia) Guillem Rubio	Basque Country	Galicia

Team	W	RU	Winning years
Basque Country	2	0	2008, 2009
Catalonia	1	0	2010
Invited team	0	2	
Galicia	0	1	

== Results ==
=== I Copa de las Naciones 2008 ===
Semi-finals
6 June
Galicia	70
Portugal	62
6 June
Catalonia	79
Basque Country	81

Final
7 June
Galicia	72
Basque Country	80
Third place
7 June
Portugal	63
Catalonia	93

=== II Copa de las Naciones 2009 ===
Semi-finals
26 June
Catalonia	68
Canada	69
26 June
Basque Country	84
Galicia	80

Final
27 June
Canada	68
Basque Country	75
Third place
27 June
Catalonia	93
(Galicia (Spain)) Galicia	72

=== III Copa de las Naciones 2010 ===
Semi-finals
2 July
Basque Country	72
Catalonia	76
2 July
Galicia	71
Lithuania	76

Final
3 July
Catalonia	78
Lithuania	67
Third place
3 July
Galicia	71
Basque Country	79
