= Joel Parra =

Spanish basketball player (born 2000)

- Parra playing for FC Barcelona in 2026

No. 44 – FC Barcelona
- Position: Small forward / power forward
- League: Liga ACB; EuroLeague

Personal information
- Born: 4 April 2000 (age 26) Barcelona, Spain
- Listed height: 2.02 m (6 ft 8 in)
- Listed weight: 88 kg (194 lb)

Career information
- Playing career: 2017–present

Career history
- 2017–2023: Joventut Badalona
- 2017–2018: →Joventut Badalona Junior
- 2018–2019: →CB Prat
- 2023–present: FC Barcelona

Career highlights
- ACB Best Young Player (2022); All-ACB Best Young Players Team (2022)
Medals
Men's basketball
Representing Spain
EuroBasket
Gold medal – first place	EuroBasket 2022
U20 European Championship
Silver medal – second place	2019 Israel	U20 Team
U18 European Championship
Silver medal – second place	2017 Slovakia	U18 Team
U16 European Championship
Gold medal – first place	2016 Poland	U16 Team

Joel Parra López (born 4 April 2000) is a Spanish professional basketball player for FC Barcelona of the Spanish Liga ACB and the EuroLeague. He has also represented the Spain national team. Standing at 6 ft 8 in (2.02 m), Parra can play both as a small forward and a power forward.

== Early life and youth career ==
Joel Parra started playing basketball in the youth ranks of Joventut de Badalona, which he joined at only four years old. Parra would also play for Arenys Bàsquet in the Liga EBA during his youth career.

== Professional career ==
=== Joventut Badalona (2017–2023) ===
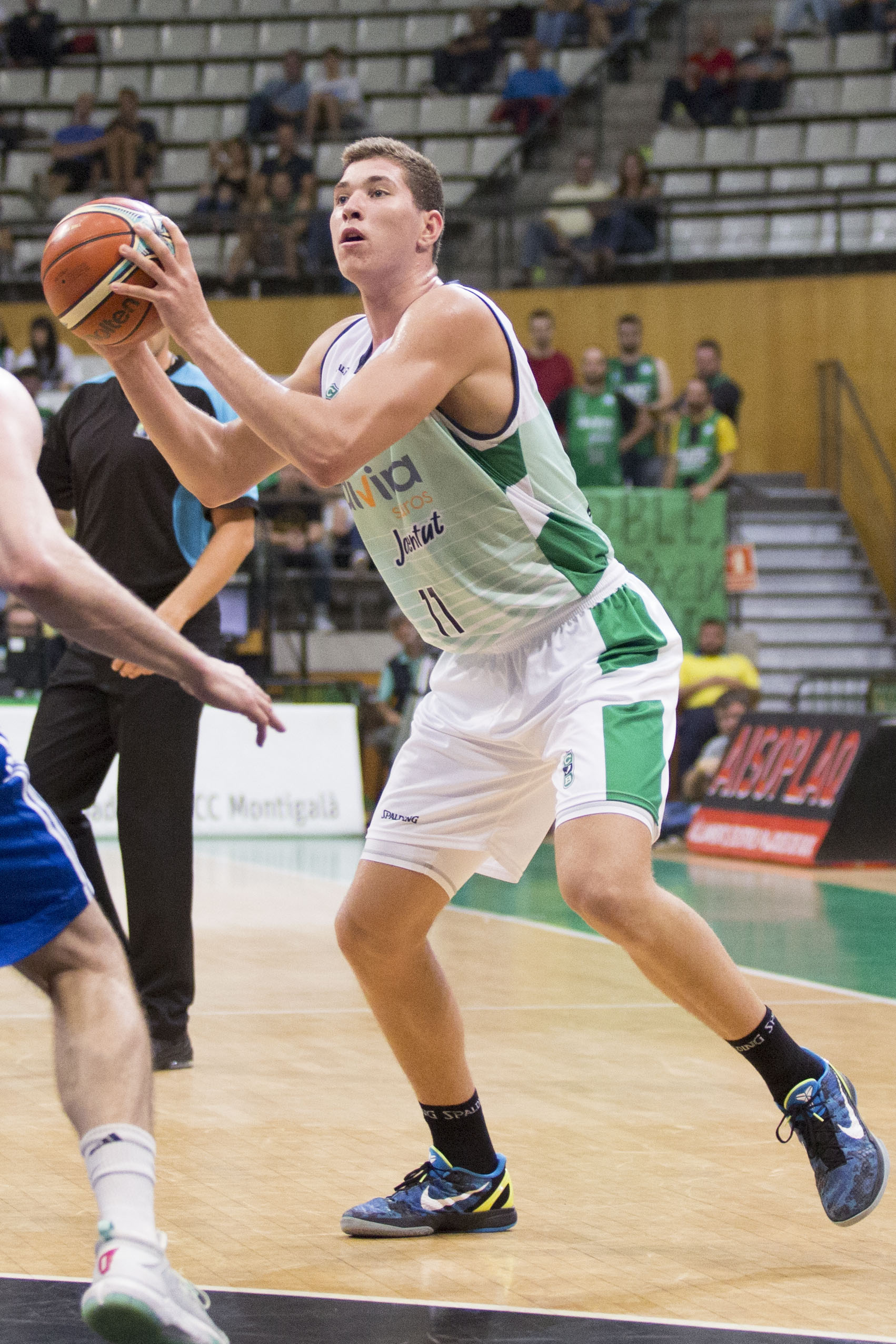
Parra during a 2017 BCL game against Kataja

Parra made his debut in Liga ACB for Joventut in 2017, in a 86–74 defeat against Unicaja Málaga. Parra would also play in the LEB Oro during a loan spell at CB Prat in the 2018-19 season. He would become a first-team Joventut player in the 2019-20 season, achieving an important role for the team during the following seasons.

Parra would be named ACB Best Young Player of the 2021-22 season, also making the All-ACB Best Young Players Team that same season. Playing for the Catalans, he would reach the semi-finals of the EuroCup in the 2022-23 season. Parra would terminate his contract with Joventut at the end of the 2022-23 season, after six seasons with the Badalona-based club.

=== FC Barcelona (2023–present) ===
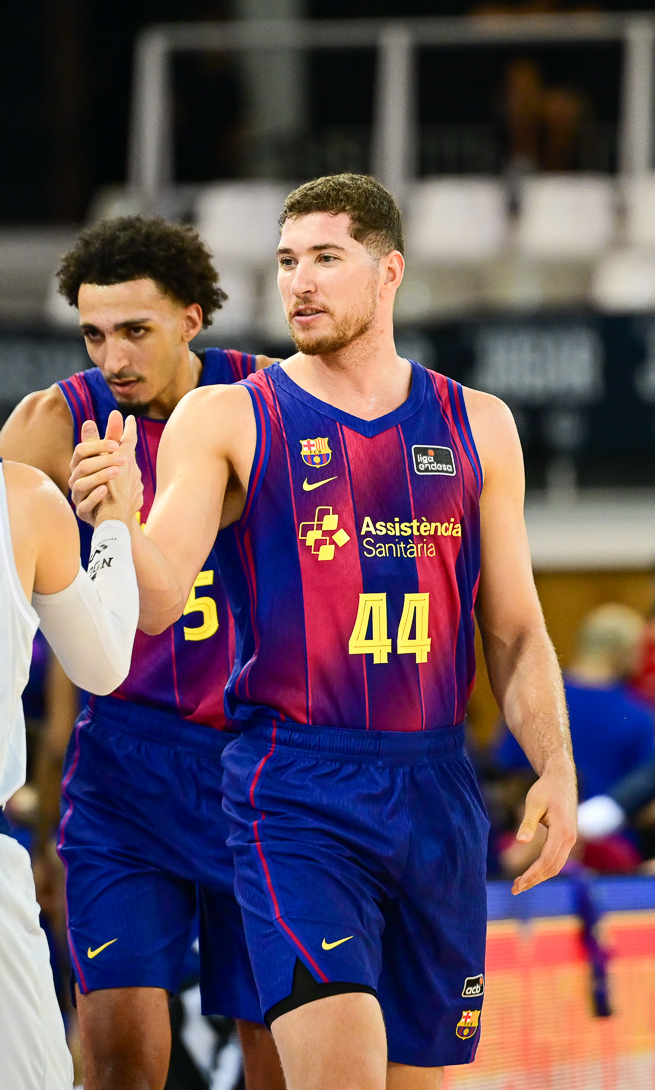
Parra with Barcelona during the 2025 Catalan Basketball League

On 11 July 2023, Parra would sign a four-year contract with Joventut's traditional rivals, FC Barcelona of the Liga ACB and EuroLeague. After an underwhelming first season, with little participation in Barcelona's rotation, Parra was left out of the Spanish Team for the 2024 Paris Olympics. This prompted Parra to undergo a major physical change to improve his condition.

Parra's role grew in his second season at Barcelona, especially after the injury of several frontcourt players in the roster. He recorded his best performance with a double-double in a crucial EuroLeague away win against Fenerbahçe, substantially improving Barcelona's playoff aspirations. On June 19, 2025, Barcelona announced the extension of Parra's contract until 2028, emphasizing his improving performances and his commitment to the team in a statement.

On December 7, 2025, he set his best scoring numbers with Barcelona with 24 points and 9 rebounds in a home win against BC Andorra. His performance earned him the MVP award for round 9 of the 2025–26 ACB season. On December 12, 2025, Parra suffered a nasal fracture in a EuroLeague game against Olympiacos.

On July 10, 2026, Parra signed a contract extension through 2030 with Barcelona.

== National team career ==
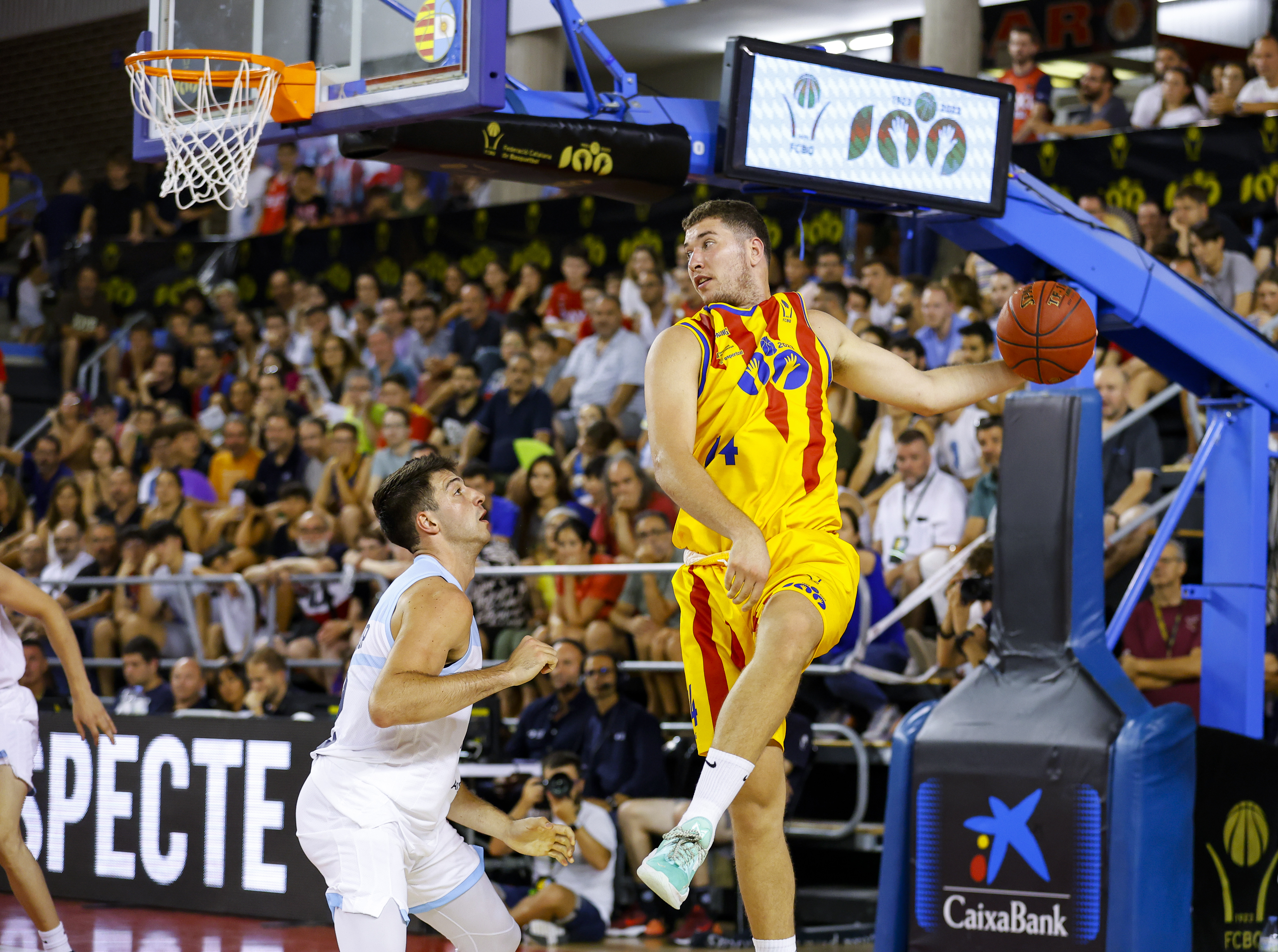
Parra playing an exhibition game for Catalonia in 2023

Parra has played in several international tournaments with the youth ranks of the Spanish national team, winning the U16 European Championship in 2016.

He was selected to the senior Spanish team for the 2022 EuroBasket in Germany, in which Spain were crowned champions in a final against France.

Parra has also played for the Catalan national team in an exhibition game in July 2023.

== Career statistics ==
Legend
GP	Games played	GS	Games started	MPG	Minutes per game
FG%	Field-goal percentage	3P%	3-point field-goal percentage	FT%	Free-throw percentage
RPG	Rebounds per game	APG	Assists per game	SPG	Steals per game
BPG	Blocks per game	PPG	Points per game	PIR	Performance index rating
**Bold**	Career high

=== EuroLeague ===
Year	Team	GP	GS	MPG	FG%	3P%	FT%	RPG	APG	SPG	BPG	PPG	PIR
2023–24	Barcelona	26	1	13.0	.484	**.272**	.692	2.1	.2	.3	.1	2.9	2.7
2024–25	Barcelona	**31**	**6**	**14.5**	**.586**	.239	**.773**	**2.8**	**.6**	**.6**	.1	**4.9**	**5.5**
Career		57	7	14.0	.558	.256	.743	2.5	.5	.4	.1	4.0	4.2

=== EuroCup ===
Year	Team	GP	GS	MPG	FG%	3P%	FT%	RPG	APG	SPG	BPG	PPG	PIR
2019–20	Joventut	16	3	10.9	.478	.285	**1.000**	2.3	.3	.1	—	2.8	2.8
2020–21	Joventut	18	4	14.4	.593	.181	.800	2.6	.5	.5	**.2**	3.1	4.2
2021–22	Joventut	18	15	23.7	.591	.317	.760	**4.9**	**1.4**	**.6**	.1	10.5	12.4
2022–23	Joventut	**21**	**16**	**26.2**	**.595**	**.493**	.854	3.9	1.2	.5	.0	**12.8**	**14.4**
Career		73	38	19.2	.583	.392	.822	3.5	.9	.5	.1	7.7	8.9

=== Domestic leagues ===
Year	Team	League	GP	MPG	FG%	3P%	FT%	RPG	APG	SPG	BPG	PPG
2017–18	(Spain) Joventut	ACB	1	3	—	.000	—	—	—	—	—	0.0
2018–19	(Spain) Joventut	ACB	11	1.8	.417	.000	—	0.5	—	—	—	0.9
2019–20	(Spain) Joventut	ACB	22	8.7	.319	.227	.625	1.1	.1	.0	.0	1.8
2020–21	(Spain) Joventut	ACB	39	13.8	.487	.378	.767	2.8	.2	.4	.1	3.7
2021–22	(Spain) Joventut	ACB	41	24.2	.483	.369	.831	4.4	.9	.9	.2	8.6
2022–23	(Spain) Joventut	ACB	40	26.3	.463	.308	.823	5.4	1.1	.4	.2	9.6
2023–24	(Spain) Barcelona	ACB	36	17.5	.453	.340	.735	3.2	.6	.5	.1	6.4
2024–25	(Spain) Barcelona	ACB	33	21.2	.520	.366	.897	4.2	1.1	1.0	.2	8.5

== Awards and accomplishments ==
=== Individual ===
- ACB Best Young Player (2022)
- All-ACB Best Young Players Team (2022)

=== Spanish junior national team ===
- 2016 FIBA U16 European Championship: Gold
- 2017 FIBA U18 European Championship: Silver
- 2019 FIBA U20 European Championship: Silver

=== Spanish national team ===
- 2022 EuroBasket: Gold
