= Roger Fornas =

Spanish basketball player

CB Vic
- Position: Power forward
- League: LEB Plata

Personal information
- Born: October 24, 1982 (age 43) Barcelona, Spain
- Listed height: 6 ft 8 in (2.03 m)
- Listed weight: 220 lb (100 kg)

Career information
- Playing career: 2003–present

Career history
- 2003–2004: Cosehisa Monzón
- 2004: Lleida
- 2004–2005: Tarragona
- 2005–2006: UB Sabadell
- 2006–2007: CB L'Hospitalet
- 2007–2008: Breogán
- 2008–2009: Lleida
- 2009: Valladolid
- 2009–2010: Cáceres 2016
- 2010: Andorra
- 2010–2012: Tarragona
- 2012–2015: Palencia
- 2015–2016: San Pablo Inmobiliaria Burgos
- 2016–2018: Palma
- 2018–present: Vic

Roger Fornas Lladó (born October 24, 1982, in Barcelona) is a Spanish professional basketball player. He last played for CB Vic of the LEB Plata.

== Career ==
After playing in the youth teams of Joventut Badalona and Baloncesto León, on October Fornas debuted in Liga ACB with Caprabo Lleida. He only played 37 seconds.

At the moment, he spent all his career in LEB Oro and LEB Plata leagues, achieving the title with CB Valladolid in 2009.

== Honours ==
Plus Pujol Lleida

- LEB Catalan League Champion: 1
  - 2008

CB Valladolid

- LEB Oro Champion: 1
  - 2009
