= Javi Salgado =

Spanish basketball player

Javier Salgado
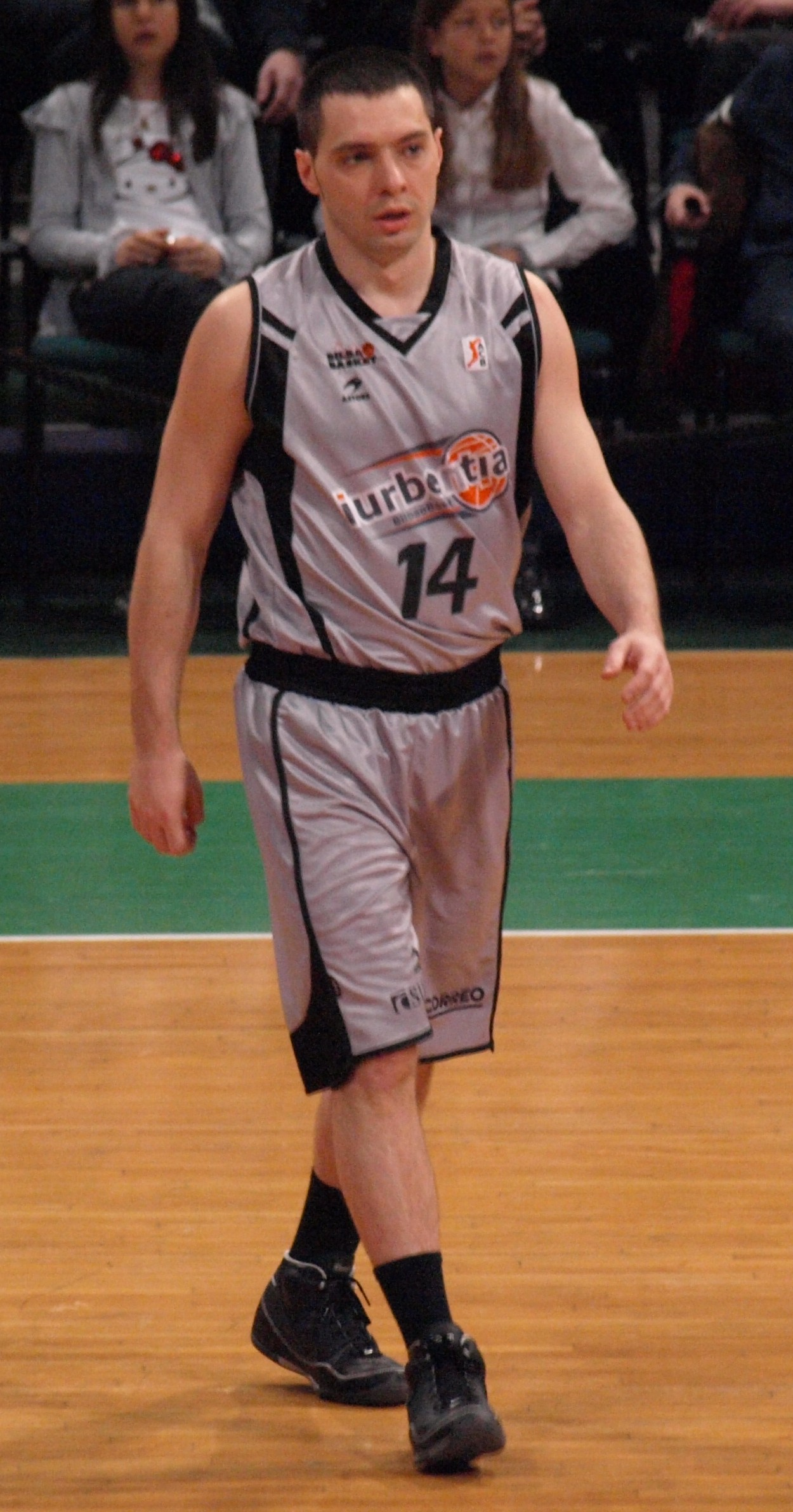
- Javi Salgado, in a game with Bilbao Basket in 2009

Personal information
- Born: August 6, 1980 (age 46) Bilbao, Spain
- Listed height: 5 ft 11 in (1.80 m)
- Listed weight: 181 lb (82 kg)

Career information
- Playing career: 1998–present
- Position: Point guard
- Number: 14

Career history
- 1998–1999: SD Patronato
- 1999–2000: Baloncesto León B
- 2001–2010: Bilbao Basket
- 2010–2014: Gipuzkoa Basket
- 2014–2016: Estudiantes
- 2016–2019: Bilbao Basket

Career highlights
- LEB Oro champion (2004); LEB Plata champion (2002); Liga ACB Free Throw Percentage leader (2015); No. 14 retired by Bilbao Basket

Javier Salgado Martín, more commonly known as Javi Salgado, is a retired Spanish professional basketball player.

== Early career ==
After being formed at Maristas school in Bilbao, Salgado started his career at SD Patronato in 1998. The next year, he signed with Baloncesto León, to play in the club's reserve team (Elmar León), in the Liga EBA, in that time the Spanish third division.

== Professional career ==
In 2001, Salgado joined the newly created team in his native town: Bilbao Basket. With this team, he would go on to play during the next ten seasons, in three different level leagues on the Spanish basketball league system: LEB Plata, LEB Oro, and Liga ACB, playing also in two EuroCup semifinals, in 2009 and 2010.

After leaving the team in summer 2010, his number 14 jersey was retired at Bilbao Basket. He signed with Lagun Aro GBC in July 2010, from Bilbao's neighboring city of San Sebastián.

On July 18, 2016, he returned to Dominion Bilbao Basket, where he remained until he retired at the end of the 2017-18 ACB season.

== Spain national team ==
Salgado played with the Spain national under-20 basketball team, and he also played in several friendly games with the Basque Country autonomous basketball team.

== Awards and accomplishments ==
- LEB Plata: (1)
  - 2002
- Copa LEB Plata: (1)
  - 2002
- LEB Oro: (1)
  - 2004
