= Lucho Fernández (basketball) =

Spanish basketball player

Personal information
- Born: 8 February 1975 (age 51) Ferrol, Spain
- Listed height: 2.02 m (6 ft 8 in)

Career information
- Playing career: 1997–2014
- Position: Power forward

Career history
- 1997–1999: CB Galicia
- 1999–2000: CB Los Barrios
- 2000–2001: UB La Palma
- 2001–2004: Bilbao Basket
- 2004–2005: Gipuzkoa BC
- 2005–2006: CB Calpe
- 2006–2007: Baloncesto León
- 2007–2008: Saski Baskonia
- 2008–2009: CB Breogán
- 2009–2011: Aguas de Sousas Ourense
- 2011–2012: Baloncesto León
- 2012–2013: Marín Peixegalego

José Luis Fernández Sixto, more commonly known as Lucho Fernández (born 8 February 1975) is a Spanish retired professional basketball player who last played for Marín Peixegalego.

== Honours ==
- 2007–08 ACB League Champion with Tau Cerámica
