= 2024–25 FC Barcelona Bàsquet season =

Spanish basketball club season

FC Barcelona
2024–25 season
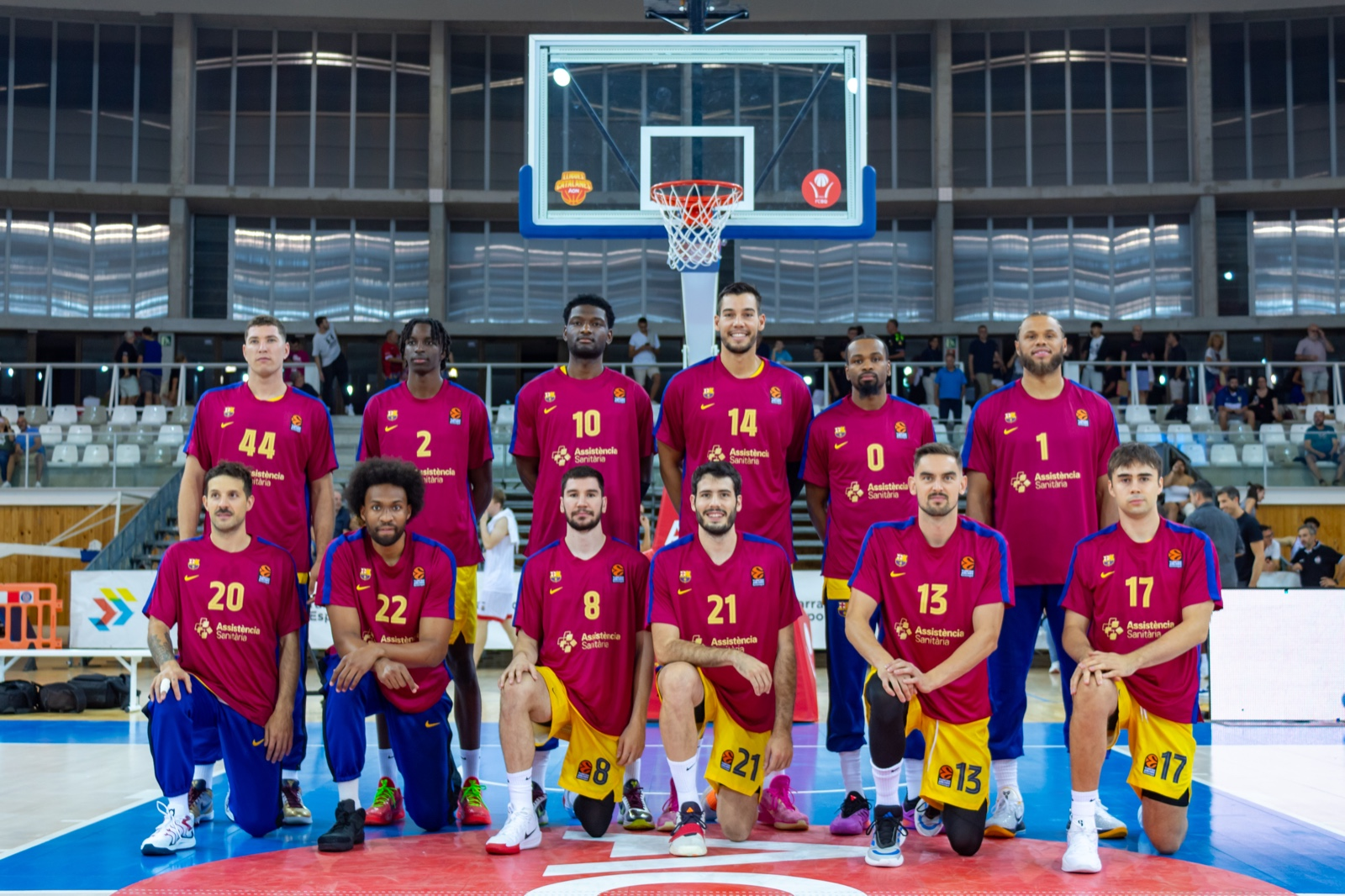
- Barcelona roster in September 2024
- President: Joan Laporta
- Head coach: Joan Peñarroya
- Arena: Palau Blaugrana
- Liga ACB: Quarterfinals
- EuroLeague: Playoff series
- Copa del Rey: Quarterfinals
- Supercopa de España: Semifinals
- Highest home attendance: 7,572 vs Real Madrid (28 November 2024)
- Average home attendance: 6,242 (in EuroLeague); 5,662 (in Liga ACB)
- Biggest win: 100–71 vs Maccabi Tel Aviv (5 February 2025)
- Biggest defeat: 100–78 vs Bayern Munich (22 November 2024); 59–81 vs Unicaja Málaga (6 June 2025)
Home	Away
- All statistics correct as of 18 June 2025.

The 2024–25 season was FC Barcelona's 98th in existence, their 59th consecutive season in the top flight of Spanish basketball and 26th consecutive season in the EuroLeague.

In the 2024–25 season, FC Barcelona competed in the Liga ACB, Copa del Rey, Spanish Supercup and EuroLeague.

== Overview ==
=== Pre-season ===
After an underwhelming 2023–24 season, Barcelona decided to terminate coach Roger Grimau's contract on June 8, 2024. On June 14, the club announced Joan Peñarroya would take over as new head coach, signing a contract for two seasons.

After being linked with Barcelona the previous summer, Kevin Punter was announced as the first signing of the season. Signing a one-season deal, he arrived as a free agent after parting ways with his previous club, KK Partizan. On June 25, Justin Anderson signed a one-season deal, coming from Valencia Basket. Juan Núñez, a former Real Madrid academy player, signed a 3-year contract after having played the previous season for Ratiopharm Ulm. Nigerian-American forward Chimezie Metu signed a one-year deal on July 30, after playing with the Detroit Pistons of the NBA the previous season. Senegalese-French center Youssoupha Fall was the last summer addition, signing a one-season deal on July 31. Previously playing for LDLC ASVEL, Fall became the tallest player to ever play for Barcelona standing at 2.22 m tall. Additionally, youth player Dame Sarr was announced as a first team player on August 14, after previously playing for FC Barcelona B.

In early September, Barcelona took part in two friendly pre-season games in the Qianjiang Century City International Basketball Summit 2024 held in Hangzhou, China. The rivals were the Beijing Ducks and Bàsquet Girona. Later in September, Barcelona took part in the 2024 edition of the Lliga Catalana de Bàsquet, held in Tarragona. Barcelona won the final against Bàsquet Manresa and Willy Hernangómez was named Finals MVP.

== Players ==
=== Roster ===
Note: Flags indicate national team eligibility at FIBA-sanctioned events. Players may hold other non-FIBA nationalities not displayed.

FC Barcelona roster
Players
Coaches

Pos.	No.	Nat.	Name	Ht.	Wt.	Age
SG	0	(United States) (Serbia)	Punter, Kevin	1.93 m (6 ft 4 in)	81 kg (179 lb)	31 – 25 June 1993
SF	1	(United States)	Anderson, Justin	1.96 m (6 ft 5 in)	105 kg (231 lb)	31 – 19 November 1993
G/F	2	(Italy) (Senegal)	Sarr, Dame (Y)	1.98 m (6 ft 6 in)	82 kg (181 lb)	19 – 4 June 2006
F/C	6	(Czech Republic)	Veselý, Jan	2.13 m (7 ft 0 in)	110 kg (243 lb)	35 – 24 April 1990
SG	8	(Spain)	Brizuela, Darío	1.88 m (6 ft 2 in)	78 kg (172 lb)	30 – 8 November 1994
F/C	10	(Nigeria) (United States)	Metu, Chimezie	2.08 m (6 ft 10 in)	102 kg (225 lb)	28 – 22 March 1997
PG	13	(Czech Republic)	Satoranský, Tomáš	2.00 m (6 ft 7 in)	95 kg (209 lb)	33 – 30 October 1991
C	14	(Spain)	Hernangómez, Willy	2.10 m (6 ft 11 in)	113 kg (249 lb)	31 – 27 May 1994
PG	17	(Spain)	Núñez, Juan (Y)	1.94 m (6 ft 4 in)	86 kg (190 lb)	21 – 4 June 2004
C	19	(Senegal) (France)	Fall, Youssoupha	2.22 m (7 ft 3 in)	125 kg (276 lb)	30 – 12 January 1995
G	20	(Argentina) (Italy)	Laprovíttola, Nicolás	1.91 m (6 ft 3 in)	82 kg (181 lb)	35 – 31 January 1990
G/F	21	(Spain)	Abrines, Álex (C)	1.98 m (6 ft 6 in)	91 kg (201 lb)	31 – 1 August 1993
PF	22	(United States)	Parker, Jabari	2.03 m (6 ft 8 in)	113 kg (249 lb)	30 – 15 March 1995
C	41	(Mali)	Keita, Sayon (Y)	2.14 m (7 ft 0 in)		17 – 1 March 2008
F	44	(Spain)	Parra, Joel	2.03 m (6 ft 8 in)	88 kg (194 lb)	25 – 4 April 2000
PG	45	(Spain)	Villar, Raúl (Y)	1.91 m (6 ft 3 in)		17 – 13 October 2007
SG	46	(France) (Germany)	Grujicic, Mathieu (Y)	1.96 m (6 ft 5 in)		18 – 2 June 2007

Head coach

- (Spanish Basketball Federation) Joan Peñarroya

Assistant coach(es)

- (Spanish Basketball Federation) Oscar Orellana
- (Spanish Basketball Federation) Víctor Sada
- (Spanish Basketball Federation) Xavi Beltran

Team manager

- (Spanish Basketball Federation) Juan Carlos Navarro

Legend

- (C) Team captain
- (Y) Youth player
- Injured

- Roster
- Transactions

=== Depth chart ===
Pos.	Starting 5	Bench 1	Bench 2	Bench 3
C	Jan Veselý	Willy Hernangómez †	Youssoupha Fall	Sayon Keita ‡
PF	Jabari Parker *	Chimezie Metu	Joel Parra †
SF	Justin Anderson *	Álex Abrines †	Dame Sarr ‡
SG	Kevin Punter	Darío Brizuela †		Mathieu Grujičić ‡
PG	Nicolás Laprovíttola	Tomáš Satoranský	Juan Núñez ‡	Raúl Villar ‡

Notes: Blue † – homegrown player; (Note: A homegrown player is a player that played for at least three years before the age of 20 on a Spanish team. In Liga ACB, the team must register at least four homegrown players in rosters of 10–12 players or at least three homegrown players in rosters of 8–9 players. In EuroLeague, the team did not have any limitations regarding the number of homegrown players.) Red * – overseas player; (Note: An overseas player is a player from outside EEA, FIBA Europe or ACP states. In Liga ACB, the team may register at most two overseas players. In EuroLeague, the team did not have any limitations regarding the number of overseas players.) Green ‡ – youth player (Note: In Liga ACB, the team may register under-22 players linked to the youth system. In EuroLeague, the team may register under-20 players linked to the youth system.)

=== On loan ===
Players out on loan
Nat.	Player	Position	Team	On loan since
(Nigeria)	James Nnaji	C	(Spain) Girona (Turkey) Merkezefendi	August 2024–March 2025; March–June 2025

=== Roster changes ===
==== In ====
No.	Pos.	Nat.	Name	Moving from		Type	Date	Source
0	SG	(Serbia)	Kevin Punter	KK Partizan	(Serbia)	Contract termination	19 Jun 2024	
1	SF	(United States)	Justin Anderson	Valencia	(Spain)	End of contract	25 Jun 2024	
17	PG	(Spain)	Juan Núñez	Ratiopharm Ulm	(Germany)	Contract termination	26 Jun 2024	
10	F/C	(Nigeria)	Chimezie Metu	Detroit Pistons	(United States)	End of contract	30 Jul 2024	
19	C	(Senegal)	Youssoupha Fall	LDLC ASVEL	(France)	End of contract	31 Jul 2024	
2	G/F	(Italy)	Dame Sarr	Youth system	(Spain)	Senior contract	14 Aug 2024	
23	PG	(Brazil)	Raul Neto	Pinheiros	(Brazil)	End of contract	24 Nov 2024	

==== Out ====
No.	Pos.	Nat.	Name	Moving to		Type	Date	Source
10	F	(Serbia)	Nikola Kalinić	Crvena zvezda	(Serbia)	End of contract	30 Jun 2024	
1	F/C	(Germany)	Oscar da Silva	Bayern Munich	(Germany)	Parted ways	30 Jun 2024	
3	SF	(Spain)	Oriol Paulí	Hiopos Lleida	(Spain)	End of contract	30 Jun 2024	
9	PG	(Spain)	Ricky Rubio	Free agent		End of contract	30 Jun 2024	
5	SF	(Spain)	Sergi Martínez	Bàsquet Girona	(Spain)	End of contract	1 Jul 2024	
45	PG	(Spain)	Rafa Villar	Hiopos Lleida	(Spain)	End of contract	1 Jul 2024	
43	PG	(Uruguay)	Agustín Ubal	Coviran Granada	(Spain)	End of contract	1 Jul 2024	
6	PG	(Argentina)	Juani Marcos	Bàsquet Girona	(Spain)	End of contract	1 Jul 2024	
31	PG	(Lithuania)	Rokas Jokubaitis	Maccabi Tel Aviv	(Israel)	Parted ways	15 Jul 2024	
23	PG	(Brazil)	Raul Neto	Free agent		Parted ways	2 Jan 2025	

== Pre-season and friendlies ==
=== Friendly matches ===
1 September 2024	FC Barcelona (Spanish Basketball Federation)	99–57	(Chinese Basketball Association (organisation)) Beijing Ducks	Hangzhou
19:00	Scoring by quarter: 28–19, 23–15, 22–14, 27–9
	Pts: Abrines 14	Report		Arena: Hangzhou Olympic Sports Center

2 September 2024	Girona (Catalonia)	72–64	(Catalonia) FC Barcelona	Hangzhou
19:30	Scoring by quarter: 10–21, 23–16, 22–11, 17–16
	Pts: Durham 17; Rebs: Pons 7 Asts: Ferrando 7 PIR: Martínez 16	Boxscore	Pts: Punter, Anderson 13; Rebs: Fall 5 Asts: Laprovíttola 4 PIR: Anderson 13	Arena: Hangzhou Olympic Sports Center

=== Lliga Catalana de Bàsquet ===
12 September 2024 Second round	FC Barcelona (Catalonia)	90–77	(Andorran Basketball Federation) MoraBanc Andorra	Tarragona
21:00	Scoring by quarter: 17–16, 26–15, 24–23, 23–23
	Pts: Punter, Laprovíttola 16	Report	Pts: Evans 15	Arena: Palau d'Esports Catalunya

13 September 2024 Third round	Girona (Catalonia)	79–83	(Catalonia) FC Barcelona	Tarragona
21:00	Scoring by quarter: 21–13, 22–22, 19–26, 17–22
	Pts: Durham 17	Report	Pts: Parker 23	Arena: Palau d'Esports Catalunya

15 September 2024 Final	FC Barcelona (Catalonia)	98–81	(Catalonia) Baxi Manresa	Tarragona
19:30	Scoring by quarter: 25–20, 20–21, 28–15, 25–25
	Pts: Hernangómez 17	Report	Pts: Alston Jr., Hunt 19	Arena: Palau d'Esports Catalunya

== Competitions ==
=== Overview ===
Competition	First match	Last match	Starting round	Final position	Record							
Competition	First match	Last match	Starting round	Final position	Pld	W	D	L	PF	PA	PD	Win %
Liga ACB	29 September 2024	8 June 2025	Round 1	5th	37	22		15	3,388	3,211	+177	59.46
EuroLeague	3 October 2024	6 May 2025	Round 1	Playoff series	39	22		17	3,418	3,272	+146	56.41
Copa del Rey	13 February 2025	13 February 2025	Quarter-finals	Quarter-finals	1	0		1	86	91	−5	0.00
Supercopa de España	21 September 2024	21 September 2024	Semi-finals	Semi-finals	1	0		1	83	89	−6	0.00
Total					78	44	0	34	6,975	6,663	+312	56.41

Last updated: 17 June 2025
Source: Competitions

=== Liga ACB ===
==== League table ====
Pos	Team	Pld	W	L	PF	PA	PD	Qualification or relegation
3	La Laguna Tenerife	34	25 (Note: Valencia Basket finished ahead of La Laguna Tenerife on head–to–head record: Valencia Basket 96–81 La Laguna Tenerife, La Laguna Tenerife 99–102 Valencia Basket.)	9	2970	2827	+143	Qualification to playoffs
4	Unicaja	34	23	11	3057	2857	+200	Qualification to playoffs
5	Barça	34	21	13	3133	2936	+197	Qualification to playoffs
6	Joventut Badalona	34	20	14	2892	2828	+64	Qualification to playoffs
7	Dreamland Gran Canaria	34	19 (Note: Dreamland Gran Canaria finished ahead of Baskonia on head–to–head point difference: Dreamland Gran Canaria 92–86 Baskonia, Baskonia 84–80 Dreamland Gran Canaria.)	15	2850	2830	+20	Qualification to playoffs

Source: ACB
Rules for classification: 1) Win–loss record; 2) Head–to–head record; 3) Head–to–head point difference; 4) Point difference; 5) Points scored; 6) Sum of quotients of points scored (Note: Head–to–head record is used only after all the matches between the teams in question have been played)

==== Results summary ====
Overall						Home					Away				
Pld	W	L	PF	PA	PD	W	L	PF	PA	PD	W	L	PF	PA	PD
34	21	13	3133	2936	+197	12	5	1620	1450	+170	9	8	1513	1486	+27

Source: Competitive matches

==== Results by round ====
Round	1	2	3	4	5	6	7	8	9	10	11	12	13	14	15	16	17	18	19	20	21	22	23	24	25	26	27	28	29	30	31	32	33	34
Ground	H	A	A	H	A	H	A	H	A	H	A	H	A	A	H	A	H	A	H	A	H	H	A	H	A	H	A	H	H	A	H	A	H	A
Result	W	W	W	L	L	W	L	W	L	W	L	W	L	L	L	W	W	W	L	W	W	L	W	W	W	L	W	W	W	L	W	L	W	W
Position	1	2	2	3	6	4	5	5	7	6	8	6	8	8	9	8	8	6	8	7	7	7	5	5	5	5	5	5	5	5	5	5	5	5

Source: Competitive matches
A = Away; H = Home; W = Win; L = Loss; R = Rest

==== Matches ====
29 September 2024 1	FC Barcelona	91–65	Covirán Granada	Barcelona
12:30	Scoring by quarter: 19–11, 24–10, 18–26, 30–18
	Pts: Metu 17; Rebs: Núñez 7 Asts: Satoranský 5 PIR: Metu 26	Boxscore	Pts: García 22; Rebs: Vicedo 6 Asts: Rousselle 5 PIR: García 28	Arena: Palau Blaugrana; Attendance: 5,734; Referees: Rafael Serrano, Cristóbal Sánchez, Guillermo Ríos

6 October 2024 2	Hiopos Lleida	74–78	FC Barcelona	Lleida
12:30	Scoring by quarter: 12–17, 18–20, 16–20, 28–21
	Pts: Bropleh 15; Rebs: Murić 8 Asts: Walden 3 PIR: Cooke 16	Boxscore	Pts: Parra 16; Rebs: Parker 8 Asts: Brizuela 4 PIR: Parra 18	Arena: Espai Fruita Barris Nord; Attendance: 6,100; Referees: Juan Carlos García González, Alfonso Olivares, David Sánchez

13 October 2024 3	La Laguna Tenerife	91–95	FC Barcelona	San Cristóbal de La Laguna
18:30	Scoring by quarter: 20–17, 23–22, 25–29, 23–27
	Pts: Shermadini 19; Rebs: Shermadini 5 Asts: Fitipaldo, Huertas 7 PIR: Shermadini 26	Boxscore	Pts: Laprovíttola 22; Rebs: Abrines 5 Asts: Laprovíttola 6 PIR: Laprovíttola 22	Arena: Santiago Martín; Attendance: 5,156; Referees: Benjamín Jiménez, Joaquín García, Yasmina Alcaraz

20 October 2024 4	FC Barcelona	89–93	Baskonia	Barcelona
18:30	Scoring by quarter: 26–21, 16–20, 24–27, 27–25
	Pts: Parker 19; Rebs: four players 4 Asts: Laprovíttola 8 PIR: Parker 21	Boxscore	Pts: Forrest 19; Rebs: Forrest, Diop 6 Asts: Luwawu-Cabarrot 5 PIR: Forrest 27	Arena: Palau Blaugrana; Attendance: 5,753; Referees: Emilio Pérez Pizarro, Javier Torres, Vicente Martínez

27 October 2024 5	Unicaja	103–96	FC Barcelona	Málaga
18:30	Scoring by quarter: 24–19, 25–29, 25–23, 29–25
	Pts: Perry 22; Rebs: Osetkowski 8 Asts: Carter 6 PIR: Perry 24	Boxscore	Pts: Anderson 19; Rebs: Satoranský, Fall 5 Asts: Satoranský 9 PIR: Satoranský 25	Arena: Martín Carpena; Attendance: 10,681; Referees: Carlos Peruga, Carlos Cortés, Alberto Sánchez Sixto

3 November 2024 6	FC Barcelona	106–80	Leyma Coruña	Barcelona
12:30	Scoring by quarter: 19–26, 29–16, 28–18, 30–20
	Pts: Metu, Parker 15; Rebs: Anderson 6 Asts: Brizuela, Núñez 4 PIR: Metu 20	Boxscore	Pts: Scrubb 14; Rebs: Burjanadze 7 Asts: Taylor 9 PIR: Burjanadze 16	Arena: Palau Blaugrana; Attendance: 5,709; Referees: Alfonso Olivares, Jorge Martínez, Roberto Lucas

10 November 2024 7	Río Breogán	77–70	FC Barcelona	Lugo
18:30	Scoring by quarter: 27–17, 11–19, 18–20, 21–14
	Pts: Moore 22; Rebs: Vila 7 Asts: Moore 8 PIR: Moore 18	Boxscore	Pts: Fall 13; Rebs: Fall 10; Asts: Punter, Satoranský 4 PIR: Fall 21	Arena: Pazo dos Deportes; Attendance: 5,310; Referees: Jordi Aliaga, Francisco Araña, Raúl Zamorano

17 November 2024 8	FC Barcelona	102–99	Valencia Basket	Barcelona
18:30	Scoring by quarter: 29–19, 21–19, 21–29, 31–32
	Pts: Punter 24; Rebs: Veselý 10; Asts: Núñez, Satoranský 6 PIR: Punter 21	Boxscore	Pts: Ojeleye 19; Rebs: Pradilla 6 Asts: Montero 6 PIR: Ojeleye 25	Arena: Palau Blaugrana; Attendance: 5,499; Referees: Benjamín Jiménez, Joaquín García, Andrés Fernández

1 December 2024 9	Baxi Manresa	85–72	FC Barcelona	Manresa
12:30	Scoring by quarter: 22–22, 29–16, 19–15, 15–19
	Pts: Pérez 22; Rebs: Alston Jr. 8 Asts: Pérez 4 PIR: Pérez 21	Boxscore	Pts: Hernangómez 17; Rebs: Hernangómez 12; Asts: Punter 4 PIR: Satoranský 24	Arena: Nou Congost; Attendance: 4,917; Referees: Emilio Pérez Pizarro, Alberto Baena, Cristóbal Sánchez

8 December 2024 10	FC Barcelona	86–79	UCAM Murcia	Barcelona
17:00	Scoring by quarter: 23–20, 22–20, 20–18, 21–21
	Pts: Veselý 20; Rebs: three players 6 Asts: Satoranský 6 PIR: Punter, Veselý 20	Boxscore	Pts: Ennis 17; Rebs: Ennis, Todorović 6 Asts: Ennis, Håkanson 3 PIR: Ennis 17	Arena: Palau Blaugrana; Attendance: 4,942; Referees: Óscar Perea, Luis Miguel Castillo, Yasmina Alcaraz

15 December 2024 11	Casademont Zaragoza	108–95	FC Barcelona	Zaragoza
18:30	Scoring by quarter: 16–18, 25–29, 33–17, 34–31
	Pts: Bell-Haynes 35; Rebs: Fernández 10; Asts: Spissu 7 PIR: Bell-Haynes 37	Boxscore	Pts: three players 18; Rebs: Parker 8 Asts: Satoranský 8 PIR: Abrines, Brizuela 15	Arena: Pabellón Príncipe Felipe; Attendance: 7,466; Referees: Juan Carlos García González, Martín Caballero, Andrés Fernández

22 December 2024 12	FC Barcelona	105–79	MoraBanc Andorra	Barcelona
17:00	Scoring by quarter: 17–23, 30–18, 28–21, 30–17
	Pts: Satoranský 20; Rebs: Parra 6 Asts: Satoranský 6 PIR: Satoranský 28	Boxscore	Pts: Bassas 15; Rebs: Ortega 6 Asts: Bassas, Luz 6 PIR: dos Anjos 16	Arena: Palau Blaugrana; Attendance: 5,088; Referees: Carlos Peruga, Carlos Cortés, Alberto Sánchez Sixto

29 December 2024 13	Real Madrid	73–71	FC Barcelona	Madrid
20:30	Scoring by quarter: 21–15, 15–16, 21–20, 16–20
	Pts: Campazzo 17; Rebs: Hezonja 11; Asts: Campazzo 6 PIR: Hezonja 24	Boxscore	Pts: Parker 18; Rebs: Parker 9 Asts: Veselý 5 PIR: Satoranský 22	Arena: WiZink Center; Attendance: 12,050; Referees: Antonio Conde, Fernando Calatrava, Roberto Lucas

5 January 2025 15	FC Barcelona	90–91(OT)	Joventut	Barcelona
12:30	Scoring by quarter: 11–21, 25–19, 12–13, 28–23, Overtime: 14–15
	Pts: Punter 19; Rebs: Parker 6 Asts: Núñez, Satoranský 4 PIR: Parra 20	Boxscore	Pts: Gates 20; Rebs: Hanga 6 Asts: Dotson, Vives 6 PIR: Pustovyi 22	Arena: Palau Blaugrana; Attendance: 6,518; Referees: Rafael Serrano, Juan de Dios Oyón, Raúl Zamorano

7 January 2025 14	Bàsquet Girona	91–90	FC Barcelona	Girona
20:30	Scoring by quarter: 28–20, 23–24, 13–27, 27–19
	Pts: Iroegbu 25; Rebs: Fernández 8 Asts: Iroegbu 4 PIR: Iroegbu 23	Boxscore	Pts: Anderson 25; Rebs: Metu 6 Asts: Núñez, Satoranský 5 PIR: Anderson 29	Arena: Fontajau; Attendance: 5,288; Referees: Óscar Perea, Sergio Manuel, Rubén Sánchez Mohedas

12 January 2025 16	Dreamland Gran Canaria	74–77	FC Barcelona	Las Palmas
13:00	Scoring by quarter: 18–18, 14–21, 24–22, 18–16
	Pts: Tobey 15; Rebs: Brussino 6 Asts: Brussino 3 PIR: Brussino 24	Boxscore	Pts: Punter 22; Rebs: three players 4 Asts: Núñez, Satoranský 5 PIR: Punter 22	Arena: Gran Canaria Arena; Attendance: 7,817; Referees: Benjamín Jiménez, Vicente Martínez, Fabio Fernández

19 January 2025 17	FC Barcelona	97–84	Surne Bilbao Basket	Barcelona
18:00	Scoring by quarter: 17–25, 25–17, 32–19, 23–23
	Pts: Parker 16; Rebs: Hernangómez 8 Asts: Satoranský 7 PIR: three players 18	Boxscore	Pts: Abdur-Rahkman 19; Rebs: De Ridder 7 Asts: Pantzar 3 PIR: Abdur-Rahkman 22	Arena: Palau Blaugrana; Attendance: 6,358; Referees: Luis Miguel Castillo, Alberto Baena, David Sánchez

26 January 2025 18	UCAM Murcia	90–95(OT)	FC Barcelona	Murcia
18:30	Scoring by quarter: 19–22, 11–17, 20–13, 12–17, Overtime: 12–17
	Pts: Birgander 25; Rebs: Kurucs 10; Asts: Radebaugh, Håkanson 4 PIR: Birgander, Radebaugh 26	Boxscore	Pts: Punter 20; Rebs: Metu, Parra 8 Asts: Satoranský, Veselý 4 PIR: Satoranský 21	Arena: Palacio de Deportes; Attendance: 7,150; Referees: Martín Caballero, Arnau Padrós, Jorge Martínez

2 February 2025 19	FC Barcelona	92–103	Baxi Manresa	Barcelona
17:00	Scoring by quarter: 20–20, 24–26, 17–32, 31–25
	Pts: Metu 21; Rebs: Fall 6 Asts: Brizuela, Satoranský 3 PIR: Parker 22	Boxscore	Pts: Alston Jr. 29; Rebs: Massa 6 Asts: Pérez 9 PIR: Alston Jr. 29	Arena: Palau Blaugrana; Attendance: 5,594; Referees: Carlos Cortés, Sergio Manuel, Fabio Fernández

9 February 2025 20	Valencia Basket	86–100	FC Barcelona	Valencia
18:30	Scoring by quarter: 19–25, 18–27, 28–30, 21–18
	Pts: Jones 19; Rebs: Costello 7 Asts: Badio 7 PIR: Costello 21	Boxscore	Pts: Punter 17; Rebs: Fall, Metu 6 Asts: Núñez 5 PIR: Metu 21	Arena: La Fonteta; Attendance: 7,911; Referees: Emilio Pérez Pizarro, Francisco Araña, Iyán González

2 March 2025 21	FC Barcelona	102–79	Río Breogán	Barcelona
17:00	Scoring by quarter: 21–33, 27–11, 24–15, 30–20
	Pts: Sarr 21; Rebs: Hernangómez 8 Asts: Metu 5 PIR: Sarr 22	Boxscore	Pts: Hilliard 16; Rebs: Vila 5 Asts: Grant, Hilliard 5 PIR: Sakho 15	Arena: Palau Blaugrana; Attendance: 4,468; Referees: Fernando Calatrava, Joaquín García, Esperanza Mendoza

9 March 2025 22	FC Barcelona	92–95	La Laguna Tenerife	Barcelona
18:30	Scoring by quarter: 19–19, 21–20, 25–26, 27–30
	Pts: Parra 14; Rebs: Hernangómez 7 Asts: Brizuela, Satoranský 4 PIR: Parra 20	Boxscore	Pts: Shermadini, Krämer 20; Rebs: Doornekamp 6 Asts: Huertas 15; PIR: Huertas 29	Arena: Palau Blaugrana; Attendance: 5,622; Referees: Juan Carlos García González, Alfonso Olivares, Jorge Martínez

16 March 2025 23	MoraBanc Andorra	91–113	FC Barcelona	Andorra la Vella
17:00	Scoring by quarter: 23–29, 20–29, 29–34, 19–21
	Pts: Harding 31; Rebs: Chougkaz 9 Asts: Evans 6 PIR: Harding 31	Boxscore	Pts: Parker 34; Rebs: Parra 6 Asts: Brizuela 8 PIR: Parker 31	Arena: Pavelló Toni Martí; Attendance: 4,117; Referees: Óscar Perea, Javier Torres, Yasmina Alcaraz

23 March 2025 24	FC Barcelona	97–95	Casademont Zaragoza	Barcelona
17:00	Scoring by quarter: 20–27, 22–25, 26–25, 29–18
	Pts: Metu 16; Rebs: Hernangómez 5 Asts: Satoranský 6 PIR: Parker 18	Boxscore	Pts: Sulejmanović 16; Rebs: Sulejmanović 8 Asts: Sulejmanović 5 PIR: Sulejmanović 23	Arena: Palau Blaugrana; Attendance: 4,798; Referees: Arnau Padrós, Iyán González, Vicente Martínez

30 March 2025 25	Joventut	86–93	FC Barcelona	Badalona
18:30	Scoring by quarter: 18–22, 14–28, 21–27, 33–16
	Pts: Dekker, Tomić 17; Rebs: Hanga 11; Asts: Dotson, Robertson 6 PIR: Tomić 22	Boxscore	Pts: Parker, Punter 14; Rebs: Fall 8 Asts: Abrines 4 PIR: Abrines, Punter 17	Arena: Palau Municipal d'Esports; Attendance: 12,231; Referees: Antonio Conde, Alberto Sánchez Sixto, Guillermo Ríos

6 April 2025 26	FC Barcelona	89–91	Real Madrid	Barcelona
18:30	Scoring by quarter: 24–20, 15–22, 22–26, 28–23
	Pts: Punter 19; Rebs: Anderson 7 Asts: Brizuela, Punter 3 PIR: Parra 20	Boxscore	Pts: Llull 19; Rebs: Tavares 10; Asts: Musa 6 PIR: Tavares 25	Arena: Palau Blaugrana; Attendance: 7,334; Referees: Carlos Peruga, Carlos Cortés, Sergio Manuel

13 April 2025 27	Covirán Granada	86–93	FC Barcelona	Granada
17:00	Scoring by quarter: 26–33, 18–20, 17–20, 25–20
	Pts: Noua 18; Rebs: Noua 8 Asts: three players 3 PIR: Noua 19	Boxscore	Pts: Punter 21; Rebs: Brizuela 5 Asts: Satoranský 7 PIR: Parker 22	Arena: Palacio de Deportes; Attendance: 7,291; Referees: Juan Carlos García González, Javier Torres, Carlos Merino

20 April 2025 28	FC Barcelona	104–90	Dreamland Gran Canaria	Barcelona
18:30	Scoring by quarter: 18–26, 34–20, 29–21, 23–23
	Pts: Brizuela 18; Rebs: three players 6 Asts: Satoranský 6 PIR: Punter 20	Boxscore	Pts: Shurna 23; Rebs: Pelos, Tobey 5 Asts: Albicy 9 PIR: Shurna 24	Arena: Palau Blaugrana; Attendance: 5,640; Referees: Benjamín Jiménez, Francisco Araña, Juan de Dios Oyón

27 April 2025 29	FC Barcelona	83–81	Unicaja	Barcelona
18:30	Scoring by quarter: 24–18, 15–19, 18–24, 26–23
	Pts: Parker 15; Rebs: Fall 10; Asts: Parker, Villar 3 PIR: Fall 19	Boxscore	Pts: Carter 18; Rebs: Kalinoski, Pérez 6 Asts: Díaz 4 PIR: Perry 16	Arena: Palau Blaugrana; Attendance: 5,384; Referees: Antonio Conde, Arnau Padrós, Roberto Lucas

8 May 2025 30	Leyma Coruña	93–92	FC Barcelona	A Coruña
20:30	Scoring by quarter: 23–27, 34–18, 18–22, 18–25
	Pts: Barrueta 20; Rebs: Barrueta 6 Asts: Taylor 12; PIR: Taylor 27	Boxscore	Pts: Parker 21; Rebs: Hernangómez 7 Asts: three players 2 PIR: Hernangómez 19	Arena: Coliseum da Coruña; Attendance: 7,814; Referees: Fernando Calatrava, Alberto Baena, Iyán González

11 May 2025 31	FC Barcelona	98–72	Hiopos Lleida	Barcelona
12:30	Scoring by quarter: 31–18, 22–17, 29–17, 16–20
	Pts: Punter 18; Rebs: three players 5 Asts: Satoranský 7 PIR: Punter 21	Boxscore	Pts: Murić 11; Rebs: Oriola, Wiggins 6 Asts: three players 2 PIR: Oriola 11	Arena: Palau Blaugrana; Attendance: 5,127; Referees: Jordi Aliaga, Javier Torres, Igor Esteve

18 May 2025 32	Baskonia	110–98	FC Barcelona	Vitoria-Gasteiz
17:00	Scoring by quarter: 19–23, 38–21, 26–31, 27–23
	Pts: Howard 34; Rebs: Hall 8 Asts: Forrest 11; PIR: Howard 34	Boxscore	Pts: Parker 21; Rebs: Hernangómez 10; Asts: Parra 4 PIR: Hernangómez 27	Arena: Buesa Arena; Attendance: 11,271; Referees: Benjamín Jiménez, Óscar Perea, Jorge Martínez

25 May 2025 33	FC Barcelona	97–74	Bàsquet Girona	Barcelona
17:00	Scoring by quarter: 32–19, 21–16, 26–21, 18–18
	Pts: Parker 21; Rebs: Hernangómez 10; Asts: Brizuela, Parker 5 PIR: Parker 27	Boxscore	Pts: Iroegbu 19; Rebs: Iroegbu 7 Asts: Marcos 5 PIR: Iroegbu 26	Arena: Palau Blaugrana; Attendance: 5,450; Referees: Martín Caballero, Fabio Fernández, David Sánchez

30 May 2025 34	Surne Bilbao Basket	68–85	FC Barcelona	Bilbao
18:30	Scoring by quarter: 14–26, 16–19, 18–20, 20–20
	Pts: Frey 14; Rebs: Bagayoko 7 Asts: three players 2 PIR: Pantzar 15	Boxscore	Pts: Punter 15; Rebs: Hernangómez 7 Asts: Satoranský 6 PIR: Hernangómez 18	Arena: Bilbao Arena; Attendance: 7,998; Referees: Rafael Serrano, Javier Torres, Cristóbal Sánchez

=== ACB Playoffs ===
==== Quarterfinals ====
3 June 2025 1	Unicaja	97–101(OT)	Barça	Málaga
21:15	Scoring by quarter: 21–16, 25–21, 14–25, 25–23, Overtime: 12–16
	Pts: Carter 13; Rebs: Pérez 7 Asts: Perry 10; PIR: Pérez 16	Boxscore	Pts: Punter 21; Rebs: Hernangómez, Parra 7 Asts: Punter 5 PIR: Punter 28	Arena: Martín Carpena; Attendance: 10,554; Referees: Juan Carlos García González, Francisco Araña, Jorge Martínez

6 June 2025 2	Barça	59–81	Unicaja	Barcelona
19:00	Scoring by quarter: 17–26, 18–18, 13–21, 11–16
	Pts: Punter 12; Rebs: Satoranský 7 Asts: Satoranský 6 PIR: Satoranský 13	Boxscore	Pts: Perry 15; Rebs: Ejim 7 Asts: Díaz 6 PIR: Balcerowski 20	Arena: Palau Blaugrana; Attendance: 6,892; Referees: Emilio Pérez Pizarro, Óscar Perea, Alberto Sánchez Sixto

8 June 2025 3	Unicaja	97–95(OT)	Barça	Málaga
18:30	Scoring by quarter: 24–18, 19–24, 12–22, 29–20, Overtime: 13–11
	Pts: Perry, Taylor 16; Rebs: Pérez 7 Asts: Perry 5 PIR: Taylor 20	Boxscore	Pts: Punter 37; Rebs: Parra 7 Asts: Satoranský 6 PIR: Punter 36	Arena: Martín Carpena; Attendance: 10,681; Referees: Antonio Conde, Jordi Aliaga, Martín Caballero

=== EuroLeague ===
==== League table ====
Pos	Team	Pld	W	L	PF	PA	PD	Qualification
3	(Hellenic Basketball Federation) Panathinaikos AKTOR	34	22	12	2990	2843	+147	Qualification to playoffs
4	(French Federation of Basketball) Monaco	34	21	13	2913	2801	+112	Qualification to playoffs
5	(Spanish Basketball Federation) Barcelona	34	20	14	2966	2837	+129	Qualification to playoffs
6	(Turkish Basketball Federation) Anadolu Efes	34	20	14	2941	2788	+153	Qualification to playoffs
7	(Spanish Basketball Federation) Real Madrid	34	20	14	2870	2797	+73	Qualification to play-in

Source: EuroLeague
Rules for classification: Regular season tiebreakers

==== Results summary ====
Overall						Home					Away				
Pld	W	L	PF	PA	PD	W	L	PF	PA	PD	W	L	PF	PA	PD
34	20	14	2966	2837	+129	11	6	1482	1360	+122	9	8	1484	1477	+7

Last updated: 10 April 2025.
Source: Competitive matches

==== Results by round ====
Round	1	2	3	4	5	6	7	8	9	10	11	12	13	14	15	16	17	18	19	20	21	22	23	24	25	26	27	28	29	30	31	32	33	34
Ground	A	H	H	A	H	A	A	H	A	H	A	H	A	A	H	H	A	H	A	A	H	H	A	A	H	H	A	A	H	H	H	A	A	H
Result	L	W	W	W	W	W	L	W	W	L	L	L	L	W	L	W	L	L	W	W	W	W	L	L	W	L	L	W	W	W	L	W	W	W
Position	13	5	2	2	1	1	3	1	1	5	8	7	8	8	11	9	10	11	12	8	8	6	7	9	8	9	11	9	6	5	8	8	8	5

Source: Competitive matches
A = Away; H = Home; W = Win; L = Loss; P = Postponed

==== Matches ====
3 October 2024 1	Žalgiris (Lithuanian Basketball Federation)	74–67	(Spanish Basketball Federation) Barcelona	Kaunas
19:00	Scoring by quarter: 21–14, 22–17, 7–17, 24–19
	Pts: Francisco 19; Rebs: Mitchell 6 Asts: Francisco 3 PIR: Francisco 22	Boxscore	Pts: Laprovíttola 12; Rebs: Satoranský 7 Asts: Laprovíttola 8 PIR: Laprovíttola 20	Arena: Žalgirio Arena; Attendance: 14,962; Referees: Emin Moğulkoç, Ioannis Foufis, Josip Radojković

11 October 2024 2	Barcelona (Spanish Basketball Federation)	88–73	(German Basketball Federation) ALBA Berlin	Barcelona
20:30	Scoring by quarter: 19–16, 24–21, 20–17, 25–19
	Pts: Brizuela 18; Rebs: Anderson, Hernangómez 5 Asts: Satoranský 8 PIR: Brizuela 16	Boxscore	Pts: Hermannsson 13; Rebs: Koumadje 8 Asts: Hermannsson 5 PIR: Koumadje 17	Arena: Palau Blaugrana; Attendance: 5,785; Referees: Robert Vyklický, Borys Ryzhyk, Mario Majkić

16 October 2024 3	Barcelona (Spanish Basketball Federation)	86–71	(French Federation of Basketball) Monaco	Barcelona
20:30	Scoring by quarter: 26–18, 21–21, 24–15, 15–17
	Pts: Punter 21; Rebs: Metu 7 Asts: four players 3 PIR: Punter 20	Boxscore	Pts: Okobo 13; Rebs: Diallo 6 Asts: Okobo 7 PIR: Okobo 18	Arena: Palau Blaugrana; Attendance: 5,359; Referees: Tomislav Hordov, Anne Panther, Marcin Kowalski

18 October 2024 4	Crvena zvezda Meridianbet (Basketball Federation of Serbia)	94–98(OT)	(Spanish Basketball Federation) Barcelona	Belgrade
20:00	Scoring by quarter: 25–26, 22–18, 19–19, 18–21, Overtime: 10–14
	Pts: Yago 23; Rebs: Bolomboy 7 Asts: Teodosić 5 PIR: Yago 25	Boxscore	Pts: Punter 26; Rebs: Veselý 5 Asts: Laprovíttola 7 PIR: Punter 30	Arena: Belgrade Arena; Attendance: 20,991; Referees: Robert Lottermoser, Michele Rossi, Vasiliki Tsaroucha

25 October 2024 5	Barcelona (Spanish Basketball Federation)	90–83	(French Federation of Basketball) LDLC ASVEL	Barcelona
20:30	Scoring by quarter: 17–20, 26–24, 26–25, 21–14
	Pts: Punter 20; Rebs: Metu, Veselý 5 Asts: three players 4 PIR: Veselý 26	Boxscore	Pts: Maledon 21; Rebs: Sako 9 Asts: de Colo, Jackson 4 PIR: Sako 22	Arena: Palau Blaugrana; Attendance: 5,542; Referees: Carmelo Paternicò, Jakub Zamojski, Marko Juras

29 October 2024 6	Anadolu Efes (Turkish Basketball Federation)	88–97	(Spanish Basketball Federation) Barcelona	Istanbul
18:30	Scoring by quarter: 26–29, 25–26, 15–21, 22–21
	Pts: Thompson 16; Rebs: Nwora, Poirier 6 Asts: Thompson 6 PIR: Thompson 21	Boxscore	Pts: Metu 21; Rebs: Veselý 5 Asts: Núñez 7 PIR: Metu, Punter 20	Arena: Basketball Development Center; Attendance: 9,967; Referees: Saša Pukl, Uroš Nikolić, Steve Bittner

31 October 2024 7	Olympiacos (Hellenic Basketball Federation)	95–74	(Spanish Basketball Federation) Barcelona	Piraeus
20:15	Scoring by quarter: 21–17, 23–19, 21–14, 30–24
	Pts: Fournier 19; Rebs: Milutinov 8 Asts: Walkup 7 PIR: Vezenkov 27	Boxscore	Pts: Punter 18; Rebs: Metu 7 Asts: Satoranský 4 PIR: Punter 19	Arena: Peace and Friendship Stadium; Attendance: 12,349; Referees: Sreten Radović, Piotr Pastusiak, Sašo Petek

8 November 2024 8	Barcelona (Spanish Basketball Federation)	91–68	(Spanish Basketball Federation) Baskonia	Barcelona
20:30	Scoring by quarter: 26–17, 18–16, 18–18, 29–17
	Pts: Veselý 17; Rebs: Veselý 10; Asts: Brizuela 5 PIR: Veselý 28	Boxscore	Pts: Forrest 17; Rebs: Moneke, Hall 6 Asts: Baldwin 5 PIR: Moneke 19	Arena: Palau Blaugrana; Attendance: 5,938; Referees: Damir Javor, Borys Ryzhyk, Luka Kardum

13 November 2024 9	Partizan Mozzart Bet (Basketball Federation of Serbia)	79–87	(Spanish Basketball Federation) Barcelona	Belgrade
18:00	Scoring by quarter: 23–19, 12–30, 23–21, 21–17
	Pts: C. Jones 17; Rebs: T. Jones 8 Asts: Davies, C. Jones 3 PIR: Pokuševski 15	Boxscore	Pts: Punter 18; Rebs: Metu 8 Asts: Satoranský 9 PIR: Parker 22	Arena: Belgrade Arena; Attendance: 19,669; Referees: Emin Moğulkoç, Seffi Shemmesh, Kristaps Konstantinovs

15 November 2024 10	Barcelona (Spanish Basketball Federation)	87–103	(French Federation of Basketball) Paris Basketball	Barcelona
20:30	Scoring by quarter: 18–31, 30–14, 22–28, 17–30
	Pts: Parker 19; Rebs: Núñez 6 Asts: Punter 6 PIR: Hernangómez 21	Boxscore	Pts: Shorts 24; Rebs: Ward 7 Asts: Shorts 9 PIR: Shorts 36	Arena: Palau Blaugrana; Attendance: 6,103; Referees: Carmelo Paternicò, Gytis Vilius, Amit Balak

20 November 2024 11	Bayern Munich (German Basketball Federation)	100–78	(Spanish Basketball Federation) Barcelona	Munich
20:30	Scoring by quarter: 28–21, 20–17, 29–20, 23–20
	Pts: Obst 34; Rebs: Voigtmann 7 Asts: Napier 5 PIR: Obst 30	Boxscore	Pts: Parker 26; Rebs: Satoranský 6 Asts: Núñez 7 PIR: Parker 29	Arena: SAP Garden; Attendance: 10,823; Referees: Ilija Belošević, Milivoje Jovčić, Hugues Thépénier

28 November 2024 12	Barcelona (Spanish Basketball Federation)	90–97(OT)	(Spanish Basketball Federation) Real Madrid	Barcelona
20:45	Scoring by quarter: 17–22, 21–12, 14–20, 22–20, Overtime: 10–10, 6–13
	Pts: Punter 27; Rebs: Veselý 8 Asts: Brizuela, Punter 4 PIR: Veselý 26	Boxscore	Pts: Tavares 24; Rebs: Tavares 18; Asts: Campazzo 10; PIR: Tavares 39	Arena: Palau Blaugrana; Attendance: 7,572; Referees: Saša Pukl, Piotr Pastusiak, Saulius Račys

3 December 2024 13	Panathinaikos AKTOR (Hellenic Basketball Federation)	90–89	(Spanish Basketball Federation) Barcelona	Marousi
20:15	Scoring by quarter: 25–19, 20–26, 18–24, 27–20
	Pts: Nunn 29; Rebs: Lessort 8 Asts: Sloukas 6 PIR: Lessort 27	Boxscore	Pts: Núñez 19; Rebs: Parker 7 Asts: Punter, Veselý 4 PIR: Núñez 21	Arena: OAKA Altion; Attendance: 16,780; Referees: Damir Javor, Carmelo Paternicò, Luka Kardum

5 December 2024 14	Maccabi Playtika Tel Aviv (Israeli Basketball Association)	86–88	(Spanish Basketball Federation) Barcelona	Belgrade (Note: Since 24 October 2023, Maccabi Playtika Tel Aviv play their home matches in Belgrade due to the inability to host matches in Israel as a result of the Gaza war until further notice.)
20:05	Scoring by quarter: 16–22, 28–15, 22–27, 20–24
	Pts: Hoard 20; Rebs: Hoard 8 Asts: Blatt 10; PIR: Hoard 26	Boxscore	Pts: Parker, Punter 28; Rebs: Parker, Hernangómez 9 Asts: Satoranský 8 PIR: Parker 24	Arena: Aleksandar Nikolić Hall; Attendance: 164; Referees: Sreten Radović, Sašo Petek, Jurgis Laurinavičius

13 December 2024 15	Barcelona (Spanish Basketball Federation)	81–94	(Italian Basketball Federation) EA7 Emporio Armani Milan	Barcelona
20:30	Scoring by quarter: 24–16, 19–24, 17–36, 21–18
	Pts: Punter 21; Rebs: Punter 6 Asts: Satoranský 5 PIR: Punter 24	Boxscore	Pts: LeDay 33; Rebs: Mirotić 7 Asts: Mannion 6 PIR: LeDay 37	Arena: Palau Blaugrana; Attendance: 5,496; Referees: Mehdi Difallah, Milan Nedović, Thomas Bissuel

17 December 2024 16	Barcelona (Spanish Basketball Federation)	90–63	(Turkish Basketball Federation) Fenerbahçe Beko	Barcelona
20:30	Scoring by quarter: 20–12, 24–25, 21–16, 25–10
	Pts: Punter 25; Rebs: Parker 7 Asts: Satoranský, Punter 5 PIR: Punter 32	Boxscore	Pts: Colson 15; Rebs: Birch 6 Asts: three players 2 PIR: Colson, Birch 22	Arena: Palau Blaugrana; Attendance: 5,974; Referees: Tomislav Hordov, Rain Peerandi, Steve Bittner

20 December 2024 17	Virtus Segafredo Bologna (Italian Basketball Federation)	86–81	(Spanish Basketball Federation) Barcelona	Bologna
20:00	Scoring by quarter: 23–15, 12–19, 30–31, 21–16
	Pts: Cordinier 24; Rebs: Žižić 11; Asts: Pajola, Cordinier 7 PIR: Cordinier 38	Boxscore	Pts: Parker 21; Rebs: Punter 6 Asts: Satoranský 8 PIR: Parker 22	Arena: Segafredo Arena; Attendance: 8,335; Referees: Borys Ryzhyk, Gytis Vilius, Mario Majkić

27 December 2024 18	Barcelona (Spanish Basketball Federation)	74–78	(Basketball Federation of Serbia) Crvena zvezda Meridianbet	Barcelona
20:30	Scoring by quarter: 15–19, 20–15, 24–22, 15–22
	Pts: Metu 16; Rebs: Metu 6 Asts: Satoranský 8 PIR: Metu 21	Boxscore	Pts: Petrušev 17; Rebs: Bolomboy 9 Asts: Yago, Miller-McIntyre 3 PIR: Petrušev 19	Arena: Palau Blaugrana; Attendance: 6,596; Referees: Emin Moğulkoç, Carmelo Paternicò, Jakub Zamojski

3 January 2025 19	Paris Basketball (French Federation of Basketball)	79–90	(Spanish Basketball Federation) Barcelona	Paris
20:15	Scoring by quarter: 19–25, 17–15, 19–25, 24–25
	Pts: Shorts 20; Rebs: Hayes, Malcolm 5 Asts: Shorts 4 PIR: Shorts 22	Boxscore	Pts: Hernangómez 23; Rebs: Hernangómez 10; Asts: Satoranský 8 PIR: Hernangómez 30	Arena: Accor Arena; Attendance: 15,356; Referees: Sreten Radović, Uroš Nikolić, Manuel Attard

9 January 2025 20	Monaco (French Federation of Basketball)	84–98	(Spanish Basketball Federation) Barcelona	Fontvieille
19:00	Scoring by quarter: 17–25, 24–20, 19–21, 24–32
	Pts: James 23; Rebs: Papagiannis 7 Asts: James 8 PIR: James 24	Boxscore	Pts: Brizuela 27; Rebs: Metu 8 Asts: Satoranský 6 PIR: Brizuela 25	Arena: Salle Gaston Médecin; Attendance: 4,086; Referees: Ilija Belošević, Miloš Koljenšić, Luka Kardum

15 January 2025 21	Barcelona (Spanish Basketball Federation)	82–73	(Hellenic Basketball Federation) Panathinaikos AKTOR	Barcelona
20:30	Scoring by quarter: 18–21, 12–17, 29–12, 23–23
	Pts: Parker 25; Rebs: Parker 8 Asts: Satoranský 7 PIR: Parker 27	Boxscore	Pts: Grant 18; Rebs: Hernangómez 10; Asts: Nunn 5 PIR: Osman 20	Arena: Palau Blaugrana; Attendance: 6,523; Referees: Emin Moğulkoç, Jakub Zamojski, Saulius Račys

17 January 2025 22	Barcelona (Spanish Basketball Federation)	90–80	(Turkish Basketball Federation) Anadolu Efes	Barcelona
20:30	Scoring by quarter: 22–24, 26–17, 17–18, 25–21
	Pts: Punter 15; Rebs: Metu 6 Asts: Satoranský 7 PIR: Núñez 17	Boxscore	Pts: Bryant 16; Rebs: Poirier 5 Asts: Thompson 6 PIR: Bryant 18	Arena: Palau Blaugrana; Attendance: 6,343; Referees: Damir Javor, Milivoje Jovčić, Tomasz Trawicki

24 January 2025 23	LDLC ASVEL (French Federation of Basketball)	100–94	(Spanish Basketball Federation) Barcelona	Décines-Charpieu
20:00	Scoring by quarter: 23–21, 25–21, 28–27, 24–25
	Pts: Maledon 18; Rebs: Roberson, Sako 6 Asts: Maledon 9 PIR: Maledon 29	Boxscore	Pts: Punter 19; Rebs: three players 4 Asts: Punter, Satoranský 6 PIR: Punter 25	Arena: LDLC Arena; Attendance: 10,429; Referees: Saša Pukl, Gytis Vilius, Kristaps Konstantinovs

30 January 2025 24	Baskonia (Spanish Basketball Federation)	88–86	(Spanish Basketball Federation) Barcelona	Vitoria-Gasteiz
20:30	Scoring by quarter: 23–25, 21–21, 21–18, 23–22
	Pts: Moneke 22; Rebs: Moneke 9 Asts: Forrest 6 PIR: Moneke 34	Boxscore	Pts: Metu 14; Rebs: Hernangómez 5 Asts: Satoranský 5 PIR: Metu, Satoranský 18	Arena: Buesa Arena; Attendance: 10,163; Referees: Emin Moğulkoç, Uroš Nikolić, Artūras Šukys

5 February 2025 25	Barcelona (Spanish Basketball Federation)	100–71	(Israeli Basketball Association) Maccabi Playtika Tel Aviv	Barcelona
20:30	Scoring by quarter: 28–26, 14–10, 32–24, 26–11
	Pts: Punter 28; Rebs: Hernangómez 7 Asts: Núñez 8 PIR: Hernangómez, Punter 23	Boxscore	Pts: Rivero 16; Rebs: Rivero 7 Asts: Blatt 7 PIR: Rivero 21	Arena: Palau Blaugrana; Attendance: 5,297; Referees: Robert Lottermoser, Ioannis Foufis, Gentian Cici

7 February 2025 26	Barcelona (Spanish Basketball Federation)	88–90	(Hellenic Basketball Federation) Olympiacos	Barcelona
20:30	Scoring by quarter: 18–22, 29–23, 18–21, 23–24
	Pts: Punter 20; Rebs: Satoranský 6 Asts: Punter 7 PIR: Punter 31	Boxscore	Pts: Vezenkov 24; Rebs: Papanikolaou, Vezenkov 5 Asts: Williams-Goss 5 PIR: Vezenkov 30	Arena: Palau Blaugrana; Attendance: 7,030; Referees: Damir Javor, Jakub Zamojski, Sergio Silva

27 February 2025 27	Real Madrid (Spanish Basketball Federation)	96–91	(Spanish Basketball Federation) Barcelona	Madrid
20:45	Scoring by quarter: 23–25, 17–18, 30–24, 26–24
	Pts: Hezonja 19; Rebs: Hezonja 8 Asts: Abalde 5 PIR: Musa 24	Boxscore	Pts: Parra 20; Rebs: Parra, Anderson 7 Asts: Satoranský 4 PIR: Anderson 26	Arena: Movistar Arena; Attendance: 12,130; Referees: Ilija Belošević, Borys Ryzhyk, Miloš Koljenšić

7 March 2025 28	ALBA Berlin (German Basketball Federation)	85–99	(Spanish Basketball Federation) Barcelona	Berlin
20:30	Scoring by quarter: 20–18, 19–23, 25–25, 21–33
	Pts: Wetzell 15; Rebs: McCormack 5 Asts: McDowell-White 6 PIR: McCormack 14	Boxscore	Pts: Parker 21; Rebs: Metu 7 Asts: Satoranský 12; PIR: Parker 22	Arena: Uber Arena; Attendance: 13,591; Referees: Carmelo Paternicò, Ioannis Foufis, Tomasz Trawicki

14 March 2025 29	Barcelona (Spanish Basketball Federation)	87–80	(Basketball Federation of Serbia) Partizan Mozzart Bet	Barcelona
20:45	Scoring by quarter: 25–32, 29–9, 19–26, 14–13
	Pts: Punter 25; Rebs: Hernangómez 8 Asts: Punter 4 PIR: Punter 29	Boxscore	Pts: Brown, Mike 16; Rebs: T. Jones 9 Asts: C. Jones 9 PIR: Mike 19	Arena: Palau Blaugrana; Attendance: 6,551; Referees: Emin Moğulkoç, Piotr Pastusiak, Rain Peerandi

21 March 2025 30	Barcelona (Spanish Basketball Federation)	82–70	(Lithuanian Basketball Federation) Žalgiris	Barcelona
20:30	Scoring by quarter: 16–20, 20–11, 23–20, 23–19
	Pts: Brizuela 20; Rebs: Metu 8 Asts: three players 3 PIR: Anderson 24	Boxscore	Pts: three players 13; Rebs: Ulanovas 7 Asts: Francisco 5 PIR: Brazdeikis 15	Arena: Palau Blaugrana; Attendance: 6,443; Referees: Ilija Belošević, Tomislav Hordov, Hüseyin Çelik

25 March 2025 31	Barcelona (Spanish Basketball Federation)	101–102	(German Basketball Federation) Bayern Munich	Barcelona
20:30	Scoring by quarter: 28–30, 27–26, 22–20, 24–26
	Pts: Parker 23; Rebs: Hernangómez 14; Asts: Satoranský 6 PIR: Hernangómez 24	Boxscore	Pts: Edwards 23; Rebs: Voigtmann 5 Asts: Edwards 5 PIR: Edwards 21	Arena: Palau Blaugrana; Attendance: 6,266; Referees: Mehdi Difallah, Oļegs Latiševs, Tomasz Trawicki

27 March 2025 32	EA7 Emporio Armani Milan (Italian Basketball Federation)	88–98	(Spanish Basketball Federation) Barcelona	Assago
20:30	Scoring by quarter: 21–25, 23–30, 19–19, 25–24
	Pts: Mirotić 28; Rebs: Mirotić 9 Asts: Mannion 8 PIR: Mirotić 32	Boxscore	Pts: Brizuela 27; Rebs: Parra 7 Asts: four players 3 PIR: Brizuela 25	Arena: Unipol Forum; Attendance: 10,742; Referees: Ilija Belošević, Luka Kardum, Eduard Udyanskyy

2 April 2025 33	Fenerbahçe Beko (Turkish Basketball Federation)	75–83	(Spanish Basketball Federation) Barcelona	Istanbul
19:45	Scoring by quarter: 23–21, 27–18, 16–23, 9–21
	Pts: Hayes-Davis 20; Rebs: Hayes-Davis 8 Asts: Gudurić 4 PIR: Hayes-Davis 23	Boxscore	Pts: Parker 24; Rebs: Parra 12; Asts: Satoranský 7 PIR: Parker 27	Arena: Ülker Sports and Event Hall; Attendance: 10,431; Referees: Sreten Radović, Milan Nedović, Saulius Račys

11 April 2025 34	Barcelona (Spanish Basketball Federation)	91–87	(Italian Basketball Federation) Virtus Segafredo Bologna	Barcelona
20:15	Scoring by quarter: 23–16, 22–22, 26–27, 20–22
	Pts: Punter 20; Rebs: Hernangómez 7 Asts: Satoranský 9 PIR: Punter 22	Boxscore	Pts: Shengelia 17; Rebs: Polonara 6 Asts: Pajola 6 PIR: Holiday 16	Arena: Palau Blaugrana; Attendance: 6,955; Referees: Robert Lottermoser, Jakub Zamojski, Rain Peerandi

=== EuroLeague Playoffs ===
==== Playoff series ====
23 April 2025 1	Monaco (French Federation of Basketball)	97–80	(Spanish Basketball Federation) Barcelona	Fontvieille
20:30	Scoring by quarter: 21–25, 23–17, 32–17, 21–21
	Pts: Theis, James 22; Rebs: Tarpey 6 Asts: Okobo 7 PIR: Okobo 26	Boxscore	Pts: Punter 16; Rebs: Fall 14; Asts: Veselý 3 PIR: Fall 25	Arena: Salle Gaston Médecin; Attendance: 5,000; Referees: Emin Moğulkoç, Piotr Pastusiak, Miloš Koljenšić

25 April 2025 2	Monaco (French Federation of Basketball)	92–79	(Spanish Basketball Federation) Barcelona	Fontvieille
19:00 CEST	Scoring by quarter: 26–19, 23–21, 31–24, 12–15
	Pts: Diallo 21; Rebs: Diallo 6 Asts: Okobo 8 PIR: Jaiteh 27	Boxscore	Pts: Parker 16; Rebs: Parker 9 Asts: Parker 6 PIR: Parker 21	Arena: Salle Gaston Médecin; Attendance: 5,000; Referees: Robert Lottermoser, Milivoje Jovčić, Michele Rossi

29 April 2025 3	Barcelona (Spanish Basketball Federation)	100–89	(French Federation of Basketball) Monaco	Barcelona
21:00	Scoring by quarter: 24–27, 27–12, 23–27, 26–23
	Pts: Hernangómez 19; Rebs: Hernangómez 10; Asts: Satoranský 7 PIR: Hernangómez 31	Boxscore	Pts: James 20; Rebs: Theis, Blossomgame 6 Asts: James 12; PIR: James 33	Arena: Palau Blaugrana; Attendance: 5,807; Referees: Saša Pukl, Carmelo Paternicò, Saulius Račys

2 May 2025 4	Barcelona (Spanish Basketball Federation)	79–72	(French Federation of Basketball) Monaco	Barcelona
20:45 CEST	Scoring by quarter: 23–14, 12–24, 23–20, 21–14
	Pts: Parker 22; Rebs: Fall 8 Asts: Satoranský 7 PIR: three players 15	Boxscore	Pts: James 16; Rebs: Theis 6 Asts: James 5 PIR: James 19	Arena: Palau Blaugrana; Attendance: 7,018; Referees: Robert Lottermoser, Emin Moğulkoç, Tomislav Hordov

6 May 2025 5	Monaco (French Federation of Basketball)	85–84	(Spanish Basketball Federation) Barcelona	Fontvieille
19:00 CEST	Scoring by quarter: 15–19, 30–20, 20–23, 20–22
	Pts: James 20; Rebs: Blossomgame 6 Asts: James 5 PIR: Papagiannis 21	Boxscore	Pts: Punter 19; Rebs: Fall 10; Asts: Brizuela, Satoranský 5 PIR: Punter 23	Arena: Salle Gaston Médecin; Attendance: 5,000; Referees: Ilija Belošević, Milan Nedović, Gytis Vilius

=== Copa del Rey ===
==== Quarterfinals ====
13 February 2025	La Laguna Tenerife	91–86	FC Barcelona	Las Palmas
21:30	Scoring by quarter: 23–33, 24–21, 19–19, 25–13
	Pts: Huertas 22; Rebs: Huertas 6 Asts: Fitipaldo 7 PIR: Guerra 31	Boxscore	Pts: Satoranský 17; Rebs: Fall, Parra 6 Asts: Satoranský 7 PIR: Satoranský 20	Arena: Gran Canaria Arena; Attendance: 9,152; Referees: Emilio Pérez Pizarro, Carlos Cortés, Iyán González

=== Supercopa de España ===
==== Semifinals ====
21 September 2024	Real Madrid	89–83	FC Barcelona	Murcia
18:30	Scoring by quarter: 20–18, 21–24, 26–19, 22–22
	Pts: Campazzo 18; Rebs: Deck 10; Asts: Campazzo 6 PIR: Campazzo 33	Boxscore	Pts: Parker 17; Rebs: Metu 6 Asts: Laprovíttola 8 PIR: Parker 17	Arena: Palacio de Deportes; Attendance: 7,400; Referees: Carlos Peruga, Fernando Calatrava, Luis Miguel Castillo

== Statistics ==
Legend
GP	Games played	GS	Games started	MPG	Minutes per game
FG%	Field-goal percentage	3FG%	3-point field-goal percentage	FT%	Free-throw percentage
RPG	Rebounds per game	APG	Assists per game	SPG	Steals per game
BPG	Blocks per game	PPG	Points per game	PIR	PIR per game

=== Liga ACB ===
Player	GP	GS	MPG	FG%	3FG%	FT%	RPG	APG	SPG	BPG	PPG	PIR
Álex Abrines	34	11	17.1	.420	.379	.944	2.2	0.8	0.6	0.2	5.4	5.4
Justin Anderson	33	17	19.3	.489	.474	.879	2.6	0.7	0.3	0.3	8.3	7.9
Darío Brizuela	35	12	18.8	.458	.344	.855	1.6	2.8	0.6	0.0	9.6	9.2
Artūras Butajevas	1	0	0.4	.000	.000	.000	0.0	0.0	0.0	0.0	0	0
Youssoupha Fall	33	24	13.5	.618	.000	.673	4.2	0.2	0.2	0.4	5.6	7.3
Dani González	2	0	6.7	.000	.000	.000	1.5	0.0	0.5	0.0	0	-0.5
Mathieu Grujicic	3	0	4.0	.000	.000	.000	0.0	0.0	0.0	0.0	0.0	-1.3
Willy Hernangómez	33	7	16.2	.560	.000	.598	5.2	0.8	0.4	0.3	8.0	11.7
Sayon Keita	6	0	2.6	.000	.000	.250	0.5	0.0	0.0	0.2	0.2	0.2
Nicolás Laprovíttola	4	1	20.2	.440	.385	.667	2.2	5.2	0.2	0.0	7.8	9.8
Chimezie Metu	20	2	20.0	.617	.431	.660	3.8	1.0	0.6	0.6	13.2	14.0
Juan Núñez	20	5	17.0	.412	.225	.750	3.1	3.4	0.8	0.0	5.0	7.6
Jabari Parker	36	34	24.4	.509	.475	.782	3.8	1.3	0.7	0.4	12.9	12.7
Joel Parra	33	11	21.4	.520	.366	.897	4.2	1.1	1.0	0.2	8.5	11.7
Kevin Punter	35	20	23.0	.488	.462	.908	1.8	2.2	0.9	0.1	14.1	13.1
Dame Sarr	12	5	12.7	.521	.429	.556	1.7	0.7	0.2	0.2	5.8	4.2
Tomáš Satoranský	36	29	22.6	.465	.342	.756	3.2	4.4	0.8	0.1	8.1	11.5
Jan Veselý	15	5	16.7	.559	.300	.914	2.7	2.1	0.3	0.2	7.4	8.1
Raúl Villar	16	2	9.2	.414	.556	.700	1.0	1.1	0.6	0.0	2.4	2.9

Last updated: April 15, 2026.
Source: ACB

=== EuroLeague ===
Player	GP	GS	MPG	FG%	3FG%	FT%	RPG	APG	SPG	BPG	PPG	PIR
Álex Abrines	37	18	17.0	.405	.379	.913	2.1	0.7	0.5	0.1	4.5	4.2
Justin Anderson	37	18	19.5	.538	.413	.881	2.8	1.4	0.3	0.3	7.1	8.5
Darío Brizuela	36	0	18.3	.494	.460	.796	1.4	2.2	0.4	0.1	10.0	8.4
Youssoupha Fall	29	18	10.4	.701	.000	.667	3.3	0.0	0.1	0.2	4.4	5.2
Mathieu Grujicic	2	0	1.1	.500	.000	.500	0.5	0.0	0.0	0.0	1.5	1.0
Willy Hernangómez	34	8	15.8	.637	.000	.673	4.1	0.5	0.6	0.1	8.2	10.8
Nicolás Laprovíttola	4	0	22.0	.560	.538	.625	1.0	6.2	1.0	0.0	10.0	13.2
Chimezie Metu	24	2	20.0	.551	.364	.750	4.8	1.0	0.6	0.6	11.0	11.8
Raul Neto	2	0	3.5	.667	1.000	.000	1.0	0.5	0.0	0.0	2.5	4.0
Juan Núñez	25	5	15.5	.442	.275	.650	2.5	3.4	0.8	0.0	5.0	7.4
Jabari Parker	39	38	27.2	.478	.383	.794	4.0	1.7	0.8	0.2	13.8	12.4
Joel Parra	31	6	14.9	.466	.239	.773	2.8	0.6	0.6	0.1	4.9	5.5
Kevin Punter	37	33	27.0	.499	.386	.944	2.2	3.0	1.3	0.0	16.6	16.5
Dame Sarr	15	2	5.1	.579	.500	.167	0.7	0.6	0.4	0.1	1.8	2.1
Tomáš Satoranský	39	34	23.7	.446	.347	.675	3.2	5.3	0.9	0.1	5.9	9.7
Jan Veselý	24	13	21.1	.554	.500	.761	3.6	1.9	1.1	0.5	9.0	11.6
Raúl Villar	6	0	2.2	.500	.000	.250	0.0	0.0	0.0	0.0	0.5	-0.2

Last updated: April 15, 2026.
Source: EuroLeague

== Individual awards ==
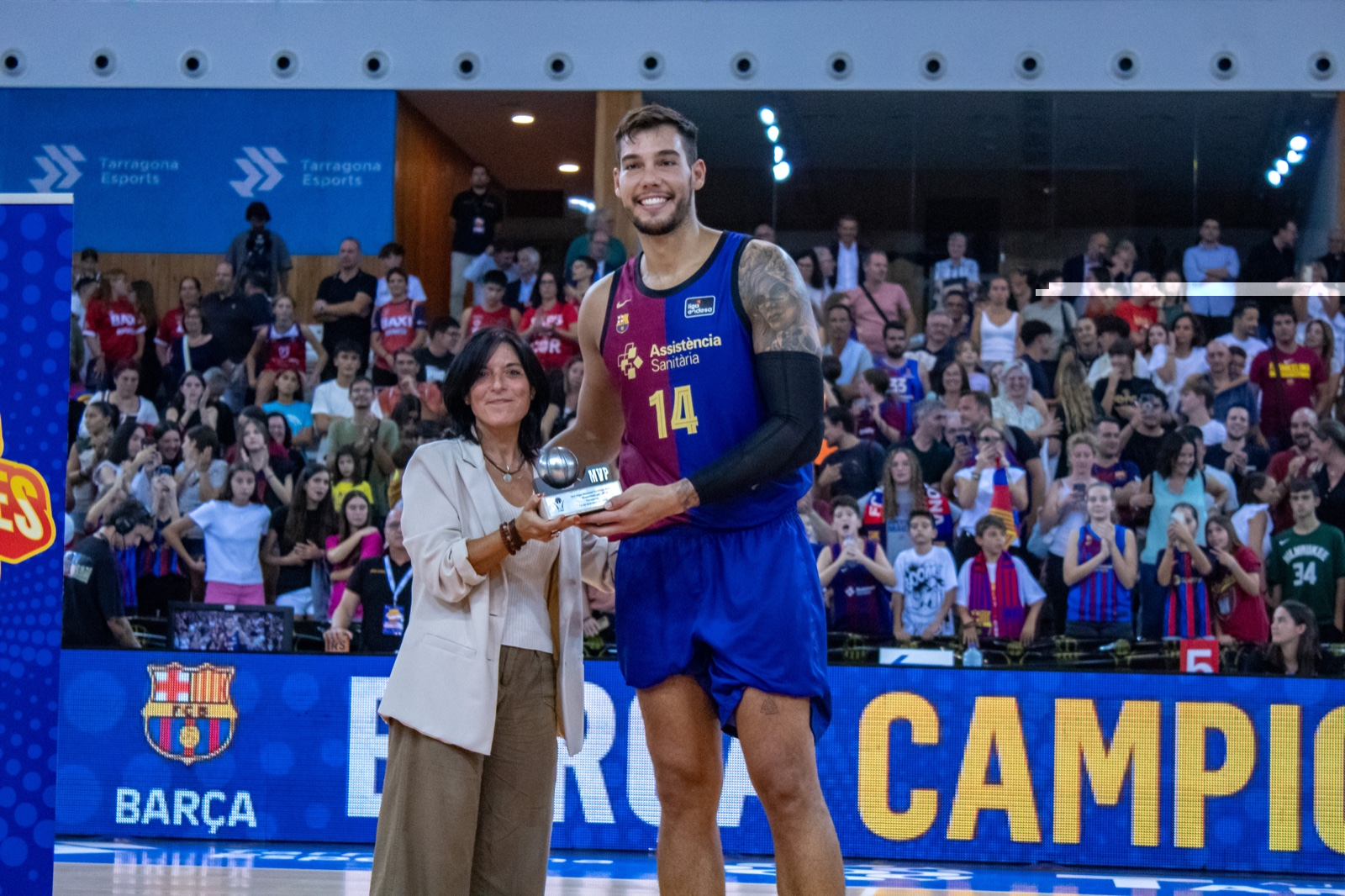
Hernangómez winning the MVP trophy of the 2024 Catalan Basketball League final

=== Lliga Catalana ===
Finals MVP

- (Spain) Willy Hernangómez

=== Liga ACB ===
All-Liga ACB Second Team

- (United States) Jabari Parker

Player of the Round

- (United States) Justin Anderson – Round 14

=== EuroLeague ===
MVP of the Round

- (Czech Republic) Jan Veselý – Round 8
- (Spain) Willy Hernangómez – Game 3 of the Playoffs

MVP of the Month

- (United States) Kevin Punter – October
