= Ade Murkey =

American basketball player (born 1998)

Free agent
- Position: Small forward

Personal information
- Born: January 29, 1998 (age 28) Minneapolis, Minnesota, U.S.
- Listed height: 6 ft 5 in (1.96 m)
- Listed weight: 200 lb (91 kg)

Career information
- High school: St. Croix Lutheran (West St. Paul, Minnesota)
- College: Denver (2016–2020)
- NBA draft: 2020: undrafted
- Playing career: 2021–present

Career history
- 2021: Iowa Wolves
- 2021: Stockton Kings
- 2021–2022: Sacramento Kings
- 2022: Stockton Kings
- 2024–2025: Wisconsin Herd
- 2025–2026: Álftanes
- 2026: Tindastóll

Career highlights
- Second-team All-Summit League (2020)
- Stats at NBA.com
- Stats at Basketball Reference

Ade Taqiyy Henry Murkey (born January 29, 1998) is an American professional basketball. He played college basketball for the Denver Pioneers.

== High school career ==
Murkey attended St. Croix Lutheran where he led the Crusaders to a 29–3 record as a senior, averaging 22 points, 9.9 rebounds, 4.2 assists and 2.0 steals per game and setting the single season scoring record, while also becoming the school's all-time leader in assists and steals. For this, he was named to the Minnesota AP Boys' Basketball Third Team All-State.

== College career ==
Murkey played college basketball for Denver, seeing action in 118 career games, starting 88, while averaging 10.6 points, 4.0 rebounds and 2.0 assists per game. As a senior, he averaged 18.6 points and 6.3 rebounds per game and was named to the 2020 All-Summit League Second Team. His best game came on February 14, 2020, when he scored a Denver Division I program record 42 points against South Dakota State.

== Professional career ==
=== Iowa Wolves (2021) ===
After going undrafted in the 2020 NBA draft, Murkey signed on December 3, 2020, an Exhibit 10 deal with the Minnesota Timberwolves and was waived on December 19, after one preseason appearance. On January 25, 2021, he signed as an affiliate player with the Iowa Wolves of the NBA G League, where he played 13 games and averaged 7.1 points, 2.3 rebounds and 0.9 assists in 21.7 minutes per game.

=== Stockton / Sacramento Kings (2021–2022) ===
On October 13, 2021, Murkey signed with the Sacramento Kings, but was waived three days later. He subsequently joined the Stockton Kings on November 2. In 12 games, he averaged 11.8 points, 3.0 rebounds and 1.7 steals per game.

On December 22, 2021, Murkey signed a 10-day contract with the Sacramento Kings. He made his debut the same day against the Los Angeles Clippers, accumulating no points, rebounds or assists in one minute of action.

On January 1, 2022, Murkey was reacquired and activated by the Stockton Kings after the 10-day contract expired.

Murkey joined the Sacramento Kings for the 2022 NBA Summer League. On October 24, 2022, he re-signed with the Stockton Kings, however, he did not make the final roster.

=== Wisconsin Herd (2024–2025) ===
On October 28, 2024, Murkey joined the Wisconsin Herd.

=== Álftanes ===
In September 2025, Murkey joined Álftanes.

== Career statistics ==
Legend
GP	Games played	GS	Games started	MPG	Minutes per game
FG%	Field goal percentage	3P%	3-point field goal percentage	FT%	Free throw percentage
RPG	Rebounds per game	APG	Assists per game	SPG	Steals per game
BPG	Blocks per game	PPG	Points per game	**Bold**	Career high

=== NBA ===
Year	Team	GP	GS	MPG	FG%	3P%	FT%	RPG	APG	SPG	BPG	PPG
2021–22	Sacramento	1	0	1.0	—	—	—	.0	.0	.0	.0	.0
Career		1	0	1.0	—	—	—	.0	.0	.0	.0	.0

=== College ===
Year	Team	GP	GS	MPG	FG%	3P%	FT%	RPG	APG	SPG	BPG	PPG
2016–17	Denver	27	2	10.6	**.494**	.200	**.800**	1.6	.9	.5	.2	4.1
2017–18	Denver	30	29	24.8	.426	.125	.642	4.2	**2.7**	.7	.4	7.5
2018–19	Denver	30	26	24.4	.475	.350	.774	3.6	2.1	.8	.2	11.3
2019–20	Denver	**31**	**31**	**32.3**	.481	**.400**	.731	**6.3**	2.1	**1.2**	**.7**	**18.6**
Career		118	88	23.4	.469	.353	.731	4.0	2.0	.8	.4	10.6

== Personal life ==
Murkey is the son of Zayed and Cliff, his stepfather and has one sister, Kai Washington. His stepfather, Cliff, played college basketball at New Mexico State.
