= 2021–22 Sacramento Kings season =

- Head coach: Luke Walton (fired); Alvin Gentry (interim)
- President: John Rinehart
- General manager: Monte McNair
- Owner: Vivek Ranadivé
- Arena: Golden 1 Center

Results
- Record: 30–52 (.366)
- Place: Division: 5th (Pacific); Conference: 12th (Western)
- Playoff finish: Did not qualify
- Stats at Basketball Reference

Local media
- Television: NBC Sports California; CBS 13
- Radio: KHTK Sports 1140

The 2021–22 Sacramento Kings season was the 77th season for the franchise in the National Basketball Association (NBA), and 38th season in the city of Sacramento. The Kings entered the season with the longest NBA playoff appearance drought in league history with 15 seasons, tying the record with the Los Angeles Clippers. The last time the team had qualified for the playoffs was in 2006. In the 2021 NBA draft, the Kings selected Davion Mitchell from Baylor University with the ninth pick.

On November 22, head coach Luke Walton was fired after a mediocre 6–11 start; he was then replaced by Alvin Gentry on an interim basis. For the 16th season in a row, the Sacramento Kings failed to reach the Playoffs, and thus passing the Clippers for the longest playoff drought in NBA history. Following the season, the Kings' fired Gentry as head coach.

== Draft picks ==
Round	Pick	Player	Position	Nationality	College / Club
1	9	Davion Mitchell	PG	United States	Baylor (Jr.)
2	39	Neemias Queta	C	Portugal	Utah State (Jr.)

The Kings entered the draft with one first-round pick and one second-round pick.

== Roster ==
2021–22 Sacramento Kings roster
Players

Pos.	No.	Player	Height	Weight	DOB	From
F	40	Harrison Barnes	6 ft 8 in (2.03 m)	225 lb (102 kg)	1992-05-30	North Carolina
G	3	Terence Davis	6 ft 4 in (1.93 m)	201 lb (91 kg)	1997-05-16	Mississippi
G	0	Donte DiVincenzo	6 ft 4 in (1.93 m)	203 lb (92 kg)	1997-01-31	Villanova
G	5	De'Aaron Fox	6 ft 3 in (1.91 m)	185 lb (84 kg)	1997-12-20	Kentucky
G/F	8	Maurice Harkless	6 ft 7 in (2.01 m)	220 lb (100 kg)	1993-05-11	St. John's
G	9	Justin Holiday	6 ft 6 in (1.98 m)	180 lb (82 kg)	1989-04-05	Washington
F	22	Richaun Holmes	6 ft 10 in (2.08 m)	235 lb (107 kg)	1993-10-15	Bowling Green
G/F	55	Josh Jackson	6 ft 8 in (2.03 m)	207 lb (94 kg)	1997-02-10	Kansas
C	30	Damian Jones	7 ft 0 in (2.13 m)	245 lb (111 kg)	1995-06-30	Vanderbilt
G	26	Jeremy Lamb	6 ft 5 in (1.96 m)	180 lb (82 kg)	1992-05-30	Connecticut
C	25	Alex Len	7 ft 2 in (2.18 m)	250 lb (113 kg)	1993-06-16	Maryland
F	41	Trey Lyles	6 ft 9 in (2.06 m)	234 lb (106 kg)	1995-11-05	Kentucky
F/C	7	Chimezie Metu	6 ft 11 in (2.11 m)	225 lb (102 kg)	1997-03-22	USC
G	15	Davion Mitchell	6 ft 0 in (1.83 m)	202 lb (92 kg)	1998-09-05	Baylor
C	88	Neemias Queta (TW)	7 ft 0 in (2.13 m)	248 lb (112 kg)	1999-07-13	Utah State
C	10	Domantas Sabonis	7 ft 1 in (2.16 m)	240 lb (109 kg)	1996-05-03	Gonzaga

Coaches
Head coach
- Alvin Gentry
Assistant(s)
- Doug Christie
- Jonah Herscu
- Rico Hines
- Mike Longabardi
- Roy Rana

Legend
- (DP) Unsigned draft pick
- (FA) Free agent
- (S) Suspended
- (GL) On assignment to G League affiliate
- (TW) Two-way affiliate player
- Injured

Roster
Updated: April 11, 2022

== Standings ==
=== Division ===
Pacific Division	W	L	PCT	GB	Home	Road	Div	GP
z – Phoenix Suns	64	18	.780	–	32‍–‍9	32‍–‍9	10–6	82
x – Golden State Warriors	53	29	.646	11.0	31‍–‍10	22‍–‍19	12–4	82
pi – Los Angeles Clippers	42	40	.512	22.0	25‍–‍16	17‍–‍24	9–7	82
Los Angeles Lakers	33	49	.402	31.0	21‍–‍20	12‍–‍29	3–13	82
Sacramento Kings	30	52	.366	34.0	16‍–‍25	14‍–‍27	6–10	82

=== Conference ===
Western Conference
#	Team	W	L	PCT	GB	GP
1	z – Phoenix Suns *	64	18	.780	–	82
2	y – Memphis Grizzlies *	56	26	.683	8.0	82
3	x – Golden State Warriors	53	29	.646	11.0	82
4	x – Dallas Mavericks	52	30	.634	12.0	82
5	y – Utah Jazz *	49	33	.598	15.0	82
6	x – Denver Nuggets	48	34	.585	16.0	82
7	x – Minnesota Timberwolves	46	36	.561	18.0	82
8	pi – Los Angeles Clippers	42	40	.512	22.0	82
9	x – New Orleans Pelicans	36	46	.439	28.0	82
10	pi − San Antonio Spurs	34	48	.415	30.0	82
11	Los Angeles Lakers	33	49	.402	31.0	82
12	Sacramento Kings	30	52	.366	34.0	82
13	Portland Trail Blazers	27	55	.329	37.0	82
14	Oklahoma City Thunder	24	58	.293	40.0	82
15	Houston Rockets	20	62	.244	44.0	82

== Game log ==
=== Preseason ===
2021 preseason game log
Total: 4–0 (Home: 2–0; Road: 2–0)
Preseason: 4–0 (home: 2–0; road: 2–0)

Game	Date	Team	Score	High points	High rebounds	High assists	Location Attendance	Record
1	October 4	Phoenix	W 117–106	Harrison Barnes (18)	Richaun Holmes (8)	Tyrese Haliburton (5)	Golden 1 Center; N/A (Note: Spectators were in attendance, but the exact number was not reported.)	1–0
2	October 6	@ L.A. Clippers	W 113–98	De'Aaron Fox (23)	Tristan Thompson (11)	Tyrese Haliburton (5)	Staples Center; 8,122	2–0
3	October 11	@ Portland	W 107–93	Davion Mitchell (20)	Chimezie Metu (7)	De'Aaron Fox (5)	Moda Center; N/A	3–0
4	October 14	L.A. Lakers	W 116–112	De'Aaron Fox (21)	Richaun Holmes (10)	De'Aaron Fox (5)	Golden 1 Center; N/A	4–0

2021–22 season schedule

=== Regular season ===
2021–22 game log
Total: 29–51 (Home: 16–25; Road: 13–26)
October: 3–3 (home: 0–2; road: 3–1)

Game	Date	Team	Score	High points	High rebounds	High assists	Location Attendance	Record
1	October 20	@ Portland	W 124–121	Harrison Barnes (36)	Richaun Holmes (11)	De'Aaron Fox (8)	Moda Center; 17,467	1–0
2	October 22	Utah	L 101–110	Harrison Barnes (25)	Harrison Barnes (15)	Tyrese Haliburton (6)	Golden 1 Center; 17,583	1–1
3	October 24	Golden State	L 107–119	Harrison Barnes (24)	Richaun Holmes (11)	Tyrese Haliburton (9)	Golden 1 Center; 13,876	1–2
4	October 27	@ Phoenix	W 110–107	Buddy Hield (26)	Richaun Holmes (12)	De'Aaron Fox (9)	Footprint Center; 14,678	2–2
5	October 29	@ New Orleans	W 113–109	De'Aaron Fox (23)	Harrison Barnes (12)	Tyrese Haliburton (8)	Smoothie King Center; 17,507	3–2
6	October 31	@ Dallas	L 99–105	Richaun Holmes (22)	Richaun Holmes (13)	Harrison Barnes (5)	American Airlines Center; 19,231	3–3

November: 5–11 (home: 3–6; road: 2–5)

Game	Date	Team	Score	High points	High rebounds	High assists	Location Attendance	Record
7	November 2	@ Utah	L 113–119	Harrison Barnes (23)	Richaun Holmes (10)	De'Aaron Fox (9)	Vivint Arena; 18,306	3–4
8	November 3	New Orleans	W 112–99	Harrison Barnes (23)	Harrison Barnes (8)	Davion Mitchell (8)	Golden 1 Center; 12,480	4–4
9	November 5	Charlotte	W 140–110	Buddy Hield (26)	Richaun Holmes (20)	De'Aaron Fox (9)	Golden 1 Center; 14,905	5–4
10	November 7	Indiana	L 91–94	Harrison Barnes (22)	Richaun Holmes (9)	Davion Mitchell (6)	Golden 1 Center; 12,993	5–5
11	November 8	Phoenix	L 104–109	Harrison Barnes (26)	Richaun Holmes (8)	De'Aaron Fox (5)	Golden 1 Center; 13,566	5–6
12	November 10	@ San Antonio	L 116–137	De'Aaron Fox (37)	Richaun Holmes (12)	Fox, Mitchell (6)	AT&T Center; 15,065	5–7
13	November 12	@ Oklahoma City	L 103–105	Harrison Barnes (21)	Richaun Holmes (15)	Tyrese Haliburton (7)	Paycom Center; 12,881	5–8
14	November 15	@ Detroit	W 129–107	Buddy Hield (22)	Chimezie Metu (10)	Tyrese Haliburton (10)	Little Caesars Arena; 10,092	6–8
15	November 17	@ Minnesota	L 97–107	De'Aaron Fox (28)	Tristan Thompson (9)	De'Aaron Fox (5)	Target Center; 13,108	6–9
16	November 19	Toronto	L 89–108	De'Aaron Fox (17)	Jones, Metu (9)	Davion Mitchell (4)	Golden 1 Center; 13,159	6–10
17	November 20	Utah	L 105–123	Richaun Holmes (22)	Harrison Barnes (8)	Harrison Barnes (5)	Golden 1 Center; 13,180	6–11
18	November 22	Philadelphia	L 94–102	De'Aaron Fox (23)	Richaun Holmes (8)	Tyrese Haliburton (9)	Golden 1 Center; 13,948	6–12
19	November 24	Portland	W 125–121	Buddy Hield (22)	Bagley III, Thompson (8)	Haliburton, Fox (6)	Golden 1 Center; 14,997	7–12
20	November 26	@ L.A. Lakers	W 141–137 (3OT)	De'Aaron Fox (34)	Len, Metu (8)	Tyrese Haliburton (9)	Staples Center; 18,997	8–12
21	November 28	@ Memphis	L 101–128	Buddy Hield (14)	Chimezie Metu (11)	Davion Mitchell (6)	FedEx Forum; 12,844	8–13
22	November 30	L.A. Lakers	L 92–117	Richaun Holmes (27)	Chimezie Metu (11)	Tyrese Haliburton (6)	Golden 1 Center; 12,459	8–14

December: 7–8 (home: 6–4; road: 1–4)

Game	Date	Team	Score	High points	High rebounds	High assists	Location Attendance	Record
23	December 1	@ L.A. Clippers	W 124–115	De'Aaron Fox (24)	Richaun Holmes (11)	Tyrese Haliburton (11)	Staples Center; 17,217	9–14
24	December 4	L.A. Clippers	W 104–99	Terence Davis (28)	Marvin Bagley III (11)	Fox, Haliburton (5)	Golden 1 Center; 15,004	10–14
25	December 8	Orlando	W 142–130	De'Aaron Fox (33)	Tristan Thompson (10)	Tyrese Haliburton (11)	Golden 1 Center; 14,364	11–14
26	December 10	@ Charlotte	L 123–124	De'Aaron Fox (31)	Marvin Bagley III (10)	Tyrese Haliburton (7)	Spectrum Center; 16,335	11–15
27	December 11	@ Cleveland	L 103–117	Buddy Hield (21)	Marvin Bagley III (7)	Davion Mitchell (5)	Rocket Mortgage FieldHouse; 19,432	11–16
28	December 13	@ Toronto	L 101–124	De'Aaron Fox (29)	Marvin Bagley III (11)	Davion Mitchell (6)	Scotiabank Arena; 19,463	11–17
29	December 15	Washington	W 119–105	De'Aaron Fox (28)	Tyrese Haliburton (8)	Tyrese Haliburton (9)	Golden 1 Center; 13,806	12–17
30	December 17	Memphis	L 105–124	Tyrese Haliburton (21)	Chimezie Metu (11)	Tyrese Haliburton (10)	Golden 1 Center; 14,659	12–18
31	December 19	San Antonio	W 121–114	Buddy Hield (29)	Damian Jones (8)	Tyrese Haliburton (11)	Golden 1 Center; 15,091	13–18
32	December 20	@ Golden State	L 98–113	Tyrese Haliburton (24)	Tristan Thompson (9)	Tyrese Haliburton (11)	Chase Center; 18,064	13–19
33	December 22	L.A. Clippers	L 89–105	Tyrese Haliburton (22)	Chimezie Meru (10)	Tyrese Haliburton (13)	Golden 1 Center; 15,386	13–20
34	December 26	Memphis	L 102–127	Tyrese Haliburton (18)	Harrison Barnes (7)	Tyrese Haliburton (7)	Golden 1 Center; 15,685	13–21
35	December 28	Oklahoma City	W 117–111	Tyrese Haliburton (24)	Damian Jones (14)	Tyrese Haliburton (10)	Golden 1 Center; 14,750	14–21
36	December 29	Dallas	W 95–94	De'Aaron Fox (16)	Chimezie Metu (8)	Tyrese Haliburton (10)	Golden 1 Center; 16,071	15–21
37	December 31	Dallas	L 96–112	Tyrese Haliburton (17)	Tyrese Haliburton (10)	Damian Jones (8)	Golden 1 Center; 15,833	15–22

January: 3–12 (home: 3–4; road: 0–8)

Game	Date	Team	Score	High points	High rebounds	High assists	Location Attendance	Record
38	January 2	Miami	W 115–113	Buddy Hield (26)	Damian Jones (10)	Tyrese Haliburton (12)	Golden 1 Center; 13,699	16–22
39	January 4	@ L.A. Lakers	L 114–122	De'Aaron Fox (30)	Marvin Bagley III (12)	Tyrese Haliburton (9)	Staples Center; 17,919	16–23
40	January 5	Atlanta	L 102–108	De'Aaron Fox (30)	Marvin Bagley III (12)	De'Aaron Fox (6)	Golden 1 Center; 13,104	16–24
41	January 7	@ Denver	L 111–121	De'Aaron Fox (30)	Alex Len (10)	Tyrese Haliburton (6)	Ball Arena; 15,966	16–25
42	January 9	@ Portland	L 88–103	Tyrese Haliburton (17)	Alex Len (10)	Tyrese Haliburton (9)	Moda Center; 16,408	16–26
43	January 10	Cleveland	L 108–109	Tyrese Haliburton (21)	Bagley III, Len (10)	Tyrese Haliburton (8)	Golden 1 Center; 12,110	16–27
44	January 12	L.A. Lakers	W 125–116	De'Aaron Fox (29)	Marvin Bagley III (9)	Tyrese Haliburton (10)	Golden 1 Center; 12,199	17–27
45	January 14	Houston	W 126–114	De'Aaron Fox (27)	Marvin Bagley III (13)	Tyrese Haliburton (12)	Golden 1 Center; 12,857	18–27
46	January 16	Houston	L 112–118	Buddy Hield (27)	Chimezie Metu (7)	Davion Mitchell (7)	Golden 1 Center; 13,601	18–28
47	January 19	Detroit	L 131–133	Terence Davis (35)	Marvin Bagley III (9)	De'Aaron Fox (8)	Golden 1 Center; 12,907	18–29
48	January 22	@ Milwaukee	L 127–133	Harrison Barnes (29)	Buddy Hield (8)	Tyrese Haliburton (12)	Fiserv Forum; 17,341	18–30
49	January 25	@ Boston	L 75–128	Buddy Hield (11)	Richaun Holmes (9)	Tyrese Haliburton (7)	TD Garden; 19,156	18–31
50	January 26	@ Atlanta	L 104–121	Harrison Barnes (28)	Harrison Barnes (9)	Tyrese Haliburton (7)	State Farm Arena; 15,080	18–32
51	January 29	@ Philadelphia	L 101–103	Tyrese Haliburton (38)	Bagley III, Holmes (9)	Tyrese Haliburton (7)	Wells Fargo Center; 20,380	18–33
52	January 31	@ New York	L 96–116	Tyrese Haliburton (21)	Richaun Holmes (7)	Tyrese Haliburton (8)	Madison Square Garden; 15,925	18–34

February: 5–6 (home: 3–2; road: 2–4)

Game	Date	Team	Score	High points	High rebounds	High assists	Location Attendance	Record
53	February 2	Brooklyn	W 112–101	Harrison Barnes (19)	Chimezie Metu (12)	Tyrese Haliburton (11)	Golden 1 Center; 13,153	19–34
54	February 3	@ Golden State	L 114–126	Davion Mitchell (26)	Tyrese Haliburton (6)	Davion Mitchell (8)	Chase Center; 18,064	19–35
55	February 5	Oklahoma City	W 113–103	Harrison Barnes (24)	Maurice Harkless (11)	Tyrese Haliburton (17)	Golden 1 Center; 14,097	20–35
56	February 8	Minnesota	L 114–134	De'Aaron Fox (29)	Chimezie Metu (8)	De'Aaron Fox (6)	Golden 1 Center; 12,409	20–36
57	February 9	Minnesota	W 132–119	Harrison Barnes (30)	Domantas Sabonis (14)	Davion Mitchell (7)	Golden 1 Center; 12,527	21–36
58	February 12	@ Washington	W 132–119	De'Aaron Fox (26)	Domantas Sabonis (11)	Domantas Sabonis (7)	Capital One Arena; 14,169	22–36
59	February 14	@ Brooklyn	L 85–109	De'Aaron Fox (26)	Domantas Sabonis (9)	De'Aaron Fox (3)	Barclays Center; 16,873	22–37
60	February 16	@ Chicago	L 118–125	De'Aaron Fox (33)	Domantas Sabonis (12)	De'Aaron Fox (9)	United Center; 19,166	22–38
61	February 24	Denver	L 110–128	Domantas Sabonis (33)	Domantas Sabonis (14)	Domantas Sabonis (5)	Golden 1 Center; 15,855	22–39
62	February 26	@ Denver	L 110–115	De'Aaron Fox (26)	Domantas Sabonis (16)	De'Aaron Fox (10)	Ball Arena; 19,520	22–40
63	February 28	@ Oklahoma City	W 131–110	De'Aaron Fox (29)	Domantas Sabonis (16)	De'Aaron Fox (10)	Paycom Center; 13,945	23–40

March: 5–9 (home: 1–5; road: 4–4)

Game	Date	Team	Score	High points	High rebounds	High assists	Location Attendance	Record
64	March 2	@ New Orleans	L 95–125	De'Aaron Fox (25)	Domantas Sabonis (14)	Domantas Sabonis (7)	Smoothie King Center; 15,490	23–41
65	March 3	@ San Antonio	W 115–112	Harrison Barnes (27)	Domantas Sabonis (12)	De'Aaron Fox (9)	AT&T Center; 13,049	24–41
66	March 5	@ Dallas	L 113–114	De'Aaron Fox (44)	Domantas Sabonis (10)	Fox, Sabonis (6)	American Airlines Center; 20,060	24–42
67	March 7	New York	L 115–131	De'Aaron Fox (24)	Domantas Sabonis (13)	De'Aaron Fox (7)	Golden 1 Center; 14,720	24–43
68	March 9	Denver	L 100–106	De'Aaron Fox (32)	Trey Lyles (9)	De'Aaron Fox (10)	Golden 1 Center; 14,697	24–44
69	March 12	@ Utah	L 125–134	De'Aaron Fox (41)	Richaun Holmes (6)	De'Aaron Fox (11)	Vivint Arena; 18,306	24–45
70	March 14	Chicago	W 112–103	De'Aaron Fox (34)	Trey Lyles (11)	Barnes, Fox (6)	Golden 1 Center; 15,943	25–45
71	March 16	Milwaukee	L 126–135	Domantas Sabonis (22)	Trey Lyles (12)	Fox, Sabonis (7)	Golden 1 Center; 15,864	25–46
72	March 18	Boston	L 97–126	Domantas Sabonis (30)	Domantas Sabonis (20)	Donte DiVincenzo (8)	Golden 1 Center; 15,313	25–47
73	March 20	Phoenix	L 124–127 (OT)	Davion Mitchell (28)	Domantas Sabonis (12)	Davion Mitchell (9)	Golden 1 Center; 17,583	25–48
74	March 23	@ Indiana	W 110–109	Davion Mitchell (25)	DiVincenzo, Jones (6)	Donte DiVincenzo (8)	Gainbridge Fieldhouse; 14,227	26–48
75	March 26	@ Orlando	W 114–110 (OT)	Davion Mitchell (22)	Trey Lyles (18)	Davion Mitchell (9)	Amway Center; 16,366	27–48
76	March 28	@ Miami	L 100–123	Davion Mitchell (21)	Chimezie Metu (9)	Davion Mitchell (9)	FTX Arena; 19,600	27–49
77	March 30	@ Houston	W 121–118	Jones, Lyles, Mitchell (24)	Damian Jones (9)	Davion Mitchell (8)	Toyota Center; 13,365	28–49

April: 2–3 (home: 0–2; road: 2–1)

Game	Date	Team	Score	High points	High rebounds	High assists	Location Attendance	Record
78	April 1	@ Houston	W 122–117	Harrison Barnes (25)	Damian Jones (17)	Davion Mitchell (10)	Toyota Center; 14,857	29–49
79	April 3	Golden State	L 90–109	Harrison Barnes (18)	Harrison Barnes (10)	Davion Mitchell (9)	Golden 1 Center; 17,583	29–50
80	April 5	New Orleans	L 109–123	Damian Jones (22)	Harrison Barnes (6)	Davion Mitchell (17)	Golden 1 Center; 16,047	29–51
81	April 9	@ L.A. Clippers	L 98–117	Davion Mitchell (22)	Chimezie Metu (10)	Davion Mitchell (7)	Staples Center; 17,568	29–52
82	April 10	@ Phoenix	W 116–109	Jones,Holiday, DiVincenzo (19)	Lyles, Metu (7)	Davion Mitchell (15)	Footprint Center; 17,071	30–52

2021–22 season schedule

== Player statistics ==
Legend
GP	Games played	GS	Games started	MPG	Minutes per game
FG%	Field-goal percentage	3P%	3-point field-goal percentage	FT%	Free-throw percentage
RPG	Rebounds per game	APG	Assists per game	SPG	Steals per game
BPG	Blocks per game	PPG	Points per game

=== Regular season ===
Player	GP	GS	MPG	FG%	3P%	FT%	RPG	APG	SPG	BPG	PPG
Harrison Barnes	77	77	33.5	.469	.394	.826	5.6	2.4	.7	.2	16.4
Davion Mitchell	75	19	27.7	.418	.316	.659	2.2	4.2	.7	.3	11.5
Chimezie Metu	60	20	21.3	.452	.306	.780	5.6	1.0	.9	.5	8.9
De'Aaron Fox	59	59	35.3	.473	.297	.750	3.9	5.6	1.2	.4	23.2
Damian Jones	56	15	18.2	.658	.345	.718	4.4	1.2	.5	.8	8.1
Buddy Hield^{†}	55	6	28.6	.382	.368	.870	4.0	1.9	.9	.3	14.4
Tyrese Haliburton^{†}	51	51	34.5	.457	.413	.837	3.9	7.4	1.7	.7	14.3
Maurice Harkless	47	24	18.4	.459	.307	.714	2.4	.5	.6	.5	4.6
Richaun Holmes	45	37	23.9	.660	.400	.778	7.0	1.1	.4	.9	10.4
Alex Len	39	10	15.9	.534	.286	.651	4.1	1.2	.3	.6	6.0
Marvin Bagley III^{†}	30	17	22.1	.463	.242	.745	7.2	.6	.3	.4	9.3
Terence Davis	30	11	17.9	.423	.329	.818	3.1	1.3	.8	.4	10.4
Tristan Thompson^{†}	30	3	15.2	.503	1.000	.533	5.4	.6	.4	.4	6.2
Justin Holiday^{†}	25	25	25.6	.348	.342	.762	2.2	1.5	.8	.6	8.3
Donte DiVincenzo^{†}	25	1	26.6	.362	.368	.839	4.4	3.6	1.5	.2	10.3
Trey Lyles^{†}	24	20	22.8	.489	.365	.851	5.6	1.3	.3	.3	10.6
Jahmi'us Ramsey	19	0	7.1	.414	.278	.500	.7	.4	.1	.1	3.2
Jeremy Lamb^{†}	17	0	18.9	.403	.302	.846	3.5	1.8	.5	.5	7.9
Domantas Sabonis^{†}	15	15	33.6	.554	.235	.743	12.3	5.8	.9	.3	18.9
Neemias Queta	15	0	8.0	.447		.647	2.1	.4	.1	.5	3.0
Josh Jackson^{†}	12	0	10.3	.347	.176	.714	1.5	.4	.4	.3	4.3
Robert Woodard II	12	0	3.5	.125	.250	1.000	.9	.3	.1	.1	.6
Louis King	10	0	10.4	.319	.296	.700	1.2	.9	.2	.1	4.5
Justin Robinson^{†}	3	0	5.0	.125	.000		.3	.7	.0	.0	.7
Emmanuel Mudiay	2	0	5.5	.000		.750	.0	2.0	.5	.0	1.5
Ade Murkey	1	0	1.0				.0	.0	.0	.0	.0

- ^{†} Denotes player spent time with another team in the season. Stats reflect time with the Kings only.

== Transactions ==
=== Trades ===
August 7, 2021	Three-team trade
August 7, 2021	To Sacramento Kings Tristan Thompson (from Boston)	To Atlanta Hawks Delon Wright (from Sacramento)
August 7, 2021	To Boston Celtics Kris Dunn (from Atlanta) Bruno Fernando (from Atlanta) 2023 second-round pick (from Atlanta)

=== Free agency ===
==== Re-signed ====
Player	Signed
Richaun Holmes	August 6, 2021
Terence Davis	August 6, 2021
Maurice Harkless	August 7, 2021

==== Additions ====
Player	Signed	Former team
DJ Steward	July 30, 2021	Duke
Alex Len	August 13, 2021	Washington Wizards
Emanuel Terry	September 8, 2021	Agua Caliente Clippers
Matt Coleman	September 25, 2021	Texas
Damien Jefferson	October 14, 2021	Creighton
Ade Murkey	October 14, 2021	Iowa Wolves
Justin Robinson	December 17, 2021	Milwaukee Bucks
Ade Murkey	December 22, 2021	Stockton Kings
Emmanuel Mudiay	December 22, 2021	(Lithuania) Basketball Club Žalgiris

==== Subtractions ====
Player	Reason left	New team
Hassan Whiteside	Free agency	Utah Jazz
Justin James	Waived	Utah Jazz
Kyle Guy	Free agency	Cleveland Cavaliers
Matt Coleman	Waived	Stockton Kings
DJ Steward	Waived	Stockton Kings
Damien Jefferson	Waived	Stockton Kings
Ade Murkey	Waived	Stockton Kings
Emanuel Terry	Waived	Stockton Kings
Justin Robinson	Contract expired	Detroit Pistons
Ade Murkey (Note: Murkey's and Muddiay's contracts expired on January 2, 2022, after both signed a 10-day contract on December 22, 2021.)	Contract expired	Stockton Kings
Emmanuel Mudiay	Contract expired	
