= Bassala Bagayoko =

Malian basketball player (born 2006)

No. 33 – Texas Tech Red Raiders
- Position: Center
- League: Big 12 Conference

Personal information
- Born: 10 September 2006 (age 20) Bamako, Mali
- Listed height: 208 cm (6 ft 10 in)
- Listed weight: 95 kg (209 lb)

Career information
- College: Texas Tech (2026–present)
- Playing career: 2020–present

Career history
- 2020–2022: Fuenlabrada B
- 2021–2023: Fuenlabrada
- 2024–2026: Bilbao
- 2025: →Zornotza

Career highlights
- 2× FIBA Europe Cup champion (2025, 2026); All-Liga ACB Young Players Team (2026)

Bassala Bagayoko (born 10 September 2006) is a Malian basketball player for the Texas Tech Red Raiders of the Big 12 conference. He has previously played professionally for Bilbao Basket of the Liga ACB.

== Youth career ==
Bagayoko moved from his hometown of Bamako, Mali, to Spain in 2018, living with a host family. He joined the youth ranks of Santa Lucía Basket in the Canary Islands, leading their Infantil (under-14) squad to a Canarian championship title and an appearance at the 2019 Spanish National Championship. He also led the Canary Islands representative team to their first-ever national title, recording 17 points, 15 rebounds and two blocks in the semifinal before contributing 21 points, 24 rebounds and two blocks in the final.

Bagayoko was invited to play with Iberostar Tenerife on loan in the Minicopa Endesa, an under-14 club tournament, and averaged 15.2 points, eight rebounds, and 1.8 assists per game in the competition. He was selected to the ideal team after helping Iberostar Tenerife reach the final, where he recorded 11 points, nine rebounds and three assists in the loss to Real Madrid. Bagayoko moved to Madrid to play with Baloncesto Alcalá during the 2019–20 season, notably scoring 52 points in a game against Real Madrid on 17 November 2019.

Bagayoko won the 2021–22 Adidas Next Generation Tournament (ANGT) while on loan with Serbian club KK Mega Leks, averaging 17.3 points, 12.3 rebounds, 2.7 assists, 2.3 steals, and 1.7 blocks per game. He recorded 19 points, 11 rebounds, and two blocks in the 82–61 championship game victory over the U18 Next Generation Select Team. Bagayoko was named the ANGT Rising Star and a member of the all-tournament team.

== Professional career ==
=== Fuenlabrada (2020–2023) ===
Bagayoko joined Baloncesto Fuenlabrada for the 2020–21 season and split his time between the Junior (under-18) team and the reserve team playing in the Liga EBA, the fourth division of Spanish basketball. He averaged 8.8 points and eight rebounds per game in his first year in the Liga EBA. On 25 April 2021, Bagayoko made his first-team debut for Fuenlabrada in a 90–76 league defeat to Real Madrid, recording two points, two rebounds, and one block in nine minutes. He became the youngest player ever to debut in the Liga ACB, at 14 years and 7 months, breaking the record held by Ricky Rubio. Bagayoko played in four more games to close out the season and averaged 1.2 points and 1.6 rebounds per game in limited minutes.

Bagayoko again received limited playing time in 2021–22, averaging 1.3 points and 1.8 rebounds in less than eight minutes per game in his second season. He also averaged 12.8 points and 11.4 rebounds per game for the reserves in the Liga EBA. Prior to the 2022–23 season, Fuenlabrada head coach Josep Maria Raventós indicated that young players such as Bagayoko, Juan Fernández and Rodijs Macoha would play an increased role on the team. Bagayoko averaged 6.1 points, 4.6 rebounds and 1.3 steals and 17.4 minutes played in seven games. On 30 October 2022, he recorded 11 points and eight rebounds in a 91–69 loss to Real Madrid. However, on November 5, 2022 in a game against Bàsquet Manresa, Bagayoko tore his anterior cruciate ligament (ACL) and meniscus forcing him to miss the remainder of 2022–23 and the entirety of 2023–24 seasons.

On 30 June 2023, Bagayoko informed Fuenlabrada of his decision to rescind his contract, which tied him to the club until 2026. This drew comparisons to Bismack Biyombo, who rescinded his contract with Fuenlabrada in 2011 and signed with the Charlotte Bobcats.

=== Bilbao Basket (2024–2026) ===
On August 16, 2024, while still recovering from his injuries, Bagayoko joined Bilbao Basket. Two years and three months after his injury, he made his long-awaited return on January 29, 2025 in a FIBA Europe Cup game against Cholet Basket, playing 7 minutes and grabbing 2 offensive rebounds. Two days later, Bagayoko was loaned to Zornotza to gain more playing time. After playing 6 games in Segunda FEB, he returned to Bilbao Basket on March 30, in a game against Real Madrid, playing 11 minutes and having 4 points, 2 rebounds and 3 steals.
