= Chimezie Metu =

Nigerian-American basketball player (born 1997)

- Metu with Galatasaray in 2026

No. 10 – Galatasaray
- Position: Power forward / center
- League: BSL; Champions League

Personal information
- Born: March 22, 1997 (age 29) Los Angeles, California, U.S.
- Listed height: 6 ft 10 in (2.08 m)
- Listed weight: 225 lb (102 kg)

Career information
- High school: Lawndale (Lawndale, California)
- College: USC (2015–2018)
- NBA draft: 2018: 2nd round, 49th overall pick
- Drafted by: San Antonio Spurs
- Playing career: 2018–present

Career history
- 2018–2020: San Antonio Spurs
- 2018–2020: →Austin Spurs
- 2020–2023: Sacramento Kings
- 2023–2024: Phoenix Suns
- 2024: Detroit Pistons
- 2024–2025: FC Barcelona
- 2026: Gran Canaria
- 2026–present: Galatasaray

Career highlights
- First-team All-Pac-12 (2018); Second-team All-Pac-12 (2017); Pac-12 Most Improved Player (2017)
- Stats at NBA.com
- Stats at Basketball Reference

Chimezie Chukwudum Metu // (born March 22, 1997) is a Nigerian-American professional basketball player who last played for Galatasaray of the Basketbol Süper Ligi. He played college basketball for the USC Trojans.

== Early life ==
Metu's attended Lawndale High School in Lawndale, California. A four-star recruit, he was the No. 46 recruit according to Rivals.com. Metu committed to the University of Southern California (USC) on May 12, 2014.

== College career ==
As a freshman, Metu played in 34 games, starting 2. He averaged 6.4 points and 3.6 rebounds per game. He also had 54 blocks, which was the 2nd most blocks by a USC freshman since Taj Gibson. He also played 10 minutes in USC's loss to Providence in the first round of the 2016 NCAA Division I men's basketball tournament.

Metu started in all 36 games as a sophomore, averaging 14.8 points and 7.8 rebounds per game. He led the team to the 2nd round of the 2017 NCAA Division I men's basketball tournament. He was named 2017 Pac-12 Most Improved Player, 2nd Team All-Pac-12 and All-Academic Honorable Mention.

Metu played in 34 games as a junior, starting 33. He averaged 15.7 points and 7.4 rebounds per game. On February 23, 2018, he was named in a federal document that linked him to an alleged $2,000 payment from a sports agency, but was cleared by USC. On March 5, 2018, he was named 1st Team All-Pac-12 along with teammate Jordan McLaughlin. Being set to graduate in three years and after sitting out the 2018 National Invitation Tournament to avoid injury, he declared for the 2018 NBA draft.

== Professional career ==
=== San Antonio Spurs (2018–2020) ===
On June 21, 2018, Metu was drafted by the San Antonio Spurs with the 49th pick in the 2018 NBA draft. Metu was later included in the 2018 NBA Summer League roster of the San Antonio Spurs. On September 4, 2018, Metu signed with the San Antonio Spurs. On October 20, 2018, Metu made his NBA debut, coming off from bench for about three minutes with two points, two rebounds and a block in a 108–121 loss to Portland Trail Blazers.

On November 20, 2020, the Spurs waived Metu.

=== Sacramento Kings (2020–2023) ===
On November 28, 2020, Metu signed with the Sacramento Kings, but was waived on December 22 after appearing in four pre-season games. Two days later, he signed a two-way contract with the Kings. On April 28, 2021, the Kings signed him to a multi-year deal after making 28 appearances.

On August 15, 2021, during a 86–70 Las Vegas Summer League victory over the Dallas Mavericks, Metu was ejected after throwing a punch at opposing forward Eugene Omoruyi. The next day, the NBA suspended Metu for the Summer League championship game, which the Kings won.

On December 29, 2021, Metu hit a game-winning three from the right corner at the buzzer to propel Sacramento to a 95–94 home victory over the Dallas Mavericks.

=== Phoenix Suns (2023–2024) ===
On July 4, 2023, Metu signed with the Phoenix Suns on a one-year contract. On Christmas Day, Metu had a career-high double-double of 23 points and 19 rebounds off the bench in a 128–114 loss to the Dallas Mavericks.

On February 8, 2024, Metu was traded to the Memphis Grizzlies in a three-team trade involving the Brooklyn Nets and the next day, he was waived.

=== Detroit Pistons (2024) ===
On March 20, 2024, Metu signed a 10-day contract with the Detroit Pistons and on March 30, he signed with Detroit for the rest of the season. In 14 games (including seven starts) for the Pistons, Metu averaged 10.5 points, 6.0 rebounds, and 1.9 assists.

=== FC Barcelona (2024–2025) ===
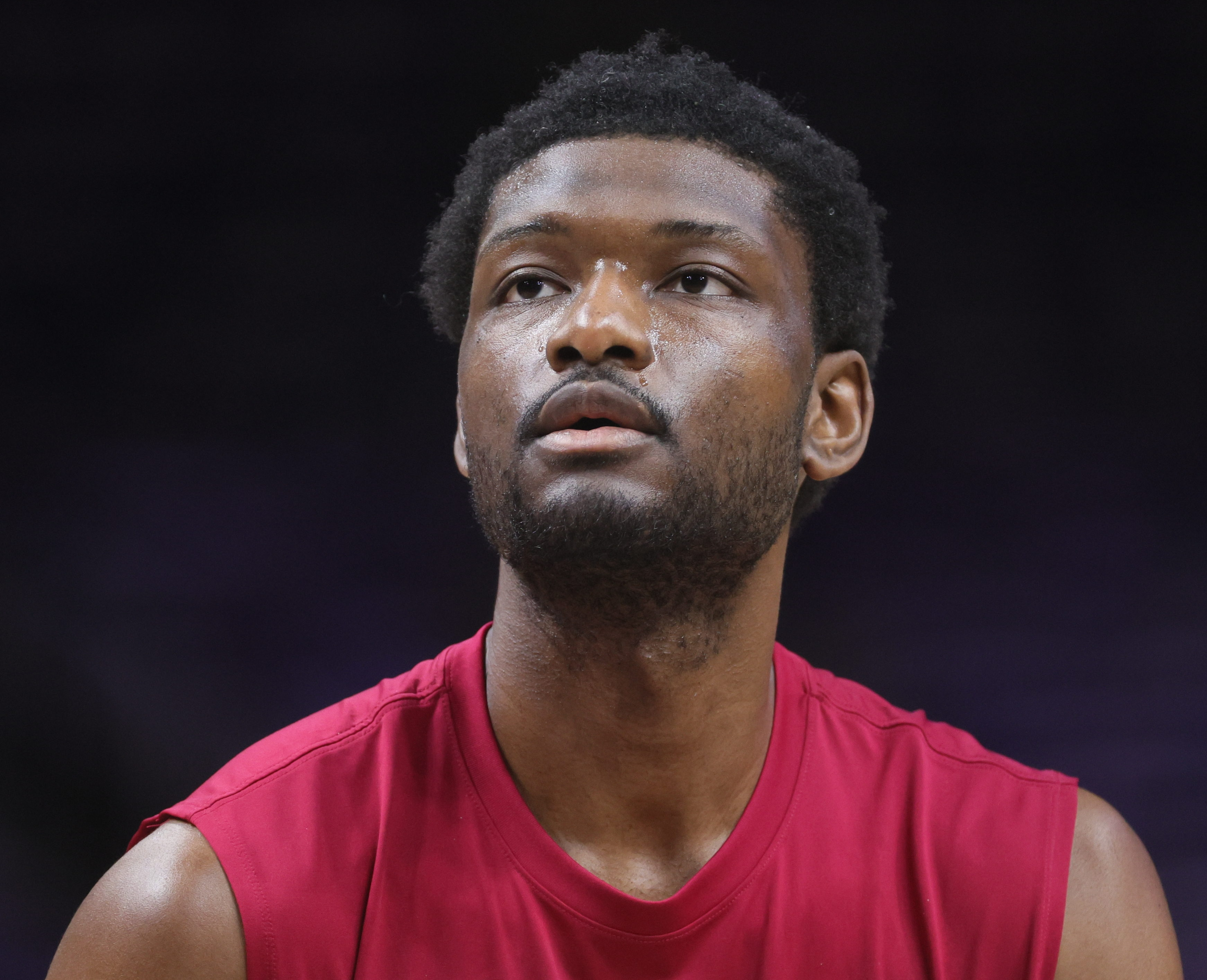
Metu with FC Barcelona in 2025

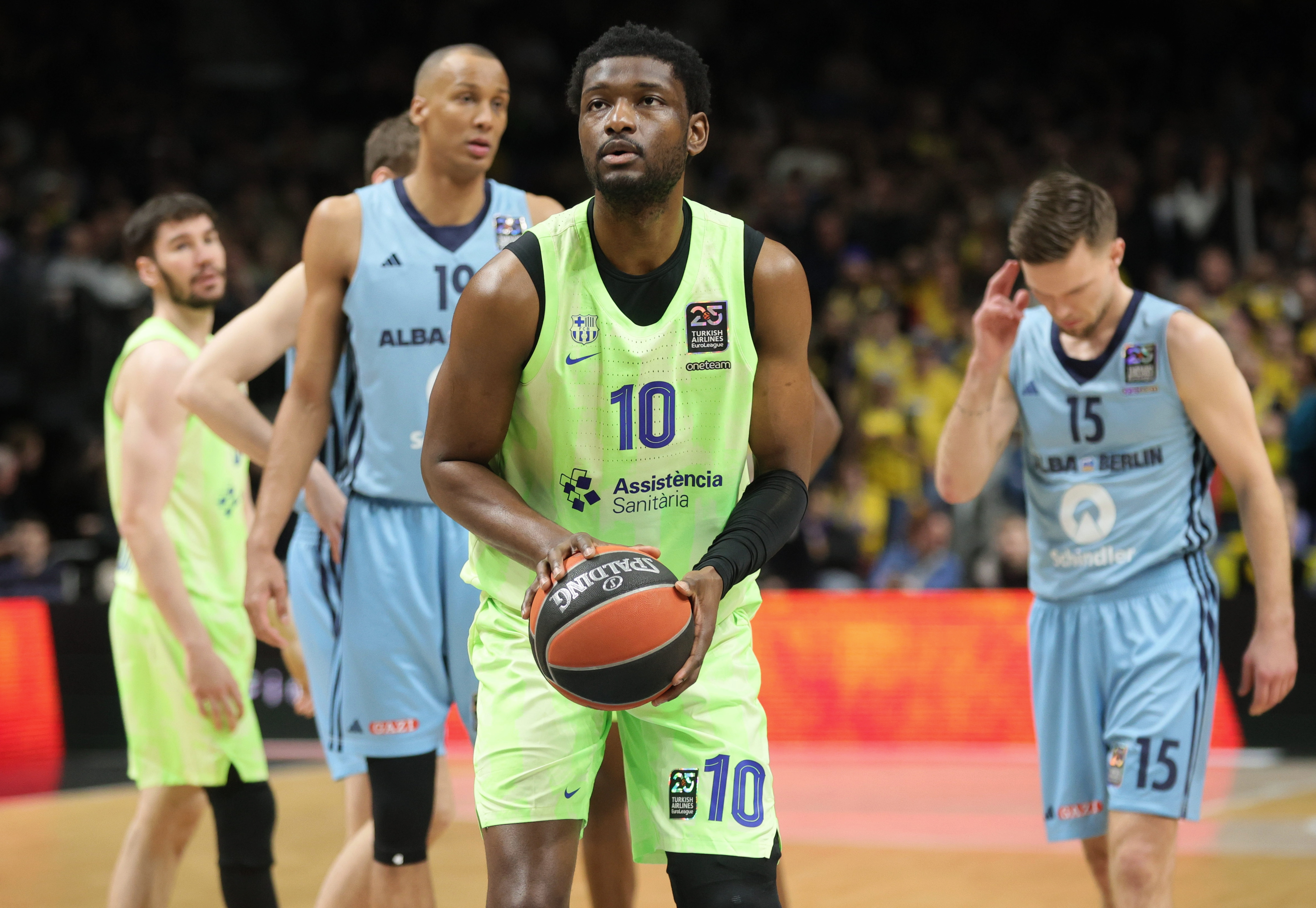
Metu in a EuroLeague game with FC Barcelona in 2025

On July 30, 2024, Metu signed a one year contract with FC Barcelona. Metu had an impressive first season in Europe with the Catalans. After missing more than a month of play due to a knee sprain in November, Metu significantly improved his numbers with key performances against Valencia and Crvena Zvezda. He averaged 11 points per game in EuroLeague and 13.2 in Liga ACB, becoming a key player in FC Barcelona's frontcourt. His performance sparked rumors about a possible contract extension with Barcelona or offers from other European clubs, such as alleged interest from rivals Real Madrid.

However, Metu was unable to finish the season, as he suffered a major injury in one of the final games of the regular season. On March 25, 2025, he had to be helped off the court after rupturing his achilles tendon in a EuroLeague loss against FC Bayern at home. After the rupture of his achilles tendon was confirmed to be total, Metu would undergo surgery in his home country, with an expected recovery time of at least 9 months.

On July 10, 2025, it was reported that Metu was nearing a deal with Fenerbahçe Beko of the Basketbol Süper Ligi, pending a successful medical evaluation. On July 22, it was announced that the signing had fallen through during the final stages of contract negotiations.

=== Gran Canaria (2026) ===
On March 3, 2026, Metu signed for Gran Canaria of the Liga ACB and the Basketball Champions League (BCL). On March 22, Metu made his debut with Gran Canaria in a Liga ACB game against CB Breogán, nearly a year after sustaining the injury that had kept him sidelined. On June 25, Gran Canaria announced Metu was leaving the team.

=== Galatasaray (2026–present) ===
On July 10, 2026, Metu signed with Galatasaray of the Basketbol Süper Ligi (BSL).

== National team career ==
On August 27, 2019, Metu was included in the Nigerian final roster for the 2019 FIBA Basketball World Cup.

== Career statistics ==
Legend
GP	Games played	GS	Games started	MPG	Minutes per game
FG%	Field goal percentage	3P%	3-point field goal percentage	FT%	Free throw percentage
RPG	Rebounds per game	APG	Assists per game	SPG	Steals per game
BPG	Blocks per game	PPG	Points per game	**Bold**	Career high

=== NBA ===
==== Regular season ====
Year	Team	GP	GS	MPG	FG%	3P%	FT%	RPG	APG	SPG	BPG	PPG
2018–19	San Antonio	29	0	5.0	.328	.000	.765	1.2	.4	.2	.1	1.8
2019–20	San Antonio	18	0	5.8	.571	.000	.769	1.8	.6	.2	.3	3.2
2020–21	Sacramento	36	6	13.6	.508	**.351**	.721	3.1	.8	.4	**.5**	6.3
2021–22	Sacramento	60	**20**	21.3	.452	.306	.780	5.6	1.0	.9	**.5**	8.9
2022–23	Sacramento	**66**	0	10.4	**.589**	.237	.740	3.0	.6	.3	.3	4.9
2023–24	Phoenix	37	5	12.1	.508	.294	.884	3.0	.5	.5	.2	5.0
2023–24	Detroit	14	7	**29.4**	.500	.302	**.952**	**6.0**	**1.9**	**1.7**	**.5**	**10.5**
Career		260	38	13.7	.495	.298	.787	3.5	.8	.5	.4	5.9

==== Playoffs ====
Year	Team	GP	GS	MPG	FG%	3P%	FT%	RPG	APG	SPG	BPG	PPG
2023	Sacramento	3	0	2.0	.000	—	.667	.3	.0	.0	.0	.7
Career		3	0	2.0	.000	—	.667	.3	.0	.0	.0	.7

=== EuroLeague ===
Year	Team	GP	GS	MPG	FG%	3P%	FT%	RPG	APG	SPG	BPG	PPG	PIR
2024–25	Barcelona	24	2	20.0	.551	.364	.750	4.8	1.0	.6	.6	11.0	11.8
Career		24	2	20.0	.551	.364	.750	4.8	1.0	.6	.6	11.0	11.8

=== Domestic leagues ===
Year	Team	League	GP	MPG	FG%	3P%	FT%	RPG	APG	SPG	BPG	PPG
2024–25	(Spain) Barcelona	ACB	20	20.0	.617	.431	.660	3.8	1.0	.7	.6	13.2

=== College ===
Year	Team	GP	GS	MPG	FG%	3P%	FT%	RPG	APG	SPG	BPG	PPG
2015–16	USC	34	2	18.5	.518	.000	.513	3.6	.5	.6	1.6	6.4
2016–17	USC	**36**	**36**	**31.3**	**.552**	**.500**	**.741**	**7.8**	1.4	**.8**	1.5	14.8
2017–18	USC	34	33	31.0	.523	.300	.730	7.4	**1.6**	**.8**	**1.7**	**15.7**
Career		104	71	27.0	.533	.302	.692	6.3	1.2	.7	1.6	12.3

== Personal life ==
Born in Los Angeles, he spent the first years of his life in California before moving to Nigeria with his father at the age of six. He then lived in Nigeria the following six years. In Nigeria, he played soccer.
