= Mathieu Grujicic =

German basketball player (born 2007)

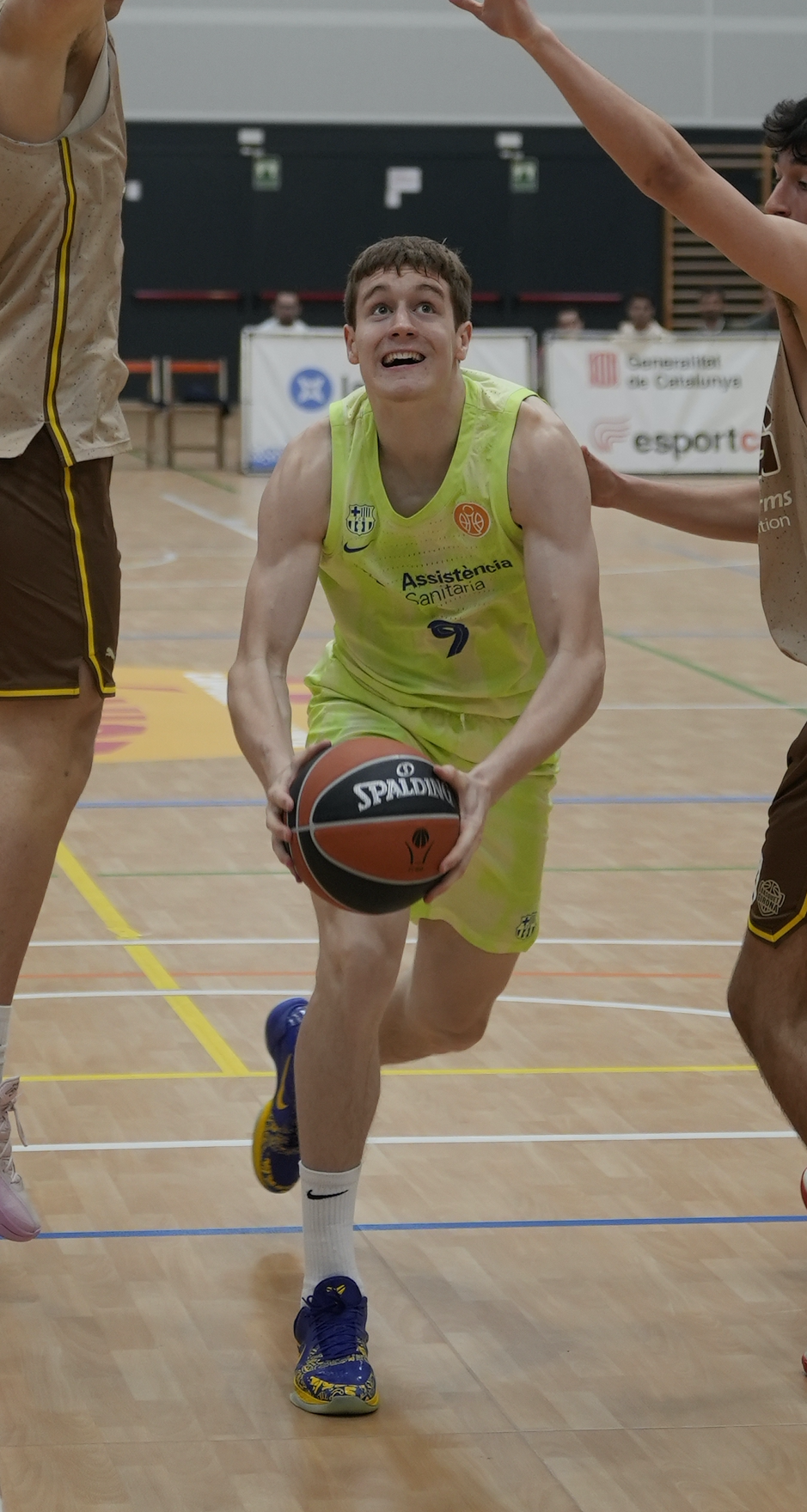
- Grujicic with FC Barcelona B in 2025

No. 9 – Radford Highlanders
- Position: Shooting guard
- League: Big South Conference

Personal information
- Born: 2 June 2007 (age 19) Arles, France
- Listed height: 2.01 m (6 ft 7 in)
- Listed weight: 95 kg (209 lb)

Career information
- College: Ohio State (2025–2026); Radford (2026–present)
- Playing career: 2025–present

Career history
- 2023–2025: FC Barcelona
- 2023–2025: →FC Barcelona B

Mathieu Sacha Grujicic (born 2 June 2007), is a French-German college basketball player for Radford Highlanders of the Big South Conference. He has also played in the German national team's youth teams. Standing at 6 feet 7 inches (2.01 m), Grujicic plays in the shooting guard position.

== Early life and youth career ==
Grujicic was born in Arles, France in 2007. His family moved to Germany in 2012 and Grujicic started playing basketball in the youth ranks of Alba Berlin. Grujicic joined the FC Barcelona academy in the summer of 2023. He played with Barcelona's reserve team, FC Barcelona B, in Tercera FEB, becoming an important player in the team. He also took part in the Euroleague Basketball Next Generation Tournament phase held in Ulm in February 2025, in which he was named MVP.

== College career ==
In June 2025, Grujicic joined the Ohio State Buckeyes in the Big Ten Conference of the NCAA. Regarded as a young prospect in European basketball, Grujicic's performance in the 2025 FIBA U18 EuroBasket impressed before his debut with the Buckeyes. He transferred to Radford in 2026.

== Professional career ==
=== FC Barcelona (2023–25) ===
Grujicic made his professional debut in April 2025, while still a FC Barcelona B player. He played his first minutes for the FC Barcelona first team in a Liga ACB game against Dreamland Gran Canaria in the 2024–25 season. He had already been called up by the senior team in previous games, as other Barcelona youth players, due to the team's injury problems during the season.

Grujicic would go on to make his EuroLeague debut only a few days later, on 23 April 2025. It would be in a 2025 EuroLeague Playoffs game against AS Monaco at the Salle Gaston Médecin. He also saw game time in the second game of the series. His time at Barcelona ended in the summer of 2025, as he left to pursue college basketball in the United States. As Grujicic left Barcelona, he was regarded by several media sources as one of the many basketball prospects that chose to leave Europe for the NCAA.

== National team career ==
Grujicic has played in several international tournaments with the youth ranks of the German national team, playing for the U16 team in the 2023 U16 European Championship. He also took part in the 2025 FIBA U18 EuroBasket with the German U18 team. Grujicic was one of the team's statistical leaders, averaging 24.6 points over seven games and helping the Germans reach the quarterfinals.
