= 2017 FIBA Under-19 Basketball World Cup =

International men's youth basketball championship

Tournament details
- Host country: Egypt
- City: Cairo
- Dates: 1–9 July
- Teams: 16 (from 5 confederations)
- Venue: 1 (in 1 host city)

Final positions
- Champions: Canada (1st title)

Tournament statistics
- MVP: (Canada) R. J. Barrett
- Top scorer: (Canada) Barrett (21.6)
- Top rebounds: (Angola) Sousa (13.1)
- Top assists: (Argentina) Corvalan (6.1)
- PPG (Team): United States (99.4)
- RPG (Team): United States (57.7)
- APG (Team): Lithuania (25.6)

Official website
- www.fiba.basketball

The 2017 FIBA Under-19 Basketball World Cup (Arabic: 2017 كأس العالم لكرة السلة تحت 19 سنة فيبا) was the 13th edition of the FIBA Under-19 Basketball World Cup, the biennial international men's youth basketball championship contested by the U19 national teams of the member associations of FIBA. It was held in Cairo, Egypt from 1 to 9 July 2017.

Canada won the gold medal by defeating Italy in the final match 79–60. This marked Canada's best ever international FIBA tournament finish in any event.

== Venue ==
Cairo	2017 FIBA Under-19 Basketball World Cup is located in Egypt
Cairo Stadium Indoor Halls Complex	2017 FIBA Under-19 Basketball World Cup is located in Egypt
Capacity: 20,000	2017 FIBA Under-19 Basketball World Cup is located in Egypt

== Qualified teams ==
Means of Qualification	Dates	Venue	Berths	Qualifiers
Host Nation	12 March 2016	Switzerland	1	Egypt
2016 FIBA Americas Under-18 Championship	19 – 23 July 2016	Chile	4	United States; Canada; Puerto Rico; Argentina*
2016 FIBA Africa Under-18 Championship	22 – 31 July 2016	Rwanda	2	Angola; Mali
2016 FIBA Asia Under-18 Championship	22 – 31 July 2016	Iran	3	Iran; Japan; South Korea
2016 FIBA Oceania Under-18 Championship	5 – 10 December 2016	Fiji	1	New Zealand
2016 FIBA Europe Under-18 Championship	16 – 22 December 2016	Turkey	5	France; Lithuania; Italy; Germany; Spain
Total			16	

* Brazil qualified for the tournament but was suspended by FIBA. A fourth team from FIBA Americas had to be named to take Brazil's place. The draw took place on 12 May 2017, where Argentina was chosen to replace Brazil.

== Preliminary round ==
The draw for the tournament was held on 11 February 2017 in Cairo, Egypt.

=== Group A ===
Pos	Team	Pld	W	L	PF	PA	PD	Pts
1	France	3	3	0	229	177	+52	6
2	Argentina	3	2	1	227	208	+19	5
3	New Zealand	3	1	2	227	235	−8	4
4	South Korea	3	0	3	212	275	−63	3

Source: FIBA
Rules for classification: 1) Points; 2) Head-to-head results; 3) Points difference; 4) Points scored.

1 July 2017
13:00

Boxscore

New Zealand	88–81	South Korea
Scoring by quarter: 21–15, 18–25, 18–25, 31–16
Pts: Wynyard 22; Rebs: Clinton, Wynyard 6 Asts: Letoa, Waardenburg 5		Pts: Han 20; Rebs: Ha 7 Asts: Park J. 7

Cairo Stadium Indoor Halls Complex, Cairo
Referees: Julio Anaya (PAN), Gonzalo Salgueiro (URU), Tanel Suslov (EST)

1 July 2017
15:15

Boxscore

Argentina	53–62	France
Scoring by quarter: 8–21, 15–18, 13–13, 17–10
Pts: Vaulet 18; Rebs: Lema 14; Asts: Vaulet 4		Pts: Tchouaffé 21; Rebs: Tillie 8 Asts: Goudou 5

Cairo Stadium Indoor Halls Complex, Cairo
Referees: Manuel Mazzoni (ITA), Omar Bermúdez (MEX), Michael Scott (CAN)

2 July 2017
13:15

Boxscore

South Korea	76–100	Argentina
Scoring by quarter: 20–29, 14–22, 19–21, 23–28
Pts: Kim J. 18; Rebs: Park J. 6 Asts: Park J. 8		Pts: Lema 32; Rebs: Lema 10; Asts: Corvalan 10

Cairo Stadium Indoor Halls Complex, Cairo
Referees: Fernando Calatrava (ESP), Matthew Townsend (AUS), Yener Yılmaz (TUR)

2 July 2017
15:30

Boxscore

France	80–69	New Zealand
Scoring by quarter: 21–17, 15–20, 21–16, 23–16
Pts: Goudou 18; Rebs: three players 5 Asts: Goudou 6		Pts: Waardenburg 14; Rebs: Waardenburg 9 Asts: Cameron 4

Cairo Stadium Indoor Halls Complex, Cairo
Referees: Aleksandar Glišić (SRB), Ivor Matějek (CZE), Matthew Myers (USA)

4 July 2017
18:15

Boxscore

Argentina	74–70	New Zealand
Scoring by quarter: 18–16, 29–16, 13–20, 14–18
Pts: Solanas 16; Rebs: four players 6 Asts: Lopez 8		Pts: Clinton 19; Rebs: Clinton 12; Asts: Clinton 3

Cairo Stadium Indoor Halls Complex, Cairo
Referees: Mehdi Difallah (FRA), Daniel García (VEN), Gonzalo Salgueiro (URU)

4 July 2017
18:15

Boxscore

South Korea	55–87	France
Scoring by quarter: 11–17, 18–22, 13–25, 13–23
Pts: Ha 14; Rebs: Ha, Park J. 5 Asts: Park J. 7		Pts: Mokoka, Vautier 14; Rebs: Vautier 10; Asts: Goudou 5

Cairo Stadium Indoor Halls Complex, Cairo
Referees: Andres Bartel (URU), Zdravko Rutešić (MNE), Sofiane Si Youcef (ALG)

=== Group B ===
Pos	Team	Pld	W	L	PF	PA	PD	Pts
1	Lithuania	3	3	0	282	186	+96	6
2	Germany	3	2	1	214	187	+27	5
3	Egypt	3	1	2	157	219	−62	4
4	Puerto Rico	3	0	3	171	232	−61	3

Source: FIBA
Rules for classification: 1) Points; 2) Head-to-head results; 3) Points difference; 4) Points scored.

1 July 2017
17:45

Boxscore

Germany	79–98	Lithuania
Scoring by quarter: 12–25, 22–23, 24–21, 21–29
Pts: Zylka 17; Rebs: Freudenberg 5 Asts: Olinde 4		Pts: Kulboka 25; Rebs: Sedekerskis 9 Asts: Jokubaitis 8

Cairo Stadium Indoor Halls Complex, Cairo
Referees: Andres Bartel (URU), Fernando Calatrava (ESP), Zdravko Rutešić (MNE)

1 July 2017
20:30

Boxscore

Egypt	67–65	Puerto Rico
Scoring by quarter: 26–13, 18–14, 14–17, 9–21
Pts: M. Youssef 16; Rebs: Khalaf 13; Asts: M. Youssef 7		Pts: Cruz 19; Rebs: Texeira 11; Asts: Pacheco 4

Cairo Stadium Indoor Halls Complex, Cairo
Attendance: 12,000
Referees: Mehdi Difallah (FRA), Ivor Matějek (CZE), Arturas Šukys (LTU)

2 July 2017
17:45

Boxscore

Puerto Rico	49–69	Germany
Scoring by quarter: 9–18, 15–16, 17–15, 8–20
Pts: Allende 16; Rebs: Cuascut 6 Asts: Pacheco 6		Pts: Da Silva 14; Rebs: Olinde 11; Asts: Weidemann 8

Cairo Stadium Indoor Halls Complex, Cairo
Referees: Julio Anaya (PAN), Sebastian Negron (CHI), Tanel Suslov (EST)

2 July 2017
20:30

Boxscore

Lithuania	88–50	Egypt
Scoring by quarter: 22–13, 33–8, 19–12, 14–17
Pts: Kulboka 19; Rebs: Kupšas 8 Asts: Giedraitis 7		Pts: Elsheikh 14; Rebs: Khalaf 11; Asts: Elraei 3

Cairo Stadium Indoor Halls Complex, Cairo
Referees: Omar Bermúdez (MEX), Takaki Kato (JPN), Leandro Lezcano (ARG)

4 July 2017
20:30

Boxscore

Germany	66–40	Egypt
Scoring by quarter: 22–12, 17–11, 7–13, 20–4
Pts: Herkenhoff 11; Rebs: Lagerpusch 7 Asts: Bonga 4		Pts: Mostafa 11; Rebs: Mostafa 14; Asts: Farag, O. Youssef 2

Cairo Stadium Indoor Halls Complex, Cairo
Referees: Fernando Calatrava (ESP), Ivor Matějek (CZE), Yener Yılmaz (TUR)

4 July 2017
20:30

Boxscore

Puerto Rico	57–96	Lithuania
Scoring by quarter: 20–26, 15–27, 9–22, 13–21
Pts: López 14; Rebs: Natal 7 Asts: six players 2		Pts: Sedekerskis, Vasiliauskas 15; Rebs: Gadiliauskas 12; Asts: three players 5

Cairo Stadium Indoor Halls Complex, Cairo
Referees: Leandro Lezcano (ARG), Michael Scott (CAN), Nan Ye (CHN)

=== Group C ===
Pos	Team	Pld	W	L	PF	PA	PD	Pts
1	Spain	3	3	0	218	183	+35	6
2	Canada	3	2	1	264	195	+69	5
3	Japan	3	1	2	218	251	−33	4
4	Mali	3	0	3	158	229	−71	3

Source: FIBA
Rules for classification: 1) Points; 2) Head-to-head results; 3) Points difference; 4) Points scored.

1 July 2017
13:15

Boxscore

Japan	67–78	Spain
Scoring by quarter: 16–15, 17–20, 17–21, 17–22
Pts: Hachimura 20; Rebs: Hachimura 10; Asts: Shigetomi 6		Pts: Vila 18; Rebs: Vila 14; Asts: Font 5

Cairo Stadium Indoor Halls Complex, Cairo
Referees: Leandro Lezcano (ARG), Wojciech Liszka (POL), Sebastian Negron (CHI)

1 July 2017
15:30

Boxscore

Canada	91–42	Mali
Scoring by quarter: 24–12, 25–13, 21–8, 21–9
Pts: Barrett 20; Rebs: Barrett 11; Asts: Wigginton 7		Pts: Dembélé 13; Rebs: Dembélé 14; Asts: Haidara 4

Cairo Stadium Indoor Halls Complex, Cairo
Referees: Aleksandar Glišić (SRB), Amr Aboollo (EGY), Taha Al-Hashedi (YEM)

2 July 2017
13:45

Boxscore

Mali	73–76	Japan
Scoring by quarter: 16–12, 16–19, 21–25, 20–20
Pts: O. Traoré 15; Rebs: Sissoko 10; Asts: Haidara 5		Pts: Masuda 16; Rebs: Hachimura 12; Asts: Mikami 6

Cairo Stadium Indoor Halls Complex, Cairo
Referees: Manuel Mazzoni (ITA), Taha Al-Hashedi (YEM), Nan Ye (CHN)

2 July 2017
16:00

Boxscore

Spain	78–73	Canada
Scoring by quarter: 22–18, 17–15, 18–20, 21–20
Pts: Font 19; Rebs: Vila 9 Asts: Figueras 7		Pts: Kigab 16; Rebs: Kigab 8 Asts: Barrett 6

Cairo Stadium Indoor Halls Complex, Cairo
Referees: Mehdi Difallah (FRA), Matthew Beattie (AUS), Arturas Šukys (LTU)

4 July 2017
13:45

Boxscore

Canada	100–75	Japan
Scoring by quarter: 20–21, 27–11, 30–19, 23–24
Pts: Wigginton 21; Rebs: Kigab 12; Asts: Barrett 6		Pts: Hachimura 21; Rebs: Hachimura 11; Asts: Nishida 5

Cairo Stadium Indoor Halls Complex, Cairo
Referees: Julio Anaya (PAN), Wojciech Liszka (POL), Matthew Townsend (AUS)

4 July 2017
13:45

Boxscore

Spain	62–43	Mali
Scoring by quarter: 17–7, 13–15, 11–14, 21–7
Pts: Vanclocha 11; Rebs: Vanclocha 9 Asts: Figueras 4		Pts: Dembélé 13; Rebs: Haidara 12; Asts: Haidara 4

Cairo Stadium Indoor Halls Complex, Cairo
Referees: Aleksandar Glišić (SRB), Amr Aboollo (EGY), Matthew Myers (USA)

=== Group D ===
Pos	Team	Pld	W	L	PF	PA	PD	Pts
1	United States	3	3	0	315	181	+134	6
2	Italy	3	2	1	199	209	−10	5
3	Angola	3	1	2	204	227	−23	4
4	Iran	3	0	3	141	242	−101	3

Source: FIBA
Rules for classification: 1) Points; 2) Head-to-head results; 3) Points difference; 4) Points scored.

1 July 2017
17:30

Boxscore

Iran	48–108	United States
Scoring by quarter: 6–18, 18–28, 13–30, 11–32
Pts: Samadi 11; Rebs: Khandanpour 7 Asts: Bahramzad 3		Pts: Diallo 17; Rebs: McCoy 10; Asts: Huerter, King 5

Cairo Stadium Indoor Halls Complex, Cairo
Referees: Yener Yılmaz (TUR), Matthew Townsend (AUS), Nan Ye (CHN)

1 July 2017
20:30

Boxscore

Angola	66–70 (OT)	Italy
Scoring by quarter: 17–25, 12–11, 19–12, 16–16, Overtime: 2–6
Pts: Sousa 18; Rebs: Sousa 18; Asts: Amândio, Santos 3		Pts: Okeke 14; Rebs: Oxilia 8 Asts: Denegri 6

Cairo Stadium Indoor Halls Complex, Cairo
Referees: Matthew Beattie (AUS), Takaki Kato (JPN), Matthew Myers (USA)

2 July 2017
18:15

Boxscore

United States	109–68	Angola
Scoring by quarter: 24–12, 36–14, 23–18, 26–24
Pts: Okogie 17; Rebs: Wiley 16; Asts: Okogie, Washington 4		Pts: R. Miguel, Sousa 19; Rebs: Valente 8 Asts: Amândio 6

Cairo Stadium Indoor Halls Complex, Cairo
Referees: Michael Scott (CAN), Wojciech Liszka (POL), Zdravko Rutešić (MNE)

2 July 2017
20:00

Boxscore

Italy	64–45	Iran
Scoring by quarter: 19–11, 11–11, 21–13, 13–10
Pts: Oxilia 16; Rebs: Oxilia 13; Asts: Penna 6		Pts: Azari 13; Rebs: Khandanpour 9 Asts: Bahramzad 4

Cairo Stadium Indoor Halls Complex, Cairo
Referees: Andres Bartel (URU), Daniel García (VEN), Gonzalo Salgueiro (URU)

4 July 2017
16:00

Boxscore

Iran	48–70	Angola
Scoring by quarter: 17–17, 11–11, 13–17, 7–25
Pts: Azari 15; Rebs: Gholami 10; Asts: Bahramzad 3		Pts: Amândio 16; Rebs: Sousa 15; Asts: Amândio 5

Cairo Stadium Indoor Halls Complex, Cairo
Referees: Manuel Mazzoni (ITA), Takaki Kato (JPN), Arturas Šukys (LTU)

4 July 2017
16:00

Boxscore

Italy	65–98	United States
Scoring by quarter: 21–27, 18–26, 6–20, 20–25
Pts: Denegri 14; Rebs: Denegri 6 Asts: Bucarelli, Penna 4		Pts: Washington 20; Rebs: Wiley 14; Asts: Quickley 6

Cairo Stadium Indoor Halls Complex, Cairo
Referees: Omar Bermúdez (MEX), Matthew Beattie (AUS), Sebastian Negron (CHI)

== Knockout stage ==
=== Bracket ===
Round of 16
5 July
France	84
Puerto Rico	66
5 July
Canada	87
Angola	65
5 July
New Zealand	65
Germany	72
5 July
Mali	69
United States	117
5 July
Argentina	72
Egypt	67
5 July
Spain	70
Iran	50
5 July
South Korea	63
Lithuania	110
5 July
Japan	55
Italy	57

Quarter-finals
7 July
France	67
Canada	73
7 July
Germany	59
United States	81
7 July
Argentina	58
Spain	70
7 July
Lithuania	68
Italy	73

Semi-finals
8 July
Canada	99
United States	87
8 July
Spain	63
Italy	66

Final
9 July
Canada	79
Italy	60
Third place
9 July
United States	96
Spain	72

5–8th place bracket

5–8th place semifinals
8 July
France	60
Germany	86
8 July
Argentina	77
Lithuania	85

Fifth place
9 July
Germany	80
Lithuania	74
Seventh place
9 July
France	69
Argentina	63

9–16th place bracket

9–16th place quarterfinals
7 July
Puerto Rico	63
Angola	59
7 July
New Zealand	87
Mali	63
7 July
Egypt	57
Iran	53
7 July
South Korea	64
Japan	77

9–12th place semifinals
8 July
Puerto Rico	74
New Zealand	70
8 July
Egypt	73
Japan	76

Ninth place
9 July
Puerto Rico	68
Japan	67
Eleventh place
9 July
New Zealand	85
Egypt	69

13–16th place bracket

13–16th place semifinals
8 July
Angola	73
Mali	54
8 July
Iran	77
South Korea	81

13th place
9 July
Angola	58
South Korea	56
15th place
9 July
Mali	61
Iran	70

=== Round of 16 ===
5 July 2017
13:15

Boxscore

Canada	87–65	Angola
Scoring by quarter: 30–23, 12–19, 22–8, 23–15
Pts: Djuricic 22; Rebs: Kigab 16; Asts: Wigginton 6		Pts: Sousa 18; Rebs: Sousa 9 Asts: Sousa 4

Cairo Stadium Indoor Halls Complex, Cairo
Referees: Leandro Lezcano (ARG), Andres Bartel (URU), Matthew Myers (USA)

5 July 2017
13:45

Boxscore

Japan	55–57	Italy
Scoring by quarter: 13–15, 16–6, 9–19, 17–17
Pts: Hachimura 22; Rebs: Hachimura 14; Asts: Shigetomi 3		Pts: Oxilia 19; Rebs: Okeke 8 Asts: Bucarelli, Penna 4

Cairo Stadium Indoor Halls Complex, Cairo
Referees: Daniel García (VEN), Taha Al-Hashedi (YEM), Gonzalo Salgueiro (URU)

5 July 2017
15:30

Boxscore

Mali	69–117	United States
Scoring by quarter: 10–30, 21–20, 20–26, 18–41
Pts: Haidara 12; Rebs: Keita 5 Asts: three players 4		Pts: Washington 20; Rebs: McCoy 13; Asts: Reddish 6

Cairo Stadium Indoor Halls Complex, Cairo
Referees: Matthew Townsend (AUS), Fernando Calatrava (ESP), Nan Ye (CHN)

5 July 2017
16:00

Boxscore

Spain	70–50	Iran
Scoring by quarter: 17–10, 15–13, 16–22, 22–5
Pts: Font 15; Rebs: Vila 15; Asts: Figueras 11		Pts: Azari 15; Rebs: Azari 9 Asts: Pourkaveh 4

Cairo Stadium Indoor Halls Complex, Cairo
Referees: Michael Scott (CAN), Ivor Matějek (CZE), Sebastian Negron (CHI)

5 July 2017
17:45

Boxscore

South Korea	63–110	Lithuania
Scoring by quarter: 11–34, 19–25, 13–27, 20–24
Pts: Ha 18; Rebs: Ha 5 Asts: Yang Ju. 6		Pts: Kulboka 19; Rebs: Kupšas 7 Asts: Giedraitis 7

Cairo Stadium Indoor Halls Complex, Cairo
Referees: Mehdi Difallah (FRA), Matthew Beattie (AUS), Wojciech Liszka (POL)

5 July 2017
18:15

Boxscore

France	84–66	Puerto Rico
Scoring by quarter: 19–15, 20–16, 20–17, 25–18
Pts: Tillie 20; Rebs: Tillie 7 Asts: Goudou 11		Pts: Cruz 21; Rebs: Cruz, Pacheco 5 Asts: Pacheco 5

Cairo Stadium Indoor Halls Complex, Cairo
Referees: Yener Yılmaz (TUR), Takaki Kato (JPN), Zdravko Rutešić (MNE)

5 July 2017
20:00

Boxscore

New Zealand	65–72	Germany
Scoring by quarter: 11–24, 19–14, 13–16, 22–18
Pts: Samuel, Wynyard 14; Rebs: Waardenburg 12; Asts: Clinton 5		Pts: Sanders 15; Rebs: Olinde 7 Asts: Da Silva, Hundt 5

Cairo Stadium Indoor Halls Complex, Cairo
Referees: Julio Anaya (PAN), Arturas Šukys (LTU), Tanel Suslov (EST)

5 July 2017
20:30

Boxscore

Argentina	72–67	Egypt
Scoring by quarter: 13–24, 22–14, 20–16, 17–13
Pts: Corvalan 19; Rebs: Corvalan 6 Asts: Corvalan 8		Pts: Youssef 17; Rebs: Khalaf 14; Asts: Youssef 8

Cairo Stadium Indoor Halls Complex, Cairo
Referees: Aleksandar Glišić (SRB), Omar Bermúdez (MEX), Manuel Mazzoni (ITA)

=== 9–16th place quarterfinals ===
7 July 2017
14:00

Boxscore

Puerto Rico	63–59	Angola
Scoring by quarter: 14–12, 21–19, 14–11, 14–17
Pts: Texeira 16; Rebs: Rivera 6 Asts: Allende, Rivera 4		Pts: R. Miguel, S. Miguel 13; Rebs: Sousa 15; Asts: Santos 7

Cairo Stadium Indoor Halls Complex, Cairo
Referees: Fernando Calatrava (ESP), Gonzalo Salgueiro (URU), Arturas Sukys (LTU)

7 July 2017
16:15

Boxscore

New Zealand	87–63	Mali
Scoring by quarter: 25–19, 22–12, 19–16, 21–16
Pts: Samuel 24; Rebs: Wynyard 13; Asts: Letoa 9		Pts: O. Traoré 19; Rebs: Keita 10; Asts: Dembélé, O. Traoré 2

Cairo Stadium Indoor Halls Complex, Cairo
Referees: Sebastian Negron (CHI), Amr Aboollo (EGY), Michael Scott (CAN)

7 July 2017
18:30

Boxscore

Egypt	57–53	Iran
Scoring by quarter: 14–15, 18–7, 13–22, 12–9
Pts: Mostafa 14; Rebs: Khalaf 15; Asts: three players 3		Pts: Samadi 16; Rebs: Khandanpour 12; Asts: Samadi 3

Cairo Stadium Indoor Halls Complex, Cairo
Referees: Leandro Lezcano (ARG), Matthew Beattie (AUS), Matthew Townsend (AUS)

7 July 2017
20:45

Boxscore

South Korea	64–77	Japan
Scoring by quarter: 11–25, 21–10, 26–12, 6–30
Pts: Ha 19; Rebs: Ha 11; Asts: Park J. 6		Pts: Hachimura, Nishida 21; Rebs: Schafer 10; Asts: Masuda 5

Cairo Stadium Indoor Halls Complex, Cairo
Referees: Andres Bartel (URU), Ivor Matějek (CZE), Zdravko Rutešić (MNE)

=== Quarterfinals ===
7 July 2017
13:45

Boxscore

Lithuania	68–73	Italy
Scoring by quarter: 15–12, 10–19, 15–21, 28–21
Pts: Sedekerskis 20; Rebs: Masiulis 13; Asts: Masiulis, Sedekerskis 5		Pts: Denegri 18; Rebs: Bucarelli 14; Asts: Bucarelli 5

Cairo Stadium Indoor Halls Complex, Cairo
Referees: Daniel García (VEN), Matthew Myers (USA), Yener Yılmaz (TUR)

7 July 2017
16:15

Boxscore

Argentina	58–70	Spain
Scoring by quarter: 13–18, 17–15, 10–15, 18–22
Pts: López 21; Rebs: Lema 11; Asts: five players 2		Pts: Vila 24; Rebs: Vila 11; Asts: Molins 4

Cairo Stadium Indoor Halls Complex, Cairo
Referees: Mehdi Difallah (FRA), Julio Anaya (PAN), Tanel Suslov (EST)

7 July 2017
18:45

Boxscore

France	67–73	Canada
Scoring by quarter: 15–15, 10–20, 19–18, 23–20
Pts: Tillie 22; Rebs: Tillie 17; Asts: N'Doye 6		Pts: Barrett 27; Rebs: Kigab 15; Asts: Kigab 6

Cairo Stadium Indoor Halls Complex, Cairo
Referees: Manuel Mazzoni (ITA), Omar Bermúdez (MEX), Nan Ye (CHN)

7 July 2017
21:15

Boxscore

Germany	59–81	United States
Scoring by quarter: 13–19, 18–14, 10–23, 18–25
Pts: Zylka 20; Rebs: three players 5 Asts: Bonga 4		Pts: Wiley 19; Rebs: Wiley 10; Asts: Reddish 5

Cairo Stadium Indoor Halls Complex, Cairo
Referees: Aleksandar Glišić (SRB), Takaki Kato (JPN), Wojciech Liszka (POL)

=== 13–16th place semifinals ===
8 July 2017
11:30

Boxscore

Angola	73–54	Mali
Scoring by quarter: 18–10, 16–19, 24–7, 15–18
Pts: Sousa 18; Rebs: Amândio 10; Asts: Amândio 6		Pts: Haidara 17; Rebs: Keita 8 Asts: Haidara, O. Traoré 4

Cairo Stadium Indoor Halls Complex, Cairo
Referees: Matthew Townsend (AUS), Amr Aboollo (EGY), Gonzalo Salgueiro (URU)

8 July 2017
13:45

Boxscore

Iran	77–81	South Korea
Scoring by quarter: 15–16, 24–20, 13–21, 25–24
Pts: Azari 20; Rebs: Khandanpour 13; Asts: Azari 9		Pts: Kim J. 31; Rebs: Ha, Shin 8 Asts: Park J. 8

Cairo Stadium Indoor Halls Complex, Cairo
Referees: Julio Anaya (PAN), Taha Al-Hashedi (YEM), Wojciech Liszka (POL)

=== 9–12th place semifinals ===
8 July 2017
16:00

Boxscore

Puerto Rico	74–70	New Zealand
Scoring by quarter: 13–20, 18–11, 20–14, 23–25
Pts: Cruz 19; Rebs: Cruz 10; Asts: Davis 5		Pts: Clinton, Wynyard 15; Rebs: Wynyard 13; Asts: Cameron 4

Cairo Stadium Indoor Halls Complex, Cairo
Referees: Andres Bartel (URU), Ivor Matějek (CZE), Tanel Suslov (EST)

8 July 2017
18:15

Boxscore

Egypt	73–76 (OT)	Japan
Scoring by quarter: 17–12, 16–16, 11–19, 20–17, Overtime: 9–12
Pts: Khalaf, Youssef 18; Rebs: Khalaf, Ramadan 11; Asts: Youssef 10		Pts: Hachimura 18; Rebs: Hachimura 10; Asts: Shigetomi 5

Cairo Stadium Indoor Halls Complex, Cairo
Referees: Mehdi Difallah (FRA), Matthew Myers (USA), Arturas Šukys (LTU)

=== 5–8th place semifinals ===
8 July 2017
13:00

Boxscore

Argentina	77–85	Lithuania
Scoring by quarter: 21–25, 12–28, 19–11, 25–21
Pts: Corvalan 20; Rebs: Bruera 7 Asts: Corvalan 9		Pts: Masiulis, Stankevičius 16; Rebs: Masiulis 12; Asts: Sedekerskis 7

Cairo Stadium Indoor Halls Complex, Cairo
Referees: Manuel Mazzoni (ITA), Sebastian Negron (CHI), Nan Ye (CHN)

8 July 2017
15:30

Boxscore

France	60–86	Germany
Scoring by quarter: 16–24, 18–20, 19–26, 9–20
Pts: N'Doye 11; Rebs: N'Doye 5 Asts: N'Doye 4		Pts: Lagerpusch 18; Rebs: Lagerpusch 11; Asts: Bonga 7

Cairo Stadium Indoor Halls Complex, Cairo
Referees: Fernando Calatrava (ESP), Matthew Beattie (AUS), Michael Scott (CAN)

=== Semifinals ===
8 July 2017
18:00

Boxscore

Spain	63–66	Italy
Scoring by quarter: 22–9, 8–20, 16–16, 17–21
Pts: Font 15; Rebs: Vila 12; Asts: Figueras 5		Pts: Bucarelli 15; Rebs: Oxilia 7 Asts: Bucarelli 5

Cairo Stadium Indoor Halls Complex, Cairo
Referees: Aleksandar Glišić (SRB), Omar Bermúdez (MEX), Yener Yılmaz (TUR)

8 July 2017
20:30

Boxscore

Canada	99–87	United States
Scoring by quarter: 17–23, 28–19, 21–17, 33–28
Pts: Barrett 38; Rebs: Barrett 13; Asts: Barrett 5		Pts: Washington 17; Rebs: Wiley 17; Asts: Pritchard 4

Cairo Stadium Indoor Halls Complex, Cairo
Referees: Leandro Lezcano (ARG), Daniel García (VEN), Takaki Kato (JPN)

=== 15th place game ===
9 July 2017
11:30

Boxscore

Mali	61–70	Iran
Scoring by quarter: 13–26, 14–14, 16–18, 18–12
Pts: Keita 15; Rebs: Sissoko 10; Asts: Dembélé 4		Pts: Samadi 21; Rebs: Khandanpour 11; Asts: Kamalvand, Samadi 3

Cairo Stadium Indoor Halls Complex, Cairo
Referees: Michael Scott (CAN), Gonzalo Salgueiro (URU), Arturas Šukys (LTU)

=== 13th place game ===
9 July 2017
13:00

Boxscore

Angola	58–56	South Korea
Scoring by quarter: 11–18, 17–9, 15–19, 15–10
Pts: Sousa 27; Rebs: Sousa 21; Asts: Dundão, Sousa 3		Pts: Yang Ja. 17; Rebs: Yang Ja. 15; Asts: Park J. 4

Cairo Stadium Indoor Halls Complex, Cairo
Referees: Andres Bartel (URU), Sofiane Si Youcef (ALG), Tanel Suslov (EST)

=== Eleventh place game ===
9 July 2017
15:30

Boxscore

New Zealand	85–69	Egypt
Scoring by quarter: 22–8, 16–22, 17–21, 30–18
Pts: Samuel, Wynyard 17; Rebs: Wynyard 10; Asts: Letoa 9		Pts: Youssef 22; Rebs: Mostafa 7 Asts: Youssef 5

Cairo Stadium Indoor Halls Complex, Cairo
Referees: Yener Yılmaz (TUR), Matthew Myers (USA), Zdravko Rutešić (MNE)

=== Ninth place game ===
9 July 2017
13:45

Boxscore

Puerto Rico	68–67	Japan
Scoring by quarter: 17–17, 12–16, 22–16, 17–18
Pts: Pacheco 19; Rebs: Cruz 7 Asts: Allende, Pacheco 4		Pts: Hachimura 27; Rebs: Hachimura 11; Asts: Shigetomi, Sugimoto 4

Cairo Stadium Indoor Halls Complex, Cairo
Referees: Omar Bermúdez (MEX), Matthew Beattie (AUS), Ivor Matějek (CZE)

=== Seventh place game ===
9 July 2017
16:00

Boxscore

France	69–63	Argentina
Scoring by quarter: 15–17, 17–17, 15–17, 22–12
Pts: Tillie 17; Rebs: Tillie 12; Asts: Goudou, Tillie 5		Pts: Corvalan 16; Rebs: Lema 9 Asts: Corvalan 6

Cairo Stadium Indoor Halls Complex, Cairo
Referees: Fernando Calatrava (ESP), Julio Anaya (PAN), Wojciech Liszka (POL)

=== Fifth place game ===
9 July 2017
18:15

Boxscore

Germany	80–74	Lithuania
Scoring by quarter: 13–23, 15–16, 23–18, 29–17
Pts: Da Silva 18; Rebs: Lagerpusch 7 Asts: three players 3		Pts: Kulboka, Sedekerskis 14; Rebs: Masiulis 11; Asts: Sedekerskis 4

Cairo Stadium Indoor Halls Complex, Cairo
Referees: Mehdi Difallah (FRA), Matthew Townsend (AUS), Nan Ye (CHN)

=== Bronze medal match ===
9 July 2017
18:00

Boxscore

United States	96–72	Spain
Scoring by quarter: 25–8, 24–22, 19–15, 28–27
Pts: Edwards 13; Rebs: McCoy 9 Asts: Pritchard 6		Pts: Rosa 24; Rebs: Vila 7 Asts: Figueras 7

Cairo Stadium Indoor Halls Complex, Cairo
Referees: Manuel Mazzoni (ITA), Leandro Lezcano (ARG), Sebastian Negron (CHI)

=== Final ===
9 July 2017
20:30

Boxscore

Canada	79–60	Italy
Scoring by quarter: 24–10, 27–26, 18–12, 10–12
Pts: Barrett 18; Rebs: Barrett 12; Asts: Barrett 4		Pts: Okeke 14; Rebs: Okeke 10; Asts: Bucarelli 6

Cairo Stadium Indoor Halls Complex, Cairo
Referees: Aleksandar Glišić (SRB), Daniel Gacía (VEN), Takaki Kato (JPN)

== Final standings ==
Rank	Team	Record
1st place, gold medalist(s)	Canada	6–1
2nd place, silver medalist(s)	Italy	5–2
3rd place, bronze medalist(s)	United States	6–1
4th	Spain	5–2
5th	Germany	5–2
6th	Lithuania	5–2
7th	France	5–2
8th	Argentina	3–4
9th	Puerto Rico	3–4
10th	Japan	3–4
11th	New Zealand	3–4
12th	Egypt	2–5
13th	Angola	3–4
14th	South Korea	1–6
15th	Iran	1–6
16th	Mali	0–7

== Statistics and awards ==
=== Statistical leaders ===
Points

Name	PPG
(Canada) R. J. Barrett	21.6
(Japan) Rui Hachimura	20.6
(Angola) Sílvio Sousa	17.3
(Lithuania) Tadas Sedekerskis	15.4
(Canada) Abu Kigab	14.7

Rebounds

Name	RPG
(Angola) Sílvio Sousa	13.1
(Egypt) Ahmed Khalaf	12.8
(Japan) Rui Hachimura	11.0
(Spain) Eric Vila	10.9
(United States) Austin Wiley	10.9

Assists

Name	APG
(Argentina) Facundo Corvalán	6.1
(South Korea) Park Ji-won	5.7
(Spain) Pol Figueras	5.7
(Egypt) Mohamed Youssef	5.3
(Lithuania) Rokas Jokubaitis	5.3

Blocks

Name	BPG
(Egypt) Ahmed Khalaf	3.0
(New Zealand) Tai Wynyard	2.0
(United States) Brandon McCoy	1.6
(Iran) Amir Hossein Khandanpour	1.5
(Germany) Oscar da Silva	1.4
(Japan) Rui Hachimura	1.4

Steals

Name	SPG
(Angola) Eric Amândio	2.1
(Puerto Rico) Jesús Cruz	1.9
(Puerto Rico) Gerardo Texeira	1.9
(Canada) R. J. Barrett	1.7
(Germany) Oscar da Silva	1.7
(Italy) Lorenzo Penna	1.7
(Spain) Pol Figueras	1.7
(United States) Cameron Reddish	1.7

=== Awards ===
2017 Under-19 World Championship winner

Canada
First title

Most Valuable Player
(Canada) R. J. Barrett

All-Tournament Team

- (United States) Payton Pritchard
- (Canada) R. J. Barrett
- (Italy) Lorenzo Bucarelli
- (Italy) Tommaso Oxilia
- (Canada) Abu Kigab
