= David Okeke =

Italian basketball player

Njarðvík
- Position: Small forward / power forward
- League: Úrvalsdeild karla

Personal information
- Born: 15 September 1998 (age 28) Monza, Italy
- Listed height: 206 cm (6 ft 9 in)
- Listed weight: 104 kg (229 lb)

Career information
- Playing career: 2015–present

Career history
- 2015–2016: Oleggio Magic
- 2016–2018: Auxilium Torino
- 2021: Rustavi
- 2021–2023: Keflavík
- 2023–2024: Haukar
- 2024–2026: Álftanes
- 2026: Club Deportes Las Animas
- 2026–present: Njarðvík

Career highlights
- Georgian Superliga champion (2021); Italian Cup winner (2018)
Medals
Men's basketball
Representing Italy
FIBA Under-19 World Cup
Silver medal – second place	2017 Egypt

David Albright Okeke (born 15 September 1998) is an Italian professional basketball player of Nigerian descent. In 2021, he won the Georgian Superliga championship with BC Rustavi.

== Career ==
Born in Monza, Italy, Okeke grew up in Robbio and Novara. After playing football, he got his basketball career underway, playing at Mortara, Stella Azzurra Roma and Casale. In the 2014–15 season, Okeke averaged 8.5 points a game for Borgomanero Basket Giovane in Italy’s Serie C.

Climbing the ranks, he competed in the national second-tier Serie B in the 2015–16 season, tallying 4.0 points a contest for Oleggio Magic Basket.

The 2016–17 season saw Okeke make his debut in Italy’s top-flight LBA after signing with Auxilium Torino, known as Fiat Torino for sponsorship reasons. He averaged 2.3 points and 1.4 rebounds per contest in his first Serie A season.

In the 2017–18 season, Okeke won the Italian Basketball Cup with Torino. He also made his European debut with Torino, playing in the EuroCup, where he played 12.5 minutes per game. In these minutes, he managed to average 4 points on 72% field goal shooting.

In 2019, he declared for the NBA draft. He went undrafted in the 2019 NBA draft.

After almost three years without playing basketball for health reasons (Heart), Okeke made his comeback with Georgian side BC Rustavi in January 2021. In 18 games, he averaged 9.3 points and 6.8 rebounds, helping the team to the Georgian Superliga championship.

In August 2021, Okeke signed with Úrvalsdeild karla club Keflavík. On 28 October 2021, Okeke scored a season high 31 points in a victory against Breiðablik. On 10 December 2021, he suffered an achilles injury in a game against Tindastóll. Prior to the injury he had grabbed a season high 17 rebounds in the game. In 9 games, he averaged 19.6 points and 11.2 rebounds per game. In April 2022, it was reported that he had signed with Keflavík for the following season.

In June 2023, Okeke signed with Úrvalsdeild club Haukar. On 24 November 2023, he temporary stepped away from competition against Tindastóll following a health-related incident during the game. He returned to the professional play in January 2024.

In September 2024, Okeke signed with Álftanes.

After two season with Álftanes, he signed with Club Deportes Las Animas in Chile in June 2026. He left the club in August after averging 16.6 points and 9.9 rebounds. In October 2026, Okeke returned to Iceland and signed with Njarðvík.

== National team career ==
Okeke was a member of Italy’s team at the 2017 FIBA Under-19 World Cup in Cairo, when the team won silver. Okeke saw action in seven games during the tournament, averaging 11 points and 6.3 rebounds per outing.
