= July 2017 in sports =

<<	July 2017					>>
Su	Mo	Tu	We	Th	Fr	Sa
						1
2	3	4	5	6	7	8
9	10	11	12	13	14	15
16	17	18	19	20	21	22
23	24	25	26	27	28	29
30	31
Sports

This list shows notable sports-related events and notable outcomes that occurred in July of 2017.

== Events calendar ==
Date	Sport	Venue/Event	Status	Winner/s
1	Athletics	(France) Meeting de Paris (Diamond League #7)	International	Jamaica
1–2	Ultramarathon	(United Kingdom) 2017 IAU 24 Hour World Championship	International	Men: (Japan) Yoshihiko Ishikawa; Women: (Poland) Patrycja Bereznowska
1–8	Speedway	(United Kingdom) / (Sweden) / (Poland) 2017 Speedway World Cup	International	Poland (Maciej Janowski/Piotr Pawlicki Jr./Bartosz Zmarzlik/Patryk Dudek/Bartosz Smektała)
1–9	Association football	(Turkey) 2017 UEFA Regions' Cup Final Tournament	Continental	(Croatia) Zagreb
1–9	Basketball	(Egypt) 2017 FIBA Under-19 Basketball World Cup	International	Canada
1–15	Rugby union	(Samoa) / (Tonga) 2017 World Rugby Pacific Nations Cup	Regional	Fiji
1–23	Road cycling	2017 Tour de France	International	(United Kingdom) Chris Froome ( (United Kingdom) Team Sky)
2	Motorcycle racing	(Germany) 2017 German motorcycle Grand Prix	International	MotoGP: (Spain) Marc Marquez ( (Japan) Repsol Honda Team); Moto2: (Italy) Franco Morbidelli ( (Belgium) EG 0,0 Marc VDS); Moto3: (Spain) Joan Mir ( (Germany) Leopard Racing)
2–15	Association football	(Georgia (country)) 2017 UEFA European Under-19 Championship	Continental	England
3–9	Snooker	(China) 2017 World Cup	International	China A (Ding Junhui / Liang Wenbo)
3–16	Tennis	(United Kingdom) 2017 Wimbledon Championships (Grand Slam #3)	International	Men: (Switzerland) Roger Federer; Women: (Spain) Garbiñe Muguruza
4–18	Multi-sport	(Israel) 2017 Maccabiah Games	International	Israel
6	Athletics	(Switzerland) Athletissima (Diamond League #8)	International	United States
6–9	Athletics	(India) 2017 Asian Athletics Championships	Continental	India
7–16	Softball	(Canada) 2017 Men's Softball World Championship	International	New Zealand
7–26	Association football	(United States) 2017 CONCACAF Gold Cup	Continental	United States
7–6 August	Volleyball	(China) / (Czech Republic) / (Australia) 2017 FIVB Volleyball World Grand Prix	International	Group 1: Brazil; Group 2: Poland; Group 3:Hungary
8–16	Basketball	(Portugal) 2017 FIBA Europe Under-20 Championship for Women	Continental	Spain
9	Athletics	(United Kingdom) London Grand Prix (Diamond League #9)	International	United States
9	Formula One	(Austria) 2017 Austrian Grand Prix	International	(Finland) Valtteri Bottas ( (Germany) Mercedes)
10–12	Golf	(United States) Senior LPGA Championship	International	(England) Trish Johnson
11	Baseball	(United States) 2017 Major League Baseball All-Star Game	Domestic	American League; MVP: (Dominican Republic) Robinson Canó ( (Washington (state)) Seattle Mariners); Home Run Derby: (California) Aaron Judge ( (New York (state)) New York Yankees)
11–16	Beach handball	(Mauritius) 2017 Youth Beach Handball World Championship	International	Men: Spain; Women: Hungary
11–16	Beach volleyball	(China) 2017 FIVB Beach Volleyball U21 World Championships	International	Men: Brazil (Adrielson dos Santos Silva & Renato Andrew Lima de Carvalho); Women: Brazil (Eduarda Santos Lisboa & Ana Patricia Silva Ramos)
12–16	Athletics	(Kenya) 2017 World U18 Championships in Athletics	International	South Africa
12–22	Lacrosse	(England) 2017 Women's Lacrosse World Cup	International	United States
13–16	Athletics	(Poland) 2017 European Athletics U23 Championships	Continental	Germany
13–16	Golf	(United States) 2017 U.S. Women's Open	International	(South Korea) Park Sung-hyun
13–16	Golf	(United States) Senior Players Championship	International	(United States) Scott McCarron
13–16	Multi-sport	(United States) X Games Minneapolis 2017	International	United States
14–16	Canoe sprint	(Bulgaria) 2017 Canoe Sprint European Championships	Continental	Hungary
14–23	Athletics	(United Kingdom) 2017 World Para Athletics Championships	International	China
14–23	Volleyball	(Mexico) 2017 FIVB Volleyball Women's U20 World Championship	International	China
14–23	Table tennis	(Portugal) 2017 Table Tennis European Youth Championships	Continental	Boys: (Greece) Ioannis Sgouropoulos; Girls: (Azerbaijan) Ning Jing
14–30	Aquatics	(Hungary) 2017 World Aquatics Championships	International	United States
15–16	Formula E	(United States) 2017 New York ePrix	International	Race 1: (United Kingdom) Sam Bird ( (United Kingdom) DS Virgin Racing); Race 2: (United Kingdom) Sam Bird ( (United Kingdom) DS Virgin Racing)
15–16	Triathlon	(Germany) 2017 ITU World Triathlon Series #5	International	Men: (Spain) Mario Mola; Women: (Bermuda) Flora Duffy
15–23	Basketball	(Greece) 2017 FIBA Europe Under-20 Championship	Continental	Greece
16	Formula One	(United Kingdom) 2017 British Grand Prix	International	(United Kingdom) Lewis Hamilton ( (Germany) Mercedes)
16	Athletics	(Morocco) Meeting International Mohammed VI d'Athlétisme de Rabat (Diamond League #10)	International	Poland
16–6 August	Association football	(Netherlands) UEFA Women's Euro 2017	Continental	Netherlands
17–24	Modern pentathlon	(Belarus) 2017 European Modern Pentathlon Championships	Continental	Men: (Russia) Aleksander Lesun; Women: (Belarus) Anastasiya Prokopenko
18–23	Track cycling	(Portugal) 2017 UEC European Track Championships (under-23 & junior)	Continental	Italy
18–23	Multi-sport	(The Bahamas) 2017 Commonwealth Youth Games	International	England
18–30	Association football	(United States) / (China) / (Singapore) 2017 International Champions Cup	International	USA: (Spain) Barcelona; China: (Germany) Borussia Dortmund; Singapore: (Italy) Internazionale
18–30	Multi-sport	(Turkey) 2017 Summer Deaflympics	International	Russia
18–30	Handball	(Algeria) 2017 Men's Junior World Handball Championship	International	Spain
19	1:10 R/C off-road	(Italy) 2017 EFRA European 1:10 Electric Off-Road Championship	Continental	2WD: (United Kingdom) Lee Martin
19–23	Rowing	(Bulgaria) 2017 World Rowing U23 Championships	International	Italy
19–26	Fencing	(Germany) 2017 World Fencing Championships	International	Italy
19–29	Squash	(New Zealand) 2017 World Junior Squash Championships	International	Men: Marwan Tarek; Women: Rowan Reda Araby; Team: Egypt
20–23	Athletics	(Italy) 2017 European Athletics U20 Championships	Continental	Germany
20–23	Golf	(England) 2017 Open Championship	International	(United States) Jordan Spieth
20–30	Multi-sport	(Poland) 2017 World Games	International	Russia
21	Athletics	(Monaco) Herculis (Diamond League #11)	International	United States
21–30	Multi-sport	(Ivory Coast) 2017 Jeux de la Francophonie	International	France
21–4 August	Shooting sports	(Azerbaijan) 2017 European Shooting Championships	Continental	Ukraine
22	1:10 R/C off-road	(Italy) 2017 EFRA European 1:10 Electric Off-Road Championship	Continental	4WD: (Portugal) Bruno Coelho
22–23	Triathlon	(Hungary) 2017 ITU Triathlon World Cup #7	International	Men: (Hungary) Bence Bicsák; Women: (United States) Renee Tomlin
22–30	Basketball	(Italy) 2017 FIBA Under-19 Women's Basketball World Cup	International	Russia
22–30	Darts	(England) 2017 World Matchplay	International	(England) Phil Taylor
22–30	Multi-sport	(Hungary) 2017 European Youth Summer Olympic Festival	Continental	Russia
23–29	Basketball	(India) 2017 FIBA Women's Asia Cup	Continental	Japan
23–30	Weightlifting	(United States) 2017 Pan American Weightlifting Championships	Continental	Men's Team: Colombia; Women's Team: Colombia
24–30	Softball	(United States) 2017 Junior Women's Softball World Championship	International	United States
24–1 August	Volleyball	(Indonesia) 2017 Asian Men's Volleyball Championship	Continental	Japan
25–29	BMX	(United States) 2017 UCI BMX World Championships	International	Men: (United States) Corben Sharrah; Women: (United States) Alise Post
27–30	Golf	(Wales) The Senior Open Championship	International	(Germany) Bernhard Langer
27–30	Canoeing	(Romania) 2017 ICF Junior and U23 Canoe Sprint World Championships	International	Junior: Hungary; U23: Belarus; Overall: Hungary
27–30	Rallying	2017 Rally Finland (WRC #9)	International	(Finland) Esapekka Lappi & Janne Ferm ( (Japan) Toyota)
28–29	Triathlon	(Canada) 2017 ITU World Triathlon Series #6	International	Men: (Spain) Mario Mola; Women: (Bermuda) Flora Duffy
28–6 August	Baseball	(Taiwan) 2017 12U Baseball World Cup	International	United States
28–6 August	Beach volleyball	(Austria) 2017 Beach Volleyball World Championships	International	Men: Brazil (Evandro Oliveira & André Stein); Women: Germany (Laura Ludwig & Kira Walkenhorst)
28–13 August	Multi-sport	(Manitoba) 2017 Canada Summer Games	Domestic	Ontario
29–30	Formula E	(Canada) 2017 Montreal ePrix	International	Race 1: (Brazil) Lucas di Grassi ( (Germany) Audi Sport ABT); Race 2: (France) Jean-Éric Vergne ( (China) Techeetah)
29–6 August	Basketball	(Slovakia) 2017 FIBA Europe Under-18 Championship	Continental	Serbia
30	Formula One	(Hungary) 2017 Hungarian Grand Prix	International	(Germany) Sebastian Vettel ( (Italy) Ferrari)
30	Endurance motorcycle racing	(Japan) 2017 Suzuka 8 Hours (EWC #5)	International	(Japan) Katsuyuki Nakasuga/ (United Kingdom) Alex Lowes/ (Netherlands) Michael van der Mark ( (Japan) Yamaha Factory Racing Team)
