= Oleggio (disambiguation) =

Oleggio is an comune in the Province of Novara in the Italian region Piedmont.

Oleggio may also refer to:

- Oleggio Castello, comune in the Province of Novara in the Italian region of Piedmont
- Oleggio Magic Basket, basketball team in Oleggio, Italy
- Luino–Oleggio railway, a railway line in Lombardy, Italy
