= November 2017 in sports =

| << | November 2017 | | | | | >> |
| Su | Mo | Tu | We | Th | Fr | Sa |
| | | | 1 | 2 | 3 | 4 |
| 5 | 6 | 7 | 8 | 9 | 10 | 11 |
| 12 | 13 | 14 | 15 | 16 | 17 | 18 |
| 19 | 20 | 21 | 22 | 23 | 24 | 25 |
| 26 | 27 | 28 | 29 | 30 |
Sports

This list shows notable sports-related events and notable outcomes that occurred in November of 2017.

| Date | Sport | Venue/Event | Status | Winner/s |
|---|---|---|---|---|
| 2–9 | Curling | (Australia) 2017 Pacific-Asia Curling Championships | Continental | Men: South Korea (Skip: Kim Chang-min); Women: South Korea (Skip: Kim Eun-jung) |
| 3–4 | Horse racing | (United States) 2017 Breeders' Cup | International | Breeders' Cup Classic: Horse: (United States) Gun Runner; Jockey: (France) Florent Geroux; Trainer: (United States) Steve Asmussen; See here for other results. |
| 4 | Triathlon | (Japan) 2017 ITU Triathlon World Cup #15 | International | Men: (Belgium) Marten Van Riel; Women: (United States) Summer Cook |
| 5 | Cyclo-cross | (Czech Republic) 2017 UEC European Cyclo-cross Championships | Continental | Belgium |
| 5 | Athletics | (United States) 2017 New York City Marathon (WMM #6) | International | Men: (Kenya) Geoffrey Kamworor; Women: (United States) Shalane Flanagan |
| 6–12 | Snooker | (England) 2017 Champion of Champions | International | (England) Shaun Murphy |
| 6–19 | Chess | (Italy) 2017 World Senior Chess Championship | International | Open +50: (Peru) Julio Granda; Open +65: (Russia) Evgeny Sveshnikov; Women +50: (Luxembourg) Elvira Berend; Women 65+: (Georgia (country)) Tamar Khmiadashvili |
| 7 | Horse racing | (Australia) 2017 Melbourne Cup | International | Horse: (United Kingdom) Rekindling; Jockey: (Australia) Corey Brown; Trainer: (Republic of Ireland) Joseph O'Brien |
| 7–11 | Tennis | (Italy) 2017 Next Generation ATP Finals | International | (South Korea) Chung Hyeon |
| 8–12 | Carom billiards | (Bolivia) 2017 UMB World Three-cushion Championship | International | (Belgium) Frédéric Caudron |
| 8–12 | Cycle sport | (China) 2017 UCI Urban Cycling World Championships | International | France |
| 9–12 | Trampolining | (Bulgaria) 2017 Trampoline World Championships | International | China |
| 10–11 | Rugby sevens | (Fiji) 2017 Oceania Sevens Championship (Fiji) 2017 Oceania Women's Sevens Championship | Continental | Men: Fiji; Women: New Zealand |
| 10–12 | Judo | (Montenegro) 2017 European U23 Judo Championships | Continental | Russia |
| 11–12 | Judo | (Morocco) 2017 World Judo Open Championships | International | Men: (France) Teddy Riner; Women: (Japan) Sarah Asahina |
| 11–12 | Tennis | (Belarus) 2017 Fed Cup Final | International | United States |
| 11–18 | International rules football | (Australia) 2017 International Rules Series | International | Australia |
| 11–19 | 1:10 R/C off-road | (China) 2017 IFMAR 1:10 Electric Off-Road World Championships | International | (United States) Ryan Maifield |
| 11–19 | Darts | (England) 2017 Grand Slam of Darts | International | (Netherlands) Michael van Gerwen |
| 11–25 | Multi-sport | (Colombia) 2017 Bolivarian Games | Regional | Colombia |
| 12 | Formula One | (Brazil) 2017 Brazilian Grand Prix | International | (Germany) Sebastian Vettel ( (Italy) Ferrari) |
| 12 | Motorcycle racing | 2017 Valencian Community motorcycle Grand Prix | International | MotoGP: (Spain) Dani Pedrosa ( (Belgium) Repsol Honda); Moto2: (Portugal) Miguel Oliveira ( (Finland) Ajo Motorsport); Moto3: (Spain) Jorge Martín ( (Italy) Gresini Racing) |
| 12–19 | Tennis | (United Kingdom) 2017 ATP World Tour Finals | International | Singles: (Bulgaria) Grigor Dimitrov; Doubles: (Finland) Henri Kontinen / (Australia) John Peers |
| 12–26 | Chess | (Italy) 2017 World Junior Chess Championship | International | Men: (Norway) Aryan Tari; Women: (Kazakhstan) Zhansaya Abdumalik |
| 16–2 December | Rugby league | (Australia) 2017 Women's Rugby League World Cup | International | Australia |
| 16–17 | Desert racing | (Mexico) 2017 Baja 1000 | International | Cars & Trucks: Mexico (Juan C. Lopez & Apdaly Lopez); Motocycle: (Guatemala) Francisco Arredondo, (United States) Shane; Esposito, (United States) Justin Morgan, (United States) Max Eddy Jr., & (United States) Ty Davis |
| 16–19 | Baseball | (Japan) 2017 Asia Professional Baseball Championship | Continental | Japan |
| 17–19 | Rallying | 2017 Rally Australia (WRC #13) | International | (Belgium) Thierry Neuville & Nicolas Gilsoul ( (South Korea) Hyundai) |
| 17–25 | Curling | (Switzerland) 2017 European Curling Championships | International | Men: Sweden (Skip: Niklas Edin); Women: Scotland (Skip: Eve Muirhead) |
| 17–26 | Field hockey | (New Zealand) 2016–17 Women's FIH Hockey World League Final | International | Netherlands |
| 18–25 | Association football | (Saudi Arabia) / (Japan) 2017 AFC Champions League Final | Continental | (Japan) Urawa Red Diamonds |
| 19–25 | Futsal | (Catalonia) 2017 AMF Futsal Women's World Cup | International | Brazil |
| 21–26 | Wrestling | (Poland) 2017 World U23 Wrestling Championship | International | Men's Freestyle: Russia; Women's Freestyle: Japan; Greco-Roman: Georgia |
| 22–29 | Association football | (Brazil) / (Argentina) 2017 Copa Libertadores Finals | Continental | (Brazil) Grêmio |
| 23–8 January 2018 | Cricket | (Australia) 2017–18 Ashes series | International | Australia |
| 24–26 | Tennis | (France) 2017 Davis Cup Final | International | France |
| 24–1 December | Archery | (Bangladesh) 2017 Asian Archery Championships | Continental | South Korea |
| 24–4 December | Ten-pin bowling | (United States) 2017 World Tenpin Bowling Championships | International | United States |
| 26 | Formula One | (United Arab Emirates) 2017 Abu Dhabi Grand Prix | International | (Finland) Valtteri Bottas ( (Germany) Mercedes) |
| 26 | Horse racing | 2017 Japan Cup | International | Horse: (Japan) Cheval Grand; Jockey: (Australia) Hugh Bowman; Trainer: (Japan) Yasuo Tomomichi |
| 26 | Canadian football | (Canada) 105th Grey Cup | Domestic | (Ontario) Toronto Argonauts |
| 26–3 December | Table tennis | (Italy) 2017 World Junior Table Tennis Championships | International | China |
| 27–2 December | Canoe freestyle | (Argentina) 2017 ICF Canoe Freestyle World Championships | International | Great Britain |
| 27–3 December | Squash | (France) 2017 Men's World Team Squash Championships | International | Egypt |
| 28–5 December | Weightlifting | (United States) 2017 World Weightlifting Championships | International | Iran and Colombia (a tie with 2 gold, 1 silver, & 2 bronze each) |
| 28–10 December | Snooker | (England) 2017 UK Championship (Triple Crown #1) | International | (England) Ronnie O'Sullivan |
| 30–1 December | Rugby sevens | (United Arab Emirates) 2017 Dubai Women's Sevens (WRWSS #1) | International | Australia |
