= October 2017 in sports =

<<	October 2017					>>
Su	Mo	Tu	We	Th	Fr	Sa
1	2	3	4	5	6	7
8	9	10	11	12	13	14
15	16	17	18	19	20	21
22	23	24	25	26	27	28
29	30	31
Sports

This list shows notable sports-related events and notable outcomes that occurred in October of 2017.

== Events calendar ==
Date	Sport	Venue/Event	Status	Winner/s
1	Formula One	(Malaysia) 2017 Malaysian Grand Prix	International	(Netherlands) Max Verstappen ( (Austria) Red Bull Racing)
1	Horse racing	(France) 2017 Prix de l'Arc de Triomphe	International	Horse: (United Kingdom) Enable; Jockey: (Italy) Frankie Dettori; Trainer: (United Kingdom) John Gosden
1–7	Darts	(Republic of Ireland) 2017 World Grand Prix	International	(Northern Ireland) Daryl Gurney
2–8	Artistic gymnastics	(Canada) 2017 Artistic Gymnastics World Championships	International	All-Around Men: Xiao Ruoteng; All-Around Women: (United States) Morgan Hurd; Medal Table: China
2–8	Archery	(Argentina) 2017 World Archery Youth Championships	International	United States
6–7	Rugby sevens	(Uganda) 2017 Africa Cup Sevens	Continental	Uganda
6–8	Rallying	(Spain) 2017 Rally Catalunya (WRC #11)	International	(United Kingdom) Kris Meeke & (Republic of Ireland) Paul Nagle ( (France) Citroën)
6–14	Curling	(Switzerland) 2017 World Mixed Curling Championship	International	Scotland (Skip: Grant Hardie)
6–28	Association football	(India) 2017 FIFA U-17 World Cup	International	England
7	Road bicycle racing	(Italy) 2017 Il Lombardia ('Monument' #5)	International	(Italy) Vincenzo Nibali ( Bahrain–Merida)
7–8	Triathlon	(United States) 2017 ITU Triathlon World Cup #12	International	Men: (Mexico) Rodrigo González; Women: (Japan) Juri Ide
7–14	Volleyball	(Cameroon) 2017 Women's African Volleyball Championship	Continental	Cameroon
7–15	Volleyball	(Trinidad and Tobago) 2017 Women's NORCECA Volleyball Championship	Continental	Pool A: Dominican Republic; Pool B: Canada; Pool C: Mexico
8	Formula One	(Japan) 2017 Japanese Grand Prix	International	(United Kingdom) Lewis Hamilton ( (Germany) Mercedes)
8	Athletics	(United States) 2017 Chicago Marathon (WMM #5)	International	Men: (United States) Galen Rupp; Women: (Ethiopia) Tirunesh Dibaba
8–15	Tennis	(China) 2017 Shanghai Masters	International	(Switzerland) Roger Federer
9–22	Badminton	(Indonesia) 2017 BWF World Junior Championships	International	Indonesia
11–15	Field hockey	(Australia) 2017 Oceania Cup	Continental	Men: Australia; Women: Australia
12–22	Field hockey	(Bangladesh) 2017 Men's Hockey Asia Cup	Continental	India
13–15	Rowing	(France) 2017 World Rowing Coastal Championships	International	Italy
14	Horse racing	(Australia) The Everest 2017	International	Horse: (Australia) Redzel; Jockey: (Australia) Kerrin McEvoy; Trainer: (Australia) Peter & Paul Snowden
14	Triathlon	(United States) 2017 Ironman World Championship	International	Men: (Germany) Patrick Lange; Women: (Switzerland) Daniela Ryf
15–28	Association football	(China) 2017 AFC U-19 Women's Championship	Continental	Japan
15	Motorcycle racing	(Japan) 2017 Japanese motorcycle Grand Prix	International	MotoGP: (Italy) Andrea Dovizioso ( (Italy) Ducati Corse); Moto2: (Spain) Álex Márquez ( (Belgium) EG 0,0 Marc VDS); Moto3: (Italy) Romano Fenati ( (Italy) Marinelli Rivacold Snipers)
15–21	Weightlifting	(Albania) 2017 European Junior & U23 Weightlifting Championships	Continental	Armenia
15–22	Archery	(Mexico) 2017 World Archery Championships	International	South Korea
19–22	Track cycling	(Germany) 2017 UEC European Track Championships	Continental	Germany
20–22	Table tennis	(Belgium) 2017 ITTF Men's World Cup	International	(Germany) Dimitrij Ovtcharov
21–29	Polo	(Australia) 2017 World Polo Championship	International	Argentina
22	Formula One	2017 United States Grand Prix	International	(United Kingdom) Lewis Hamilton ( (Germany) Mercedes)
22	Motorcycle racing	(Australia) 2017 Australian motorcycle Grand Prix	International	MotoGP: (Spain) Marc Márquez ( (Japan) Repsol Honda Team); Moto2: (Portugal) Miguel Oliveira ( (Finland) Red Bull KTM Ajo); Moto3: (Spain) Joan Mir ( (Germany) Leopard Racing)
22–29	Field hockey	(Egypt) 2017 Hockey Africa Cup of Nations	Continental	Men: South Africa; Women: South Africa
22–29	Tennis	(Singapore) 2017 WTA Finals	International	Singles: (Denmark) Caroline Wozniacki; Doubles: (Hungary) Tímea Babos / (Czech Republic) Andrea Hlaváčková
22–29	Volleyball	(Egypt) 2017 Men's African Volleyball Championship	Continental	Tunisia
24–1 November	Baseball	(United States) 2017 World Series	Domestic	(Texas) Houston Astros
25–29	Karate	(Spain) 2017 World Junior, Cadet & U21 Karate Championships	International	Junior & Cadet: Japan; U21: Spain; Overall: Japan
26–29	Golf	(China) 2017 WGC-HSBC Champions	International	(England) Justin Rose
26–26 March 2018	Cricket	(Australia) 2017–18 Sheffield Shield	Domestic	Queensland
26–29	Rallying	(United Kingdom) 2017 Wales Rally GB (WRC #12)	International	(United Kingdom) Elfyn Evans & (United Kingdom) Daniel Barritt ( (United Kingdom) M-Sport)
27–29	Table tennis	(Canada) 2017 ITTF Women's World Cup	International	(China) Zhu Yuling
27–7 November	Chess	(Greece) 2017 European Team Chess Championship	Continental	Men: Azerbaijan; Women: Russia
27–2 December	Rugby league	(Australia) / (New Zealand) / (Papua New Guinea) 2017 Rugby League World Cup	International	Australia
28	Triathlon	(South Korea) 2017 ITU Triathlon World Cup #13	International	Men: (France) Aurélien Raphael; Women: (United States) Summer Cook
28–29	Netball	(Australia) 2017 Fast5 Netball World Series	International	England
28–4 November	Association football	(Egypt) / (Morocco) 2017 CAF Champions League Final	Continental	(Morocco) Wydad Casablanca
28–5 November	Field hockey	(Japan) 2017 Women's Hockey Asia Cup	Continental	India
29	Motorcycle racing	(Malaysia) 2017 Malaysian motorcycle Grand Prix	International	MotoGP: (Italy) Andrea Dovizioso ( (Italy) Ducati Team); Moto2: (Portugal) Miguel Oliveira ( (Finland) Red Bull KTM Ajo); Moto3: (Spain) Joan Mir ( (Germany) Leopard Racing)
29	Triathlon	(Ecuador) 2017 ITU Triathlon World Cup #14	International	Men: (Mexico) Crisanto Grajales; Women: (Ecuador) Elizabeth Bravo
29	Formula One	(Mexico) 2017 Mexican Grand Prix	International	(Netherlands) Max Verstappen ( (Austria) Red Bull Racing)
29–5 November	Snooker	(China) 2017 International Championship	International	(England) Mark Selby
30–5 November	Tennis	(France) 2017 Paris Masters	International	(United States) Jack Sock
31–4 November	Beach soccer	(United Arab Emirates) 2017 Beach Soccer Intercontinental Cup	International	Brazil
