= Libertas Liburnia Basket Livorno =

Italian basketball team

Libertas Livorno 1947
- Leagues: Serie A2
- Founded: 1947; 79 years ago (original); 2019 (re-founded)
- History: Polisportiva Libertas Livorno (1947–1991); Libertas Pallacanestro Livorno (1991–1994); Libertas Livorno Basket (1994–2004); Libertas Liburnia Basket Livorno (2004–2019); Libertas Livorno 1947 (2019–present)
- Arena: Modigliani Forum
- Capacity: 8,000
- Location: Livorno, Tuscany, Italy
- Team colors: Maroon, white
- President: Tommaso Fantoni
- Head coach: Andrea Diana
- Ownership: Benvenuti LLC
- 2025–26 position: 10th
- Championships: 1 Serie B (2023–24)
- Website: libertaslivorno1947.it
Home	Away	Third

Libertas Livorno 1947 is an Italian professional basketball team based in Livorno, Tuscany. Established originally in 1947, the team has been bankrupted and re-founded multiple times over its history. The club currently plays in the Serie A2, the second tier of Italian basketball. Livorno's home arena is the Modigliani Forum.

== History ==
Established in 1947, the side played in the first division Serie A from 1959 to 1968, in 1970-71 and again from 1981 to 1994 (with one season in the second division Serie A2. Merging with another Livorno side, Pallacanestro Livorno under the Libertas name, the side went bankrupt in 1994.

Another Livorno side Basket Livorno represented the city in the Serie A afterwards before itself filing bankruptcy. Libertas Liburnia Livorno, playing in the regional Serie C, is the symbolic heir to the side but was founded in 2004 with a new affiliation to the Italian federation.

== Sponsorship names ==
Throughout the years, due to sponsorship, the club has been known as :

Libertas Livorno

- Fargas Livorno (1966–68)
- Peroni Livorno (1982–85)
- Cortan Livorno (1985–86)
- Boston Livorno (1986–87)
- Enichem Livorno (1987–89)
- Enimont Livorno (1989–90)
- Baker Livorno (1991–94)

Pallacanestro Livorno

- Magnadyne Livorno (1980–81)
- Rapident Livorno (1981–84)
- O.T.C. Livorno (1984–85)
- Allibert Livorno (1985–89)
- Garessio 2000 Livorno (1989–90)
- Tombolini Livorno (1990–91)

== Current roster ==
Note: Flags indicate national team eligibility at FIBA-sanctioned events. Players may hold other non-FIBA nationalities not displayed.

Libertas Livorno 1947 roster
Players
Coaches

Pos.	No.	Nat.	Name	Ht.	Age
G	1	(Italy)	Gaeta, Filippo	1.90 m (6 ft 3 in)	17 – 26 May 2009
SG	3	(United States)	Graves, Jayvon	1.91 m (6 ft 3 in)	27 – 29 December 1998
PF	5	(United States)	Tiby, Matthew	2.03 m (6 ft 8 in)	33 – 19 December 1992
PG	7	(Italy)	Valentini, Fabio	1.85 m (6 ft 1 in)	27 – 25 August 1999
F	11	(Italy)	Tozzi, Luca	2.00 m (6 ft 7 in)	27 – 9 October 1999
SG	14	(Italy)	Piccoli, Matteo	1.95 m (6 ft 5 in)	31 – 2 April 1995
F	23	(Italy)	Sakine, Eduardo	2.02 m (6 ft 8 in)	18 – 29 January 2008
PG	24	(Italy)	Penna, Lorenzo	1.80 m (5 ft 11 in)	28 – 21 January 1998
G	25	(Italy) (Ghana)	Cournooh, David	1.88 m (6 ft 2 in)	36 – 28 July 1990
C	33	(Italy)	Possamai, Luca	2.12 m (6 ft 11 in)	25 – 10 May 2001
F/C	53	(Italy)	Vildera, Giovanni	2.05 m (6 ft 9 in)	31 – 4 March 1995
G/F	75	(Italy)	Filoni, Niccolò	1.98 m (6 ft 6 in)	25 – 11 May 2001

Head coach

- (Italy) Andrea Diana

Assistant coach(es)

- (Italy) Alex Latini
- (Italy) Matteo Bonaccorsi

Legend

- (C) Team captain
- Injured

- Roster
Updated: October 30, 2026

== Notable players ==
Libertas Livorno:

- (Italy) Alessandro Fantozzi 10 seasons: '81-'91
- (Italy) Flavio Carera 9 seasons: '83-'92
- (Italy) Andrea Forti 9 seasons: '83-'92
- (Italy) Alberto Tonut 7 seasons: '84-'91
- (United States) Jeff Cook 1 season: '86-'87
- (United States) Lee Johnson 1 season: '87-'88
- (United States) Scott May 1 season: '87-'88
- (United States) Joe Binion 3 seasons: '88-'91
- (United States) Wendell Alexis 2 seasons: '88-'90
- (United States) David Wood 1 season: '88-'89
- (United States) Anthony Jones 1 season: '90-'91
- (United States) Jay Vincent 1 season: '91-'92
- (The Bahamas) Elvis Rolle 1 season: '91-'92
- (Italy) Maurizio Ragazzi 1 season: '91-'92
- (United States) (Italy) Micheal Ray Richardson 2 seasons: '92-'94
- (Croatia) Žan Tabak 1 season: '92-'93
- (United States) Clifton Riley 1 season: '93-'94
- (Italy) Gianmarco Pozzecco 1 season: '93-'94

Pallacanestro Livorno:

- (Italy) Claudio Bonaccorsi 8 seasons: '83-'91
- (The Bahamas) Elvis Rolle 5 seasons: '85-'88, '89-'91
- (United States) Rafael Addison 4 seasons: '87-'91
- (Italy) Nino Pellacani 1 season: '87-'88
- (United States) (Spain) Brad Wright 1 season: '88-'89
- (Italy) Leonardo Sonaglia 1 season: '90-'91
