= Abdoulaye N'Doye =

French basketball player (born 1998)

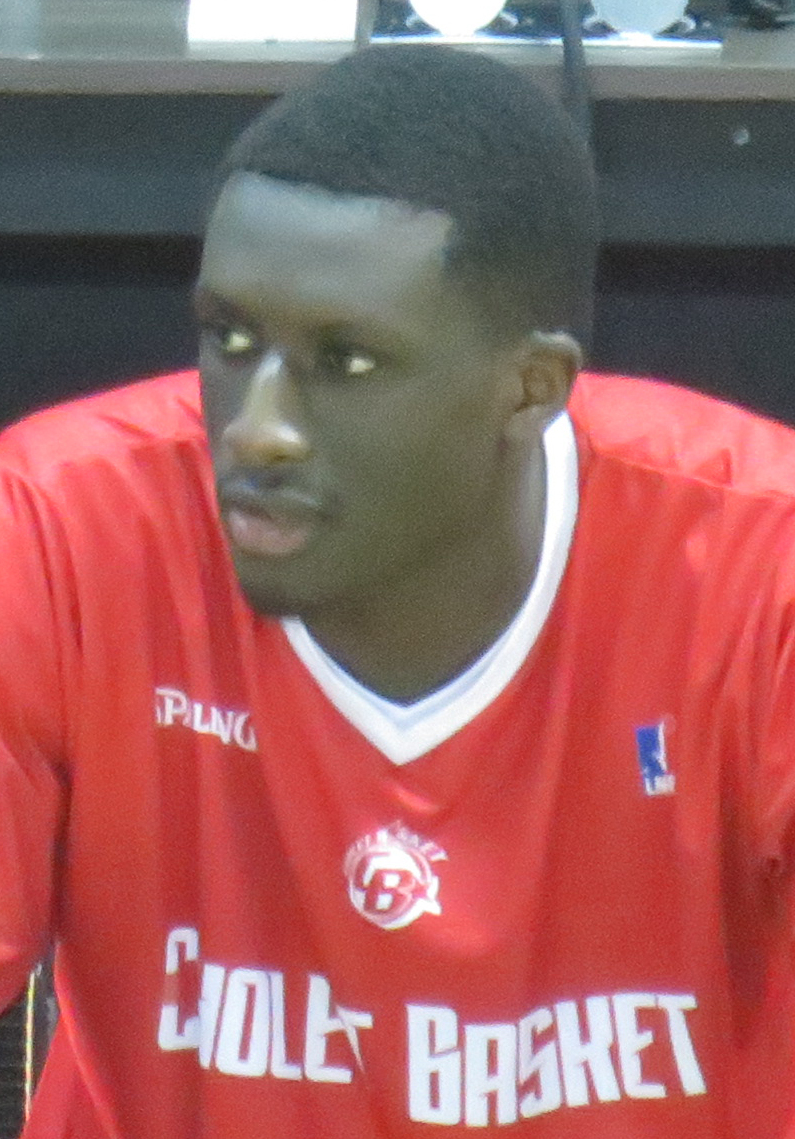
- N'Doye with Cholet in October 2018

No. 11 – SIG Strasbourg
- Position: Point guard / shooting guard
- League: LNB Élite; Champions League

Personal information
- Born: 9 March 1998 (age 28) Dunkirk, France
- Listed height: 1.95 m (6 ft 5 in)
- Listed weight: 93 kg (205 lb)

Career information
- NBA draft: 2020: undrafted
- Playing career: 2016–present

Career history
- 2016–2020: Cholet
- 2020–2021: Monaco
- 2021–2022: BCM Gravelines-Dunkerque
- 2022: REG
- 2022–2025: Le Mans
- 2025–present: SIG Strasbourg

Career highlights
- French League Cup winner (2025); EuroCup champion (2021); LNB All-Star (2019)
Medals
Men's basketball
Representing France
FIBA U18 European Championship
| Gold medal – first place | 2016 Turkey | Team |
FIBA U16 European Championship
| Gold medal – first place | 2014 Latvia | Team |

Abdoulaye N'Doye (born 9 March 1998) is a French professional basketball player for SIG Strasbourg of the French LNB Élite and the Champions League.

== Early life and career ==
N'Doye was born in Dunkirk, where his father, Oumar, was playing basketball for BCM Gravelines-Dunkerque of the LNB Pro A. In addition to basketball, he grew up playing tennis and handball. At age five, he started playing basketball for his local club, Dunkerque Malo, under his father's coaching. In 2010, N'Doye joined Olympique Grande-Synthe, before moving to Pôle Espoirs de Wattignies, a team representing the sports institute CREPS. Three years later, when he was 15 years old, he moved away from his home region to play for LNB Pro A club Cholet, initially at the youth level. In 2015, N'Doye won the national under-18 championship.

== Professional career ==
=== Cholet (2016–2020) ===
N'Doye gained his first experience with the Cholet senior team in the 2016–17 season, when he was 18 years old. On 14 August 2017, he signed his first professional contract with Cholet and began receiving regular playing time in the Pro A. In the 2018–19 season, N'Doye averaged 6.1 points, 3.6 rebounds and 2.7 assists per game. He entered the 2019 NBA draft before withdrawing. On 19 October 2019, N'Doye scored a career-high 22 points in a win over SIG Strasbourg. He had another strong performance on 7 December, recording 16 points on perfect shooting, six rebounds, seven assists and a career-best six steals in a victory over Champagne Châlons-Reims. On 28 December, N'Doye was selected to play in the LNB All-Star Game. He finished the season averaging 10.1 points, 4.1 rebounds and four assists per game.

=== Monaco (2020–2021) ===
On 5 August 2020, N'Doye signed with AS Monaco of the Pro A.

=== BCM Gravelines-Dunkerque (2021–2022) ===
On September 29, 2021, he has signed with BCM Gravelines-Dunkerque of the LNB Pro A.

=== REG (2022) ===
In May 2022, N'Doye joined the Rwandan team REG to join them for the 2022 BAL Playoffs.

=== 3 Headed Monsters (2022–2025) ===
On May 25, 2022, Abdoulaye N'Doye was drafted (22nd overall) by the 3 Headed Monsters with the final pick of the 2022 BIG3 draft.

=== SIG Strasbourg (2025–present) ===
On September 22, 2025, he signed with SIG Strasbourg of the French LNB Élite.

== National team career ==
N'Doye won a gold medal with France at the 2014 FIBA Europe Under-16 Championship in Latvia, averaging 5.8 points, 3.4 rebounds and 2.3 assists per game. He won another gold medal with France at the 2016 FIBA U18 European Championship in Samsun, Turkey. N'Doye also competed in the 2017 FIBA Under-19 World Cup in Cairo and the 2018 FIBA U20 European Championship in Chemnitz, Germany, but his team failed to medal.

== Personal life ==
N'Doye's father, Oumar, played basketball professionally in France, and his mother is a doctor. He is the youngest of three siblings: he has a brother, Mansour, and a sister, Amina.
