= Tai Wynyard =

New Zealand basketball player

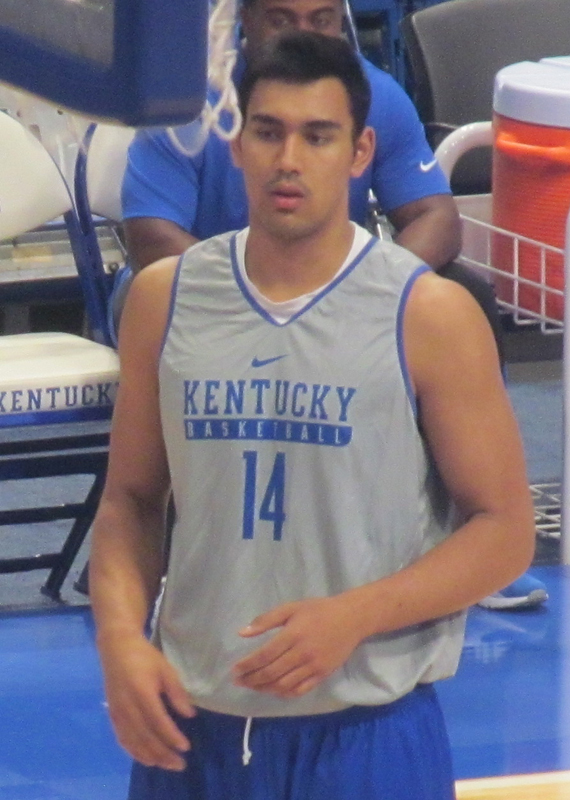
- Wynyard with the Kentucky Wildcats in 2016

Free agent
- Position: Power forward / center

Personal information
- Born: 5 February 1998 (age 28) Auckland, New Zealand
- Listed height: 6 ft 10 in (2.08 m)
- Listed weight: 255 lb (116 kg)

Career information
- High school: Rangitoto College (Auckland, New Zealand)
- College: Kentucky (2016–2018)
- Playing career: 2014–present

Career history
- 2014–2015: Super City Rangers
- 2014–2015: New Zealand Breakers
- 2019: Southland Sharks
- 2019–2020: Cairns Taipans
- 2020–2022: Taranaki Mountainairs / Airs
- 2023: Canterbury Rams
- 2024: Shanghai Sharks
- 2024–2025: New Zealand Breakers

Career highlights
- NBL champion (2015)

Tai Hikuroa Wynyard (born 5 February 1998) is a New Zealand professional basketball player who last played for the New Zealand Breakers of the Australian National Basketball League (NBL). He began his career playing in his home country for the Breakers of the Australian NBL and the Super City Rangers of the New Zealand NBL. After a two-year stint in the United States playing college basketball for Kentucky, Wynyard returned to the Australian and New Zealand NBL.

== Early life and career ==
Wynyard was born in Auckland, New Zealand, in the suburb of Henderson. He attended Rangitoto College and helped the school's basketball team win the Auckland premier championship in 2014. That year, he travelled to the United States to play in the Jordan Brand Classic. He also played in the New Zealand NBL in 2014 for the Super City Rangers, averaging 4.6 points and 2.4 rebounds in nine games.

On 15 August 2014, Wynyard signed with the New Zealand Breakers as a non-contracted development player so as to keep his amateur status and his NCAA eligibility. He appeared in two games during the 2014–15 NBL season and was a member of the Breakers' championship-winning squad.

On 26 January 2015, Wynyard committed to the University of Kentucky Wildcats basketball program with the aim of joining the team in 2016–17. In April 2015, he took part in the Nike Hoop Summit in Portland, Oregon.

With the Rangers in 2015, Wynyard averaged 6.2 points and 3.3 rebounds in 10 games.

In October 2015, Wynyard helped Rangitoto College win the Secondary Schools National Championships while earning MVP honours.

Wynyard returned to the Breakers as a development player for the 2015–16 NBL season, maintaining a non-payment contract status in order to continue protecting his amateur status. He appeared in five games over the first half of the season up until mid December.

== College career ==
In November 2015, Wynyard signed a National Letter of Intent to play college basketball for the Kentucky Wildcats. He joined the squad in December 2015 and redshirted the 2015–16 season in order to retain four full years of college eligibility.

In 2016–17, Wynyard logged a mere 34 minutes in Kentucky's first 20 games, while stuck behind fellow Wildcat big men Edrice Adebayo, Isaac Humphries and Sacha Killeya-Jones. He was used only sparingly by coach John Calipari throughout the entire season. In 15 games for the Wildcats as a freshman, Wynyard averaged 3.6 minutes per game and totalled 11 points and 13 rebounds.

In December of the 2017–18 season, Wynyard injured a disc in his back. Despite being sidelined with a possible season-ending injury, on 6 February 2018, Wynyard was suspended from the Kentucky basketball team due to a violation of team rules. It was reported that he attended a party with a person carrying a gun in January 2018. In early April, he left Kentucky and returned to New Zealand. Wynyard played just 97 minutes across two seasons with Kentucky, scoring 19 points.

In May 2018, Wynyard transferred to Santa Clara. He ultimately did not play for the Broncos after having to sit out the 2018–19 season due to NCAA regulations.

== Professional career ==
On 28 March 2019, Wynyard signed with the Southland Sharks for the 2019 New Zealand NBL season. In 19 games, he averaged 4.1 points and 3.2 rebounds per game.

In September 2019, Wynyard signed with the Cairns Taipans of the Australian NBL as a development player for the 2019–20 season. He made one appearance for the Taipans during the season.

In June 2020, Wynyard was acquired by the Taranaki Mountainairs for the 2020 New Zealand NBL season. In 15 games, he averaged 7.6 points and 4.1 rebounds per game.

On 6 March 2021, Wynyard re-signed with the Mountainairs for the 2021 New Zealand NBL season. In 17 games, he averaged 15.9 points, 6.4 rebounds and 1.2 assists per game.

On 7 January 2022, Wynyard re-signed with Taranaki, now known as the Airs, for the 2022 New Zealand NBL season. He entered the 2022 season having dropped nearly 15 kg following a big off-season training regime. In 13 games, he averaged 12.6 points, 8.2 rebounds, 1.5 assists, 1.2 steals and 1.1 blocks per game.

On 20 March 2023, Wynyard signed with the Canterbury Rams for the 2023 New Zealand NBL season. On 16 April 2023, he had 35 points and 14 rebounds in a 90–86 loss to the Manawatu Jets. In May 2023, he left the Rams to play in the CBA 3x3 Super League in China.

On 9 January 2024, Wynyard joined the Shanghai Sharks of the Chinese Basketball Association (CBA). He appeared in two games for the Sharks.

On 7 December 2024, Wynyard signed with the New Zealand Breakers as an injury replacement player, providing cover in the absence of Dane Pineau and Jonah Bolden. He played in four games during the 2024–25 NBL season.

== National team career ==
On 15 July 2014, Wynyard became the youngest Tall Black when he took to the court against South Korea in Wellington. He later missed out on making the final squad for the 2014 FIBA Basketball World Cup in Spain but went on to lead the Junior Tall Blacks in December during the Oceania Championships in Fiji.

After helping lead the Tall Blacks to the 2015 Stanković Cup title, Wynyard played in the two-game FIBA Oceania Championship series against Australia. New Zealand were defeated 2–0, with Wynyard seeing game time in the second game.

On 26 May 2017, Wynyard was named in a 12-man Junior Tall Blacks squad for the Under-19 World Cup in Cairo in July. He saw action in all seven contests during the tournament, averaging team highs of 14.3 points and 9.3 rebounds per game.

In April 2023, Wynyard helped New Zealand win bronze at the 3x3 FIBA Asia Cup and earned all-tournament team honours.

== Personal life ==
Wynyard is the son of world champion woodchoppers Jason and Karmyn Wynyard. His grandfather, Pae Wynyard, also won world titles in the sport, while his uncles compete as well. His mother also played college basketball for the Alaska Anchorage Seawolves from 1992 to 1995. His brother Tautoko joined him at the Canterbury Rams in 2023.

In October 2020, Wynyard and his partner Kelly had their first child.
