= September 2017 in sports =

<<	September 2017					>>
Su	Mo	Tu	We	Th	Fr	Sa
					1	2
3	4	5	6	7	8	9
10	11	12	13	14	15	16
17	18	19	20	21	22	23
24	25	26	27	28	29	30
Sports

This list shows notable sports-related events and notable outcomes that occurred in September of 2017.

== Events calendar ==
Date	Sport	Venue/Event	Status	Winner/s
1	Athletics	(Belgium) Memorial Van Damme (Diamond League #14)	International	United States
1–10	Baseball	(Canada) 2017 U-18 Baseball World Cup	International	United States
2–3	Rowing	(Poland) 2017 European Rowing U23 Championships	Continental	Romania
2–27	Chess	(Georgia (country)) Chess World Cup 2017	International	(Armenia) Levon Aronian
3	Formula One	(Italy) 2017 Italian Grand Prix	International	(United Kingdom) Lewis Hamilton ( (Germany) Mercedes)
3	Triathlon	(Czech Republic) 2017 ITU Triathlon World Cup #9	International	Men: (Norway) Gustav Iden; Women: (Australia) Gillian Backhouse
3–9	Water polo	(Greece) 2017 FINA World Women's Junior Water Polo Championships	International	Russia
4–9	Six-red snooker	(Thailand) 2017 Six-red World Championship	International	(Wales) Mark Williams
5–10	Mountain bike racing	(Australia) 2017 UCI Mountain Bike World Championships	International	Switzerland
5–10	Volleyball	(Japan) 2017 FIVB Volleyball Women's World Grand Champions Cup	International	China
7–10	Canoe marathon	(South Africa) 2017 ICF Canoe Marathon World Championships	International	Hungary
7–31 December	American football	(United States) 2017 NFL season (regular)	Domestic	AFC: (Massachusetts) New England Patriots; NFC: (Pennsylvania) Philadelphia Eagles
8–10	Ten-pin bowling	(England) 2017 Weber Cup	International	Team Europe
8–16	Basketball	(Tunisia) / (Senegal) AfroBasket 2017	Continental	Tunisia
9–10	Golf	(United States) 2017 Walker Cup	International	(United States) Team USA
10	Triathlon	(United States) 2017 Ironman 70.3 World Championship	International	Men: (Spain) Javier Gómez; Women: (Switzerland) Daniela Ryf
10	Motorcycle racing	2017 San Marino and Rimini's Coast motorcycle Grand Prix	International	MotoGP: (Spain) Marc Márquez ( (Japan) Repsol Honda Team); Moto2: (Switzerland) Dominique Aegerter ( (Germany) Kiefer Racing); Moto3: (Italy) Romano Fenati ( (Italy) Marinelli Rivacold; Snipers)
10–17	Volleyball	(Slovenia) 2017 FIVB Volleyball Women's U23 World Championship	International	Turkey
10–17	Badminton	(India) 2017 BWF World Senior Championships	International	England
10–23	Association football	(Thailand) 2017 AFC U-16 Women's Championship	Continental	North Korea
12–16	Snooker	(India) 2017 Indian Open	International	(Scotland) John Higgins
12–17	Volleyball	(Japan) 2017 FIVB Volleyball Men's World Grand Champions Cup	International	Brazil
13–17	Table tennis	(Luxembourg) 2017 European Table Tennis Championships	Continental	Men: Germany; Women: Romania
14–17	Golf	(France) 2017 Evian Championship	International	(Sweden) Anna Nordqvist
14–17	Triathlon	(Netherlands) 2017 ITU World Triathlon Series Grand Final	International	Men: (France) Vincent Luis; Women: (Bermuda) Flora Duffy
16–17	Darts	(Wales) 2017 Champions League of Darts	International	(Austria) Mensur Suljović
16–17	Rugby sevens	(Tunisia) 2017 Women's Africa Cup Sevens	Continental	South Africa
16–23	Indoor cricket	(United Arab Emirates) 2017 Indoor Cricket World Cup	International	Men: Australia; Women: Australia
16–23	Windsurfing	(Japan) 2017 RS:X World Championships	International	Men: (China) Ye Bing; Women: (China) Chen Peina
16–26	Chess	(Uruguay) 2017 World Youth Chess Championship	International	Men's U18: (Peru) Jose Eduardo Martinez Alcantara; Women's U18: (Slovenia) Laura Unuk; Boy's U16: (Russia) Andrey Esipenko; Girl's U16: (United States) Annie Wang
17	Formula One	2017 Singapore Grand Prix	International	(United Kingdom) Lewis Hamilton ( (Germany) Mercedes)
17–23	Multi-sport	(Malaysia) 2017 ASEAN Para Games	Regional	Indonesia
17–24	Road cycling	(Norway) 2017 UCI Road World Championships	International	Netherlands
17–27	Multi-sport	(Turkmenistan) 2017 Asian Indoor and Martial Arts Games	Continental	Turkmenistan
18–24	Snooker	(China) 2017 World Open	International	(China) Ding Junhui
18–27	Association football	(Bhutan) 2017 SAFF U-18 Championship	Regional	Nepal
22–1 October	Volleyball	(Azerbaijan) / (Georgia (country)) 2017 Women's European Volleyball Championship	Continental	Serbia
22–24	Tennis	(Czech Republic) 2017 Laver Cup	International	Team Europe
22–24	Aerobic gymnastics	(Italy) 2017 Aerobic Gymnastics European Championships	Continental	Russia
23–1 October	Canoe slalom	(France) 2017 ICF Canoe Slalom World Championships	International	Czech Republic
23–24	Triathlon	(Spain) 2017 ITU Triathlon World Cup #10	International	Men: (Germany) Justus Nieschlag; Women: (Czech Republic) Vendula Frintová
23–30	Weightlifting	(Kosovo) 2017 European Youth Weightlifting Championships	Continental	Romania
24	Basketball	(Spain) 2017 FIBA Intercontinental Cup	International	(Spain) Iberostar Tenerife
24	Motorcycle racing	2017 Aragon motorcycle Grand Prix	International	MotoGP: (Spain) Marc Márquez ( (Japan) Repsol Honda Team); Moto2: (Italy) Franco Morbidelli ( (Belgium) EG 0,0 Marc VDS); Moto3: (Spain) Joan Mir ( (Germany) Leopard Racing)
24	Athletics	(Germany) 2017 Berlin Marathon (WMM #4)	International	Men: (Kenya) Eliud Kipchoge; Women: (Kenya) Gladys Cherono
24–1 October	Rowing	(United States) 2017 World Rowing Championships	International	Italy
26–1 October	Volleyball	(United States) 2017 Men's NORCECA Volleyball Championship	Continental	United States
27–30	Basketball	(Papua New Guinea) 2017 FIBA Melanesia Basketball Cup (Papua New Guinea) 2017 FIBA Women's Melanesia Basketball Cup	International	Papua New Guinea; Papua New Guinea
27–21 October	Cricket	(Australia) 2017-18 JLT One-Day Cup	Domestic	Western Australia
28–1 October	Golf	(United States) 2017 Presidents Cup	International	United States
29–8 October	Multi-sport	(Chile) 2017 South American Youth Games	Continental	Brazil
30	Triathlon	(China) 2017 ITU Triathlon World Cup #11	International	Men: (Spain) Uxío Abuín Ares; Women: (Switzerland) Jolanda Annen
