= August 2017 in sports =

| << | August 2017 | | | | | >> |
| Su | Mo | Tu | We | Th | Fr | Sa |
| | | 1 | 2 | 3 | 4 | 5 |
| 6 | 7 | 8 | 9 | 10 | 11 | 12 |
| 13 | 14 | 15 | 16 | 17 | 18 | 19 |
| 20 | 21 | 22 | 23 | 24 | 25 | 26 |
| 27 | 28 | 29 | 30 | 31 |
Sports

This list shows notable sports-related events and notable outcomes that occurred in August of 2017.

== Events calendar ==
| Date | Sport | Venue/Event | Status | Winner/s |
|---|---|---|---|---|
| 1–5 | Squash | (England) 2017 World Doubles Squash Championships | International | Men: (Australia) Ryan Cuskelly & Cameron Pilley; Women: (New Zealand) Joelle King & Amanda Landers-Murphy; Mixed: (New Zealand) Paul Coll & Joelle King |
| 1–6 | Amateur wrestling | (Finland) 2017 World Junior Wrestling Championships | International | Men's Freestyle Juniors: Russia; Women's Freestyle Juniors: Japan; Greco-Roman Juniors: Iran |
| 1–7 | Athletics | (Switzerland) 2017 World Junior Para Athletics Championships | International | United States |
| 2–6 | Road bicycle racing | (Denmark) 2017 European Road Championships | Continental | Denmark |
| 2–6 | Rowing | (Lithuania) World Rowing Junior Championships 2017 | International | Romania |
| 3–6 | Golf | (Scotland) 2017 Women's British Open | International | (South Korea) In-Kyung Kim |
| 3–6 | Golf | (United States) 2017 WGC-Bridgestone Invitational | International | (Japan) Hideki Matsuyama |
| 4–12 | Basketball | (France) 2017 FIBA Europe Under-16 Championship for Women | Continental | France |
| 4–12 | Field hockey | (United States) 2017 Men's Pan American Cup | Continental | Argentina |
| 4–13 | Athletics | (United Kingdom) 2017 World Championships in Athletics | International | United States |
| 4–13 | Amateur boxing | (Italy) 2017 Women's European Amateur Boxing Championships | Continental | Turkey |
| 5–6 | Triathlon | (Canada) 2017 ITU World Triathlon Series #7 | International | Men: (Spain) Javier Gómez Noya; Women: (Australia) Ashleigh Gentle |
| 5–13 | Basketball | (Hungary) 2017 FIBA Europe Under-18 Championship for Women | Continental | Belgium |
| 5–13 | Field hockey | (United States) 2017 Women's Pan American Cup | Continental | Argentina |
| 5–19 | Australian football | (Australia) 2017 Australian Football International Cup | International | Men: Papua New Guinea; Women: Ireland |
| 6 | Motorcycle racing | 2017 Czech Republic motorcycle Grand Prix | International | MotoGP: (Spain) Marc Marquez ( (Japan) Repsol Honda Team); Moto2: (Switzerland) Thomas Lüthi ( (Germany) Kalex); Moto3: (Spain) Joan Mir ( (Germany) Leopard Racing) |
| 7–11 | Volleyball | (Chile) 2017 Men's South American Volleyball Championship | Continental | Brazil |
| 7–13 | Tennis | (Canada) 2017 Rogers Cup | International | Men: (Germany) Alexander Zverev Jr. Women: (Ukraine) Elina Svitolina |
| 7–13 | Basketball | (Argentina) 2017 FIBA Women's AmeriCup | Continental | Canada |
| 7–16 | Multi-sport | (United States) 2017 World Police and Fire Games | International | For results, click here. |
| 8 | Association football | (North Macedonia) 2017 UEFA Super Cup | Continental | (Spain) Real Madrid |
| 8–20 | Association football | (Northern Ireland) 2017 UEFA Women's Under-19 Championship | Continental | Spain |
| 8–20 | Handball | (Georgia (country)) 2017 Men's Youth World Handball Championship | International | France |
| 9–17 | Volleyball | (Philippines) 2017 Asian Women's Volleyball Championship | Continental | Japan |
| 9–26 | Rugby union | (Republic of Ireland) / (Northern Ireland) 2017 Women's Rugby World Cup | International | New Zealand |
| 10–13 | Golf | (United States) 2017 PGA Championship | International | (United States) Justin Thomas |
| 10–20 | Basketball | (Lebanon) 2017 FIBA Asia Cup | Continental | Australia |
| 12 | Triathlon | (Mexico) 2017 ITU Triathlon World Cup #8 | International | Men: (Mexico) Irving Pérez; Women: (United States) Summer Cook |
| 12–20 | Tennis | (United States) 2017 Cincinnati Masters | International | Men: (Bulgaria) Grigor Dimitrov; Women: (Spain) Garbiñe Muguruza |
| 13 | Motorcycle racing | (Austria) 2017 Austrian motorcycle Grand Prix | International | MotoGP: (Italy) Andrea Dovizioso ( (Italy) Ducati Corse); Moto2: (Italy) Franco Morbidelli ( (Belgium) EG 0,0 Marc VDS); Moto3: (Spain) Joan Mir ( (Germany) Leopard Racing) |
| 13 | 1:10 R/C off-road | (United States) 2017 ROAR 1:10 Electric Off-Road National Championship | Domestic | 4WD: (United States) Dakota Phend |
| 15–19 | Volleyball | (Colombia) 2017 Women's South American Volleyball Championship | Continental | Brazil |
| 16–20 | Beach volleyball | (Latvia) 2017 European Beach Volleyball Championships | Continental | Men: Italy (Daniele Lupo & Paolo Nicolai); Women: Germany (Nadja Glenzke & Julia Großner) |
| 17–20 | Eventing | (Poland) 2017 European Eventing Championships | Continental | (Germany) Ingrid Klimke (with horse Horseware Hale Bob OLD) |
| 17–20 | Rallying | (Germany) 2017 Rallye Deutschland (WRC #10) | International | (Estonia) Ott Tänak & Martin Järveoja ( (United Kingdom) M-Sport) |
| 18–20 | Golf | (United States) 2017 Solheim Cup | International | Team USA |
| 18–20 | Canoe slalom | (Germany) 2017 European Junior and U23 Canoe Slalom Championships | Continental | Czech Republic |
| 18–25 | Volleyball | (Egypt) 2017 FIVB Volleyball Men's U23 World Championship | International | Argentina |
| 18–27 | Basketball | (Mali) AfroBasket Women 2017 | Continental | Nigeria |
| 18–27 | Volleyball | (Bahrain) 2017 FIVB Volleyball Boys' U19 World Championship | International | Iran |
| 18–27 | Triathlon | (Canada) 2017 ITU Multisport World Championships | International | Men's aquathlon: (Canada) Matthew Sharpe; Women's aquathlon: (United Kingdom) Emma Pallant; Men's cross triathlon: (Mexico) Francisco Serrano; Women's cross triathlon: (Canada) Melanie McQuaid; Men's duathlon: (France) Benoit Nicolas; Women's duathlon: (Australia) Felicity Sheedy-Ryan; Men's long distance: (Canada) Lionel Sanders; Women's long distance: (Australia) Sarah Crowley |
| 19–27 | Field hockey | (Netherlands) 2017 Men's EuroHockey Nations Championship (Netherlands) 2017 Women's EuroHockey Nations Championship | Continental | Men: Netherlands; Women: Netherlands |
| 19–30 | Multi-sport | (Taiwan) 2017 Summer Universiade | International | Japan |
| 19–31 | Multi-sport | (Malaysia) 2017 Southeast Asian Games | Regional | Malaysia |
| 19–10 September | Road bicycle racing | (Spain) 2017 Vuelta a España | International | (United Kingdom) Chris Froome ( (United Kingdom) Team Sky) |
| 19–7 October | Rugby union | (Argentina) / (Australia) / (New Zealand) / (South Africa) 2017 Rugby Championship | International | New Zealand |
| 20 | Athletics | (United Kingdom) British Grand Prix (Diamond League #12) | International | Great Britain |
| 21–26 | Karate | (Argentina) 2017 Pan American U21, Junior, and Cadet Karate Championships | Continental | Brazil |
| 21–26 | Amateur wrestling | (France) 2017 World Wrestling Championships | International | Men's Freestyle: United States; Women's Freestyle: Japan; Greco-Roman: Russia |
| 21–27 | Badminton | (Scotland) 2017 BWF World Championships | International | Men's Singles: (Denmark) Viktor Axelsen; Women's Singles: (Japan) Nozomi Okuhara; Men's Doubles: China (Liu Cheng & Zhang Nan); Women's Doubles: China (Chen Qingchen & Jia Yifan); Mixed: Indonesia (Tontowi Ahmad & Liliyana Natsir) |
| 21–29 | Modern pentathlon | (Egypt) 2017 World Modern Pentathlon Championships | International | Men: (South Korea) Jung Jin-hwa; Women: (Russia) Gulnaz Gubaydullina |
| 22–27 | Beach volleyball | (Germany) 2017 FIVB Beach Volleyball World Tour Finals | International | Men: United States (Phil Dalhausser & Nick Lucena); Women: Germany (Laura Ludwig & Kira Walkenhorst) |
| 23–27 | Canoe sprint | (Czech Republic) 2017 ICF Canoe Sprint World Championships | International | Germany |
| 23–27 | Track cycling | (Italy) 2017 UCI Junior Track Cycling World Championships | International | Russia |
| 23–28 | Aquatics | (United States) 2017 FINA World Junior Swimming Championships | International | United States |
| 24 | Athletics | (Switzerland) Weltklasse Zürich (Diamond League #13) | International | Czech Republic |
| 24–3 September | Volleyball | (Poland) 2017 Men's European Volleyball Championship | Continental | Russia |
| 25–28 | Handball | (Qatar) 2017 IHF Super Globe | International | (Spain) Barcelona |
| 25–2 September | Boxing | (Germany) 2017 AIBA World Boxing Championships | International | Cuba |
| 25–3 September | Basketball | (Argentina) / (Colombia) / (Uruguay) 2017 FIBA AmeriCup | Continental | United States |
| 26 | Boxing | (United States) Floyd Mayweather Jr. vs. Conor McGregor | International | (United States) Floyd Mayweather Jr. |
| 26–27 | Triathlon | (Sweden) 2017 ITU World Triathlon Series #8 | International | Men: (United Kingdom) Jonny Brownlee; Women: (Bermuda) Flora Duffy |
| 26–10 September | Roller sport | (China) 2017 World Roller Games | International | Colombia |
| 26–9 December | American football | (United States) 2017 NCAA Division I FBS football season | Domestic | AAC: UCF Knights; ACC: (South Carolina) Clemson Tigers; B1G: Ohio State Buckeyes; B12: Oklahoma Sooners; CUSA: Florida Atlantic Owls; MAC: Toledo Rockets; MW: (Idaho) Boise State Broncos; PAC-12: (California) USC Trojans; SEC: (Georgia (U.S. state)) Georgia Bulldogs |
| 27 | Formula One | (Belgium) 2017 Belgian Grand Prix | International | (United Kingdom) Lewis Hamilton ( (Germany) Mercedes) |
| 27 | Motorcycle racing | (United Kingdom) 2017 British motorcycle Grand Prix | International | MotoGP: (Italy) Andrea Dovizioso ( (Italy) Ducati Corse); Moto2: (Japan) Takaaki Nakagami ( (Japan) Idemitsu Honda Team Asia); Moto3: (Spain) Arón Canet ( (Spain) Estrella Galicia 0,0) |
| 28–3 September | Field hockey | (Spain) 2017 EuroHockey Nations Junior Championships for Men and Women | Continental | Men: Netherlands; Women: Netherlands |
| 28–3 September | Judo | (Hungary) 2017 World Judo Championships | International | Japan |
| 28–10 September | Tennis | (United States) 2017 US Open (Grand Slam #4) | International | Men: (Spain) Rafael Nadal; Women: (United States) Sloane Stephens |
| 29–3 September | Rhythmic gymnastics | (Italy) 2017 World Rhythmic Gymnastics Championships | International | Russia |
| 29–10 September | Rugby union | (Uruguay) 2017 World Rugby Under 20 Trophy | International | Japan |
| 30–10 September | Sport climbing | (Austria) 2017 IFSC World Youth Climbing Championship | International | Japan |
| 30–11 September | Shooting | (Russia) 2017 World Shotgun Championships | International | Italy |
| 31–3 September | Road cycling | (South Africa) 2017 UCI Para-cycling Road World Championships | International | Germany |
| 31–17 September | Basketball | (Finland) / (Israel) / (Romania) / (Turkey) EuroBasket 2017 | Continental | Slovenia |
