= PalaLivorno =

Indoor sporting arena in Livorno, Italy

Coordinates: 43°33′18.62″N 10°20′31.22″E

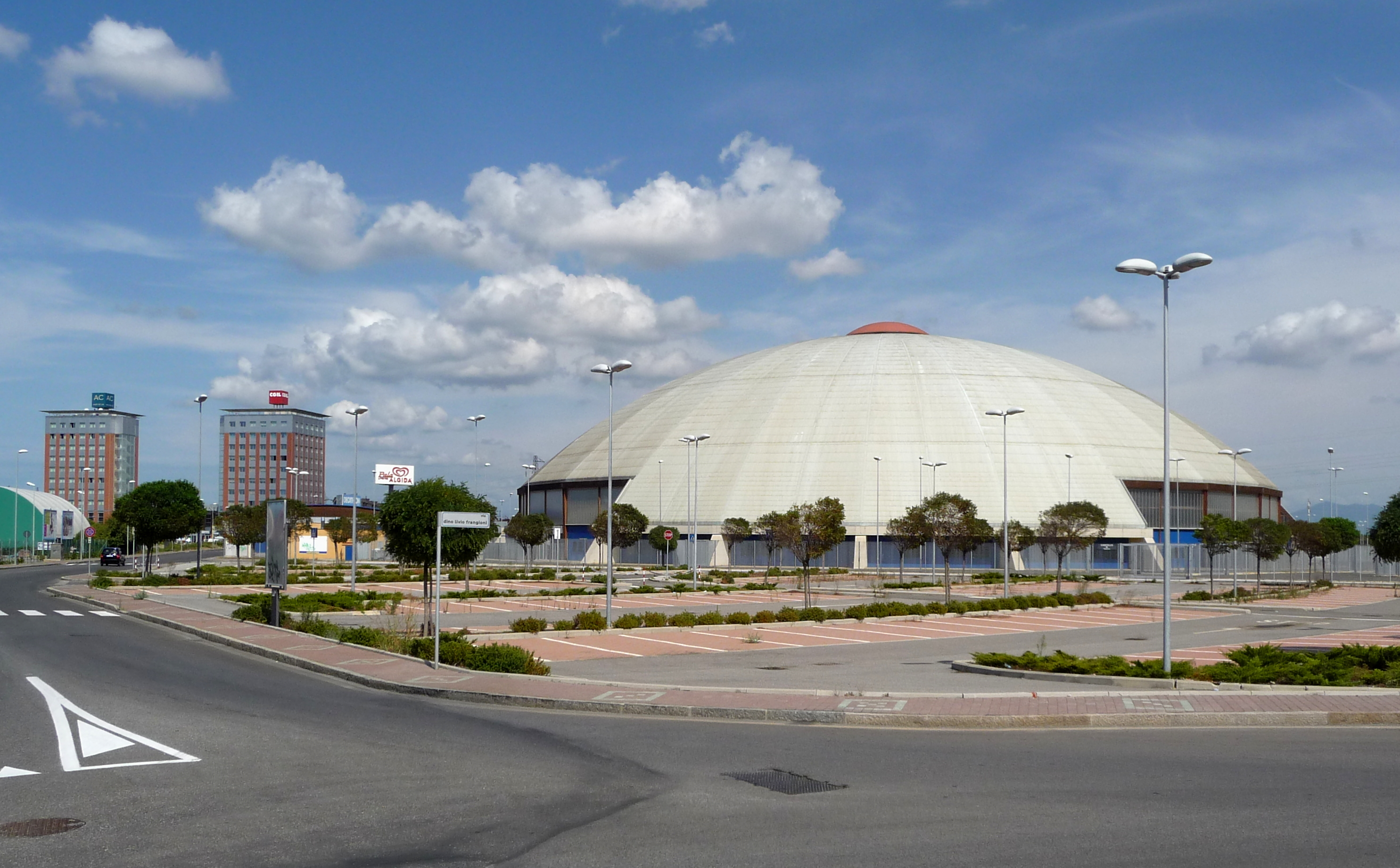
PalaLivorno

PalaLivorno (formerly known as PalaAlgida), from 2013 known as Modigliani Forum, is an indoor sporting arena located in Livorno, Italy. The capacity of the arena is 8,033 people and was opened in 2004. It is currently home of the Libertas Livorno 1947 basketball team.

The arena was renamed in 2013 from PalaLivorno to Modigliani Forum in honor of painter Amedeo Modigliani. There was an online and newspaper poll organized by PalaLivorno S.c.r.l., the operators of the PalaLivorno. Eleven names were originally submitted, with two names making it to a final, Amedeo Modigliani and Antonio Gramsci. Modigliani received 3,179 votes while Gramsci received 1,927. The press room was named in honor of Gramsci.
