= Eric Vila =

Spanish basketball player

- Vila with Manresa in 2026

No. 4 – Bàsquet Manresa
- Position: Power forward
- League: Liga ACB; EuroCup

Personal information
- Born: 15 May 1998 (age 28) Bescanó, Spain
- Listed height: 6 ft 11 in (2.11 m)
- Listed weight: 221 lb (100 kg)

Career information
- College: Texas A&M (2016–2017); Northwest Florida State (2018–2019); UTEP (2019–2020)
- NBA draft: 2021: undrafted
- Playing career: 2014–present

Career history
- 2014–2016: FC Barcelona
- 2014–2016: →FC Barcelona B
- 2021–2024: Girona
- 2024–2025: Río Breogán
- 2025–2026: Gran Canaria
- 2026–present: Manresa
Medals
Men's basketball
Representing Spain
FIBA U16 European Championship
Bronze medal – third place	2014 France	Team

Eric Martínez Vila (born 15 May 1998) is a Spanish basketball player for Bàsquet Manresa of the Spanish Liga ACB and the EuroCup. He has also represented the Spanish national team internationally. Standing at 2.11 m (6 ft 11 in), Vila plays as a power forward.

== Early life and youth career ==
A native of Bescanó (Girona), he played for FC Barcelona at the youth level since he was 12 years old. Vila received regular playing time for the reserve team, FC Barcelona B. In December 2014, at age 16, he became the youngest player in club history to play in the Liga ACB.

== College career ==
Vila started playing college basketball in the United States with Texas A&M. After one season, he transferred to Fresno State, sitting out his following year, but did not play for the team. Vila played for Northwest Florida State College in 2018–19 before moving to UTEP as a redshirt junior. He averaged 3.0 points and 5.0 rebounds per game.

== Professional career ==
On 17 July 2021, Vila signed with Bàsquet Girona of the LEB Oro. Vila continued to play with Girona as the team achieved promotion to the Liga ACB and played in the first tier of Spanish basketball from the 2022-23 season. He extended his contract with Girona for a further season in July 2023. He would leave Girona in June 2024, after three seasons with the Catalans.

In June 2024, Vila signed with Río Breogán of the Liga ACB. Vila became an important player in Breogán's roster, playing in all 34 regular season games and recording his best numbers (21 points) in a win against Unicaja Málaga.

On July 17, 2025, Vila signed a two season contract with CB Gran Canaria of the Liga ACB. In June 2026, Gran Canaria announced Vila had activated his contract's release clause and would therefore leave the club.

On June 25, 2026, Vila signed a two-season contract with Bàsquet Manresa of the Liga ACB.

== National team career ==
Vila has represented Spain in several international tournaments. In 2014, he helped his team win a bronze medal at the FIBA Europe Under-16 Championship in Latvia. In the 2017 FIBA Under-19 World Cup in Cairo, Vila averaged 13 points, 10.9 rebounds and 2.7 assists per game. At the quarterfinals of the tournament, he recorded 24 points, 11 rebounds and three assists in a 70–58 win over Argentina.

In February 2025, Vila was called up by the senior Spanish national team to play in EuroBasket 2025 qualification games.

Vila has also represented the Catalan national team in exhibition games.
