= December 2017 in sports =

<<	December 2017					>>
Su	Mo	Tu	We	Th	Fr	Sa
					1	2
3	4	5	6	7	8	9
10	11	12	13	14	15	16
17	18	19	20	21	22	23
24	25	26	27	28	29	30
31
Sports

This list shows notable sports-related events and notable outcomes that occurred in December of 2017.

Date	Sport	Venue/Event	Status	Winner/s	Ref.
1–2	Rugby sevens	(United Arab Emirates) 2017 Dubai Sevens (WRSS #1)	International	South Africa	
1–9	Floorball	(Slovakia) 2017 Women's World Floorball Championships	International	Sweden	
1–10	Field hockey	(India) 2016–17 Men's FIH Hockey World League Final	International	Australia	
1–17	Handball	(Germany) 2017 World Women's Handball Championship	International	France	
2–3	Formula E	2017 Hong Kong ePrix (FE #1 & #2)	International	Race 1: (United Kingdom) Sam Bird ( (United Kingdom) DS Virgin Racing); Race 2: (Sweden) Felix Rosenqvist ( (Italy) Mahindra Racing)	
2–3	Taekwondo	(Ivory Coast) 2017 World Taekwondo Grand Prix Final	International	South Korea	
3–17	Association football	(Kenya) 2017 CECAFA Cup	Regional	Kenya	
3–17	Multi-sport	(Nicaragua) 2017 Central American Games	Regional	Guatemala	
4–7	Pool	(United States) 2017 Mosconi Cup	International	Europe	
4–15	Multi-sport	(Vanuatu) 2017 Pacific Mini Games	Regional	(France) /New Caledonia	
5–6	Taekwondo	(Ivory Coast) 2017 World Taekwondo Team Championships	International	Men: Iran; Women: China; Mixed: China	
6–13	Association football	(Argentina) / (Brazil) 2017 Copa Sudamericana Finals	Continental	(Argentina) Independiente	
6–16	Association football	(United Arab Emirates) 2017 FIFA Club World Cup	International	(Spain) Real Madrid	
7–10	Figure skating	(Japan) 2017–18 Grand Prix of Figure Skating Final	International	Men: (United States) Nathan Chen; Ladies: (Russia) Alina Zagitova; Pairs: Germany (Aliona Savchenko & Bruno Massot); Ice dance: France (Gabriella Papadakis & Guillaume Cizeron)	
8–16	Association football	(Japan) 2017 EAFF E-1 Football Championship (Japan) 2017 EAFF E-1 Women's Football Championship	Regional	Men: South Korea; Women: North Korea	
8–17	Squash	(England) 2017 PSA Men's World Championship (England) 2017 PSA Women's World Championship	International	Men: (Egypt) Mohamed El Shorbagy; Women: (Egypt) Raneem El Weleily	
9–10	Rugby sevens	2017 South Africa Sevens (WRSS #2)	International	New Zealand	
9–15	Ice hockey	(Slovenia) 2018 World Junior Ice Hockey Championships Division I – Group B	International	Norway was promoted to Division I – Group A Lithuania was relegated to Division II – Group A	
9–16	Sailing	(China) 2017 Youth Sailing World Championships	International	Medal Table: United States; Nations' Trophy: Italy	
10	Athletics	(Slovakia) 2017 European Cross Country Championships	Continental	Great Britain	
10	Horse racing	2017 Hong Kong Cup	International	Horse: (United Kingdom) Time Warp; Jockey: (Australia) Zac Purton; Trainer: (Hong Kong) Anthony S. Cruz	
10–14	Multi-sport	(United Arab Emirates) 2017 Asian Youth Para Games	Continental	Japan	
10–16	Ice hockey	(United Kingdom) 2018 World Junior Ice Hockey Championships Division II – Group A	International	Japan was promoted to Division I – Group B Netherlands was relegated to Division II – Group B	
10–16	Ice hockey	(France) 2018 World Junior Ice Hockey Championships Division I – Group A	International	Kazakhstan was promoted to Top Division; Hungary was relegated to Division I – Group B	
12–17	Volleyball	(Poland) 2017 FIVB Volleyball Men's Club World Championship	International	(Russia) VC Zenit-Kazan	
13–17	Ice hockey	(Czech Republic) / (Russia) 2017 Channel One Cup	International	Russia	
13–17	Badminton	(United Arab Emirates) 2017 BWF Super Series Finals	International	Men: (Denmark) Viktor Axelsen; Women: (Japan) Akane Yamaguchi	
13–17	Swimming	(Denmark) 2017 European Short Course Swimming Championships	Continental	Russia	
14–17	Table tennis	(Kazakhstan) 2017 ITTF World Tour Grand Finals	International	Men: (China) Fan Zhendong; Women: (China) Chen Meng	
16	Ice hockey	(Canada) NHL 100 Classic	Domestic	(Ontario) Ottawa Senators	
22–5 January 2018	Association football	(Kuwait) 23rd Arabian Gulf Cup	Regional	Oman	
26–5 January 2018	Ice hockey	(United States) 2018 World Junior Ice Hockey Championships	International	Canada	
30–6 January 2018	Ski jumping	(Germany) / (Austria) 2017–18 Four Hills Tournament	International	(Poland) Kamil Stoch	
30–7 January 2018	Cross-country skiing	(Switzerland) / (Germany) / (Italy) 2017–18 Tour de Ski	International	Men: (Switzerland) Dario Cologna; Women: (Norway) Heidi Weng	
