= Ferdinand Zylka =

German basketball player (born 1998)

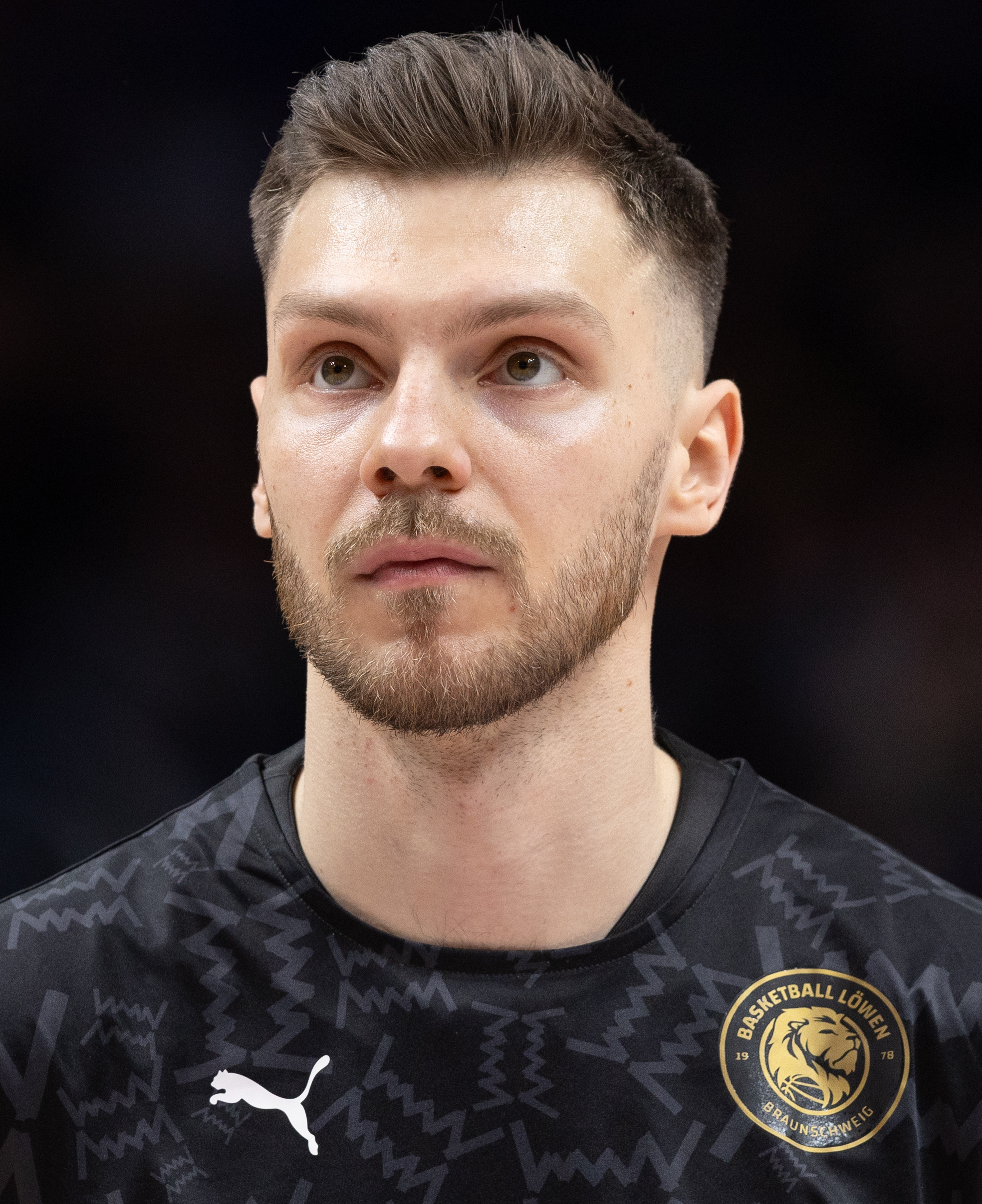
- Zylka with Basketball Löwen Braunschweig in 2025

No. 6 – Löwen Braunschweig
- Position: Shooting guard
- League: Basketball Bundesliga

Personal information
- Born: 11 April 1998 (age 28) Berlin, Germany
- Listed height: 1.91 m (6 ft 3 in)
- Listed weight: 198 lb (90 kg)

Career information
- Playing career: 2021–present

Career history
- 2013–2018: Alba Berlin
- 2016–2018: →SSV Lokomotive Bernau
- 2018: Rockets
- 2018–2020: Mitteldeutscher BC
- 2018–2020: →BSW Sixers
- 2020–2021: Gießen 46ers
- 2021–2022: PS Karlsruhe Lions
- 2022–2023: Circus Brussels
- 2023–2024: Antwerp Giants
- 2024–present: Löwen Braunschweig

Ferdinand Leontin Zylka (born 11 April 1998) is a German basketball player for Löwen Braunschweig of the Basketball Bundesliga.

== Professional career ==
In August 2021, Zylka signed with PS Karlsruhe Lions. The Lions stated that Zylka was their "king transfer" and expected him to be their leading player.

On June 20, 2022, Zylka signed with Circus Brussels of the BNXT League.

On March 15, 2023, Zylka signed with Antwerp Giants.

== Player profile ==
Zylka plays the shooting guard position. In August 2021, Lions' head coach Aleksandar Scepanovic stated that he values Zylka's ability especially as a three-point scorer and defender.
