= Lorenzo Penna =

Italian basketball player (born 1998)

No. 24 – Libertas Livorno
- Position: Point guard
- League: Serie A2

Personal information
- Born: January 21, 1998 (age 28) Bentivoglio, Emilia-Romagna, Italy
- Listed height: 1.81 m (5 ft 11 in)
- Listed weight: 78 kg (172 lb)

Career information
- Playing career: 2015–present

Career history
- 2015–2018: Virtus Bologna
- 2017–2018: →Andrea Costa Imola
- 2018–2020: APU Udine
- 2020–2021: Basket Torino
- 2021–2025: Scaligera Basket Verona
- 2022–2023: →Pallacanestro Forlì
- 2025–present: Libertas Livorno

Career highlights
- Italian LNP Cup champion (2017); Serie A2 League champion (2017)
Medals
Men's basketball
Representing Italy
FIBA Under-19 World Cup
Silver medal – second place	2017 Egypt	U-19 National Team
FIBA Europe Under-18 Championship
Bronze medal – third place	2016 Turkey	U-18 National Team

Lorenzo Penna (born January 21, 1998) is an Italian professional basketball player for Libertas Livorno of the Italian Serie A2.
