= Jesús Cruz =

Mexican baseball player (born 1995)

Saraperos de Saltillo – No. 49
- Pitcher
- Born: April 15, 1995 (age 31); Salinas de Hidalgo, San Luis Potosí, Mexico
- Bats: Right Throws: Right

MLB debut
- August 18, 2020, for the St. Louis Cardinals

MLB statistics (through 2022 season)
- Win–loss record: 0–0
- Earned run average: 7.45
- Strikeouts: 8
- Stats at Baseball Reference

Teams
- St. Louis Cardinals (2020); Atlanta Braves (2022)
Medals
Men's baseball
Representing Mexico
World Baseball Classic
Bronze medal – third place	2023 Miami	Team
Pan American Games
Bronze medal – third place	2023 Santiago	Team

Jesús Cruz (born April 15, 1995) is a Mexican professional baseball pitcher for the Saraperos de Saltillo of the Mexican League. He has previously played in Major League Baseball (MLB) for the St. Louis Cardinals and Atlanta Braves.

== Career ==
=== Sultanes de Monterrey ===
Cruz began his professional career by signing with the Sultanes de Monterrey of the Mexican League on March 30, 2017. Cruz struggled to an 8.49 ERA in 13 appearances for Monterrey before he was released on July 1.

=== St. Louis Cardinals ===
On July 2, 2017, Cruz signed a minor league contract with the St. Louis Cardinals organization. He finished the 2017 season splitting time between three Cardinals affiliates; the Dominican Summer League Cardinals, the rookie-level Gulf Coast League Cardinals, and the Low-A State College Spikes. With the three clubs, Cruz worked to a 1.42 ERA with 30 strikeouts in 19.0 innings pitched across 15 combined appearances. In 2018, Cruz split the season between the Single-A Peoria Chiefs and the High-A Palm Beach Cardinals, pitching to a 7–1 record and 3.27 ERA with 104 strikeouts in 30 total games. He spent the 2019 season split between the Double-A Springfield Cardinals and the Triple-A Memphis Redbirds, but struggled overall to the tune of a 6.02 ERA with 89 strikeouts, a 13.1 K/9 and 6.8 BB/9 in 52 contests between the two affiliates. Cruz did not play in a minor league game in 2020 due to the cancellation of the minor league season because of the COVID-19 pandemic.

Cruz was selected to the 40-man roster and promoted to the major leagues for the first time on August 18, 2020 and made his MLB debut that night, allowing two earned runs in an inning of relief against the Chicago Cubs. He was optioned down to the alternate training site following the appearance. On September 1, Cruz was designated for assignment by the Cardinals after Ryan Helsley was activated off of the COVID list. Cruz spent the 2021 season with Triple-A Memphis, posting a 3.06 ERA with 38 strikeouts across 37 appearances. In the offseason, Cruz played with the Águilas de Mexicali of the Mexican Pacific League. On March 30, 2022, Cruz was released by the Cardinals organization.

=== Atlanta Braves ===
On April 6, 2022, Cruz signed a minor league deal with the Atlanta Braves. He was assigned to the Triple-A Gwinnett Stripers to begin the year. Cruz was recalled to the major leagues on May 29. He pitched in 7 games, allowing 6 runs in 8 2/3 innings, before being sent back to Gwinnett on June 20. He was outrighted off the roster on August 6. On October 14, Cruz elected to become a free agent.

=== Philadelphia Phillies ===
On January 24, 2023, Cruz signed a minor league contract with the Philadelphia Phillies. In 28 games for the Triple-A Lehigh Valley IronPigs, he posted a 5.40 ERA with 39 strikeouts in 35 innings of work. The Phillies released Cruz on July 25.

=== Leones de Yucatán ===
On July 27, 2023, Cruz signed with the Leones de Yucatán of the Mexican League. In four outings for Yucatán, he did not concede a run, striking out six in four innings pitched.

In 2024, Cruz made 39 appearances for Yucatán, he logged a 1–2 record and 5.70 ERA with 50 strikeouts and 7 saves across 36 1/3 innings pitched.

=== Los Angeles Angels ===
On February 13, 2025, Cruz was traded to the Saraperos de Saltillo. However, on February 28, Cruz signed a minor league contract with the Los Angeles Angels. In 11 appearances (five starts) for the Double-A Rocket City Trash Pandas, he posted an 0-1 record and 4.15 ERA with 23 strikeouts over 26 innings of work. Cruz was released by the Angels organization on June 29.

=== Saraperos de Saltillo ===
On July 1, 2025, Cruz signed with the Saraperos de Saltillo of the Mexican League. In 20 games 19.2 innings of relief he went 2-0 with a 5.49 ERA and 23 strikeouts.

== International career ==
Cruz has pitched for the Mexican national team in several international tournaments. He pitched in three games in the 2023 World Baseball Classic, pickup up the loss in the 10th inning against Colombia after Luis Urías committed an error at shortstop.

He was part of the squad that won the bronze medal at the 2023 Pan American Games contested in Santiago, Chile in October 2023. He also pitched in the 2019 and 2024 WBSC Premier12 tournaments. In 2024, he earned the win against the Netherlands but took the loss against Panama after allowing an unearned run to score.
