= Oleggio Magic Basket =

Sports team in Italy

- Leagues: Serie B Basket
- Founded: 1973; 52 years ago
- Arena: PalAmico
- Capacity: 2,600
- Location: Oleggio, Italy
- 2018 position: Serie B, 12th of 18 (North)
- Website: Link
Home

Oleggio Magic Basket is a basketball team in Oleggio, Italy. Currently, the team baskets in the Serie B Basket, the third tier competition in basket. Founded in 1973 as AS Oleggio Basket, the club has played in the lower Italian regions for years.
