= 2020–21 Rink Hockey European Female League =

Tournament details
- Host country: Spain
- City: Palau-solità i Plegamans
- Dates: 27 May 2021– 30 May 2021
- Teams: 8 (from 2 associations)
- Venue(s): 1 (in 1 host city)

Final positions
- Champions: (Spain) Palau de Plegamans (1st title)
- Runners-up: (Spain) Voltregà

Tournament statistics
- Matches played: 7
- Goals scored: 53 (7.57 per match)
- Attendance: 0 (0 per match)
- Top scorer(s): (Spain) Aina Florenza (6 goals)
- Best player(s): (Spain) Laura Puigdueta
- Best goalkeeper: (Spain) Laura Vicente

The 2020–21 Rink Hockey European Female League is the 14th season of Europe's female club roller hockey tournament organised by World Skate Europe – Rink Hockey, and the 3rd season since it was renamed from CERH Women's European League to Rink Hockey European Female League.

== Teams ==
Each national federation could enter up to four teams; however, an additional invitation was sent to Spanish side Gijón Solimar, as they entered all previous editions of the competitions but failed to qualify after the season was shortened due to the COVID-19 pandemic.

Originally, a total of 14 teams from 4 associations was registered to enter the Rink Hockey European Female League. The 2018–19 edition finalists would enter the group phase, while the other teams would play a preliminary phase.

Original qualified teams for 2020–21 Rink Hockey European Female League
Entry round	Teams			
GP	(Spain) Voltregà	(Spain) Palau de Plegamans		
PP	(Spain) Manlleu	(Spain) Cerdanyola	(Spain) Gijón Solimar	(France) Coutras
PP	(France) Mérignac	(France) Noisy-le-Grand	(France) Vendée	(Portugal) Benfica
PP	(Portugal) Massamá	(Portugal) CACO	(Germany) Remscheid	(Germany) Walsum

On 18 October 2020, the World Skate Europe-Rink Hockey Committee decided to postpone two preliminary phase matches due to travel restrictions imposed by the COVID-19 pandemic in Europe. Later that month, on 29 October, it was announced that all WSERHC international competitions would be suspended until the end of the year.

On 17 January 2021, an updated list of clubs interested in participating under new conditions was published, with all but the eight teams from two associations withdrawing from the competition. A new format was established for the 8 teams, consisting of a final eight played at a single venue over one-legged matches.

Qualified teams for 2020–21 Rink Hockey European Female League
Entry round	Teams			
QF	(Spain) Manlleu	(Spain) Palau de Plegamans	(Spain) Cerdanyola	(Spain) Voltregà
QF	(Spain) Gijón Solimar	(Portugal) Benfica	(Portugal) Massamá	(Portugal) CACO

== Final eight ==
The final eight was hosted by Palau de Plegamans, taking place at Pavelló Municipal Maria Víctor in Palau-solità i Plegamans, Spain from 27 to 30 May 2021.

=== Draw ===
The draw of the final eight was held 28 February 2021, 17:00 WET (UTC) at the Portuguese Roller Sports Federation headquarters in Lisbon. The eight teams were drawn without any restrictions.

=== Bracket ===
Quarter-finals
27 May 2021
(Spain) Gijón Solimar	7
(Portugal) CACO	2
27 May 2021
(Portugal) Massamá	2
(Spain) Palau de Plegamans	9
27 May 2021
(Portugal) Benfica	2
(Spain) Voltregà	3
27 May 2021
(Spain) Cerdanyola	4
(Spain) Manlleu (a.e.t.)	7

Semi-finals
29 May 2021
(Spain) Gijón Solimar	3
(Spain) Palau de Plegamans	4
29 May 2021
(Spain) Voltregà	2
(Spain) Manlleu	1

Final
30 May 2021
(Spain) Palau de Plegamans	6
(Spain) Voltregà	1

=== Quarter-finals ===
27 May 2021
14:00

Gijón Solimar (Spain)	7–2	(Portugal) CACO
	Report

Pavelló Municipal Maria Víctor, Palau-solità i Plegamans
Attendance: 0
Referee: Silvia Coelho (Portugal), Tania Pardo (Spain)

27 May 2021
16:00

Cerdanyola (Spain)	4–7 (a.e.t.)	(Spain) Manlleu
	Report

Pavelló Municipal Maria Víctor, Palau-solità i Plegamans
Attendance: 0
Referee: David Ballares (Spain), Pedro Silva (Portugal)

27 May 2021
18:00

Benfica (Portugal)	2–3	(Spain) Voltregà
	Report

Pavelló Municipal Maria Víctor, Palau-solità i Plegamans
Attendance: 0
Referee: Carlos Correia (Portugal), Oriol Claramunt (Spain)

27 May 2021
20:00

Massamá (Portugal)	2–9	(Spain) Palau de Plegamans
	Report

Pavelló Municipal Maria Víctor, Palau-solità i Plegamans
Attendance: 0
Referee: Tania Pardo (Spain), Silvia Coelho (Portugal)

=== Semi-finals ===
27 May 2021
15:00

Voltregà (Spain)	2–1	(Spain) Manlleu
	Report

Pavelló Municipal Maria Víctor, Palau-solità i Plegamans
Attendance: 0
Referee: Tania Pardo (Spain), Pedro Silva (Portugal)

27 May 2021
17:30

Gijón Solimar (Spain)	3–4	(Spain) Palau de Plegamans
	Report

Pavelló Municipal Maria Víctor, Palau-solità i Plegamans
Attendance: 0
Referee: Carlos Correia (Portugal), David Campos (Spain)

=== Final ===
27 May 2021
12:00

Palau de Plegamans (Spain)	6–1	(Spain) Voltregà
	Report

Pavelló Municipal Maria Víctor, Palau-solità i Plegamans
Attendance: 0
Referee: Silvia Coelho (Portugal), Tania Pardo (Spain)

== See also ==
- 2020–21 Rink Hockey Euroleague
- 2020–21 World Skate Europe Cup
