= 2019–20 Rink Hockey European Female League =

Tournament details
- Dates: 26 October 2019 - 5 April 2020
- Teams: 8 (from 3 associations)

The 2019–20 Rink Hockey European Female League was the 13th season of Europe's premier female club roller hockey competition organized by CERH. The competition was cancelled during the season due to COVID-19 pandemic.

== Format ==
Eight teams joined the competition that changed its format and recovered the group stage. The two first qualified teams from each group qualified to the Final Four.

== Teams ==
Eight teams from three federations joined the competition.

Participating teams
(Spain) Voltregà (TH)	(France) Mérignac (1st)
(Spain) Palau de Plegamans (1st)	(France) Noisy le Grand (2nd)
(Spain) Manlleu (2nd)	(France) Coutras (3rd)
(Spain) Gijón (3rd)	(Portugal) Benfica (1st)

== Group stage ==
The 8 teams were allocated into two pots, according to geographical criteria.

In each group, teams played against each other home-and-away in a home-and-away round-robin format.

Only three national associations were represented in the group stage.

=== Group A ===
Pos	Team	Pld	W	D	L	GF	GA	GD	Pts	Qualification	MAN	BEN	VOL	NOI
1	(Spain) Manlleu	6	5	1	0	36	7	+29	16	Advance to the Final Four	—	4–1	5–3	15–0
2	(Portugal) Benfica	6	3	1	2	45	12	+33	10	Advance to the Final Four	3–4	—	5–1	17–0
3	(Spain) Voltregà	6	2	2	2	34	12	+22	8		0–0	2–2	—	15–0
4	(France) Noisy le Grand	6	0	0	6	1	85	−84	0		0–8	1–17	0–13	—

Source: WSE Rink Hockey

=== Group B ===
Pos	Team	Pld	W	D	L	GF	GA	GD	Pts	Qualification	GIJ	PAL	COU	MER
1	(Spain) Gijón	6	5	0	1	46	19	+27	15	Advance to the Final Four	—	4–0	9–3	9–1
2	(Spain) Palau de Plegamans	6	5	0	1	31	8	+23	15	Advance to the Final Four	5–1	—	5–1	8–0
3	(France) Coutras	6	2	0	4	20	32	−12	6		7–9	1–4	—	4–2
4	(France) Mérignac	6	0	0	6	10	48	−38	0		3–14	1–9	3–4	—

Source: WSE Rink Hockey

== Final four ==
The final four comprises two semi-finals and a final and would take place at the ground of one of the four finalists, before it was cancelled.

=== Bracket ===
Semi-finals
4 April 2020
(Spain) Manlleu
(Spain) Palau de Plegamans
4 April 2020
(Spain) Gijón
(Portugal) Benfica

Final
5 April 2020

== See also ==
- 2019–20 Rink Hockey Euroleague
- 2019–20 World Skate Europe Cup
- World Skate Europe - all competitions
