= 2013–14 OK Liga Femenina =

- League: OK Liga Femenina
- Sport: Roller hockey
- Number of teams: 14
- League champions: Voltregà
- Relegated to Primera División: Borbolla; Traviesas

OK Liga seasons
- ← 2012–13 2014–15 →

The 2013–14 OK Liga Femenina was the sixth edition of Spain's premier women's rink hockey championship.

CP Voltregà won its fourth title in a row.

== Teams ==
OK Liga Femenina 2013–14 teams
OK Liga Femenina 2013–14 teams from Catalonia

| Team | Arena | City/Area |
|---|---|---|
| Alcorcón | Prado de Santo Domingo | Alcorcón |
| Biesca Gijón | Mata-Jove | Gijón |
| Bigues i Riells | Pavelló d'Esports | Bigues i Riells |
| Borbolla | Monte Alto | A Coruña |
| Filtros Cartés Santa María del Pilar | Colegio Santa María Pilar | Madrid |
| Girona | Palau II | Girona |
| Igualada | Les Comes | Igualada |
| Manlleu | Pavelló d'Esports | Manlleu |
| Palau de Plegamans | Maria Víctor | Palau-solità i Plegamans |
| Sant Cugat | Pavelló Municipal | Sant Cugat del Vallès |
| SFERIC Terrassa | Poliesportiu La Maurina | Terrassa |
| Traviesas | Pavillón de Bouzas | Vigo |
| Vilanova | Pavelló d'Esports | Vilanova i la Geltrú |
| Voltregà | Victorià Oliveras de la Riva | Sant Hipòlit de Voltregà |

== League table ==
| Pos | Team | Pld | W | D | L | GF | GA | GD | Pts | Qualification or relegation |
|---|---|---|---|---|---|---|---|---|---|---|
| 1 | Voltregà | 26 | 24 | 1 | 1 | 139 | 28 | +111 | 73 | Qualification to European Cup (Note: Alcorcón qualified to the European Cup as title holder of the previous edition.) |
| 2 | Manlleu | 26 | 22 | 1 | 3 | 165 | 40 | +125 | 67 | Qualification to European Cup |
| 3 | Biesca Gijón | 26 | 20 | 0 | 6 | 100 | 44 | +56 | 60 | Qualification to European Cup |
| 4 | Vilanova | 26 | 17 | 2 | 7 | 84 | 43 | +41 | 53 | |
| 5 | Palau de Plegamans | 26 | 17 | 1 | 8 | 79 | 46 | +33 | 52 | |
| 6 | Alcorcón | 26 | 14 | 1 | 11 | 64 | 43 | +21 | 43 | Qualification to European Cup |
| 7 | Bigues i Riells | 26 | 12 | 2 | 12 | 67 | 50 | +17 | 38 | |
| 8 | Sant Cugat | 26 | 11 | 2 | 13 | 74 | 71 | +3 | 35 | |
| 9 | SFERIC Terrassa | 26 | 11 | 2 | 13 | 67 | 72 | −5 | 35 | |
| 10 | Igualada | 26 | 8 | 3 | 15 | 77 | 82 | −5 | 27 | |
| 11 | Girona | 26 | 8 | 2 | 16 | 67 | 76 | −9 | 26 | |
| 12 | Filtros Cartés Santa María del Pilar | 26 | 7 | 1 | 18 | 60 | 105 | −45 | 22 | |
| 13 | Borbolla | 26 | 2 | 0 | 24 | 23 | 152 | −129 | 6 | Relegation to Primera División |
| 14 | Traviesas | 26 | 0 | 0 | 26 | 5 | 219 | −214 | 0 | Relegation to Primera División |

Source: FEP.es
Notes:

2013–14 OK Liga Femenina winners
(Catalonia)
Voltregà
Fourth title

== Copa de la Reina ==
2014 Copa de la Reina
Tournament details
- Dates: 15–16 February 2014

Final positions
- Champions: Voltregà (5th title)
- Runners-up: Manlleu

Awards and statistics
- MVP: (Spain) Natasha Lee

The 2014 Copa de la Reina was the 9th edition of the Spanish women's roller hockey cup. It was played in Lloret de Mar between the four first qualified teams after the first half of the season.

Voltregà won its fifth title ever after beating Manlleu by 3–1 in the final.

Semifinals
15 February
Manlleu | 5
Palau de Plegamans | 3
15 February
Manlleu | 9
Voltregà | 3

Final
16 February
Manlleu | 1
Voltregà | 3
