= 2015–16 CERH Women's European Cup =

Roller hockey competition organized by CERH

Tournament details
- Dates: 29 November 2015 – 20 March 2016
- Teams: 16 (from 7 associations)

Final positions
- Champions: (Spain) Voltregà (4th title)
- Runners-up: (Spain) Manlleu

Tournament statistics
- Matches played: 27
- Goals scored: 264 (9.78 per match)

The 2015–16 CERH Women's European Cup was the 10th season of Europe's premier club roller hockey competition organized by CERH. In this season, the number of teams increased to sixteen form seven National Associations.

== Teams ==
TH: Title holders

Spain	Germany	France	Portugal	Switzerland	Austria	Italy
Plegamans; Voltregà; Manlleu; Gijón	Iserlohn; Bison Calenberg; Darmstadt	Coutras; Noisy le Grand; Mérignac	Benfica^{TH}; Académica	Montreux; Vordemwald	Villach	Matera

== Results ==
The draw was held at CERH headquarters in Lisbon, Portugal, on 6 September 2015.

Preliminary round
(France) Coutras	5	11	16
(Switzerland) RHC Vordemwald	1	3	4
(Germany) ERG Iserlohn	3	3	6
(Spain) CP Gijón Solimar	8	5	13
(Germany) RSC Darmstadt	1	2	3
(Spain) CP Voltregà	12	10	22
(Germany) SC Bison Calenberg	3	1	4
(France) CS Noisy le Grand	6	6	12
(Spain) HC Palau de Plegamans	10	10	20
(Switzerland) Montreux HC	0	1	1
(Italy) ASDP Matera	1	1	2
(Portugal) SL Benfica	4	13	17
(Portugal) Académica	4	2	6
(Spain) CP Manlleu	3	7	10
(France) SA Mérignac	22	17	39
(Austria) RHC Villach	1	1	2

Quarter-finals
(France) US Coutras	3	2	5
(Spain) CP Gijón Solimar	5	7	12
(Spain) CP Voltregà	7	8	15
(France) CS Noisy le Grand	0	2	2
(Spain) HC Palau de Plegamans	6	5	11
(Portugal) Benfica	4	2	6
(Spain) CP Manlleu	5	10	15
(France) SA Mérignac	0	0	0

Semi-finals
(Spain) CP Gijón Solimar	2
(Spain) Voltregà	3
(Spain) HC Palau de Plegamans	3
(Spain) CP Manlleu	5

Final
(Spain) Voltregà	4
(Spain) CP Manlleu	4

== Final four ==
The final four tournament took place on 19 and 20 March 2016 in Manlleu, Spain.

=== Semi-finals ===
19 March 2016
17:00 UTC+01:00

Gijón (Spain)	2–3	(Spain) Voltregà

Pabellon Municipal de deportes de Manlleu
19 March 2016
19:30 UTC+01:00

Palau de Plegamans (Spain)	3–5	(Spain) Manlleu

Pabellon Municipal de deportes de Manlleu

=== Final ===
20 March 2016
12:00 UTC+01:00

Voltregà (Spain)	4–4 (pso 2–1)	(Spain) Manlleu

Pabellon Municipal de deportes de Manlleu

2015–16 CERH Women European League winners
(Spain)
CP Voltregà
4th title

== See also ==
- 2015–16 CERH European League
- 2015–16 CERS Cup
