= 2014–15 OK Liga Femenina =

- League: OK Liga Femenina
- Sport: Roller hockey
- Number of teams: 13
- League champions: Palau de Plegamans
- Relegated to Primera División: Sant Cugat; Santa María del Pilar

OK Liga seasons
- ← 2013–14 2015–16 →

The 2014–15 OK Liga Femenina was the eighth edition of Spain's premier women's rink hockey championship.

Palau de Plegamans won its first title ever.

== Teams ==
OK Liga Femenina 2014–15 teams
OK Liga Femenina 2014–15 teams from Catalonia

Team	Arena	City/Area
Alcorcón Cat's Best	Prado de Santo Domingo	Alcorcón
Banco Mediolanum Mataró	Jaume Parera	Mataró
Bigues i Riells	Pavelló d'Esports	Bigues i Riells
Filtros Cartés Santa María del Pilar	Colegio Santa María Pilar	Madrid
Generali Palau de Plegamans	Maria Víctor	Palau-solità i Plegamans
Girona	Palau II	Girona
Hostelcur Gijón	Mata-Jove	Gijón
Igualada	Les Comes	Igualada
Manlleu	Pavelló d'Esports	Manlleu
Sant Cugat	Pavelló Municipal	Sant Cugat del Vallès
SFERIC Terrassa	Poliesportiu La Maurina	Terrassa
Vilanova Estació Nàutica	Pavelló d'Esports	Vilanova i la Geltrú
Voltregà	Victorià Oliveras de la Riva	Sant Hipòlit de Voltregà

== League table ==
Pos	Team	Pld	W	D	L	GF	GA	GD	Pts	Qualification or relegation
1	Generali Palau de Plegamans	24	19	3	2	98	40	+58	60	Qualification to European Cup
2	Voltregà	24	19	2	3	107	31	+76	59	Qualification to European Cup
3	Manlleu	24	18	2	4	121	45	+76	56	Qualification to European Cup
4	Hostelcur Gijón	24	18	2	4	110	43	+67	56	Qualification to European Cup
5	Banco Mediolanum Mataró	24	11	4	9	50	55	−5	37	
6	Vilanova Estació Nàutica	24	9	6	9	62	59	+3	33	
7	SFERIC Terrassa	24	10	2	12	59	59	0	32	
8	Igualada	24	9	2	13	61	86	−25	29	
9	Bigues i Riells	24	6	5	13	41	70	−29	23	
10	Alcorcón Cat's Best	24	6	4	14	33	68	−35	22	
11	Girona	24	3	7	14	49	73	−24	16	
12	Sant Cugat	24	4	3	17	33	88	−55	15	Relegation to Primera División
13	Filtros Cartés Santa María del Pilar	24	3	0	21	29	122	−93	9	Relegation to Primera División

Source: FEP.es

2014–15 OK Liga Femenina winners
(Catalonia)
Generali Palau de Plegamans
First title

== Copa de la Reina ==
2015 Copa de la Reina
Tournament details
- Dates: 6–8 March 2015

Final positions
- Champions: Manlleu (1st title)
- Runners-up: Voltregà

Awards and statistics
- MVP: (Spain) Yolanda Font

The 2015 Copa de la Reina was the 10th edition of the Spanish women's roller hockey cup. As in the previous year, it was played in Lloret de Mar, this time between the eight first qualified teams after the first half of the season.

Manlleu won its first title ever after beating 3–2 Voltregà in the final.

Quarterfinals
6 March
Manlleu	3
Igualada	1
6 March
Generali Palau de Plegamans	0
Banco Mediolanum Mataró	1
6 March
Hostelcur Gijón	1
SFERIC Terrassa	0
6 March
Voltregà	5
Alcorcón Cat's Best	2

Semifinals
7 March
Manlleu	3
Banco Mediolanum Mataró	2
7 March
Hostelcur Gijón	1
Voltregà	2

Final
8 March
Manlleu	3
Voltregà	2
