= 2012–13 OK Liga Femenina =

- League: OK Liga Femenina
- Sport: Roller hockey
- Duration: September 2012–May 25, 2013
- Teams: 14
- League champions: Voltregà
- Runners-up: Biesca Gijón
- Top scorer: Laura Vall, 49 goals
- Relegated to Primera División Femenina: Reus Deportiu & Cerdanyola

OK Liga seasons
- ← 2011–12 2013–14 →

The 2012–13 OK Liga Femenina was the fifth edition of Spain's premier women's rink hockey championship, running from September 15, 2012 to May 25, 2013.

CP Voltregà won its third title in a row while Reus Deportiu and Cerdanyola were relegated to Primera Nacional. Despite to finish in relegation positions, Borbolla and Traviesas regained its spots in OK Liga, as Reus and Cerdanyola resigned to their places in the league due to their financial problems.

Voltregà, Biesca Gijón, Girona and Alcorcón qualified for CERH Women's Euroleague.

== Teams ==
OK Liga Femenina 2013–14 teams
OK Liga Femenina 2013–14 teams from Catalonia

Team	Arena	Established	City/Area
Voltregà	Victorià Oliveras de la Riva	1955	Sant Hipòlit de Voltregà
Girona	Palau II	1940	Girona
Fontanellas y Martí	Les Comes	1950	Igualada
Biesca Gijón	Pabellón Mata-Jove	1995	Gijón
Alcorcón Cat's Best	Prado Santo Domingo	1980	Alcorcón
Reus Deportiu	Palau d'Esports	1909	Reus
Bigues i Riells	Pavelló d'Esports	1991	Bigues i Riells
Vilanova	Pavelló d'Esports	1951	Vilanova i la Geltrú
SFERIC Terrassa	Poliesportiu La Maurina	1950	Terrassa
Palau de Plegamans	Maria Víctor	1975	Palau-solità i Plegamans
Maheco Cerdanyola	Pavelló Can Xarau	1936	Cerdanyola del Vallès
Traviesas	Pavillón de Bouzas	1969	Vigo
Manlleu	Pavelló d'Esports	1973	Manlleu
Borbolla	Monte Alto	1990	A Coruña

== Standings ==
	Team	P	W	D	L	GF	GA	GD	Pts
1	(Catalonia) Voltregà	26	21	2	3	125	44	81	65
2	(Asturias) Biesca Gijón	26	19	2	5	86	48	38	59
3	(Catalonia) Girona	26	16	5	5	94	50	44	53
4	(Community of Madrid) Alcorcón Cat's Best	26	16	4	6	84	55	29	52
5	(Catalonia) Reus	26	16	3	7	89	55	34	51
6	(Catalonia) Fontanellas y Martí	26	14	2	10	97	72	25	44
7	(Catalonia) Manlleu	26	14	2	10	121	83	38	44
8	(Catalonia) SFERIC Terrassa	26	11	3	12	71	68	3	36
9	(Catalonia) Palau de Plegamans	26	10	5	11	74	72	2	35
10	(Catalonia) Bigues i Riells	26	8	6	12	54	51	3	30
11	(Catalonia) Vilanova	26	7	3	16	62	71	−9	24
12	(Catalonia) Maheco Cerdanyola	26	6	4	16	74	112	−38	22
13	(Galicia (Spain)) Borbolla	26	2	1	23	37	149	−112	7
14	(Galicia (Spain)) Traviesas	26	1	0	25	13	151	−138	3

European League
Relegated

2012–13 OK Liga Femenina winners
(Catalonia)
Voltregà
Third title

== Top scorers ==
Rank	Player	Team	Goals
1	(Spain) Laura Vall	Manlleu	49
2	(Spain) María Díez	Biesca Gijón	40
3	(Spain) Raquel Bernardas	Fontanellas y Martí	39
4	(Spain) Carla Giudici	Voltregà	32
5	(Spain) Rita Díaz	Maheco Cerdanyola	29

== Copa de la Reina ==
2013 Copa de la Reina
Tournament details
- Dates: 13–14 April 2013

Final positions
- Champions: Biesca Gijón (2nd title)
- Runners-up: Alcorcón

The 2013 Copa de la Reina was the 8th edition of the Spanish women's roller hockey cup. It was played in Sant Hipòlit de Voltregà between the four first qualified teams after the first half of the season.

Biesca Gijón won its second consecutive title after beating CP Alcorcón by 3–2 in the final, thanks to a golden goal.

Semifinals
13 April
Alcorcón	6
Reus Deportiu	4
13 April
Voltregà	2
Biesca Gijón	3

Final
14 April
Alcorcón	2
Biesca Gijón (a.e.t.)	3
