= 2015–16 OK Liga Femenina =

- League: OK Liga Femenina
- Sport: Roller hockey
- Number of teams: 14
- League champions: Voltregà (5th title)
- Runners-up: Biesca Gijón
- Relegated to Primera División: Aqua Igualada; Citylift Girona; Santa María del Pilar

OK Liga seasons
- ← 2014–15 2016–17 →

The 2015–16 OK Liga Femenina was the eighth edition of Spain's premier women's rink hockey championship.

CP Voltregà won its fifth title and tenth overall including the defunct Spanish Championship.

== Teams ==
OK Liga Femenina 2015–16 teams
OK Liga Femenina 2015–16 teams from Catalonia

Team	Arena	City/Area
Alcorcón	Prado de Santo Domingo	Alcorcón
Aqua Igualada	Les Comes	Igualada
Bigues i Riells	Pavelló d'Esports	Bigues i Riells
Cerdanyola	Can Xarau	Cerdanyola del Vallès
Citylift Girona	Palau II	Girona
Generali Palau de Plegamans	Maria Víctor	Palau-solità i Plegamans
Hostelcur Gijón	Mata-Jove	Gijón
Las Rozas	Pabellón Municipal	Las Rozas
Manlleu	Pavelló d'Esports	Manlleu
Medicare System Mataró	Jaume Parera	Mataró
SFERIC Terrassa	Poliesportiu La Maurina	Terrassa
Vilanova	Pavelló d'Esports	Vilanova i la Geltrú
Voltregà	Victorià Oliveras de la Riva	Sant Hipòlit de Voltregà
Santa María del Pilar	Colegio Santa María Pilar	Madrid

== League table ==
Pos	Team	Pld	W	D	L	GF	GA	GD	Pts	Qualification or relegation
1	Voltregà	26	22	2	2	120	38	+82	68	Qualification to European Cup
2	Manlleu	26	19	4	3	88	41	+47	61	Qualification to European Cup
3	Hostelcur Gijón	26	18	4	4	111	55	+56	58	Qualification to European Cup
4	Generali Palau de Plegamans	26	18	4	4	74	37	+37	58	Qualification to European Cup
5	Vilanova	26	11	6	9	100	86	+14	39	
6	Las Rozas	26	10	8	8	46	51	−5	38	
7	Medicare System Mataró	26	12	1	13	57	73	−16	37	
8	SFERIC Terrassa	26	11	3	12	71	64	+7	36	
9	Alcorcón	26	10	3	13	49	52	−3	33	
10	Cerdanyola	26	8	3	15	46	61	−15	27	
11	Bigues i Riells	26	8	3	15	49	73	−24	27	
12	Aqua Igualada	26	8	2	16	66	88	−22	26	Relegation to Primera División
13	Citylift Girona	26	3	4	19	45	95	−50	13	Relegation to Primera División
14	Santa María del Pilar	26	0	1	25	25	133	−108	1	Relegation to Primera División

Source: FEP.es

2015–16 OK Liga Femenina winners
(Catalonia)
Voltregà
Fifth title

== Copa de la Reina ==
2016 Copa de la Reina
Tournament details
- Dates: 8–10 April 2017

Final positions
- Champions: Hostelcur Gijón (3rd title)
- Runners-up: Palau de Plegamans

Awards and statistics
- MVP: (Spain) María Díez

The 2016 Copa de la Reina was the 11th edition of the Spanish women's roller hockey cup. As in the previous two years, it was played in Lloret de Mar between the eight first qualified teams after the first half of the season.

Hostelcur Gijón won its third trophy by defeating Generali Palau de Plegamans in the penalty shootout.

Quarterfinals
8 April
Voltregà	5
Bigues i Riells	3
8 April
Hostelcur Gijón	4
SFERIC Terrassa	3
8 April
Generali Palau de Plegamans	3
Las Rozas	2
8 April
Manlleu	4
Medicare System Mataró	1

Semifinals
9 April
Voltregà	2
Hostelcur Gijón	3
9 April
Generali Palau de Plegamans	3
Manlleu	1

Final
10 April
Hostelcur Gijón (p)	2 (3)
Generali Palau de Plegamans	2 (2)
