= 2017–18 OK Liga Femenina =

OK Liga Femenina
- Season: 2017–18
- Dates: 14 October 2017–26 May 2018
- Champions: Hostelcur Gijón (3rd title)
- Relegated: Liceo; Reus Deportiu; SFERIC Terrassa
- European League: Hostelcur Gijón; Manlleu; Voltregà; Generali Palau de Plegamans
- Matches played: 182
- Goals scored: 1,015 (5.58 per match)
- Top goalscorer: Gemma Solé (38 goals)
- Biggest home win: Gijón 10–0 Alcorcón (5 May 2018)
- Biggest away win: Las Rozas 2–11 Gijón (26 May 2018)
- Highest scoring: Las Rozas 2–11 Gijón (26 May 2018)

The 2017–18 OK Liga Femenina was the 10th season of the top-tier league of women's rink hockey in Spain. It started on 14 October 2017 and finished on 26 May 2018.

Hostelcur Gijón repeated as champion and achieved their third title overall.

== Teams ==
OK Liga Femenina 2017–18 teams
OK Liga Femenina 2017–18 teams from Catalonia

Vila-sana promoted as champion of the Nacional Catalana. Due to the resigns to promote of Borbolla and Coslada, Citylift Girona and Reus Deportiu occupied their places as second and third qualified teams of the Nacional Catalana.

Team	Arena	City/Area
Alcorcón	Prado de Santo Domingo	Alcorcón
Bigues i Riells	Pavelló d'Esports	Bigues i Riells
Calmar Vilanova	Pavelló d'Esports	Vilanova i la Geltrú
Cerdanyola	Can Xarau	Cerdanyola del Vallès
Citylift Girona	Palau II	Girona
Generali Palau de Plegamans	Maria Víctor	Palau-solità i Plegamans
Hostelcur Gijón	Mata-Jove	Gijón
Las Rozas	Pabellón Municipal	Las Rozas
Liceo	Elviña	A Coruña
Manlleu	Pavelló d'Esports	Manlleu
Reus Deportiu	Pavelló del Reus Deportiu	Reus
SFERIC Terrassa	La Maurina	Terrassa
Vila-sana	Pavelló d'Esports	Vila-sana
Voltregà	Victorià Oliveras de la Riva	Sant Hipòlit de Voltregà

== League table ==
Pos	Team	Pld	W	D	L	GF	GA	GD	Pts	Qualification or relegation
1	Hostelcur Gijón (C)	26	20	3	3	129	41	+88	63	Qualification to European League
2	Manlleu	26	19	2	5	94	51	+43	59	Qualification to European League
3	Voltregà	26	19	1	6	87	52	+35	58	Qualification to European League
4	Generali Palau de Plegamans	26	16	5	5	85	44	+41	53	Qualification to European League
5	Calmar Vilanova	26	13	3	10	70	65	+5	42	
6	Cerdanyola	26	11	5	10	91	94	−3	38	
7	Las Rozas	26	11	5	10	55	65	−10	38	
8	Vila-sana	26	11	4	11	62	69	−7	37	
9	Alcorcón	26	10	3	13	66	90	−24	33	
10	Bigues i Riells	26	10	2	14	72	90	−18	32	
11	Citylift Girona	26	8	3	15	75	91	−16	27	
12	Liceo (R)	26	7	2	17	41	77	−36	23	Relegation to lower divisions
13	Reus Deportiu (R)	26	4	1	21	40	90	−50	13	Relegation to lower divisions
14	SFERIC Terrassa (R)	26	3	1	22	48	96	−48	10	Relegation to lower divisions

Source: FEP.es
(C) Champions; (R) Relegated

== Results ==
Home \ Away	ALC	BIG	VNO	CER	GIR	PLE	GIJ	ROZ	LIC	MAN	REU	TER	VSA	VOL
Alcorcón	—	4–5	2–3	7–5	0–3	4–3	4–3	1–0	1–1	0–3	5–4	3–2	3–4	1–3
Bigues i Riells	2–0	—	2–2	2–3	6–5	1–1	1–7	1–2	1–3	5–7	7–0	2–1	2–5	2–4
Calmar Vilanova	2–2	6–2	—	4–6	3–1	1–5	1–6	1–3	1–2	1–3	3–2	5–3	1–1	2–4
Cerdanyola	7–5	6–3	1–3	—	4–6	3–3	2–3	4–1	3–1	2–6	4–0	7–5	3–3	4–7
Citylift Girona	4–4	1–3	3–7	4–5	—	0–5	2–4	3–4	1–2	1–4	7–4	3–0	2–0	4–6
Generali Palau de Plegamans	9–2	6–2	3–1	3–3	2–2	—	1–3	4–0	3–1	1–2	2–0	3–0	4–2	4–3
Hostelcur Gijón	10–0	9–1	2–3	7–2	5–3	0–2	—	4–1	1–1	4–3	6–1	8–1	6–1	6–2
Las Rozas	6–1	3–1	1–2	3–3	2–2	1–6	2–11	—	5–2	3–0	3–1	2–0	4–1	0–3
Liceo	4–6	0–5	0–5	2–4	2–3	1–4	0–3	1–0	—	0–2	3–2	2–3	1–4	2–6
Manlleu	2–1	4–5	2–1	6–2	6–1	2–3	3–3	3–3	3–1	—	2–1	7–2	6–2	4–3
Reus Deportiu	0–2	3–2	1–2	2–4	4–6	2–1	1–5	2–2	4–5	0–5	—	3–1	0–2	1–3
SFERIC Terrassa	2–5	2–5	3–4	2–2	1–2	2–4	1–5	1–2	2–1	1–3	1–2	—	7–4	2–5
Vila-sana	2–1	5–1	2–6	3–2	4–3	2–2	1–4	1–1	2–3	1–4	3–0	3–0	—	3–1
Voltregà	1–2	1–3	3–0	3–0	4–3	4–1	1–1	3–1	3–0	4–2	4–0	4–3	2–1	—

Source: FEP.es
Legend: Blue = home team win; Yellow = draw; Red = away team win.

== Top goalscorers ==
Rank	Player	Team	Goals
1	(Spain) Gemma Solé	Cerdanyola	38
2	(Spain) Victòria Porta	Vila-sana	37
3	(Spain) Marta Borràs	Bigues i Riells	30
4	(Spain) María Díez	Hostelcur Gijón	28
5	(Spain) Laura Puigdueta	Generali Palau de Plegamans	27
6	(Spain) Anna Casarramona	Hostelcur Gijón	26
6	(Italy) Giulia Galeassi	Las Rozas	26
8	(Spain) Laura Barcons	Manlleu	10
8	(Spain) Laia Castro	Citylift Girona	10
8	(Chile) Catalina Flores	Calmar Vilanova	10

== Copa de la Reina ==
2018 Copa de la Reina
Tournament details
- Arena: Pavelló d'Esports, Vilanova i la Geltrú
- Dates: 2–4 March 2018

Final positions
- Champions: Calmar Vilanova (2nd title)
- Runners-up: Hostelcur Gijón

The 2018 Copa de la Reina was the 13th edition of the Spanish women's roller hockey cup. It was played at the Pavelló d'Esports of Vilanova i la Geltrú between 2 and 4 March 2018.

The competition that will be played by the seven first qualified teams at the end of the first half of the league and Calmar Vilanova as host team.

Calmar Vilanova won their second title, nine years after their first one.

=== Bracket ===
Quarterfinals
2 March
Voltregà	2
Bigues i Riells	0
2 March
Hostelcur Gijón (a.e.t.)	6
Generali Palau de Plegamans	3
2 March
Manlleu	1
Calmar Vilanova	2
2 March
Cerdanyola	1
Vila-sana	4

Semifinals
3 March
Voltregà	3 (1)
Hostelcur Gijón (p)	3 (2)
3 March
Calmar Vilanova	1
Vila-sana	0

Final
4 March
Hostelcur Gijón	1
Calmar Vilanova	2

Source: FEP.es
