= 2010–11 OK Liga Femenina =

Tournament details
- Dates: October 2010 – June 2011
- Teams: 13

Final positions
- Champions: Voltregà
- Runner-up: Girona
- Third Place: Arenys de Munt

Tournament summary
- Matches played: 156
- Goals scored: 894 (5.73 per match)
- Most goals: María Díez, Igualada, 42

The 2010–11 OK Liga Femenina was the third edition of Spain's premier women's rink hockey championship, running from 16 October 2010 to 4 June 2011. CP Mieres didn't take part in the competition, leaving it one team short. Thus the championship was contested by thirteen teams, with Girona CH and Vigo Stick CH replacing relegated teams CP Claret and CD Santa María del Pilar.

CP Voltregà, which also won the European League and the Copa de la Reina, won its first championship with an 8 points margin over CE Arenys and Girona CH. Gijón HC completed the European positions, while defending champion Cerdanyola CH was eighth, 18 points below them. CE Noia and Vigo Stick CH were relegated as the bottom teams, with the Galician team losing all matches.

== Table ==
	Team	P	W	D	L	G+	G−	Pts	2011	Comments
1	(Catalonia) Voltregà	24	19	2	3	103	37	59	2	QF for the 2012 European League
2	(Catalonia) Girona	24	16	3	5	76	38	51	(N)	QF for the 2012 European League
3	(Catalonia) Arenys	24	16	3	5	80	43	51	1	QF for the 2012 European League
4	(Asturias) Gijón	24	15	3	6	69	45	48	2	QF for the 2012 European League
5	(Catalonia) Vilanova	24	15	1	8	76	55	46		
6	(Community of Madrid) Alcorcón	24	13	3	8	72	49	42		
7	(Catalonia) Bigues	24	12	0	12	91	83	36		
8	(Catalonia) Cerdanyola	24	9	3	12	80	74	30	7	
9	(Catalonia) SFERIC Terrassa	24	9	0	15	72	69	27	2	
10	(Catalonia) Igualada	24	8	2	14	71	80	28	2	
11	(Catalonia) Sant Cugat	24	7	1	16	58	85	22	2	
12	(Catalonia) Noia	24	5	3	16	48	76	18	2	Relegated to Segunda División
13	(Galicia (Spain)) Vigo Stick	24	0	0	24	18	160	0	(N)	Relegated to Segunda División

== Top scorers ==
Rank	Player	Team	Goals
1	(Spain) María Díez	Igualada	42
2	(Germany) Maren Wichardt	Bigues	38
3	(Argentina) Pía Sarmiento	Girona	33
4	(Argentina) Luciana Agudo	Gijón	29
4	(England) Claire Currey	Alcorcón	29
6	(Spain) Carla Giudicci	Voltregà	27
6	(Spain) Adriana Gutiérrez	Cerdanyola	27
8	(Spain) Leticia Corrales	Arenys	26
9	(Spain) Cristina Barceló	Voltregà	25
10	(Spain) Natasha Lee	Voltegà	25

== Copa de la Reina ==
2011 Copa de la Reina
Tournament details
- Arena: Mata-Jove, Gijón
- Dates: 12–13 February 2011

Final positions
- Champions: Voltregà (4th title)
- Runners-up: Arenys de Munt

The 2011 Copa de la Reina was the 6th edition of the Spanish women's roller hockey cup. It was played at the Polideportivo de Mata-Jove in Gijón, between the first three qualified teams after the first half of the season and Biesca Gijón as host team.

Voltregà won its fourth cup thanks to a golden goal scored in the final, played against Arenys de Munt.

Semifinals
18 February
Arenys de Munt	3
Vilanova	2
18 February
Biesca Gijón	0
Voltregà	7

Final
19 February
Arenys de Munt	3
Voltregà (a.e.t.)	4
Final
19 February
Biesca Gijón	1
Vilanova	0
