= 2016–17 CERH Women's European Cup =

Tournament details
- Dates: 12 November 2016 - 26 March 2017
- Teams: 13 (from 6 associations)

Final positions
- Champions: (Spain) Voltregà (5th title)
- Runners-up: (Spain) Gijón HC

Tournament statistics
- Matches played: 21
- Goals scored: 174 (8.29 per match)
- Top scorer(s): (Portugal) Rita Lopes (Benfica); 12 goals

The 2016–17 CERH Women's European Cup is the 11th season of Europe's premier female club roller hockey competition organized by CERH.

== Teams ==
Location of teams of the 2016–17 CERH Women's European Cup.

Participating teams
(Spain) Voltregà^{TH} (1st)	(France) Mérignac (2nd)	(Italy) Molfetta
(Spain) Manlleu (2nd)	(France) Noisy le Grand (3rd)	(Portugal) Benfica (1st)
(Spain) Gijón (3rd)	(Germany) Iserlohn (1st)	(Switzerland) Vordemwald (1st)
(Spain) Palau de Plegamans (4th)	(Germany) Bison Calenberg (3rd)	
(France) Coutras (1st)	(Germany) Darmstadt (4th)	

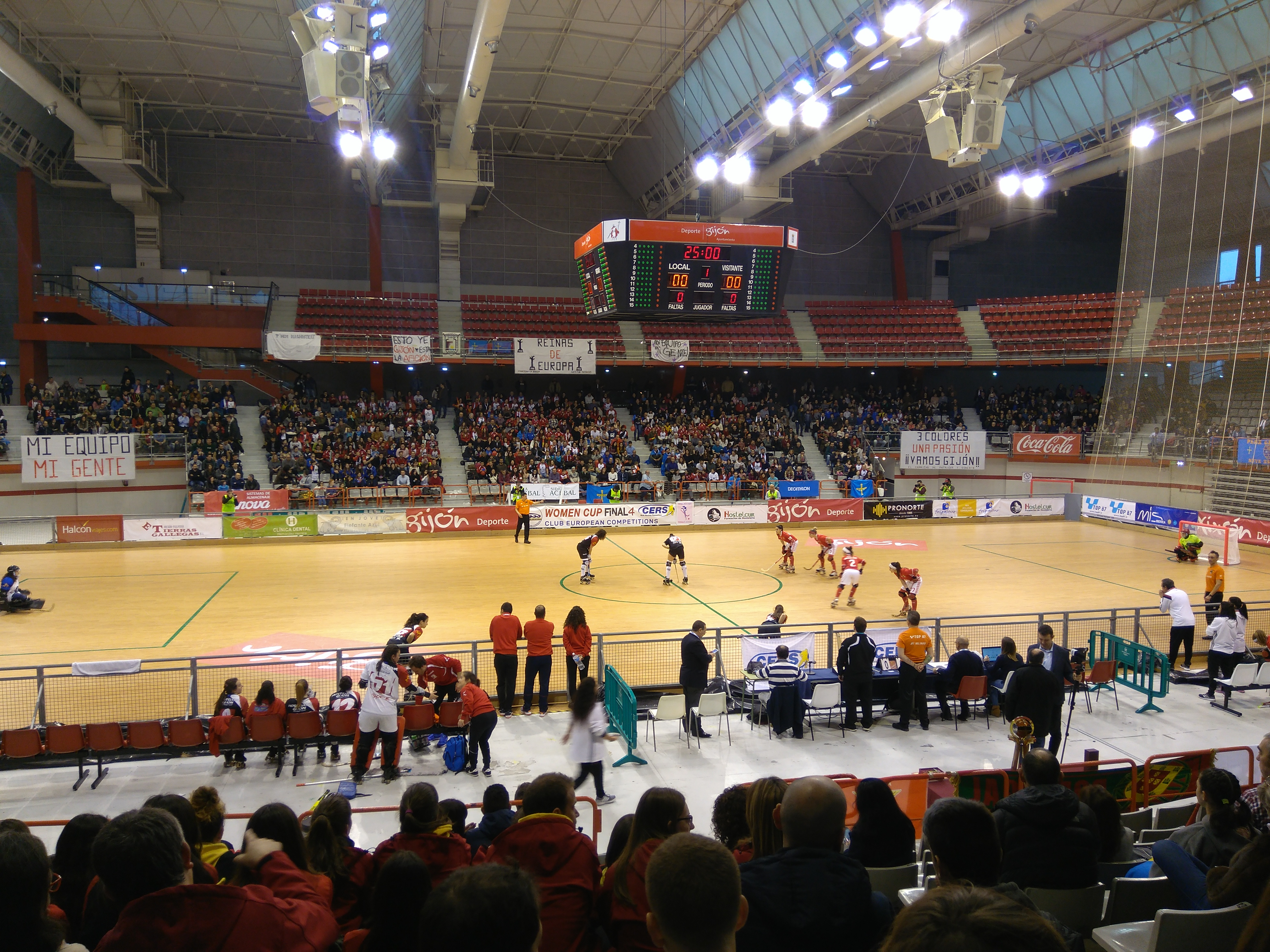
Semifinal match between Gijón and Benfica.

== Results ==
The draw was held at CERH headquarters in Lisbon, Portugal, on 6 September 2015.

Preliminary round
12 November and 3 December 2016
(France) Mérignac	0	2	2
(Portugal) Benfica	5	7	12
12 November and 3 December 2016
(France) Coutras	1	7	8
(Germany) Iselhorn	1	4	5
12 November and 3 December 2016
(Germany) Darmstad	1	0	1
(Spain) Palau de Plegamans	8	11	19
12 November and 3 December 2016
(Germany) Bison Calenberg	1	3	4
(Spain) Gijón	12	14	26
12 November and 3 December 2016
(France) Noisy le Grand	10	2	12
(Switzerland) Vordemwald	2	2	4

Quarter-finals
21 January and 18 February 2017
(Portugal) Benfica	10	5	15
(France) Coutras	2	2	4
21 January and 18 February 2017
(Spain) Palau de Plegamans	2	1	3
(Spain) Gijón	4	1	5
21 January and 18 February 2017
(Spain) Voltregà	10	11	21
(France) Noisy le Grand	0	1	1
21 January and 18 February 2017
(Italy) Molfetta	2	2	4
(Spain) Manlleu	6	7	13

Semi-finals
25 March 2017
(Portugal) Benfica	3
(Spain) Gijón	4
25 March 2017
(Spain) Voltregà	5
(Spain) Manlleu	2

Final
26 March 2017
(Spain) Gijón	0
(Spain) Voltregà	1

== Final four ==
The final four tournament took place on 25 and 26 March 2017 in Gijón, Spain.

=== Semi-finals ===
25 March 2017
18:30 (CET)

Benfica (Portugal)	3–4 (a.e.t.)	(Spain) Gijón
Rita Lopes 18', 32'; Rute Lopes 23'	Report	Marta González 2'; María Díez 22'; Anna Casarramona 29' 59'

Palacio de Deportes de Gijón
Referee: Joseph Silecchia (ITA), Claudio Ferraro (ITA)
25 March 2017
20:30 (CET)

Voltregà (Spain)	5–2	(Spain) Manlleu
Nara López 22', 48'; Berta Tarrida 32'; Adriana Gutiérrez 34'; Natasha Lee 35'	Report	Laura Barcons 29'; Judit Burgaya 48'

Palacio de Deportes de Gijón
Referee: Frank Schafer (GER), Sascha Goldhausen (GER)

=== Final ===
26 March 2017
12:00 (CEST)

Gijón (Spain)	0–1	(Spain) Voltregà
	Report	Natasha Lee 11'

Palacio de Deportes de Gijón
Referee: Jordi Steff (SUI), Johannes Schneider (SUI)

2016–17 CERH Women European League winners
(Spain)
CP Voltregà
5th title

== Top goalscorers ==
Rank	Player	Club	Goals
1	(Portugal) Rita Lopes	(Portugal) Benfica	12
2	(Portugal) Marlene Sousa	(Portugal) Benfica	10
3	(Spain) Marta González	(Spain) Gijón	9
4	(Spain) María Díez	(Spain) Gijón	8
4	(Spain) Anna Casarramona	(Spain) Gijón	8

== See also ==
- 2016–17 CERH European League
- 2016–17 CERS Cup
