= SFERIC Terrassa =

- Full name: Agrupació Sagrada Familia Esportiva; Recreativa i Cultural de Terrassa
- League: OK Liga
- Founded: 1932 (rink hockey: 1950)
- Home ground: Poliesportiu La Maurina, Terrassa, Catalonia

Personnel
- Manager: Guillem Pérez Coca
Home

Agrupació Sagrada Familia Esportiva Recreativa i Cultural de Terrassa, better known as SFERIC Terrassa, is a Catalan sports club from Terrassa, Vallès Occidental. It was founded in 1932 in Terrassa's Ca n'Aurell district's Sagrada Familia church as a basketball club, originally named simply Sagrada Familia de Terrassa. In 1950 a rink hockey section was added. The club is nowadays best known for its women's rink hockey's side, which plays in the OK Liga, the premier national category.

== Season to season ==
=== Women's team ===
Season	Tier	Division	Pos.	Copa de la Reina	European Cup
2009–10	1	OK Liga	11th		
2010–11	1	OK Liga	9th		
2011–12	1	OK Liga	9th		
2012–13	1	OK Liga	8th		
2013–14	1	OK Liga	9th		
2014–15	1	OK Liga	7th	Quarterfinalist	
2015–16	1	OK Liga	8th	Quarterfinalist	
2016–17	1	OK Liga	8th	Quarterfinalist	
2017–18	1	OK Liga	14th		
