= 2017–18 CERH Women's European League =

2017–18 CERH Women's European Cup
Tournament details
- Teams: 15 (from 6 associations)

Final positions
- Champions: (Spain) Gijón (5th title)
- Runners-up: (Portugal) Benfica

The 2017–18 CERH Women's European Cup is the 12th season of Europe's premier female club roller hockey competition organized by CERH.

== Format ==
Location of teams of the 2017–18 Women's European League.

Fourteen teams joined the first round while title holders Voltregà got a wildcard for the quarterfinals.

== Teams ==
Fifteen teams from six federations joined the competition. The participants were confirmed on 19 September 2017.

Participating teams
(Spain) Gijón (1st)	(France) Noisy le Grand (2nd)	(Portugal) Benfica (1st)
(Spain) Voltregà^{TH} (2nd)	(France) Mérignac (3rd)	(Portugal) Stuart (2nd)
(Spain) Palau de Plegamans (3rd)	(Germany) Iserlohn (1st)	(Switzerland) Vordemwald (1st)
(Spain) Bigues i Riells (4th)	(Germany) Bison Calenberg (2nd)	(Switzerland) Uttigen (2nd)
(France) Coutras (1st)	(Germany) Düsseldorf-Nord (3rd)	(Italy) Estrelas Molfetta (1st)

== Results ==
The draw was held at CERH headquarters in Lisbon, Portugal, on 23 September 2017.

Preliminary round
(Spain) Palau de Plegamans	1	2	3
(Portugal) Benfica (p)	0	3	3
(Italy) Estrelas Molfetta	4	3	7
(Switzerland) Vordemwald	1	4	5
(Switzerland) Uttigen	0	0	0
(Germany) Iserlohn	14	12	26
(Germany) Düsseldorf-Nord	0	1	1
(France) Noisy le Grand	9	5	14
(Portugal) Stuart	10	10	20
(Germany) Bison Calenberg	1	2	3
(France) Mérignac	4	1	5
(Spain) Gijón	10	11	21
(France) Coutras	0	1	1
(Spain) Bigues i Riells	5	4	9

Quarterfinals
(Portugal) Benfica	15	10	25
(Italy) Estrelas Molfetta	2	2	4
(Spain) Voltregà	4	3	7
(Germany) Iserlohn	4	2	6
(France) Noisy le Grand	2	3	5
(Portugal) Stuart	7	3	10
(Spain) Gijón	7	6	13
(Spain) Bigues i Riells	1	2	3

Semifinals
(Portugal) Benfica	5
(Spain) Voltregà	4
(Portugal) Stuart	4
(Spain) Gijón	7

Final
(Portugal) Benfica	3
(Spain) Gijón	4

=== Preliminary round ===
The first leg was played on 11 November and the second leg on 2 December 2017.

Team 1	Agg.	Team 2	1st leg	2nd leg
Coutras (France)	1–9	(Spain) Bigues i Riells	0–5	1–4
Palau de Plegamans (Spain)	3–3 (1–2 p)	(Portugal) Benfica	1–0	2–3
Uttigen (Switzerland)	0–26	(Germany) Iserlohn	0–14	0–12
Stuart (Portugal)	20–3	(Germany) Bison Calenberg	10–1	10–2
Estrelas Molfetta (Italy)	7–5	(Switzerland) Vordemwald	4–1	3–4
Mérignac (France)	5–21	(Spain) Gijón	4–10	1–11
Düsseldorf-Nord (Germany)	1–14	(France) Noisy le Grand	0–9	1–5

=== Quarterfinals ===
The quarterfinals will be played on 20 January and 17 February 2018.

Team 1	Agg.	Team 2	1st leg	2nd leg
Voltregà (Spain)	7–6	(Germany) Iserlohn	4–4	3–2
Gijón (Spain)	13–3	(Spain) Bigues i Riells	7–1	6–2
Noisy le Grand (France)	5–10	(Portugal) Stuart	2–7	3–3
Benfica (Portugal)	25–4	(Italy) Estrelas Molfetta	15–2	10–2

== Final Four ==
The Final Four was hosted in Lisbon, Portugal.

=== Semifinals ===
17 March 2018
15:00 (WET, UTC±00:00)

Benfica (Portugal)	5–4	(Spain) Voltregà
Rita Lopes 11'; Rute Lopes 38'; Macarena Astorga 41', 47'; Marlene Teixeira 46'	Report	Berta Tarrida 7', 12', 35'; Adriana Gutiérrez 21'

Pavilhão Fidelidade, Lisbon
Referee: Joseph Silecchia (ITA), Claudio Ferraro (ITA)

17 March 2018
18:00 (WET, UTC±00:00)

Stuart (Portugal)	4–7	(Spain) Gijón
Ana Ferreira 22', 24'; Tânia Rodrigues 38', 42'	Report	Sara Roces 21'; María Diez 25'; Sara González 26'; Marta González 26', 43' (d.f.); Julieta Fernández 36', 43'

Pavilhão Fidelidade, Lisbon
Referee: Pascal Hanras (FRA), Stéphane Rizzoti (FRA)

==== Final ====
18 March 2018
18:00 (WET, UTC±00:00)

Benfica (Portugal)	3–4	(Spain) Gijón
Marlene Teixeira 6' (d.f.), 35'; Rute Lopes 28'	Report	Julieta Fernández 2'; María Díez 10'; Marta González 29', 37'

Pavilhão Fidelidade, Lisbon
Attendance: 1,800
Referee: Massimiliano Carmazzi (ITA), Filippo Fronte (ITA)

== See also ==
- 2017–18 CERH European League
- 2017–18 CERS Cup
