= 2007 CERH Women's European League =

The 2007 CERH Women's European League was the inaugural edition of CERH's competition for women's rink hockey teams. It took place in Sant Hipòlit de Voltregà between May 24 – 27, 2007 and it was contested by fourteen teams from six countries. Gijón HC defeated CE Arenys de Munt in the final to win the competition.

== Group stage ==
=== Group A ===
Pos	Team	Pld	W	D	L	PF	PA	PD	Pts	Qualification	VOL	COU	CRO	MEA
1	(Spain) Calzedonia Voltregà	3	3	0	0	19	1	+18	9	Advance to semifinals	—	6–0	—	2–0
2	(France) Coutras	3	1	1	1	8	10	−2	4		—	—	6–2	2–2
3	(Germany) Cronenberg	3	1	0	2	6	19	−13	3		1–11	—	—	—
4	(Portugal) Mealhada	3	0	1	2	4	7	−3	1		—	—	2–3	—

Source: RinkHockey.net

=== Group B ===
Pos	Team	Pld	W	D	L	PF	PA	PD	Pts	Qualification	GIJ	NOI	BRE
1	(Spain) Biesca Gijón	2	2	0	0	11	3	+8	6	Advance to semifinals	—	3–2	—
2	(France) Noisy le Grand	2	1	0	1	16	5	+11	3		—	—	14–2
3	(Germany) Amatori Breganze	2	0	0	2	3	22	−19	0		1–8	—	—

Source: RinkHockey.net

=== Group C ===
Pos	Team	Pld	W	D	L	PF	PA	PD	Pts	Qualification	HER	ALF	EBO
1	(Germany) Germania Herringen	2	2	0	0	8	1	+7	6	Advance to semifinals	—	4–1	—
2	(Portugal) Alfena	2	1	0	1	4	5	−1	3		—	—	3–1
3	(Italy) Eboli	2	0	0	2	1	7	−6	0		0–4	—	—

Source: RinkHockey.net

=== Group D ===
Pos	Team	Pld	W	D	L	PF	PA	PD	Pts	Qualification	ARE	GLE	DUS	BUR
1	(Spain) Arenys de Munt	3	3	0	0	20	4	+16	9	Advance to semifinals	—	8–1	—	—
2	(France) Gleizé-Beaujolais	3	2	0	1	8	12	−4	6		—	—	5–3	2–1
3	(Germany) Düsseldorf-Nord	3	1	0	2	11	15	−4	3		3–7	—	—	5–3
4	(England) Bury St Edmunds	3	0	0	3	4	12	−8	0		0–5	—	—	—

Source: RinkHockey.net

== Placement Rounds ==
=== Round 1 ===
	Team #1	Score	Team #2
5th–8th	Coutras (France)	8–1	(France) Gleizé-Beaujolais
5th–8th	Noisy le Grand (France)	5–1	(Portugal) Alfena
9th–12th	Cronenberg (Germany)	8–4	(Germany) Düsseldorf-Nord
9th–12th	Amatori Breganze (Italy)	4–1	(Italy) Eboli

=== Round 2 ===
	Team #1	Score	Team #2
5th–6th	Noisy le Grand (France)	5–3	(France) Coutras
7th–8th	Gleizé-Beaujolais (France)	5–3	(Portugal) Alfena
9th–10th	Cronenberg (Germany)	10–4	(Italy) Amatori Breganze
11th–12th	Düsseldorf_Nord (Germany)	5–3	(Italy) Eboli
13th–14th	Mealhada (Portugal)	6–2	(England) Bury St Edmonds

== Final Four ==
Semifinals
26 May
(Spain) Calzedonia Voltregà	1 (1)
(Spain) Arenys de Munt (p)	1 (3)
26 May
(Spain) Biesca Gijón	2
(Germany) Germania Herringen	1

Final
27 May
(Spain) Arenys de Munt	0
(Spain) Biesca Gijón (g.g.)	1
Third place
27 May
(Spain) Calzedonia Voltregà	0 (1)
(Spain) Germania Herringen	1 (3)
