= 2012–13 CERH Women's European League =

2012-13 CERH Women's European League
Final positions
- Champions: (Spain) CP Voltregà (3rd title)
- Runners-up: (Spain) Girona CH

The 2012–13 CERH Women's European League was the 7th season of Europe's premier female club roller hockey competition organized by CERH. The tournament was won by CP Voltregà, it took place in Girona.

== Results ==
Preliminary round
15 December 2012 and 19 January 2013
(Spain) Igualada | 6 | 3 | 9
(Switzerland) Vordemwald | 3 | 0 | 3
15 December 2012 and 19 January 2013
(Switzerland) Diessbach | 3 | 3 | 6
(France) Noisy le Grand | 6 | 8 | 14
15 December 2012 and 19 January 2013
(France) Ploufragan | 0 | 3 | 3
(Germany) Iselhorn | 15 | 2 | 17

Quarter-finals
16 February and 16 March 2013
(Spain) Igualada | 5 | 3 | 8
(France) Noisy le Grand | 2 | 7 | 9
16 February and 16 March 2013
(Spain) Girona | 5 | 4 | 9
(Germany) Iselhorn | 2 | 3 | 5
16 February and 16 March 2013
(France) Coutras | 0 | 1 | 1
(Spain) Voltregà | 1 | 2 | 3
16 February and 16 March 2013
(Spain) Gijón | 7 | 9 | 16
(Germany) Düsseldorf-Nord | 1 | 1 | 2

Semi-finals
4 May 2013
(France) Noisy le Grand | 2
(Spain) Girona | 7
4 May 2013
(Spain) Voltregà | 3
(Spain) Gijón | 1

Final
5 May 2013
(Spain) Girona | 2
(Spain) Voltregà | 3
Third place
5 May 2013
(France) Noisy le Grand | 1
(Spain) Gijón | 5
