= 2010 CERH Women's European Cup =

Tournament details
- Teams: 11 (from 5 associations)

Final positions
- Champions: (Spain) Gijón (3rd title)
- Runners-up: (Spain) Alcorcón

Tournament statistics
- Matches played: 20
- Goals scored: 165 (8.25 per match)

The 2010 CERH Women's European League was the 4th season of Europe's premier female club roller hockey competition organized by CERH.

Gijón defended its title and achieved its third crown.

== Results ==
The Final Four was played in Gijón, Spain

Preliminary round
(Germany) Cronenberg	11	2	13
(Spain) Mieres	6	2	8
(Switzerland) Diessbach	1	4	5
(Portugal) Nafarros	3	10	13
(Switzerland) Friedlingen	1	4	5
(Italy) Viareggio	9	4	13
(Spain) Alcorcón	8	6	14
(Portugal) Marco	1	6	7

Quarter-finals
(Germany) Cronenberg	7	4	11
(France) Noisy le Grand	1	2	3
(Germany) Düsseldorf-Nord	1	1	2
(Spain) Gijón	5	4	9
(France) Coutras	7	2	9
(Portugal) Nafarros	3	3	6
(Italy) Viareggio	1	2	3
(Spain) Alcorcón	5	14	19

Semi-finals
1 May
(Germany) Cronenberg	1
(Spain) Gijón	6
1 May
(France) Coutras	3
(Spain) Alcorcón	4

Final
2 May
(Spain) Gijón	5
(Spain) Alcorcón	2
Third place
2 May
(Germany) Cronenberg	0
(France) Coutras	6

2010 CERH Women European League winners
(Spain)
Gijón
Third title
