= Girona CH =

Citylift Girona
- Full name: Girona Club d'Hoquei
- League: OK Liga
- Founded: 1940
- Home ground: Palau II, Girona, Catalonia

Personnel
- Manager: Sergio Alonso
Home	Away

Girona Club de Hoquei is a Spanish roller hockey club from Girona, Catalonia that was established in 1940.

== History ==
The women's team plays in the OK Liga, and it has been the championship's runner-up in 2011 and 2012. In 2012 it also reached the European League's final, lost to Gijón HC.

The men's team promoted to OK Liga for the first time ever in 2016 after three promotions in four seasons.

== Season to season ==
=== Men's team ===
Season	Tier	Division	Pos.	Copa del Rey	European competitions	
2007–08	2	1ª División	13th			
2008–09	2	1ª División	15th			
2009–10	3	Nacional	14th			
2010–11	4	1ª Catalana	9th			
2011–12	4	1ª Catalana	3rd			
2012–13	4	1ª Catalana	1st			
2013–14	3	Nacional	4th			
2014–15	3	Nacional	1st			
2015–16	2	1ª División	3rd			
2016–17	1	OK Liga	13th			
2017–18	1	OK Liga	7th	Quarterfinalist		
2018–19	1	OK Liga	9th		2 WS Europe Cup	R16

=== Women's team ===
Season	Tier	Division	Pos.	Copa de la Reina	European Cup
2008–09	(Note: Catalan teams refused to participate in the new OK Liga. Despite being relegated, as in the next season several teams joined the OK Liga, Girona remained in the Nacional Catalana, that became the second division for teams from that region.)	Catalan league	13th		
2009–10	2	Nacional	1st		
2010–11	1	OK Liga	2nd		
2011–12	1	OK Liga	2nd	Semifinalist	Runner-up
2012–13	1	OK Liga	3rd		Runner-up
2013–14	1	OK Liga	11th		Round of 16
2014–15	1	OK Liga	11th		
2015–16	1	OK Liga	13th		
2016–17	2	Nacional	2nd (Note: Promoted thanks to the resignation of other teams.)		
2017–18	1	OK Liga	11th		
2018–19	1	OK Liga	10th		
