= CP Alcorcón =

Spanish rink hockey club

Alcorcón
- Full name: Club Patín Alcorcón
- League: OK Liga
- Founded: 1982
- Home ground: Prado Santo Domingo, Alcorcón, Madrid (Capacity 500)

Personnel
- Chairman: Laura Puebla
- Manager: Erick Naser
Home

Club Patín Alcorcón is a Spanish rink hockey club based in Alcorcón, Madrid.

== History ==
Founded in 1982, CP Alcorcón is best known for its women's team, which competes in the OK Liga. In 2009 it was the runner-up of the OK Liga and the Copa de la Reina, and in 2010 it reached the final of the CERH Women's European League, lost to Gijón HC.

In March 2014, Alcorcón won the CERH Women's European League for the first time.

== Trophies ==
- European League: 1
  - 2013–14

== Season to season ==
Season	Tier	Division	Pos.	Copa de la Reina	European Cup
2004–05	1	Cto. España	2nd	—N/a	—N/a
2005–06	1	Cto. España	4th	Third place	—N/a
2006–07	1	Cto. España	4th	Quarterfinalist	
2007–08	1	Cto. España	5th	Quarterfinalist	
2008–09	1	OK Liga	2nd	Runner-up	
2009–10	1	OK Liga	6th		Runner-up
2010–11	1	OK Liga	6th		
2011–12	1	OK Liga	5th		
2012–13	1	OK Liga	4th	Runner-up	
2013–14	1	OK Liga	6th		Champion
2014–15	1	OK Liga	10th		Quarterfinals
2015–16	1	OK Liga	9th		
2016–17	1	OK Liga	9th		
2017–18	1	OK Liga	9th		
2018–19	1	OK Liga	11th		
