= 2009–10 OK Liga Femenina =

- League: OK Liga Femenina
- Sport: Roller hockey
- Number of teams: 14
- League champions: Cerdanyola
- Relegated to Primera División: Claret; Santa María del Pilar

OK Liga seasons
- ← 2008–09 2010–11 →

The 2009–10 OK Liga Femenina was the second edition of Spain's premier women's rink hockey championship. This edition was the first one with Catalan teams, after the refusal of these to play the first edition due to the high cost of the travels during the competition.

Cerdanyola HC won its first title ever.

== Teams ==
Team	Arena	City/Area
Alcorcón Cat's Best	Prado de Santo Domingo	Alcorcón
Arenys de Munt	Pavelló Municipal	Arenys de Munt
Biesca Gijón	Mata-Jove	Gijón
Bigues i Riells	Pavelló d'Esports	Bigues i Riells
Cerdanyola	Can Xarau	Cerdanyola del Vallès
Claret		Seville
Filtros Cartés Santa María del Pilar	Colegio Santa María Pilar	Madrid
Igualada	Les Comes	Igualada
Mieres	Visiola Rollán	Mieres
Sant Cugat	Pavelló Municipal	Sant Cugat del Vallès
SFERIC Terrassa	Poliesportiu La Maurina	Terrassa
Noia Freixenet	Olímpic de l'Ateneu	Sant Sadurní d'Anoia
Vilanova Mopesa	Pavelló d'Esports	Vilanova i la Geltrú
Voltregà	Victorià Oliveras de la Riva	Sant Hipòlit de Voltregà

== League table ==
Pos	Team	Pld	W	D	L	GF	GA	GD	Pts	Qualification or relegation
1	Cerdanyola	26	20	4	2	156	68	+88	64	Qualification to European Cup
2	Biesca Gijón	26	19	6	1	99	34	+65	63	Qualification to European Cup
3	Voltregà	26	20	2	4	143	43	+100	62	Qualification to European Cup
4	Arenys de Munt	26	19	3	4	154	51	+103	60	Qualification to European Cup
5	Vilanova Mopesa	26	19	3	4	118	51	+67	60	
6	Alcorcón Cat's Best	26	12	4	10	102	65	+37	40	
7	Bigues i Riells	26	12	1	13	84	73	+11	37	
8	Igualada	26	10	3	13	85	80	+5	33	
9	Sant Cugat	26	11	0	15	84	103	−19	33	
10	Noia Freixenet	26	8	2	16	72	83	−11	26	
11	SFERIC Terrassa	26	7	1	18	73	103	−30	22	
12	Mieres	26	6	2	18	95	164	−69	20	
13	Claret	26	2	1	23	46	195	−149	7	Relegation to Primera División
14	Filtros Cartés Santa María del Pilar	26	0	2	24	17	215	−198	2	Relegation to Primera División

Source: FEP.es

2009–10 OK Liga Femenina winners
(Catalonia)
Cerdanyola
First title

== Copa de la Reina ==
2010 Copa de la Reina
Tournament details
- Arena: Vilanova i la Geltrú
- Dates: 20–21 February 2010

Final positions
- Champions: Cerdanyola (1st title)
- Runners-up: Voltregà

Awards and statistics
- MVP: (Spain) Mònica Piosa

The 2010 Copa de la Reina was the 5th edition of the Spanish women's roller hockey cup. It was played in Vilanova i la Geltrú, between the first three qualified teams after the first half of the season and Vilanova as host team.

Cerdanyola won its first cup ever by beating Voltregà in the final with a goal of MVP Mònica Piosa with 13 seconds left.

Semifinals
20 February
Voltregà	4
Biesca Gijón	2
20 February
Cerdanyola	5
Vilanova	4

Final
21 February
Cerdanyola	5
Voltregà	4
