= El Ter Industrial Museum – Can Sanglas =

Coordinates: 41°59′57.42″N 2°17′26.72″E

El Ter Industrial Museum
- Museu Industrial del Ter
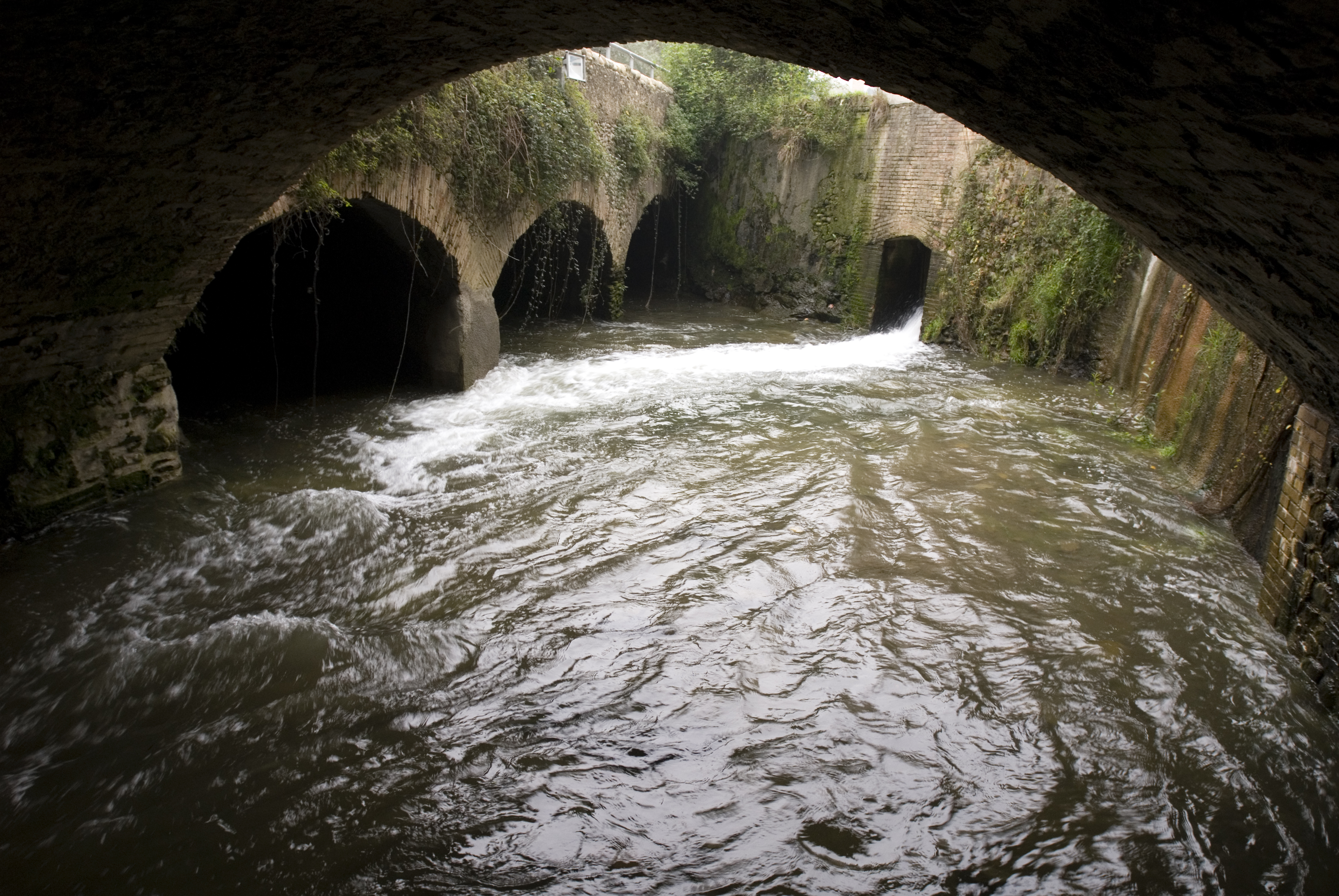
- The MIT
- Established: June 2004
- Location: Manlleu (Catalonia)
- Type: Industry museum
- Website: Museu Industrial del Ter

The El Ter Industrial Museum (Catalan: Museu Industrial del Ter) or MIT, in Manlleu (Osona), is a museum about the territory and society whose impact goes beyond the building walls and the collection within, in order to emphasize the value of the industrial and natural heritage of the middle basin of the Ter. The MIT is in Can Sanglas, an old spinning factory from 1841, which houses three permanent exhibitions: "La fàbrica de riu" (The river factory), "La societat industrial" (The industrial society) and "Els rius mediterranis" (Mediterranean rivers) and the Mediterranean Rivers Study Centre, or CERM. In addition, it organises temporary exhibitions and different activities to get to know the area's unique industrialisation process and the biodiversity of the Ter and other Mediterranean rivers. Other MIT areas to visit outside Can Sanglas are the Borgonyà colony (Sant Vicenç de Torelló), which has an interpretation centre, and the Rusiñol colony, in Manlleu. Opened on 23 June 2004, the MIT is part of the Science and Technology Museum of Catalonia, the Barcelona Provincial Council Local Museum Network and the Osona Museum Network.
