= 2013–14 CERH Women's European Cup =

2013–14 2013-14 CERH Women's European League
Tournament details
- Dates: 14 December 2013 – 16 March 2014
- Teams: 16 (from 7 associations)

Final positions
- Champions: (Spain) CP Alcorcón (1st title)
- Runners-up: (France) CS Noisy le Grand

Tournament statistics
- Matches played: 23
- Goals scored: 202 (8.78 per match)

The 2013–14 CERH Women's European League was the 8th season of Europe's premier female club roller hockey competition organized by CERH. Sixteen teams from seven national associations qualified to the competition as a result of their respective national league placing in the previous season. Following several knockout rounds, the four best teams contested a final four tournament won by CP Alcorcón, which took place in Coutras.

== Contesting Teams ==
2013-14 Women's European League
(Spain) CP Voltregà	(Spain) Girona CH	(Spain) Gijón Solimar	(Spain) CP Alcorcón
(France) US Coutras	(France) CS Noisy le Grand	(France) ASTA Nantes	
(Switzerland) RHC Diessbach	(Switzerland) Vordemwald	(Switzerland) RSC Uttigen	
(Germany) ERG Iserlohn	(Germany) TUS Düsseldorf		
(England) Ely RHC	(England) Bury RHC		
(Italy) Bassano			
(Portugal) SL Benfica

== Knockout stage ==
First round
1	(France) CS Noisy le Grand	16	19	35
16	(England) Bury RHC	0	2	2
8	(Spain) Gijón Solimar	12	4	16
9	(France) ASTA Nantes	0	1	1
5	(Spain) CP Voltregà	8	10	18
12	(Switzerland) Vordemwald	1	1	2
4	(Spain) Girona CH	9	F
13	(England) Ely RHC	0	C	10
6	(Germany) ERG Iserlohn	10	7	17
11	(Switzerland) RSC Uttigen	3	1	4
3	(Spain) CP Alcorcón	F
14	(Portugal) ~~SL Benfica~~	C
7	(Switzerland) RHC Diessbach	2	2	4
10	(Italy) Bassano	0	9	9
2	(France) US Coutras	F
15	(Germany) ~~TUS Dusseldorf~~	C

Quarter-finals
(France) CS Noisy le Grand	3	3	6
(Spain) Gijón Solimar	2	3	5
(Spain) CP Voltregà	16	9	25
(England) Ely RHC	0	0	0
(Germany) ERG Iserlohn	1	2	3
(Spain) CP Alcorcón	4	4	8
(Italy) Bassano	1	2	2
(France) US Coutras	4	6	10

Semi-finals
(France) CS Noisy le Grand	4	G	4
(Spain) CP Voltregà	3	P	3
(Spain) CP Alcorcón	2
(France) US Coutras	1

Final
(France) CS Noisy le Grand	3
(Spain) CP Alcorcón	4

== Final four ==
The final-four round was played at US Coutras's ground, the Patinoire Milou Ducourtioux, Coutras, in France between the days 15 and 16 of March 2014.

Semi-finals
15 March - Coutras
(France) CS Noisy le Grand	4 (G)
(Spain) CP Voltregà	3(P)
15 March - Coutras
(Spain) CP Alcorcón	2
(France) US Coutras	1

Final
16 March - Coutras
(France) CS Noisy le Grand	3
(Spain) CP Alcorcón	4
Third place
16 March - Coutras
(Spain) CP Voltregà	4
(France) US Coutras	5

=== Semi-finals ===
15 March
16:00 (UTC+01:00)

CS Noisy le Grand (France)	4-3 (a.e.t.)	(Spain) CP Voltregà

Patinoire Milou Ducourtioux, Coutras
Referee: Fermi, Rotelli (Italy)
15 March
18:00 (UTC+01:00)

CP Alcorcón (Spain)	2-1	(France) US Coutras

Patinoire Milou Ducourtioux, Coutras
Referee: Eggiman, Schneider (Switzerland)

=== Relegation match ===
16 March
11:00 (UTC+01:00)

CP Voltregà (Spain)	4-5	(France) US Coutras

Patinoire Milou Ducourtioux, Coutras
Referee: Rotelli (Italy), Schneider (Switzerland)

=== Final ===
16 March
15:00 (UTC+01:00)

CS Noisy le Grand (France)	3-4	(Spain) CP Alcorcón

Patinoire Milou Ducourtioux, Coutras
Referee: Ventura, Guilherme (Portugal)

2013–14 CERH Women European League winners
(Spain)
CP Alcorcón
First title

== See also ==
- 2013–14 CERH European League
- 2013–14 CERS Cup
