= 2009 CERH Women's European Cup =

Tournament details
- Dates: 28 February – 9 May
- Teams: 14 (from 6 associations)

Final positions
- Champions: (Spain) Gijón (2nd title)
- Runners-up: (Spain) Voltregà

Tournament statistics
- Matches played: 22
- Goals scored: 154 (7 per match)

The 2009 CERH Women's European League was the 3rd season of Europe's premier female club roller hockey competition organized by CERH.

Gijón conquered its second title after defeating CP Voltregà in the penalty shootout.

== Results ==
The Final Four was played in Coutras, France. Eboli withdrew from the competition.

Preliminary round
(France) Noisy le Grand	w
(Italy) Eboli
(Switzerland) Montreux	4	2	6
(Portugal) Marco	3	2	5
(France) Coutras	10	7	17
(Switzerland) Diessbach	0	2	2
(Germany) Cronenberg	5	8	13
(Italy) Viareggio	8	6	14
(Spain) Igualada	3	3	6
(Germany) Düsseldorf-Nord	0	2	2
(Switzerland) Weil-am-Rhein	3	4	7
(Italy) Bassano	5	9	14

Quarter-finals
(France) Noisy le Grand	2	1	3
(Spain) Voltregà	4	3	7
(Switzerland) Montreux	5	2	7
(France) Coutras	4	5	9
(Spain) Gijón	6	7	13
(Italy) Viareggio	1	2	3
(Spain) Igualada	5	4	9
(Italy) Bassano	0	2	2

Semi-finals
1 May
(Spain) Voltregà	1
(France) Coutras	6
1 May
(Spain) Gijón	1
(Spain) Igualada	0

Final
2 May
(Spain) Gijón (p)	0 (1)
(Spain) Voltregà	0 (0)
Third place
2 May
(France) Coutras	3
(Spain) Igualada	1

2009 CERH Women European League winners
(Spain)
Gijón
Second title
