= Roller Hockey Women's Intercontinental Cup =

Roller hockey club competition

- Sport: Roller hockey
- Founded: 2018
- No. of teams: 4
- Confederation: World Skate
- Most recent champion: (Spain) CP Vila-sana (2025)
- Most titles: (Argentina) Concepción, Telecable & Vila-sana (1)

The Women's Intercontinental Cup is a roller hockey competition organized by World Skate and contested between the championship clubs from World Skate Africa, World Skate Asia, World Skate Oceania, World Skate Europe, and World Skate America.

== History ==
The tournament was created as part of the merger of the International Federation of Roller Sports (FIRS) and the International Skateboarding Federation (ISF), which created World Skate in 2017. It uses a similar format to the men's Roller Hockey Intercontinental Cup.

== Winners ==
Year	Location	Winner	Score	Runners-up
2018	(Argentina) San Juan	(Argentina) Concepción	4–2	(Spain) Gijón
2024	(Argentina) San Juan	(Spain) Telecable HC	3–3 (2–1 (p))	(Spain) Palau de Plegamans
2025	(Argentina) San Juan	(Spain) Vila-sana	5–3	(Spain) Esneca Fraga

== Statistics ==
=== Winners by team ===
Team	Winners	Runners-up
(Spain) Gijón	1 (2024)	1 (2018)
(Spain) Vila-sana	1 (2025)	0
(Argentina) Concepción	1 (2018)	0
(Spain) Palau de Plegamans		1 (2024)
(Spain) Esneca Fraga		1 (2025)

=== Winners by country ===
Country	Winners	Runners-up
Spain	2	3
Argentina	1	0
