= CE Arenys de Munt =

Arenys de Munt
- Full name: Centre d'Esports Arenys de Munt
- Nickname(s): Arlequinats
- League: OK Liga
- Founded: 1929 (rink hockey: 1960)
- Home ground: Municipal Sports Centre, Arenys de Munt (Catalonia, Spain)

Personnel
- Chairman: Martí Roca
Home

Centre d'Esports Arenys de Munt is a Catalan Spanish sports club from Arenys de Munt, Maresme founded in 1929, hosting football, futsal, rink hockey and rugby teams.

== History ==
Old crest of the club.

CE Arenys de Munt is best known for its rink hockey section, established in 1960. The men's team played in the top category through the 1970s, and in 1977 it reached the Cup Winners' Cup's final, lost to AD Oeiras. The women's team surpassed it from the 1990s, winning two national championships in 1999 and 2004 and reaching the European League's final, lost to Gijón HC. The club was finally relegated from the OK Liga in 2012 and dissolved in 2016.

In 2017, the men's team promoted to the OK Liga 19 years after their last relegation. At the final of this season the club was relegated to Primera División.

== Season to season ==
=== Women's team ===
Season	Tier	Division	Pos.	Copa de la Reina	European Cup
2005–06	2	Catalan league		Runner-up	—N/a
2006–07	2	Catalan league			Runner-up
2007–08	2	Catalan league	5th		
2008–09	(Note: Catalan teams refused to participate in the new OK Liga.)	Catalan league	5th		
2009–10	1	OK Liga	4th		
2010–11	1	OK Liga	3rd	Runner-up	Semifinalist
2011–12	1	OK Liga	13th		Quarterfinalist
2012–13	2	Nacional	12th		
2013–14	2	Nacional	8th		
2014–15	2	Nacional	5th		
2015–16	2	Nacional	12th		

=== Men's team ===
Season	Tier	Division	Pos.
2007–08	3	Nacional	5th
2008–09	3	Nacional	5th
2009–10	3	Nacional	2nd
2010–11	3	Nacional	9th
2011–12	3	Nacional	4th
2012–13	3	Nacional	1st
2013–14	2	1ª División	8th
2014–15	2	1ª División	4th
2015–16	2	1ª División	8th
2016–17	2	1ª División	3rd
2017–18	1	OK Liga	14th

== Titles ==
=== Women's Rink Hockey ===
  - Spanish Championship (2)
    - 1999, 2004
