= 2014–15 CERH Women's European Cup =

Tournament details
- Dates: 22 November 2014 – 15 March 2015
- Teams: 12 (from 5 associations)

Final positions
- Champions: (Portugal) Benfica (1st title)
- Runners-up: (France) Coutras

Tournament statistics
- Matches played: 19
- Goals scored: 136 (7.16 per match)

The 2014–15 CERH Women's European Cup was the 9th season of Europe's premier female club roller hockey competition organized by CERH.

Following several knockout rounds, the four best teams contested a final four tournament, won by Portuguese club Benfica.

== Teams ==
TH: Title holders

Preliminary round
(Spain) Voltregà	(Spain) Manlleu	(France) Vaulx en Velin	(Switzerland) Vordemwald
(Spain) Gijón	(France) Coutras	(Switzerland) Uttigen	(Germany) Düsseldorf Nord
Quarter-finals
(Spain) Alcorcón^{TH}	(Portugal) Benfica	(France) Noisy le Grand	(Germany) Iserlohn

== Round dates ==
The schedule of the competition is as follows (draw held at CERH headquarters in Lisbon, Portugal, on 6 September 2014).

Round	First leg	Second leg
Preliminary round	1 November 2014	13 December 2014
Quarter-finals	17 January 2015	7 February 2015
Semi-finals	14 March 2015	
Final	15 March 2015	

== Preliminary round ==
The first-leg matches were played on 1 November, and the second-leg matches were played on 13 December 2014.

Team 1	Agg.	Team 2	1st leg	2nd leg
Düsseldorf Nord (Germany)	7–10	(France) Vaulx en Velin	3–5	4–5
Uttigen (Switzerland)	1–20	(Spain) Voltregà	1–10	0–10
Vordemwald (Switzerland)	3–13	(France) Coutras	2–7	1–6
Manlleu (Spain)	8–7	(Spain) Gijón	5–2	3–5

== Quarter-finals ==
The first-leg matches were played on 17 January, and the second-leg matches will be played on 7 February 2015.

Team 1	Agg.	Team 2	1st leg	2nd leg
Vaulx en Velin (France)	1–11	(Germany) Iserlohn	1–5	0–6
Noisy le Grand (France)	3–4	(Spain) Manlleu	1–2	2–2
Benfica (Portugal)	10–9	(Spain) Voltregà	8–3	2–6 (a.e.t.)
Alcorcón (Spain)	3–8	(France) Coutras	1–4	2–4

== Final four ==
The final four tournament took place on 14 and 15 March 2015. It was hosted by Manlleu at the Pavelló Municipal d'Esports in Manlleu, Spain.

Semi-finals
14 March 2015 – Manlleu
(France) Coutras	4
(Germany) Iserlohn	1
14 March 2015 – Manlleu
(Portugal) Benfica	4
(Spain) Manlleu	2

Final
15 March 2015 – Manlleu
(France) Coutras	2
(Portugal) Benfica	5

All times listed below are local time (UTC+01:00).

=== Semi-finals ===
14 March 2015
17:30

Coutras (France)	4–1	(Germany) Iserlohn
Julie Lafourcade 4', 36'; Adeline Leborgne 45', 50'	Report	Maren Wichardt 32'

Pavelló Municipal d'Esports, Manlleu
Referee: Joaquin Lopez, Teresa Martinez (Spain)
14 March 2015
20:00

Benfica (Portugal)	4–2	(Spain) Manlleu
Marlene Sousa 2'; Rita Lopes 24', 33'; Inês Vieira 46'	Report	Yolanda Font 5', 32'

Pavelló Municipal d'Esports, Manlleu
Referee: Matteo Galoppi, Franco Ferrari (Italy)

=== Final ===
15 March 2015
12:00

Coutras (France)	2–5	(Portugal) Benfica
Adeline Leborgne 15', 38'	Report	Marlene Sousa 3', 13', 15', 28'; Sofia Vicente 12'

Pavelló Municipal d'Esports, Manlleu
Referee: Salvatore Tartarelli, Alessandro da Prato (Italy)

2014–15 CERH Women European League winners
(Portugal)
Benfica
First title

== See also ==
- 2014–15 CERH European League
- 2014–15 CERS Cup
