= 2018–19 Rink Hockey European Female League =

Tournament details
- Teams: 14 (from 5 associations)

The 2018–19 Rink Hockey European Female League is the 13th season of Europe's premier female club roller hockey competition organized by CERH.

== Format ==
Fourteen teams joined the first round while title holders Gijón and another team by luck of the draw, got a wildcard for the quarterfinals.

== Teams ==
Fourteen teams from five federations joined the competition.

Participating teams
(Spain) Gijón^{TH} (1st)	(France) Mérignac (2nd)	(Portugal) Benfica (1st)
(Spain) Manlleu (2nd)	(France) Noisy le Grand (3rd)	(Portugal) Stuart (2nd)
(Spain) Voltregà (3rd)	(France) Nantes Métropole (4th)	(Switzerland) Vordemwald (1st)
(Spain) Palau de Plegamans (4th)	(Germany) Iserlohn (1st)	(Switzerland) Montreux (2nd)
(France) Coutras (1st)	(Germany) Bison Calenberg (2nd)	

== Results ==
Preliminary round
(Germany) Iserlohn	10	1	11
(France) Mérignac	0	2	2
(France) Coutras	1	2	3
(Portugal) Benfica	4	6	10
(Spain) Voltregà	8	10	18
(Portugal) Stuart	3	0	3
(Spain) Palau Plegamans	15	8	23
(France) Nantes Métropole	1	0	1
(Switzerland) Vordemwald	3	1	4
(France) Noisy le Grand	3	2	5
(Germany) Bison Calenberg	1	1	2
(Spain) Manlleu	6	16	22

Quarterfinals
(Germany) Iserlohn	11	9	20
(Switzerland) Montreux	1	2	3
(Portugal) Benfica	2	1	3
(Spain) Voltregà	1	3	4
(Spain) Palau Plegamans	10	4	14
(France) Noisy le Grand	0	1	1
(Spain) Manlleu	5	3	8
(Spain) Gijón	0	4	4

Semifinals
(Germany) Iserlohn	1
(Spain) Voltregà	9
(Spain) Palau Plegamans	2 (2)
(Spain) Manlleu	2 (1)

Final
(Spain) Palau Plegamans	1
(Spain) Voltregà (aet)	2

=== Preliminary round ===
The first leg was played on 10 November and the second leg on 1 December 2018. Montreux got a wildcard for the quarterfinals.

Team 1	Agg.	Team 2	1st leg	2nd leg
Bison Calenberg (Germany)	2–22	(Spain) Manlleu	1–6	1–16
Vordemwald (Switzerland)	4–5	(France) Noisy le Grand	3–3	1–2
Iserlohn (Germany)	11–2	(France) Mérignac	10–0	1–2
Voltregà (Spain)	18–3	(Portugal) Stuart	8–3	10–0
Coutras (France)	3–10	(Portugal) Benfica	1–4	2–6
Palau de Plegamans (Spain)	23–1	(France) Nantes Métropole	15–1	8–0

=== Quarterfinals ===
The first leg was played on 12 January 2019 and the second leg on 18 February 2019.

Team 1	Agg.	Team 2	1st leg	2nd leg
Benfica (Portugal)	3–4	(Spain) Voltregà	2–1	1–3
Palau de Plegamans (Spain)	14–1	(France) Noisy le Grand	10–0	4–1
Iserlohn (Germany)	20–3	(Switzerland) Montreux	11–1	9–2
Manlleu (Spain)	8–4	(Spain) Gijón	5–0	3–4

== See also ==
- 2018–19 CERH European League
- 2018–19 CERS Cup
- World Skate Europe - all competitions
