= 2012 CERH Women's European Cup =

Final positions
- Champions: (Spain) Gijón HC (4th title)
- Runners-up: (Spain) Girona CH

The 2012 CERH Women's European League was the sixth edition of CERH's competition for women's rink hockey clubs. It took place from 21 January to 6 May 2012, and it was contested by eleven teams from five countries.

Gijón HC defeated Girona CH in the final to win its fourth title. GDR Os Lobinhos and US Coutras, which defeated defending champion CP Voltregà in the quarter-finals, also reached the Final Four, with the Portuguese serving as the host.

== Qualifying round ==
Team #1	Agg.	Team #2	1st	2nd
Noisy (France)	2–6	(Germany) Iserlohn	0–3	2–3
Diessbach (Switzerland)	4–16	(Portugal) Os Lobinhos	2–6	2–10
Nafarros (Portugal)	4–14	(Spain) Girona	2–4	2–10

== Quarter-finals ==
Team #1	Agg.	Team #2	1st	2nd
Coutras (France)	4–3	(Spain) Voltregà	2–0	2–3
Arenys de Munt (Spain)	0–11	(Spain) Girona	0–6	0–5
Düsseldorf-Nord (Germany)	4–22	(Portugal) Os Lobinhos	1–9	3–13
Iserlohn (Germany)	5–6	(Spain) Gijón	0–2	5–4

== Final four ==
- Sintra, Portugal

Semi-finals
5 May
(Portugal) Os Lobinhos	2
(Spain) Girona	3
5 May
(France) Coutras	1
(Spain) Gijón	3

Final
6 May
(Spain) Girona	0
(Spain) Gijón	3
Third place
6 May
(Portugal) Os Lobinhos	3
(France) Coutras	2
