= 2008 CERH Women's European Cup =

2008 CERH European League
Tournament details
- Teams: 13

Final positions
- Champions: (Spain) Voltregà (1st title)
- Runners-up: (Portugal) Fundação Nortecoope

Tournament statistics
- Matches played: 30
- Goals scored: 220 (7.33 per match)

The 2008 CERH Women's European Cup was the 2nd edition of the CERH European League organized by CERH. Its final eight was held in May 2008 at Mealhada, Portugal.

Voltregà achieved their first title.

== Preliminary round ==
Gijón, Herringen and Voltregà received a bye for the final stage.

Team 1	Agg.	Team 2	1st leg	2nd leg
Eboli (Italy)	0–15	(Spain) Mataró	0–9	0–6
Mealhada (Portugal)	12–4	(Switzerland) Diessbach	4–2	8–2
Fundação Nortecoope (Portugal)	8–3	(Germany) Düsseldorf-Nord	4–2	4–1
Noisy le Grand (France)	8–4	(Portugal) Nortecoope	3–2	5–2
Montreux (Switzerland)	5–9	(France) Coutras	2–2	3–7

== Final eight ==
The final eight was played by eight teams in Mealhada, Portugal. Teams were divided into two groups, where the two first qualified teams would join the semifinals.

=== Group stage ===
In each group, teams played against each other home-and-away in a home-and-away round-robin format.

The group winners advanced to the final four.

==== Group A ====
Pos	Team	Pld	W	D	L	GF	GA	GD	Pts	Qualification	FNO	GIJ	MAT	NOI
1	(Portugal) Fundação Nortecoope	3	2	1	0	11	2	+9	7	Advance to semifinals	—	1–1	2–0	—
2	(Spain) Gijón	3	1	1	1	7	7	0	4	Advance to semifinals	—	—	1–0	—
3	(Spain) Mataró	3	1	0	2	3	5	−2	3		—	—	—	3–2
4	(France) Noisy le Grand	3	1	0	2	9	16	−7	3		1–8	6–5	—	—

Source: Rinkhockey.net

==== Group B ====
Pos	Team	Pld	W	D	L	GF	GA	GD	Pts	Qualification	VOL	COU	MEA	HER
1	(Spain) Voltregà	3	3	0	0	16	4	+12	9	Advance to semifinals	—	4–0	7–3	5–1
2	(France) Coutras	3	1	1	1	6	6	0	4	Advance to semifinals	—	—	—	—
3	(Portugal) Mealhada	3	1	1	1	9	10	−1	4		—	1–1	—	5–2
4	(Germany) Herringen	3	0	0	3	4	15	−11	0		—	1–5	—	—

Source: Rinkhockey.net

==== 5th to 8th position ====
Play-outs
24 May
(France) Noisy le Grand	2
(Portugal) Mealhada	3
24 May
(Germany) Herringen	0
(Spain) Mataró	1

Fifth place
25 May
(Portugal) Mealhada	0
(Spain) Mataró	1
Seventh place
25 May
(France) Noisy le Grand	1
(Germany) Herringen	3

==== Final four ====
Semifinals
24 May
(Spain) Gijón	0
(Spain) Voltregà	1
24 May
(France) Coutras	0
(Portugal) Fundação Nortecoope	2

Final
25 May
(Spain) Voltregà	2
(Portugal) Fundação Nortecoope	1
Third place
25 May
(Spain) Gijón	2
(France) Coutras	0
