= 2015–16 CERS Cup =

Tournament details
- Dates: 24 October – 1 May
- Teams: 30 (from 7 associations)

Final positions
- Champions: (Portugal) OC Barcelos (2nd title)
- Runners-up: (Spain) Vilafranca

The 2015–16 CERS Cup was the 36th season of the CERS Cup, Europe's second club roller hockey competition organized by CERH. Thirty teams from seven national associations qualified for the competition as a result of their respective national league placing in the previous season.

== Teams ==
Thirty teams from seven national associations qualified for the competition.

| Spain | Italy | Germany | Switzerland | Portugal | France | Austria |
|---|---|---|---|---|---|---|
| Reus Deportiu; Cerceda; CP Voltregà; CP Vilafranca; PAS Alcoy | Follonica Hockey; Pieve; Amatori Lodi; Matera; Sarzana | SK Germania Herringen; RSC Cronenberg; TuS Düsseldorf; Bison-Calenberg; RSC Darmstadt | Montreux HC; Genève RHC; Diessbach; RSC Uttigen; RHC Uri | Sporting (TH); OC Barcelos; Juv. Viana; HC Turquel | La Vendéenne; Saint Omer; US Coutras | RHC Dornbirn; RHC Wolfurt; RHC Villach |

== Preliminary phase ==
The preliminary phase legs took place on 24 October and 28 November 2015.

| Team 1 | Agg. | Team 2 | 1st leg | 2nd leg |
|---|---|---|---|---|
| Sarzana (Italy) | 6–3 | (Germany) TuS Düsseldorf | 3–1 | 3–3 |
| RSC Uttigen (Switzerland) | 16–10 | (Germany) Bison-Calenberg | 9–3 | 7–7 |
| RSC Cronenberg (Germany) | 12–8 | (Switzerland) RHC Uri | 8–3 | 4–5 |
| RHC Wolfurt (Austria) | 3–20 | (Portugal) HC Turquel | 0–12 | 3–8 |
| Juventude Viana (Portugal) | 17–6 | (Austria) RHC Dornbirn | 11–3 | 6–3 |
| CP Vilafranca (Spain) | 12–2 | (Switzerland) Montreux HC | 9–0 | 3–2 |
| Genève RHC (Switzerland) | 6–10 | (Spain) PAS Alcoy | 5–4 | 1–6 |
| Matera (Italy) | 8–3 | (Spain) Cerceda | 5–1 | 3–2 |
| RSC Darmstadt (Germany) | 8–9 | (Italy) Pieve | 6–3 | 2–6 |
| CP Voltregà (Spain) | 5–7 | (France) Saint Omer | 3–2 | 2–5 |
| OC Barcelos (Portugal) | 32–3 | (Austria) RHC Villach | 16–2 | 16–1 |
| US Coutras (France) | 8–2 | (Switzerland) Diessbach | 2–0 | 6–2 |
| Amatori Lodi (Italy) | 15–7 | (France) La Vendéenne | 8–3 | 7–4 |
| SK Germania Herringen (Germany) | 6–11 | (Italy) Follonica Hockey | 3–4 | 3–7 |

== Knockout phase ==
First round
(Italy) Sarzana | 5 | 3 | 8
(Switzerland) Uttigen | 3 | 3 | 6
(Germany) Cronenberg | 5 | 3 | 8
(Portugal) Sporting CP | 17 | 19 | 36
(Portugal) Turquel | 2 | 5 | 7
(Spain) Reus Deportiu | 3 | 7 | 10
(Portugal) Juventude de Viana | 3 | 3 | 6
(Spain) Vilafranca | 3 | 5 | 8
(Spain) Alcoy | 4 | 3 | 7
(Italy) Matera | 3 | 5 | 8
(Italy) Cremona | 2 | 4 | 6
(France) Saint Omer | 2 | 3 | 5
(Portugal) OC Barcelos | 7 | 12 | 19
(France) Coutras | 7 | 3 | 10
(Italy) Amatori Lodi | 2 | 4 | 6
(Italy) Follonica | 2 | 2 | 4

Quarter-finals
(Italy) Sarzana | 2 | 3 | 5
(Portugal) Sporting CP | 8 | 10 | 18
(Spain) Reus Deportiu | 2 | 1 | 3
(Spain) Vilafranca | 1 | 3 | 4
(Italy) Matera | 10 | 2 | 12
(Italy) Cremona | 0 | 4 | 4
(Portugal) OC Barcelos | 8 | 6 | 14
(Italy) Amatori Lodi | 4 | 6 | 10

Semi-finals
(Portugal) Sporting CP | 1 (1)
(Spain) Vilafranca (p) | 1 (2)
(Italy) Matera | 3 (1)
(Portugal) OC Barcelos (p) | 3 (2)

Final
(Spain) Vilafranca | 3
(Portugal) OC Barcelos | 6

== Final-Four ==
All times are Western European Time.

=== Semi-finals ===
30 April 2016
21:45

| Sporting (Portugal) | 1–1 | (Spain) Vilafranca |
|---|---|---|
| 1–0 Luís Viana 23' | report | 1–1 Rocasalbas 26' (2nd Hf) |
Penalties
| Luís Viana (penalty missed); Daniel Oliveira (penalty missed); Tiago Losna (penalty scored); Ricardo Figueira (penalty missed); Ábalos (penalty missed) | 1–2 | (penalty missed) Eduard Férnandez; (penalty missed) Joan Vázquez; (penalty missed) Marc Navarro; (penalty scored) Jordi Galan; (penalty scored) Roger Rocasalbas |

Pavilhão Municipal de Barcelos
Referee: Franco Ferrari (ITA), Mateo Galopi (ITA)
30 April 2016
19:00

| Matera (Italy) | 3–3 | (Portugal) OC Barcelos |
|---|---|---|
| 1–2 Juan Lopez 30'; 2–2 Valerio Antezza 37'; 3–3 Valerio Antezza 41' | report | 0–1 Reinaldo Ventura 20'; 0–2 Reinaldo Ventura 25'; 2–3 Reinaldo Ventura 40' (2nd half) |
Penalties
| Mattia Ghirardello (penalty missed); Jonathan Cellura (penalty scored); Gonzalo Romero (penalty missed); Juan Lopez (penalty missed); Valerio Antezza (penalty missed) | 1–2 | (penalty scored) Reinaldo Ventura; (penalty missed) Pedro Mendes; (penalty scored) Miguel Vieira; (penalty missed) Hugo Costa |

Pavilhão Municipal de Barcelos
Referee: Jose Gomez (ESP), Juan Melero (ESP)

=== Final ===
1 May 2016
18:30

| Vilafranca (Spain) | 3–6 | (Portugal) OC Barcelos |
|---|---|---|
| 1–0 Rocasalbas 1.32'; 2–1 Vazquez 5.57'; 3–5 Rocasalbas 4.58' (2nd half) | report | 1–1 Costa 5.49'; 2–2 Querido 10.16'; 2–3 Costa 13.41'; 2–4 Querido 19.34'; 2–5 Guimarães 20.20'; 3–6 Querido 21.42' (2nd half) |

Pavilhão Municipal de Barcelos
Attendance: 1670
Referee: (Italy) Franco Ferrarri, (Italy) Mateo Galoppi
