= 2006 Copa de la Reina de Hockey Patines =

Spanish women's rink hockey cup

The 2006 Copa de la Reina de Hockey Patines was the inaugural edition of the Spanish women's rink hockey national cup. It took place on 25 and 26 March 2006 in Burgos, and it was won by CP Voltregà, which defeated CE Arenys de Munt in the final.

== Quarterfinals ==
Team #1	Agg.	Team #2
Biesca (Gijón) (Asturias)	4–3	(Catalonia) Sant Feliu
INEF Galicia (Galicia (Spain))	0–4	(Catalonia) Voltregà
Traviesas (Galicia (Spain))	1–3	(Community of Madrid) Parque Lisboa (Alcorcón)
Órdenes (Galicia (Spain))	0–6	(Catalonia) Arenys de Munt

== Semifinals ==
Team #1	Agg.	Team #2
Biesca (Gijón) (Asturias)	1–3	(Catalonia) Voltregà
Parque Lisboa (Alcorcón) (Community of Madrid)	0–2	(Catalonia) Arenys de Munt

== Third place match ==
Team #1	Agg.	Team #2
Biesca (Gijón) (Asturias)	0–4	(Community of Madrid) Parque Lisboa (Alcorcón)

== Final ==
Team #1	Agg.	Team #2
Voltregà (Catalonia)	4–1	(Catalonia) Arenys de Munt
