= 2008–09 OK Liga Femenina =

- League: OK Liga Femenina
- Sport: Roller hockey
- Teams: 8
- League champions: Biesca Gijón

OK Liga seasons
- 2009–10 →

The 2008–09 OK Liga Femenina was the first edition of Spain's premier women's rink hockey championship. It was played without Catalan teams due to the high cost of the travels during the competition.

Biesca Gijón was the first champion of the new league.

== League table ==
Pos	Team	Pld	W	D	L	GF	GA	GD	Pts	Qualification
1	Biesca Gijón	14	13	1	0	74	5	+69	40	Qualification to European Cup
2	Alcorcón Cats Best	14	12	1	1	73	12	+61	37	Qualification to European Cup
3	Bionet Vicsan Rivas	14	10	0	4	52	20	+32	30	
4	Mieres	14	6	2	6	51	39	+12	20	Qualification to European Cup
5	Filtros Cartés Santa María del Pilar	14	5	1	8	40	43	−3	16	
6	Órdenes	14	5	1	8	30	60	−30	16	
7	Tres Cantos	14	2	0	12	15	52	−37	6	
8	Ávila	14	0	0	14	2	106	−104	0	

Source: FEP.es

2008–09 OK Liga Femenina winners
(Asturias)
Biesca Gijón
First title

== Copa de la Reina ==
2009 Copa de la Reina
Tournament details
- Arena: Mieres
- Dates: 5–8 March 2009

Final positions
- Champions: Vilanova L'Ull Blau (1st title)
- Runners-up: Alcorcón Cat's Best

Awards and statistics
- MVP: (Spain) Pía Sarmiento

The 2009 Copa de la Reina was the 4th edition of the Spanish women's roller hockey cup. It was played in Mieres.

Vilanova L'Ull Blau won its first cup ever by beating Alcorcón Cat's Best in the final by 10–1, the widest win ever in a final of this competition.

Quarter-finals
6 March
Vilanova L'Ull Blau	5
Voltregà	4
6 March
Bionet Vicsab Rivas	5
Órdenes	2
6 March
Biesca Gijón	7
Mieres	1
8 March
Alcorcón Cat's Best	3
Vigo Stick M2009	0

Semi-finals
7 March
Vilanova L'Ull Blau	4
Bionet Vicsab Rivas	2
7 March
Biesca Gijón	3
Alcorcón Cat's Best	4

Final
8 March
Vilanova L'Ull Blau	10
Alcorcón Cat's Best	1
Third place
8 March
Biesca Gijón	3
Bionet Vicsab Rivas	0
