= WSE Women's Champions League =

Roller hockey tournament

- Sport: Roller Hockey
- Founded: 2007; 19 years ago
- No. of teams: 10
- Continent: Europe (World Skate Europe - Rink Hockey)
- Most recent champion: (Spain) Esneca Fraga (2nd title)
- Most titles: (Spain) Voltregà (Spain) Gijón (6 titles each)
- Broadcaster: WSE TV
- Website: Official Website

The WSE Women's Champions League, formerly CERH Women's European Cup (before 2018), is an annual club roller hockey competition organized by World Skate Europe and contested by the top ranked teams in European domestic leagues.

The most successful club is Voltregà and Gijón, having won six titles each.

== Finals ==
Season	Winners	Score	Runners-up	City (finals)
2007	(Spain) Gijón	1–0	(Spain) Arenys de Munt	(Spain) Sant Hipòlit de Voltregà
2008	(Spain) Voltregà	2–1	(Portugal) Fundação Nortecoope	(Portugal) Mealhada
2009	(Spain) Gijón (2)	1–0	(Spain) Voltregà	(France) Coutras
2010	(Spain) Gijón (3)	5–2	(Spain) Alcorcón	(Spain) Gijón
2011	(Spain) Voltregà (2)	2–1	(Spain) Gijón	(Germany) Weil am Rhein
2012	(Spain) Gijón (4)	3–0	(Spain) Girona	(Portugal) Sintra
2012–13	(Spain) Voltregà (3)	3–2	(Spain) Girona	(Spain) Girona
2013–14	(Spain) Alcorcón	4–3	(France) Noisy le Grand	(France) Coutras
2014–15	(Portugal) Benfica	5–2	(France) Coutras	(Spain) Manlleu
2015–16	(Spain) Voltregà (4)	4–4^{(2–1)}	(Spain) Manlleu	(Spain) Manlleu
2016–17	(Spain) Voltregà (5)	1–0	(Spain) Gijón	(Spain) Gijón
2017–18	(Spain) Gijón (5)	4–3	(Portugal) Benfica	(Portugal) Lisbon
2018–19	(Spain) Voltregà (6)	2–1 (aet)	(Spain) Palau de Plegamans	(Spain) Manlleu
2019–20	Abandoned (due to the COVID-19 pandemic in Europe).			
2020–21	(Spain) Palau de Plegamans	6–1	(Spain) Voltregà	(Spain) Palau-solità i Plegamans
2021–22	(Spain) Palau de Plegamans (2)	2–1	(Spain) Telecable Gijón	(Spain) Gijón
2022–23	(Spain) Telecable Gijón (6)	6–1	(Spain) Vila-sana	(Portugal) Lisbon
2023–24	(Spain) Fraga (1)	1–1^{(3–2)}	(Spain) Vila-sana	(Spain) A Coruña
2024–25	(Spain) Palau de Plegamans (3)	1–0	(Spain) Telecable Gijón	(Spain) Palau-solità i Plegamans
2025–26	(Spain) Esneca Fraga (2)	4–1	(Portugal) Benfica	(Portugal) Coimbra

== Performances ==
=== By club ===
Club	Titles	Runners-up	Years won	Years runners-up
(Spain) Voltregà	6	2	2008, 2011, 2013, 2016, 2017, 2019	2009, 2021
(Spain) Gijón	6	4	2007, 2009, 2010, 2012, 2018, 2023	2011, 2017, 2022, 2025
(Spain) Palau de Plegamans	3	1	2021, 2022, 2025	2019
(Spain) Fraga	2	0	2024, 2026	—
(Portugal) Benfica	1	2	2015	2018, 2026
(Spain) Alcorcón	1	1	2014	2010
(Spain) Girona	0	2	—	2012, 2013
(Spain) CP Vila-Sana	0	2	—	2023, 2024
(Spain) Arenys de Munt	0	1	—	2007
(Portugal) Fundação Nortecoope	0	1	—	2008
(France) Noisy le Grand	0	1	—	2014
(France) Coutras	0	1	—	2015
(Spain) Manlleu	0	1	—	2016

=== By country ===
Country	Winners	Runners-up	Winners	Runners-up
Spain	18	12	Voltregà (6), Gijón (6), Palau de Plegamans (3), Fraga (2), Alcorcón	Gijón (4), Girona (2), Voltregà (2), Vila-sana (2), Arenys de Munt, Alcorcón, Manlleu, Palau de Plegamans
Portugal	1	3	Benfica	Benfica (2), Fundação Nortecoope
France	0	2	—	Coutras, Noisy le Grand
