= OK Liga Femenina =

Spanish women's rink hockey league

OK Liga
- Current season, competition or edition: 2025–26 OK Liga Femenina
- Sport: Roller Hockey
- Founded: 2008
- No. of teams: 14
- Country: Spain
- Most recent champion: Gijón Solimar (5)
- Most titles: Voltregà; Palau de Plegamans; Gijón Solimar (5 titles)
- Broadcaster: FEP TV
- Level on pyramid: 1
- Relegation to: Primera División Femenina
- Domestic cup: Copa de la Reina
- Website: fep.es

OK Liga Femenina is a Spanish rink hockey league for women. It has been held since 2008 and is the women's version of the men's OK Liga.

== History ==
The OK Liga Femenina was created in 2008. In its first edition, it was played without Catalan teams due to the high costs of the travels during the competition.

== Competition format ==
The championship is played through 26 matchdays in al round-robin format, a format quite common in other sports such as football. The top team when finished to play the 26 matchdays is the champion.

Conversely, the last team qualified is relegated to Primera División. like Points are awarded as follows:

- 3 points for the winner team
- 1 point if a draw for each team
- 0 points for loser team

== Champions by year ==
=== Campeonato de España ===
The Spanish Championship was played as a knock-out stage in one only city between the best teams at the interregional groups. It worked until 2008, when the current OK Liga was created.

| Year | Host | Champion | Runner-up | Final |
|---|---|---|---|---|
| 1993 | Reus | Igualada | Barberà | |
| 1994 | Alberic | Igualada | INEF Galicia | |
| 1995 | A Coruña | Igualada | INEF Galicia | |
| 1996 | Santander | Igualada | INEF Galicia | |
| 1997 | Vila-seca | Igualada | Santa María del Pilar | |
| 1998 | Santander | Igualada | INEF Galicia | |
| 1999 | Alcoy | Arenys de Munt | INEF Galicia | League |
| 2000 | Santander | Igualada | Arenys de Munt | |
| 2001 | Lloret de Mar | Bigues i Riells | Arenys de Munt | 3–2 |
| 2002 | Ordes | Voltregà | Arenys de Munt | 3–2 |
| 2003 | Santander | Salt | Voltregà | 2–2 (4–3 p) |
| 2004 | Arenys de Munt | Arenys de Munt | Voltregà | 3–2 |
| 2005 | Coslada | Voltregà | Alcorcón | 9–2 |
| 2006 | Sant Hipòlit de Voltregà | Voltregà | Gijón Solimar | League |
| 2007 | Gijón | Voltregà | Gijón Solimar | 4–1 |
| 2008 | Burgos | Voltregà | Igualada | 3–1 |

=== OK Liga ===
| Season | Teams | Champion | Pts | Runner-up | Pts | Third place | Pts |
|---|---|---|---|---|---|---|---|
| 2008–09 | 8 | Gijón Solimar | 40 | Alcorcón | 37 | Rivas Las Lagunas | 30 |
| 2009–10 | 14 | Cerdanyola | 64 | Gijón Solimar | 63 | Voltregà | 62 |
| 2010–11 | 13 | Voltregà | 59 | Girona | 51 | Arenys de Munt | 51 |
| 2011–12 | 14 | Voltregà | 53 | Girona | 50 | Igualada | 50 |
| 2012–13 | 14 | Voltregà | 65 | Gijón Solimar | 59 | Girona | 53 |
| 2013–14 | 14 | Voltregà | 73 | Manlleu | 67 | Gijón Solimar | 60 |
| 2014–15 | 14 | Palau de Plegamans | 60 | Voltregà | 59 | Manlleu | 56 |
| 2015–16 | 14 | Voltregà | 68 | Manlleu | 61 | Gijón Solimar | 58 |
| 2016–17 | 14 | Gijón Solimar | 69 | Voltregà | 58 | Palau de Plegamans | 52 |
| 2017–18 | 14 | Gijón Solimar | 63 | Manlleu | 59 | Voltregà | 58 |
| 2018–19 | 14 | Palau de Plegamans | 70 | Manlleu | 67 | Gijón Solimar | 60 |
| 2019–20 (Note: After being suspended the season due to the COVID-19 pandemic, for the final league table only results of the first half of the season were counted.) | 14 | Manlleu | 34 | Palau de Plegamans | 34 | Cerdanyola | 29 |
| 2020–21 | 16 | Palau de Plegamans | – | Manlleu | – | Gijón Solimar | – |
| 2021–22 | 14 | Palau de Plegamans | – | Gijón Solimar | – | Vila-sana | – |
| 2022–23 | 14 | Gijón Solimar | – | Palau de Plegamans | – | Vila-sana | – |
| 2023–24 | 14 | Palau de Plegamans | – | Esneca Fraga | – | Gijón Solimar | – |
| 2024–25 | 14 | Gijón Solimar | – | Esneca Fraga | – | Vila-sana | – |

== Titles by team ==
=== OK Liga ===
| Team | Winners | Runners-up | Years winners |
|---|---|---|---|
| Voltregà | 5 | 2 | 2011, 2012, 2013, 2014, 2016 |
| Palau de Plegamans | 5 | 2 | 2015, 2019, 2021, 2022, 2024 |
| Gijón Solimar | 5 | 2 | 2009, 2017, 2018, 2023, 2025 |
| Cerdanyola | 1 | 0 | 2010 |
| Manlleu | 1 | 4 | 2020 |
| Girona | 0 | 2 | |
| Esneca Fraga | 0 | 2 | |
| Alcorcón | 0 | 1 | |

=== Overall ===
| Team | Titles won |
|---|---|
| Voltregà | 10 – 2002, 2005, 2006, 2007, 2008, 2011, 2012, 2013, 2014, 2016 |
| Igualada | 7 – 1993, 1994, 1995, 1996, 1997, 1998, 2000 |
| Palau de Plegamans | 5 – 2015, 2019, 2021, 2022, 2024 |
| Gijón Solimar | 5 – 2009, 2017, 2018, 2023, 2025 |
| Arenys de Munt | 2 – 1999, 2004 |
| Bigues i Riells | 1 – 2001 |
| Salt | 1 – 2004 |
| Cerdanyola | 1 – 2010 |
| Manlleu | 1 – 2020 |

== See also ==
- Copa de la Reina
