= CP Manlleu =

Spanish rink hockey club

Manlleu
- Full name: Club Patí Manlleu
- League: M: OK Liga; W: OK Liga
- Founded: 1973
- Home ground: Municipal Sports Centre, Manlleu (Catalonia, Spain)
- Website: cpmanlleu.cat
Home

Club Patí Manlleu is a Spanish rink hockey club from Manlleu, Osona established in 1973, currently competing in the OK Liga Plata and the OK Liga Femenina.

== History ==
Founded in 1973, the first success of CP Manlleu was the first promotion ever of the women's team to the first division in 2012. Two years later, the men's team repeated the success by promoting to the OK Liga.

In 2015, the women's team conquered the first club's title by winning the Copa de la Reina played in Lloret de Mar and in 2016, they lost the final of the 2015–16 CERH Women's European Cup in the penalty shootout against their neighbours Voltregà.

== Season to season ==
=== Women's team ===
Season	Tier	Division	Pos.	Copa de la Reina	European Cup
2011–12	2	Nacional	3rd		
2012–13	1	OK Liga	7th		
2013–14	1	OK Liga	2nd	Runner-up	
2014–15	1	OK Liga	3rd	Champion	Semifinalist
2015–16	1	OK Liga	2nd	Semifinalist	Runner-up
2016–17	1	OK Liga	5th	Semifinalist	Semifinalist
2017–18	1	OK Liga	2nd	Quarterfinalist	
2018–19	1	OK Liga	2nd	Quarterfinalist	Semifinalist

=== Men's team ===
Season	Tier	Division	Pos.
2007–08	3	Nacional	2nd
2008–09	3	Nacional	2nd
2009–10	3	Nacional	3rd
2010–11	3	Nacional	3rd
2011–12	2	1ª División	13th
2012–13	2	1ª División	7th
2013–14	2	1ª División	1st
2014–15	1	OK Liga	14th
2015–16	2	1ª División	2nd
2016–17	1	OK Liga	16th
2017–18	2	1ª División	4th
2018–19	2	OK Liga Plata	5th

== Trophies ==
=== Women's ===
- OK Liga Femenina: 1
  - 2019–20
- Spanish Cup (Copa de la Reina): 1
  - 2015
