= HC Palau de Plegamans =

Catalonian rink hockey club

Palau de Plegamans
- Full name: Hoquei Club Palau de Plegamans
- League: OK Liga
- Founded: 1975
- Home ground: Pavelló Municipal, Palau-solità i Plegamans, Catalonia
- Website: hcpalau.com
Home

Hoquei Club Palau de Plegamans is a Spanish rink hockey club from Palau-solità i Plegamans, Catalonia, established in 1975, mainly known by its women's team, that plays the OK Liga Femenina.

== History ==
Founded in 1975, the women's team promoted to the top tier in 2011, by winning the second division. Only years later, in 2015, the club achieved their first league ever and repeated success in 2019, after beating CP Manlleu after a do-or-die match in the last round.

== Season to season ==
Season	Tier	Division	Pos.	Copa de la Reina	European Cup
2010–11	2	Nacional	1st		
2011–12	1	OK Liga	10th		
2012–13	1	OK Liga	9th		
2013–14	1	OK Liga	5th	Semifinalist	
2014–15	1	OK Liga	1st	Quarterfinalist	
2015–16	1	OK Liga	4th	Runner-up	Semifinalist
2016–17	1	OK Liga	3rd	Semifinalist	Quarterfinalist
2017–18	1	OK Liga	4th	Quarterfinalist	Preliminary
2018–19	1	OK Liga	1st	Quarterfinalist	Runner-up

== Trophies ==
- OK Liga Femenina: 2
  - 2015, 2019
