= CP Voltregà =

Spanish rink hockey club

Voltregà
- Full name: Club Patí Voltregà
- League: M: OK Liga; W: OK Liga
- Founded: 1955
- Home ground: Victorià Oliveras de la Riva Sports Centre, Sant Hipòlit de Voltregà (Catalonia, Spain)

Personnel
- Chairman: Xavi Sala
- Manager: M: Francesc Linares; W: Josep Maria Rovira
- Website: cpvoltrega.com
Home

Club Patí Voltregà is a Spanish rink hockey club from Sant Hipòlit de Voltregà, Osona established in 1955, currently competing in the OK Liga and the OK Liga Femenina.

== History ==
The club enjoyed its golden age between 1960 and 1977; through these years Voltregà won three European Cups, three OK Liga and five national cups. Its best years were 1975 and 1976, when they were both Spanish and European champions. The team's only major trophy in subsequent years was the 2002 CERS Cup.

On the other hand, its women's team has been highly successful in the recent years; it has won triples in 2008 and 2011, including two European Leagues. The years 2016 and 2017 are particularly successful as the girls win back to back the European League, in addition to this, they win the 2015–16 OK Liga and the Copa de la Reina in 2017.

== Season to season ==
=== Men's team ===
Season	Tier	Division	Pos.	Copa del Rey	Supercopa	Europe	
2001–02	1	OK Liga	5th	Semifinalist	—N/a	2 CERS Cup	C
2002–03	1	OK Liga	7th	Quarterfinalist	—N/a	2 CERS Cup	QF
2003–04	1	OK Liga	10th		—N/a	2 CERS Cup	SF
2004–05	1	OK Liga	12th				
2005–06	1	OK Liga	12th				
2006–07	1	OK Liga	11th				
2007–08	1	OK Liga	13th			2 CERS Cup	R16
2008–09	1	OK Liga	15th				
2009–10	2	1ª División	1st				
2010–11	1	OK Liga	11th				
2011–12	1	OK Liga	12th				
2012–13	1	OK Liga	8th				
2013–14	1	OK Liga	10th	Quarterfinalist		2 CERS Cup	PR
2014–15	1	OK Liga	7th	Semifinalist			
2015–16	1	OK Liga	10th	Quarterfinalist		2 CERS Cup	PR
2016–17	1	OK Liga	5th	Quarterfinalist			
2017–18	1	OK Liga	8th		Runner-up	2 CERS Cup	SF
2018–19	1	OK Liga	8th	Quarterfinalist		2 WS Europe Cup	SF

=== Women's team ===
Season	Tier	Division	Pos.	Copa de la Reina	European Cup
2001–02	1	Cto. España	1st	—N/a	—N/a
2002–03	1	Cto. España	2nd	—N/a	—N/a
2003–04	1	Cto. España	2nd	—N/a	—N/a
2004–05	1	Cto. España	1st	—N/a	—N/a
2005–06	1	Cto. España	1st	Champion	—N/a
2006–07	1	Cto. España	1st	Champion	Fourth place
2007–08	1	Cto. España	1st	Champion	Champion
2008–09	(Note: Catalan teams refused to participate in the new OK Liga.)	Catalan league	1st	Quarterfinalist	Runner-up
2009–10	1	OK Liga	3rd	Runner-up	
2010–11	1	OK Liga	1st	Champion	Champion
2011–12	1	OK Liga	1st	Runner-up	Quarter-finalist
2012–13	1	OK Liga	1st	Semifinalist	Champion
2013–14	1	OK Liga	1st	Champion	Fourth place
2014–15	1	OK Liga	2nd	Runner-up	Quarterfinalist
2015–16	1	OK Liga	1st	Semifinalist	Champion
2016–17	1	OK Liga	2nd	Champion	Champion
2017–18	1	OK Liga	3rd	Semifinalist	Semifinalist
2018–19	1	OK Liga	5th	Semifinalist	Champion

== Trophies ==
=== Men's ===
- European Cup: 3
  - 1966, 1975, 1976
- CERS Cup: 2
  - 2002, 2023
- Spanish Championship: 3
  - 1965, 1975, 1976
- Spanish Cup: 5
  - 1960, 1965, 1969, 1974, 1977
- Lliga Catalana: 1
  - 1990–91
- Nations Cup: 1
  - 1961

=== Women's ===
- European League: 6
  - 2008, 2011, 2013, 2016, 2017, 2019
- Spanish League: 5
  - 2011, 2012, 2013, 2014, 2016
- Former Spanish Championship: 5
  - 2003, 2005, 2006, 2007, 2008
- Spanish Cup (Copa de la Reina): 6
  - 2006, 2007, 2008, 2011, 2014, 2017
- Lliga Catalana: 7
  - 2002–03, 2003–04, 2004–05, 2005–06, 2006–07, 2007–08, 2008–09
