= CP Gijón Solimar =

Spanish professional roller hockey club

Telecable Gijón
- Full name: Club Patín Gijón Solimar
- League: OK Liga
- Founded: 1995
- Home ground: Mata-Jove, Gijón, Asturias (Capacity 500)

Personnel
- Chairman: José Luis Souto
- Manager: Fernando Sierra
| Home | Away |

Club Patín Gijón Solimar, also known as Telecable Hockey Club by sponsorship reasons, is a Spanish professional roller hockey club based in Gijón, city in the autonomous community of Asturias (Spain).

== History ==
Gijón Solimar was established in 1995 after the dissolution of CP Algodonera 81 and the hockey section of the Colegio de la Inmaculada.

Its women's team started to outstand in 2003, when it finished champion of the Asturian-Galician championship, qualifying for the first time to the Spanish Championship.

Gijón Solimar, with the sponsorship of Biesca, was one of the founder clubs of the OK Liga Femenina and won its first edition after earning 13 wins and only one draw. It also participated in the first CERH Women's European Cup, played in 2007 becoming also champion. They would repeat success in 2009, 2010 and 2012.

In May 2017, Gijón Solimar conquered its second league title after a streak of 23 games without losses. One year later, the club achieved its fifth European Cup by beating hosts Benfica in the final by 4–3. The club finished the season by retaining the league title, its third overall.

Between 14 and 16 December 2018, Gijón Solimar played the first edition ever of the Intercontinental Cup, but failed to win the title after being defeated in the final 2–4 by Argentinian club Concepción. In that season, the club achieved their fourth Copa de la Reina.

== Sponsorship naming ==
- Biesca Gijón 2004–2013
- Hostelcur Gijón 2014–2018
- Telecable Hockey Club 2018–present

== Head coaches ==
- Fernando Sierra 2001–2012
- Lolo Fernández 2012–2013
- María Fernández 2013–2017
- Rubén Muñoz 2017–2018
- Fernando Sierra 2018–present

== Current roster ==
- 1 Elena González Lolo (goalkeeper)
- 2 Marta González Piquero
- 5 Sara González Lolo (captain)
- 6 Julieta Fernández
- 7 Andrea Soberón
- 8 María Sanjurjo
- 9 Nuria Obeso
- 10 Judit Morera (goalkeeper)
- 22 Sara Roces
- 27 Natasha Lee

== Season to season ==
=== Women's team ===
| Season | Tier | Division | Pos. | Copa de la Reina | European Cup |
|---|---|---|---|---|---|
| 2002–03 | 1 | Cto. España | 4th | —N/a | —N/a |
| 2003–04 | 1 | Cto. España | 4th | —N/a | —N/a |
| 2004–05 | 1 | Cto. España | 5th | —N/a | —N/a |
| 2005–06 | 1 | Cto. España | 2nd | Fourth position | —N/a |
| 2006–07 | 1 | Cto. España | 2nd | Runner-up | Champion |
| 2007–08 | 1 | Cto. España | 3rd | Runner-up | Third position |
| 2008–09 | 1 | OK Liga | 1st | Third position | Champion |
| 2009–10 | 1 | OK Liga | 2nd | Semifinalist | Champion |
| 2010–11 | 1 | OK Liga | 4th | Semifinalist | Runner-up |
| 2011–12 | 1 | OK Liga | 4th | Champion | Champion |
| 2012–13 | 1 | OK Liga | 2nd | Champion | Third position |
| 2013–14 | 1 | OK Liga | 3rd | | Quarterfinals |
| 2014–15 | 1 | OK Liga | 4th | Semifinalist | Preliminary round |
| 2015–16 | 1 | OK Liga | 3rd | Champion | Semifinalist |
| 2016–17 | 1 | OK Liga | 1st | Runner-up | Runner-up |
| 2017–18 | 1 | OK Liga | 1st | Runner-up | Champion |
| 2018–19 | 1 | OK Liga | 3rd | Champion | Quarterfinalist |
| 2019–20 | 1 | OK Liga | 5th | —N/a | Cancelled (semifinalist) |
| 2020–21 | 1 | OK Liga | 3rd | Quarterfinalist | Semifinalist |
| 2021–22 | 1 | OK Liga | 2nd | Semifinalist | Semifinalist |
| 2022–23 | 1 | OK Liga | 1st | Champion | Champion |

=== Men's team ===
| Season | Tier | Division | Pos. |
|---|---|---|---|
| 2006–07 | 3 | Autonómica | 4th |
| 2007–08 | 3 | Autonómica | 3rd |
| 2008–09 | 3 | Autonómica | 3rd |
| 2009–10 | 3 | Autonómica | 3rd |
| 2010–11 | 3 | Autonómica | 6th |
| 2011–12 | 3 | Autonómica | 4th |
| 2012–13 | 3 | Autonómica | 1st |
| 2013–14 | 3 | Autonómica | 7th |
| 2014–15 | 3 | Autonómica | 3rd |
| 2015–16 | 3 | Autonómica | 5th |
| 2016–17 | 3 | Autonómica | 10th |
| 2017–18 | 3 | Autonómica | 7th |
| 2018–19 | 3 | Autonómica | 5th |

== Trophies ==
- Women's OK Liga: 5
  - 2009, 2017, 2018, 2023, 2025
- Copa de la Reina: 5
  - 2012, 2013, 2016, 2019, 2023
- Supercup: 2
  - 2022, 2023
- Ladies European League: 6
  - 2007, 2009, 2010, 2012, 2018, 2023
- Intercontinental Cup: 1
  - 2024
