= Bigues i Riells del Fai =

Bigues i Riells
- Municipality
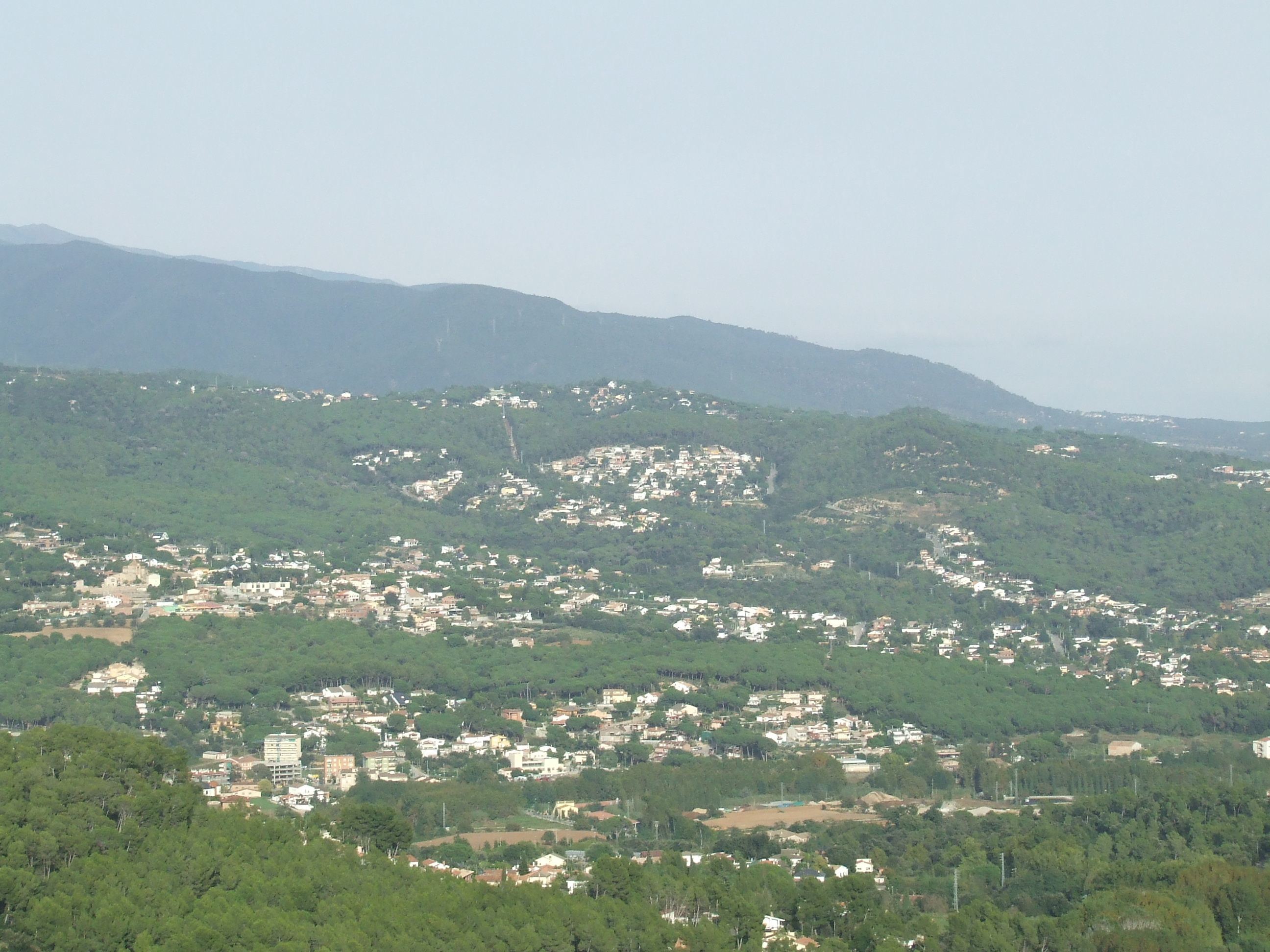
- Bigues

- Coat of arms

- Location in Catalonia Bigues i Riells (Spain)
- Coordinates: 41.675476°N 2.221298°E
- Country: Spain
- Community: Catalonia
- Province: Barcelona
- Comarca: Vallès Oriental

Government
  - Mayor: Joan Galiano Peralta (2015)

Area
  - Total: 28.6 km^{2} (11.0 sq mi)

Population (2025-01-01)
  - Total: 10,139
  - Density: 355/km^{2} (918/sq mi)
- Website: biguesiriells.cat

Bigues i Riells del Fai (Catalan pronunciation: [ˈbiɣəz i riˈeʎz ðəl ˈfaj]) is a village in the province of Barcelona and autonomous community of Catalonia, Spain. The municipality covers an area of 28.6 square kilometres (11.0 sq mi) and the population in 2014 was 8854.
