= ERG Iserlohn =

- Full name: Erste Rollhockey Gemeinschaft Iserlohn e.V.
- League: M: Roller Hockey Bundesliga; W: Frauen Bundesliga
- Founded: 13 January 1965; 60 years ago
- Home ground: Hembergsporthalle, Iserlohn, Germany (Capacity 1,200)

Erste Rollhockey Gemeinschaft Iserlohn e.V. is a Roller Hockey team from Iserlohn, Germany. Founded in 1965, both men's and women's team play in the Bundesliga.

== Trophies ==
=== Men's team ===
- Bundesliga: (9)
  - 1976, 1977, 1986, 2006, 2008, 2009, 2015, 2016, 2017
- German Cup: 5
  - 2004, 2005, 2009, 2011, 2012

=== Women's team ===
- Bundesliga: (7)
  - 2012, 2013, 2014, 2015, 2016, 2017, 2018
- German Cup: (5)
  - 2012, 2014, 2015, 2016, 2017
