= Palau-solità i Plegamans =

- Municipality
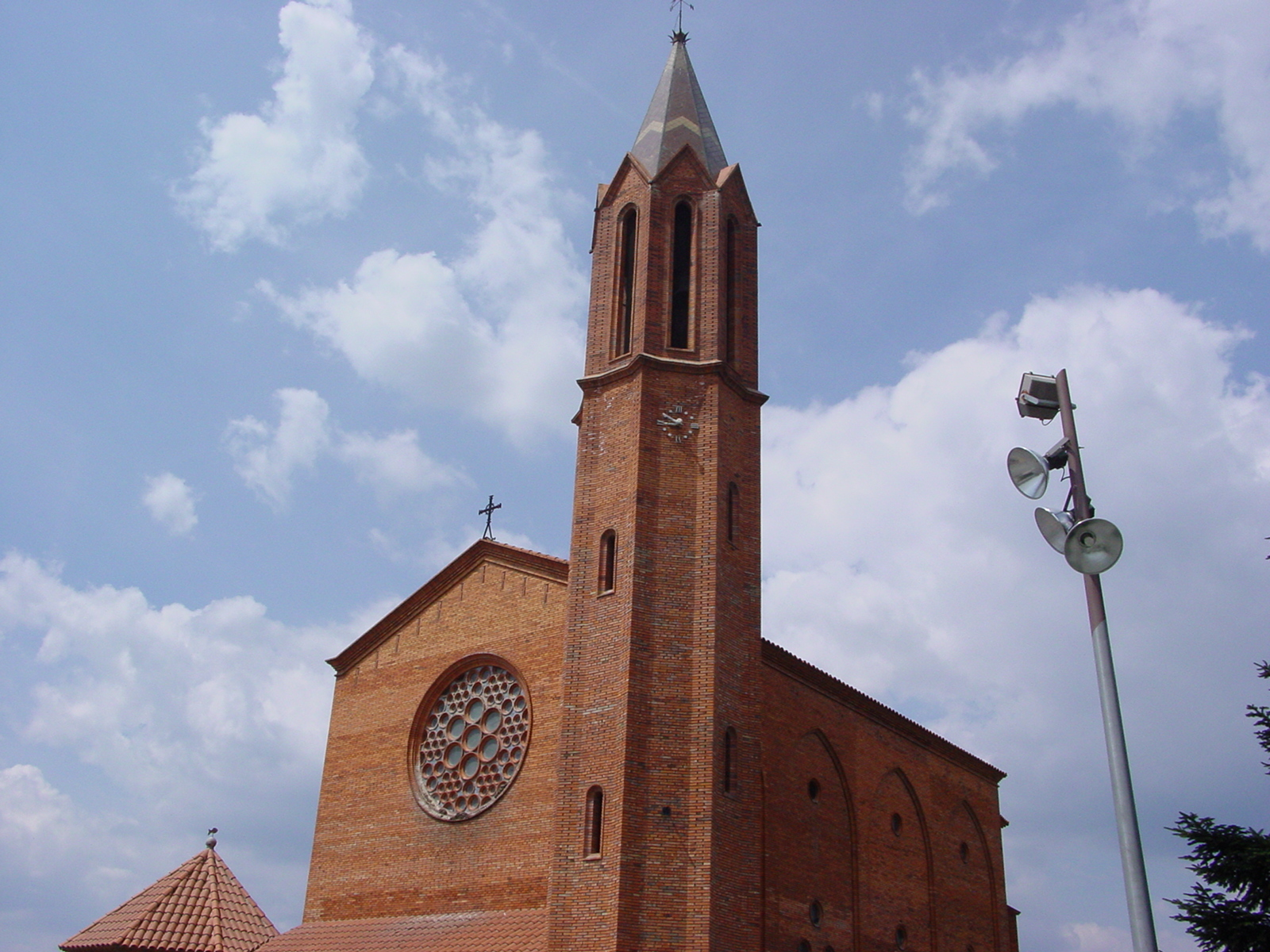

- Flag Coat of arms

- Location in Catalonia Palau-solità i Plegamans (Spain)
- Coordinates: 41°34′48″N 2°10′52″E
- Country: Spain
- Community: Catalonia
- Province: Barcelona
- Comarca: Vallès Occidental

Government
  - Mayor: Oriol Lozano Rocabruna (2019) (ERC)

Area
  - Total: 14.9 km^{2} (5.8 sq mi)
- Elevation: 140 m (460 ft)

Population (2025-01-01)
  - Total: 15,614
  - Density: 1,050/km^{2} (2,710/sq mi)
- Demonym: Palauenc
- Postal code: 08184
- Website: palauplegamans.cat

Palau-solità i Plegamans (Catalan pronunciation: [pəˌlaw‿suliˈta‿j ˌplɛɣəˈmans]) is a municipality and town in the comarca of Vallès Occidental, province of Barcelona, in the Spanish autonomous community of Catalonia. It lies approximately 15 km from Sabadell and Granollers and 25 km north of the city of Barcelona. The name results from the union of the former settlements of Palau-solità and Plegamans. Palau-solità i Plegamans is the location of the headquarters of the Mango fashion company.

== Broadcasting station ==
At Palau-solità i Plegamans there is a powerful medium wave transmitter of Radio Nacional de España. It transmits on 576 kHz the program of RNE-5 at 100 kW and on 738 kHz the program of RNE-1 at 500 kW. For both frequencies a single 217-metre guyed mast radiator is located at 41°33'32" N, 2°11'21"E.
