= Manlleu =

- Municipality
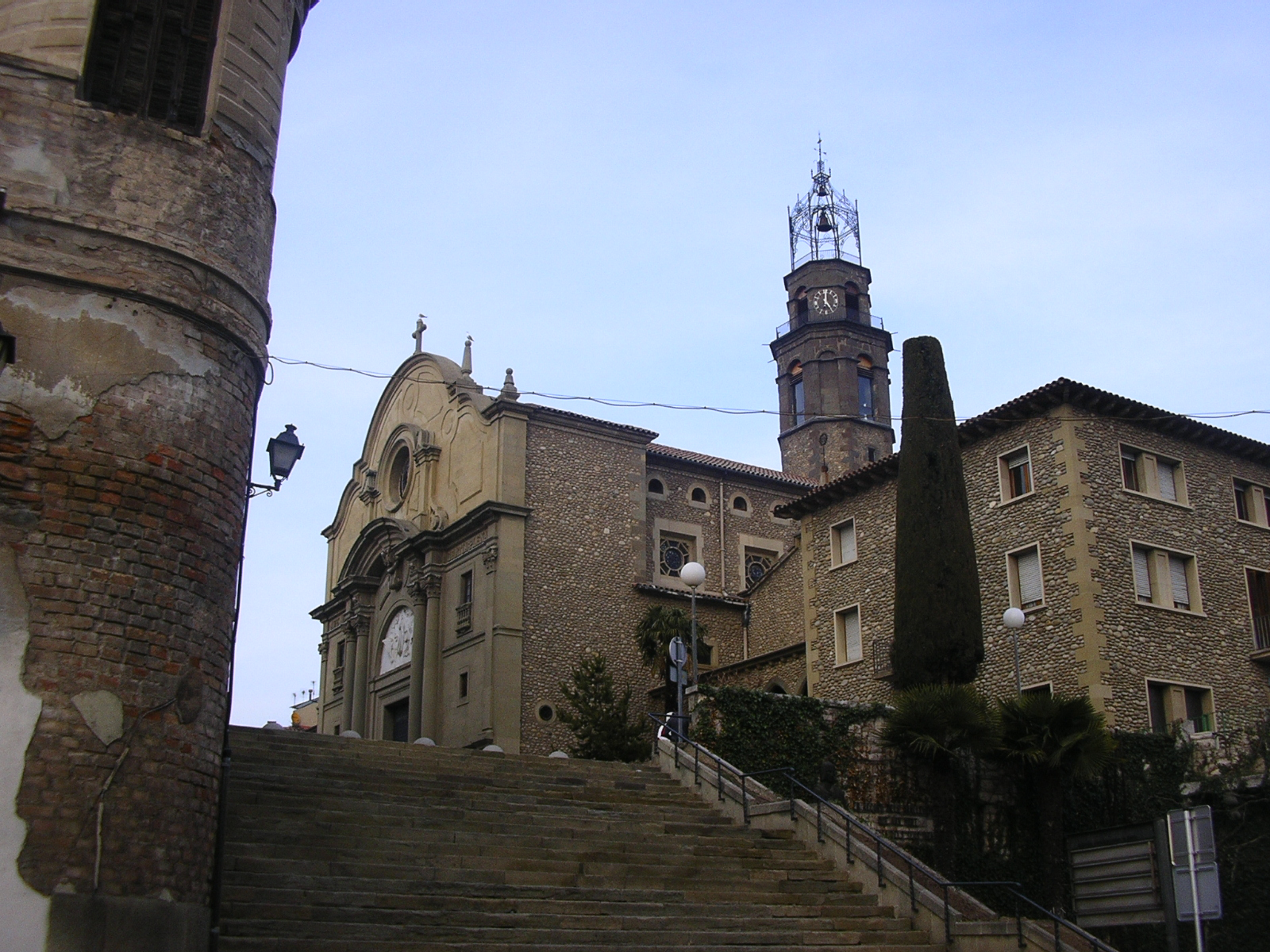
- Church of Santa Maria.

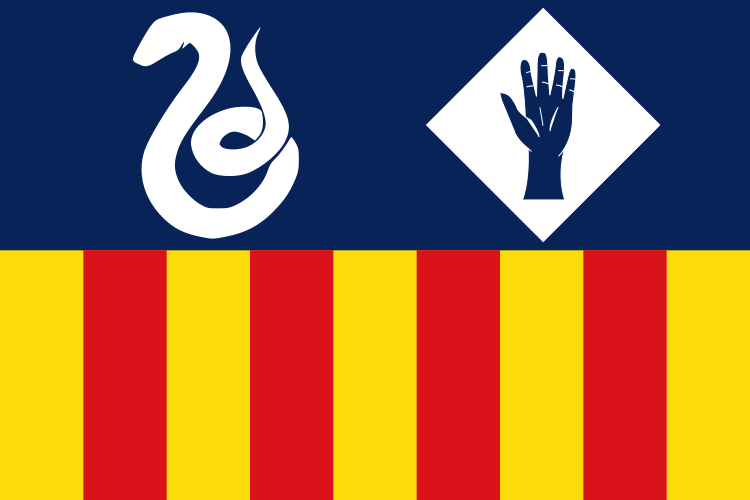
- Flag Coat of arms
- Interactive map of Manlleu
- Location within Catalonia Location within Spain
- Coordinates: 42°00′0″N 2°17′1″E
- Country: Spain
- Autonomous community: Catalonia
- Province: Barcelona
- Comarca: Osona

Government
  - Mayor: Alex Garrido Serra (2015)

Area
  - Total: 17.2 km^{2} (6.6 sq mi)
- Elevation: 461 m (1,512 ft)

Population (2025-01-01)
  - Total: 21,425
  - Density: 1,250/km^{2} (3,230/sq mi)
- Demonym: Manlleuenc
- Time zone: UTC+1 (CET)
  - Summer (DST): UTC+2 (CEST)
- Postal code: 08560
- Website: manlleu.cat

Manlleu (Catalan pronunciation: [məɲˈʎew]) is municipality in the comarca of Osona, in the province of Barcelona, Catalonia, northern Spain.

Manlleu is located in a large plain, La Plana de Vic, at around 460 metres above sea level on average. The highest point is Puig Agut church at around 594 m above the sea level. It is surrounded by mountains with heights over 1000 m.

The Ter River, which starts in the Pyrenees, snakes through Manlleu, and ends in the Mediterranean Sea, near Pals and the Illes Medes.

== Climate ==
The climate is cold in winter, maximum temperatures between 10 °C and 7 °C during the day and night temperatures between 0 °C and -8 °C, reaching -15 °C some winters. The absolute minimum record is about -22 °C in 1950s. Fog is common in autumn and winter and rain normally falls around October/November, but it becomes drier in December, January and February.

Spring is variable with rain and sun. Temperatures is around 5 °C/25 °C during the day but with cool/cold nights. Summers are warm and temperatures can reach around 35 °C/40 °C, although nights are cool with 12 °C/15 °C.

== Main sights ==
- The main square, Plaça Fra Bernadí.
- The "Passeig del Ter", a walkway next to the river Ter, running for approximately 1,5 km. It is lined by numerous varieties of trees, including poplars, plane trees, white poplar, blue Atlas cedar from the mountains of north Africa, weeping willows and common willow, lime trees, horse chestnut, evergreen oak, lime trees and a Chinese windmill palm among others.
- The church of Santa Maria, built of round river stones from the river Ter.
- Old buildings around the neighborhood of Dalt Vila and Baix Vila, the older parts of the town.
- The church/chapel of Sant Esteve de Vilacetrú and the Sanctuary of Puig Agut
- The dovecot building to control pigeons in an ethical way, on the "Passeig del Ter".
- The textile Industry Museum (Museu Industrial del Ter), located between the river Ter and the industrial canal.
- Old farmhouses in the countryside include Mas Corcó, Mas Bellfort and Mas la Rierola which offers rural tourism.

== Political ==
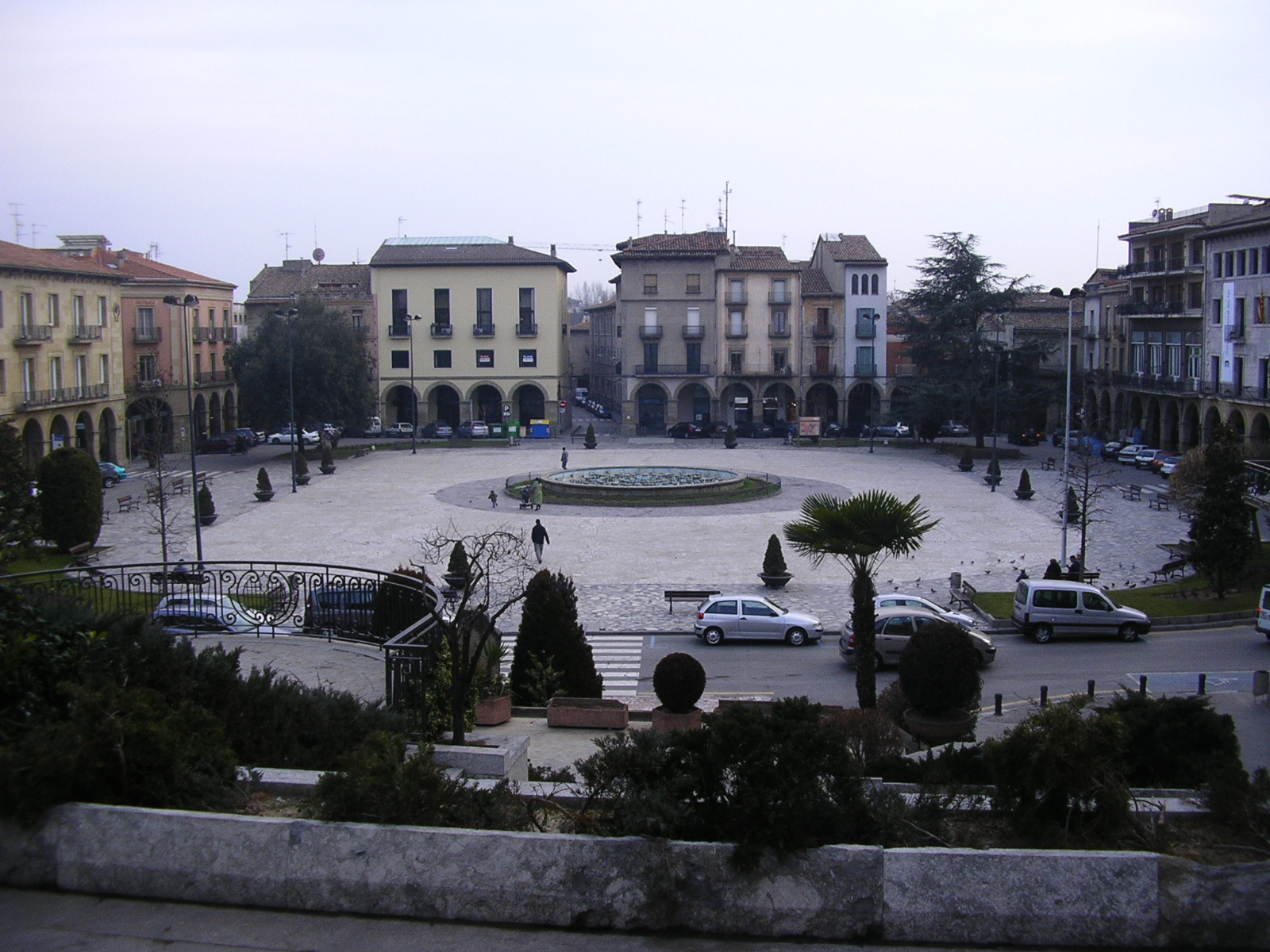
Manlleu, Plaza de Fra Bernardí

The mayor of Manlleu is Àlex Garrido i Serra. The government of Manlleu is coalition of ERC and Junts x Cat.

== Economy ==
Agriculture is active in Manlleu's neighborhood with numerous farms.
