= US Coutras =

French Roller Hockey team

Coutras
- Full name: Union Sportive de Coutras
- League: Nationale 1
- Founded: 1936
- Home ground: Patinoire Milou Ducourtioux, Coutras, France (Capacity 1,000)

Personnel
- Chairman: Claude Ducourtioux

Union Sportive de Coutras is a Roller Hockey team from Coutras, Aquitaine, France.

== History ==
Coutras was founded in 1936 and won 16 French titles.

The women's team won ten times the national championship and finished as runner-up of the 2014–15 CERH Women's European Cup.

== Trophies ==
- 16 French Championship
- 10 French Women's Championship
