= S.L. Benfica (roller hockey) =

Portuguese professional roller hockey team

Benfica
- Full name: Sport Lisboa e Benfica
- Nickname(s): As Águias (The Eagles); Os Encarnados (The Reds)
- League: First Division
- Founded: 19 August 1917; 109 years ago
- Home ground: Pavilhão Fidelidade (Capacity 2,400)

Personnel
- Coach: Eduard Castro
- Owner: S.L. Benfica
- Manager: Valter Neves
- Website: slbenfica.pt
Home	Away	Third

Sport Lisboa e Benfica (Portuguese pronunciation: [sɨˈpɔɾ liʒˈβoɐ i βɐ̃jˈfikɐ]), commonly known as Benfica, is a professional roller hockey team based in Lisbon, Portugal.

Founded in 1917, Benfica play in the Portuguese First Division, having won 25 league titles. Moreover, they have won 15 Portuguese Cups, ten Portuguese Super Cups, one 1947 Cup and three Elite Cup.

Internationally, Benfica have won, among other trophies, two WSE Champions League, two WSE Cup, three Continental Cup, two Intercontinental Cup, one CERH Ciudad de Vigo Tournament, one Nations Cup and one Golden Cup.

== History ==
=== First years ===
Benfica's roller hockey section was founded in 1917, making it one of the earliest roller hockey clubs in Portugal. The team achieved its first success in 1925–26, winning the Campeonato Regional de Lisboa, the top competition disputed at the time. Following this triumph, the club won the seven subsequent regional titles.

Benfica's first participation in the national First Division came in 1944–45, finishing fourth in their debut season.

=== National and international success ===
Benfica's first golden era came in the 1950s, winning four league titles (1950–51, '51–52, '55–56, '56–57), five Campeonatos Regionais de Lisboa (1950–51, '52–53, '53–54, '55–56, '58–59), and six Taças de Honra da APL (from 1951–52 to 1957–58). During the second half of the decade, Torcato Ferreira took charge as coach—a position he would hold until 1970.

Under Torcato Ferreira, with standout players like António Ramalhete and António Livramento, Benfica extended its dominance into the 1960s, winning six league titles (1959–60, '60–61, '62–63, '65–66, '66–67, '67–68), two Campeonatos Metropolitanos de Lisboa (1966–67, 1967–68) — a competition that served as an intermediate stage between the regional leagues and the national championship — the 1963–64 Taça de Portugal (the inaugural edition of the competition), eight Campeonatos Regionais de Lisboa (1959–60 to 1963–64 and 1965–66 to 1967–68), and six Torneios de Abertura da APL (1960–61 to 1963–64 and 1965–66 to 1967–68).

Internationally, Benfica reached its first continental finals, finishing runners-up in the 1961 Nations Cup, winning the 1962 Nations Cup, and later reaching the 1968–69 European Cup final, marking the club’s emergence on the European stage.

=== Mixed success ===
Benfica maintained its strong momentum in the early 1970s, winning three of the five league titles contested in that period (1969–70, '71–72, '73–74), along with four Campeonatos Metropolitanos de Lisboa (1969–70, '71–72, '72–73, '73–74), one Campeonato Regional de Lisboa (1969–70), and one Torneio de Abertura da APL (1971–72). Internationally, the team reached the 1972–73 European Cup final.

However, Benfica struggled to maintain the same level of dominance in the latter half of the decade, winning only the 1978–79 league title, two Taças de Portugal (1977–78, '78–79), and three Torneios de Abertura da APL (1974–75, '77–78, '78–79).

The 1980s brought a period of mixed domestic success, with Benfica winning two league titles (1979–80, '80–81), three Taças de Portugal (1979–80, '80–81, '81–82), and four Torneios de Abertura da APL (1979–80, '80–81, '81–82, '85–86). Internationally, the club reached three European finals — the 1979–80 European Cup and the 1982–83 and 1983–84 Cup Winners' Cup.

=== 1990s and decline ===
The 1990s saw Benfica return to dominance under key players such as José Carlos, Rui Lopes, Luís Ferreira, Paulo Almeida, and Vítor Fortunato, winning five league titles (1991–92, '93–94, '94–95, '96–97, '97–98), three Taças de Portugal (1990–91, '93–94, '94–95), four Supertaças António Livramento (1992–93, '94–95, '96–97, '97–98), and four Torneios de Abertura da APL (1989–90 to 1991–92 and 1994–95). In Europe, the club won its second continental title, the 1991 CERS Cup, and reached the 1992–93 and 1994–95 European Cup finals.

The 2000s marked a period of decline, with Benfica winning only three Taças de Portugal (1999–00 to 2001–02) and two Supertaças António Livramento (2001–02 and 2002–03), with Panchito Velázquez emerging as the team’s star player.

=== 2010s and revival ===
Benfica started the decade by winning the 2009–10 Taça de Portugal, ending a seven-year trophy drought. The bigger highlights, however, were the victories in the 2010–11 CERS Cup and the 2011–12 league title, which ended a 13-year league drought. During this three-year span, the club also won the 2010–11 Supertaça António Livramento and the 2011 Continental Cup.

The 2012–13 season saw Benfica win its first-ever WSE Champions League title, defeating FC Porto at Dragão Caixa by 6–5 (aet), in an all Portuguese final, along with the Supertaça António Livramento. In the following years, led by key players such as Carlos Nicolia, João Rodrigues, and others, the team captured several major trophies: the Supertaça António Livramento, Continental Cup defeating CE Vendrell, and Intercontinental Cup in 2013, defeating Sport Recife by 10–3 and winning the only missing trophy for the club and the second one for Portuguese roller hockey, after the 1993 Óquei de Barcelos win; the 2013–14 Taça de Portugal; the 2014–15 league title and Taça de Portugal; and the 2015–16 league title, without defeat, totalling 25 wins and one draw, and WSE Champions League, after beating Oliveirense in the final 5–3.

On 15 March 2015, Benfica became the second European club, after CP Voltregà, to win CERH's most important club title in both men and women competitions, after defeating the French team Coutras in the final of the Women's European Cup. Domestically, earlier that season, the women's section had conquered the national Super Cup on 8 November 2014, and later also won their third consecutive national championship on 8 June 2015, and their second consecutive domestic cup on 14 June, accomplishing the treble, and winning all five competitions they played, including the Torneio de Abertura.

Benfica closed the decade by adding the 2017 Continental Cup, beating Óquei de Barcelos (9–2) in the second leg of the Continental Cup, and won the trophy for a third time, and the 2018 Intercontinental Cup, beating Reus Deportiu (3–5), thus becoming the second team with most trophies in the competition.

=== Recent years ===
In the first three years of the 2020s, Benfica only won the 1947 Cup in 2020. In the following seasons, the team regained momentum, winning the 2022–23 league title, two Supertaças António Livramento (2022–23 and 2023–24), and three Elite Cups (2022–23, 2023–24, 2024–25).

== Season to Season ==
As of 25 April 2026

=== Key ===
- The Campeonato Metropolitano qualified for the national league.

Season	Pos	Playoffs	Cup	Super Cup	European competitions		Other competitions	
Season	League		Cup	Super Cup	Competition	Result	Competition	Result
1917–18	—	—	—	—	—	—	—	—
1918–19	—	—	—	—	—	—	—	—
1920–21	—	—	—	—	—	—	Campeonato Regional de Lisboa	2nd
1921–22	—	—	—	—	—	—	Campeonato Regional de Lisboa	2nd
1922–23	—	—	—	—	—	—	Campeonato Regional de Lisboa	2nd
1923–24	—	—	—	—	—	—	—	—
1924–25	—	—	—	—	—	—	—	—
1925–26	—	—	—	—	—	—	Campeonato Regional de Lisboa	1st
1926–27	—	—	—	—	—	—	Campeonato Regional de Lisboa	1st
1927–28	—	—	—	—	—	—	Campeonato Regional de Lisboa	1st
1928–29	—	—	—	—	—	—	Campeonato Regional de Lisboa	1st
1929–30	—	—	—	—	—	—	Campeonato Regional de Lisboa	1st
1930–31	—	—	—	—	—	—	Campeonato Regional de Lisboa	1st
1931–32	—	—	—	—	—	—	Campeonato Regional de Lisboa	1st
1932–33	—	—	—	—	—	—	Campeonato Regional de Lisboa	1st
1933–34	—	—	—	—	—	—	—	—
1934–35	—	—	—	—	—	—	Campeonato Regional de Lisboa	1st
1935–36	—	—	—	—	—	—	Campeonato Regional de Lisboa	3rd
1936–37	—	—	—	—	—	—	Campeonato Regional de Lisboa Taça de Honra da APL	2nd W
1937–38	—	—	—	—	—	—	Campeonato Regional de Lisboa	1st
1938–39	—	—	—	—	—	—	Campeonato Regional de Lisboa Taça de Honra da APL	2nd W
1939–40	—	—	—	—	—	—	Campeonato Regional de Lisboa	4th
1940–41	—	—	—	—	—	—	Campeonato Regional de Lisboa	3rd
1941–42	—	—	—	—	—	—	Campeonato Regional de Lisboa	4th
1942–43	—	—	—	—	—	—	Campeonato Regional de Lisboa	4th
1943–44	—	—	—	—	—	—	Campeonato Regional de Lisboa	3rd
1944–45	4th	—	—	—	—	—	Campeonato Regional de Lisboa	3rd
1945–46	—	—	—	—	—	—	Campeonato Regional de Lisboa	3rd
1946–47	—	—	—	—	—	—	Campeonato Regional de Lisboa	7th
1947–48	—	—	—	—	—	—	Campeonato Regional de Lisboa	6th
1948–49	3rd	—	—	—	—	—	Campeonato Regional de Lisboa	3rd
1949–50	3rd	—	—	—	—	—	Campeonato Regional de Lisboa	3rd
1950–51	1st	—	—	—	—	—	Campeonato Regional de Lisboa	1st
1951–52	1st	—	—	—	—	—	Campeonato Regional de Lisboa Taça de Honra da APL	2nd W
1952–53	4th	—	—	—	—	—	Campeonato Regional de Lisboa Taça de Honra da APL	1st W
1953–54	2nd	—	—	—	—	—	Campeonato Regional de Lisboa Taça de Honra da APL	1st W
1954–55	2nd	—	—	—	—	—	Campeonato Regional de Lisboa Taça de Honra da APL	2nd W
1955–56	1st	—	—	—	—	—	Campeonato Regional de Lisboa Taça de Honra da APL	1st W
1956–57	1st	—	—	—	—	—	Campeonato Regional de Lisboa Taça de Honra da APL	2nd W
1957–58	2nd	—	—	—	—	—	Campeonato Regional de Lisboa Taça de Honra da APL	4th W
1958–59	4th	—	—	—	—	—	Campeonato Regional de Lisboa	1st
1959–60	2nd	W	—	—	—	—	Campeonato Regional de Lisboa	1st
1960–61	1st	—	—	—	Nations Cup	RU	Campeonato Regional de Lisboa Torneio de Abertura da APL	1st W
1961–62	2nd	—	—	—	Nations Cup	W	Campeonato Regional de Lisboa Torneio de Abertura da APL	1st W
1962–63	—	—	W	—	—	—	Campeonato Regional de Lisboa Torneio de Abertura da APL	1st W
1963–64	2nd	—	RU	—	—	—	Campeonato Regional de Lisboa Torneio de Abertura da APL	1st W
1964–65	4th	—	—	—	—	—	Torneio de Abertura da APL	—
1965–66	1st	—	—	—	—	—	Campeonato Regional de Lisboa Torneio de Abertura da APL	1st W
1966–67	1st	—	—	—	—	—	Campeonato Regional de Lisboa Campeonato Metropolitano	1st 1st
1967–68	1st	—	—	—	European Cup	QF	Campeonato Regional de Lisboa Campeonato Metropolitano Torneio de Abertura da APL	1st 1st 1st
1968–69	—	—	—	—	European Cup	RU	Campeonato Regional de Lisboa	4th
1969–70	1st	—	—	—	—	—	Campeonato Regional de Lisboa Campeonato Metropolitano Torneio de Abertura da APL	1st 1st 3rd
1970–71	3rd (1st Phase)	—	—	—	European Cup	SF	Campeonato Metropolitano	3rd
1971–72	1st	—	—	—	—	—	Campeonato Metropolitano Torneio de Abertura da APL	1st 1st
1972–73	2nd	—	—	—	European Cup	RU	Campeonato Metropolitano	1st
1973–74	1st	—	—	—	—	—	Campeonato Metropolitano	1st
1974–75	7th (1st Phase)	—	—	—	European Cup	SF	Torneio de Abertura da APL	1st
1975–76	7th	—	R32	—	—	—	—	—
1976–77	6th	—	R32	—	—	—	—	—
1977–78	4th	—	W	—	—	—	Torneio de Abertura da APL	1st
1978–79	1st	—	W	—	Cup Winners's Cup	QF	Torneio de Abertura da APL	1st
1979–80	1st	—	W	—	European Cup	RU	Torneio de Abertura da APL	1st
1980–81	1st	—	W	—	European Cup	QF	Torneio de Abertura da APL	1st
1981–82	2nd	—	W	—	European Cup	SF	Torneio de Abertura da APL	1st
1982–83	3rd	—	RU	RU	Cup Winner's Cup	RU	—	—
1983–84	4th	—	SF	RU	Cup Winner's Cup	RU	—	—
1984–85	5th	—	—	—	European Cup	QF	—	—
1985–86	4th	—	RU	RU	CERS Cup	QF	Torneio de Abertura da APL	1st
1986–87	4th	SF	R32	RU	European Cup	R16	—	—
1987–88	5th	—	SF	—	CERS Cup	R16	—	—
1988–89	3rd	—	QF	—	CERS Cup	QF	—	—
1989–90	3rd	—	SF	—	CERS Cup	SF	Torneio de Abertura da APL	1st
1990–91	3rd	—	W	—	CERS Cup	W	Torneio de Abertura da APL	1st
1991–92	1st	—	SF	RU	Cup Winner's Cup	QF	Torneio de Abertura da APL	1st
1992–93	2nd	—	RU	W	European Cup	RU	—	—
1993–94	1st	—	W	RU	Cup Winner's Cup	QF	—	—
1994–95	1st	—	W	W	European Cup	RU	Torneio de Abertura da APL	1st
1995–96	2nd	—	SF	—	European Cup	SF	—	—
1996–97	1st	—	1R	W	Champions League	1R	—	—
1997–98	1st	—	RU	W	Champions League	2R	—	—
1998–99	3rd	—	R16	RU	Champions League	GS	—	—
1999–00	3rd	—	W	—	Champions League	4th	—	—
2000–01	2nd	—	W	RU	Champions League	4th	—	—
2001–02	2nd	—	W	W	Champions League	SF	—	—
2002–03	3rd	—	RU	W	Champions League	GS	—	—
2003–04	7th	—	QF	—	Champions League	GS	—	—
2004–05	7th	—	RU	—	CERS Cup	QF	—	—
2005–06	2nd	—	SF	RU	Champions League	2R	—	—
2006–07	2nd	RU	R32	—	—	—	—	—
2007–08	2nd	RU	QF	—	—	—	—	—
2008–09	3rd	—	RU	—	—	—	—	—
2009–10	5th	—	W	RU	CERS Cup	SF	—	—
2010–11	2nd	—	QF	W	CERS Cup	W	—	—
2011–12	1st	—	RU	—	Champions League	QF	Continental Cup	W
2012–13	2nd	—	QF	W	Champions League	W	—	—
2013–14	2nd	—	W	W	Champions League	SF	Continental Cup Intercontinental Cup	W W
2014–15	1st	—	W	RU	Champions League	QF	—	—
2015–16	1st	—	RU	RU	Champions League	W	—	—
2016–17	2nd	—	SF	RU	Champions League	SF	Continental Cup	W
2017–18	2nd	—	QF	—	Champions League	QF	Intercontinental Cup	W
2018–19	4th	—	RU	—	Champions League	SF	—	—
2019–20	N/A	—	N/A	—	Champions League	N/A	—	—
2020–21	4th	SF	N/A	—	Champions League	SF	1947 Cup	W
2021–22	3rd	RU	RU	—	—	—	Elite Cup	QF
2022–23	1st	W	R16	W	Champions League	QF	Elite Cup	RU
2023–24	2nd	RU	SF	W	Champions League	QF	Elite Cup	W
2024–25	1st	SF	SF	—	Champions League	SF	Elite Cup	W
2025–26	1st	W	SF	—	Champions League	—	Elite Cup	W

== Results in international competition ==
Season	Competition	Round	Opposition	Score	Aggregate
1960–61	Nations Cup	Regular Season	(Netherlands) HRC Hollandia	3–3 (N)	—
1960–61	Nations Cup	Regular Season	(Belgium) C.P. Antwerp	9–1 (N)	—
1960–61	Nations Cup	Regular Season	(Switzerland) Montreux HC	3–4 (N)	—
1960–61	Nations Cup	Final Round	(Spain) CP Voltregà	2–4 (N)	—
1960–61	Nations Cup	Final Round	(Italy) Amatori Modena	8–6 (N)	—
1960–61	Nations Cup	Final Round	(Switzerland) Montreux HC	5–3 (N)	—
1961–62	Nations Cup	Regular Season	(Italy) HRC Monza	10–2 (N)	—
1961–62	Nations Cup	Regular Season	(France) SCRA Saint Ome	6–1 (N)	—
1961–62	Nations Cup	Regular Season	(Germany) SpVgg Herten	4–1 (N)	—
1961–62	Nations Cup	Final Round	England	3–2 (N)	—
1961–62	Nations Cup	Final Round	(Italy) HRC Monza	3–1 (N)	—
1961–62	Nations Cup	Final Round	(Switzerland) Montreux HC	3–0 (N)	—
1967–68	European Cup	1R	(Spain) CH Mataró	4–3 (H); 3–1 (A)	5–6
1968–69	European Cup	QF	(France) Coutras	5–9 (A); 7–2 (A)	16–7
1968–69	European Cup	SF	(Spain) Vilanova	1–0 (H); 2–2 (A)	3–2
1968–69	European Cup	Final	(Spain) Reus Deportiu	7–1 (A); 3–0 (H)	4–7
1970–71	European Cup	QF	(Spain) CP Voltregà	8–5 (H); 8–5 (A) (3–0 g.p.)	13–13
1970–71	European Cup	SF	(Spain) Reus Deportiu	8–4 (A); 3–4 (H)	7–12
1972–73	European Cup	QF	(Wales) Walsum	8–3 (H); 1–5 (A)	13–4
1972–73	European Cup	SF	(Spain) Reus Deportiu	2–5 (A); 2–2 (H)	7–4
1972–73	European Cup	Final	(Spain) FC Barcelona	5–3 (A); 7–7 (H)	10–12
1974–75	European Cup	QF	(Wales) Walsum	8–0 (H); 4–3 (A)	11–4
1974–75	European Cup	SF	(Spain) CP Voltregà	3–7 (H); 15–7 (A)	10–22
1978–79	Cup Winner's Cup	QF	(Portugal) AD Oeiras	3–1 (A); 6–4 (H)	7–7 (a)
1979–80	European Cup	R16	(Italy) Hockey Breganze	0–2 (A); 1–2 (H)	3–2
1979–80	European Cup	QF	(France) La Vendéenne	13–1 (H); 3–7 (A)	20–4
1979–80	European Cup	SF	(Germany) Lichtstad	3–5 (A); 3–3 (H)	6–8
1979–80	European Cup	Final	(Spain) FC Barcelona	5–2 (A); 3–6 (H)	5–11
1980–81	European Cup	QF	(Spain) FC Barcelona	3–2 (H); 10–5 (A)	8–12
1981–82	European Cup	QF	(Belgium) Royal Sunday´s Club	0–4 (A); 15–4 (A)	19–4
1981–82	European Cup	SF	(Spain) FC Barcelona	11–2 (A); 4–2 (H)	6–13
1982–83	Cup Winner's Cup	QF	(France) SHC Fontenay	15–4 (H); 3–9 (A)	24–7
1982–83	Cup Winner's Cup	SF	(Netherlands) RC Den Haag	9–2 (H); 2–3 (A)	12–4
1982–83	Cup Winner's Cup	Final	(Portugal) FC Porto	2–2 (A); 5–5 (H) (5–6 g.p.)	7–7
1983–84	Cup Winner's Cup	QF	(Belgium) Kurink HC	2–8 (A); 21–1 (H)	24–7
1983–84	Cup Winner's Cup	SF	(Italy) AFP Giovinazzo	3–6 (A); 14–1 (H)	20–4
1983–84	Cup Winner's Cup	Final	(Spain) Reus Deportiu	6–4 (A); 4–5 (H)	8–11
1984–85	European Cup	R16	(Italy) Amatori Lodi	9–3 (H); 8–14 (A)	23–11
1984–85	European Cup	QF	(Spain) CP Voltregà	10–4 (H); 11–4 (A)	14–15
1985–86	CERS Cup	QF	(Italy) Hockey Bassano	8–6 (A); 4–6 (H)	10–14
1986–87	European Cup	R16	(Portugal) FC Porto	13–1 (A); 3–3 (H)	4–16
1987–88	CERS Cup	QF	(Italy) Amatori Vercelli	6–1 (H); 11–2 (A)	8–12
1988–89	CERS Cup	R16	(Switzerland) Genève RHC	9–4 (H); 3–5 (A)	14–7
1988–89	CERS Cup	QF	(Spain) Igualada	4–0 (H); 8–3 (A)	7–8
1989–90	CERS Cup	R16	(Germany) Cronenberg	6–1 (H); 3–11 (A)	17–4
1989–90	CERS Cup	QF	(Spain) Reus Deportiu	8–5 (H); 3–3 (A)	11–8
1989–90	CERS Cup	SF	(Spain) FC Barcelona	10–4 (A); 7–1 (H)	11–11 (a)
1990–91	CERS Cup	R16	(France) US Coutras	24–2 (H); 2–24 (A)	48–4
1990–91	CERS Cup	QF	(Portugal) Oliveirense	10–2 (H); 7–0 (A)	10–9
1990–91	CERS Cup	SF	(Italy) HC Valdagno	3–5 (A); 5–5 (H)	10–8
1990–91	CERS Cup	Final	(Spain) Reus Deportiu	6–4 (A); 10–3 (H)	14–9
1991–92	Cup Winner's Cup	R16	(Italy) HRC Monza	6–6 (H); 5–1 (A)	7–11
1991–92	Ciudad de Vigo Tournament	SF	(Spain) HC Liceo	6–9 (N)	—
1991–92	Ciudad de Vigo Tournament	Third Place	(Portugal) Sporting CP	10–1 (N)	—
1992–93	European Cup	QF	(Italy) HRC Monza	6–3 (H); 1–2 (A)	8–4
1992–93	European Cup	SF	(Spain) HC Liceo	3–3 (A); 5–4 (H)	8–7
1992–93	European Cup	Final	(Spain) Igualada	4–1 (A); 3–8 (H)	4–12
1993–94	Cup Winner's Cup	QF	(Italy) Amatori Lodi	6–4 (H); 8–2 (A)	8–12
1994–95	European Cup	QF	(Spain) FC Barcelona	5–0 (A); 8–1 (H)	8–6
1994–95	European Cup	SF	(Italy) Hockey Novara	5–1 (H); 6–5 (A)	10–7
1994–95	European Cup	Final	(Spain) Igualada	4–3 (H); 3–1 (A)	5–6
1995–96	European Cup	QF	(France) Nantes ARH	5–8 (A); 21–2 (H)	29–7
1995–96	European Cup	SF	(Italy) FC Barcelona	3–3 (H); 4–1 (A)	4–7
1997–98	Champions League	1R	(France) ROC Vaulx en Velin	10–2 (H); 4–7 (A)	17–6
1997–98	Champions League	2R	(Spain) HC Liceo	2–2 (A); 2–2 (H) (0-2 g.p)	4–4 (a)
1998–99	Champions League	2R	(Netherlands) Valkenswaardse RC	19–2 (H); 1–11 (A)	30–2
1998–99	Champions League	Group Stage	(Portugal) FC Porto	4–5 (H)	—
1998–99	Champions League	Group Stage	(Portugal) Paço d'Arcos	5–4 (A)	—
1998–99	Champions League	Group Stage	(Spain) Igualada	3–1 (H)	—
1998–99	Champions League	Group Stage	(Portugal) FC Porto	3–1 (A)	—
1998–99	Champions League	Group Stage	(Portugal) Paço d'Arcos	9–5 (H)	—
1998–99	Champions League	Group Stage	(Spain) Igualada	6–3 (A)	—
1998–99	Ciudad de Vigo Tournament	SF	(Spain) Igualada	2–4 (N)	—
1998–99	Ciudad de Vigo Tournament	Third Place	(Spain) HC Liceo	1–2 (N)	—
1999–00	Champions League	2R	(France) SCRA Saint Omer	8–0 (H); 4–11 (A)	19–4
1999–00	Champions League	Group Stage	(Italy) Hockey Novara	4–4 (A)	—
1999–00	Champions League	Group Stage	(Portugal) OC Barcelos	4–3 (H)	—
1999–00	Champions League	Group Stage	(Spain) Igualada	0–2 (A)	—
1999–00	Champions League	Group Stage	(Italy) Hockey Novara	2–3 (H)	—
1999–00	Champions League	Group Stage	(Portugal) OC Barcelos	1–4 (A)	—
1999–00	Champions League	Group Stage	(Spain) Igualada	3–1 (H)	—
1999–00	Champions League	SF	(Portugal) FC Porto	1–4 (N)	—
2000–01	Champions League	2R	(Switzerland) Genève RHC	2–7 (A); 8–2 (H)	15–4
2000–01	Champions League	Group Stage	(Spain) Igualada	2–0 (H)	—
2000–01	Champions League	Group Stage	(Portugal) OC Barcelos	4–1 (A)	—
2000–01	Champions League	Group Stage	(Portugal) FC Porto	5–5 (A)	—
2000–01	Champions League	Group Stage	(Spain) Igualada	3–3 (A)	—
2000–01	Champions League	Group Stage	(Portugal) OC Barcelos	4–7 (A)	—
2000–01	Champions League	Group Stage	(Portugal) FC Porto	7–4 (H)	—
2000–01	Champions League	SF	(Spain) HC Liceo	3–3 (N) (0-1 g.p.)	—
2001–02	Champions League	2R	(Netherlands) Valkenswaardse RC	36–1 (H); 3–22 (A)	58–4
2001–02	Champions League	Group Stage	(Spain) Reus Deportiu	7–1 (H)	—
2001–02	Champions League	Group Stage	(France) HC Quévert	2–7 (A)	—
2001–02	Champions League	Group Stage	(Italy) Hockey Novara	5–5 (H)	—
2001–02	Champions League	Group Stage	(Spain) Reus Deportiu	5–4 (A)	—
2001–02	Champions League	Group Stage	(France) HC Quévert	8–3 (H)	—
2001–02	Champions League	Group Stage	(Italy) Hockey Novara	3–1 (H)	—
2001–02	Champions League	SF	(Spain) FC Barcelona	2–2 (N) (0-2 g.p.)	—
2002–03	Champions League	2R	(Switzerland) Genève RHC	10–1 (H); 1–3 (A)	13–2
2002–03	Champions League	Group Stage	(Spain) FC Barcelona	6–1 (A)	—
2002–03	Champions League	Group Stage	(Italy) Hockey Novara	2–1 (H)	—
2002–03	Champions League	Group Stage	(Italy) Prato	4–1 (A)	—
2002–03	Champions League	Group Stage	(Spain) FC Barcelona	1–4 (H)	—
2002–03	Champions League	Group Stage	(Italy) Hockey Novara	1–4 (A)	—
2002–03	Champions League	Group Stage	(Italy) Prato	6–7 (H)	—
2003–04	Champions League	2R	(Switzerland) La Vendéenne	6–3 (H); 1–1 (A)	7–4
2003–04	Champions League	Group Stage	(Portugal) FC Porto	3–2 (A)	—
2003–04	Champions League	Group Stage	(Spain) CP Vic	3–5 (H)	—
2003–04	Champions League	Group Stage	(Italy) Prato	7–6 (A)	—
2003–04	Champions League	Group Stage	(Portugal) FC Porto	0–4 (H)	—
2003–04	Champions League	Group Stage	(Spain) CP Vic	4–1 (A)	—
2003–04	Champions League	Group Stage	(Italy) Prato	3–7 (H)	—
2005–06	Champions League	2R	(Spain) CP Vic	2–2 (H); 4–2 (A)	4–6
2008–09	Ciudad de Vigo	QF	(Italy) ASD Hockey Follonica	3–2 (N)	—
2008–09	Ciudad de Vigo	SF	(Spain) HC Liceo	3–2 (N)	—
2008–09	Ciudad de Vigo	Final	(Spain) AJ Viana	5–1 (N)	—
2009–10	CERS Cup	1R	(England) Grismby	23–1 (H); 1–23 (A)	46–2
2009–10	CERS Cup	R16	(Italy) Roller Bassano	3–4 (A); 5–0 (H)	9–3
2009–10	CERS Cup	QF	(Spain) Vilanova	2–3 (A); 3–3 (H)	6–5
2009–10	CERS Cup	SF	(Spain) Pati Blanes	2–3 (N)	—
2010–11	CERS Cup	R16	(Italy) Amatori Lodi	7–4 (H); 7–5 (A)	12–11
2010–11	CERS Cup	QF	(Spain) CH Lloret	6–0 (H); 3–6 (A)	12–3
2010–11	CERS Cup	SF	(Portugal) AE Fisica	4–1 (N)	—
2010–11	CERS Cup	Final	(Spain) Vilanova	6–4 (N)	—
2011	Continental Cup	Final	(Spain) HC Liceo	10–0 (N)	—
2011–12	WSE Champions League	Group Stage	(Germany) ERG Iserlohn	8–2 (H)	—
2011–12	WSE Champions League	Group Stage	(Spain) CP Vic	4–4 (A)	—
2011–12	WSE Champions League	Group Stage	(Italy) Amatori Lodi	8–5 (A)	—
2011–12	WSE Champions League	Group Stage	(Italy) Amatori Lodi	8–0 (H)	—
2011–12	WSE Champions League	Group Stage	(Germany) ERG Iserlohn	2–8 (A)	—
2011–12	WSE Champions League	Group Stage	(Spain) CP Vic	5–1 (H)	—
2011–12	WSE Champions League	QF	(Italy) HC Valdagno	5–11 (N)	—
2012–13	WSE Champions League	Group Stage	(Spain) Reus Deportiu	7–1 (H)	—
2012–13	WSE Champions League	Group Stage	(Wales) Cronenberg	3–5 (A)	—
2012–13	WSE Champions League	Group Stage	(Italy) Viareggio	4–4 (H)	—
2012–13	WSE Champions League	Group Stage	(Italy) Viareggio	2–4 (A)	—
2012–13	WSE Champions League	Group Stage	(Spain) Reus Deportiu	4–3 (A)	—
2012–13	WSE Champions League	Group Stage	(Wales) Cronenberg	12–3 (H)	—
2012–13	WSE Champions League	QF	(Spain) CE Noia	3–3 (A); 7–0 (H)	10–3
2012–13	WSE Champions League	SF	(Spain) FC Barcelona	4–4 (N) (2–1 g.p.)	—
2012–13	WSE Champions League	Final	(Portugal) FC Porto	6–5 (N) (a.e.t)	—
2013	Continental Cup	Final	(Spain) CE Vendrell	3–5 (A); 5–0 (H)	10–3
2013	Intercontinental Cup	Final	(Brazil) Sport Recife	10–3 (N)	—
2013–14	WSE Champions League	Group Stage	(Switzerland) RHC Diessbach	13–3 (H)	—
2013–14	WSE Champions League	Group Stage	(France) HC Quévert	4–5 (A)	—
2013–14	WSE Champions League	Group Stage	(Spain) CE Vendrell	3–6 (A)	—
2013–14	WSE Champions League	Group Stage	(Spain) CE Vendrell	1–3 (H)	—
2013–14	WSE Champions League	Group Stage	(Switzerland) RHC Diessbach	2–11 (A)	—
2013–14	WSE Champions League	Group Stage	(France) HC Quévert	7–5 (H)	—
2013–14	WSE Champions League	QF	(Spain) Reus Deportiu	5–2 (A); 5–1 (H)	7–3
2013–14	WSE Champions League	SF	(Spain) FC Barcelona	2–3 (N)	—
2014–15	WSE Champions League	Group Stage	(Spain) FC Barcelona	1–1 (A)	—
2014–15	WSE Champions League	Group Stage	(Italy) Hockey Bassano	7–3 (H)	—
2014–15	WSE Champions League	Group Stage	(France) HC Quévert	5–9 (A)	—
2014–15	WSE Champions League	Group Stage	(France) HC Quévert	5–2 (H)	—
2014–15	WSE Champions League	Group Stage	(Spain) FC Barcelona	1–3 (H)	—
2014–15	WSE Champions League	Group Stage	(Italy) Hockey Bassano	6–8 (A)	—
2014–15	WSE Champions League	QF	(Portugal) FC Porto	3–3 (H); 3–2 (A)	5–6
2015–16	WSE Champions League	Group Stage	(Spain) CP Vic	5–1 (H)	—
2015–16	WSE Champions League	Group Stage	(France) SA Merignac	2–5 (A)	—
2015–16	WSE Champions League	Group Stage	(Italy) Hockey Bassano	2–8 (A)	—
2015–16	WSE Champions League	Group Stage	(Italy) Hockey Bassano	9–6 (H)	—
2015–16	WSE Champions League	Group Stage	(Spain) CP Vic	7–6 (A)	—
2015–16	WSE Champions League	Group Stage	(France) SA Merignac	8–0 (A)	—
2015–16	WSE Champions League	QF	(Spain) CE Vendrell	3–5 (A); 5–5 (H)	10–8
2015–16	WSE Champions League	SF	(Spain) FC Barcelona	1–1 (N) (2–1 g.p.)	10–8
2015–16	WSE Champions League	Final	(Portugal) Oliveirense	5–3	—
2016	Continental Cup	Final	(Portugal) OC Barcelos	5–4 (A); 9–2 (H)	13–7
2016–17	WSE Champions League	Group Stage	(Spain) CP Vic	3–2 (H)	—
2016–17	WSE Champions League	Group Stage	(Switzerland) RHC Diessbach	3–4 (A)	—
2016–17	WSE Champions League	Group Stage	(Italy) Amatori Lodi	6–7 (A)	—
2016–17	WSE Champions League	Group Stage	(Italy) Amatori Lodi	7–3 (H)	—
2016–17	WSE Champions League	Group Stage	(Spain) CP Vic	4–4 (A)	—
2016–17	WSE Champions League	Group Stage	(Switzerland) RHC Diessbach	12–2 (H)	—
2016–17	WSE Champions League	QF	(Spain) HC Liceo	2–3 (A); 6–2 (H)	9–4
2016–17	WSE Champions League	SF	(Spain) Reus Deportiu	5–6 (N)	—
2017–18	WSE Champions League	Group Stage	(Switzerland) Montreux HC	14–2 (H)	—
2017–18	WSE Champions League	Group Stage	(Italy) Forte Dei Marmi	1–1 (A)	—
2017–18	WSE Champions League	Group Stage	(Spain) FC Barcelona	4–8 (H)	—
2017–18	WSE Champions League	Group Stage	(Spain) FC Barcelona	2–0 (A)	—
2017–18	WSE Champions League	Group Stage	(Switzerland) Montreux HC	4–11 (A)	—
2017–18	WSE Champions League	Group Stage	(Italy) Forte Dei Marmi	6–4 (H)	—
2017–18	WSE Champions League	QF	(Portugal) FC Porto	3–2 (H); 9–2 (A)	5–11
2018–19	WSE Champions League	Group Stage	(Italy) HRC Monza	3–1 (H)	—
2018–19	WSE Champions League	Group Stage	(Switzerland) Montreux HC	3–8 (A)	—
2018–19	WSE Champions League	Group Stage	(Spain) CE Noia	1–2 (A)	—
2018–19	WSE Champions League	Group Stage	(Spain) CE Noia	4–4 (H)	—
2018–19	WSE Champions League	Group Stage	(Italy) HRC Monza	0–5 (A)	—
2018–19	WSE Champions League	Group Stage	(Switzerland) Montreux HC	10–2 (H)	—
2018–19	WSE Champions League	QF	(Portugal) Oliveirense	2–3 (A); 3–1 (H)	6–3
2018–19	WSE Champions League	SF	(Portugal) Sporting CP	4–5 (N)	—
2019–20	WSE Champions League	Group Stage	(Germany) SK Herringen	14–0 (H)	—
2019–20	WSE Champions League	Group Stage	(Italy) Hockey Sarzana	2–7 (A)	—
2019–20	WSE Champions League	Group Stage	(Spain) FC Barcelona	2–4 (H)	—
2019–20	WSE Champions League	Group Stage	(Spain) FC Barcelona	5–5 (A)	—
2019–20	WSE Champions League	Group Stage	(Germany) SK Herringen	3–4 (A)	—
2019–20	WSE Champions League	Group Stage	(Italy) Hockey Sarzana	Not played	—
2020–21	WSE Champions League	Group Stage	(Spain) HC Liceo	2–7 (A)	—
2020–21	WSE Champions League	Group Stage	FC Barcelona	6–2 (H)	—
2020–21	WSE Champions League	SF	(Portugal) Sporting CP	5–5 (N) (1–2 g.p.)	—
2022–23	WSE Champions League	Group Stage	(Spain) CP Calafell	5–3 (H)	—
2022–23	WSE Champions League	Group Stage	(Spain) HC Liceo	3–3 (A)	—
2022–23	WSE Champions League	Group Stage	(Portugal) Oliveirense	2–5 (A)	—
2022–23	WSE Champions League	Group Stage	(Portugal) Oliveirense	5–2 (H)	—
2022–23	WSE Champions League	Group Stage	(Spain) HC Liceo	2–2 (H)	—
2022–23	WSE Champions League	Group Stage	(Spain) CP Calafell	2–2 (A)	—
2022–23	WSE Champions League	QF	(Portugal) FC Porto	2–4 (N)	—
2023–24	WSE Champions League	Group Stage	(Spain) CP Calafell	3–2 (H)	—
2023–24	WSE Champions League	Group Stage	(Spain) Reus Deportiu	4–2 (H)	—
2023–24	WSE Champions League	Group Stage	(Portugal) Sporting CP	7–6 (A)	—
2023–24	WSE Champions League	Group Stage	(Spain) Reus Deportiu	3–6 (A)	—
2023–24	WSE Champions League	Group Stage	(Portugal) Sporting CP	3–1 (H)	—
2023–24	WSE Champions League	Group Stage	(Spain) CP Calafell	3–0 (H)	—
2023–24	WSE Champions League	QF	(Portugal) OC Barcelos	4–2 (A); 1–5 (H)	3–9
2024–25	WSE Champions League	Group Stage	(Portugal) AD Valongo	5–0 (H)	—
2024–25	WSE Champions League	Group Stage	(France) HC Quévert	0–5 (A)	—
2024–25	WSE Champions League	Group Stage	(Italy) GSH Trissino	3–6 (A)	—
2024–25	WSE Champions League	Group Stage	(Portugal) Oliveirense	3–1 (H)	—
2024–25	WSE Champions League	Group Stage	(Spain) HC Liceo	0–0 (A)	—
2024–25	WSE Champions League	Group Stage	(Spain) HC Liceo	5–1 (H)	—
2024–25	WSE Champions League	Group Stage	(Portugal) Oliveirense	1–5 (A)	—
2024–25	WSE Champions League	Group Stage	(Italy) GSH Trissino	7–5 (H)	—
2024–25	WSE Champions League	Group Stage	(France) HC Quévert	6–2 (H)	—
2024–25	WSE Champions League	Group Stage	(Portugal) AD Valongo	1–3 (A)	—
2024–25	WSE Champions League	QF	(Spain) Reus Deportiu	1–2 (A); 5–2 (H)	7–3
2024–25	WSE Champions League	SF	(Portugal) FC Porto	2–3 (a.e.t) (N)	—
2025–26	WSE Champions League	Group Stage			
2025–26	WSE Champions League	Group Stage	(Italy) Hockey Bassano	4–2 (H)	—
2025–26	WSE Champions League	Group Stage	(Portugal) U.D. Oliveirense	3–2 (A)	—
2025–26	WSE Champions League	Group Stage	(Portugal) OC Barcelos	6–1 (H)	—
2025–26	WSE Champions League	Group Stage	(Portugal) Sporting	4–1 (A)	—
2025–26	WSE Champions League	Group Stage	(Spain) HC Liceo	4–2 (H)	—
2025–26	WSE Champions League	Group Stage	(Spain) HC Liceo	4–4 (A)	—
2025–26	WSE Champions League	Group Stage	(Portugal) Sporting	4–1 (A)	—
2025–26	WSE Champions League	Group Stage	(Portugal) OC Barcelos	5–1 (A)	—
2025–26	WSE Champions League	Group Stage	(Portugal) U.D. Oliveirense	3–1 (H)	—
2025–26	WSE Champions League	Group Stage	(Italy) Hockey Bassano	4–2 (A)	—
2025–26	WSE Champions League	QF	(Spain) Reus Deportiu	2–2 (2–1 pen.) (N)	—
2025–26	WSE Champions League	SF	(Portugal) Barcelona	3–4 (N)	—

== Current squad ==
As of 2 November 2026

Goalkeepers
- 01 (Portugal) Pedro Henriques
- 97 (Argentina) Conti Acevedo

Defenders

- 03 (Portugal) Zé Miranda
- 05 (Portugal) Miguel Matias
- 06 (France) Roberto Di Benedetto
- 24 (Spain) Nil Roca

Forwards

- 04 (Portugal) Viti
- 10 (Portugal) Martim Costa
- 08 (Spain) Pau Bargalló
- 09 (Portugal) João Rodrigues
- 71 (Portugal) Gonçalo Pinto

== Men's technical staff ==
Position	Name
Head coach	Eduard Castro
Assistant coach	Jordi Rocca
Physiologist	Daniel Fernandéz
Physiotherapist	Diana Alves
Team Manager	Valter Neves

== Honours ==
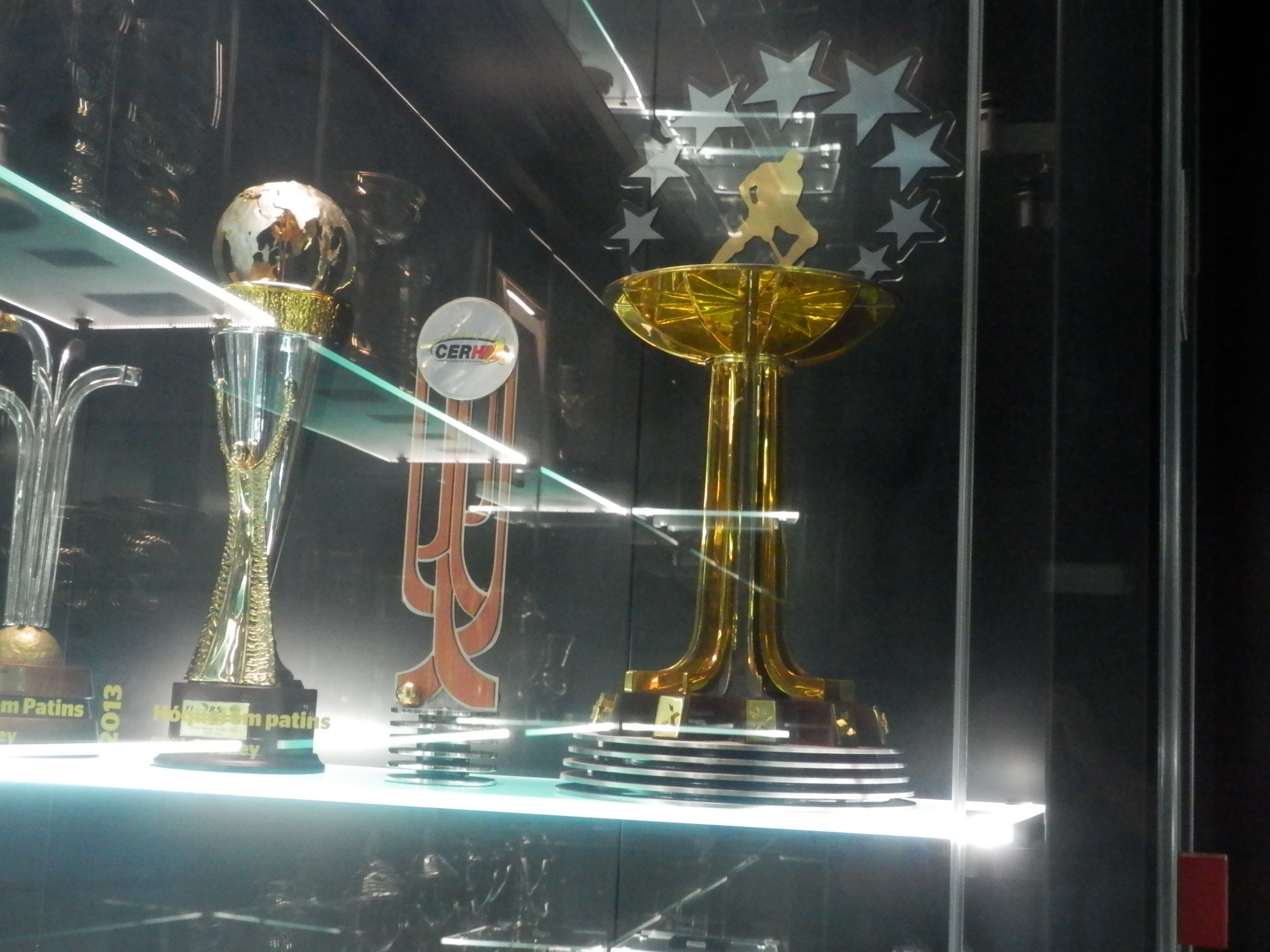
2012–13 CERH European League trophy (right) at the Museu Benfica

According to Benfica's official website

Type	Competition	Titles	Seasons
Domestic	Primeira Divisão	25	1950–51, 1951–52, 1955–56, 1956–57, 1959–60, 1960–61, 1965–66, 1966–67, 1967–68, 1969–70, 1971–72, 1973–74, 1978–79, 1979–80, 1980–81, 1991–92, 1993–94, 1994–95, 1996–97, 1997–98, 2011–12, 2014–15, 2015–16, 2022–23, 2025–26
Domestic	Campeonato Metropolitano	5	1966–67, 1967–68, 1969–70, 1971–72, 1972–73
Domestic	Taça de Portugal	15	1962–63, 1977–78, 1978–79, 1979–80, 1980–81, 1981–82, 1990–91, 1993–94, 1994–95, 1999–2000, 2000–01, 2001–02, 2009–10, 2013–14, 2014–15
Domestic	Elite Cup	3	2023–24, 2024–25, 2025–26
Domestic	1947 Cup	1	2020
Domestic	Supertaça	10	1993, 1995, 1997, 2001, 2002, 2010, 2012, 2022, 2023, 2026
Continental	WSE Champions League	2	2012–13, 2015–16
Continental	World Skate Europe Cup	2	1990–91, 2010–11
Continental	Continental Cup	3	2011, 2013, 2016
Continental	Nations Cup	1	1962
Continental	CERH Ciudad de Vigo Tournament	1	2008
Continental	Golden Cup	1	2022
World	Intercontinental Cup	2	2013, 2017

- record
- ^{s} shared record

== Women's current squad ==
As of 7 October 2025

Goalkeepers
- 01 (France) Lili Buchoux
- 10 (Portugal) Maria Vieira

Defenders/Midfielders

- 07 (Portugal) Rita Batista
- 23 (Portugal) Sofia Moncóvio
- 85 (Portugal) Leonor Coelho
- 95 (Portugal) Raquel Santos

Forwards

- 02 (Portugal) Marlene Sousa
- 13 (Spain) Aimée Blackman
- 44 (Portugal) Inês Severino
- 66 (Portugal) Maria Silva

== Women's honours ==
Type	Competition	Titles	Seasons
Domestic	Portuguese League	13	2012–13, 2013–14, 2014–15, 2015–16, 2016–17, 2017–18, 2018–19, 2020–21, 2021–22, 2022–23, 2023-24, 2024-25, 2025-26
Domestic	Portuguese Cup	12	2013–14, 2014–15, 2015–16, 2016–17, 2017–18, 2018–19, 2020–21, 2021–22, 2022–23, 2023-24, 2024-25, 2025-26
Domestic	Portuguese Super Cup	13	2013, 2014, 2015, 2016, 2017, 2018, 2019, 2021, 2022, 2023, 2024, 2025, 2026
Domestic	Elite Cup	5	2022, 2023, 2024, 2025, 2026
Continental	WSE Women's Champions League	1	2014–15

- record
- ^{s} shared record
