= Francisco Velázquez =

Personal information
- Full name: Francisco Cecílio Velázquez
- Nickname: Panchito
- Born: 10 January 1975 (age 51) San Juan, Argentina
- Years active: 1991–2005, 2010–2011
- Height: 1.70 m (5 ft 7 in)
- Other interests: Agriculture, football

Sport
- Country: Argentina
- Sport: Roller hockey
- Team: Social San Juan (1991); Follonica (1992–1993); Estudiantil (1993); Social San Juan (1993); Follonica (1993–1994); Estudiantil (1994-1995); Social SJ (1996); Voltregà (1996–1997); Barcelona (1997–1998); Estudiantil (1999); Concepción (1999); Benfica (2000–2003); Voltregà (2003–2004); Social San Juan (2005); Voltregà (2005); Sindicato (2010); 1º de Agosto (2010); Sindicato (2011)

Francisco Cecílio Velázquez (born 10 January 1975), nicknamed Panchito, is an Argentine retired roller hockey player. As a forward, he is remembered as one of the greatest roller hockey players, being often compared to his idol António Livramento and called "the Maradona of hockey" by his fans.

== Playing career ==
Velázquez started playing roller hockey at the age of 4 in Club Atlético Social San Juan as a goalkeeper, following the footsteps of his father, a former goalkeeper of Argentina between 1966 and 1974. By the age of 16 he reached the first division of Argentine hockey. As a senior, he played in his hometown for Social San Juan, Deportivo Union Estudiantil, Concepción Patín Club and Sindicato Empleados de Comercio, in Angola for Primeiro de Agosto, in Italy for Follonica, in Spain for Voltregà and FC Barcelona, in Portugal for Benfica. The last time he represented Argentina was at the 2005 World Championship, as a captain. On 19 February 2010, after four years and a half without practicing and training, the 35 years old Panchito returned to competitive hockey for the Torneo Apertura de San Juan but only for one year so that his children, Francisco and Nazarena, could watch him playing and to put an end to his career at Sindicato, a club where he was later joined by his younger brother Mariano Ernesto Velazquez who had left Follonica.

== Benfica ==
Velázquez expressed his affection for Benfica in several interviews by stating that he became a fan of the Portuguese club, calling it a religion and naming his farm "Las Marys" to "La Gloriosa" in allusion to the club's nickname O Glorioso. Panchito also said that would be a dream to see his son playing for Benfica with "his" number 7. He and his brother joined Benfica in 2000 and played there together until 2003.

== Honours ==
=== Club ===
Estudiantil

- Roller Hockey South American Club Championship: 1993, 1994

Barcelona

- CERH Continental Cup: 1997
- FIRS Intercontinental Cup: 1998
- OK Liga: 1997–98
- Lliga Catalana: 1997–98

Concepción

- Roller Hockey South American Club Championship: 1999

Benfica

- Portuguese Cup: 1999–2000, 2000–01, 2001–02
- Portuguese Supercup: 2001–02, 2002–03

Sindicato Empleados de Comercio

- Torneo Apertura de San Juan: 2010

=== Country ===
Argentina

- Nations Cup: 1993
- World Championship – A: 1995
- Roller Hockey Pan American Games: 1995
