= CERH Ciudad de Vigo Tournament =

- Founded: 1983
- Abolished: 2008
- Region: Europe (CERH)
- Last champions: (Portugal) SL Benfica (1st title)
- Most championships: (Spain) HC Liceo La Coruña (13 titles)
- Website: CERH Official Website

The Ciudad de Vigo Tournament was a roller hockey competition organized by the Comité Européen de Rink-Hockey, living since 1983 until 2008 through 25 editions.

== Format ==
The competition was composed by 4 teams, placed into 2 semi-final games, with the winners going on to play the final and the losers to play the 3rd/4th place playoff. Only the last edition was composed by 8 teams, thus placed into 4 quarter-final games (with the losers playing 2nd to 8th place play-offs). Only the editions organized since 1999 were considered official.

== Finals ==
Year	Winner	Score	Runner-up
1983	(Spain) HC Liceo La Coruña	6–2	(Spain) AA Dominicos
1984	Spain	4–2	(Spain) AA Dominicos
1985	(Spain) HC Liceo La Coruña	5–4	
1986	(Spain) HC Liceo La Coruña	7–2	(Spain) AA Dominicos
1987	(Spain) HC Liceo La Coruña	9–3	(Portugal) UD Oliveirense
1988	(Spain) HC Liceo La Coruña	5–4	(Italy) Roller Monza
1989	(Spain) HC Liceo La Coruña	5–3	(Italy) Hockey Novara
1990	(Spain) HC Liceo La Coruña	9–4	(Portugal) FC Porto
1991	(Portugal) OC Barcelos	4–3	(Spain) HC Liceo La Coruña
1992	(Spain) HC Liceo La Coruña	7–3	(Italy) Roller Monza
1993	(Spain) HC Liceo La Coruña	4–3	(Spain) Igualada HC
1994	(Spain) HC Liceo La Coruña	4–1	(Spain) Igualada HC
1995	(Spain) Igualada HC	4–2	(Spain) HC Liceo La Coruña
1996	(Spain) FC Barcelona	1–0	(Spain) Igualada HC
1997	(Spain) FC Barcelona	7–0	(Spain) HC Liceo La Coruña
1998	(Italy) HC Amatori Vercelli	2–2 (PSO)	(Spain) Igualada HC
2000	(Spain) FC Barcelona	2–0	(Portugal) CD Paço d'Arcos
2001	(Spain) FC Barcelona	4–1	(Spain) HC Liceo La Coruña
2002	(Spain) HC Liceo La Coruña	6–4	(Spain) FC Barcelona
2003	(Spain) Igualada HC	5–3	(Spain) FC Barcelona
2004	(Spain) FC Barcelona	3–2	(Spain) Vigo Stick CH
2005	(Spain) HC Liceo La Coruña	4–3	(Spain) Vigo Stick CH
2006	(Spain) HC Liceo La Coruña	4–3	(Italy) Follonica Hockey
2007	(Spain) FC Barcelona	4–2	(Italy) Bassano Hockey
2008	(Portugal) SL Benfica	5–1	(Portugal) Juventude de Viana

- The tournament was not disputed in 1999.

== Performances ==
=== By team ===
Team	Won	Runner-up	Years won	Years runner-up
(Spain) HC Liceo La Coruña	13	4	1983, 1985, 1986, 1987, 1988, 1989, 1990, 1992, 1993, 1994, 2002, 2005, 2006	1991, 1995, 1997, 2001
(Spain) FC Barcelona	6	2	1996, 1997, 2000, 2001, 2004, 2007	2002, 2003
(Spain) Igualada HC	2	4	1995, 2003	1993, 1994, 1996, 1998
(Portugal) SL Benfica	1	0	2008	N/A
(Portugal) OC Barcelos	1	0	1991	N/A
(Italy) HC Amatori Vercelli	1	0	1998	N/A
Spain	1	0	1984	N/A
(Spain) AA Dominicos	0	3	N/A	1983, 1984, 1986
(Spain) Vigo Stick CH	0	2	N/A	2004, 2005
Ruan	0	1	N/A	1985
(Portugal) UD Oliveirense	0	1	N/A	1987
(Italy) Roller Monza	0	1	N/A	1988
(Italy) Hockey Novara	0	1	N/A	1989
(Portugal) FC Porto	0	1	N/A	1990
(Italy) HC Monza	0	1	N/A	1992
(Portugal) CD Paço d'Arcos	0	1	N/A	2000
(Italy) Follonica Hockey	0	1	N/A	2006
(Italy) Bassano Hockey	0	1	N/A	2007
(Portugal) Juventude de Viana	0	1	N/A	2008

=== By country ===
Country	Wins	Runners-up	Winners	Runners-up
Spain	22	15	HC Liceo La Coruña (13), FC Barcelona (6), Igualada HC (2), Spain (1)	HC Liceo La Coruña (4), Igualada HC (4), AA Dominicos (3), FC Barcelona (2), Vigo Stick CH (2)
Portugal	2	4	SL Benfica (1), OC Barcelos (1)	Juventude de Viana (1), CD Paço d'Arcos (1), FC Porto (1), UD Oliveirense (1)
Italy	1	5	HC Amatori Vercelli (1)	Bassano Hockey (1), Follonica Hockey (1), HC Monza (1), Hockey Novara (1), Roller Monza (1)
Other	0	1	N/A	Ruan (1)
