= António Livramento =

Portuguese roller hockey player and coach (1943–1999)

ComIH António Livramento
Personal information
- Full name: António José Parreira do Livramento
- Nationality: Portuguese
- Born: 28 February 1943 Évora, Portugal
- Died: 7 June 1999 (aged 56) Lisbon, Portugal
- Years active: 1959–1970, 1971–1981

Sport
- Country: Portugal
- Sport: Roller hockey
- Team: Benfica (1959–1969); HC Monza (1969–1971); Benfica (1971–1974); Banco Pinto & Sotto Mayor (1974–1976); Sporting CP (1976–1977); Amatori Lodi (1977–78); Sporting CP (1978–1980)

António José Parreira do Livramento ComIH (28 February 1943 – 7 June 1999) was a Portuguese roller hockey player and coach. A forward, he is revered as one of the sport's greatest players, and by some as the greatest ever.

== Playing career ==
Born in Évora, Livramento first started to play football, when he was invited to play roller hockey at Futebol Benfica in 1959, as he did. He represented Benfica, from 1959–60 to 1969–70, and after a year absent, from 1971–72 to 1973–74, Banco Pinto & Sotto Mayor, from 1974–75 to 1975–76, Sporting CP in 1976–77, Amatori Lodi, in Italy, in 1977–78, and another period for Sporting CP, from 1978–79 to 1980–81. He started to play at the youth category of Portugal in 1960, being considered the best player at the Youth Rink Hockey European Championship. He soon was called for the main team, winning the Rink Hockey European Championship, in 1961, and the Rink Hockey World Championship, the following year. During his long career, Livramento was capped 209 times, scoring 425 goals, from 1961 to 1977. The sad incident with a Spanish player at the 1977 Rink Hockey Championship final, led him to leave the national team. Livramento won 3 Rink Hockey World Championship, in 1962, 1968 and 1974, and 7 Rink Hockey European Championship, in 1961, 1963, 1965, 1967, 1973, 1975 and 1977.

== Coaching career ==
After ending his playing career, Livramento started a coach career. He was the coach of Bassano Hockey 54, in Italy, from 1984–85 to 1985–86. He would be also the coach of Sporting CP and the Portugal national team, winning 2 World Championships, in 1982 and 1993, and 3 European Championships, in 1987, 1992 and 1994. He resigned after the unsuccessful presence at the 1995 World Championship.

== Death ==
Livramento died in Lisbon, Portugal, on 7 June 1999 from a stroke at the age of 56.

== Honours ==
Orders

- Commander of the Order of Prince Henry

=== Club ===
Benfica

- Portuguese First Division: 1959-60, 1960-61, 1965-66, 1966-67, 1967-68, 1971-72, 1973-74
- Portuguese Cup: 1962-63
- Nations Cup: 1962

HC Monza

- Coppa Italia: 1970-71

Sporting CP

- Portuguese First Division: 1976-1977
- Portuguese Cup: 1976-77
- European Cup: 1976-77

Amatori Lodi

- Coppa Italia: 1977-78

=== Country ===
Portugal

- Nations Cup: 1963, 1965, 1968, 1970, 1973
- World Championship – A: 1962, 1968, 1974
- European Championship: 1961, 1963, 1965, 1967, 1973, 1975, 1977

=== Club ===
Sporting

- Portuguese First Division: 1981-82, 1987-88
- Portuguese Cup: 1983-84
- Portuguese Super Cup: 1982
- CERH Cup Winners' Cup: 1980-81
- CERS Cup: 1983-84

Porto

- Portuguese First Division: 1998-99
- Portuguese Cup: 1998-99
- Portuguese Super Cup: 1998

=== Country ===
Portugal

- Nations Cup: 1984, 1987, 1994
- World Championship – A: 1982, 1993
- European Championship: 1987, 1992, 1994
- World Games: 1993
