= Supertaça António Livramento =

Portuguese roller hockey tournament

The Supertaça António Livramento, also known as Supertaça Portuguesa de Hóquei em Patins (English: Portuguese Roller Hockey Super Cup), is an annual club roller hockey super cup match organised by the Portuguese Roller Sports Federation. Named after former player and coach António Livramento, it is played between the reigning domestic champions and cup winners.

== Winners ==
| Year | Winners | Runners-up | Result |
|---|---|---|---|
| 2026 | Benfica | Sporting CP | 3–2 |
| 2025 | Sporting CP | Porto | 4–3 |
| 2024 | OC Barcelos | Porto | 3–2 |
| 2023 | Benfica | SC Tomar | 4–1 |
| 2022 | Benfica | Porto | 4–2 |
| 2019 | Porto | UD Oliveirense | 6–4 |
| 2018 | Porto | Sporting CP | 4–1 |
| 2017 | Porto | SC Tomar | 7–3 |
| 2016 | Porto | Benfica | 13–7 |
| 2015 | Sporting CP | Benfica | 4–2 |
| 2014 | AD Valongo | Benfica | 7–5 |
| 2013 | Porto | UD Oliveirense | 5–4 |
| 2012 | Benfica | UD Oliveirense | 9–5 |
| 2011 | Porto | UD Oliveirense | 4–1 |
| 2010 | Benfica | Porto | 8–4 |
| 2009 | Porto | Benfica | 6–4 |
| 2008 | Porto | HC Braga | 6–2 |
| 2007 | Porto | HA Cambra | 5–1 |
| 2006 | Porto | Juventude de Viana | 4–2 |
| 2005 | Porto | Benfica | 2–2 / 5–2 |
| 2004 | OC Barcelos | Porto | 3–6 / 6–3 (2–1 g.p.) |
| 2003 | OC Barcelos | Porto | 2–2 / 3–1 |
| 2002 | Benfica | Porto | 2–2 / 12–4 |
| 2001 | Benfica | OC Barcelos | 1–0 / 2–2 |
| 2000 | Porto | Benfica | 2–2 / 5–4 |
| 1999 | OC Barcelos | Porto | 6–3 / 8–6 |
| 1998 | Porto | Benfica | 6–6 (8–6 a.e.t.) |
| 1997 | Benfica | UD Oliveirense | 1–1 / 4–1 |
| 1996 | Porto | OC Barcelos | OC Barcelos withdrew |
| 1995 | Benfica | Sporting CP | 13–4 / 4–0 |
| 1994 | OC Barcelos | Benfica | 5–3 / 6–3 |
| 1993 | Benfica | OC Barcelos | 3–0 / 5–5 |
| 1992 | Porto | Benfica | 9–4 / 2–6 |
| 1991 | Porto | Sporting CP | 8–3 / 4–6 |
| 1990 | Porto | CD Paço d'Arcos | 7–2 / 3–7 |
| 1989 | Porto | Sporting CP | 5–2 / 10–7 |
| 1988 | Porto | UD Oliveirense | 6–0 / 3–7 |
| 1987 | Porto | Benfica | 7–4 / 5–7 |
| 1986 | Porto | AD Sanjoanense | 2–5 / 8–3 |
| 1985 | Porto | Sporting CP | Sporting withdrew |
| 1984 | Porto | Benfica | 6–8 / 7–2 |
| 1983 | Sporting CP | Benfica | 3–4 / 6–2 |

== Performance by club ==
| Team | Won | Runners-up | Years won | Years runners-up |
|---|---|---|---|---|
| Porto | 23 | 8 | 1984, 1985, 1986, 1987, 1988, 1989, 1990, 1991, 1992, 1996, 1998, 2000, 2005, 2006, 2007, 2008, 2009, 2011, 2013, 2016, 2017, 2018, 2019 | 1999, 2002, 2003, 2004, 2010, 2022, 2024, 2025 |
| Benfica | 9 | 12 | 1993, 1995, 1997, 2001, 2002, 2010, 2012, 2022, 2023 | 1983, 1984, 1987, 1992, 1994, 1998, 2000, 2005, 2009, 2014, 2015, 2016 |
| OC Barcelos | 5 | 3 | 1994, 1999, 2003, 2004, 2024 | 1993, 1996, 2001 |
| Sporting CP | 3 | 5 | 1983, 2015, 2025 | 1985, 1989, 1991, 1995, 2018 |
| AD Valongo | 1 | 0 | 2014 | – |
| UD Oliveirense | 0 | 6 | – | 1988, 1997, 2011, 2012, 2013, 2019 |
| SC Tomar | 0 | 2 | – | 2017, 2023 |
| AD Sanjoanense | 0 | 1 | – | 1986 |
| CD Paço d'Arcos | 0 | 1 | – | 1990 |
| Juventude de Viana | 0 | 1 | – | 2006 |
| HA Cambra | 0 | 1 | – | 2007 |
| HC Braga | 0 | 1 | – | 2008 |
