= 2017 CERH Continental Cup =

Tournament details
- Dates: 14–15 October 2017
- Teams: 4 (from 3 associations)

Final positions
- Champions: (Portugal) Oliveirense (1st title)
- Runners-up: (Spain) Reus Deportiu

Tournament statistics
- Matches played: 3
- Goals scored: 20 (6.67 per match)

The 2017 CERH Continental Cup was the 37th season of the CERH Continental Cup, Europe's roller hockey Super Cup, organized by CERH.

Four teams from three federations played for the title on 14 and 15 October 2017 in Viareggio, Italy.

Portuguese club Oliveirense achieved their first title ever.

== Format ==
On 16 May 2017, the CERH announced the new format of the competition, that would be played by the two finalists of the previous editions of the two main European competitions: the CERH European League and the CERS Cup.

== Teams ==
Team	Qualified as	Appearance
(Spain) Reus Deportiu	CERH European League champion	5th
(Portugal) Oliveirense	CERH European League runner-up	2nd
(Portugal) Barcelos	CERS Cup champion	2nd
(Italy) Viareggio	CERS Cup runner-up	1st

== Bracket ==
Semi-finals
14 October
(Portugal) Barcelos	2
(Portugal) Oliveirense (a.e.t.)	4
14 October
(Spain) Reus Deportiu	2
(Italy) Viareggio	1

Final
15 October
(Portugal) Oliveirense	7
(Spain) Reus Deportiu	4
