= 2011 CERS Cup Final Four =

2011 CERS CUP
Tournament details
- Host country: Spain
- Dates: 7–8 May
- Teams: 4 (from 1 confederation)
- Venue(s): Pavelló Municipal Poliesportiu del Garraf (in 1 host city)

Final positions
- Champions: (Portugal) Benfica (2nd title)
- Runners-up: (Spain) CP Vilanova

Tournament statistics
- Matches played: 3

The 2011 CERS Cup Final Four was the 31st edition of the CERS Cup organized by CERH. It was held in May 2011 in Vilanova i la Geltru, within Barcelona metropolitan area, Spain.

After the qualification the four final clubs which participated in the final four were: SL Benfica, CP Vilanova, HC Braga and AE Física. The winner was Sport Lisboa e Benfica.

== Matches ==
7 May
15:00

SL Benfica	4–1	AE Física
	CERH Report of Benfica vs Fisica

Pavelló Municipal Poliesportiu del Garraf
7 May
17:00

HC Braga	3–5	CP Vilanova
	CERH Report of Braga vs Vilanova

Pavelló Municipal Poliesportiu del Garraf

== Final ==
8 May
15:00

CP Vilanova	4–6	SL Benfica
	CERH Report of Vilanova vs Benfica

Pavelló Municipal Poliesportiu del Garraf

Benfica
2nd Title
