= Intercontinental Cup =

Intercontinental Cup may refer to:

== Association football ==
- FIFA Intercontinental Cup, an association football competition involving the club champions of the six confederations of FIFA
- Intercontinental Cup (1960–2004), an association football competition organized jointly by UEFA and CONMEBOL from 1960–2004
- Under-20 Intercontinental Cup, an association football youth competition organized jointly by UEFA and CONMEBOL
- Intercontinental Cup (India), the replacement for the Nehru Cup, a friendly association football tournament played in India
- Inter Continental Cup, 2008 international invitational football tournament played in Malaysia

== Other sports ==
- Beach Soccer Intercontinental Cup, in Dubai, the United Arab Emirates
- FIBA Intercontinental Cup, a basketball competition between select winners of continental competitions winners
- FIRS Intercontinental Cup, a roller hockey competition between the winners of the CERH European League and the CSP South American Club Championship
- ICC Intercontinental Cup, a first-class cricket competition run by the International Cricket Council for 12 of its associate members
- Intercontinental Cup (baseball), a former baseball competition sanctioned by the International Baseball Federation
- Intercontinental Cup (skeleton), the intermediate-level tour in skeleton racing sanctioned by the International Bobsleigh and Skeleton Federation
- Intercontinental Le Mans Cup, a sports car racing competition organized by the Automobile Club de l'Ouest
- Intercontinental Futsal Cup, the international club championships for futsal

== See also ==
- Continental Cup (disambiguation)
