= Portuguese Roller Hockey Cup =

- Region: Portugal
- Teams: 4 (final four)
- Current champions: Sporting CP (6th title)
- Most championships: Porto (19 titles)
- Website: http://www.fpp.pt/
- 2025–26 season

The Portuguese Roller Hockey Cup (Portuguese: Taça de Portugal de Hóquei em Patins) is a Portuguese roller hockey knockout competition open to all domestic clubs. Following a series of knockout rounds, the competition winner is determined in a final-four mini-tournament, held in a neutral venue at the end of the season. The winners play in the following season's edition of the WSE Cup, unless they have already qualified for the WSE Champions League via league placing.

== Winners ==
| Year | Winners | Runners-up | Result |
|---|---|---|---|
| 2026 | Sporting CP | OC Barcelos | 4-0 |
| 2025 | Sporting CP | UD Oliveirense | 6–3 |
| 2024 | Porto | OC Barcelos | 3–2 |
| 2023 | SC Tomar | Sporting CP | 5–5 (3–1)p |
| 2022 | Porto | Benfica | 5–1 |
| 2021 | Abandoned due to the COVID-19 pandemic in Europe. | | |
| 2020 | Abandoned due to the COVID-19 pandemic in Europe. | | |
| 2019 | UD Oliveirense | Benfica | 5–2 |
| 2018 | Porto | AD Valongo | 3–2 |
| 2017 | Porto | SC Tomar | 5–1 |
| 2016 | Porto | Benfica | 4–2 |
| 2015 | Benfica | Sporting CP | 3–0 |
| 2014 | Benfica | Porto | 8–3 |
| 2013 | Porto | UD Oliveirense | 5–3 |
| 2012 | UD Oliveirense | Benfica | 3–1 |
| 2011 | UD Oliveirense | Candelária SC | 5–2 |
| 2010 | Benfica | AE Física | 6–1 |
| 2009 | Porto | Benfica | 2–1 |
| 2008 | Porto | HC Braga | 5–1 |
| 2007 | HA Cambra | HC Braga | 4–4 (2–1)p |
| 2006 | Porto | Juventude Viana | 7–4 |
| 2005 | Porto | Benfica | 3–2 |
| 2004 | OC Barcelos | Alenquer e Benfica | 5–1 |
| 2003 | OC Barcelos | Benfica | 6–3 |
| 2002 | Benfica | OC Barcelos | 6–1 |
| 2001 | Benfica | OC Barcelos | 4–2 |
| 2000 | Benfica | Porto | 2–0 |
| 1999 | Porto | OC Barcelos | 3–3 (5–3)p |
| 1998 | Porto | Benfica | 7–4 |
| 1997 | UD Oliveirense | OC Barcelos | 3–3 (6–4)p |
| 1996 | Porto | UD Oliveirense | 5–4 |
| 1995 | Benfica | OC Barcelos | 6–5 |
| 1994 | Benfica | Sporting CP | 11–3 |
| 1993 | OC Barcelos | Benfica | 5–4 |
| 1992 | OC Barcelos | Académica de Coimbra | 8–0 |
| 1991 | Benfica | HC Turquel | 3–1 |
| 1990 | Sporting CP | OC Barcelos | 5–4 |
| 1989 | Porto | CD Paço d'Arcos | 6–2 |
| 1988 | Porto | Sporting CP | 4–3 |
| 1987 | Porto | UD Oliveirense | 5–3 / 6–2 |
| 1986 | Porto | Benfica | 6–3 / 6–3 |
| 1985 | Porto | AD Sanjoanense | 6–1 / 8–3 |
| 1984 | Sporting CP | Porto | 7–9 / 7–4 |
| 1983 | Porto | Benfica | 8–3 / 4–7 |
| 1982 | Benfica | Porto | 3–5 / 8–7 |
| 1981 | Benfica | Porto | 5–3 |
| 1980 | Benfica | Sporting CP | 1–0 |
| 1979 | Benfica | Porto | 7–1 |
| 1978 | Benfica | AD Oeiras | 6–3 |
| 1977 | Sporting CP | AD Oeiras | 4–3 |
| 1976 | Sporting CP | AD Oeiras | 7–1 |
| 1964 | CD Malhangalene (MOZ) | Benfica | Table |
| 1963 | Benfica | AD Oeiras | 6–2 |

=== Wins by club ===
| Team | Wins | Runners-up | Winning years | Runner-up years |
|---|---|---|---|---|
| Porto | 19 | 6 | 1983, 1985, 1986, 1987, 1988, 1989, 1996, 1998, 1999, 2005, 2006, 2008, 2009, 2013, 2016, 2017, 2018, 2022, 2024 | 1979, 1981, 1982, 1984, 2000, 2014 |
| Benfica | 15 | 12 | 1963, 1978, 1979, 1980, 1981, 1982, 1991, 1994, 1995, 2000, 2001, 2002, 2010, 2014, 2015 | 1964, 1983, 1986, 1993, 1998, 2003, 2005, 2009, 2012, 2016, 2019, 2022 |
| Sporting CP | 6 | 5 | 1976, 1977, 1984, 1990, 2025, 2026 | 1980, 1988, 1994, 2015, 2023 |
| OC Barcelos | 4 | 8 | 1992, 1993, 2003, 2004 | 1990, 1995, 1997, 1999, 2001, 2002, 2024, 2026 |
| UD Oliveirense | 4 | 4 | 1997, 2011, 2012, 2019 | 1987, 1996, 2013, 2025 |
| SC Tomar | 1 | 1 | 2023 | 2017 |
| CD Malhangalene | 1 | 0 | 1964 | – |
| HA Cambra | 1 | 0 | 2007 | – |
| AD Oeiras | 0 | 4 | – | 1963, 1976, 1977, 1978 |
| HC Braga | 0 | 2 | – | 2007, 2008 |
| AD Sanjoanense | 0 | 1 | – | 1985 |
| Paço d'Arcos | 0 | 1 | – | 1989 |
| HC Turquel | 0 | 1 | – | 1991 |
| Académica de Coimbra | 0 | 1 | – | 1992 |
| Alenquer e Benfica | 0 | 1 | – | 2004 |
| Juventude Viana | 0 | 1 | – | 2006 |
| AE Física | 0 | 1 | – | 2010 |
| Candelária SC | 0 | 1 | – | 2011 |
| AD Valongo | 0 | 1 | – | 2018 |
