= 2013 FIRS Intercontinental Cup =

Tournament details
- Host country: Portugal
- City: Torres Novas
- Dates: 16 November 2013
- Teams: 2

Final positions
- Champions: (Portugal) Benfica (1st title)
- Runners-up: (Brazil) Sport Recife

Tournament statistics
- Matches played: 1
- Goals scored: 13 (13 per match)

The 2013 FIRS Intercontinental Cup was the 14th edition of the roller hockey tournament known as the Intercontinental Cup, played on 16 November 2013 at the Palácio dos Desportos de Torres Novas, in Torres Novas, Portugal. SL Benfica (winner of the 2012–13 CERH European League) won the cup for the first time, defeating Sport Recife (winner of the 2012 CSP South American Club Championship).

== Match ==
16 November 2013; 17:00 (UTC ±00:00)
16 November 2013; 17:00 (UTC ±00:00)	Benfica (Portugal)	10–3 (3–0 HT)	(Brazil) Sport Recife	Palácio dos Desportos de Torres Novas, Torres Novas
16 November 2013; 17:00 (UTC ±00:00)	1–0 Valter Neves 3'; 2–0 Diogo Rafael 23'; 3–0 Diogo Rafael 24'; 4–0 Carlos López 30'; 5–0 Marc Coy 35'; 6–2 Carlos López 45'; 7–3 João Rodrigues 46'; 8–3 Valter Neves 48'; 9–3 Miguel Rocha 48'; 10–3 Diogo Neves 49'		5–1 Felipe Castro 40'; 5–2 Fabrício Marimont 41'; 6–3 Fabrício Marimont 46'	Palácio dos Desportos de Torres Novas, Torres Novas
	Umpires: Francisco Romero, Teresa Cancelo (Spain)

== See also ==
- FIRS Intercontinental Cup
