= 2012–13 CERH European League =

Tournament details
- Dates: 10 November 2012 – 2 June 2013
- Teams: 16 (from 6 associations)

Final positions
- Champions: (Portugal) Benfica (1st title)
- Runners-up: (Portugal) Porto

Tournament statistics
- Matches played: 59
- Goals scored: 497 (8.42 per match)

The 2012–13 CERH European League was the 48th season of Europe's premier club roller hockey competition organized by CERH, the 16th season since it was renamed from Champions League to European League. Sixteen teams from six national associations qualified to the competition as a result of their respective national league placing in the previous season. Following a group stage and a knockout round, the four best teams contested a final four tournament to decide the competition winners, which took place in the venue of one of the teams.

The 2012–13 CERH European League final four took place in Porto, Portugal, at the Dragão Caixa, home of Porto, who qualified for this round together with Benfica (Portugal), Barcelona (Spain) and Valdagno (Italy). In the first all-Portuguese final, Benfica defeated the hosts FC Porto by 6–5 with a golden goal in extra-time, and secured their first European League title.

== Teams ==
Sixteen teams from six national associations qualified for the 2012–13 CERH European League as a result of their placing in their respective national leagues. The number of berths allocated to each national association was dependent on the association's ranking coefficient.

Country	Team	Qualified as
Spain	Liceo	Winner of 2011–12 CERH European League
Spain	Barcelona	1st in 2011–12 OK Liga
Spain	Noia	3rd in 2011–12 OK Liga
Spain	Igualada	4th in 2011–12 OK Liga
Spain	Reus	5th in 2011–12 OK Liga
Portugal	Benfica	1st in 2011–12 1ª Divisão
Portugal	FC Porto	2nd in 2011–12 1ª Divisão
Portugal	Candelária	3rd in 2011–12 1ª Divisão
Portugal	Oliveirense	4th in 2011–12 1ª Divisão
Italy	Valdagno	1st in 2011–12 Serie A1
Italy	Viareggio	2nd in 2011–12 Serie A1
Italy	Amatori Lodi	3rd in 2011–12 Serie A1
France	Dinan Quévert	1st in 2011–12 Nationale 1
France	Saint Omer	2nd in 2011–12 Nationale 1
Germany	Cronenberg	1st in 2011–12 Bundesliga
Switzerland	Genève	3rd in 2011–12 LNA

== Tournament ==
=== Group stage ===
==== Group A ====
	Team	Pld	W	D	L	GF	GA	Diff	Pts
1.	(Spain) Barcelona	6	4	2	0	19	11	+8	14
2.	(Spain) Igualada	6	3	1	2	18	15	+3	10
3.	(Portugal) Candelária	6	1	2	3	15	18	−3	5
4.	(France) Dinan Quévert	6	1	1	4	18	26	−8	4

	BAR	CAN	IGU	QUE
FC Barcelona	–	5–3	1–1	4–1
Candelária SC	3–3	–	3–1	1–3
Igualada HC	0–1	3–2	–	7–4
HC Quévert	2–5	3–3	4–6	–

==== Group B ====
	Team	Pld	W	D	L	GF	GA	Diff	Pts
1.	(Portugal) Porto	6	4	1	1	34	23	+11	13
2.	(Spain) Noia	6	3	1	2	17	15	+2	10
3.	(Italy) Amatori Lodi	6	2	2	2	28	24	+4	8
4.	(France) Saint Omer	6	0	2	4	19	36	−17	2

	FCP	NOI	LOD	STO
FC Porto	–	6–4	6–6	8–4
CE Noia	4–2	–	5–3	2–2
Amatori Lodi	2–4	1–0	–	10–3
Saint Omer	3–8	1–2	6–6	–

==== Group C ====
	Team	Pld	W	D	L	GF	GA	Diff	Pts
1.	(Portugal) Benfica	6	4	1	1	35	17	+18	13
2.	(Spain) Reus	6	4	0	2	32	26	+6	12
3.	(Italy) Viareggio	6	3	1	2	34	25	+9	10
4.	(Germany) Cronenberg	6	0	0	6	17	50	−33	0

	REU	SLB	VIA	CRO
Réus Deportiu	–	4–3	7–4	11–3
SL Benfica	7–1	–	4–4	12–3
CGC Viareggio	8–3	2–4	–	7–3
CSC Cronenberg	1–6	3–5	4–9	–

==== Group D ====
	Team	Pld	W	D	L	GF	GA	Diff	Pts
1.	(Italy) Valdagno	6	5	1	0	40	22	+18	16
2.	(Spain) Liceo	6	3	1	2	33	26	+7	10
3.	(Portugal) Oliveirense	6	3	0	3	37	32	+5	9
4.	(Switzerland) Genève	6	0	0	6	18	48	−30	0

	LIC	OLI	VAL	GEN
HC Liceo Coruña	–	6–3	4–4	8–2
UD Oliveirense	6–5	–	6–10	11–2
Hockey Valdagno	7–3	5–3	–	7–5
Genéve RHC	4–7	4–8	1–7	–

=== Quarter-finals ===
Team 1	Agg.	Team 2	1st leg	2nd leg
Liceo (Spain)	5–7	(Spain) Barcelona	2–2	3–5
Noia (Spain)	3–10	(Portugal) Benfica	3–3	0–7
Reus (Spain)	7–8	(Portugal) Porto	3–2	4–6
Igualada (Spain)	2–6	(Italy) Valdagno	2–3	0–3

== Final four ==
The final-four round was played at Porto's ground, the Dragão Caixa arena, after CERH approved unanimously their bid over those of Valdagno and Benfica, on 16 May 2013.

Semi-finals
1 June – 15:00 (GMT)
(Portugal) Benfica	4 (2)
(Spain) Barcelona	4 (1)
1 June – 18:00 (GMT)
(Portugal) Porto	9
(Italy) Valdagno	7

Final
2 June – 17:00 (GMT)
(Portugal) Benfica	6
(Portugal) Porto	5

=== Semi-finals ===
1 June
15:00 (GMT)

Barcelona (Spain)	4–4 (a.e.t.)	(Portugal) Benfica
1–1 Pablo Alvarez 22' 1st Hf; 2–1 Sergi Panadero 22' 1st Hf; 3–2 Marc Torra LD 10th Flt 11' 2nd Hf; 4–3 Sergi Miras 17' 2nd Hf		0–1 João Rodrigues 3' 1st Hf; 2–2 Luís Viana GP 1' 2nd Hf; 3–3 Luís Viana GP 1' 2nd Hf; 4–4 Carlos Lopez 24'17"' 2nd Hf
Penalties
Sergi Miras (penalty missed); Reinaldo Garcia (penalty missed); HM Ordeig (penalty scored); Marc Torra (penalty missed); Marc Gual (penalty missed)	1–2	(penalty scored) Esteban Ábalos; (penalty missed) Diogo Rafael; (penalty scored) Marc Coy; (penalty missed) João Rodrigues

Dragão Caixa, Porto
Attendance: 1,526
Referee: Alessandro Eccelsi, Alessandro Da Prato (Italy)
1 June
18:00 (GMT)

Porto (Portugal)	9–7	(Italy) Valdagno
1–0 Ricardo Barreiros 5' 1st Hf; 2–0 Reinaldo Ventura GP 9' 1st Hf; 3–2 Hélder Nunes LD 10th Flt 21' 1st Hf; 4–2 Pedro Moreira 1' 2nd Hf; 5–5 Ricardo Barreiros 9' 2nd Hf; 6–6 Caio 17' 2nd Hf; 7–7 Ricardo Barreiros GP 20' 2nd Hf; 8–7 Caio 21' 2nd Hf; 9–7 Hélder Nunes 22' 2nd Hf		2–1 Pedro Gil 9' 1st Hf; 2–2 Carlos Nicolia LD 10th Flt 15' 1st Hf; 4–3 Sérgio Silva 1' 2nd Hf; 4–4 Sérgio Silva GP 3' 2nd Hf; 4–5 Eddy Randon 8' 2nd Hf; 5–6 Pedro Gil 13' 2nd Hf; 5–7 Carlos Nicolia LD 15th Flt 18' 2nd Hf

Dragão Caixa, Porto
Attendance: 2,000
Referee: Oscar Valverde Munuera, F. Jorge Garcia Romero (Spain)

=== Final ===
2 June
17:00 (GMT)

Benfica (Portugal)	6–5 (a.e.t.)	(Portugal) Porto
2–1 Cacau LD Blue 8' 1st Hf; 3–2 Luís Viana GP 11' 1st Hf; 3–3 Diogo Rafael 19' 1st Hf; 4–4 Marc Coy 5' 2nd Hf; 5–4 Luís Viana GP 15' 2nd Hf; 6–5 Diogo Rafael 2' et (golden goal)		1–0 Jorge Silva 2' 1st Hf; 2–0 Reinaldo Ventura GP 7' 1st Hf; 3–1 Reinaldo Ventura 9' 1st Hf; 4–3 Hélder Nunes 22' 1st Hf; 5–5 Reinaldo Ventura LD 19' 2nd Hf

Dragão Caixa, Porto
Attendance: 2,000
Referee: Oscar Valverde Munuera, F. Jorge Garcia Romero (Spain)

2012–13 CERH European League winners
(Portugal)
Benfica
First title
