= 2017 Roller Hockey Intercontinental Cup =

Copa Intercontinental d'Hoquei Patins

Tournament details
- Host country: Spain
- City: Reus
- Dates: 15–16 December
- Teams: 4
- Venue: 1 (in 1 host city)

Final positions
- Champions: (Portugal) Benfica (2nd title)
- Runners-up: (Spain) Reus

Tournament statistics
- Matches played: 3
- Goals scored: 31 (10.33 per match)
- Top scorer(s): (Spain) Jordi Adroher (Spain) Raül Marín (4 goals each)

The 2017 Roller Hockey Intercontinental Cup was the 16th edition of the roller hockey tournament known as the Intercontinental Cup, endorsed by World Skate. It was held in the Pavelló Olímpic in Reus, Spain. Benfica won the competition by beating Reus in the final (5–3). It was their second triumph in the Intercontinental Cup.

The tournament was a knockout competition in a final four format; four teams entered, with the host selected after the teams became known. Entered the tournament the European League winners from the 2015–16 and 2016–17 seasons and the South American Club Championship/Pan-American Club Championship winners from the 2016 and 2017 seasons.

== Teams ==
Team	Qualified as	Qualified on
(Portugal) Benfica	2015–16 CERH European League winner	15 May 2016
(Argentina) Andes Talleres	2016 South American Roller Hockey Club Championship winner	17 December 2016
(Spain) Reus (host)	2016–17 CERH European League winner	14 May 2017
(Argentina) Concepción	2017 Pan-American Roller Hockey Club Championship winner	29 November 2017

== Venue ==
2017 Roller Hockey Intercontinental Cup is located in Spain	Reus
2017 Roller Hockey Intercontinental Cup is located in Spain	Pavelló Olímpic de Reus
2017 Roller Hockey Intercontinental Cup is located in Spain	Capacity: 3,500

== Matches ==
In all matches, extra time and a penalty shootout were used to decide the winner if necessary.

All times are local, CET (UTC+1).

=== Bracket ===
Semi-finals
15 December
(Argentina) Andes Talleres	4
(Portugal) Benfica	7
15 December
(Spain) Reus (a.e.t.)	7
(Argentina) Concepción	5

Final
16 December
(Portugal) Benfica	5
(Spain) Reus	3

=== Semi-finals ===
15 December 2017
19:30

Andes Talleres (Argentina)	4–7	(Portugal) Benfica
E. Tamborindegui 3', 24'; Fontán 17'; López 33'		Rocha 6'; Nicolía 7', 10' (pen.), 32' (pen.); Rodrigues 20'; Rafael 36', 41'

Pavelló Olímpic, Reus
Referee: Óscar Valverde and Antonio Gómez (Spain)
15 December 2017
21:15

Reus (Spain)	7–5 (a.e.t.)	(Argentina) Concepción
Marín 26', 57' (pen.), 59' (pen.); Torra 26'; Rodríguez 46', 46'; Salvat 57'		Páez 8'; Maturano 9'; Giuliani 22', 35', 58'

Pavelló Olímpic, Reus
Referee: Luís Peixoto and Paulo Rainha (Portugal)

=== Final ===
16 December 2017
17:00

Benfica (Portugal)	5–3	(Spain) Reus
Adroher 28' (pen.), 34', 35', 49'; Neves 48'		Casanovas 18' (pen.), 32' (pen.); Marín 37'

Pavelló Olímpic, Reus
Referee: Xavier Bleuzen (France) and Franco Ferrari (Italy)

== Statistics ==
=== Goalscorers ===
With four goals, Raül Marín and Jordi Adroher were the top scorers in the tournament. In total, there were 31 goals scored by 17 different players in 3 games, for an average of 10.33 goals per game.

4 goals

- (Spain) Jordi Adroher
- (Spain) Raül Marín

3 goals

- (Argentina) Carlos Nicolía
- (Argentina) Mauro Giuliani

2 goals

- (Argentina) Exequiel Tamborindegui
- (Portugal) Diogo Rafael
- (Spain) Àlex Rodríguez
- (Spain) Albert Casanovas

1 goal

- (Argentina) Juan Cruz Fontán
- (Argentina) Carlos López
- (Portugal) Miguel Rocha
- (Portugal) João Rodrigues
- (Spain) Marc Torra
- (Spain) Joan Salvat
- (Argentina) David Páez
- (Argentina) Jorge Martín Maturano
- (Portugal) Valter Neves

=== Fastest goal ===
- 3 minutes: Exequiel Tamborindegui (Andes Talleres vs Benfica)
