= Continental Cup =

Continental Cup may refer to

- Continental Cup (curling), annual curling tournament between North American and World teams
- Continental Cup (KHL), trophy presented to the annual winner of the Kontinental Hockey League regular season
- FA WSL Continental Cup, a cup competition for teams in the FA WSL (Women's Super League) in association football, named for sponsorship reasons
- IAAF Continental Cup, quadrennial track and field competition (formerly IAAF World Cup)
- IIHF Continental Cup, annual European ice hockey tournament
- Inter Continental Cup, minor national association football tournament
- WSE Continental Cup, annual roller hockey match between the WSE Champions League and the WSE Cup winners
- FIS Ski Jumping Continental Cup, annual ski jumping competition organised by the International Ski Federation
- Continental Cup (cricket), also known as Romania T20 Cup, is an annual Twenty20 International cricket competition

== See also ==
- Intercontinental Cup (disambiguation)
