= 1992 FIRS Intercontinental Cup =

23-26 March 1992 FIRS Intercontinental Cup
Tournament details
- Host country: Brazil
- City: Sertãozinho
- Dates: 23-26 March 1992
- Teams: 2

Final positions
- Champions: (Portugal) OC Barcelos (1st title)
- Runners-up: (Brazil) Sertãozinho HC

Tournament statistics
- Matches played: 2
- Goals scored: 13 (6.5 per match)

The 1992 FIRS Intercontinental Cup was the fifth edition of the roller hockey tournament known as the Intercontinental Cup, played in March 1992. OC Barcelos won the cup, defeating Sertãozinho HC.

== Matches ==
23 March 1992
23 March 1992	Sertãozinho HC (Brazil)	1 – 2	(Portugal) OC Barcelos	Sertãozinho, Brazil

26 March 1992
26 March 1992	Sertãozinho HC (Brazil)	3 – 7	(Portugal) OC Barcelos	Sertãozinho, Brazil

== See also ==
- FIRS Intercontinental Cup
