= WSE Continental Cup =

Football competition

- Current season, competition or edition: 2026 Rink Hockey Continental Cup
- Sport: Roller hockey
- Founded: 1980; 46 years ago
- Organising body: World Skate Europe - Rink Hockey
- No. of teams: 4
- Most recent champion: (Portugal) Porto (3rd title)
- Most titles: (Spain) FC Barcelona (18 titles)
- Website: 2024 WSE Continental Cup

The WSE Continental Cup is an annual roller hockey match organised by the World Skate Europe - Rink Hockey since 1980, and contested by the winners of the top two European club competitions, the WSE Champions League (1st tier) and the WSE Cup (2nd tier).

The current winners are Portuguese side Porto who defeated Spanish side Lleida 7-1 in the 2026 final-four edition to win their third title.

== History ==
It was originally contested by the winners of the European Cup and the Cup Winners' Cup, both organised by the Comité Européen de Rink-Hockey. In 1997, following the merging of the two competitions to form the Champions League, the Continental Cup began being contested against the winners of the CERS Cup (currently WSE Cup). Mainly contested in a two-team format (one or two legs), it has been played in a final-four format involving the two top-ranked teams of each European club competition since 2017 (except in 2021, played as a one-legged match between two teams).

== Matches ==
Key
Winner of European Cup/European League/WSE Champions League
Winner of CERH Cup Winners' Cup
Winner of CERS/WSE Cup

Year	Champion	Runner-up	Score	Location
Two-team format
1980	(Spain) Barcelona	(Italy) Giovinazzo	9–4	(Spain) Barcelona
1981	(Spain) Barcelona	(Portugal) Sporting CP	6–2, 12–1	Two-legged finals
1982	(Spain) Barcelona	(Portugal) Porto	3–2, 7–1	Two-legged finals
1983	(Spain) Barcelona	(Portugal) Porto	3–4, 11–5	Two-legged finals
1984	(Spain) Barcelona	(Spain) Reus Deportiu	2–1, 10–1	Two-legged finals
1985	(Spain) Barcelona	(Portugal) Sporting CP	9–0, 5–3	Two-legged finals
1986	(Portugal) Porto	(Portugal) Sanjoanense	9–3, 3–4	Two-legged finals
1987	(Spain) Liceo	(Spain) Barcelona	4–4, 4–1	Two-legged finals
1988	(Spain) Liceo	(Spain) Noia	9–4, 2–4	Two-legged finals
1989	(Spain) Noia	(Italy) Monza	2–3, 7–3	Two-legged finals
1990	(Spain) Liceo	(Portugal) Porto	6–4, 3–2	Two-legged finals
1991	(Portugal) Barcelos	(Portugal) Sporting CP	11–2, 5–3	Two-legged finals
1992	(Spain) Liceo	(Italy) Monza	9–6, 6–4	Two-legged finals
1993	(Spain) Igualada	(Portugal) Barcelos	4–1, 3–3	Two-legged finals
1994	(Spain) Igualada	(Italy) Amatori Lodi	1–1, 5–0	Two-legged finals
1995	(Spain) Igualada	(Italy) Monza	1–2, 4–2	Two-legged finals
1996	Not played (Note: The rightful contestants were Igualada and Porto.)			
1997	(Spain) Barcelona	(Portugal) Oliveirense	6–1, 8–1	Two-legged finals
1998	(Spain) Igualada	(Spain) Noia	2–4, 4–1	Two-legged finals
1999	(Spain) Igualada	(Spain) Liceo	7–3, 1–4	Two-legged finals
2000	(Spain) Barcelona	(Portugal) Paço d'Arcos	2–1, 7–1	Two-legged finals
2001	(Spain) Barcelona	(Spain) Vic	6–6, 12–3	Two-legged finals
2002	(Spain) Barcelona	(Spain) Voltregà	4–4, 8–1	Two-legged finals
2003	(Spain) Liceo	(Spain) Reus Deportiu	2–1, 3–1	Two-legged finals
2004	(Spain) Barcelona	(Spain) Reus Deportiu	1–1, 6–2	Two-legged finals
2005	(Spain) Barcelona	(Italy) Follonica	4–0, 4–7	Two-legged finals
2006	(Spain) Barcelona	(Italy) Follonica	7–1, 0–2	Two-legged finals
2007	(Spain) Barcelona	(Spain) Vilanova	5–0	(France) Dinan
2008	(Spain) Barcelona	(Spain) Tenerife	3–1	(Spain) Pamplona
2009	(Spain) Reus Deportiu	(Spain) Mataró	4–1	(Spain) Noia
2010	(Spain) Barcelona	(Spain) Liceo	7–2	(Spain) Bilbao
2011	(Portugal) Benfica	(Spain) Liceo	10–0 (Note: HC Liceo La Coruña failed to attend the match, and was punished with a 10–0 defeat, according to the Official Game Rules.)	(Portugal) Viana do Castelo
2012	(Spain) Liceo	(Italy) Bassano	1–5, 6–2 (2–1 p)	Two-legged finals
2013	(Portugal) Benfica	(Spain) Vendrell	5–3, 5–0	Two-legged finals
2014	(Spain) Noia	(Spain) Barcelona	0–0, 3–3 (3–2 p)	Two-legged finals
2015	(Spain) Barcelona	(Portugal) Sporting CP	0–2, 5–1	Two-legged finals
2016	(Portugal) Benfica	(Portugal) Barcelos	4–5, 9–2	Two-legged finals
Final four format
2017	(Portugal) Oliveirense	(Spain) Reus Deportiu	7–4	(Italy) Viareggio
2018	(Spain) Barcelona	(Portugal) Porto	3–3 (3–2 p)	(Portugal) Barcelos
2019	(Portugal) Sporting CP	(Portugal) Porto	3–2	(Portugal) Lisbon
2020	Not played (due to the COVID-19 pandemic in Europe).			
Two-team format
2021	(Portugal) Sporting CP	(Spain) Lleida Llista Blava	3–1	(Spain) Mollerussa
Final four format
2022	(Portugal) AD Valongo	(Italy) Trissino	2–1	(Italy) Trissino
2023	(Portugal) Porto	(Spain) Voltregà	5–3	(Spain) Sant Hipòlit de Voltregà
2024	(Portugal) Oliveirense	(Portugal) Sporting CP	4–2	(Portugal) Oliveira de Azeméis
2025	(Portugal) OC Barcelos	(Portugal) Porto	4–3	(Portugal) Barcelos
2026	(Portugal) Porto	(Spain) Lleida	7–1	(Spain) Calafell

== Performances ==
=== By teams ===
Team	Won	Runner-up	Years won	Years runner-up
(Spain) Barcelona	18	2	1980, 1981, 1982, 1983, 1984, 1985, 1997, 2000, 2001, 2002, 2004, 2005, 2006, 2007, 2008, 2010, 2015, 2018	1987, 2014
(Spain) Liceo	6	3	1987, 1988, 1990, 1992, 2003, 2012	1999, 2010, 2011
(Spain) Igualada	5	0	1993, 1994, 1995, 1998, 1999	–
(Portugal) Porto	3	6	1986, 2023, 2026	1982, 1983, 1990, 2018, 2019, 2025
(Portugal) Benfica	3	0	2011, 2013, 2016	–
(Portugal) Sporting CP	2	5	2019, 2021	1981, 1985, 1991, 2015, 2024
(Spain) Noia	2	2	1989, 2014	1988, 1998
(Portugal) Oliveirense	2	1	2017, 2024	1997
(Portugal) Barcelos	2	2	1991, 2025	1993, 2016
(Spain) Reus Deportiu	1	4	2009	1984, 2003, 2004, 2017
(Portugal) AD Valongo	1	0	2022	–
(Italy) Monza	0	3	–	1989, 1992, 1995
(Italy) Follonica	0	2	–	2005, 2006
(Spain) Voltregà	0	2	–	2002, 2023
(Spain) Lleida Llista Blava	0	2	–	2021, 2026
(Italy) Giovinazzo	0	1	–	1980
(Portugal) Sanjoanense	0	1	–	1986
(Italy) Amatori Lodi	0	1	–	1994
(Portugal) Paço d'Arcos	0	1	–	2000
(Spain) Vic	0	1	–	2001
(Spain) Vilanova	0	1	–	2007
(Spain) Tenerife	0	1	–	2008
(Spain) Mataró	0	1	–	2009
(Italy) Bassano	0	1	–	2012
(Spain) Vendrell	0	1	–	2013
(Italy) Trissino	0	1	–	2022

=== By countries ===
Nation	Winners	Runners-up	Winning clubs	Runners-up
Spain	32	19	Barcelona (18), Liceo (6), Igualada (5), Noia (2), Reus Deportiu (1)	Reus Deportiu (4), Liceo (3), Lleida Llista Blava (2), Noia (2), Barcelona (2), Vic (1), Voltregà (2), Vilanova (1), Tenerife (1), Mataró (1), Vendrell (1)
Portugal	13	16	Benfica (3), Porto (3), Sporting CP (2), Oliveirense (2), Barcelos (2), AD Valongo (1)	Porto (6), Sporting CP (5), Barcelos (2), Sanjoanense (1), Oliveirense (1), Paço d'Arcos (1)
Italy	0	9	–	Monza (3), Follonica (2), Giovinazzo (1), Amatori Lodi (1), Bassano (1), Trissino (1)
