= Ferran Font =

Spanish roller hockey player

Personal information
- Full name: Ferran Font i Sánchez
- Nationality: Spanish
- Born: 12 November 1996 (age 29) Vic, Spain
- Years active: 2012–
- Height: 1.72 m (5 ft 7 1/2 in)

Sport
- Country: Spain
- Sport: Roller hockey
- Team: (Spain) CP Vic (2012–2016) (Portugal) Sporting CP (2016–)

Ferran Font (born 12 November 1996) is a Spanish professional roller hockey player who plays for Sporting CP in Portugal. He won the 2018–19 Rink Hockey Euroleague for Sporting CP and the 2018 Rink Hockey European Championship for Spain national roller hockey team. As a youth, he won the CERH European Roller Hockey U-17 Championship in 2011 in Geneva.

== Biography ==
Ferran Font was born in Vic, Spain. His mother tongue is Catalan. He started playing in C.P. Voltregà, where he did his first steps on skates. Some years later, he changed teams to one of the greatest rivals C.P. Vic, where he was able to reach the senior team in OK Liga. In 2016, Font signed for Sporting CP roller hockey team in Portugal.
