= Ângelo Girão =

Portuguese roller hockey player (born 1989)

Personal information
- Full name: Ângelo André Ferreira Girão
- Nationality: Portuguese
- Born: 28 August 1989 (age 36) Porto, Portugal
- Years active: 1996–

Sport
- Country: Portugal
- Sport: Roller hockey
- Team: (Portugal) Sporting CP (2014–)

Ângelo Girão (born 28 August 1989) is a Portuguese roller hockey player. He is the goalkeeper and captain of Sporting CP.

For Portugal, he was European champion in 2016 and world champion in 2019.
