= 2015–16 CERH European League =

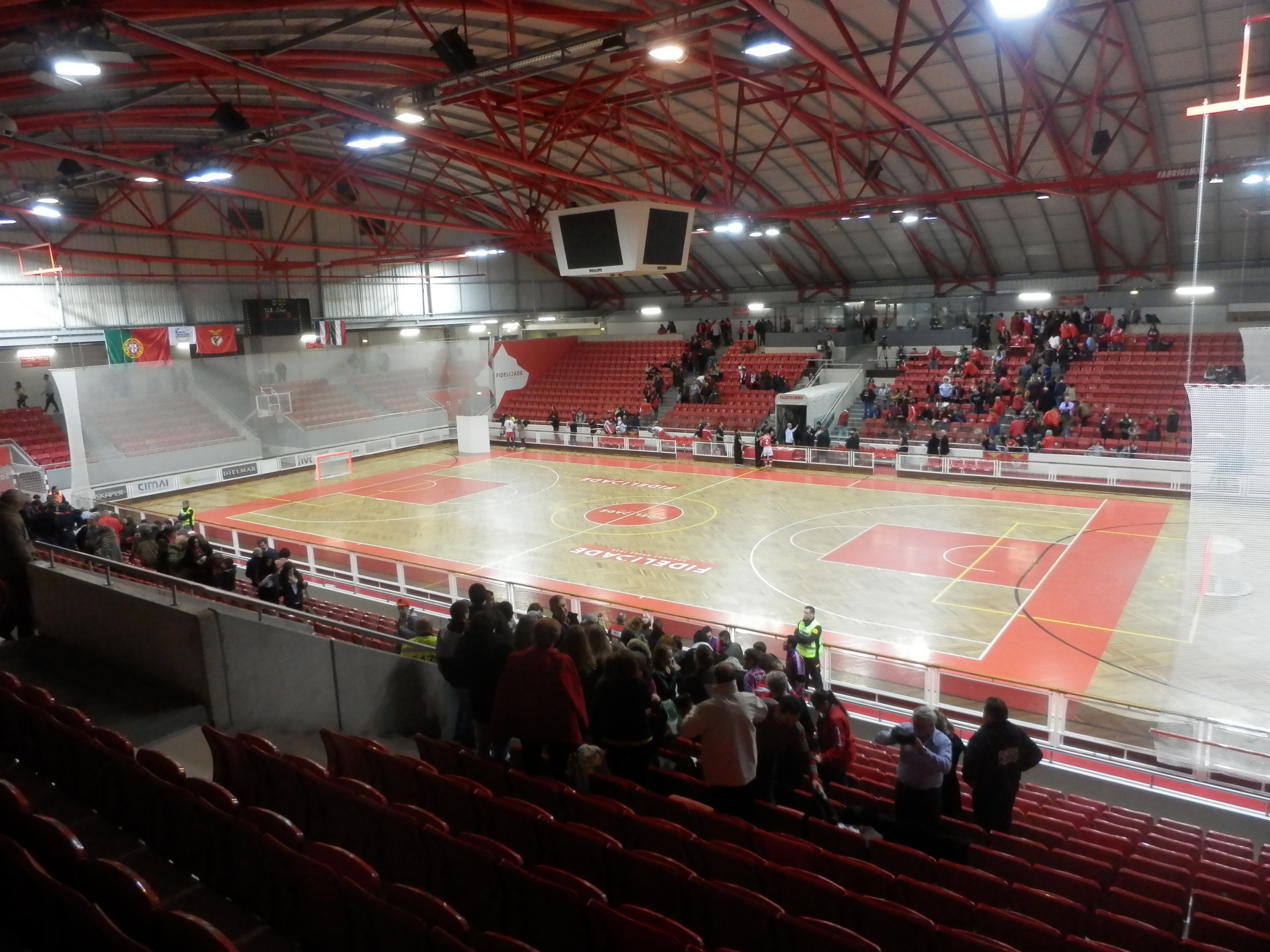
- The Pavilhão Fidelidade in Lisbon hosted the Final Four.

Tournament details
- Dates: 24 October 2015 – 15 May 2016
- Teams: 16 (from 6 associations)

Final positions
- Champions: (Portugal) Benfica (2nd title)
- Runners-up: (Portugal) Oliveirense

Tournament statistics
- Matches played: 59
- Goals scored: 528 (8.95 per match)
- Top scorer(s): (Spain) Pedro Gil (21 goals)

The 2015–16 CERH European League is the 51st season of Europe's premier club roller hockey tournament organised by CERH, and the 19th season since it was renamed from European Champion Clubs' Cup to CERH Champions League/European League.

Barcelona were the defending champions, but they were eliminated in semi-finals by the eventual winners Benfica, who became European champions for a second time.

== Teams ==
League positions of the previous season shown in parentheses (TH: Title holders, CW: Cup winners, LSF: Losing semi-finalists, LQF: Losing quarter-finalists). Bold means seeded teams.

Group stage
(Spain) **Barcelona**^{TH} (1st)	(Portugal) **Benfica** (1st)	(Italy) **Forte dei Marmi** (1st)	(France) Dinan Quévert (1st)
(Spain) **Liceo La Coruña** (2nd)	(Portugal) Porto (2nd)	(Italy) Viareggio (2nd)	(France) Mérignac (2nd)
(Spain) Vic (CW)	(Portugal) Oliveirense (3rd)	(Italy) Breganze (LSF)	(Germany) Iserlohn (1st)
(Spain) Vendrell (3rd)	(Portugal) Valongo (4th)	(Italy) Bassano (LQF)	(Switzerland) Basel (1st)

== Round dates ==
The schedule of the competition is as follows (draw held at CERH headquarters in Lisbon, Portugal, on 6 September 2015).

Phase	Round	First leg	Second leg
Group stage	Matchday 1	24 October 2015	
Group stage	Matchday 2	7 November 2015	
Group stage	Matchday 3	28 November 2015	
Group stage	Matchday 4	12 December 2015	
Group stage	Matchday 5	16 January 2016	
Group stage	Matchday 6	6 February 2016	
Knockout phase	Quarter-finals	5 March 2016	2 April 2016
Knockout phase	Semi-finals	14 May 2016	
Knockout phase	Final	15 May 2016	

== Group stage ==
The draw for the group stage was held on 6 September 2015, 11:00, in Luso, Portugal. The 16 teams were allocated into four pots, with the title holders Barcelona being automatically placed in pot 1. Liceo La Coruña, Benfica and Forte dei Marmi were the other three seeded teams. The remaining teams were then drawn into four groups of four, with the restriction that teams from the same association could not be drawn into the same group. In each group, teams play against each other in a home-and-away round-robin format, with the top two teams advancing to the knockout stage.

=== Group A ===
Pos	Team	Pld	W	D	L	GF	GA	GD	Pts	Qualification	POR	BAR	BRE	ISE
1	(Portugal) Porto	6	6	0	0	46	8	+38	**18**	Advanced to knockout phase	—	1–0	13–4	21–1
2	(Spain) Barcelona	6	4	0	2	34	12	+22	**12**	Advanced to knockout phase	1–2	—	5–2	7–2
3	(Italy) Breganze	6	1	1	4	24	34	−10	**4**		1–2	4–6	—	7–2
4	(Germany) Iserlohn	6	0	1	5	13	63	−50	**1**		1–7	1–15	6–6	—

Source: CERH

=== Group B ===
Pos	Team	Pld	W	D	L	GF	GA	GD	Pts	Qualification	BEN	VIC	BAS	MER
1	(Portugal) Benfica	6	5	0	1	41	18	+23	**15**	Advanced to knockout phase	—	5–1	9–6	8–0
2	(Spain) Vic	6	5	0	1	36	17	+19	**15**	Advanced to knockout phase	7–6	—	8–0	9–0
3	(Italy) Bassano	6	1	0	5	24	43	−19	**3**		2–8	5–8	—	7–5
4	(France) Mérignac	6	1	0	5	13	36	−23	**3**		2–5	1–3	5–4	—

Source: CERH

=== Group C ===
Pos	Team	Pld	W	D	L	GF	GA	GD	Pts	Qualification	FOR	VEN	VAL	QUE
1	(Italy) Forte dei Marmi	6	4	2	0	39	24	+15	**14**	Advanced to knockout phase	—	6–2	8–7	9–1
2	(Spain) Vendrell	6	3	1	2	27	24	+3	**10**	Advanced to knockout phase	6–6	—	5–1	8–4
3	(Portugal) Valongo	6	2	1	3	26	27	−1	**7**		5–5	5–3	—	5–1
4	(France) Dinan Quévert	6	1	0	5	16	33	−17	**3**		3–5	2–3	5–3	—

Source: CERH

=== Group D ===
Pos	Team	Pld	W	D	L	GF	GA	GD	Pts	Qualification	LIC	OLI	VIA	BAS
1	(Spain) Liceo La Coruña	6	5	0	1	37	15	+22	**15**	Advanced to knockout phase	—	5–3	7–2	13–1
2	(Portugal) Oliveirense	6	5	0	1	35	22	+13	**15**	Advanced to knockout phase	4–2	—	5–3	10–5
3	(Italy) Viareggio	6	2	0	4	26	32	−6	**6**		2–5	5–7	—	8–4
4	(Switzerland) Basel	6	0	0	6	19	48	−29	**0**		3–5	2–6	4–6	—

Source: CERH

== Knockout phase ==
The knockout phase comprises a quarter-final round and the final four tournament. In the quarter-finals, group stage winners play against group stage runners-up, the latter hosting the first of two legs. The winners qualify for the final four, which will take place at the ground of one of the four finalists.

=== Quarter-finals ===
The first-leg matches were played on 5 March, and the second-leg matches were played on 2 April 2016.

Team 1	Agg.	Team 2	1st leg	2nd leg
**Oliveirense** (Portugal)	8–6	(Portugal) Porto	4–3	4–3
Vendrell (Spain)	8–10	(Portugal) **Benfica**	3–5	5–5
Vic (Spain)	7–8	(Italy) **Forte dei Marmi**	2–1	5–7
**Barcelona** (Spain)	8–2	(Spain) Liceo La Coruña	6–0	2–2

=== Final four ===
The final four tournament took place on 14 and 15 May 2016. It was hosted by Benfica at the Pavilhão Fidelidade in Lisbon, Portugal.

Semi-finals
14 May 2016 – Lisbon
(Portugal) **Oliveirense**	**3**
(Italy) Forte dei Marmi	2
14 May 2016 – Lisbon
(Portugal) **Benfica** (pen.)	**1 (2)**
(Spain) Barcelona	1 (1)

Final
15 May 2016 – Lisbon
(Portugal) Oliveirense	3
(Portugal) **Benfica**	**5**

All times listed below are local time (UTC+01:00).

==== Semi-finals ====
14 May 2016
15:00

Benfica (Portugal)	1–1 (a.e.t.)	(Spain) Barcelona
Marc Torra 47'	Report	Pablo Álvarez 34'
Penalties
João Rodrigues (penalty missed); Jordi Adroher (penalty scored); Marc Torra (penalty scored); Carlos Nicolía (penalty missed)	2–1	(penalty missed) Xavier Barroso; (penalty missed) Matías Pascual; (penalty missed) Xavi Costa; (penalty scored) Sergi Panadero; (penalty missed) Lucas Ordóñez

Pavilhão Fidelidade, Lisbon
Referee: Alessandro Da Prato, Alessandro Eccelsi (Italy)
14 May 2016
18:30

Oliveirense (Portugal)	3–2	(Italy) Forte dei Marmi
Ricardo Barreiros 12', 20', 43'	Report	Pedro Gil 16', 26'

Pavilhão Fidelidade, Lisbon
Referee: Óscar Valverde, Francisco Garcia (Spain)

==== Final ====
15 May 2016
14:00

Oliveirense (Portugal)	3–5	(Portugal) Benfica
João Souto 16', 19'; Ricardo Oliveira 18'	Report	Diogo Rafael 14', 17'; Jordi Adroher 33', 46'; Carlos Nicolía 38'

Pavilhão Fidelidade, Lisbon
Referee: Arnauld Esoli, Xavier Bleuzen (France)

2015–16 CERH European League winners
(Portugal)
Benfica
2nd title

== See also ==
- 2015 CERH Continental Cup
- 2015 FIRS Intercontinental Cup
