= Matías Platero =

Argentinian roller hockey player

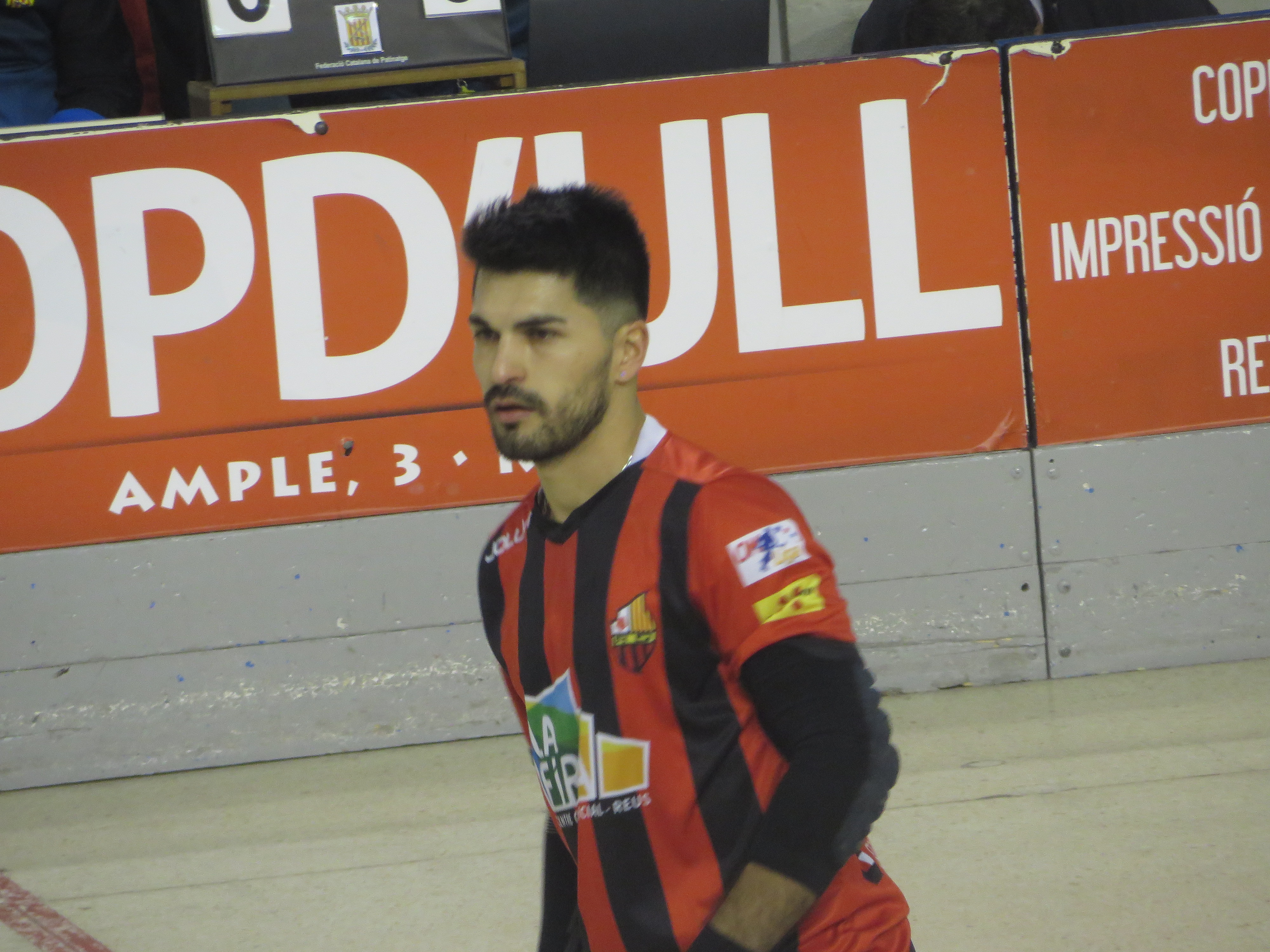
- Matías Platero

Personal information
- Full name: Matías Jonathan Platero
- Born: 17 October 1988 (age 37) San Juan, Argentina
- Years active: 2004–
- Height: 1.75 m (5 ft 9 in)

Sport
- Country: Argentina
- Sport: Roller hockey
- Team: (Argentina) Concepción PC (2004–2007) (Spain) Reus (2007–2009) (Argentina) Concepción PC (2009–2010) (Italy) Lodi (2010–2013) (Italy) Valdagno (2013–2014) (Spain) Reus (2014–2017) (Portugal) Sporting CP (2017–)

Matías Jonathan Platero (born October 17, 1988) is a professional roller hockey player who plays for Sporting CP.
