= 2019 Rink Hockey Continental Cup =

Tournament details
- Dates: 28–29 September 2019
- Teams: 4 (from 3 associations)

Final positions
- Champions: Sporting CP (1st title)
- Runners-up: Porto

Tournament statistics
- Matches played: 3
- Goals scored: 22 (7.33 per match)

The 2019 Rink Hockey Continental Cup was the 39th season of the Continental Cup, Europe's roller hockey Super Cup, organized by the World Skate Europe - Rink Hockey.

Four teams from three federations played for the title on 28 and 29 September 2019 in Lisbon.

Portuguese club Sporting CP won their first title ever.

== Teams ==
Team	Qualified as	Appearance
(Portugal) Sporting CP	Euroleague champion	5th
(Portugal) Porto	Euroleague runner-up	6th
(Spain) Lleida Llista Blava	WS Europe Cup champion	2nd
(Italy) Sarzana	WS Europe Cup runner-up	1st

== Bracket ==
Semi-finals
28 September
(Portugal) Sporting CP	7
(Italy) Sarzana	0
28 September
(Spain) Lleida Llista Blava	2
(Portugal) Porto	8

Final
29 September
(Portugal) Sporting CP	3
(Portugal) Porto	2
