= Hóquei Académico de Cambra =

Portuguese rink hockey club

- Sport: Rink hockey
- League: Portuguese Roller Hockey First Division
- Arena: Pavilhão Municipal Vale de Cambra
- Manager: Helder Pinho
- Short name: HA Cambra
- Website: www.hac.pt

Hóquei Académico de Cambra (HAC) is a rink hockey club from Vale de Cambra, Portugal. Its senior team participates in the Portuguese Roller Hockey First Division.

== Honours ==
- Portuguese Cup: 1

2006–07
