= 2016–17 CERS Cup =

Tournament details
- Dates: 5 November – 30 April
- Teams: 30 (from 8 associations)

Final positions
- Champions: (Portugal) Barcelos (3rd title)
- Runners-up: (Italy) Viareggio

Tournament statistics
- Matches played: 55
- Goals scored: 413 (7.51 per match)
- Top scorer(s): (Argentina) Emanuel García (11)

The 2016–17 CERS Cup is the 37th season of the CERS Cup, Europe's second club roller hockey competition organized by CERH. Thirty teams from eight national associations qualified for the competition as a result of their respective national league placing in the previous season. Barcelos won the title for the second consecutive season.

== Teams ==
Location of teams of the 2016–17 CERS Cup.

Thirty teams from eight national associations qualified for the competition. League positions of the previous season shown in parentheses.

Participating teams
(Germany) Germania Herringen (1st)	(Italy) Trissino (9th)	(Switzerland) Uttigen (3rd)	(Portugal) Juventude Viana (7th)
(Germany) Walsum (3rd)	(Italy) Sarzana (12th)	(Switzerland) Biasca (5th)	(Portugal) Turquel (8th)
(Germany) Düsseldorf-Nord (4th)	(Spain) Vendrell (5th)	(Switzerland) Uri (6th)	(Austria) Dornbirn (1st)
(Germany) Darmstadt (5th)	(Spain) Vilafranca (6th)	(Switzerland) Wimmis (9th)	(Austria) Wolfurt (2nd)
(Germany) Remscheid (7th)	(Spain) Caldes (7th)	(France) Coutras (4th)	(England) King's Lynn (1st)
(Italy) Viareggio (4th)	(Spain) Igualada (8th)	(France) Ploufragan (5th)	(England) Soham (2nd)
(Italy) Follonica (7th)	(Spain) Noia (9th)	(France) Saint-Omer (6th)	
(Italy) Monza (8th)	(Switzerland) Genève (2nd)	(Portugal) Barcelos (TH)	

== Preliminary phase ==
The preliminary phase legs took place on 5 and 26 November 2016. Vilafranca and Barcelos received a bye and qualified directly for the round of 16.

Team 1	Agg.	Team 2	1st leg	2nd leg
Coutras	1–7	Caldes	0–1	1–6
Wimmis	9–6	Dornbirn	2–4	7–2
Soham	1–15	Saint-Omer	1–7	0–8
Trissino	14–4	Düsseldorf-Nord	6–3	8–1
Viareggio	8–5	Vendrell	3–3	5–2
King's Lynn	2–29	Ploufragan	1–13	1–16
Igualada	14–3	Biasca	7–1	7–2
Wolfurt	6–17	Remscheid	2–9	4–8
Germania Herringen	5–7	Turquel	2–3	3–4
Walsum	6–5p	Uttigen	2–2	4–3p
Genève	11–12	Sarzana	5–6	6–6
Uri	4–10	Monza	1–4	3–6
Darmstadt	4–15	Juventude Viana	2–7	2–8
Noia	5–8	Follonica	1–2	4–6

== Knockout phase ==
Round of 16
Caldes	5	7	12
Wimmis	1	4	5
Saint-Omer	4	3	7
Trissino	3	5	8
Viareggio	7	4	11
Ploufragan	4	1	5
Igualada	11	6	17
Remscheid	1	3	4
Turquel	4	2	6
Walsum	0	5	5
Sarzana (g.g.)	6	4	10
Monza	4	5	9
Juventude Viana	3	2	5
Vilafranca (g.g.)	1	5	6
Follonica	1	2	3
Barcelos	3	3	6

Quarterfinals
Caldes	4	5	9
Trissino	3	2	5
Viareggio	4	4	8
Igualada	1	4	5
Turquel	2	2	4
Sarzana	2	3	5
Vilafranca	3	2	5
Barcelos	2	6	8

Final Four
Caldes	0
Viareggio	2
Sarzana	1
Barcelos	3

Final
Viareggio	2
Barcelos	4

== Final-Four ==
All times are Western European Time.

=== Semi-finals ===
30 April 2017
21:00

Caldes	0–2	Viareggio
	Report	13' Xavi Costa; 49' Xavi Rubio

PalaBarsacchi
Referee: Luís Peixoto and Joaquim Pinto
30 April 2017
18:30

Sarzana	1–3	Barcelos
19' (pen.) Davide Borsi	Report	18' Álvaro Morais; 20' Reinaldo Ventura; 26' Miguel Vieira

PalaBarsacchi
Referee: Óscar Valverde and Francisco García

=== Final ===
30 April 2017
20:00

Viareggio	2–4	Barcelos
5' Xavier Costa; 42' Mirko Bertolucci	Report	16' João Guimarães; 30' Hugo Costa; 41' Rúben Sousa; 48' Miguel Vieira

PalaBarsacchi
Referee: Óscar Valverde e Francisco García
