= Sporting CP (roller hockey) =

- Full name: Sporting Clube de Portugal
- League: 1ª Divisão
- Founded: 1923
- Home ground: Pavilhão João Rocha (Capacity 3,000)

Personnel
- Coach: Edo Bosch
- Owner: Sporting CP
- Chairman: Frederico Varandas
- Website: sporting.pt
Home	Away

Sporting Clube de Portugal (Portuguese pronunciation: [sɨˈpɔɾtĩ ˈkluβɨ ðɨ puɾtuˈɣal]), otherwise referred to as Sporting CP is a professional multi-sports club, with a roller hockey section, from Lisbon, Portugal. They compete in the Portuguese First Division, the top-tier league in the country, and dispute their home matches at João Rocha Arena. Roller Hockey at Sporting CP is highly successful and popular sports’ mobility followed, after its football department and the club being one of the biggest 4 teams' in Portugal. Due to the popularity of the sport and the success of the national side, many of Sporting's past and present players have represented Portugal many times over the years at international level.

In domestic competitions, they have won 9 league titles, 6 Portuguese Cups, 3 Portuguese Super Cups and two Portuguese Elite Cups. At international level, the team has won 1 WS Rink Hockey Clubs World Championship, 4 WSE Champions League titles, 2 WSE Cups, 3 CERH Cup Winners' Cups and 2 WSE Continental Cups. By winning the 2023-24 edition against FC Porto in the final four and UD Oliveirense in an all Portuguese final, Sporting CP are currently the most successful Portuguese side internationally and were the first Portuguese team to win the WSE Champions League (formally the Euroleague) in the 1976-77 edition and the first club to win the first club world Championship in the new format (Formally Intercontinental Cup).

== Facilities ==
=== Pavilhão João Rocha ===
Pavilhão João Rocha is a multi-sports arena located in Lisbon. Located next to the Estádio José Alvalade, it is the home of Sporting CP indoor sports teams and was named after former club president João Rocha.

== Honours ==
=== Domestic Competitions ===
- Portuguese First Division: 9

1938/1939, 1974/1975, 1975/1976, 1976/1977, 1977/1978, 1981/1982, 1987/1988, 2017/2018, 2020/2021

- Portuguese Roller Hockey Second Division: 3

1969/1970, 2003/2004, 2011/2012

- Portuguese Roller Hockey Third Division: 2

1999/2000, 2010/2011

- Portuguese Roller Hockey Cup: 6

1975/1976, 1976/1977, 1983/1984, 1989/1990, 2024/2025, 2025/2026

- Supertaça António Livramento: 3

1983, 2015, 2025

- Elite Cup: 2

2016, 2018

=== International Competitions ===
- Rink Hockey World Club Championship: 1

2025

- WSE Champions League: 4

1976/1977, 2018/2019, 2020/2021, 2023/2024

- WSE Cup: 2

1983/1984, 2014/2015

- CERH Cup Winners' Cup: 3

1980/1981, 1984/1985, 1990/1991

- WSE Continental Cup: 2

2019, 2021

== Current squad ==
As of 16 September 2023

Goalkeepers
- 61 (Portugal) Ângelo Girão (captain)
- 91 (Portugal) José Diogo

Defenders/Midfielders

- 17 (Argentina) Matías Platero
- 87 (Argentina) Facundo Bridge
- 88 (Portugal) Henrique Magalhães
- 99 (Argentina) Gonzalo Romero

Forwards

- 7 (Portugal) Rafael Bessa
- 9 (Spain) Ferran Font
- 14 (Italy) Alessandro Verona
- 44 (Portugal) João Souto
- 57 (Spain) Toni Pérez
