= CERH Cup Winners' Cup =

- Founded: 1976
- Abolished: 1996
- Region: Europe (CERH)
- Last champions: (Spain) HC Liceo (2nd title)
- Most successful team(s): (Portugal) AD Oeiras (Italy) Roller Monza (Portugal) Sporting CP (3 titles)

The CERH Cup Winners' Cup was a European club roller hockey competition organised annually by the Comité Européen de Rink-Hockey for domestic cup winners in each country. Created in 1976, it was merged with the European Cup in 1996 to form the CERH Champions League, which was renamed the CERH European League in 2005. HC Liceo were the competition's last winners.

The most successful teams in the competition were Sporting CP (from Portugal), AD Oeiras (also from Portugal) and Roller Monza (from Italy), with three wins apiece.

== Finals ==
Season	Winners	Runners-up	Score
1976–77	(Portugal) AD Oeiras	(Spain) CE Arenys de Munt	2–4 / 4–2 (1–0 pso)
1977–78	(Portugal) AD Oeiras	(Spain) CP Voltregà	3–2 / 3–3
1978–79	(Portugal) AD Oeiras	(Spain) CP Voltregà	10–1 / 3–6
1979–80	(Italy) AFP Giovinazzo	(Spain) HC Sentmenat	4–11 / 14–4
1980–81	(Portugal) Sporting CP	(Spain) CP Cibeles	1–4 / 5–2 (2–0 pso)
1981–82	(Portugal) Porto	(Portugal) Sporting CP	13–4 / 7–8
1982–83	(Portugal) Porto	(Portugal) Benfica	2–2 / 6–5
1983–84	(Spain) Reus Deportiu	(Portugal) Benfica	6–4 / 4–5
1984–85	(Portugal) Sporting CP	(Germany) RESG Walsum	1–1 / 8–4
1985–86	(Portugal) AD Sanjoanense	(Portugal) Sporting CP	3–3 / 9–6
1986–87	(Spain) FC Barcelona	(Italy) Hockey Novara	5–3 / 3–4
1987–88	(Spain) AA Noia	(Italy) Amatori Lodi	11–5 / 8–4
1988–89	(Italy) Roller Monza	(Portugal) Porto	7–3 / 3–6
1989–90	(Spain) HC Liceo	(Belgium) RH Rolta Louvain	9–2 / 22–1
1990–91	(Portugal) Sporting CP	(Italy) Hockey Novara	7–6 / 5–2
1991–92	(Italy) Roller Monza	(Spain) CP Voltregà	3–3 / 6–5
1992–93	(Portugal) OC Barcelos	(Switzerland) SC Thunerstern	8–0 / 6–3
1993–94	(Italy) Amatori Lodi	(Spain) CP Voltregà	4–3 / 6–2
1994–95	(Italy) Roller Monza	(Italy) Amatori Lodi	6–1 / 4–3
1995–96	(Spain) HC Liceo	(Italy) Amatori Lodi	2–5 / 5–2 (2–1 pso)

== Performances ==
=== By team ===
Team	W	Runners-up	Years won	Years runners-up
(Portugal) Sporting CP	3	2	1981, 1985, 1991	1982, 1986
(Portugal) AD Oeiras	3	0	1977, 1978, 1979	—
(Italy) Roller Monza	3	0	1989, 1992, 1995	—
(Portugal) Porto	2	1	1982, 1983	1989
(Spain) HC Liceo	2	0	1990, 1996	—
(Italy) Amatori Lodi	1	3	1994	1988, 1995, 1996
(Italy) AFP Giovinazzo	1	0	1980	—
(Spain) Reus Deportiu	1	0	1984	—
(Portugal) AD Sanjoanense	1	0	1986	—
(Spain) FC Barcelona	1	0	1987	—
(Spain) AA Noia	1	0	1988	—
(Portugal) OC Barcelos	1	0	1993	—
(Spain) CP Voltregà	0	4	—	1978, 1979, 1992, 1994
(Portugal) Benfica	0	2	—	1983, 1984
(Italy) Hockey Novara	0	2	—	1987, 1991
(Spain) CE Arenys de Munt	0	1	—	1977
(Spain) HC Sentmenat	0	1	—	1980
(Spain) CP Cibeles	0	1	—	1981
(Germany) RESG Walsum	0	1	—	1985
(Belgium) RH Rolta Louvain	0	1	—	1990
(Switzerland) SC Thunerstern	0	1	—	1993

=== By country ===
Country	Wins	Winning clubs	Runners-up	Losing clubs
Portugal	10	AD Oeiras (3), Sporting CP (3), Porto (2), AD Sanjoanense (1), OC Barcelos (1)	5	Sporting CP (2), Benfica (2), Porto (1)
Spain	5	HC Liceo (2), Reus Deportiu (1), FC Barcelona (1), AA Noia (1)	7	CP Voltregà (4), CE Arenys de Munt (1), HC Sentmenat (1), CP Cibeles (1)
Italy	5	Roller Monza (3), AFP Giovinazzo (1), Amatori Lodi (1)	5	Amatori Lodi (3), Hockey Novara (2)
Germany	0	—	1	RESG Walsum (1)
Belgium	0	—	1	RH Rolta Louvain (1)
Switzerland	0	—	1	SC Thunerstern (1)
