= Associação de Educação Física e Desportiva =

Física Basket
- Leagues: Liga Portuguesa de Basquetebol
- Arena: Pavilhão da Física
- Location: Torres Vedras, Portugal
- Team colors: Green, Red, Turquoise Blue and White.
- President: (Portugal) Luís Carlos Lopes
- Head coach: (Portugal) José Tavares
- Championships: 1 Proliga Championship
- Website: www.fisicatvedras.pt
Home	Away	Third

Associação Educação Física e Desportiva is a sports club from Torres Vedras, Portugal.

== Roller hockey ==
The team is currently playing in the Portuguese Roller Hockey First Division. For the first time in its history, the club played an international competition at the Cers Cup.

== Basketball ==
In the 2007–08 season, Física won the Portuguese Proliga, beating the Basketball team of Vitória 79–65 in the final.

=== Achievements ===
- Portuguese Proliga: 1

2007–08
