= Óquei Clube de Barcelos =

Óquei de Barcelos
- Full name: Óquei Clube de Barcelos H.P. SAD
- Short name: OCB
- League: 1ª Divisão
- Founded: 1948
- Colors: Blue and White
- Home ground: Pavilhão Municipal de Barcelos (2400 seats)

Personnel
- Coach: Rui Neto
- Chairman: Hugo Ricardo
- Website: facebook.com/ocbarcelos
Home	Away

Óquei Clube de Barcelos is a rink hockey team from Barcelos, Portugal. It is one of the most successful rink hockey teams in Portugal and Europe. It is known and referred to as "Óquei de Barcelos", "OCB", "OC Barcelos", or just "Barcelos".

== Foundation ==
The idea of creating a rink-hockey team was born in 1946 by a group of boys in Barcelos. Although the documentation shows that the team was founded on 22 December 1947, 1 January 1948 is considered the official foundation date of the club. The founders of the team were the Barcelos-born cousins Cândido Augusto Sousa Cunha and Simplício Cândido Monteiro de Sousa. The first game of the team was in 1948 in the ring of Pessegal against the Clube dos Ourives (Goldsmiths' Club), and OC Barcelos won by 5–2. In the first years, the hockey that was played was a mix of Field Hockey and Rink Hockey, because although the rules were similar to Rink Hockey, they didn't use skates. Rink hockey as it is played began in the club only in 1952.

=== Name ===
The cousins who founded the team were negotiating the cost of the first forms at a printing office for the team when a man approached them and suggested the name "Hockey Clube de Barcelos" to look more Portuguese, striking part of the word and writing "Óquei" so that it would look like "Hóquei". The printer misunderstood the instructions and made it "Óquei".

=== Logo ===
The logo consists of a coat of arms, divided in two equal parts by a line. The left side of it is the coat of arms of Barcelos and the right side has the initials of the club: OCB. There is a crown of castles and walls and a hockey stick crossing the logo from behind with a ball at the end.

== Achievements ==
=== National ===
- Portuguese Roller Hockey First Division: 3

1992–93, 1995–96, 2000–01

- Portuguese Roller Hockey Cup: 4

1991–92, 1992–93, 2002–03, 2003–04

- Supertaça António Livramento: 5

1994, 1999, 2003, 2004, 2024

- Elite Cup: 1

2021

=== International ===
- Intercontinental Cup: 1

1992

- WSE Champions League: 2

1990–91, 2024–25

- WSE Cup: 3

1994–95, 2015–16, 2016–17

- Cup Winners' Cup: 1

1992–93

- Continental Cup: 2

1991, 2025

- Ciudad de Vigo Tournament: 1

1991

== Other sports ==
Óquei de Barcelos used to have a successful table tennis team (now extinct) and also a volleyball team, created in 1950.

== See also ==
Rink Hockey

Rink Hockey Portuguese Championship 2005-06

Federação Portuguesa de Patinagem
