= Portuguese Roller Hockey First Division =

Sports league

- Current season, competition or edition: 2025–26 Portuguese Roller Hockey First Division
- Sport: Roller hockey
- Founded: 1938; 88 years ago
- Administrator: FPP
- No. of teams: 14
- Country: Portugal
- Confederation: WSE
- Most recent champion: Porto (26th title) (2024–25)
- Most titles: Porto (26 titles)
- Broadcaster: A Bola TV
- Relegation to: 2ª Divisão
- Domestic cups: Taça de Portugal; Supertaça; Elite Cup
- International cups: European League; European Cup
- Website: FPP.pt

The Portuguese Roller Hockey First Division (Portuguese: Campeonato Nacional da Primeira Divisão de Hóquei em Patins or simply 1ª Divisão; literally: Roller Hockey First Division National Championship) is the premier roller hockey league in Portugal. It was established in 1939 and Sporting CP were crowned as the first champions. Porto are the current champions and also the record winners, with 26 titles. The league is contested by 14 teams, with the top four teams qualifying for the following season's WSE Champions League and the fifth to eighth placed teams qualifying for the WSE Cup. The bottom three teams are relegated to the second-tier Portuguese Roller Hockey Second Division.

Location of teams in 1ª Divisão 2022–23

== Champions ==
Below are listed the champions, runners-up and third-placed teams per season. The cumulative number of titles is shown between brackets.

Season	Champion	Runner-up	Third place
1938–39	Sporting CP	Infante de Sagres	–
1939–40	Futebol Benfica	Infante de Sagres	–
1940–41	Futebol Benfica (2)	CD Paço d'Arcos	Estrela e Vigorosa
1941–42	CD Paço d'Arcos	Futebol Benfica	–
1942–43	Futebol Benfica (3)	Académico FC	CD Paço d'Arcos
1943–44	CD Paço d'Arcos (2)	HC Sintra	Académico FC
1944–45	CD Paço d'Arcos (3)	HC Sintra	Futebol Benfica
1945–46	CD Paço d'Arcos (4)	HC Sintra	Infante de Sagres
1946–47	CD Paço d'Arcos (5)	HC Sintra	Infante de Sagres
1947–48	CD Paço d'Arcos (6)	HC Sintra	Infante de Sagres
1948–49	HC Sintra	CD Paço d'Arcos	Benfica
1949–50	HC Sintra (2)	CD Paço d'Arcos	Benfica
1950–51	Benfica	CD Paço d'Arcos	HC Sintra
1951–52	Benfica (2)	CD Paço d'Arcos	HC Sintra
1952–53	CD Paço d'Arcos (7)	Campo de Ourique	Infante de Sagres
1953–54	Campo de Ourique	Benfica	CD Paço d'Arcos
1954–55	CD Paço d'Arcos (8)	Benfica	Campo de Ourique
1955–56	Benfica (3)	Infante de Sagres	Académico FC
1956–57	Benfica (4)	GDS Cascais	CD Paço d'Arcos
1957–58	HC Sintra (3)	CD Paço d'Arcos	
1958–59	HC Sintra (4)	Campo de Ourique	CD Paço d'Arcos
1959–60	Benfica (5)	CD Paço d'Arcos	Campo de Ourique
1960–61	Benfica (6)	Campo de Ourique	CD Paço d'Arcos
1961–62	CF Lourenço Marques (MOZ)	Benfica	Académico FC
1962–63	No championship disputed. (Note: Due to regional disputes about a new national league format, a Portuguese Cup was played instead in the 1962–63 and 1963–64 seasons.)		
1963–64	No championship disputed.		
1964–65	CUF	AD Oeiras	Campo de Ourique
1965–66	Benfica (7)	CF Lourenço Marques (MOZ)	Campo de Ourique
1966–67	Benfica (8)	CD Malhangalene (MOZ)	CF Lourenço Marques (MOZ)
1967–68	Benfica (9)	CF Lourenço Marques (MOZ)	Porto
1968–69	GD Lourenço Marques (MOZ)	Porto	Sport Luanda e Benfica (ANG)
1969–70	Benfica (10)	Porto	AA Moçambique (MOZ)
1970–71	GD Lourenço Marques (MOZ) (2)	CF Lourenço Marques (MOZ)	Banco Comercial de Angola (ANG)
1971–72	Benfica (11)	Banco Comercial de Angola (ANG)	CF Lourenço Marques (MOZ)
1972–73	GD Lourenço Marques (MOZ) (3)	Benfica	Banco Comercial de Angola (ANG)
1973–74	Benfica (12)	Infante de Sagres	Sporting CP
1974–75	Sporting CP (2)	Porto	AD Valongo
1975–76	Sporting CP (3)	Porto	AJ Salesiana
1976–77	Sporting CP (4)	AD Oeiras	AD Valongo
1977–78	Sporting CP (5)	AD Oeiras	Porto
1978–79	Benfica (13)	Porto	Infante de Sagres
1979–80	Benfica (14)	Sporting CP	AD Valongo
1980–81	Benfica (15)	Sporting CP	AD Valongo
1981–82	Sporting CP (6)	Benfica	Porto
1982–83	Porto	Benfica	Sporting CP
1983–84	Porto (2)	Sporting CP	Juventude de Viana
1984–85	Porto (3)	Sporting CP	AD Sanjoanense
1985–86	Porto (4)	Sporting CP	AD Sanjoanense
1986–87	Porto (5)	UD Oliveirense	Sporting CP
1987–88	Sporting CP (7)	Porto	CD Paço d'Arcos
1988–89	Porto (6)	OC Barcelos	Benfica
1989–90	Porto (7)	OC Barcelos	Benfica
1990–91	Porto (8)	OC Barcelos	Benfica
1991–92	Benfica (16)	Porto	OC Barcelos
1992–93	OC Barcelos	Porto	Benfica
1993–94	Benfica (17)	OC Barcelos	Porto
1994–95	Benfica (18)	OC Barcelos	Porto
1995–96	OC Barcelos (2)	Benfica	Porto
1996–97	Benfica (19)	OC Barcelos	UD Oliveirense
1997–98	Benfica (20)	Porto	CD Paço d'Arcos
1998–99	Porto (9)	OC Barcelos	Benfica
1999–2000	Porto (10)	OC Barcelos	Benfica
2000–01	OC Barcelos (3)	Benfica	Porto
2001–02	Porto (11)	Benfica	OC Barcelos
2002–03	Porto (12)	OC Barcelos	Benfica
2003–04	Porto (13)	OC Barcelos	UD Oliveirense
2004–05	Porto (14)	Benfica	UD Oliveirense
2005–06	Porto (15)	Benfica	OC Barcelos
2006–07	Porto (16)	Benfica	UD Oliveirense
2007–08	Porto (17)	Benfica	Juventude de Viana
2008–09	Porto (18)	Juventude de Viana	Benfica
2009–10	Porto (19)	Juventude de Viana	UD Oliveirense
2010–11	Porto (20)	Benfica	UD Oliveirense
2011–12	Benfica (21)	Porto	Candelária SC
2012–13	Porto (21)	Benfica	UD Oliveirense
2013–14	AD Valongo	Benfica	Porto
2014–15	Benfica (22)	Porto	UD Oliveirense
2015–16	Benfica (23)	Porto	UD Oliveirense
2016–17	Porto (22)	Benfica	UD Oliveirense
2017–18	Sporting CP (8)	Benfica	Porto
2018–19	Porto (23)	UD Oliveirense	Sporting CP
2019–20	Abandoned due to the COVID-19 pandemic		
2020–21	Sporting CP (9)	Porto	–
2021–22	Porto (24)	Benfica	–
2022–23	Benfica (24)	Sporting CP	–
2023–24	Porto (25)	Benfica	–
2024–25	Porto (26)	OC Barcelos	–
2025–26	Benfica (25)	Sporting CP	–

=== Performance by club ===
Club	Winners	Runners-up	Winning seasons
Porto	26	14	1982–83, 1983–84, 1984–85, 1985–86, 1986–87, 1988–89, 1989–90, 1990–91, 1998–99, 1999–2000, 2001–02, 2002–03, 2003–04, 2004–05, 2005–06, 2006–07, 2007–08, 2008–09, 2009–10, 2010–11, 2012–13, 2016–17, 2018–19, 2021–22, 2023–24, 2024–25
Benfica	25	20	1950–51, 1951–52, 1955–56, 1956–57, 1959–60, 1960–61, 1965–66, 1966–67, 1967–68, 1969–70, 1971–72, 1973–74, 1978–79, 1979–80, 1980–81, 1991–92, 1993–94, 1994–95, 1996–97, 1997–98, 2011–12, 2014–15, 2015–16, 2022–23, 2025–26
Sporting CP	9	6	1938–39, 1974–75, 1975–76, 1976–77, 1977–78, 1981–82, 1987–88, 2017–18, 2020–21
CD Paço d'Arcos	8	7	1941–42, 1943–44, 1944–45, 1945–46, 1946–47, 1947–48, 1952–53, 1954–55
HC Sintra	4	5	1948–49, 1949–50, 1957–58, 1958–59
OC Barcelos	3	11	1992–93, 1995–96, 2000–01
CF Benfica	3	1	1939–40, 1940–41, 1942–43
GD Lourenço Marques	3	0	1968–69, 1970–71, 1972–73
CA Campo de Ourique	1	3	1953–54
CF Lourenço Marques	1	3	1961–62
GD CUF	1	0	1964–65
AD Valongo	1	0	2013–14
Infante de Sagres	0	4	–
AD Oeiras	0	3	–
UD Oliveirense	0	2	–
Juventude de Viana	0	2	–
Académico FC	0	1	–
GDS Cascais	0	1	–
CD Malhangalene	0	1	–
Banco Comercial de Angola	0	1	–
