= Inter Continental Cup =

- Founded: 2008
- Region: International (FIFA)
- Number of teams: 8
- Current champions: Nigeria Olympic Team

The Inter Continental Cup - Malaysia 2008 was an invitational football tournament, staged in Kuala Lumpur from May 15 to May 25, 2008. The eight-nation tournament features the national Olympic teams (Under-23) that participated in that year's 2008 Summer Olympics in Beijing. The teams taking part were Nigeria, Australia, Croatia, Chile, Iraq, Ireland, Togo and hosts Malaysia.

All teams participated with their under-23 selection, except Croatia, which sent its under-21 team.

Argentina was scheduled to take part in the tournament, but withdrew later, replaced by fellow South American team Chile. Togo also replaced fellow African team Ghana who also withdrew from the tournament.

All the matches were played at the KLFA Stadium in Cheras, Kuala Lumpur and the MBPJ Stadium in Petaling Jaya, Selangor.

Nigeria were the champions of the tournament, beating Australia 2-0 in the final.

== Champions ==
Year	Winner	Score	Runner-up	Venue
Malaysia 2008	Nigeria Olympic Team	2 - 0	Australia Olympic Team	KLFA Stadium, Cheras, Kuala Lumpur, Malaysia
