= A.D. Sanjoanense (rink hockey) =

Portuguese rink hockey club

A. D. Sanjoanense
- Full name: Associação Desportiva Sanjoanense
- Founded: 1924
- League: First Division
- 2021/22: 12th
- Website: https://www.ads.pt/
Home colours	Away colours

Associação Desportiva Sanjoanense is a rink hockey club from São João da Madeira, Portugal.

== Honours ==
- Rink Hockey Cup Winners Cup: 1 (1985–86)

== See also ==
- A.D. Sanjoanense
