= U.D. Oliveirense (roller hockey) =

UD Oliveirense
- Full name: União Desportiva Oliveirense
- League: 1ª Divisão
- Founded: 25 October 1922
- Home ground: Pavilhão Dr. Salvador Machado; Oliveira de Azeméis, Portugal (Capacity 4,000)
- Website: udoliveirense.pt
Home	Away

União Desportiva Oliveirense is a roller hockey club from Oliveira de Azeméis, Portugal.

== History ==
After the first steps of the section in 1969, the club officially registered in the Portuguese Federation in 1970. In 1987 ended as runners-up of the Portuguese league and achieved their first Portuguese Cup. In 1997, Oliveirense achieved their first European cup by winning the CERS Cup.

In 2010, Oliveirense would start their golden era, by winning two consecutive national cups in 2011 and 2012. The club will also end as runner-up of the CERH European League in the seasons 2015–16 and 2016–17, being defeated by Benfica and Reus Deportiu in both editions.

Oliveirense would change their luck by beating Reus Deportiu in the final of the 2017 CERH Continental Cup, thus achieving their second European title.

== Achievements ==
=== National ===
- Portuguese Cup: 4

1996–97, 2010–11, 2011–12, 2018–19

=== International ===
- WSE Champions League:
  - runner-up: 2015–16, 2016–17, 2023–24
- CERS Cup: 1
  - 1996–97
- Continental Cup: 2
  - 2017, 2024
