= Associação Juventude de Viana =

Juventude de Viana
- Full name: Associação Juventude de Viana
- League: 1ª Divisão
- Founded: 1 December 1976 (49 years ago)
- Home ground: Pavilhão Municipal de Monserrate; Viana do Castelo; Portugal (Capacity 500)

Personnel
- Manager: Pedro Sampaio
- Website: juventudeviana.pt
Home	Away

Associação Juventude de Viana is a rink hockey club from Viana do Castelo, Portugal. Its senior team participates in the Portuguese Roller Hockey First Division. Juventude de Viana as is most commonly known was founded December 1, 1976, by six friends.
