= C.D. Paço d'Arcos =

Rink hockey club from Paço de Arcos, Portugal

CD Paço d'Arcos
- Full name: C.D. Paço d'Arcos
- League: 1ª Divisão
- Home ground: Paço de Arcos, Portugal

Personnel
- Manager: (Portugal) José Carlos Silva
- Website: cdpa.pt
Home	Away

Clube Desportivo Paço d'Arcos is a rink hockey club from Paço de Arcos, Portugal. Its senior team participates in the Portuguese Roller Hockey First Division.

== Honours ==
=== National ===
- Portuguese Roller Hockey First Division: 8

1942–43, 1944–45, 1945–46, 1946–47, 1947–48, 1948–49, 1953–54, 1955–55

=== International ===
- CERS Cup: 1

1999–00
