= Büren District =

Coordinates: 47.1333°N 7.36667°E

Büren District Amtsbezirk Büren
- District
- Flag Coat of arms

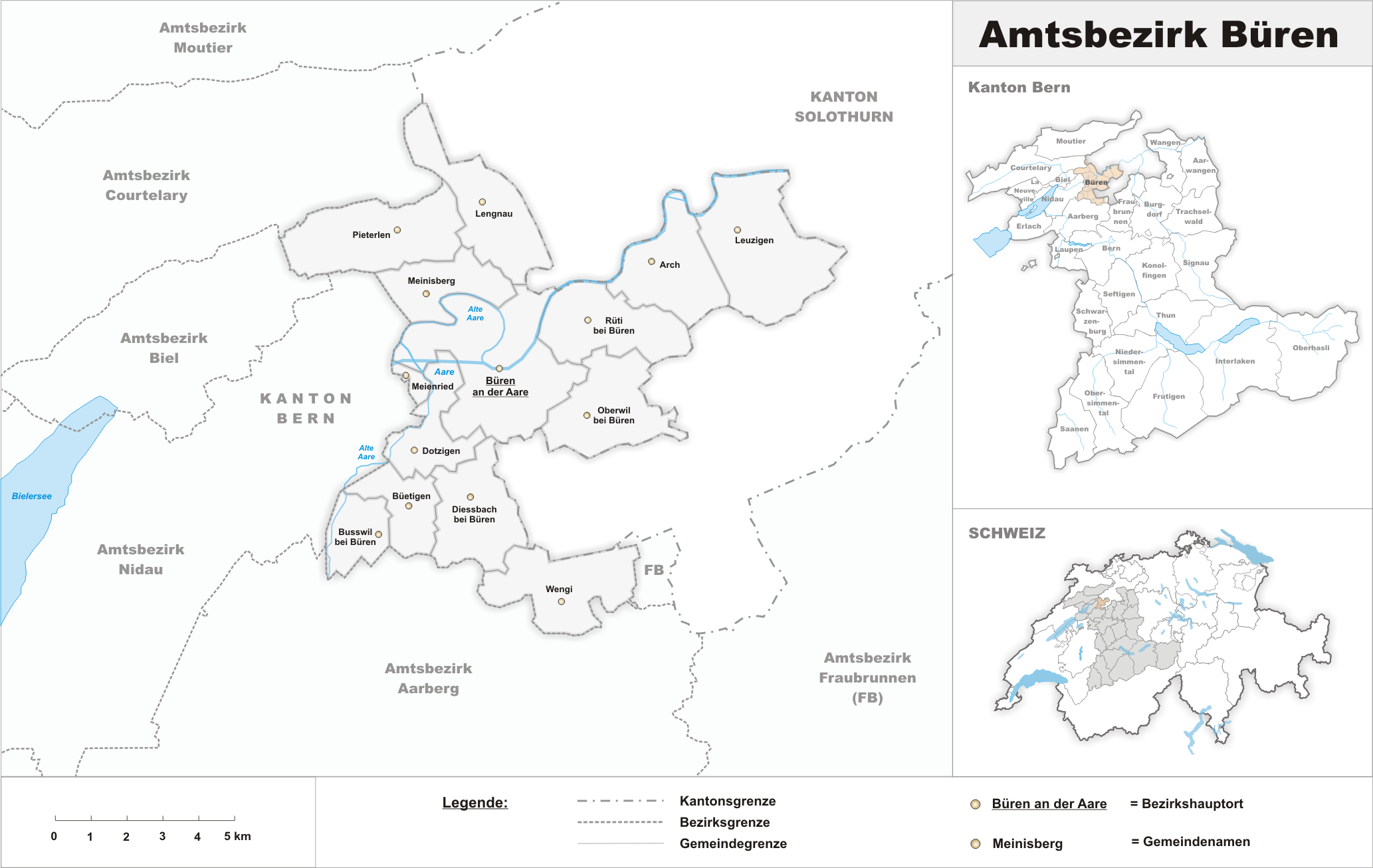
- Country: Switzerland
- Canton: Bern
- Capital: Büren an der Aare

Area
  - Total: 88 km^{2} (34 sq mi)

Population (2007)
  - Total: 22,226
  - Density: 250/km^{2} (650/sq mi)
- Time zone: UTC+1 (CET)
  - Summer (DST): UTC+2 (CEST)
- Municipalities: 14

Büren District is a constitutional district in the canton of Bern in Switzerland, with its capital at Büren an der Aare. It contains 14 municipalities in an area of 88 km²:

From 1 January 2010, the district lost its administrative power while being replaced by the Seeland, whose administrative centre is Aarberg. Since 2010, it remains a fully recognised district under the law and the Constitution (Art.3 al.2) of the Canton of Berne.

Municipality	Population (01.01.2004)	Area (km²)
Arch	1553	6.4
Büetigen	779	3.6
Büren an der Aare	3143	12.7
Busswil bei Büren	1930	3.1
Diessbach bei Büren	839	6.3
Dotzigen	1340	4.3
Lengnau	4437	7.3
Leuzigen	1151	10.3
Meienried	59	0.7
Meinisberg	1177	4.4
Oberwil bei Büren	763	6.7
Pieterlen	3270	8.3
Rüti bei Büren	864	6.5
Wengi	577	7.1
