= Josep Maria Bartomeu =

Spanish entrepreneur (born 1963)

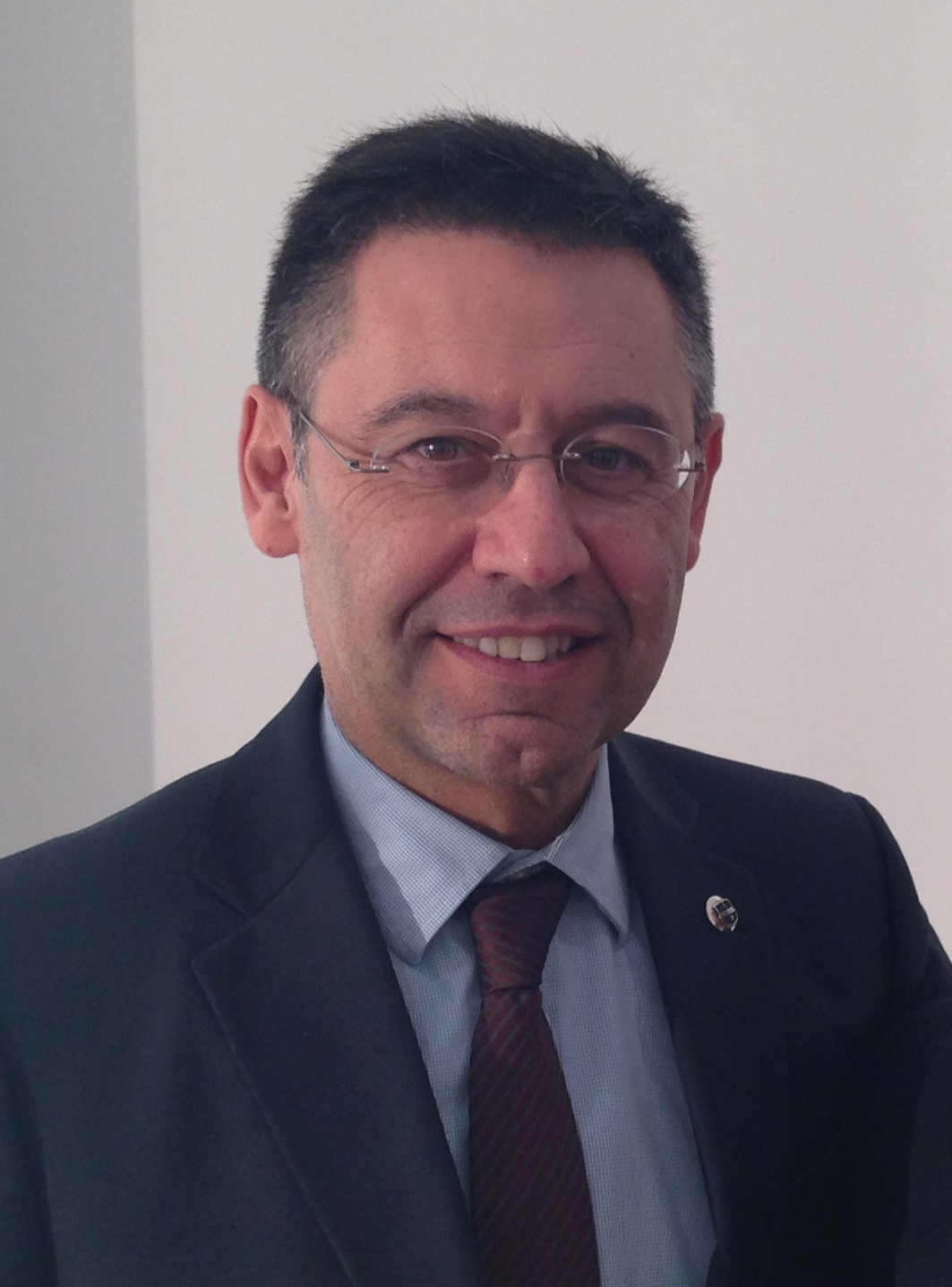
- Bartomeu in 2015

40th President of FC Barcelona
- In office 23 January 2014 – 27 October 2020
- Preceded by: Sandro Rosell
- Succeeded by: Carlos Tusquets (interim); Joan Laporta

Personal details
- Born: Josep Maria Bartomeu Floreta; 6 February 1963 (age 63) Barcelona, Catalonia, Spain
- Children: 2
- Education: ESADE
- Profession: Entrepreneur

Josep Maria Bartomeu Floreta (born 6 February 1963) is a Spanish entrepreneur and former president of FC Barcelona. He started his presidency in 2014, following the resignation of Sandro Rosell; he held the post until his resignation in 2020. He was replaced by interim Barcelona president Carlos Tusquets, and afterwards by election winner Joan Laporta.

== Career ==
Partner and CEO of the companies ADELTE and EFS, Bartomeu served on the board of Barcelona during Joan Laporta's presidency (as head of the basketball section) along with Sandro Rosell, who resigned due to differences with the then president. He then served as Rosell's vice-president of Barcelona from July 2010 to January 2014 after they won the election with 61.35% of the vote of the members of the club. Following the resignation of Sandro Rosell on 23 January 2014, due to the so-called "Neymar case", Bartomeu was, following the club's constitution, elected, as the fortieth President of Barcelona, to complete Rosell's term.

On 27 October 2020, Bartomeu announced his resignation, along with the entire board of directors.

== Tax fraud allegations ==
Bartomeu was investigated in a case of alleged tax fraud over the signing of forward Neymar, along with former president Sandro Rosell. He was set to stand trial after his appeal was rejected. After a further appeal, it was reported that Bartomeu would not stand trial over the allegations; Rosell and Barcelona were similarly cleared. The thorough research at the Camp Nou offices on Monday morning, carried out by the Mossos d'Esquadra (Catalonia police force), led to the arrest of Bartomeu, alongside the chief executive officer of the club, Oscar Grau, former adviser to the presidency Jaume Masferrer, and head of legal counsel Roman Gomez Ponti.

== Controversy ==
In March 2021, he was investigated by Catalan police, due to an alleged defamation campaign against Barcelona, known as Barçagate. Bartomeu was accused of hiring I3 Ventures to improve the club's image on social media and was accused of launching a smear campaign against some of the club's star players.

== Trophies won by club during presidency ==
=== Football ===
Barcelona:

- La Liga:
  - 2014–15, 2015–16, 2017–18, 2018–19
- Copa del Rey:
  - 2014–15, 2015–16, 2016–17, 2017–18
- Supercopa de España:
  - 2016, 2018
- UEFA Champions League:
  - 2014–15
- UEFA Super Cup:
  - 2015
- FIFA Club World Cup:
  - 2015

Barcelona Femení:

- Primera División (women):
  - 2013–14, 2014–15, 2019–20
- Copa de la Reina de Fútbol:
  - 2014, 2017

=== Futsal ===
Barcelona Futsal:

- Primera División:
  - 2018–19
- Copa del Rey de Futsal:
  - 2013–14
- Copa de España (LNFS):
  - 2019
- UEFA Futsal Cup:
  - 2013–14

=== Beach soccer ===
Barcelona Beach Soccer:

- Mundialito de Clubes:
  - 2015

=== Basketball ===
Barcelona Basketball:

- Liga ACB:
  - 2013–14
- Copa del Rey de Baloncesto:
  - 2018, 2019
- Supercopa de España de Baloncesto:
  - 2015

=== Handball ===
Barcelona Handbol:

- Liga ASOBAL:
  - 2013–14, 2014–15, 2015–16, 2016–17, 2017–18, 2018–19
- Copa del Rey de Balonmano:
  - 2014–15, 2015–16, 2016–17, 2017–18, 2018–19
- Copa ASOBAL:
  - 2014–15, 2015–16, 2016–17, 2017–18, 2018–19
- Supercopa ASOBAL:
  - 2014–15, 2015–16, 2016–17, 2017–2018, 2018–19
- EHF Champions League:
  - 2014–15
- IHF Men's Super Globe:
  - 2014, 2017, 2018, 2019

=== Roller hockey ===
Barcelona Roller Hockey:

- OK Liga:
  - 2013–14, 2014–15, 2015–16, 2016–17, 2017–18, 2018–19, 2019–20
- Copa del Rey de Hockey Patines:
  - 2016, 2017, 2018, 2019
- Supercopa de España de Hockey Patines:
  - 2014, 2015, 2017
- CERH European League:
  - 2013–14, 2014–15, 2017–18
- CERH Continental Cup:
  - 2015, 2018
- Roller Hockey Intercontinental Cup:
  - 2014, 2018

=== Ice hockey ===
Barcelona Ice Hockey:

- Spanish ice hockey cups:
  - 2014–15, 2018–19
