= 2014–15 CERH European League =

Tournament details
- Dates: 18 October 2014 – 3 May 2015
- Teams: 16 (from 6 associations)

Final positions
- Champions: (Spain) Barcelona (21st title)
- Runners-up: (Spain) Vic

Tournament statistics
- Matches played: 59
- Goals scored: 537 (9.1 per match)

The 2014–15 CERH European League was the 50th season of Europe's premier club roller hockey tournament organised by CERH, and the 19th season since it was renamed from the European Champion Clubs' Cup to the CERH Champions League/European League.

The final four tournament was played at PalaSind in Bassano del Grappa, Italy. Holders Barcelona defeated fellow Spanish side Vic 4–3 in the final to retain the title and extend their competition record to 21 wins.

== Teams ==
League positions of the previous season shown in parentheses (TH: Title holders, CW: Cup winners, LSF: Losing semi-finalists).

Group stage
| (Spain) Barcelona^{TH} (1st) | (Portugal) Porto (3rd) | (France) Dinan Quévert (1st) |
| (Spain) Liceo La Coruña (2nd) | (Portugal) Juventude de Viana (4th) | (France) La Vendéenne (2nd) |
| (Spain) Vic (3rd) | (Italy) Forte dei Marmi (1st) | (Germany) Herringen (1st) |
| (Spain) Vendrell (CW) | (Italy) Valdagno (2nd) | (Switzerland) Genève (1st) |
| (Portugal) Valongo (1st) | (Italy) Bassano (LSF) | |
| (Portugal) Benfica (2nd) | (Italy) Breganze (LSF) | |

== Round dates ==
The schedule of the competition is as follows (draw held at CERH headquarters in Lisbon, Portugal, on 6 September 2014).

| Phase | Round | First leg | Second leg |
|---|---|---|---|
| Group stage | Matchday 1 | 18 October 2014 | |
| Group stage | Matchday 2 | 1 November 2014 | |
| Group stage | Matchday 3 | 22 November 2014 | |
| Group stage | Matchday 4 | 13 December 2014 | |
| Group stage | Matchday 5 | 17 January 2015 | |
| Group stage | Matchday 6 | 7 February 2015 | |
| Knockout phase | Quarter-finals | 7 March 2015 | 21 March 2015 |
| Knockout phase | Semi-finals | 2 May 2015 | |
| Knockout phase | Final | 3 May 2015 | |

== Group stage ==
The draw for the group stage was held in Lisbon on 6 September 2014. The 16 teams were allocated into four pots, with the title holders being placed in Pot 1 automatically. The team were then drawn into four groups of four, with the restriction that teams from the same association could not be drawn against each other. In each group, teams play against each other home-and-away in a round-robin format. The matchdays are 18 October, 1 November, 22 November, 13 December 2014, 17 January, and 7 February 2015. The group winners and runners-up advance to the quarter-finals.

A total of six national associations are represented in the group stage. Juventude de Viana, Forte dei Marmi, Hockey Breganze and La Vendéenne all made their debut appearances in this phase.

=== Group A ===
| Pos | Team | Pld | W | D | L | GF | GA | GD | Pts | Qualification | BAR | BEN | BAS | QUE |
|---|---|---|---|---|---|---|---|---|---|---|---|---|---|---|
| 1 | (Spain) Barcelona | 6 | 5 | 1 | 0 | 32 | 10 | +22 | 16 | Advance to knockout phase | — | 1–1 | 6–3 | 9–2 |
| 2 | (Portugal) Benfica | 6 | 4 | 1 | 1 | 31 | 20 | +11 | 13 | Advance to knockout phase | 1–3 | — | 7–3 | 5–2 |
| 3 | (Italy) Bassano | 6 | 2 | 0 | 4 | 24 | 33 | −9 | 6 | | 3–6 | 6–8 | — | 6–5 |
| 4 | (France) Quévert | 6 | 0 | 0 | 6 | 15 | 39 | −24 | 0 | | 0–7 | 5–9 | 1–3 | — |

Source: CERH

=== Group B ===
| Pos | Team | Pld | W | D | L | GF | GA | GD | Pts | Qualification | VIC | BRE | VAL | GEN |
|---|---|---|---|---|---|---|---|---|---|---|---|---|---|---|
| 1 | (Spain) Vic | 6 | 5 | 1 | 0 | 27 | 13 | +14 | 16 | Advance to knockout phase | — | 2–1 | 3–2 | 3–1 |
| 2 | (Italy) Breganze | 6 | 4 | 1 | 1 | 28 | 19 | +9 | 13 | Advance to knockout phase | 3–3 | — | 5–3 | 7–2 |
| 3 | (Portugal) Valongo | 6 | 1 | 1 | 4 | 25 | 33 | −8 | 4 | | 3–8 | 4–6 | — | 5–5 |
| 4 | (Switzerland) Genève | 6 | 0 | 1 | 5 | 22 | 37 | −15 | 1 | | 3–8 | 5–6 | 6–8 | — |

Source: CERH

=== Group C ===
| Pos | Team | Pld | W | D | L | GF | GA | GD | Pts | Qualification | FOR | LIC | JUV | HER |
|---|---|---|---|---|---|---|---|---|---|---|---|---|---|---|
| 1 | (Italy) Forte dei Marmi | 6 | 5 | 0 | 1 | 48 | 37 | +11 | 15 | Advance to knockout phase | — | 11–6 | 6–2 | 9–7 |
| 2 | (Spain) Liceo La Coruña | 6 | 4 | 0 | 2 | 39 | 33 | +6 | 12 | Advance to knockout phase | 7–8 | — | 8–4 | 9–5 |
| 3 | (Portugal) Juventude de Viana | 6 | 2 | 1 | 3 | 31 | 31 | 0 | 7 | | 8–3 | 3–5 | — | 6–1 |
| 4 | (Germany) Herringen | 6 | 0 | 1 | 5 | 30 | 47 | −17 | 1 | | 7–11 | 2–4 | 8–8 | — |

Source: CERH

=== Group D ===
| Pos | Team | Pld | W | D | L | GF | GA | GD | Pts | Qualification | POR | VAL | LAV | VEN |
|---|---|---|---|---|---|---|---|---|---|---|---|---|---|---|
| 1 | (Portugal) Porto | 6 | 5 | 1 | 0 | 41 | 19 | +22 | 16 | Advance to knockout phase | — | 6–2 | 7–1 | 9–1 |
| 2 | (Italy) Valdagno | 6 | 2 | 2 | 2 | 30 | 24 | +6 | 8 | Advance to knockout phase | 5–5 | — | 10–3 | 7–2 |
| 3 | (France) La Vendéenne | 6 | 2 | 0 | 4 | 21 | 33 | −12 | 6 | | 3–5 | 6–4 | — | 5–3 |
| 4 | (Spain) Vendrell | 6 | 1 | 1 | 4 | 19 | 35 | −16 | 4 | | 7–9 | 2–2 | 4–3 | — |

Source: CERH

== Knockout phase ==
The knockout phase comprises a quarter-final round and the final four tournament. In the quarter-finals, group stage winners will play against group stage runners-up, the latter hosting the first of two legs. The winners qualify for the final four, which tookplace at the ground of one of the four finalists.

=== Quarter-finals ===
The first-leg matches were played on 7 March, and the second-leg matches were played on 21 March 2015.

| Team 1 | Agg. | Team 2 | 1st leg | 2nd leg |
|---|---|---|---|---|
| Valdagno (Italy) | 7–14 | (Spain) Barcelona | 2–6 | 5–8 |
| Liceo La Coruña (Spain) | 4–5 | (Spain) Vic | 2–2 | 2–3 (a.e.t.) |
| Breganze (Italy) | 9–6 | (Italy) Forte dei Marmi | 5–2 | 4–4 |
| Benfica (Portugal) | 5–6 | (Portugal) Porto | 3–3 | 2–3 |

=== Final four ===
The final four tournament took place on 2 and 3 May 2015, and was hosted by Hockey Breganze at PalaSind, in Bassano del Grappa. All times in CEST.

==== Semi-finals ====
2 May 2015
17:00

| Vic (Spain) | 3–2 (a.e.t.) | (Portugal) Porto |

PalaSind, Bassano del Grappa
Referee: Alessandro Eccelsi, Franco Ferrari (Italy)
2 May 2015
20:30

| Barcelona (Spain) | 5–1 | (Italy) Breganze |

PalaSind, Bassano del Grappa
Referee: Miguel Guilherme, Rui Torres (Portugal)

==== Final ====
3 May 2015
17:00

| Barcelona (Spain) | 4–3 | (Spain) Vic |

PalaSind, Bassano del Grappa
Referee: Alessandro da Prato, Mateo Galoppi (Italy)

2014–15 CERH European League winners
(Spain)
Barcelona
21st title

== See also ==
- 2014 CERH Continental Cup
- 2014 FIRS Intercontinental Cup
- 2014–15 CERS Cup
- 2014–15 CERH Women's European League
