= CE Vendrell =

- Full name: Club d'Esports Vendrell
- League: OK Liga
- Founded: 1913; 113 years ago (sports club); 1958; 68 years ago (rink hockey section)
- Home ground: Pavelló del CE Vendrell, El Vendrell; Catalonia, Spain

Personnel
- Chairman: (Spain) Víctor Romagosa
- Manager: (Spain) Josep Lluis Delriu
Home

Club d'Esports Vendrell, also known as Moritz Vendrell for sponsorship reasons, is a Spanish sports club based in El Vendrell, in the autonomous community of Catalonia. Founded in 1913, the club is commonly known by its roller hockey section that plays in the OK Liga.

== History ==
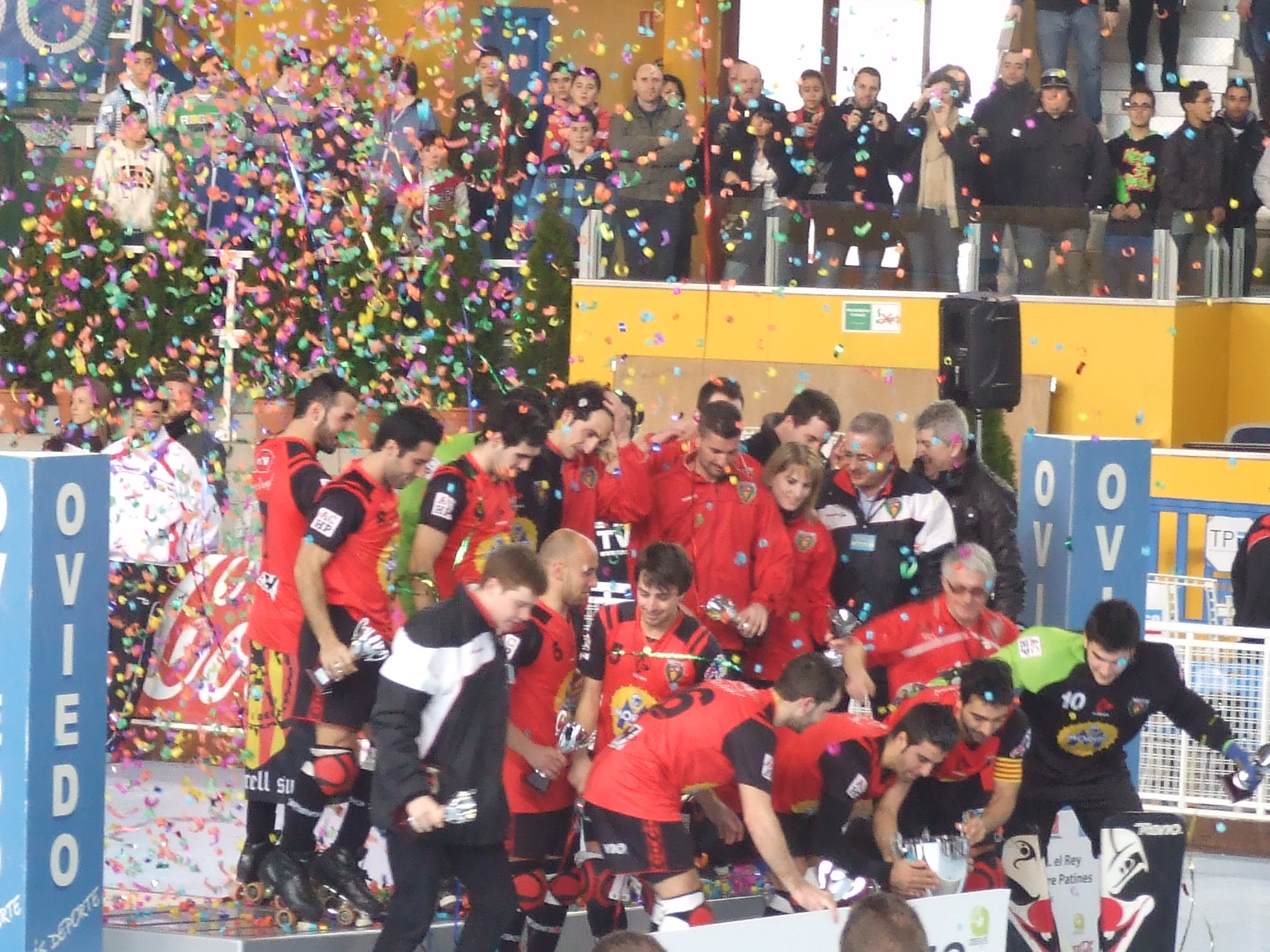
Vendrell players celebrate the 2013 Copa del Rey, the club's first title.

Founded in 1913, Vendrell incorporated a rink hockey section in 1958. In 1976 it promoted for the first time to the first division.

In 2010, the club started its golden years by promoting again to OK Liga. Three years later, Vendrell won its first title ever by winning the Copa del Rey. In that 2013, it also conquered its first continental title by achieving the CERS Cup.

In 2014, the club made its debut in the top continental tournament, the CERH European League and also re-conquered the Spanish cup. In the next season, Vendrell participated in the Final Four of the European League.

== Season to season ==
Season	Tier	Division	Pos.	Copa del Rey	Supercopa	Europe	
2007–08	3	Nacional	1st				
2008–09	2	1ª División	13th				
2009–10	2	1ª División	2nd				
2010–11	1	OK Liga	9th	Quarterfinalist			
2011–12	1	OK Liga	7th	Quarterfinalist		2 CERS Cup	SF
2012–13	1	OK Liga	3rd	Champion		2 CERS Cup	C
2013–14	1	OK Liga	5th	Champion	Semifinalist	1 European League	SF
2014–15	1	OK Liga	3rd	Quarterfinalist	Semifinalist	1 European League	GS
2015–16	1	OK Liga	5th		Semifinalist	1 European League	QF
2016–17	1	OK Liga	6th	Quarterfinalist		2 CERS Cup	PR
2017–18	1	OK Liga	10th			2 CERS Cup	R16
2018–19	1	OK Liga	14th				

== Trophies ==
- Copa del Rey: 2
  - 2013, 2014
- CERS Cup: 1
  - 2013
