= Barçagate =

Spanish football scandal

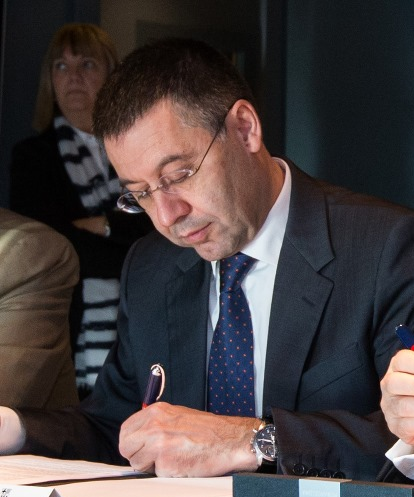
FC Barcelona president Josep Maria Bartomeu in 2014

The I3 Ventures case, also known as Barçagate or Bartogate, was a social media defamation campaign allegedly conducted by the leadership of FC Barcelona against a number of figures associated with the club. The allegations were revealed on 17 February 2020 by journalists Adrià Soldevila and Sergi Escudero on the radio show Què T'hi Jugues on Cadena SER. The alleged defamation campaign involved hiring social media company I3 Ventures SL to manipulate public opinion online, carried out through dozens of unofficial accounts associated with the club, in order to protect the image of Josep Maria Bartomeu – then-president of the club – and to attack other prominent figures both within the club and in Catalan public life more broadly.

Alleged targets of the defamation campaign included then-active players including Lionel Messi and Gerard Piqué, former players such as Xavi, Carles Puyol and Pep Guardiola, and other influential figures in the club's management including Víctor Font (a potential rival for the presidency of the club), Joan Laporta and Jaume Roures. Further alleged targets included political figures and organisations associated with the Catalan independence movement such as Quim Torra, Carles Puigdemont, Òmnium Cultural, the Assemblea Nacional Catalana and the Democratic Tsunami.

== Timeline of events ==
Initially, Barcelona FC's board of directors denied hiring I3 Ventures for any social media campaigns aimed at enhancing the image of the board or targeting others. However, on the same day that the case was publicised, club president Bartomeu announced the termination of the club's contract with I3 Ventures. He acknowledged that the company's contract with the club had been in place since 2017, but according to his statements on the matter the purpose of the contract was to monitor information published about the club on social media.

On 1 March 2021, Catalan police raided the club's offices in a search and seizure operation; in addition, Bartomeu, his adviser Jaume Masferrer, CEO Oscar Grau and Head of Legal Services Roman Gomez Bonti were arrested. Bartomeu admitted that he had hired I3 Ventures to improve Barcelona's image on social media, but denied that he intended to damage the reputation of individuals. The social media company was paid €980,000 for the campaign. On the same day, FC Barcelona released a statement in which they declared that the information and documentation requested by the police force related strictly to the case in question, pertaining to "the cont[r]acting of monitoring services on social networks".

== See also ==
- Negreira case
