= 2017–18 CERS Cup =

Tournament details
- Teams: 32 (from 8 associations)

The 2017–18 CERS Cup is the 38th season of the CERS Cup, Europe's second club roller hockey competition organized by CERH.

== Format ==
All the thirty two teams will play a double-legged knockout tournament with the only rule of avoiding that two teams from the same nation play together in the first round.

== Teams ==
Thirty two teams from eight national associations qualified for the competition and were confirmed on 19 September 2017. League positions of the previous season shown in parentheses.

Participating teams
(France) Saint-Omer (3rd)	(Germany) Darmstadt (5th)	(Spain) Vendrell (6th)	(Switzerland) Genève (2nd)
(France) Mérignac (4th)	(Germany) Düsseldorf-Nord (6th)	(Spain) Igualada (7th)	(Switzerland) Diessbach (3rd)
(France) Coutras (5th)	(Portugal) Barcelos ^{TH} (5th)	(Spain) Noia (8th)	(Switzerland) Uttigen (6th)
(France) Nantes (6th)	(Portugal) Juventude Viana (6th)	(Spain) Lleida Llista Blava (9th)	(Switzerland) Uri (7th)
(France) Noisy le Grand (7th)	(Portugal) Valença (8th)	(Italy) Breganze (6th)	(Austria) Dornbirn (1st)
(Germany) Remscheid (2nd)	(Portugal) Turquel (9th)	(Italy) Valdagno (7th)	(Austria) Wolfurt (2nd)
(Germany) Walsum (3rd)	(Portugal) Sporting Tomar (10th)	(Italy) Sarzana (8th)	(England) Herne Bay (2nd)
(Germany) Germania Herringen (4th)	(Spain) Voltregà (5th)	(Italy) Correggio (11th)	(England) Soham (3rd)

== Bracket ==
The draw was held at CERH headquarters in Lisbon, Portugal, on 23 September 2017.

Round of 32
(Italy) Sarzana	1	2	3
(Spain) Igualada	3	6	9
(Germany) Walsum	3	2	5
(Spain) Lleida Llista Blava	5	7	12
(Italy) Valdagno	4	6	10
(Germany) Germania Herringen	2	4	6
(Portugal) Sporting Tomar	4	6	10
(France) Mérignac	4	1	5
(Switzerland) Genève	3	2	5
(Portugal) Turquel	5	1	6
(Switzerland) Diessbach	6	3	9
(France) Saint-Omer	3	7	10
(France) Nantes	2	1	3
(Italy) Breganze	4	6	10
(England) Herne Bay	3	2	5
(Austria) Dornbirn	10	7	17
(England) Soham	1	1	2
(France) Noisy le Grand	4	4	8
(Switzerland) Uri	1	5	6
(Italy) Correggio	6	6	12
(Germany) Remscheid	4	1	5
(Spain) Voltregà	6	8	14
(Portugal) Valença	5	3	8
(Austria) Wolfurt	1	3	4
(France) Coutras	3	2	5
(Spain) Vendrell	5	5	10
(Portugal) Juventude Viana	7	6	13
(Germany) Düsseldorf-Nord	1	0	1
(Spain) Noia	11	10	21
(Germany) Darmstadt	2	3	5
(Portugal) Barcelos	12	10	22
(Switzerland) Uttigen	3	6	9

Round of 16
(Spain) Igualada	4	1	5
(Spain) Lleida Llista Blava	3	4	7
(Italy) Valdagno	6	0	6
(Portugal) Sporting Tomar (p)	6	0	6
(Portugal) Turquel	2	5	7
(France) Saint-Omer	1	2	3
(Italy) Breganze	9	9	18
(Austria) Dornbirn	2	2	4
(France) Noisy le Grand	2	4	6
(Italy) Correggio	2	7	9
(Spain) Voltregà	5	1	6
(Portugal) Valença	1	2	3
(Spain) Vendrell	3	1	4
(Portugal) Juventude Viana	1	4	5
(Spain) Noia	1	1	2
(Portugal) Barcelos	1	3	4

Quarterfinals
(Spain) Lleida Llista Blava	4	4	8
(Portugal) Sporting Tomar	2	4	6
(Portugal) Turquel	4	3	7
(Italy) Breganze	5	4	9
(Italy) Correggio	6	3	9
(Spain) Voltregà	6	4	10
(Portugal) Juventude Viana	2	3	5
(Portugal) Barcelos	5	4	9

Semifinals
(Spain) Lleida Llista Blava (aet)	4
(Italy) Breganze	3
(Spain) Voltregà	2
(Portugal) Barcelos	5

Final
(Spain) Lleida Llista Blava (p)	2 (1)
(Portugal) Barcelos	2 (0)

== Round of 32 ==
The first leg was played on 4 November and the second leg on 23 November 2017.

Team 1	Agg.	Team 2	1st leg	2nd leg
Valdagno (Italy)	10–6	(Germany) Germania Herringen	4–2	6–4
Uri (Switzerland)	6–12	(Italy) Correggio	1–6	5–6
Sarzana (Italy)	3–9	(Spain) Igualada	1–3	2–6
Valença (Portugal)	8–4	(Austria) Wolfurt	5–1	3–3
Sporting Tomar (Portugal)	10–5	(France) Mérignac	4–4	6–1
Diessbach (Switzerland)	9–10	(France) Saint-Omer	6–3	3–7
Walsum (Germany)	5–12	(Spain) Lleida Llista Blava	3–5	2–7
Remscheid (Germany)	5–14	(Spain) Voltregà	4–6	1–8
Barcelos (Portugal)	22–9	(Switzerland) Uttigen	12–3	10–6
Noia (Spain)	21–5	(Germany) Darmstadt	11–2	10–3
Coutras (France)	5–10	(Spain) Vendrell	3–5	2–5
Nantes (France)	3–10	(Italy) Breganze	2–4	1–6
Genève (Switzerland)	5–6	(Portugal) Turquel	3–5	2–1
Juventude Viana (Portugal)	13–1	(Germany) Düsseldorf-Nord	7–1	6–0
Soham (England)	2–8	(France) Noisy le Grand	1–4	1–4
Herne Bay (England)	5–17	(Austria) Dornbirn	3–10	2–7

== Round of 16 ==
The first leg was played on 9 December 2017 and the second leg on 13 January 2018.

Team 1	Agg.	Team 2	1st leg	2nd leg
Noia (Spain)	2–4	(Portugal) Barcelos	1–1	1–3
Breganze (Italy)	18–4	(Austria) Dornbirn	9–2	9–2
Turquel (Portugal)	7–3	(France) Saint-Omer	2–1	5–2
Igualada (Spain)	5–7	(Spain) Lleida Llista Blava	4–3	1–4
Vendrell (Spain)	4–5	(Portugal) Juventude Viana	3–1	1–4
Noisy le Grand (France)	6–9	(Italy) Correggio	2–2	4–7
Voltregà (Spain)	6–3	(Portugal) Valença	5–1	1–2
Valdagno (Italy)	6–6 (0–3 p)	(Portugal) Sporting Tomar	6–6	0–0

== Quarterfinals ==
The first leg will be played on 17 February 2017 and the second leg on 10 March 2018.

Team 1	Agg.	Team 2	1st leg	2nd leg
Juventude Viana (Portugal)	5–9	(Portugal) Barcelos	2–5	3–4
Correggio (Italy)	9–10	(Spain) Voltregà	6–6	3–4
Lleida Llista Blava (Spain)	8–6	(Portugal) Sporting Tomar	4–2	4–4
Turquel (Portugal)	7–9	(Italy) Breganze	4–5	3–4

== Final Four ==
The Final Four will be played on 28 and 29 April in Lleida, Spain.

=== Bracket ===
Semifinals
(Spain) Lleida Llista Blava (aet)	4
(Italy) Breganze	3
(Spain) Voltregà	2
(Portugal) Barcelos	5

Final
(Spain) Lleida Llista Blava (p)	2 (1)
(Portugal) Barcelos	2 (0)

=== Semifinals ===
28 April 2018
18:30 (CEST)

Voltregà (Spain)	2–5	(Portugal) Barcelos
Aleix Molas 39'; Eric Vargas 41'	Report	José Pereira 3' (d.f.); João Almeida 8', 47'; Rubén de Sousa 13' (pen.); Juan José López 49'

Pavelló Onze de Setembre, Lleida
Referee: Joseph Silecchia (ITA), Xavier Bleuzen (FRA)

28 April 2018
21:00 (CEST)

Lleida Llista Blava (Spain)	4–3 (a.e.t.)	(Italy) Breganze
Darío Giménez 7'; Andreu Tomàs 8'; Roberto di Benedetto 40' (d.f.); Joan Cañellas 60'	Report	Álvaro Giménez 45'; Emanuel Platero 46'; Federico Ambrosio 48'

Pavelló Onze de Setembre, Lleida
Referee: Luís Peixoto (POR), Miguel Guilherme (POR)

=== Final ===
29 April 2018
18:00 (CEST)

Lleida Llista Blava (Spain)	2–2 (a.e.t.)	(Portugal) Barcelos
Andreu Tomàs 35' (pen.); Dario Giménez 41' (d.f.)	Report	João Guimarães 18'; João Almeida 32'
Penalties
Andreu Tomàs (penalty missed); César Candanedo (penalty missed); Jordi Creus (penalty scored); Darío Giménez (penalty missed); Roberto di Benedetto (penalty missed)	1–0	(penalty missed) Rubén de Sousa; (penalty missed) Juan José López; (penalty missed) João Guimarães; (penalty missed) José Pereira; (penalty missed) Mário Rodrigues

Pavelló Onze de Setembre, Lleida
Referee: Xavier Bleuzen (FRA), Julien Thibaud (FRA)

== See also ==
- 2017–18 CERH European League
- 2017 CERH Continental Cup
- 2017–18 CERH Women's European Cup
