= Diessbach bei Büren =

- Municipality
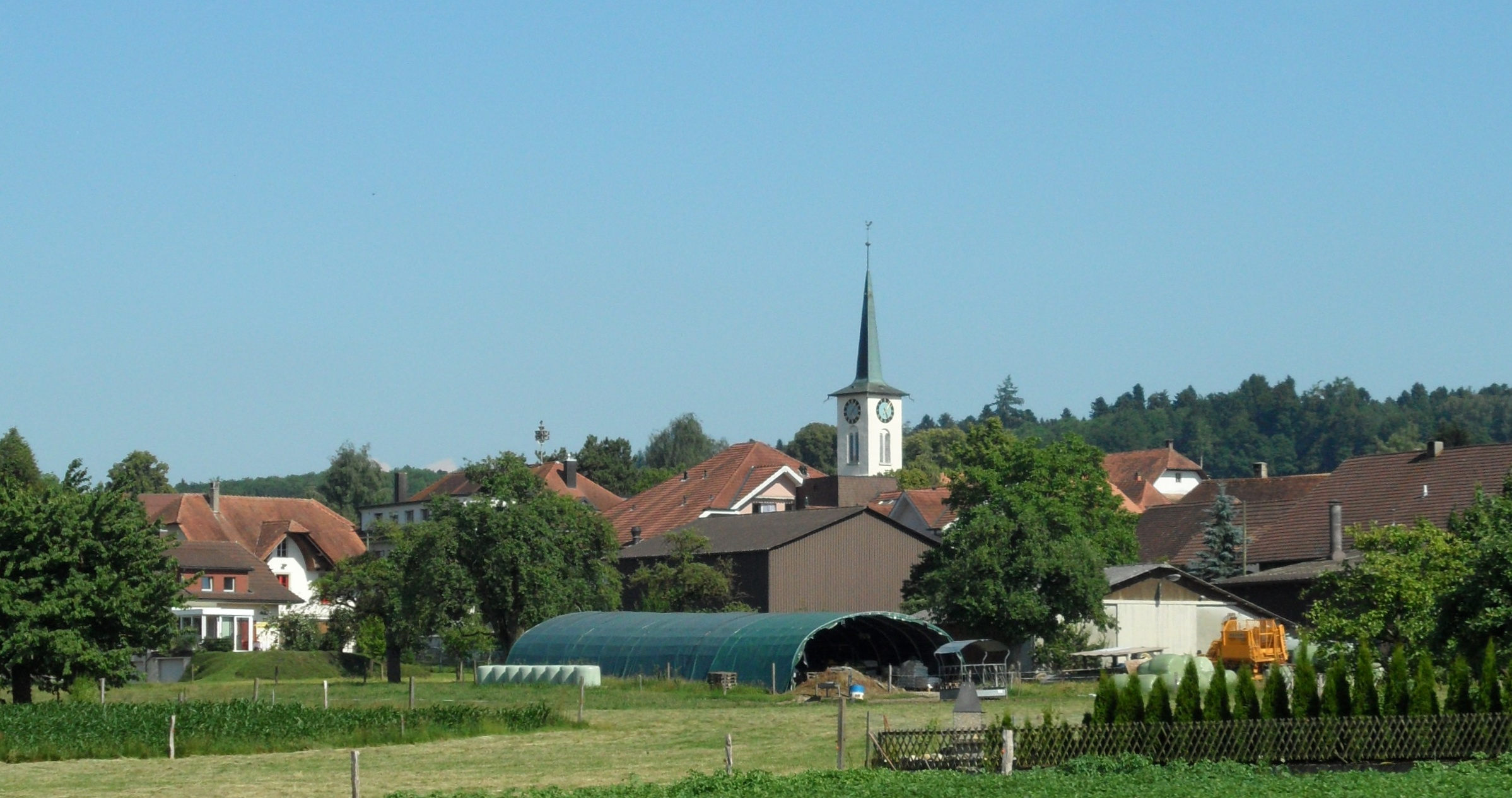
- Diessbach village

- Flag Coat of arms
- Location of Diessbach bei Büren
- Location within Switzerland Location within Canton of Bern
- Coordinates: 47°7′N 7°22′E
- Country: Switzerland
- Canton: Bern
- District: Seeland

Government
  - Mayor: Urs Zurbuchen

Area
  - Total: 6.30 km^{2} (2.43 sq mi)
- Elevation: 464 m (1,522 ft)

Population (December 2020)
  - Total: 991
  - Density: 157/km^{2} (407/sq mi)
- Time zone: UTC+01:00 (CET)
  - Summer (DST): UTC+02:00 (CEST)
- Postal code: 3264
- SFOS number: 385
- ISO 3166 code: CH-BE
- Surrounded by: Schnottwil, Wengi, Grossaffoltern, Lyss, Büetigen, Dotzigen, Büren an der Aare
- Website: www.diessbach.ch

Diessbach bei Büren is a municipality in the Seeland administrative district in the canton of Bern in Switzerland.

Diessbach has a reformed church, and is the center of the parish which includes the municipalities Busswil bei Büren, Büetigen and Dotzigen as well.

== History ==
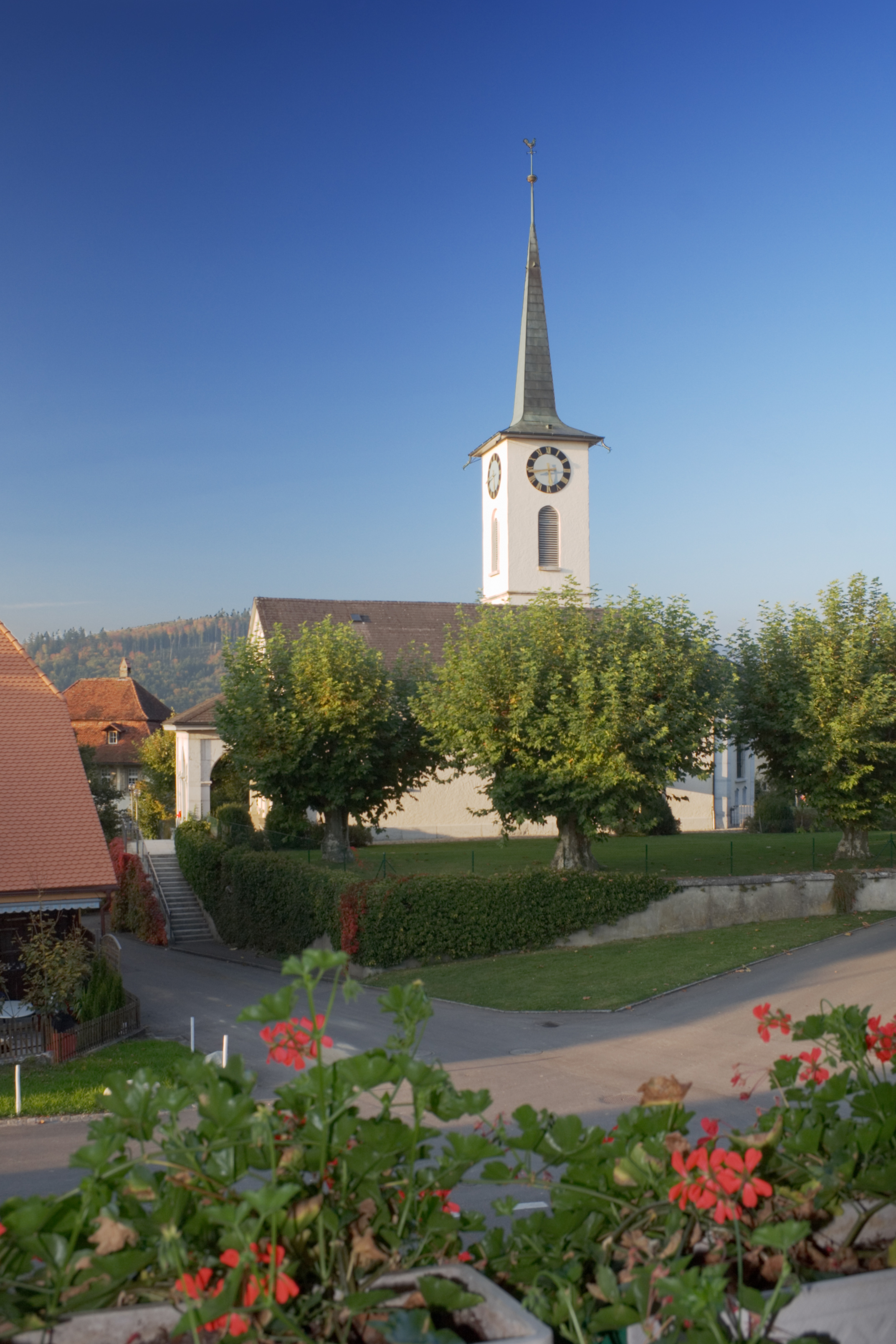
Church in Diessbach

The earliest traces of human settlement come from the Mesolithic and Neolithic eras. Scattered Bronze Age items and a La Tene era grave have also been found. During the Roman era there was an estate at Schwerzi-Maueracker and small settlements at Moosacker and Schaliberg.

The town first appeared in historical sources in 1244, under the name Diespah. At that time, the settlement consisted of a few farms and the church, which can be traced back to the seventh century and was also described in 1244.

As part of the Strassberg holdings, Diessbach became part of Bern in 1393 along with Büren an der Aare, which became the administrative district in 1803.

The current village church was built in 1858-59. However, this building had five predecessor buildings stretching back to the 7th or 8th century. It was first mentioned as St. John's Church in 1244.

Beginning in the early 19th century, the farmers in Diessbach switched to raising dairy cows. By 1830 there were two large dairies in the municipality. There are a few small factories which produce watch parts and wood or metal buildings. Even though there is no rail station in the municipality, many workers commute to Lyss for their jobs. The municipality has its own primary school.

== Geography ==
Diessbach bei Büren has an area of 6.33 km^{2} (2.44 sq mi). Of this area, 3.76 km^{2} (1.45 mi^{2}) or 59.6% is used for agricultural purposes, while 2.03 km^{2} (0.78 mi^{2}) or 32.2% is forested. Of the rest of the land, 0.49 km^{2} (0.19 mi^{2}) or 7.8% is settled (buildings or roads).

Of the built up area, housing and buildings made up 4.0% and transportation infrastructure made up 2.7%. Out of the forested land, all of the forested land area is covered with heavy forests. Of the agricultural land, 51.0% is used for growing crops and 6.0% is pastures, while 2.5% is used for orchards or vine crops.

The municipality is located on the northern edge of the Oberwald forest. It consists of the village of Diessbach bei Büren and the neighborhoods of Angel, Eichi and Hübeli.

On 31 December 2009 Amtsbezirk Büren, the municipality's former district, was dissolved. On the following day, 1 January 2010, it joined the newly created Verwaltungskreis Seeland.

== Coat of arms ==
The blazon of the municipal coat of arms is Gules a Triple Bend wavy fimbriated Sable. The wavy stripes represent a stream (German: bach), making this an example of canting arms.

== Demographics ==
Diessbach bei Büren has a population (as of December 2020) of 991. As of 2010, 6.8% of the population are resident foreign nationals. Over the last 10 years (2000-2010) the population has changed at a rate of 6.2%. Migration accounted for 5.6%, while births and deaths accounted for -0.5%.

Most of the population (as of 2000) speaks German (839 or 97.3%) as their first language, French is the second most common (9 or 1.0%) and Albanian is the third (5 or 0.6%). There are 3 people who speak Italian.

As of 2008, the population was 50.4% male and 49.6% female. The population was made up of 420 Swiss men (47.1% of the population) and 29 (3.3%) non-Swiss men. There were 410 Swiss women (46.0%) and 3 (0.3%) non-Swiss women. Of the population in the municipality, 279 or about 32.4% were born in Diessbach bei Büren and lived there in 2000. There were 370 or 42.9% who were born in the same canton, while 139 or 16.1% were born somewhere else in Switzerland, and 46 or 5.3% were born outside of Switzerland.

As of 2010, children and teenagers (0–19 years old) make up 24.7% of the population, while adults (20–64 years old) make up 59.9% and seniors (over 64 years old) make up 15.4%.

As of 2000, there were 357 people who were single and never married in the municipality. There were 405 married individuals, 63 widows or widowers and 37 individuals who are divorced.

As of 2000, there were 90 households that consist of only one person and 33 households with five or more people. In 2000, a total of 322 apartments (93.9% of the total) were permanently occupied, while 11 apartments (3.2%) were seasonally occupied and 10 apartments (2.9%) were empty. As of 2010, the construction rate of new housing units was 11.2 new units per 1000 residents. The vacancy rate for the municipality, in 2011, was 1.47%.

The historical population is given in the following chart:

== Politics ==
In the 2011 federal election the most popular party was the SVP which received 39.4% of the vote. The next three most popular parties were the BDP Party (19.5%), the SPS (17.9%) and the EVP Party (6.1%). In the federal election, a total of 369 votes were cast, and the voter turnout was 57.2%.

== Economy ==
As of 2011, Diessbach bei Büren had an unemployment rate of 1.07%. As of 2008, there were a total of 250 people employed in the municipality. Of these, there were 87 people employed in the primary economic sector and about 19 businesses involved in this sector. 78 people were employed in the secondary sector and there were 16 businesses in this sector. 85 people were employed in the tertiary sector, with 27 businesses in this sector.

In 2008 there were a total of 191 full-time equivalent jobs. The number of jobs in the primary sector was 64, all of which were in agriculture. The number of jobs in the secondary sector was 72 of which 41 or (56.9%) were in manufacturing and 29 (40.3%) were in construction. The number of jobs in the tertiary sector was 55. In the tertiary sector; 14 or 25.5% were in wholesale or retail sales or the repair of motor vehicles, 3 or 5.5% were in the movement and storage of goods, 8 or 14.5% were in a hotel or restaurant, 3 or 5.5% were technical professionals or scientists, 7 or 12.7% were in education and 10 or 18.2% were in health care.

In 2000, there were 133 workers who commuted into the municipality and 325 workers who commuted away. The municipality is a net exporter of workers, with about 2.4 workers leaving the municipality for every one entering. Of the working population, 6.4% used public transportation to get to work, and 63% used a private car.

== Religion ==
From the 2000 census, 78 or 9.0% were Roman Catholic, while 646 or 74.9% belonged to the Swiss Reformed Church. Of the rest of the population, there were 2 members of an Orthodox church (or about 0.23% of the population), and there were 106 individuals (or about 12.30% of the population) who belonged to another Christian church. There were 5 (or about 0.58% of the population) who were Islamic. 49 (or about 5.68% of the population) belonged to no church, are agnostic or atheist, and 29 individuals (or about 3.36% of the population) did not answer the question.

== Education ==
In Diessbach bei Büren about 366 or (42.5%) of the population have completed non-mandatory upper secondary education, and 86 or (10.0%) have completed additional higher education (either university or a Fachhochschule). Of the 86 who completed tertiary schooling, 77.9% were Swiss men, 20.9% were Swiss women.

The Canton of Bern school system provides one year of non-obligatory Kindergarten, followed by six years of Primary school. This is followed by three years of obligatory lower Secondary school where the students are separated according to ability and aptitude. Following the lower Secondary students may attend additional schooling or they may enter an apprenticeship.

During the 2009-10 school year, there were a total of 107 students attending classes in Diessbach bei Büren. There was one kindergarten class with a total of 19 students in the municipality. Of the kindergarten students, 10.5% were permanent or temporary residents of Switzerland (not citizens) and 5.3% have a different mother language than the classroom language. The municipality had 4 primary classes and 72 students. During the same year, there was one lower secondary class with a total of 16 students.

As of 2000, there were 47 students from Diessbach bei Büren who attended schools outside the municipality.
