= Dotzigen =

- Municipality
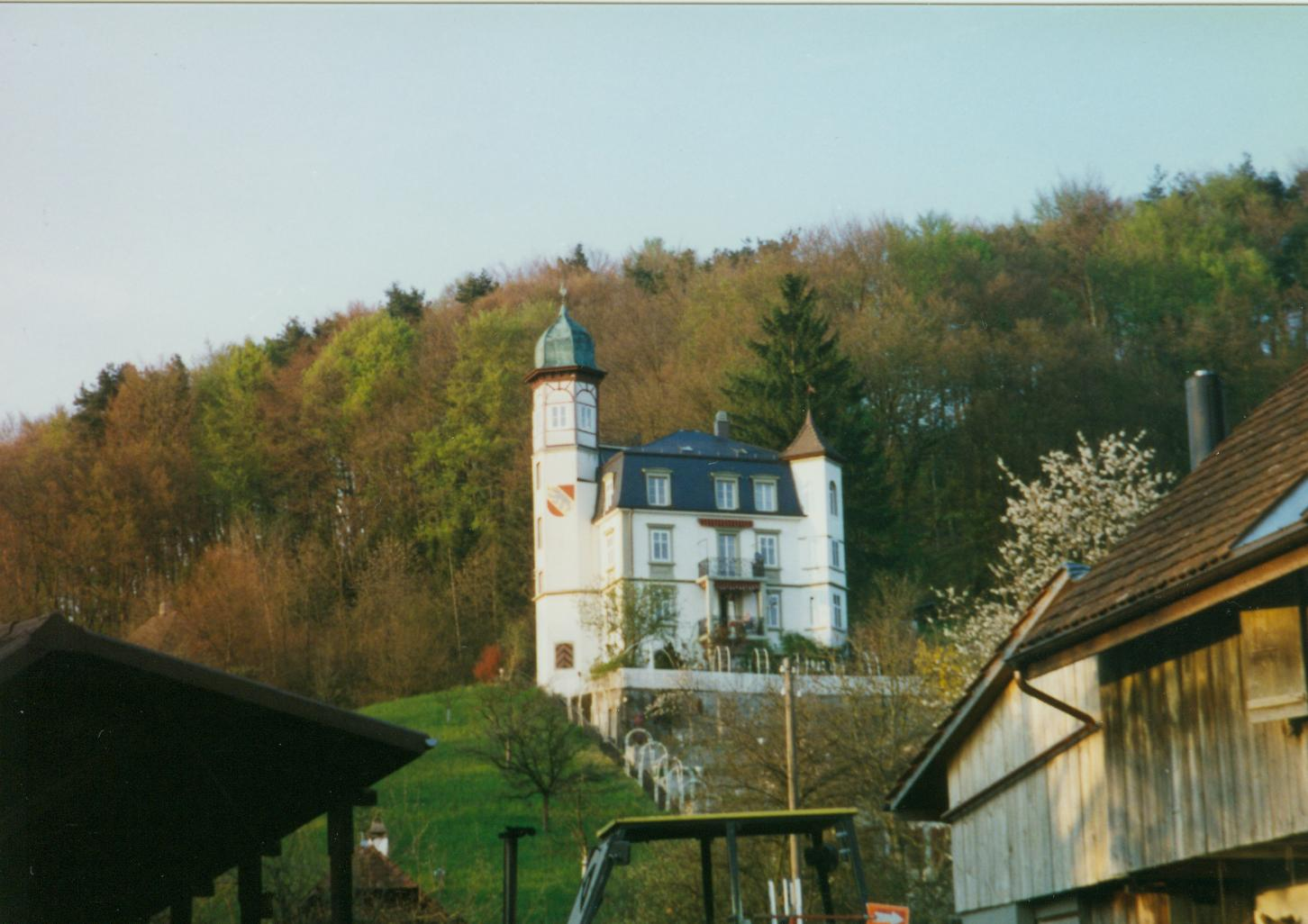
- Dotzigen Castle near the village

- Flag Coat of arms
- Location of Dotzigen
- Location within Switzerland Location within Canton of Bern
- Coordinates: 47°7′N 7°20′E
- Country: Switzerland
- Canton: Bern
- District: Seeland

Government
  - Mayor: Gemeindepräsident; Hansruedi Witkowski (as of 2008)

Area
  - Total: 4.25 km^{2} (1.64 sq mi)
- Elevation: 435 m (1,427 ft)

Population (December 2020)
  - Total: 1,490
  - Density: 351/km^{2} (908/sq mi)
- Time zone: UTC+01:00 (CET)
  - Summer (DST): UTC+02:00 (CEST)
- Postal code: 3293
- SFOS number: 386
- ISO 3166 code: CH-BE
- Surrounded by: Büetigen, Schwadernau, Scheuren, Meienried, Büren an der Aare and Diessbach bei Büren
- Website: www.dotzigen.ch

Dotzigen is a municipality in the Seeland administrative district in the canton of Bern in Switzerland.

== History ==
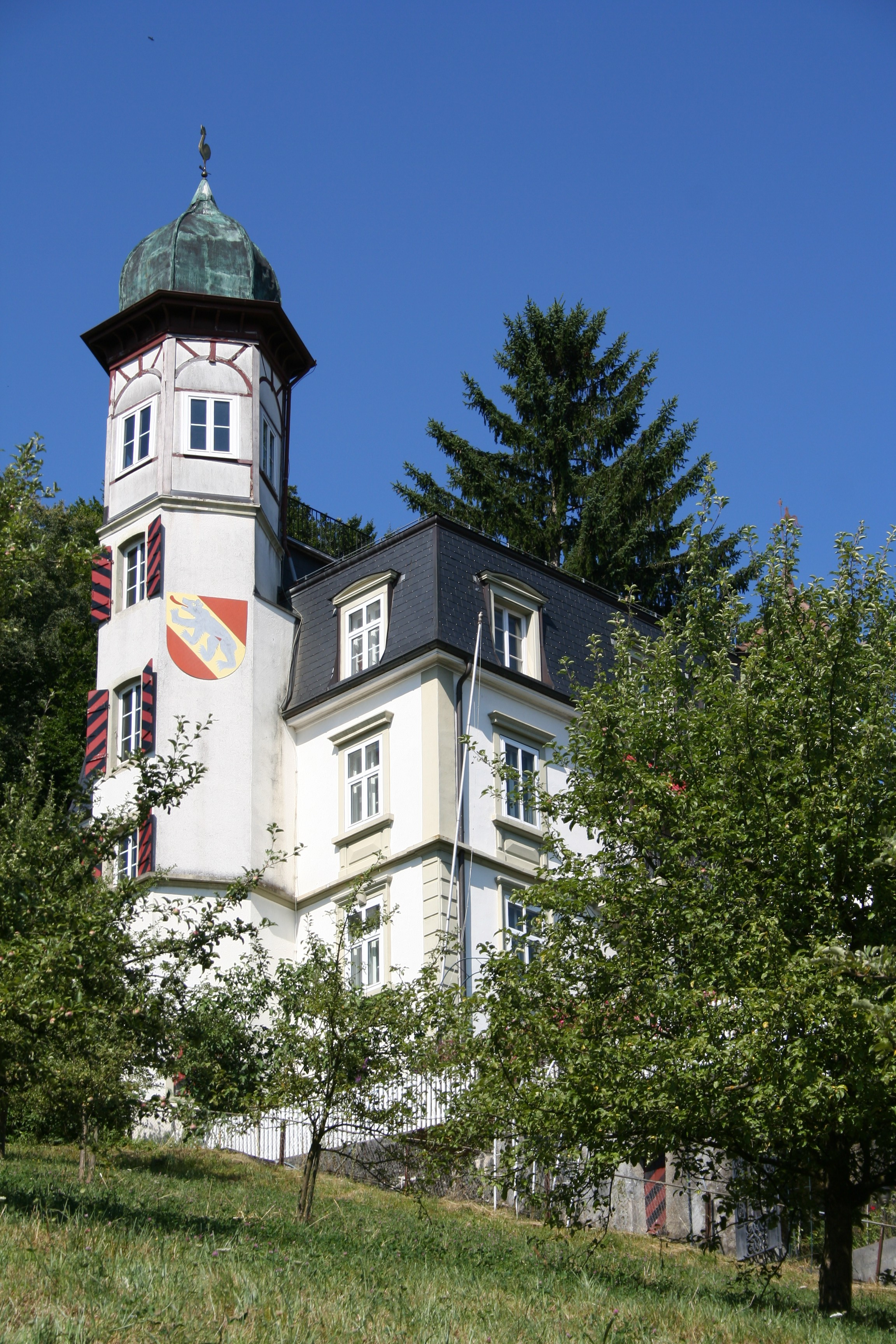
Dotzigen's Schlossli

Dotzigen is first mentioned in 1182 as Tocingen.

The earliest trace of settlements in Dotzigen are six Hallstatt grave mounds on the Dotzigenberg. This was followed by a Roman era settlement near the current village center. During the Middle Ages it was part of the Herrschaft of Strassberg, which was acquired in 1393 by Bern. It was part of the low court of Diesbach in the bailiwick of Büren.

The village church of St. Mauritius was first mentioned in 1242. After the Protestant Reformation, in 1531, it came under Bernese control and the parish was immediately dissolved. At first the village was part of the parish of Büren and then later of Diessbach.

The village was along the Büren-Aarberg road and the inhabitants traded produce to those towns and operated a rest station. The Jura water correction projects of the 19th century helped prevent flooding and destruction in the village. In 1876 the Solothurn-Lyss railroad connected the village to those larger cities. Easy transportation links allowed commercial and industrial developments in Dotzigen. A distillery opened in 1888, followed by a brick factory in 1891 and a Parketterie furniture factory in 1898. Despite the presence of an agricultural cooperative and a metal foundry, in 2000 over two-thirds of the labor force commuted to towns such as Biel, Lyss and Grenchen. The historic Schlössli outside the village was built in 1898 by the brick manufacturer Johann Schaller.

== Geography ==
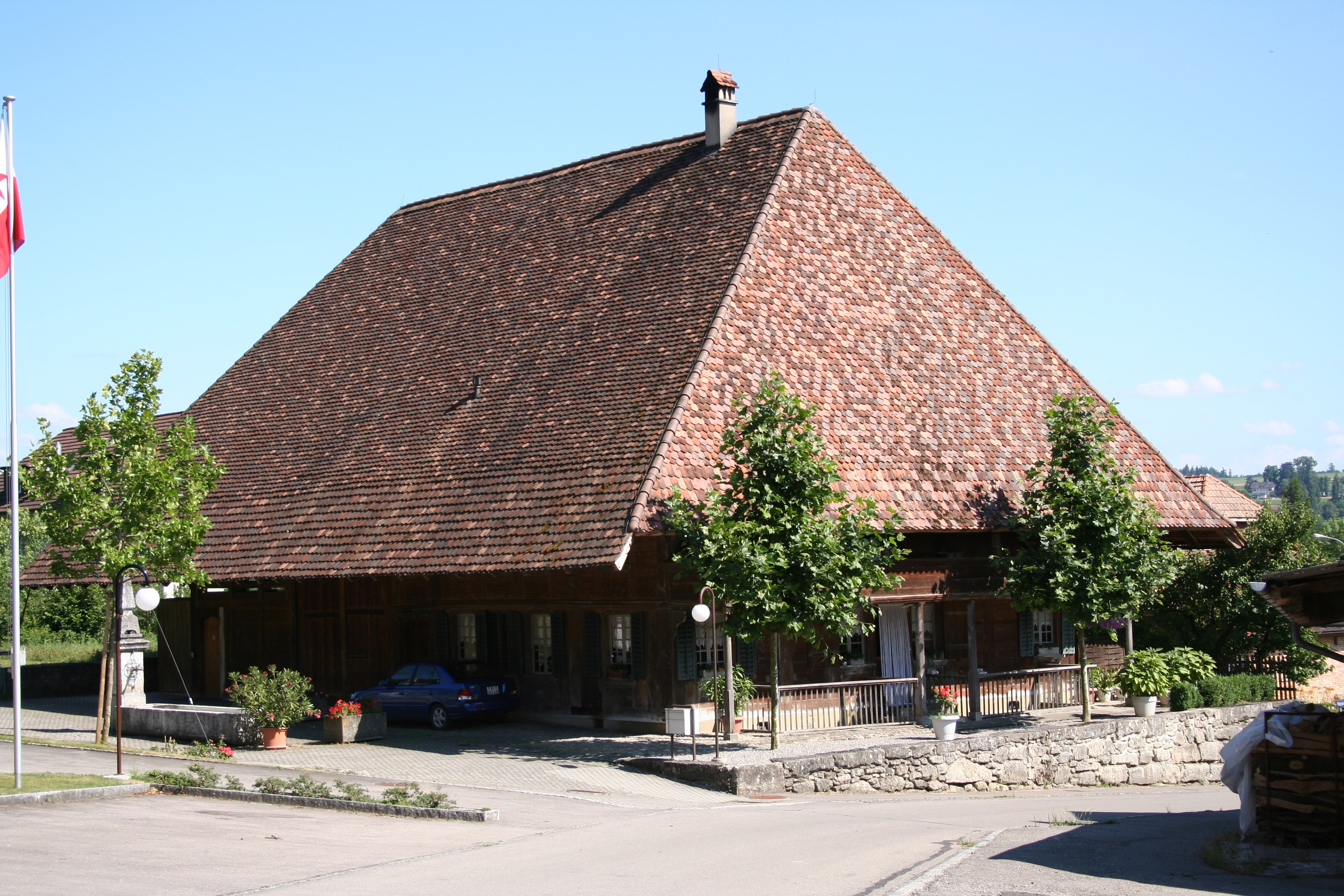
A farmhouse in Dotzigen

Aerial view by Walter Mittelholzer (1932)

Dotzigen has an area of 4.23 km^{2} (1.63 sq mi). Of this area, 2.35 km^{2} (0.91 mi^{2}) or 55.7% is used for agricultural purposes, while 1.1 km^{2} (0.42 mi^{2}) or 26.1% is forested. Of the rest of the land, 0.63 km^{2} (0.24 mi^{2}) or 14.9% is settled (buildings or roads), 0.09 km^{2} (22 acres) or 2.1% is either rivers or lakes and 0.05 km^{2} (12 acres) or 1.2% is unproductive land.

Of the built up area, industrial buildings made up 1.7% of the total area while housing and buildings made up 7.8% and transportation infrastructure made up 3.8%. while parks, green belts and sports fields made up 1.4%. Out of the forested land, all of the forested land area is covered with heavy forests. Of the agricultural land, 46.2% is used for growing crops and 7.3% is pastures, while 2.1% is used for orchards or vine crops. All the water in the municipality is flowing water.

Dotzigen lies in Seeland at the western edge of the Dotzigen/Stedtli Mountains. In the west the Old Aare flows (the part of the Aare River that flows after the Jura water correction); it is now a protected floodplain. The Jura water correction made possible the expansion of the town in the flat area of the municipality.

On 31 December 2009 Amtsbezirk Büren, the municipality's former district, was dissolved. On the following day, 1 January 2010, it joined the newly created Verwaltungskreis Seeland.

== Coat of arms ==
The blazon of the municipal coat of arms is Gules in a Chief Argent a Mullet of the first.

== Demographics ==
Dotzigen has a population (as of December 2020) of 1,490. As of 2010, 6.2% of the population are resident foreign nationals. Over the last 10 years (2000-2010) the population has changed at a rate of -2.1%. Migration accounted for -1.3%, while births and deaths accounted for -0.2%.

Most of the population (as of 2000) speaks German (1,304 or 93.7%) as their first language, French is the second most common (21 or 1.5%) and Italian is the third (13 or 0.9%). There are 3 people who speak Romansh.

As of 2008, the population was 49.9% male and 50.1% female. The population was made up of 619 Swiss men (46.5% of the population) and 46 (3.5%) non-Swiss men. There were 630 Swiss women (47.3%) and 3 (0.2%) non-Swiss women. Of the population in the municipality, 401 or about 28.8% were born in Dotzigen and lived there in 2000. There were 595 or 42.8% who were born in the same canton, while 203 or 14.6% were born somewhere else in Switzerland, and 125 or 9.0% were born outside of Switzerland.

As of 2010, children and teenagers (0–19 years old) make up 21.2% of the population, while adults (20–64 years old) make up 65% and seniors (over 64 years old) make up 13.8%.

As of 2000, there were 562 people who were single and never married in the municipality. There were 682 married individuals, 80 widows or widowers and 67 individuals who are divorced.

As of 2000, there were 118 households that consist of only one person and 36 households with five or more people. In 2000, a total of 491 apartments (92.1% of the total) were permanently occupied, while 18 apartments (3.4%) were seasonally occupied and 24 apartments (4.5%) were empty. As of 2010, the construction rate of new housing units was 0.8 new units per 1000 residents. The vacancy rate for the municipality, in 2011, was 2.56%.

The historical population is given in the following chart:

== Sights ==
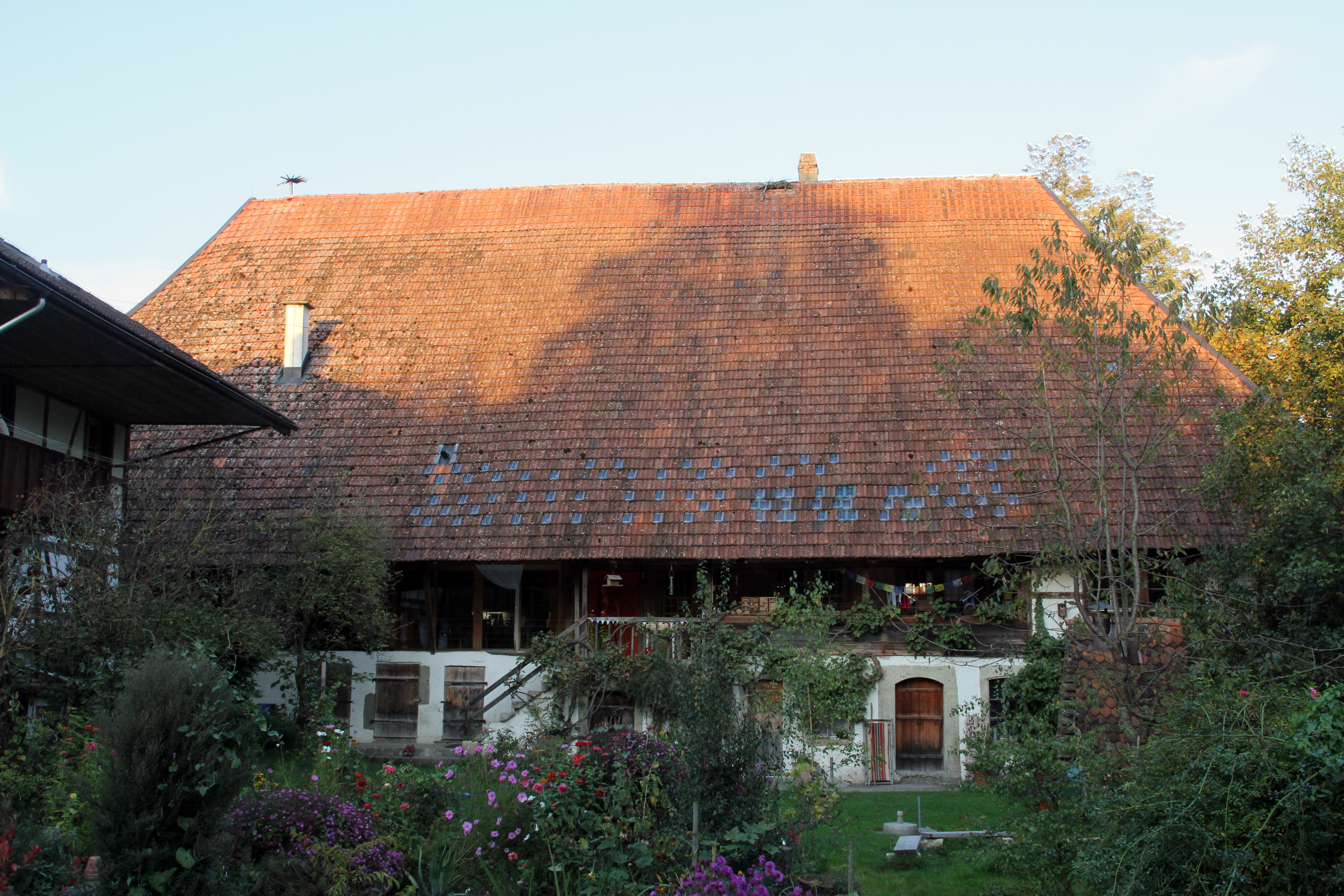
The mill in Dotzigen

Jeremias Gotthelf mentioned the sour Dotziger wine in one of his books, which grew and continues to grow at the foot of the mountains.

At the foot of the Dotzigen Mountains is a small castle, known for its gilded copper roof. At the exit of the town in the direction of Diessbach is an old flour mill powered by a water wheel. This has been restored and is available to visitors by reservation. The old mill is listed as a Swiss heritage site of national significance.

== Politics ==
In the 2011 federal election the most popular party was the SVP which received 31.7% of the vote. The next three most popular parties were the BDP Party (21.1%), the SPS (19.6%) and the Green Party (6.8%). In the federal election, a total of 507 votes were cast, and the voter turnout was 49.1%.

== Economy ==
As of 2011, Dotzigen had an unemployment rate of 1.87%. As of 2008, there were a total of 525 people employed in the municipality. Of these, there were 28 people employed in the primary economic sector and about 11 businesses involved in this sector. 48 people were employed in the secondary sector and there were 10 businesses in this sector. 449 people were employed in the tertiary sector, with 36 businesses in this sector.

In 2008 there were a total of 429 full-time equivalent jobs. The number of jobs in the primary sector was 23, all of which were in agriculture. The number of jobs in the secondary sector was 39 of which 22 or (56.4%) were in manufacturing and 17 (43.6%) were in construction. The number of jobs in the tertiary sector was 367. In the tertiary sector; 259 or 70.6% were in wholesale or retail sales or the repair of motor vehicles, 17 or 4.6% were in education and 76 or 20.7% were in health care.

In 2000, there were 295 workers who commuted into the municipality and 572 workers who commuted away. The municipality is a net exporter of workers, with about 1.9 workers leaving the municipality for every one entering. Of the working population, 13.4% used public transportation to get to work, and 59.9% used a private car.

== Religion ==
From the 2000 census, 165 or 11.9% were Roman Catholic, while 1,032 or 74.2% belonged to the Swiss Reformed Church. Of the rest of the population, there were 5 members of an Orthodox church (or about 0.36% of the population), there was 1 individual who belongs to the Christian Catholic Church, and there were 57 individuals (or about 4.10% of the population) who belonged to another Christian church. There were 31 (or about 2.23% of the population) who were Islamic. There were 6 individuals who were Buddhist and 2 individuals who belonged to another church. 82 (or about 5.90% of the population) belonged to no church, are agnostic or atheist, and 38 individuals (or about 2.73% of the population) did not answer the question.

== Education ==
In Dotzigen about 572 or (41.1%) of the population have completed non-mandatory upper secondary education, and 126 or (9.1%) have completed additional higher education (either university or a Fachhochschule). Of the 126 who completed tertiary schooling, 77.8% were Swiss men, 16.7% were Swiss women, 4.8% were non-Swiss men.

The Canton of Bern school system provides one year of non-obligatory Kindergarten, followed by six years of Primary school. This is followed by three years of obligatory lower Secondary school where the students are separated according to ability and aptitude. Following the lower Secondary students may attend additional schooling or they may enter an apprenticeship.

During the 2009-10 school year, there were a total of 222 students attending classes in Dotzigen. There was one kindergarten class with a total of 24 students in the municipality. Of the kindergarten students, 16.7% were permanent or temporary residents of Switzerland (not citizens) and 12.5% have a different mother language than the classroom language. The municipality had 4 primary classes and 65 students. Of the primary students, 3.1% were permanent or temporary residents of Switzerland (not citizens) and 3.1% have a different mother language than the classroom language. During the same year, there were 7 lower secondary classes with a total of 133 students. There were 2.3% who were permanent or temporary residents of Switzerland (not citizens) and 4.5% have a different mother language than the classroom language.

As of 2000, there were 84 students in Dotzigen who came from another municipality, while 52 residents attended schools outside the municipality.

== Transportation ==
Dotzigen was connected to the Swiss railway network by the construction of the Solothurn-Lyss-Bahn in 1876. Today the trains run only to Büren an der Aare, or Kerzers on the other side. Dotzigen can be reached in a car via A5 (Solothurn-Biel).
