= Büetigen =

- Municipality
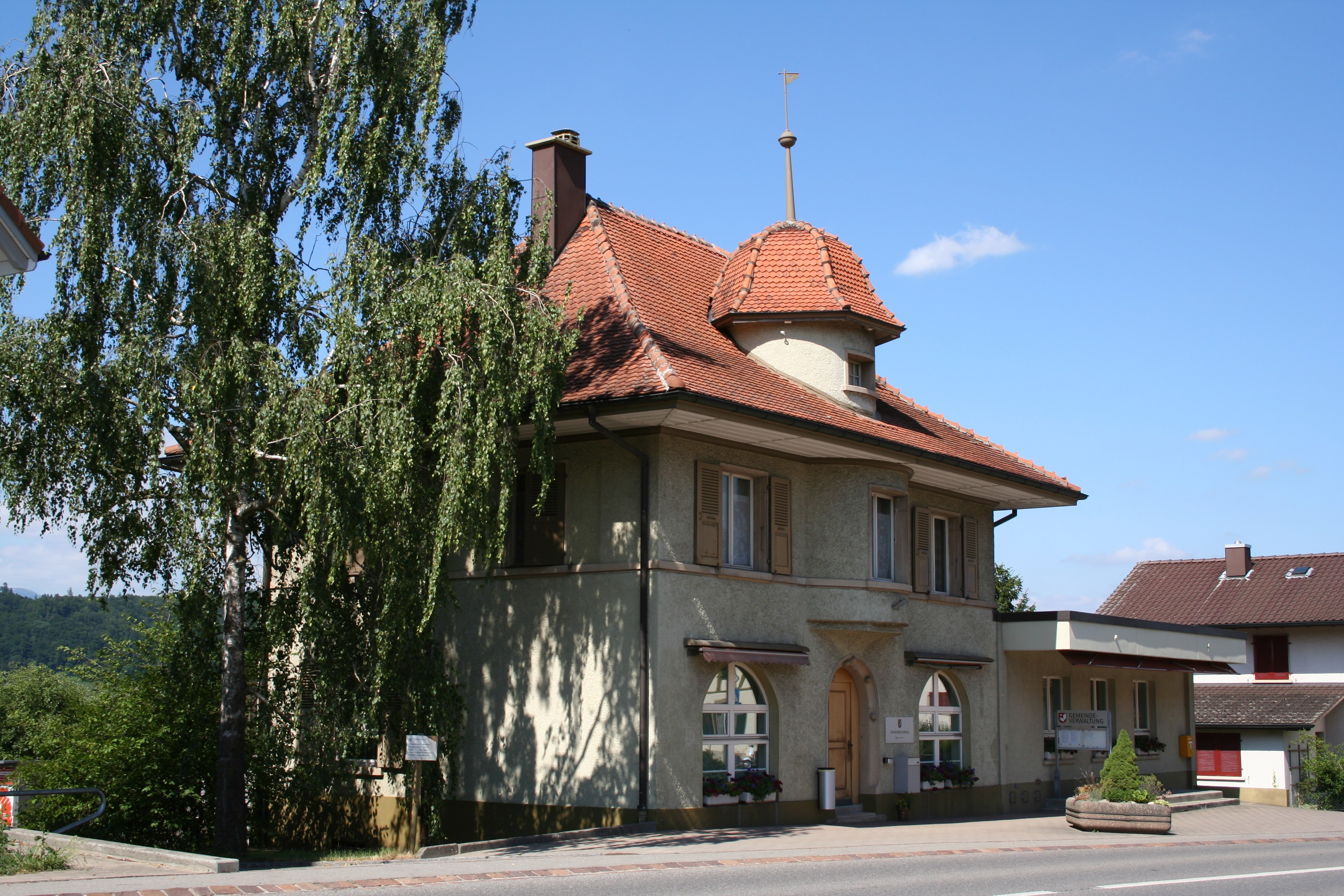
- Büetigen town hall (Gemeindehaus)

- Flag Coat of arms
- Location of Büetigen
- Location within Switzerland Location within Canton of Bern
- Coordinates: 47°6′N 7°21′E
- Country: Switzerland
- Canton: Bern
- District: Seeland

Government
  - Mayor: Gemeindepräsident; Fritz Linder SVP/UDC (as of 2008)

Area
  - Total: 3.60 km^{2} (1.39 sq mi)
- Elevation: 448 m (1,470 ft)

Population (December 2020)
  - Total: 894
  - Density: 248/km^{2} (643/sq mi)
- Time zone: UTC+01:00 (CET)
  - Summer (DST): UTC+02:00 (CEST)
- Postal code: 3263
- SFOS number: 382
- ISO 3166 code: CH-BE
- Surrounded by: Busswil bei Büren, Diessbach bei Büren, Dotzigen, Schwadernau, Studen, and Lyss
- Website: www.bueetigen.ch

Büetigen is a municipality in the Seeland administrative district in the canton of Bern in Switzerland.

== History ==
Büetigen is first mentioned in 1261 as Buetingen.

The earliest trace of humans in Büetigen are scattered mesolithic and neolithic tools and items. La Tene era graves and an early medieval cemetery have also been found. The Burghubel hill was probably the family seat of the Ministerialis (unfree knights in the service of a feudal overlord) family of Büetigen. The family was first mentioned in the 13th century, but no trace of their castle has been discovered. Eventually the village passed from the Büetigen family to St. Urban's Abbey and Frienisberg Abbey. Frienisberg Abbey gradually replaced all the other landholders in the village to become the sole landlord. However, in 1365 the Büetigen jurisdiction transferred to the Bernese Vogt in Aarberg. Fifteen years later, in 1380, the court and jurisdiction were sold directly to Bern. After the secularization of the Abbey, in 1528 during the Protestant Reformation, Bern acquired all the Abbey's lands. Büetigen became part of the new bailiwick of Frienisberg while the military administration and the high court was in Büren. After the 1798 French invasion, the village of Büetigen, without the surrounding farms, became part of the Helvetic Republic's Büren district.

Located in a flood plain around the Aare river, the village was responsible for maintaining the levees around the river. The Hagneck canal (built 1868-78) helped to prevent flooding. A project to drain marshes and control the river in 1943-52 drastically changed the appearance of the valley floor. Büetigen is located on the old Solothurn to Murten road, but is not on any train lines. While farming and raising livestock is still important, about 70% of the working population commutes to Lyss, Bern and Biel/Bienne. It shares a vital records office and doctor with Diessbach bei Büren and the secondary school with Dotzigen.

== Geography ==
Büetigen has an area of 3.61 km^{2} (1.39 sq mi). Of this area, 2.27 km^{2} (0.88 mi^{2}) or 62.9% is used for agricultural purposes, while 0.96 km^{2} (0.37 mi^{2}) or 26.6% is forested. Of the rest of the land, 0.36 km^{2} (0.14 mi^{2}) or 10.0% is settled (buildings or roads), 0.03 km^{2} (7.4 acres) or 0.8% is either rivers or lakes.

Of the built up area, housing and buildings made up 4.4% and transportation infrastructure made up 4.2%. Out of the forested land, 25.5% of the total land area is heavily forested and 1.1% is covered with orchards or small clusters of trees. Of the agricultural land, 51.2% is used for growing crops and 10.8% is pastures. Of the water in the municipality, 0.6% is in lakes and 0.3% is in rivers and streams.

The municipality is located in a flood plain on the Aare river. It consists of the village of Büetigen, the cluster of farm houses at Im Tal and the new developments at Buchenweg and Birkenweg.

On 31 December 2009 Amtsbezirk Büren, the municipality's former district, was dissolved. On the following day, 1 January 2010, it joined the newly created Verwaltungskreis Seeland.

== Coat of arms ==
The blazon of the municipal coat of arms is Gules a Bear paw Argent issuant from chief sinister and a Mullet of the same.

== Demographics ==
Büetigen has a population (as of December 2020) of 894. As of 2010, 4.7% of the population are resident foreign nationals. Over the last 10 years (2000-2010) the population has changed at a rate of 14.3%. Migration accounted for 10.3%, while births and deaths accounted for -0.4%.

Most of the population (as of 2000) speaks German (673 or 95.2%) as their first language, French is the second most common (19 or 2.7%) and Italian is the third (5 or 0.7%).

As of 2008, the population was 51.4% male and 48.6% female. The population was made up of 388 Swiss men (49.2% of the population) and 17 (2.2%) non-Swiss men. There were 363 Swiss women (46.1%) and 2 (0.3%) non-Swiss women. Of the population in the municipality, 205 or about 29.0% were born in Büetigen and lived there in 2000. There were 351 or 49.6% who were born in the same canton, while 84 or 11.9% were born somewhere else in Switzerland, and 46 or 6.5% were born outside of Switzerland.

As of 2010, children and teenagers (0–19 years old) make up 23.2% of the population, while adults (20–64 years old) make up 60.7% and seniors (over 64 years old) make up 16.1%.

As of 2000, there were 288 people who were single and never married in the municipality. There were 363 married individuals, 29 widows or widowers and 27 individuals who are divorced.

As of 2000, there were 66 households that consist of only one person and 19 households with five or more people. In 2000, a total of 266 apartments (91.4% of the total) were permanently occupied, while 15 apartments (5.2%) were seasonally occupied and 10 apartments (3.4%) were empty. As of 2010, the construction rate of new housing units was 1.3 new units per 1000 residents.

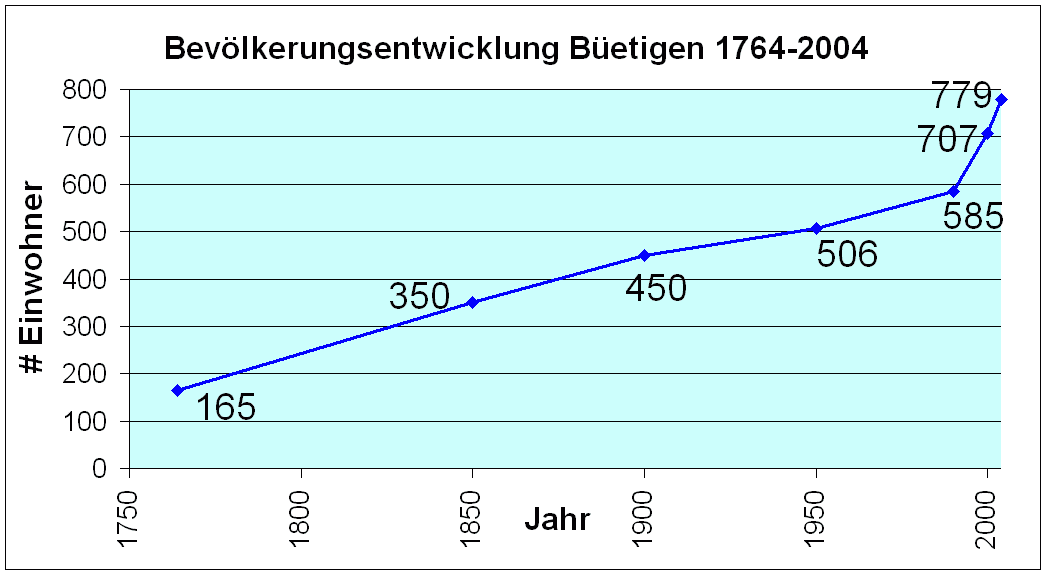
Historical population of Büetigen, 1750-2000

The historical population is given in the following chart:

== Government ==
The legislative body of the municipality is a municipal assembly. The municipal council has five members.

In the 2011 federal election the most popular party was the SVP which received 39.9% of the vote. The next three most popular parties were the BDP Party (18.9%), the SPS (14.8%) and the FDP (6.7%). In the federal election, a total of 337 votes were cast, and the voter turnout was 54.5%.

== Economy ==
As of 2011, Büetigen had an unemployment rate of 1.9%. As of 2008, there were a total of 102 people employed in the municipality. Of these, there were 27 people employed in the primary economic sector and about 9 businesses involved in this sector. 33 people were employed in the secondary sector and there were 7 businesses in this sector. 42 people were employed in the tertiary sector, with 13 businesses in this sector.

In 2008 there were a total of 80 full-time equivalent jobs. The number of jobs in the primary sector was 20, all in agriculture. The number of jobs in the secondary sector was 29 of which 12 or (41.4%) were in manufacturing and 16 (55.2%) were in construction. The number of jobs in the tertiary sector was 31. In the tertiary sector; 2 or 6.5% were in wholesale or retail sales or the repair of motor vehicles, 3 or 9.7% were in a hotel or restaurant, 5 or 16.1% were technical professionals or scientists, 8 or 25.8% were in education and 5 or 16.1% were in health care.

In 2000, there were 49 workers who commuted into the municipality and 293 workers who commuted away. The municipality is a net exporter of workers, with about 6.0 workers leaving the municipality for every one entering. Of the working population, 10.4% used public transportation to get to work, and 65.7% used a private car.

== Religion ==
From the 2000 census, 66 or 9.3% were Roman Catholic, while 540 or 76.4% belonged to the Swiss Reformed Church. Of the rest of the population, there were 2 members of an Orthodox church (or about 0.28% of the population), and there were 41 individuals (or about 5.80% of the population) who belonged to another Christian church. There were 7 individuals (or about 0.99% of the population) who were Jewish, and there was 1 individual who was Islamic. There were 4 individuals who were Buddhist. 38 (or about 5.37% of the population) belonged to no church, are agnostic or atheist, and 28 individuals (or about 3.96% of the population) did not answer the question.

== Education ==
In Büetigen about 318 or (45.0%) of the population have completed non-mandatory upper secondary education, and 77 or (10.9%) have completed additional higher education (either university or a Fachhochschule). Of the 77 who completed tertiary schooling, 75.3% were Swiss men, 16.9% were Swiss women, 7.8% were non-Swiss men.

The Canton of Bern school system provides one year of non-obligatory Kindergarten, followed by six years of Primary school. This is followed by three years of obligatory lower Secondary school where the students are separated according to ability and aptitude. Following the lower Secondary students may attend additional schooling or they may enter an apprenticeship.

During the 2009-10 school year, there were a total of 67 students attending classes in Büetigen. There was one kindergarten class with a total of 12 students in the municipality. Of the kindergarten students, 8.3% were permanent or temporary residents of Switzerland (not citizens) and 16.7% have a different mother language than the classroom language. The municipality had 3 primary classes and 55 students. Of the primary students, 5.5% were permanent or temporary residents of Switzerland (not citizens) and 3.6% have a different mother language than the classroom language.

As of 2000, there were 40 students from Büetigen who attended schools outside the municipality.
