= 2013–14 CERH European League =

Tournament details
- Dates: 9 November 2013 – 4 May 2014
- Teams: 16 (from 6 associations)

Final positions
- Champions: (Spain) Barcelona (20th title)
- Runners-up: (Portugal) Porto

Tournament statistics
- Matches played: 59
- Goals scored: 535 (9.07 per match)

The 2013–14 CERH European League was the 49th season of Europe's premier club roller hockey competition organised by CERH, and the 17th season since it was renamed from Champions League to European League. Sixteen teams from six national associations qualified for the competition as a result of their domestic league placing in the previous season. Following a group stage and a knockout round, the four best teams contested a final four tournament, which took place at the Palau Blaugrana in Barcelona, on 3 and 4 May 2014.

The final match was played between Barcelona and Porto, for the sixth time in the competition's history, after they defeated the defending champions Benfica and the 2012–13 CERS Cup winners Vendrell in the semi-finals, respectively. Barcelona beat Porto 3–1 and won their twentieth title, establishing a new record. The Portuguese team lost their second consecutive final and finished the competition as runners-up for a record tenth time.

Barcelona will play against Noia, the winners of the 2013–14 CERS Cup, for the 2014 CERH Continental Cup, and against the winners of the 2014 South American Club Championship for the 2014 FIRS Intercontinental Cup.

== Teams ==
Sixteen teams from six national associations qualified for the 2013–14 CERH European League as a result of their placing in their respective national leagues. The number of berths allocated to each national association was dependent on the association's ranking coefficient.

Country	Team	Qualified as
Spain	Liceo	1st in 2012–13 OK Liga
Spain	Barcelona	2nd in 2012–13 OK Liga
Spain	Vendrell	3rd in 2012–13 OK Liga
Spain	Reus Deportiu	4th in 2012–13 OK Liga
Portugal	Benfica	Winner of 2012–13 CERH European League
Portugal	Porto	1st in 2012–13 1ª Divisão
Portugal	Oliveirense	3rd in 2012–13 1ª Divisão
Portugal	Valongo	4th in 2012–13 1ª Divisão
Italy	Valdagno	1st in 2012–13 Serie A1
Italy	Viareggio	2nd in 2012–13 Serie A1
Italy	Amatori Lodi	3rd in 2012–13 Serie A1
France	Saint Omer	1st in 2012–13 Nationale 1
France	Dinan Quévert	2nd in 2012–13 Nationale 1
Germany	Herringen	1st in 2012–13 Bundesliga
Germany	Iserlohn	2nd in 2012–13 Bundesliga
Switzerland	Diessbach	1st in 2012–13 LNA

== Group stage ==
Key to colours in group tables
Group winners and runners-up advanced to the quarter-finals.

=== Group A ===
Team	Pts	Pld	W	D	L	GF	GA	Diff
(Spain) Liceo	14	6	4	2	0	39	18	+21
(Portugal) Valongo	13	6	4	1	1	28	17	+11
(France) Saint Omer	5	6	1	2	3	21	36	−15
(Italy) Amatori Lodi	1	6	0	1	5	18	35	−17

	LIC	LOD	VAL	STO
Liceo		6–2	8–3	13–7
Amatori Lodi	2–8		1–4	5–5
Valongo	2–2	7–4		8–0
Saint Omer	2–2	5–4	2–4	

9 November 2013	Valongo (Portugal)	8–0	(France) Saint Omer	Pavilhão Municipal de Valongo, Valongo
18:30 WET	1-0 Hugo Azevedo 5' 1st Hf; 2-0 J Souto 13' 1st Hf; 3-0 Rafa 21' 1st Hf; 4-0 Henrique Magalhaes 2' 2nd Hf; 5-0 Joao Souto 15' 2nd Hf; 6-0 Nuno Rodrigues 18' 2nd Hf; 7-0 João Souto 19' 2nd Hf; 8-0 Nuno Rodrigues 21' 2nd Hf			Referee: Issac Sanz, Sergi Mayor (Spain)

9 November 2013	Liceo (Spain)	6–2	(Italy) Amatori Lodi	Pazo dos Deportes de Riazor, A Coruña
19:00 CET				Referee: José Pinto, Paulo Santos (Portugal)

23 November 2013	Amatori Lodi (Italy)	1–4	(Portugal) Valongo	PalaCastellotti, Lodi
21:00 CET				Referee: Luís Delfa, Juan Molina (Spain)

23 November 2013	Saint Omer (France)	2–2	(Spain) Liceo	Salle des Sports du Brockus, Saint-Omer
20:30 CET	1-0 Florent David 17' 1st Hf; 2-2 Cirilo Garcia 13' 2nd Hf		1-1 Toni Perez 2' 2nd Hf; 1-2 ?????? 5' 2nd Hf	Referee: Rui Torres, Joaquim Pinto (Portugal)

14 December 2013	Saint Omer (France)	5–4	(Italy) Amatori Lodi	Salle des Sports du Brockus, Saint-Omer
18.30 CET				Referee: Óscar Valverde, Francisco Garcia (Spain)

14 December 2013	Valongo (Portugal)	2–2	(Spain) Liceo	Pavilhão Municipal de Valongo, Valongo
18:30 WET	1-1 Henrique Magalhães 24´1st Hf; 2-2 Hugo Azevedo 8´2nd Hf		0-1 Toni Perez 15´1st Hf; 1-2 Toni Perez GP 5´2nd Hf	Referee: Mateo Galoppi, Franco Ferrari (Italy)

18 January 2014	Amatori Lodi (Italy)	5–5	(France) Saint Omer	PalaCastellotti, Lodi
21:00 CET				Referee: Josep Ribo, Alberto Lopez (Spain)

18 January 2014	Liceo (Spain)	8–3	(Portugal) Valongo	Pazo dos Deportes de Lide, Santiago de Compostela
19:00 CET	1-1 Lucas Ordoñez 9´1st Hf; 2-1 Jordi bargallo 19´1st Hf; 3-1 Lucas Ordoñez LD 22´1st Hf; 4-1 Lucas Ordoñez LD 23´1st Hf; 5-3 Josep Lampas LD 11´2nd Hf; 6-3 Juan Lopez Garcia 18´2nd Hf; 7-3 Lucas Ordoñez Rearga LD 2nd Hf; 8-3 Cesar Dominguez 2nd Hf		0-1 Miguel Viterbo 4´GP 1st Hf; 4-2 Hugo Azevedo 6´2nd Hf; 4-3 Nuno Araujo LD 11´2nd Hf	Referee: Alessandro Eccelsi, Alessandro da Prato (Italy)

8 February 2014	Saint Omer (France)	2–4	(Portugal) Valongo	Salle des Sports du Brockus, Saint-Omer
20:30 CET			João Souto (1); Nuno Araújo (1); Hugo Azevedo (1); Telmo Pinto (1)	Referee: António Gomez, José Gomez (Spain)

8 February 2014	Amatori Lodi (Italy)	2–8	(Spain) Liceo	PalaCastellotti, Lodi
21:00 CET			0-1 Jordi Bargalló; 0-2 Toni Pérez; 0-3 Lucas Ordoñez; 0-4 Josep Lamas; 0-5 Lucas Ordoñez; 0-6 Eduard Lamas; 1-7 Jordi Bargalló; 1-8 Cesar Carballeira	Referee: Luís Peixoto, Miguel Guilherme (Portugal)

22 February 2014	Valongo (Portugal)	7–4	(Italy) Amatori Lodi	Pavilhão Municipal de Valongo, Valongo
20:00 WET	1-0 Nuno Rodrigues "Peixe" 3' 1st Hf; 2-1 Nuno Rodrigues "Peixe" 13' 1st Hf; 3-1 Miguel Viterbo 13' 1st Hf; 4-2 João Souto 21' 1st Hf; 5-3 Miguel Viterbo 12' 2nd Hf; 6-3 "Xavi" Cardoso 16' 2nd Hf; 7-4 José "Rafa" Costa 24' 2nd Hf		1-1 Stefano Curti 12' 1st Hf; 3-2 Franco Platero 15' 1st Hf; 4-3 Domenico Illuzi LD 10ªF 7' 2nd Hf; 6-3 Domenico Illuzi 23' 2nd Hf; 6-4 Domenico Illuzi 24´2nd Hf	Referee: Javier Galan, Juan Melero (Spain)

22 February 2014	Liceo (Spain)	13–7	(France) Saint Omer	Pazo dos Deportes de Riazor, A Coruña
21:00 CET	Lucas Ordoñez (6); Jordi Bargallo (1); Josep Lamas (4); Eduard Lamas (2)			Referee: Paulo Almeida, Paulo Rainha (Portugal)

=== Group B ===
Team	Pts	Pld	W	D	L	GF	GA	Diff
(Portugal) Benfica	15	6	5	0	1	43	20	+23
(Spain) Vendrell	12	6	4	0	2	27	20	+7
(France) Quévert	7	6	2	1	3	26	24	+2
(Switzerland) Diessbach	1	6	0	1	5	18	50	−32

	BEN	VEN	QUE	DIE
Benfica		1–3	7–5	13–3
Vendrell	3–6		4–1	9–6
Quévert	4–5	4-3		9–2
Diessbach	2–11	2–5	3–3	

9 November 2013	Vendrell (Spain)	4–1	(France) Quévert	Pav. CE Vendrell, Vendrell
20:00 CET	1-1 Sergi Miras 24' 1st Hf GP; 2-1 Luís Fer 1' 2nd Hf; 3-1 Sergi Miras 4' 2nd Hf; 4-1 Jordi Ferretti 2nd Hf		0-1 Truluer 8' 1st Hf	Referee: Miguel Guilherme, Luís Peixoto (Portugal)

9 November 2013	Benfica (Portugal)	13–3	(Switzerland) Diessbach	Pavilhão Império Bonança, Lisbon
15:00 WET	1-0 João Rodrigues 3' 1st Hf; 2-0 Carlos Lopez 4' 1st Hf; 3-2 Miguel Rocha 16' 1st Hf; 4-2 Miguel Rocha 21' 1st Hf LD; 5-2 Marc Coy 23' 1st Hf GP; 6-2 Miguel Rocha 1' 2nd Hf; 7-2 Diogo Neves 2' 2nd Hf; 8-2 Miguel Rocha 4' 2nd Hf LD; 9-2 Diogo Neves 5' 2nd Hf; 10-2 Miguel Rocha 6' 2nd Hf; 11-2 Miguel Rocha 11' 2nd Hf; 12-3 Miguel Rocha 21' 2nd Hf; 13-3 Miguel Rocha 22' 2nd Hf		2-1 Eduardo Mendes 6' 1st Hf; 2-2 Nº3 15' 1st Hf; 11-3 Nº23 20' 2nd Hf LD	Referee: Arnaud Esoli, Xavier Bleuzen (France)

23 November 2013	Diessbach (Switzerland)	2–5	(Spain) Vendrell	Sporthalle Diessbach, Diessbach
20:00 CET				Referee: Ulderico Barbarisi, Massimiliano Carmazzi (Italy)

23 November 2013	Quévert (France)	4–5	(Portugal) Benfica	Sale de Dinan, Quévert
21:00 CET	1-1 Maxi Oliva 9' 1st Hf; 2-4 Maxi Oliva 7' 2nd Hf; 3-5 nº 13 20' 2nd Hf; 4-5 Toni Seró LD 15ªF 23' 2nd Hf		0-1 João Rodrigues 7' 1st Hf; 1-2 Carlos "Carlitos" López 22' 1st Hf; 1-3 Marc Coy 3' 2nd Hf; 1-4 Diogo Rafael "Chiquinho" 6' 2nd Hf; 2-5 Marc Coy 11' 2nd Hf	Referee: Raffaele Strippoli, Salvatore Tartarelli (Italy)

14 December 2013	Quévert (France)	9–2	(Switzerland) Diessbach	Sale de Dinan, Quévert
21:00 CET				Referee: Tomas Ullrich, Tomas Ehlert (Germany)

14 December 2013	Vendrell (Spain)	3–6	(Portugal) Benfica	Pav. CE Vendrell, Vendrell
20:00 CET	1-0 Sergi Miras 3´1st Hf; 2-4 Jordi Ferrer 10´2nd Hf; 3-5 Angel Rodriguez 11´2nd Hf		1-1 João Rodrigues 14´1st Hf; 1-2 Diogo Rafael 21´1st Hf; 1-3 Miguel Rocha 4´2nd Hf; 1-4 Miguel Rocha 6´2nd Hf; 2-5 Diogo Rafael 11´ 2nd Hf; 3-6 Diogo Rafael 18´2nd Hf	Referee: Gianni Fermim, Giovanni Andrisani (Italy)

18 January 2014	Diessbach (Switzerland)	3–3	(France) Quévert	Sporthalle Diessbach, Diessbach
17:30 CET				Referee: Frank Schaffer, Torstern Flossel (Germany)

18 January 2014	Benfica (Portugal)	1–3	(Spain) Vendrell	Pavilhão Império Bonança, Lisbon
20:00 WET	Diogo Rafel (1)		Sergi Miras (1) +(1) GP; Eloi Albesa (1) LD	Referee: Enrico Armati, Roland Eggiman (Switzerland)

8 February 2014	Quévert (France)	4–3	(Spain) Vendrell	Sale de Dinan, Quévert
20:00 CET	1-1 Maxi Oliva; 2-1 Toni Seró; 3-3 Toni Seró; 4-3 Toni Seró		1-0 Jordi Ferrer; 2-2 Jordi Creus; 2-3 Carlos Cortijo	Referee: Paulo Rainha, Rui Torres (Portugal)

8 February 2014	Diessbach (Switzerland)	2–11	(Portugal) Benfica	Sporthalle Diessbach, Diessbach
21:00 CET			Miguel Rocha (2); João Rodrigues (2); Carlos "Carlitos" López (1); Esteban Ábalos "Tuco" (1); Diogo Rafael "Chiquinho" (1); Valter Neves (2); Marc Coy (1); Diogo Neves (1)	Referee: Franco Ferrari, Matteo Galoppi (Italy)

22 February 2014	Vendrell (Spain)	9–6	(Switzerland) Diessbach	Pav. CE Vendrell, Vendrell
21:00 CET	1-0 Jordi Ferrer 2´1st Hf; 2-1 Carlos Cortijo 18' 1st Hf; 3-1 Von Almmen (own goal) 24' 1st Hf; 4-1 Sergi Miras 25' 1st Hf; 5-1 Carlos Cortijo 26' 2nd Hf; 6-3 Sergi Miras 32' 2nd Hf; 7-5 Jordi Ferrer 37' 2nd Hf; 8-5 Jordi Ferrer 39' 2nd Hf; 9-5 Àngel Rodríguez 39' 2nd Hf		1-1 Kissling 13' 1st Hf; 5-2 Kissling 27' 2nd Hf; 5-3 Allmen 31´ 2ºP; 6-4 Kissling 33' 2nd Hf; 6-5 Kissling 36' 2nd Hf; 9-6 von Almmen 46' 2nd Hf	Referee: Pascal Hanras, Xavier Jacquart (France)

22 February 2014	Benfica (Portugal)	7–5	(France) Quévert	Pavilhão Império Bonança, Lisbon
20:00 WET	1-1 Carlos Lopez 1st Hf; 2-1 Miguel Rocha 1st Hf; 3-1 Miguel Rocha 1st Hf; 4-1 Marc Coy 1st Hf; 5-1 Miguel Rocha 2nd Hf; 6-3 Diogo Neves 2nd Hf; 7-4 Carlos Lopez 2nd Hf		0-1 Tony Sero 1st Hf; 5-2 Tony Sero 2nd Hf; 5-3 Tony Sero 2nd Hf; 6-4 Sergio Borgua 2nd Hf; 7-5 Sebastian Landrin 2nd Hf	Referee: Teresa Martinez, Fran Garcia (Spain)

=== Group C ===
Team	Pts	Pld	W	D	L	GF	GA	Diff
(Italy) Valdagno	15	6	5	0	1	29	19	+10
(Spain) Reus Deportiu	12	6	4	0	2	42	27	+15
(Portugal) Oliveirense	9	6	3	0	3	32	25	+7
(Germany) Iserlohn	0	6	0	0	6	17	49	−32

	VAL	REU	OLI	ISE
Valdagno		4–3	5–4	6–2
Reus Deportiu	4–6		8–5	11–2
Oliveirense	5–2	3–5		8–1
Iserlohn	1–6	7–11	4–7	

9 November 2013	Reus Deportiu (Spain)	11–2	(Germany) Iserlohn	Pazo dos Deportes do Réus Deportiu, Reus
21:30 CET				Referee: Roland Eggimann, Johannes Schneider (Switzerland)

9 November 2013	Valdagno (Italy)	5–4	(Portugal) Oliveirense	PalaLido, Valdagno
20:45 CET	1-0 Carlos Nicolia 1st Hf; 2-1 Tataranni GP 2nd Hf; 3-1 Carlos Nicolia 2nd Hf; 4-1 Carlos Nicolia 2nd Hf; 5-2 Tataranni LD 2nd Hf		1-1 Gonçalo Alves 1st Hf; 4-2 Gonçalo Alves 2nd Hf; 5-3 Gonçalo Alves 2nd Hf; 5-4 Gonçalo Alves 2nd Hf	Referee: António Gomez, José Gomez (Spain)

23 November 2013	Oliveirense (Portugal)	3–5	(Spain) Reus Deportiu	Pavilhão Dr. Salvador Machado, Oliveira de Azeméis
17:00 WET	1-3 Rúben Pereira 19' 1st Hf; 2-4 Gonçalo Alves 22' 2nd Hf; 3-4 Gonçalo Suíssas 23' 2nd Hf		0-1 Jepi Selva 9' 1st Hf; 0-2 Albert Casanovas 9' 2nd Hf; 0-3 Jordi Adroher 12' 2nd Hf; 1-4 Joan Salvat 20' 2nd Hf; 3-5 Xavi Rubio 24'58 2nd Hf	Referee: Giuseppe Bonuccelli, Rossano Rotelli (Italy)

23 November 2013	Iserlohn (Germany)	1–6	(Italy) Valdagno	Pav. Iserlohn, Iserlohn
20:00 CET	1-1 Glowka 19' 1st Hf		1-0 Nicolia 14' 1st Hf; 2-1 Festa 20' 1st Hf; 3-1 Nicolia 24' 1st Hf; 4-1 Festa 17' 2nd Hf; 5-1 Tataranni 24' 2nd Hf; 6-1 Festa 25' 2nd Hf	Referee: Xavier Bleuzen, Arnaud Esoli (France)

14 December 2013	Iserlohn (Germany)	4–7	(Portugal) Oliveirense	Pav. Iserlohn, Iserlohn
20:00 CET			Gonçalo Alves (4); Tó Silva (2); Gonçalo Suíssas (1)	Referee: Ulderico Barbarisi, Carlo Corponi (Italy)

14 December 2013	Reus Deportiu (Spain)	4–6	(Italy) Valdagno	Pazo dos Deportes do Réus Deportiu, Reus
21:30 CET	1-0 Jepi Selva 3´1st Hf; 2-2 Jordi Adroher 18´1st Hf; 3-4 Jepi Selva 6´2nd Hf; 4-6 Albert Casanovas GP 40´´ to the end		1-1 Diego Nicolleti 10´1st Hf; 1-2 Massimo Tataranni 15´1st Hf; 2-3 Massimo Tataranni 20´1st Hf; 2-4 Giullio Cocco 3´2nd Hf; 3-5 Giullio Cocco 14´2nd Hf; 3-6 Massimo Tataranni 23´2nd Hf	Referee: Joaquim Pinto, Rui Torres (Portugal)

18 January 2014	Oliveirense (Portugal)	8–1	(Germany) Iserlohn	Pavilhão Dr. Salvador Machado, Oliveira de Azeméis
17:00 WET	Tó Silva (4); Ruben Pereira (1); Gonçalo Alves (1); Gonçalo Suissas (1); Poka (1)			Referee: Giovanni Andrisani, Gianni Fermi (Italy)

18 January 2014	Valdagno (Italy)	4–3	(Spain) Reus Deportiu	PalaLido, Valdagno
21:00 CET	1-1 Tataranni 14'; 2-2 Tataranni 35'; 3-2 Tataranni 38'; 4-3 Carlos Nicolia 49' GP		0-1 Jordi Adroher 12'; 1-2 Joan Salvat 21'; 3-3 Albert Casanovas 41'	Referee: Miguel Guillherme, Luis Peixoto (Portugal)

8 February 2014	Iserlohn (Germany)	7–11	(Spain) Reus Deportiu	Pav. Iserlohn, Iserlohn
15:30 CET			0-1 Xavier Costa 1st Hf; 0-2 Xavier Costa 1st Hf; 5-3 Albert Casanovas 3' 2nd Hf; 5-4 Xavier Costa 5' 2nd Hf; 5-5 Marc Olle PWP 4x3 8' 2nd Hf; 5-6 Albert Casanovas 10' 2nd Hf; 5-7 Marc Olle 10' 2nd Hf; 6-8 Jepi Selva 11' 2nd Hf; 7-9 Xavier Costa 18' 2nd Hf; 7-10 Xavier Costa 19' 2nd Hf; 7-11 Marc Olle 21' 2nd Hf	Referee: Paulo Romão, Ricardo Leão (Portugal)

8 February 2014	Oliveirense (Portugal)	5–2	(Italy) Valdagno	Pavilhão Dr. Salvador Machado, Oliveira de Azeméis
17:00 WET	1-0 Gonçalo Alves 1st Hf; 2-0 Gonçalo Alves 2nd Hf; 3-0 Tó Silva GP 2nd Hf; 4-0 Gonçalo Suíssas 2nd Hf; 5-1 Tó Silva GP 2nd Hf		4-1 Massimo Tataranni LD 10thF 2nd Hf; 5-2 Massimo Tataranni 2nd Hf	Referee: Óscar Valverde, Francisco Garcia (Spain)

22 February 2014	Reus Deportiu (Spain)	8–5	(Portugal) Oliveirense	Pazo dos Deportes do Réus Deportiu, Reus
21:00 CET	Jepi Selva (1); Xavi Costa (2); Albert Casanovas (3); Jordi Adroher (1); Xavi Rubio (1)		To Silva (1); Gonçalo Alves (2); Ruben Pereira (1); Diogo Silva (1)	Referee: Alessandro Eccelsi, Alessandro Da Prato (Italy)

22 February 2014	Valdagno (Italy)	6–2	(Germany) Iserlohn	PalaLido, Valdagno
21:00 CET				Referee: Juan Prades, Alberto Garrote (Spain)

=== Group D ===
Team	Pts	Pld	W	D	L	GF	GA	Diff
(Spain) Barcelona	15	6	5	0	1	42	15	+27
(Portugal) Porto	15	6	5	0	1	36	19	+17
(Italy) Viareggio	3	6	2	0	4	18	32	−14
(Germany) Herringen	0	6	0	0	6	22	52	−30

	BAR	POR	VIA	HER
Barcelona		7–0	5–0	14–4
Porto	6–2		10–2	10–3
Viareggio	1–4	3–4		7–5
Herringen	4–10	2–6	4–5	

9 November 2013	Viareggio (Italy)	3–4	(Portugal) Porto	PalaBarsacchi, Viareggio
21:00 CET	Davide Montaran (1); Martin Montivero (1); Fernando Montigel (1)		Ricardo Barreiros (1); Caio (3)	Referee: Óscar Valverde, Francisco Garcia (Spain)

9 November 2013	Barcelona (Spain)	14–4	(Germany) Herringen	Palau Blaugrana, Barcelona
12:30 CET				Referee: Xavier Jacquart, Pascal Hanras (France)

23 November 2013	Herringen (Germany)	4–5	(Italy) Viareggio	Glückauf–Halle, Hamm-Herringen
18:00 CET				Referee: Enrico Armati, Roland Eggimann (Switzerland)

23 November 2013	Porto (Portugal)	6–2	(Spain) Barcelona	Dragão Caixa, Porto
17:00 WET	1-0 Ricardo Oliveira "Caio" 4' 1st Hf; 2-0 Ricardo Oliveira "Caio" 9' 1st Hf; 3-0 Ricardo Oliveira "Caio" GP 10' 1st Hf; 4-1 Hélder Nunes rec/GP 9' 2nd Hf; 5-2 Hélder Nunes LD 19' 2nd Hf; 6-2 Pedro Moreira 22' 2nd Hf		3-1 Reinaldo Garcia 16' 1st Hf; 4-2 Marc Torra LD 12' 2nd Hf	Attendance: 2,115; Referee: Alessandro da Prato, Alessandro Eccelsi (Italy)

14 December 2013	Porto (Portugal)	10–3	(Germany) Herringen	Dragão Caixa, Porto
15:00 WET	1-0 Vítor Hugo 26´´ 1st Hf; 2-1 Vitor Hugo 9´ LD 1st Hf; 3-2 Ricardo Barreiros 16´1st Hf; 4-2 Ricardo Barreiros 20´1st Hf; 5-2 Jorge Silva 21´1st Hf; 6-3 Jorge Silva 7´2nd Hf; 7-3 Tiago Losna 18´2nd Hf; 8-3 Helder Nunes 20´2nd Hf; 9-3 Vitor Hugo 21´2nd Hf; 10-3 Helder Nunes 23´2nd Hf		1-1 Robin 8´1st Hf; 2-2 Robin 11´1st Hf; 5-3 Lukas recharge LD 4´2nd Hf	Referee: Arnaud Esoli, Xavier Bleuzen (France)

14 December 2013	Viareggio (Italy)	1–4	(Spain) Barcelona	PalaBarsacchi, Viareggio
21:00 CET	David Motaran (1)		Marc Torra (1); Raül Marín (1); Marc Gual (1); Reinaldo Garcia (1)	Referee: Luis Peixoto, Miguel Guilherme (Portugal)

18 January 2014	Herringen (Germany)	2–6	(Portugal) Porto	Glückauf–Halle, Hamm-Herringen
18:00 CET			Hélder Nunes(1); Vítor Hugo (2); Ricardo Barreiros (2); Pedro Moreira (1)	Referee: Ulderico Barbarisi, Massimiliano Carmazzi (Italy)

18 January 2014	Barcelona (Spain)	5–0	(Italy) Viareggio	Palau Blaugrana, Barcelona
19:00 CET	1-0 Sergi Panadero 1st Hf; 2-0 Matias Pascual 1st Hf; 3-0 Pablo Álvarez 2nd Hf; 4-0 Marc Torra GP 2nd Hf; 5-0 Raül Marín 2nd Hf			Referee: Jorge Ventura, Joaquim Carplho (Portugal)

9 February 2014	Porto (Portugal)	10–2	(Italy) Viareggio	Dragão Caixa, Porto
15:30 WET	1-0 Helder Nunes 1´1st Hf; 2-0 Caio 8´1st Hf; 3-0 Jorge Silva 14´1st Hf; 4-0 Jorge Silva 15´1st Hf; 5-1 Helder Nunes 17´1st Hf; 6-1 Jorge Silva 22´1st Hf; 7-1 Pedro Moreira 25´1st Hf; 8-2 Ricardo Barreiros 4' 2nd Hf; 9-2 Caio 13' 2nd Hf; 10-2 Hélder Nunes 23' 2nd Hf		4-1 Alessandro Bertolucci 15' 1st Hf; 7-2 Montigel 2' 2nd Hf	Referee: Issac Sanz, Sergi Mayor (Spain)

8 February 2014	Herringen (Germany)	4–10	(Spain) Barcelona	Glückauf–Halle, Hamm-Herringen
17:00 CET	1-3 Kevin Karschau 21' 1st Hf; 2-3 Lukas Karschau 23' 1st Hf; 3-5 Kevin Karschau 9' 2nd Hf; 4-8 Lukas Karschau rec.GP 14' 2nd Hf		0-1 Pablo Álvarez 2' 1st Hf; 0-2 Reinaldo "Nalo" Garcia 9' 1st Hf; 0-3 Raül Marín 13' 1st Hf; 2-4 Pablo Álvarez 24' 1st Hf; 2-5 Raül Marín 1' 2nd Hf; 3-6 Pablo Álvarez 11' 2nd Hf; 3-7 Marc Torra 12' 2nd Hf; 3-8 Pablo Álvarez 13' 2nd Hf; 4-9 Marc Torra 16' 2nd Hf; 4-10 Pablo Álvarez 19' 2nd Hf	Referee: Salvatore Tartarelli, Raffaele Strippoli (Italy)

22 February 2014	Viareggio (Italy)	7–5	(Germany) Herringen	PalaBarsacchi, Viareggio
21:00 CET				Referee: Alvaro de la Hera, Joaquim Lopez (Spain)

22 February 2014	Barcelona (Spain)	7–0	(Portugal) Porto	Palau Blaugrana, Barcelona
21:00 CET	Matías Pascual (2); Marc Torra (2); Pablo Álvarez (1); Reinaldo García (1); Sergi Panadero (1)			Referee: Rossano Rotelli, Franco Ferrari (Italy)

== Quarter-finals ==
In the quarter-finals, the group stage winners played against the group stage runners-up over two legs, in a home-and-away basis. The first leg matches were played on 29 March and the second leg matches were played on 12 April 2014.

Team 1	Agg.	Team 2	1st leg	2nd leg
Porto (Portugal)	7–5	(Spain) Liceo	1–2	4–3 (2–0 p)
Reus Deportiu (Spain)	6–7	(Portugal) Benfica	5–2	1–5 (aet)
Vendrell (Spain)	11–10	(Italy) Valdagno	4–6	7–4
Valongo (Portugal)	3–10	(Spain) Barcelona	2–3	1–7

== Final four ==
The quarter-final winners contested a final four tournament, held at the Palau Blaugrana in Barcelona. The semi-finals were played on 3 May and the final was played on 4 May 2014.

Semi-finals
3 May 2014
(Portugal) Porto	6
(Spain) Vendrell	3
3 May 2014
(Portugal) Benfica	2
(Spain) Barcelona	3

Final
4 May 2014
(Portugal) Porto	1
(Spain) Barcelona	3

=== Semi-finals ===
3 May 2014
16:15 CEST

Porto (Portugal)	6–3	(Spain) Vendrell
1-0 Jorge Silva (9', 1st Hf); 2-0 Jorge Silva (13', 1st Hf); 3-1 Vitor Hugo (25', 1st Hf); 4-1 Helder Nunes (7', 2nd Hf); 5-1 Caio (8', 2nd Hf); 6-3 Hélder Nunes, LD 10th (25', 2nd Hf)	Report	2-1 Jordi Ferrer (23', 1st Hf); 5-2 Eloi Albesa (23', 2nd Hf); 5-3 Sergi Miras (23', 2nd Hf)

Palau Blaugrana, Barcelona
Referee: Franco Ferrari, Matteo Galoppi (Italy)
3 May 2014
18:15 CEST

Benfica (Portugal)	2–3	(Spain) Barcelona
1-0 João Rodrigues (6', 1st Hf); 2-3 João Rodrigues, LD 15th (22', 2nd Hf)	Report	1-1 Matias Pascual (17', 1st Hf); 1-2 Pablo Álvarez (23', 2nd Hf); 1-3 Marc Gual (6', 2nd Hf)

Palau Blaugrana, Barcelona
Referee: Alessandro Eccelsi, Alessandro Da Prato (Italy)

=== Final ===
4 May 2014
12:00 CEST

Porto (Portugal)	1–3	(Spain) Barcelona
1-1 Hélder Nunes (2'21 2nd Hf)	Report	0–1 Marc Torra (17'30 1st Hf); 1–2 Xavi Barroso (13'47 2nd Hf); 1–3 Marc Torra (18'47 2nd Hf)

Palau Blaugrana, Barcelona
Referee: Franco Ferrari, Alessandro Eccelsi (Italy)

2013–14 CERH European League winners
(Spain)
Barcelona
20th title

== See also ==
- 2013–14 CERS Cup
- 2013–14 CERH Women's European League
