= Busswil bei Büren =

- Former municipality
- Flag Coat of arms
- Location of Busswil bei Büren
- Location within Switzerland Location within Canton of Bern
- Coordinates: 47°5′N 7°19′E
- Country: Switzerland
- Canton: Bern
- District: Seeland

Government
  - Mayor: Rolf Christen BDP

Area
  - Total: 3.10 km^{2} (1.20 sq mi)
- Elevation: 437 m (1,434 ft)

Population (31 December 2010)
  - Total: 1,905
  - Density: 615/km^{2} (1,590/sq mi)
- Time zone: UTC+01:00 (CET)
  - Summer (DST): UTC+02:00 (CEST)
- Postal code: 3292
- SFOS number: 384
- ISO 3166 code: CH-BE
- Surrounded by: Büetigen, Lyss, Studen, Worben
- Website: www.busswil.ch

Busswil bei Büren is a former municipality in the Seeland administrative district in the canton of Bern in Switzerland. On 1 January 2011 it was merged with the municipality of Lyss.

== Geography ==
Busswil is located on the old Aare river, the part of the Aar river that still flows from Aarberg to Büren after the river was corrected in the 19th century to stop the flooding which had been completely inundating Busswil since ancient times. In those days the Celts from neighbouring villages to the north used the "Obererer Weg" to travel to the market town of Lyss. Also of note is the ancient oak tree in the middle of a field next to the Länggasse, at which Napoleon is said to have rested with his troops on the way back from his Austrian campagne.

Busswil has a bakery, a post office, two small supermarkets (Co-Op and Denner), a tea-room, a hotel (Rössli), restaurant (Bahnhof), and a railway station.

The neighbouring municipalities are Büetigen, Worben, Studen and Lyss.

Busswil bei Büren has an area, as of 2009, of 3.05 km^{2} (1.18 sq mi). Of this area, 1.57 km^{2} (0.61 sq mi) or 51.5% is used for agricultural purposes, while 0.87 km^{2} (0.34 sq mi) or 28.5% is forested. Of the rest of the land, 0.6 km^{2} (0.23 sq mi) or 19.7% is settled (buildings or roads), 0.02 km^{2} (4.9 acres) or 0.7% is either rivers or lakes and 0.01 km^{2} (2.5 acres) or 0.3% is unproductive land.

Of the built up area, industrial buildings make up 2.0% of the total area while housing and buildings made up 8.9% and transportation infrastructure made up 7.5%. 28.2% of the total land area is heavily forested with oak, birch and beech trees but sadly much of this will be destroyed by the politically influential Vigier Beton gravel and sand company who are extending the area of their excavations. Of the agricultural land, 44.6% is used for growing crops and 5.6% is pastures, while 1.3% is used for orchards or vine crops. Most of the water in the municipality is in rivers, streams or underground springs of excellent quality (used as drinking water by several houses along the Länggasse) but the springs will also soon be destroyed by the extension of the above-mentioned Vigier Beton gravel and sand excavations.

== Population ==
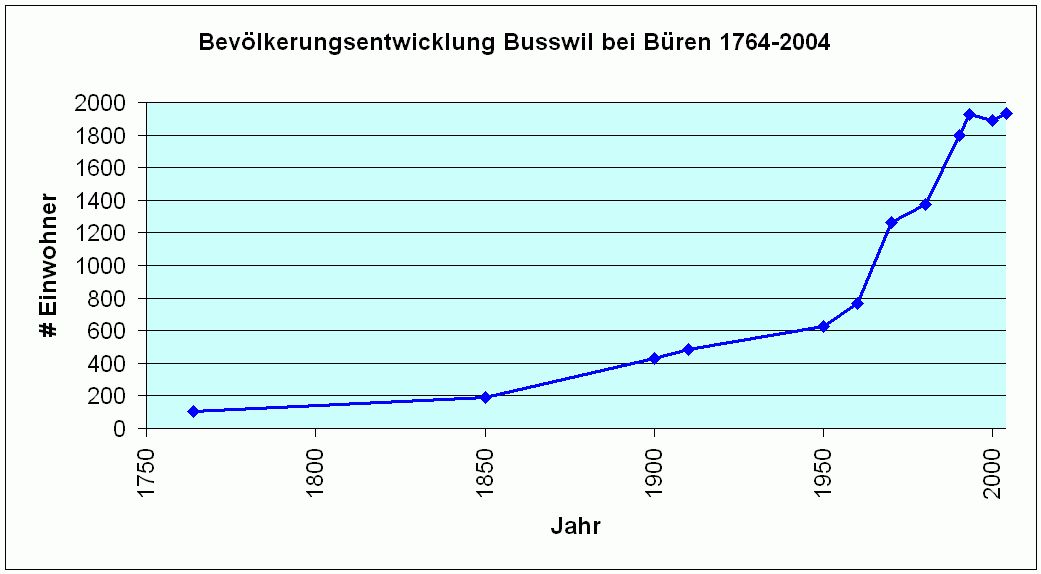
Historic population growth

Busswil bei Büren has a population (as of 31 December 2010) of 1905. As of 2007, 11.7% of the population was made up of foreign nationals. Over the last 10 years the population has grown at a rate of 4.6%. Most of the population (as of 2000) speaks German (90.6%), with French being second most common ( 1.8%) and Italian being third ( 1.7%).

In the 2007 election the most popular party was the SVP which received 33.8% of the vote. The next three most popular parties were the SPS (24.2%), the FDP (12.4%) and the Green Party (10.4%).

The age distribution of the population (as of 2000) is children and teenagers (0–19 years old) make up 27.1% of the population, while adults (20–64 years old) make up 62.5% and the seniors (over 64 years old) make up 10.4%. The entire Swiss population is generally well educated. In Busswil bei Büren about 72.6% of the population (between age 25-64) have completed either non-mandatory upper secondary education or additional higher education (either University or a Fachhochschule).

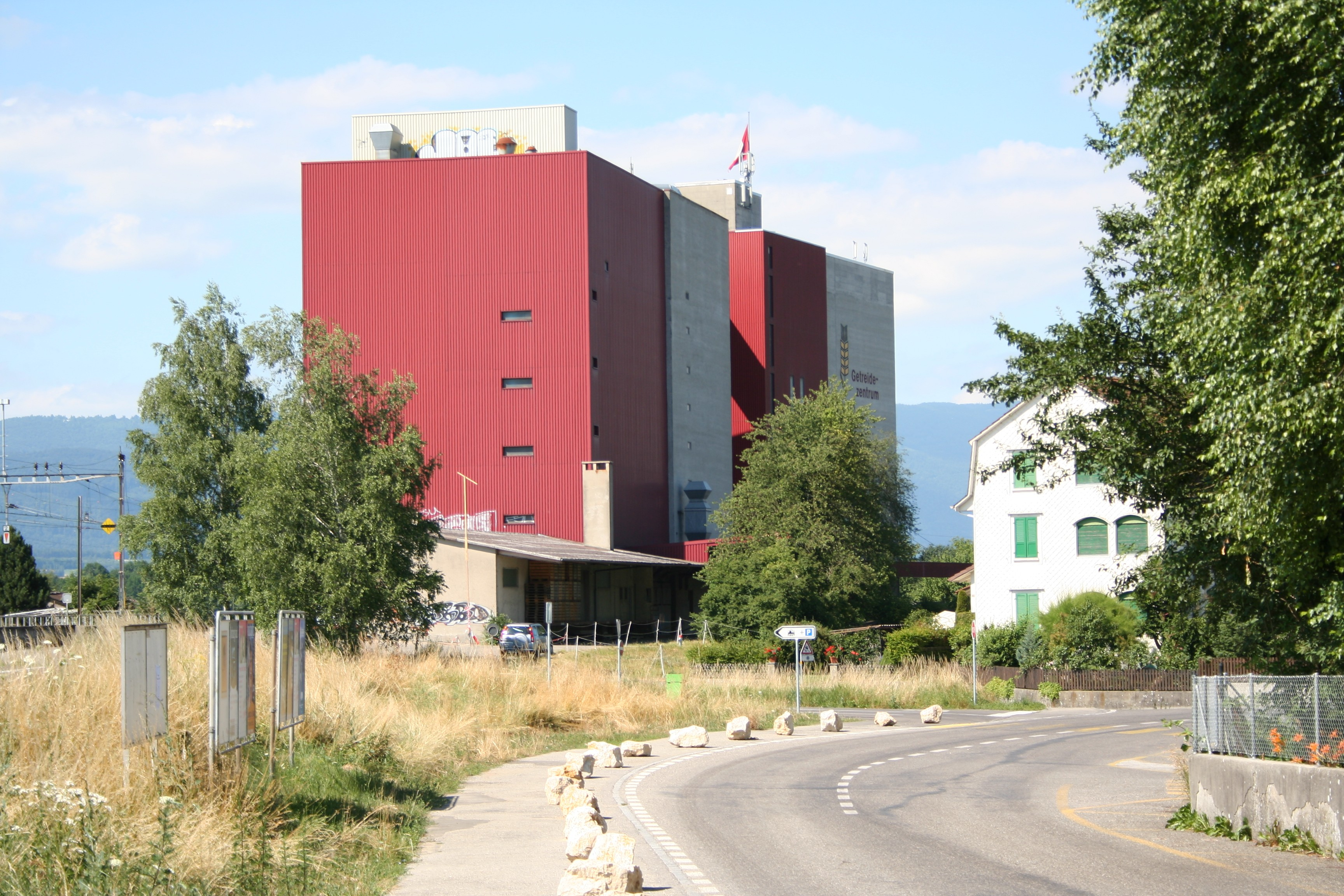
The largest building in Busswil is a grain silo

Busswil bei Büren has an unemployment rate of 1.21%. As of 2005, there were 27 people employed in the primary economic sector and about 8 businesses involved in this sector. 199 people are employed in the secondary sector and there are 20 businesses in this sector. 237 people are employed in the tertiary sector, with 38 businesses in this sector.

Besides the political municipality where everybody living is a member there exists a municipality of citizens where usually old families are member of. These families are called Bangerter, Eggli, Löffel, Stauffer and Stebler, they own 0.7 km² (23%) of the ground. That makes them very important when new buildings are planned.
