= 2019–20 OK Liga Femenina =

OK Liga Femenina
- Season: 2019–20
- Dates: 21 September 2019 – 3 June 2020
- Champions: Manlleu

The 2019–20 OK Liga Femenina was the 12th season of the top-tier league of women's rink hockey in Spain.

After being suspended due to the COVID-19 pandemic, Manlleu were declared champions as only counting the results of the first half of the season.

== Format changes ==
For the first time, the title will be decided by a playoff after the regular season.

The four first qualified teams will join the playoffs, in a best-of-three series format.

== Teams ==
OK Liga Femenina 2018–19 teams
OK Liga Femenina 2018–19 teams from Catalonia

Team	Arena	City/Area
Alcorcón	Prado de Santo Domingo	Alcorcón
Areces Ecopilas Pavitek Asturhockey	Municipal	Grado
Bigues i Riells	Pavelló d'Esports	Bigues i Riells
Cerdanyola	Can Xarau	Cerdanyola del Vallès
Cuencas Mineras Nortesport	Municipal	Lena
Garatge Plana Girona	Palau II	Girona
Generali Palau de Plegamans	Maria Víctor	Palau-solità i Plegamans
Las Rozas	Pabellón Municipal	Las Rozas
Manlleu Magic Studio	Pavelló d'Esports	Manlleu
Sant Cugat	Pavelló Municipal	Sant Cugat del Vallès
Telecable Gijón	Mata-Jove	Gijón
Vila-sana	Pavelló d'Esports	Vila-sana
Vilanova	Pavelló d'Esports	Vilanova i la Geltrú
Voltregà Stern Motor	Victorià Oliveras de la Riva	Sant Hipòlit de Voltregà

== Regular season ==
=== League table ===
Pos	Team	Pld	W	D	L	GF	GA	GD	Pts	Qualification or relegation
1	Manlleu Magic Studio	13	11	1	1	60	14	+46	34	Qualification to the European League
2	Generali Palau de Plegamans	13	11	1	1	51	12	+39	34	Qualification to the European League
3	Cerdanyola	13	9	2	2	53	26	+27	29	Qualification to the European League
4	Voltregà Stern Motor	13	7	5	1	31	20	+11	26	Qualification to the European League
5	Telecable Gijón	13	8	2	3	57	26	+31	26	Qualification to the European League
6	Bigues i Riells	13	7	2	4	34	28	+6	23	
7	Vila-sana	13	5	3	5	29	25	+4	18	
8	Garatge Plana Girona	13	5	1	7	35	44	−9	16	
9	Alcorcón	13	5	1	7	21	27	−6	16	
10	Vilanova	13	4	1	8	21	48	−27	13	
11	Sant Cugat	13	4	0	9	32	45	−13	12	
12	Las Rozas	13	4	0	9	26	63	−37	12	
13	Areces Ecopilas Pavitek Asturhockey	13	1	1	11	23	69	−46	4	
14	Cuencas Mineras Nortesport	13	0	0	13	29	55	−26	0	

Source: FEP.es

=== Results ===
Home \ Away	ALC	ARE	BIG	CER	GIR	CMI	PLE	ROZ	MAN	SCU	GIJ	VSA	VNO	VOL
Alcorcón	—	3–2		2–5		4–6	1–5	2–1		4–2	3–3	1–0		
Areces Ecopilas Pavitek Asturhockey	2–3	—		1–6		3–4	1–9	2–10	3–5		4–4	2–6	0–3	0–2
Bigues i Riells	3–1	7–1	—	2–3	6–2	8–3		4–2	0–4	2–1		1–1	6–4	
Cerdanyola	2–1		4–0	—	10–4		5–1	9–0		6–4			3–3	4–1
Garatge Plana Girona	2–1	9–3	3–7		—	4–3	0–2	1–3	1–3	1–3		3–1		
Cuencas Mineras Nortesport	3–4	1–3	3–4	2–4	9–5	—	1–5	1–3	3–6		2–3		1–2	2–5
Generali Palau de Plegamans		5–1	2–0	4–1	7–1	7–2	—				3–1		6–1	1–1
Las Rozas			2–5	0–1			1–8	—		2–5		1–4		
Manlleu Magic Studio	4–0	9–0		6–0		7–3	2–1	9–0	—		2–3	1–0		1–1
Sant Cugat		8–1		1–6	0–1	6–5	0–4			—	2–5	4–2	3–4	1–3
Telecable Gijón			5–1	1–2	6–2			14–0	2–4	3–2	—		7–0	3–4
Vila-sana		5–0		2–2		3–1	1–3		1–5	2–0	1–2	—	7–0	2–3
Vilanova	0–2		1–5	3–4	1–4			1–2	1–6		1–11	2–5	—	0–1
Voltregà Stern Motor		3–0	1–1		2–2			3–1	2–4		4–0	2–2	6–2	—

Updated to match(es) played on 8 March 2020. Source: FEP.es
Legend: Blue = home team win; Yellow = draw; Red = away team win.

== Copa de la Reina ==
2019 Copa de la Reina
Tournament details
- Arena: Riazor, A Coruña
- Dates: 19–22 March 2020

The 2020 Copa de la Reina was the 15th edition of the Spanish women's roller hockey cup. The draw was held in A Coruña on 30 January 2020.

For the first time, the tournament would be played together with the men's Copa del Rey. However, it was suspended due to the COVID-19 pandemic.

=== Bracket ===
Quarterfinals
19 March
Manlleu Magic Studio
Voltregà Stern Motor
19 March
Telecable Gijón
Bigues i Riells
20 March
Cerdanyola
Vila-sana
20 March
Generali Palau de Plegamans
Alcorcón

Semifinals
21 March
21 March

Final
22 March

Source: FEP
