= Sport in Asturias =

Sport in Asturias has always been dominated by football. Other popular sport activities include basketball, cycling, handball, volleyball, roller hockey, and rugby union. Asturias has also hosted a number of international events such as group stage games during the 1982 FIFA World Cup, series of the Davis Cup World Group, international roller hockey competitions, several cycling states of La Vuelta and several matches of the Spain national football team.

Asturias is also famous for several traditional sports, being the bowling the most important one.

== Football ==
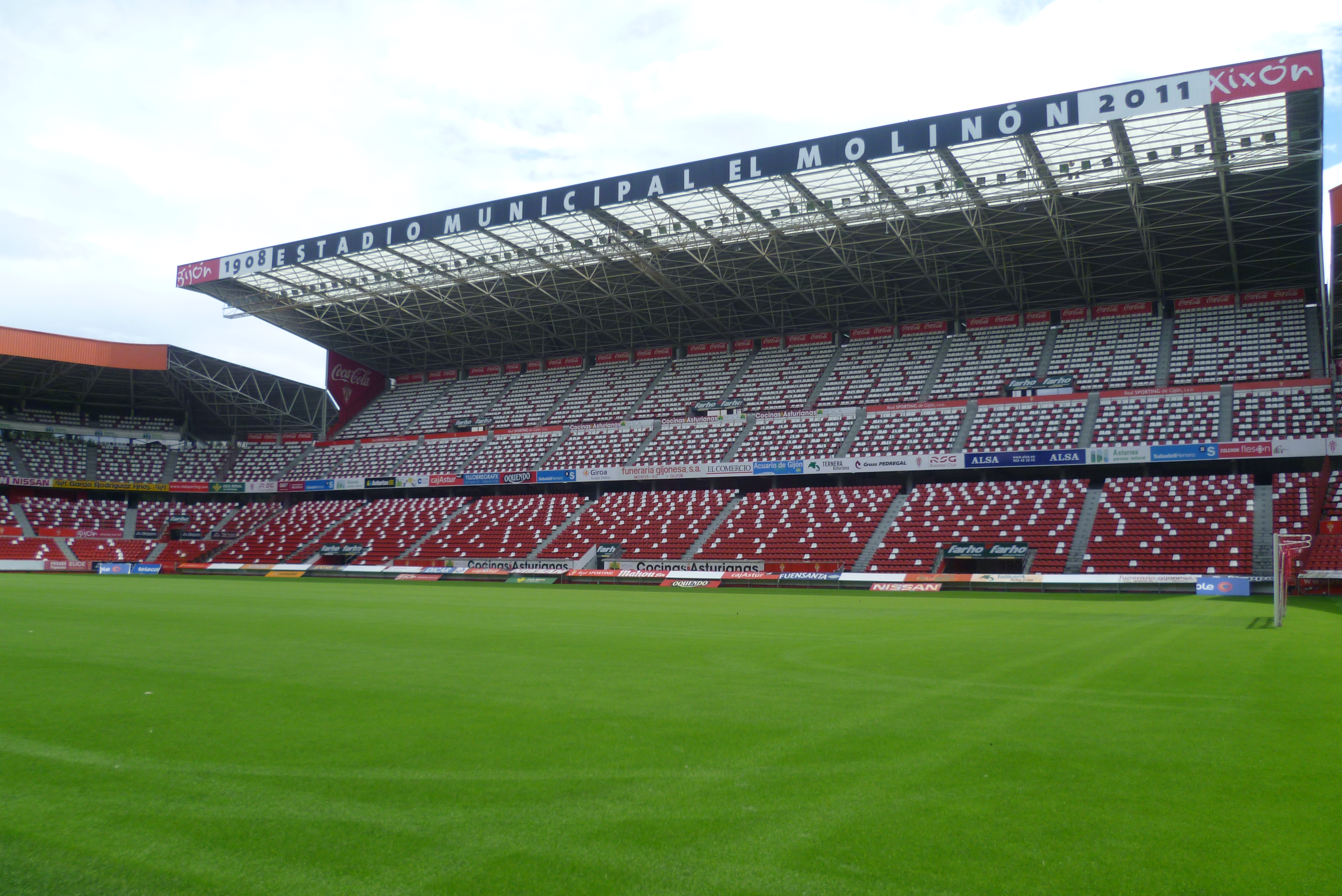
El Molinón stadium.

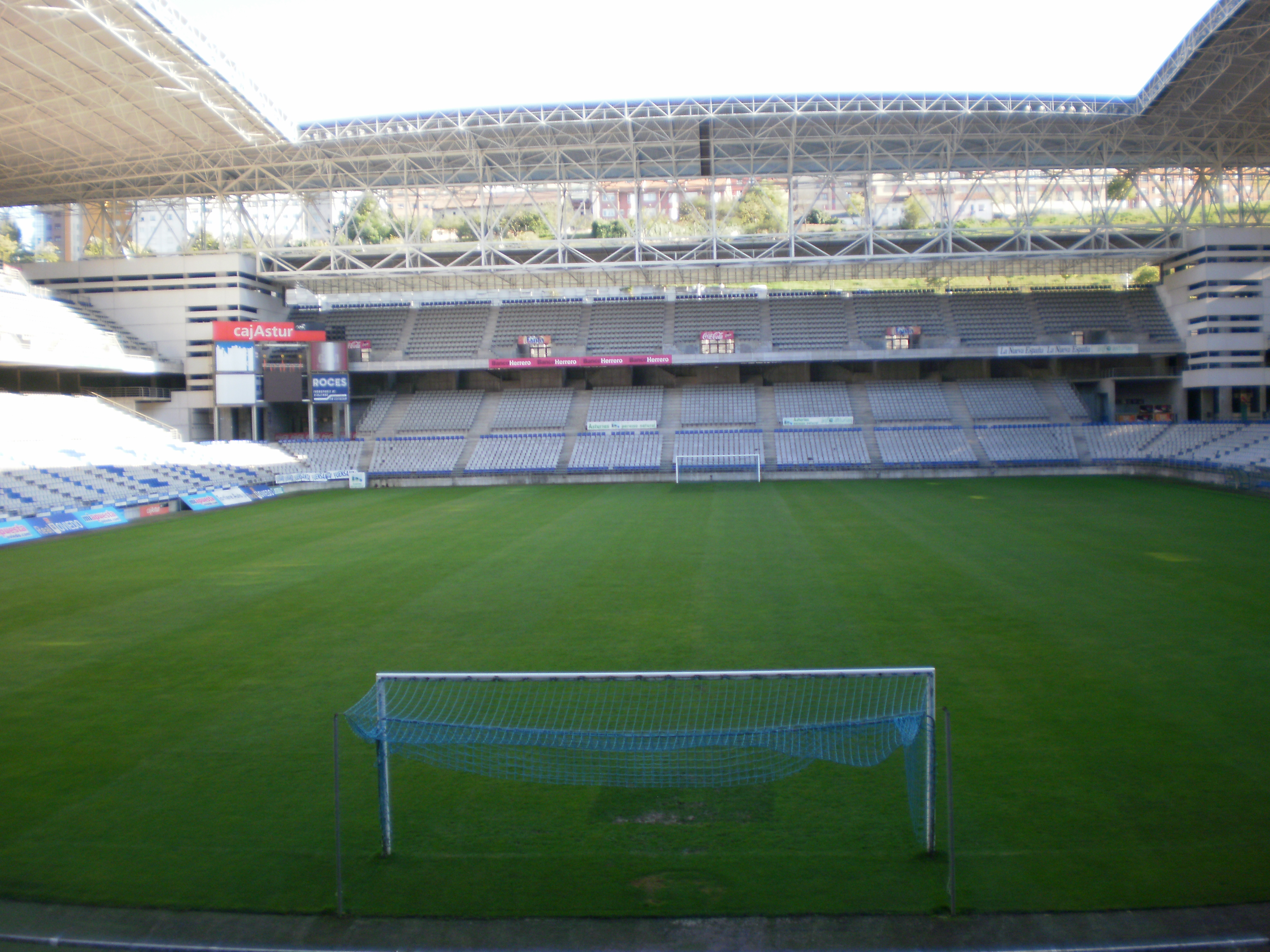
Carlos Tartiere stadium.

Association football is the most popular sport in Asturias. Sporting Gijón and Oviedo are the two most prolific teams in the region as they played more than 40 seasons in La Liga. When both teams meet, they play the Asturian derby. Other teams such as Avilés, Caudal and Langreo have played several years in the second division.

Oviedo Moderno is the main women's club in the region. The club from the capital is the only team in Asturias that played in the first division more than one season since its establishment as a one-group league. Gijón and Sporting Gijón have also played in the top tier.

The Asturias autonomous football team currently only plays the Spanish stage of the UEFA Regions' Cup, where only players from fourth tier and lower are eligible to represent the regional team.

Internationally, El Molinón and Carlos Tartiere hosted several matches of the Spanish team and also hosted the Group 2 during the 1982 FIFA World Cup. The most famous match was the Disgrace of Gijón; West Germany and Austria were accused of match-fixing after they ended the match with a 1–0 that qualified both teams and eliminated Algeria, who played previously in Oviedo.

Several Asturian players have played for Spain. David Villa won the World Cup in 2010, Luis Enrique, Abelardo and Javier Manjarín won the golden medal in the 1992 Olympics and Michu was the last Asturian who made his debut with the national team.

== Basketball ==
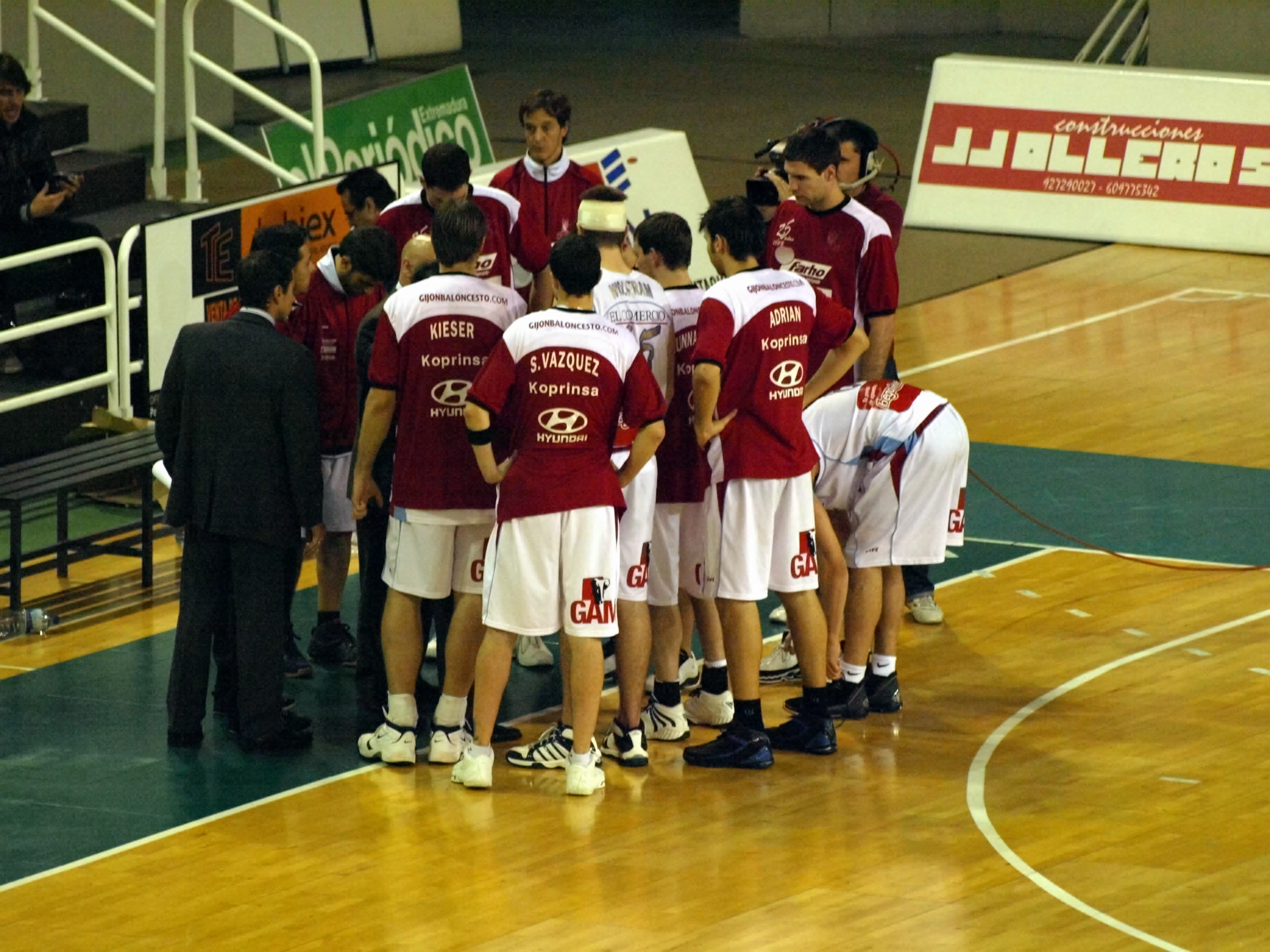
Gijón Baloncesto.

Basketball is the second sport in terms of attendance. Gijón Baloncesto, nowadays dissolved, was the first and only team in Asturias that played the Liga ACB, one of the major European basketball leagues. Oviedo is nowadays the most important team in the region and nowadays plays the second division. Other important teams in men's basketball are Círculo Gijón, team of the third tier and Gijón Basket, that plays in the fourth division.

In women's basketball, ADBA plays in the Liga Femenina 2.

Internationally, the Palacio Municipal de Deportes de Oviedo hosted the matches of the Group F during the 1986 FIBA World Championship.

== Handball ==
Despite not having any team in the elite, Asturias is nowadays one of the most prolific canteras in the Spanish handball. Players as Alberto Entrerríos, Raúl Entrerríos, Rubén Garabaya or Carlos Ruesga have played for the Spain men's national handball team. Asturian Borja Vidal also played internationally, but for Qatar. Women like Jessica Alonso have also played internationally for Spain.

In terms of clubs, La Calzada plays the women's top league while Gijón and Oviedo play the second tier in women's handball and Grupo Covadonga in men's handball.

== Cycling ==
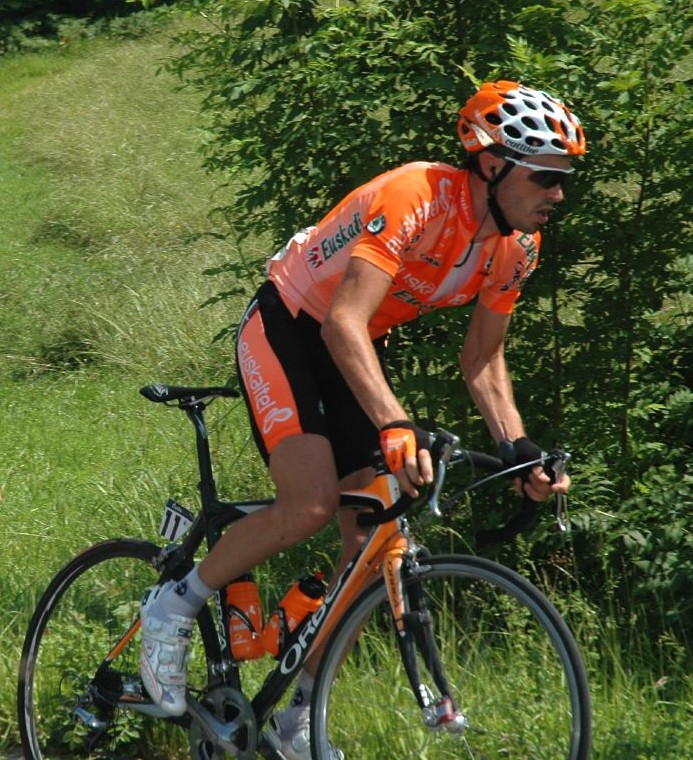
Samuel Sánchez.

As in other regions, cycling is one of the most followed sports in Asturias. As it is a mountainous region, the stages of the Vuelta a España that happen in Asturias are usually important for the final classification. Alto de L'Angliru or the Lagos de Covadonga are two of the most important stages. The Vuelta a Asturias is also an important race, with the Alto del Acebo or the Subida al Naranco as the main stage.

Samuel Sánchez, who won the gold medal in the 2008 Summer Olympics, and José Luis Rubiera are two of the most prolific racers in the region.

CLAS–Cajastur was a professional road cycling team based in Asturias, sponsored by Cajastur and Central Lechera Asturiana. It competed between 1988 and 1993, with Tony Rominger as the most known cyclist of the team.

== Roller hockey ==
Roller hockey is played in Asturias, especially in Oviedo and in the towns of the center of the region. The most important club in the region is Gijón Solimar, five times champion of the Women's European League, but at OK Liga Femenina also plays Cuencas Mineras, from Lena.

In men's roller hockey, Cibeles is the only Asturian team that achieved a national title by winning the Copa del Rey in 1980.

Areces, Asturhockey, Mieres, Oviedo and Oviedo Roller are other teams that, as Cibeles, also played the top tier.

== Skiing ==
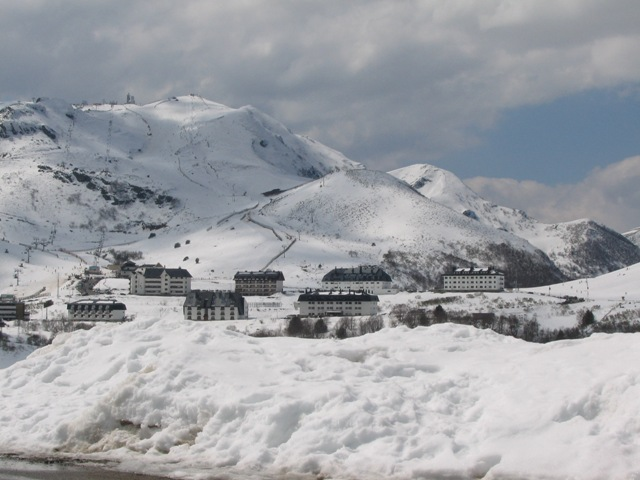
Valgrande-Pajares ski resort.

In the Cantabrian Mountains there are several ski resorts, being Valgrande-Pajares and Fuentes de Invierno the most important ones.

== Other sports ==
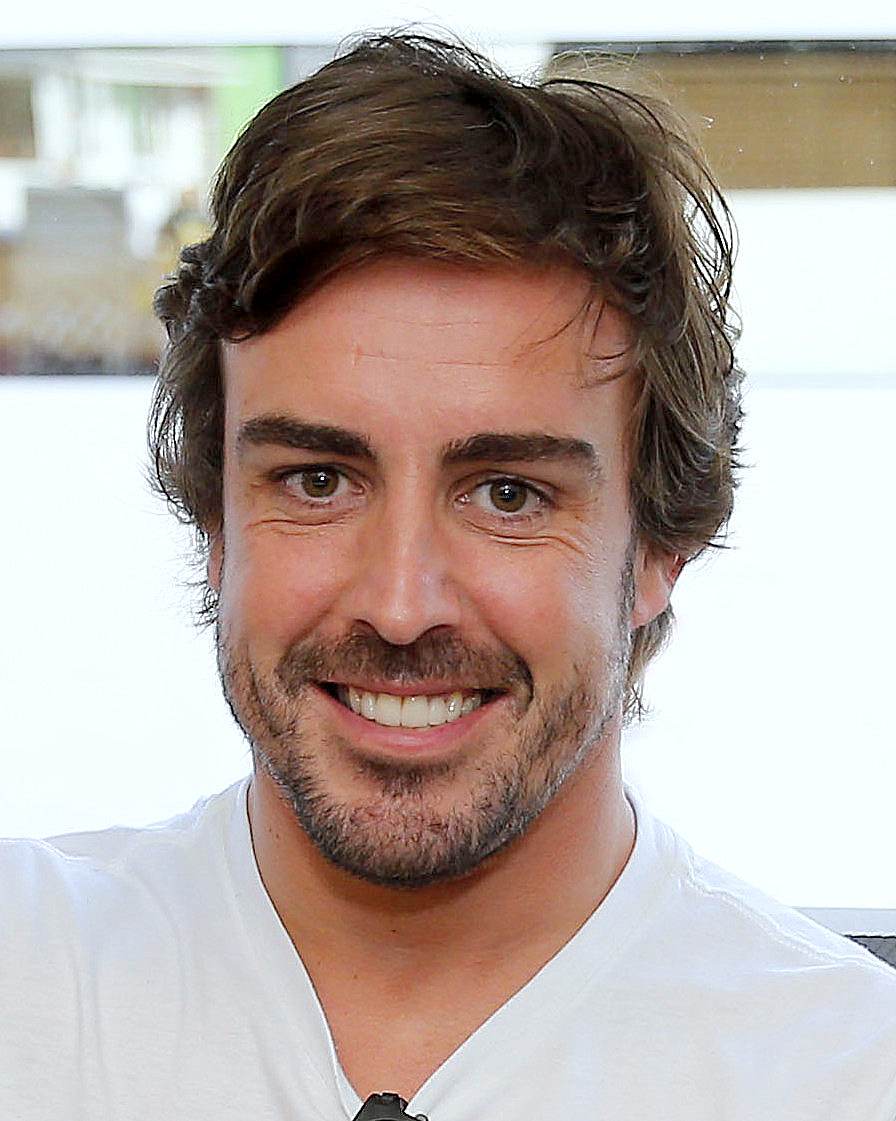
Fernando Alonso.

=== Motorsports ===
Fans of motorsports are numerous, and Formula One is followed due to Fernando Alonso.

The Rally Príncipe de Asturias is the oldest car rally in Spain and is part of the Spanish Rally Championship and the Western zone of the European Rally Championship.

=== Rugby union ===
Oviedo RC is the only Asturian team that have played at least one season in the División de Honor. Belenos is the second most successful team in the region.

=== Tennis ===
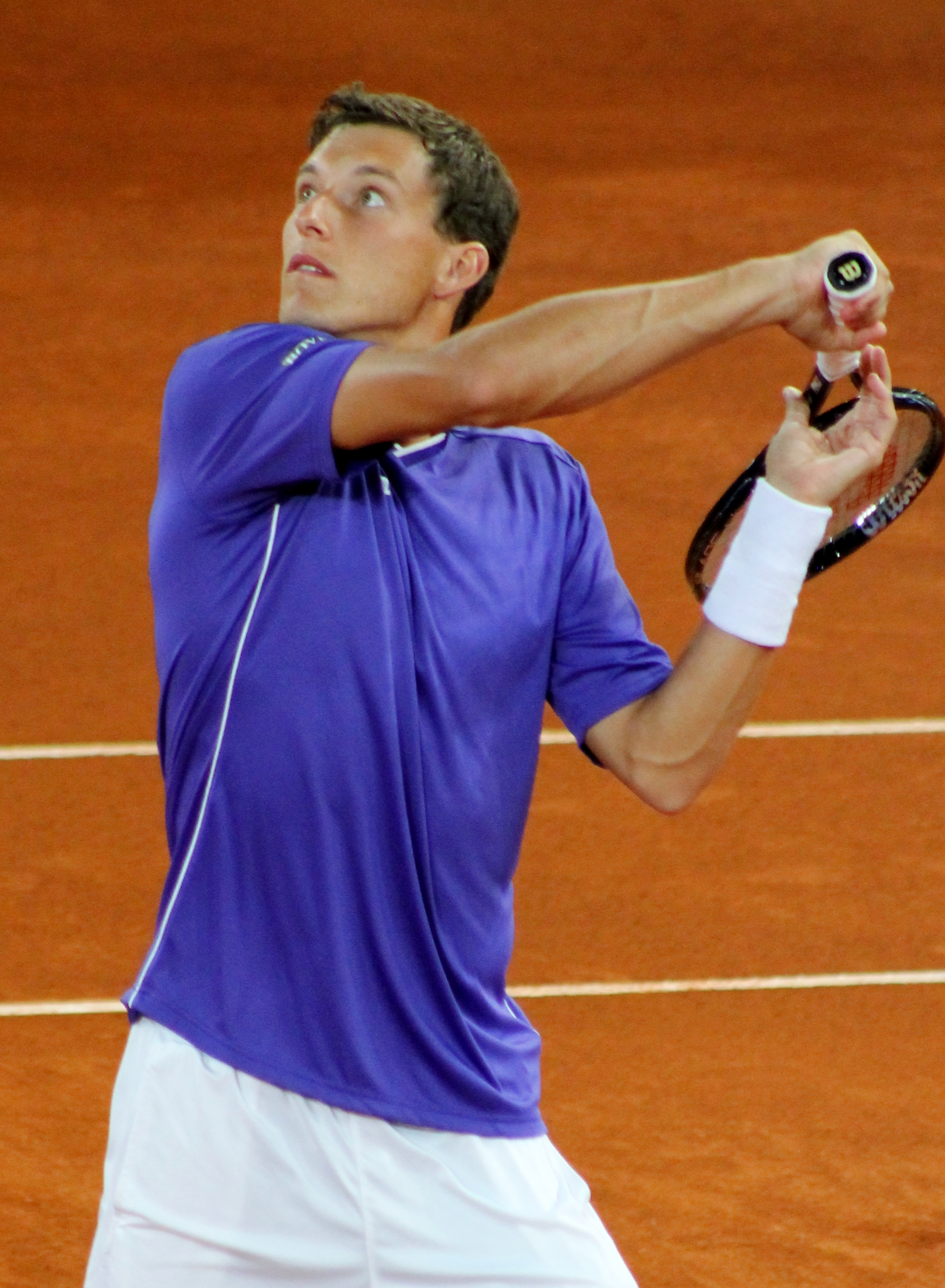
Pablo Carreño Busta.

Pablo Carreño Busta is the most prolific Asturian tennis player. Carreño won the bronze medal at the 2020 Summer Olympics, played several Grand Slam tournaments and also played World Group series for the Spain Davis Cup team. Other players like Galo Blanco played professionally.

Gijón and Oviedo both hosted series of the 2012 Davis Cup World Group.

=== Traditional sports ===
Bowling is the most important of the traditional sports in Asturias, mainly in the modality of cuatreada. Other sports like rana or llave are also played.

=== Volleyball ===
Women's volleyball was historically important as Medina Gijón was the first national champion from Asturias in any sport. Medina won the 1971–72, 1975–76 and 1977–78 seasons of the Spanish league.

Currently, it only has importance in Gijón, with Grupo Covadonga as its main representative, in the Superliga 2. During the 1990s, Gijón had three different teams in the top league.

=== American football ===
Gijón Mariners is currently the most prolific club in the region. It currently plays in the Serie A of the LNFA. Oviedo Madbulls competes in the Serie B.

== Asturias regional teams ==
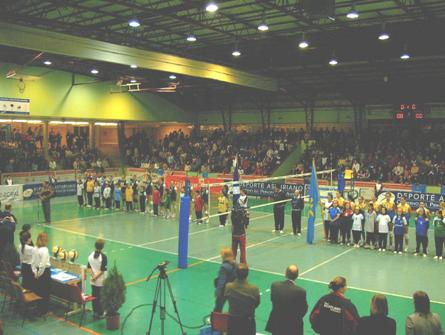
Asturias women's volleyball team against Scotland.

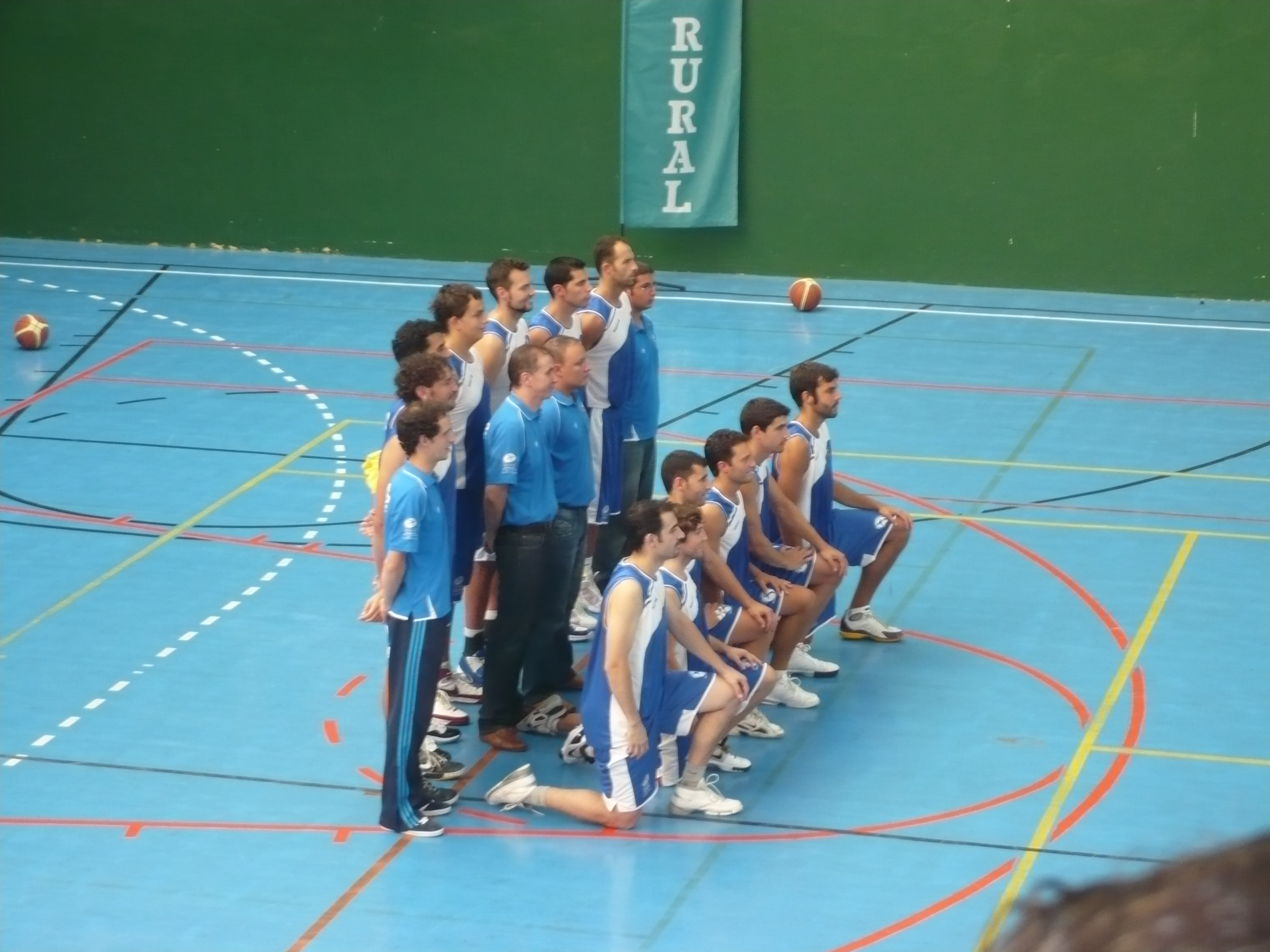
Asturias basketball team against Ivory Coast.

Specially during the 2000s, Asturias developed several autonomous teams for promoting Asturias abroad and the sport in the region.

=== Matches between Asturias and national teams ===
| Date | Sport | M/W | Host city | Rival | Score |
|---|---|---|---|---|---|
| 16 Jun 1934 | Football | M | Gijón | Mexico | 5–2 |
| 14 Oct 1969 | Handball | M | Gijón | Spain | 11–25 |
| 13 Jun 1987 | Handball | M | Ribadesella | United States | 24–27 |
| 23 Dec 2000 | Football | M | Oviedo | Macedonia | 1–0 |
| 29 Dec 2001 | Football | M | Gijón | Lithuania | 6–1 |
| 3 Jan 2002 | Handball | M | Gijón | Brazil | 28–22 |
| 27 Dec 2002 | Roller hockey | M | Oviedo | Portugal | 3–4 |
| 28 Dec 2002 | Football | M | Avilés | Honduras | 5–3 |
| 30 Dec 2003 | Handball | M | Avilés | Portugal | 27–18 |
| 29 Dec 2004 | Volleyball | W | Gijón | Scotland | 3–0 |
| 17 Dec 2005 | Wheelchair basketball | M | Gijón | Portugal | 46–56 |
| 28 Dec 2005 | Handball | W | Gijón | Iceland | 22–23 |
| 27 Dec 2006 | Roller hockey | M | Grado | Switzerland | 3–2 |
| 29 Dec 2007 | Handball | M | Avilés | Spain | 26–28 |
| 28 Jun 2009 | Basketball | M | Luanco | Ivory Coast | 55–69 |

== Major sports facilities ==
=== Stadiums ===
| Image | Stadium | Capacity | City | Inaugurated |
|---|---|---|---|---|
| | Carlos Tartiere | 30,500 | Oviedo | 2000 |
| | El Molinón | 29,029 | Gijón | 1908 |
| | Las Mestas | 11,000 | Gijón | 1942 |
| | Román Suárez Puerta | 5,352 | Avilés | 1943 |
| | El Bayu | 5,000 | Siero | 2006 |
| | Ganzábal | 4,024 | Langreo | 1922 |
| | Las Mestas (athletics) | 3,500 | Gijón | |
| | Miramar | 3,500 | Luanco | 1953 |
| | La Mata | 3,000 | Candás | |
| | Muro de Zaro | 3,000 | Avilés | |
| | Hermanos Antuña | 2,940 | Mieres | 1951 |
| | San Lázaro | 2,500 | Oviedo | |

=== Indoor arenas ===
| Image | Arena | Capacity | City | Inaugurated |
|---|---|---|---|---|
| | Palacio de los Deportes | 5,340 | Oviedo | 1975 |
| | Palacio de Deportes | 5,197 | Gijón | 1992 |
| | El Quirinal | 2,774 | Avilés | 2003 |
| | Juan Carlos Beiro | 2,286 | Langreo | 2007 |
| | Visiola Rollán | 1,800 | Mieres | 2008 |
| | La Arena | 1,500 | Gijón | 1966 |
| | Braulio García | 1,331 | Gijón | |
| | Luis Riera Posada (Pumarín) | 1,138 | Oviedo | |
