= Peñamellera Baja =

Peñamellera Baja El Valle Baju de Peñamellera (Asturian)
- Municipality
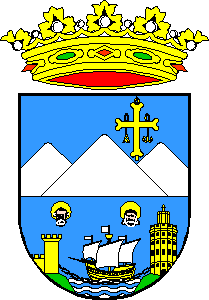
- Flag Coat of arms

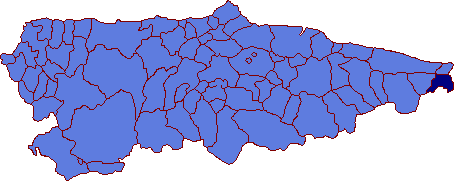

- Location in Spain
- Coordinates: 43°18′36″N 4°35′24″W
- Country: Spain
- Autonomous community: Asturias
- Province: Asturias
- Comarca: Oriente
- Judicial district: Llanes
- Capital: Panes

Government
  - Alcalde: José Manuel Fernández Díaz (PP)

Area
  - Total: 83.85 km^{2} (32.37 sq mi)
- Highest elevation: 1,560 m (5,120 ft)

Population (2025-01-01)
  - Total: 1,194
  - Density: 14.24/km^{2} (36.88/sq mi)
- Time zone: UTC+1 (CET)
  - Summer (DST): UTC+2 (CEST)
- Website: Official website

Peñamellera Baja (in Asturian: El Valle Baju de Peñamellera) is a municipality in the Autonomous Community of the Principality of Asturias, Spain. It is borderered to the north by Llanes and Ribadedeva, to the west by Peñamellera Alta, and to the east and south by the Autonomous Community of Cantabria.

== History ==
There have been some manifestations of Paleolithic art found in Peñamellera Baja. In La Loja cave, various stone tools were found that provides an important set of cave art corresponding to the Magdalenian age which show animal engravings such as horses and bison.

The first documented evidence of Peñamellera dates from 1032. The counts Piniolo and Aldonza exchanged territories with the Leonine King Bermudo III, which gave the counts half of Peñamellera. After complete incorporation into the realm of King Ferdinand II's territory, he relinquished Asturias from these areas for inclusion in the kingdom of Leon, although ecclesiastically this decision still depended on the bishopric of Oviedo.

In 1340, King Alfonso XI gave the people of Peñamellera jurisdiction, gaining representation without having to visit the sites of the Merindad of Asturias de Santillana. Subsequently various stately powers appeared such as Aguilar, who also occupied the lordship of Peñamellera. This measure brought about the appearance of stately towers and the patrimonialization of public office. Colosia towers and Siejo are examples of this. It is during this time that the intention to divide the valley into two administrative units arose, the high valley and the low valley (their separation was not effective until 1889).

In the modern age, the valley of Peñamellera forms part of the Commonwealth of the five valleys of the Burgos region. Between 1514 and 1522, Peñamellera joined together with San Vicente de la Barquera to become an independent jurisdiction. In 1749, it was added to Intendance of Burgos and Cane of Laredo, and was present at the formation of the province of Cantabria, in 1778.

Livestock and agriculture have always been present in the life of the valley, its people exempt from taxes from the sale of cattle due to a privilege that was granted by King Charles II.

The capital of the valley in its low cueto was established in Abándames. Each cueto, high and low, had a ruler, a noble judge for each one and one for the valley in general. The population was a mixture of country gentry and a minimal number of famous nobility lineage.

The valley also suffered from the war of independence, being occupied by French troops in 1809, when Colonel Gauthier broke surveillance of River and invaded the council back in 1810.

The most important historical event of this century is the return of Asturian land back to the territories of Peñamellera Baja in 1833, thanks to the new territorial distribution in Spain; a year later the valley of Peñamellera asked, along with Rivadedeva, re-entry into the Province of Santander. The request was denied, disassociating themselves from Cantabria and becoming part of the province of Oviedo. Then arguments began between Alles and Abándames for who would have the capital. In 1869, cuetos administratively separated the two remaining cuetos, so that Abándames remained as the low valley. This situation lasted until 1890, at which time the capital was transferred to Panes, a town that experienced a progressive increase in its population.

The emigration to America was popular among young people: they travelled abroad and went back years later to spend their fortunes building houses, palaces, schools and other services that benefited all the people, such as improvements in roads and the delivery of water. During the Spanish Civil War noted that the low cueto had the strength of the Republican Army under Manolin Alvarez, being conquered the area on September 9, 1937 by Navarre troops using the Condor Legion.

The history of Peñamellera Baja is basically the same as that of its neighbor, Alta, since their split in 1869.

== Demography ==
Like its neighbor Peñamellera Alta and most of the municipalities in the district, Peñamellera Baja has been characterized by a progressive population loss over the last century. In the first part of the 20th century, most emigration from Peñamellera Baja was directed overseas. In the second half of the century, people began to emigrate to other parts of Europe and to the Asturian industrial centers. Since the population peaked in 1930 at 4,910 inhabitants, there has been a significant decline in population, leaving the current population at 1,579.

Population loss has made demographic structures in the area quite unbalanced in terms of aging, and Peñamellera Baja now has a relatively high median age for the region. The same is not true for the sex ratio; Peñamellera Baja presents one of the most equal sex ratios in the whole region of the Picos de Europa. Currently, the majority of the population is concentrated around the Deva River in the north of the municipality, while the southern part is quite depopulated except for the parishes of San Esteban and Cuñaba.

In regard to economic activity, the agricultural sector remains the most important sector in the region, generating 46.52% of the jobs. Land used for crops represents a total of 2.21% of the territory, and more than 60% of the land is used for livestock. The livestock are predominantly vaccinated, as they are mainly oriented to milk production. They are also surveyed in the council heads of horses, goats and sheep.

The secondary sector creates 16.40% of the local employment, mainly concentrated in the construction sector and public works with 16.22%. Also important is the cheese industry, producing in San Esteban the Peñamellera cheese through a cooperative society, in Panes -Monje cheese and in Buelles, goat cheese.

The tertiary sector of services is based almost entirely on the city council and BreadsPanes, generating a total of 37.08% of the jobs, and covering much of the city's public services. Rural tourism has also experienced a significant growth thanks to the natural attractions in the area.

The de facto population, according to the tables published by the National Statistics Institute of 10 in 10 years had the November 1, 2011 amounted to 1322 people, 653 men and 669 women.

From: INE Archiv

== Parishes ==
- Abándames
- Alevia
- Buelles
- Cuñaba
- Merodio
- Panes
- Siejo
- Tobes

== Parades ==
- April Fair (a tradition taken from a popular Andalusian parade - April 12)
- San Isidro Labrador (May 15)
- San Roque (August 16)
- San Cipriano (September 15)

== Heritage ==
- Sierra del Cuera
- La Loja's cave
- Asturian Museum of Bolos
- White Willow Grove
- Argayu's forest
- San Juan's church

== See also ==
- List of municipalities in Asturias
