= Bowling Museum of Asturias =

Bowling museum in Peñamellera Baja, Asturias, Spain

Coordinates: 43°19′19″N 4°35′01″W

Bowling Museum of Asturias (Museo de los Bolos de Asturias)
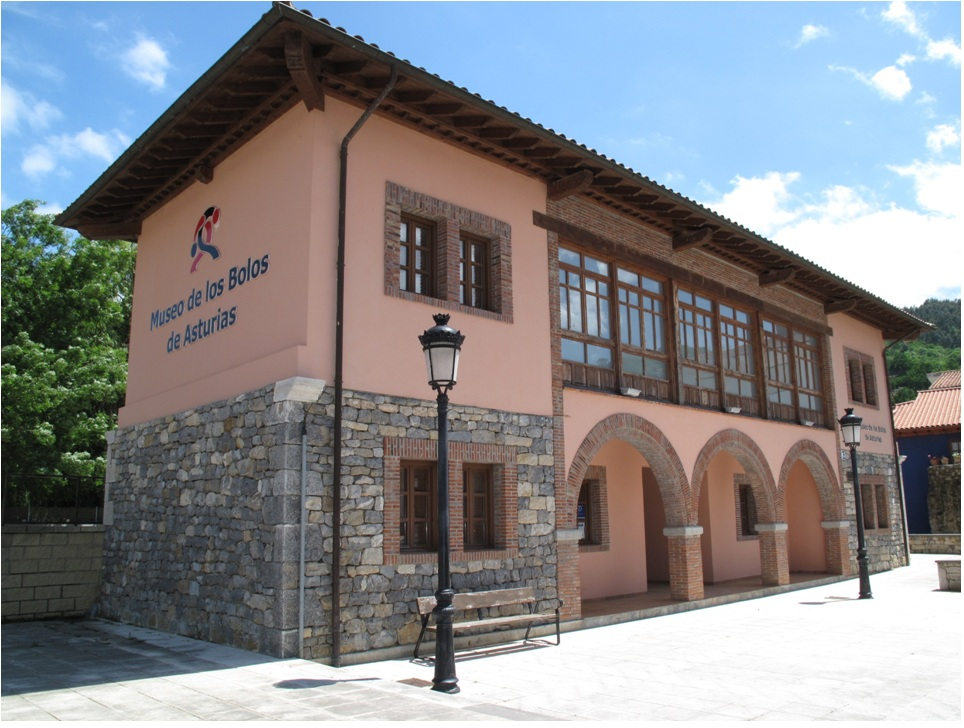
- Established: 2003
- Location: Plaza de Panes, Peñamellera Baja, Asturias, Spain
- Visitors: Over 2,000/year

The Bowling Museum of Asturias (Spanish: Museo de los Bolos de Asturias) is located in the Panes parish of Peñamellera Baja, Asturias, Spain. It is dedicated to the sport of bowling in its varied forms, mainly Asturian bowling. Opened 19 April 2003, the museum was pioneered by the municipality of Peñamellera Baja, the Principality of Asturias, and an eastern Asturian consortium.

== Collections ==
The interactive museum aims to provide information about the sport, its history, and its significance within the culture of Asturias. There are 1,000 pieces on exhibit displaying the fourteen existing forms of bowling which are played in the region. Exhibits include information on the manufacturing process of bowling balls and bowling pins, and documents about the game's history, the oldest of which, found at Simancas, dates to 1495.

Another part of the museum is a tribute to bowling players, featuring photographs of players and teams, trophies, posters, and badges. Texts written by Gaspar Melchor de Jovellanos, Armando Palacio Valdes, Camilo Jose Cela and Celso Amieva are also included.

The building that houses the museum was constructed especially for this purpose and is annexed to the Plaza's bowling alley, which dates from 1934.

== Bowling Types ==
The fourteen variations of bowling on display at the museum are split into two types, those which involve throwing the ball from a distance in the air towards the pins, and those which involve rolling it along the ground:

=== Throwing methods ===
- Cuatreada
- Bolos Roadaos
- Bolos de Luarca
- El Dexábolu
- Cuatrín de Agones
- Bolos de Salienca
- Cuarta de Degaña
- Birile o Bolo Palma

=== Rolling methods ===
- Batiente Rodao
- Batiente del Cabo Peñas
- Pasadiéz
- Bolos de C. de Narcea
- Bolos de Tineo
- Bolos del Navia
