= Merodio =

- Parish
- Location within Spain
- Coordinates: 43.316667°N 4.533333°W
- Country: Spain
- Autonomous community: Asturias
- Province: Asturias
- Municipality: Peñamellera Baja

Population
  - Total: 90

Merodio is one of eight parishes (administrative divisions) in Peñamellera Baja, a municipality within the province and autonomous community of Asturias, located in northern Spain.

The population was 90 in 2013.
