= Abándames =

- Parish
- Location within Spain
- Coordinates: 43.333333°N 4.6°W
- Country: Spain
- Autonomous community: Asturias
- Province: Asturias
- Municipality: Peñamellera Baja

Population
  - Total: 158

View of Abándames

Abándames is one of eight parishes (administrative divisions) in Peñamellera Baja, a municipality within the province and autonomous community of Asturias, in northern Spain.

The population is 158 (INE 2011).
