= Panes, Asturias =

Panes
- Parish
- Location within Asturias Location within Spain
- Coordinates: 43.333333°N 4.583333°W
- Country: Spain
- Autonomous community: Asturias
- Province: Asturias
- Municipality: Peñamellera Baja

Population (2024)
  - Total: 552

Panes is one of eight parishes in Peñamellera Baja, a municipality within the province and autonomous community of Asturias, in northern Spain.

The population of the parish in 2024 was 552, of which 259 (46.9%) were male and 293 (53.1%) were female.

The Bowling Museum of Asturias is located in the parish.
