= 2011 CERH Women's European Cup =

Tournament details
- Teams: 13 (from 5 associations)

Final positions
- Champions: (Spain) Voltregà (4th title)
- Runners-up: (Spain) Gijón

Tournament statistics
- Matches played: 19
- Goals scored: 160 (8.42 per match)

The 2011 CERH Women's European League was the 5th season of Europe's premier female club roller hockey competition organized by CERH.

Voltregà achieved its second title, finishing its second treble in the club's history.

== Results ==
The Final Four was played in Weil am Rhein, Germany

Preliminary round
(Germany) Diessbach	3	2	5
(Germany) Düsseldorf-Nord	2	6	8
(Spain) Voltregà	10	17	27
(Switzerland) Montreux	0	3	3
(Portugal) Marco	2	0	2
(Spain) Arenys de Munt	4	7	11
(France) Noisy le Grand	2	0	2
(Spain) Cerdanyola	5	10	15

Quarter-finals
(Germany) Düsseldorf-Nord	2	4	6
(Switzerland) Friedlingen	5	9	14
(France) Coutras	2	4	6
(Spain) Voltregà	4	10	14
(Germany) Cronenberg	0	2	2
(Spain) Arenys de Munt	5	9	14
(Spain) Cerdanyola	4	2	6
(Spain) Gijón	5	2	7

Semi-finals
4 May
(Switzerland) Friedlingen	2
(Spain) Voltregà	10
4 May
(Spain) Gijón	2
(Spain) Arenys de Munt	1

Final
5 May
(Spain) Voltregà	2
(Spain) Gijón	1

2011 CERH Women European League winners
(Spain)
Voltregà
Second title
