= 2018–19 OK Liga Femenina =

OK Liga Femenina
- Season: 2018–19
- Dates: 20 October 2018 – 25 May 2019
- Biggest home win: Manlleu 22–2 Cuencas Mineras (13 January 2019)
- Biggest away win: Liceo 2–16 Manlleu (20 October 2018)
- Highest scoring: Manlleu 22–2 Cuencas Mineras (13 January 2019)

The 2018–19 OK Liga Femenina is the 11th season of the top-tier league of women's rink hockey in Spain. It will start on 20 October 2018 and will end on 25 May 2019.

Hostelcur Gijón was the defending champion. Generali Palau de Plegamans achieved their second league title after beating 7–5 Manlleu in the last match of the season.

== Teams ==
OK Liga Femenina 2018–19 teams
OK Liga Femenina 2018–19 teams from Catalonia

Despite being relegated in the previous season, Liceo remained in the league as their reserve team won the promotion stage for teams from the northern Spain. The other place was for Cuencas Mineras, who will make their debut in the league.

Also Reus Deportiu remained in the top tier after the resign of Catalan teams to promote.

Team	Arena	City/Area
Alcorcón	Prado de Santo Domingo	Alcorcón
Bigues i Riells	Pavelló d'Esports	Bigues i Riells
Cerdanyola	Can Xarau	Cerdanyola del Vallès
Citylift Girona	Palau II	Girona
Cuencas Mineras	Colegio Sagrada Familia	Lena
Deportivo Liceo	Elviña	A Coruña
Generali Palau de Plegamans	Maria Víctor	Palau-solità i Plegamans
Las Rozas	Pabellón Municipal	Las Rozas
Manlleu	Pavelló d'Esports	Manlleu
Reus Deportiu	Pavelló del Reus Deportiu	Reus
Telecable Gijón	Mata-Jove	Gijón
Vila-sana	Pavelló d'Esports	Vila-sana
Vilanova	Pavelló d'Esports	Vilanova i la Geltrú
Voltregà Stern Motor	Victorià Oliveras de la Riva	Sant Hipòlit de Voltregà

== League table ==
Pos	Team	Pld	W	D	L	GF	GA	GD	Pts	Qualification or relegation
1	Generali Palau de Plegamans (C)	26	23	1	2	135	32	+103	70	Qualification to European League (Note: Voltregà Stern Motor qualified to the European League as title holders.)
2	Manlleu	26	22	1	3	178	42	+136	67	Qualification to European League
3	Telecable Gijón	26	19	3	4	139	56	+83	60	Qualification to European League
4	Las Rozas	26	15	3	8	81	53	+28	48	
5	Voltregà Stern Motor	26	14	5	7	99	60	+39	47 (Note: Voltregà Stern Motor is ahead of Vila-sana on head-to-head points: Voltregà Stern Motor–Vila-sana 3–0, Vila-sana–Voltregà Stern Motor 1–2)	Qualification to European League
6	Vila-sana	26	15	2	9	74	56	+18	47	
7	Cerdanyola	26	13	7	6	109	89	+20	46	
8	Bigues i Riells	26	10	3	13	100	89	+11	33 (Note: Bigues i Riells is ahead of Vilanova on head-to-head points: Vilanova–Bigues i Riells 2–5, Bigues i Riells–Vilanova 2–1)	
9	Vilanova	26	11	0	15	104	101	+3	33	
10	Citylift Girona	26	8	4	14	75	104	−29	28	
11	Alcorcón	26	7	2	17	61	104	−43	23	
12	Reus Deportiu (R)	26	6	2	18	60	106	−46	20	Relegation to lower divisions
13	Cuencas Mineras (R)	26	1	1	24	47	233	−186	4	Relegation to lower divisions
14	Deportivo Liceo (R)	26	0	2	24	27	164	−137	2	Relegation to lower divisions

Source: FEP.es
(C) Champions; (R) Relegated

== Results ==
Home \ Away	ALC	BIG	CER	CMI	LIC	PLE	GIR	ROZ	MAN	REU	GIJ	VSA	VNO	VOL
Alcorcón	—	6–4	3–6	9–2	2–0	1–7	3–1	2–4	1–5	4–3	2–3	2–4	1–3	3–5
Bigues i Riells	3–0	—	4–5	17–2	6–0	0–7	6–2	2–0	1–6	5–0	2–7	2–4	2–1	3–3
Cerdanyola	4–4	3–3	—	12–0	6–2	2–1	3–1	3–3	3–8	6–2	5–5	2–3	5–4	3–7
Cuencas Mineras	4–8	3–12	5–12	—	4–4	0–14	1–6	0–4	0–12	2–3	2–6	1–7	3–11	2–3
Deportivo Liceo	1–1	2–9	0–6	0–4	—	1–3	4–6	0–1	2–16	1–7	1–8	1–8	1–6	2–8
Generali Palau de Plegamans	7–0	3–2	4–0	10–1	6–0	—	9–2	4–0	7–5	6–1	4–1	8–1	3–2	6–0
Citylift Girona	2–1	6–2	2–2	7–3	9–3	3–7	—	1–5	1–7	2–2	2–11	2–5	5–1	0–2
Las Rozas	7–2	3–1	3–3	8–0	7–0	1–3	5–1	—	0–4	8–1	3–2	4–3	2–6	3–2
Manlleu	7–0	6–2	12–0	22–2	13–0	1–2	7–1	3–0	—	7–0	4–2	2–1	7–4	1–1
Reus Deportiu	1–3	7–1	1–5	6–1	3–0	2–2	0–4	1–2	2–10	—	2–4	1–4	10–5	1–6
Telecable Gijón	8–1	6–3	2–3	15–1	8–0	3–1	5–1	2–2	3–2	5–1	—	5–1	8–3	4–4
Vila-sana	3–0	3–1	3–3	4–0	3–0	1–2	2–2	2–1	2–4	3–0	2–6	—	3–2	1–2
Vilanova	7–1	2–5	3–6	12–3	6–2	1–6	5–3	4–1	3–4	5–2	2–4	0–1	—	4–3
Voltregà Stern Motor	3–1	2–2	4–1	9–1	8–0	1–3	3–3	1–4	2–3	5–1	2–6	3–0	10–2	—

Source: FEP.es
Legend: Blue = home team win; Yellow = draw; Red = away team win.

== Copa de la Reina ==
2019 Copa de la Reina
Tournament details
- Arena: Pavelló Olímpic, Reus
- Dates: 21–24 February 2019

Final positions
- Champions: Telecable Gijón (4th title)
- Runners-up: Cerdanyola

Awards and statistics
- MVP: (Spain) Marta Piquero

The 2019 Copa de la Reina was the 14th edition of the Spanish women's roller hockey cup.

Telecable Gijón won their fourth title ever, three years after their last win.

=== Draw ===
The draw was held at the Olympic Pavilion of Reus on 7 February 2019.

=== Bracket ===
Quarterfinals
21 February
Voltregà Stern Motor	3
Las Rozas	2
21 February
Manlleu	4
Cerdanyola	6
22 February
Generali Palau de Plegamans	1 (1)
Vila-sana	1 (2)
22 February
Telecable Gijón	5
Bigues i Riells	2

Semifinals
23 February
Voltregà Stern Motor	4 (0)
Cerdanyola	4 (2)
23 February
Vila-sana	0
Telecable Gijón	6

Final
24 February
Cerdanyola	3
Telecable Gijón	7

Source: FEP.es
