= Cuñaba =

- Parish
- Location within Spain
- Coordinates: 43.283333°N 4.633333°W
- Country: Spain
- Autonomous community: Asturias
- Province: Asturias
- Municipality: Peñamellera Baja

Population
  - Total: 47

Cuñaba is one of eight parishes (administrative divisions) in Peñamellera Baja, a municipality within the province and autonomous community of Asturias, in northern Spain. It is located in the Picos de Europa National Park.

The population is 47 (INE 2011).
