= Alevia, Asturias =

Alevia
- Parish
- Location within Spain
- Coordinates: 43.333333°N 4.6°W
- Country: Spain
- Autonomous community: Asturias
- Province: Asturias
- Municipality: Peñamellera Baja

Population
  - Total: 60 (2,011)

Alevia is one of eight parishes (administrative divisions) in Peñamellera Baja, a municipality within the province and autonomous community of Asturias, in northern Spain.

In 2011, the population of the parish was 60 people.
