= 2011–12 OK Liga Femenina =

Tournament details
- Dates: October 2011 – June 2012
- Teams: 14

Final positions
- Champions: Voltregà
- Runner-up: Girona
- Third Place: Igualada

Tournament summary
- Matches played: 182
- Goals scored: 961 (5.28 per match)
- Most goals: María Díez, Igualada, 42

The 2011–12 OK Liga Femenina was the fourth edition of Spain's premier women's rink hockey championship, running from 5 November 2011 to 2 June 2012. Defending champion CP Voltregà won its seventh title including the old Spanish Championship. Girona CH was the runner-up, and Igualada HC and Gijón HC also qualified for the 2013 European League. On the other hand, PHC Sant Cugat and previous season's runner-up CE Arenys de Munt were relegated. Despite losing all 26 games Vigo Stick Traviesas was again spared.

== Teams ==
OK Liga Femenina 2011–12 teams
Catalonia

Team	Arena	Established	City/Area
Alcorcón	Prado Santo Domingo	1980	Alcorcón
Biesca Gijón	Pabellón Mata-Jove	1995	Gijón
Bigues i Riells	Pavelló d'Esports	1991	Bigues i Riells
Sant Cugat	Pavelló Municipal	1967	Sant Cugat del Vallès
Fontanellas i Martí Igualada	Les Comes	1950	Igualada
Girona	Palau II	1940	Girona
Maheco Cerdanyola	Pavelló Can Xarau	1936	Cerdanyola del Vallès
Arenys de Munt	Pavelló Municipal	1959	Arenys de Munt
Palau de Plegamans	Maria Víctor	1975	Palau-solità i Plegamans
Reus Deportiu	Pavelló del Reus Deportiu	1909	Reus
SFERIC Terrassa	Pavelló SFERIC Terrassa	1950	Terrassa
Traviesas	Bouzas	1969	Vigo
Vilanova Salut Dental	Pavelló d'Esports	1951	Vilanova i la Geltrú
Voltregà	Victorià Oliveras de la Riva	1955	Sant Hipòlit de Voltregà

== Standings ==
	Team	P	W	D	L	GF	GA	GD	Pts
1	(Catalonia) Voltregà	26	19	4	3	97	38	59	61
2	(Catalonia) Girona	26	17	2	7	97	64	33	53
3	(Catalonia) Fontanellas y Martí	26	15	5	6	93	56	37	50
4	(Asturias) Biesca	26	15	5	6	71	39	32	50
5	(Community of Madrid) Cat's Best	26	14	5	7	78	49	29	47
6	(Catalonia) Reus	26	12	5	9	73	60	13	41
7	(Catalonia) Bigues i Riells	26	11	4	11	48	52	−4	37
8	(Catalonia) Vilanova	26	11	4	11	69	61	8	37
9	(Catalonia) SFERIC Terrassa	26	10	4	12	78	72	6	34
10	(Catalonia) Palau de Plegamans	26	10	4	12	68	68	0	34
11	(Catalonia) Maheco	26	9	5	12	70	73	−3	32
12	(Catalonia) Sant Cugat	26	7	1	18	51	84	−33	22
13	(Catalonia) Arenys de Munt	26	5	6	15	54	71	−17	21
14	(Galicia (Spain)) Traviesas	26	0	0	26	14	174	−160	0

source:Federación Española de Patinaje

European League
Relegated

2011–12 OK Liga Femenina winners
(Catalonia)
Voltregà
Second title

== Top scorers ==
Rank	Player	Team	Goals
1	(Spain) María Díez	Fontanellas y Martí	42
2	(Spain) Leticia Corrales	SFERIC Terrassa	38
3	(France) Vanessa Daribo	Girona	30
4	(Argentina) Luciana Agudo	Biesca	29
5	(Spain) Carla Giudici	Voltregà	29
6	(Spain) Berta Tarrida	Reus	26
7	(Spain) Berta Busquets	Palau i Plegamans	25
7	(Spain) Laia Castro	Girona	25
7	(Argentina) Daniela Guerrero	Maheco	25
7	(Spain) Natasha Lee	Voltregà	25

== Copa de la Reina ==
2012 Copa de la Reina
Tournament details
- Arena: Pavelló d'Esports, Reus
- Dates: 18–19 February 2012

Final positions
- Champions: Biesca Gijón (1st title)
- Runners-up: Voltregà

The 2012 Copa de la Reina was the 7th edition of the Spanish women's roller hockey cup. It was played at the Pavelló d'Esports de Reus, Reus, between the first three qualified teams after the first half of the season and Reus as host team.

Two golden goals allowed Biesca Gijón to win its first Cup.

Semifinals
18 February
Reus	2
Biesca Gijón (a.e.t.)	3
18 February
Voltregà	5
Girona	2

Final
18 February
Biesca Gijón (a.e.t.)	3
Voltregà	2
