= White Willow Grove =

White Willow Grove (or in Spanish Saucedas de Buelles) is a forest that runs along the banks of the Cares-Deva river between the towns of El Mazo, Narganes and Buelles in Asturias, Spain. It is a protected national monument. It consists of willows, mostly white (Salix alba), there are also some other shrub willows and alders along with oaks.
