= 2016–17 OK Liga Femenina =

OK Liga Femenina
- Champions: Hostelcur Gijón (2nd title)
- Relegated: Medicare System Mataró; Rivas Las Lagunas; Sant Cugat
- European Cup: Hostelcur Gijón; Voltregà; Generali Palau de Plegamans; Bigues i Riells
- Matches played: 182
- Goals scored: 802 (4.41 per match)
- Top goalscorer: María Díez (47 goals)
- Longest unbeaten run: 24 matches Hostelcur Gijón
- Longest winless run: 23 matches Sant Cugat

The 2016–17 OK Liga Femenina was the ninth edition of Spain's premier women's rink hockey championship. It started on 15 October 2016 and finished on 27 May 2017.

As in previous seasons, it is played by 14 teams in a round-robin format.

Hostelcur Gijón won its second title, eight years after its first one.

== Teams ==
OK Liga Femenina 2016–17 teams
OK Liga Femenina 2016–17 teams from Catalonia

Team	Arena	City/Area
Alcorcón	Prado de Santo Domingo	Alcorcón
Bigues i Riells	Pavelló d'Esports	Bigues i Riells
Cerdanyola	Can Xarau	Cerdanyola del Vallès
Covesa SFERIC Terrassa	La Maurina	Terrassa
Generali Palau de Plegamans	Maria Víctor	Palau-solità i Plegamans
Hostelcur Gijón	Mata-Jove	Gijón
Las Rozas	Pabellón Municipal	Las Rozas
Liceo	Elviña	A Coruña
Manlleu	Pavelló d'Esports	Manlleu
Medicare System Mataró	Jaume Parera	Mataró
Rivas Las Lagunas	Cerro del Telégrafo	Rivas-Vaciamadrid
Sant Cugat	Pavelló Municipal	Sant Cugat del Vallès
Vilanova	Pavelló d'Esports	Vilanova i la Geltrú
Voltregà	Victorià Oliveras de la Riva	Sant Hipòlit de Voltregà

== League table ==
Pos	Team	Pld	W	D	L	GF	GA	GD	Pts	Qualification or relegation
1	Hostelcur Gijón (C)	26	22	3	1	110	38	+72	69	Qualification to European Cup
2	Voltregà	26	18	4	4	86	37	+49	58	Qualification to European Cup
3	Generali Palau de Plegamans	26	16	4	6	80	40	+40	52	Qualification to European Cup
4	Bigues i Riells	26	13	4	9	53	53	0	43	Qualification to European Cup
5	Manlleu	26	12	6	8	60	54	+6	42	
6	Las Rozas	26	12	6	8	43	34	+9	42	
7	Vilanova	26	10	2	14	43	60	−17	32	
8	Covesa SFERIC Terrassa	26	9	4	13	55	73	−18	31	
9	Alcorcón	26	8	7	11	40	40	0	31	
10	Liceo	26	9	4	13	39	59	−20	31	
11	Cerdanyola	26	8	5	13	39	55	−16	29	
12	Medicare System Mataró (R)	26	8	3	15	62	68	−6	27	Relegation to Primera División
13	Rivas Las Lagunas (R)	26	6	5	15	67	82	−15	23	Relegation to Primera División
14	Sant Cugat (R)	26	2	1	23	25	109	−84	7	Relegation to Primera División

Source: FEP.es
(C) Champions; (R) Relegated

== Results ==
Home \ Away	ALC	BIG	CER	TER	PLE	GIJ	ROZ	LIC	MAN	MAT	RIV	SCU	VNO	VOL
Alcorcón	—	2–0	4–0	4–1	0–3	1–4	1–1	1–0	1–1	0–1	2–2	4–0	4–1	1–1
Bigues i Riells	2–1	—	3–1	3–0	0–1	2–3	2–1	3–2	3–3	2–0	3–3	3–0	0–0	0–5
Cerdanyola	3–0	1–1	—	1–2	0–4	1–6	2–1	2–0	2–2	0–4	5–1	3–2	3–0	3–3
Covesa SFERIC Terrassa	3–0	1–2	1–1	—	0–4	1–6	1–1	1–2	3–2	4–2	0–4	7–0	2–2	1–7
Generali Palau de Plegamans	0–0	4–3	3–1	4–5	—	1–1	3–0	1–2	3–0	5–2	4–2	8–0	4–1	3–7
Hostelcur Gijón	2–1	5–1	4–2	5–3	3–1	—	1–1	4–1	4–1	3–3	7–2	8–0	4–1	2–1
Las Rozas	1–1	0–2	4–0	2–1	1–0	5–2	—	2–1	2–1	2–1	2–0	1–1	1–2	0–0
Liceo	1–0	2–3	2–2	1–3	0–4	0–4	0–5	—	2–2	2–1	3–3	5–0	1–0	0–5
Manlleu	4–2	3–2	2–0	5–5	5–3	1–3	3–1	4–1	—	1–0	2–2	2–0	3–1	1–3
Medicare System Mataró	1–1	0–4	1–0	7–5	1–3	2–4	3–0	2–2	3–4	—	6–3	6–2	5–1	2–5
Rivas Las Lagunas	1–3	11–4	1–3	1–2	2–2	3–6	2–3	2–4	0–2	5–3	—	6–4	2–1	2–3
Sant Cugat	1–4	0–2	1–2	2–1	1–7	1–7	1–3	0–2	2–4	4–3	0–3	—	0–5	3–6
Vilanova	3–2	0–1	2–1	4–0	0–2	0–8	2–1	2–3	2–0	4–2	4–3	3–0	—	0–5
Voltregà	3–0	4–2	1–0	1–2	3–3	2–4	1–2	3–0	4–2	2–1	4–1	4–0	3–2	—

Source: FEP.es
Legend: Blue = home team win; Yellow = draw; Red = away team win.

== Top scorers ==
Rank	Player	Club	Goals
1	María Díez	Hostelcur Gijón	47
2	Natasha Lee	Voltregà	35
3	Berta Busquets	Generali Palau de Plegamans	27
4	Marina Monge	Rivas Las Lagunas	23
5	Carla Fontdegloria	Medicare System Mataró	22
5	Marta Piquero	Hostelcur Gijón	22
5	Marta Borrás	Bigues i Riells	22

== Copa de la Reina ==
2017 Copa de la Reina
Tournament details
- Dates: 10–12 April 2017

Final positions
- Champions: Voltregà (6th title)
- Runners-up: Hostelcur Gijón

Awards and statistics
- MVP: (Spain) Adriana Gutiérrez

The 2017 Copa de la Reina was the 12th edition of the Spanish women's roller hockey cup. As in the previous three years, it was played in Lloret de Mar between the eight first qualified teams after the first half of the season.

Voltregà achieved its sixth trophy by defeating Hostelcur Gijón 3–2 in the overtime with a golden goal.

Quarterfinals
10 March
Voltregà	7
Bigues i Riells	4
10 March
Generali Palau de Plegamans	2
Liceo	0
10 March
Hostelcur Gijón	3
Las Rozas	0
10 March
Manlleu	4
Covesa SFERIC Terrassa	3

Semifinals
11 March
Voltregà	3
Generali Palau de Plegamans	2
11 March
Hostelcur Gijón	3
Manlleu	0

Final
12 March
Voltregà (a.e.t)	3
Hostelcur Gijón	2
