= Buelles =

- Parish
- Location within Spain
- Coordinates: 43.333333°N 4.533333°W
- Country: Spain
- Autonomous community: Asturias
- Province: Asturias
- Municipality: Peñamellera Baja

Population
  - Total: 110

Buelles is one of eight parishes (administrative divisiohttps://www.tageo.com/index-e-sp-v-34-d-m557054.htmns) in Peñamellera Baja, a municipality within the province and autonomous community of Asturias, in northern Spain.

The population is 110 (INE 2011).
