= Copa de la Reina de Hockey Patines =

Spanish roller hockey tournament

Copa de la Reina
- Sport: Roller hockey
- Founded: 2008
- No. of teams: 8
- Country: Spain
- Most recent champions: CP Vila-sana (1st title)
- Most titles: Voltregà (6 titles)
- Broadcasters: Teledeporte, Esport3, RFEP TV
- Related competitions: OK Liga Femenina
- Website: www.fep.es

The Copa de S.M. la Reina de Hockey Patines is an annual cup competition for Spanish women's rink hockey teams organized by the Spanish Skating Federation. First held in 2006, it is currently contested in spring by the top four team's in the OK Liga's table. CP Voltregà is the cup's most successful club with 6 titles, Biesca Gijón have 3 titles, while CP Vilanova and Cerdanyola CH have won one title each.

== List of finals ==
Year	Host city	Champions	Result	Runner-up
2006	Burgos	Voltregà	4–1	Arenys de Munt
2007	Pamplona	Calzedonia Voltregà	6–1	Biesca Gijón
2008	Sant Sadurní d'Anoia	Calzedonia Voltregà	2–0	Biesca Gijón
2009	Mieres	Vilanova L'Ull Blau	10–1	Alcorcón Cat's Best
2010	Vilanova i la Geltrú	Cerdanyola	5–4	Voltregà
2011	Gijón	Voltregà	4–3^{(a.e.t.)}	Arenys de Munt
2012	Reus	Biesca Gijón	3–2^{(a.e.t.)}	Voltregà
2013	Sant Hipòlit de Voltregà	Biesca Gijón	3–2^{(a.e.t.)}	Alcorcón
2014	Lloret de Mar	Voltregà	3–1	Manlleu
2015	Lloret de Mar	Manlleu	3–2	Voltregà
2016	Lloret de Mar	Hostelcur Gijón	2–2^{(5–4p)}	Generali Palau de Plegamans
2017	Lloret de Mar	Voltregà	3–2^{(a.e.t.)}	Hostelcur Gijón
2018	Vilanova i la Geltrú	Calmar Vilanova	2–1	Hostelcur Gijón
2019	Reus	Telecable Gijón	7–3	Cerdanyola
2021	A Coruña	Manlleu	5–2	Generali Palau de Plegamans
2022	Lleida	Manlleu	3–3^{(3–1p)}	Generali Palau de Plegamans
2023	Calafell	Telecable HC	3–1	Generali Palau de Plegamans
2024	Vilafranca del Penedès	Generali Palau de Plegamans	1–1^{(3–2p)}	Telecable HC
2025	Cerdanyola del Vallès	CP Vila-sana	5–0	Cerdanyola

== Titles by team ==
Team	Winners	Runners-up	Years winners
Voltregà	6	3	2006, 2007, 2008, 2011, 2014, 2017
Telecable Gijón	5	5	2012, 2013, 2016, 2019, 2023
Manlleu	3	1	2015, 2021, 2022
Vilanova	2	0	2009, 2018
Palau de Plegamans	1	3	2024
Cerdanyola	1	2	2010
CP Vila-sana	1	0	2025
Arenys de Munt	0	2	
Alcorcón	0	2	

== See also ==
- OK Liga Femenina
