= Cerdanyola CH =

Catalan rink hockey club based in Cerdanyola

Cerdanyola
- Full name: Cerdanyola Club d'Hoquei
- League: OK Liga
- Founded: 1936
- Home ground: Pavelló Municipal Can Xarau, Cerdanyola del Vallès, Catalonia (Capacity 952)

Personnel
- Chairman: Agustí Birbe
- Manager: Juanjo Ferrer
- Website: Official website
Home

Cerdanyola Club d'Hoquei, also known as Maheco Cerdanyola for sponsorship reasons, is a Catalan rink hockey club from Cerdanyola del Vallès (Vallès Occidental).

== History ==
Established in 1936, it makes Cerdanyola the oldest rink hockey club in Spain. The men's team, which nowadays plays in the second tier, major successes were reaching the finals of the 1973 Copa del Rey and the 1985 CERS Cup, lost to Reus Deportiu and Hockey Novara respectively. The women's team won both the OK Liga and the Copa de la Reina in 2010.

== Titles ==
- Women:
  - Spanish League (1)
    - 2010
  - Spanish Cup (1)
    - 2010

== Season to season ==
=== Men's team ===
Season	Tier	Division	Pos.
2007–08	1	OK Liga	14th
2008–09	2	1ª División	6th
2009–10	2	1ª División	8th (Note: Resigned to play in Primera División due to financial problems.)
2010–11	3	Nacional	13th
2011–12	3	Nacional	14th
2012–13	4	1ª Catalana	1st
2013–14	3	Nacional	3rd
2014–15	3	Nacional	14th
2015–16	4	1ª Catalana	4th
2016–17	3	Nacional	14th
2017–18	4	1ª Catalana	6th (Note: Achieved a vacant place in the third tier.)
2018–19	3	Nacional	9th

=== Women's team ===
Season	Tier	Division	Pos.	Copa de la Reina	European Cup
2008–09	(Note: Catalan teams refused to participate in the new OK Liga.)	Catalan league	3rd		
2009–10	1	OK Liga	1st	Champion	
2010–11	1	OK Liga	8th		Quarterfinalist
2011–12	1	OK Liga	11th		
2012–13	1	OK Liga	12th (Note: Resigned to play in Primera División due to financial problems.)		
2013–14	2	Nacional	4th		
2014–15	2	Nacional	1st		
2015–16	1	OK Liga	10th		
2016–17	1	OK Liga	11th		
2017–18	1	OK Liga	6th	Quarterfinalist	
2018–19	1	OK Liga	7th	Runner-up	
