= Asturian bowling =

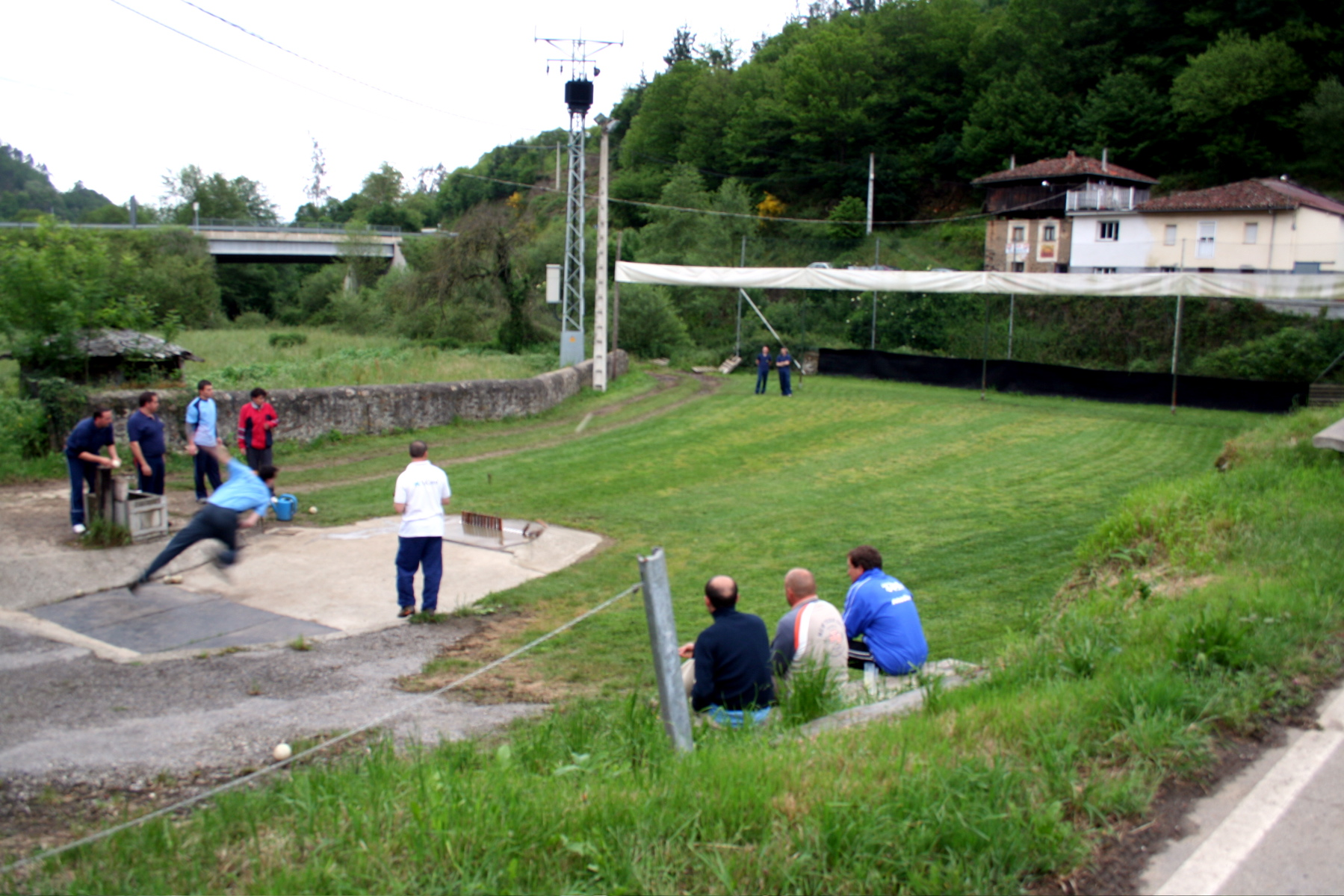
Bolo de Tineo game

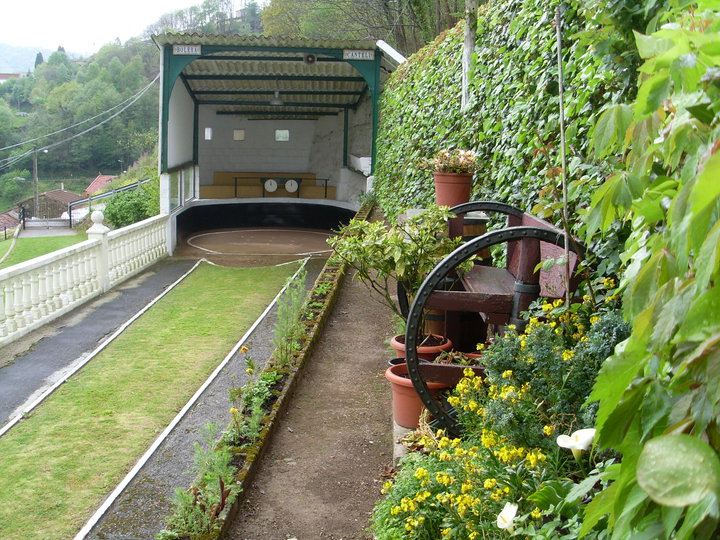
Cuatreada Alley at El Polledo, SMRA

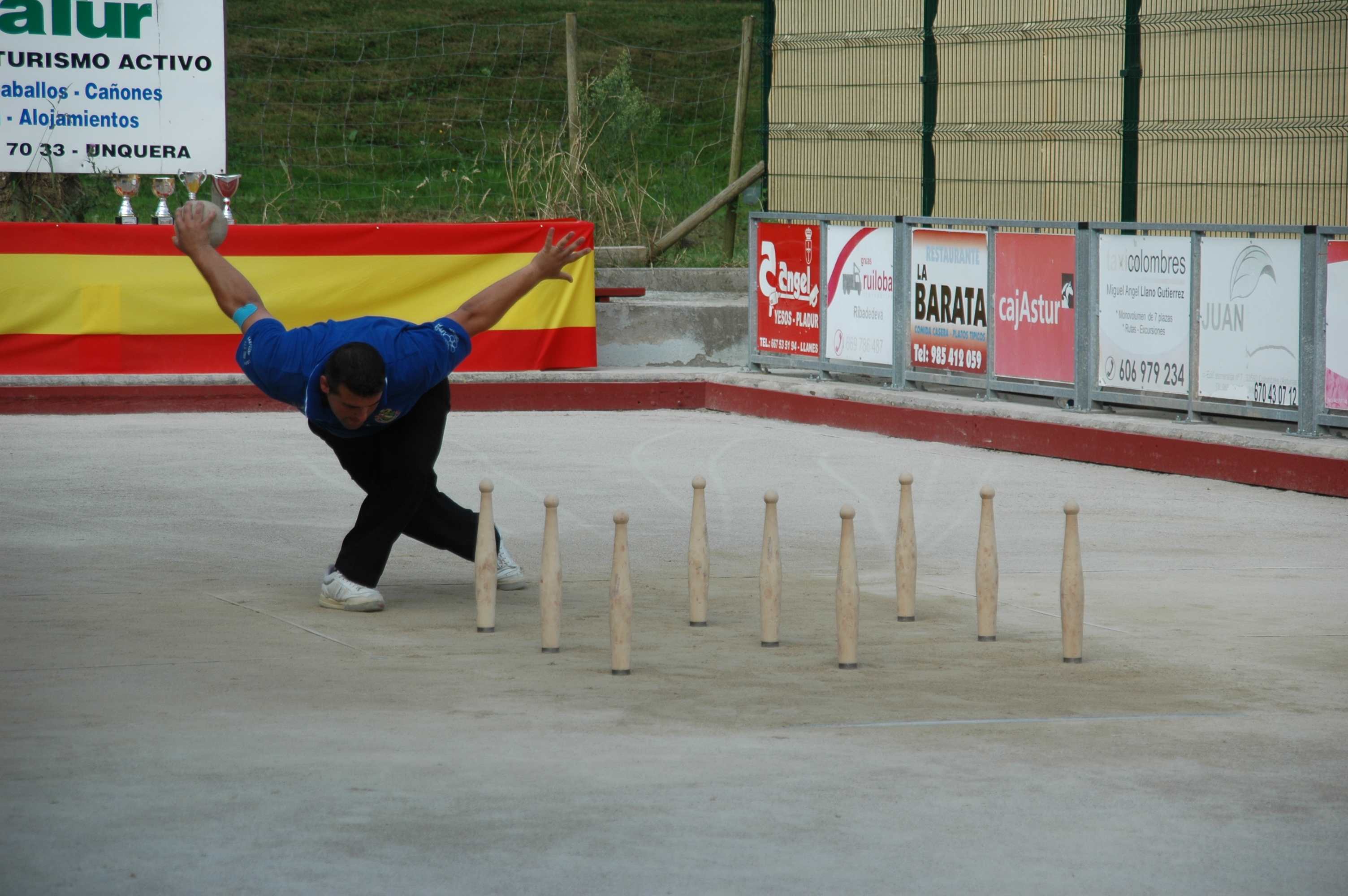
Bolo palma

Asturian bowling is the variation of bowling mainly played in the Asturias, and is the most important traditional sport in this Spanish Autonomous Community.

== History ==
There are controversies about its origins. The most credible hypothesis is that the game was brought to the area by pilgrims travelling the Camino de Santiago.

Bowling is important in Asturian culture as it is mentioned in the regional mythology, for example with the golden bowls of the xanes.

The first reference to Asturian bowling, one of the oldest in Spain, dates back to 1495. Alonso de Quintanilla, major book-keeper of the Catholic Monarchs, complained that Nuno Bernaldo de Quirós had damaged his coat of arms during a bowling game at Campo de San Francisco in Oviedo. Thanks to this document, it is known that the pins were called byrlos and that betting was usual during the games.

In the 18th century, according to Gaspar Melchor de Jovellanos, most places in Asturias had a bowling alley. During the 19th century and the early 20th, Asturian bowling became the most widespread activity in the rural zones of the region.

The popularity of the sport grew during the 20th century with the creation of a Federation, which was then dissolved during the Spanish Civil War. After the end of the war, competitions were again organised, and the Asturian Federation of Bowling was reestablished in 1962.

Nowadays, due to the rural emigration, some bowling variations have fallen into disuse. Despite the emigration, the rise of interest in traditional culture is helping to keep the game alive, especially in the most played variations such as cuatreada, birle or bolo celta.

== Variations ==
- Cuatreada: the most popular variation, mainly played in the center and the East of Asturias.
- Birle or bolo palma: played in the Eastern Asturias and Cantabria.
- Bolo batiente or batiente rodáu: played in the Western coast of Asturias.
- Bolo of Tineo or bolo celta.
- Bolo vaqueiro

== See also ==
- Bowling Museum of Asturias
