= CP Areces =

Spanish roller hockey team

Areces
- Full name: Club Patín Areces
- League: Autonómica
- Founded: 1965
- Home ground: Polideportivo Municipal; Grado, Asturias (Capacity 1,000)
Home	Away

Club Patín Areces is a Spanish roller hockey team based in Grado, Asturias.

== History ==
Founded in 1965 with the name of their main sponsor, Cafés Areces, the team promoted for the first time to the top tier in 1994, remaining only two seasons before its relegation. It became a yo-yo club between the first and second division, until 2001, when it relegates to the second division, remaining there until 2015. In that season, the club was newly relegated to the third division after an outrageous season.

== Season to season ==
Season	Tier	Division	Pos.
1996–97	2	1ª División	2nd
1997–98	1	Div. Honor	13th
1998–99	1	Div. Honor	16th
1999–00	2	1ª División	5th
2000–01	2	1ª División	2nd
2001–02	1	Div. Honor	16th
2002–03	2	1ª División	10th
2003–04	2	1ª División	10th
2004–05	2	1ª División	9th
2005–06	2	1ª División	8th
2006–07	2	1ª División	5th
2007–08	2	1ª División	5th
2008–09	2	1ª División	11th
2009–10	2	1ª División	12th
2010–11	2	1ª División	11th
2011–12	2	1ª División	11th
2012–13	2	1ª División	9th
2013–14	2	1ª División	10th
2014–15	2	1ª División	14th
2015–16	3	Autonómica	2nd
2016–17	3	Autonómica	4th
2017–18	3	Autonómica	1st
2018–19	3	Autonómica	2nd
2018–19	3	OK Bronce	6th

== Trophies ==
- Second division: (2)
  - 1993–94, 2000–01
- Copa Príncipe de Asturias: (1)
  - 2007
