= CP Cuencas Mineras =

Spanish roller hockey club

Cuencas Mineras
- Full name: Club Patín Cuencas Mineras
- League: OK Liga
- Founded: 2014
- Home ground: Colegio Sagrada Familia, Lena, Asturias (Capacity 500)
Home

Club Patín Cuencas Mineras is a Spanish roller hockey club based in Lena, in the autonomous community of Asturias.

== History ==
CP Cuencas Mineras was established in 2014 as a result of the merge of three teams: CP El Pilar, CP Mieres and CD Patinalón.

On 3 June 2018, the club promoted for the first time ever to the OK Liga Femenina.

== Season to season ==
Season	Tier	Division	Pos.
2015–16	2	Autonómica	3rd
2016–17	2	Autonómica	1st
2017–18	2	Autonómica	1st
2018–19	1	OK Liga	13th (Note: Remained in the league as their reserve team won the promotion stage.)
